= Who Owns My Heart =

2010 single by Miley Cyrus

Single by Miley Cyrus

from the album Can't Be Tamed
- B-side: "Forgiveness and Love"
- Released: October 22, 2010
- Recorded: 2010
- Studio: Henson Recording Studios (Los Angeles, CA)
- Genre: Electropop; hi-NRG
- Length: 3:34
- Label: Hollywood
- Songwriters: Miley Cyrus; Antonina Armato; Tim James; Devrim Karaoglu
- Producers: Antonina Armato; Tim James

Miley Cyrus singles chronology
"Ordinary Girl" (2010)	"Who Owns My Heart" (2010)	"Gonna Get This" (2010)

Music video
- "Who Owns My Heart" on YouTube

"Who Owns My Heart" is a song by American singer Miley Cyrus, from her third studio album Can't Be Tamed (2010). The song was written by Cyrus, Antonina Armato, Tim James and Devrim Karaoglu, and produced by Armato and James. It was released on October 22, 2010 in Germany by Hollywood Records as the second and final single from the album. It would become her final overall release with Hollywood Records after signing with RCA Records in 2013. The song was written about the feelings a club's environment can lead someone to believe. "Who Owns My Heart" is musically club-oriented and driven by synths. Lyrically, the song speaks of meeting a potential love interest at a nightclub.

The song garnered mixed reception from music critics; some argued it was dull and faceless, while others deemed it one of the best tracks on Can't Be Tamed. It reached the top 40 in Austria, Germany, Romania, and the Commonwealth of Independent States. A corresponding music video for "Who Owns My Heart" was directed by Robert Hales. It follows Cyrus throughout preparing herself for, arriving and dancing at a mansion party. The video was criticized by the Parents Television Council for its sexual elements.

== Background ==
The song was written by Cyrus in collaboration with Antonina Armato, Tim James, and Devrim Karaoglu. Cyrus described it as a "total dance track" with a cool concept. "Who Owns My Heart" was written about the feelings a club's environment can lead one to believe. Cyrus depicted the club scene to be very sexy, which she thought was primarily composed by the music playing and intense lighting, and thought that it might trigger fake emotions with the person one is dancing with. She stated, "If you're out, dancing at a club, the way the whole vibe is [...] Do you actually like the person you're dancing with or is just the whole ambiance of what's going on?"

== Composition ==
"Who Owns My Heart" (2010)
Cyrus' "Who Owns My Heart" is a club-oriented song that speaks of meeting a potential love on the dance floor.

"Who Owns My Heart" is an electropop song with a length of three minutes and 35 seconds. It is an uptempo and predominantly club-oriented number that is inspired by 1980s music. The song is set in common time and has a driving dance tempo of 136 beats per minute. It is written in the key of A minor and Cyrus' vocals span two octaves, from G_{3} to C_{5}. It follows the chord progression Am–F–Dm–E. "Who Owns My Heart" is heavy in rubbery and bubbling disco synths. Keyboard riffs also drive the song's instrumentation. Lyrically, "Who Owns My Heart" speaks of the thrill of meeting a potential love interest on the dance floor. Verses and the bridge describe the setting using comparisons to numerous things, including tsunamis and rodeos. The song's refrains proceed to question, "Who owns my heart? Is it love or is it art?"

== Critical reception ==
Tanner Stransky of Entertainment Weekly stated, "This song is a pulsy, possibly club-ready jam that deserves single status." Heather Phares of AllMusic used "Who Owns My Heart" as an example of, according to her, a recurring problem on Can't Be Tamed: "too often, Cyrus equates grown-up with joyless". Alexis Petridis of the United Kingdom magazine The Guardian felt the song was a gamely attempt at Lady Gaga. He said the chorus invites the answer: "probably that creepy bloke from the Disney Channel who went on about violating your godliness." Evan Sawdey of PopMatters also found an alternate answer to the song's chorus. "It’s commerce that owns your heart, Miley, and it always has been", he wrote. Mikael Wood of Billboard compared "Who Owns My Heart" to 2010 singles released by The Black Eyed Peas. Nick Levine of Digital Spy said it was a post-GaGa Hi-NRG track inclined to the generic. However, he said lyrical references were a large reminder Cyrus sung the track. Ed Masley of The Arizona Republic deemed "Who Owns My Heart" to be one of the best tracks from Can't Be Tamed, despite containing a "cheesy ABBA-worthy chorus". Jon Caramanica of The New York Times also perceived the song to be "in the vein of Cascada" and one of the most "exciting" on Can't Be Tamed. He said it was a sound "Ms. Cyrus hasn’t previously shown any affinity for and may never again. Still, it’s a timely and sharp sound."

== Commercial performance ==
The song debuted at number 35 on the Austrian Singles Chart, on the week ending November 19, 2010. The following week, "Who Owns My Heart" descended to number 50 and, later, number 54 before completely falling from the chart. On the week ending November 22, 2010, "Who Owns My Heart" debuted and peaked at number 24 on the German Singles Chart. In the succeeding week, the song dropped to number 39. The track continued to descend in positions until spending its last week on the German Singles Chart on the week ending January 10, 2011. The song spent a total of seven weeks on the chart.

== Music video ==
The music video for "Who Owns My Heart" was directed by Robert Hales, who previously directed the video for "Can't Be Tamed", and filmed on August 6–7, 2010 at the Meadow Brook Hall in Rochester Hills, Michigan. The video commences with Cyrus asleep, blindfolded on a mattress in a bedroom. She awakens and writhes on the mattress. Following, Cyrus proceeds to a bathroom, her attire is composed of a white tank top, white boy shorts, a fishnet hair wrap, rollers, and heavy metal jewelry. While in the bathroom scenes, Cyrus sings as she sits on the edge of a bathtub and prepares herself for an upcoming party. With the arrival of the song's refrains, Cyrus appears writhing in the backseat of a limousine, costumed in a low-cut gold halter top, black hot pants, a black jacket with shoulder pads, and big hair. Once arrived at the mansion party, she is first seen dancing atop a big, wooden table. In the continuation of the video, Cyrus dances with multiple people on the dance floor. Cut-scenes feature Cyrus in all prior scenes or dancing with others in the mansion's study. The video concludes with Cyrus back in her bedroom, once again waking up.

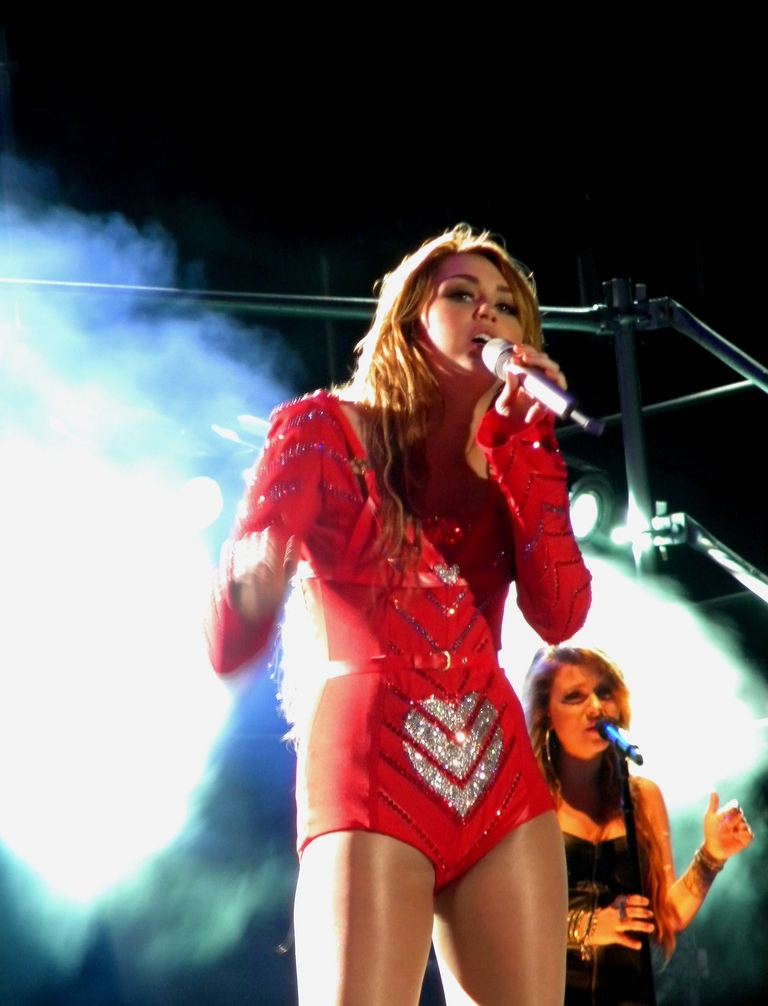
Cyrus performing "Who Owns My Heart" on her Gypsy Heart Tour

The video for "Who Owns My Heart" was premiered in MSN Spain on October 8, 2010. Jocelyn Vena of MTV News wrote, "There comes a time in every pop princess' career when she must throw a sexy dance party and proclaim her womanhood. Back in 2001 Britney Spears did as much in 'I'm a Slave 4 U,' and this week, Miley Cyrus is doing the same in the video for her club-ready track 'Who Owns My Heart.'" Tanner Stransky of Entertainment Weekly assumed the theme of the video were the divergent hairstyles, but acclaimed the video for its fun. Stransky further wrote that the sultry aspect of the video added to its frothy, "thumpa-thumpa deliciousness". Edith Zimmerman of New York magazine viewed it as "awkward". Megan Vick of Billboard thought the video followed the same steps as the video for "Can't Be Tamed" — dark lighting, many bare Cyrus parts and writhing around on flat surfaces. Vick recalled Amy Winehouse's "Rehab" video when seeing the bathroom scene and viewed the ending as a relief. Tim Winter, president of the Parents Television Council, criticized the video for its suggestiveness and sexual elements. Winter continued, "It is unfortunate that she would participate in such a sexualized video like this one. It sends messages to her fanbase that are diametrically opposed to everything she has done up to this point. Miley built her fame and fortune entirely on the backs of young girls, and it saddens us that she seems so eager to distance herself from that fanbase so rapidly."

Cyrus performed "Who Owns My Hearts" for the iHeartRadio Music Festival 2020. She created visual content for the 2020 "iHeartRadio Music Festival". The backdrop music video was released on Cyrus's YouTube account due to high demand by fans.

== Live performances ==
Miley Cyrus first performed "Who Owns My Heart" at a concert at the House of Blues in Los Angeles, California, which was streamed across over thirty websites owned by MTV Networks. Dressed in a cut-out leotard that and black, leather pants, she single-handedly roamed throughout the stage to perform the song. Cyrus embarked on a European promotional tour for the single in October 2010. On November 6, 2010, Cyrus performed the track on the German television program Wetten, dass..?. On November 7, 2010, Cyrus performed "Who Owns My Heart" at the 2010 MTV Europe Music Awards at the Caja Mágica in Madrid, Spain. The performance featured elaborate costuming that had Cyrus bearing white bodysuit with a turtle neck while female dancers in lingerie and male dancers in suits, challenging dance routines, and symbolism. Cyrus explained,

"We actually came up with this concept because I wanted it to kinda be Angels & Demons (2000), but it's not a Tom Hanks reference. It's [about the idea] that during this world, you're always going to have temptation; basically that's kind of the whole vibe. It's a little more Victorian. There's a lot of lace. The girls are dressed all in white, and the guys are in black... The girls will know what I'm talking about."

The song was the closing number of Cyrus' Gypsy Heart Tour. Cyrus performed "Who Owns My Heart" for the iHeartRadio Music Festival 2020.

== Charts ==
=== Weekly charts ===
2010 chart performance for "Who Owns My Heart"
Chart (2010)	Peak position
Austria (Ö3 Austria Top 40)	35
Belgium (Ultratip Bubbling Under Flanders)	2
CIS Airplay (TopHit)	17
Germany (GfK)	24
Hungary (Rádiós Top 40)	20
Romania (Romanian Top 100)	36
Russia Airplay (TopHit)	15
Ukraine Airplay (TopHit)	42

2013 chart performance for "Who Owns My Heart"
Chart (2013)	Peak position
US Billboard Streaming Songs	47

=== Year-end charts ===
Year-end chart performance for "Who Owns My Heart"
Chart (2011)	Position
CIS (TopHit)	64
Russia Airplay (TopHit)	52

== Certifications ==
Certifications and sales for "Who Owns My Heart"
Region	Certification	Certified units/sales
Australia (ARIA)	Gold	35,000^{‡}
United States (RIAA)	Gold	500,000^{‡}
^{‡} Sales+streaming figures based on certification alone.

== Release history ==
"Who Owns My Heart" release history
Region	Date	Format	Label	Ref.
Germany	October 22, 2010	Digital download	Hollywood	
Germany	November 5, 2010	CD	Hollywood	
