= Gonna Get This =

2010 single by Miley Cyrus and Iyaz

Single by Hannah Montana and Iyaz

from the album Hannah Montana Forever
- Released: October 5, 2010
- Recorded: 2010
- Length: 3:18
- Label: Walt Disney
- Songwriters: Niclas Molinder; Joacim Persson; Johan Alkenäs; Drew Ryan Scott
- Producers: Twin; Alke

Miley Cyrus singles chronology
"Who Owns My Heart" (2010)	"Gonna Get This" (2010)	"I'm Still Good" (2010)

Iyaz singles chronology
"Break My Bank" (2010)	"Gonna Get This" (2010)	"The Mack" (2011)

"Gonna Get This" is a song by fictional character Hannah Montana, recorded by American singer and actress Miley Cyrus with British singer Iyaz for the soundtrack album Hannah Montana Forever (2010), which accompanied the fourth and final season of the Disney Channel series Hannah Montana. The song was released by Walt Disney Records on October 5, 2010 as the third single from the soundtrack album.

== Background and composition ==
"Gonna Get This" (2010)
An audio sample of Hannah Montana's "Gonna Get This" featuring the first chorus of the song

"Gonna Get This" was written by Niclas Molinder, Joacim Persson, Johan Alkenas, and Drew Ryan Scott. Released on October 5, 2010 as the third single from the album. It is featured in the eighth episode of Hannah Montana Forever, titled "Hannah's Gonna Get This"; Iyaz guest stars in the episode, where he and Hannah are shown recording the song in a studio.

== Reception ==
Although the song has not been commented on in any official reviews, the song was chosen as one of the top tracks according to the Allmusic Guide.

The song debuted at thirty-six on the US Hot Digital Songs chart for the week ending November 6, 2010, which led to a debut at no. 66 on Billboard's US Hot 100.

== Music video ==
Cyrus as Montana and Iyaz singing in a recording studio

Unlike other Hannah Montana music videos, "Gonna Get This" is not a concert taping performance. It features Cyrus dressed as Hannah Montana and Iyaz singing in a recording studio. All of the footage from the song are taken from the Hannah Montana Forever episode "Hannah's Gonna Get This". There are also special effects of Rico dancing and some of the lyrics flashing across the screen.

== Charts ==
Chart performance for "Gonna Get This"
Chart (2010)	Peak position
Australia (ARIA)	75
US Billboard Hot 100	66

== Certifications ==
Certifications for "Gonna Get This"
Region	Certification	Certified units/sales
United States (RIAA)	Gold	500,000^{‡}
^{‡} Sales+streaming figures based on certification alone.
