= Can't Be Tamed (song) =

2010 single by Miley Cyrus

Single by Miley Cyrus

from the album Can't Be Tamed
- Released: May 3, 2010
- Genre: Synth-pop; dance-pop
- Length: 2:48
- Label: Hollywood
- Songwriters: Miley Cyrus; Antonina Armato; Tim James; Marek Pompetzki; Paul NZA
- Producer: Rock Mafia

Miley Cyrus singles chronology
"Nothing to Lose" (2010)	"Can't Be Tamed" (2010)	"Ordinary Girl" (2010)

Music video
- "Can't Be Tamed" on YouTube

"Can't Be Tamed" is a song by American singer Miley Cyrus for her third studio album of the same name (2010). It was released on May 3, 2010, by Hollywood Records as the lead single from the record. The song was written by Cyrus, Antonina Armato, and Tim James. A Rockangeles remix version featuring rapper Lil Jon was included as a bonus track on the iTunes Store edition of the album. According to Cyrus, "Can't Be Tamed" describes a desire to break out and experience freedom. The song's lyrics deal with the themes of freedom and self-expression.

"Can't Be Tamed" received favorable reviews from music critics. It also attained commercial success, peaking within the top ten in the US, Canada, New Zealand and Ireland. The song's accompanying music video was directed by Robert Hales and follows Cyrus performing with backup dancers throughout a museum. The singer is first trapped in a giant cage, being observed by spectators; she then escapes and trashes the museum. Cyrus promoted "Can't Be Tamed" by performing the song at several venues, including a performance on Britain's Got Talent that resulted in negative reactions from the media. The song was also included in the setlist of Cyrus' third and fourth world tours, the Gypsy Heart Tour and the Bangerz Tour. "Can't Be Tamed" premiered before its official release on April 30, 2010, on Cyrus' official MySpace.

== Background ==
"Can't Be Tamed" was co-written by Cyrus, Antonina Armato and Tim James, who also produced the track. According to Cyrus, the track's moral is to free yourself from any biding or hindrance, in particular application to women. Cyrus said the song's message applies to different situations. Personally to her, "it is about being a cage and people looking at you." As for others, she believed it could describe high school, in a situation where "someone feeling they have to be one way to be with a clique and they want to be who they are. A relationship, or whatever, it is just breaking out and feeling free." Hollywood Records described "Can't Be Tamed" as "a self-empowering song in which Miley asserts that she has to stay true to herself in relationships".

At four meetings throughout Europe, Cyrus' manager, Jason Morey, presented the album Can't Be Tamed to representatives from Universal Music Group; the representatives confirmed what Hollywood Records in the United States had already decided, that the track would be released as the lead single. "Can't Be Tamed" premiered on April 30, 2010, on Cyrus' official MySpace page; it was officially released for airplay on May 3, 2010, and released as a digital download on May 18, 2010. In May 2010, Cyrus recorded the Rockangeles remix of "Can't Be Tamed" with rapper Lil Jon at Rock Mafia Studios in Santa Monica, California. Lil Jon said the collaboration was "crazy" and thought audiences would enjoy the remix. Cyrus added, "He just came in and let it out. It's pretty rockin." They believed Lil Jon gave the remix more energy than the original version had.

== Composition ==
"Can't Be Tamed" (2010)
Cyrus' "Can't Be Tamed" is heavily based on synths and explores through club music.

"Can't Be Tamed" is a synth-pop and dance-pop song two minutes and 48 seconds long. The song has been described as "grown-up club sound". The song is set in compound time of 12/8 and has a fast tempo of 118 beats per minute. It is written in the key of B minor and Cyrus' vocals span two octaves, from A_{3} to D_{5}. Cyrus belts her way through the choruses, while some lines in the verses feature processed vocals with the use of auto-tune. It follows the chord progression B_{5}–D–A. Driven by a dark, pounding beat and the heavy use of synths, "Can't Be Tamed"'s instrumentation relies on drum machine.

Written solely in first person, "Can't Be Tamed" explores the themes of freedom and self-expression, approached by sultry lyrics. It puts emphasis to how she cannot be changed or molded into being something she is not. In the verses, Cyrus addresses confidence and the attempt to discover for what she is yearning for, respectively. Choruses have Cyrus shouting the title and variations of it in a repetitive manner, against the beat of the song. Monica Herrera of Billboard interpreted the lyrics "If there was a question about my intentions, I'll tell ya / I'm not here to sell ya" to be an official declaration of rebellion in order to dispose herself of tween role-model responsibilities. Likewise, various other critics believed "Can't Be Tamed" spoke of her completely drawing away from the image she had developed through Hannah Montana, which first aired in March 2006.

== Critical reception ==
Professional ratings
Review scores
Source	Rating
About.com	2.5/5 stars
Rolling Stone	3/5 stars

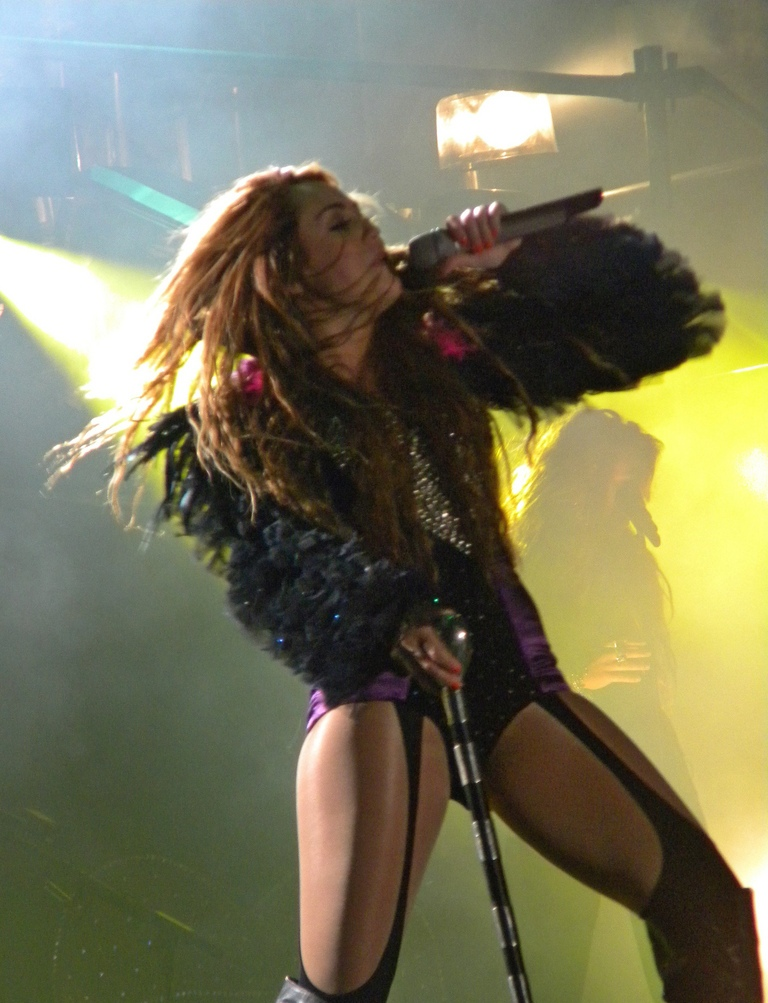
Cyrus performing "Can't Be Tamed" during the Gypsy Heart Tour

Critics typically reviewed "Can't Be Tamed" favorably. Leah Greenblatt of Entertainment Weekly felt the song was "not bad business for stationary cardio, but not the stuff year-end top tens are made of, either." She said it did not offer "major sensations" and found it similar to Christina Aguilera’s "Not Myself Tonight" (2010). Greenblatt was also disappointed with the song's rhyming in the lines, "I'm not here to sell ya' / Or tell you to go to hell". Sonya Sorich of Ledger-Enquirer said that while she anticipated some negative reception, "Can't Be Tamed" was also a prime candidate for a guilty pleasure dance track." Heather Phares of Allmusic referred to "Can't Be Tamed" as "stomping" and selected it as one of the album's best. Fraser McAlpine of BBC said that though the song has strong sexual undercurrents, Cyrus maintained classy throughout the track . "If Miley's gonna weather the Ensexification Moment it'll be because she's doing it during a period of extrema GaGa, when videos are less about acreage of flesh and more about feathers and Victorian scientists. Oh, and because she's got the songs and the voice, that always helps", McAlpine concluded.

Rob Sheffield of Rolling Stone rated the song three out of five stars and compared it to the musical styles of Rihanna. He added, "It's no 'Party in the U.S.A.' or 'See You Again,' but the chorus packs plenty of electro-fizz pizzazz". Bill Lamb of About.com rated "Can't Be Tamed" two and half out of five stars. He criticized the song for lyrics that headed into a "selfish territory", however, believing it would have airplay success. Monica Herrera of Billboard gave "Can't Be Tamed" a favorable review, writing, "But Cyrus knows how to proffer her sass. When she sneers, 'I'm not a fake, it's in my DNA,' in pre-emptive retaliation against her critics, she does it with the professionalism of a Disney-groomed star." Jarett Wieselman of The New York Post said he liked the song and that though he did not buy Cyrus' "Party in the U.S.A." (2009), he feared he would not "be able to resist" buying "Can't Be Tamed". He said the song had a "naughty old school Britney Spears" vibe, called it "totally catchy" and predicted it would be a summer hit. Ailbhe Malone of The Irish Times wrote, "Miley’s taken a sexy electro-edge. Less "Party in the U.S.A.", more Party With My Parents Away, we like this. A LOT."

== Commercial performance ==
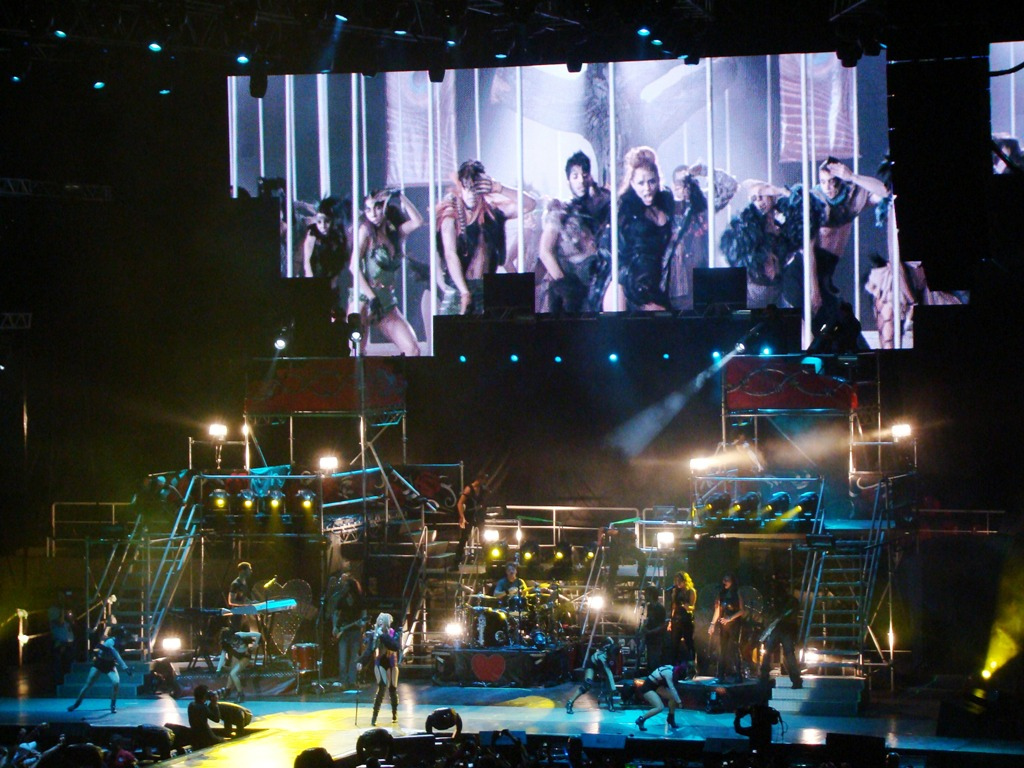
Cyrus performed "Can't Be Tamed" on the Gypsy Heart Tour, with the music video displayed on the screen.

On the week ending June 5, 2010, "Can't Be Tamed" became the week's "hot shot debut" by entering and peaking at number eight on the Billboard Hot 100, selling 191,000 digital downloads. The sales marked Cyrus' second-best debut sales week, following "Party in the U.S.A.", which sold 226,000 digital downloads in its first week in August 2009. With the appearance on the chart, the song became her fourth top ten debut on the Billboard Hot 100, including a song credited to her alias Hannah Montana. In the following week, the song descended ten positions to number 18. It spent its last week on the Billboard Hot 100 on the week ending August 7, 2010, spending a total of ten weeks on the chart. "Can't Be Tamed" also peaked at number 16 on Mainstream Top 40 (Pop Songs). The song peaked at number six on the Canadian Hot 100 and spent a total of 14 weeks upon the chart. As of March 2023, "Can't Be Tamed" has sold 2,000,000 units in the United States and was certified two-times platinum by the Recording Industry Association of America (RIAA).

The song also achieved commercial success in Australia and New Zealand. "Can't Be Tamed" debuted at number 18 on the Australian Singles Chart on the week ending June 6, 2010. After six weeks of ascending the Australian Singles Chart, the song found a new peak at number 17. In the succeeding week, it reached its peak at number 14 and spent 11 weeks on the chart. The single was certified gold by the Australian Recording Industry Association (ARIA) for shipping over 35,000 copies. On the week ending May 24, 2010, "Can't Be Tamed" debuted and peaked at number five on the New Zealand Singles Chart. It spent nine weeks ascending and descending the New Zealand Singles Chart before completely dropping from the chart on the week ending July 19, 2010. In Japan, "Can't Be Tamed" debuted at number 53 and peaked at number 12. In the United Kingdom, "Can't Be Tamed" debuted and peaked at number 13 on the week ending June 12, 2010. It spent eight weeks on the UK Singles Chart. The song peaked at number five on the Irish Singles Chart. In mainland Europe, "Can't Be Tamed" maintained similar outcomes. It became Cyrus' best-charting single on the Eurochart Hot 100 Singles, peaking at number 15 in July 2010 and surpassing "Party in the U.S.A.", which peaked at number 17 in January 2010. It peaked at number 15 on the French Singles Chart, number 15 on the Norwegian Singles Chart, and number 14 on the Spanish Singles Chart. It also charted within the top 30 in Austria and Germany and within the top 40 of Belgium (Flanders and Wallonia).

== Music video ==
=== Background ===
Cyrus bears a black leotard with birdlike accessories as she performs, surrounded by numerous costumed dancers, on a museum exhibit in the music video for "Can't Be Tamed".

The music video for "Can't Be Tamed"' was directed by Robert Hales. The dance routines were choreographed by Jamal Sims, who also choreographed Cyrus' "Hoedown Throwdown". Cyrus and Sims conceived the plot for the video together and proposed it to Hales, who "envisioned it the way [they] did". In regards to the video's theme, Cyrus stated, "I think the video explains my life but it doesn't exclude other people's lives. It's not just about how fabulous and glamorous and all this. It's about the core of 'I don't wanna be in a cage. I want to be free and do what I love'". The video was meant to transition Cyrus away from the good-girl image she had developed through Hannah Montana. However, she believed her fans would be able to identify with the video's message through their own circumstances; for example, she believed that her desire to "stand out [rather] than fit in" was shared by teenagers hoping to break out of high school cliques. In an interview with the singer, Ryan Seacrest noted the video's strong sexual appeal. Cyrus agreed that the video was sexy, though it was not supposed to be the premise: "The video isn't about being sexy or who can wear the less clothes [...] It's about explaining the song and living the lyrics."

=== Development and synopsis ===
The music video was shot on April 10–11, 2010, at Sony Studios in Culver City, California. Over 20 female and 20 male backup dancers were employed. The video stars Cyrus as an exotic songbird breaking out of its cage, symbolizing Cyrus as a singer breaking out of her good-girl image. Before the shoot, Cyrus meticulously recorded her ideas for the video on paper. For example, she chose her backup dancers make-up pallets and contemplated their outfits; while she did not want her dancer's bodies "to look like normal bodies", she also did not want for them to wear scales as, according to her, it would make them resemble to be fish and look scary. Hales wanted Cyrus to resemble a bird without "actually having a beak" or otherwise being overly explicit, so Cyrus' stylists invented bird-like accessories. Among these were arm bands with long leather straps, feathered shoulder pads, and a feathered vest worn over a black leotard and thigh-high black leather boots. Cyrus said she had originally worn a "completely different" outfit, but wasn't "feeling it" the morning of the shoot. "So we made this one right there in the morning, and we added pieces throughout the day... more leather and more feathers. I think it's really fun and kept changing the look," she said. Cyrus' make-up artist, Denika Bedrossian, focused on the singer's eyes; he used "rich jewel-toned shades" and eyelashes with feathered tips to give Cyrus a "deep peacock eye". In cut-scenes, Cyrus wears a corset made of 2,400 silver metal pieces and numerous peacock feathers. It was designed by The Blonds, debuted during their fall 2010 fashion show, and cost $25,000.

The video commences with formally dressed spectators entering a museum as a curator introduces "a creature so rare it was believed to be extinct. In captivity for the first time, the rarest creature on Earth, Avis Cyrus." White curtains are pulled down to reveal Cyrus, dressed in a black leotard and expansive black CGI wings, asleep in a giant bird nest locked inside a giant cage. Cyrus rises and approaches the audience, but a camera flash startles her and causes her to shield her face with her wings. The music starts, and Cyrus unveils herself again and joins a large group of feathered dancers. As Cyrus sings, she and the dancers escape the cage and prowl the museum, shattering museum exhibits as they pass them. They perform provocative dances both inside the cage and in darkened museum halls. Cut-scenes feature Cyrus lying down, dressed in a silver corset attached to a bed of peacock feathers, or writhing alone in her nest in the cage. The video ends with Cyrus back in her cage and the museum empty and trashed.

=== Reception ===
The video premiered on May 4, 2010, on E! News. The video received generally positive reviews from critics. It also received numerous comparisons to videos by Britney Spears and Lady Gaga, though Cyrus said she "wanted it to be something different for a female artist". Cristina Gibson of E! described the video as "edgy", similar to Cyrus' video for "Party in the U.S.A.", but "on steroids". Tina Warren of MTV News said the video was a good step toward ridding Cyrus of her good-girl image and gave the video a positive review, calling it "intriguing" and stating, "The video [...] is actually quite magnetic and you can’t look away". Tanner Stransky of Entertainment Weekly agreed. While he acknowledged the video "might be dark and a tad conceptually racy", he claimed it was smart move. "She isn’t moving too fast, honestly [...] it’s not like Miley is stripping or baring much skin". Rather, Stransky said Cyrus had "some super-fun dance moves" and "[made] a statement", albeit a darker one. The official newspaper of the Central Committee of the Chinese Communist Party, People's Daily, said the video featured "bold" costumes and "revealed Cyrus' sexy side". The website, Yahoo! added the video to the list of "Worst Music Videos of 2010" Daniel Rutledge of 3 News in New Zealand said Cyrus had made "it very clear she wishes to cast aside any resemblance to the Disney alter ego that made her famous and be regarded from now on as an adult singer." Singaporean newspaper My Paper defended Cyrus against claims that the video was too provocative and reported, "If nothing else, this vid shows that Cyrus knows how to entertain, and marks the beginning of truly high-quality videos." Mary Elizabeth Williams of Salon.com offered a contrary opinion, stating that while Cyrus is a "talented singer [who] deserves to break out of her Disney mold", the "Can't Be Tamed" music video was poor. Williams said Cyrus has "talent galore" and "incredible pipes", but her video was "predictable, derivative and dumb" due to its unoriginality. According to People magazine, online reaction to the music video has been greatly varied. "Fans and bloggers lit up the Web with comments ranging from 'stunning, gorgeous, fierce' to 'wow way too much for someone her age'", the magazine reported. NME put the video at number 28 on their list of the "50 Worst Music Videos Ever".

== Live performances ==
Cyrus first performed "Can't Be Tamed" live on May 18, 2010, on Dancing With the Stars. Donning the black leotard and accessories used in the music video, Cyrus appeared in a human-sized cage and then performed throughout the stage with many costumed backup dancers; Cyrus' dancing was minimal. Her first performance of the song outside the United States was at the Rock in Rio concert in Lisbon, Portugal on May 29, 2010. Cyrus appeared on June 1, 2010, at the Paris nightclub 1515 Club and on June 3, 2010, on Britain's Got Talent's semifinals to perform "Can't Be Tamed". On the latter, Cyrus wore hot pants, fishnets and boots as she performed. Midway through the performance, Cyrus grabbed a female backup dancer, dipping her low, and simulated a kiss. The performance was met with negative reactions from the media and caused her to release a statement in which Cyrus promised she did not kiss the backup dancer. Cyrus wrote, "It is ridiculous that two entertainers can’t even rock out with each other without the media making it some type of story. I really hope my fans are not disappointed in me because the truth is I did nothing wrong. I got up there and did my job which is to perform to the best of my ability." Cyrus later performed the song at the Rock in Rio concert in Madrid, Spain and the London nightclubs Heaven and G-A-Y. She has performed the track on Good Morning America, Late Show with David Letterman, MuchMusic Video Awards in Canada, and concert at the House of Blues in Los Angeles, California, which was streamed across over 30 websites owned by MTV Networks.

Cyrus performed the song during the Gypsy Heart Tour as well as her Bangerz Tour. She wore a black sequined bra and furry monochrome chaps with falconry gloves during the performance. She was also accompanied by an enormous replica of her dog, Floyd. The performance received positive reviews from critics.

== Charts ==
=== Weekly charts ===
Weekly chart performance for "Can't Be Tamed"
Chart (2010)	Peak position
Australia (ARIA)	14
Austria (Ö3 Austria Top 40)	21
Belgium (Ultratop 50 Flanders)	39
Belgium (Ultratop 50 Wallonia)	40
Canada Hot 100 (Billboard)	6
France (SNEP)	15
Germany (GfK)	29
Ireland (IRMA)	5
Italy (FIMI)	45
Japan Hot 100 (Billboard)	12
Netherlands (Single Top 100)	82
New Zealand (Recorded Music NZ)	5
Norway (VG-lista)	15
Scottish Singles Sales (Official Charts)	7
South Korea Foreign (Circle)	27
Spain (Promusicae)	14
Sweden (Sverigetopplistan)	42
Switzerland (Schweizer Hitparade)	53
UK Singles (Official Charts)	13
US Billboard Hot 100	8
US Pop Airplay (Billboard)	16

=== Year-end charts ===
Year-end chart performance for "Can't Be Tamed"
Chart (2010)	Position
Canada (Canadian Hot 100)	92
France (SNEP)	86
UK Singles (OCC)	189

== Certifications ==
Certifications and sales for "Can't Be Tamed"
Region	Certification	Certified units/sales
Australia (ARIA)	2× Platinum	140,000^{‡}
Brazil (Pro-Música Brasil)	Gold	30,000^{‡}
United Kingdom (BPI)	Silver	200,000^{‡}
United States (RIAA)	2× Platinum	2,000,000^{‡}
^{‡} Sales+streaming figures based on certification alone.

== Release history ==
Release dates and formats for "Can't Be Tamed"
Region	Date	Format	Label	Ref.
United States	May 3, 2010	Radio airplay	Hollywood	
United States	May 18, 2010	Digital download	Hollywood	
United Kingdom	May 27, 2010	CD	Hollywood	
