= Gypsy Heart Tour =

2011 concert tour by Miley Cyrus

- Tour by Miley Cyrus
- Promotional poster for the tour
- Location: Latin America; Asia; Australia
- Associated album: Can't Be Tamed
- Start date: April 29, 2011
- End date: July 2, 2011
- Legs: 3
- No. of shows: 13 in Latin America; 1 in Asia; 7 in Australia; 21 in total
- Box office: $30 million (Note: US$42.94 million in 2025 dollars.)

Miley Cyrus concert chronology
- Wonder World Tour (2009); Gypsy Heart Tour (2011); Bangerz Tour (2014)

The Gypsy Heart Tour (also known as Corazón Gitano Tour in Spanish-speaking regions) was the third concert tour by American singer Miley Cyrus, held in support of her third studio album Can't Be Tamed (2010). It visited primally Latin America, Australia, and the Philippines; it began on April 29, 2011 in Quito, Ecuador and concluded on July 2, 2011 in Perth, Australia. It was her first tour not to visit the United States. The tour ranked 22nd in Pollstar's "Top 50 Worldwide Tours (Mid-Year)", earning $30 million.

== Background ==
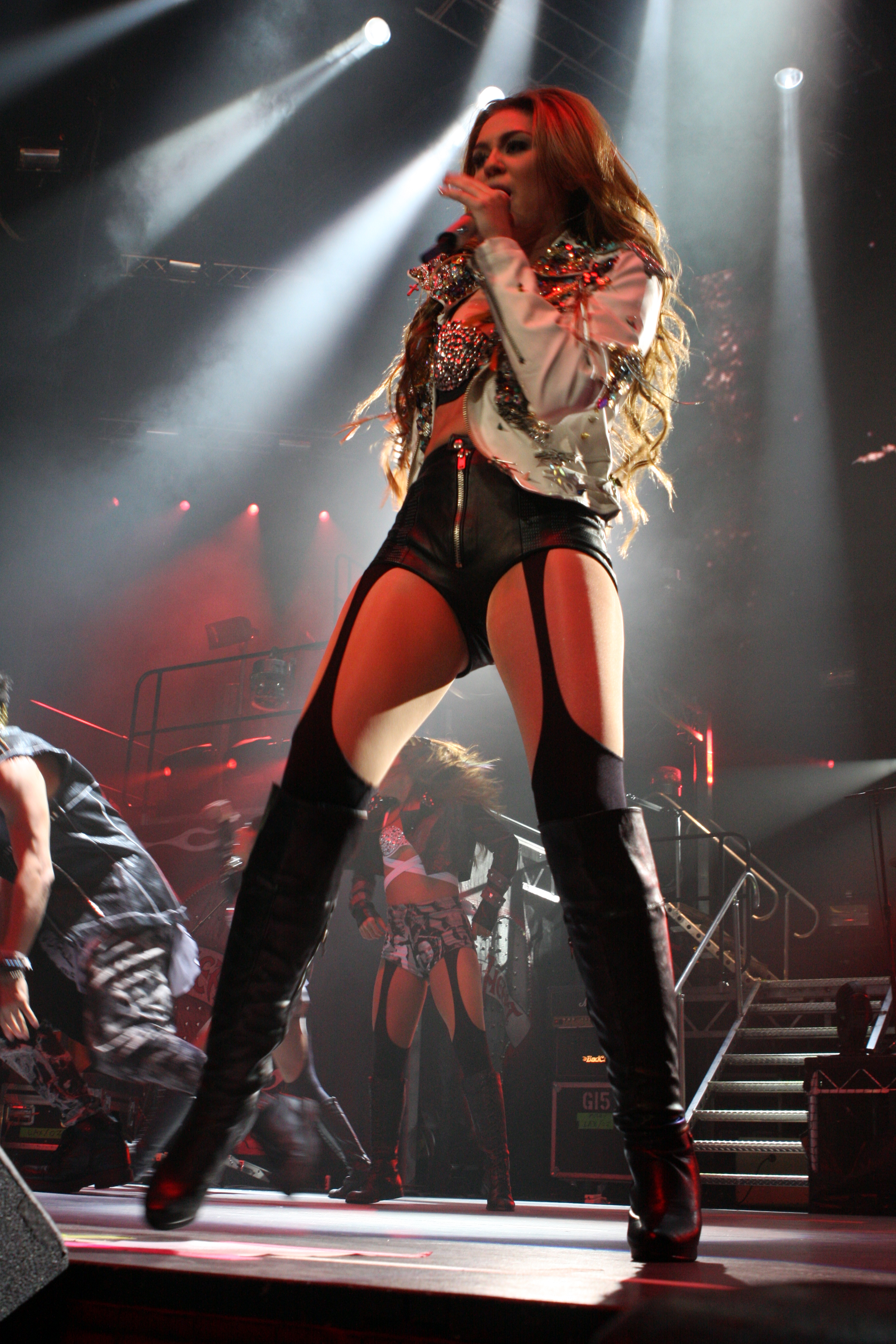
Cyrus performing in Sydney

The Gypsy Heart tour is a dream come true. Not only because of all the beautiful cities I will get to visit, but all of the beautiful people I will get to meet. Gypsy Heart is not just a tour for me, but a mission to spread love

The tour was announced by media outlets on March 21, 2011, following Cyrus' appearance on Saturday Night Live. Initial tour dates were announced in South America. Dates in Australia, the Philippines, Costa Rica, Panama and Mexico soon followed. During an interview with OK!, Cyrus said she would not bring the tour to the United States due to not feeling comfortable to perform in the country. Many media outlets believed this was due to Cyrus' personal life. She commented:

"I just think right now America has gotten to a place where I don't know if they want me to tour or not. Right now I just want to go to the places where I am getting the most love and Australia and South America have done that for me. I'm kind of going to the places where I get the most love. I don't want to go anywhere where I don't feel completely comfortable with it."

Cyrus stated the tour would not be in the same vein as her previous efforts. She said her previous tour, Wonder World Tour, focused more on theatrics and costume changes. The singer wanted the show to focus on the music and letting the audience see a different side of her that is not portrayed on television. She said the show would feature an acoustic section, along with taking requests from the audience.

== Set list ==
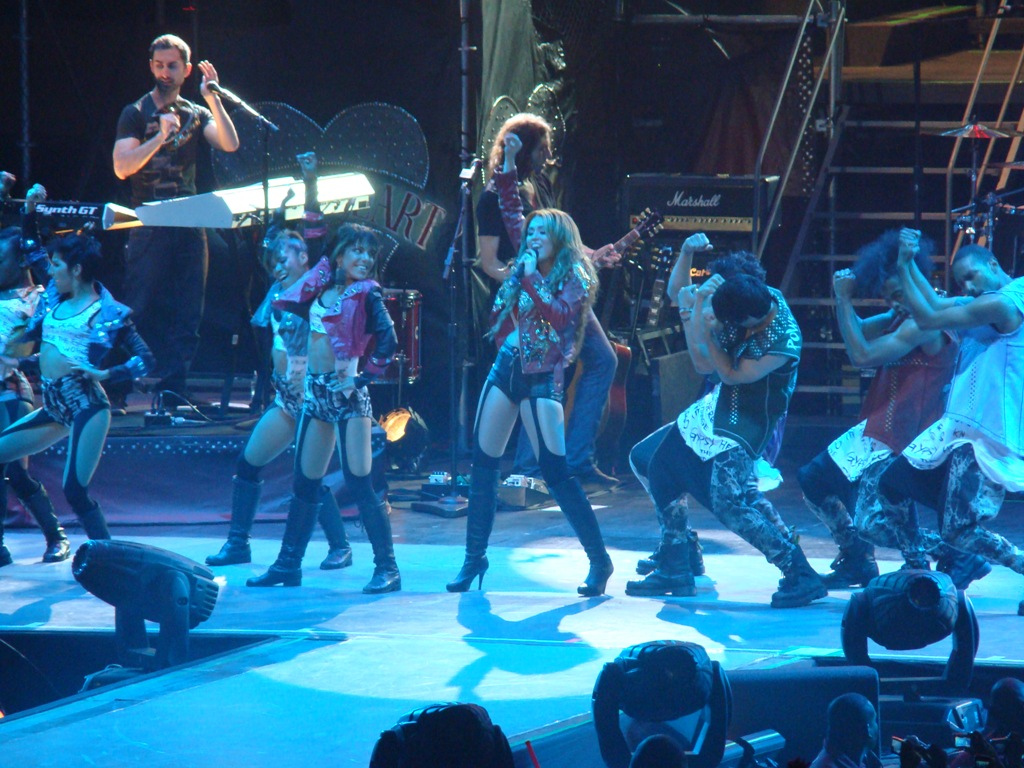
Cyrus performing "Party in the U.S.A."

This set list is from the May 6 show in Buenos Aires, Argentina. It is not intended to represent all tour dates, and it has cover songs

1. "Liberty Walk"
2. "Party in the U.S.A."
3. "Kicking and Screaming"
4. "Robot"
5. "I Love Rock 'n' Roll" / "Cherry Bomb" / "Bad Reputation"
6. "Every Rose Has Its Thorn"
7. "Obsessed"
8. "Forgiveness and Love"
9. "Fly on the Wall"
10. "7 Things"
11. "Scars"
12. "Smells Like Teen Spirit"
13. "Can't Be Tamed"
14. "Landslide"
15. "Take Me Along"
16. "Two More Lonely People"
17. "The Climb"

Encore

18. "See You Again"
19. "My Heart Beats for Love"
20. "Who Owns My Heart"

=== Notes ===
- Starting with the show in Asuncion, "The Driveway" replaced "Two More Lonely People".
- In San José, Cyrus performed "Stay".
- In Perth, Cyrus performed a cover of Gorillaz's "On Melancholy Hill".

== Tour dates ==
List of 2011 concerts
Date	City	Country	Venue	Attendance	Revenue
April 29	Quito	Ecuador	Estadio Olímpico Atahualpa	27,352 / 27,352	—
May 1	Lima	Peru	Explanada del Monumental	30,013 / 30,700	—
May 4	Santiago	Chile	Estadio Nacional	42,805 / 46,190	—
May 6	Buenos Aires	Argentina	River Plate Stadium	68,269 / 68,269	—
May 10	Asunción	Paraguay	Hipódromo de Asunción	24,834 / 24,834	$1,458,345
May 13	Rio de Janeiro	Brazil	HSBC Arena	14,145 / 14,145	$1,595,236
May 14	São Paulo	Brazil	Arena Anhembi	22,285 / 29,320	$3,575,180
May 17	Caracas	Venezuela	Estadio de Fútbol de la USB	5,087 / 6,200	$1,828,950
May 19 (Note: The May 19 show at Coliseo Cubierto El Campín, Bogota, was originally scheduled to be performed in the Simón Bolívar Park, but was moved.)	Bogotá	Colombia	Coliseo Cubierto El Campín	10,957 / 10,957	—
May 21	San José	Costa Rica	Estadio Nacional	33,451 / 33,451	—
May 24	Panama City	Panama	Figali Convention Center	10,250 / 10,250	—
May 26	Mexico City	Mexico	Foro Sol	31,200 / 31,200	$2,796,984
May 28	Zapopan	Mexico	Estadio Omnilife	35,460 / 35,460	$3,000,418
June 17	Pasay	Philippines	SM Mall of Asia Concert Grounds	16,782 / 18,000	—
June 21	Brisbane	Australia	Brisbane Entertainment Centre	11,293 / 11,293	$1,016,120
June 23	Melbourne	Australia	Rod Laver Arena	25,109 / 25,109	$2,186,990
June 24	Melbourne	Australia	Rod Laver Arena	25,109 / 25,109	$2,186,990
June 26	Sydney	Australia	Acer Arena	26,839 / 26,839	$2,485,360
June 27	Sydney	Australia	Acer Arena	26,839 / 26,839	$2,485,360
June 29	Adelaide	Australia	Adelaide Entertainment Centre	8,374 / 8,374	$765,677
July 2	Perth	Australia	Burswood Dome	15,601 / 15,601	$1,359,070
Total				460,106 / 473,544 (97%)	$22,068,330
