= I'm Still Good =

Single by Hannah Montana

from the album Hannah Montana Forever
- Released: December 10, 2010
- Recorded: 2010
- Genre: Pop rock; pop punk; dance-rock
- Length: 3:17
- Label: Walt Disney
- Songwriters: Jennie Lurie; Aris Archontis; Chen Neeman
- Producers: Jennie Lurie; Aris Archontis; Chen Neeman

Miley Cyrus singles chronology
"Gonna Get This" (2010)	"I'm Still Good" (2010)	"Decisions" (2012)

"I'm Still Good" is a song by fictional character Hannah Montana, recorded by American singer and actress Miley Cyrus for the soundtrack album Hannah Montana Forever (2010), which accompanied the fourth and final season of the Disney Channel series Hannah Montana. It was released by Walt Disney Records on December 10, 2010 as the fourth and final single from the soundtrack album, as well as the last release by the Hannah Montana character.

== Background and composition ==
"I'm Still Good" is a song with a length of three minutes seconds and written by Jennie Lurie, Aris Archontis, Chen Neeman.

== Music video ==
A music video premiered showing Miley Cyrus as Hannah Montana singing on stage. Miley cancels a special father-daughter afternoon with her dad to go on a first date with Jesse instead. She gets mad when Jesse answers a phone call from his father because she blew off her father to spend time with him, but Jesse tells her that his dad is stationed in Afghanistan and they hardly ever get to talk. Miley then realizes how lucky she is to still have her dad and goes home to have a father-daughter evening with him. The music video for "I'm Still Good" was directed by "Chen Neeman" who also directed the song. The music video was released during an episode of Hannah Montana Forever, in the episode "Been Here All Along" together with the songs "Been Here All Along" and "Que Sera". The video features a concert as Hannah sings to her fans. During the video, clips of families are shown giving their love to family members who are in the service.
