= Ordinary Girl (Hannah Montana song) =

Single by Hannah Montana

from the album Hannah Montana Forever
- Released: July 6, 2010
- Recorded: 2010
- Genre: Pop rock; teen pop
- Length: 2:57
- Label: Walt Disney
- Songwriters: Toby Gad; Arama Brown
- Producer: Toby Gad

Miley Cyrus singles chronology
"Can't Be Tamed" (2010)	"Ordinary Girl" (2010)	"Who Owns My Heart" (2010)

"Ordinary Girl" is a song by fictional character Hannah Montana, recorded by American singer and actress Miley Cyrus for the soundtrack album Hannah Montana Forever (2010), which accompanied the fourth and final season of the Disney Channel series Hannah Montana. It was released by Walt Disney Records on July 6, 2010 as the lead single from the soundtrack album. Lyrically, the track speaks about how Montana might be famous, but she is just an ordinary girl underneath.

== Background and composition ==
"Ordinary Girl" (2010)
An audio sample of Hannah Montana's "Ordinary Girl" featuring the first chorus of the song.

"Ordinary Girl" was written by Toby Gad and Arama Brown, and was released as the lead single from Hannah Montana Forever. It premiered on Radio Disney on July 2, 2010 and was released on July 6, 2010 to all digital outlets. On October 15, 2010, the song was released as a CD single. It is featured in the second episode of Hannah Montana Forever (final season), "Hannah Montana to the Principal's Office". "Ordinary Girl" is a song with a length of two minutes and fifty-nine seconds.

== Reception ==
Stephanie Bruzzese of CommonSenseMedia stated that the song's "solid, snappy guitar hook is backed by catchy percussive clapping and a chorus of cute young voices — a set-up that sounds more suited to Miley's maturing vocals." The song debuted at ninety-eight on the US Hot Digital Songs chart for the week ending July 11, 2010, then peaked at #49 two weeks later. The song has also debuted at #91 on Billboard's US Hot 100 on the week dated July 31, 2010. It spent two weeks at its peak, then fell off the chart.

== Music video ==
Unlike other Hannah Montana music videos, "Ordinary Girl" is not a concert taping performance. Hannah in the video is also a model, and not Miley Cyrus, as Miley Cyrus refused to appear in the video. It premiered on July 2, 2010 and starts out in Montana's dressing room where she is getting ready for a concert. She uses her video camera to tape everything that goes on, leading up to her stepping onstage, where a screaming crowd is waiting. She waves, then hands the camera to a girl in the front row of the concert. The video then flashes to a school room where the girl has a party with her friends after receiving the camera, while shots from the Hannah Montana season 3 concert are playing on the chalk boards. The camera is then passed onto another girl who bumps into a boy who begins talking to her. R5 artists Riker and Ross Lynch are seen in the classroom. The music video additionally features a then unknown Cooper Koch.

== Track listings ==
- U.S. digital download
1. "Ordinary Girl" (Album Version) – 2:57
- EU 2-Track CD Single
1. "Ordinary Girl" (Album Version) – 2:57
2. "Ordinary Girl" (Instrumental) – 2:57

== Charts ==
Chart performance for "Ordinary Girl"
Chart (2010)	Peak position
UK Singles (Official Charts)	93
US Billboard Hot 100	91

== Certification ==
Region	Certification	Certified units/sales
United States (RIAA)	Gold	500,000^{‡}
^{‡} Sales+streaming figures based on certification alone.

== Release history ==
Region	Date	Format	Label
United States	July 2, 2010	Radio Disney	Walt Disney Records
United States	July 6, 2010	Digital download	Walt Disney Records
Germany	October 15, 2010	CD single	Walt Disney Records
