= Can't Be Tamed =

2010 studio album by Miley Cyrus

Studio album by Miley Cyrus
- Released: June 18, 2010
- Recorded: 2009–2010
- Genre: Dance-pop
- Length: 44:08
- Label: Hollywood
- Producers: Rock Mafia; John Shanks

Miley Cyrus chronology
The Time of Our Lives (2009)	Can't Be Tamed (2010)	Hannah Montana Forever (2010)

Singles from Can't Be Tamed
- 1. "Can't Be Tamed" Released: May 3, 2010; 2. "Who Owns My Heart" Released: October 22, 2010

Can't Be Tamed is the third studio album by American singer Miley Cyrus. It was released on June 18, 2010, by Hollywood Records, and was her final album with the label; she signed with RCA Records in early 2013. Cyrus wrote and began recording the project in late 2009, while traveling internationally for her Wonder World Tour, and completed it in early 2010. Described by Cyrus as a "good [record] to blast in your car", Can't Be Tamed represents a musical departure from her earlier work, which she had grown to feel uninspired by. The efforts resulted in a primarily dance-pop record, which Cyrus' record label acknowledged differed from the original plans for the project. Its lyrical themes revolve around breaking free of constraints and expectations, which are largely mentioned in the context of romantic relationships. Most of the album was produced by Rock Mafia and John Shanks. Cyrus co-wrote eleven out of twelve songs on the album, with the only one not being written by her being a cover of "Every Rose Has Its Thorn" by glam metal band Poison.

Upon its release, Can't Be Tamed received generally mixed reviews from music critics, who perceived lack of musical focus and a failure to fully establish Cyrus' maturing public image; additional criticism was placed on her vocals sounding over-processed and lacking emotional depth. It was unable to replicate the success of her earlier work, debuting at number three on the US Billboard 200 with first-week sales of 102,000 copies. The album has sold over 350,000 copies in the United States. Can't Be Tamed charted moderately on record charts in internationally, reaching the top-ten in countries including Australia, Canada, and the United Kingdom.

Two singles were released from Can't Be Tamed. Its title track "Can't Be Tamed" was released on May 3, 2010, and peaked at number eight on the US Billboard Hot 100, and performed moderately worldwide. "Who Owns My Heart" was released on October 22, 2010, as the second single in Germany. Promotional efforts for Can't Be Tamed began to associate Cyrus with an increasingly provocative image, an effort continued with her fourth studio album Bangerz (2013). The record was primarily promoted through a series of television appearances and Cyrus' headlining Gypsy Heart Tour in 2011.

== Background and production ==
I want to do my last pop record. I'm working on a record right now. I kind of want this to be my last record for a little while and be able to take a break and just get all the types of music that I really love ... you know, my favorite styles, because in a few years, as I grow up, so will my fans, and I won't have to focus on that as much, and I'll be able to have more of the sound of music that I'm into.

— Cyrus, describing the artistic transition she experienced during the production of Can't Be Tamed, MTV News.

In December 2009, Cyrus announced that she had begun planning her third studio album and intended to begin a musical hiatus after its completion. She expressed concerns that her newer material "doesn't truly inspire me" and worried that she would be "blending in with everyone else", although she later commented that the final product was inspired by techno music qualities commonly used by recording artist Lady Gaga. Abby Konowitch from Cyrus' label Hollywood Records admitted that the record drew more inspiration from dance-pop music than she originally intended, but maintained that it "feels very comfortable for her, and it feels very comfortable in terms of the state of contemporary music".

The majority of Can't Be Tamed was recorded abroad during Cyrus' headlining Wonder World Tour in 2009 and 2010. She collaborated with John Shanks during its production; he frequently traveled to London for the recording sessions, and returned to Los Angeles to finalize the material. Cyrus also collaborated with the production team Rock Mafia, consisting of Antonina Armato and Tim James; they notably produced her earlier singles "See You Again" and "7 Things" from her first and second studio albums Meet Miley Cyrus (2007) and Breakout (2008), respectively. Cyrus stated that Can't Be Tamed contained a variety of dance beats and synths, but believed that its sound was secondary to the personal lyrics therein.

== Release and artwork ==
In February 2010, Cyrus announced that her then-untitled third studio album would be released later that summer, which she felt was appropriate because it is "good to blast in your car". Later that April, it was announced that the record would be titled Can't Be Tamed, and would be released on June 22, 2010, in the United States. Consequently, it became the first project from Hollywood Records to be released under the "day-and-date" format, which allowed the project to be released nearly simultaneously worldwide instead of traditionally "staggering" its launch to accommodate "the availability of the artist" internationally. On May 7, Cyrus unveiled the album artwork through her website; it depicts Cyrus dressed in a leather jacket, pants, and midriff-baring shirt while standing against a black-and-white background. It was noted for establishing an increasingly provocative public image for Cyrus; her stylist Simone Harouche stated that it was inspired by singer Joan Jett and the band Blondie, and was "basically a strong statement saying in the most simple way, that she can't be tamed–literally and metaphorically." A deluxe version of the record was simultaneously released, which included the audio disc packaged with the standard version in addition to a bonus DVD that includes previously unseen footage from Cyrus' performance at The O2 Arena during the Wonder World Tour.

== Composition ==
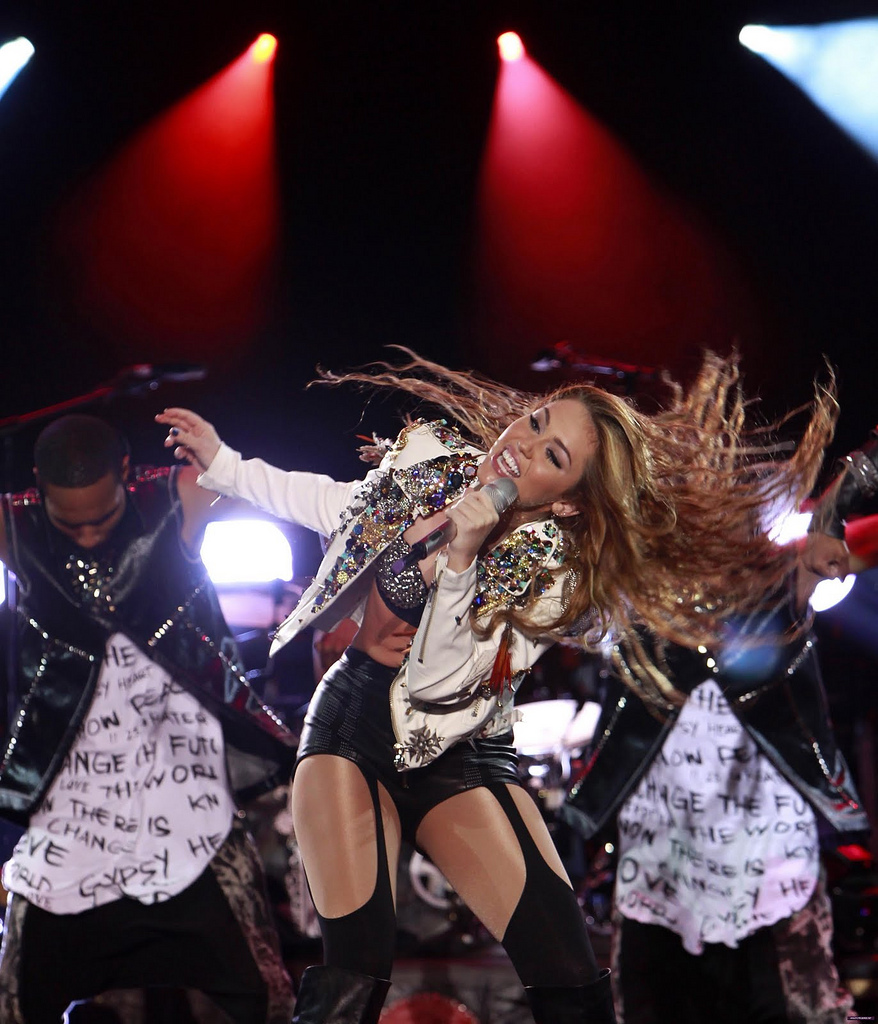
Cyrus performing in Pasay City, Philippines, during her Gypsy Heart Tour, 2011.

Can't Be Tamed is primarily a dance-pop record; it contains "several bass-heavy, slickly produced dance numbers" that Ann Donahue from Billboard joked "thunder in such a catchy, accessible way that it may make Kesha down another bottle of Jack out of envy." Its opening track "Liberty Walk" describes an individual who leaves a harmful relationship, which Cyrus felt leaned towards more meaningful lyrical content instead of the "super shallow" current mainstream music. "Who Owns My Heart" details the excitement in possibly finding a lover at a nightclub, while Cyrus herself commented that the title track "Can't Be Tamed" bears a theme of "breaking out and feeling free". It is followed by a cover version of one of Cyrus' favorite songs, "Every Rose Has Its Thorn", originally performed by the band Poison for their second studio album Open Up and Say... Ahh! (1988); she stated that the modern-day music industry "shelters kids [from] songs as honest and real as this one", and added that a consultation with the band's lead singer Bret Michaels helped her to incorporate her "own flare and edge" to the track, which she deemed "a classic".

"Two More Lonely People" was described by Evan Sawdey of PopMatters as "one moment of carefree dance-pop joy" that was reminiscent of material from her earlier Hannah Montana soundtracks; he also stated that the lyrics delivered in "Forgiveness and Love" were among the "more over-the-top cutesy moments" throughout the record, specifically commenting that the lines "The only thing that / Our hearts are made of / Are the acts of forgiveness and love" were "so unbelievably saccharine that Hallmark would ultimately have to turn them down". Robert Ham from Christianity Today felt that "Permanent December" discussed the story of "the devoted girlfriend pushing aside the 'sexy boys' vying for her affections", while "Stay" addressed the difficulties in maintaining a long-distance relationship.

Writing for AllMusic, Heather Phares noted that "Scars" exemplified Cyrus' equating of "grown-up with joyless", adding that the track fails to find the "emotional depth" Cyrus was likely intending. She also described "Take Me Along" as one of the more "overwrought ballads" where Cyrus' delivery seemed more comfortable than others on the record. Leah Greenblatt from Entertainment Weekly felt that "Robot" highlighted the theme of defiance and rebellion seen throughout Can't Be Tamed, specifically noting the lyrics "Stand here, sell this, and hit your mark / I would scream but I'm just this hollow shell". The record closes with the twelfth track "My Heart Beats for Love", which according to Ham, describes "the more universal ideal of love for all"; Greenblatt also recognized the integration of organ instrumentation.

== Singles ==
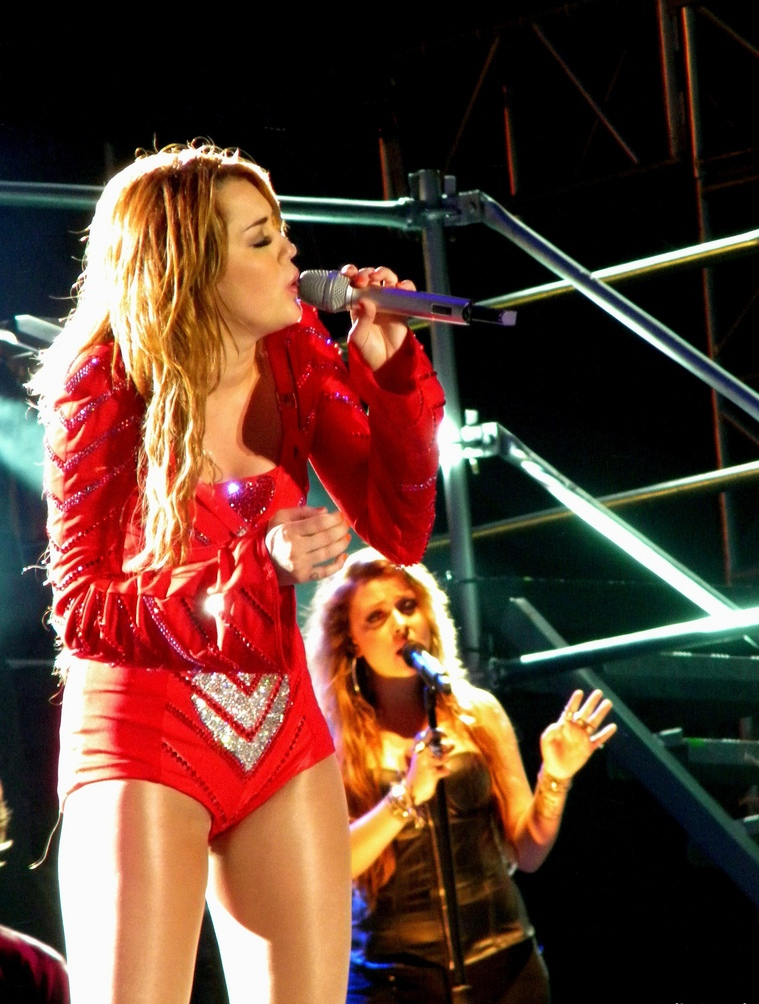
Cyrus performing during her Gypsy Heart Tour in São Paulo, 2011.

"Can't Be Tamed" was released as the lead single from Can't Be Tamed on May 3, 2010. It received generally favorable reviews from music critics, who appreciated its electropop influences. The track debuted at number eight on the US Billboard Hot 100 with first-week digital downloads of 191,000 copies, although it performed moderately internationally. An accompanying music video for the song was directed by Robert Hales, and was premiered through E! News on May 4, 2010. It follows Cyrus and her back-up dancers dressed in bird-like clothing as they escape a cage and trash a museum.

"Who Owns My Heart" was released as the second single from Can't Be Tamed later that year. It generated mixed reviews from music critics, who felt that its production was generic. It reached the top 40 of the German record charts. The accompanying music video for the track was also directed by Hales, and was released on October 22, 2010.

== Promotion ==
Hollywood Records focused on television appearances when further promoting Can't Be Tamed, which they expected would accommodate Cyrus' schedule more effectively than traditional interviews with the press and radio stations. She first performed "Can't Be Tamed" on May 18, 2010, during the tenth season of Dancing with the Stars in the United States. Cyrus later traveled to Europe to perform at the Rock in Rio concerts in Lisbon on May 29 and Madrid on June 6; she sang "Can't Be Tamed", "Robot" and "My Heart Beats for Love" there. Meanwhile, she played concerts in 1515 Club in Paris (June 1) and G-A-Y nightclub in London (June 5). On June 3 she sang "Can't Be Tamed" on Britain's Got Talent. After returning to the United States, Cyrus held a concert at the House of Blues in Los Angeles on June 16. Her performance was later re-broadcast by MTV through thirty of its international websites, reaching approximately 160 countries; it was made available for on-demand streaming the following day. She also sang "Can't Be Tamed" on TV shows such as Late Show with David Letterman (June 17), Good Morning America (June 18), both in New York City, and 2010 MuchMusic Video Awards in Toronto (June 20), On Good Morning America she also sang "Every Rose Has Its Thorn" with Bret Michaels. In November, Cyrus flew to Europe to sing "Who Owns My Heart" on Wetten, dass..? (November 6) and 2010 MTV Europe Music Awards (November 7). On November 21, she performed "Forgiveness and Love" on American Music Awards of 2010 in Los Angeles.

Cyrus launched her headlining Gypsy Heart Tour in April 2011, for which she traveled internationally.

== Critical reception ==
Professional ratings
Aggregate scores
Source	Rating
AnyDecentMusic?	3.4/10
Metacritic	48/100
Review scores
Source	Rating
AllMusic	3/5 stars
Billboard	3/5 stars
Entertainment Weekly	B−
The Guardian	2/5 stars
PopMatters	2/10
Rolling Stone	3/5 stars
Sputnikmusic	2.5/5
The Sydney Morning Herald	2/5 stars
The Telegraph	2/5 stars
USA Today	1.5/4 stars

Upon release, Can't Be Tamed received mixed reviews from music critics. At Metacritic, which assigns a normalized rating out of 100 to reviews from mainstream critics, Can't Be Tamed received an average score of 48, which indicates "mixed or average reviews", based on nine reviews. Heather Phares from AllMusic shared a similar sentiment in regards to its production, suggesting that the excessive use of Auto-Tune limited Cyrus' ability to express genuine emotion, adding that several tracks were similar to "Tik Tok" by Kesha "minus that song's mindless fun". A writer for Billboard also noted a lack of emotion in Cyrus' vocals, but considered the "delightfully robo-country" cover version of "Every Rose Has Its Thorn" as the standout track from the record.

Writing for The Boston Globe, James Reed questioned the need to "tame" Cyrus, given that "this stuff is already pretty innocuous". However, he acknowledged that Can't Be Tamed contained "the catchiest Top 40 hits money can buy." Referencing the lyrics in "Every Rose Has Its Thorn", Leah Greenblatt from Entertainment Weekly felt that Cyrus was "just not (yet) that thorny a girl" despite visible efforts of rebellion. Alexis Petridis of The Guardian thought that Cyrus lost sight of her target audience with the project, noting that "if you're old enough to stay up after 9:00 PM without asking permission, it's not intended for you" while also commenting that children that may be interested in the record had likely "transferred their affections" to the then-teenage Justin Bieber. Writing for Rolling Stone, Rob Sheffield opined that the production used throughout Can't Be Tamed felt too generic for its goal of rebellion.

Theon Weber of The Village Voice felt that Cyrus' attempts of maturity were too similar to those of Christina Aguilera and Britney Spears in their earlier years, and commented that the album itself was "sadly wan". Evan Sawdey from PopMatters shared the same concern, additionally noting the irony that Cyrus' first project after Hannah Montana was released through the Disney-owned Hollywood Records. Elysa Gardner from USA Today opined that Cyrus had successfully "made the full leap from tween queen to pop tart" with the music video for "Can't Be Tamed", but failed to maintain this image with "generic, anonymous tunes" on the parent album.

== Commercial performance ==
In the United States, Can't Be Tamed debuted at number three on the Billboard 200 with first-week sales of 102,000 copies, behind the 741,000 and 447,000 copies moved by Recovery by Eminem and Thank Me Later by Drake, respectively. The record was viewed as a commercial disappointment in the country, given that Cyrus' second studio album Breakout (2008) debuted at number one on the chart with first-week sales of 371,000 copies. As of January 2014, the album has moved 350,000 units in the United States. Can't Be Tamed reached number two on the Canadian Albums Chart, and peaked at number ten on the Top 100 Mexico.

Can't Be Tamed performed moderately on national record charts in Europe. It peaked at number one on the Spanish PROMUSICAE, and reached the top-five on the Ö3 Austria Top 40, German Media Control Charts, Greek IFPI, Hungarian MAHASZ, Irish IRMA, Italian FIMI, and Swiss Hitparade. Furthermore, the record peaked in the top-ten on the Flanders and Wallonia regions of the Belgian Ultratop, Norwegian VG-lista, and the UK Albums Chart. In the latter country, the album was certified silver by the British Phonographic Industry. Can't Be Tamed charted in the lower ends of the Danish Tracklisten, Dutch MegaCharts, The Official Finnish Charts, French SNEP, and the Swedish Sverigetopplistan. It did, however, attain a gold certification in Poland. In Oceania, Can't Be Tamed peaked at numbers two and four on the Official New Zealand Music Chart and the Australian ARIA Charts, respectively. In the latter nation, it was recognized with a gold certification.

== Track listing ==
Credits adapted from the liner notes of Can't Be Tamed.

Can't Be Tamed track listing
No.	Title	Writer(s)	Producer(s)	Length
1.	"Liberty Walk"	Miley Cyrus; Antonina Armato; Tim James; Nicholas J. Scapa; John Read Fasse; Michael McGinnis	Rock Mafia; Devrim Karaoglu^{[a]}	4:06
2.	"Who Owns My Heart"	Cyrus; Armato; James; Karaoglu	Rock Mafia	3:35
3.	"Can't Be Tamed"	Cyrus; Armato; James; Marek Pompetzki; Paul NZA	Rock Mafia; Karaoglu^{[a]}; Pompetzki^{[a]}	2:48
4.	"Every Rose Has Its Thorn"	Bret Michaels; Rikki Rockett; Bobby Dall; C.C. DeVille	Rock Mafia	3:48
5.	"Two More Lonely People"	Cyrus; Kevin Kadish; Brandon Jane; Angie Aparo; Armato	Rock Mafia	3:10
6.	"Forgiveness and Love"	Cyrus; Armato; James; Adam Schmalholz	Rock Mafia	3:28
7.	"Permanent December"	Cyrus; John Shanks; Claude Kelly	Shanks	3:38
8.	"Stay"	Cyrus; Shanks	Shanks	4:22
9.	"Scars"	Cyrus; Shanks	Shanks	3:42
10.	"Take Me Along"	Cyrus; Shanks	Shanks	4:09
11.	"Robot"	Cyrus; Shanks	Shanks	3:43
12.	"My Heart Beats for Love"	Cyrus; Shanks; Hillary Lindsey; Gordie Sampson	Shanks	3:43
Total length:				44:15

=== Notes ===
- ^{^[a]} signifies a co-producer
- "Every Rose Has Its Thorn" is a cover of the song by Poison, which was released in 1988.
- iTunes Store edition includes the Rockangeles Remix of "Can't Be Tamed" featuring Lil Jon
- Deluxe CD edition includes the bonus DVD Miley Cyrus: Live from London which contains nineteen live performances and behind-the-scenes footage.
- Japanese and UK editions include a bonus DVD featuring the making of and the music video "Can't Be Tamed", live performances of "Fly on the Wall" and "Start All Over" at the O2, the Japanese version only music video of "Who Owns My Heart", and the Miley Hearts London featurette.

== Credits and personnel ==
Credits adapted from AllMusic.

- Brooke Adams – background vocals
- Brian Bowen-Smith – photography
- Ryan Carline – engineering, keyboards, programming
- Dan Chase – keyboards, programming
- Adam Comstock – second engineering
- Dorian Crozier – drum programming
- Miley Cyrus – vocals, background vocals
- Tish Cyrus – executive producer, management
- Lars Fox – Pro-Tools
- Steve Hammons – engineering
- Ross Hogarth – engineering
- Sean Hurley – bass
- Brandon Jane – background vocals
- Enny Joo – art direction, design
- Charles Judge – keyboards
- Kevin Kadish – acoustic guitar, background vocals
- Devrim "DK" Karaoglu – producer
- Aaron Kasdorf – engineering
- Patrick Leonard – Hammond B3, piano
- Jon Lind – A&R
- Hilary Lindsey – background vocals
- Nigel Lundemo – digital editing
- Jim McGorman – piano
- Jason Morey – executive producer, management
- Akhiro Nishimura – assistant engineer
- Paul Nza – producer
- Paul Palmer – mixing
- Tim Pierce – guitar
- Marek Pompetzki – producer
- Rich Ramsey – assistant engineering
- Rock Mafia – digital editing, mixing, producer
- Jeff Rothschild – drums, engineering, mixing, programming
- Gordie Sampson – keyboards
- John Shanks – bass, guitar, keyboards, producer, background vocals
- Dave Snow – creative director
- Shari Sutcliffe – contracting, coordination, music contracting, production coordination
- Robert Vosgien – mastering

== Charts ==
=== Weekly charts ===
Chart (2010)	Peak position
Australian Albums (ARIA)	4
Austrian Albums (Ö3 Austria)	2
Belgian Albums (Ultratop Flanders)	8
Belgian Albums (Ultratop Wallonia)	7
Canadian Albums (Billboard)	2
Danish Albums (Hitlisten)	25
Dutch Albums (Album Top 100)	31
European Albums (Billboard)	2
Finnish Albums (Suomen virallinen lista)	41
French Albums (SNEP)	13
Greek Albums (IFPI)	3
Hungarian Albums (MAHASZ)	10
Irish Albums (IRMA)	5
Italian Albums (FIMI)	4
Japanese Albums (Oricon)	8
Mexican Albums (Top 100 Mexico)	10
New Zealand Albums (RMNZ)	2
Norwegian Albums (VG-lista)	8
Portuguese Albums (AFP)	1
South African Albums (RiSA)	14
South Korean Albums (Gaon)	19
Spanish Albums (Promusicae)	1
Swedish Albums (Sverigetopplistan)	21
Swiss Albums (Schweizer Hitparade)	3
UK Albums (Official Charts)	8
US Billboard 200	3

=== Year-end charts ===
Chart (2010)	Position
Austrian Albums (Ö3 Austria)	75
European Top 100 Albums (Billboard)	70
French Albums (SNEP)	172
German Albums (Offizielle Top 100)	99
Hungarian Albums (MAHASZ)	68
US Billboard 200	130

== Certifications ==
Region	Certification	Certified units/sales
Australia (ARIA)	Gold	35,000^{^}
Brazil (Pro-Música Brasil)	Platinum	40,000^{*}
New Zealand (RMNZ)	Gold	7,500^{‡}
Philippines (PARI)	Platinum	
Poland (ZPAV)	Gold	10,000^{*}
Portugal (AFP)	Gold	10,000^{^}
United Kingdom (BPI)	Silver	60,000^{^}
United States (RIAA)	Gold	500,000^{‡}
^{*} Sales figures based on certification alone.^{^} Shipments figures based on certification alone.^{‡} Sales+streaming figures based on certification alone.

== Release history ==
Release dates and formats for Can't Be Tamed
Region	Date	Formats	Versions	Label	Ref.
Germany	June 18, 2010	CD; digital download	Standard; deluxe	Universal Music	
United Kingdom	June 21, 2010	CD; digital download	Standard; deluxe	Polydor	
United States	June 21, 2010	CD; digital download	Standard; deluxe	Hollywood	
Japan	June 23, 2010	CD; digital download	Standard; deluxe	Avex	
