= Liberty Walk =

2010 song by Miley Cyrus

Song by Miley Cyrus

from the album Can't Be Tamed
- Studio: Robert Vosgien Mastering (Burbank, CA)
- Genre: Dance-pop
- Length: 4:06
- Label: Hollywood
- Songwriters: Miley Cyrus; Antonina Armato; Tim James; Nicholas J. Scapa; John Read Fasse; Michael McGinnis
- Producer: Rock Mafia

"Liberty Walk" is a song by American recording artist Miley Cyrus, from her third studio album Can't Be Tamed (2010). It was written by Cyrus, Antonina Armato, Tim James, Nicholas J. Scapa, John Read Fasse and Michael McGinnis, and produced by Armato, James and Paul Palmer under their stage-name Rock Mafia. Cyrus explained that the theme of female empowerment was a lyrical inspiration for the song. Musically, "Liberty Walk" is an uptempo dance-pop song which also contains rapped verses. Critical reception of the song was generally mixed, however, the majority of reviewers criticized the rapped verses and described the overall song as "dull". Despite not being released as a single, "Liberty Walk" peaked at number three on the U.S. Billboard Bubbling Under Hot 100 Singles chart and number 79 on the Canadian Hot 100 due to strong digital downloads.

== Background ==
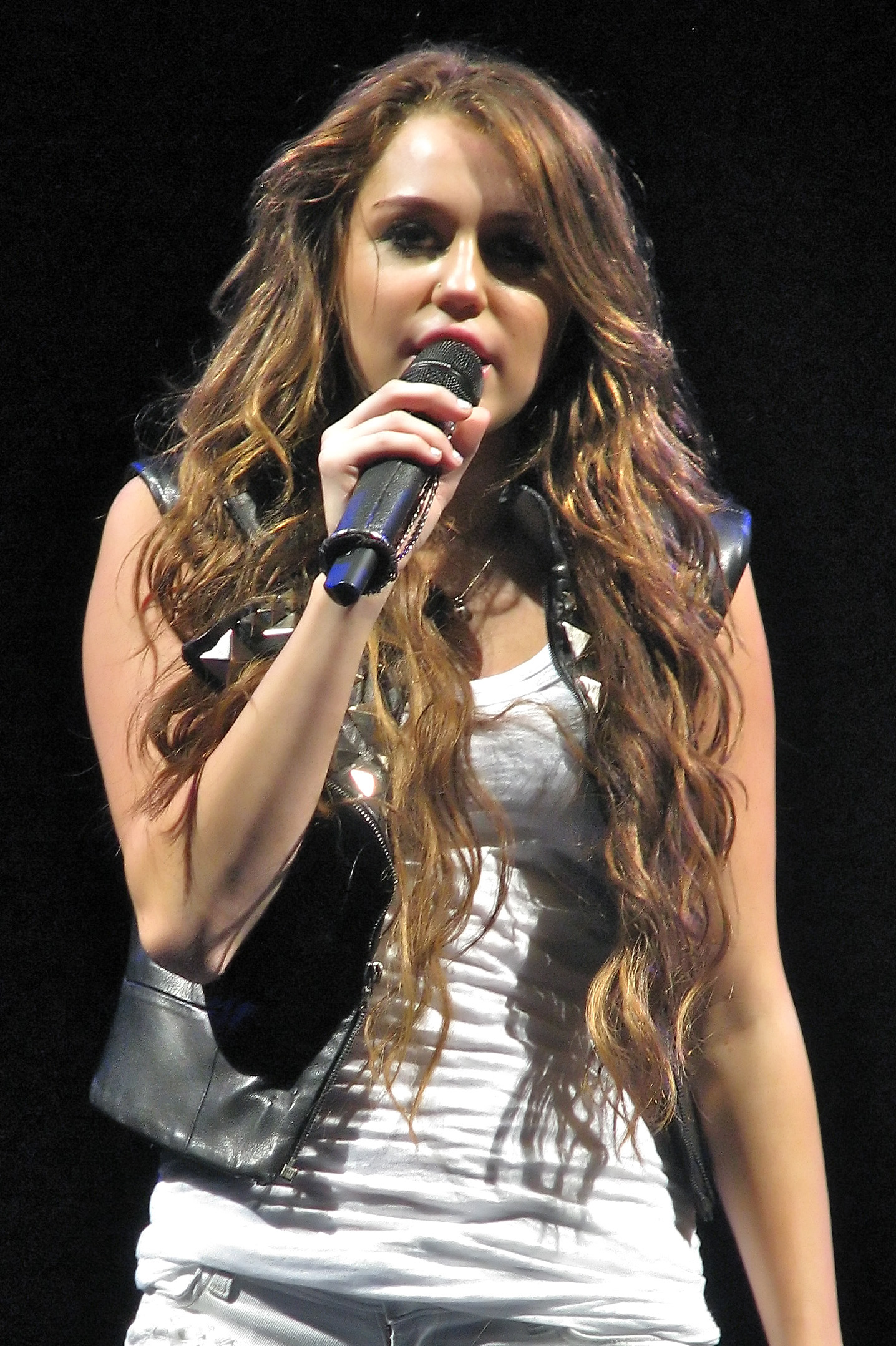
Cyrus (pictured) explained that the theme of female empowerment was inspiration for "Liberty Walk".

"Liberty Walk" was written by Cyrus, Nicholas J. Scapa, John Read Fasse, Michael McGinnis, Antonina Armato and Tim James. It was produced by the latter three under their stage name Rock Mafia. The song serves as the opening track of Can't Be Tamed (2010). In an interview with Sway Calloway for MTV News, Cyrus explained the lyrical inspiration of the song which is about female empowerment, saying: "It's just about freeing yourself from anything you think is holding you back. And I think that's really important, especially for girls, because so many people are told, 'No, you can't do something,' or, 'You need to be this because Mom and Dad say that, teachers say this.'" Upon the making of the song, Cyrus stated in the same interview that she tried to combine a serious topic with a lighter sound, explaining: "I wrote it for women that feel like they're stuck in abusive relationships, but it's a dance song". She elaborated: "So you think that must be kind of a sad ballad, but it's a party song. ... It's about breaking free."

== Composition ==
"Liberty Walk" is an uptempo dance-pop song, with a length of four minutes and six seconds. According to the digital sheet music published by Sony/ATV Music Publishing, it is written in the key of B minor and is set in common time. The beat moves at 120 beats per minute. Cyrus' vocal range in the song spans from the low note of Bb_{2} to the high note of F#_{5}. Heather Phares of Allmusic noted the use of "bold synths and beats". She also said that the "rapped verses" that Cyrus delivers sound "edgier" than the singer's previous work. Cyrus opens the song by chanting "Don’t live a lie, this is your one life". Punch Liwanag of Manila Bulletin described the song as "swanky dance" and characterised the synth sounds as "ear filling". According to Jon Caramanica of The New York Times, Cyrus applies four different vocal strategies in the song.

== Critical reception ==
"Liberty Walk" has received generally mixed reviews from music critics. Heather Phares of Allmusic commended the upbeat lyrics as being radio Disney-friendly. Similarly, Leah Greenblatt of Entertainment Weekly described the song as a "thumping album opener". A reviewer from Sputnik Music noted that "'Liberty Walk' showcases classic Miley spunk a la 'Hoedown Throwdown'". However some reviewers were critical of the song. Michelle Griffin of The Sydney Morning Herald concluded that "Liberty Walk" would "make Glee's Mr Shue blush". Glenn Gamboa of Newsday labeled it as a "loopy Jason DeRulo rip-off", and stated that "where Cyrus raps, she's hard to take seriously." Donald Gibson of Seattle Post-Intelligencer was also unfavorable of the song, who called it a "monotonous opener". Evan Sawdey of PopMatters noted that in "Liberty Walk", Cyrus' "search for a new identity renders her as anonymous and generic-sounding as ever."

== Live performances and promotional video ==
Cyrus has performed the "Liberty Walk" at the House of Blues Sunset Strip in Los Angeles, California. She also performed the song during a concert in Melbourne, Australia. According to Julia Foskey of The Hot Hits Live from LA, Cyrus wore "raunchy leather hotpants and sequined bra". She opened her concert with "Liberty Walk" at the Brisbane Entertainment Centre in Brisbane, Australia. In this performance, the singer wore "thigh-high boots, leather shorts, killer heels and a black bustier". The song has also been performed during Gypsy Heart Tour.

On November 23, 2011, Cyrus released a video which featured a remixed version of "Liberty Walk" by Rock Mafia. It features news footage of the Occupy movement that spread from Wall Street to other areas of the world. The video begins with a message saying "This is dedicated to the thousands of people who are standing up for what they believe in". Later in the video, scenes of sign-waving protesters and pepper-spraying police are shown.

== Credits and personnel ==
- Songwriting, vocals – Miley Cyrus, Antonina Armato, Tim James, Nicholas J. Scapa, John Read Fasse, Michael McGinnis
- Production – Rock Mafia
- Engineering – Steve Hammons, Adam Comstock
- Editing – Rock Mafia, Nigel Lundemo
- Mixing – Paul Palmer, Rock Mafia

Credits adapted from the liner notes of Can't Be Tamed.

== Charts ==
Due to strong digital downloads, "Liberty Walk" peaked at number three on the U.S. Billboard Bubbling Under Hot 100 Singles chart. The song also reached number 79 on the Canadian Hot 100.

Chart (2010)	Peak position
Canadian Hot 100	79
U.S. Billboard Bubbling Under Hot 100 Singles	3
