= Party in the U.S.A. =

Single by Miley Cyrus

from the EP The Time of Our Lives
- Released: August 4, 2009
- Recorded: 2009
- Studio: 3180 Media Group (Savannah, GA)
- Genre: Pop; pop rock
- Length: 3:22
- Label: Hollywood
- Songwriters: Lukasz Gottwald; Jessica Cornish; Claude Kelly
- Producer: Dr. Luke

Miley Cyrus singles chronology
"Ice Cream Freeze (Let's Chill)" (2009)	"Party in the U.S.A." (2009)	"When I Look at You" (2010)

Music video
- "Party in the U.S.A." on YouTube

"Party in the U.S.A." is a song by American singer Miley Cyrus from her first extended play (EP), The Time of Our Lives (2009). It was released on August 4, 2009, by Hollywood Records as the lead single from the project. The song was written and produced by Dr. Luke, with additional songwriting provided by Jessie J and Claude Kelly. It is a pop and pop rock song, with lyrics reflecting her relocating from Nashville, Tennessee, to Los Angeles.

"Party in the U.S.A." received widespread acclaim from music critics, many of whom praised its catchiness and Cyrus's vocals. In the United States, the song charted at number two on the Billboard Hot 100. It also reached the top ten in nine additional countries. It was the seventh best-selling digital single of 2009 in the United States. The song was certified 17× platinum by the Recording Industry Association of America (RIAA) and 4× Platinum by Music Canada. It is one of the best-selling singles of all time in the United States, where the track has sold six million in pure sales, as of July 2017. In 2020, during an appearance on Jimmy Kimmel Live!, Cyrus officially received a plaque with an RIAA Diamond certification for "Party in the U.S.A.", making it one of the few songs in history to reach this milestone. It was also certified 14× Platinum in Australia.

The music video for "Party in the U.S.A.", directed by Chris Applebaum, pays tribute to the 1978 film Grease and Cyrus's parents' courting days. It occurs mainly at a drive-in theater and won the MuchMusic Video Award for Best International Artist Video at the 2010 award show. The song was performed live for Cyrus's concert tours, the 2009 Wonder World Tour, the 2011 Gypsy Heart Tour, the 2014 Bangerz Tour, and the 2022 Attention Tour. At the 2009 Teen Choice Awards, Cyrus's use of a pole during a performance of "Party in the U.S.A.", which some interpreted to be a dance pole, caused a media uproar. Although co-writer Jessie J originally decided not to record "Party in the U.S.A." after writing it, she did eventually, among various other artists, perform a cover version of the song. "Party in the U.S.A." has also been parodied by "Weird Al" Yankovic. The song premiered on radio on July 28, 2009 before its official release. It has over 2.3 billion streams on Spotify while its music video has received over 1 billion views on YouTube, as of September 2026.

== Background ==
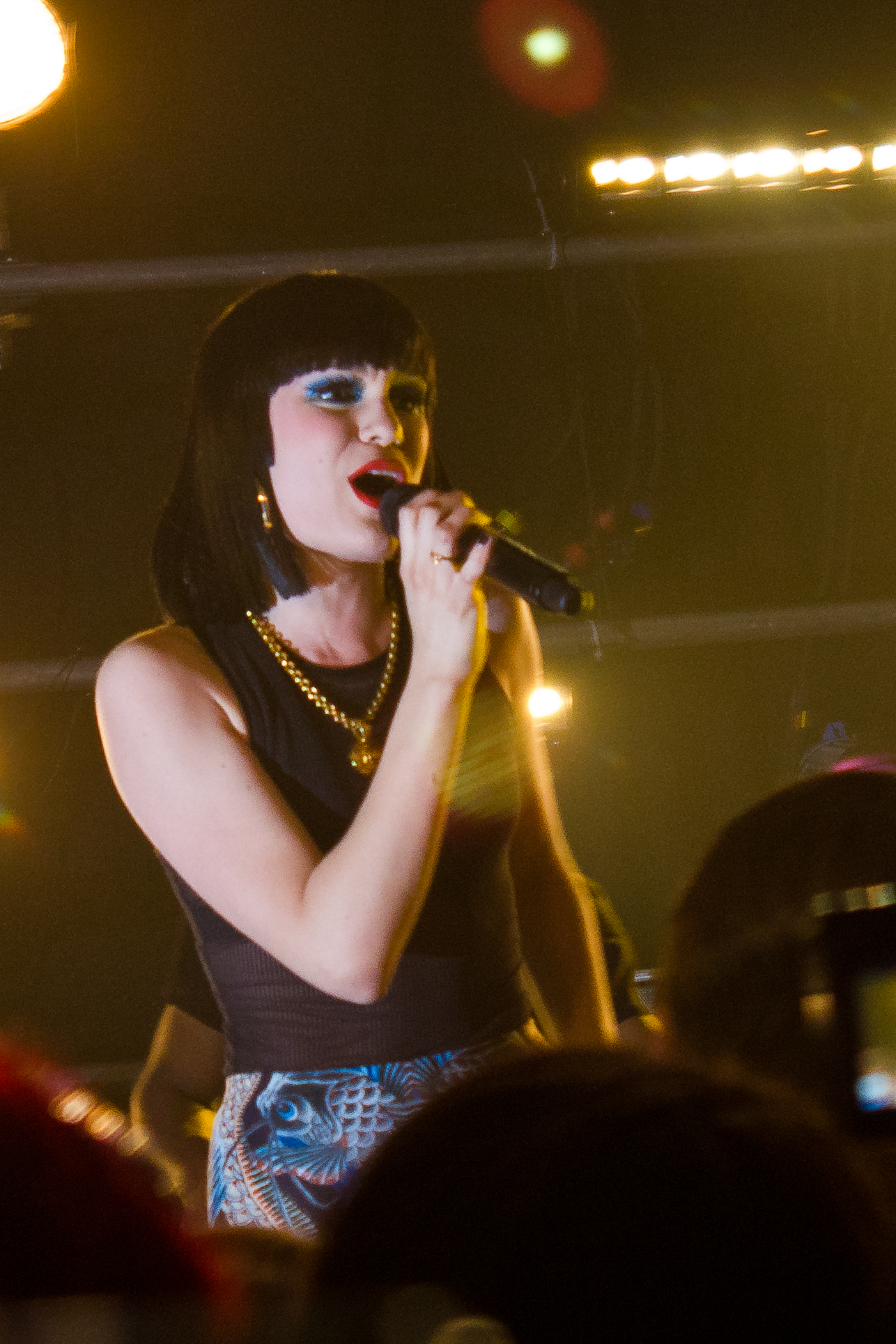
Jessie J co-wrote "Party in the U.S.A." for her debut album Who You Are, but initially decided to not record it, calling it not edgy enough for her to perform.

Soon after signing a record deal with Lava Records, aspiring British singer Jessie J commenced work on her debut album. She collaborated with songwriters and producers Dr. Luke and Claude Kelly in her first writing session, where "Party in the U.S.A." was conceived with the intention of being performed by Jessie J. However, she decided not to record the song, believing its cheerful tone was at odds with the darker, edgy material she preferred. Jessie J. stated, "And I remember thinking this song is amazing, but I don't know if it's me 110 percent, you know. You can kind of feel it." The song reached Cyrus while she was creating an EP with Dr. Luke. The writing team then reworked the lyrics, intending to write an accompanying theme for Cyrus's joint clothing line with Max Azria, exclusively sold in Walmart stores. In order to please audiences, Dr. Luke, Kelly and Jessie J fixated on composing a fun, upbeat song that narrated reflections of Cyrus's personality. "They feel they're buying into a great experience but also buying into the artist," Kelly said of the song's fans. To write his contributions to the song, Kelly said he desired to mimic Cyrus's songwriting: "It's the same song from a different point of view, you just have to find that unique perspective." To record the song's instrumentation, they decided to mingle computerized sound with "the warmth of live instrumentation", using live electric guitars and drums. Cyrus was pleased with the song and selected it partially due to a need of tracks for The Time of Our Lives. This is the first of several collaborations between Dr. Luke and Cyrus. Dr. Luke would later co-produce Cyrus's 2013 smash hit single "Wrecking Ball".

Cyrus has stated "Party in the U.S.A." is not a reflection of her musically, as she preferred songs with more of an edge. She said the track was "an all-American song" and claimed in November 2009 to have never heard a Jay-Z song, an artist referenced directly in the song's lyrics. However, she did state she enjoyed the music of Britney Spears, also mentioned in the song. "Party in the U.S.A." was chosen as the lead single from The Time of Our Lives, as Cyrus thought personnel were "picking up on it", although she did not expect for it to be commercially successful. The song was first played on radio stations on July 29, 2009, following a leak of the track on the Internet on July 28, 2009. "Party in the U.S.A." was officially released for airplay on August 3, 2009. It impacted contemporary hit radio in the United States on August 4, 2009, and was released as a digital download a week later.

== Composition ==
"Party in the U.S.A."
A 26-second sample of "Party in the U.S.A.", where the chorus is heard. The lyrics reflect Cyrus's relocating from Nashville to Hollywood.

"Party in the U.S.A." is a pop and pop rock song with a length of three minutes and twenty-three seconds, set in common time, has a moderate tempo of 96 beats per minute, and is written in the key of F♯ major and follows the chord progression F♯–A♯m–D♯m–D♯m–C♯, and Cyrus' vocals range from F♯_{3} to D♯_{5}. The song has been described as a "reggae-powered pop tune". Cyrus's vocals feature belter refrains. The song's instrumentation includes a "clash between feathery jazz guitar chords and a booming synth bassline serving as hook".

The lyrics for "Party in the U.S.A." are autobiographical; although initially about Jessie J's relocation from the United Kingdom to Los Angeles, it was rewritten to better reflect on Cyrus's relocation from Nashville, Tennessee. The song begins at Los Angeles International Airport. In the verses, the subject details her experiences in Hollywood and struggles with fitting in that make her feel homesick and intimidated. In the chorus, the subject is able to feel more confident by listening to her favourite songs. Vicki Lutas of BBC interpreted, "However cringe it sounds, your favourite song can make you feel okay and feel more confident, even if you're not really."

== Critical reception ==
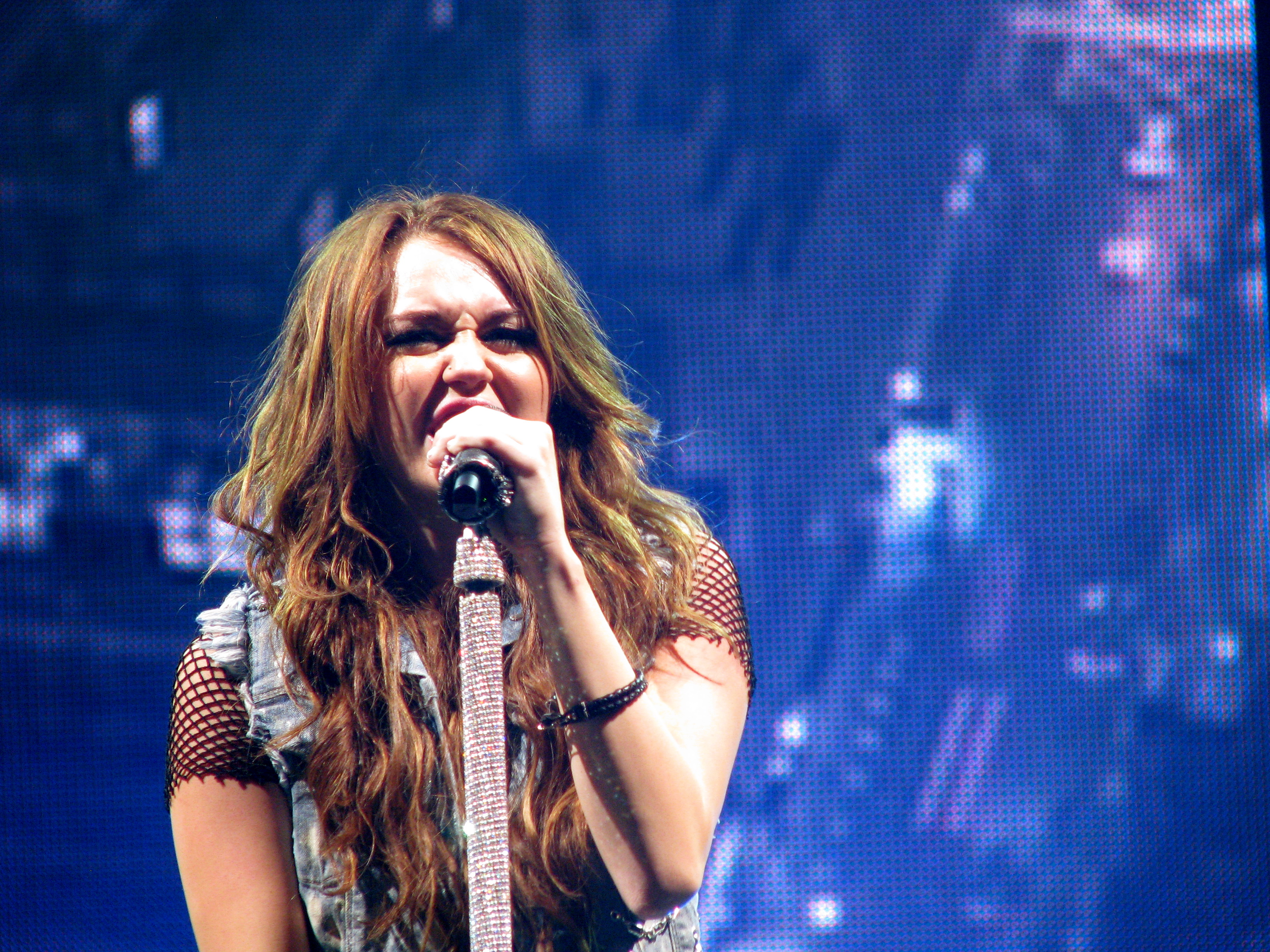
Cyrus performing "Party in the U.S.A." on her Wonder World Tour

"Party in the U.S.A." received critical acclaim. Michael Hann of The Guardian stated that "Party in the U.S.A." was a cute pop song. Later, while reviewing Cyrus's Wonder World Tour, he elaborated the song was a reminder "that manufactured pop need not be a bad thing – if the manufacturing is good enough". Jaime Gill of Yahoo! Music wrote, "Fortunately for Cyrus, [the other songs from The Time of Our Lives] flee your brain cells within seconds of their final chords, which means you're more likely to remember the breezily brilliant hit 'Party in the U.S.A.'" Mikael Wood of New York City's Time Out magazine described the song as a "killer tune [...] which proves that Miley makes for a much better rapper than you might expect". Heather Phares of AllMusic selected the track as one of the EPs best, describing it as a frothy party anthem suitable for Cyrus's alias, Hannah Montana.

Erik Ernst of The Milwaukee Journal Sentinel called the song "ridiculously catchy". Mikael Wood of Entertainment Weekly decided that "Party in the U.S.A." was Cyrus's bouncy attempt at urban music, since she had previously transitioned into other markets. Jessica Holland of The Observer deemed "Party in the U.S.A." one of the highlights on The Time of Our Lives. Michael Menachem of Billboard stated the song was one of Cyrus's most entertaining songs. Menachem continued, "[Dr. Luke] injects the song with an energy recalling Robyn and early Gwen Stefani. After successfully tackling dance and country formats and delivering one of the year's strongest ballads ('The Climb'), Cyrus continues to show off her impressive range." Ryan Brockington of the New York Post said that although the track was more mainstream than Cyrus's previous singles, he did not dislike it. Vicki Lutas of BCC described "Party in the U.S.A." as "a breath of fresh air" while being "seriously stomping" and slightly relatable. She said the song's best attribute was Cyrus's voice and concluded that Cyrus contains an ability of making her voice sound interesting all the time. Upon listening to the track, Lutas feels that "suddenly you think someone else is in the room with you and you've got all the ingredients for, well, a huge party contained in one little song."

== Commercial performance ==
"Party in the U.S.A." debuted and peaked at number two on the Billboard Hot 100 on the week ending August 29, 2009, due to the sale of over 226,000 digital downloads, thus becoming the fastest-selling single released by Hollywood Records. Despite being kept from number one for three non-consecutive weeks, behind "I Gotta Feeling" by the Black Eyed Peas and "Down" by Jay Sean featuring Lil Wayne, respectively, "Party in the U.S.A." became Cyrus's best charting effort at the time, surpassing her previous best single "The Climb", which peaked at number four in May 2009. The week's appearance also marked the highest debut by a female solo artist since Carrie Underwood's "Inside Your Heaven", which debuted at number one in July 2005. In the succeeding weeks, "Party in the U.S.A." continued to sell and stayed on the Billboard Hot 100, spending 28 weeks in total. It also peaked at number one on Mainstream Top 40 and number 13 on Adult Top 40. According to Billboard, "Party in the U.S.A." was the seventh-best selling digital single of 2009 in the US. The single was certified 17× platinum by the Recording Industry Association of America (RIAA), marking Hollywood Records's best-selling single to date and the highest certified non-holiday song by a female artist in the US. By October 2012, "Party in the U.S.A" had surpassed 5 million sales in the United States, making Cyrus the youngest artist to have a single that sold more than five million downloads. As of July 2017, the song had sold 5,981,000 downloads in the US.

"Party in the U.S.A." peaked at number three on the Canadian Hot 100. The single was certified 4× platinum by the Music Canada for the sales of 160,000 digital downloads. The song also became successful in Australia, New Zealand and Japan. On the week ending September 13, 2009, "Party in the U.S.A." debuted at number 14 on the Australian Singles Chart. The following week, the song ascended to a new peak at number nine and peaked at number six on the week ending November 8, 2009. The single was certified 14× platinum by the Australian Recording Industry Association (ARIA). "Party in the U.S.A." debuted at number 11 on the New Zealand Singles Chart and peaked at number three on the week ending November 9, 2009. The single was certified 9× platinum by Recorded Music NZ (RMNZ) for sales of 270,000 equivalent units. On the week ending January 11, 2010, "Party in the U.S.A." debuted at number 49 on the Japan Hot 100 chart and, in the succeeding week, reached its peak at number four.

In the United Kingdom, "Party in the U.S.A." entered and peaked at number 11. The song tied with "See You Again" and "The Climb", which charted in August 2008 and March 2009, respectively, for Cyrus's best-charting effort in the United Kingdom until 2013. In Ireland, the song peaked at number five. In mainland Europe, "Party in the U.S.A." peaked at number 17 on the European Hot 100 Singles chart, number six on both the French Singles Chart and Hungarian Singles Chart, becoming her first top ten in these national charts and Cyrus second entry in France, but also peaked at number 12 on Norwegian Singles Chart. It received lower commercial success throughout other regions of Europe, becoming a top 40 hit in Austria, Belgium (Flanders and Wallonia), Czech Republic, Denmark, Spain, and Sweden.

== Music video ==
The scene from Grease where Travolta sings "Sandy" (top) triggered the conception for the music video for "Party in the U.S.A." (bottom).

Cyrus contacted Chris Applebaum to direct the accompanying music video for "Party in the U.S.A.", with ideas for the video already conceived. Her ideas for the video's theme were about "high-gloss, glamorous white trash." She told Applebaum she desired to pay homage to one of her favorite movies, Grease (1978), and her parents' courting days. Video conception sprang forward with the idea to resemble the scene in Grease where John Travolta sings "Sandy". In the scene, Travolta exits from a car and walks over to a jungle gym, where he sits on a swing and performs the song as projections are displayed in the background. To render tribute to her parents' courting days, Cyrus and Applebaum named a drive-in theater in the video Corral Drive-In after a Kentucky drive-in where Cyrus's parents had a date. "In addition, Miley's mom Tish used to drive '79 black Pontiac Trans Am, Smokey and the Bandit style, and obviously that's the car that Miley arrives in," Applebaum said.

The video commences by showing a drive-in theater in the day. Cyrus later arrives in a black 1979 Pontiac Trans Am, clothed by a black tank top, distressed hot pants, cowboy boots and a black vest. Cyrus and several female extras make their way to a blue pick-up truck, where Cyrus sings using a digital microphone and the extras accompany her. In the song's second verse, Cyrus lies against a wall depicting the drive-in's name, "Corral Drive-In". Then, an American flag with 33 stars and 8 stripes unfurls before a freestanding wall in a vacant landscape, where she sings into a microphone as glitter confetti drops from above. Later, she, standing on a swing in the center, and several backup dancers appear in a jungle gym during the evening. For the song's final refrain, Cyrus performs with four backup dancers on a stage, where the background plays the American flag and letters above it that spell "USA". Cut-scenes feature people entering the drive-in theater, Cyrus walking throughout the drive-in alone, or her and the backup dancers performing in the jungle gym. The video ends with Cyrus whipping her hair in the stage setting.

A 90-second snippet was shown on September 23, 2009, on Dancing with the Stars. Subsequently, that day, the video premiered online on ABC's Music Lounge. Jocelyn Vena of MTV said, "The video is reminiscent of Cyrus' performance of the track on the Teen Choice Awards over the summer — minus the pole dancing." According to a survey held by MTV, responses for the music video varied from populations who were "not feeling it" for various reasons to those who enjoyed "the video's energy and thought that the added bit of sexiness was a healthy progression for Cyrus." On September 25, 2009, the video was released to YouTube via Hollywood Records' Vevo channel; it has over 1 billion views, as of July 2024. At the Canadian 2010 MuchMusic Video Awards, which Cyrus hosted, the video won the MuchMusic Video Award for Best International Artist Video and was nominated for the MuchMusic Video Award for People's Choice: Favourite International Video, but lost to Adam Lambert's video for "Whataya Want from Me".

== Live performances ==
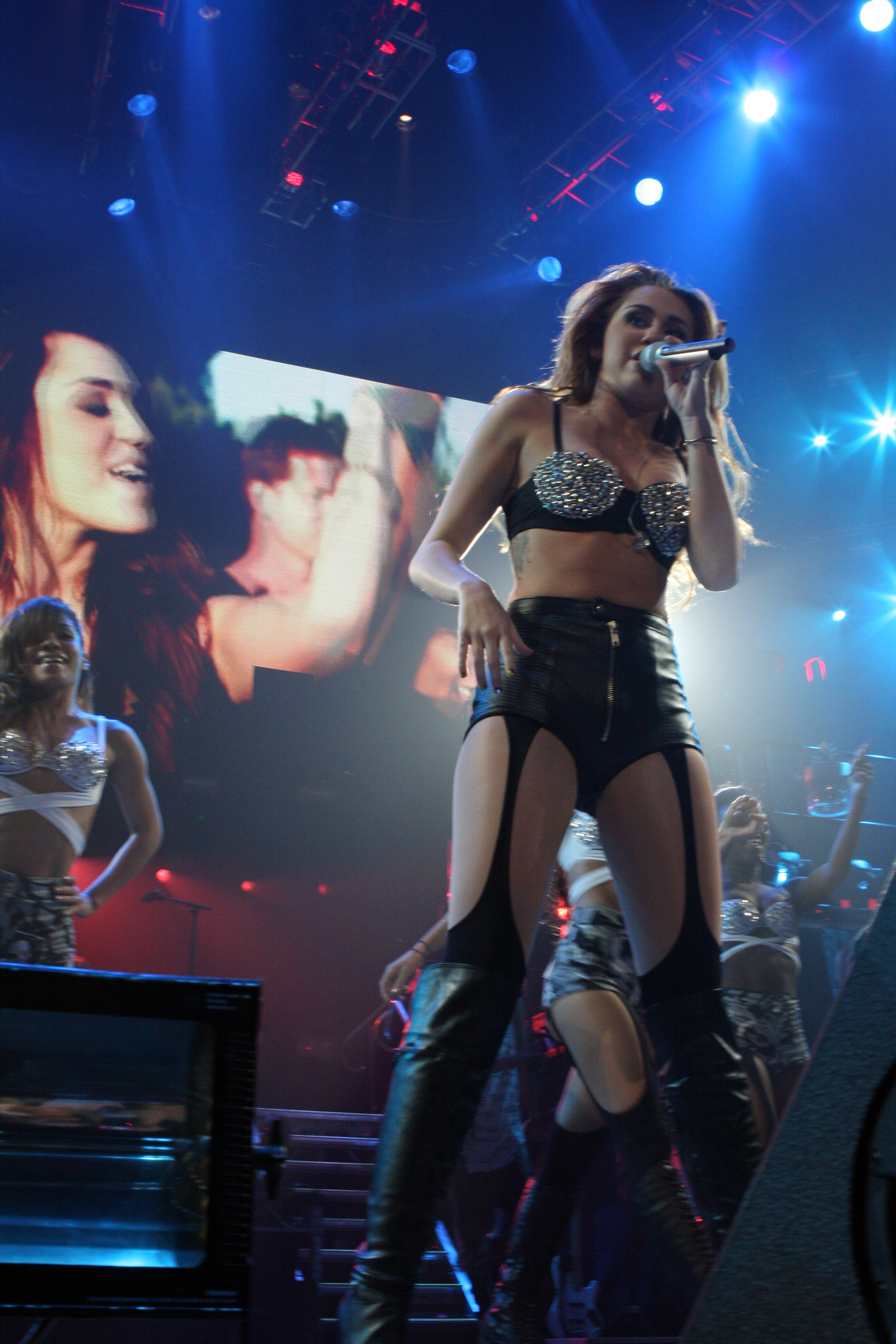
Cyrus performing "Party in the U.S.A." on her Gypsy Heart Tour

Cyrus's first live performance of "Party in the U.S.A." at the Teen Choice Awards held on August 9, 2009. Wearing a tank top, black pants, and leather boots, Cyrus and backup dancers appeared from a trailer. Midway through the performance, Cyrus danced atop an ice cream pushcart with a pole (which was suggested to be a dance pole by numerous critics) for approximately forty seconds. Cyrus described the performance to be about her heritage: "[My] performance tonight is funny, but I wanted it to be about [something more]. I'm like, 'This is to represent where I am from. I'm so proud of it.' All the girls trying to be Hollywood and stuff with their big glasses, me shooing them away." The performance was met with a media uproar in regards to her dancing being too suggestive and sexual for a teen-oriented event, which caused Disney to issue a statement distancing themselves from the performance. Ian Drew, senior editor of Us Weekly said, "She already has this risque image, so it really wasn't much of a stretch. That's how Britney [Spears] took off. She was the good girl gone bad, and it looks to be working for Miley as well." Other contemporary critics used negative comparisons to Spears, but Cyrus welcomed the comparisons via a post on her official Twitter account. Child psychologist Wendi Fischer told Newsday: Cyrus was communicating to her fans that it is acceptable to pole dance, which, according to Fischer, was unacceptable. "Miley's only 16. Why is she rushing it?", she concluded. Other critics defended Cyrus. Apryl Duncan of About.com said viewers should have fixated on her accomplishments that night, winning six awards, rather than the sexuality of the performance. Following the controversy of the performance, Cyrus replaced the ice cream pushcart with a luggage cart while touring.

In 2009, Cyrus continued promotion for the single and The Time of Our Lives, performing "Party in the U.S.A." on NBC's Today and VH1 Divas in the United States. In the winter, she promoted the track in the United Kingdom at 95.8 Capital FM's Jingle Bell Ball, the annual gala for British royal family, Royal Variety Performance, and Alan Carr: Chatty Man, as well as in Ireland on The Late Late Show. Cyrus performed the song on all venues of her first world concert tour, the Wonder World Tour, which extended from September to December 2009. During each performance, Cyrus was clothed by a black tank top, black hot pants, black leather boots and a denim vest as images on the overhead screens depicted an abundance of sites in and representations of the United States. She roamed throughout the stage with several backup dancers and, mid-performance, entered a luggage cart that escorted her throughout the stage again. The lyrics' reference to Jay-Z was replaced with one for Michael Jackson in all live performances. Mikael Wood of The Los Angeles Times, who attended the September 22, 2009, concert at the Staples Center in Los Angeles, believed "Cyrus managed a reasonable approximation of a rapper" in the performance. Dave Paulson of The Tennessean reported that the song's performance at the November 25, 2009, concert at the Sommet Center in Nashville, Tennessee, "received cheers at Jonas Brothers–worthy decibel levels."

In 2010, while promoting her Can't Be Tamed album, Cyrus performed "Party in the U.S.A." at Rock in Rio concerts in Lisbon, Portugal, and Madrid, Spain, the 1515 Club in Paris, France, G-A-Y club in London, Good Morning America, 2010 MuchMusic Video Awards, in Toronto, Ontario. and a concert at the House of Blues in Los Angeles, which was streamed across over 30 websites owned by MTV Networks. In 2011, she performed the song in her second and third world concert tours, the Gypsy Heart Tour

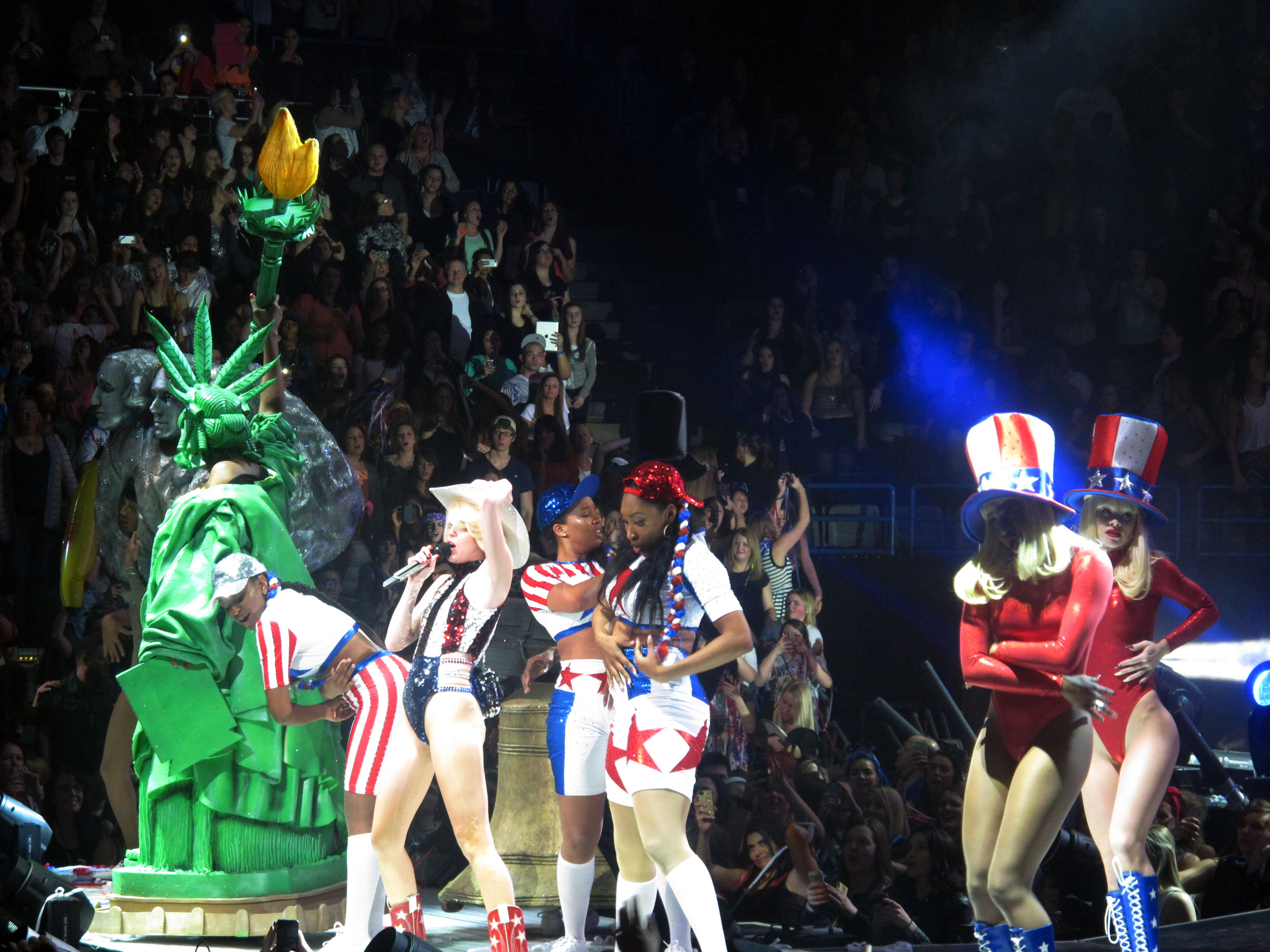
Cyrus performing "Party in the U.S.A." on her Bangerz Tour, along with various American references, including Mount Rushmore, the Statue of Liberty and the Liberty Bell

In 2013, Cyrus sang "Party in the U.S.A." during her performances held to promote Bangerz album. She performed the single on Jimmy Kimmel Live!, 2013 iHeartRadio Music Festival in Las Vegas, Today, and the series of Jingle Ball concerts in December (including Jingle Bell Ball in Los Angeles). In 2014 she included this song on her Bangerz Tour. While singing "Party in the U.S.A.", Cyrus has shorter blonde hair, a leotard with red, white, and blue sequins, a white cowboy hat, star-spangled boots, and a set of fake teeth during the performance. The backup dancers were dressed as American monuments. Her performance received positive reviews from critics. Théoden Janes of The Charlotte Observer wrote, "She turned a verse of Party in the U.S.A. into a cool, cocky rap" and John J. Moser of The Morning Call said that the performance resonated with the audience, even though Cyrus was lifted atop a huge pedestal. Jane Stevenson of the Toronto Sun wrote, "She went for a big ending, with fireworks, confetti, an elevating stage and dancers dressed as Abe Lincoln, Mount Rushmore, the Liberty Bell and The Statue of Liberty for the final older song Party in the U.S.A." A critic from Nashville Scene wrote, "Party in the U.S.A. was sung by Miley and screamed back by the people in the crowd. Cue red-white-and-blue confetti. Cue fireworks. Pack the Bangerz Tour up and put the circus back on the road. Fans in other cities need to party, too." Cyrus also performed the song during the musical festival on June 21, 2014, Summertime Ball at Wembley Stadium of London, in front of 80,000 people.

In honor of Pride Month, Cyrus performed "Party in the U.S.A" at the Capital Pride in Washington, D.C. on June 11, 2017. On September 15, she performed the song for the BBC Radio 1 Live Lounge, accompanied with other songs like "Malibu", "See You Again", "Younger Now" and a cover of Roberta Flack's "The First Time Ever I Saw Your Face".

Cyrus again performed the "Party In the U.S.A." along with "Edge of Midnight" and "Prisoner" on Dick Clark's New Year's Rockin' Eve with Ryan Seacrest in Times Square on December 31, 2020.

== Cover versions ==
In Season 6, Episode 15 of The Office, "Sabre", Andy Bernard and Erin Hannon perform a parody of "Party in the U.S.A.", titled "Dunder Mifflin Is a Part of Sabre", for the new sales director of Sabre, Gabe Lewis. The parody song is about Scranton, Pennsylvania, the setting of the series, and Gabe's arrival. However, Andy and Erin mispronounce "Sabre" as SAHB-ray (the correct pronunciation is SAY-bər). Kelly West of Cinema Blend wrote, "Still, it was adorable seeing the two sing together. Unfortunately, the rhythm of their flirtation is just as awkward (and equally charming) as the rhythm of the song they attempted to perform."

On the May 26, 2011, episode of talk show Late Night with Jimmy Fallon, "Party in the U.S.A." was covered in the style of Crosby, Stills, Nash & Young, a recurrent bit on the show. Host Jimmy Fallon sang lead (impersonating Neil Young), while playing an acoustic guitar and harmonica. Crosby, Stills, Nash & Young members David Crosby and Graham Nash joined to Fallon with vocal harmonies. Matthew Perpetua of Rolling Stone described it as "a sad, beautifully harmonized folk rendition of Miley Cyrus's 'Party in the U.S.A.' that manage[d] to make the joyful tween anthem sound like a vintage Sixties protest song."

A cover of the song was made by Kidz Bop Kids. They made a redo version in 2021.

A parody titled "Party in the CIA" was included on "Weird Al" Yankovic's 13th studio album, Alpocalypse (2011). This parody excluded the final chorus, thus only repeating once after the bridge.

Prior to the 2012 Summer Olympics, the United States women's national soccer team made a video of the players lip synching to the song; the video became very popular.

In 2016, a rendition of "Party in the U.S.A", covered by Alana D, was featured in The Purge: Election Year.

Party in the U.S.A. was included in the Album Now That's What I Call A Decade! 2000s, but the line Yeah it's a party in the USA at the end of the song repeats four times instead of two.

== Impact and legacy ==
The Song often sees a resurgence during major American events leading to it being dubbed "The Unofficial National Anthem."

"Party in the U.S.A." resurged in popularity in the wake of the killing of Osama bin Laden on May 2, 2011. The song's official YouTube video was flooded with comments regarding the killing of bin Laden and it was immediately deemed a celebratory anthem for the event. The track's association to his death continued on other social media, such as Facebook and Twitter, and it was played as individuals celebrated outside of the White House. Of the song becoming an anthem for bin Laden's death, Nitsuh Abebe of New York magazine wrote, "I have to confess that my list of reactions to the news did not get anywhere near 'watch a Miley Cyrus video.' The reason it occurred to others is surely as simple as it seems: This is a recent hit song whose title is dominated by the words 'party' and 'U.S.A.' Looking for anything more apt would be overthinking it. Cyrus' video... is stocked with a great many of those things we like and do well: a drive-in theater, trucks and muscle cars, Daisy Dukes, giant flags. It is, just like bin Laden's death, another convenient opportunity to celebrate ourselves."

Following the 2020 United States presidential election, as major news outlets announced Democratic nominee Joe Biden the winner of the presidential race, on November 7, 2020, supporters in New York City began singing "Party in the U.S.A." at Times Square. This caused the song to re-enter the charts, breaking through the iTunes Top 200. Cyrus also tweeted a video in celebration of Biden's win, writing "Now THIS is a PARTY IN THE USA!", where she made a short clip combining Party in the USA with Wrecking Ball, with the background music being the second to last line in the song.

== Track listings ==
Digital download

1. "Party in the U.S.A." – 3:22

Digital download (extended play)

1. "Party in the U.S.A." – 3:22
2. "Party in the U.S.A." (Wideboys full club) – 5:24
3. "Party in the U.S.A." (Cahill club mix) – 5:45

CD and digital download

1. "Party in the U.S.A." – 3:22
2. "Party in the U.S.A." (Wideboys full club) – 5:24

7" vinyl single

1. "Party in the U.S.A." – 3:22
2. "The Time of Our Lives" – 3:32

== Charts ==
=== Weekly charts ===
Weekly chart performance
Chart (2009–2026)	Peak position
Australia (ARIA)	6
Austria (Ö3 Austria Top 40)	30
Belgium (Ultratop 50 Flanders)	39
Belgium (Ultratop 50 Wallonia)	18
Canada Hot 100 (Billboard)	3
Canada AC (Billboard)	33
Canada CHR/Top 40 (Billboard)	3
Canada Hot AC (Billboard)	4
Denmark (Tracklisten)	23
European Hot 100 Singles (Billboard)	17
France (SNEP)	6
Global 200 (Billboard)	71
Hungary (Rádiós Top 40)	11
Hungary (Single Top 40)	6
Ireland (IRMA)	5
Italy (FIMI)	40
Japan (Japan Hot 100)	4
Mexico Anglo (Monitor Latino)	10
Netherlands (Dutch Top 40 Tipparade)	9
New Zealand (Recorded Music NZ)	3
Norway (VG-lista)	12
Scottish Singles Sales (Official Charts)	9
South Korea Foreign (Circle)	38
Spain (Promusicae)	32
Sweden (Sverigetopplistan)	22
Switzerland (Schweizer Hitparade)	41
UK Singles (Official Charts)	11
US Billboard Hot 100	2
US Adult Pop Airplay (Billboard)	13
US Dance Airplay (Billboard)	9
US Pop Airplay (Billboard)	1
US Rhythmic Airplay (Billboard)	28

=== Year-end charts ===
2009 year-end chart performance
Chart (2009)	Position
Australia (ARIA)	37
Brazil (Crowley)	99
Canada (Canadian Hot 100)	33
Hungary (Rádiós Top 40)	124
New Zealand (RIANZ)	17
UK Singles (OCC)	154
US Billboard Hot 100	29
US Mainstream Top 40 (Billboard)	25

2010 year-end chart performance
Chart (2010)	Position
Australia (ARIA)	95
Belgium (Ultratop 50 Wallonia)	97
Canada (Canadian Hot 100)	75
European Hot 100 Singles (Billboard)	78
France (SNEP)	49
Hungary (Rádiós Top 40)	59
Japan Adult Contemporary (Billboard)	66
US Billboard Hot 100	67

2022 year-end chart performance
Chart (2022)	Position
Australia (ARIA)	83

2023 year-end chart performance
Chart (2023)	Position
Australia (ARIA)	69

== Certifications and sales ==
Certifications and sales
Region	Certification	Certified units/sales
Australia (ARIA)	14× Platinum	980,000^{‡}
Brazil (Pro-Música Brasil)	2× Platinum	120,000^{‡}
Canada (Music Canada)	4× Platinum	160,000^{*}
Denmark (IFPI Danmark)	2× Platinum	180,000^{‡}
Germany (BVMI)	Platinum	300,000^{‡}
Italy (FIMI)	Platinum	100,000^{‡}
Japan (RIAJ) Digital single	Gold	100,000^{*}
New Zealand (RMNZ)	10× Platinum	300,000^{‡}
Norway (IFPI Norway)	3× Platinum	180,000^{‡}
South Korea (Gaon)	—	85,235
Spain (Promusicae)	Platinum	60,000^{‡}
United Kingdom (BPI)	4× Platinum	2,400,000^{‡}
United States (RIAA)	17× Platinum	17,000,000^{‡}
^{*} Sales figures based on certification alone.^{‡} Sales+streaming figures based on certification alone.

== Release history ==
Release dates and formats
Region	Date	Format	Version(s)	Label	Ref.
United States	August 4, 2009	Contemporary hit radio	Original	Hollywood	
Various	August 11, 2009	Digital download	Original	Hollywood	
Various	October 12, 2009	Digital download	Wideboys full club; Cahill club mix	Hollywood	
United Kingdom	October 26, 2009	CD	Original; Wideboys full club	Polydor	
United States	June 22, 2026	7" vinyl	Original; The Time Of Our Lives	Hollywood	

== See also ==
- List of best-selling singles
- List of best-selling singles in Australia
- List of best-selling singles in the United States
- List of Billboard Hot 100 top-ten singles in 2009
- List of Billboard Mainstream Top 40 number-one songs of 2009
