= Hannah Montana Forever (soundtrack) =

2010 soundtrack album by Miley Cyrus

Soundtrack album by Hannah Montana
- Released: October 15, 2010
- Recorded: 2008–2010
- Genres: Pop; teen pop; pop rock; power pop; dance-pop; country pop
- Length: 36:28
- Label: Walt Disney
- Producers: Mitch Allan; Adam Anders; Toby Gad; Jakob Hazell; Jamie Houston; Miley Cyrus; Jeannie Lurie; Aris Archontis; Chen Neeman; Twin; Alke; Fishman

Miley Cyrus chronology
Can't Be Tamed (2010)	Hannah Montana Forever (2010)	Bangerz (2013)

Singles from Hannah Montana Forever
- 1. "Ordinary Girl" Released: July 6, 2010; 2. "Are You Ready" Released: September 3, 2010; 3. "Gonna Get This" Released: October 5, 2010; 4. "I'm Still Good" Released: December 10, 2010

Hannah Montana Forever is the soundtrack album for the fourth and final season of the television series Hannah Montana, released on October 15, 2010, by Walt Disney Records. All eleven tracks are performed by its primary actress Miley Cyrus, and are credited to her character Hannah Montana. Recording artists Billy Ray Cyrus, Iyaz, and Sheryl Crow appear as featured vocalists. The soundtrack is primarily a pop record, which sees additional influences from teen pop, pop rock, power pop, dance-pop, and country pop musical styles.

== Background and composition ==
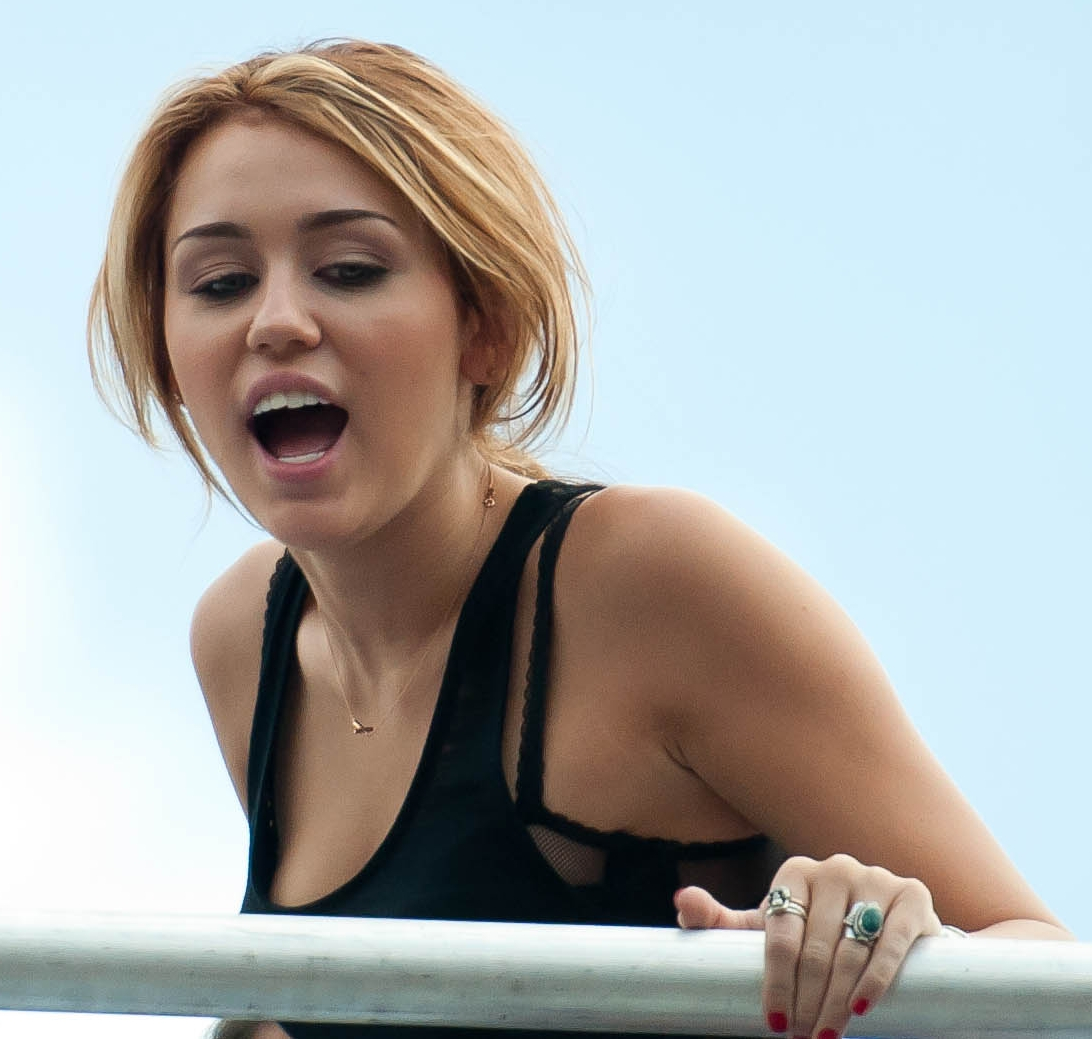
Miley Cyrus (pictured in 2010) portrayed the title character on the television series Hannah Montana.

The opening track "Gonna Get This", a duet with British Virgin Islander Iyaz, was written by Niclas Molinder, Joacim Persson, Johan Alkenas, and Drew Ryan Scott. Iyaz claimed he listened to Cyrus' music very often and that Hannah Montana was among his favorite television series with others from Disney Channel. "I've been watching the show for a very long time, and finally got the opportunity to do a song with Miley", he said. "Gonna Get This" was recorded in April 2010 rapidly, according to Iyaz, because of his appearance on an episode of Hannah Montana. At first, he arrived to the studio not knowing what to expect and became hesitant but in the end could not believe they "pulled it off". Iyaz described "Gonna Get This" as a track with an edge, claiming Cyrus added her usual signature style while he put an "island twist" on it. The track leaked onto the Internet in July 2010, entitled "This Boy, That Girl".

Toby Gad contributed to the soundtrack by co-writing "Ordinary Girl", "Que Será", and "Are You Ready". "Are You Ready" was written by Gad, BC Jean, and Lyrica Anderson. The song was recorded for Hannah Montana 3 and leaked on the Internet in November 2008, along with tracks from Hannah Montana 3, yet, was not included in the soundtrack. A duet with Sheryl Crow, guest star on the episode "It's the End of Jake as We Know It", titled "Need a Little Love" was solely penned by Jaime Houston. "Love That Lets Go" is a duet with Cyrus' father Billy Ray Cyrus (who also portrays Miley's father, Robbie Ray Stewart, on Hannah Montana) and was composed by Adam Anders and Nikki Hassman. "I'm Still Good" and "Been Here All Along" were written by Jennie Lurie, Aris Archontis, and Chen Neeman.

According to Walt Disney Records, Hannah Montana Forever covers much musical ground, from intimate ballads to direct high-voltage pop. "Gonna Get This" is heavy on synthesizers and Caribbean-based melodies. Musically, the ballad "Ordinary Girl" is a pop song characterized by its mature vocals and percussion-driven instrumentation. Lyrically, "Ordinary Girl" attempts to convince audiences that, despite the fame, she is just an everyday person. "Kiss It Goodbye" is an upbeat dance-pop, pop rock number and "I'll Always Remember You" lyrically speaks about the sentiments that occur after a wistful farewell. "Need a Little Love" is rich in pop harmonies. "Are You Ready"'s upbeat sound was inspired by club music. The ballad "Love That Lets Go" is a tribute to Cyrus' and her father's, who duets in the track, close relationship, both on screen and off. "I'm Still Good", an uptempo track with pop rock characteristics in its musical composition, and "Been Here All Along", a ballad about loving someone separated by distance, follow. The closing track on Hannah Montana Forever, "Barefoot Cinderella" was described as an explosion of pop music by Walt Disney Records.

== Promotion ==
"Ordinary Girl" was released on July 6, 2010, as the lead single of the soundtrack to digital platforms, and September 15, 2010, as a physical single in European territories. The song peaked at number ninety-one on the Billboard Hot 100. "Are You Ready" was released digitally as the second single in European territories on September 3, 2010. "Gonna Get This", with R&B singer Iyaz was released digitally as the third single in the United States and Canada on October 5, 2010. The song peaked at number sixty-six on the Billboard Hot 100. "I'm Still Good" was released as the fourth and final single digitally and physically in European territories on December 10, 2010.

"Ordinary Girl" and "Are You Ready" were the first two songs to premiere on Radio Disney, premiering on July 1, 2010, and July 2, 2010, respectively. Later on, "I'm Still Good" and "Que Sera" received premieres on August 13, 2010, and September 3, 2010. The former was given a promotional music video, taken from a performance from the episode "Been Here All Along". "Que Sera" received a music video that features a body double of Miley Cyrus at a recording studio, while images rapidly show to portray the sequence of a teenage male attempting to redeem a relationship with a teenage female. The song "Gonna Get This" premiered on Radio Disney and the video on Disney Channel on September 24, 2010. Hannah Montana Forever had its broadcast debut on October 16 with a rebroadcast on the two following days.

== Reception ==
Professional ratings
Review scores
Source	Rating
AllMusic	2.5/5 stars
Common Sense Media	4/5 stars
Entertainment Weekly	B+

Hannah Montana Forever received generally mixed reviews from music critics. Heather Phares of AllMusic gave the album 2.5 out of 5 stars, and said it "proves that everyone involved with Hannah was ready to move on." Entertainment Weekly was more gracious, awarding the album a B+ and saying, "Miley Cyrus struck out with this summer's whiny Can't Be Tamed, but she's in finer form on Hannah Montana Forever, the soundtrack to her TV show's final season. Credit the would-be film star's relief at finally hanging up Hannah's blond wig; there's no mistaking the glee with which she sings 'I'm free as a bird' on 'Que Sera'. Even 'Love That Lets Go', an acoustic duet with her dad Billy Ray, feels more sweet than sappy." They also stated that "I'm Still Good" and "Need a Little Love" were the best songs. Common Sense Media gave the album 4 out of 5 stars, commenting, "The music from the Hannah Montana Forever Soundtrack is a nice mix of pop-rock, synth beats, and sweet ballads that Hannah Montana is known for, as well as a satisfying wrap to four seasons of fun, friends, family, and music."

Hannah Montana Forever debuted at no. 11 on the Billboard 200. This is an all-time low for the artist, as no previous album of new material released by Cyrus has failed to reach the top ten. It also the first album in the Hannah Montana franchise to miss the top ten since 2008's Walmart exclusive Hannah Montana Hits Remixed. First week sales for the album were projected to be around 28,000, which is over 109,000 less than the previous year's Hannah Montana 3. It was certified Gold by the Recording Industry Association of America on August 4, 2023.

== Track listing ==
Hannah Montana Forever – Standard edition
No.	Title	Writer(s)	Producer(s)	Length
1.	"Gonna Get This" (featuring Iyaz)	Niclas Molinder; Joacim Persson; Johan Alkenäs; Drew Ryan Scott	Twin; Alke	3:16
2.	"Que Sera"	Toby Gad; BC Jean; Denise Rich; Ray Evans; Jay Livingston	Gad	2:59
3.	"Ordinary Girl"	Gad; Arama Brown	Gad	2:57
4.	"Kiss It Goodbye"	Molinder; Persson; Jakob Hazell; Charlie Masson; Christoffer Wikberg	Fishman; Hazell	2:45
5.	"I'll Always Remember You"	Mitch Allan; Jessi Alexander	Allan	3:53
6.	"Need a Little Love" (featuring Sheryl Crow)	Jamie Houston	Houston	3:55
7.	"Are You Ready"	Gad; Jean; Lyrica Anderson	Gad	3:16
8.	"Love That Lets Go" (featuring Billy Ray Cyrus)	Adam Anders; Nikki Hassman	Anders	3:06
9.	"I'm Still Good"	Jeannie Lurie; Aris Archontis; Chen Neeman	Lurie; Archontis; Neeman	3:17
10.	"Been Here All Along"	Lurie; Archontis; Neeman	Lurie; Archontis; Neeman	4:01
11.	"Barefoot Cinderella"	Houston; James Dean Hicks	Houston	2:56
Total length:				36:21

Hannah Montana Forever – iTunes Store edition (bonus track)
No.	Title	Writer(s)	Producer(s)	Length
12.	"Wherever I Go"	Adam Watts; Andy Dodd; HitmanKTI	Watts; Dodd; HitmanKTI	3:31
Total length:				39:52

Hannah Montana Forever – International iTunes Store edition (bonus track)
No.	Title	Writer(s)	Producer(s)	Length
12.	"Are You Ready" (Soul Seekerz Full Length Club Mix)	Gad; Jean; Lyrica Anderson	Gad	6:45
Total length:				43:06

Hannah Montana Forever – International Amazon MP3 edition (bonus track)
No.	Title	Writer(s)	Producer(s)	Length
12.	"Are You Ready" (Almighty Radio Mix)	Gad; Jean; Lyrica Anderson	Gad	3:55
Total length:				40:16

Hannah Montana Forever – Japanese CD+DVD edition (bonus DVD)
No.	Title	Length
1.	"Que Sera" (music video)
2.	"Ordinary Girl" (music video)
3.	"Gonna Get This" (featuring Iyaz; music video)
4.	"I'm Still Good" (music video)

== Charts and certifications ==
=== Charts ===
Chart (2010)	Peak position
Australian Albums Chart	66
Austrian Albums Chart	25
Belgian Albums Chart (Flanders)	90
Belgian Albums Chart (Wallonia)	81
French Albums Chart	55
German Albums Chart	65
Mexican Albums Chart	33
New Zealand Albums Chart	32
Portuguese Albums Chart	9
Spanish Albums Chart	23
Swiss Albums Chart	74
UK Albums Chart	38
US Billboard 200	11

=== Certifications ===
Region	Certification	Certified units/sales
Brazil (Pro-Música Brasil)	Gold	20,000^{*}
Portugal (AFP)	Platinum	20,000^{^}
United Kingdom (BPI)	Silver	60,000^{‡}
United States (RIAA)	Gold	500,000^{‡}
^{*} Sales figures based on certification alone.^{^} Shipments figures based on certification alone.^{‡} Sales+streaming figures based on certification alone.

== Release history ==
Country	Date	Version	Format	Label	Ref.
Europe	October 15, 2010	Standard	CD; digital download	Walt Disney	
United States	October 19, 2010	Standard	CD; digital download	Walt Disney	
United States	June 24, 2025	Standard	Vinyl	Walt Disney	
