= Robert Hales (director) =

British graphic designer

- Occupations: Graphic designer and music video director.

Robert Hales is a British graphic designer and music video director. Hales has directed music videos by artists such as Westlife, Bridgit Mendler, Avril Lavigne, Tame Impala, Jet, the Veronicas, Fuel, Stereophonics, the Donnas, Justin Timberlake, Nine Inch Nails, Death Cab For Cutie, Miley Cyrus, Gnarls Barkley, Imagine Dragons and Crowded House. Robert Hales has co-directed the video for Nine Inch Nails' "Starfuckers, Inc.", and he also designed the artwork for the CD single of Nine Inch Nails' "The Day the World Went Away."

On 31 August 2006, Hales received an MTV Video Music Award for directing the Gnarls Barkley single "Crazy".

Robert Hales directed the video to "Kiss You Off" by the Scissor Sisters. Hales directed the groundbreaking music video for Justin Timberlake's "LoveStoned" and Britney Spears' animated video for "Break The Ice". In 2012, he directed the video to "Look Around" by the Red Hot Chili Peppers.

== Filmography ==
Year	Artist	Music video
1999	Stone Temple Pilots	"Down" (co-directed with Mark Racco)
2000	Nine Inch Nails	"Starfuckers, Inc." (co-directed with Marilyn Manson)
2000	Richard Ashcroft	"Money to Burn"
2002	Black Rebel Motorcycle Club	"Love Burns"
2002	Vex Red	"Can't Smile"
2002	Kid Rock	"You Never Met a Motherfucker Quite Like Me"
2002	The Datsuns	"In Love"
2002	The Donnas	"Take It Off"
2003	Stereophonics	"Madame Helga"
2003	Jet	"Are You Gonna Be My Girl"
2004	Switchfoot	"Dare You to Move"
2004	Jet	"Look What You've Done"
2004	Elefant	"Misfit"
2005	Rooster	"Deep and Meaningless"
2005	Kano featuring Mike Skinner	"Nite Nite"
2005	Craig David	"Don't Love You No More (I'm Sorry)"
2005	Fort Minor	"Petrified"
2005	The Veronicas	"Everything I'm Not"
2006	Craig David	"Unbelievable"
2006	Gnarls Barkley	"Crazy"
2006	P!NK	"Who Knew" (co-directed with Samuel Bayer and Brian Lazzaro, produced by their one-time trio Dragon)
2006	Gnarls Barkley	"Smiley Faces"
2006	The Panic Channel	"Why Cry"
2006	Jet	"Put Your Money Where Your Mouth Is"
2006	Snow Patrol	"Open Your Eyes"
2006	Oasis	"Acquiesce"
2006	Pete Yorn	"For Us"
2007	Gnarls Barkley	"Go-Go Gadget Gospel"
2007	Justin Timberlake	"LoveStoned"
2007	Mark Ronson featuring Amy Winehouse	"Valerie"
2007	Kings of Leon	"Charmer"
2007	OneRepublic (Timbaland Remix)	"Apologize"
2008	Jonas Brothers	"When You Look Me in the Eyes"
2008	Britney Spears	"Break the Ice"
2008	N.E.R.D	"Spaz"
2008	Shwayze	"Buzzin'"
2008	Delta Goodrem	"In This Life" (US version)
2008	Robin Thicke	"Magic"
2009	Demi Lovato	"Don't Forget"
2009	Jeffree Star	"Get Away with Murder"
2009	Janet Jackson	"Make Me"
2010	Miley Cyrus	"Can't Be Tamed"
2010	Miley Cyrus	"Who Owns My Heart"
2010	Tame Impala	"Lucidity"
2012	Red Hot Chili Peppers	"Look Around"
2012	Soundgarden	"Live to Rise"
2013	Avril Lavigne	"Here's to Never Growing Up"
2013	Bridgit Mendler	"Hurricane"
2014	Lea Michele	"Cannonball"
2014	Jack White	"Would You Fight for My Love?"
2014	Chris Lane	"Broken Windshield View"
2014	Meg Myers	"Go"
2015	Death Cab for Cutie	"Black Sun"
2015	Imagine Dragons	"Shots"
2015	R5	"Let's Not Be Alone Tonight"
2015	Muse	"Dead Inside"
2015	Death Cab for Cutie	"The Ghosts of Beverly Drive"
2017	Morrissey	"Jacky's Only Happy When She's Up on the Stage"
2017	Walk the Moon	"One Foot"
2018	Pale Waves	"Kiss"
2019	Westlife	"Hello My Love"
2019	Westlife	"My Blood"
