= Hank Chen =

Chinese-American actor and comedian

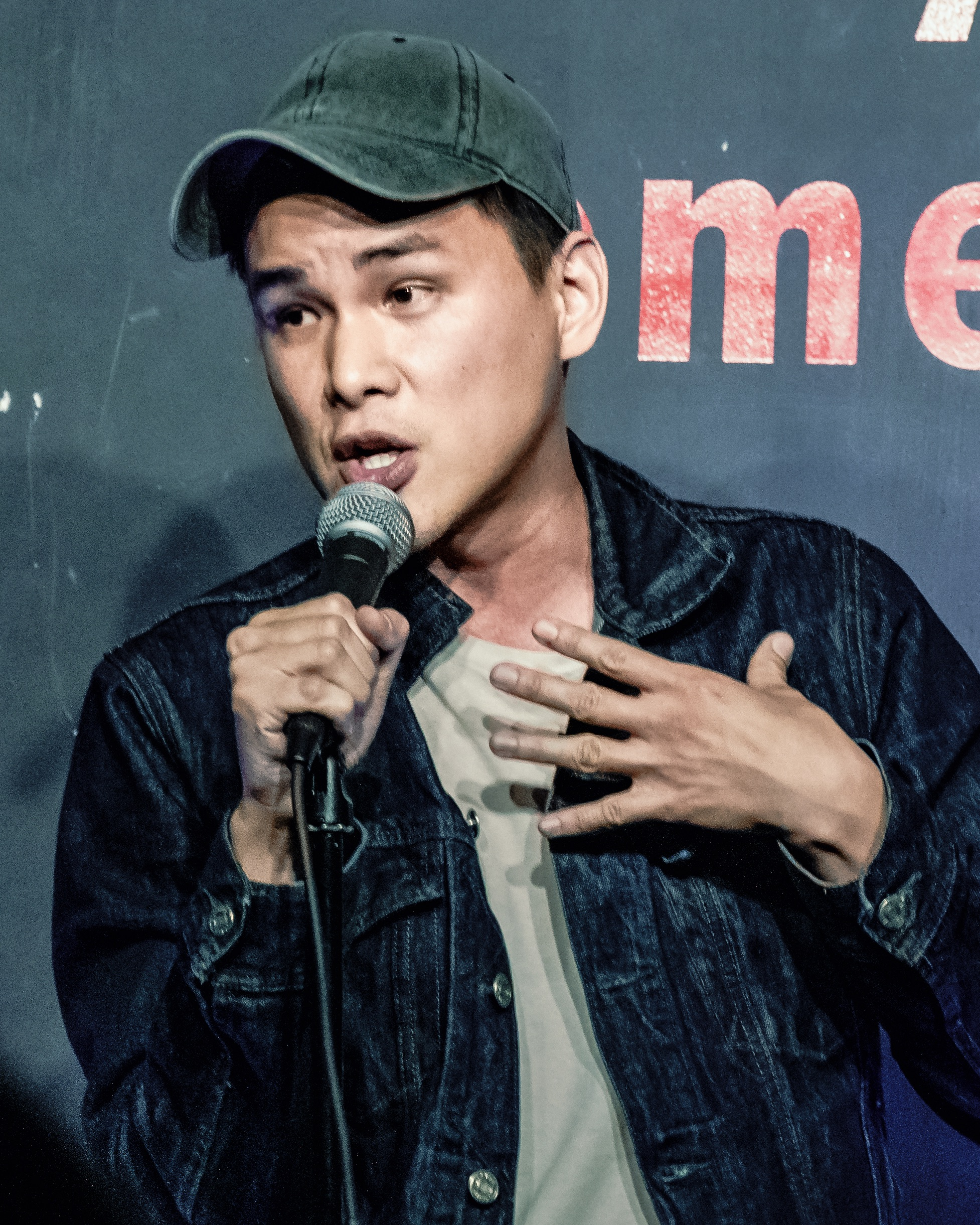
- Hank Chen performing stand up
- Born: Henry Hsing Chen; November 1, 1989 (age 36); Silver Spring, Maryland, U.S.
- Other name: Hankster
- Education: Wheaton College (BA); Pace University (MFA)
- Occupations: Actor; Comedian
- Years active: 2010–present

Hank Chen
- Traditional Chinese: 陳興漢
- Simplified Chinese: 陈兴汉
Transcriptions
Standard Mandarin
- Hanyu Pinyin: Chen Xìng Hàn

Hank Chen (born November 1, 1989) is an American actor and comedian best known for Life-Size 2 and Robin Williams's final theatrical release, The Angriest Man in Brooklyn.

== Early life and education ==
Born as Henry Chen in Silver Spring, Maryland to Taiwanese immigrants, Chen spoke Mandarin Chinese at home before learning English. His parents are engineers. He has a younger sister.

Chen grew up in a religious and conservative household. He is a founding member of advocacy group, OneWheaton supporting LGBT students and alumni from his alma mater.

Raised in the suburbs of Washington, D.C., Chen graduated with an International Baccalaureate diploma from Springbrook High School. At Wheaton College, he majored in sociology with minors in Communications and English, and studied theatre at the University of Westminster in London. Chen remained near Chicago after graduation to work, take acting classes, and perform comedy. He trained with The Second City and joined Stir Friday Night, a sketch comedy ensemble of Asian-American performers. Other SFN alumni include Danny Pudi and Steven Yeun. He attended the Actors Studio Drama School at Pace University MFA program, moving to Brooklyn, New York, where he began his career with a credit on Law & Order: Special Victims Unit.

== Career ==
=== Film and television ===
Chen has appeared on television since 2011 with many credits including Blue Bloods, Lopez, and Transparent.

He made his film debut in The Angriest Man in Brooklyn opposite Robin Williams, followed up by roles in Reese Witherspoon-starrer Home Again, and Janicza Bravo's first full-length feature, Lemon.

In 2018, Chen co-starred in Freeform's Life-Size 2 opposite Tyra Banks and Francia Raisa which was part of the network’s 25 Days of Christmas promotion. The film is the sequel to Life-Size starring Banks and Lindsay Lohan, which originally premiered in 2000 on ABC as part of The Wonderful World of Disney He played Raisa's character's supportive best friend.

In 2021, Chen co-starred in Lifetime's Holiday in Santa Fe opposite Mario Lopez and Emeraude Toubia. The film was part of the network's "It's a Wonderful Lifetime" holiday movie slate.

=== Social media ===
As a young vlogger, Chen was very active on social media which led to many opportunities including being selected to host Verizon's online campaign for 4G LTE in 2011. Chen was the co-host of RealBeauty.com's comedy and fashion show, Visible Panty Lines from Hearst Corporation in 2012.

In 2013, Chen was among one of 100 influencers selected by Ford Motor Company to participate in the Ford Fiesta Movement in which creators were given a Ford Fiesta and sent on "missions" for 6 months. At the conclusion of the campaign, he was awarded "Best Vlog" for his first mission, Fiesta Aqua Agent.

=== Stand-up comedy ===
Chen's debut comedy special, Hank Chen: I'm Not Supposed to be Here was taped and produced by Brian Volk-Weiss and his company, Comedy Dynamics at the El Portal Theatre six days after he was involved in a motorcycle collision in spring 2023. He was prescribed painkillers, wheeled on-stage, and performed sitting on a couch with a fractured pelvis. The special premiered on streaming platforms, satellite radio, and in-flight programming later that year.

After recovering from his injuries in summer 2023, he was recruited by producers, Seven Graham and Alyssa Poteet to perform at the Edinburgh Festival Fringe in Edinburgh, Scotland with LGBTQIA+ comedy show, Alphabet Soup. The show was well-reviewed and made additional international festival headlines when it became known the performers were staying at old Second World War base and Cold War nuclear bunker, Barnton Quarry due to the inflated costs of reasonable accommodations during that time of year in Edinburgh. Graham made the decision "after being quoted £35,000 on Airbnb for a month’s stay."

== Filmography ==
=== Film ===
Year	Title	Role	Notes
2014	The Angriest Man in Brooklyn	Damien	
2014	Queers in the Kingdom: Let Your Light Shine	Himself	Documentary
2015	The Dark Side	Patrick	
2015	Bob Thunder: Internet Assassin	Hank Chen	
2016	When You Have Big Boobs	Kevin	Short
2016	Carry Me	Assistant	Short
2017	Lemon	Lee	
2017	Home Again	Jason G.	
2026	Ugly Cry	Nurse Ethan	

=== Television ===
Year	Title	Role	Notes
2011	Law & Order: Special Victims Unit	P.A.	Episode: "Pursuit"
2011	Blue Bloods	Harry Bell	Episode: "Model Behavior"
2012	Big Morning Buzz Live	Himself	Episode: "Deborah Ann Woll/The Lumineers"
2013	High Maintenance	Hank	Episode: "Elijah"
2014	Transparent	Clayton	Episode: "Moppa"
2014	Criminal Minds	Chuck Ross	Episode: "Fate"
2015	Community	Various	2 episodes
2015	Rizzoli & Isles	Waiter	Episode: "Imitation Game"
2015	Baby Daddy	Jonathan	Episode: "What Happens In Vegas"
2015	Switched at Birth	New Waiter	Episode: "Borrowing Your Enemy's Arrows"
2015	Eastsiders	Hipster Guy #2	3 episodes
2016	Disengaged	Dezi	Episode: "Dresses"
2016	Grace and Frankie	Employee	Episode: "The Bender"
2016	Lopez	Mr. Chen	2 episodes
2016	NCIS: Los Angeles	Minjun Rhee	Episode: "Parallel Resistors"
2017	Criminal Minds: Beyond Borders	Dave McHenry	Episode: "Cinderella and the Dragon"
2017	Casual	Brent	Episode: "The Table"
2017	Strangers	Hank	Episode: "Couples Counseling"
2017	The New 30	Joshua	4 episodes
2018	Scandal	Justice Spivey's Clerk	Episode: "Allow Me To Reintroduce Myself"
2018	Legion	Ryan	Episode: "Chapter 14"
2018	Alex, Inc.	Dale	Episode: "The Rube Goldberg Contraption"
2018	Full Frontal with Samantha Bee	Himself	Episode: "3.14"
2018	Life-Size 2	Brendan	Television movie
2019	The OA	Homer's Roommate	2 episodes
2021	Holiday in Santa Fe	Kevin	Television movie
2023	Hank Chen: I'm Not Supposed To Be Here	Himself	Stand-Up Special
2024	Hacks	Lawrence	Episode: "Join The Club"
2026	It’s Getting Late with Owen Reed	Daniel Lin	Main Cast

=== Podcast Series ===
Year	Title	Role	Notes
2016	Mars 2060: The Colony Files	Dennis McAlister	Episode: "Solar Conjunction"
2023-2024	Macaw	Suzuki	2 episodes
