= The Cutting Edge =

1992 film by Paul Michael Glaser

- Theatrical poster
- Directed by: Paul Michael Glaser
- Written by: Tony Gilroy
- Produced by: Robert W. Cort; Ted Field; Karen Murphy
- Starring: D. B. Sweeney; Moira Kelly; Roy Dotrice; Terry O'Quinn
- Cinematography: Elliot Davis
- Edited by: Michael E. Polakow
- Music by: Patrick Williams
- Production company: Interscope Communications
- Distributed by: Metro-Goldwyn-Mayer
- Release date: March 27, 1992
- Running time: 102 minutes
- Country: United States
- Language: English
- Box office: $25.1 million

The Cutting Edge is a 1992 American sports-romantic comedy film directed by Paul Michael Glaser and written by Tony Gilroy. The plot is about a wealthy, temperamental figure skater (played by Moira Kelly) who is paired with an injury-sidelined ice hockey player (played by D. B. Sweeney) for Olympic figure skating. Competing at the 1992 Winter Olympics in Albertville, France, they have a climactic face-off against a Soviet pair. It spawned a film series including a number of sequels. The film was primarily shot in Toronto and Hamilton, Ontario, Canada. The film has come to be known as a cult classic.

== Plot ==
Kate Moseley is a world-class figure skater representing the United States in the pairs event at the 1988 Winter Olympics in Calgary. She has genuine talent, but years of being spoiled by her wealthy widower father Jack have made her impossible to work with.

Doug Dorsey is captain of the U.S. ice hockey team at the same Winter Olympics and has a lot of offers to go to the NHL teams who want to sign him. Just minutes before a game, he and Kate collide in a hallway in the arena. During the game, Doug suffers a head injury that permanently damages his peripheral vision, leaving him medically unfit to play and ruining his dream of competing in the NHL. During Kate's event, her partner apparently accidentally drops her, albeit with little sign of regret or concern, during their program, costing them a chance at the gold medal.

While training for the 1992 Winter Olympics over the next two years, Kate drives away all potential skating partners with her attitude and perfectionism. Her new coach, Russian native Anton Pamchenko, has to find a replacement, an outsider who doesn't know that Kate is spoiled and difficult. He tracks down Doug, who is back home in Minnesota, working in a steel mill and as a carpenter on the side, living with his brother, and playing in a hockey bar league. Desperate for another chance at Olympic glory, Doug agrees to work as Kate's partner, even though he has macho contempt for figure skating.

Kate's snooty, prima donna behavior gets on his nerves immediately, and their first few practices do not go well as they antagonize each other. However, they develop a mutual respect as both strive to outdo each other in work ethic. As their relationship grows warmer, they learn to set aside their differences, becoming a pair to be reckoned with both on and off the ice. Kate even boldly defends Doug to her former coach who patronizes and insults them, and Doug defends his unusual choice of sport to his own family and friends, whom he had expected to mock him.

At the U.S. Nationals, despite strong performances in the short program and long program, they seem to place third, shattering their Olympic dreams. However, when one of the leading pairs falls during the competition, they advance to second place, earning their spot on the Olympic team. However, their potential is threatened by their growing attraction to each other. Kate attempts to seduce Doug after a night of drunken celebration, revealing that she broke off her engagement to wealthy financier Hale Forrest. Usually a ladies' man, given his growing feelings for her, Doug uncharacteristically rebuffs her advances, recognizing that she is drunk and not thinking clearly. When she gets angry at his rejection and insults him, he is hurt, and as she leaves, he tells her, "It didn't have to be like this."

When a hungover Kate visits Doug's room the next morning, intending to apologize for her behavior, a rival skater answers Doug's door. Realizing that Doug has slept with another woman almost immediately after leaving her, she becomes enraged. However, the temporary rift is set aside when they decide to work on perfecting an extremely difficult skating move invented by Pamchenko, which will assure them a gold medal if they can pull it off without serious injury.

At the finals at the Albertville Olympics, they look to be one of the top pairs competing for the gold. However, another argument threatens their chemistry on the ice, and in the process Doug and Kate both discover that Kate is the fallible partner after all. Before getting on the ice for their decisive performance, Doug professes to Kate that he has fallen in love with her, leaving Kate overcome with emotion, and she decides they are going to do the Pamchenko despite them never having successfully achieved it during practices. They proceed to skate with a passion neither had shown before, ultimately performing the Pamchenko flawlessly to win them the gold medal. When Doug asks Kate why she wanted to perform the risky maneuver, Kate replies because she loves him, and they kiss each other before the cheering crowd.

== Cast ==
- D. B. Sweeney as Doug Dorsey
- Moira Kelly as Kate Moseley
- Roy Dotrice as Anton Pamchenko
- Terry O'Quinn as Jack Moseley
- Dwier Brown as Hale Forrest
- Chris Benson as Walter Dorsey
- Michael Hogan as Doctor
- Kevin Peeks as Brian Newman
- Rachelle Ottley as Lorie Peckarovski
- Barry Flatman as Rick Tuttle
- Christine Hough and Doug Ladret, as Smilkov and Brushkin, the Soviet team in the 1988 Olympics. This Canadian figure skating pair finished ninth in the actual Olympic competition portrayed in the film, just six weeks before the film was released.
- Sharon Carz - skating double for Kate Moseley
- John Denton - skating double for Doug Dorsey

== Music ==
The original music score was composed by Patrick Williams. The film's theme song "Feels Like Forever" was performed by Joe Cocker and written by Diane Warren and Bryan Adams.

=== Soundtrack ===
The soundtrack album was originally released by Rykodisc in 1998; in 2004 it was reissued by Varèse Sarabande with 20 minutes of Patrick Williams' score (tracks 11–22).

1. Street of Dreams – Nia Peeples
2. Cry All Night – Neverland
3. Ride On Time – Black Box
4. Groove Master – Arrow
5. It Ain't Over 'til It's Over – Rosemary Butler & John Townsend
6. Shame Shame Shame – Johnny Winter
7. Turning Circles – Sally Dworsky
8. Baby Now I – Dan Reed Network
9. I've Got Dreams to Remember – Delbert McClinton
10. Feels Like Forever (Theme From The Cutting Edge) – Joe Cocker
11. Ich Namen Gita/Olympic Hockey
12. Battle of the CD's
13. Limo to Mansion/Nine Months Later
14. Kate Skates Alone
15. Chicago Practices
16. Hoedown
17. Tequila
18. Olympic Fanfare/Dubois & Gercel
19. Doug & Kate Get Angry
20. The Russians Skate
21. Finale
22. End Credits

The following songs are heard in the movie but not included on the soundtrack album:

- Lauretta – Malcolm McLaren
- Love Shack – Rosemary Butler
- Auld Lang Syne – Rosemary Butler & Warren Wiebe
- Walking the Dog – John Townsend
- The Race – Yello (used for their competition short program)
- Diddley Daddy – Chris Isaak

== Reception ==
The Cutting Edge was released on March 27, 1992, and grossed $25,105,517 domestically.

The film was met with mixed critical reviews. On Rotten Tomatoes, it has an approval rating of 59% based on 37 reviews, with the site's consensus: "Part contrived romance, part hackneyed sports drama, The Cutting Edge shows how difficult it can be to figure skate through cheese." Metacritic, which uses a weighted average, assigned the film a score of 53 out of 100, based on 21 critics, indicating "mixed or average" reviews. Audiences surveyed by CinemaScore gave the film a grade "A−" on scale of A to F.

Of the leads, Kevin Thomas of the Los Angeles Times wrote "Kelly and Sweeney are evenly matched", and the Chicago Tribune's Gene Siskel said "the chemistry between the co-stars makes it work". Thomas added, "the entire cast and crew deserve full marks for their determination in making something special out of material that so easily could have been bland, predictable or sentimental". In another positive review, Stephen Holden of The New York Times said, "Ms. Kelly's uncompromising portrayal of a high-strung prima donna whose outrageous willfulness masks a girlish vulnerability gives the picture a big charge of energy." In The Baltimore Sun, Stephen Hunter described it as "Taming of the Shrew on ice" and pointed out its lack of realism, but said that it made for an enjoyable film with charm.

== In popular culture ==
The Cutting Edge is referenced multiple times by the fictional Trevor Lefkowitz in the American version of Ghosts, as it is one of his favorite films.

== Sequels ==
The film was followed by several sequels: The Cutting Edge: Going for the Gold (2006), The Cutting Edge: Chasing the Dream (2008) and The Cutting Edge: Fire and Ice (2010), each with mostly different casts. The first sequel, which involves the couple's daughter, moves the timing of The Cutting Edge from 1992 back to the 1984 Winter Olympics so that their daughter could be 21 at the time of the sequel.

== See also ==
- List of films about ice hockey
