= The Cutting Edge (film series) =

- Official home video release, boxset collection artwork
- Based on: The Cutting Edge by Tony Gilroy
- Distributed by: Metro-Goldwyn-Mayer
- Country: United States
- Language: English
- Budget: >$3,000,000 (Total of 1 film) (Note: These figures are based on the available numbers for the theatrical film. Though there are a total four movies released, there is no financial information publicly available for the other releases.)

The Cutting Edge film series consists of American sports-romance films, including one theatrical film and three made-for-television movies which were later released straight-to-home video media. Based on characters and an original story written by Tony Gilroy, the plot centers around the unlikely pairing of differing ice sports athletes, for Olympic title pairs figure skating. Beginning as nothing more than argumentative team collaborations, the featured couples become romantically involved.

The first film, characterized as a romantic comedy in genre, was met with mixed critical reception. The acting was praised, though some identified the mashup of genres as jarring while stating, "There is essentially not an original moment in the entire film, and yet it's skillfully made and well-acted." Sweeney and Kelly agreed during the making of the first installment to only appear in sequels together, though both actors declined the continued attempts by the studios to feature the actors in the sequels which followed.

The three made-for-television sequels, which are categorically romantic dramas, were met with varying degrees of mixed critical reception with a common critique being that they are derivatives of the original film. Going for the Gold was criticized for being "geared toward teens", while being praised for the leads; Chasing the Dream was praised for being "actually kind of fun", with positive reception for Francia Raisa's acting and the film's direction, choreography, and cinematography; while the final installment, Fire and Ice, was met with mixed reception: criticism pointed at being perceived as a cash-grab, while praise was received for believable on-screen chemistry between the leads and for a "touching story".

Over the decades which followed their initial release, the series has accumulated a fanbase; while modern analyses rank the first two installments among the greatest Olympic Games movies, and romantic comedies of all-time.

== Films ==
Film	U.S. release date	Director	Screenwriter(s)	Story by	Producer(s)
The Cutting Edge	March 27, 1992	Paul Michael Glaser	Tony Gilroy	Tony Gilroy	Robert W. Cort, Ted Field and Karen Murphy
The Cutting Edge: Going for the Gold	February 7, 2006	Sean McNamara	Dan Berendsen	Dan Berendsen	David Brookwell, Sean McNamara, David Buelow and David Grace
The Cutting Edge: Chasing the Dream	March 16, 2008	Stuart Gillard	Randall Badat	Susan Estelle Jansen & Randall Badat	Irene Litinsky
The Cutting Edge: Fire and Ice	March 14, 2010	Stephen Herek	Holly Brix	Holly Brix	Irene Litinsky

=== The Cutting Edge (1992) ===
Talented and confident figure-skating prodigy Kate Moseley is denied a gold medal at the 1988 Olympics, after missing her footing and taking a fall. In the following months, as she drives away partner after partner, her coach named Anton searches for a replacement so that she will be ready for the next Olympic games. Anton decides to attempt to pair her with an unorthodoxed teammate; an arrogant former-Olympic hockey star named, Doug Dorsey. Reluctantly working together, they soon realize that the two athletes had briefly encountered years before. The duo's combative collaboration begins to turn into chemistry. As they grow closer in the rink, their relationship becomes romantic in their personal lives.

=== The Cutting Edge: Going for the Gold (2006) ===
Jackie Dorsey is the daughter of 1992 Winter Olympics Gold medalists, Kate Moseley and Doug Dorsey. Growing up under their tutelage, Jackie develops dreams of her own and decides that she will compete and win her own Olympic gold medal. Her dreams seem to come to an abrupt end, after suffering a career threatening injury. As she recovers and strives to overcome her traumatic experience, she is paired with a new skating partner named Alex Harrison. Talented in his own right, the couple find that their respective stubbornness and pride creates a difficult environment. As they begin to trust each other, their relationship changes and becomes romantic in nature. Working together their dreams of becoming Olympic champions, gets closer to becoming a reality.

=== The Cutting Edge: Chasing the Dream (2008) ===
When talented Zack Conroy's pair-skating partner suffers an injury, he is tasked with finding someone to replace her. He accidentally discovers the skilled female hockey player, Alejandra "Alex" Delgado. Though Alex has not had figure skating lessons since childhood, she proves to be a quick study. With the help of coach Jackie Dorsey, Zack and Alex learn to work through their differences, in life and on the rink, so they can reach their goal of competing in Paris.

=== The Cutting Edge: Fire and Ice (2010) ===
The career of figure skating all-star, Alejandra "Alex" Delgado, comes to a standstill after her partner and boyfriend, Zack Conroy, suffered an injury. As their athletic relationship diminishes, so too does their relationship. Following their breakup and experiencing heartbreak, Alex turns to working as an ice skating teacher. Her competitive nature and passion for pairs figure skating rekindles, when an unexpected opportunity arises. Egotistical "bad boy" of speed skating James McKinsey, whose uncontrolled personal life gets him banned from the national team, works with his promotion team to start a career in pairs figure skating. Tempted by the chance at another world title, Alex agrees to work with him. Initial practices prove that their personalities are opposites, though their work-ethic is a match. As they become more familiar with each other, their argumentative clashes escalate until their tumultuous determination becomes personal. As their relationship becomes romantic, they work even harder to reach their life's goals of a championship title.

== Main cast and characters ==
List indicator

This section includes characters who will appear or have appeared in the franchise in main roles.

- An empty grey cell indicates the character was not in the film, or that the character's official presence has not yet been confirmed.

Character	Films			
Character	The Cutting Edge	The Cutting Edge: Going for the Gold	The Cutting Edge: Chasing the Dream	The Cutting Edge: Fire and Ice
Doug Dorsey	D. B. Sweeney	Scott Thompson Baker		
Kate Moseley-Dorsey	Moira Kelly	Stepfanie Kramer		
Jaclyn "Jackie" Dorsey		Christy Carlson Romano	Christy Carlson Romano	
Alex Harrison		Ross Thomas		
Zach Conroy			Matt Lanter	Referenced
Alexandra "Alex" Delgado			Francia Raisa	Francia Raisa
James McKinsey				Brendan Fehr

== Additional crew and production details ==
Film	Crew/Detail					
Film	Composer	Cinematographer	Editor(s)	Production companies	Distributing companies	Running time
The Cutting Edge	Patrick Williams	Elliot Davis	Michael E. Polakow	Interscope Communications	Metro-Goldwyn-Mayer	96 minutes
The Cutting Edge: Going for the Gold	John Coda	Mark Doering–Powell	Jeff W. Canavan	First Family Entertainment, Brookwell McNamara Entertainment, MGM Television	Metro-Goldwyn-Mayer Home Entertainment, ABC Family	94 minutes
The Cutting Edge: Chasing the Dream	Robert Duncan	Pierre Jodoin	James R. Symons	MGM Television	Metro-Goldwyn-Mayer Home Entertainment, ABC Family, The CW Network	92 minutes
The Cutting Edge: Fire and Ice	Bennett Salvay	Pierre Jodoin	Seth Flaum & Anthony Markward	ABC Family Original Movies, MGM Television, Muse Entertainment Enterprises	ABC Family, Disney–ABC Domestic Television	87 minutes

== Reception ==
=== Box office and financial performance ===
Film	Box office gross			Box office ranking		Video sales gross	Budget	Ref.
Film	North America	Other territories	Worldwide	All-time North America	All-time worldwide	North America	Budget	Ref.
The Cutting Edge	$25,105,517	—N/a	$25,105,517	#3,319	#4,585	information not available	information not available	
The Cutting Edge: Going for the Gold	—N/a	—N/a	—N/a	—N/a	—N/a	information not available	$3,000,000	
The Cutting Edge: Chasing the Dream	—N/a	—N/a	—N/a	—N/a	—N/a	information not available	information not available	
The Cutting Edge: Fire and Ice	—N/a	—N/a	—N/a	—N/a	—N/a	information not available	information not available	
Totals	$25,105,517		25,105,517	x̅ 829 (Note: This is an approximate average, based on the all-time standing of each theatrically released film.)	x̅ 1,146 (Note: This is an approximate average, based on the all-time standing of each theatrically released film.)		>$3,000,000	

=== Critical and public response ===
Film	Rotten Tomatoes	CinemaScore
The Cutting Edge	56% (34 reviews)	A−
The Cutting Edge: Going for the Gold	—N/a	—N/a
The Cutting Edge: Chasing the Dream	—N/a	—N/a
The Cutting Edge: Fire and Ice	—N/a	—N/a
