= List of number-one Billboard Regional Mexican Songs of 2000 =

The Billboard Regional Mexican Songs chart ranks the best-performing Regional Mexican singles in the United States. Published weekly by Billboard magazine, it ranks the "most popular regional Mexican songs, ranked by radio airplay audience impressions as measured by Nielsen Music."

== Chart history ==
Key
†	Indicates number 1 on Billboard's year-end regional Mexican chart

Issue date	Song	Artist(s)	Ref.
January 1	"Te ofrezco un corazón"	Banda el Recodo de Cruz Lizárraga	
January 8	"Te quiero mucho"	Los Rieleros del Norte	
January 15	"Te quiero mucho"	Los Rieleros del Norte	
January 22	"Te quiero mucho"	Los Rieleros del Norte	
January 29	"Te ofrezco un corazón"	Banda el Recodo de Cruz Lizárraga	
February 5	"El listón de tu pelo" †	Los Ángeles Azules	
February 12	"El listón de tu pelo" †	Los Ángeles Azules	
February 19	"El listón de tu pelo" †	Los Ángeles Azules	
February 26	"El listón de tu pelo" †	Los Ángeles Azules	
March 4	"Morir de amor"	Conjunto Primavera	
March 11	"Morir de amor"	Conjunto Primavera	
March 18	"El listón de tu pelo" †	Los Ángeles Azules	
March 25	"El listón de tu pelo" †	Los Ángeles Azules	
April 1	"Morir de amor"	Conjunto Primavera	
April 8	"Morir de amor"	Conjunto Primavera	
April 15	"Morir de amor"	Conjunto Primavera	
April 22	"El listón de tu pelo" †	Los Ángeles Azules	
April 29	"Morir de amor"	Conjunto Primavera	
May 6	"Morir de amor"	Conjunto Primavera	
May 13	"Morir de amor"	Conjunto Primavera	
May 20	"Yo sé que te acordarás"	Banda el Recodo de Cruz Lizárraga	
May 27	"Yo sé que te acordarás"	Banda el Recodo de Cruz Lizárraga	
June 3	"Yo sé que te acordarás"	Banda el Recodo de Cruz Lizárraga	
June 10	"Yo sé que te acordarás"	Banda el Recodo de Cruz Lizárraga	
June 17	"Yo sé que te acordarás"	Banda el Recodo de Cruz Lizárraga	
June 24	"Yo sé que te acordarás"	Banda el Recodo de Cruz Lizárraga	
July 1	"Yo sé que te acordarás"	Banda el Recodo de Cruz Lizárraga	
July 8	"Secreto de amor"	Joan Sebastian	
July 15	"Yo sé que te acordarás"	Banda el Recodo de Cruz Lizárraga	
July 22	"Yo sé que te acordarás"	Banda el Recodo de Cruz Lizárraga	
July 29	"Yo sé que te acordarás"	Banda el Recodo de Cruz Lizárraga	
August 5	"Secreto de amor"	Joan Sebastian	
August 12	"Yo sé que te acordarás"	Banda el Recodo de Cruz Lizárraga	
August 19	"Yo sé que te acordarás"	Banda el Recodo de Cruz Lizárraga	
August 26	"Yo sé que te acordarás"	Banda el Recodo de Cruz Lizárraga	
September 2	"En cada gota de mi sangre"	Conjunto Primavera	
September 9	"Yo sé que te acordarás"	Banda el Recodo de Cruz Lizárraga	
September 16	"En cada gota de mi sangre"	Conjunto Primavera	
September 23	"En cada gota de mi sangre"	Conjunto Primavera	
September 30	"Yo sé que te acordarás"	Banda el Recodo de Cruz Lizárraga	
October 7	"Yo sé que te acordarás"	Banda el Recodo de Cruz Lizárraga	
October 14	"Yo sé que te acordarás"	Banda el Recodo de Cruz Lizárraga	
October 21	"Yo sé que te acordarás"	Banda el Recodo de Cruz Lizárraga	
October 28	"Yo sé que te acordarás"	Banda el Recodo de Cruz Lizárraga	
November 4	"Te soñé"	El Coyote y su Banda Tierra Santa	
November 11	"Te soñé"	El Coyote y su Banda Tierra Santa	
November 18	"De paisano a paisano"	Los Tigres del Norte	
November 25	"De paisano a paisano"	Los Tigres del Norte	
December 2	"Poema de amor"	Renán Almendárez Coello	
December 9	"De paisano a paisano"	Los Tigres del Norte	
December 16	"De paisano a paisano"	Los Tigres del Norte	
December 23	"Poema de amor"	Renán Almendárez Coello	
December 30	"De paisano a paisano"	Los Tigres del Norte	
