= Shanica Knowles =

American actress (born 1990)

- Born: November 17, 1990 (age 35)
- Other name: Shanica
- Occupations: Actress, singer, songwriter
- Years active: 2004–present

Shanica Knowles (born November 17, 1990), also known mononymously as Shanica, is an American actress, singer-songwriter and instrumentalist, known for her roles as Amber Addison on Hannah Montana, Shauna Keaton on Jump In!, and Vanessa on Unfabulous. She has also portrayed the roles of Tichina Arnold on Surviving Compton: Dre, Suge & Michel'le, Simone Burch on The Young and the Restless, and Tahlia on Life-Size 2.

== Career ==
Knowles made her first major acting appearance in 2005 when she played the recurring character Vanessa on season two of the hit Nickelodeon television show Unfabulous. She was later in the Disney Channel Original Movie, Jump In! as Shauna Keaton, alongside Corbin Bleu and Keke Palmer. In 2007, she played a small role in Super Sweet 16: The Movie. Her biggest and most well-known role to date, however, has come from her recurring role as Amber Addison, a snobby popular mean girl and frenemy/rival of main characters Miley Stewart and Lilly Truscott, on the mega-successful Disney Channel television show Hannah Montana, appearing in all four seasons of the show during its run from 2006 to 2011.

In 2015, she starred as Tichina Arnold in the Lifetime biopic Surviving Compton. Knowles appeared as a recurring character, Simone Burch, on the long-running CBS soap opera, The Young and the Restless in 2018, and also co-starred in the Freeform television film Life-Size 2 in December 2018 opposite Tyra Banks and Francia Raisa.

== Personal life ==
Despite numerous reports to the contrary due to sharing the same last name, Shanica has stated that she has no relation to Beyoncé and Solange Knowles.

== Filmography ==
=== Film ===
Year	Title	Role	Notes
2007	Jump In!	Shauna Keaton	TV movie
2007	Super Sweet 16: The Movie	Sierra	TV movie
2011	3 Times a Charm	Shana	
2012	Sassy Pants	Amber	
2015	Megachurch Murder	Hanna Spears	
2015	Birthday Boy	Winona	Short
2016	Surviving Compton: Dre, Suge & Michel'le	Tichina Arnold	TV movie
2018	The Time Capsule	Jane	TV movie
2018	When It Comes Around	Lisa	
2018	Babysitter's Nightmare	Kaci Washington	TV movie
2018	Life-Size 2	Tahlia	TV movie
2020	Christmas on the Menu	Iris Davenport	TV movie
2021	Twice Bitten	Kainyah	

=== Television ===
Year	Title	Role	Notes
2006	Unfabulous	Vanessa	Recurring cast: season 2
2006–11	Hannah Montana	Amber Addison	Recurring cast: season 1-3, guest: season 4
2011	Harry's Law	Shonda	Episode: "Bangers in the House"
2011	In the Flow with Affion Crockett	Ella	Episode: "Pass the Torch"
2011	Awkward.	Michelle	Recurring cast: season 1
2011	Pretty Tough	Pickle	Episode: "Episode #1.1"
2012	Melissa & Joey	Sandra	Episode: "Breaking Up Is Hard To Do"
2013	Suburgatory	Amanda	Episode: "Body Talk"
2013	Real Husbands of Hollywood	Ronday Vu	Episode: "Frauditions"
2014	Love Handles	Face	Recurring cast
2018	The Young and the Restless	Simone Burch	Regular Cast
