= An American Pickle =

2020 film directed by Brandon Trost

- Original release poster
- Directed by: Brandon Trost
- Screenplay by: Simon Rich
- Based on: "Sell Out" by Simon Rich
- Produced by: Seth Rogen; Evan Goldberg; James Weaver
- Starring: Seth Rogen; Sarah Snook
- Cinematography: John Guleserian
- Edited by: Lisa Zeno Churgin
- Music by: Michael Giacchino (original themes); Nami Melumad (score)
- Production companies: Warner Max; Point Grey Pictures
- Distributed by: Warner Bros. Pictures
- Release date: August 6, 2020
- Running time: 89 minutes
- Country: United States
- Language: English
- Budget: $20 million+
- Box office: $499,649

An American Pickle is a 2020 American comedy-drama film directed by Brandon Trost (in his solo directorial debut) and written by Simon Rich, based on his 2013 short story "Sell Out". The film stars Seth Rogen as an Eastern European Jewish immigrant who gets preserved in a vat of pickles and wakes up a century later in modern-day New York City, attempting to fit in with the assistance of his last remaining descendant (also played by Rogen).

Originally intended to be released by Sony Pictures, the film's rights were sold to Warner Bros. Pictures in April 2020. It was digitally released in the United States on August 6, 2020, the first original film released by HBO Max, and theatrically in the United Kingdom the following day. The film received generally mixed reviews from critics, with Rogen's dual performance being praised. It later received a release on video on demand for rental and purchase.

== Plot ==
Herschel Greenbaum and wife, Sarah, are struggling Jewish laborers from Eastern Europe. They emigrate from their shtetl to America in 1919, after their village is ravaged by Russian Cossacks. He finds a job at a pickle factory and saves up enough to purchase two graves at a Jewish cemetery. Meanwhile, Sarah becomes pregnant with their son. One day, while working, Herschel falls into a vat of pickles just as the factory is closed for health reasons, leaving him brined for 100 years.

Waking up in Brooklyn in 2019, Herschel discovers that his only living relative is his great-grandson Ben. He works as a freelance app developer and is currently developing the app "Boop Bop", a service that checks companies' ethics when buying their products. Ben reluctantly agrees to go with Herschel to the cemetery where Sarah and his son along with Ben's parents are buried.

Herschel is disgusted to find the cemetery in shambles with a Russian vodka billboard overlooking it. This causes him to assault construction workers putting up the billboard, leading to him and Ben being arrested. Ben bails them out of jail. Now he finds that he cannot get investors for his app due to his new criminal record, so he disowns Herschel.

Herschel decides to begin a pickle business, using leftover cucumbers discarded by groceries and restaurants and he builds a cart himself out of leftover material. He seeks to buy and remove the billboard overlooking the cemetery. Herschel's homemade pickles are a huge success and create a sensation on social media.

However, the envious Ben tells health inspectors that Herschel has been using discarded produce, causing him to be fined $12,000. Herschel bounces back from this with the assistance of unpaid interns, causing his business to become even more popular. He uses his new-found wealth to refurbish the cemetery and remove the billboard. Herschel's success leads to Ben envying him even more.

Ben challenges Herschel to post his outdated thoughts on Twitter. With the help of his intern, he begins tweeting controversial statements. While initially met with protests and boycotts, Herschel is then seen as an icon of free speech and empowerment. He is courted by the media who turn him into an iconoclastic hero, although Herschel still does not fully understand the modern world.

During a televised interview program, Ben shows up in disguise and during the question-and-answer session, is asked his thoughts on controversial subjects knowing Herschel will blurt out something inadvertently offensive, as usual. Sure enough, Herschel's rant causes a public backlash. Now despised, the government investigates his citizenship status and attempts to deport Herschel after his immigration files cannot be located.

Herschel arrives at Ben's apartment, who reluctantly agrees to help him get to the Canadian border. Through this, the men begin to mend their relationship. Herschel states that he is disappointed that Ben is more committed to his app than his family's legacy. Ben admits that he tried to sabotage Herschel's business. In his anger, Herschel strikes him, steals his backpack and clothes, shaves his beard and escapes posing as Ben.

Due to their striking resemblance, Herschel turns Ben in to the police and falsely identifies him as Herschel. The real Ben is put on trial and fails to convince the judge that he is in fact Ben and Herschel has taken his place. He is then deported and sent to the village where Herschel was born.

In Ben's apartment, Herschel discovers that the app's name, "Boop Bop", was actually from an old childhood drawing Ben made for his parents. Herschel realizes that the app he derided was really Ben's way of memorializing his late parents. Feeling responsible for Ben, Herschel travels back to his former shtetl where he finds him homeless and taken in by kind strangers in a local synagogue. They reconcile, and some time later return to Brooklyn, with plans to start a business together developing a pickle-selling website.

== Cast ==
- Seth Rogen as Herschel Greenbaum / Ben Greenbaum
- Sarah Snook as Sarah Greenbaum
- Eliot Glazer as Christian
- Jorma Taccone as Liam
- Kalen Allen as Kevin
- Molly Evensen as Clara
- Kevin O'Rourke as Dane Brunt
- Joanna P. Adler as Professor Kim Ecklund
- Sean Whalen as Scientist
- Geoffrey Cantor as David Greenbaum
- Carol Leifer as Susan Greenbaum
- Marsha Stephanie Blake as Inspector Sanders
- Liz Cackowski as Susan O’Malley
- Tim Robinson as Prosecuting Attorney
- Betsy Sodaro as Defense Attorney

== Production ==
Seth Rogen and Simon Rich began to discuss the idea for the film as early as 2007. On May 29, 2013, it was announced that Sony Pictures had acquired the screen rights to the short story "Sell Out" by Rich. Producers were set to consist of Rogen, Evan Goldberg, and James Weaver, while Rich was expected to serve as an executive producer. Production companies involved with the film were slated to include Point Grey Pictures.

On September 27, 2018, it was announced that Brandon Trost was attached to direct the film, after working as director of photography in numerous films starring Seth Rogen, and that Rich would write the film, while additional producers included Alexandria McAtee.

Alongside the directing announcement, it was confirmed that the film would star Rogen. On November 26, 2018, it was announced that Maya Erskine, Sarah Snook, Eliot Glazer, Kalen Allen, Molly Evensen, and Kevin O'Rourke had joined the cast (although Erskine ultimately did not appear in the film). Principal photography took place in Pittsburgh, Pennsylvania from October 29 to December 22, 2018. In an interview with Corridor Digital, Rogen revealed that they spent a month shooting his scenes as Herschel before shooting his scenes as Ben, as he wanted Herschel's beard to be authentic.

== Music ==
The music was composed by Nami Melumad and Michael Giacchino wrote the themes for the film, including a suite titled "Pickles, Suite or Sour."

== Release ==
On April 27, 2020, it was announced Warner Bros. had acquired worldwide distribution rights to the film from Sony Pictures. It was digitally released in the United States on HBO Max and Canada on VOD partner Crave on August 6, 2020. In November, Variety reported the film was the 20th-most watched straight-to-streaming title of 2020 up to that point.

The film was theatrically shown in the United Kingdom on August 7, 2020. It made $36,194 from 162 theaters in its UK debut, finishing fourth at the box office. The film also screened in Israel as part of the Jerusalem Film Festival. The film was removed from HBO Max in July 2022 but remained on Amazon Prime Video.

== Reception ==
On review aggregator Rotten Tomatoes, the film holds an approval rating of 72% based on 165 reviews, with an average rating of 6.1/10. The website's critics consensus reads, "An American Pickle lacks the tart snap viewers might expect given its creative premise, but Seth Rogen's dual performance makes this a low-key comedy to relish." On Metacritic, the film has a weighted average score of 58 out of 100, based on 39 critics, indicating "mixed or average" reviews.

Writing for The Hollywood Reporter, David Rooney said: "An American Pickle is neither the most substantial nor the most sophisticated comedy, but its soulful sweetness outweighs its flaws." Barry Hertz of The Globe and Mail gave the film three out of four stars and wrote: "[Rogen] also manages to make the film's har-har dual-role conceit work beyond mere shtick. There is Herschel, and there is Ben, and Rogen plays each one of them with a decidedly unique energy. Meanwhile, director Brandon Trost, a longtime cinematographer for such Rogen films as Neighbors and The Interview, makes the mensch-on-mensch action seem as real as can be."

Owen Gleiberman of Variety called the film "too cantankerous to be funny and too preposterous to believe" and wrote that "An American Pickle, in its ethnically satirical and scattered way, lacks the integrity of its own ridiculousness. It's pungent but flavorless: an unkosher dill."
