= Emeraude Toubia =

American actress (born 1989)

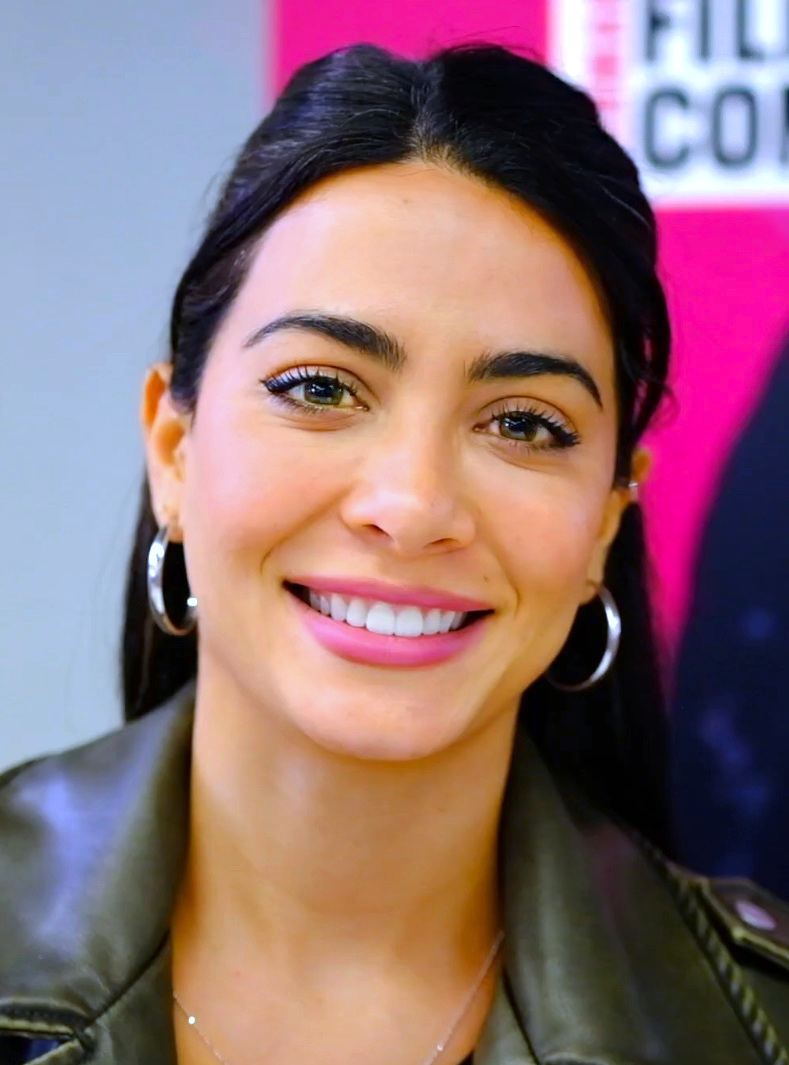
- Toubia at German Film & Comic Con 2024
- Born: March 1, 1989 (age 37); Montreal, Quebec, Canada
- Occupation: Actress
- Years active: 2008–present
- Agent: Innovative Artists
- Spouse: Prince Royce (m. 2018; div. 2022)

Emeraude Toubia (emm-ROD-too-BEE-uhh, born March 1, 1989) is a Canadian-American actress. From 2016 to 2019, she portrayed Isabelle Lightwood on the Freeform fantasy series Shadowhunters. Toubia has starred as Lily Diaz on the Amazon Prime Video romantic comedy series With Love from 2021-2023

== Early life and education ==
Toubia was born in Montreal, Quebec, Canada. She was raised in Brownsville, Texas as an only child. Toubia's mother, Mirta Sonia (née Solis), was born and raised in Ciudad Victoria, Mexico, and her father is Gaby Toubia, the son of Elias Toubia and Zomorrod Hilany, a Lebanese American.

As a child, Toubia was professionally trained in classical ballet, flamenco, belly dance, and lyrical dance. Toubia attended Homer Hanna High School in Brownsville for her secondary education. Since the age of fifteen, Toubia had competed in several beauty pageants; she was crowned Miss South Texas, Miss Rio Grande Valley America, and Miss Teen Brownsville.

== Career ==
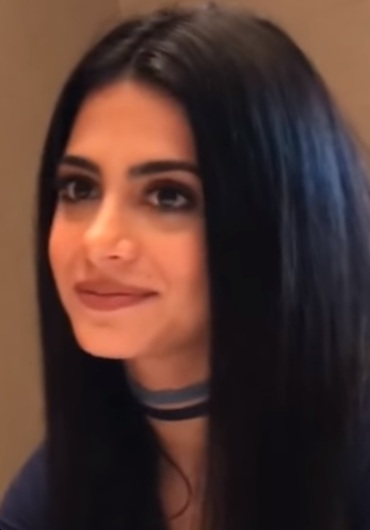
Toubia in 2016

In 1999, at the age of ten, Toubia made her first television appearance on Televisa's children's program El Mundo de los Niños. She became widely known in 2008, when she was selected to participate on the second season of the Univision beauty pageant series Nuestra Belleza Latina, where the participants were trained rigorously in acting, presenting, dancing and other activities; Toubia was voted first runner-up. Since then, she has been featured in advertisements for brands such as Maybelline, J. C. Penney, Sony, Garnier, and AT&T.

In 2009, she joined the second season of Model Latina, finishing in fifth place. She was then a semifinalist in Miss Texas USA 2010. From 2011 to 2013, Toubia served as a presenter for several NBC Universo music and entertainment shows, including The Arena, 18 & Over, and mun2POP. She co-hosted the mun2 red carpet special for the 2013 Billboard Latin Music Awards. In 2013, Toubia made her acting debut as Elizabeth on the Nickelodeon Latin America youth telenovela 11-11: En mi cuadra nada cuadra, for which she was coached by Academy Award-nominated actress Adriana Barraza.

In 2014, she appeared as Dulce Rincón on Venevisión's telenovela Cosita linda. The following year, Toubia portrayed Stephanie Karam on the Univision-Venevisión telenovela Voltea pa' que te enamores. In 2016, Toubia began portraying the half-human, half-angel warrior Isabelle Lightwood on Freeform's fantasy series Shadowhunters, based on The Mortal Instruments book series by Cassandra Clare. That same month, she appeared alongside Prince Royce in the music video for his single "Culpa al Corazón".

Since 2021, Toubia has starred as Lily Diaz on the Amazon Prime Video romantic comedy series With Love. She is set to appear in the upcoming romantic comedy film The Redo.

May 2026, Toubia signed with Innovative Artists for representation.

== Personal life ==
Toubia began dating musician Prince Royce in 2011. They were married in San Miguel de Allende, Mexico on November 30, 2018, and resided in Studio City, Los Angeles. They announced plans to divorce in March 2022. Since 2023, she has been in a relationship with Lithuanian actor Arnas Fedaravicius.

Toubia supports the Get Schooled non-profit organization; on May 26, 2016, she visited Middle College High School in San Bernardino, California to meet students and act as their "celebrity principal" for the day.

== Filmography ==
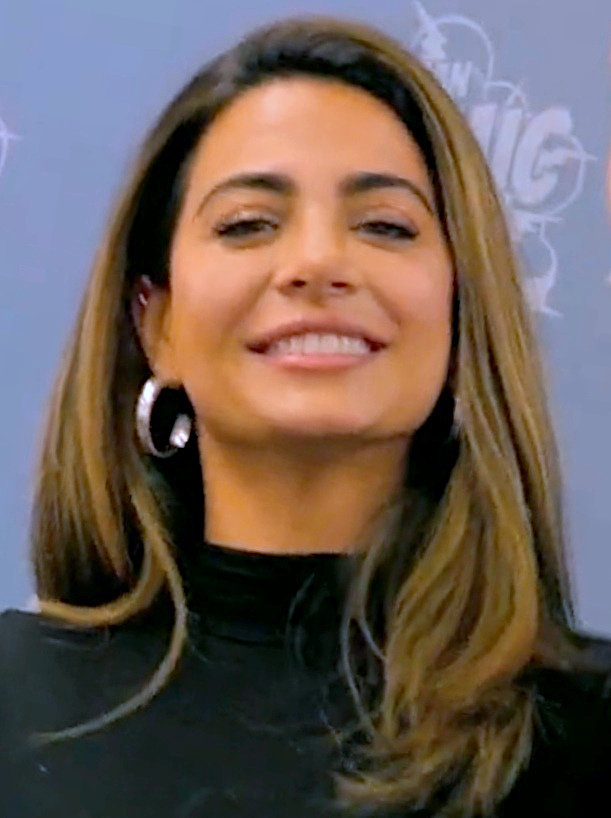
Emeraude Toubia at the German Comic Con 2023

Film and television roles
Year	Title	Role	Notes
2010	Aurora	Receptionist	Episode: "Gran lanzamiento"
2013	11-11: En mi cuadra nada cuadra	Elizabeth	75 episodes
2014	Cosita linda	Dulce Rincón	96 episodes
2015	Voltea pa' que te enamores	Stephanie Karam	29 episodes
2015	Tattooed Love	Esmeralda	
2016–2019	Shadowhunters	Isabelle Lightwood	Main role; 55 episodes
2019	Love in the Sun	Alana	Television film (Hallmark)
2021	Holiday in Santa Fe	Belinda Sawyer	Television film; also co-executive producer
2021–2023	With Love	Lily Diaz	Main role
2025	Rosario	Rosario	Main role
2025	Paws in the City	Issa	Television film

Music video appearances
Year	Title	Artist(s)
2016	"Culpa al Corazón"	Prince Royce

== Awards and nominations ==
Year	Award	Category	Nominated work	Result	Refs
2017	19th Teen Choice Awards	Choice TV Actress: Fantasy/Sci-Fi	Shadowhunters	Nominated	
2018	20th Teen Choice Awards	Choice TV Actress: Fantasy/Sci-Fi	Shadowhunters	Nominated	
