= Extreme Dating =

2004 American film

- 2006 DVD release poster
- Directed by: Lorena David
- Written by: Jeff Schectman
- Produced by: Mark Roberts
- Starring: Devon Sawa; Amanda Detmer; Jamie-Lynn Sigler; Andrew Keegan; Ian Virgo; Meat Loaf; Lee Tergesen; John DiMaggio; Meagen Fay
- Cinematography: Sonja Rom
- Edited by: Lorena David
- Music by: Scott Gilman
- Production companies: Third Eagle Productions; Filmstar Productions
- Distributed by: Warner Home Video
- Release dates: June 25, 2004 (United Kingdom); February 14, 2006 (United States)
- Running time: 96 minutes
- Country: United States
- Language: English
- Budget: $2.5 million

Extreme Dating is a 2004 American crime romantic comedy film directed by Lorena David, written by Jeff Schectman, and starring Devon Sawa, Amanda Detmer, Jamie-Lynn Sigler, Andrew Keegan, Ian Virgo, Meat Loaf, Lee Tergesen, John DiMaggio, and Meagen Fay. The film follows four friends who contrive dangerous accidents in order to find romantic partners and accidentally hire ex-convicts for a planned kidnapping.

== Premise ==
Four friends in their 20s create dangerous scenarios in order to find romantic partners after one of them meets a girl during a skiing accident. They accidentally hire ex-convicts for a planned kidnapping scheme that they believe will find them dates.

Surprise ending.

== Cast ==
- Devon Sawa as Daniel Roenick
- Amanda Detmer as Lindsay Culver
- Jamie-Lynn Sigler as Amy Baker
- Andrew Keegan as Troy Riley
- Ian Virgo as Packer Ellison
- Meat Loaf as Marshall Jackson
- Lee Tergesen as Hack
- John DiMaggio as AJ
- Meagen Fay as Detective Branson
- Nectar Rose as Jamie
- Ashley Jones as Amanda
- Dylan Neal as Sean
- Amanda Foreman as Tracy
- Clyde Kusatsu as Joe
- Shawn Michael Howard as Detective Rawlings
- Nancy Linehan Charles as Maggie
- Buck Kartalian as Earl
- Jerry Hardin as Jake
- Patti Negri as herself

== Production ==
Filming took place in Big Bear City, California, as well as at a camp in Malibu and on stage at Universal Studios Hollywood.

== Release ==
In November 2003, Franchise Pictures acquired the worldwide distribution rights to Extreme Dating. The film was released in the United Kingdom on June 25, 2004.

DVD format was "released on by Warner Home Video, Extreme Dating unfortunately got caught up in numerous distributors bankruptcies and is not currently available" (new).

== Reception ==
Christopher Null of Filmcritic.com gave the film a negative review, criticizing its "tired, insulting plot" and "quickie production values," and stating that the film "should have earned the Lampoon seal of mediocrity."

VideoHound's Golden Movie Retriever writes: "No hilarity ensues, just embarrassment."
