= Meet Me Next Christmas =

2024 film by Rusty Cundieff

- Release poster
- Directed by: Rusty Cundieff
- Written by: Camilla Rubis; Molly Haldeman
- Produced by: Mark Roberts
- Starring: Christina Milian; Devale Ellis; Kofi Siriboe; Tymika Tafari; Mitch Grassi; Scott Hoying; Kirstin Maldonado; Kevin Olusola; Matt Sallee; Kalen Allen
- Cinematography: Andy Strahorn
- Edited by: Michael Jablow
- Music by: Dara Taylor
- Production company: Roberts Media
- Distributed by: Netflix
- Release date: November 6, 2024
- Running time: 106 minutes
- Country: United States
- Language: English

Meet Me Next Christmas is a 2024 American Christmas romantic comedy film directed by Rusty Cundieff and written by Molly Haldeman and Camilla Rubis. It stars Christina Milian, Devale Ellis, Kofi Siriboe, Tymika Tafari, Mitch Grassi, Scott Hoying, Kirstin Maldonado, Kevin Olusola, Matt Sallee, and Kalen Allen.

Hoping to reconnect with the man she met the previous year in the airport, the desperate Layla hires Teddy to secure a ticket to a show in NYC - the sold out Pentatonix Christmas Eve Concert.

The film was released by Netflix on November 6, 2024.

== Plot ==
Layla's flight to NYC to spend Christmas with her boyfriend Tanner is delayed, so she takes advantage of the first-class lounge. There, she briefly meets Teddy, then James. Layla gives James a sampling of a Pentatonix Christmas Eve concert. Hooked, he proposes they meet at the following Christmas Eve concert if they are both single, leaving it to fate if they meet again.

Almost a year later, Layla goes home early to surprise Tanner with dinner, only to find him cheating on her. Commiserating with her friend Roxy, she is reminded of the doctor's many flaws. Three days before Christmas, Layla remembers the pact she had made with James and frantically seeks Pentatonix tickets, as for once she does not have any.

Finding the concert sold out, Layla further feels motivated as she sees James' photo buying the tickets on a website. Unable to secure tickets on her own, Roxy refers Layla to Impromptu, a pricey company famed for getting the impossible for their clients. Teddy works at Impromptu, but has not done very well as a concierge. As his probationary period is ending, his boss tasks him with getting the tickets for Layla as his definitive last chance to prove himself.

Teddy vaguely recognizes Layla, but they hurry out to find his contact before he remembers. When they find the kiosk closed, they then chase down a scalper through Craig's list. Davey gets $500 plus a $150 necklace from Layla, escaping just as the pair discover they are tickets for last year's show.

The pair next has contact with a very wealthy couple. The wife gifts Layla a designer dress, and they are tasked with hunting down an exclusive Chanel purse in exchange for the ticket. At the store, after a long wait in line, Teddy manages to get them the last one available, but Layla generously lets a man whose wife has recently recovered from an illness have it.

Unbeknownst to them, Pentatonix are following Layla and Teddy's joint quest. The band senses Teddy's growing feelings for her, although the pair themselves seem oblivious.

Next, they head to Roxy's in Harlem to regroup. Teddy demonstrates his culinary skills, as he used to be a chef for a Michelin-rated restaurant. His cousin Jordy gets them to Teddy's mom in Brooklyn, who convinces them to prepare a lip-sync performance for the Snow Ball to win the tickets. He trains them, then Teddy takes a break to prepare crème brulée for his mom. Seeing the little Santa ramekin pots, she remembers their meeting in the airport lounge a year ago.

At the Snow Ball, Layla and Teddy's performance ends with a passionate kiss, but second place. When Pentatonix hears, they soon send Layla a ticket, under the condition that Teddy go as Santa. Once he arrives, they reveal their planned number that includes him sliding down the chimney to her.

Meanwhile, as Roxy helps her prepare, Layla confesses her feelings for Teddy. She hurries to the show, running into James. Believing he is there for her, which he is not, she also tells him about Teddy. Layla and Teddy, after a few more mishaps, meet on stage, declare their love and kiss.

== Cast ==
- Christina Milian as Layla
- Devale Ellis as Teddy
- Mitch Grassi as Mitch
- Scott Hoying as Scott
- Kirstin Maldonado as Kirstin
- Kevin Olusola as Kevin
- Matt Sallee as Matt
- Tymika Tafari as Roxy
- Kofi Siriboe as James
- Theresa Tova as Debra
- Kalen Allen as Jordy
- Priyanka as herself

== Production ==
The film is directed by Rusty Cundieff and written by Molly Haldeman and Camilla Rubis. Mark Roberts produced under his company, while Simon Lythgoe and Matt Code were executive producers. Christina Milian stars and is also an executive producer on the film. The cast also includes Kofi Siriboe, Devale Ellis, Kalen Allen and the music group Pentatonix.

Principal photography took place in Toronto.

== Release ==
The film was released on Netflix on November 6, 2024.

== Reception ==
On the review aggregator website Rotten Tomatoes, 69% of 13 critics' reviews are positive, with an average rating of 6.1/10.
