= Rosario (2025 film) =

- Theatrical release poster
- Directed by: Felipe Vargas
- Written by: Alan Trezza
- Produced by: Jon Silk; Javier Chapa; Phillip Braun
- Starring: Emeraude Toubia; Constanza Gutiérrez; David Dastmalchian; José Zúñiga; Diana Lein; Paul Ben-Victor; Guillermo García; Isabella Hoyos
- Cinematography: Carmen Cabana
- Edited by: Claudia Castello
- Music by: Brooke Blair; Will Blair
- Production companies: Silk Mass; Mucho Mas Media; Highland Film Group
- Distributed by: Mucho Mas Releasing
- Release date: May 2, 2025
- Running time: 88 minutes
- Country: United States
- Language: English
- Box office: $1.2 million

Rosario is a 2025 American horror film directed by Felipe Vargas in his feature directorial debut. The film stars Emeraude Toubia, David Dastmalchian, José Zúñiga, Diana Lein and Paul Ben-Victor.

== Plot ==
Rosario "Rose" Fuentes, a successful Wall Street stockbroker, receives news of her estranged grandmother Griselda's sudden death. Despite an impending snowstorm, Rosario returns to Griselda's apartment in New York City to sort through her belongings. Upon arrival, she's informed by the building superintendent, Marty, that due to the storm, emergency services are delayed, leaving her to spend the night alone with Griselda's corpse.

As the night progresses, Rosario begins to experience unsettling phenomena. She discovers a hidden chamber in the apartment filled with occult artifacts, including a Palo spellbook, voodoo-like dolls, a human skull, and animal skeletons. These items reveal Griselda's practice of Palo, a syncretic religion blending African spiritualism and Catholicism.

Rosario learns that Griselda had been performing rituals requiring daily blood sacrifices. Believing that her grandmother attempted to curse her, Rosario attempts to perform a ritual to break the curse, but to no effect. Supernatural occurrences escalate as Rosario is tormented by visions of her deceased mother, Elena, appearing as a decaying corpse.

After a conversation with a neighbor resident Joe, Rosario realizes that Griselda has made a deal with the evil spirit Kobayende, in order to protect Rosario and help her realize her dreams. Rosario manages to perform a ritual that traps Kobayende inside Griselda's corpse.

When morning arrives, Rosario's father comes to the apartment. It is then that Rosario discovers that her father was the one who made the deal with Kobayende and not her Grandmother, and that Griselda was offering her blood to keep Kobayende at bay. Rosario's father attempts to continue the blood sacrifices, but that causes him to become possessed by Kobayende and attack Rosario. The neighbor, Joe, attempts to come to Rosario's help, but Kobayende murders him. Eventually Rosario manages to kill her father, and believes to have thus defeated Kobayende.

In a final scene, Rosario is seen helping the doorman of her firm's building, who had previously approached her for help but was denied due to his low income. After the doorman and his wife leave, however, Kobayende's decayed hand erupts from Rosario's mouth.

== Cast ==
- David Dastmalchian as Joe
- Emeraude Toubia as Rosario
- José Zúñiga as Oscar
- Paul Ben-Victor as Marty
- Diana Lein as Elena
- Emilia Faucher as Young Rosario
- Constanza Gutierrez as Griselda

== Production ==
In October 2023, it was reported that a high-concept horror film titled Rosario was in development by director Felipe Vargas in his feature directorial debut, and with David Dastmalchian, José Zúñiga, Diana Lein, Paul Ben-Victor, and Emeraude Toubia starring. Principal photography began in mid-November 2023, in Bogotá.

== Release ==
Rosario was released in the United States on May 2, 2025.

=== Home media ===
The film was released on digital on May 21, 2025.

== Reception ==
=== Box office ===
The film release on May 2, 2025, and earned $513,232 on its first week, $807,228 on the second week and $860,815 in the third week, having a $866,466 in domestic sales, $308,270 International sales and $1,174,736 worldwide gross

=== Critical response ===
On the review aggregator website Rotten Tomatoes, 70% of 33 critics' reviews are positive. Metacritic, which uses a weighted average, assigned the film a score of 50 out of 100, based on four critics, indicating "mixed or average" reviews.

Alison Foreman of IndieWire gave the film a C+ rating and wrote, "Toubia fights hard and gets in some solid scenes that could’ve been worked out on another director’s remix. 'Rosario' is worth seeing for her and is otherwise mired in pretty good problems to have."

Maegan Navarro of Bloody Disgusting gave the film a negative review and gave a rating of 2.5 over 5 and she said; Not even the cultural specificity or inspired creature work can distract from the familiar possession horror trappings here, but it’s also an inoffensive horror effort all around.
