= Mark Roberts (film producer) =

- Citizenship: American
- Occupations: Film producer; Television producer
- Years active: 1980s–present
- Known for: Strangers with Candy, Meet Me Next Christmas; Holiday in Santa Fe; Ashley Garcia: Genius in Love

Mark Roberts is an American film and television producer. He co-founded Roberts Media in 2014 and has produced films including Strangers with Candy and Meet Me Next Christmas.

== Career ==
Roberts began his entertainment career at Universal Studios Hollywood. In 1986, he founded Enterprise Casting, an extras casting company that worked on films including The Three Amigos! (1986) and television series such as Blossom, It's a Living, and Empty Nest. In 1990, he sold Enterprise to become a producer for KWHY, a Spanish broadcast station in Los Angeles before co-founding Roberts David Films with Lorena David.

Roberts began his producing career with the independent films Plump Fiction (1997) and Poor White Trash (2000). He later produced Strangers with Candy (2005), a Sundance Film Festival selection starring Amy Sedaris.

In 2014, he co-founded Roberts Media LLC, a film and television production company. Roberts produced holiday films for Lifetime Television in collaboration with Mario Lopez, including Feliz NaviDAD (2020), Holiday in Santa Fe (2021) and Steppin' Into the Holiday (2022). He executive produced Mexico's Next Top Model (Season 5, 2014) and the Netflix series Ashley Garcia: Genius in Love (2020), a series about a Latina teen prodigy.

Roberts also produced the documentary Carlos Almaraz: Playing with Fire (2019), about Chicano artist, which premiered on Netflix. In 2024, he produced the holiday film Meet Me Next Christmas, starring Christina Milian. The film reached the top position on the Netflix global rankings with more than 18 million views.

== Selected filmography ==
=== Film and TV Movies ===
Title	Year	Type	Role
Get Him Back for Christmas	2024	TV Movie	Producer
Once Upon a Christmas Wish	2024	TV Movie	Producer
Meet Me Next Christmas	2024	Netflix Film	Producer
Steppin' Into the Holiday	2022	TV Movie	Producer
Holiday in Santa Fe	2021	TV Movie	Producer
Feliz NaviDAD	2020	TV Movie	Producer
Water & Power	2013	Feature	Producer
The Coverup	2008	Feature	Producer
Danika	2005	Feature	Producer
Strangers with Candy	2005	Feature	Producer
Extreme Dating	2004	Feature	Producer
Outta Time	2002	Feature	Producer
Poor White Trash	2000	Feature	Producer
Eastside	1999	Feature	Producer

=== Television series ===
Title	Year(s)	Episodes	Role
Ashley Garcia: Genius in Love	2020	14	Producer
Mexico's Next Top Model	2014	13	Executive Producer
The Car Chasers	2013	8	Producer
My Ride Rules	2011–2012	26	Executive Producer

=== Shorts, Documentaries ===
Title	Year	Type	Role
Love and Betrayal on the Force	2020	Documentary	Writer and Director
Carlos Almaraz: Playing with Fire	2019	Documentary	Producer
