= Megachurch Murder =

American television film

- Screenplay by: Kendall Clark
- Directed by: Darin Scott
- Starring: Tamala Jones; Shanica Knowles; Malcolm-Jamal Warner
- Music by: Sean Murray
- Country of origin: United States
- Original language: English

Production
- Producer: Ed Polgardy
- Cinematography: Thomas L. Callaway
- Editor: Charles Bornstein
- Running time: 88 minutes
- Production company: Poke Prod

Original release
- Release: February 7, 2015

Megachurch Murder is a 2015 American television film directed by Darin Scott and starring Tamala Jones, Shanica Knowles and Malcolm-Jamal Warner.

== Cast ==
- Malcolm-Jamal Warner as Hamilton Spears
- Shanica Knowles as Hannah Spears
- Tamala Jones as Martha Spears
- Michael Beach as Clay King
- Corbin Bleu as Marcus King
- Dawnn Lewis as Lucille Williams
- Santana Dempsey as Harlow Gillman
- Romeo Miller as Oliver King
- Patrick Cage as Lance King
- Nic Robuck as Bobby Stantz
