= Life-Size 2 =

2018 film directed by Steven Tsuchida

- Final promotional poster
- Also known as: Life-Size 2: A Christmas Eve
- Based on: Characters created by Stephanie Moore
- Written by: Cameron Fay; Stacey Harman
- Directed by: Steven Tsuchida
- Starring: Tyra Banks; Francia Raisa; Gavin Stenhouse; Hank Chen; Alison Fernandez; Shanica Knowles
- Composer: Germaine Franco
- Country of origin: United States
- Original language: English

Production
- Executive producers: Tyra Banks; Stephanie Allain
- Producers: Roger M. Bobb; Angi Bones
- Cinematography: Richard Vialet
- Editor: Elisa Cohen
- Running time: 81 minutes
- Production companies: Bankable Productions; Homegrown Pictures; Freeform Original Features

Original release
- Network: Freeform
- Release: December 2, 2018

Related
- Life-Size

Life-Size 2, also known as Life-Size 2: A Christmas Eve, is a 2018 American fantasy-comedy television film directed by Steven Tsuchida and starring Tyra Banks and Francia Raisa. It is the sequel to Life-Size starring Banks and Lindsay Lohan, which originally premiered in 2000 on ABC as part of The Wonderful World of Disney.

The sequel was produced by Banks, Stephanie Allain, Roger M. Bobb, and Angi Bones. It premiered during Freeform's 25 Days of Christmas, on December 2, 2018.

In February 2020, Banks revealed she was working on Life-Size 3.

== Plot ==
Grace, the young CEO of Marathon Toys, is in the middle of a quarter-life crisis as she struggles with her job. With the help of her young neighbor, Grace's old Eve doll magically awakens to help get Grace back on track.

== Cast ==
- Tyra Banks as Eve
- Francia Raisa as Grace Martin
- Gavin Stenhouse as Calum
- Hank Chen as Brendan Butler
- Alison Fernandez as Lex Roberts
- Shanica Knowles as Tahlia
- Elisa Lau as Jen Chen
- Nina Leon as Eleanor Martin
- David Shae as Devin Drake
- Michael Shenefelt as Carter
- Jene Moore as Marley
- Niland Aran as Milo
- Addison Lee as Hanna
- Rico Ball as Hyde Owens
- Yvonne Valadez as Mrs. Roberts
- Betsy Sligh as Emma
- Van Jones as the reporter
- Perez Hilton as himself
- Lil Yachty as the beatboxer
- Christian Cowan as himself

== Production ==
=== Development ===
In November 2012, it was announced that Disney Channel was developing a sequel to Life-Size. In September 2015, Tyra Banks told Hollywood Life that a script was being worked on, and hoped to have the film released around Christmas of 2016. In April 2017, it was announced that the sequel had been greenlit, for a planned debut on Freeform in December 2018.

=== Casting ===
In July 2018, it was revealed that Francia Raisa had been cast as Banks's costar, with Gavin Stenhouse, Shanica Knowles, Hank Chen, and Alison Fernandez rounding out the cast. Lindsay Lohan, who starred in the original Life-Size, was not available to shoot scenes for the film due to production conflicts with her MTV series Lindsay Lohan's Beach Club. Banks, when asked if Lohan would have any screen time in the sequel, revealed, "There's something beautiful we do with Lindsay in this movie that'll speak to die-hard fans."

=== Filming ===
The movie was entirely filmed in Atlanta, Georgia.

== Reception ==
Life-Size 2 drew 1.26 million viewers, with a 0.66 rating in adults aged 18–34. It ranked as the number one cable program in its slot in all key demos, standing as the top television movie that week and marking Freeform's first number one original movie in five years.
