= Kalen Allen =

American actor and internet personality

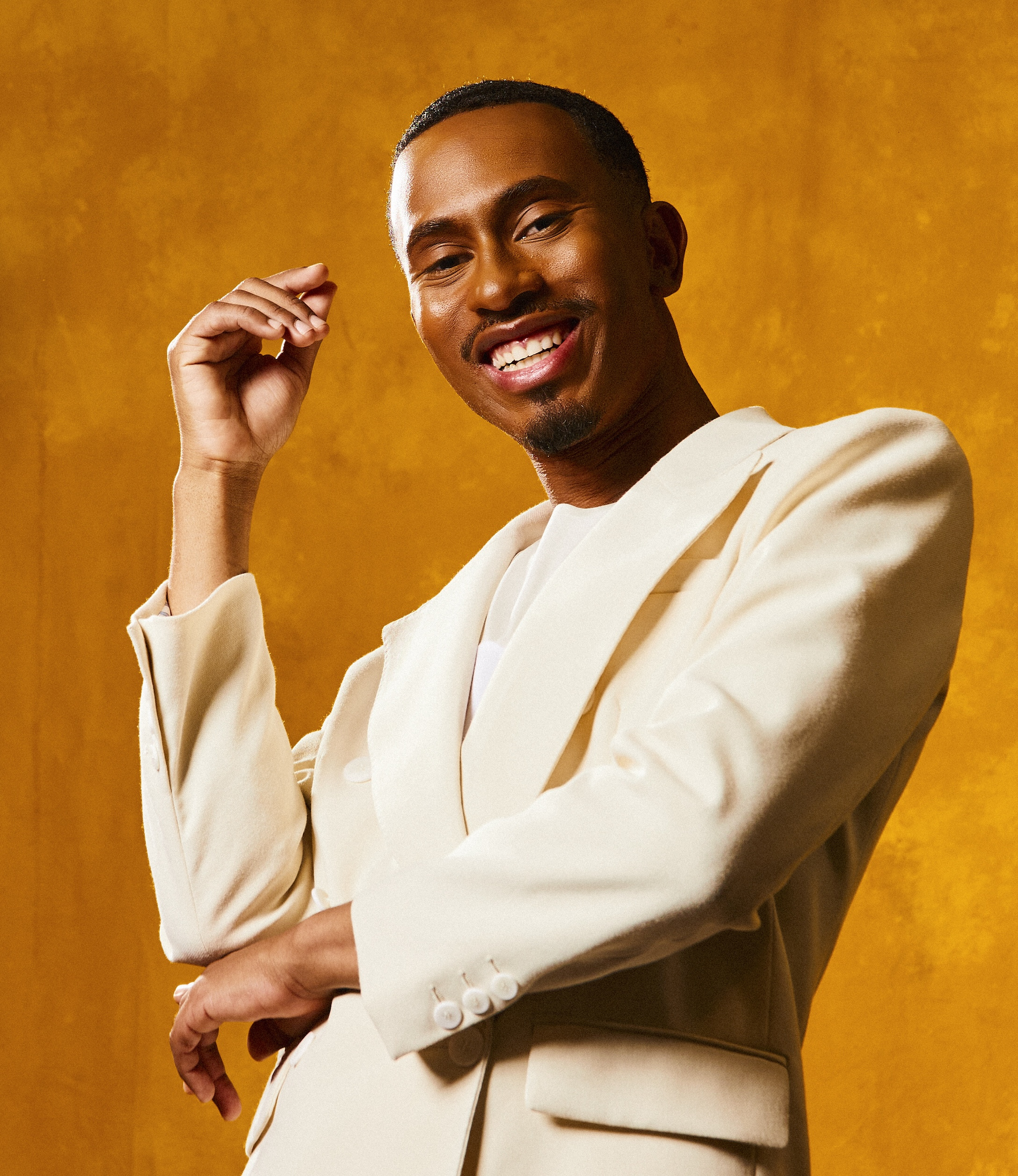
- Allen in 2024
- Born: Kansas City, Kansas, U.S.
- Education: Temple University
- Occupations: Actor; comedian; internet personality; singer

YouTube information
- Channel: TheKalenAllen
- Years active: 2017–present
- Subscribers: 862 thousand
- Views: 46.2 million
- Last updated: September 17, 2025

Kalen Allen is an American actor, comedian, and internet personality who gained widespread recognition and fame through his viral food reaction videos. His social media popularity led to regular appearances on The Ellen DeGeneres Show. He subsequently appeared on the 2020 film An American Pickle, the Amazon Prime series With Love, HBO Max's A Black Lady Sketch Show, and the Netflix film, Meet Me Next Christmas. Kalen starred in Elf, The Musical on Broadway, in the role of Store Manager, for the Christmas season.

== Early life and education ==
Kalen Allen was born and grew up in Kansas City, Kansas. He attended Sumner Academy of Arts & Science, a high school in Kansas City. He subsequently went to Temple University where he majored in film, theater, and media arts. Using Temple University's Los Angeles Study Away program, he graduated in 2018 soon after his rise in popularity. As of 2022, Allen is enrolled in a master's in journalism program at New York University.

== Career ==
In 2017, while still a college student, Allen stumbled upon a video tutorial for a peculiar dish called 7-Up Salad. The recipe consisted of soda, marshmallows, lime Jell-O, cream cheese, and other unlikely ingredients. Intrigued by the absurdity of the recipe, Allen recorded his reaction and posted it on social media, adding humorous commentary. The video went viral.

Allen started the YouTube channel Kalen Reacts, which primarily featured him reacting to other bizarre and unconventional videos of people making food with unusual recipes. He posted his first Kalen Reacts video in November 2017. But these videos quickly gained traction, garnering millions of views and attracting widespread attention. Ellen DeGeneres took notice of them and expressed her admiration on her talk show, The Ellen DeGeneres Show, in an episode that aired on December 7, 2017. She invited him to appear on her show and later also offered him a job opportunity. During his appearance on January 2, 2018, Allen was officially hired to create reaction videos for the show.

Allen won a Webby Award in 2020 for OMKalen. He made his film acting debut the same year in An American Pickle starring Seth Rogen. The film's plot revolves around a man who falls into a vat of pickles in 1918, is preserved, and reemerges in present-day Brooklyn. Allen plays one half of a Brooklyn gay couple who help the man establish a successful pickle business. In November 2020, Allen released debut album For Christmas Sake!

In 2021, Allen became a judge on Cakealikes which aired on Food Network and the streaming service Discovery+. In 2022, he was also a judge on the network's Supermarket Stakeout. Allen also hosted Buddy vs Duff, a competition between Buddy Valastro and Duff Goldman. He has appeared in episodes the Amazon Prime series With Love. and HBO Max's A Black Lady Sketch Show. In September 2022, Allen began co-hosting Raised by Ricki, a podcast with Ricki Lake. At the end of 2022, Allen became a judge, along with Stephanie Boswell and Carla Hall, on Food Network's Holiday Baking Championship: Gingerbread Showdown, a spin off of Holiday Baking Championship.

In 2023, Allen hosted the year's GLSEN Respect Awards.

== Personal life ==
Allen is openly gay.

== Filmography ==
=== Television ===
Year	Title	Role	Refs.
2018–2021	The Ellen DeGeneres Show	Guest contributor	
2021–2023	With Love	Cyn	
2021	Cakealikes	Panel judge	
2022	Buddy vs Duff	Host	
2022	Snack on This	Host	
2022	Supermarket Stakeout	Judge	
2022	A Black Lady Sketch Show	Arms dealer	
2022–2023	Holiday Baking Championship: Gingerbread Showdown	Judge	

=== Film ===
Year	Title	Role	Refs.
2020	An American Pickle	Kevin	
2020	For Christmas Sake: The Movie Musical	Kokoa Klaus	
2024	Meet Me Next Christmas	Jordy	

== Discography ==
Year	Title	Refs.
2020	For Christmas Sake!	
2024	Christmas Memories	
