= Life-Size =

2000 film by Mark Rosman

- DVD cover
- Written by: Mark Rosman; Stephanie Moore
- Story by: Stephanie Moore
- Directed by: Mark Rosman
- Starring: Lindsay Lohan; Jere Burns; Ann Marie Loder; Garwin Sanford; Tom Butler; Tyra Banks
- Composer: Eric Colvin
- Country of origin: United States
- Original language: English

Production
- Producer: Fitch Cady
- Cinematography: Philip Linzey
- Editor: Bonnie Koehler
- Running time: 88 minutes
- Production companies: Walt Disney Television; Pacific Motion Pictures

Original release
- Network: ABC
- Release: March 5, 2000

Related
- Life-Size 2: A Christmas Eve

Life-Size is a 2000 American fantasy comedy television film directed by Mark Rosman and starring Lindsay Lohan and Tyra Banks. It premiered on March 5, 2000, on ABC as part of The Wonderful World of Disney block. Lohan portrays a young girl who casts a magic spell to bring back her deceased mother and, instead, accidentally brings to life her fashion doll, played by Banks. The film then follows their relationship as the doll creates havoc while trying to fit into the real world.

Life-Size was popular among its demographic, developing a cult following that frequently revisited and reexamined it in the years following its release, and generated a sequel 18 years after the original broadcast. It is considered a didactic children's film that set the tone for doll-inspired movies and is perceived by many fans as "the first live-action Barbie movie" due to the similarities between the two dolls despite not having the rights to the official character. The film made its streaming debut on Disney+ in November 2025, after previously never having been available through digital platforms.

The sequel, titled Life-Size 2: A Christmas Eve, premiered on December 2, 2018 on Freeform with Banks reprising her role. In 2020, Banks announced another sequel was in the works.

== Plot ==
Casey Stuart is a tomboyish girl who is the quarterback of her school's 7th-grade football team. After the passing of her mother, Casey has become withdrawn from old friends, and her widowed father, Ben, has been focused on his work at his law firm and missing her football games. Casey, determined to resurrect her mother, finds a book called "The Book of Awakenings" at a local bookstore. The book contains instructions on how to resurrect the dead and states that a successful resurrection will become permanent unless it is undone before sunset on the fourth day after it begins.

Following the book's instructions, Casey collects artifacts from her mother's life, including locks of her hair in her hairbrush. However, the resurrection is unwittingly sabotaged when Drew McDonald, Ben's co-worker who has a crush on Ben, gives Casey an Eve doll, a plastic fashion doll in the form of a young pretty woman, manufactured by Marathon Toys. Eve is stated to have many add-on accessories, including outfits appropriate to taxing careers such as law enforcement, medicine and outer space, and lives in Sunnyvale, "in the middle of America". Drew discovers the Eve doll soon discarded by Casey and uses the hairbrush to brush the doll's hair. With strands from Casey's Eve doll remaining on the brush as Casey utters the incantation, the magic acts on her doll rather than her mother, and Casey wakes up the next morning to find Eve in bed with her in full-size human form. Casey is upset by this, but Eve is excited about being a real woman.

Casey begins to look for the second volume of the book with instructions on how to undo the resurrection downtown but sees that she has to wait for it to arrive to the store. Leaving the store, she accidentally falls onto the street. Eve steps in front of the truck, using her police training to stop it, as Ben discovers Casey's whereabouts. Thankful that Eve saved his daughter, he asks how he can repay Eve. After Eve tells him she is from out-of-town and does not have any possessions nor a place to stay, Ben helps her buy her new clothes and lets her stay at their house. When Eve mentions that she has had numerous jobs including working as a doctor, police officer, and secretary, Ben hires her as a temp at the firm. She tries to do secretarial work and fails, but helps boost the morale of Ben's coworker, Ellen. She is then invited to a corporate event where she sings her theme song on stage, much to everyone's enjoyment.

During this time, tension builds between Casey and her father, which is further increased by Ben's attraction to Eve, which Casey resents as a betrayal to her mother. However, as Eve helps Casey with her self-confidence and coping with the loss of her mother, they gradually become friends. By the time the second volume of the magic book arrives at the bookstore, Casey has decided she likes Eve, so she does not buy it. Unfortunately, Eve has been getting homesick and becomes aware that her doll collection is now at risk of getting cancelled due to declining sales.

Discouraged by her difficulties in the real world, Eve decides to undo the spell herself to save her doll line. After buying the second volume of the book and saying goodbye to Ben at Casey's championship game, she goes to Sunnyvale, a specially decorated room at Marathon headquarters, and recites the incantation. When Casey and Ben arrive, she tearfully bids them farewell and turns back into a doll. Sometime later, with the lessons learned from her experiences in the real world, Eve becomes a popular toy again. Casey reconnects with her friends, Ben is promoted at work and Drew takes him to lunch.

The film ends with the cast dancing to Eve's theme song ("Be a Star"), with an apparently still-real Eve singing and dancing along.

== Cast ==
- Tyra Banks as Eve
  - Banks also voices Eve in her talking doll form. She says her phrases “I’m Eve, and I’m your special friend” and “Let’s go to the mall!”.
- Lindsay Lohan as Casey Stuart
- Jere Burns as Ben Stuart
- Anne Marie Loder as Drew McDonald
- Garwin Sanford as Richie Ackerman
- Tom Butler as Phil
- Jillian Fargey as Ellen
- Dee Jay Jackson as Coach
- Corrine Koslo as Toy store owner
- Alfred Humphreys as Bookstore owner
- Kerry Sandomirsky as Ms. Phyllis Weiner
- Ryan DeBoer as Bruce Weiner
- Sam MacMillan as Sam
- Katelyn Wallace as Sarah
- Shaina Tianne Unger as Jessica
- Jessica Lee Owens as Shannon
- Chantal Strand as Sarah's sister
- Alvin Sanders as Guard
- Campbell Lane as Judge Peterman
- Garvin Cross as Truck driver

== Production ==
The film was made-for-television. Lohan was given the role of Casey Stuart following her successful film debut in The Parent Trap (1998) as a part of a three-picture contract with The Walt Disney Company. Banks was given the role of Eve, the doll that is magically transformed into a live woman during Casey's attempt to bring her mother back to life. Costume designer Maya Mani said, "It was a joy to work with Tyra because she knows how to wear clothes. No matter what we put on her, she could carry it off." Lohan and Banks were paired for a screen test at the Plaza Hotel in New York City before production started. Lohan's siblings Michael, Aliana and Dakota appear in uncredited cameos cheering in the football stands. Stephanie Moore came up with the idea of a doll coming to life and collaborated with the director, Mark Rosman, on the script for the film. ABC was very interested in acquiring the project, but Disney asked for a rewrite of the original ending which saw Eve becoming a human and marrying Casey's father.

Pre-production began in the summer of 1999 and filming began in October 1999, taking place for three weeks in Vancouver, British Columbia. British Columbia flags remained on the license plate of Casey's father Ben, but the province text is replaced with "Evergreen State" for the movie. The toy store used in the film is called Kaboodles, which is the real store's name located in Point Grey. The commercial for the Eve doll at the beginning of the film was created with production designer David Fischer deliberately going for a Jetsons-inspired 1950s retro look. Life-Size was slated to premiere as a part of ABC's The Wonderful World of Disney on February 27, 2000, but was delayed by one week, and later released on March 5.

Rosman talked about the movie in various interviews in the early 2020s, revealing the original script was called Ken and Barbie before Disney bought it. Out of concern that Mattel wouldn't sign off on lending the rights to Barbie, the duo avoided mentioning the doll in subsequent drafts of the script. He also looked back on working with the lead stars: "It was a big hit on the Disney Channel. [Lindsay] was fantastic, this was like her next thing [after The Parent Trap] and [Tyra Banks] had never really acted before and she ended up being really great, so that was fun, a lot of fun. [...] I was nervous because Tyra [Banks] was obviously, you know, new to acting. We had Lindsay, and the amazing thing was, [Tyra] just jumped off the screen! The connection between her and Lindsay was fantastic." Although the director initially had concerns about her casting, Banks was "able to really embody the character" after she suggested to dress up in character during rehearsals. He added, "We ended up having the chance to do some rehearsal with [Tyra] in the weeks before we were shooting, which was very rare for TV movies on those schedules, but she was willing to do it, and then I got the two of them together and they were just sort of a magical pair!"

== Music ==
Mark Rosman and George Blondheim wrote a song titled "Be a Star" to be used as the theme song for the movie. Eve sings the track during a business party scene and it is also reprised in a dance scene with the rest of the cast shown at the end of the film. Rosman recalled making the song: "We needed a theme song for the toy [the doll] and there was a guy that we had hired in Vancouver, where we shot, to be kind of the band leader, because there was a scene where they had this band that was gonna play this song. He wrote the music, I wrote the lyrics literally in the back of an envelope kind of thing, and we put it together... and here I am, it's the only song I've ever written but I'm proud of it, it was fun!" He stated "I wanted it to be something where you could really stand up and cheer," and continued about filming the scene which he called an "unrehearsed accident" that happened when they were about to wrap and had just finished shooting what was intended to be the last scene:

What was really fun about it was the cast completely got into that song while we were shooting, and we had like 15 minutes left in our day before we had to call it quits, and I said 'hey, everybody let's do the song,' and Lindsay was like 'yeah! let's do the song! let's do the song!' and so was Tyra, and so we did it, and everybody there, you know, Jere [Burns] who played the father [...] they all knew the moves and everything. We had two cameras, and we just said go. [...] It was hysterical, and that became the ending of our movie.

Rosman also revealed part of the reason why the theme song was called "Be a Star" was because the doll was originally named Star in the script, but the filmmakers were legally required to change it due to copyright issues as toy companies were developing a doll with the same name. Two songs by the Irish girl group B*Witched were used in the film: "C'est la Vie" and "Rollercoaster". A song from American girl group Nobody's Angel's debut album, "Keep Me Away", was used near the end of the film.

== Reception and legacy ==
Life-Size was a hit with its target demographic, and became a "sleepover rewatch staple". It has been called a cult classic with fans frequently revisiting it in the years following its release and sharing their thoughts online. Mark Rosman named Life-Size as the film he directed that gets the most fan reaction and expressed it was his most memorable filming experience as well: "Lindsay [Lohan] was just absolutely delightful, she was super excited to do the movie and to be working with Tyra Banks, and then Tyra, this was her maybe second, if not first, real role as an actress, certainly her first where she really carries the movie [...] It was just really fun!" He recounts:

People really responded to it. I get young women in their early 20s coming up to me, when they've heard that I directed that movie, and they actually start singing to me the theme song [for the toy doll], it's hysterical. It really touched a lot of people.

Collider contributor Kendall Myers called it "the best Barbie movie," even if the doll isn't technically in it due to the absence of its official rights, but "the audience sees Eve and instantly thinks of Barbie." Listing all the similarities between the dolls, the writer states that the film "handles difficult subject matter and allows Eve to ask deep questions about what it means to be human," adding that the story addresses themes such as femininity, grief and self-discovery, which results in a "deeper film than the plot may suggest." It is noted that, until the release of Barbie (2023), it was the only film that allowed the doll to be human, as the portrayal of Eve is forced to grow and evolve, with Banks being credited for her performance making the character more dynamic and relatable than other representations of Barbie. Myers states that Eve's decision to become a doll again at the end of the movie also makes it memorable and relevant as she does so "to better accomplish her purpose of helping girls," and determines that Life-Size acknowledges "the problematic parts of Barbie and attempts to change them in a way no other Barbie film has done." Lauren Piester of E! reevaluated the movie, claiming, "we were not ready for the movie we actually got — an unexpectedly funny and sweet movie that was also a lot more feminist than we remembered it being." Screen Rant's Dalton Norman ranked it as one of Lohan's best movies, opining: "Lohan delivered a compelling performance that spoke to the deeper meaning behind the film's odd story."

Writing for the HuffPost, Ruth Etiesit Samuel similarly expressed that Life-Size "made the first attempt at merging a plastic world with the real one, using nostalgic whimsy as a vehicle for self-discovery and introspection," and tackled the "criticism that Barbie has weathered for years over Mattel's depiction of girlhood head-on," describing it as the "personification of many young girls' wildest dreams" from the clothing to the activities depicted in the film. While revisiting Life-Size, certain gender and racial subjects being normalized background details also made it be considered progressive for its era. The casting of Banks was examined and seen as important, as "it felt significant seeing a Black doll, albeit fictional, lauded as a cultural mainstay, depicted by a supermodel and broadcast by a household network such as ABC." Around the release of the first official live-action Barbie movie in July 2023, Banks shared a throwback of the Eve character on Instagram, generating more buzz among fans online who referred to her as the "original Barbie". Liz Arcury of The Daily Beast drew comparisons between Life-Size and Barbie, saying that they "share more in common than having a doll as the lead. Both [of these films] center girlhood, role models, and humanity in a way that is truly moving, while simultaneously poking fun at capitalism and its excesses." The evolution of Eve and Casey's relationship is highlighted as creating effective emotional scenes as it "emphasizes that the natural emotional vulnerability in women is something to be proud of." Alexandre Marain of Vogue France stated the movie "does not seem to have aged one bit over the years" thanks to "Banks, perfect in the role of the animated doll", "a plethora of hilarious comedic lines", and "a series of well-crafted emotional moments," detailing it as "an insightful critique of Barbie, particularly the issues surrounding her being 'perfect' and 'gifted', and raises deep questions about what it means to be human, and about a woman's place."

Rosman was interviewed following the release of the Barbie movie and the comparisons that gave Life-Size a "second life on social media": "I'm getting a kick out of it. Barbie has so many different aspects to what she represents culturally and socially, and for girls, it doesn't surprise me that it's come back." A screening of the film was presented by Gerber/Hart at the Leather Archives & Museum as part of a Barbie exhibit opening in Chicago in August 2023. That same month, Vogue listed Banks as one of their 20 favorite performances by models in movies. It was observed the film had yet to come to streaming as of August 2023. In August 2025, Lohan and Banks celebrated the film's 25th anniversary by reuniting at the Australian premiere of Lohan's Disney sequel Freakier Friday.

== Home media ==
The film was released on VHS and DVD on May 30, 2000. It has never been available for purchase or rental on digital release services, such as Amazon Instant Video or Apple TV. On October 15, 2025, it was announced that Life-Size would be released on the streaming service Disney+ on November 7, 2025, which it subsequently was with a new HD widescreen remaster.

== Sequels ==
A sequel to the movie was first reported in November 2012. In January 2014, Disney Channel announced that they were working on a sequel to Life-Size titled Life-Size 2, with Tyra Banks reprising the role of Eve. In March 2015, Banks tweeted that they were still working on the script. In September 2015, Banks said: "We have gotten many drafts of scripts, and the one thing I can say is that to the Disney Channel executives, Life-Size is so precious. It's like their baby, so they just want it perfect. They keep redoing it, and redoing it, and redoing the script, and we are in another round of redos, and we're hoping for Christmas 2016." Banks once again announced her involvement with the film during an interview with Variety in December 2015: "There is no one else that can play Eve but me, thank you very much! I'm just joking with you, but yes, I am going to be Eve."

In April 2017, it was announced the film would debut on Freeform in December 2018. Banks stated in a January 2018 interview that the script was almost finished, and that production was expected to start in the summer of 2018. In July, Francia Raisa was confirmed to star. Lohan was set to reprise her character but scheduling conflicts with her MTV show prevented her from filming in America. However, Banks assured Lohan would "be in the movie in some kind of way." In mid-November 2018, it was announced that Life-Size 2 would debut on December 2, 2018.

In February 2020, Banks revealed she was working on Life-Size 3. In October 2022, the possible sequel was also brought up while Banks hosted Dancing with the Stars on Disney+. In August 2024, Banks teased its development and Lohan's potential return. In October 2024, Banks revealed that her pitch would follow Lohan's character Casey accidentally turning into a doll. In February 2025, Banks added, "I want another Black girl for the third one. I was talking to somebody very famous recently, about her starring in it." In October 2026, Banks stated she would be pitching a "massive idea" to Disney and that she envisioned a theatrical release for the project.
