= Eliot Glazer =

American comedian and writer (born 1982 or 1983)

- Born: 1982 or 1983 (age 43–44); New York, U.S.
- Education: New York University
- Occupations: Comedian; writer; actor
- Years active: 2009–present
- Family: Ilana Glazer (sister)

Eliot Glazer (born 1982 or 1983) is an American comedian, writer, actor, television producer, and blogger. He wrote, creative consulted, and had a recurring role as Eliot Wexler on the Comedy Central series Broad City (2015–2019), which was created by and starred his sister, Ilana Glazer. He also worked as a story editor on the comedy series Younger and New Girl and created and starred in the web series It Gets Betterish (2011–2012) and Eliot's Sketchpad (2013).

Outside of television, he created the Tumblr blog My Parents Were Awesome in 2009, which was adapted into a book of essays by Random House in 2010. He also started Haunting Renditions, a live show in which he performed orchestral renditions of maligned pop songs, in 2014.

== Early life ==
Glazer was born in New York to a Reform Jewish family and raised in St. James, New York. His father, Laurence, hails from Flatbush in Brooklyn, while his mother is from Jamaica in Queens. The two met at University of Massachusetts Amherst's Hillel chapter. As a child, he filmed skits together with his sister, Ilana, who later went on to create and star in the Comedy Central series Broad City. He attended New York University, where he originally studied to be an opera singer before transferring to the Gallatin School of Individualized Study and performed in the school's a capella group. He also performed improvisational comedy with the Upright Citizens Brigade alongside Ilana.

== Career ==
While working as an Internet culture blogger for Urlesque, Glazer started the Tumblr photoblog My Parents Were Awesome in 2009, which showcased user-submitted photos of people's parents being "cool" before they became parents. It was later adapted into a book of essays that was published by Random House in 2010. In 2012, he and comedian Brent Sullivan created, wrote, and starred in the satirical web series It Gets Betterish, which depicts the two attempting to live as stereotypical gay men. Both were included on Out's Out100 list for 2012 due to the web series, which the magazine described as "absurd and boisterous", while The New York Times wrote that it was "elegantly made" and "very funny".

By 2012, Glazer worked as an assistant editor for New York's entertainment blog, Vulture. He and Ilana uploaded their YouTube skit "Shit New Yorkers Say", a spin on the "Shit Girls Say" meme, in January 2012. It had four million views by 2013. His Above Average web series Eliot's Sketchpad premiered in January 2013. In its first episode, he played Oprah Winfrey recreating viral videos. Its skit Homeland: The Musical, a parody of the Showtime series Homeland depicting it as a Broadway musical, premiered in September 2013. He appeared in a video for Vice Media's food section Munchies in December 2014, in which he made Hanukkah gelt.

In 2014, Glazer adapted his web series, Haunting Renditions—in which he performed unpopular pop songs as ballads backed by an orchestra—into a New York City–based live cabaret show. By 2015, he was working as a story editor on the TV Land series Younger and as a creative consultant and writer on Broad City, on which he also had a recurring role as Eliot Wexler, the brother of Ilana's character, Ilana Wexler. He also worked as a consultant on the Hulu series Difficult People and appeared in the Hulu series Deadbeat. He signed with WME in 2015. In 2017, he worked as a writer and executive story editor on the Fox series New Girl.

Glazer made his film acting debut in the 2020 HBO Max film An American Pickle as Christian, a hipster from Brooklyn who discovers and advertises a new pickle. The Comedy Central Digital series 2 Jews Choose, in which Glazer and a Jewish guest discuss which of two things are Jewish or "goyish", premiered in May 2022. He also worked on the Paramount+ series iCarly from 2022 to 2023. With Ilana, he co-wrote an episode of the Amazon Prime Video animated anthology miniseries The Boys Presents: Diabolical, "Boyd in 3D", which premiered in March 2022. In it, he voices the lead character, Boyd, an unconfident dog-walker who, after taking a serum that makes him handsome, becomes social media famous.

== Personal life ==
In 2012, Glazer lived in Ditmas Park in Brooklyn. By 2017, he was based in Los Angeles. He is openly gay.

In December 2017, his post criticizing a billboard advertising the gay hookup platform Squirt.org received backlash on social media, as users considered it to be slut-shaming.

== Filmography ==
=== Television ===
Year	Title	Role	Notes
2010–2011	Broad City	Eliot	Web series
2011	The Chris Gethard Show	Self	Episode: "Sibling Rivalry"
2012	It Gets Betterish	Eliot	Also creator and writer 10 episodes
2013	Eliot's Sketchpad	Various roles	Web series; also creator and writer
2015	Deadbeat	Sean	
2015–2016	Younger	—N/a	Story editor and writer
2015–2019	Broad City	Eliot Wexler	Recurring role; 9 episodes Also consulting producer and writer ("Along Came Molly")
2016	Time Traveling Bong	Jojo	Episode: "Chapter 3: The End...?"
2016–2017	New Girl	—N/a	Executive story editor and writer; 22 episodes
2018	Teachers	—N/a	Writer; 2 episodes
2021	Liza on Demand	Leonard	Episode: "Truthousand"; Also writer ("Wizard of Esme") and executive producer (4 episodes)
2022	The Boys Presents: Diabolical	Boyd Doone	Episode: "Boyd in 3D"; Also writer
2022–2023	iCarly	—N/a	Co-executive producer (6 episodes) and writer (2 episodes)

=== Film ===
Year	Title	Role
2020	An American Pickle	Christian
2022	The People's Joker	Lil Timmy Too Times
