= OneWheaton =

American LGBT organization

OneWheaton is a group of Wheaton College alumni that formed in 2011 to provide support for LGBT, queer and questioning students at the evangelical Christian college.

== Overview ==
OneWheaton claims that its purpose is to provide support to lesbian, gay, bisexual, transgender, queer and questioning students and alumni at Wheaton and other colleges. Its goal is not to change Wheaton College's policies prohibiting homosexual acts or to stand against those people who choose lifelong celibacy as their personal path of reconciling their faith and sexuality. The group does not propose any theological grounds or defense of its position as it is a diverse group consisting of people who hold many different perspectives. However, the group is unified by their shared belief that the classification of homosexuality as "sinful" is not only incorrect, but damaging. OneWheaton notes on its website that the group is not "affiliated or condoned by Wheaton College".

OneWheaton has over 700 members, including alumni who are allies in support of their mission as well as alumni who identify as lesbian, gay, bisexual, transgender and queer. Supporters range from those who graduated in 1954 to the present.

The founding board members of OneWheaton were: Hank Chen, Jessica Friesen, Adam Hibma, Sue Nordlof, Catherine Latimer, Frances Motiwalla, Susan Schmalzbauer, Costa Tsiatsos, José Vilanova, Ruth Wardschenk, Hillary Waters, Lora Wiens, and Kristin Winn.

== History ==
OneWheaton first organized in response to Wheaton College's chapel series titled "Sexuality and Wholeness"—which included a message stating that following Jesus and living in a same-sex relationship are incompatible goals—and the seminar "Same-Sex Marriage Affects Everyone"—which hypothesized that allowing same-sex marriage would lead to families abandoning their children, men having test tube babies for the purpose of molesting them, and ultimately, the end of "what was once a great civilization".

On April 29, 2011, members of the group distributed a letter to students on campus sharing their opinion that "sexual identity is not a tragic sign of the sinful nature of the world" and affirming "the full humanity and dignity of every human being regardless of their sexual orientation or gender identity". That same day, Wheaton College President Philip Ryken responded to the letter by sending an internal email to the students, faculty, and staff of the college. The email indicated that the administrations sees "each member of the human family as created in the image of God himself" but that "scripture condemns...homosexual behavior and all other sexual relations outside the bounds of marriage between a man and woman". Ryken's response references the Community Covenant, which stipulates that homosexual behavior is not allowed at the school.

The group and its members became the subject of the documentary Queers in the Kingdom: Let Your Light Shine by filmmaker and Wheaton College alumnus Markie Hancock. The documentary was released in 2014 and screened nationally at film festivals and college campuses.

Also in 2015, OneWheaton received a $5000 grant from the Crosswicks Foundation, which was founded by the late Madeleine L'Engle and her husband, Hugh Franklin.

== Reception ==
According to OneWheaton spokesperson Kristin Winn, the group was "floored by the [positive] response", with their website crashing on the second day of its launch. Mike Clawson, Christian contributor for the website "The Friendly Atheist" and an alumnus of Wheaton College, voiced his support for the group's efforts, noting that the group "has already succeeded in letting current LGBTQ students there know that they are not alone". The blog Queerty expressed its support for the students, equating President Ryken's emailed letter to students as supporting the tormenting or bullying of human beings.
