= Holiday in Santa Fe =

2021 film directed by Jody Margolin Hahn

- Genre: Romantic comedy
- Written by: Cristela Alonzo
- Directed by: Jody Margolin Hahn
- Starring: Mario Lopez; Emeraude Toubia; Aimee Garcia; Gia Lopez; Efrain Figueroa; Hank Chen
- Music by: Dara Taylor
- Country of origin: United States
- Original languages: English; Spanish

Production
- Executive producer: Mario Lopez
- Producer: Mark Roberts
- Cinematography: Ryan Galvan
- Editor: Rob Pallatina
- Running time: 81 minutes
- Production companies: ViaMar Productions; Roberts Media LLC

Original release
- Network: Lifetime
- Release: December 10, 2021

Holiday In Santa Fe is a 2021 American Christmas romantic comedy television film directed by Jody Margolin Hahn (in her feature directorial debut), written by Cristela Alonzo, and starring Mario Lopez and Emeraude Toubia. It was originally broadcast on Lifetime on December 10, 2021 as part of the network's "It's a Wonderful Lifetime" holiday movie slate.

== Plot ==
Belinda Sawyer, an executive at one of the largest greeting card and holiday décor chains in Chicago arrives in Santa Fe, New Mexico to seize the opportunity to acquire Casa de Milagro, a family-owned business that makes holiday ornaments and décor inspired by Mexican Christmas traditions. Their award-winning designs, created by matriarch Milagro Ortega, are highly sought-after each holiday season. With help from their father, siblings Tony and Magdalena have run the store in Santa Fe all their lives. But when their beloved Milagro unexpectedly dies, the family struggles to find its heart. As sparks fly between Belinda and Tony, Belinda realizes there is more to Casa de Milagro than meets the eye.

== Cast ==
- Mario Lopez as Tony Ortega
- Emeraude Toubia as Belinda Sawyer
- Aimee Garcia as Magdalena Ortega
- Gia Lopez as Frankie Ortega
- Efrain Figueroa as Jose Ortega
- Hank Chen as Kevin
- GiGi Erneta as Jennifer Sawyer
- Scott Evans as Matt
- Don Most as Mr. Rogers

== Production ==
=== Development ===
This marked Lopez's third project with Lifetime Channel, given the green light following their first two successful outings, Feliz NavivDAD and KFC sponsored short film (branded as a "mini-movie"), A Recipe for Seduction. It was one of four pitches made to the network in 2021.

The film is Emeraude Toubia's first executive producer credit and led to her production company, The Emerald Co., to be signed with United Talent Agency.

=== Filming ===
The movie was filmed entirely in Santa Fe, New Mexico in spring 2021.

Toubia coincidentally shot Holiday in Santa Fe and Amazon Prime Video's holiday series, With Love back to back. Both Christmas-themed projects were released December 2021 with Toubia declared as "The New Queen of Christmas" by Variety.
