= Dara Taylor =

American film music composer

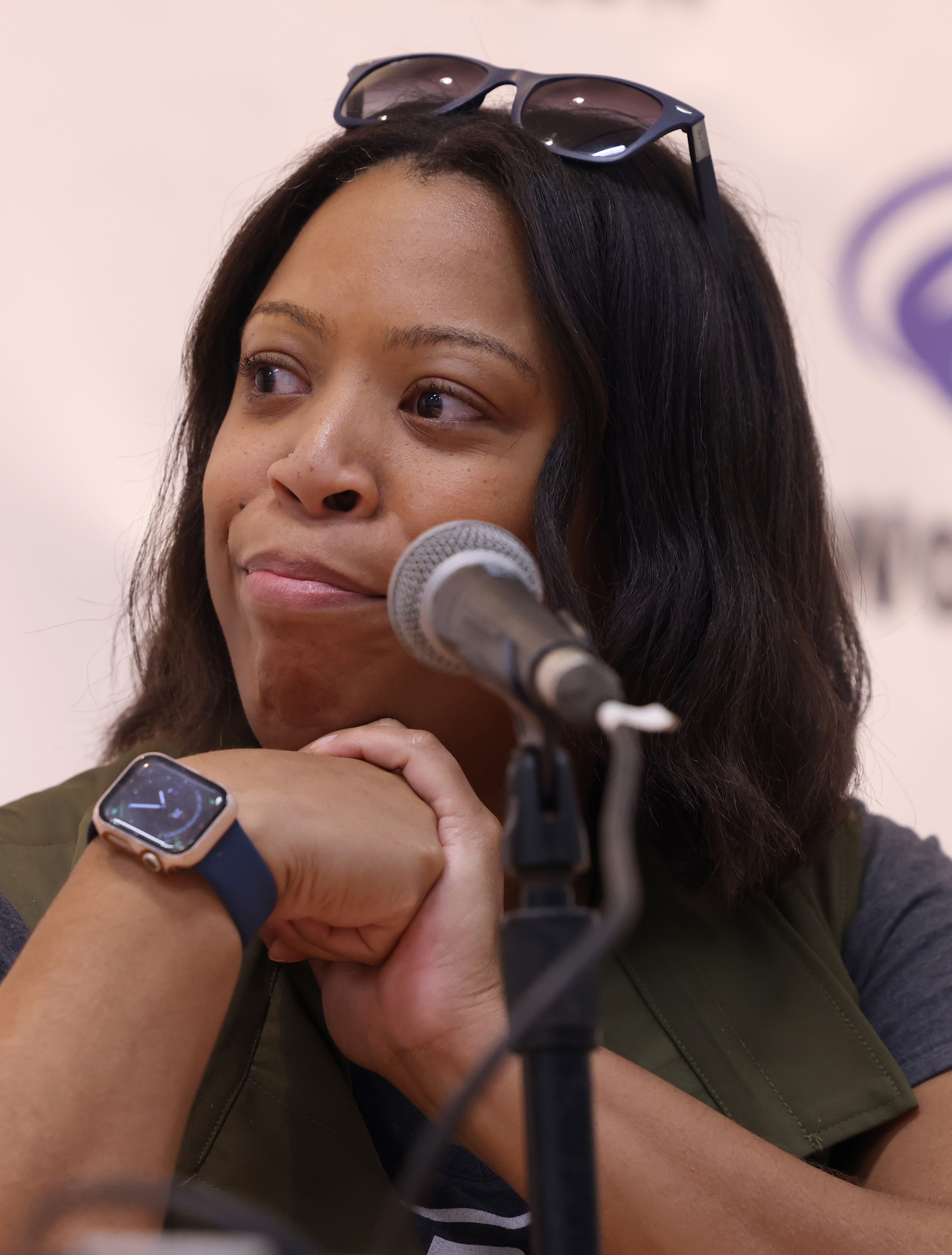
- Taylor at the 2025 WonderCon

Background information
- Genres: Film and television scores, electronic, jazz
- Occupation: Film composer
- Instruments: Piano, keyboards, synthesizer
- Years active: 2014-present
- Website: www.darataylor.com//

Dara Taylor is an American composer for film and television. A Hollywood Music in Media Awards nominated composer, she has worked on a range of independent and studio productions across genres including drama, comedy, and thriller. She is a frequent collaborator of Christopher Lennertz, contributing additional music and score production to projects including Agent Carter, Galavant and Child Genius, as well as films such as Bad Moms, Baywatch, Smurfs: The Lost Village, and Sausage Party. Taylor has composed original scores for films including The Invitation (2022), The Noel Diary (2022), and Strays (2023). In 2015, she was nominated for a Hollywood Music in Media Award for her score for Undetectable.

== Early life and education ==
Taylor was born in Poughkeepsie, New York, and raised primarily in Lockport, New York. She grew up in a musical household and participated in church choirs and school music programs.

She attended Cornell University, where she studied music and psychology, graduating cum laude in 2009. While at Cornell, she studied voice and composition, including work with Zachary Wadsworth and Steven Stucky. She later earned a Master of Music in Film Composition from New York University in 2011.

== Career ==
After completing her studies, Taylor relocated to Los Angeles to pursue a career in film scoring. She worked in music production roles early in her career and became a longtime collaborator of Christopher Lennertz, contributing to film and television projects including Lost in Space, The Happytime Murders, UglyDolls, and Supernatural.

In 2018, she was selected as a fellow for the Sundance Institute Composers Lab, and in 2019 she participated in the Lionel Newman Conducting Fellowship. In 2021, she was selected for the Universal Composers Initiative.

Taylor has composed scores for a variety of film and television projects, including Echo Boomers (2020), the FX documentary series Pride (2021), and films such as The Tender Bar (2021) and The Invitation (2022).

Her work blends orchestral and electronic elements.

She is a member of several industry organizations, including the Recording Academy, the Television Academy, and the Society of Composers & Lyricists .

== Filmography ==
=== Short films ===
- For Gunther's Eyes Only (2022)

=== Films ===
- Colewell (2019)
- Echo Boomers (2020)
- Barb and Star Go to Vista Del Mar (2021)
- Binti (2021)
- The Tender Bar (2021)
- American Refugee (2021)
- Holiday in Santa Fe (2021)
- The Invitation (2022)
- The Noel Diary (2022)
- Strays (2023)
- Black Barbie: A Documentary (2023)
- Meet Me Next Christmas (2024)
- Straw (2025)
- The Dink (2026)
- Spaceballs: The New One (2027)
- Scoob! Holiday Haunt (unreleased)

=== Television ===
- Trial by Media (2020)
- Bookmarks (2020)
- Bite Size Halloween (2020)
- Holiday in Santa Fe (2021)
- High Heel (2021)
- Little Ellen (2021-2022)
- The Boys Presents: Diabolical (2022)
- 37 Words (2022)
- Ironheart (2025)

== Awards and recognition ==
- Hollywood Music in Media Award nomination for Undetectable (2015)
