= The Angriest Man in Brooklyn =

2014 film directed by Phil Alden

- Theatrical release poster
- Directed by: Phil Alden Robinson
- Written by: Daniel Taplitz
- Based on: The 92 Minutes of Mr. Baum by Assi Dayan
- Produced by: Bob Cooper; Daniel J. Walker; Tyler Mitchell
- Starring: Robin Williams; Mila Kunis; Peter Dinklage; Melissa Leo
- Narrated by: Robin Williams
- Cinematography: John Bailey
- Edited by: Mark Yoshikawa
- Music by: Mateo Messina
- Production companies: MICA Entertainment, LLC; Films de Force Majeure; Landscape Entertainment; Prominent Media Group; Vedette Finance
- Distributed by: Lionsgate
- Release date: May 23, 2014
- Running time: 84 minutes
- Country: United States
- Language: English
- Box office: $615,198

The Angriest Man in Brooklyn is a 2014 American comedy-drama film directed by Phil Alden Robinson, and starring Robin Williams, Mila Kunis, Peter Dinklage, and Melissa Leo. It is a remake of the 1997 Israeli film The 92 Minutes of Mr. Baum, written and directed by Assi Dayan. The film follows an angry, bitter man whose doctor tells him that he has a brain aneurysm and has only 90 minutes to live. As the patient races around the city trying to right his wrongs, the doctor attempts to find him and take him to a hospital. The film was released in a limited release and through video on demand on May 23, 2014, by Lionsgate. It was the final film starring Williams to be released during his lifetime.

== Plot ==
Stuck in Brooklyn traffic while on his way to a doctor appointment, Henry Altmann's car is suddenly struck by a taxi, propelling him into a rage he then unleashes on the taxi driver.

Arriving at a Brooklyn hospital, Dr. Sharon Gill is covering for Henry's usual doctor (with whom she is having an affair). Examining scans of his brain, she informs him that he has a brain aneurysm with a poor prognosis. He erupts, throwing insults at Sharon and demanding that she tell him how long he has to live. She tries to dodge the question, but Henry is persistent. Panicking, Sharon sees a magazine cover that says 90 minutes and blurts that out. Henry leaves, irate.

Talking with another doctor, Sharon realizes the consequences of her actions: she will surely be fired and lose her license. She resolves to find Henry and put him into immediate care.

Henry arrives at his family law firm, storming into a meeting between his brother Aaron and clients. He asks what a hypothetical client with only ninety minutes to live should do, and someone replies that he would make love to his wife one last time. Henry rushes home to his estranged wife, Bette, but catches her having an affair with their neighbor. Meanwhile, Sharon learns that Henry's case is serious enough that he could potentially die at any minute.

Sharon arrives at Henry's office, where she tells Aaron of his brother's diagnosis. He tells her that Henry was once a kind, happy man, but became embittered after the death of his son Peter two years prior. Meanwhile, Henry makes more stops on his quest for redemption, including attempting to contact his surviving son, Tommy. He had disapproved of his son's choice to become a professional dancer, creating a rift. He makes a recording, telling Tommy that he loves him, but flies into a rage halfway through and passes out.

When Henry regains consciousness, he goes to the Brooklyn Bridge, intent on jumping off. Sharon finds him there and apologizes for her earlier behavior, admitting that she has no idea when he might die. She begs him not to jump, saying that her career—and, by extension, her life—will be over if he does.

Henry still leaps off the bridge, however, and Sharon rushes to the river, dragging him to shore. He realizes it is his second chance, and asks her to help him make things right with his family. Checking her watch, he sees that he has only nineteen of the ninety minutes remaining. Sharon hails a cab, but it is driven by the same cabbie who hit Henry that morning. The men begin to fight, but she momentarily blinds the driver with pepper spray and they take off in his cab.

Driving to the Brooklyn Dancing Academy, Henry finds Tommy sitting alone. They begin to dance, just like when Tommy was a little boy. After sharing this moment with his son, Henry informs Sharon that he does not want to know when he will die. He will try to lead a better life with his remaining time, and both he and the doctor can find happiness. He rests his head on her shoulder, exhausted. Henry goes to the hospital and lives for another eight days, giving him time to share special moments with his family.

One year after Henry's death, Bette, Tommy, Aaron and Sharon are together on a ferry celebrating his life and spreading his ashes on the East River. The captain of the cruise ship tells them that it is illegal, but they berate him in Henry's honor.

== Cast ==
- Robin Williams as Henry Altmann / The Narrator
- Mila Kunis as Dr. Sharon Gill
- Peter Dinklage as Aaron Altmann
- Melissa Leo as Bette Altmann
- Hamish Linklater as Tommy Altmann
- James Earl Jones as Ruben
- Sutton Foster as Adela
- Richard Kind as Bix Field
- Daniel Raymont as Ulugbek
- Chris Gethard as Dr. Jordan Reed
- Jerry Adler as Cooper
- Bob Dishy as Frank
- Louis C.K. as Dr. Fielding (uncredited)
- Isiah Whitlock, Jr. as Yates
- Da'Vine Joy Randolph as Nurse Rowan
- Jeremie Harris as Leon
- Lee Garlington as Gummy
- Olga Merediz as Jane
- Hank Chen as Damien

== Reception ==
On review aggregation website Rotten Tomatoes, the film holds an approval rating of 9%, based on 32 reviews, with an average rating of 3.40/10. On Metacritic, the film has a weighted average score of 21 out of 100, based on 13 critics, indicating "generally unfavorable" reviews.

Peter Debruge of Variety called the film "a schmaltz opera that indulges Robin Williams' most melancholy tics and themes".

William Bibbiani at Craveonline found positives in the film, stating, "There’s a manic energy to this premise, the dogged efforts of a particularly screwed individual stymied at every turn, that evokes warm, funny memories of similar screwball stories."

== Release ==
In November 2013, Lionsgate acquired distribution rights to the film. It was released in a limited release and through video on demand on May 23, 2014.

== Home media ==
The film was released on DVD and Blu-ray on July 22, 2014.
