= Get Schooled =

American non-profit organization

The Get Schooled Foundation
- Industry: Nonprofit
- Founded: 2009 with 501(c)(3) status granted in 2010
- Founder: Viacom and Bill & Melinda Gates Foundation, with significant support from AT&T
- Headquarters: New York City
- Key people: John Branam, Executive Director
- Website: getschooled.com

The Get Schooled Foundation (also Get Schooled or getschooled.com) is a US national non-profit organization that helps young people in education and career development.

== History ==
Get Schooled was founded in 2009, with 501(c)(3) status granted in 2010, by the Gates Foundation and Viacom, also with involvement from Viacom's subsidiary Paramount Pictures. It began as a five year initiative to "generate greater awareness and engagement in addressing the nation’s education crisis and to offer practical resources and support to students." The nonprofit released a documentary titled Get Schooled: You Have the Right, featuring Barack Obama, LeBron James, and Kelly Clarkson. Part of the initiative included consultation between the Gates Foundation and Viacom networks to influence programming to include storylines based around education on existing shows or create new shows centered on education. The money provided by the foundation was used to "indirectly subsidize Viacom's programming".

Taco Bell partnered with Get Schooled in 2013 to launch Graduate for Más, a program to help students graduate from high school. In 2016, DJ Khaled was named the national spokesperson of Get Schooled, using Khaled's social media presence to promote multiple programs.

The Gates Foundation provided a $250,000 grant to Get Schooled in 2019.

In 2020, UK cyber security company TurgenSec reported a data breach of Get Schooled's website, leaving a database of 930,000 email addresses of children and students "open and accessible". The database also included names, ages, gender, and school and graduation details. Get Schooled disputed the size of the breach, claiming that only 250,000 accounts were exposed and about 75,000 of those accounts were linked to active email addresses.
