= The Cutting Edge: Chasing the Dream =

2008 television film directed by Stuart Gillard

- Screenplay by: Randall Badat
- Story by: Susan Jansen; Randall Badat
- Directed by: Stuart Gillard
- Starring: Matt Lanter; Francia Raisa; Christy Carlson Romano
- Music by: Robert Duncan
- Country of origin: United States
- Original language: English

Production
- Producer: Irene Litinsky
- Cinematography: Pierre Jodoin
- Running time: 92 minutes
- Production companies: Muse Entertainment; MGM Television

Original release
- Network: ABC Family
- Release: March 16, 2008

Related
- The Cutting Edge: Going for the Gold; The Cutting Edge: Fire and Ice

The Cutting Edge: Chasing the Dream is a 2008 sports-romantic drama television film, and the third installment in The Cutting Edge film series. The film was produced for the ABC Family cable channel, which aired on March 16, 2008. The film is rated PG-13.

== Plot ==
Zack Conroy (Matt Lanter) and former lover Celeste Mercier (Sarah Gadon) lose the gold to rivals Jason Bright (Ben Hollingsworth) and Cindy Halyard (Stéphanie Valois) at the International Figure Skating Conference in Tokyo. Zack and Celeste resolve to win the gold at nationals, but Celeste falls in a practice and fractures her ankle. Coach Bryan Hemmings (Stefano Colacitti) initially encounters difficulty in his search for a replacement partner for Zack.

Enter Alexandra Delgado, alias Alex (Francia Raisa). Zack realizes her potential as a professional skater when he loses to her in an ice hockey match. Hemmings, however, is unimpressed and refuses to coach the pair. Jackie Dorsey (Christy Carlson Romano) reluctantly agrees to serve as coach instead. She leads Zack and Alex into a strong first performance in the nationals, but a lapse in Zack's concentration causes Alex to fall.

Despite the blunder, the two make it to the International Skating Conference in Paris. There, Jason and Cindy engage in subterfuge and display a photo of Zack and Celeste kissing. Alex, hurt and betrayed, storms out of the press conference. She attempts to leave the next morning, but is swayed when Zack pleads with her and professes his love. They go on to skate in the final competition and execute a move which has only been done once before: the Pamchenko. That move wins them the gold, and upon completion of their program they seal their love with a kiss.

== Cast ==
- Matt Lanter as Zack Conroy
- Francia Raisa as Alexandra "Alex" Delgado
- Ben Hollingsworth as Jason Bright
- Stéphanie Valois as Cindy Halyard
- Alycia Purrott as Misha Pressel
- Christy Carlson Romano as Jackie Dorsey (credited as Christy Romano)
- Sarah Gadon as Celeste Mercier
- Adrianne Richards as a Reporter
- Luis Oliva as Bobby Delgado
- Stefano Colacitti as Bryan Hemmings (credited as Stefano Matteo Colacitti)
- Lori Graham as a TV Commentator

== Production ==
Star Francia Raisa was a fan of the previous Cutting Edge movies. "Especially with Cutting Edge, it was a huge movie – especially for ice skaters. ... I really wanted to live up to everyone’s expectations. My best friend’s boyfriend is a huge fan and when he found out he was really excited, but at the same time he was like, ‘Ugh. You know I love the first one, so we’ll see.’ So the fact that he loved it and everyone loved it was great for me."

"You have to remember so much choreography and I remember my partner Matt, he is a man and he’s never danced," said Raisa. "He was always focused on sports, so he never really had to memorize anything. It was so hard for him to pick up choreography. I was very fortunate that I’d been learning my whole life, so that I could pick up things very quickly and they didn’t have to work on me as much. It helped me get the role."

Speaking about the stunts, Raisa said, "Most of the stunts that they did, like the lifts that they did and the jumps were mostly them. I’m really proud to say that Matt and I did actually do one stunt of our own. In the first routine – it’s called the Jesus Christ because of the way he’s lifting me from the arms and my arms are out. That one we did do ourselves. Other than that, we let the pros handle everything else. But when we were gliding and doing crossovers and stuff like that, that was us, because we had a month of training so we could pull it off."

== Reception ==
Marilyn Moss of The Hollywood Reporter called the film "an exciting and fast-moving sports drama that gives viewers a good dose of romance as well."

Hannah Tucker of Entertainment Weekly gave the film a rating of C+, writing, " More than the axels and lutzes, it’s the dialogue ... that feels routine."

Emma Loggins of fanbolt.com gave the film a rating of C+, writing, "Definitely check it out at your next girl’s night, but keep in mind, in remembrance of the famous words uttered by Kate Moseley, this movie won’t kick a little ass."

Reviewer kubryk of insidepulse.com wrote, "There are some films that don’t need or warrant sequels, and The Cutting Edge was one of them. With this film marking an unholy trilogy of sorts, a recommendation for anything but would be unnecessarily cruel."
