= Renán Almendárez Coello =

Honduran-American journalist (born 1953)

- Born: November 18, 1953 (age 72); Honduras
- Occupation: Radio personality
- Spouse: Virginia Almendárez
- Children: 5; including Francia Raisa

Renán Almendárez Coello (born November 18, 1953), also known as El Cucuy De La Mañana, is a Honduran-American radio personality.

== Career ==
His program is carried on several affiliate stations across the United States. For six years, "El Cucuy" was the most-listened-to voice on L.A. radio, surpassing the ratings of Rick Dees and Howard Stern. Almendárez hosted the morning show on KLAX-FM in Los Angeles, California and had an estimated 3,000,000 listeners. Guzman left KLAX in September 2008 in order to launch a new radio network in addition to continuing on his television program on Azteca America. KLAX is now carrying the morning show of Joaquin Garza, "El Chulo de la Manaña", from sister station WLEY-FM in Chicago.

Almendárez began working in radio at age 15. After he interviewed the then-US Ambassador to Honduras, John Negroponte, Negroponte arranged for a visa and Almendárez emigrated to the U.S. He became a citizen of the United States in 2000. He is active in encouraging Latinos to vote and to take part in activism against anti-illegal immigrant legislation and sentiment, such as the 2006 Great American Boycott. He is the author of El Cucuy de la Mañana: My Life in Radio's Fast Lane. He is the father of actress Francia Raisa and Cynthia Benson.

On November 25, 2014, he was honored with a star on the Hollywood Walk of Fame. Now he is working for Audiorama Comunicaciones.

== El Cucuy Foundation ==
El Cucuy Foundation is a 501(c)(3) non-profit charity serving individuals across the United States, Mexico and Central America.

== Publications ==
=== Books ===
- El Cucuy: En la Cumbre de la Pobreza, Autobiography, by Renan Almendarez Coello, Spanish, 2003,ISBN 0-06-000998-5
- El Cucuy de la Mañana, Renan Almendarez Coello, Audio CD, Spanish, 2002,
- Renan Almendarez Coello, El Cucuy de la Manana, by Fernando Schiantarelli, 2002

== See also ==
- Great American Boycott
