= The Cutting Edge: Fire and Ice =

- Genre: Drama; Family; Fantasy
- Written by: Holly Brix
- Directed by: Stephen Herek
- Starring: Francia Raisa; Brendan Fehr
- Music by: Bennett Salvay
- Country of origin: United States
- Original language: English

Production
- Executive producers: Sara Berrisford; Hudson Hickman; Michael Prupas; Craig Roessler
- Producer: Irene Litinsky
- Cinematography: Pierre Jodoin
- Editors: Seth Flaum; Anthony Markward
- Running time: 87 minutes
- Production companies: Muse Entertainment; MGM Television

Original release
- Network: ABC Family
- Release: March 14, 2010

Related
- The Cutting Edge: Chasing the Dream

The Cutting Edge: Fire and Ice is a 2010 American sports-romantic drama television film, the sequel to The Cutting Edge: Chasing the Dream (2008), and the fourth and final installment (as of 2026) in The Cutting Edge film series. Francia Raisa reprises her role as Alexandra "Alex" Delgado, from the third film. The film was produced for the ABC Family cable channel, which aired on March 14, 2010.

== Plot ==
Alexandra "Alex" Delgado's figure skating career came to an abrupt halt after her partner (on and off the ice) became injured. As their love affair cooled, a heart-broken Alex stopped competing and turned to teaching. Enter James McKinsey, the smoldering bad boy of speed skating, who has had fiery Alex in his sights as a skating partner ever since he was banned from speed skating. There are not many girls who say no to James, and Alex may well be the first. However, James pushes her buttons, challenging her like no one else and her fighting spirit returns. She agrees to be his partner and they begin a grueling practice regimen fueled (and occasionally derailed) by their own tempestuous relationship which heats up as they get closer to competition. But will their passion destroy Alex's chance to bring home the gold again?

== Cast ==
- Francia Raisa as Alexandra "Alex" Delgado
- Brendan Fehr as James McKinsey
- Zhenhu Han as Zhen Zheng
- Russell Yuen as Mr. Wan
- Dan Jeannotte as Angus Dwell
