= Francia Raisa =

American actress (born 1988)

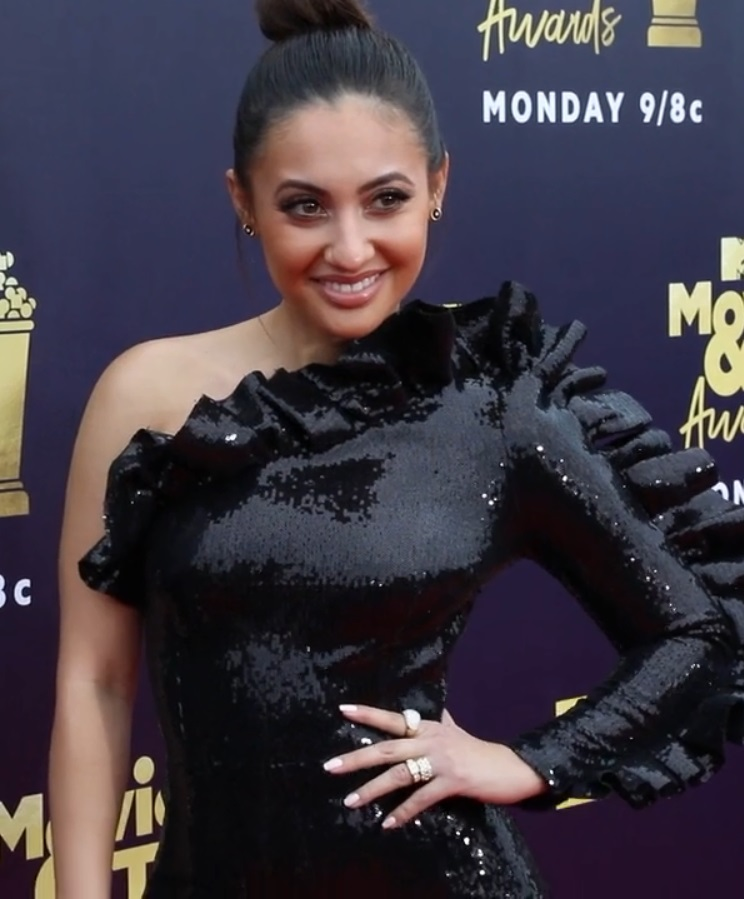
- Raisa in June 2018
- Born: Francia Raisa Almendárez; July 26, 1988 (age 38); Los Angeles, California, U.S.
- Occupation: Actress
- Years active: 2004–present
- Father: Renán Almendárez Coello

Francia Raisa Almendárez (born July 26, 1988) is an American actress. Raisa is known for her roles in Bring It On: All or Nothing, The Secret Life of the American Teenager, Grown-ish, and How I Met Your Father.

== Early life and education ==
Raisa was born in Los Angeles, California to a Mexican mother, Virginia Almendárez (née Pelayo), and Renán Almendárez Coello, a Honduran-born radio personality; and raised in Los Angeles. A few years after she was born, her father started using his new Latin radio personality, "El Cucuy".

Raisa attended Bishop Alemany High School in Mission Hills, where she was a cheerleader.

== Career ==
Raisa began to take acting jobs in her junior year of high school, modeling for print ads and appearing in commercials. She guest-starred in the sitcoms American Family: Journey of Dreams and Over There. Raisa appeared in Lil' Romeo's music video "My Girlfriend" as Tamy in 2004 and in Iyaz's music video "So Big". A month into her senior year, she booked one of her first lead roles, starring opposite Hayden Panettiere in Bring It On: All or Nothing. She co-starred in the Nickelodeon movie Shredderman Rules, where she portrayed Isabel, and in The Cutting Edge: Chasing the Dream and The Cutting Edge: Fire and Ice as Alexandra Delgado. She played the role of Adrian Lee in the hit ABC Family drama, The Secret Life of the American Teenager, from its beginning in July 2008, until the series finale in early June 2013.

In 2009, Raisa guest-starred on the USA Network's TV series In Plain Sight and co-starred in a short film directed by David Henrie called Boo, which aired on YouTube. In 2013, Raisa starred in the Christmas-themed movie Christmas Bounty alongside Mike "The Miz" Mizanin.

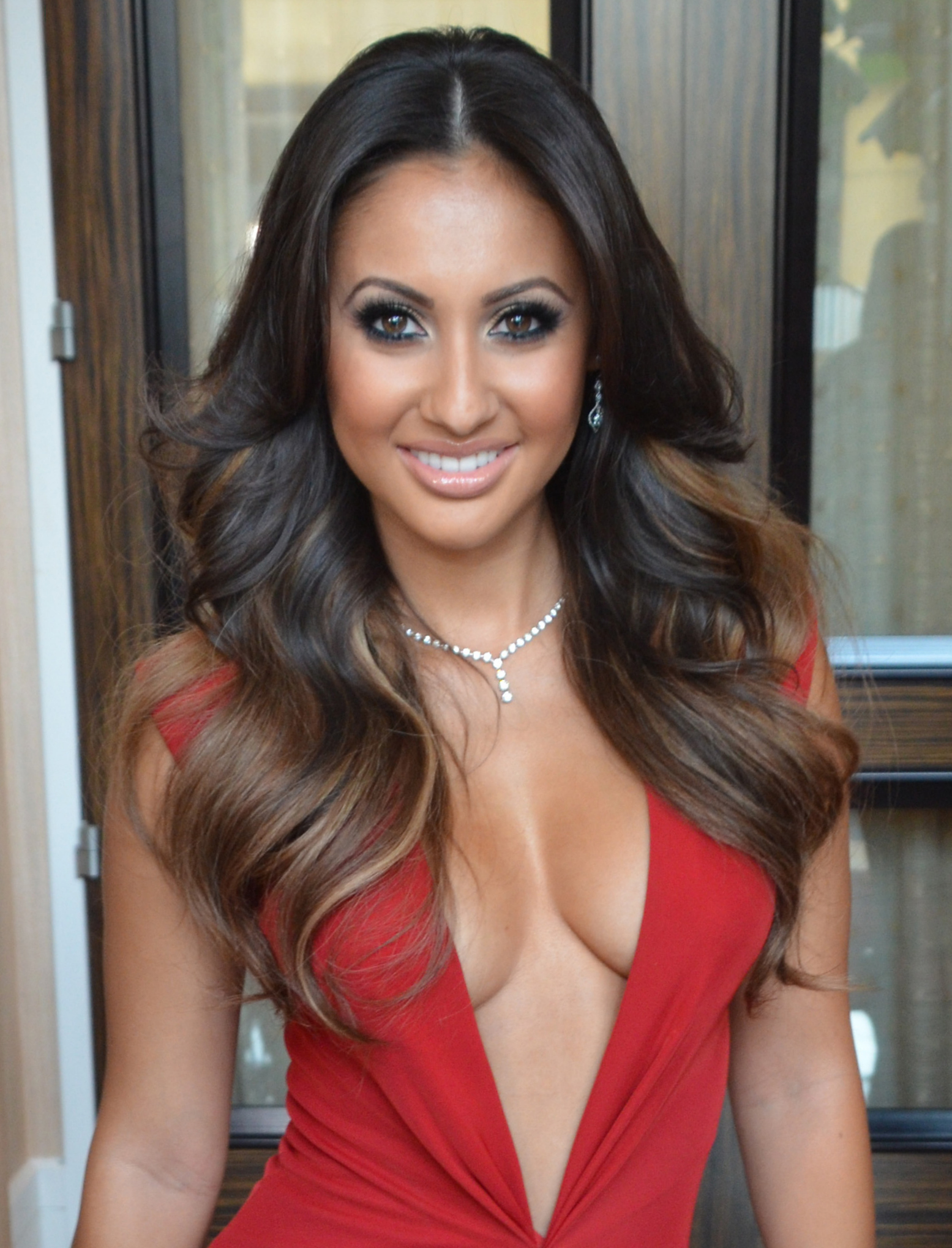
Raisa in August 2012

From 2018 to 2022, Raisa starred in the Freeform show, Grown-ish, executive produced by Black-ish creator Kenya Barris. She starred in the show's first four seasons, exiting upon the character's graduation at the end of the fourth season. She also starred in Freeform's 2018 television film, Life-Size 2, opposite Tyra Banks. The film was part of the network’s 25 Days of Christmas promotion.

In May 2021, Raisa was cast in How I Met Your Mother's spinoff series How I Met Your Father, which premiered on Hulu on January 18, 2022. In February 2022, the series was renewed for a 20-episode second season. In September 2023, however, it was cancelled after two seasons.

== Personal life ==
Raisa was born in Los Angeles.

In the summer of 2017, Raisa donated one of her kidneys to singer and actress Selena Gomez, who has lupus. The latter was told by doctors that the two were a match and later informed Raisa of the confirmation. In 2023, Raisa shared on Instagram about her recent diagnosis with polyendocrine metabolic ovarian syndrome (PMOS).

== Filmography ==
=== Film ===
Year	Title	Role	Notes
2006	Bring It On: All or Nothing	Leti	Direct-to-video; credited as Francia Almendarez
2009	Fired Up!	Marly	
2010	Bulletface	Maria	
2013	Chastity Bites	Katharine	
2018	Beyond Paradise	Shahrzad	

=== Television ===
Year	Title	Role	Notes
2004	Smallville	Race Car Girl	Episode: "Velocity"
2005	Over There	Sawa	Episode: "The Prisoner"
2007	Shredderman Rules	Isabel Lopez	Television film
2008	The Cutting Edge: Chasing the Dream	Alexandra "Alex" Delgado	Television film
2008–2013	The Secret Life of the American Teenager	Adrian Lee	Main role
2009	In Plain Sight	Olivia Moreno / Olivia Morales	Episode: "Jailbait"
2010	The Cutting Edge: Fire and Ice	Alexandra "Alex" Delgado	Television film
2012	CSI: Crime Scene Investigation	Erin Vickler	Episode: "Trends with Benefits"
2013	Company Town	Grace	Television film
2013	Massholes	Francia Raisa	Episode: "Catfish and Coldcuts"
2013	The Mindy Project	Katie	Episode: "Frat Party"
2013	Christmas Bounty	Tory Bell	Television film
2013	A Snow Globe Christmas	Penny	Television film
2016	The Wrong Car	Gretchen	Television film
2016	Hit the Floor	Rennae	Episodes: "Carrying", "Killer Crossover"
2017	Dear White People	Vanessa	Episodes: "Chapter VI", "Chapter X"
2017	Tiny House of Terror	Sam	Television film
2017	Once Upon a Date	Izzy Flores	Television film
2018	Black-ish	Ana Torres	Episode: "Don't You Be My Neighbor"
2018–2024	Grown-ish	Ana Torres	Main role (seasons 1–4); guest role (seasons 5–6)
2018	Life-Size 2	Grace Manning	Television film
2022–2023	How I Met Your Father	Valentina	Main role
2024–2025	Lopez vs. Lopez	Carina	Episodes: "Lopez vs. Sobriety" and "Lopez vs. Escándalo"

=== Music videos ===
Year	Title	Artist(s)
2010	"So Big"	Iyaz
2013	"Everybody Knows"	Dustin Tavella
2015	"Gibberish" (feat. Hoodie Allen)	MAX
2020	"Man"	JoJo
2020	"Red Sangria"	Jordin Sparks

== Awards and nominations ==
Year	Award	Category	Nominated work	Result	Refs
2011	ALMA Awards	Favorite TV Actress: Leading Role in a Drama	The Secret Life of the American Teenager	Nominated	
2011	Gracie Allen Awards	Outstanding Female Rising Star in a Drama Series or Special	The Secret Life of the American Teenager	Won	
2012	Teen Choice Awards	Choice Scene Stealer: Female	The Secret Life of the American Teenager	Nominated	
2012	Imagen Awards	Best Young Actress in a Television Series	The Secret Life of the American Teenager	Nominated	
2016	Imagen Awards	Best Actress - Feature Film	Beyond Paradise	Nominated	
2018	Imagen Awards	Best Supporting Actress - Television	Grown-ish	Nominated	
2022	NHMC Impact Awards Gala	Impact Award for Performance in a Sitcom	How I Met Your Father	Won	
