= List of Hannah Montana songs =

This is a list of songs performed by Miley Stewart's alter ego, Hannah Montana; used in the series, Hannah Montana (2006–2011); and used in the film, The Hannah Montana Movie (2009).

All songs are listed by order of album released, then by appearance in the series. Songs are not included if they are one line or shorter.

== First season: 2006–2007 ==
Title	Writer(s)	First appearance	Last appearance	Ref.
"The Best of Both Worlds"	Matthew Gerrard; Robbie Nevil	1. "Lilly, Do You Want to Know a Secret?"	26. "Bad Moose Rising"	
"This Is the Life"	Jeannie Lurie; Shari Short	1. "Lilly, Do You Want to Know a Secret?"	13. "You're So Vain, You Probably Think This Zit is About You"	
"Just Like You"	Adam Watts; Andy Dodd	2. "Miley Get Your Gum"	5. "It's My Party and I'll Lie if I Want To"	
"Pumpin' Up the Party"	Jamie Houston	3. "She's a Supersneak"	24. "The Idol Side of Me"	
"The Other Side of Me"	Matthew Gerrard; Robbie Nevil	4. "I Can't Make You Love Hannah If You Don't"	24. "The Idol Side of Me"	
"Who Said"	Matthew Gerrard; Robbie Nevil; Jay Landers	10. "Oh Say, Can You Remember the Words?"	26. "Bad Moose Rising"	
"I Want My Mullet Back"^{[A]} (Billy Ray Cyrus)	Billy Ray Cyrus	12. "On the Road Again?"	—N/a	—N/a
"If We Were a Movie"^{[B]}	Jeannie Lurie; Holly Mathis	16. "Good Golly, Miss Dolly"	21. "My Boyfriend's Jackson and There's Gonna Be Trouble"	
"Stand"^{[A]} (Billy Ray Cyrus)	Andy Dodd; Adam Watts	17. "Torn Between Two Hannahs"	—N/a	—N/a
"I Got Nerve"	Jeannie Lurie; Ken Hauptman; Aruna Abrams	17. "Torn Between Two Hannahs”	—N/a	
"Rockin' Around the Christmas Tree"^{[C]}	Johnny Marks	—N/a	—N/a	—N/a

== Second season: 2007–2008 ==
Title	Writer(s)	First appearance	Last appearance	Ref.
"Make Some Noise"	Andy Dodd; Adam Watts	1. "Me and Rico Down by the School Yard"	14. "Everybody Was Best-Friend Fighting"	
"My Kids Are All Gone"^{[D]} (Billy Ray Cyrus)	—N/a	1. "Me and Rico Down by the School Yard"	—N/a	—N/a
"True Friend"	Jeannie Lurie	2. "Cuffs Will Keep Us Together"	26. "Yet Another Side of Me"	
"One in a Million"	Toby Gad; Negin Djafari	3. "You Are So Sue-able to Me"	26. "Yet Another Side of Me"	
"I Miss You" (Miley Cyrus)	Miley Cyrus; Wendi Foy Green; Brian Green	3. "You Are So Sue-able to Me"	3. "You Are So Sue-able to Me"	
"Nobody's Perfect"	Matthew Gerrard; Robbie Nevil	4. "Get Down Study-udy-udy"	22. "(We're So Sorry) Uncle Earl"	
"Bone Dance"^{[E]} (Miley Cyrus)	—N/a	4. "Get Down Study-udy-udy"	—N/a	—N/a
"Life's What You Make It"^{[F]}	Matthew Gerrard; Robbie Nevil	5. "I Am Hannah, Hear Me Croak"	28. "Joannie B. Goode"	
"You and Me Together"^{[G]} (Miley Cyrus and Brooke Shields)	—N/a	5. "I Am Hannah, Hear Me Croak"	—N/a	—N/a
"Cheese Jerky"^{[D]} (Jason Earles and Mitchel Musso)	—N/a	9. "Achy Jakey Heart, Part 1"	—N/a	—N/a
"Bigger Than Us"	Antonina Armato; Tim James	11. "Sleepwalk This Way"	15. "Song Sung Bad"	
"Old Blue Jeans" (Miley Cyrus)	Michael Bradford; Pam Sheyne	12. "When You Wish You Were The Star"	23. "The Way We Almost Weren't"	
"We're Walking Down the Beach Because We're Mega Stars"^{[D]} (Mitchel Musso and Jesse McCartney)	—N/a	12. "When You Wish You Were The Star"	—N/a	—N/a
"If Cupid Had a Heart"^{[H]} (Julie Griffin, lip-synced by Selena Gomez)	—N/a	13. "I Want You to Want Me... to Go to Florida"	—N/a	—N/a
"Ready, Set, Don't Go"^{[I]} (Billy Ray Cyrus)	Billy Ray Cyrus; Casey Beathard	13. "I Want You to Want Me... to Go to Florida"	—N/a	—N/a
"We Got the Party"^{[J]} (featuring the Jonas Brothers)	Kara DioGuardi; Greg Wells	16. "Me and Mr. Jonas and Mr. Jonas and Mr. Jonas"	—N/a	
"Rock Star"	Aristedis Archoritis; Jeannie Lurie; Chen Neeman	21. "Bye Bye Ball"	22. "(We're So Sorry) Uncle Earl"	
"Life's What You Make It"^{[F]} (Miley Cyrus and Joey Fatone)	Matthew Gerrard; Robbie Nevil	21. "Bye Bye Ball"	—N/a	—N/a
"I Used to be a Nice Girl"^{[H]}	—N/a	26. "Yet Another Side of Me"	—N/a	—N/a
"If We Were a Movie"^{[B]} (featuring Corbin Bleu)	Jennie Lurie; Holly Mathis	29. "We're All on This Date Together"	—N/a	—N/a
"You and Me Together"^{[G]}	Jamie Houstin	—N/a	—N/a	
"We Got the Party"^{[J]}	Kara DioGuardi; Greg Wells	—N/a	—N/a	

== Third season: 2008–2010 ==
Title	Writer(s)	First appearance	Last appearance	Ref.
"Let's Get Crazy"	Colleen Fitzpatrick; Michael Kotch; Dave Derby; Michael "Smidi" Smith; Stefanie Ridel; Mim Nervo; Liv Nervo	1. "He Ain't a Hottie, He's My Brother"	24. "Judge Me Tender"	
"Let's Make This Last 4Ever" (Mitchel Musso)	Justin Gray; Michael Raphael; Sam Musso; Mitchel Musso	7. "You Gotta Lose That Job"	—N/a	
"Supergirl"^{[K]}	Dan James; Kara DioGuardi	8. "Welcome to the Bungle"	17. "Miley Hurt the Feelings of the Radio Star"	
"Super Carrot"^{[E]} (Miley Cyrus)	—N/a	8. "Welcome to the Bungle"	—N/a	
"Let's Do This"	Derek George; Tim Owens; Adam Tefteller; Ali Theodore	9. "Papa's Got a Brand New Friend"	24. "Judge Me Tender"	
"Single Dad Blues"^{[L]} (Billy Ray Cyrus)	—N/a	10. "Cheat It"	—N/a	
"Ice Cream Freeze (Let's Chill)"	Matthew Gerrard; Robbie Nevil	11. "Knock Knock Knockin' on Jackson's Head"	—N/a	
"I Wanna Know You"^{[M]} (featuring David Archuleta)	Chen Neeman; Jeannie Lurie; Aris Archontis	14. "Promma Mia"	—N/a	
"He Could Be the One"	Kara DioGuardi; Mitch Allan	18. "He Could Be the One"	—N/a	
"Don't Wanna Be Torn"	Kara DioGuardi; Mitch Allan	18. "He Could Be the One"	—N/a	
"I'm Just Having Fun"^{[E]}	—N/a	18. "He Could Be the One"	—N/a	
Untitled Narrative Songs^{[N]} (Jason Earles and Moises Arias)	—N/a	18. "He Could Be the One"	—N/a	
"It's All Right Here"	Antonina Armato; Tim James	19. "Super(stitious) Girl"	—N/a	
"Let's Do This"^{[O]} (Mitchel Musso)	Derek George; Tim Owens; Adam Tefteller; Ali Theodore	24. "Judge Me Tender"	—N/a	
"Welcome to Hollywood"^{[O]} (Mitchel Musso)	Bryan Todd; Andreas Carlsson	24. "Judge Me Tender"	—N/a	
"Every Part of Me"	Adam Watts; Andy Dodd	29. "Miley Says Goodbye? Part 1"	—N/a	
"Mixed Up"	Kara DioGuardi; Marti Frederiksen	30. "Miley Says Goodbye? Part 2"	—N/a	
"Just a Girl"^{[P]}	Toby Gad; Arama Brown	—N/a	—N/a	
"I Wanna Know You"^{[M]}	Chen Neeman; Jeannie Lurie; Aris Archontis	—N/a	—N/a	

== Hannah Montana: The Movie: 2009 ==
Title	Writer(s)	Ref.
"The Best of Both Worlds" (2009 Movie Mix)	Matthew Gerrard; Robbie Nevil	
"The Good Life"	Matthew Gerrard; Bridget Benenate	
"Game Over" (Steve Rushton)	Steve Rushton; Antony Westgate; Nigel Clark	
"Everything I Want" (Steve Rushton)	Steve Rushton	
"Backwards" (Rascal Flatts)	Marcel; Tony Mullins	
"Bless the Broken Road" (Rascal Flatts)	Bobby Boyd; Jeff Hanna; Marcus Hummon	
"Don't Walk Away" (Miley Cyrus)	Miley Cyrus; John Shanks; Hillary Lindsey	
"Dream" (Miley Cyrus)	John Shanks; Kara DioGuardi	
"Back to Tennessee"^{[X]} (Billy Ray Cyrus)	Billy Ray Cyrus; Tamara Dunn; Matthew Wilder	
"Crazier" (Taylor Swift)	Taylor Swift; Robert Ellis Orrall	
"Hoedown Throwdown" (Miley Cyrus)	Adam Anders; Nikki Hassman	
"Butterfly Fly Away" (Miley Cyrus and Billy Ray Cyrus)	Glen Ballard; Alan Silvestri	
"The Climb" (Miley Cyrus)	Jessi Alexander; Jon Mabe	
"You'll Always Find Your Way Back Home"	Taylor Swift; Martin Johnson	
"Spotlight"	Scott Cutler; Anne Preven	
"What's Not to Like"	Matthew Gerrard; Robbie Nevil	

== Fourth season: 2010–2011 ==
Title	Writer(s)	First appearance	Last appearance	Ref.
"Are You Ready"^{[X]}	Toby Gad; BC Jean; Lyrica Anderson	1. "Sweet Home Hannah Montana"	—N/a	
"Ordinary Girl"	Toby Gad; Arama Brown	2. "Hannah Montana to the Principal's Office"	—N/a	
"Need a Little Love" (with Sheryl Crow)	Jaime Houston	4. "It's the End of the Jake as We Know It"	—N/a	
"Been Here All Along"	Jennie Lurie; Aris Archontis; Chen Neeman	6. "Been Here All Along"	10. "Can You See the Real Me?"	
"Que Sera"	Toby Gad; BC Jean; Denise Rich	6. "Been Here All Along"	8. "Hannah's Gonna Get This"	
"I'm Still Good"	Jennie Lurie; Aris Archontis; Chen Neeman	6. "Been Here All Along"	—N/a	
"Love That Let's Go" (with Billy Ray Cyrus)	Adam Anders; Nikki Hassman	7. "Love That Let's Go"	—N/a	
"Gonna Get This"^{[X]}	Niclas Molinder; Joacim Persson; Johan Alkenäs; Drew Ryan Scott	8. "Hannah's Gonna Get This"	9. "I'll Always Remember You"	
"Gonna Get This"^{[X]} (featuring Iyaz)	Niclas Molinder; Joacim Persson; Johan Alkenäs; Drew Ryan Scott	8. "Hannah's Gonna Get This"	—N/a	
"Barefoot Cinderella"	Jaime Houston; James Dean Hicks	9. "I'll Always Remember You"	13. "Wherever I Go"	
"I'll Always Remember You"	Mitch Allan; Jessi Alexander	9. "I'll Always Remember You"	13. "Wherever I Go"	
"Wherever I Go"^{[X]}	Adam Watts; Andy Dodd	9. "I'll Always Remember You"	9. "I'll Always Remember You"	
Untitled Narrative Songs^{[X]} (Jason Earles, Moises Arias and Tammin Sursok)	—N/a	9. "I'll Always Remember You"	—N/a	
"Kiss It Goodbye"	Niclas Molinder; Joacim Persson; Jakob Hazell; Charlie Masson; Christoffer Wikberg	11. "Kiss It All Goodbye"	13. "Wherever I Go"	
"Feels Like the Right Time"^{[X]} (Billy Ray Cyrus and Dolly Parton)	—N/a	11. "Kiss It All Goodbye"	—N/a	
"Wherever I Go"^{[X]} (featuring Emily Osment)	Adam Watts; Andy Dodd	13. "Wherever I Go"	—N/a	

== Notes ==
A. "I Want My Mullet Back" and "Stand" both appeared in the series but did not appear on a soundtrack. Both songs later appeared on Billy Ray Cyrus' ninth studio album Wanna Be Your Joe (2006).

B. The solo version of "If We Were a Movie" appeared in the first season of the series and on Hannah Montana (2006).The song later appeared on the second season, as a duet with Corbin Bleu.

C. "Rockin' Around the Christmas Tree" did not appear in the series, and only appeared on Hannah Montana: Holiday Edition

D. "My Kids Are All Gone", "Cheese Jerky" and "We're Walking Down the Beach Because We're Mega Stars" were used in the series to add comedy, and did not appear on any soundtrack.

E. "Bone Dance", "Super Carrot" and "I'm Just Having Fun" are all variations of other songs. "Bone Dance" is a variation of "Nobody's Perfect", "Super Carrot" is a variation of "Supergirl" and "I'm Just Having Fun" is a variation of "He Could Be the One".

F. The solo version of "Life's What You Make It" was performed in the series, and was featured on the soundtrack. The song was performed again later in the series by Miley Cyrus, as a duet with Joey Fatone.

G. During the series, "You and Me Together" was performed by Miley Cyrus as a duet with Brooke Shields. The song was later released on the soundtrack in a solo form.

H. "If Cupid Had a Heart" and "I Used to be a Nice Girl" appeared in the series, but did not appear on the soundtrack.

I. "Ready, Set, Don't Go" was performed in the series by Billy Ray Cyrus, and the song did not appear on the soundtrack. The song was later re-recorded with Miley Cyrus and released as a single from his tenth studio album, Home at Last (2007).

J. The duet version of "We Got the Party" with the Jonas Brothers appeared in the series, while the solo version did not. The solo version was released on Hannah Montana 2: Meet Miley Cyrus, while the duet version appeared only on the Rockstar Edition of the album.

K. "Supergirl" is first heard in "He Ain't a Hottie, He's My Brother," where Robby sings a brief excerpt while writing the song. However, the song is performed more fully in "Welcome to the Bungle," and is also the first time Hannah sings the song.

L. "Single Dad Blues" was performed in the series by Billy Ray Cyrus, but failed to appear on the soundtrack.

M. In the series, "I Wanna Know You" was performed with David Archuleta. Two versions of the song appeared on the soundtrack: the duet with David Archuleta, and a solo version of the song.

N. The narrative songs featured in the episode include:

1. Smothers Brothers parody
2. Scottish song to the tune of "The Irish Washerwoman"
3. Blues Brothers parody
4. Reggae song
5. Disco song parody, to the tune of "I Will Survive"
6. Scene change music cue, Hannah Montana parody
7. Minstrel song to the tune of "Greensleeves"
8. Pop song to the tune of "Best of Both Worlds", Hannah Montana parody

O. The version of "Let's Do This" performed by Mitchel Musso did not appear on the soundtrack. "Welcome to Hollywood", also performed by Mitchel Musso was performed in the series, and was not featured on the soundtrack as well, although it later appeared on his self-titled debut album (2009).

P. "Just a Girl" appeared on the soundtrack, but was not featured in the series.

The narrative songs in the episode include:

1. Alvin and the Chipmunks parody, to the tune of "Camptown Races"
2. Electronic song
3. Show tune parody
4. Old-time song
5. Show tune parody
6. Western song
7. Lady Gaga's "Bad Romance" parody
8. Lullaby to the tune of "Twinkle Twinkle Little Star"
