= List of Hannah Montana episodes =

The following is a list of episodes of the Disney Channel sitcom, Hannah Montana, created by Michael Poryes, Rich Correll and Barry O'Brien. The series debuted on March 24, 2006. The program centers on Miley Stewart (portrayed by Miley Cyrus), a teenage girl living a double life as famous pop singer Hannah Montana, where she conceals her real identity from everyone else except for her family and a few close friends.

The fourth season premiered on July 11, 2010 and ended on January 16, 2011 with a one-hour series finale. During its run, 98 episodes of the series aired.

== Series overview ==
Season	Episodes	Originally released	
Season	Episodes	First released	Last released
1	26	March 24, 2006	March 30, 2007
2	29	April 23, 2007	October 12, 2008
3	30	November 2, 2008	March 14, 2010
4	13	July 11, 2010	January 16, 2011

== Episodes ==
=== Season 1 (2006–07) ===
No. overall	No. in season	Title	Directed by	Written by	Original release date	Prod. code	Viewers (millions)
1	1	"Lilly, Do You Want to Know a Secret?"	Lee Shallat-Chemel	Story by : Michael Poryes & Rich Correll & Barry O'Brien; Teleplay by : Michael Poryes & Gary Dontzig & Steven Peterman	March 24, 2006	101	5.4
2	2	"Miley Get Your Gum"	David Kendall	Michael Poryes	March 31, 2006	103	4.0
3	3	"She's a Supersneak"	David Kendall	Kim Friese	April 7, 2006	105	N/A
4	4	"I Can't Make You Love Hannah if You Don't"	Roger S. Christiansen	Kim Friese	April 14, 2006	108	3.9
5	5	"It's My Party and I'll Lie if I Want To"	Roger S. Christiansen	Douglas Lieblein	April 21, 2006	102	N/A
6	6	"Grandmas Don't Let Your Babies Grow Up to Play Favorites"	Roger S. Christiansen	Douglas Lieblein	April 28, 2006	109	N/A
7	7	"It's a Mannequin's World"	Roger S. Christiansen	Howard Meyers	May 12, 2006	110	N/A
8	8	"Mascot Love"	Roger S. Christiansen	Sally Lapiduss	May 26, 2006	111	N/A
9	9	"Ooo, Ooo, Itchy Woman"	David Kendall	Gary Dontzig & Steven Peterman	June 10, 2006	104	3.7
10	10	"O Say, Can You Remember the Words?"	Lee Shallat-Chemel	Sally Lapiduss	June 30, 2006	113	N/A
11	11	"Oops! I Meddled Again!"	Chip Hurd	Lisa Albert	July 15, 2006	107	N/A
12	12	"On the Road Again?" (Note: Part 3 of "That's So Suite Life of Hannah Montana")	Roger S. Christiansen	Steven James Meyer	July 28, 2006	112	7.1
13	13	"You're So Vain, You Probably Think This Zit is About You"	Chip Hurd	Todd J. Greenwald	August 12, 2006	106	N/A
14	14	"New Kid in School"	Kenneth Shapiro	Todd J. Greenwald	August 18, 2006	114	N/A
15	15	"More Than a Zombie to Me"	Roger S. Christiansen	Steven Peterman	September 8, 2006	116	N/A
16	16	"Good Golly, Miss Dolly"	Roger S. Christiansen	Sally Lapiduss	September 29, 2006	118	N/A
17	17	"Torn Between Two Hannahs"	Roger S. Christiansen	Story by : Valerie Ahern & Christian McLaughlin; Teleplay by : Todd J. Greenwald	October 14, 2006	126	N/A
18	18	"People Who Use People"	Shannon Flynn	Michael Poryes	November 3, 2006	119	N/A
19	19	"Money for Nothing, Guilt for Free"	Roger S. Christiansen	Heather Wordham	November 26, 2006 (Note: This episode was first released in Livin' the Rock Star Live DVD on October 24, 2006.)	115	N/A
20	20	"Debt It Be"	Roger S. Christiansen	Sally Lapiduss & Heather Wordham	December 1, 2006	120	N/A
21	21	"My Boyfriend's Jackson and There's Gonna Be Trouble"	Roger S. Christiansen	Andrew Green & Sally Lapiduss	January 1, 2007	124	3.98
22	22	"We Are Family, Now Get Me Some Water!"	Roger S. Christiansen	Jay J. Demopoulos & Andrew Green	January 7, 2007	122	N/A
23	23	"Schooly Bully"	Roger S. Christiansen	Douglas Lieblein & Heather Wordham	January 19, 2007	125	3.64
24	24	"The Idol Side of Me"	Fred Savage	Douglas Lieblein	February 9, 2007	117	3.7
25	25	"Smells Like Teen Sellout"	Sheldon Epps	Heather Wordham	March 2, 2007	123	4.4
26	26	"Bad Moose Rising"	Roger S. Christiansen	Steven James Meyer & Douglas Lieblein	March 30, 2007	121	N/A

=== Season 2 (2007–08) ===
No. overall	No. in season	Title	Directed by	Written by	Original release date	Prod. code	Viewers (millions)
27	1	"Me and Rico Down by the Schoolyard"	Roger S. Christiansen	Heather Wordham	April 23, 2007	203	3.5
28	2	"Cuffs Will Keep Us Together"	Roger S. Christiansen	Steven Peterman	April 24, 2007	201	3.5
29	3	"You Are So Sue-able to Me"	Roger S. Christiansen	Sally Lapiduss	April 25, 2007	202	3.9
30	4	"Get Down, Study-udy-udy"	Roger S. Christiansen	Andrew Green	April 26, 2007	204	3.7
31	5	"I Am Hannah, Hear Me Croak"	Roger S. Christiansen	Michael Poryes	April 27, 2007	206	3.5
32	6	"You Gotta Not Fight for Your Right to Party"	Jody Margolin Hahn	Steven James Meyer	May 4, 2007	207	3.5
33	7	"My Best Friend's Boyfriend"	Roger S. Christiansen	Jay J. Demopoulos	May 18, 2007	209	3.8
34	8	"Take This Job and Love It"	Roger S. Christiansen	Sally Lapiduss	June 16, 2007	210	N/A
35	9	"Achy Jakey Heart" (Part 1)	Rich Correll	Douglas Lieblein	June 24, 2007	211	7.4
36	10	"Achy Jakey Heart" (Part 2)	Roger S. Christiansen	Andrew Green	June 24, 2007	212	7.4
37	11	"Sleepwalk This Way"	Roger S. Christansen	Heather Wordham	July 7, 2007	213	N/A
38	12	"When You Wish You Were the Star"	Roger S. Christansen	Douglas Lieblein	July 13, 2007	205	5.1
39	13	"I Want You to Want Me... to Go to Florida"	Roger S. Christansen	Michael Poryes	July 21, 2007	208	4.5
40	14	"Everybody Was Best-Friend Fighting"	Jody Margolin Hahn	Sally Lapiduss	July 29, 2007	215	4.8
41	15	"Song Sung Bad"	Roger S. Christiansen	Ingrid Escajeda	August 4, 2007	214	4.7
42	16	"Me and Mr. Jonas and Mr. Jonas and Mr. Jonas"	Mark Cendrowski	Douglas Lieblein	August 17, 2007	217	10.7
43	17	"Don't Stop 'Til You Get the Phone"	Rich Correll	Michael Poryes	September 21, 2007	222	5.1
44	18	"That's What Friends Are For?"	Mark Cendrowski	Douglas Lieblein	October 19, 2007	224	5.4
45	19	"Lilly's Mom Has Got It Goin' On"	Jody Margolin Hahn	Norm Gunzenhauser	November 10, 2007	216	5.5
46	20	"I Will Always Loathe You"	Roger S. Christiansen	Michael Poryes	December 7, 2007	218	4.4
47	21	"Bye Bye Ball"	Sean Lambert	Heather Wordham	January 13, 2008	220	4.2
48	22	"(We're So Sorry) Uncle Earl"	Rich Correll	Robin J. Stein	March 21, 2008	226	3.6
49	23	"The Way We Almost Weren't"	Rich Correll	Andrew Green	May 4, 2008	219	3.1
50	24	"You Didn't Say It Was Your Birthday"	Rich Correll	Heather Wordham	July 6, 2008	225	5.1
51	25	"Hannah in the Streets with Diamonds"	Roger S. Christiansen	Jay J. Demopoulos & Steven James Meyer	July 20, 2008	228	3.8
52	26	"Yet Another Side of Me"	Shannon Flynn	Story by : Heather Wordham; Teleplay by : Andrew Green & Sally Lapiduss	August 3, 2008	229	4.6
53	27	"The Test of My Love"	Rich Correll	Jay J. Demopoulos & Steven James Meyer	August 31, 2008	221	3.9
54	28	"Joannie B. Goode"	Rondell Sheridan	Andrew Green	September 14, 2008	227	4.6
55	29	"We're All on This Date Together"	Roger S. Christiansen	Steven Peterman	October 12, 2008	230	4.4

=== Season 3 (2008–10) ===
No. overall	No. in season	Title	Directed by	Written by	Original release date	Prod. code	Viewers (millions)
56	1	"He Ain't a Hottie, He's My Brother"	Rich Correll	Steven James Meyer	November 2, 2008	302	5.5
57	2	"Ready, Set, Don't Drive"	Rich Correll	Jay J. Demopoulos	November 9, 2008	301	4.9
58	3	"Don't Go Breaking My Tooth"	Rich Correll	Michael Poryes	November 16, 2008	303	4.6
59	4	"You Never Give Me My Money"	Roger S. Christiansen	Andrew Green	November 23, 2008	305	4.6
60	5	"Killing Me Softly with His Height"	Rich Correll	Steven Peterman	December 14, 2008	306	3.8
61	6	"Would I Lie to You, Lilly?"	Shelley Jensen	Michael Poryes	January 11, 2009	308	3.7
62	7	"You Gotta Lose This Job"	Steve Zuckerman	Heather Wordham	February 16, 2009	307	4.4
63	8	"Welcome to the Bungle"	Shelley Jensen	Steven Peterman	March 1, 2009	309	4.1
64	9	"Papa's Got a Brand New Friend"	Shelley Jensen	Maria Brown-Gallenberg	March 8, 2009	310	4.2
65	10	"Cheat It"	Shannon Flynn	Jay J. Demopoulos & Steven James Meyer	March 15, 2009	311	4.4
66	11	"Knock Knock Knockin' on Jackson's Head"	Rich Correll	Andrew Green	March 22, 2009	312	4.5
67	12	"You Give Lunch a Bad Name"	Rich Correll	Heather Wordham	March 29, 2009	314	3.4
68	13	"What I Don't Like About You"	Rich Correll	Douglas Lieblein	April 19, 2009	315	4.8
69	14	"Promma Mia"	Rich Correll	Heather Wordham	May 3, 2009	320	4.5
70	15	"Once, Twice, Three Times Afraidy"	Shannon Flynn	Jay J. Demopoulos & Steven James Meyer	May 17, 2009	317	3.4
71	16	"Jake... Another Little Piece of My Heart"	Roger S. Christiansen	Douglas Lieblein	June 7, 2009	304	4.1
72	17	"Miley Hurt the Feelings of the Radio Star"	Rich Correll	Maria Brown-Gallenberg	June 14, 2009	313	3.5
73	18	"He Could Be the One"	Rich Correll	Maria Brown-Gallenberg & Heather Wordham	July 5, 2009 (Note: These episodes originally aired as a single double-length episode but are sometimes split into two episodes for syndication, reruns, streaming and DVD presentation.)	326–327	8.0
74	19	"Super(stitious) Girl" (Note: Part 3 of "Wizards on Deck with Hannah Montana")	Rich Correll	Michael Poryes & Steven Peterman	July 17, 2009	316	9.3
75	20	"I Honestly Love You (No, Not You)"	Shannon Flynn	Andrew Green	July 26, 2009	318	3.9
76	21	"For (Give) a Little Bit"	Rich Correll	Maria Brown-Gallenberg	August 9, 2009	319	N/A
77	22	"B-B-B-Bad to the Chrome"	Shannon Flynn	Jay J. Demopoulos & Steven James Meyer	August 23, 2009	322	4.0
78	23	"Uptight (Oliver's Alright)"	Art Manke	Sally Lapiduss	September 20, 2009 (Note: Originally produced as "No Sugar, Sugar", this episode was scheduled to air in the U.S. on November 2, 2008, as the Season 2 finale, but was withdrawn from the airing schedule after parents who viewed an on-demand version complained that the depiction of diabetes was inaccurate. The episode was re-written, re-filmed, and aired as "Uptight (Oliver's Alright)" on September 20, 2009.)	223	5.0
79	24	"Judge Me Tender"	Bob Koherr	Andrew Green	October 18, 2009	323	5.7
80	25	"Can't Get Home to You Girl"	Bob Koherr	Tom Seeley	November 8, 2009	324	N/A
81	26	"Come Fail Away"	Rich Correll	Douglas Lieblein	December 6, 2009	325	N/A
82	27	"Got to Get Her Out of My House"	Rich Correll	Douglas Lieblein	January 10, 2010	321	3.9
83	28	"The Wheel Near My Bed (Keeps on Turnin')"	Bob Koherr	Jay J. Demopoulos & Steven James Meyer	February 21, 2010	328	4.5
84	29	"Miley Says Goodbye? Part 1"	Rich Correll	Michael Poryes & Steven Peterman	March 7, 2010	329	7.0
85	30	"Miley Says Goodbye? Part 2"	Rich Correll	Michael Poryes & Steven Peterman	March 14, 2010 (Note: This part was available first on the Miley Says Goodbye? DVD that was released on March 9, 2010. The DVD includes the hour-long special, "He Could Be the One" with an alternate ending. The whole episode premiered in Greece on ERT (ET1) on December 21, 2009.)	330	7.6

=== Season 4: Forever (2010–11) ===
No. overall	No. in season	Title	Directed by	Written by	Original release date	Prod. code	Viewers (millions)
86	1	"Sweet Home Hannah Montana"	Bob Koherr	Michael Poryes & Steven Peterman	July 11, 2010	402	5.7
87	2	"Hannah Montana to the Principal's Office"	Bob Koherr	Steven James Meyer	July 18, 2010	401	5.4
88	3	"California Screamin'"	Bob Koherr	Jay J. Demopoulos	July 25, 2010	403	4.2
89	4	"De-Do-Do-Do, Da-Don't-Don't-Don't Tell My Secret!"	Adam Weissman	Andrew Green	August 1, 2010	404	5.7
90	5	"It's the End of the Jake as We Know It"	Shannon Flynn	Maria Brown-Gallenberg	August 8, 2010	405	4.7
91	6	"Been Here All Along"	Adam Weissman	Douglas Lieblein	August 22, 2010	407	4.6
92	7	"Love That Lets Go"	Adam Weissman	Heather Wordham	September 12, 2010	406	4.5
93	8	"Hannah's Gonna Get This"	Bob Koherr	Story by : Donna Jatho; Teleplay by : Steven James Meyer	October 3, 2010	408	4.1
94	9	"I'll Always Remember You"	Bob Koherr & Shannon Flynn	Andrew Green & Maria Brown-Gallenberg	November 7, 2010 (Note: This episode was first released in Who is Hannah Montana? DVD on November 2, 2010.) (Note: These episodes originally aired as a single double-length episode but are sometimes split into two episodes for syndication, reruns, streaming and DVD presentation.)	409–410	7.1
95	10	"Can You See the Real Me?"	John D'Incecco	Douglas Lieblein	December 5, 2010	411	4.9
96	11	"Kiss It All Goodbye"	Shannon Flynn	Story by : Edward C. Evans; Teleplay by : Jay J. Demopoulos	December 19, 2010	412	4.2
97	12	"I Am Mamaw, Hear Me Roar!"	Bob Koherr	Heather Wordham	January 9, 2011	413	4.3
98	13	"Wherever I Go"	Bob Koherr	Michael Poryes & Steven Peterman	January 16, 2011	414–415	6.2

== Ratings ==
Hannah Montana : U.S. viewers per episode (millions)

Season	Episode number																													
Season	1	2	3	4	5	6	7	8	9	10	11	12	13	14	15	16	17	18	19	20	21	22	23	24	25	26	27	28	29	30
1	5.4	4.0	N/A	3.9	N/A	N/A	N/A	N/A	3.7	N/A	N/A	7.1	N/A	N/A	N/A	N/A	N/A	N/A	N/A	N/A	N/A	N/A	N/A	3.7	4.4	N/A	–			
2	3.5	3.5	3.9	3.7	3.5	3.5	3.8	N/A	7.4	7.4	N/A	5.1	4.5	4.8	4.7	10.7	5.1	5.4	5.5	4.4	4.2	3.6	3.1	5.1	3.8	4.6	3.9	4.6	4.4	–
3	5.5	4.9	4.6	4.6	3.8	3.7	4.4	4.1	4.2	4.4	4.5	3.4	4.8	4.5	3.4	4.1	3.5	7.9	9.3	3.9	N/A	4.0	5.0	5.7	N/A	N/A	3.9	4.5	7.0	7.6
4	5.7	5.4	4.2	5.7	4.7	4.6	4.5	4.1	7.1	4.9	4.2	4.3	6.2	–																

Audience measurement performed by Nielsen Media Research

== See also ==
- List of That's So Raven episodes – includes "Checkin' Out", part one of 'That's So Suite Life of Hannah Montana' crossover
- List of The Suite Life of Zack & Cody episodes – includes "That's So Suite Life of Hannah Montana", part two of crossover with the same name
- List of Wizards of Waverly Place episodes – includes "Cast-Away (To Another Show)", part one of 'Wizards on Deck with Hannah Montana' crossover
- List of The Suite Life on Deck episodes – includes "Double-Crossed", part two of 'Wizards on Deck with Hannah Montana' crossover
