= List of the most-viewed Disney Channel original series episodes =

This is a list of the most viewed Disney Channel original series episodes. All episodes in this list must have reached more than 5 million viewers in their premiere. Hannah Montana, starring Miley Cyrus, holds the record for most viewed Disney Channel teen sitcom episode (10.7 million viewers in August 2007), and also holds the record for the Disney Channel original series with most episodes on the list with 22 episodes total. This is followed by the series The Suite Life on Deck, which has 9 total and then both Wizards of Waverly Place and Sonny with a Chance which are tied with 8 each on the list.

The most viewed Disney Channel episode (for both an animated show and overall) is Rollercoaster from the series Phineas and Ferb which received 10.8 million viewers on August 17, 2007. Additionally, the Phineas and Ferb episode Rollercoaster and the Hannah Montana episode Me and Mr. Jonas and Mr. Jonas and Mr. Jonas both premiered after High School Musical 2, which gained 17.3 million viewers during its premiere, the most in Disney Channel history.

== List of the most viewed Disney Channel original series episodes ==
Rank	Episodes	Series	Original air date	Viewers (in millions)
1	"Rollercoaster"	Phineas and Ferb	August 17, 2007	10.800
2	"Me and Mr. Jonas and Mr. Jonas and Mr. Jonas"	Hannah Montana	August 17, 2007	10.710
3	"Who Will Be the Family Wizard"	Wizards of Waverly Place	January 6, 2012	9.755
4	"Cast-Away (To Another Show)"/"Double-Crossed"/"Super(stitious) Girl" (Wizards on Deck with Hannah Montana)	The Suite Life on Deck/Wizards of Waverly Place/Hannah Montana	July 17, 2009	9.292
5	"He Could Be The One"	Hannah Montana	July 5, 2009	8.0
6	"Miley Says Goodbye? Part 2"	Hannah Montana	March 14, 2010	7.6
6	"Lost At Sea"	The Suite Life on Deck	October 2, 2009	7.6
6	"New Kid in The Town"	Cory in the House	January 12, 2007	7.6
7	"Special Delivery"	Good Luck Charlie	June 24, 2012	7.5
8	"Achy Jakey Heart"	Hannah Montana	June 24, 2007	7.4
9	"Star Wars"	Jessie	January 6, 2012	7.32
10	"Snow Show (Part 1)"	Good Luck Charlie	January 16, 2011	7.24
11	"I'll Always Remember You"	Hannah Montana	November 7, 2010	7.1
11	"On the Road Again?"	Hannah Montana	July 28, 2006	7.1
11	"Twister: Part 3"	The Suite Life on Deck	January 16, 2011	7.1
12	"Miley Says Goodbye? Part 1"	Hannah Montana	March 7, 2010	7.0
13	"That's So Suite Life of Hannah Montana"	The Suite Life of Zack & Cody/Hannah Montana/That's So Raven	July 28, 2006	6.9
14	"Walk a Mile in My Pants"	Sonny with a Chance	March 14, 2010	6.3
15	"Wizards vs. Werewolves"	Wizards of Waverly Place	January 22, 2010	6.2
15	"Start It Up"	Shake It Up	November 7, 2010	6.2
15	"Wherever I Go"	Hannah Montana	January 16, 2011	6.2
16	"Sonny With a Secret"	Sonny With a Chance	July 18, 2010	6.1
17	"Paint by Committee"	Wizards of Waverly Place	June 26, 2009	6.0
18	"Crazy 10-Minute Sale"	Wizards of Waverly Place	October 12, 2007	5.9
19	"Good Luck Jessie: NYC Christmas"	Good Luck Charlie/Jessie	November 29, 2013	5.79
20	"Twin-a-Rooney"	Liv and Maddie	July 19, 2013	5.78
21	"Checkin' Out"	That's So Raven	July 28, 2006	5.7
21	"Super Twins"	The Suite Life of Zack & Cody	July 13, 2007	5.7
21	"The Suite Life Sets Sail"	The Suite Life on Deck	September 26, 2008	5.7
21	"Judge Me Tender"	Hannah Montana	October 18, 2009	5.7
21	"Sweet Home Hannah Montana"	Hannah Montana	July 11, 2010	5.7
21	"De-Do-Do-Do, Da-Don't-Don't-Don't Tell My Secret"	Hannah Montana	August 1, 2010	5.7
21	"New Girl"	Sonny with a Chance	January 2, 2011	5.7
22	"Rockers & Writers"	Austin & Ally	December 2, 2011	5.66
23	"Where There's Smoke"	That's So Raven	November 10, 2007	5.5
23	"Lilly's Mom Has Got It Goin' On"	Hannah Montana	November 10, 2007	5.5
23	"He Ain't A Hottie, He's My Brother"	Hannah Montana	November 2, 2008	5.5
23	"Random Acts of Disrespect"	Sonny with a Chance	May 16, 2010	5.5
23	"Grady with a Chance of Sonny"	Sonny with a Chance	May 23, 2010	5.5
23	"That's What Friends Are For?"	Hannah Montana	October 19, 2007	5.5
24	"Lilly, Do You Want to Know a Secret?"	Hannah Montana	March 24, 2006	5.4
24	"High School Miserable"	Sonny with a Chance	April 18, 2010	5.4
24	"Hannah Montana to the Principal's Office"	Hannah Montana	July 18, 2010	5.4
25	"Sleepwalk this Way"	Hannah Montana	July 7, 2007	5.3
25	"Mom and Dad on Deck"	The Suite Life on Deck	February 20, 2009	5.3
25	"Sonny in the Kitchen with Dinner"	Sonny with a Chance	August 16, 2009	5.3
26	"Prank'd"	Sonny with a Chance	July 5, 2009	5.2
26	"Crossing Jordin"	The Suite Life on Deck	October 23, 2009	5.2
26	"Phineas and Ferb Christmas Vacation"	Phineas and Ferb	December 6, 2009 (Disney XD) December 11, 2009 (Disney Channel)	5.2
26	"Any Given Fantasy"	The Suite Life on Deck	January 18, 2010 (Disney XD) January 22, 2010 (Disney Channel)	5.2
26	"Twister: Part 2"	The Suite Life on Deck	January 15, 2011	5.2
27	"Girl Meets World"	Girl Meets World	June 27, 2014	5.16
28	"Hizzouse Party"	That's So Raven	June 6, 2005	5.1
28	"When You Wish You Were The Star"	Hannah Montana	July 14, 2007	5.1
28	"Who's the Boss?"	The Suite Life of Zack & Cody	July 22, 2007	5.1
28	"Don't Stop 'Til You Get The Phone"	Hannah Montana	September 21, 2007	5.1
28	"You Didn't Say It Was Your Birthday"	Hannah Montana	July 6, 2008	5.1
28	"Parrot Island"	The Suite Life on Deck	September 27, 2008	5.1
28	"Wizards Vs. Angels"	Wizards of Waverly Place	February 18, 2011	5.1
29	"Chef-Man and Raven"	That's So Raven	June 8, 2005	5.0
29	"Uptight (Oliver's Alright)"	Hannah Montana	September 20, 2009	5.0
29	"Wizards Vs. Vampires on Waverly Place"	Wizards of Waverly Place	July 24, 2009	5.0
29	"Wizards Vs. Vampires: Dream Date"	Wizards of Waverly Place	August 7, 2009	5.0
29	"Kit and Kaboodle"	Good Luck Charlie	July 11, 2010	5.0
29	"Teddy's Little Helper"	Good Luck Charlie	August 1, 2010	5.0
