= Hannah Montana season 4 =

Hannah Montana
- Season 4
- DVD cover
- Starring: Miley Cyrus; Emily Osment; Jason Earles; Moises Arias; Billy Ray Cyrus
- No. of episodes: 13

Release
- Original network: Disney Channel
- Original release: July 11, 2010 – January 16, 2011

Season chronology
- ← Previous; Season 3

The fourth and final season of the television series Hannah Montana (marketed as Hannah Montana Forever) began airing on Disney Channel on July 11, 2010. In this season, Mitchel Musso's character Oliver Oken becomes a recurring character, and is no longer in the main cast due to Musso preparing for the Disney XD series Pair of Kings. This is the only season of the show to be broadcast in high-definition. The season ended on January 16, 2011.

The fourth and final season of the series was released on DVD on March 8, 2011.

== Production ==
Disney Channel renewed the series for a fourth season on June 1, 2009 along with a second season for Sonny with a Chance. Production began on January 18, 2010, and ended on May 14, 2010.

== Casting ==
In season 4, Mitchel Musso was not a part of the main cast; he appeared instead in a recurring role. On March 3, 2010, some guest stars were identified. They include Ray Liotta, Angus T. Jones, Sheryl Crow, and Christine Taylor. Another role that has been introduced is a girlfriend for Jackson, portrayed by Tammin Sursok.

Recurring and guest cast include: Tammin Sursok as Siena, Cody Linley as Jake, Dolly Parton as Aunt Dolly, Vicki Lawrence as Mamaw Ruthie, Shanica Knowles and Anna Maria Perez de Taglé as Amber and Ashley, and Drew Roy as Jesse.

== Cast ==
=== Main ===
- Miley Cyrus as Miley Stewart
- Emily Osment as Lilly Truscott
- Jason Earles as Jackson Stewart
- Moises Arias as Rico Suave
- Billy Ray Cyrus as Robby Ray Stewart

=== Special guest star ===
- Mitchel Musso as Oliver Oken

== Music ==
"Are You Ready", "Ordinary Girl", "I'm Still Good", and "Gonna Get This" were used to promote season four of Hannah Montana. The soundtrack was released on October 19, 2010.

== Episodes ==
- This season was filmed from January 18 to May 14, 2010.
- Mitchel Musso is no longer a main cast member; he makes a guest appearance in two episodes.

No. overall	No. in season	Title	Directed by	Written by	Original release date	Prod. code	Viewers (millions)
86	1	"Sweet Home Hannah Montana"	Bob Koherr	Michael Poryes & Steven Peterman	July 11, 2010	402	5.7
The Stewarts move into their new home when Miley and Lilly realize that Robby has moved Miley's old bedroom furniture, including white bunk beds, pink walls, pink bedding, dolls, a stuffed unicorn and Rainbow Piggy, and they set out to make some changes. But Miley didn’t want Lilly to tell her how to feel about her bedroom so she accepts her bedroom the way it is. Meanwhile Jackson must please his obnoxious neighbor TJ to get close to TJ's cousin, Siena who lives next door.
87	2	"Hannah Montana to the Principal's Office"	Bob Koherr	Steven James Meyer	July 18, 2010	401	5.4
When Miley doesn't get registered for school in time, Principal Luger (Ray Liotta) makes an exception to Hannah getting registered, which then fixes the problem. However, Miley realizes that having Hannah in school causes more problems and does not want to be Hannah Montana anymore. Robby Ray Stewart consoles her. Meanwhile, Jackson gets paranoid when Siena asks him out.
88	3	"California Screamin'"	Bob Koherr	Jay J. Demopoulos	July 25, 2010	403	4.2
Miley feels that Robby has sacrificed his personal life for her career, so she sets him up on a blind date with her school nurse Lori. Lori is very motherly and very kind. Meanwhile, Jackson is worried about his first kiss with Siena because Rico said that's the only reason she hasn't broken up with him.
89	4	"De-Do-Do-Do, Da-Don't-Don't-Don't Tell My Secret!"	Adam Weissman	Andrew Green	August 1, 2010	404	5.7
Miley almost blows her cover when she returns from a Hannah Montana function (a fashion designer meeting) and Siena spots her, and becomes suspicious that Jackson is seeing another girl so Jackson begs Miley to tell her the truth. After Siena almost catches Miley as Hannah Montana twice, she agrees to tell Siena, but backs down. After Siena eventually believes Jackson is cheating on her with Hannah Montana, Miley finally comes clean and tells the truth. Meanwhile, Robby goes fishing with Rico to teach him how to relax.
90	5	"It's the End of the Jake as We Know It"	Shannon Flynn	Maria Brown-Gallenberg	August 8, 2010	405	4.7
When Oliver comes to visit, he brings a secret about Jake with him: he cheated on Miley. After Jake arrives, Lilly and Oliver attempt to hide the truth from Miley so she can focus on her holiday sketches. She later finds out when a kid overhears Oliver and Lilly talk about Jake. The kid then blabs it out when Miley is around, leading Oliver to show her the picture of Jake with another girl. After an intense sketch with Jake, Miley finally ends it with him. Meanwhile, Jackson pretends to be Rico's father for two-thousand dollars so he can get money to see Siena modeling in Peru.
91	6	"Been Here All Along"	Adam Weissman	Douglas Lieblein	August 22, 2010	407	4.6
Miley cancels a special father-daughter afternoon with her dad to go on a first date with Jesse instead. She gets mad when Jesse answers a phone call from his father because she blew off her father to spend time with him, but Jesse tells her that his dad is stationed in Afghanistan and they hardly ever get to talk. Miley then realizes how blessed she is to still have her dad, and goes home to apologize and tells him that she's grateful to have him. Robby Ray and Miley embrace warmly. In honor of those in the military and their families who don't have the fortune of having them home, she holds a concert as Hannah in support of them. Absent: Moisés Arias as Rico
92	7	"Love That Lets Go"	Adam Weissman	Heather Wordham	September 12, 2010	406	4.5
Miley and Lilly make a deal, if Miley climbs a rope at school, Lilly will ride Blue Jeans. When Lilly rides Blue Jeans, she falls off and breaks her leg, and Blue Jeans is scared off and bitten by a snake. Lilly and Robby Ray comfort Miley when Blue Jeans does not stand up. Siena gives Jackson her favorite book, To Kill a Mockingbird to read, however, he becomes distracted by wrestling magazines, and John Cena appears to convince Jackson to read the book. In the end, after much worrying from Miley, Blue Jeans stands up, and Jackson confesses to Siena that he did not read the book, only for her to say they both are going to read the book together. Absent: Moisés Arias as Rico
93	8	"Hannah's Gonna Get This"	Bob Koherr	Story by : Donna Jatho; Teleplay by : Steven James Meyer	October 3, 2010	408	4.1
Hannah must write a new song for her upcoming album before Friday. She writes a song that her director doesn't like. He finds 10 Hannah fans and asks them if they like the song. Most of them don't, so Hannah makes Lilly dress up as a kid and try and convince them. Hannah realizes that it is her career and she wants to do the song even if there are some negative comments. In the end she ends up having the song as a duet with Iyaz as he really wants to sing it. Meanwhile, Jackson sees that Rico has a mustache and he tries to grow one too. After several failed attempts Jackson admits that he can't grow one, but after doing some research reveals that everyone in Rico's family who has or had a mustache ended up bald much to Rico's horror.
94	9	"I'll Always Remember You"	Bob Koherr & Shannon Flynn	Andrew Green & Maria Brown-Gallenberg	November 7, 2010 (Note: This episode was first released in Who is Hannah Montana? DVD on November 2, 2010.) (Note: These episodes originally aired as a single double-length episode but are sometimes split into two episodes for syndication, reruns, streaming and DVD presentation.)	409–410	7.1
Miley's secret becomes a problem. Her boyfriend Jesse reveals he knows her secret just by paying attention, and on the Jay Leno show Jesse plants a light kiss on Hannah's cheek, giving the impression that the two are dating. At the beach, Jesse hugs Miley and the world grows upset at him because they think he is cheating on Hannah, not knowing the two girls are the same person. This upsets Jesse, and the two separate. Miley and Lilly get their college acceptance letters, but Miley didn't get into Stanford because she didn't have enough extracurricular activities, due to being busy as Hannah. She fails to get in with Hannah's help, so Lilly opts to stay out of college for the year, until Miley gets in. Miley, through help of her conscience Hannah, realizes what her friends are doing for her secret. After looking back at all her Hannah clothing, and remembering scenes from past episodes, she goes back on the Jay Leno show and reveals to the world her secret and sings a song as Miley for the first time.
95	10	"Can You See the Real Me?"	John D'Incecco	Douglas Lieblein	December 5, 2010	411	4.9
Miley is interviewed by Robin Roberts after revealing she is Hannah Montana. Miley discusses her double life and relives some of her most memorable moments about her friends, her family, her dating life, and how she was able to manage two lives. But she tells the truth that she would rather just be authentically Miley than to live a double life. Absent: Emily Osment as Lilly Truscott, Jason Earles as Jackson Stewart, Moisés Arias as Rico, Billy Ray Cyrus as Robby Ray Stewart
96	11	"Kiss It All Goodbye"	Shannon Flynn	Story by : Edward C. Evans; Teleplay by : Jay J. Demopoulos	December 19, 2010	412	4.2
Miley discovers the consequences after she revealed she was Hannah Montana, as critics and parents alike have negative thoughts about the shocking news. When Aunt Dolly asks Miley to join her on stage, Miley fears she can never perform again. After Robby Ray gets the courage to get back on stage, Miley decides to kiss her fears of rejection goodbye, finally accepting that she’d rather be just Miley. Meanwhile, Rico suffers a breakdown because he never realized that Miley is Hannah Montana, and Jackson and Lilly help him recover.
97	12	"I Am Mamaw, Hear Me Roar!"	Bob Koherr	Heather Wordham	January 9, 2011	413	4.3
When graduation day arrives, Mamaw is disappointed that she couldn't even get a picture with Miley because of her fans. When fans begin to surround Miley, Mamaw becomes distraught that her granddaughter is caring more about her fans than her own grandmother, but Miley says that is not true! No longer tolerating her grandmother’s attitude and behavior, poor Miley feels very hurt and no longer wants any fans at all. She doesn’t want to be Hannah Montana anymore. She wishes her Mom was still alive. Meanwhile, Rico tricks Jackson into saying that he wouldn't be into Siena if she had short hair.
98	13	"Wherever I Go"	Bob Koherr	Michael Poryes & Steven Peterman	January 16, 2011	414–415	6.2
Miley gets a movie offer from Steven Spielberg and Tom Cruise, which shoots in Paris and will take a year away from her, which would make it incapable of going to college with her best friend. She keeps this from Lilly, and tries to get Lilly to come to the decision of not wanting to go to college with Miley. Finally, Miley reveals the movie to Lilly, and Lilly gets upset. Lilly and Miley have a very bad falling out. Meanwhile, Jackson struggles to keep up with his girlfriend's lifestyle. Distraught, Miley and Jackson discuss their dilemmas. Jackson suggests that Miley should have asked for Lilly to join her in Paris. Miley then asks for Lilly to come with her to Paris, and they both decide to go to Paris together. Rico finds Jackson a dream job, and Rico and Jackson finally reveal that while they may fight, they are also close friends. Later, Siena comments on how unsettling the banter between Jackson and Miley can be to hear, but Jackson explains that is how they show their affection. Miley and Lilly's respective boyfriends meet up with them at the airport to see them before their trip. Oliver gives Lilly some key words which force her to second guess her decision. Before getting onto the plane, Lilly tells Miley that she has decided to go to college, without Miley. Miley and Lilly begin their lives apart. Lily is studying in her dorm when she gets a knock on her door. She opens the door to reveal Miley, who declares "I'm Miley, I'm your new roommate." The two hug, and then a montage of images from the course of the show is displayed throughout the credits.

== International release ==
Country / Region	Network(s)	Series premiere	Notes	References
Asia	Disney Channel Asia	August 9, 2010	Sneak peek episode aired as part of a Superstar Monday Lineup	
Australia	Disney Channel	August 20, 2010	Ended March 5, 2011.	
Germany	Disney Channel Germany	October 7, 2010	11 episodes aired	
Germany	Super RTL	February 19, 2011		
