= Wherever I Go (Hannah Montana) =

- Hannah Montana episode
- Episode no.: Season 4 Episode 13
- Directed by: Bob Koherr
- Written by: Michael Poryes; Steven Peterman
- Cinematography by: Alan Keath Walker
- Editing by: Kenny Tintorri
- Production code: 414-415
- Original air date: January 16, 2011
- Running time: 51 minutes

Guest appearances
- Shanica Knowles as Amber Addison; Natalie Lander as Annie; Mitchel Musso as Oliver Oken; Anna Maria Perez de Taglé as Ashley Dewitt; Drew Roy as Jesse; Tammin Sursok as Siena; Robert Towers as Albert Einstein

Episode chronology
← Previous "I Am Mamaw, Hear Me Roar!"	Next → —
- Hannah Montana season 4

"Wherever I Go" is the series finale of the Disney Channel sitcom series Hannah Montana. It was written by the show's executive producers, Michael Poryes and Steven Peterman. It originally aired on January 16, 2011, in the United States on the Disney Channel, and later aired in Canada on March 18, 2011, on the Family Channel. The episode title is a reference to the Hannah Montana song "Wherever I Go".

The episode also marks Mitchel Musso's second and final appearance as Oliver Oken in the show's fourth season.

== Plot ==
Miley gets an offer from Steven Spielberg and Tom Cruise to star in a movie. However, filming will take place in Paris for a year, making her incapable of going to college with her best friend, Lilly.

She keeps this from Lilly, and tries to get Lilly to come to the decision of not wanting to go to college with Miley, when they drive to Stanford University for a weekend orientation. Lilly, however, is just happy to be able to go to school with her best friend.

Finally, Miley reveals the movie deal to Lilly, and they get into an argument, where Lilly says to Miley that she would never want to go anywhere with her again. On the car ride home, Lilly further declares that she is moving back in with her father. Distraught, Miley discusses her dilemma with Jackson, and he suggests that Miley should ask Lilly to join her in Paris. Miley realizes that the real reason Lilly was upset was because they have done everything together, so Miley then asks for Lilly to come with her to Paris, and they both decide to go to Paris together.

Miley and Lilly's respective boyfriends, Jesse and Oliver, meet up with them at the airport to see them before their trip. Oliver gives Lilly some key words that force her to second guess her decision. Before getting onto the plane, Lilly tells Miley that she has decided to go to college after all, even if it means being without Miley. Miley and Lilly begin their lives apart backed by a duet sung by the two actresses.

The music eventually centers in Lilly's dorm where she gets a knock on her door. She opens the door to reveal Miley, who declares herself as Lilly's new roommate. Miley confesses that she turned down the movie and chose to put her music and acting career on hold because she did not want to miss out on her one chance to go to college with her best friend. Miley and Lilly hug as the camera pans away from them towards a collage of their mementos together.

During the credits, a montage of images from the course of the show is displayed, set to the song "I'll Always Remember You", marking the end of the series.

=== Subplot ===
Jackson struggles to keep up with his girlfriend Siena's bikini model lifestyle, as he feels inadequate in comparison. He makes several attempts at jobs to receive more money to buy Siena a nice gift, including demonstrating a snake, and working for Rico again. When he buys her a nice necklace, she buys him a car. Distraught, Jackson discusses his dilemma with Miley, and she gives him a pep talk.

Rico realizes he likes Jackson, and finds him a dream job, as a video game tester. Rico and Jackson finally admit that while they may fight, they are also close friends.

Later, while Jackson is working from a hot tub, Siena comments on how the banter between Jackson and Miley comes off as mean, but Jackson explains to her that it is simply how they show their affection.

=== Alternate ending ===
Included in the Hannah Montana Forever: Final Season DVD was an alternate ending to the episode. The alternate ending picks up from the airport scene, where Miley and Lilly say their goodbyes as Lilly goes to Stanford and Miley goes to Paris to work with Spielberg and Cruise. The camera then pans away from Miley and Lilly hugging and zooms onto a little girl sitting in a chair, holding a Hannah Montana doll.

The scene transitions to twelve years earlier in Tennessee, where a young girl portraying young Miley Cyrus plays with a Barbie doll and sings about herself becoming a famous rockstar. Miley's real-life parents, Billy Ray Cyrus and Tish Cyrus, walk into the room, tell her that it is past her bedtime and tuck her in. Tish tells Miley that as long as she keeps believing in herself, she can do anything she wants to do and Billy Ray tells Miley that someday her dream will come true. The scene eventually shifts into a photograph of the real life Miley and her parents, suggesting that like Miley Stewart, Miley Cyrus imagined herself being famous one day and her dream indeed came true.

== Production ==
This episode was taped at Sunset Bronson Studios, similar to the show's other episodes.

== Cast ==
=== Main ===
- Miley Cyrus as Miley Stewart
- Emily Osment as Lilly Truscott
- Jason Earles as Jackson Stewart
- Moises Arias as Rico Suave
- Billy Ray Cyrus as Robby Stewart/Himself in alternate ending

=== Guest stars ===
- Drew Roy as Jesse
- Tammin Sursok as Siena
- Shanica Knowles as Amber Addison
- Anna Maria Perez de Taglé as Ashley Dewitt
- Tug Coker as Reptile Wrangler
- Julia Cho as Luna
- Mitchel Musso as Oliver Oken
- Robert Towers as Albert Einstein
- Natalie Lander as Annie
- Liz Eldridge as French Woman
- Gina Meyer as Gina
- Michael Icenogle as Delivery Guy
- Mary-Charles Jones as Young Miley Cyrus in alternate ending
- Tish Cyrus as herself in alternate ending

== Reception ==
The special one-hour series finale was seen by 6.2 million viewers, ranked as Cable's No. 1 Series of the Year Among Kids 6-11 and Teens 9-14 for 3 of the Past 5 Years, and also Most-Watched Audience Built Each Season in Total Viewers and Kids 6–11. Also this was the second most-watched episode in Hannah Montana's 4th season, only after the one-hour episode, "I'll Always Remember You".

The episode received not only a large audience, but also positive reviews for the series finale. Part I currently holds a 7.4 making "Good" rating (based on 35 votes) and Part II currently holds an 8.5 making "Great" rating (based on 45 votes) on TV.com. The episode aired in the UK on 27 May 2011 and was watched by 621,000 viewers.

== Cultural references ==
This episode has several cultural references. Miley Stewart's "say what" catch phrase, said after she gets her movie offer, includes a long list of Steven Spielberg's films and also mentions Tom Cruise and the Mission: Impossible trilogy. The movie's plot line is similar to Miley Cyrus's movie So Undercover.

Other references include The Muppets, Albert Einstein, singer Pink, McDonald's, Hannah Montana: The Movie, and the novel The Last Song by Nicholas Sparks, on which the film The Last Song, starring Cyrus, is based.

== Music ==
"Wherever I Go" featured the following songs:

- "True Friend" by Hannah Montana
- "Barefoot Cinderella" by Miley Cyrus as Hannah Montana
- "Kiss It Goodbye" by Miley Cyrus
- "Wherever I Go" by Miley Cyrus and Emily Osment
- "I'll Always Remember You" by Miley Cyrus
