= Hannah Montana season 3 =

Season of television series

Hannah Montana
- Season 3
- DVD cover
- Starring: Miley Cyrus; Emily Osment; Mitchel Musso; Jason Earles; Moises Arias; Billy Ray Cyrus
- No. of episodes: 30

Release
- Original network: Disney Channel
- Original release: November 2, 2008 – March 14, 2010

Season chronology
- ← Previous; Season 2 Next → Season 4

The third season of American show Disney Channel teen sitcom Hannah Montana aired from November 2, 2008, until March 14, 2010. Filming for the season started a day after the 2008 Teen Choice Awards on August 5, 2008. The third season of Hannah Montana focuses on how the characters grow up than the previous seasons. Hannah has grown up into a new look. Different from the previous two seasons, she has shorter hair and an untraditional style which includes a lot of zebra print and unique boots. Oliver and Lilly start dating starting from the episode "What I Don't Like About You". Later, Lilly moves in with the Stewarts. At the end of the season, the Stewarts and Lilly move from Malibu while Oliver prepares to go on tour with a band. This is the last season to be broadcast in standard-definition.

== Production ==
Disney Channel renewed the series for a third season in April 2008, which was filmed from August 2008 to June 2009.

== Casting ==
Season 3 cast L-R: Jason Earles, Emily Osment, Miley Cyrus, Mitchel Musso, Moisés Arias

The main cast of season 3 remained the same as the previous season. Hayley Chase, Romi Dames, David Koechner, and Cody Linley all reprised their roles as Joannie, Traci Van Horn, Uncle Earl, and Jake Ryan, respectively, in at least one episode. Recurring character from the second season Mikayla, played by Selena Gomez, did not make an appearance in any episode of this season. Also, Roxy Roker, played by Frances Callier, was omitted despite an episode in season 2 emphasizing her importance to Miley/Hannah after working for the president and a major part in the season 2 finale, "We're All on This Date Together". Aunt Dolly, played by Dolly Parton, also makes no appearances in this season. This is the final season where Mitchel Musso is a regular cast member.

== Music ==
The new version of "The Best of Both Worlds" was used both for the movie as well as for the opening sequence, and was sung at the Hannah Montana season 3 concert in 2008. This version is extended to 59 seconds. The full version is featured on the Hannah Montana: The Movie soundtrack but is not featured on the Hannah Montana 3 soundtrack.

== Episodes ==
No. overall	No. in season	Title	Directed by	Written by	Original release date	Prod. code	Viewers (millions)
56	1	"He Ain't a Hottie, He's My Brother"	Rich Correll	Steven James Meyer	November 2, 2008	302	5.5
Miley has a dream that Lilly almost kisses Jackson. When she tells Lilly, she reveals that she has a crush on him, which shocks Miley. She tells Jackson about it, and at first he thinks it's weird but then when he thinks about it he admits that he likes Lilly too. To keep them apart, Miley lies to them both that the other is not interested, which causes a rift between them. But eventually her conscience catches up with her and she admits they both like each other. Lilly and Jackson make up, but then Miley wakes up and realizes that the entire thing was a dream. When she sees Lilly, she tells her of the dream, and Lilly assures her that she has no interest in Jackson.
57	2	"Ready, Set, Don't Drive"	Rich Correll	Jay J. Demopoulos	November 9, 2008	301	4.9
Miley decides to go get her driver's license but kicks out her driving teacher because he made her new car dirty. Miley is relieved that she only told Lilly about getting her license, but Lilly also told Oliver. As a result, Oliver then tells everyone that Miley got her license first. To prove it, Miley tells everyone that she's going to drive to the beach party. Later, Miley gets her license as Hannah Montana, but is arrested by a policeman when she shows the Hannah Montana license as Miley. She must prove to the police officer that she really is Hannah Montana. The Policeman's daughter, a Hannah Montana fan, is not convinced that Miley is Hannah, until Miley sings to her. Miley's father finds out about her arrest and drives her to the beach party to embarrass her. In the end, Miley is shown to have a driving license, only to find that her photograph was also embarrassing as her father's photo. Meanwhile, Rico stays over at the Stewarts' house but he drives everyone insane.
58	3	"Don't Go Breaking My Tooth"	Rich Correll	Michael Poryes	November 16, 2008	303	4.6
When Miley realizes that she must go to the dentist because she lost a filling, she insists on going without her dad to show that she has grown up. However, her regular dentist is unavailable and she gets scared and leaves, but does not admit it to her dad. Hannah is scheduled to be a guest star on a popular food show, but tries to avoid eating anything hard. However, she eats some peanut brittle and then everyone finds out about her leaving the dentist. Meanwhile, Oliver attempts to be a vegetarian to impress Joannie, but is still obsessed with meat and Rico tries to drive him crazy by selling lots of meat and tempting him.
59	4	"You Never Give Me My Money"	Roger S. Christiansen	Andrew Green	November 23, 2008	305	4.6
Miley is excited when she asks for a raise on her allowance and her dad responds by giving her $5,000 in Hannah money and letting her open her own checking account. Because of the previous lesson she learned from her obsessive spending with her credit card ("Debt it Be", Season 1), she uses self control and buys nothing. To make sure she cannot buy anything, she gives her checkbook to Lilly. But when she sees fabulous blush, she wants her checkbook. Meanwhile, Robby knows where Jackson's missing phone is but lets Jackson go crazy to find it. In the end, Jackson finds his phone in a box of eggs.
60	5	"Killing Me Softly with His Height"	Rich Correll	Steven Peterman	December 14, 2008	306	3.8
While Christmas shopping at the mall, Miley meets Connor, a cute guy who is considerably shorter than she. She accepts his offer for a date only to spend it inadvertently yet repeatedly referencing their height differences. He ends the disastrous evening when Miley cannot bring herself to kiss him, leaving her feeling shallow yet determined to get a second chance with him. Meanwhile, Jackson and Robby bend over backwards to ignore their nasty neighbor, Mr. Dontzig, in exchange for a letter of recommendation to help Jackson get into his desired college.
61	6	"Would I Lie to You, Lilly?"	Shelley Jensen	Michael Poryes	January 11, 2009	308	3.7
A class trip to Washington, D.C., is coming up and Lilly does not have enough money for it, but she does not want Miley to give her any. So Lilly holds a yard sale to raise money for the trip, where a man buys Lilly's cap for $1000. On the train ride there, Lilly sees her cap being worn by the son of the man who bought it from her, and realizes that Miley helped her even though she did not want her help. Miley and Lilly reconcile when they are in front of the press for the president with Miley mentioning that Lilly is more of a sister than her best friend. Meanwhile, Rico hires Sarah to work at Rico's because he knows it will annoy Jackson, but realizes that he is not happy with Sarah making the shack an environmental place where they do not use cups or plates, and run on a bicycle-powered generator for the lights.
62	7	"You Gotta Lose This Job"	Steve Zuckerman	Heather Wordham	February 16, 2009	307	4.4
Oliver is upset when his band fails an audition to play at the school dance. To make matters worse, Hannah lands a role in an upcoming movie, causing Oliver to feel even more insecure. Oliver avoids Miley for a while because she always gets everything she wants. To show Oliver what an understanding friend she is, Miley decides to blow the next audition with the director, Rob Reiner, by acting like a total diva, but her plan backfires when Rob is impressed by Hannah's acting skills. Meanwhile, Rico ruins the dummy Jackson was going to use for his ventriloquist show, so Jackson uses Rico as the substitute at a birthday party performance. Rico makes Jackson look really bad in front of the kids, but they enjoy the show anyway.
63	8	"Welcome to the Bungle"	Shelley Jensen	Steven Peterman	March 1, 2009	309	4.1
When Hannah says that she dislikes carrots on the "Mack and Mickey" show, her fans stop eating them. She returns to the program to explain herself, but ends up making things worse by saying that she does not read and instead waits for the book to be made into a movie. This results in children all over the world doing the same thing. Robbie says she must return to the show to fix the problem but Miley is scared that she will mess up again so Robbie hires Jackson to help her. Miley's attempts to explain herself only result in more confusion. Miley eventually resolves the problem by telling the truth. At the end Mack surprises everyone (the crowd, the other co-host, and the crew) with his knowledge of the situation. Meanwhile, Jackson and Oliver model for a brochure but find out that they were not chosen to model for the reason they thought they were chosen. When they discover that they were chosen because they are average-looking they become angry and refuse to model any more. However, they change their minds when the photographer offers to pay them both $1,000.
64	9	"Papa's Got a Brand New Friend"	Shelley Jensen	Maria Brown-Gallenberg	March 8, 2009	310	4.2
Hannah and her dancers hire a new choreographer, Shawn Nahnah, after their regular choreographer is injured. When he turns out to be really mean, Hannah tries to fire him, only to discover that he's become friends with her father and that he also saved his life. Meanwhile, Oliver gets advice from Jackson to develop bad habits so Joannie will break up with him because she is killing him with training for a triathlon. Oliver pretends to be an alien calling the mothership. In the end, Joannie gets fed up with Oliver's new habit and tries to break up with him. But before she has the chance, he gets tired of wearing his overheating alien suit and breaks up with her.
65	10	"Cheat It"	Shannon Flynn	Jay J. Demopoulos & Steven James Meyer	March 15, 2009	311	4.4
As a publicity stunt, Hannah Montana pretends to date singer Austin Rain, who she actually hates. When Miley discovers that Jackson is planning to cheat on his history test she tries to convince him that cheating is dishonest, but he reminds her that Hannah is being dishonest by pretending to date Austin. Hannah breaks up with Austin on live television which allows her to again try to stop Jackson from cheating. Meanwhile, Robbie Ray purchases from a new sauna from a company run by Rico Called Senor Steam. His discount does not turn out to be what he expected but the sauna still proves useful when Miley finds that Jackson still intends to cheat, and has written the test answers all over his body. Lilly is enlisted to trap Miley and Jackson in the sauna so that the steam causes Jackson to sweat, melting away the answers. Jackson finally realizes that he was studying the whole time he was preparing to cheat and now knows the test answers.
66	11	"Knock Knock Knockin' on Jackson's Head"	Rich Correll	Andrew Green	March 22, 2009	312	4.5
After Miley and Jackson get into an argument with Miley's pantyhose, she ends up making him hit his head, causing Jackson to suffer temporary amnesia. Miley uses this as an opportunity to get Jackson to be nice to her, so she tricks Jackson into thinking that he was always nice to her. But after a while of him being way too over-protective towards her, Miley misses Jackson's old ways, and tries to provoke him to be mean again. Miley finds out that Jackson was faking it and that Robby was in on it as well to teach Miley that she really loves her brother the way he is. Meanwhile, Lilly reluctantly pretends to be Rico's girlfriend so he can help her with her Algebra when his competitive cousin Alejandro (Angus) (Moises Arias) visits from Australia. At the end, Lilly and Barbie (Angus' girlfriend) tell each other that they are faking to date the boys. Barbie is pretending because Angus promised her to tutor Spanish and Lilly wants a math tutor. The two are good at the subject the other is not doing well in so decided to tutor each other, leaving Rico and Angus fighting.
67	12	"You Give Lunch a Bad Name"	Rich Correll	Heather Wordham	March 29, 2009	314	3.4
Robby leaves Miley and Jackson alone when he goes to his band reunion, but just when they think they're about to have some fun, Mamaw arrives to take care of them. Unfortunately for Miley and Jackson, she "cares" to excess, with underwear checks and forcing them to use musical rolling backpacks for school instead of regular backpacks. She goes too far when she takes over the school cafeteria and Miley and Jackson try to get her to quit. In an attempt to avoid hurting her feelings, Miley and Jackson plan to have a "health inspector" visit the cafeteria. They also start to be more assertive about Mamaw’s attitude and behavior.
68	13	"What I Don't Like About You"	Rich Correll	Douglas Lieblein	April 19, 2009	315	4.8
After returning home from filming her new movie, Indiana Joannie, Miley goes to get changed but comes back and sees Lilly and Oliver kissing, leading her to realize that they are dating, but are keeping it a secret from her. She overhears them saying that they do not feel bad keeping it a secret from Miley because she did not have a problem keeping her Hannah secret from them. After revealing that she knows the secret, she claims she is okay with it but she is still uncomfortable. After arguing over what band was playing when they had their first dance and where they went on their first date, Lilly and Oliver break up, each asking Miley to choose a side. Deciding to get her friends back together, Miley makes a mini-Indiana Joannie movie that causes Lilly and Oliver to forgive each other and resume dating. Meanwhile, Jackson plans to lie to a Santa Barbara college recruiter so that he can have a better chance of getting in. Robby tries to convince him to be honest, but Jackson does not want to. Robby later tells Jackson that "Your mother would not be very proud of you right now", but Jackson still does not care. However, he finally realizes that honesty is the best policy and tells the college recruiter the truth. He then gets told he has a shot of 1 in 10,000 of going to Santa Barbara College, but he thinks it's a good thing.
69	14	"Promma Mia"	Rich Correll	Heather Wordham	May 3, 2009	320	4.5
Miley agrees to go to the prom with the school's nerd, Aaron, because nobody else wants to go with him, but she ditches him to sing a duet with David Archuleta. After guilt takes over, she realizes that she had already made a promise to be at the prom with Aaron and decides to live up to her commitment. Robby helps Jackson realize why enrolling for college is important, persuading him by making him think of what his life would be like if he does not go.
70	15	"Once, Twice, Three Times Afraidy"	Shannon Flynn	Jay J. Demopoulos & Steven James Meyer	May 17, 2009	317	3.4
Miley convinces Lilly and Oliver that she likes being single, but they keep trying to set her up with dates. When she meets Traci Van Horn's "faux beau" Adam, she decides to use him to fool her friends into thinking she has found someone she likes. Adam cancels at the last moment but sends his uncouth friend Ralphie in his place. Miley is determined to look happy in front of Lilly and Oliver but they think that Ralphie is uncouth too. Miley tries to come up with a way to get rid of him without revealing her deception. Meanwhile, Rico starts to be nice to Jackson after he causes him to be injured, but Jackson does not believe him.
71	16	"Jake... Another Little Piece of My Heart"	Roger S. Christiansen	Douglas Lieblein	June 7, 2009	304	4.1
After a concert Hannah finds Traci in Las Vegas and is shocked to find that she is planning to marry Jake. Hannah, Lilly and Robbie all try to tell them that they're too young to get married but the wedding is still going to go ahead. A horrified Hannah tries to ruin the wedding, only to find out that it was not a real one but is in fact a joke for the TV Series "Gotcha". Near the end, Hannah kisses Jake to prove that she feels nothing for him. But as soon as she is in a different room from him, makes it obvious that she enjoyed the kiss, even after denying having any feelings whatsoever for him. Meanwhile, Rico plans to ruin Jackson's date by getting some children to come and annoy Jackson. However, at the end, Jackson's date says that she thinks Jackson is good with kids, and goes in for a kiss, only to be sneezed on by Jackson.
72	17	"Miley Hurt the Feelings of the Radio Star"	Rich Correll	Maria Brown-Gallenberg	June 14, 2009	313	3.5
Oliver lands his dream job working at a Radio Station as an intern, with DJ Gary Green, but when the DJ suddenly leaves, Oliver lands a spot on the Kteen Radio station. Lilly and Miley do rock-paper-scissors to see who would help him. Miley loses, so she starts to help him out and they take calls from people needing advice. But when they become an overnight hit, Oliver asks Miley to help him out because the DJ got kicked by his wife in the delivery room while giving birth and he got injured. But Miley finds it hard to juggle both her Hannah life and keep her promise to Oliver. After collapsing while recording a Pet Adoption advert, Miley finally admits to Oliver that she is too busy to add something else to her schedule. Meanwhile, Jackson is put in charge of Rico's after Rico fears that since he is earning so much money from the Shack, his dad will sell it for a lot of money. When Jackson messes things up multiple times after trying to prove to Rico that he's not stupid enough to get the Shack bankrupt, and the Shack loses money, Rico finally becomes happy again.
73	18	"He Could Be the One"	Rich Correll	Maria Brown-Gallenberg & Heather Wordham	July 5, 2009 (Note: These episodes originally aired as a single double-length episode but are sometimes split into two episodes for syndication, reruns, streaming and DVD presentation.)	326–327	8.0
Miley repeatedly tries but fails to tell her dad that she's dating Jake Ryan again. Soon, Robby winds up believing that she's hiding something from him. To make her father thankful for Jake, she pretends to like her bad boy band mate Jesse, but gets in over her head when she starts to have feelings for him so it's up to Robby to help Miley listen to her heart and choose the guy who could "be the one." In the end, she tells Jake that she no longer dates him and tells Jesse there is just something between her and him that is special and picks Jesse after some help from a video of her mom and apparent divine intervention by her to help. Robby accepts their relationship after confirming with Miley that she made the right choice. Rico and Jackson just sing background commentary for the episode. Rico appears to know of Miley's secret while singing commentary.
74	19	"Super(stitious) Girl" (Note: Part 3 of "Wizards on Deck with Hannah Montana")	Rich Correll	Michael Poryes & Steven Peterman	July 17, 2009	316	9.3
While in her cabin on the SS Tipton, Hannah loses the anklet that her mother gave her before she died. Lola (Lilly) helps her to try to find it, but with no luck. Finally, a maid shows the anklet to Mr. Moseby, but London takes it, seeing it as valuable. When Hannah and Lola find that London has it, Hannah tries to get London to give it back to her. London does not seem to take what Hannah says until Hannah tells her that the anklet has fake diamonds. Upon hearing this, London freaks out and inadvertently throws the anklet overboard. Hannah is depressed and wonders if anything else bad could happen; it does. A storm blows her wig away and her hair dye turns her hair green instead of blonde, a rat appears on her head, and a mirror breaks. Even Hannah's rehearsal goes poorly, so she tells Cody Martin and Bailey Pickett that her concert is canceled. Miley believes the anklet is the only thing that will help her, but her father Robby tells her that the spirit of her mother is in her heart, too. He tells Miley that he always has a back-up wig and gives it to her. And then somebody who was swimming wit dolphins found the anklet and returns it to Miley. Hannah then tells Cody and Bailey the concert is back on and that they are invited to the after-party. Bailey asks Cody if that was his plan and Cody talks about a good relationship needing honesty, but lies by saying that it was his plan. Hannah's Hawaii concert goes ahead, and all is well. Meanwhile, back in at Miley's house in Malibu, a package arrives addressed to Robby. Jackson and Oliver are desperate to open it, but without tearing the box so that Robby will never find out. They ask for Rico's help to open the package, and he cleverly opens it without tearing the box. The package turns out to be a bounce house. It inflates itself, getting the boys stuck to the window for quite some time, but Rico eventually deflates it with his fingernail.
75	20	"I Honestly Love You (No, Not You)"	Shannon Flynn	Andrew Green	July 26, 2009	318	3.9
After a ski accident in Colorado, Miley ends up in the hospital and while unconscious she hears Oliver say "I love you" to her. She attempts to keep it a secret, but when Lilly informs her that she is going to announce her love to him, Miley confesses. When Lilly hears that, she bursts into tears, as a result ruining her make-up. She plots to get back at Oliver by making Lilly kiss another guy, Gill, but Oliver interrupts and says he loves Lilly. Later, he said that in the hospital he was truly practicing saying "I love you" so he could say it to Lilly.
76	21	"For (Give) a Little Bit"	Rich Correll	Maria Brown-Gallenberg	August 9, 2009	319	N/A
Miley accidentally reveals an embarrassing secret about Jackson during a live radio interview, and to make up for it, takes him to a cool party. When an embarrassing secret of her own is revealed, she blames Jackson and purposely humiliates him in front of his crush. Meanwhile, Rico asks Robby to teach him how to country line dance to impress a girl.
77	22	"B-B-B-Bad to the Chrome"	Shannon Flynn	Jay J. Demopoulos & Steven James Meyer	August 23, 2009	322	4.0
Mamaw comes to visit, driving cross-country in her old car. Miley, Jackson and Robby decide it's time to get her a new one, without realizing how attached she is to her current one. After they trade in her old car for a nice new one, Mamaw is so distraught that they try to get it back, only to find it has already been sold to the junk yard. When they're too late to save it from being scrapped, they must find a way to recreate her beloved car. However, after Mamaw realizes that they brought home a fake one, she gives in and accepts the new one. Meanwhile, business starts to suffer at Rico's after Oliver gets in a fight with Lilly for forgetting their 100th day anniversary. But after Rico writes a poem that Lilly thinks is from Oliver, she forgives him.
78	23	"Uptight (Oliver's Alright)"	Art Manke	Sally Lapiduss	September 20, 2009 (Note: Originally produced as "No Sugar, Sugar", this episode was scheduled to air in the U.S. on November 2, 2008, as the Season 2 finale, but was withdrawn from the airing schedule after parents who viewed an on-demand version complained that the depiction of diabetes was inaccurate. The episode was re-written, re-filmed, and aired as "Uptight (Oliver's Alright)" on September 20, 2009.)	223	5.0
Miley and Lilly learn that Oliver has Type 1 diabetes and decide to become his "food police" at Traci's sweet sixteen party. Oliver ends their meddling and educates them about his condition. They learn that they can support their friends no matter what the challenge. Meanwhile, Jackson is dating a smart girl called Allison, who wants to break up with him, but when Robbie finds out she wants to do that, he will try to save their relationship, because Jackson is getting good grades and Robbie wants to take him into college.
79	24	"Judge Me Tender"	Bob Koherr	Andrew Green	October 18, 2009	323	5.7
Oliver auditions for the reality show America's Top Talent while Hannah is a judge filling in for Kara DioGuardi (who has a cameo). His performance is outstanding and he becomes an overnight hit but the attention that he receives causes him to neglect Lilly. Lilly asks Miley to give him a bad review after his next performance so that he won't progress to the next round. Unfortunately for Lilly and Miley, his performance is so good that Miley is torn between her loyalty to Lilly and honesty in appraising Oliver's performance. Lilly gives Miley permission to give Oliver a good review after seeing what a struggle it is to deny his excellent performance. After the show, Miley talks to Oliver and he apologizes to Lilly. Meanwhile, Robby punishes Jackson by making him clean the attic after he receives a traffic ticket. When another ticket arrives, Robby opens it, ready to punish Jackson, when he finds out it was him who ran the red light.
80	25	"Can't Get Home to You Girl"	Bob Koherr	Tom Seeley	November 8, 2009	324	N/A
Miley tries to make Lilly's birthday perfect and has promised her that she will return from her out-of-state concert to celebrate. However, when Miley's flight is cancelled, she must find a way to keep her promise, even if it means getting help from unlikely fans of Robby Ray. One fan is obsessed and does not want to land her plane, so they jump out of the plane with parachutes. Meanwhile, Jackson is tired of hearing Lilly whine about Miley's absence, so when Rico arrives with two tickets to a basketball game, he gladly accepts but takes Lilly. In the end Lilly has a great time.
81	26	"Come Fail Away"	Rich Correll	Douglas Lieblein	December 6, 2009	325	N/A
Miley, who is trying to audition for the starring role of a cartoon duck, does not know how to make a good impression at the audition, so she gets help from Kyle, a professional voice-over actor. Meanwhile, Rico tries to make the shack a high-end restaurant by utilizing fancy restaurant gadgets and Robby Ray learns to text and sends several to Jackson.
82	27	"Got to Get Her Out of My House"	Rich Correll	Douglas Lieblein	January 10, 2010	321	3.9
Lilly and Oliver want to buy a car, so they have to get a job. Miley feels guilty for accidentally getting Lilly fired from her job. When Miley convinces Lilly to become their housekeeper, her cleaning techniques drive the Stewarts up the wall, so Miley and Jackson devise a plan to get Lilly's old job back. Meanwhile, Oliver gets a job at Rico's and Rico tries to get him mad enough to quit.
83	28	"The Wheel Near My Bed (Keeps on Turnin')"	Bob Koherr	Jay J. Demopoulos & Steven James Meyer	February 21, 2010	328	4.5
Lilly is invited to stay at the Stewarts' house when her mom gets a job in Atlanta. Miley is at first happy that Lilly will be staying, as she sings "Roomies" to a conga dance with her, but gets annoyed quite quickly. This is due to many things. One is that Lilly is a restless sleeper, and another is that she talks on the phone with Oliver during the night when Miley is trying to sleep. The last thing is that her hamster runs on a squeaky wheel, slurps up water, urinates, then repeats this process during the course of the night. The next morning, Miley tells her dad that she does not like the sleeping arrangements while Lilly is supposedly at the beach, but Lilly hears this, as she came back to get her sunscreen. Sadly, Lilly moves to her dad's apartment, which is small and has only one room. Miley visits her, and tells her that she only said that because she was cranky, and the girls make up.
84	29	"Miley Says Goodbye? Part 1"	Rich Correll	Michael Poryes & Steven Peterman	March 7, 2010	329	7.0
The episode begins with Miley having a dream where she is back in Tennessee with Uncle Earl and her horse, Blue Jeans. Miley wants Blue Jeans back in Malibu after her dream of Blue Jeans talking to her. But soon after Blue Jeans comes, he runs away but comes back later. From her feelings of her old horse, Miley decides whether to stay living in Malibu or go back to Tennessee. Also, Jackson gets a "nice" apartment that eventually turns out to be bad and Rico actually owns the whole block where Jackson lives.
85	30	"Miley Says Goodbye? Part 2"	Rich Correll	Michael Poryes & Steven Peterman	March 14, 2010 (Note: This part was available first on the Miley Says Goodbye? DVD that was released on March 9, 2010. The DVD includes the hour-long special, "He Could Be the One" with an alternate ending. The whole episode premiered in Greece on ERT (ET1) on December 21, 2009.)	330	7.6
Jackson is still having trouble adjusting in his crumbling wreck of an apartment. Miley tells Lilly she is moving to Tennessee and Oliver tells her he is going on tour with the band above Jackson's apartment. Miley talks to Jackson about how she should solve her problem, he tells her to take a ride with Blue Jeans, her dad comes and she tells him that she does not want to move, he tells her he bought a ranch in Malibu for them to move to. Miley's dad tells Jackson that they canceled his lease so he could live with them. In the end Miley, her dad, Lilly, Oliver, and Jackson leave the house. The episode ends with Miley looking back at her empty house but walks away while smiling to see her new home.
