= Shannon Flynn (director) =

American television director

- Education: Yale School of Drama
- Occupation: Television director
- Years active: 2005–present

Shannon Flynn is an American television director. She is best known for her directorial work on teen sitcoms for Nickelodeon and Disney Channel, such as Hannah Montana, Sonny with a Chance, Good Luck Charlie, How to Rock, Austin & Ally, Jessie, The Haunted Hathaways, Liv and Maddie, Instant Mom, The Thundermans, Nicky, Ricky, Dicky & Dawn, Bella and the Bulldogs, Best Friends Whenever, Bunk'd, Raven's Home, and Coop and Cami Ask the World. She has recently shifted to directing episodes of television shows aimed at preschoolers, such as Sesame Street and Yo Gabba GabbaLand!.

She is an alumna of the Yale School of Drama, her thesis was a staged adaptation of Franz Kafka’s The Trial.
