= I'll Always Remember You =

- Hannah Montana episode
- Miley realizes that Lilly and Jesse hate what the secret has done to their lives.
- Episode no.: Season 4 Episode 9
- Directed by: Bob Koherr (part 1); Shannon Flynn (part 2)
- Written by: Maria Brown-Gallenberg; Andrew Green
- Cinematography by: Alan Keath Walker
- Editing by: Kenny Tintorri
- Production code: 409-410
- Original air date: November 7, 2010 (Note: This episode was first released in Who is Hannah Montana? DVD on November 2, 2010.)
- Running time: 1 hour (with commercials)

Guest appearances
- Jay Leno as himself; Valerie Mahaffey as Ms. Jameson; Phil McGraw as himself; Drew Roy as Jesse; Tammin Sursok as Siena

Episode chronology
← Previous "Hannah's Gonna Get This"	Next → "Can You See The Real Me?"
- Hannah Montana season 4

"I'll Always Remember You" is the ninth episode of the fourth season, and 94th overall episode, of the Disney Channel sitcom series Hannah Montana. It was written by Andrew Green and Maria Brown-Gallenberg. It originally aired on November 7, 2010. The episode title is a reference to the Hannah Montana song "I'll Always Remember You". The one-hour episode is notable for being the first time Miley Stewart admits her secret to the world that she is Hannah Montana.

The episode features three original songs: "Barefoot Cinderella", "I'll Always Remember You", and "Wherever I Go." This episode is also notable for being the last time that Hannah Montana and Lola Luftnagle are featured in an episode, with Miley Stewart becoming the main focus of the show for the remaining episodes.

== Plot ==
Miley's boyfriend, Jesse, comes to see Miley, and reveals that he knows Miley's secret, that she is the pop star Hannah Montana. After telling him that he can be her guitarist again, she tries to convince him to not show any affection while she is Hannah Montana, for fear that it is revealed he is cheating on one of them.

While performing on The Tonight Show with Jay Leno, Jesse kisses Hannah, and Leno calls them America's new sweethearts. After Jesse gets recognized at the pier, he hugs Miley, and this picture is spread across the news, including Leno's show, where he announces Jesse cheated on Hannah. Via text messages from his family, Jesse learns that Hannah fans are growing upset with him, and says to Miley, that as long as there are two of her, he cannot be with her, so they separate.

Miley and Lilly's college acceptance letters come in the mail, and Miley finds out she did not get accepted to Stanford University, when Lilly did. Miley drives the 200 miles to Stanford, to find out that though she has the right character and grades, she did not have as many extracurricular activities as Lilly. She becomes more upset when she realizes that she has done plenty of things, but cannot tell because of the Hannah secret.

After driving back home, Lilly has the idea to tell the admissions woman that Miley was Hannah's assistant, and that she did do all those things. On the drive there, Dr. Phil appears as a visual manifestation of her overstressed subconscious. Upon arrival, Miley finds out that she needs some sort of proof of employment, and drives back home once more to change into Hannah Montana. When arriving as Hannah, she finds out that a celebrity like herself would be admitted, if she had Miley's grades. After a short consideration to take off the wig, she returns home disappointed.

Lilly then opts to stay out of college for a year, until Miley gets in. Jesse then comes over, reconciling with Miley. While in her bedroom, Miley talks to her conscience, which appears as Hannah, about how much her friends and family have had to compromise for her secret. Then again in the house, she sees Jesse and Lilly telling her that they have had to compromise their lives for her.

After a talk with her father, Miley looks back at all her Hannah outfits and remembers the great times she has had as Hannah from the beginning of the show. She has made up her mind; she sits down to talk with "Hannah" again, who bids her one final farewell as Miley thanks her, before finally leaving Hannah behind.

She appears on The Tonight Show with Jay Leno again, with something to say. She goes on to say that the eleven-year girl wanting to be a rock star, and to have a normal life, no longer wants to pretend anymore, and takes off her Hannah wig and sings a song as Miley. In a show of support, Robby takes off his manager moustache, and Lilly takes off her Lola wig, and together they say good-bye to their alter egos as well.

=== Narration ===
This is the second episode where there is background commentary along with the storyline, the first being "He Could Be the One". Jason Earles, Moises Arias, and Tammin Sursok narrate the story as Jackson, Rico, and Siena (but do not appear in the actual episode, instead directly addressing the audience) in eight performances.

- The episode is introduced with the three as singing mice, each with their traditional character's respective initial on their sweaters, singing to the tune of "Camptown Races", in an Alvin and the Chipmunks parody, on the kitchen counter.
- After Hannah kisses Jesse on The Tonight Show with Jay Leno, the three perform an electronic song at the pier as silver living statues.
- After Miley gets rejected from Stanford, the trio performs a show tune parody.
- On Miley's drive back to Stanford, the three sing an old-time song as hillbillies on the car radio.
- After Hannah gets rejected from Stanford, they perform another show tune, this time as cats.
- After Jesse takes Miley back, the trio appear on a bag of horse feed, where they sing to the tune of the William Tell Overture as cowboys on a wagon.
- After Miley realizes what the secret is doing, the three parody Lady Gaga's song "Poker Face" dressed as jesters.
- At the end of the episode, the three sing a lullaby to the tune of "Twinkle Twinkle Little Star" as babies, listing all of the people who knew Miley's secret prior to her telling the world: Lilly, Oliver, Jesse, Jake, Siena, and the town of Crowley Corners.

== Cast ==
=== Main ===
- Miley Cyrus as Miley Stewart / Hannah Montana
- Emily Osment as Lilly Truscott / Lola Luftnagle
- Jason Earles as Jackson Stewart
- Moisés Arias as Rico Suave
- Billy Ray Cyrus as Robby Ray Stewart

=== Guest stars ===
- Valerie Mahaffey as Ms. Jameson
- Tammin Sursok as Siena
- Drew Roy as Jesse

=== Co-starring ===
- Charlene Deguzman as Drummer
- Alvin C. Forbes as Keyboardist
- Max Atom Kuehn as Bass Player
- Geoffrey Giro Plitt as Lenny
- Nathaniel John Smith as Buster
- Zoe Page as Hannah Montana look-alike

== Production ==
This episode was primarily taped at Sunset Bronson Studios. The Tonight Show with Jay Leno portions were taped at NBC's Burbank Studios.

== Reception ==
The episode "became the series' most-watched telecast in more than three years among Total Viewers", with 7.1 million viewers. Being the most watched episode of the fourth season, the episode also generated "the largest Total View, Kid 6-11 and Tween 9-14" audiences in an hour in Disney Channel's history.

== Music ==
In addition to the above mentioned narration songs, Miley Cyrus performs three songs in character:

- "Barefoot Cinderella" on the first The Tonight Show with Jay Leno appearance.
- "I'll Always Remember You" during a montage of Miley remembering her life as Hannah.
- "Wherever I Go" on the second The Tonight Show with Jay Leno appearance, after pulling off the wig.
