= Me and Mr. Jonas and Mr. Jonas and Mr. Jonas =

- Hannah Montana episode
- Episode no.: Season 2 Episode 16
- Directed by: Mark Cendrowski
- Written by: Douglas Lieblein
- Production code: 217
- Original air date: August 17, 2007
- Running time: 22 minutes

Guest appearances
- Jonas Brothers; Debra D. Holt

Episode chronology
← Previous "Song Sung Bad"	Next → "Don't Stop 'Til You Get the Phone"
- Hannah Montana season 2

"Me and Mr. Jonas and Mr. Jonas and Mr. Jonas" is the 42nd episode of the Disney Channel series Hannah Montana, and features the Jonas Brothers as special guest stars. The episode was first aired after the premiere of the Disney Channel Original Movie High School Musical 2 and a sneak peek of the new series Phineas and Ferb. The episode broke basic cable records with 10.8 million viewers and became basic cable's most watched series telecast ever. It is also the highest-rated episode of Hannah Montana ever.

The episode also marked the Jonas Brothers' debut on Disney Channel. They have since starred in the films Camp Rock and Camp Rock 2: The Final Jam and the series Jonas, among other programs. The episode also led to the Jonas Brothers touring with Miley Cyrus on the Best of Both Worlds Tour from October 2007 to January 2008.

== Plot ==
Hannah Montana impatiently waits at the recording studios to start work with her father Robby Stewart. She finally barges in on an occupied studio room and is surprised to find the Jonas Brothers at work. Hannah and The Band meet each other, both mutually starstruck. But when Robby introduces himself, the Jonas Brothers instantly recognize him as "Robbie Ray," Hannah's song-writing father. The boys soon appear to be more interested in speaking with Robby than with Hannah.

Over the next several days, Robby develops a friendship with the Jonas Brothers and even writes a song for them. ("We Got the Party") Miley becomes jealous and suspects that Robby will enjoy writing for them more than he does writing for Hannah. She and Lilly devise a plan to make the Jonas Brothers lose respect for Robby as a songwriter.

Miley and Lilly dress up as male rockers "Milo" and "Otis," go back to the recording studios, and play their own version of "We Got the Party" in front of the Jonas Brothers. When the brothers claim that Robbie Ray wrote the song for them, Milo (Miley) tells them that he and Otis (Lily) in fact wrote the song and that Robbie Ray stole it from them. The Jonas Brothers apologize and let Milo and Otis have the song, but just then Robby arrives. Miley and Lilly quickly hide and Robby straightens things out with the Jonas Brothers.

Miley later calls the Jonas Brothers (as Hannah) and tells them that she hired Milo and Otis as a prank. Robby assures Miley that he still loves writing songs for Hannah, and that he had a vision about having her collaborate with the Jonas Brothers on a future recording. Later at an evening beach concert, Hannah and the Jonas Brothers perform "We Got the Party" together.

Later Robby and Miley stalk through the recording studios with marshmallow guns looking for the Jonas Brothers. Assuming they are in the studio room, they again barge in, only to find a gospel choir in the middle of recording "When the Saints Go Marching In." As Robby and Miley sheepishly leave the room, they come out and wondered why they weren't there, because they promised they would be. Then, Joe emerges from around the corner and says, "And we always keep our promises!" The other brothers emerge and Miley says, "Duck and cover daddy, it's Return of the Jonai!" before they start their marshmallow war.

Meanwhile Jackson attempts to break the world record of hopping on a pogo stick for 20 hours and 42 minutes. A sporting goods company offers a $5,000 reward to anyone to break the record on their new pogo stick, the Nackamora Extreme. Jackson is forced to share half of his potential earnings with Rico after needing help getting into the bathroom while on the pogo stick. Rico also times Jackson on a stop watch, but fails to tell him when he breaks the record because he wants to see how long he can go. When Jackson finally collapses from exhaustion, he thinks he has failed just minutes short of breaking the record. He is furious with Rico after learning that he hopped four hours beyond the record. He tries to catch Rico, but his legs are too tired out.
