= Michael Poryes =

American television producer

Michael David Poryes (born March 22, 1955) is an American television producer, screenwriter and filmmaker, best known for co-creating the Disney Channel shows That's So Raven and Hannah Montana.

== Filmography ==
=== Executive producer ===
- Hannah Montana: The Movie (2009)
- Wesley Knarr (2009)
- That's So Raven (2003–2007)
- Hannah Montana (2006–2011)
- Life with Boys (2011–2013)

He also worked as a writer in Saved by the Bell.

== Creator ==
- That's So Raven (2003–2007)
- Hannah Montana (2006–2011)
- Life with Boys (2011–2013)
- Palak Pe Jhalak (2015)
- Raven's Home (2017–2023)
- Home Sweet Rome (2023)
