= Steven Peterman =

American television producer, screenwriter, and actor

- Education: Harvard College
- Occupations: TV producer; screenwriter; actor
- Years active: 1979–present

Steven Peterman is an American television producer, screenwriter, and actor. His credits include Benson, Square Pegs, Family Ties, Murphy Brown, Suddenly Susan, Becker, the second season of W.I.T.C.H. and Hannah Montana.

He is an Emmy winner in the category of Primetime Emmy Award for Outstanding Writing for a Comedy Series for the Murphy Brown episode "Jingle Hell, Jingle Hell, Jingle All the Way".

== Filmography ==
Year	Title	Role	Notes
1980	Where the Buffalo Roam	Student in Court	
1981	All Night Long	Leon	
1982	Tag: The Assassination Game	Schooster	
1985	Raw Tunes		
