= Hannah Montana =

American teen sitcom (2006–2011)

- Also known as: Hannah Montana Forever (season 4)
- Genre: Teen sitcom
- Created by: Michael Poryes; Rich Correll; Barry O'Brien
- Starring: Miley Cyrus; Emily Osment; Mitchel Musso; Jason Earles; Billy Ray Cyrus; Moisés Arias
- Opening theme: "The Best of Both Worlds" by Miley Cyrus
- Country of origin: United States
- No. of seasons: 4
- No. of episodes: 98 (list of episodes)

Production
- Executive producers: Steven Peterman; Michael Poryes
- Running time: 22 minutes
- Production companies: It's a Laugh Productions; Michael Poryes Productions

Original release
- Network: Disney Channel
- Release: March 24, 2006 – January 16, 2011

Hannah Montana (Note: Titled Hannah Montana Forever for the fourth and final season.) is an American teen sitcom created by Michael Poryes, Rich Correll, and Barry O'Brien that aired on Disney Channel for four seasons between March 2006 and January 2011. The series centers on Miley Stewart (played by Miley Cyrus), a teenage girl living a double life as famous pop singer Hannah Montana, an alter ego she adopted so she could maintain her anonymity and live a normal life as a typical teenager. Episodes deal with Miley's everyday struggles to cope with the social and personal issues of adolescence while maintaining the added complexities of her secret identity, which she sustains by wearing a blonde wig. Miley has strong relationships with her brother Jackson (Jason Earles) and father Robby Ray (Billy Ray Cyrus), as well as her best friends Lilly Truscott (Emily Osment) and Oliver Oken (Mitchel Musso), who become aware of her secret. Overarching themes include a focus on family and friendships as well as the importance of music and discovering one's identity.

The Walt Disney Company commissioned the series after the success of Disney Channel's previous music-based franchises, such as the made-for-television film High School Musical (2006). Hannah Montana was produced by It's a Laugh Productions in association with Poryes's production company, and premiered on Disney Channel on March 24, 2006. A concert film, Hannah Montana & Miley Cyrus: Best of Both Worlds Concert, in which Miley Cyrus performs as Hannah Montana and herself, was released in 2008. The following year, the feature film Hannah Montana: The Movie was released. The series concluded on January 16, 2011, as a result of Cyrus's growing popularity and music career, and her desire to move into more mature acting roles. Cyrus executive-produced and appeared in the Hannah Montana 20th Anniversary Special, which was released on Disney+ on March 24, 2026 to commemorate the 20th anniversary of the series.

Hannah Montana is one of Disney Channel's most commercially successful franchises. It received consistently high viewership in the United States on cable television and influenced the development of merchandise, soundtrack albums, and concert tours. However, television critics disliked the writing and depiction of gender roles and stereotypes. Hannah Montana helped launch Cyrus's musical career and established her as a teen idol. After Cyrus began developing an increasingly provocative public image, commentators criticized Hannah Montana as having a negative influence on its audience. The series was nominated for four Primetime Emmy Awards for Outstanding Children's Program between 2007 and 2010; Cyrus won a Young Artist Award for Best Performance in a TV Series, Leading Young Actress in 2008.

== Premise ==
=== Story and characters ===
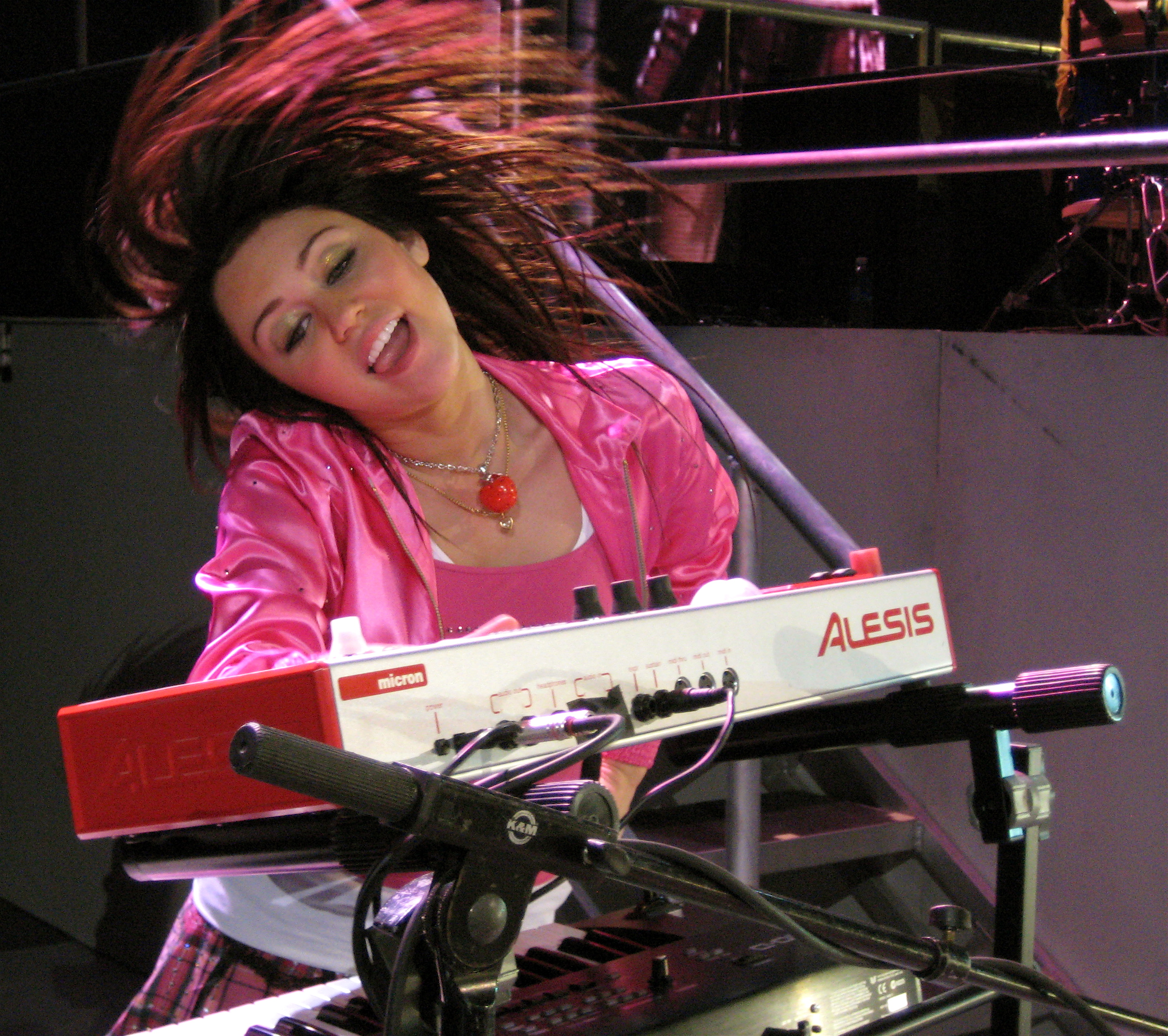
Miley Cyrus, pictured in 2008, serves as the program's central focus during its four-season run.

Miley Stewart is a 14-year-old middle school student who appears to live a normal life but has a secret identity, pop singer Hannah Montana, an alias she chose so she could have a private life away from the public spotlight. To conceal her true identity, she wears a blonde wig when she appears as Hannah. Miley's father, Robby Ray Stewart, was a famous country music singer (Note: Robby Ray Stewart is known to the public under the stage name of "Robbie Ray". The spelling of this is shown on a prop of his album "Robbie Ray Live" in the episode "For (Give) a Little Bit".) before retiring after his wife's death to focus on raising Miley and her older brother Jackson. At the start of the series, the family have moved from Tennessee to Malibu, California, to allow Miley to develop her musical career; Robby Ray works as her manager. As her schoolmates idolize Hannah Montana, Miley is often tempted to reveal her secret and assume a celebrity status at school. In the pilot episode, Miley's best friend Lilly Truscott uncovers the truth about her alter ego and adopts the alias Lola Luftnagle to help protect Miley's secret. Miley later reveals her secret to close friend Oliver Oken, leaving him and Lilly as the only schoolmates she has trusted with the secret; he adopts the alias Mike Stanley III. Jackson works for Rico Suave at a local beach food stand; he and Rico often feature in the show's subplots. Miley and her friends begin attending high school at the start of the second season, and in the following season, Lilly and Oliver develop a romantic relationship.

In the third season finale, Miley relocates her horse Blue Jeans to California after she feels homesick for Tennessee. The horse is uncomfortable after being moved, and Miley contemplates permanently returning to her hometown. The Stewart family compromise and move out of their house in Malibu to a nearby ranch. In the final season, Miley is faced with extra difficulties in maintaining her double life, which affect her capacity to attend college with Lilly. Faced with the choice between continuing being Hannah Montana and divulging her secret, she ultimately reveals her true identity to the world and has to deal with the effects of this decision before leaving for college. She merges her celebrity persona with her former private identity, and Miley Stewart enters adulthood with a newfound celebrity status.

=== Themes ===
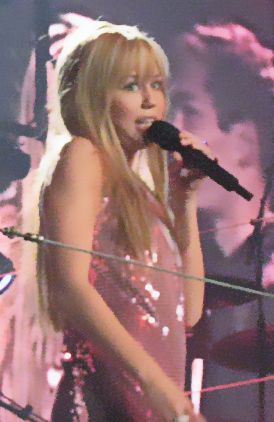
Miley Cyrus performing as Hannah Montana; the persona is identifiable by her blonde wig.

The central conflict of the series is the disconnect between the public and private lives of Miley Stewart, and the lengths to which she must go to secure her life as a normal teenager and protect her relationships with her friends. She values her core identity as "just Miley" and endeavors to protect her sense of self. This is made evident in the pilot when she fears her friends might not treat her the same way if they become aware of her celebrity status; Miley's friendships and social opportunities at school are important to her. Jacques Steinberg of The New York Times said the series suggests celebrity status should not be confused with real life and that happiness comes as a result of staying true to one's self. In the Celebrity Studies journal, Melanie Kennedy states Miley must learn to remain as her "authentic self" while still being a celebrity; Tyler Bickford of Women's Studies Quarterly observes that lyrics in the theme song "celebrate authenticity" while also accentuating the benefits of a celebrity lifestyle. Morgan Genevieve Blue of Feminist Media Studies distinguished Hannah Montana from other programs about secret identities because of the public nature of Miley's alter ego.

Series creator Michael Poryes said his goal was not to focus on the gimmick but to write about characters and relationships, exploring the real issues Miley faces and how they would be affected by her celebrity lifestyle. While Miley discloses her secret to her close friends, she largely continues to hide her identity because the loss of the anonymity would, to her, represent a loss of her youth. When she reveals her true identity to the world, it is a symbolic representation of the end of her childhood. The final episodes reflect Miley's struggle to say goodbye to her alter ego.

According to Kennedy, Hannah Montana parallels the idea of "becoming a celebrity" with "growing up female" and teaches young women the perceived importance of investing in celebrity culture. This intensifies and normalizes the desire of young people to become famous. Bickford said the series discusses themes of publicness and consumerism. Friendship is an important theme of the series, which is evident between Miley and her best friend Lilly. When Miley tells Lilly about her hidden persona in the pilot episode, Lilly promises not to divulge the secret to anyone. Bickford described these relationships as the "emotionally fraught", "intensely valued" core of the series, reflecting the way best-friendship is an important element of childhood.

== Production ==
=== Development ===
In the early 2000s, The Walt Disney Company found success with its pay television network Disney Channel, which had a pattern of original programming for a preadolescent audience that featured music. The girl group The Cheetah Girls was made popular by the eponymous television film and found commercial success outside the movie, and Hilary Duff's music was used to cross-promote the series Lizzie McGuire. Disney sponsored concerts featuring music from the network and used their talent to build on the brands; Gary Marsh, the president of Disney Channels Worldwide, cited Lizzie McGuire as its "first success". The network believed the new series Hannah Montana could be marketed in a similar manner. Disney Channel had also found success with musical episodes of its earlier comedy series Even Stevens and That's So Raven. Hollywood.com said the show could build on the success of Disney's television film High School Musical (2006), which also includes music. The sitcom premiered two months after High School Musical. The concept of Hannah Montana was originally labeled "cast contingent", meaning the series would not progress until the central roles were appropriately cast. The project was publicly announced in 2004; casting advertisements for the filming of a pilot were published in January 2005.

Disney Channel officially greenlit Hannah Montana as a new, half-hour sitcom in August 2005. Twenty episodes were initially ordered for the first season and six extra episodes were later added to the commission. (Note: Cyrus stated thirteen episodes were initially picked up.) The series was developed by Michael Poryes, who had previously co-created and produced That's So Raven for Disney Channel. Poryes created Hannah Montana with director Rich Correll and writer Barry O'Brien, while Steven Peterman joined Poryes as an executive producer. Disney selected the pilot for Hannah Montana to progress to a series against a potential spin-off of Lizzie McGuire, which the network also considered during the 2004–05 pilot season. The full main cast were attached to the project in August and filming for the remainder of the first season was scheduled to begin in November 2005. It's a Laugh Productions produced the program in association with the network. Former president of Disney Channels Worldwide Rich Ross stated the concept of the series conforms to the typical Disney Channel formula; "an ordinary person in an extraordinary situation". The series is primarily aimed at a preadolescent female audience, (Note: Bickford defines preadolescent, or "tween", as those aged nine to thirteen.) however, its framework as a family sitcom allows it to have a wider appeal.

=== Casting ===
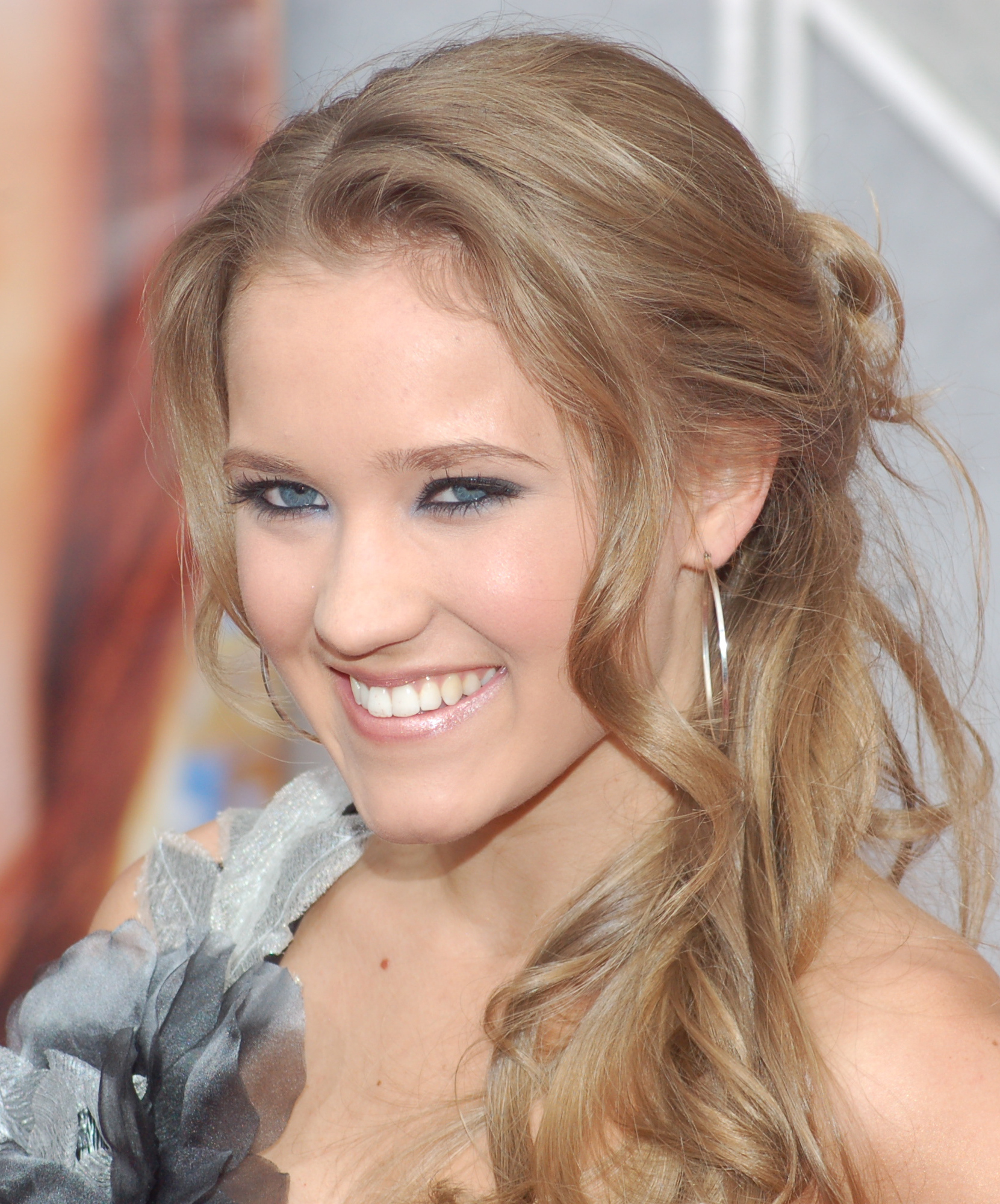
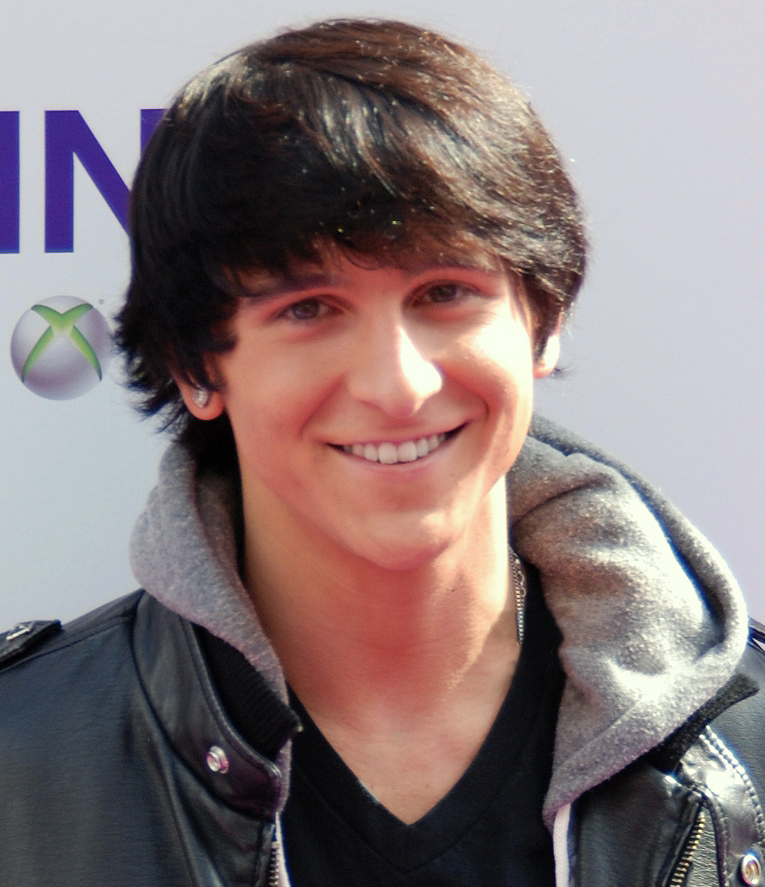
Emily Osment (left, 2009) and Mitchel Musso (right, 2010) portrayed Stewart's best friends, Lilly Truscott and Oliver Oken, throughout the series.

The program and its primary cast were announced in August 2005; Miley Cyrus would be portraying the central character of Miley Stewart. After receiving the script from her agents, Miley Cyrus, aged eleven at the time, auditioned against over 1,000 applicants for the lead role, originally named Chloe Stewart. She was rejected for being too young to play the character; Marsh cited her lack of professional experience. (Note: Cyrus originally auditioned for the best friend role of Lilly before producers asked her to audition for the central role. Chloe Stewart was originally planned to be fifteen, and Cyrus was aged between eleven and twelve.) Cyrus persistently sent the producers more audition tapes. After six months of further casting searches, Marsh asked Cyrus, aged twelve, to audition again, and she received the role. Poryes later stated Marsh was responsible for selecting Cyrus over other "safe" choices who were more in-line with the producers' original vision. (Note: The two other final candidates for the lead role were Daniella Monet and Taylor Momsen. Previously, Aly Michalka had been offered the lead role by Marsh, and AJ Michalka was considered to play Lilly, but the pop duo turned down the offers.) After Cyrus was cast, the character's name was changed to Miley Stewart in an attempt to limit confusion about the show's characters and premise. (Note: Cyrus stated the character's name was changed after the writers said she "embodied" the character.) Network executives cited her confidence, comic timing, and "husky" singing voice as reasons for her casting on the series. In 2006, Time commented that Disney typically selected actors who had the potential to become popular celebrity figures and that Cyrus would likely experience the same process.

Cyrus's father, Billy Ray Cyrus, joined the cast as Miley's father Robby Ray Stewart; he was only asked to audition after his daughter had received the role. Peterman praised the pair's "natural chemistry". Billy Ray Cyrus was initially apprehensive about being cast in the series—he did not want to "screw up Miley's show" and suggested a "real actor" be cast instead—but later accepted the role.

The series also stars Emily Osment as Lilly Truscott, Mitchel Musso as Oliver Oken, and Jason Earles as Miley's older brother Jackson Stewart. (Note: Earles was aged 28 when the program first aired in 2006, while portraying a teenager.) Moisés Arias appears as Rico Suave in a supporting role throughout the first season; he was promoted to the main cast for the show's second season. The network dropped Musso's character Oliver to a recurring role in the fourth season because he had been cast in Pair of Kings, which was developed for the sister channel Disney XD.

Guest stars including Vicki Lawrence, Jesse McCartney, and the Jonas Brothers appear throughout the series. Brooke Shields portrays Miley's deceased mother in dream sequences, through which she typically offers advice. Singer Dolly Parton, Cyrus's real life godmother, had a recurring role as Miley's godmother, Aunt Dolly. Parton stated Cyrus persuaded executives to write her into the series and credited her role for gaining her a following among young people. The final season includes guest roles from musicians Sheryl Crow and Iyaz; actors Christine Taylor, Ray Liotta, and Angus T. Jones; and television personalities Phil McGraw, Jay Leno, and Kelly Ripa.

=== Music ===
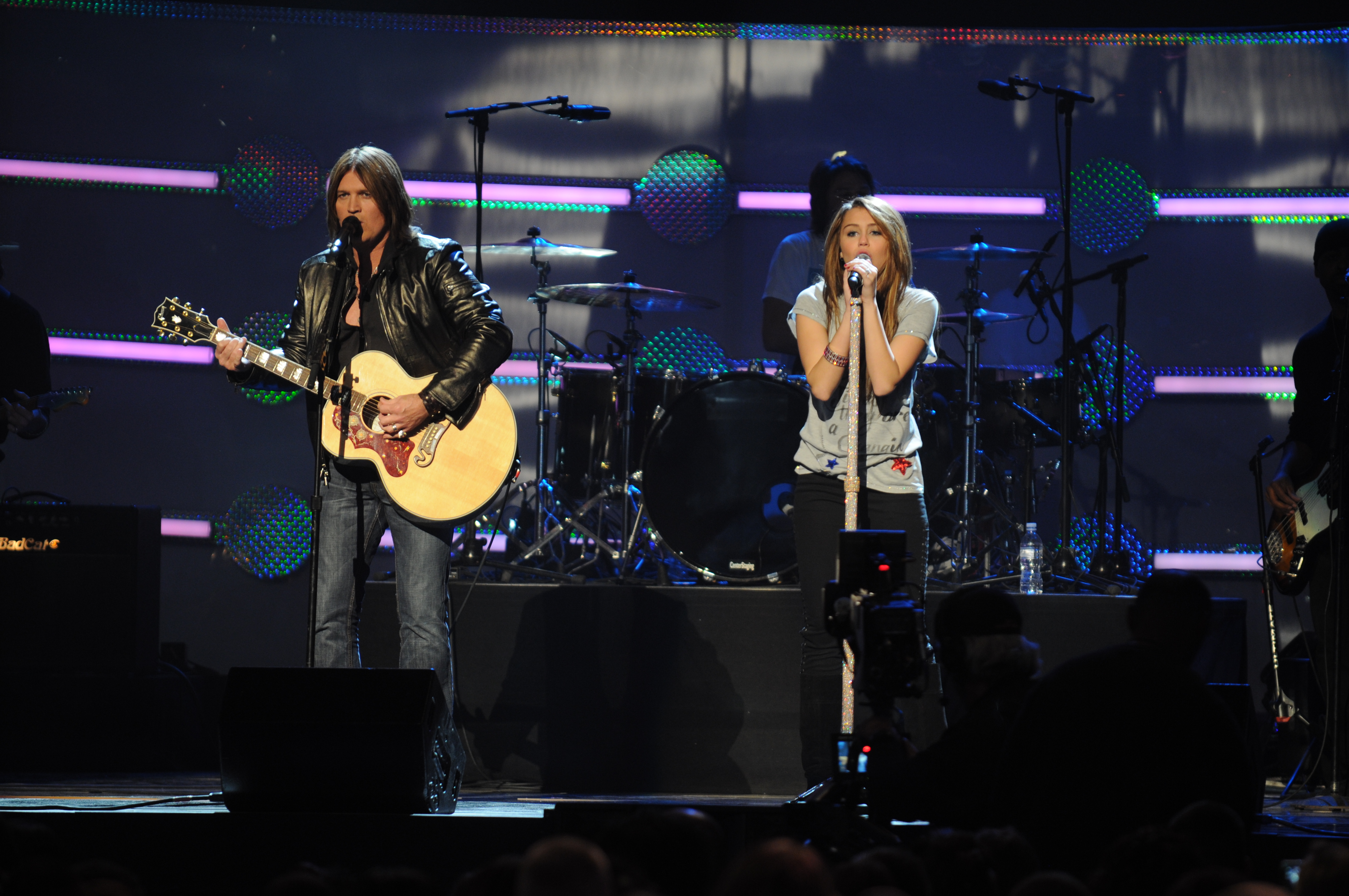
Miley Cyrus and Billy Ray Cyrus performing "Ready, Set, Don't Go" at a 2009 concert

Hannah Montana includes original music; Disney released albums of songs from the series. Miley Cyrus performs as Hannah Montana and sings the show's theme song, "The Best of Both Worlds". By April 2006, a soundtrack was scheduled for release in the latter half of the year; this would be followed by a studio album by Cyrus the following year. The soundtrack album Hannah Montana was released in October 2006; many of the songs' lyrics allude to the show's premise and Miley Stewart's secret identity. Songwriter Matthew Gerrard intended to encompass the show's premise in the lyrics of the songs. Jeannie Lurie, another key songwriter, explained that it was important for their team to capture the character's voice and feelings within each song's lyrics. The soundtrack albums Hannah Montana 2: Meet Miley Cyrus (2007), Hannah Montana 3 (2009), and Hannah Montana Forever (2010) were released to coincide with their respective seasons. The lyrical themes later became more mature, and reflected storylines from the series such as romantic relationships.

The show's music includes elements of teen pop, pop rock, and country pop genres. Steve Vincent, an executive of Disney Channel music, had previously worked on The Cheetah Girls and High School Musical, and helped to develop the sound of the projects. Vincent drew inspiration from country pop artists Shania Twain and Carrie Underwood, as well as pop artists such as Kelly Clarkson, to establish Hannah Montana's musical style. The music makes prominent use of acoustic guitars, synthesizers, and backing vocals. "Ready, Set, Don't Go", a song Billy Ray Cyrus wrote when Miley was cast, was used in the program. Guest stars, such as singer-songwriter David Archuleta, also contributed to songs for the series.

=== Filming ===
Hannah Montana was recorded in front of a live studio audience at Sunset Bronson Studios on Thursdays and Fridays. Cyrus was required to attend school on set, while Osment attended an external prep school. While filming the pilot, Cyrus performed a concert as Hannah Montana at Glendale Centre Theatre to acquire footage for the show.

Production of the second season began in Los Angeles, California, in November 2006, and concluded in September 2007. In April 2008, the program was renewed for a third season, which had commenced production by August. By this time, Disney had optioned the program for a fourth season. That December, the network ordered another six episodes, extending the third season to 30 episodes. Filming for the third season concluded in mid-2009.

The series also filmed episodes which aired as part of network crossover specials. The first special, That's So Suite Life of Hannah Montana, aired on July 28, 2006, as a crossover featuring That's So Raven and The Suite Life of Zack & Cody. The second special, Wizards on Deck with Hannah Montana, aired on July 17, 2009, and contained episodes of Wizards of Waverly Place and The Suite Life on Deck.

=== Conclusion and impact on Cyrus ===
Hannah Montana was renewed for a fourth season on June 1, 2009. The new set of episodes has a new setting; the Stewart family move out of their Malibu home to a nearby ranch. Billy Ray Cyrus stated this would be the final season and that Miley Cyrus hoped there would be a conclusion to the show's story. Production for the season began in January 2010, when Disney confirmed the program would be officially concluding. The series finale was scheduled to air in early 2011. As the final season was filmed, Cyrus said she wanted to move on from the series, stating, "I can't base my career off of the six-year-olds". She became increasingly uncomfortable wearing the extravagant, colorful costumes associated with Hannah and stated she had "grown out of it". The final season premiered on July 11, 2010. Cyrus later said she felt she had matured beyond working on the series and dressing up as Hannah Montana.

== Episodes ==
Season	Episodes	Originally released	
Season	Episodes	First released	Last released
1	26	March 24, 2006	March 30, 2007
2	29	April 23, 2007	October 12, 2008
3	30	November 2, 2008	March 14, 2010
4	13	July 11, 2010	January 16, 2011

== Reception ==
=== Critical reception ===
Bickford said Hannah Montana helped Disney return to a level of commercial success that had been absent since its musical films of the 1990s, and built on the success of the network's programs Lizzie McGuire and That's So Raven. He explained that Hannah Montana adopted a business model of combining celebrity acts with film, television, and popular music for a pre-adolescent audience and compared this model to 1990s teen pop artists such as Britney Spears and NSYNC, who were also marketed to children. Heather Phares of AllMusic described the melodies of the featured songs as strong and Cyrus's vocals as charismatic. Ruthann Mayes-Elma said in a journal article Hannah Montana is a wholesome, "bubble-gum" television show, and that the use of Miley's catchphrase "sweet nibblets" in the place of profanity in the scripts helped solidify the show's family-friendly appeal. The A.V. Club's Marah Eakin found fault with the writing of Hannah Montana, criticizing its "oppressive" laugh track, and its use of stereotypes.

The series has been examined for its depiction of gender roles and stereotypes. Blue said the series establishes stereotypical femininity as part of girlhood. She explained that the primary female characters, Miley and her alter ego—Hannah, are positioned as post-feminist subjects in a way their representation is confined to notions of celebrity and consumerism. Bickford interpreted the theme song "The Best of Both Worlds" as an expression of Miley's choice between her contradictory identities, saying the choice is "as simple as choosing a pair of shoes" and that the character is privileged because she has multiple shoes and identities. Blue noted the contradiction of Miley's "normal life" being directly influenced by her celebrity status in ways such as financial security and a spacious home; she suggested Miley supports the family financially. Mayes-Elma criticized the portrayal of Miley as an "airhead" rather than as a "strong, agentic girl", and Blue said Lilly is depicted as a tomboy who does not uphold the femininity Miley represents.

In the book The Queer Fantasies of the American Family Sitcom, Tison Pugh analyzed the subtle sexualization present within the characters of Hannah Montana, such as Jackson's girlfriend Siena, who works as a bikini model. In a journal article, Shirley Steinberg cites Miley as a character who maintains chastity but wears objectifying clothing. Mayes-Elma said guest stars such as the Jonas Brothers were incorporated by Disney to encourage the viewership of young teenage girls. Pugh stated that the program obscures the divergence between fiction and reality, due to the character of Miley Stewart sharing similarities to Miley Cyrus, Robby Ray Stewart being difficult to distinguish from Billy Ray Cyrus, and guest actors such as Parton and the Jonas Brothers playing fictional versions of themselves. Kennedy added that featuring celebrity guests, such as Leno and his real talk-show The Tonight Show with Jay Leno, contributed to Miley being placed in the "real world" and thus becoming easily confusable with Cyrus. Pugh explained that displaying Miley as an authentic and likable character was a key marketing strategy, which led to Cyrus becoming closely associated with the Hannah Montana branding; Mayes-Elma explicated that Disney was selling Cyrus—a then-sixteen-year-old girl—to consumers as a "form of pop cultural prostitution". Blue also took note of the intersection between the world of the fictional characters and that of Cyrus.

=== U.S. television ratings ===
The series premiere of Hannah Montana was aired on March 24, 2006, as a lead-in to a rerun of High School Musical, and received 5.4 million viewers. This was the highest-rating premiere episode in the history of Disney Channel as of 2006. By April 2006, Hannah Montana had an average of more than 3.5 million viewers for each episode, many whom were aged between six and fourteen. The show's most-viewed episode, "Me and Mr. Jonas and Mr. Jonas and Mr. Jonas", was aired on August 17, 2007, as a lead-out to the premiere of High School Musical 2 and was viewed by 10.7 million people. In 2026, the series was reported to have been streamed on Disney+ for a total of 500 million hours; viewership increased by 1,000% compared to the previous week following the release of the 20th anniversary special.

Viewership and ratings per season of Hannah Montana
Season	Episodes	First aired		Last aired		Avg. viewers (millions)
Season	Episodes	Date	Viewers (millions)	Date	Viewers (millions)	Avg. viewers (millions)
1	26	March 24, 2006	5.4	March 30, 2007	3.1	4.3
2	29	April 23, 2007	3.5	October 12, 2008	4.4	4.69
3	30	November 2, 2008	5.5	March 14, 2010	7.6	4.86
4	13	July 11, 2010	5.7	January 16, 2011	6.2	5.05

=== Awards and nominations ===
List of awards and nominations received by Hannah Montana
Award	Year	Recipient(s) and nominee(s)	Category	Result	Ref.
Artios Awards	2006	Carol Goldwasser and Howard Meltzer	Outstanding Achievement in Casting: Children's Television Series Programming	Nominated	
Artios Awards	2007	Carol Goldwasser and Howard Meltzer	Outstanding Achievement in Casting: Children's Television Series Programming	Won	
Artios Awards	2008	Carol Goldwasser and Howard Meltzer	Outstanding Achievement in Casting: Children's Television Series Programming	Won	
Artios Awards	2009	Carol Goldwasser and Howard Meltzer	Outstanding Achievement in Casting: Children's Television Series Programming	Nominated	
Artios Awards	2010	Carol Goldwasser and Howard Meltzer	Outstanding Achievement in Casting: Children's Television Series Programming	Nominated	
Artios Awards	2011	Carol Goldwasser and Howard Meltzer	Outstanding Achievement in Casting: Children's Television Series Programming	Nominated	
British Academy Children's Awards	2008	Hannah Montana	BAFTA Kids' Vote	Won	
British Academy Children's Awards	2009	Hannah Montana	BAFTA Kids' Vote: Television	Won	
Gracie Awards	2008	Miley Cyrus	Outstanding Female Lead – Comedy Series (Children/Adolescent)	Won	
Gracie Awards	2009	Miley Cyrus	Outstanding Female Lead – Comedy Series (Children/Adolescent)	Won	
Nickelodeon Kids' Choice Awards (Australia)	2008	Miley Cyrus	Fave International TV Star	Won	
Nickelodeon Kids' Choice Awards (Australia)	2008	Hannah Montana	Fave Comedy Show	Nominated	
Nickelodeon Kids' Choice Awards (Australia)	2009	Miley Cyrus	Fave International TV Star	Nominated	
Nickelodeon Kids' Choice Awards (United Kingdom)	2007	Hannah Montana	Best TV Show	Nominated	
Nickelodeon Kids' Choice Awards (United Kingdom)	2007	Miley Cyrus	Best TV Actress	Nominated	
Nickelodeon Kids' Choice Awards (United Kingdom)	2008	Hannah Montana	Favorite Kids' TV Show	Nominated	
Nickelodeon Kids' Choice Awards (United Kingdom)	2008	Miley Cyrus	Favorite Female TV Star	Won	
Nickelodeon Kids' Choice Awards (United States)	2007	Miley Cyrus	Favorite Television Actress	Won	
Nickelodeon Kids' Choice Awards (United States)	2008	Hannah Montana	Favorite TV Show	Nominated	
Nickelodeon Kids' Choice Awards (United States)	2008	Miley Cyrus	Favorite Television Actress	Won	
Nickelodeon Kids' Choice Awards (United States)	2009	Hannah Montana	Favorite TV Show	Nominated	
Nickelodeon Kids' Choice Awards (United States)	2009	Miley Cyrus	Favorite Television Actress	Nominated	
Nickelodeon Kids' Choice Awards (United States)	2010	Miley Cyrus	Favorite Television Actress	Nominated	
Nickelodeon Kids' Choice Awards (United States)	2011	Miley Cyrus	Favorite Television Actress	Nominated	
Primetime Emmy Awards	2007	Hannah Montana	Outstanding Children's Program	Nominated	
Primetime Emmy Awards	2008	Hannah Montana	Outstanding Children's Program	Nominated	
Primetime Emmy Awards	2009	Hannah Montana	Outstanding Children's Program	Nominated	
Primetime Emmy Awards	2010	Hannah Montana	Outstanding Children's Program	Nominated	
Teen Choice Awards	2007	Miley Cyrus	Choice TV Actress: Comedy	Won	
Teen Choice Awards	2007	Hannah Montana	Choice TV Show: Comedy	Won	
Teen Choice Awards	2008	Miley Cyrus	Choice TV Actress: Comedy	Won	
Teen Choice Awards	2008	Hannah Montana	Choice TV Show: Comedy	Won	
Teen Choice Awards	2009	Miley Cyrus	Choice TV Actress: Comedy	Won	
Teen Choice Awards	2009	Emily Osment	Choice TV: Sidekick	Won	
Teen Choice Awards	2009	Billy Ray Cyrus	Choice TV: Parental Unit	Won	
Teen Choice Awards	2009	Hannah Montana	Choice TV Show: Comedy	Won	
Teen Choice Awards	2011	Miley Cyrus	Choice TV Actress: Comedy	Nominated	
Television Critics Association Awards	2008	Hannah Montana	Outstanding Achievement in Children's Programming	Nominated	
Young Artist Awards	2007	Miley Cyrus	Best Performance in a TV Series (Comedy or Drama) – Leading Young Actress	Nominated	
Young Artist Awards	2007	Emily Osment	Best Performance in a TV Series (Comedy or Drama) – Supporting Young Actress	Nominated	
Young Artist Awards	2007	Cody Linley	Best Performance in a TV Series (Comedy or Drama) – Recurring Young Actor	Nominated	
Young Artist Awards	2007	Morgan York	Best Performance in a TV Series (Comedy or Drama) – Recurring Young Actress	Nominated	
Young Artist Awards	2008	Miley Cyrus	Best Performance in a TV Series – Leading Young Actress	Won	
Young Artist Awards	2008	Ryan Newman	Best Performance in a TV Series – Recurring Young Actress	Nominated	
Young Artist Awards	2008	Miley Cyrus, Emily Osment, Mitchel Musso, Moisés Arias and Cody Linley	Best Young Ensemble Performance in a TV Series	Nominated	
Young Artist Awards	2008	Hannah Montana	Best Family Television Series	Won	
Young Artist Awards	2009	Miley Cyrus	Best Performance in a TV Series (Comedy or Drama) – Leading Young Actress	Nominated	
Young Artist Awards	2009	Moisés Arias	Best Performance in a TV Series (Comedy or Drama) – Supporting Young Actor	Nominated	
Young Artist Awards	2009	Emily Osment	Best Performance in a TV Series (Comedy or Drama) – Supporting Young Actress	Nominated	
Young Artist Awards	2010	Miley Cyrus	Best Performance in a TV Series (Comedy or Drama) – Leading Young Actress	Nominated	
Young Artist Awards	2010	Nate Hartley	Best Performance in a TV Series – Guest Starring Young Actor 14 and Over	Won	
Young Artist Awards	2011	David Burrus	Best Performance in a TV Series – Guest Starring Young Actor 11–13	Nominated	
Young Artist Awards	2011	Mary-Charles Jones	Best Performance in a TV Series – Recurring Young Actress Ten and Under	Nominated	

== Controversies ==
=== Cyrus's public image ===
In 2008, Marsh commented on the importance of Cyrus maintaining a wholesome public image while starring on the network. He said, "for Miley Cyrus to be a 'good girl' is now a business decision for her". Cyrus, however, continued to develop an increasingly provocative image as Hannah Montana progressed and the series received criticism for appearing to be a negative influence on its younger audience. Pugh writes that the series acted as a natural appendage to Cyrus's "controversial transition into a sexual provocateur". Cyrus performed a pole dance the following year during her act at the Teen Choice Awards, later defending it as "right for the song and that performance", while Disney representatives did not comment. Her suggestive persona continued with the music video for "Can't Be Tamed" in 2010. The following year, Cyrus was listed as the worst celebrity influence in a JSYK poll voted on by children, following the leakage of a video showing her smoking the psychoactive plant Salvia divinorum at the age of eighteen. In the journal Tobacco Control, Cyrus's high-risk actions were described as a "turning point" for how fans perceived her behavior. Cyrus's public image continued to become more provocative and sexualized following the conclusion of the series. After a controversial performance at the 2013 MTV Video Music Awards, Melissa Henson of the Parents Television Council said parents would no longer feel comfortable allowing their children to watch Hannah Montana due to Cyrus's sexualized stage persona.

Billy Ray Cyrus blamed the program for damaging his family and causing Miley's unpredictable behavior. Miley Cyrus expressed her annoyance at her history with the program in 2013, stating she wanted to suppress her previous music and re-establish her career as a mature artist. By 2019, while Cyrus believed many had viewed her as a "Disney mascot" rather than as a person during her time working for the company, she said she was proud of her work on the series. She said she would like to play the character of Hannah Montana again. Cyrus has explained that she found it difficult to separate herself from the persona of Hannah Montana, and described the 20th anniversary special as "merging Hannah and Miley together".

=== Depiction of diabetes ===
A second-season episode titled "No Sugar, Sugar" was planned to air in the United States on November 2, 2008, but was removed from the schedule after complaints about its subject matter. The episode, in which Oliver is diagnosed with type 1 diabetes, was previewed online; viewers said it presented inaccurate information about the disorder. Some viewers said there was a risk of uninformed children following the episode's health information, while others commended the episode's themes of acceptance and support for diabetics. The network revised the episode after consulting diabetes research-funding organization JDRF and filming new scenes; an updated version of the episode titled "Uptight (Oliver's Alright)" was aired during the program's third season on September 20, 2009.

=== Lawsuits ===
Television writer Buddy Sheffield alleged he pitched the concept for a television series titled Rock and Roland to Disney Channel in 2001; it would have focused on a junior-high school student who leads a secret double life as a rock star. The initial proposal was unsuccessful, and in August 2007, Sheffield filed a lawsuit against the network based on the similarities between his pitch and Hannah Montana. The lawsuit said Sheffield was owed millions of dollars in damages. A trial was scheduled to begin in August 2008, but the case was resolved privately beforehand.

In April 2010, Correll and O'Brien filed a lawsuit against Disney Channel for $5 million over profits from the program. The pair alleged they were denied their share of profits based on requirements for creators from the Writers Guild of America West. Correll, who also directed a number of episodes, further alleged he was unfairly terminated by Disney in response to giving testimony within the arbitration. By 2016, it was reported the arbitrator found $18 million in under-reported amounts, but the franchise was still operating at a $24 million deficit so no compensation was owed. The pair took their case to open court and claimed they were prejudiced by their arbitrator; in 2018, however, the request to overturn the ruling was refused. Poryes had filed a similar lawsuit in October 2008, but this was ultimately settled.

== Other media ==
=== Films ===
In 2008, Walt Disney Pictures released a concert film, Hannah Montana and Miley Cyrus: Best of Both Worlds Concert, as a three-dimensional film for a limited theatrical run. The film consists of footage of Cyrus performing as herself and as Hannah Montana at a concert during the 2007–2008 Best of Both Worlds Tour. It earned a gross of $70.6 million worldwide. A soundtrack album of the live performances, Best of Both Worlds Concert, was released in April 2008.

In 2007, Cyrus reported plans to adapt the television series into a theatrical feature film had commenced, and that she would like to film it in her hometown, Nashville, Tennessee; production began in Los Angeles and Nashville in April 2008. Hannah Montana: The Movie, was originally scheduled for release on May 1, 2009, but its release was preponed to April 10 that year. The film, directed by Peter Chelsom, follows Miley as the popularity of Hannah Montana begins to take control of her life. It grossed $169.2 million worldwide. A soundtrack album, Hannah Montana: The Movie, was released in March 2009.

=== Merchandising ===
In December 2006, Disney released its first line of merchandise linked to Hannah Montana, which included clothing, jewelry, toys, and dolls; the line of clothing duplicated outfits Hannah wears in the series. A line of video games was also developed; the first, Hannah Montana, was released on the Nintendo DS on October 5, 2006. By February 2008, the Hannah Montana franchise had become so profitable Disney convened an "80-person, all-platform international meeting" to discuss its future. Disney's 2008 annual report to shareholders listed the brand as one of the leading contributors to growth across the company. MSNBC estimated the Hannah Montana franchise was worth $1 billion by the end of 2008. The program was a commercially successful franchise for Disney Channel.

=== Potential spin-off ===
In 2011, Billy Ray Cyrus had said he wanted to produce a prequel series. Hollywood Life reported in 2020 that a potential prequel about Miley Stewart's rise to fame as a pop singer, with another child actor playing the character, was being discussed for Disney+. Billy Ray Cyrus again expressed his interest in being involved, while reports said Miley Cyrus would not be.

=== Hannah Montana 20th Anniversary Special ===
The anniversary television special Hannah Montana 20th Anniversary Special was released on Disney+ and Hulu on March 24, 2026. It was filmed in front of a studio audience and hosted by podcaster Alex Cooper. The special was produced by HopeTown Entertainment and Unwell Productions. Ashley Edens served as showrunner, with Cyrus, Tish Cyrus-Purcell, Cooper, and Matt Kaplan as executive producers. Selena Gomez and Chappell Roan made appearances as special guests. For the special, Cyrus performed "The Best of Both Worlds", "This Is the Life", and "The Climb" to invited fans, and debuted a new song entitled "Younger You". The special received 6.3 million viewers in its first three days of streaming.
