= List of Hannah Montana home video releases =

The following is a list of Hannah Montana home video releases. The series has been released to DVD in Regions 1, 2, and 4.

== Region 1 (United States and Canada) ==
=== Volume releases ===
#	DVD title	Release date	Episodes featured	Bonus features
1	Livin' The Rock Star Life	USA/CAN: October 24, 2006	This volume includes the episodes: "Money For Nothing, Guilt for Free"; "Lilly, Do You Want to Know a Secret?"; "Miley Get Your Gum"; "I Can't Make You Love Hannah If You Don't"	Miley On Following Your Dreams! Exclusive Interview With Miley; Miley's Audition Tapes; "The Best of Both Worlds" music video
2	Pop Star Profile	USA/CAN: June 26, 2007	This volume includes the episodes: "New Kid in School"; "More Than a Zombie to Me"; "Good Golly, Miss Dolly"; "People Who Use People"	"The Real Miley Cyrus" Spend A Fun-Filled Day With Miley, Her Family And The Hannah Montana Costars; "Nobody's Perfect" Live Concert Performance
3	Life's What You Make It	USA/CAN: October 9, 2007	This volume includes the episodes: "Achy Jakey Heart, Part 1"; "Achy Jakey Heart, Part 2"; "I Am Hannah, Hear Me Croak"; "I Want You to Want Me... to Go to Florida"	Backstage Disney: "Backstage Pass: The Secrets of Hannah Montana"; Music & More: "Ready, Set, Don't Go" music video, by Billy Ray Cyrus
4	One in a Million	USA/CAN: January 29, 2008	This volume includes the episodes: "Lilly's Mom Has Got It Goin' On"; "Me and Mr. Jonas and Mr. Jonas and Mr. Jonas"; "I Will Always Loathe You"; "That's What Friends Are For?"	Backstage Disney: "Come Feud with Me: The Top 10 Disney Channel Character Feuds"; Music & More: "One in a Million" music video; "True Friend" music video; "Run Raven Run" (That's So Raven episode)
5	Keeping It Real	USA/CAN: March 31, 2009	This volume includes the episodes: "The Test of My Love"; "Don't Stop 'Til You Get the Phone"; "Yet Another Side of Me"; "We're All on This Date Together"; "Ready, Set, Don't Drive" (as Bonus episode)	Bonus episode: "Ready, Set, Don't Drive"; Backstage Disney: "Miley's Makeover: Hannah Gets A New Look"
6	Miley Says Goodbye?	USA/CAN: March 9, 2010	This volume includes the episodes: "Papa's Got a Brand New Friend"; "Promma Mia"; "He Could Be The One" (1 hour); "Miley Says Goodbye? Part 1"; "Miley Says Goodbye? Part 2"; "You Never Give Me My Money" (as Bonus episode)	"He Could Be The One" Alternate Ending; Hannah's Highlights: "You Never Give Me My Money" Episode; Sister Secrets - Miley's Real-Life Sister Reveals Another Side Of Miley!
7	Who is Hannah Montana?	USA/CAN: November 2, 2010	This volume includes the episodes: "Lilly, Do You Want to Know a Secret?"; "Miley Get Your Gum"; "Achy Jakey Heart, Part 1"; "Achy Jakey Heart, Part 2"; "Ready, Set, Don't Drive"; "De-Do-Do-Do, Da-Don't-Don't, Don't, Tell My Secret"; "I'll Always Remember You" (1 hour)	Sneak Peek Trailer of Ashley Tisdale's Upcoming Disney Channel Original Movie Sharpay's Fabulous Adventure

=== Disney's mixed releases ===
DVD title	Release date	Episodes featured	Bonus features
That's So Suite Life of Hannah Montana	USA/CAN: January 16, 2007	"Checkin' Out" (That's So Raven); "That's So Suite Life of Hannah Montana" (The Suite Life of Zack & Cody); "On the Road Again" (Hannah Montana)	"Who Said" music video performed by Miley Cyrus
Wish Gone Amiss	USA/CAN: November 27, 2007	"Gone Wishin'" (Cory in the House); "Super Twins" (The Suite Life of Zack & Cody); "When You Wish You Were the Star" (Hannah Montana)	"I Wish I May, I Wish I Might: A Guide to Making Wishes", hosted by Jason Earles
Wizards on Deck With Hannah Montana	USA/CAN: September 22, 2009	"Cast-Away (To Another Show)" (Wizards of Waverly Place); "Double Crossed" (The Suite Life on Deck); "Super(stitious) Girl" (Hannah Montana)	Justin's Award Winning Essay; It's A Suite Life Having Fun With Hannah & The Wizards

=== Other releases ===
DVD title	Release date	Additional info	Bonus features
Hannah Montana & Miley Cyrus: Best of Both Worlds Concert	USA/CAN: August 19, 2008	Recalling the successful theatrical gimmick, the home video releases are vowed to be sold "for a limited time only". It is on Blu-ray and Disney DVD and is in 3-D, was the first for a Blu-ray release. The DVD release features four versions of the movie. It's possible to choose between 1:85:1 and 1:33:1, both available in 2D and 3D. The Blu-ray release features both 2D and 3D but in 1.85:1 only. A bonus DVD, On the Road with Miley, was released exclusively to US Wal-Mart stores along with the Disney DVD version of the concert.	"Music & More": "S.O.S" live performance, by Jonas Brothers; "Good and Broken" live performance; "Sing along with the movie" mode; "The Ultimate Personal Tour"
Hannah Montana: The Movie	USA/CAN: August 18, 2009	The film was released in theaters on April 10, 2009 in the United States and Canada.	Dylan & Cole Sprouse: Blu-ray Is Suite!; Four deleted scenes; "Fun with Hannah & The Gang" (outtakes); "The Climb" music video; "Backstage Disney": "Find Your Way Back Home"; "I Should Have Gone to Film School - With Jason Earles"; Audio commentary by director Peter Chelsom; Only on the Blu-ray version: "Back to Tennessee" music video, by Billy Ray Cyrus; "You'll Always Find Your Way Back Home" music video; "Let's Get Crazy" music video; "The Climb (Movie version)" music video; "Bless the Broken Road" music video, by Rascal Flatts; "Crazier" music video, by Taylor Swift; "The Hoedown Home Experience": "Everybody Now..."; "Learn the Moves"
Hannah Montana Forever	US: 2010	Released exclusively to US Wal-Mart stores. Contains four episodes: Two from the fourth season of Hannah Montana and two from the third season of Hannah Montana.	Hannah's Highlights: "Miley Hurt the Feelings of the Radio Star" episode

=== Season releases ===
DVD title	Release date	Episodes	Additional info	Bonus features
The Complete First Season	USA/CAN: November 18, 2008	26	This four disc box set includes all 26 episodes from Season 1.	Backstage Disney: "Back Home Again With Miley"; 2008 Disney Channel Games - Kickoff Episode; Hannah's Highlights
Hannah Montana Forever: Final Season	USA/CAN: March 8, 2011	13	This two disc box set includes all 13 episodes from Season 4.	Alternate Ending to the Series Finale; From Auditions to Wrap: The Cast Looks Back; Cast Goodbyes

According to Amazon.com, Seasons 2 and 3 will be released; however, no dates have been announced.

== Region 2 (Europe, Turkey, Algeria, Saudi Arabia, Japan, South Africa) ==
=== Volume releases ===
#	DVD title	Release date	Episodes featured	Bonus features
1	Behind The Spot Light	GBR: March 23, 2007 DEU: September 13, 2007 FRA: October 3, 2007	"Money for Nothing, Guilt for Free" (never-before-seen episode at time of release); "Lilly, Do You Want to Know a Secret?" (pilot episode); "Miley Get Your Gum"; "I Can't Make You Love Hannah If You Don't"	Miley Cyrus Exclusive Interview on Following Your Dreams; Miley's Audition Tapes; "The Best of Both Worlds" music video
2	Pop Star Profile	GBR: October 29, 2007 DEU: March 6, 2008 FRA: March 19, 2008	"New Kid in School"; "More Than a Zombie to Me"; "Good Golly Miss Dolly"; "People Who Use People"	"Nobody's Perfect" music video; A Day with Miley Cyrus and Her Family
3	Life's What You Make It	GBR: March 10, 2008	"Achy Jakey Heart, Part 1"; "Achy Jakey Heart, Part 2"; "I Am Hannah, Hear Me Croak"; "I Want You to Want Me ... To Go to Florida"	Hannah Montana Backstage Pass; "Ready, Set, Don't Go" music video by Billy Ray Cyrus
4	One in a Million	GBR: September 15, 2008	"Lilly's Mom Has Got It Goin' On"; "Me and Mr. Jonas and Mr. Jonas and Mr. Jonas"; "I Will Always Loathe You"; "That's What Friends Are For?"	That's So Raven episode "Run Raven Run"; "Come Feud with Me" - The top 10 Disney Channel feuds; "One in a Million" music video; "True Friend" music video

=== Disney's mixed releases ===
DVD title	Release date	Episodes featured	Bonus features
That's So Suite Life of Hannah Montana	GBR: April 21, 2008	"Checkin' Out" (That's So Raven); "That's So Suite Life of Hannah Montana" (The Suite Life of Zack & Cody); "On the Road Again" (Hannah Montana)	"Who Said" music video
Wish Gone Amiss	GBR: September 1, 2008	"Gone Wishin'" (Cory in the House); "Super Twins" (The Suite Life of Zack & Cody); "When You Wish You Were the Star" (Hannah Montana)	"I Wish I May, I Wish I Might: A Guide to Making Wishes" hosted by Jason Earles of Hannah Montana.

=== Other releases ===
DVD title	Release date	Additional info	Bonus features
Triple Pack	GBR: May 5, 2008	Includes the first 3 volumes: Behind The Spot Light, Pop Star Profile and Life Is What You Make It.	All Bonus features included in the individual volumes.
Hannah Montana & Miley Cyrus: Best of Both Worlds Concert	DEU: October 16, 2008 GBR: November 3, 2008 ROM: April 14, 2009	Recalling the successful theatrical gimmick, the home video releases are vowed to be sold "for a limited time only". It is on Blu-ray and Disney DVD and is in 3-D, was the first for a Blu-ray release. The DVD release features four versions of the movie. It's possible to choose between 1:85:1 and 1:33:1, both available in 2D and 3D. The Blu-ray release features both 2D and 3D but in 1.85:1 only.	"Music & More": "S.O.S" live performance, by Jonas Brothers; "Good and Broken" live performance; "Sing along with the movie" mode; "The Ultimate Personal Tour"
Hannah Montana: The Movie	GBR: September 7, 2009 DEU: October 8, 2009 SLO: November 2, 2009 ROM: September 19, 2009	The film was released in theaters on April 10, 2009 in the United States and Canada.	Dylan & Cole Sprouse: Blu-ray Is Suite!; Four deleted scenes; "Fun with Hannah & The Gang" (outtakes); "The Climb" music video; "Backstage Disney": "Find Your Way Back Home"; "I Should Have Gone to Film School - With Jason Earles"; Audio commentary by director Peter Chelsom; Only on the Blu-ray version: "Back to Tennessee" music video, by Billy Ray Cyrus; "You'll Always Find Your Way Back Home" music video; "Let's Get Crazy" music video; "The Climb (Movie version)" music video; "Bless the Broken Road" music video, by Rascal Flatts; "Crazier" music video, by Taylor Swift; "The Hoedown Home Experience": "Everybody Now..."; "Learn the Moves"

=== Season releases ===
DVD title	Release date	Episodes	Additional info	Bonus features
The Complete First Season	JPN: March 31, 2008 DEU: October 16, 2008 FRA: October 22, 2008 DK: March 31, 2009 GBR: May 4, 2009 ROM: February 14, 2009 RUS: August 6, 2009 POL: 17 November 2009	26	This four disc box set includes all 26 episodes from Season 1.	Backstage Disney: Back home again with Miley; Fan-nah Montana; Hannah's Highlights
Season 2	DK: November 3, 2009 FRA: October 21, 2009 GBR: December 2010 JPN: October 7, 2009 DEU: September 10, 2009 SLO: November 2, 2009 ROM: 2010 POL: 17 November 2009	29	This four disc box set includes all Season 2 episodes, except for "No Sugar, Sugar". Eastern Europe release consists of five disc set, in which the last disc contains some more bonus features.	Backstage Pass: The Secrets of Hannah Montana; "One in a Million" music video; "True Friend" music video; "Ready, Set, Don't Go" music video; Hannah's Highlights
Season 2 Volume 1	ESP: April 2, 2009 DK: April 14, 2009 GBR: July 6, 2009 ROM: February 14, 2009	7	This volume includes the episodes: "Me and Rico Down by the School Yard"; "Cuffs Will Keep Us Together"; "You Are So Sue-able to Me"; "Get Down, Study-udy-udy"; "I Am Hannah, Hear Me Croak"; "You Gotta Not Fight for Your Right to Party"; "My Best Friend's Boyfriend".	Backstage Pass: The Secrets of Hannah Montana; Music video: "One in a Million"; Music video: "True Friend"
Season 2 Volume 2	DK: April 14, 2009 ESP: June 4, 2009 GBR: July 20, 2009 ROM: September 19, 2009	8	This volume includes the episodes: "Take This Job and Love It"; "Achey Jakey Heart, Part 1"; "Achey Jakey Heart, Part 2"; "Sleepwalk This Way"; "When You Wish You Were the Star"; "I Want You to Want Me... to Go to Florida"; "Everybody Was Best Friend Fighting"; "Song Sung Bad".	"Ready, Set, Don't Go" music video
Season 2 Volume 3	DK: June 2, 2009 ESP: April 2, 2009 GBR: August 3, 2009 ROM: February 22, 2010	7	This volume includes the episodes: "Me and Mr. Jonas and Mr. Jonas and Mr. Jonas"; "Don't Stop 'Til You Get the Phone"; "That's What Friends Are For?"; "Lilly's Mom Has Got It Goin' On"; "I Will Always Loathe You"; "Bye Bye Ball"; "(We're So Sorry) Uncle Earl".	Hannah's Highlights - "Lilly's Mom Has Got It Goin' On"
Season 2 Volume 4	DK: June 2, 2009 GBR: August 17, 2009 ROM: March, 2010	7	This volume includes the episodes: "The Way We Almost Weren't"; "You Didn't Say It Was Your Birthday"; "Hannah in the Streets with Diamonds"; "Yet Another Side of Me"; "The Test of My Love"; "Joannie B. Goode"; "We're All on This Date Together".	Backstage Disney: "Miley's Makeover: Hannah Gets a New Look"
Season 3	DEU, GBR: July 11, 2011 POL: June 2, 2010 DK: November 9, 2010	30	This four disc box set includes all Season 3 episodes, with the episode "He Could Be The One" split into two parts and the episode "Uptight (Oliver's Alright)" missing.	Even More Sister Secrets; The Best of Both Worlds and Crew; Hannah's Highlights; Jake or Jesse; Alternate Episode Ending of "He Could Be The One"; The Golden Nonsense Awards (Now with even more nibblets!)
Season 3 Volume 1	GBR: May 10, 2010 FRA: February 17, 2010	8	This volume includes the episodes: "He Ain't a Hottie, He's My Brother"; "Ready, Set, Don't Drive"; "Don't Go Breaking My Tooth"; "You Never Give Me My Money"; "Killing Me Softly With His Height"; "Would I Lie To You, Lilly?"; "You Gotta Lose This Job"; "Welcome to the Bungle".	Even More Sister Secrets; Dylan & Cole Sprouse: Blu-ray Is Suite!
Season 3 Volume 2	GBR: June 7, 2010	7	This volume includes the episodes: "Papa's Got a Brand New Friend"; "Cheat It"; "Knock Knock Knockin' on Jackson's Head"; "You Give Lunch a Bad Name"; "What I Don't Like About You"; "Promma Mia", "Once, Twice, Three Times Afraidy"	The Best Of Both Worlds: Cast Sync-Tacular!; Dylan & Cole Sprouse: Blu-ray Is Suite!
Season 3 Volume 3	GBR: July 5, 2010	7	This volume includes the episodes: "Jake... Another Little Piece of My Heart"; "Miley Hurt the Feelings of the Radio Star"; "He Could Be the One (part 1)"; "He Could Be the One (part 2)"; "Super(stitious) Girl"; "I Honestly Love You (No, Not You)"; "For (Give) a Little Bit"	"He Could Be the One" Alternate Ending; Hannah Montana's Highlights: Miley Hurt Feeling of the Radio Star; Dylan & Cole Sprouse: Blu-ray Is Suite!
Season 3 Volume 4	GBR: August 9, 2010	8	This volume includes the episodes: "B-B-B-Bad to the Chrome"; "Judge Me Tender"; "Can't Get Home to You Girl"; "Come Fail Away"; "Got to Get Her Out of My House"; "The Wheel Near My Bed (Keeps on Turnin')"; "Miley Says Goodbye? Part 1"; "Miley Says Goodbye? Part 2"	Dylan & Cole Sprouse: Blu-ray Is Suite!; Music & More: The Golden Sweet Niblet Awards (Now With Even More Niblets)
Season 4	GBR: August 8, 2011	13	This two-disc box set includes all Hannah Montana season 4 episodes.	Alternate ending to the series finale; Cast goodbyes; From Audition To Wrap: The Cast Looks Back

== Region 4 (Australia, New Zealand, Mexico, Caribbean, and South America) ==
=== Volume releases ===
#	DVD title	Release date	Episodes featured	Bonus features
1	Behind The Spot Light	AUS: September 12, 2007	"Money for Nothing, Guilt for Free" (never-before-seen episode at time of release); "Lilly, Do You Want to Know a Secret?" (pilot episode); "Miley Get Your Gum"; "I Can't Make You Love Hannah If You Don't"	Miley Cyrus Exclusive Interview on Following Your Dreams; Miley's Audition Tapes; "The Best of Both Worlds" music video
2	Pop Star Profile	AUS: March 4, 2008	"New Kid in School"; "More Than a Zombie to Me"; "Good Golly Miss Dolly"; "People Who Use People"	"Nobody's Perfect" music video; A Day with Miley Cyrus and Her Family

=== Disney's mixed releases ===
DVD title	Release date	Episodes featured	Bonus features
That's So Suite Life of Hannah Montana	AUS: July 2, 2008	"Checkin' Out" (That's So Raven); "That's So Suite Life of Hannah Montana" (The Suite Life of Zack & Cody); "On the Road Again" (Hannah Montana)	"Who Said" music video

=== Other releases ===
DVD title	Release date	Additional info	Bonus features
Hannah Montana & Miley Cyrus: Best of Both Worlds Concert	AUS: October 8, 2008 ARG: August 19, 2008	Recalling the successful theatrical gimmick, the home video releases are vowed to be sold "for a limited time only". It is in 3-D.	The Ultimate Personal Tour- Hang Out with Miley Cyrus and the Jonas Brothers during the tour; Sing Along Mode; Additional songs not seen in theaters: "Right Here"; "Pumpin' Up the Party"; Miley Cyrus - "Start All Over" music video; Jonas Brothers - "When You Look Me in the Eyes" music video

=== Season releases ===
Name	Release Date	Episodes	Additional information	Bonus Features
The Complete First Season	AUS: November 5, 2008 BRA: March 4, 2009	26	This four disc set includes all 26 episodes from Season 1.	Back Home Again With Miley; Hannah's Highlights; "Grandmas, Don't Let Your Babies Grow Up to Play Favourites"; "You're So Vain, You Probably Think This Zit Is About You"; "Torn Between Two Hannahs"; "The Idol Side of Me"
The Complete Second Season	AUS: November 25, 2009 MX: December 2, 2009 BRA: September 2, 2009	29	This five disc box set includes all Season 2 episodes, except for "No Sugar, Sugar".	Hannah Montana: Backstage Pass; Miley's Makeover: Hannah Gets a New Look; The 1st Annual Sweet Nibblets Awards; Sister's Secrets; Hannah Montana's Guide for Surviving High School; Hannah's Highlights: "Lilly's Mom Has Got It Goin' On"; "One in a Million" music video; "True Friend" music video; "Ready, Set, Don't Go" music video, by Billy Ray Cyrus
Season 2 Volume 1	COL: 2009	7		Música y Más; Disney detrás de cámaras
Season 2 Part 1	AUS: April 1, 2009	15	This two disc set includes 15 episodes from Season 2.	Hannah Montana: Backstage Pass; "One in a Million" music video; "True Friend" music video; "Ready, Set, Don't Go" music video, by Billy Ray Cyrus
Season 2 Part 2	AUS: June 3, 2009	14	This two disc set includes 14 episodes from Season 2. Note: the episode "No Sugar, Sugar" is not included.	Hannah's Highlights: "Lilly's Mom Has Got It Goin' On"; Miley's Makeover: Hannah Gets A New Look
The Complete Third Season	AUS: November 3, 2010 BRA: January 19, 2011	30	This four disc set includes all 30 episodes from Season 3.	Even More Sister Secrets; The Best Of Both Worlds: Cast Sync-Tacular!; "He Could Be the One" - Alternate Ending; Hannah's Highlights: Miley Hurt The Feelings Of The Radio Star; The Golden Sweet Niblet Awards (Now With Even More Niblets!)
Season 3 Volume 1	COL: Unknown			
Season 3 Volume 2	COL: Unknown			
Season 3 Volume 4	COL: Unknown			
The Complete Fourth Season	AUS: 8 June 2011 BRA: 2011	13	This two disc set includes all 13 episodes from Hannah Montana Forever (TV series)	Cast goodbyes; Exclusive Final Season Alternate Ending

Hannah Montana DVDs are available in New Zealand, but they can only be bought online.
