= Hannah Montana season 1 =

Hannah Montana
- Season 1
- DVD cover
- Starring: Miley Cyrus; Emily Osment; Mitchel Musso; Jason Earles; Billy Ray Cyrus
- No. of episodes: 26

Release
- Original network: Disney Channel
- Original release: March 24, 2006 – March 30, 2007

Season chronology
- Next → Season 2

The first season of the television series Hannah Montana was aired on Disney Channel from March 24, 2006, to March 30, 2007, and included 26 episodes. It introduces the five main characters of the series and Miley Stewart's situation of living a secret double life as a teen pop star. The season also introduces several significant recurring characters such as Roxy Roker, Jake Ryan, and Rico Suave.

The season's soundtrack was released on October 24, 2006, under the title Hannah Montana. The season itself was released on DVD as a four disc set on November 18, 2008, by Disney DVD. Certain individual episodes had been released earlier on other Hannah Montana DVDs.

== Production ==
Hannah Montana debuted Friday, March 24, 2006, on Disney Channel with "Lilly, Do You Want to Know a Secret?" The first season completed its run on March 30, 2007, with "Bad Moose Rising". In the United Kingdom it first aired in the summer period of 2006, then the first series aired on free-to-view channel Five showing all episodes, the second series then aired in 2009. The first season consists of 26 colored, full-screen, approx. 23-minute episodes (without ads) recorded using a multiple-camera setup. Production began on November 7, 2005, and ended in September 2006.

== Casting ==
Season 1 cast L-R: Mitchel Musso, Emily Osment, Miley Cyrus, Billy Ray Cyrus, Jason Earles

The show's five stars — Miley Cyrus, Emily Osment, Mitchel Musso, Jason Earles, and Billy Ray Cyrus — appear in all first-season episodes.

Recurring cast are Moises Arias as Rico, Andre Kinney as Cooper, Shanica Knowles as Amber Addison, Anna Maria Perez de Tagle as Ashley Dewitt, Greg Baker as Francis Corelli, Morgan York as Sarah, Cody Linley as Leslie "Jake" Ryan, Romi Dames as Traci Van Horn, Dolly Parton as Aunt Dolly, Vicki Lawrence as Mamaw Ruthie, and Frances Callier as Roxy.

There were many guest stars including Corbin Bleu as Johnny Collins, Paul Vogt as Dontzig, Matt Winston as Fermine, Ashley Tisdale as Maddie Fitzpatrick, and Lisa Arch as Liza the photographer.

Co-stars for this season are Derek Basco, Kyle Kaplan, Creagen Dow, Jack Taylor, Blake Berris, Frances Bay, Christian Serratos, Ryan Newman, Summer Bishil, Kunal Sharma, Cutter Garcia, Helen Duffy, Jeff Mallare, Betsy Kelso, Noah Cyrus, Aimee Teegarden, Gena DeVivo, Destiny Edmond, Jay Brian Winnick, Dollar Tan, Jason Thornton, Gary Pease, Marius Mazmanian, and Alec Leddand.

== Episodes ==
- This season consists of twenty-six episodes.
- The series premiere with "Lilly, Do You Want to Know a Secret?" had 5.4 million viewers breaking the highest-rated series premiere on a kids network in seven years and was the highest rated Disney Channel series premiere until Cory in the House. In the episode, Miley reveals to Lilly that she is Hannah Montana.
- Season 1 included a special episode called "On the Road Again?" that was part of "That's So Suite Life of Hannah Montana". The episode had cross-overs with shows That's So Raven and The Suite Life of Zack & Cody.

No. overall	No. in season	Title	Directed by	Written by	Original release date	Prod. code	Viewers (millions)
1	1	"Lilly, Do You Want to Know a Secret?"	Lee Shallat-Chemel	Story by : Michael Poryes & Rich Correll & Barry O'Brien; Teleplay by : Michael Poryes & Gary Dontzig & Steven Peterman	March 24, 2006	101	5.4
Lilly Truscott (Emily Osment) buys two tickets to see a Hannah Montana concert for her and her best friend Miley (Miley Cyrus). Because Miley secretly is Hannah Montana, she says she can't go, so Lilly goes to the concert with Oliver Oken (Miley and Lilly's friend). After sneaking into her dressing room, she finds out that Miley is Hannah Montana, so Miley shows Lilly her secret Hannah closet. However, when Lilly tries to convince Miley she should tell her secret to her school, Miley tells Lilly why it's a terrible idea, and they get into a bad fight, but make up soon after. Meanwhile, Jackson (Miley's older brother) tries to impress a girl by telling her he knows Hannah Montana and could get free tickets for her next show.
2	2	"Miley Get Your Gum"	David Kendall	Michael Poryes	March 31, 2006	103	4.0
Oliver still doesn't know Miley is Hannah. When he tells her that he loves Hannah, Miley and Lilly try to get him to turn his attention to other girls, since Miley is worried that if she told him the truth he'd be in love with her too. The girls come up with a plan to get Oliver to hate Hannah. Oliver and Hannah meet up at Malibu beach and she chews gum since Oliver hates it, but the plan backfires. Eventually, Miley reveals to Oliver that she is Hannah Montana, causing him to faint. Meanwhile, Jackson accidentally buys a "girl's car", and he tries to get Robby to get rid of it.
3	3	"She's a Supersneak"	David Kendall	Kim Friese	April 7, 2006	105	N/A
Despite their father telling them that they can't go to a movie premiere because they have to study for their mid-terms, Miley sneaks out with Lilly and Oliver after they convince her, while Jackson also sneaks out separately with his friend Cooper. When they both find out that they sneaked out, they see Robby with a woman at the movie theater when he said he was attending a meeting, so they try to find more information about the woman. Miley feels betrayed and very hurt, thinking Robbie is trying to replace her beloved mother, who died three years ago, which in the series is who she wrote the song "I Miss You" for.
4	4	"I Can't Make You Love Hannah if You Don't"	Roger S. Christiansen	Kim Friese	April 14, 2006	108	3.9
Miley has a crush on a ninth grader at school, but finds out that he hates Hannah Montana. Miley decides to forget about him, but then he decides to take her to a Hannah Montana concert to give Hannah a chance. At the concert, Miley runs back and forth, trying to do the concert and be with the boy at the same time. After several instances of this, the guy leaves without telling Miley. Miley is saddened, but her father assures her that someday, she'll meet a guy who likes everything about her.
5	5	"It's My Party and I'll Lie if I Want To"	Roger S. Christiansen	Douglas Lieblein	April 21, 2006	102	N/A
Because she is embarrassing, Traci (Hannah's producer's daughter) uninvites Lola (Lilly) to Kelly Clarkson's birthday party, and Miley has to hide it from her. The next day, newspaper headlines sport out Hannah "attacking" a paparazzi for taking photographs, and Miley tries to hide the evidence that she went to the party, since she told Lilly it was cancelled. Meanwhile, Jackson's hair is being used by a girl named Nina to practice her hair-styling techniques. What Jackson doesn't know is that she was hired by Rico to do so.
6	6	"Grandmas Don't Let Your Babies Grow Up to Play Favorites"	Roger S. Christiansen	Douglas Lieblein	April 28, 2006	109	N/A
Hannah gets to perform in front of Her Majesty The Queen and her granddaughter, but a visit from Miley and Jackson's grandma "Mammaw" makes Miley feel badly hurt because she's here for Jackson's volleyball tournament. The queen is late for Hannah's performance, which stalls the tournament. Hannah finishes her song quickly, making just enough time to make it to the end of Jackson's tournament, but at the same time trying to not let fans mob her at the last minute.
7	7	"It's a Mannequin's World"	Roger S. Christiansen	Howard Meyers	May 12, 2006	110	N/A
Miley fears that Robby will get her a horrible birthday present after having horrific experiences with her previous ones, so she sends Lilly to help Robby pick an awesome birthday present, while Miley poses as the store's Hannah Montana mannequin. When she thinks he is getting her a jacket she liked, Robbie actually bought her a kitty sweater that meows when you press it, which makes Miley feel embarrassed towards others who are making fun of her. Miley still thanks her father for a great birthday. Somebody brought the jacket and gave it to Miley. Meanwhile, Jackson has troubles delivering a cake to Miley's birthday party, so Cooper helps him.
8	8	"Mascot Love"	Roger S. Christiansen	Sally Lapiduss	May 26, 2006	111	N/A
Miley and Lilly want to spend more time together, so they try out for cheerleading. Unfortunately, Lilly makes the squad while Miley becomes the mascot, which makes her jealous. Meanwhile, Robby bets Jackson $50 that he can't fix the sink.
9	9	"Ooo, Ooo, Itchy Woman"	David Kendall	Gary Dontzig & Steven Peterman	June 10, 2006	104	3.7
After finding out Miley and Lilly have to share a tent with Amber and Ashley on a class camping trip, they hatch a plan to get back at them. This backfires when they catch poison oak. Meanwhile, Jackson and Robby try to catch a mouse.
10	10	"O Say, Can You Remember the Words?"	Lee Shallat-Chemel	Sally Lapiduss	June 30, 2006	113	3.0
Miley and Oliver get partnered up for a project by performing a play, but Miley bails on Oliver after telling Robby that he is a horrible partner. This causes her to forget the words to the American national anthem at a basketball game. Meanwhile, Jackson goes on a sugar high after keeping Rico's candy away from him.
11	11	"Oops! I Meddled Again!"	Chip Hurd	Lisa Albert	July 15, 2006	107	N/A
Miley and Lilly receive a Hannah e-mail from a girl at Miley's school who informs them that she likes Oliver. They try to set them up together, and backfires when she sends them an e-mail that she wants to break up with her "boyfriend", which makes Lilly and Miley think that she wanted to break up with Oliver. However, it was really her ex-boyfriend that she wanted to dump. Meanwhile, Rico makes Jackson wear a chicken suit to advertise Rico's chicken wings due to something Cooper said and gets humiliated repeatedly as a result of it.
12	12	"On the Road Again?" (Note: Part 3 of "That's So Suite Life of Hannah Montana")	Roger S. Christiansen	Steven James Meyer	July 28, 2006	112	7.1
Hannah befriends Maddie Fitzpatrick (Ashley Tisdale) at the Tipton, who informs her on how famous Robbie Ray once was and claiming Hannah's "holding him back". This makes Miley feel guilty for forcing him to end his own singing career to begin Hannah's, and vows to get her father back on track. But when Robbie takes an offer to a week tour, he brings Roxy over to look after Milet and Jackson. When Roxy's supervision proves to be too much, Miley and Jackson head to San Diego to bring their father back home.
13	13	"You're So Vain, You Probably Think This Zit is About You"	Chip Hurd	Todd J. Greenwald	August 12, 2006	106	N/A
Miley tries, but fails, not to be bothered by an unflattering Hannah Montana billboard showcasing a zit in hopes of making Lilly feel less self-conscious about having to wear her eyeglasses for a skateboarding competition after she loses her contacts, with Miley convincing Lilly that looks don't matter. Meanwhile, Rico tricks Jackson into becoming his magic assistant, wearing a women's ensemble and called "The Lovely Tina", although Jackson gets revenge on Rico in the end.
14	14	"New Kid in School"	Kenneth Shapiro	Todd J. Greenwald	August 18, 2006	114	3.7
Superstar Jake Ryan from the TV series "Zombie High" enrolls in Miley's school. Miley becomes jealous of how he's being treated at school because of his fame and as a result, tells a reporter about her secret identity. However, she quickly backtracks and afterward has to convince the reporter that it's all in her head. Meanwhile, Jackson borrows and scratches Robbie's new car while picking up a girl he's dating and Robbie rips the front passenger door off Jackson's old car.
15	15	"More Than a Zombie to Me"	Roger S. Christiansen	Steven Peterman	September 8, 2006	116	3.6
Jake Ryan asks Miley to the school dance but she turns him down both times. After Hannah guest stars on Jake's TV show and almost kisses him, Miley realizes that she really does have feelings for him, so she tries to get him to take her back, but he's already taking Lilly to the dance. Meanwhile, Robby and Jackson pull pranks on each other to see who's the prank master, which makes them not answer the door to a $10 million novelty check.
16	16	"Good Golly, Miss Dolly"	Roger S. Christiansen	Sally Lapiduss	September 29, 2006	118	3.0
When Miley's godmother, Aunt Dolly (Dolly Parton), visits Malibu, she accidentally records a video tape of Miley saying that she's "totally in love" with Jake and then Oliver mixes it up with his own tape which Jake has to edit. Aunt Dolly also turns the house more girly and pink, sending Robby and Jackson to extremes to preserve their "manliness".
17	17	"Torn Between Two Hannahs"	Roger S. Christiansen	Story by : Valerie Ahern & Christian McLaughlin; Teleplay by : Todd J. Greenwald	October 14, 2006	126	4.31
Miley's evil identical cousin, Luann (Miley Cyrus), from Tennessee visits, and disguises herself as Hannah in order to reveal Miley's secret at Traci Van Horne's Halloween party. Meanwhile, Robby and Jackson decorate their house to make it look scarier than Dontzig's.
18	18	"People Who Use People"	Shannon Flynn	Michael Poryes	November 3, 2006	119	4.6
Miley and Jake date other people in order to make each other jealous of the other, though it results in the pair finally admitting their feelings and kissing; Jackson uses Robby to get an "A" in Math class by hooking him up with his strict teacher, Ms. Kunkle, but that was not a good idea!
19	19	"Money for Nothing, Guilt for Free"	Roger S. Christiansen	Heather Wordham	November 26, 2006 (Note: This episode was first released in Livin' the Rock Star Life DVD on October 24, 2006.)	115	4.63
Miley uses her Hannah Montana power to her full advantage as she competes in a fundraising event against Amber and Ashley to help Sarah; Jackson tries to beat Robby at a game after learning that all his previous 'victories' only happened because Robby was letting him win.
20	20	"Debt It Be"	Roger S. Christiansen	Sally Lapiduss & Heather Wordham	December 1, 2006	120	3.5
Miley and Jackson both receive new credit cards and promise to use them in "emergencies only", but when Lilly convinces Miley to go to a flea market with her credit card, she buys almost everything there. In order to pay off the bill, Miley sells Hannah's used clothes and accessories that she thinks that she'll "probably never have to wear again". When she finds out a pair of earrings from a video shoot are worth more money than she sold them for, she and Jackson go to extremes to retrieve them from the little old lady who bought them.
21	21	"My Boyfriend's Jackson and There's Gonna Be Trouble"	Roger S. Christiansen	Andrew Green & Sally Lapiduss	January 1, 2007	124	3.98
When a tabloid picture makes Hannah and Jackson look like a couple, Jackson takes advantage of being Hannah's "boyfriend" for the perks; Oliver works on a school project with Sarah, and ends up liking her.
22	22	"We Are Family, Now Get Me Some Water!"	Roger S. Christiansen	Jay J. Demopoulos & Andrew Green	January 7, 2007	122	4.1
Miley accidentally gets Jackson fired from Rico's after harassing Rico to give Jackson a raise, so she hires her brother as Hannah's personal assistant, with disastrous results; Rico hires Oliver at his shop to replace Jackson.
23	23	"Schooly Bully"	Roger S. Christiansen	Douglas Lieblein & Heather Wordham	January 19, 2007	125	3.64
When a new bully at school causes problems for Miley and Lily, they turn to Roxy for help in dealing with the situation. Meanwhile, Robby and Jackson take a trip, but find themselves snowed in at a cabin with a creepy owner (Kenneth Mars) and his equally creepy ventriloquist dummy.
24	24	"The Idol Side of Me"	Fred Savage	Douglas Lieblein	February 9, 2007	117	3.7
Hannah participates in Singing with the Stars, a contest that consists of amateurs paired with celebrities. Miley gets Amber in the top three with the intention of humiliating her, but later regrets it. Jackson and Robby are annoyed by Dontzig's dog.
25	25	"Smells Like Teen Sellout"	Sheldon Epps	Heather Wordham	March 2, 2007	123	4.4
Hannah agrees to endorse a new fragrance, which smells like raspberries, but can't stand its smell because of a horrid childhood disaster where she threw up on the governor of Tennessee after winning a pie-eating contest in 1999; Jackson tries out for a television survival program with disastrous results.
26	26	"Bad Moose Rising"	Roger S. Christiansen	Steven James Meyer & Douglas Lieblein	March 30, 2007	121	3.1
Jackson arranges for Miley to learn what it's like to be the older sibling by having her babysit Dontzig's bratty niece until finding out her uncle was pretending to be sick. Elsewhere, Robby comes down with a very bad cold and Roxy arrives to help him get over it, albeit with some bizarre healing methods.
