= List of Hannah Montana characters =

The main characters of Hannah Montana (left to right): Rico Suave (Moises Arias), Jackson Stewart (Jason Earles), Robby Stewart (Billy Ray Cyrus), Miley Stewart as Hannah Montana (Miley Cyrus), Oliver Oken (Mitchel Musso) and Lilly Truscott (Emily Osment).

This list of Hannah Montana characters includes characters appearing in the Disney Channel series Hannah Montana as well as the related film Hannah Montana: The Movie. The characters listed are almost all fictional, except for stars who make guest appearances.

== Main ==
Character	Portrayed by	Hannah Montana				
Character	Portrayed by	Season 1	Season 2	The Movie	Season 3	Forever
Miley Stewart	Miley Cyrus	Main	Main	Main	Main	Main
Lilly Truscott	Emily Osment	Main	Main	Main	Main	Main
Oliver Oken	Mitchel Musso	Main	Main	Main	Main	Guest
Jackson Stewart	Jason Earles	Main	Main	Main	Main	Main
Robby Ray Stewart	Billy Ray Cyrus	Main	Main	Main	Main	Main
Rico Suave	Moises Arias	Recurring	Main	Main	Main	Main

=== Miley Stewart ===
Miley Ray Stewart (Miley Cyrus) is the teen main character of Hannah Montana. As her alter ego, Hannah Montana, she secretly lives a double life as a famous pop star. She’d rather be authentically Miley, no longer Hannah Montana. One of the concept names for her alter ego was Alexis Texas, but the writers learned there was an adult entertainer with the same name of Alexis Texas. Eventually the writers decided to use the real first name of the star, Miley Cyrus. Her best friends are Lilly and Oliver. Throughout the series she keeps her alias as Hannah Montana a secret from the world, but eventually tells several people throughout the show such as Lilly, Oliver, Siena, and Jesse. Her main love interest is Jesse, along with occasional crushes. She is known to say "Sweet niblets!" "Ya think?" and "Say what?" as her catch phrases.

Miley misses her mom very much and wishes she was still alive.

=== Robby Stewart ===
Robby Ray Stewart (Billy Ray Cyrus) is the widower father of Jackson and Miley Stewart. He is also Hannah Montana's manager, who was a former country singer. As Miley's father, he is also referred to as Hannah's father whenever they appear together publicly. Even though he wears a fake mustache and a hat as a disguise, he does not use a fake name. He takes pride in his hair and his shampoo collection. He is a loving and caring father but knows when serious discipline is necessary.

Billy Ray Cyrus auditioned for the part of Robby along with two other actors. He was only asked to audition after his daughter Miley had been given the lead role. After he was offered the role, Billy Ray at first had reservations about accepting it, saying "The last thing I would want to do is screw up Miley's show." Miley admitted that it was "weird" at first having her real-life father play the role of her television dad, but later described the situation as "really good." Cyrus provided much of the inspiration for the character, including their shared middle name, Ray.

=== Jackson Stewart ===
Jackson Rod Stewart (Jason Earles) is the older teenage brother of Miley Stewart and son of Robby Stewart. He is known for his goofy, lazy and disgusting habits. Jackson is a regular character in Hannah Montana. In the episode "He Could Be the One", Jackson does not take part in the actual story, but appears as a third-person omniscient narrator, though still appearing in character. Jackson also has a central role in the feature film Hannah Montana: The Movie.

Like the rest of his family, Jackson is from Tennessee. He moved to Malibu, California, with his father Robby and sister Miley after the death of his mother. In an off-handed remark in "Song Sung Bad," Jackson implausibly suggests the reason for this move involved an embarrassing incident with a Tennessean girlfriend. When Jackson first attended school in California, he was made fun of for wearing his accent, cowboy hat, boots, and large belt buckle with shining bright lights to school.

Jackson and Miley constantly bicker and compete for their father's approval. Miley often finds Jackson's antics disgusting and Jackson sometimes thinks that Miley is too full of herself. However, in private and when needed, both Miley and Jackson are able to express their love and appreciation for each other and maintain a healthy sibling relationship. Jackson even goes to great lengths to help Miley when she gets herself in serious trouble on several occasions. Jackson states that even though they prank each other, he would never bring it into the "Hannah World", meaning he would not go so far as damage her public image as Hannah Montana.

Despite being the first born, and therefore having high expectations from Robby, Jackson constantly lives under Miley's, or rather Hannah's, shadow. Unlike Robby, Lilly and Oliver, Jackson does not attend Hannah events in disguise. This is at first because he exploits his connection with Hannah to impress his dates. Later, in "My Boyfriend's Jackson and There's Gonna Be Trouble" a paparazzi photographer follows Miley and Jackson home from a concert and reports that they are dating. After this incident, Jackson publicly declares his love for Hannah is "like a sister," but still keeps her secret. In "We Are Family: Now Get Me Some Water!" he openly works as Hannah's "assisticant." He also sometimes works as her chauffeur. While working as Hannah's chauffeur, Jackson is sometimes forced to miss his own activities. He reveals in "Bad Moose Rising" that he really does not mind driving her, as long as she shows appreciation. After Miley gets her license in Season 3 this is no longer an issue.

Despite portraying a teen, Jason Earles was in his late twenties when the show began.

=== Lilly Truscott ===
Lillian "Lilly" Truscott (Emily Osment) is the best friend of Miley Stewart. She also becomes Oliver Oken's girlfriend in Season 3 and 4. When Miley is Hannah, Lilly is under the alias Lola Luftnagle, and also "Lola LaFonda." She is also close friends with Hannah Montana and part of her entourage. Lilly/Lola has a huge crush on Orlando Bloom in the episode "The Test of My Love" and tells Miley that she will see "the Lilly Bloom" when Orlando finally meets her. She also plays a central role in the film Hannah Montana: The Movie. The character was originally named Lilly Romero and then changed to Lilly Truscott. Miley Cyrus first auditioned for the role but was cast as the main character instead. Emily Osment auditioned for the role after Cyrus was cast.

Lilly was born in and grew up in California and was childhood friends with Oliver. She met Oliver in kindergarten and was best friends with him ever since. In "Judge Me Tender", she describes him as a dead beat when she first met him. She recently lived with her mother Heather Truscott (Heather Locklear) in Malibu. Heather appears in one episode, "Lilly's Mom Has Got It Goin' On," where she briefly dates Miley's father Robby. Lilly's parents are divorced, and her father is an accountant. In Season 1, Lilly claims to have a brother but this is contradicted by her in Season 3. In "Miley Get Your Gum", Lilly refers to her brother's pet hamster. However, in the episode "Would I Lie to You, Lilly?" Lilly says "Sometimes I wish I had a brother, then I come over here. All better!" In the Season 3 episode "The Wheel Near My Bed (Keeps on Turnin')," she moves in with the Stewarts' when her mother gets a job in Atlanta. But after she hears that Miley does not like her staying with them, she goes to stay at her dad Kenneth's (Jon Cryer) apartment only to find it even worse than the Stewart's house. Once Lilly and Miley make up, Lilly goes back to staying at the Stewart's house.

Lilly and Miley have been best friends since about the 6th grade. She discovers Miley's secret in the pilot episode, "Lilly, Do You Want to Know a Secret?" when she sneaks into Hannah's dressing room after a concert, and she sees the lucky bracelet that she had given Miley earlier in the episode. In order to help Miley keep her secret, Lilly attends all Hannah Montana events wearing a disguise and posing as Hannah's companion and assistant "Lola Luftnagle." Lilly first comes up with the name "Lola LaFonda" for her alter ego in the episode "Miley Get Your Gum", but she would later settle on Luftnagle in "It's My Party and I'll Lie If I Want To", which is used in all subsequent episodes. Lilly claims that Lola is the "daughter of oil baron Rudolph Luftnagle, [and] sister of socialites Bunny and Kiki Luftnagle." Another alter ego of Lilly's is Lola LaBamba, whose wig is turquoise.

Unlike Lilly, who wears a lot of hoodies, sneakers and athletic pants, Lola wears very tight clothes in loud colors. Emily Osment once said in a backstage interview that Lola has some very tight pants that are impossible to sit in. Lola wears a lot of jewelry like rings, necklaces, huge earrings and bangles. Lola usually wears a short, brightly colored wig, though the Season 3 wig is a bit longer than the wigs used in Season 1 and 2. In most episodes Lola wears a differently colored wig, from white to red to purple to pink to blue (in one episode Traci Van Horne refers to Lola as a "bitter anime character"). Emily Osment has said that she has around 80 wigs for Lola and that her personal favorites are the purple and white wigs. Lola is not dating Mike as said in "He Could Be the One". Instead, she is dating Justin Timberlake, according to an internet rumor she has "no idea" who started. Emily Osment said in a backstage interview that she is more like Lola than Lilly and that she loves Lola's clothes and wants to keep them. Lola did not appear in Hannah Montana: The Movie.

Although Lilly is dating Oliver, she looks at other guys. In "Once, Twice, Three Times Afraidy", she gazed at Tim, an old friend from camp, causing Oliver to point to the menu on the side, showing his muscles. Also, in "He Could Be the One", she gave advice to Miley stating, "whatever choice you make, it's gonna be okay... let's face it, they're both gorgeous!", making Oliver mad. However, other than calling other boys attractive, she never cheats on Oliver.

Lilly experiences a few short-lived dating relationships and only one serious one. She dates actor Jake Ryan (Cody Linley) at a 70s dance until Miley's jealously breaks them up, and her schoolmate Lucas (Sterling Knight) until Miley discovers he is a cheater.

Miley also has a dream in which Lilly starts dating Jackson and must learn to accept her friend for who she is. When Miley wakes up, she believes the dream was real and is pleasantly surprised when Lilly reacts with disgust.

In "You Are So Sue-able to Me", Lilly has a crush on her schoolmate Matt Marshall, but it is never revealed if they actually dated. After Matt asks Lilly to a dance, Miley tries to get Lilly to change her tomboy image so that Matt will find her more attractive. However, Matt gets turned off by Lilly's new look and stands her up. Lilly and Matt reconcile at the end of the episode after Miley was found liable for Lilly's suffering in the Teen Court. Lilly's celebrity crush is Orlando Bloom. Bloom is a recurring off-screen character in the show whom Lilly sometimes harasses at parties as Lola. She also has a crush on Justin Timberlake and supposedly spread a rumor that he is dating Lola.

In the Season 3 episode "Uptight (Oliver's Alright)", it is mentioned that Lilly had a crush on her French teacher during 7th grade. She wore a beret to school and said "Oui, Oui" so much that people started calling her "Tinkles Truscott".

Lilly starts her most significant and successful relationship when she started dating Oliver Oken in Season 3 of the series. Their friendship started in preschool when Lilly held his hand in order to share his crayons. "He had the 64-Pack with the sharpener!" Said Lilly. The two were best friends for years until one night after a beach party where they decided to date. At the time, Miley was away shooting her feature film Indiana Joannie, then later finds out in "What I Don't Like About You". However, after an argument over their favorite bands (Radiohead for Lilly and Coldplay for Oliver), they broke up. Miley made a mini-Indiana Joannie movie, and they made up and resumed dating. They attended prom together in "Promma Mia". In "He Could Be the One", Lilly says she loves Oliver. Their nicknames for each other are "Olly-pop" and "Lilly-pop." In "I Honestly Love You (No Not You)" Lilly tells Miley that Oliver calls her "Lilly-pop" because she had a pimple.

In "I Honestly Love You (No Not You)" a love triangle seemingly develop between the trio of friends when Miley (while asleep in the hospital because of a broken ankle) overhears Oliver say "I love you" to her while unconscious. This leads to Miley believe that Oliver is in love with her while dating Lilly. Miley thinks that all she has to do is wait until Lilly moves onto someone else, and that Oliver will change his mind. But when Lilly announces that she loves Oliver, Miley tells her the truth. Miley and Lilly then hatch a plan to get Oliver back only to find out that Oliver was in fact, practicing saying "I love you" so he could say it to Lilly. In the end of the episode, Lilly and Oliver both say that they love each other.

In "B-B-B-Bad to the Chrome," Lilly and Oliver celebrated their 100th day relationship anniversary which Oliver forgets at first and Lilly was upset. They make-up again after Rico helped them get back together by writing a fake poem and send it to Lilly but signed as "Oliver Oken."

In the episode "Judge Me Tender", Oliver's singing career takes off, but all the attention he receives causes him to neglect Lilly. As a result, Lilly asks Miley to boot him off the show which results in them breaking up. However, Miley lets Oliver succeed to the semi-finals. Afterward, Miley manages to talk some sense into Oliver, causing him to make up with Lilly.

When Lilly's mother moved to take a new job in Atlanta, Lilly was invited to live with the Stewarts when her father's place was too small to fit her, remaining with the Stewarts even after they moved back to Tennessee while maintaining a long-distance relationship with Oliver. After Miley ultimately revealed her secret during an interview with Jay Leno, Lilly got accepted at Stanford University. Although Miley was initially tempted by a movie deal, she ultimately chose to join Lilly at Stanford, noting that while she would have hundreds of such offers in future, she would only get one chance to go to college with her best friend.

=== Oliver Oken ===
Oliver Oscar Oken (Mitchel Musso) is the male best friend to Miley Stewart and Lilly Truscott. He later begins to date Lilly. He uses the alias Mike Standley III while attending events with Hannah Montana in order to keep Miley's secret. He often refers to himself in the third person as "Smokin' Oken".

Oliver was born July 3, 1992, and grew up in California and was childhood friends and Kindergarten friends with Lilly. In Judge Me Tender, Lilly describes him as a dead beat when she first met him. He met Miley in the 6th grade and has been her closest guy friend ever since. However, before he met her, he had spread a rumour that she ate possum. He lives with his mother Nancy Oken who works as a police officer, his overprotective father, and a little brother. Oliver also has type 1 diabetes.

Oliver is Jewish, as revealed in a few episodes. He says his family keeps Kosher, and says his mom goes Mashugana, "crazy" in Yiddish.

In the first two episodes, Oliver is an overly enthusiastic Hannah Montana fan, saying "Hannah Montana is a goddess! I worship at her feet!" He has a record of stalking her and even dreams of one day marrying her. Miley mercifully reveals her secret to Oliver in the second episode. Since he has never had any romantic feelings for Miley, Oliver is freed from his Hannah obsession, but remains close personal friends with Miley.

He makes a brief appearance in Hannah Montana: The Movie at Lilly's sweet 16th birthday party and in the credits doing the Hoedown Throwdown. He and Rico are the only main characters from the series to have small roles in the film. Oliver has a small role in the film because Mitchel Musso was working on his music career during the filming.

In the episode "Everybody Was Best-Friend Fighting," Oliver creates a disguise to attend Hannah events without blowing Miley's secret, similar to how Lilly created Lola Luftnagle. Lilly helps Oliver come up with the disguise which consists of a fake goatee, aviator sunglasses, an upside-down visor, white and blue shorts and a zip-up hoodie since he only had a vampire costume as a disguise, so Lilly helped him. When asked for his name, Oliver thinks of the name "Mike Standley III", being inspired by a nearby mic stand. Mike is not dating Lola, as said in "He Could Be the One".

Oliver has several dating relationships, but only two of them have been successful. He first dates Becca Weller whom Miley sets him up with after Becca confesses her feelings for Oliver to Hannah Montana in an email. (Becca was unaware that Hannah knew Oliver.) It is unknown how Oliver and Becca break up, but she only appears in one episode. Oliver later dates his classmate Sarah (Morgan York) with whom he is assigned a school project in which they must raise an imaginary child (a sack of flour). They break up after the project is due when they discover they have nothing in common, except their love for their imaginary flour child.

So far, Oliver's second longest relationship has been with Joannie Palumbo (Hayley Chase), whom he starts dating in "Joannie B. Goode." Miley and Lilly at first have a lot of animosity towards Joannie, but eventually Lilly becomes good friends with her and Miley accepts their relationship. Oliver and Joannie's relationship lasts for 11 more episodes until their amicable break up in "Papa's Got a Brand New Friend."

Oliver's most significant relationship and longest is with Lilly Truscott when they started dating in Season 3 of the series. In pre-school, Lilly held Oliver's hand for his crayons, with the reasoning, "He had the 64-pack with the sharpener!" For years, the two were best friends, but after a beach party they decided to start dating and we first see this in "What I Don't Like About You" while Miley was away shooting her feature film Indiana Joannie. However, after an argument over their favorite bands (Radiohead and Coldplay) they broke up but Miley made a mini-Indiana Joannie movie and they made up and resumed dating. They attended prom together in "Promma Mia". The circumstances of their first date are under dispute by both Lilly and Oliver.

In "He Could Be the One", Lilly says that she loves Oliver. Their names for each other are Ollie-pop and Lilly-pop.

In "I Honestly Love You (No Not You)" a love triangle appears when Miley (while asleep in the hospital because of a broken ankle), overhears Oliver say "I love you" while talking to Miley. This leads to Miley believing that Oliver was in love with her while dating Lilly. Miley thinks that all she has to do is wait till Lilly moves onto someone else and that Oliver will change his mind. But when Lilly announces that she loves Oliver, Miley tells her the truth. Miley and Lilly then hatch a plan to get Oliver back only to find out that Oliver was in fact, practicing saying "I love you" so he could say it to Lilly. In the end of episode Lilly and Oliver both say that they love each other. It is also mentioned in this episode that Lilly is the only girl he has ever loved.

In "B-B-B-Bad to the Chrome," Lilly and Oliver celebrated their 100th day relationship anniversary which Oliver forgets at first and Lilly was upset. They make-up again after Rico helped them get back together by writing a fake poem and send it to Lilly but signed as "Oliver Oken". It is also revealed in this episode that whenever he and Lilly are not together, he gets in a bad mood.

In the episode "Judge Me Tender," Oliver's singing career takes off, but all the attention he receives causes him to neglect Lilly. As a result, Lilly asks Miley to boot him off the show which results in them breaking up. However, Miley lets Oliver succeed to the semi-finals. Afterward, Miley manages to talk some sense into Oliver, causing him to make up with Lilly. In "Got to Get Her out of My House", Oliver and Lilly try to buy a car together. Also in the same episode, Rico insults Lilly and makes Oliver very angry to the point he tries to beat him up, much to Rico's delight. The final episode they say I love you to each other again and kiss. Oliver's celebrity crushes include Hannah Montana (until he finds out that Miley is Hannah), Mandy Moore, Jessica Simpson and Taylor Swift.

=== Rico Suave ===
Rico Suave (Moisés Arias) is the young manager of "Rico's Surf Shop", a concession stand located on the beach near the Stewarts' home. Rico's Surf Shop is known for being very organized, much more organized than Malibu and Seaview. He most commonly interacts with Jackson, his employee, despite the fact that Rico is several years younger. In Season 2 he also attends school with Miley, Lilly, and Oliver. Rico is the only main character unaware of Miley's double life.

Rico's first appearance is in "It's My Party and I'll Lie if I Want To", the fifth episode of Hannah Montana. He makes a total of five appearances in that season as a recurring character. His popularity led to his becoming a main character beginning with Season 2. Altogether, Rico has appeared in 58 episodes. He also makes a brief appearance in the film Hannah Montana: The Movie during Lilly's birthday party bash exploding through her cake. Although Rico does not know Miley's secret, he appears partly out of character in the episode "He Could Be the One" as an omniscient narrator who is aware of the secret. In this role Rico acts apart from the story. In the episode "Get Down Study-udy-udy", Rico had almost discovered Miley's secret according to the steps, the song used in the "Bone Dance" created by Miley and her voice. When Miley reveals herself on television as Hannah, Rico is shocked and horrified that he could not see the obvious, unable to talk to anyone afterward.

Rico comes from a very wealthy Latino family. His billionaire parents are often mentioned but never seen. He has a sister, a brother named Mateo (Mateo Arias), a cousin named Teresa, and an Australian/Mexican cousin nicknamed "Angus" whose real name is Alejandro Núñez González Umberto Sifuentes (Moisés Arias).

Jackson and Rico have a frenemy relationship. Rico often comes up with ways of making Jackson miserable or getting him in trouble. He is an unforgiving employer and sometimes fires Jackson, only to re-hire him later. Rico is usually successful in his practical jokes on Jackson because of his virtually unlimited financial resources. On a few rare occasions Jackson gets the last laugh with Rico, as seen in "Hannah In The Streets With Diamonds." (Rico called Jackson and his father "country dumpkins", and Jackson got angry.) In "Once, Twice, Three Times Afraidy" he tells Jackson that he is the closest thing to a best friend he has. In "Wherever I Go", Rico fires Jackson to force him to get a real job. After he fails, Rico gets him a real job as a video game tester saying (though it was hard for him) that Jackson is his best friend which Jackson reciprocates. When Miley reveals herself to be Hannah, Jackson at first gloats over Rico not knowing the secret but takes pity on him and cheers him up by having a choir sing of all the other people who did not figure it out.

The relationship Oliver and Rico have is practically the same as Jackson and Rico. Rico sometimes looks to Oliver as an older brother, but also as a target. He usually sees Oliver's complications and uses them against him, such as in "Don't Go Breaking My Tooth". He also takes heed in making fun and manipulating Jackson and Oliver, such as in "That's What Friends Are For?." When it comes to business matters, such as making a commercial for Rico's, he turns to Oliver. He also thinks of Oliver as a much more efficient employee than Jackson, as he once got a job and Rico said he was perfect. Oliver is also seen working at Rico's again in Season 3 in the episode "B-B-B-Bad To The Chrome" as well as in Season 1 in the episode "We Are Family – Now Get Me Some Water".

== Major recurring ==
=== Jake Ryan ===
"Dude, I slayed you once; don't make me slay you again!" Jake Ryan makes a dramatic introduction to his classmates in "New Kid in School".

Leslie "Jake" Ryan (portrayed by Cody Linley; seasons 1–4) is an Emmy-nominated television and film actor best known for his role as a zombie slayer on the teen sitcom Zombie High. He had an on/off relationship with Miley, something that was ongoing throughout much of the series.

Jake got his start in acting as a baby, appearing in commercials for "Wonder Diapers". He later got his big break in Zombie High (Buffy the Vampire Slayer parody) and went on to star in feature films such as Teen Bigfoot, Teen Gladiator and the Sword of Fire, and Roger Buck: Intergalactic Bounty Hunter (Buck Rogers parody). He claims that his box office appeal is just as big as Shia LaBeouf's. He also makes a brief appearance in the show Gotcha! (Candid Camera and Punk'd parody).

Jake first meets Miley at Seaview Middle School where he attends as a part-time learner before relocating. Jake's arrival at Seaview causes a big stir among the students who are all big fans of Zombie High and are starstruck at meeting him. Jake basks in the attention, although Miley, who is a superstar herself, fails to be impressed at his star power and believes that Jake should be treated as a normal kid. This is what first attracts Jake to Miley, and with time, Miley begins to realize that she has feelings for him too, even though she refused to admit it at first.

Throughout the course of Jake and Miley's relationship, the series explored one of its central themes – the ups and downs of celebrity life. Jake served as Miley's foil and represented the over-exposed lifestyle she is trying to avoid. While Jake often enjoys the benefits of being famous, he also admits to Miley "sometimes I wish I could just turn it off".

Jake and Miley first start dating in "People Who Use People", but their relationship lasts only a matter of minutes as Jake kisses Miley and then tells her he is going away to Romania for four months. (While he is there, it is extended to six months.) He returns in "Achy Jakey Heart" where Miley decides to forgive Jake and they restart their relationship. Jake reveals his real name 'Leslie' to Miley as his biggest secret and says that he is glad that they do not have to keep any more secrets from each other. Guilt eats Miley up, as she, too, has a secret, until she finally reveals to him that she is Hannah Montana. Their relationship, however, comes to an end again after Miley decides that Jake is too self-centered, and they agree to be just friends.

In "That's What Friends Are For?", Miley realizes that she is not over Jake, as she feels jealous about him spending time with Mikayla. Jake again returns in "Jake... Another Little Piece of My Heart" where it is revealed that both Jake and Miley still love each other but will not admit it. The relationship is on again for the third time in "He Could Be the One". Robby seems to have second thoughts about Jake because he has broken Miley's heart multiple times, but nevertheless he is supportive of the relationship.

In the Season 4 episode "It's the End of Jake As We Know It" Oliver gets a picture text to his phone of Jake cheating on Miley, so Miley confronts Jake during the taping of a Christmas special with guest star Sheryl Crow. This leads to their relationship ending for good.

=== Roxy Roker ===
Roxy Roker (portrayed by Frances Callier; seasons 1–2) is Miley's ex-bodyguard who took her job too seriously and known for her ridiculous attempts to keep Miley “safe” from danger, resulting her being permanently fired by the Stewarts. She despises the Stewart family.

Roxy used to be a Marine where she learned most of her techniques. She was also a bodyguard for the famous cellist Yo-Yo Ma. She later worked as a security guard, and while on duty at a place called "Wig City", she met Miley and Robby for the first time. Miley was trying to create the Hannah disguise, and Roxy helped her pick an appropriate wig. She then took a job as her bodyguard temporarily and got permanently fired. She now permanently works for the Secret Service presidential protection unit after saving the president from contaminated sushi. After this she no returned to work for Hannah. Roxy also has 60 hours of firefighter training.

Roxy's catchphrases are "Roxy like a Puma!" and "I got my eyes on you!" Among her special abilities are dicing a pineapple with a karate chop, crushing a baseball into fine powder, and squeezing through air ducts. Roxy owns a pair of bulletproof pantyhose, which she says, "keeps bullets out; keeps Roxy in".

Roxy is single and lives in an apartment with her dog named Diddy. She earlier had a goldfish named Denzel. The only time Roxy is seen to be intimidated was upon meeting an old high school friend, Clarice Johnson. Roxy was insecure about her life, but later learned that she did not need to be.

Roxy appears in "It's a Mannequin's World", "On the Road Again", "Schooly Bully", "Bad Moose Rising", "Take This Job and Love It", "When You Wish You Were the Star", "I Want You to Want Me... to Go to Florida", and "We're All On This Date Together." She no longer returns.

The character's name sounds identical to, but is spelled differently than, that of actress Roxie Roker, best known for The Jeffersons.

=== Amber and Ashley ===
Amber Addison (portrayed by Shanica Knowles) and Ashley Dewitt (portrayed by Anna Maria Perez de Tagle; both seasons 1–4) are extremely mean and snobby girls who are Miley and Lilly's classmates and bitter rivals. They are typical school divas, aka the mean girls, very popular among their peers and spoiled by their parents' money. Amber and Ashley are ironically both big Hannah Montana fans, despite their disdain for Miley. The girls first appear in the pilot episode and have since appeared in a total of 21 episodes. In the series finale, they now attend Stanford along with Miley and Lily and they like them now that they know that Miley is Hannah Montana.

Amber seems to be the more competent of the duo with Ashley typically following her lead. Amber is the editor of the school yearbook, a great singer, and is the first in the class to hold a valid driver's license. Amber also does better in school, as it is revealed that Ashley often cheats off her test papers. They both try out for the cheerleading squad but get turned down. Ashley claims it is because she is "too pretty".

They are antagonistic towards Miley and Lilly, banishing them to the "losers' table" at lunch and placing them at the bottom of the "cool list", their annual listing of their classmates by their perceived coolness. In "The Idol Side of Me", Miley conspires with Lilly to embarrass Amber on live television with Lilly's "Green Gas" science project, thinking she deserves it. Miley (as Hannah) has her first honest conversation with Amber backstage and learns that when she was younger, Amber was bullied and made fun of. Miley begins to feel sorry for her and makes her promise to become a kinder person. In spite of this, Amber only fulfills her promise to a small extent and her bitterness towards Miley and superficial ways remain. In "Achey Jakey Heart", Amber and Ashley try to become Miley and Lilly's friends after Miley starts dating Jake Ryan. This gives Miley a small taste of why she maintains her Hannah secret, as Amber and Ashley only want to be her friend for selfish reasons. When Lily and Miley get into Stanford University, they become assigned dormmates to Amber and Ashley. The duo now want to be friends again for selfish reasons, as Miley's secret has been revealed.

Whenever Amber and Ashley happen to say something at the same time, they say together "Oooo, tsss!" and touch index fingers. This celebratory gesture becomes their trademark and a source of great annoyance to Miley and Lilly. At the end of the pilot episode, Miley and Lilly do the gesture in mockery of Amber and Ashley. Miley later initiates it with Lilly, but she refuses, and Miley says that they do a different handshake. In "It's a Mannequin's World", Roxy initiates the gesture with Robby, but passes on it because "he doesn't do that".

Amber and Ashley appear in "Lilly, Do You Want to Know a Secret?", "It's a Mannequin's World", "Mascot Love", "Ooh Ooh Itchy Woman", "New Kid in School", "Good Golly, Miss Dolly", "Money for Nothing, Guilt for Free", "The Idol Side of Me", "You Are So Sue-able to Me", "Achey Jakey Heart Part One", "When You Wish You Were the Star", "Song Sung Bad", "No Sugar, Sugar" (unaired), "Uptight (Oliver's Alright)", "Ready, Set, Don't Drive" and "Wherever I Go".

=== Traci van Horn ===
Traci van Horn (portrayed by Romi Dames; seasons 1–3) is a socialite and friend of Hannah Montana. Her record producer is her father and Miley counts his self-centered daughter, Traci as a close friend of Hannah's. Traci has had a frequent dislike for Hannah's friend, Lola, claiming that she is "so uncool". She has however, reluctantly accepted Lola at social events and maintains a friendly relationship with Hannah because of this. Traci talks with a nasal voice that is often noticed by others, which she claims is a "deviated septum" or else a "nasal condition". She and Jake Ryan prank Hannah on a reality TV show called Gotcha!, in which they make Hannah believe that the two are getting married. Hannah once went to Traci for boyfriend help when she asked to use her "faux-beau" to fool Lilly and Oliver (who believe that Miley is alone now that the two are dating). She seems to have a crush on Jackson, and is frequently having celebrity parties, in which Hannah and her friends go to (although Lilly only goes for the publicity).

Traci appears in "It's My Party and I'll Lie If I Want To", "Torn Between Two Hannahs", "My Boyfriend's Jackson and There's Gonna Be Trouble", "Cuffs Will Keep Us Together", "When You Wish You Were the Star", "Don't Stop 'Til You Get the Phone", "The Test of My Love", "Uptight (Oliver's Alright)", "Once, Twice, Three Times Afraidy", "Jake... Another Little Piece of My Heart", and "For (Give) a Little Bit".

=== Cooper ===
Cooper Montgomery (portrayed by André Jamal Kinney; season 1), also called "Coop", is Jackson's best friend in Season 1. Cooper has not made an appearance outside of season 1, although he is mentioned, and it is assumed they still hang out. Cooper often plays the straight man to Jackson's antics. He works at a movie theater called "Nick's Fat City". He enjoys Shirley Temple cocktails, calling them "fruity and refreshing". He also has a secret love of baking, something he keeps secret because he believes it is a primarily female activity.

Cooper has a little sister named Olivia (Rae'Ven Larrymore Kelly) who is a student on the East Coast. In "I Can't Make You Love Hannah if You Don't", Olivia visits Malibu on break where she meets Jackson. She agrees to go out with Jackson. Cooper gets mad at Jackson for flirting with his sister then he learns Olivia is Cooper's sister and she acts innocent. The incident causes a temporary rift in Jackson and Cooper's friendship. They are good friends again after Cooper realizes that everything was Olivia's fault.

Cooper appears in "Miley Get Your Gum", "She's a Supersneak", "I Can't Make You Love Hannah If You Don't", "It's a Mannequin's World", "Oops I Meddled Again", and "Money for Nothing, Guilt for Free". Cooper is mentioned but unseen in the episodes "My Boyfriend's Jackson and There's Gonna Be Trouble" and "Bad Moose Rising" where he and Jackson have plans to go to a Los Angeles Dodgers game. In "You Give Lunch a Bad Name" Jackson says he had to miss Coop's party because Mamaw came to visit.

=== Dontzig ===
Albert Dontzig (portrayed by Peter Allen Vogt and Paul C. Vogt; seasons 1 and 3) is the Stewarts' wealthy, snobby, pretentious, obese, and obnoxious next-door neighbor who has an ongoing rivalry with both Robby and Jackson.

He can't stand the Stewarts, saying "I hate neighbors! That's why I have the big hedge!" He complains of leaves from their tree falling into his outdoor hot tub and makes fun of Jackson's new used car. His wife once had a car similar to Jackson's but traded it in because she thought it was too "girly". Mr. Dontzig tricks the Stewarts into a competition to see who can make their house look the scariest for Halloween, while all he wanted to do was attract more children to his house. This plan of course, backfires on him. He takes advantage of the Stewarts' generosity by faking a sickness to have them watch his bratty eight-year-old niece "Patty" (Savannah Stehlin). Patty becomes the center of a bet between Jackson and Miley in "Bad Moose Rising".

Dontzig is an alumnus of the (fictional) State University of Santa Barbara and is a generous donor to the school. To write a letter of recommendation to the school in support of Jackson's matriculating, Dontzig has Jackson perform menial favors for him.

Dontzig is the only character in Hannah Montana to be portrayed by two separate actors. Paul C. Vogt debuted the role in "Miley Get Your Gum", and his identical twin brother, Peter Allen Vogt, has performed the role ever since in the episodes "Torn Between Two Hannahs", "The Idol Side of Me", "Bad Moose Rising", and "Killing Me Softly with His Height". Paul returned in the episode "Killing Me Softly with His Height" in the role of Dontzig's sister, "Donna", who is a huge Robbie Ray fan. Dontzig also has a cousin named "Francesca" (Lisa Rinna) who is also a Robbie Ray fan.

=== Susan Stewart ===
Susan B. Stewart (portrayed by Brooke Shields; seasons 2–3) was Robby's wife and Miley and Jackson's mother. Susan is the daughter of Grandma Ruby. She died three years prior to Season 1 but is often mentioned by the Stewarts and appears in household pictures. She also appears in person in three episodes by way of old home videos and various dream sequences. These are "I Am Hannah, Hear Me Croak", "The Way We Almost Weren't", and "He Could Be the One". She is alive and stays permanently in all of Miley’s dreams, Jackson’s dreams and Robby Ray’s dreams.

Although they were both from Tennessee, Robby and Susan first met on the West Coast in a small roadside cafe off Interstate 10. Susan was working as a waitress at the cafe during her college days and Robby visited while driving home to Nashville. Robby claimed he fell in love with Susan immediately, and that he knew that Susan loved him too because she laughed at all his jokes. However, when Robby first asked Susan out she turned him down because she was already dating someone else. But with a little encouragement from Aunt Dolly, Robby persisted, and Susan finally went out with him. Robby tells Oliver that he first got Susan to go out with him by using the line "My Robby name is hi'."

Susan was a loving and supportive parent, but she was stricter than Robby and wouldn't let the children have sugar before bed because it gave them nightmares, as seen in "I Am Hannah, Hear Me Croak". She was a skilled shopper and Miley remembers that she had great taste in fashion. Robby remembers that when he and Susan went shopping, all he did was carry the bags.

Susan died at age 34, when Miley was 10 of a terminal illness. The family's dealing with her death is first explored in the episode "She's a Supersneak" in which Miley overreacts to Robby dating another woman. Miley dreams about reuniting with her in "I Am Hannah, Hear Me Croak" because she is afraid she will lose her singing voice. Susan comforts Miley and teaches her that even if she can't be Hannah Montana anymore, just being Miley is still "pretty darn terrific". In "He Could Be the One", Robby shares a pre-recorded video of Susan, who had anticipated a future personal struggle Miley would have. In the video Susan tells Miley to always pray to God. In "Super (stitious) Girl", it is learned that Susan gave Miley a special ankle charm bracelet which says "Dream". Miley wears this bracelet in all of her Hannah concerts until it is thrown overboard the SS Tipton by London Tipton, who was disgusted when Miley told her that her diamonds were fake. Miley was devastated, but someone rescued the anklet and gives it back to Miley.

Robby admits that he misses Susan, and when she died, he didn't think he could raise the kids by himself, but he found the strength by feeling her presence with him. In "What I Don't Like About You", Jackson plans to lie to a college recruiter in order to be accepted into college. Robby is disappointed, but rather than stopping him, he points to a picture of Susan and says that she would not be proud of him. The so-called "Mom card" works in making Jackson finally tell the truth. In the pilot episode, Robby tells Miley that Susan would have been proud of her performance at the Los Angeles concert.

=== Siena ===
Siena (portrayed by Tammin Sursok; season 4) is Jackson's long-term girlfriend. She works a job as a bikini model. She lives next door to the Stewarts and has a cousin named TJ. Every time Jackson talks about her, he always stutters saying the word "bikini." In "Sweet Home Hannah Montana", Siena and Jackson start out as being friends, but throughout the season, Siena shows to have true feelings for Jackson and cares for him for who he is. In "Hannah Montana to the Principal's Office," she shows to have an immediate interest in Jackson and asks him out, even admitting to him that boys have always asked her out before, but that was the first time she herself had to ask. In "California Screamin'," Jackson admits to Siena that even though he wants to be more than just friends with her, he still feels insecure because he is not like the other guys she dates. Siena admits to Jackson that he is right, because he is "way better," and they share their first kiss. In "De-De-De-Do, Da-Don't-Don't-Don't Tell My Secret," while visiting Jackson, she mistakenly thinks Jackson is cheating on her with Hannah Montana after seeing Miley outside in her Hannah disguise through the kitchen window. In the end, to save their relationship, Miley shows Siena her closet. This results in Siena finding out that Miley is really Hannah. She later visits Jackson at his new job as a video game tester and comments on his and Miley's relationship. In the Season 4 she appeared in 8 out of 13 episodes.

=== Jesse ===
Jesse (portrayed by Drew Roy; seasons 3–4) is Hannah/Miley's romance interest. In "He Could Be The One," Miley repeatedly tries but fails to tell her dad that she's dating Jake Ryan again. Soon, Robby winds up believing that she is hiding something from him. To make her father thankful for Jesse, she pretends to like her bad boy bandmate Jesse, but gets in over her head when she starts to have feelings for him so it is up to Robby to help Miley pray to God. and chose the guy who could "be the one." In the end, Hannah tells Jake that he is not the one for her, and there is just something between her and Jesse that is special and picks Jesse after some help from a video of her mother. In "Been Here All Along", Jesse starts seeing Miley and Miley cancels a special father-daughter afternoon with her dad to go on a first date with Jesse instead. After Jesse receives a phone call from his deployed father, their heartfelt conversation leads Miley to realize how blessed she is to have her father close to home whenever she needs him. Then, in "I'll Always Remember You", it is revealed that Jesse knew that Miley was Hannah when he told Miley that his dad was in Afghanistan. Jesse ends up figuring out that Miley is Hannah before she could even tell him, claiming that "You both have the same beautiful eyes and amazing smile." Things go from bad to worse when Jesse kisses Hannah on stage and is soon criticized for two-timing Hannah when he is spotted with Miley, this is the moment that the Hannah-secret started interfering with Miley's personal life to the point which it became too difficult to manage, and it served as the instigator to Miley revealing the secret to the world. Jesse later goes to see Miley off at the airport and they (presumably) kiss.

== Family members ==
=== Stewart family ===
Aunt Dolly (left) and Mamaw (right) smother Miley in a hug after putting their 30-year feud behind them.

- 'Mamaw' Ruthie Ray Stewart (Vicki Lawrence) is Miley and Jackson's paternal grandmother and Robby's mother ("Mamaw" is a nickname given to a grandmother). She lives in Tennessee but occasionally visits California. Ruthie is a rude, demanding and opinionated woman, often seen nagging Robby about his habits and parenting skills. Ruthie also makes fun of him for being fat. No longer tolerating his mother’s attitude and behavior, Robby Ray becomes more assertive with her. While in high school Ruthie dated fellow Tennessean Elvis Presley and claimed to have been the one to first give him the nickname "The King" after playing checkers with him. Elvis eventually started dating Aunt Dolly which began a 30-year feud between the two women. A former Olympian who played volleyball at the 1964 Olympics, Ruthie maintained her competitive streak throughout life: From 1982 to 1999, she won "Lunch Lady of the Year" from the North Central Nashville School District every single year and in "Grandmas Don't Let Your Babies Grow Up to Play Favorites" she was seen competing with Queen Elizabeth II in an arcade dance-game. Both Miley and Jackson love "Mamaw," but they find her too overbearing. Ruthie alienates poor Miley in "Grandmas Don't Let Your Babies Grow Up to Play Favorites" by clearly showing favoritism toward Jackson. Ruthie feels that because of all Miley's success, Jackson is often overlooked in the family, not realizing she is overlooking Miley's feelings on purpose as well. Ruthie reconciles with Miley and teaches her to better appreciate her brother. Then Ruthie promises to be a better grandmother. In the episode "B-B-B-Bad to the Chrome", Ruthie is seen to have a battered old car called Loretta (a 1980s Cadillac Eldorado convertible). Loretta has 40 years of smells including her husband's hair tonic and tomato sauce in between the seats. Ruthie has appeared once in Season 1, 2, and 4, and twice in the third. The episodes include: "Grandmas Don't Let Your Babies Grow Up to Play Favorites," "I Will Always Loathe You," "You Give Lunch a Bad Name," "B-B-B-Bad to the Chrome", and "I Am Mamaw, Hear Me Roar!"
- "Bubba" Joe Stewart was Ruthie's husband and Robby's father. Very little is said about him except that he had large ears and that he and Ruthie started dating after a school dance. He is presumably deceased as the family refers to him in the past tense
- Grandma Ruby (Margo Martindale) is Jackson and Miley's maternal grandmother, Robby's mother-in-law, and Susan's mother. She lives in Crowley Corners, Tennessee. She is rarely mentioned in the series, although Robby says that she goes to singles bingo. In Hannah Montana: The Movie, Ruby's birthday is Robby's excuse for taking the family back to Tennessee for two weeks. Ruby helps teach Miley the value of family and staying true to oneself
- Aunt Dolly (Dolly Parton) is a long-time friend of the Stewart family, long enough to remember when Robby was in diapers. Although not a blood relation, the Stewarts consider her a family member as she is Miley Stewart's godmother. Miley is seen to rely on her advice and encouragement. Dolly is also partly responsible for Miley's parents getting married. She lives in Nashville, Tennessee, with her husband and dog Rufus. She has appeared in two episodes: "Good Golly, Miss Dolly" and "I Will Always Loathe You" in which she visits California. The character is primarily based on Parton herself who is the real-life godmother of Miley Cyrus. It is unclear if, like Dolly Parton, Aunt Dolly has a career in music; although she does mention that she used to perform on stage, and she was a go-to person for Miley when she was considering becoming a professional singer and, in "I Will Always Loathe You", Ruthie tells Dolly she "put the 'old' in Grand Ole Opry". She returned for the episode, "Kiss It All Goodbye". Her 30-year feud with Mamaw Ruthie Ray Stewart is due to both having dated Elvis Presley
- Uncle Earl (David Koechner) is one of Robby's brothers from Tennessee. Earl seems to have provided the family with endless stories and jokes, often at his own expense. Most of the stories about Uncle Earl concern his being overweight, lazy, smelly, or his fun-loving, childlike personality. For example, Uncle Earl once drilled for oil and accidentally hit a sewage pipe; Uncle Earl once tried to box a kangaroo and got knocked out cold; Uncle Earl once found a week-old sardine in his fat fold when he was looking for the remote; Uncle Earl once fell off a horse and it took four people to help him up; and Uncle Earl once chased a rolling quarter through a car wash and it was the cleanest he ever was in his life. It is learned that Earl enjoys watching football and playing poker, and he is a huge fan of Shakira. Robby says that Earl is one of the all-time great pranksters. He once went to college, but only stayed for four days. Earl is an unseen character for much of the series, but finally makes an appearance in the second-season episode "(We're So Sorry) Uncle Earl." It is revealed that Earl's lifelong ambition is to be a rock star, and he hopes that Miley will be able to help him achieve that goal. Miley learns in a dream sequence that the table with the brightly colored mannequin legs, often seen in the Stewarts' kitchen, was bought by Robby at one of Uncle Earl's garage sales
- Aunt Pearl is Earl's wife. In a similar manner to Earl, she has provided the family with endless stories and jokes. Unlike Earl, who did eventually appear, Aunt Pearl has remained completely unseen on screen, making her the longest-running unseen character in the show whose voice has not been heard
- Luann Stewart (Miley Cyrus) is Miley's identical cousin who visits from Tennessee in the episode "Torn Between Two Hannahs." She looks very similar to Miley, except that she wears overalls, braids her hair, and speaks in a more exaggerated southern accent. Miley is convinced that Luann is evil, although Robby doesn't believe it. Miley claims that Luann pushed her down a well when she was six years old; Robby thinks that Luann is nice because she pulled Miley back out. Luann causes Miley trouble by dressing up as Hannah Montana and threatening to reveal her secret. Oliver and Luann are attracted to each other, but they never date. Throughout the episode, Miley makes several witch-related comments about Luann in keeping with the episode's Halloween theme
- Bobby Ray Stewart (Billy Ray Cyrus) is Robby's identical twin brother and Luann's father. Like his daughter, Bobby has an exaggerated southern accent

=== Truscott family ===
- Kenneth "Ken" Truscott (Jon Cryer) is an accountant. He first appears in Season 3 in the episode "The Wheel Near My Bed (Keeps On Turnin')" and reappears in Season 4 in the episode "I Am Mamaw, Hear Me Roar!". In "It's a Mannequin's World," Lilly complains that he got her a savings bond for her birthday, seen by Lilly as worthless because she can't spend it. Although he is separated from Lilly's mother, he is known to spend time with Lilly and keep her accountable for her schoolwork. Lilly says that he likes bran muffins and is susceptible to back injuries. He lives an hour away from Lilly. He has his own business but he fakes that he's successful and has an assistant called Margaret. He is lactose intolerant, but still eats ice cream, revealed in "It's the End of Jake As We Know It."
- Heather Truscott (Heather Locklear) is Lilly's mother. She first appears at a PTA meeting at the Stewarts' home in "Lilly's Mom Has Got It Goin' On." She goes on a date with Robby, but things turn cold when she refuses to let Robby pay for her meal. Miley describes Heather as "uptight," and Lilly eventually agrees with her. She reconciles with Robby, but they are no longer seen dating. Heather gets a job in Atlanta forcing Lilly to move. She attends a Hannah concert dressed as Lola Luftnagle's mother. She is divorced from Lilly's father. Earlier Heather bought Lilly a pair of horn-rimmed glasses which Lilly is embarrassed to wear.
- Lilly's brother is first mentioned in the episode "Miley Get Your Gum" but Lilly later wishes that she has a brother in "Would I Lie to You, Lilly?". He had a pet hamster (who is later seen under the ownership of Lilly). Other than him, no other siblings are mentioned. Most likely Lilly's brother disappeared like the Chuck Cunningham Syndrome and Lilly is an only child.
- Lilly's grandfather got run over by a school bus. In the episode "Good Golly, Miss Dolly", Lilly says that Principal Fisher reminds her of him.
- Lilly's other grandparents smell like oatmeal and Lilly says that her dad uses the puppy dog look to make her shampoo Grandma.

=== Oken family ===
- Nancy Oken is Oliver's mother. Although unseen, Nancy is often portrayed as having exaggerated masculine characteristics. She is sometimes heard off screen using her "man voice" when she's angry. When Oliver's pet fish died, she flushed it down the toilet. She works as a police officer, then got promoted to detective and earlier had a job as a security officer. She makes homemade fried chicken.
- Mr. Oken is very over-protective and still holds Oliver's hand in parking lots.
- Oliver's brother loves to go to Mozzarella Mousie's and Make A Moose.
- Aunt Harriet is Oliver's aunt. She is the reason for Oliver's fear of chewing gum; when he was a baby, Aunt Harriet was playing with Oliver when the piece of gum that she was chewing fell on him. She is seen in the episode "Miley Get Your Gum".

=== Suave family ===
- Rico Suave Sr. is Rico's father and owner of Rico's post.
- Mrs. Suave is Rico's mother, who was heard in the episode "Ready, Set, Don't Drive".
- Mateo Suave (Mateo Arias) is Rico's younger brother.
- Rico's sister is Rico's older sister. She flirted with Jackson, but he is distracted by the fact that she is Rico's sister.
- Teresa is Rico's cousin. She goes out on a date with Jackson, but he is distracted again by the fact that she is Rico's cousin.
- Alejandro Nuñez Gonzales Umberto Sifuentes, a.k.a. "Angus" (Moises Arias) Rico's Australian/Mexican cousin. Rico thinks that he is more good-looking than him even though the two could be twins.

== Supporting characters ==
=== School staff ===
- Francis Corelli (Greg Baker) is a teacher of Miley, Lilly and Oliver. He is sometimes weird. He often teaches in an exaggerated fashion, by trying to be the "cool teacher", but he is the cool and fun teacher. He is usually star struck when he meets a celebrity like Jake or Hannah Montana. Even though he is unaware that Miley is Hannah Montana. It is later revealed that he lives in his mom's basement. He was Hannah's private tutor in the episode "When You Wish You Were the Star"
- Karen Kunkle (Erin Matthews) is a teacher of Miley, Lilly, Oliver, Jackson and Rico. She is very strict and rude to Miley and Jackson. In an attempt to get good grades, Jackson sets his father up on a date with Karen Kunkle but fails when his father has an argument with her over his cooking ingredients. She revealed to Miley that she is from Detroit, and that she doesn't find her country sayings charming, but she was impressed with her "Bone Dance" she did during her Biology Test, calling it "The Best Study Technique she has ever seen".
- Lori (Christine Taylor) is a nurse at Seaview High School whom Robby Ray is dating. Miley first overhears her phone-conversation with her mother (continuously trying to set her up with dates in order to get discounts) and sets her up with Robby Ray. She only appears in three episodes. Very kind and motherly, she bonds with Jackson and Miley. She get’s fired.

=== Students ===
- Sarah (Morgan York), sometimes called "Saint" Sarah by Lilly, is Miley's classmate who represents a typical nerd girl. She is an environmentalist, a supporter of animal rights, and especially concerned about the poor and needy. Her interest in causes is something she evidently inherited from her parents who met at a blood drive and honeymooned while volunteering for the Peace Corps. Sarah gets up every day at 4 a.m., except for Saturdays, when she sleeps in to 5:30 a.m. She owns only two pairs of socks, thinking that having anymore would be extravagant. She once worked for Rico at the surf shop and had her father Woody (Ed Begley Jr.) provide electric power by riding an exercise bike. Sarah is very polite and kind but can also be quite assertive when she needs to. She briefly dated Oliver after they worked on a school project together, but she broke up with him because they had nothing to talk about. She also dated Jackson very briefly after a misunderstanding. Sarah's trademark is saying something very unpleasant, and then saying a cheery "Bye!" and walking away. Sarah also hyperventilates whenever she is in Hannah Montana's presence, apparently unable to pronounce her name. This has now occurred on two occasions, "Money for Nothing, Guilt for Free" in Season 1 and "Hannah Montana to the Principal's Office" in Season 4. So far, Sarah has appeared in "Money for Nothing, Guilt for Free", "My Boyfriend's Jackson and There's Gonna Be Trouble", "The Idol Side of Me", "Cuffs Will Keep Us Together", "You Are So Sue-able to Me", "Song Sung Bad", "Lilly's Mom Has Got It Goin' On", "Would I Lie to You, Lilly?", "Sweet Home Hannah Montana", "Hannah Montana to the Principal's Office" and "Love That Let's Go". It is revealed that her and Joannie's parents are dating.
- Joannie Palumbo (Hayley Chase) is Lilly's rival since the second grade. When they were young, Joannie used to bully Lilly, cutting her kite loose and popping her balloon. Lilly has been trying to beat Joannie at something since the second grade. She is a vegetarian. In "Joannie B. Goode", Joannie starts to date Oliver much to Lilly and Miley's dismay. However, after a sleepover, Lilly and Joannie learn that they have a lot in common and they become friends, driving Miley to become more competitive. Joannie and Oliver continue to date for 11 more episodes until their breakup in "Papa's Got a Brand New Friend". In "Sweet Home Hannah Montana", it is shown that Joannie also became friends with Miley. So far, Joannie appeared in "Cuffs Will Keep Us Together", "Joannie B. Goode", "Don't Go Breaking My Tooth", "Papa's Got a Brand New Friend", "Sweet Home Hannah Montana" and "Hannah Montana to the Principal's Office". It is revealed in ''Joannie B. Goode'' that she is not a fan of Hannah Montana and actually dislikes her music (to Miley's dismay), though she quickly changes her mind in ''Hannah Montana to the Principle's Office'' when Hannah accidentally called her by her first name before being formally introduced, with Joannie claiming ''Her starpower cut right through my macho facade''. It is said that Joannie's parents and Sarah's parents are dating, so it is possible that they may have become stepsisters after the show had ended.
- Thor (Andrew Caldwell) is from fictional Mooville, Minnesota. He first appeared in "Me and Rico Down by the School Yard", as the new kid at Seaview High. Thor became acquainted with Jackson on the first day of school, to which Thor quickly labeled him as his new best friend, much to Jackson's annoyance. Later, Jackson remembered what it was like for him to be the new kid that everyone thought was a loser and stuck up for Thor when he was being ridiculed by the other students. Thor usually comes off as being very friendly and has been known to be totally oblivious to when people make fun of him, or when he is found annoying to others. Thor was also seen in "You Are So Sue-able to Me" and "Get Down and Study-udy-udy". Thor is mentioned in "You Gotta Not Fight for Your Right to Party" in which he lends Jackson his pickup truck.
- Max (Teo Olivares) tells Thor that Jackson is the welcoming committee and that California girls like guys who churn their own butter. Jackson invites Max to his party. Max says girls are saying hi to him just because he knows him. Max's girlfriend is a stereotypical nerd and is in the chess club at school. Max appears in "Me and Rico Down by the School Yard" and "Sleepwalk This Way". In "Welcome to the Bungle", Jackson says that Max's parents have extra Laker tickets. He and Jackson play basketball. Miley gives Max $20 to tell Lilly she has the ugliest ears in Seaview High history and a squeaky voice in "What I Don't Like About You". He's normally seen hanging out at the beach.
- Johnny Collins (Corbin Bleu) is Miley's schoolmate who appears in the pilot episode. Miley has a huge crush on him but is afraid to speak to him. Johnny is a fan of Hannah Montana and gets her autograph after her Los Angeles concert. He asks her to sign it to Johnny, claiming that Johnny is his little brother. Johnny is not seen again until close to the end of Season 2 in "We're All On This Date Together". His two-year absence was the result of going to school in Arizona which is reference to Bleu's role as Chad Danforth in High School Musical, which is actually set in Albuquerque, New Mexico. Rico calls Johnny "Poodle Dude", referencing his curly afro. He apparently comes from a rich family as he buys a dinner date with Hannah Montana for $19,000 at a charity auction.
- Chad (Kyle Kaplan) is a schoolmate of Miley, Lilly and Oliver. In "Miley Get Your Gum", Oliver has a feud with Chad which starts with Chad sticking his used gum onto Oliver's "Hannah hand". Later, when Chad's locker is stuck, Oliver refuses to help him open it. Chad later sticks another piece of used gum on a picture of Hannah in Oliver's locker. Chad makes a speaking cameo in "Mascot Love" where he complains that Pirate Pete is blocking his view of the cheerleaders.
- Gabe Lamotti (Chris Zylka), called "Hottie Lamotti with the Swimmer's Body", is a student at Seaview High, who all the girls constantly fawn over. Sarah goes with him to the dance. He asks Miley out but Jackson blocks him.
- Todd (Patrick Ryan Anderson) is one of Lilly's guy friends from high school. He doesn't recognize Lilly after she changes her look. He asks Lilly to the dance, but she already had plans to go with Matt. He and Lilly also spend time surfing. Todd is the first person to taste the "Cheese Jerky" and realize how delicious it is, foreshadowing its possible commercial success. He appears in "You Didn't Say It Was Your Birthday" where he enthusiastically bids on the likeness of Darth Vader which Lilly and Oliver discovered in a bag of chips. (This was a parody of the Virgin Mary grilled cheese sandwich.)
- "Dandruff" Danny (Jack Taylor) is a classmate of Miley's who has excessive dandruff. He is bullied by the Cracker. Danny appears in "Good Golly, Miss Dolly", "School Bully", "New Kid At School" and "The Idol Side of Me".

=== Other characters ===
- Blue Jeans is Miley's horse. His first appearance was in Hannah Montana: The Movie. In "Miley Says Goodbye?", Miley brings him to Malibu. It is possible that the Hannah-song "Old Blue Jeans" is a reference to him, as Miley recalled in "Love That Let's Go" how she named him because he was tugging on her old blue jeans.
- Mikayla (Selena Gomez) is a rival teen pop star who is very similar to Hannah. Mikayla appears in three episodes in Season 2 of the show "I Want You to Want Me... to Go to Florida", "That's What Friends Are For?", and "(We're So Sorry) Uncle Earl". In the episode "I Want You to Want Me... to Go to Florida" Mikayla lands an appearance on Colin Lassiter's talk show (along with Hannah) thanks to her first top 10 hit "If Cupid Had a Heart". While on air the two girls share kind and supportive words however after cutting to commercials, Mikayla bluntly informs Hannah that she despises her, starting a rivalry between the girls. While on a commercial break Mikayla informs Hannah that she will steal all of her fans at an upcoming benefit concert in Florida due to her being more talented than her. Miley is enthusiastic about going to Florida, confident that she will show Mikayla up, however she is told that she cannot go by Robbie Ray when he gets injured. Mikayla finds out that Hannah has pulled out of the concert and accuses her of being afraid to perform. Angered, Miley tells Mikayla that she actually will be performing at the concert. In the episode "That's What Friends Are For?" Hannah and Mikayla appear again with Lassiter for a telethon fundraiser where they trade insults. Later in the same episode Mikayla is revealed to make her acting debut in the film "Roger Bucks: Intergalactic Bounty Hunter" where she stars as love interest "Alien Babe" opposite to fellow teen actor Jake Ryan. While promoting/filming the movie Mikayla exchanges kind words with Miley (unaware that she is Hannah Montana) and expresses to her that she has feelings for Miley's ex-boyfriend Jake Ryan. Miley eventually becomes jealous and attempts to get Mikayla fired from the movie to keep her away from Jake. Her plan is ultimately unsuccessful, but Mikayla forgives Miley and says she would like to still be friends with her. In the episode "(We're So Sorry) Uncle Earl" Mikayla makes a cameo appearance when her music is panned by critic Barney Bittman (Gilbert Gottfried) who calls her a "teen poop sensation," and says "If Mikayla had a heart, she'd stop singing!"
- Little girl (Noah Cyrus) is a recurring character who make brief appearances in Season 1, 2, and 4. She portrays a mean and weird little girl in seven episodes so far. It is assumed that she knows Hannah's secret because she is in the ball pit when Hannah and Lola switch wigs in "Money for Nothing, Guilt for Free". It is revealed that her soccer mom has a taser, and that she was able to climb a rope when she was four, mocking Miley because she is afraid.
- Liposuction Liza (Lisa Arch) is Hannah's former assistant. She is mostly known for her photography and advertisement career, getting Hannah to promote zit cream and perfume in a couple of episodes in Season 1. She returns in Season 3 to take pictures of Jackson and Oliver for her online dating ad, in which the two portray average, unattractive guys that women would not want to date. She seems to have a one-sided crush on Robby.
- Colin Lasseter (Michael Kagan) is a talk show host. He is often blunt, asks very un-maneuverable questions, overly dramatic, but also is friendly throughout his six episode appearances in Season 1–4. Considering that he was the first to interview Hannah, and that he created a bond with her long before her secret came out, he was initially upset at Miley for doing her "big reveal" on rival talk show host Jay Leno's show, and then an in-depth interview with news anchor Robin Roberts, leaving him last in line with her interview (groaning while calling himself Colin "Last In Line" Lasseter). Miley's ditching of the famous blonde wig caused many angry parents to call in and complain about her actions in "killing-off Hannah", much in the same way fans of the series responded negatively towards Miley Cyrus' more provocative image at the time.
- Wendy (Sandy Brown) is the over-enthusiastic host of the "Wake-up it's Wendy Show". She first interviewed Hannah in the wake of "Jacksannah" in "My Boyfriend's Jackson and There's Gonna be Trouble", where Hannah "broke up" with Jackson. She appeared again in "That's What Friends Are For" when interviewing Jake Ryan and Mikayla on their up-and-coming movie. She told Jake it takes her a while to shake-off her over-enthusiastic persona after finishing an interview.
- Mack and Mickey (Terry Rhoads and Leigh-Allyn Baker respectively) are 2 quirky talk show hosts that first appeared in Miley's dream in "He Ain't A Hottie, He's My Brother". Mack is portrayed as the egocentric and slightly dimwitted male counterpart to Mickey. In "Welcome To The Bungle" it is revealed that Mickey is pregnant, this is due to Baker's real-life pregnancy at the time, which resulted in her being cast as Amy Duncan in the fellow Disney Channel Sitcom Good Luck Charlie.
- Byron and Andy (Charles Shaughnessy and John Henton) are 2 of Hannah's co-judges on the talent show "America's Top Talent" (a parody of America's Got Talent and American Idol). Byron is a parody of Simon Cowell and Andy is a parody of Randy Jackson. Real-life American Idol judge Kara DioGuardi portrayed herself alongside Byron and Andy in "Judge Me Tender".

== Minor ==
- Rachel (Summer Bishil) is Miley and Jake's classmate from Spanish class. She and Jake Ryan start dating in "Good Golly, Miss Dolly," a fact that Miley learns just after working up the courage to tell Jake her feelings for him. In "People Who Use People", it is said that Jake broke up with Rachel
- Lucas (Sterling Knight) boyfriend of Lilly in the episode "My Best Friend's Boyfriend". Miley finds out he is cheating on Lilly in the same episode and then Lilly breaks up with him
- Henrietta Laverne (Jaelin Palmer) also known as "The Cracker" appears in "Schooly Bully". She bullies Dandruff Danny, then starts to bully Miley. Miley and Lilly hear rumor that she was kicked out of her old school and they get scared. Miley asks Roxy for help, but she refuses so Miley tries to scare The Cracker off with fake martial arts skills, which does not work. In the end, Miley and Lilly conduct a plan for the principal to catch The Cracker, and it worked, which turned out to be Roxy using reverse psychology. It is also assumed that she bullies people because she was bullied because of her name
- Guillermo Montoya (Michael Steger) is, in Oliver's opinion, the greatest tennis player in the world. He appears backstage at a Hannah concert where he meets Hannah, Lola, and for the first time, Mike Standley. He is a fierce competitor and claims to never lose. He plays in the United People's Relief Celebrity Pro-Am tournament, and picks Hannah as his celebrity partner after Kelly Clarkson has to drop out
- Joey Vitolo (Joey Fatone) is a retired Major League Baseball player and was the first player to hit five home runs in his first five at bats. His career was abruptly ended after he injured his shoulder doing a celebratory cartwheel on his last home run. After leaving baseball, he owns and operates "Vitolo's", an Italian restaurant in Pasadena. He tends to shy away from fans, possibly from the ill treatment he has received by sportscasters after his retirement. It is also revealed that he has an ambition of becoming a pop star. He performs with Hannah at "Vitolo's". His daughter, Angela Vitolo (Juliette Goglia), is a huge fan of Hannah Montana
- Cindy Merriweather (Edie McClurg) is the puppeteer of Pancake Buffalo (actually performed by Victor Yerrid, voiced by Susie Geiser), the puppet star of a long running children's television program. Pancake is a purple buffalo puppet and has a large number of loyal fans, known as "Buffalo Buddies." Merriweather pretends that Pancake is real. She has a weakness for Swiss truffles
- Isis (Rachel York) is a famous pop star who has dominated the charts for 20 years. Both Miley and Lilly have been fans of Isis since they were young. Hannah and Lola meet Isis in "Yet Another Side of Me" where she makes Hannah question her career. Isis is based on the real-life pop star Madonna. Both are named after revered maternal figures (Isis and the Madonna) and both are known for regularly changing their image. Isis' songs "Immaterial Girl" and "Impress Yourself" reference Madonna's songs "Material Girl" and "Express Yourself" In later airings and the Disney+, Isis was renamed Ice via audio editing to dissociate from the extremist organization of the same name.
- Austin Rain (Mark Hapka) is a young country rocker who collaborates with Hannah for the successful duet "Us Isn't Us Without You." Austin and Hannah's publicists have them fake date in public, but they both secretly hate each other. Hannah comes clean about the relationship live on The Real Deal with Colin Lassiter, his real name is Albert Niedermayer
- Evan (Kunal Sharma) is Traci's boyfriend in "It's My Party and I'll Lie If I Want To". Traci mentioned having an ex-boyfriend in "Once, Twice, Three Times Afraidy"
- Holly (Josie Lopez) is an actress who appeared in a commercial for a toe fungus treatment. She stars alongside Jake Ryan in a film and they fake date to increase publicity
- Marissa Hughes (Nicole Anderson) is an actress who stars in Teen Gladiators and the Sword of Fire with Jake Ryan. According to Jake, he and Marissa pretend to be dating to increase interest in the film, similarly to how he had earlier dated Holly. On Jake and Marissa's fake date, he says Miley's name rather than Marissa's
- Alison (Katerina Graham) is Jackson's on and off-again girlfriend. She appeared in episodes, "No Sugar, Sugar (cancelled)", "Jake... Another Little Piece of My Heart" and "Uptight (Oliver's Alright)." She was last seen when she dumped Jackson after he got a good mark on a test because of her
- Heather (Gina DeVivo) is a skateboard competitor. She has beaten Lilly multiple times in an annual competition and enjoys taunting Lilly about it. Her sidekick friend is Kim (Destiny Edmond)

== Crossover characters ==
Hannah Montana is set in the same universe of other Disney Channel shows, among them The Suite Life of Zack & Cody & The Suite Life on Deck, and Cory in the House, with characters from these shows appearing in Hannah Montana in special crossover episodes.

- Maddie Fitzpatrick (Ashley Tisdale), a character originating in The Suite Life of Zack & Cody, is an employee of Boston's Tipton Hotel and a big fan of Hannah Montana. Maddie appears in "On the Road Again?" in which she meets Hannah and Robby while they visit the Tipton on tour. Hannah says that Maddie is a friend of hers, presumably from when they met in the Suite Life episode "The That's So Suite Life Of Hannah Montana." Hannah gave Maddie tickets to her concert. Maddie's mother, Margie Fitzpatrick, is a fan of Robbie Ray. Maddie is starstruck when she meets him. She later appears in San Diego to see Robbie Ray's comeback performance but arrives too late to see the show. She is nonetheless excited to see that they have not left yet
- President Richard Martinez (John D'Aquino) is the President of the United States. Hannah performs a concert for him and his family. The character originated in Cory in the House. The president embarrasses his daughter by trying to act cool in front of Hannah Montana. Roxy saves him from contaminated sushi, and he immediately asks her to work for the Secret Service
- Sophie Martinez (Madison Pettis) is President Martinez's seven-year-old daughter, also originating in Cory in the House. Sophie is an enthusiastic Hannah Montana fan and is excited when she gets to meet her. She later dresses up like Hannah, and Lilly dresses up like Hannah in order to cover for Miley while she goes to look for Roxy. Sophie is unconvinced that Lilly is Hannah because she has no talent
- Agent Kaplan (Laird Macintosh) is a childish Secret Service agent who is assigned to protect President Martinez and Sophie. He seems to enjoy playing with dolls and is excited about going to the "Make-A-Moose" store. He does not appear on Cory in the House, yet appears in the crossover episode "Take This Job and Love It"
- Marion Moseby from The Suite Life on Deck appears in the episode "Super(stitious) Girl" as part of the Wizards on Deck with Hannah Montana crossover event. Mr. Moseby spends most of the time trying to make Hannah's stay on the SS Tipton comfortable by keeping her away from crazed fans. Miley appears solely as Hannah in the whole crossover event
- Lydia is a maid on board the S.S. Tipton who finds Miley's charm anklet
- London Tipton (Brenda Song) is bitter at Hannah that she will not record the theme song for Yay Me Starring London Tipton. She finds Hannah's anklet and accidentally drops it overboard in disgust after learning the diamonds are synthetic imitations. Hannah apparently performed at one of London's birthday parties, but she was never paid, and is still owed
- Zack Martin (Dylan Sprouse) spots Hannah on the S.S. Tipton and tries to impress her by getting dessert for her
- Cody Martin (Cole Sprouse) and Bailey Pickett (Debby Ryan) appear as a couple in "Super(stitious) Girl." Hannah gives them tickets to her concert in Hawaii, as well as to the afterparty. Hannah met Cody years earlier, in "The That's So Suite Life Of Hannah Montana," though she was only able to recognize Cody (mistaking him for Zack) in Wizards on Deck with Hannah Montana when he had cake on his shirt. (This was because in "That's So Suite Life Of Hannah Montana" she ate cake off Zack's shirt)

== Real-life characters ==
=== Real-life celebrities portrayed by themselves ===
- Larry David was the first celebrity to guest star as himself. He appeared in "My Best Friend's Boyfriend" along with his daughters Cazzie and Romy David. The Davids wait over an hour to be seated at a restaurant. In order to get seated faster, Larry tells the maître d' (Jorge Luis Abreu) it is Romy's birthday, and then Cazzie's birthday. When Hannah arrives at the restaurant she is seated immediately, prompting Romy to say "face it dad, she's bigger than you." Cazzie then remarks if "Uncle Jerry" can let them in, much to Larry's chagrin. This scene is a reference to the popular Seinfeld episode "The Chinese Restaurant"
- Jesse McCartney attends a Hannah Montana concert in "When You Wish You Were the Star." He later invites Hannah to come with him and some friends to "The Dragon Room" (a reference to "The Viper Room"), but Hannah is unable to go because Miley is too busy. This leads her to make the wish that she was Hannah all the time, thinking that life would be much easier. After making her wish, Jesse McCartney is her hopelessly infatuated boyfriend. He even buys her a private island called "Papoey.". He also guest starred as himself in an episode of The Suite Life of Zack & Cody, as a guest of the Tipton Hotel
- The Jonas Brothers (Kevin, Joe, and Nick Jonas) appear in "Me and Mr. Jonas and Mr. Jonas and Mr. Jonas" Hannah and Robbie Ray first meet the Jonas Brothers at the recording studios. Robby develops a friendship with the boys and writes the song "We Got the Party" for them. Robby seems to have so much fun hanging out with the Jonas Brothers, that Miley becomes jealous and tries to discredit his songwriting in front of the Jonas Brothers. Hannah later collaborates with the band in a rendition of "We Got the Party"
- Dwayne "The Rock" Johnson comes to town for his new film in "Don't Stop Till You Get the Phone." Johnson falls victim to Miley's plot to get an embarrassing picture of him – something Miley does to keep a picture of Hannah being published that could reveal her secret. Miley and Lilly masquerade as complimentary hotel beauticians, visiting Johnson at his room and tricking him into getting a makeover. The plan works perfectly, although Miley immediately feels guilty about the plan and offers the picture back to Johnson. The girls wind up befriending him and he helps Miley get the Hannah picture back from the publisher
- Donny Osmond appears at a charity auction for beach conservation in "We're All On This Date Together." Osmond serves as the auctioneer, credited as himself
- John Cena appears on "Love That Let's Go." Jackson flips to a page in a wrestling magazine with John Cena, with the top of the page reading, "Grrrrr...." on it. When he moves and says, "What are you looking at me for, you troglodite?" Cena walks up to him from behind and touches him. Jackson steps away and Cena tells him to read the book (not the magazine). Jackson replies, "But reading hurts," so Cena picks him up and slams him. Then, he locks him up in a submission, uses the Attitude Adjustment on him, does his signature "You Can't See Me" and uses the Five Knuckle Shuffle. At the point of Jackson almost getting hit, he wakes up
- Ray Romano, the star of the TV show Everybody Loves Raymond, appears in "We're All On This Date Together." A round of golf with Romano is being offered at a charity auction which is eventually sold to Oliver for $11. Oliver winds up going with Lilly instead because Romano is too embarrassed that nobody knows who he is and that he only went for $11 (out of pity)
- Rob Reiner, one of the top film directors in Hollywood, directs the feature film Indiana Joannie and the Curse of the Golden Cobra (a parody of the Indiana Jones film series) which stars Chace Crawford and Hannah Montana. Hannah at first desperately wants the part, but later tries to lose the job in order to impress Oliver. Hannah acts like a diva in front of Riener who assumes that she is trying to impress him with her acting skills. Hannah proves that she is not acting by dumping a cup of ice water down Reiner's shirt
- Nancy O'Dell appears as herself in "Cheat It." She interviews Hannah and Austin Rain on the red carpet at the 15th annual Teen Scene Awards
- David Archuleta comes to California in "Promma Mia" in order to do some recording. He asks Hannah to record a duet with him ("I Wanna Know You") and she accepts, while at the same time going back on her promise to attend prom with her schoolmate Aaron. While recording the song, Archuleta gives Hannah a rose which reminds her of Aaron. She then decides not to break her promise, says a quick goodbye to Archuleta, and leaves the studio before finishing the song
- Sheryl Crow appears as herself in Season 4 and sings a duet with Hannah called "Need a Little Love"
- Iyaz appears as himself in Season 4 "Hannah's Gonna Get This" and sings a duet with Hannah called "Gonna Get This" after her failure to make her fans like her new song
- Jay Leno appears as himself

==== Hannah Montana: The Movie ====
- Tyra Banks fights with Hannah over a pair of shoes that are on sale. The "shoe fight" incident leads Robby to think that Miley may be letting her Hannah personality take her over completely
- Steve Rushton performs at Lilly's 16th birthday party in Hannah Montana: The Movie
- The band Rascal Flatts are seen in Tennessee, performing at Grandma Ruby's birthday party
- Marcel sings with Robby at the barn party in Crowley Corners
- Taylor Swift is also seen performing at the barn party. Oliver is a fan of Taylor Swift. Lilly tricks Oliver into bringing him to Miley's house by blindfolding him and telling him they are going to Taylor Swift's house. Later Oliver tries to come up with an understatement by saying "Taylor Swift is a little bit cute."
- Bucky Covington also appears in Hannah Montana: The Movie
- Colton Dixon and Schyler Dixon of American Idol fame appear as extras in the ending carnival scene

=== Real-life characters portrayed by others ===
- Don Sundquist, the Governor of Tennessee was at the October 1999 County Fair to award six-year-old Miley Ray Stewart the prize for winning the raspberry pie eating competition. Miley recalls throwing up on the governor, ruining his suit. Ever since Miley has been disgusted by raspberries.
- Orlando Bloom is seen briefly in "Test of My Love," running away from Lola at a Putt-putt golf charity event. Bloom is often mentioned in the series as Lilly's long-time celebrity crush. He is also mentioned in the series' theme song "The Best of Both Worlds".
- Arnold Schwarzenegger (Lyndall Grant), the Governor of California, appears in "Ready, Set, Don't Drive." Schwarzenegger is in line at the Department of Motor Vehicles just in front of Miley and Lilly. He is denied his appointment by arriving two minutes late, and this helps Miley realize how strict the DMV is. Just before leaving, Schwarzenegger utters the famous line "I'll be back!", referencing his role in the film The Terminator.
- Barack Obama (Reggie Brown), the President of the United States of America, appears in "Hannah Montana to the Principal's Office". President Obama comes to the Stewart's Ranch, after Miley makes a call to him to get her registered at her high school. He appears to be aware of Miley's double-life, as well as other secrets about Lilly and Robby.
- Queen Elizabeth II (Helen Duffy), the Queen of the United Kingdom, visits California and Hannah and Robby perform for her. Because the Queen is late, Hannah speeds the tempo of the song and abbreviates the lyrics so that she can still attend Jackson's championship volleyball game. The Queen is attended by her humorless servant Simon Tisdale (Patrick Kerr) who briefs Hannah on Royal etiquette. The Queen is later seen, possibly in an apocryphal throwaway joke, visiting the Stewarts' home and playing a dancing video game (similar to Dance Dance Revolution) with Mamaw. In "Test of My Love," Trey's parents invite Miley to a gala with Queen Elizabeth and Miley admits that she has already met the Queen, almost blowing her Hannah secret.
- Ozzy Osbourne (Jason Earles) Though this was not a fictional portrayal, Jackson impersonated Osbourne at a Hannah concert in order to lure Hannah's critic Barney Bitman away from the concert.

== Characters from Hannah Montana: The Movie ==
- Travis Brody (Lucas Till) is Miley's love interest in Hannah Montana: The Movie and comes from Crowley Corners in Tennessee. He was a childhood friend of Miley's and doesn't know her secret. When the towns people were angry about a mall being built, he suggests that Miley gets Hannah to perform a concert to support the town. When he finds out her secret, he is upset that he was lied to, but learns to forgive her when she reveals her secret to the crowd at the concert. Their relationship doesn't last into the TV series, as Miley ends up with Jesse.
- Vita (Vanessa Williams) is Hannah's publicist and only appears in Hannah Montana: The Movie. She was not happy when she got into a fight with Tyra Banks over shoes, and later appears near the end of the film, to help keep Miley's secret under wraps.
- Oswald Granger (Peter Gunn) is the main antagonist of the film. He is a paparazzo who tries to discover Miley's secret after overhearing her confess it to Lilly. He follows her to Crowley Corners, on a tip given to him by Lilly. When he snaps a picture of Lilly dressed as Hannah, and thus keeps a low profile in the movie. When Miley decides to confess her secret to the people of Crowley Corners, Oswald snaps a picture and is chased down and cornered. He threatens to send the pictures to his editor but is convinced by his own daughters not to spoil the secret, and quits his job.
- Lorelai (Melora Hardin) is Robby Ray's love interest in Hannah Montana: The Movie. She is connected to the mayor as she was able to set up a meeting with him.
- Mr. Bradley (Barry Bostwick) is a land developer who plans on building a mall on the fields of Crowley Corners, much to the townspeople's objection, because of the loss of open land. He seems pretty set on his goal as he taunts the town by telling them they won't stop him. Travis convinces Miley to invite Hannah to support their town. After the concert at the end of the movie the mall development doesn't pull through.
- Lucinda (Jane Parr) is the editor of BonChic, a British Magazine and Oswald's boss. She has a goal to find out Hannah Montana's secret and expose it to the world, and has Oswald follow her to Crowley Corners, often giving him phone-calls to get his job done. When Oswald decides not to expose Miley/Hannah's secret, he calls her and quits, calling Lucinda out for making others miserable. Miley does not interact with Lucinda throughout the film.
