= Sharon Jordan =

American actress

- Occupation: Actress
- Years active: 2006–present
- Website: www.sharon-jordan.com

Sharon Jordan is an American actress. One of her notable roles is Irene the concierge in the Disney Channel sitcom The Suite Life of Zack & Cody. Jordan also appeared as Irene in That's So Suite Life of Hannah Montana, the first Disney crossover special with the three shows, The Suite Life of Zack & Cody, Hannah Montana, and That's So Raven. In addition, Jordan has co-starred on several independent films including Day in the Life of Doe, Rift, I.D., Dead End Falls, Blind, and Some Sunny Day.

Jordan's recurring guest star roles on the Disney Channel are significant, and previous actors in her position have consequently been offered a bevy of big screen offers. Better known on the stage than the screen, her range as an actress has been displayed by a large array of roles, which include murderous characters in Agatha Christie plays and romantic leads in Greek comedies.

For several years, Jordan performed onstage in Welcome Home, Soldier, one of the longest-running plays in Los Angeles, California. It is a production of the Playhouse West Repertory Theater group and was written by Tony Savant and directed by Robert Carnegie.

== Personal life ==
Jordan attended Riverside Polytechnic High School and graduated in the summer of 1977; her graduating class was 1978.

== Writing ==
Jordan has published numerous poems in magazines and journals as well as a mystery and suspense novel, Time Shadows, which is the Book One in the trilogy The Shadow Chronicles. Currently Jordan is editing the print galley for Death Shadows, the second book in The Shadow Chronicles series. Jordan was also named author of the month for Red & Proud.

== Filmography ==
Film
Year	Film	Role
2006	Southland Tales	Uncredited, Secretary
2006	Pirates of the Caribbean: Dead Man's Chest	Uncredited, Port Royal Woman
2007	Fracture	Uncredited, Secretary
2008	Some Sunny Day	Lucy Holliday
2009	Id	Nurse
2009	Dead End Falls	Nurse
2009	Billy and the Hurricane	Ellen
2010	Casting Shadows	Natalie
2011	Shades of Gray	Paula Burton
2011	Blind	Mother
2011	The Afterlife	Mother
2011	Rift	Nurse Debra
2011	Busy Doing Nothing	Catherine
2011	Day in the Life of Doe	Ortal Zarnaby
2013	23 Hours	Detective Larson
2013	Dying to See You	Victoria
2015	Askew Circus	Detective Larson
Filming	Hello Au Revoir	Suzanne Jones
Filming	Crooked Transit (filming)	Karen Suave
Pre-Production	Guiso (pre-production)	Samantha
Television
Year	Show	Role
2006–2007	Sons & Daughters	Uncredited, Waitress 2 episodes
2006	Huff	Uncredited, Phylliss Sams
2007	Hannah Montana	Irene the Concierge
2005–2008	The Suite Life of Zack & Cody	Irene the Concierge, recurring
2008–2011	I Didn't Know I Was Pregnant	EMT, recurring guest star
2009–2011	Oblivion: The Series	Twiggy Fan/Barbara, recurring
2012	Cost of Capital	Susan, recurring
2014	Roomers	Kate, recurring
