= Lilly, Do You Want to Know a Secret? =

- Hannah Montana episode
- Episode no.: Season 1 Episode 1
- Directed by: Lee Shallat Chemel
- Written by: Steven Peterman; Gary Dontzig; Michael Poryes
- Production code: 101
- Original air date: March 24, 2006

Guest appearances
- Corbin Bleu; Shanica Knowles; Anna Maria Perez de Taglé; Matt Winston

Episode chronology
← Previous —	Next → "Miley Get Your Gum"

"Lilly, Do You Want to Know a Secret?" is the first episode of the Disney Channel sitcom series Hannah Montana. It was written by Gary Dontzig, Steven Peterman, and Michael Poryes. It originally aired on March 24, 2006. The episode title is a reference to The Beatles song "Do You Want to Know a Secret".

== Plot ==
The episode starts with teen pop sensation Hannah Montana — who is actually Miley Stewart (Miley Cyrus) — and her father Robby Ray Stewart (Billy Ray Cyrus) singing the song "This Is the Life" in preparation for a sold-out concert in Los Angeles the next day. After she reluctantly gives her older brother Jackson (Jason Earles) two tickets for him and a girl he is trying to ask out to the concert, Miley's best friend, Lilly (Emily Osment), who is unaware of her dual identity and a big fan of Hannah, calls to announce that she is "incoming in 20 seconds". Miley takes her Hannah wig off and puts a blue jacket over her Hannah clothes. Lilly enters on a skateboard and says she has two tickets for herself and Miley to the concert. As Miley is Hannah, she has to decline, and to protect her secret, she says she wants to spend quality time with her brother (hoping Lilly will believe her). Lilly tries to force her to come but Miley doesn't agree. Miley's other best friend, Oliver Oken (Mitchel Musso) has a crush on Hannah Montana (before he knew she was Miley) and somewhat stalks her. Before the episode ends, Lilly finds out Miley is Hannah and keeps her secret. It is in the following episode, "Miley Get Your Gum," that we learn Hannah Montana has already been around for 2 years when we are first introduced to her. Oliver says, "Well, there goes 2 years of my life," when Miley shows that she's really Hannah Montana.

== Starring ==
- Miley Cyrus as Miley Stewart/Hannah Montana
- Emily Osment as Lilly Truscott
- Mitchel Musso as Oliver Oken
- Jason Earles as Jackson Stewart
- Billy Ray Cyrus as Robby Stewart

== Guest starring ==
- Corbin Bleu as Johnny Collins
- Shanica Knowles as Amber Addison
- Anna Maria Perez de Tagle as Ashley DeWitt
- Matt Winston as Fermine
- Derek Basco as an MTB host

== Cultural references ==
Every Hannah Montana episode title references a song; "Lilly, Do You Want to Know a Secret?" is a play on the title of The Beatles song "Do You Want to Know a Secret?". Jackson's line of "When you got it, flaunt it" references a song from the musical, The Producers.

== Production ==
Cyrus received the script for the pilot, before then auditioning for Hannah Montana for 6–7 months, changing her father's plans to produce an album, tour, and retire. Creators Poryes, Rich Correll and Barry O'Brien looked in Los Angeles and New York for someone to play Hannah, but couldn't find anyone. Cyrus sent in an audition tape, but while the creators were impressed, they were not convinced, leery of putting the show in the hands of a 12-year-old with no acting experience. As they looked fruitlessly for an actor to portray Hannah for one year, they decided to look at Cyrus again. The decision was between her and a 16-year-old with much sitcom experience. The room was evenly split on who should play Hannah, and Marsh made the decision to go with Cyrus.

Garry Marsh's exact quote was "We pride ourselves not just on creating great television, but on creating stars; not just on launching careers, but on launching franchises for the entire Walt Disney Company. So, after consulting with everyone involved, I'm ready to pull the trigger on Miley." On the day the pilot was shot, the show was to star a girl named Chloe. According to Billy Ray Cyrus, when the writers heard him calling his daughter Miley, who at that time was still called Destiny, they changed their minds and said "Everything Chloe is Miley."

== Promotion and reception ==
The Disney Channel used three Hannah Montana music videos to promote the series in the weeks leading up to its debut. The music videos used were "Best of Both Worlds", "Who Said" and "This is the Life".

David Cornelius of DVDTalk.com felt that "Lilly, Do You Want to Know a Secret?" was awkward and that it overused musical interludes, due to it being the pilot episode. An ultimatedisney.com review felt that the pilot was "coincidence-riddled." "Lilly, Do You Want to Know a Secret?" had the highest-rated series premiere on a kids network in seven years, scoring 5.4 million viewers. It was also the highest ratings ever for a Disney Channel series.
