= That's So Suite Life of Hannah Montana =

Crossover episode of three Disney Channel series

- Disney Channel crossover event
- DVD cover

Part 1: That's So Raven
- Episode title: "Checkin' Out"
- Episode no.: Season 4 Episode 11
- Directed by: Rich Correll
- Story by: Michael Carrington
- Teleplay by: Edward C. Evans & Al Sonja L. Rice
- Production code: 422
- Original air date: July 28, 2006

Episode chronology
← Previous "Sister Act"	Next → "Fur Better or Worse"
- That's So Raven season 4

Part 2: The Suite Life of Zack & Cody
- Episode title: "That's So Suite Life of Hannah Montana"
- Episode no.: Season 2 Episode 20
- Directed by: Rich Correll
- Written by: Howard Nemetz
- Production code: 218
- Original air date: July 28, 2006

Episode chronology
← Previous "Ask Zack"	Next → "What the Hey?"
- The Suite Life of Zack & Cody season 2

Part 3: Hannah Montana
- Episode title: "On the Road Again"
- Episode no.: Season 1 Episode 12
- Directed by: Roger S. Christiansen
- Written by: Steven James Meyer
- Production code: 112
- Original air date: July 28, 2006

Episode chronology
← Previous "Oops! I Meddled Again!"	Next → "You're So Vain, You Probably Think This Zit is About You"
- Hannah Montana season 1

Crossover chronology
- Followed by: Wish Gone Amiss Weekend

"That's So Suite Life of Hannah Montana" is a crossover episode of the Disney Channel sitcoms That's So Raven, The Suite Life of Zack & Cody, and Hannah Montana. In the United States, it aired on July 28, 2006 as a three-part special and served as a TV movie. The three episodes of the crossover were watched by 5.7–7.1 million viewers.

== Cast and characters ==
=== "Checkin' Out" ===
- Raven-Symoné as Raven Baxter
- Orlando Brown as Eddie Thomas
- Kyle Massey as Cory Baxter
- Anneliese van der Pol as Chelsea Daniels
- Rondell Sheridan as Victor Baxter
- Cole Sprouse as Cody Martin
- Dylan Sprouse as Zack Martin
- Phill Lewis as Mr. Moseby
- Anne-Marie Johnson as Donna Cabonna
- Bobb'e J. Thompson as Stanley
- Jasmine Guy as Pistáche
- Annie Wood as Kandra Blair
- Tiffany Thornton as Tyler Sparks
- Malik Yoba as Judge

=== "That's So Suite Life of Hannah Montana" ===
- Cole Sprouse as Cody Martin
- Dylan Sprouse as Zack Martin
- Brenda Song as London Tipton
- Ashley Tisdale as Maddie Fitzpatrick
- Phill Lewis as Mr. Moseby
- Kim Rhodes as Carey Martin
- Raven-Symoné as Raven Baxter
- Miley Cyrus as Miley Stewart/Hannah Montana
- Brian Stepanek as Arwin Q. Hawkhauser
- Sharon Jordan as Irene the Concierge
- Adrian R'Mante as Esteban Ramirez

=== "On the Road Again" ===
- Miley Cyrus as Miley Stewart/Hannah Montana
- Emily Osment as Lilly Truscott
- Mitchel Musso as Oliver Oken
- Jason Earles as Jackson Stewart
- Billy Ray Cyrus as Robby Stewart
- Ashley Tisdale as Maddie Fitzpatrick
- Frances Callier as Roxy
- Richard Portnow as Marty Klein

== Plot ==
=== "Checkin' Out" ===
Raven steps up to organize an important photo shoot showcasing Donna Cabonna's new fashion line for young men at the Tipton Hotel in Boston because Tiffany, the usual assistant, is sick with a fever. Donna gives her a Secretech, a device for secretaries that helps organize events, and has Raven conduct a video conference on it. She assures Donna that she knows how to use one, even though she doesn't, and no one can help her. She accidentally sends the photographer, Pistache, to the Tipton in Milan, Italy. Also, the models (Juan and Kvelte) did not get their plane ticket from Raven, so the models are stuck in the made-up country of Budapragoslovakia. While Raven is talking to Secretech support, she has a vision involving a celebrity named Tyler Sparks (Tiffany Thornton), tripping and falling. She then tells Zack and Cody to hold their arms out, and they end up catching Tyler, which is how she gets the twins to help her. As a result, Raven substitutes the fashion models with Zack and Cody, and she pretends to be Pistache. Donna Cabonna finds out the bad news, so she tries to take matters into her own hands by impersonating the photographer too. As the two Pistache impersonators are doing the photo shoot, the real Pistache comes in, having arrived by "an outrageously expensive private jet" (billed to Donna Cabona). She notes that Zack and Cody are not the models she chose, but they are even better. She tells them to turn around, and she takes pictures of their backs. The episode seems to end on a happy note with Raven's vision that has Donna Cabonna saying that the boy's line is a success. However, the episode turns sour when Raven misses her flight because her Secretech has the wrong time in Boston, which is 3 hours ahead from San Francisco. Raven then decides to recheck into her hotel room and asks the clerk for a wake-up call tomorrow morning.

Meanwhile, Cory and Eddie find out that Chelsea is a natural at paddle ball, so they try to get Chelsea to break the record for the world's longest paddle ball session, so they can claim the prize money. They think they have the record in the bag until the competition—none other than Stanley—proves to be a formidable paddle ball opponent. Stanley scams Chelsea by making her win the title and prize money. She then feels bad and ends up giving Stanley the money. Cory and Eddie are furious with Chelsea because Stanley has scammed her. Chelsea responds that not only does she not feel scammed, but both she and Stanley got what they wanted, the record and the money, respectively. When Eddie and Cory protest that they did not get what they wanted (a share of the prize money), she slyly responds that they "got what they deserved" (which was nothing). Then she proceeds to break the record for the longest paddle ball session behind her back.

=== "That's So Suite Life of Hannah Montana" ===
After the Tipton's concierge, Irene, tells Raven that her flight is cancelled, Raven is stuck in Boston for the weekend. She then has a vision that Cody is in danger of being attacked. Raven tells them that she has a "feeling" that the one in a sweater vest is in trouble and should avoid sneezing followed by bells. Cody, the only twin that wears sweater vests, becomes paranoid and avoids anything that remotely resembles Raven's vision – even the surprise birthday party that he, Zack, and the other Tipton employees are throwing for Carey. Zack then switches clothes with Cody to make him go to the party and wears his black sweater vest to Carey's surprise party, while Cody wears one of his other shirts. However, he ends up landing head first in the vanilla flavor birthday cake when Arwin's babysitting machine, his gift to Carey, goes out of control.

Meanwhile, Maddie is trying to help Raven by getting London to wear one of Raven's original designs, but London swears she'll never wear anything that's not from a famous designer – even her diapers were made by designers. Maddie then switches the label of London's Attoro Vittali and sews it onto Raven's dress. London wears the dress, thinking that it is a Vittali original. Maddie tells her the truth, and London gets upset that Maddie tricked her into wearing a dress that wasn't made by a famous person, but changes her mind when teen pop star Hannah Montana checks in and admires Raven's dress, asking her to make a similar one, to which she replies that it is a "one-of-a-kind Raven Baxter original made only for her" (London). Later, Hannah starts a catfight with London over the dress, and Raven is overjoyed by this, but as Hannah goes up to London to get a closer look at the dress, her ring gets caught in it, and it tears (off camera), much to Raven's anger.

=== "On the Road Again?" ===
When Hannah Montana/Miley Stewart stays at the Tipton, she befriends the candy counter girl Maddie Fitzpatrick. Listening to Miley's dad sing, Maddie says that he sounds just like Robbie Ray, the "Honkytonk Heartthrob", before realizing that he is Robbie Ray. Apparently, both she and her mother were Robbie Ray fans. When Maddie talks to Hannah/Miley about his career back in the day, Miley starts to believe that her father gave up his dream to sing so that Miley could pursue her own career as Hannah Montana. To give him back the stage of life, she recruits the help of his former manager to get Robby back on the road. Robby goes to San Diego, while Hannah's bodyguard Roxy Roker takes care of Miley and her brother Jackson. Unfortunately, Roxy is very overprotective and will not let the children go out of her sight, and even ties them up along with her when they sleep. Jackson gets fed up and goes to San Diego, followed by Miley and Roxy. Billy Ray Cyrus (as Robbie Ray) performs "I Want My Mullet Back" in this episode. However, upon watching his father's performance and hearing about him being offered to go on tour in Hawaii with Toby Keith, Jackson changes his mind. However, Robby decides not to go on the tour because he doesn't want to leave his kids again. Maddie then also shows up, but is chased away by Roxy. At the end of the episode, both Robby and Miley perform an encore performance of "I Want My Mullet Back", complete with mullet wigs and Jackson, also wearing a mullet, doing the underarm trumpet.

== Home media ==
The DVD release (released as the "Mixed-Up Mashed-Up Edition") was released on January 16, 2007 in the US and on April 21, 2008 in the UK. The disc includes one extra for each of its featured series, with the trivia game "So You Think You Know Raven, Volume 2" (a continuation of a game from the DVD release of "That's So Raven: Raven's Makeover Madness"), a never-before-seen episode of The Suite Life of Zack & Cody ("Health and Fitness", which was later aired in March 2007), and the Hannah Montana music video "Who Said". In New Zealand, the crossover premiered on January 27, 2007; however, the DVD did not release until over a year later in June 2008.

== See also ==
- Wizards on Deck with Hannah Montana (2009)
