= Morgan York =

American novelist, podcaster and former child actress

- Born: 1992 or 1993 (age 32–33); Burbank, California, U.S.
- Occupations: Novelist; podcaster; actress
- Years active: 2001–2010 (acting); 2010–present (writing)
- Known for: Cheaper by the Dozen; Hannah Montana
- Spouse: Danny Haddad (m. 2019)
- Children: 1
- Website: www.morganyork.com

Morgan York (born 1992 or 1993) is an American novelist, podcaster and former child actress from Burbank, California best known for her roles as Kim Baker in the first two films of Cheaper by the Dozen, Lulu in The Pacifier (2005) and as Sarah in the Disney Channel sitcom Hannah Montana.

York retired from acting at age 17 in 2010 and is currently an author, podcaster and book publisher living in New York City.

== Career ==
York made her on-screen debut at just 18 months old in a commercial for Braun ThermoScan Thermometer. Her first major film role came in 2003 when she starred in Cheaper by the Dozen as Kim Baker, which won York and her cast-mates the Young Artist Award for "Best Young Ensemble in a Feature Film" for their performances the following year. Following the awards, she starred as Lulu Plummer in The Pacifier, whose performance was well received. In the summer of 2005, York headed back to Toronto to film Cheaper by the Dozen 2. From 2006 to 2010, York appeared in 11 episodes of the Disney Channel sitcom Hannah Montana, after which she retired from acting. She stated that she would not return to acting in the future.

== Personal life ==
York was born in Burbank, California. Following the conclusion of her character's run on Hannah Montana, she decided to pursue her passion of authoring young adult novels. On her blog, she stated "the older I got, the more I felt like writing was my true calling." She graduated with a self-designed degree in "Writing Fiction: Listening, Absorbing, and Creating" at University of Redlands in 2015.

On July 14, 2019, she shared her moments of marriage to Danny Haddad via Twitter. On November 9, 2023, York revealed on Instagram that she had given birth to a daughter.

== Filmography ==
=== Film ===
Year	Film	Role	Notes
2003	The Vest	Extra	
2003	Cheaper by the Dozen	Kimberly "Kim" Baker	
2005	The Pacifier	Lulu Plummer	
2005	Cheaper by the Dozen 2	Kimberly "Kim" Baker	

=== Television ===
Year	Production	Character	Notes
2001	Sesame Street: Kids' Favorite Songs 2	Herself	Featured with sister Wendy
2004	The Practice	Melissa Stewart	Episode: "Going Home"
2004	Life with Bonnie	Christine Harris	Episode: "Dare to Be Different"
2007	Kappa Mikey	Samoa	Episode: "LilyBoo"
2006–2010	Hannah Montana	Sarah	11 episodes; Guest role (Seasons 1, 3–4); Recurring role (Season 2)

== Awards and nominations ==
Year	Award	Category	Nominated work	Result
2004	Young Artist Awards	Best Young Ensemble in a Feature Film (shared with cast)	Cheaper by the Dozen	Won
2006	Young Artist Awards	Best Performance in a Feature – Young Ensemble Cast (shared with cast)	Cheaper by the Dozen 2	Nominated
