= Jason Earles =

American actor (born 1977)

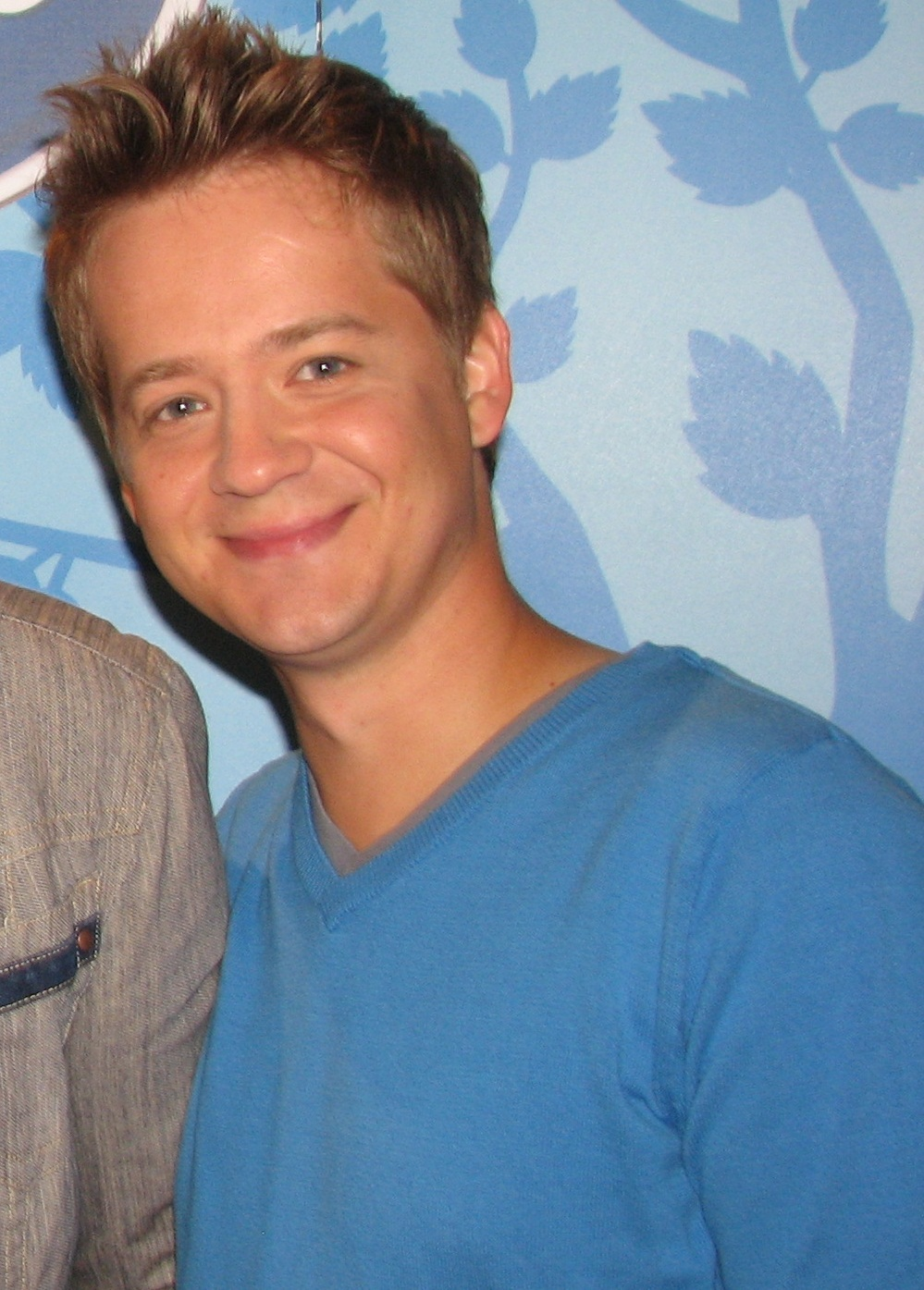
- Earles in August 2010
- Born: Jason Daniel Earles; April 26, 1977 (age 49); San Diego, California, U.S.
- Education: Rocky Mountain College (BA)
- Occupations: Actor; comedian; director
- Years active: 2003–present
- Spouses: Jennifer Earles (m. 2002; div. 2013) Katie Drysen (m. 2017)

Jason Daniel Earles (born April 26, 1977) is an American actor. He is known for his roles as Jackson Stewart in the Disney Channel sitcom Hannah Montana and as Rudy Gillespie in the Disney XD series Kickin' It.

== Early life ==
Earles was born in San Diego, California. After living in Ohio and Washington state, his family moved to Oregon. In Oregon, he graduated from Glencoe High School in Hillsboro. Before moving back to southern California, Earles lived in Billings, Montana, where he graduated in theatre arts from Rocky Mountain College in 2000.

== Career ==
Earles played a nerdy card gamer who was friends with the character Brian Miller in the CBS sitcom Still Standing. In 2004, he appeared in the film National Treasure as Thomas Gates, ancestor of Ben Gates (Nicolas Cage). In 2005, Earles played Ernie Kaplowitz in the film American Pie Presents: Band Camp.

Earles' most notable role was as Jackson Stewart, the older brother of Miley Stewart (Miley Cyrus), in the Disney Channel series Hannah Montana from 2006 to 2011. Earles was 28 years old when the show began, notably older than his 16-year-old character.

He guest-starred twice in the Disney Channel series Phil of the Future as Grady Spaggett, an advanced math student. Earles appeared in the 2006 Disney Channel Games on the Blue Team, and in the 2007 and 2008 Disney Channel Games on the Red team.

Earles was the co-host of Disney Channel's Sing-Along Bowl-athon (Disney Channel's 2006 New Year's Eve special) and the corresponding online voting.

He voiced Spudnik in the 2009 talking dog film Space Buddies. Earles starred as the sensei Rudy Gillespie in the Disney XD original series Kickin' It, which premiered on June 13, 2011.

Earles served as the acting coach for High School Musical: The Musical: The Series and guest-starred in season three as Dewey Wood, a camp counselor.

In 2026, he started a podcast dedicated to Hannah Montana, titled Best of Both Our Worlds, alongside director Shannon Flynn and writer-producer Douglas Danger Lieblein.

== Personal life ==
Earles has contributed cast memorabilia to fundraisers for Rocky Mountain College.

He was married to Jennifer Earles from 2002 to 2013. On August 12, 2017, Jason Earles married Katie Drysen.

== Filmography ==
=== Film ===
Film
Year	Title	Role	Notes
2004	National Treasure	Thomas Gates	
2004	Table 6	Bus boy	Short film
2005	American Pie Presents: Band Camp	Ernie Kaplowitz	Direct-to-video
2005	Special Ed	Young David	
2007	Gordon Glass	The Boss	
2009	Space Buddies	Spudnick (voice)	Direct-to-video
2009	Hannah Montana: The Movie	Jackson Stewart	
2013	Super Buddies	Jack Schaeffer	Direct-to-video
2014	Hunted	Dax	
2018	Battle Drone	Dax	
2026	Second Chances		

=== Television ===
Television
Year	Title	Role	Notes
2003	MADtv	Swirley kid	Season 8, episode 18
2003	The Shield	Kyle	Episode: "Breakpoint"
2003	Malcolm in the Middle	Marshal School pupil on the left	Uncredited; episode: "Academic Octathalon"
2004	Still Standing	Goran the Invincible	Episode: "Still Winning"
2005	One on One	Brad	Episode: "Glug, Glug"
2005–2006	Phil of the Future	Grady Spaggett	2 episodes
2006–2011	Hannah Montana	Jackson Stewart	Main cast; 98 episodes
2007	Shorty McShorts' Shorts	Guy / SheZow (voice)	Episode: "SheZow"
2008	Boston Legal	Mitchy Weston	Episode: "Indecent Proposals"
2009	Yin Yang Yo!	Himself (voice)	Episode: "Yin! Yang! You!"
2009	Aaron Stone	Hunter	Episode: "S.T.A.N. by Me"
2009	Dadnapped	Merv	Television film
2010–2014	Fish Hooks	Kevin / Hamster boy (voice)	2 episodes
2011–2015	Kickin' It	Rudy Gillespie	Main cast; 83 episodes, Co-producer (seasons 2-4), Directed 4 episodes
2013	Randy Cunningham: 9th Grade Ninja	Brent (voice)	Episode: "Sword Quest"
2016	Best Friends Whenever	Dax Fraggins	Episode: "The Friendship Code"
2016–2018	WTH: Welcome to Howler	Chuck	8 episodes
2017	Vampirina	Curt Spookman (voice)	Episode: "Little Terror/Super Natural"
2017	Linda from HR	Todd	Television film
2019	Mood Swings	Angel	Main role; 8 episodes
2020	Just Roll with It	Skeeter Swindell	Episode: "Shayna Pennsylvania"
2022–2023	High School Musical: The Musical: The Series	Dewey Wood	Recurring (season 3), Guest (season 4); 8 episodes

=== Web series ===
Web
Year	Title	Role	Notes
2013	The Most Popular Girls in School	Santa (voice)	Episode: "Mall Santa"
2013	The Most Popular Girls in School	Jennifer McMinamin (voice)	Episode: "New Year"
2017	Betch	David	Episode: "A Makeup-Free Sketch Show"
2018	Hotel Du Loone	Flynt Rogers	Main role; Brat sitcom

== Awards and nominations ==
Year	Award	Category	Work	Result	Ref.
2009	Teen Choice Awards	Choice Movie Actor: Music/Dance	Hannah Montana: The Movie	Nominated	
