= Hannah Montana discography =

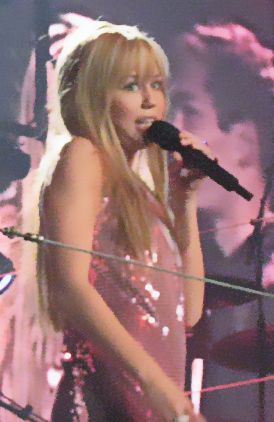
- Cyrus performing as Montana in November 2007
- Soundtrack albums: 5
- Live albums: 1
- Compilation albums: 3
- Singles: 11
- Remix albums: 2
- Promotional singles: 4
- Box sets: 3
- Karaoke albums: 5

Disney character Hannah Montana, portrayed by American singer Miley Cyrus has released five soundtrack albums, one live album, two remix albums, three compilation albums, three box sets, five karaoke albums, 11 singles and 4 promotional singles.

Cyrus' first musical effort credited to the Montana character was on March 28, 2006, with seven tracks on the show's first soundtrack, which debuted at number one in the United States, and peaked in the top ten on the UK Compilations Chart. The second soundtrack, Hannah Montana 2, topped the charts in the U.S., the Hannah Montana: The Movie soundtrack peaked at number one in Austria, Canada, New Zealand, Spain, the U.S., and Turkey, and Hannah Montana 3 topped the Billboard Kid Albums and Soundtracks charts. The first remix album, Hannah Montana 2: Non-Stop Dance Party, peaked at number seven in the U.S., and the second, Hannah Montana Hits Remixed, peaked at number 103. The first live album, Best of Both Worlds Concert, peaked at number one on the Kid Albums chart. The fifth and final Hannah Montana soundtrack, Hannah Montana Forever, was released on October 19, 2010, peaked at number 11 on the Billboard 200.

20 songs have charted on the Billboard Hot 100. "He Could Be the One" has proved to be the most successful in the United States, peaking at number ten on the chart.

== Albums ==
=== Soundtrack albums ===
List of soundtrack albums, with selected chart positions and certifications
Title	Details	Peak chart positions										Certifications
Title	Details	US	AUS	AUT	CAN	FRA	NOR	NZ	POR	SPA	UK	Certifications
Hannah Montana	Released: October 24, 2006; Label: Walt Disney; Formats: CD, CD+DVD, digital download, streaming, LP	1	35	14	10	122	11	22	—	14	— (Note: Hannah Montana did not enter the UK Albums Chart, but peaked at number seven on the UK Compilation Chart.)	RIAA: 3× Platinum; BPI: Gold; MC: Gold; PMB: Gold; RMNZ: Gold
Hannah Montana 2	Released: June 26, 2007; Label: Walt Disney; Formats: 2CDs, CD+DVD, digital download, streaming, LP	1	20	13	3	178	8	6	12	46	— (Note: Hannah Montana 2 did not enter the UK Albums Chart, but peaked at number eight on the UK Compilation Chart.)	RIAA: 4× Platinum; ARIA: Platinum; BPI: Gold; MC: 2× Platinum; RMNZ: Platinum
Hannah Montana: The Movie	Released: March 24, 2009; Label: Walt Disney; Formats: CD, digital download, streaming, LP	1	6	1	1	32	2	1	1	1	— (Note: Hannah Montana: The Movie did not enter the UK Albums Chart, but peaked at number three on the UK Compilation Chart.)	RIAA: 2× Platinum; ARIA: Platinum; BPI: Gold; IRMA: Platinum; PMB: Gold; RMNZ: 3× Platinum
Hannah Montana 3	Released: June 3, 2009; Label: Walt Disney; Formats: CD, digital download, streaming, LP	2	27	4	2	86	16	16	4	6	— (Note: Hannah Montana 3 did not enter the UK Albums Chart, but peaked at number five on the UK Compilation Chart.)	IRMA: Gold
Hannah Montana Forever	Released: October 15, 2010; Label: Walt Disney; Formats: CD, digital download, streaming, LP	11	65	25	—	55	—	32	9	23	38	RIAA: Gold; BPI: Silver; PMB: Gold
"—" denotes items which did not chart in that country.

=== Live albums ===
List of live albums, with selected chart positions and certifications
Title	Details	Peak chart positions										Certifications
Title	Details	US	AUS	AUT	CAN	GER	IRL	NZ	SPA	SWI	UK	Certifications
Best of Both Worlds Concert	Released: March 11, 2008; Label: Walt Disney, Hollywood; Formats: CD+DVD, digital download, streaming	3	16	14	3	94	10	27	46	54	29	ARIA: Gold; PMB: Gold

=== Remix albums ===
List of remix albums, with selected chart positions and certifications
Title	Details	Peak chart positions				Certifications
Title	Details	US	US Dance	US Kid	UK Budget	Certifications
Hannah Montana 2: Non-Stop Dance Party	Released: January 29, 2008; Label: Walt Disney; Formats: CD, digital download, streaming	7	1	1	—	PMB: Gold
Hannah Montana Hits Remixed	Released: August 19, 2008; Label: Walt Disney; Formats: CD, digital download, streaming	103	—	4	49	
"—" denotes items which did not chart in that country.

=== Compilation albums ===
List of compilation albums, with selected chart positions
Title	Details	Peak chart positions	
Title	Details	US Kid	US Vinyl
Best of Hannah Montana	Released: August 8, 2011; Label: Walt Disney; Formats: CD, LP, digital download, streaming	—	—
Best of Hannah Montana (Note: Urban Outfitters exclusive compilation with selected tracks from the Hannah Montana and Hannah Montana 2 soundtracks. While this vinyl release shares the same title as the 2011 release, the album covers and tracklists are completely different.)	Released: April 26, 2019; Label: Walt Disney; Format: Vinyl	4	23
Hannah Montana: The Hits	Released: April 3, 2026; Label: Walt Disney; Format: Streaming	—	—
"—" denotes items which did not chart in that country.

=== Box sets ===
List of box sets, with selected chart positions
Title	Details	Peak chart positions	
Title	Details	BEL (WA)	UK Comp.
Hannah Montana - The Collection	Released: 2009; Label: Walt Disney; Formats: 4CDs, digital download, streaming	—	23
Hannah Montana X-mas Fan Box	Released: November 10, 2009; Label: EMI; Format: 3CDs+DVD	64	—
Hannah Montana / Hannah Montana: The Movie	Released: April 29, 2011; Label: Walt Disney; Format: 2CDs	—	—
"—" denotes items which did not chart in that country.

=== Karaoke albums ===
List of karaoke albums, with selected chart positions
Title	Details	Peak chart positions	
Title	Details	US Kid	UK Budget
Disney's Karaoke Series: Hannah Montana	Released: 2007; Label: Walt Disney; Format: CD, digital download, streaming	—	—
Disney's Karaoke Series: Hannah Montana 2	Released: June 12, 2008; Label: Walt Disney; Formats: CD, digital download, streaming	14	2
Disney's Karaoke Series: Hannah Montana: The Movie	Released: March 24, 2009; Label: Walt Disney; Formats: CD, digital download, streaming	—	—
Disney's Karaoke Series: Hannah Montana 3	Released: October 13, 2009; Label: Walt Disney; Formats: CD, digital download, streaming	—	—
Disney's Karaoke Series: Hannah Montana	Released: 2011 (compilation); Label: Walt Disney; Format: CD	—	—
"—" denotes items which did not chart in that country.

== Singles ==
List of singles, with selected chart positions, showing year released and album name
Title	Year	Peak chart positions										Certifications	Album
Title	Year	US	US Holiday Dig.	US Kid	US Pop Dig.	AUS	AUT	CAN	GER	IRL	UK	Certifications	Album
"The Best of Both Worlds"	2006	92	—	24	—	— (Note: The original version of "The Best of Both Worlds" did not enter the ARIA Top 100 Singles Chart, but the live version with Miley Cyrus peaked at number seven on the ARIA Top 20 Hitseekers Singles Chart.)	—	—	66	17	43	RIAA: Platinum; BPI: Silver	Hannah Montana
"Who Said"	2006	83	—	—	—	—	—	— (Note: "Who Said" did not enter the Canadian Hot 100, but peaked at number 65 on the Hot Canadian Digital Song Sales chart.)	—	—	152	RIAA: Gold	Hannah Montana
"Nobody's Perfect"	2007	27	—	—	—	87	—	— (Note: "Nobody's Perfect" did not enter the Canadian Hot 100, but peaked at number 73 on the Hot Canadian Digital Song Sales chart.)	—	—	120	RIAA: Platinum	Hannah Montana 2
"Make Some Noise"	2007	92	—	—	—	—	—	—	—	—	—		Hannah Montana 2
"Rockin' Around the Christmas Tree"	2007	—	41	3	—	—	—	—	—	—	—		Hannah Montana
"If We Were a Movie"	2007	47	—	—	—	—	—	—	—	—	—	RIAA: Platinum	Hannah Montana
"The Other Side of Me"	2009	84	—	—	—	—	—	—	—	—	—		Hannah Montana
"Let's Get Crazy"	2009	57	—	7	—	—	—	26	—	—	115	RIAA: Gold	Hannah Montana: The Movie
"Ice Cream Freeze (Let's Chill)"	2009	87	—	7	—	—	—	57	—	—	90		Hannah Montana 3
"Supergirl"	2009	— (Note: "Supergirl" did not enter the Billboard Hot 100, but peaked at number five on the Bubbling Under Hot 100 chart.)	—	—	—	—	58	—	42	—	—		Hannah Montana 3
"Ordinary Girl"	2010	91	—	7	22	—	—	—	—	—	93	RIAA: Gold	Hannah Montana Forever
"Are You Ready"	2010	—	—	16	—	—	—	—	—	—	—		Hannah Montana Forever
"Gonna Get This" (featuring Iyaz)	2010	66	—	1	16	75	—	—	—	—	—	RIAA: Gold	Hannah Montana Forever
"I'm Still Good"	2010	—	—	2	36	—	—	—	—	—	—		Hannah Montana Forever
"—" denotes releases that did not chart or were not released in that territory.

== Other charted songs ==
List of other charted songs, with selected chart positions, showing year released and album name
Title	Year	Peak chart positions							Certifications	Album
Title	Year	US	US Kid	US Pop Dig.	AUS	CAN	NOR	UK	Certifications	Album
"Just Like You"	2006	99	—	—	—	—	—	—		Hannah Montana
"Pumpin' Up the Party"	2006	81	—	—	—	—	—	—		Hannah Montana
"I Got Nerve"	2006	67	—	—	—	—	—	—	RIAA: Gold	Hannah Montana
"This Is the Life"	2006	89	—	—	—	—	—	—		Hannah Montana
"We Got the Party"	2007	—	—	—	—	98	—	—		Hannah Montana 2
"Rock Star"	2007	81	—	—	— (Note: "Rock Star" did not enter the ARIA Top 100 Singles Chart, but peaked at number 11 on the ARIA Top 20 Hitseekers Singles Chart.)	80	—	—	RIAA: Platinum	Hannah Montana 2
"Life's What You Make It"	2007	25	—	—	— (Note: "Life's What You Make It" did not enter the ARIA Top 100 Singles Chart, but peaked at number 12 on the ARIA Top 20 Hitseekers Singles Chart.)	—	—	—	RIAA: Gold	Hannah Montana 2
"One in a Million"	2007	— (Note: "One in a Million" did not enter the Billboard Hot 100, but peaked at number 12 on the Bubbling Under Hot 100 chart.)	—	—	—	—	—	—	RIAA: Gold	Hannah Montana 2
"True Friend"	2007	99	10	—	— (Note: "True Friend" did not enter the ARIA Top 100 Singles Chart, but peaked at number 14 on the ARIA Top 20 Hitseekers Singles Chart.)	—	—	—	RIAA: Gold	Hannah Montana 2
"You'll Always Find Your Way Back Home"	2009	81	24	—	—	76	—	114	RIAA: Platinum; BPI: Silver	Hannah Montana: The Movie
"Let's Do This"	2009	— (Note: "Let's Do This" did not enter the Billboard Hot 100, but peaked at number 23 on the Bubbling Under Hot 100 chart.)	—	—	—	— (Note: "Let's Do This" did not enter the Canadian Hot 100, but peaked at number 69 on the Hot Canadian Digital Song Sales chart.)	—	—		Hannah Montana: The Movie
"It's All Right Here"	2009	— (Note: "It's All Right Here" did not enter the Billboard Hot 100, but peaked at number 24 on the Bubbling Under Hot 100 chart.)	—	—	—	—	—	—		Hannah Montana 3
"He Could Be the One"	2009	10	—	—	64	97	13	103	RIAA: Platinum; BPI: Silver	Hannah Montana 3
"Just a Girl"	2009	—	4	—	—	—	—	—		Hannah Montana 3
"I Wanna Know You" (featuring David Archuleta)	2009	74	4	—	—	—	—	—		Hannah Montana 3
"Don't Wanna Be Torn"	2009	— (Note: "Don't Wanna Be Torn" did not enter the Billboard Hot 100, but peaked at number four on the Bubbling Under Hot 100 chart.)	—	—	—	—	—	—		Hannah Montana 3
"Que Sera"	2010	—	6	—	—	—	—	—		Hannah Montana Forever
"Kiss It Goodbye"	2010	—	10	—	—	—	—	—		Hannah Montana Forever
"I'll Always Remember You"	2010	—	3	—	—	—	—	—	RIAA: Gold	Hannah Montana Forever
"Need a Little Love" (featuring Sheryl Crow)	2010	—	15	—	—	—	—	—		Hannah Montana Forever
"Love That Lets Go" (featuring Billy Ray Cyrus)	2010	—	9	—	—	—	—	—		Hannah Montana Forever
"Been Here All Along"	2010	—	5	—	—	—	—	—		Hannah Montana Forever
"Barefoot Cinderella"	2010	—	7	—	—	—	—	—		Hannah Montana Forever
"Wherever I Go"	2010	— (Note: "Wherever I Go" did not enter the Billboard Hot 100, but peaked at number 17 on the Bubbling Under Hot 100 chart.)	1	42	—	—	—	—		Hannah Montana Forever
"—" denotes releases that did not chart or were not released in that territory.

== Performance videos ==
Song	Year
"The Best of Both Worlds"	2006
"Who Said"	2006
"This Is the Life"	2006
"Pumpin' Up the Party"	2006
"The Other Side of Me"	2006
"Just Like You"	2006
"Nobody's Perfect"	2007
"Make Some Noise"	2007
"Life's What You Make It"	2007
"True Friend"	2007
"Old Blue Jeans"	2007
"One in a Million"	2007
"Bigger Than Us"	2007
"Let's Get Crazy"	2009
"It's All Right Here"	2009
"Let's Do This"	2009
"Ice Cream Freeze (Let's Chill)"	2009
"Supergirl"	2009
"Just a Girl"	2009
"Mixed Up"	2009
"Every Part of Me"	2009

== See also ==
- List of songs recorded by Miley Cyrus
- List of Hannah Montana songs
