= Let's Do This =

Song by Hannah Montana

from the album Hannah Montana: The Movie
- Released: March 24, 2009
- Recorded: 2008
- Genre: Dance-rock
- Length: 3:32
- Label: Walt Disney
- Songwriters: Derek George; Tim Owens; Adam Tefteller
- Producers: Ali Dee Theodore; Jason Gleed; Alana da Fonseca

"Let's Do This" is a song by fictional character Hannah Montana, recorded by American singer and actress Miley Cyrus for the soundtrack to the film Hannah Montana: The Movie (2009). It is also included on the Hannah Montana 3 soundtrack.

== Background ==
On "Let's Do This", a party dance track, Cyrus sings about owing her fans a good performance with lines such as: "You came a long way to be with us / You paid good money to see a show / So let's get ready 'cause here we go". The song was originally written and recorded by singer Adam Tefteller.

== Promotion ==
The song supports the third season of Hannah Montana. "Let's Do This" was featured four times during the third season in the episodes: "Papa's Got a New Friend", "Jake... Another Little Piece of My Heart", "Miley Hurt the Feelings of the Radio Star" and "He Could Be the One". It was also used as background music in Hannah Montana: Sing Whaaat?, various commercials for Hannah Montana: The Movie and in the ending credits for the film.

== Music video ==
A music video for the song premiered on Disney Channel on December 13, 2008. The video features footage of Miley Cyrus (as Montana) performing the song during a live filmed concert. The performance included dance routines, lifting, and fireworks. The video, along with seven others are available in the iTunes deluxe edition and the physical CD of Hannah Montana 3.

== Formats and track listings ==
Digital download
No.	Title	Length
1.	"Let's Do This" (album version)	3:32
2.	"Let's Do This" (live video version)	3:35

== Chart performance ==
The song debuted and peaked at number 23 on the Bubbling Under Hot 100 Chart (Hot 100 - 123) and falling off the next week; being Hannah Montana's lowest chart entry, then was beat by "It's All Right Here". And in Canada the track charted on Hot Canadian Digital Singles at no. 69, but failed to chart on the Canadian Hot 100.

=== Charts ===
Chart (2009)	Peak position
Hot Canadian Digital Singles	69
U.S. Billboard Bubbling Under Hot 100	23

== Release history ==
Region	Date	Label	Formats
United States	December 13, 2008	Walt Disney Records	Radio Disney
United States	March 24, 2009	Walt Disney Records	Digital Download

== Credits and personnel ==
- Vocals – Miley Cyrus as Hannah Montana
- Producer – Ali Dee Theodore, Jason Gleed and Alana da Fonseca
- Writer (s) – Derek George, Tim Owens, Adam Tefteller and Ali Dee Theodore
- Mixer and additional programming – Brian Malouf
