= Ice Cream Freeze (Let's Chill) =

Single by Hannah Montana

from the album Hannah Montana 3
- Released: July 31, 2009
- Genre: Dance-pop; teen pop; country pop
- Length: 3:07
- Label: Walt Disney
- Songwriters: Matthew Gerrard; Robbie Nevil
- Producer: Matthew Gerrard

Miley Cyrus singles chronology
"Supergirl" (2009)	"Ice Cream Freeze (Let's Chill)" (2009)	"Party in the U.S.A." (2009)

"Ice Cream Freeze (Let's Chill)" is a song by fictional character Hannah Montana, recorded by American singer and actress Miley Cyrus for the soundtrack album Hannah Montana 3 (2009), which accompanied the third season of the Disney Channel series Hannah Montana. It was released by Walt Disney Records on July 31, 2009, as the second and final single from the soundtrack album. The song was written by Matthew Gerrard and Robbie Nevil and produced by Gerrard.

A karaoke version is available in Disney's Karaoke Series: Hannah Montana 3. It is an instructional dance song with a country pop sound and lyrics referencing ice cream and other frozen treats.

The song garnered negative reviews from critics but enjoyed humble commercial success for Cyrus in several countries, compared to those of her previous efforts as Montana. "Ice Cream Freeze (Let's Chill)" made its highest peak by charting at number fifty-seven on the Canadian Hot 100 chart. The song also charted in the United Kingdom and the United States. A music video for "Ice Cream Freeze (Let's Chill)" was released, taken of footage from a concert performance.

== Background ==
"Ice Cream Freeze (Let's Chill)" was co-written by Matthew Gerrard and Robbie Nevil, a duo of longtime songwriters for Montana; Together, they wrote her hit "The Best of Both Worlds" (2006). A karaoke version is available in Disney's Karaoke Series: Hannah Montana 3. "Ice Cream Freeze (Let's Chill)" has corresponding dance moves designed by Jamal Sims, which are heavily influenced by line dancing. It was first titled "Let's Chill" and leaked into the Internet in November 2008, along with six other songs from the soundtrack. The song first premiered on Radio Disney on May 22, 2009, in order to promote the soundtrack; it was afterward released as a promotional single from Hannah Montana 3 on June 30, 2009, as part of Radio Disney's iTunes Pass, an exclusive campaign launched by the iTunes Store.

== Composition ==
"Ice Cream Freeze (Let's Chill)" is a country pop song with a length of three minutes and seven seconds. According to AllMusic, "Ice Cream Freeze (Let's Chill)" contains dance-pop and teen pop influences in its musical composition. Warren Truitt of About.com also cited dance music as the song's "craze". The song is set in common time and has a moderate dance groove tempo. It is written in the key of F major and it follows the chord progression F–E♭–B♭. Peter Larsen of the Orange County Register believed the song was "more or less literally is about ice cream and other frozen delights", referencing the lines "Do the ice cream freeze, strike a pose / Can you do the milkshake / Shake it, shake it down low".

== Reception ==
=== Critical reception ===
The song garnered negative reactions from contemporary critics. Heather Phares of Allmusic said, "'Ice Cream Freeze (Let's Chill),' [...] sounds extremely similar to the soundtrack's 'Hoedown Throwdown.' That feeling of familiarity extends to the songs that haven't appeared anywhere else." Warren Truitt of About.com agreed and described the song to be "silly" and "as awkwardly goofy" as "Hoedown Throwdown". Peter Larsen of the Orange County Register identified the track to be a "crowd pleaser".

=== Chart performance ===
On the week ending July 25, 2009, "Ice Cream Freeze (Let's Chill)" debuted and peaked at number eighty-seven on the Billboard Hot 100; the following week, it dropped out of the chart. On the week ending 2009, the song debuted and peaked at number fifty seven in the Canadian Hot 100, thus becoming Cyrus' second highest-charting song as Montana in Canada. The song dropped to number one-hundred in the following week and completely fell from the chart the week after. On the week ending August 1, 2009, "Ice Cream Freeze (Let's Chill)" entered the UK Singles Chart at number ninety-five. It marked Cyrus' first entry in the country as Montana since "The Best Both Worlds", which charted in March 2007. On the week ending August 8, 2009, the song reached its peak on the chart at number ninety.

== Live performances ==
Cyrus, dressed as Montana, premiered "Ice Cream Freeze (Let's Chill)", along with eight other songs, at the concert taping for the third season of Hannah Montana, which was set on October 10 in Irvine, California at the Verizon Wireless Amphitheatre. In the performance, Montana dressed in a black tee shirt with a pink star, pink zebra patterned skirt, pink cowboy boots and a bejeweled vest and performed the corresponding choreography. Six backup dancers, also costumed by Western clothing, later appeared to perform. Peter Larsen of the Orange County Register recalled his two children enjoying the dance and referred to it as "probably one of the most popular of the eight new songs Miley performs tonight." The performance was later released as the song's music video on May 22, 2009, on Disney Channel.

== Charts ==
Chart performance
Chart (2009–2010)	Peak position
Canada Hot 100 (Billboard)	57
UK Singles (Official Charts)	90
US Billboard Hot 100	87
US Kid Digital Song Sales (Billboard)	7
