= Hannah Montana 3 =

2009 soundtrack album by Hannah Montana

Soundtrack album by Hannah Montana
- Released: July 6, 2009
- Recorded: 2008
- Genres: Country pop; pop rock
- Length: 45:11
- Label: Walt Disney
- Producers: Mitch Allan; Kara DioGuardi; Aris Archontis; Jeannie Lurie; Chen Neeman; Antonina Armato; Tim James; Ali Dee Theodore; Jason Gleed; Alana da Fonseca; Marti Frederiksen; Toby Gad; Arama Brown; Dreamlab; Adam Watts; Andy Dodd; Matthew Gerrard; The Collective; Smidi; Justin Gray

Miley Cyrus chronology
Hannah Montana: The Movie (2009)	Hannah Montana 3 (2009)	The Time of Our Lives (2009)

Singles from Hannah Montana 3
- 1. "Supergirl" Released: July 7, 2009; 2. "Ice Cream Freeze (Let's Chill)" Released: July 31, 2009

Hannah Montana 3 is the soundtrack album for the third season of the television series Hannah Montana. Thirteen of its fourteen tracks are performed by the series' primary actress Miley Cyrus, and are credited to her titular character Hannah Montana. One of its actors Mitchel Musso contributes one song, while recording artists David Archuleta and Corbin Bleu appear as featured vocalists. In the vein of earlier soundtracks from the franchise, Hannah Montana 3 is primarily a pop rock record, which sees additional influences from teen pop and country pop musical styles.

Hannah Montana 3 received generally favorable reviews from music critics, who appreciated the combination of upbeat tracks and mid-tempo ballads. It debuted at number two on the Billboard 200, selling about 137,000 copies.

"Supergirl" was released as the first single of the album on July 7, 2009, on CD and in digital markets. "Ice Cream Freeze (Let's Chill)" was released in Italy as the album's second single on July 31, 2009.

== Background and release ==
During 2008 and 2009, Cyrus recorded songs for the third season of the television series and for Hannah Montana: The Movie, the feature film based on the show, repeating "Let's Do This" and "Let's Get Crazy" the movie's soundtrack and the show's. Several producers and songwriters worked on songs for the album including, American Idol judge, Kara DioGuardi who co-produced and co-wrote "Mixed Up", "He Could Be the One", "Supergirl" and "Don't Wanna Be Torn". "The Best of Both Worlds" writing team Matthew Gerrard and Robbie Nevil contributed to the album as well, in "Ice Cream Freeze (Let's Chill)". Colleen Fitzpatrick (Vitamin C) is a writer on "Let's Get Crazy" and Tim James on "Let's Do This" which was originally written and recorded by country singer Adam Tefteller before recorded by Cyrus as Montana. The only song not to feature vocals by Cyrus is the track "Let's Make This Last 4Ever" which is performed by Hannah Montana co-star Mitchel Musso. Two duets, though both were originally recorded by only Cyrus: "I Wanna Know You" with David Archuleta and a new version of Hannah Montana's "If We Were a Movie" with Corbin Bleu that was used in the season two finale, are also featured on the album.

The album was released as a physical CD and as a digital download on July 7, 2009. The deluxe edition sold exclusively to the iTunes Store and the physical CD contains access to 8 music videos taken from a concert filmed in California. Other countries feature two discs, one for the songs and the other for the music videos. In the UK, on September 7, 2009, a special edition of the album, with a slightly different cover (a heading on top saying it is a special edition), and with a CD and DVD was released in stores. The DVD featured the 8 live music videos; the set also included a free poster and bonus computer content. On October 30, 2009, Walt Disney Records released a karaoke version of the album titled Disney's Karaoke Series: Hannah Montana 3 the original release date was October 13, 2009, reason for the change of the release is unknown. The album features eight karaoke and eight vocal version of songs based from the soundtrack.

== Singles and charted songs ==
The music video for "It's All Right Here" premiered on Disney Channel in November 2008. The track peaked on the Bubbling Under Hot 100 Singles Chart at number 24. The video for "Let's Do This" premiered on Disney Channel on December 13, 2008. The song debuted and peaked on the Bubbling Under Hot 100 Singles Chart at number 23. "Let's Get Crazy" was first used in Hannah Montana: The Movie and featured on the movie's soundtrack, before being used in the series. A music video premiered on January 19, 2009, as part of promotion for the film. It debuted and peaked at number 57 on the Billboard Hot 100; in the Canadian Hot 100, the track peaked at number 26, being Hannah's highest chart effort in Canada. "Let's Get Crazy" is also featured on the compilation album, Disney Channel Playlist and as a karaoke version on Disney Karaoke Series: Disney Channel, Vol. 1. It was also the only song from the album to be featured on Cyrus' solo tour Wonder World Tour. "I Wanna Know You" is a duet from the soundtrack with David Archuleta. "I Wanna Know You" was first released to Radio Disney on May 2, 2009. The song debuted and peaked at number 74 on the Billboard Hot 100. "Ice Cream Freeze (Let's Chill)" is the first single from Hannah Montana 3. It premiered on June 20, 2009, on Radio Disney and the music video premiered on Disney Channel June 5 "Ice Cream Freeze (Let's Chill)" and its corresponding video became digitally available in the iTunes Store on June 20, as part of the Radio Disney iTunes Pass in Week # 2, being the only single to be released before the release of the album. "Ice Cream Freeze (Let's Chill)" peaked on the Billboard Hot 100 at number 87, at number 57 in the Canadian Hot 100 and at number 90 in the UK Singles Chart.

"He Could Be the One" was used for promotion with an accompanying music video for an hour-long episode of Hannah Montana of the same name. The song peaked at number 10 on the Billboard Hot 100, beating Mariah Carey's "Obsessed", and number 97 on the Canadian Hot 100. This making Hannah Montana's highest chart effort (beating "Life's What You Make It" by 15 spots), first top ten chart entry, and highest debut, internationally. "Just a Girl" premiered on Radio Disney from Hannah Montana 3. Its music video premiered on June 30, 2009. "Supergirl" is the second single and premiered on July 2, 2009. It made a chart effort on the Bubbling Under Hot 100 Chart at number 5, just below "Don't Wanna Be Torn". The song was released as the only official single internationally with a CD single of the song being released to German markets on August 28, 2009, with "Every Part of Me" as the B-side. It peaked at number forty-two in the country. Though it officially premiered on Radio Disney on July 2, 2009, it was released for actual airplay in November. "Every Part of Me" premiered on Radio Disney on September 16, 2009, and it is from Hannah Montana 3. The music video premiered on October 6, 2009. "Don't Wanna Be Torn" is a song from the Hannah Montana, season 3 soundtrack that premiered on Radio Disney on July 1, 2009, on the week they were promoting the album release. It charted on the Bubbling Under Hot 100 Chart at number 4. Though it premiered on Radio Disney, it has not been officially sent for airplay on the station in 2009

== Promotion ==
In October 2008, Cyrus as Hannah Montana performed a live, taped concert in Irvine, California, where she performed songs from the third season of Hannah Montana for the purpose of having footage for the television show and for promotional purposes such as music videos. Promotional music videos for the songs "It's All Right Here", "Let's Do This", "Ice Cream Freeze (Let's Chill)", "Mixed Up", "Just a Girl", "Let's Get Crazy", "Supergirl", and "Every Part of Me"", were all taken from footage of the concert. The latter five videos were premiered daily between June 29 and July 3, 2009, as a promotional countdown to the album release. Radio Disney premiered the songs from the soundtrack daily from June 29, 2009, up until the album's radio premiere on July 4, three days before the album's release.

The album cover for the Karaoke Series.

Disney Channel also used various commercial segments to promote the album including a segment in which Hannah Montana co-star Jason Earles plays a charades types game titled "Hannah Montana: Sing Whaaat" in which Earles attempts to act out the names of titles of songs from the soundtrack for contestants playing the game; these commercials aired weeks before and after the release of the album. A game, Rock the Beat, on Hannah Montana's official website was made to promote the album, currently featuring eight songs in the soundtrack. Walt Disney Records also advertised the album outside of Disney, by sending commercials to teen-oriented channels. Disney's Karaoke Series album for Hannah Montana 3 was released on October 13, 2009. The album contains sixteen tracks featuring karaoke and vocal versions of eight tracks from the Hannah Montana 3 soundtrack.

== Critical reception ==
Professional ratings
Review scores
Source	Rating
About.com	3.5/5 stars
AllMusic	2.5/5 stars
Entertainment Weekly	(B)

Hannah Montana 3 received generally favorable reviews from music critics. Heather Phares of AllMusic, spoke of the album negatively, even more than Hannah Montana 2 and Hannah Montana: The Movie. On the review, Phares complains that the albums have not grown since the commence of the franchise by stating: "Miley Cyrus was 13 years old when she started performing as Hannah Montana, but by the time Hannah Montana 3 was released, she was nearly 17. That's a pretty big span of time in a teenager's life, but you'd never know it from listening to these songs." Another point which was brought by the reviewer was that the alteration from "fizzy pop" to "searching ballads" was too sudden. She described "Ice Cream Freeze (Let's Chill)" as "extremely similar" to Cyrus's own "Hoedown Throwdown" which wasn't received well by critics and others were too "equally cookie-cutter". To AllMusic the nadir of the album is "Just a Girl". She mentioned "the only thing worse than a big star singing about how fame has damaged her is a big child star singing about how fame has damaged her." Overall she said: "Hannah Montana 3 seems to give fans exactly what they want, but the calculation behind this music overwhelms the fun that used to be in it." Warren Truit of About.com, looked at the album also from "a preteen's point of view" and taking into account that the songs are not supposed to represent her real life. Truit compared "It's All Right Here" and "He Could Be the One" to Shania Twain. He said the songs were a mix of Gwen Stefani, Joan Jett and Avril Lavigne with "fizzy Radio Disney pop rock". They also felt "Ice Cream Freeze" was just as "goofy" as "Hoedown Throwdown". As a summary he commented: "When it comes down to it, the Hannah Montana 3 Soundtrack is harmless, poppy fun for preteen music fans. The tunes on the Hannah Montana 3 Soundtrack may be a little cookie-cutter, but at least the songwriters realize who their audience is and they deliver the goods, unlike the Jonas Brothers' recent genre-jumping mishmash disaster Lines, Vines and Trying Times. Hannah Montana devotees will absolutely love the Hannah Montana 3 Soundtrack, and parents can actually tolerate most of the songs on the album." Mikael Wood of Entertainment Weekly, was also on a lighter and more positive perspective on the album. He said:

"Teen-pop partisans worried by Miley Cyrus' Nashville vibe in Hannah Montana The Movie can breathe easy: These tunes from Cyrus' TV show trade the fiddles for bubble-grunge guitars. I Wanna Know You, a duet with David Archuleta, is a mite too earnest, but Supergirl rocks like primo Kelly Clarkson."

== Commercial performance ==
Hannah Montana 3 debuted and peaked at number two in the United States's chart, Billboard 200, selling 137,000 copies with a good amount being purchased online due to it charting at number 5 in the Top Digital Albums and number 18 in Top Internet Albums. On other charts in the US, such as Top Kid Audio and Top Soundtracks, the album debuted in the top spot. In Top Soundtracks, the franchise replaced herself at number 1, Hannah Montana: The Movie was previously in the top slot and descended to number 2. Cyrus was at the first two positions for several weeks. In its second week, Hannah Montana 3 slid down one spot, to number 3 with 73,000 copies sold (down 47%) in Billboard 200, meanwhile it stayed at number 1 for Top Kid Albums and Top Soundtracks; in the third week of it charting, Hannah Montana 3 fell to number 5. In its fourth week on the charts it slid down to number seven with 41,000 copies sold.

In Canada, the album also debuted at number two, losing the top spot to the third run of Black Eyed Peas' album, The E.N.D. In its second week, the album fell to the fourth spot on the chart and later the sixth. Hannah Montana 3 debuted and peaked at number 40 in Norway. In Mexico, the series' third soundtrack debuted at number 27, the week after, it ascended to number 26.

== Track listing ==
Hannah Montana 3 – Standard edition
No.	Title	Writer(s)	Producer(s)	Length
1.	"It's All Right Here"	Antonina Armato; Tim James	Armato; James	3:49
2.	"Let's Do This"	Derek George; Tim Owens; Adam Tefteller	Theodore; Jason Gleed; Alana da Ponseca	3:32
3.	"Mixed Up"	Kara DioGuardi; Marti Frederiksen	Frederiksen; Anthony Focx	3:52
4.	"He Could Be the One"	DioGuardi; Mitch Allan	Allan; DioGuardi	3:00
5.	"Just a Girl"	Toby Gad; Arama Brown	Gad; Brown	3:35
6.	"I Wanna Know You" (featuring David Archuleta)	Chen Neeman; Jeannie Lurie; Aris Archontis	Lurie; Neeman; Archontis	2:47
7.	"Supergirl"	Daniel James; DioGuardi	Dreamlab	2:54
8.	"Every Part of Me"	Adam Watts; Andy Dodd	Watts; Dodd	3:30
9.	"Ice Cream Freeze (Let's Chill)"	Matthew Gerrard; Robbie Nevil	Gerrard	3:07
10.	"Don't Wanna Be Torn"	Kara DioGuardi; Mitch Allan; LeAnn Rimes; Amanda Leigh Moore	Allan; DioGuardi	3:28
11.	"Let's Get Crazy"	Colleen Fitzpatrick; Michael Kotch; Dave Derby; Michael "Smidi" Smith; Stefanie Ridel; Mim Nervo; Liv Nervo	The Collective; Smidi	2:35
12.	"I Wanna Know You"	Chen Neeman; Jeannie Lurie; Aris Archontis	Lurie; Neeman; Archontis	2:46
13.	"Let's Make This Last 4Ever" (performed by Mitchel Musso)	Justin Gray; Michael Raphael; Sam Musso; Mitchel Musso	Gray	3:12
14.	"If We Were a Movie" (featuring Corbin Bleu)	Jeannie Lurie; Holly Mathis	James; Paul Palmer	3:04
Total length:				45:11

Hannah Montana 3 – Overseas iTunes Store edition (bonus track)
No.	Title	Length
15.	"Hannah Montana 2 Megamix" (Chris Cox)	3:11

Hannah Montana 3 – Deluxe edition (bonus DVD)
No.	Title	Length
1.	"It's All Right Here" (live music video)	3:49
2.	"Let's Do This" (live music video)	3:35
3.	"Every Part of Me" (live music video)	3:31
4.	"Ice Cream Freeze (Let's Chill)" (live music video)	3:01
5.	"Mixed Up" (live music video)	3:51
6.	"Supergirl" (live music video)	2:55
7.	"Just a Girl" (live music video)	3:38
8.	"Let's Get Crazy" (live music video)	2:39

== Charts ==
=== Weekly charts ===
Chart (2009)	Peak position
Australian Albums Chart	27
Austrian Albums Chart	4
Belgian Albums Chart	61
Canadian Albums Chart	2
French Albums Chart	86
German Albums Chart	13
Hungarian Albums (MAHASZ)	17
Irish Compilation Albums	2
Mexican Albums Chart	26
New Zealand Albums Chart	16
Norwegian Albums Chart	16
Poland Albums Chart	4
Portuguese Albums Chart	4
Spanish Albums Chart	6
Swiss Albums Chart	32
UK Compilation Albums	5
US Billboard 200	2
US Billboard Comprehensive Albums	1
US Kid Albums	1
US Soundtracks	1

=== Year-end charts ===
Chart (2009)	Position
Canadian Albums (Billboard)	50
Hungarian Albums (MAHASZ)	41
US Billboard 200	64
US Soundtrack Albums (Billboard)	6

== Certifications ==
Region	Certification	Certified units/sales
Hungary (MAHASZ)	Gold	3,000^{^}
Ireland (IRMA)	Gold	7,500^{^}
Portugal (AFP)	Gold	10,000^{^}
Spain (Promusicae)	Gold	40,000^{^}
^{^} Shipments figures based on certification alone.

== Personnel ==
Credits adapted from AllMusic.

- Mitch Allan – Producer
- Antonina Armato – Producer
- Aris Archontis – Producer, Mixing
- David Archuleta – Guest vocals
- The Collective – Producer
- Corbin Bleu – Guest vocals
- Arama Brown – Producer
- Miley Cyrus – Vocals
- Kara DioGuardi – Producer
- Andy Dodd – Producer, Mixing
- Dreamlab – Producer
- Anthony Focx – Engineer, Mixing
- Alana da Fonseca – Producer
- Marti Frederiksen – Producer, Engineer, Mixing
- Toby Gad – Producer, Mixing
- Steve Gerdes – Art Direction
- Matthew Gerrard – Producer, Mixing
- Jason Gleed – Producer
- Justin Gray – Producer
- Paul David Hager – Mixing
- Tim James – Producer
- Jeannie Lurie – Producer
- Fred Maher – Mixing
- Brian Malouf – Mixing
- Mitchel Musso – Vocals
- Chen Neeman – Producer
- Paul Palmer – Mixing
- Eddy Schreyer – Mastering
- Anabel Sinn – Design
- Michael "Smidi" Smith – Producer
- Ali Dee Theodore – Producer
- Steve Vincent – Executive in charge of music
- Adam Watts – Producer, Mixing

== Release history ==
Country	Date	Version	Format	Label	Ref.
Germany	July 6, 2009	Standard	CD; digital download	EMI	
Netherlands	July 6, 2009	Standard	CD	Walt Disney	
United Kingdom	July 6, 2009	Standard	CD; digital download	EMI	
New Zealand	July 6, 2009	Standard	CD	Walt Disney; EMI	
United States	July 7, 2009	Standard	CD; digital download	Walt Disney	
Sweden	July 8, 2009	Standard	CD	Walt Disney; Buena Vista; EMI	
Italy	July 10, 2009	Standard	CD	Walt Disney; EMI	
India	August 6, 2009	Standard	CD	Walt Disney	
Japan	July 22, 2009	Standard	CD	Walt Disney	
Brazil	July 26, 2009	Standard	CD	Walt Disney	
Austria	September 4, 2009	Standard	CD; digital download	Walt Disney; EMI	
Japan	October 7, 2009	Deluxe	CD+DVD	Avex	
Austria	September 4, 2009	Deluxe	CD+DVD	Walt Disney; EMI	
Germany	September 4, 2009	Deluxe	CD+DVD	Walt Disney; EMI	
United Kingdom	September 7, 2009	Deluxe	CD+DVD	EMI	
Brazil	October 6, 2009	Deluxe	CD+DVD	Walt Disney	
United States	October 13, 2009	Karaoke Series	CD	Hollywood	
United States	June 24, 2025	Standard	Vinyl	Walt Disney	
