= Face the Music =

Face the Music is an idiom meaning to acquiesce.

Face the Music may also refer to:

== Film and television ==
- Face the Music (film), a 1954 British crime film directed by Terence Fisher
- Face the Music, a 1993 film starring Molly Ringwald and Patrick Dempsey
- Face the Music, a 2000 film featuring Tyler Christopher
- Face the Music (American game show), a 1980–1981 music quiz show
- Face the Music (British game show), a 1967–1984 music quiz show
- Face the Music (New Zealand game show), a 1992–1994 music quiz show
- Bill & Ted Face the Music, the third film of the Bill & Ted franchise (2020)

== Literature ==
- Face the Music, a 1954 novel by Ernest Bornemann, basis for the 1954 film
- Face the Music, a 2014 novel by Greg Anton
- Face the Music, a Hannah Montana television series novelization
- Face the Music: A Life Exposed, a 2014 memoir by Paul Stanley

== Music ==
- Face the Music (music ensemble), a classical youth ensemble from New York City
- Face the Music (musical), a 1932 Broadway musical

=== Albums ===
- Face the Music (Avant album), 2013
- Face the Music (Burning Rain album) or the title song, 2019
- Face the Music (Electric Light Orchestra album), 1975
- Face the Music (George Duke album), 2002
- Face the Music (Melody Club album), 2004
- Face the Music (New Kids on the Block album) or the title song, 1994
- Face the Music (EP), by Marianas Trench, 2013
- Face the Music, by Meg Christian, 1977
- Face the Music, by Sinne Eeg, 2014
- Face the Music, by Nils Lofgren, 2014
- Face the Music, by Rick Moses, 1978

=== Songs ===
- "Face the Music", by Conjure One from Extraordinary Ways, 2005
- "Face the Music", by Crazy Town from The Gift of Game, 1999
- "Face the Music", by Louis Tomlinson from Faith in the Future, 2022
- "Face the Music", by Wyld Stallyns from the film Bill & Ted Face the Music, 2020

== See also ==
- Facing the Music (disambiguation)
