= Facing the Music =

Facing the Music may refer to:

- Facing the Music (1933 film), a British musical
- Facing the Music (1941 film), a British comedy
- Facing the Music (2001 film), an Australian documentary
- Facing the Music (TV series), a 1998 Singaporean television series
- Facing the Music, a 1973 autobiography by Henri Temianka
- Facing the Music, a 1988 short-story collection by Larry Brown
- Facing the Music, a 2014 memoir by Jennifer Knapp

== See also ==
- Face the Music (disambiguation)
