= Let's Get Crazy (Hannah Montana song) =

Single by Hannah Montana

from the album Hannah Montana: The Movie
- Released: May 29, 2009
- Recorded: 2008
- Genre: Dance-rock
- Length: 2:35
- Label: Walt Disney
- Songwriters: Colleen Fitzpatrick; Michael Kotch; Dave Derby; Michael "Smidi" Smith; Stefanie Ridel; Mim Nervo; Liv Nervo
- Producers: The Collective; Smidi

Miley Cyrus singles chronology
"Make Some Noise" (2007)	"Let's Get Crazy" (2009)	"Supergirl" (2009)

"Let's Get Crazy" is a song by fictional character Hannah Montana, recorded by American singer and actress Miley Cyrus for the soundtrack to the film Hannah Montana: The Movie (2009). It was released to by Walt Disney Records on May 29, 2009, as the second and final single from the soundtrack album. The song is also included on the Hannah Montana 3 soundtrack. A karaoke version is available in Disney's Karaoke Series: Hannah Montana 3. The song is musically dance-rock based. Lyrically, the track speaks about having fun and cutting loose.

The song received critical success and garnered average commercial outcomes for Cyrus in several countries, compared to those of her previous efforts as Montana. This includes Canada and the United States. The song reached its highest international peak in the Canadian Hot 100, at number twenty-six. It therefore became Cyrus' highest charting song in Canada, as Montana. The song never received an official music video, but three promotional music videos were, of which two aired on Disney Channel. Cyrus promoted the song through several venues, including a performance on her second headlining tour, the Wonder World Tour.

== Background ==
"Let's Get Crazy" (2009)
A sample of Hannah Montana's "Let's Get Crazy." It is a dance-rock song that was written by a number of professional songwriters.

The song is associated with dance-rock with a slight country twang. Electric guitars and synths are also used. Near the start, the song begins to make a beat of paparazzi's flashbulbs. It is set in common time with a moderated tempo of 120 beats per minute. The song is written in the key of A minor. Cyrus' vocals span two octaves, from A_{3} to C_{5}. The song has the following chord progression, A5—C5—D5.

The song was written by Colleen Fitzpatrick known as Vitamin C, Michael Kotch, Dave Derby, Michael “Smidi” Smith, Stefanie Ridel, Mim Nervo and Liv Nervo. The song's lyrics center around a party and having fun, once referencing to leading a double life with, "You see me on the cover of your magazines, things are always different than the way they seem."

== Critical reception ==
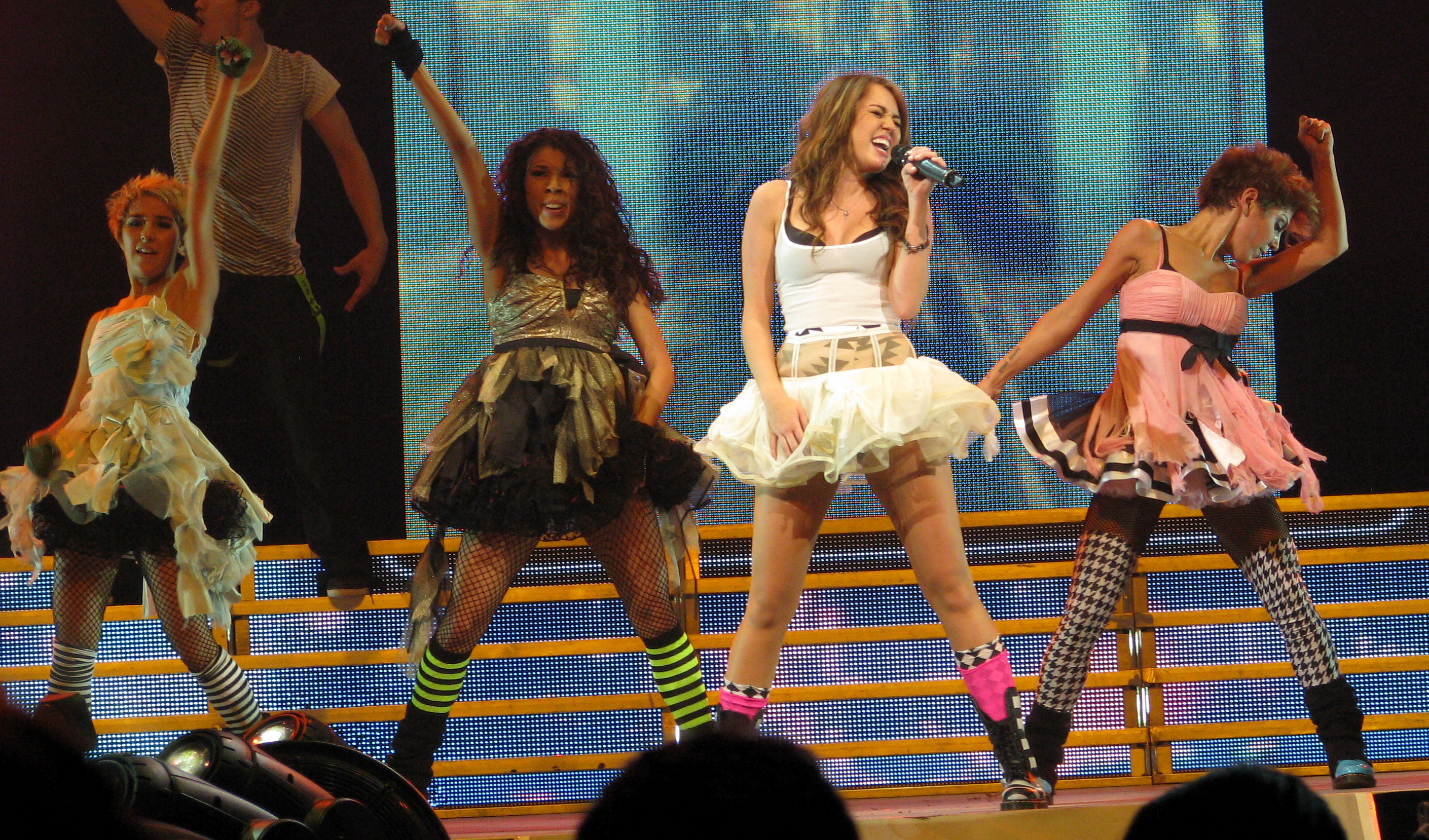
Cyrus and her background dancers performing "Let's Get Crazy" in the Wonder World Tour (2009).

The song received generally positive reviews from critics. Warren Truitt of About.com stated "Let's Get Crazy" was a mirror of Gwen Stefani's musical style. Allmusic reviewer Heather Phares described the song negatively, as a "fizzy caricature of pop", drawing away from the original musical influences by Britney Spears, Christina Aguilera, and Avril Lavigne. Leah Greenblatt of Entertainment Weekly stated that the song was a "demographic" because of it is "electric guitar-heavy confection". Owen Gleiberman, also from Entertainment Weekly drew attention to the line "Everyone can rock out like a superstar!", saying it was "her mantra". Gleiberman added that the song a "freeze-dried [version of] Avril Lavigne". When reviewing Cyrus' Wonder World Tour, Jim Harrington, writing for The Oakland Tribune, described "Let's Get Crazy" as "fun".

== Chart performance ==
The song received mediocre airplay due to it not being released for mainstream radio and only Radio Disney. However, the song debuted at number 33 on Digital Songs which led to it making into the Billboard Hot 100, for the week ending April 11, 2009. The song debuted and peaked at number 57 in the Hot 100 and spent a total of three non-consecutive weeks on the chart. On the same week, the song debuted and peaked at number 26 in the Canadian Hot 100 due to its number 11 position on Canadian Digital Song Sales, becoming Cyrus' highest charting effort in Canada credited to Hannah Montana. The song then ascended and descended several times until falling off the chart for the week ending May 9.

== Music video ==
Cyrus as Hannah Montana at Lily Truscott's Sweet sixteen in the "Let's Get Crazy" promotional music video, an excerpt from Hannah Montana: The Movie.

The song's first promotional music video, directed by Peter Chelsom, is an excerpt from Hannah Montana: The Movie that was premiered on Disney Channel on January 19, 2009.

The video begins with Montana entering Lilly Truscott's, portrayed by Emily Osment, Sweet sixteen at the Santa Monica Pier. Montana is attempting to explain the scenario to Osment's character, saying, "I'll make it up to you, I promise." Then Truscott (Osment) says, "You will never make this up to me." Montana is being overwhelmed by fans, which proceed to lift her to a stage and perform the song. Throughout most of the video Cyrus' character performs the song with background dancers, a band, and Steve Rushton on the electric guitar. In the conclusion, Rico Suave, portrayed by Moises Arias, emerges from a massive birthday cake that explodes on the crowd.

A second promotional music video for "Let's Get Crazy" was filmed as promotion for the soundtrack. The video was released in March 2009 on Disney.com and features Cyrus singing in a recording studio. It was a part of a series of promotional videos entitled The Miley Sessions. The song was also featured in the theatrical trailer of the film.

== Live performances ==
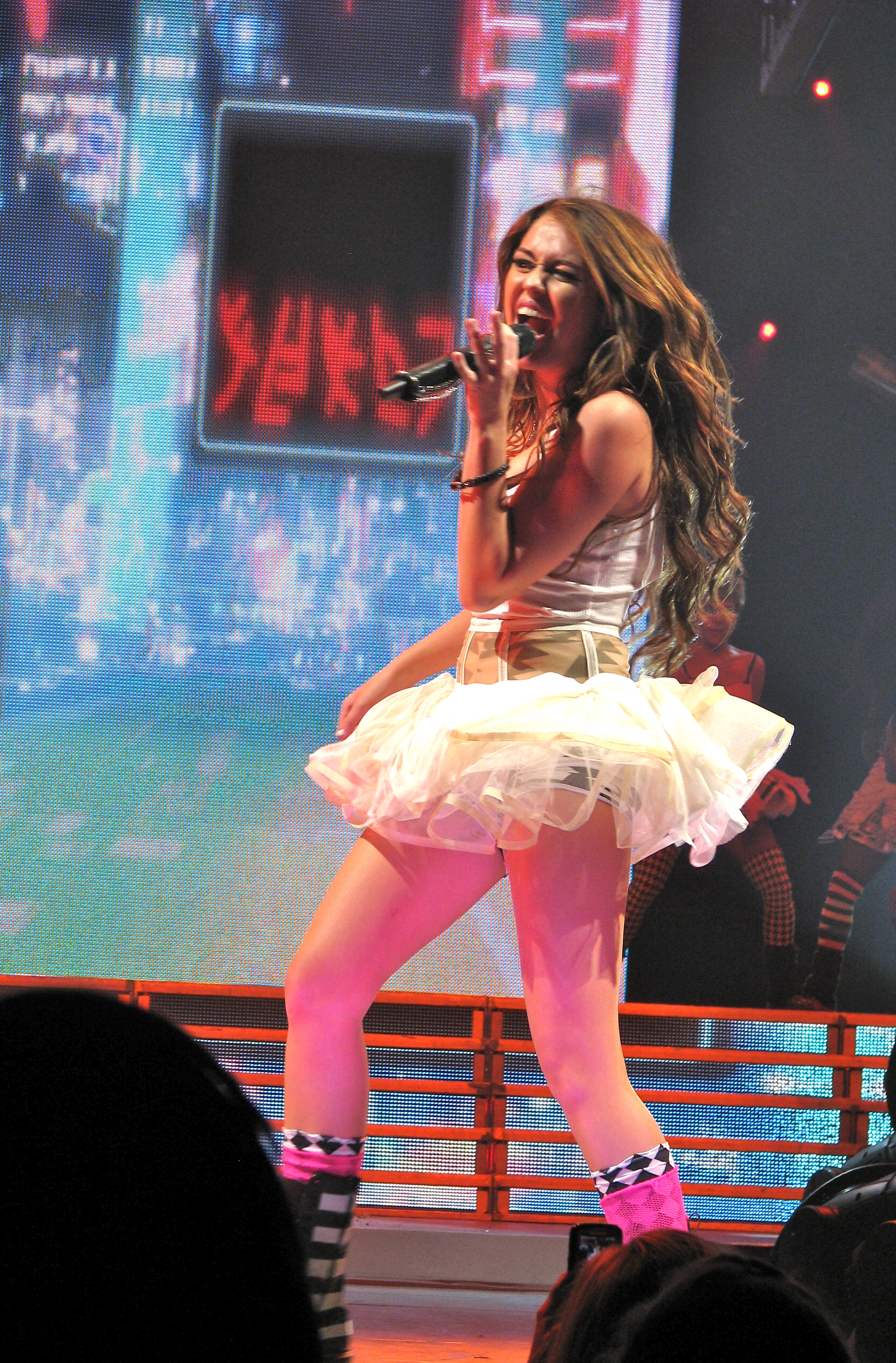
Cyrus performing "Let's Get Crazy" in the Wonder World Tour.

Cyrus, dressed as Montana, premiered "Let's Get Crazy", along with eight other songs, at the concert taping for the third season of Hannah Montana, which was set on October 10, 2008 in Irvine, California at the Verizon Wireless Amphitheatre. The performance began with Montana, in a T-shirt with a pink star, zebra-patterned skirt, tennis shoes and metallic jacket, coming out from behind a giant mirror ball. She then roamed the stage singing the number. The performance was later premiered on July 1, 2009 on Disney Channel to promote Hannah Montana 3.

Proceeded by "Fly on the Wall" and succeeded by "Hoedown Throwdown", "Let's Get Crazy" is one of the songs on the set list of Cyrus' second headlining concert tour, the Wonder World Tour. The song is one of two Hannah Montana songs that she performed as herself. The performance featured Cyrus wearing white tutu-like dress and an Asian culture-themed video playing on a couple of overhead screens.

== Charts ==
Chart performance
Chart (2009–2010)	Peak position
Canada Hot 100 (Billboard)	26
UK Singles (OCC)	115
US Billboard Hot 100	57
US Kid Digital Song Sales (Billboard)	7

== Certification ==
Region	Certification	Certified units/sales
United States (RIAA)	Gold	500,000^{‡}
^{‡} Sales+streaming figures based on certification alone.
