= I Wanna Know You =

Promotional single by Hannah Montana and David Archuleta

from the album Hannah Montana 3
- Released: May 2, 2009
- Genre: Bubblegum pop; teen pop
- Length: 2:46
- Label: Walt Disney
- Songwriters: Jeannie Lurie; Aris Archontis; Chen Neeman
- Producers: Archontis; Lurie; Neeman

"I Wanna Know You" is a song by fictional character Hannah Montana, recorded by American singer and actress Miley Cyrus with David Archuleta for the soundtrack album Hannah Montana 3 (2009), which accompanied the third season of the Disney Channel series Hannah Montana. The song was released as a promotional single from the soundtrack album on May 2, 2009.

== Background ==
The song was originally recorded as a solo by Miley Cyrus (as Hannah Montana) for the first season of the Disney Channel original series Hannah Montana. The song was then recorded as a duet between Montana and Archuleta in order to correspond with his guest appearance on the show, in which the song was used in the episode. Both versions of the song are featured on the show's third soundtrack, Hannah Montana 3.

== Chart performance ==
The song did not garner success until post-release of Hannah Montana 3. The song peaked at number 74 on the Billboard Hot 100.

=== Charts ===
Chart (2009)	Peak position
U.S. Billboard Hot 100	74

== Release history ==
Region	Date	Label	Formats
United States	May 2, 2009	Walt Disney Records	Radio Disney
United States	July 7, 2009	Walt Disney Records	Digital Download

== Credits and personnel ==
- Vocals – Miley Cyrus, David Archuleta
- Writer – Jeannie Lurie, Aris Archontis, Chen Neeman
- Producer – Archontis, Lurie, Neeman
- Mixer – Archontis
