= Supergirl (Hannah Montana song) =

Single by Hannah Montana

from the album Hannah Montana 3
- B-side: "Every Part of Me"
- Released: July 7, 2009
- Recorded: 2009
- Genre: Dance-rock
- Length: 2:55
- Label: Walt Disney
- Songwriters: Kara DioGuardi; Daniel James
- Producer: Dreamlab

Miley Cyrus singles chronology
"Let's Get Crazy" (2009)	"Supergirl" (2009)	"Ice Cream Freeze (Let's Chill)" (2009)

"Supergirl" is a song by fictional character Hannah Montana, recorded by American singer and actress Miley Cyrus for the soundtrack album Hannah Montana 3 (2009), which accompanied the third season of the Disney Channel series Hannah Montana. It was released by Walt Disney Records on July 7, 2009, as the lead single from the soundtrack album. The song was written by Kara DioGuardi, in collaboration with Daniel James, and produced by Dreamlab. A karaoke version is available on Disney's Karaoke Series: Hannah Montana 3. The song is characterized by dance-rock elements in its musical composition and contains lyrics regarding the lows of pop stardom.

The song received average to mixed reception from contemporary critics and garnered average commercial outcomes for Cyrus in several countries, compared to those of her previous efforts as Montana. In the United States, it peaked at number five on Billboard's Bubbling Under Hot 100 Singles (Hot 100–105). It marked Cyrus' first entry as Montana in Austria; it peaked at number fifty-eight on the Austrian Singles Chart. A music video for "Supergirl" was released, taken from footage of a concert performance.

== Background ==
"Supergirl" was co-written by Kara DioGuardi, who composed a total of four songs on Hannah Montana 3, and Dan James. A karaoke version is available on Disney's Karaoke Series: Hannah Montana 3. "Supergirl" leaked on the internet in November 2008, along with six other songs from Hannah Montana 3. The song first premiered on Radio Disney on July 2, 2009, in order to promote the soundtrack and was afterward released as the second and final single from Hannah Montana 3 in 2009.

== Composition ==
"Supergirl" (2008)
A 30 second sample of Hannah Montana's "Supergirl", a song about the lows of superstardom.

"Supergirl" is pop song with a length of two minutes and fifty-five seconds. According to Allmusic, the song contains dance-pop and teen pop elements in its music, while Mikael Wood of Entertainment Weekly cited rock music as its main influence. Peter Larsen of the Orange County Register described the track as a bouncy dance-pop number also. The song is set in common time and has a moderate rock tempo. It is written in the key of C major and it follows the chord progression Am11–Fmaj7–C–G. Warren Truitt of About.com interpreted the lyrics of "Supergirl" to be about the lows of pop stardom. Larsen believed the line "You just wanna be like me" was a representation of Cyrus, "a super duper girl".

== Reception ==
=== Critical reception ===
"Supergirl" received average to mixed reception from contemporary critics. Heather Phares of Allmusic said, "That feeling of familiarity extends to the songs that haven't appeared anywhere else. Whether it's the happy side of Hannah ('It's All Right Here,' 'Supergirl') [...] they sound very much like what came before them." Warren Truitt of About.com agreed but stated, "[The song] may be a little cookie-cutter, but at least the songwriters realize who their audience is and they deliver the goods". Mikael Wood of Entertainment Weekly compared the song's style to that of Kelly Clarkson. While reviewing a concert before the release of the soundtrack, Peter Larsen of the Orange County Register predicted it would be released as a single and become popular with children, yet "saturate [parents'] ears for a month or two".

=== Chart performance ===
On the week ending July 25, 2009, in the United States, "Supergirl" debuted at number five on Billboard's Bubbling Under Hot 100 Chart (Hot 100–105) upon Hannah Montana 3's release. The song dropped from the Bubbling Under Hot 100 Singles Chart in the following week. On the week ending September 11, 2009, "Supergirl" debuted and peaked at number fifty-eight on the Austrian Singles Chart, marking Cyrus' first appearance in the country as Montana; it also dropped from the Austrian Singles Chart after one week. Along with its B-side, "Every Part of Me", the song peaked at number forty-two on the German Singles Chart.

== Live performances ==
Cyrus as Montana performed the song at the concert taping for the third season of Hannah Montana; the performance is used as the music video for "Supergirl".

On October 10, 2008, Cyrus, dressed as Montana, premiered "Supergirl", along with eight other songs, at the concert taping for the third season of Hannah Montana, which was set on October 10 in Irvine, California at the Verizon Wireless Amphitheatre. The performance began with Montana, dressed in a white and pink tie-dye tee shirt, white pants, pink leather jacket, and large sunglasses. The performance begins with Cyrus sitting in a bench, facing a mirror, as backup dancers apply makeup on her and attend her. She stands up and roams around the stage to sing afterward. Peter Larsen of the Orange County Register called it one of "hits of the night". The performance was later premiered as the song's music video on July 2, 2009, on Disney Channel to promote Hannah Montana 3.

== Track listings ==
- U.S. / EU Vinyl CD Single / Digital Download
1. "Supergirl" (Album Version) – 2:55
2. "Supergirl" (Instrumental) – 2:55
3. "Every Part of Me" – 3:30
- EU 2-Track CD Single
1. "Supergirl" (Album Version) – 2:55
2. "Every Part of Me" – 3:30

== Charts ==
Chart performance
Chart (2008)	Peak position
Austria (Ö3 Austria Top 40)	58
Germany (GfK)	42
US Bubbling Under Hot 100 (Billboard)	5
