= Hannah Montana: The Movie (soundtrack) =

2009 soundtrack album by Hannah Montana

Soundtrack album by Hannah Montana and various artists
- Released: March 24, 2009
- Recorded: 2008
- Genres: Pop; country
- Length: 61:20
- Label: Walt Disney Records
- Producers: Adam Anders; Glen Ballard; Mark Bright; Nathan Chapman; the Collective; Scott Cutler; Rascal Flatts; Alana da Fonseca; Matthew Gerrard; Jason Gleed; Dann Huff; Mitchell Lieb; Kai Mckenzie; Miles Millar; Anne Preven; Raz; Steve Rushton; John Shanks; Alan Silvestri; Smidi; Billy Ray Cyrus; Taylor Swift; Ali Dee Theodore

Miley Cyrus chronology
Hannah Montana: Hits Remixed (2008)	Hannah Montana: The Movie (2009)	Hannah Montana 3 (2009)

Singles from Hannah Montana: The Movie
- 1. "The Climb" Released: March 5, 2009; 2. "Let's Get Crazy" Released: May 29, 2009

Hannah Montana: The Movie is the soundtrack album to the 2009 film of the same name, based on the Disney Channel series Hannah Montana. It was released by Walt Disney Records on March 24, 2009. The album features songs performed by American singer and actress Miley Cyrus, both in character as the fictional singer Hannah Montana and under her own name. It also features appearances from American singers Billy Ray Cyrus, Taylor Swift, Rascal Flatts and English singer Steve Rushton. The lyrics on the album primarily discuss the film's themes of fame, family and love. Musically, the album merges heavy influences from pop and country.

All of the songs in the album were approved by the film's director Peter Chelsom. He felt the film needed music that was tightly woven into the film's plot and the character's background. Several producers worked on the album, mainly John Shanks and Matthew Gerrard. Shanks was more involved with Cyrus than the other artists. Meanwhile, Gerrard produced Cyrus' songs as Montana; he previously wrote her 2006 song "The Best of Both Worlds" which received a remix that is featured as the album's closing track.

The album was met with positive reviews from music critics. Cyrus was praised for being natural and reflected while performing as herself. They also complimented Taylor Swift's performance and debated if she or Cyrus were more dominant. The soundtrack received a nomination for a 2009 American Music Award for Favorite Soundtrack, but lost to the Twilight soundtrack. Hannah Montana: The Movie reached the top ten in many nations, and topped charts in countries such as Austria, Canada, and New Zealand. In the United States, it peaked at number one on the Billboard 200 and the Billboard Top Country Albums chart. By May 2009, the Recording Industry Association of America (RIAA) certified the album platinum. The album was promoted through exclusive releases to Radio Disney and live performances at numerous venues. Cyrus performed four songs from the album on her first worldwide concert tour.

"The Climb", performed by Cyrus, was released as the lead single on March 5, 2009. "Hoedown Throwdown" served as a promotional single released on March 10, 2009. "Let's Get Crazy", performed by Montana, was released in Italy as the album's second and final single on May 29, 2009.

== Writing and development ==
Most of the songs on the soundtrack were offered to Peter Chelsom, the film's director, for inclusion on the film. Producer Alfred Gough said, "Peter Chelsom describes the Stewart family [Cyrus' character's family in the film] as a bilingual family whose second language is music, and that's very true in this movie." Chelsom says the film's numerous songs are tightly woven into the fabric of the story and the characters, which is why he believes the film will feel like a musical without being one. "We continuously dance very close to the convention of a musical but are more integrated. Songs are going to sit within the film, not apart from the film. At times, you won't notice the music is happening; it'll just move the story along."

In regards to Cyrus' songs, Chelsom said, "We realized this was an opportunity to move forward with the music, to update it and make it more sophisticated, to move with Miley’s age. I’ve never had a better musical experience on any film." Cyrus noted that most of the songs included on the soundtrack were inspired by the return of Cyrus' character, Miley Stewart/Hannah Montana, to her Nashville roots. She explained, "The soundtrack is all about Nashville, and that's where I'm from, that's my roots. I think that's a lot of the reason I am who I am." Cyrus co-wrote "Don't Walk Away" because it was to be included on her own studio album Breakout (2008). "Hoedown Throwdown", a song in which Cyrus calls dance steps, took much time to write. It became an ongoing collaboration between Chelsom, Cyrus, choreographer Jamal Sims, and the song's writers, Adam Anders and Nikki Hasman.

Jessi Alexander said she was inspired to write "The Climb" while driving to the home of her songwriting partner, Jon Mabe. Once she arrived, they decided to write a song about overcoming obstacles. Alexander referred to the process as a form of "therapy". It had initially been passed over by several artists until Chelsom chose it and offered it to Cyrus. Under the name Hannah Montana, Cyrus performs the song "Let's Do This", which was originally written and recorded by American country singer Adam Tefteller. The last track is a remixed version of Cyrus' hit "The Best of Both Worlds" (2006). The song is used as the theme song of the Disney Channel television show Hannah Montana, the basis of the film, and was originally released on the television series' first soundtrack.

Several other artists appear on the soundtrack. Billy Ray Cyrus' song on the album, "Back to Tennessee", is the title track of his eleventh studio album. Written by Cyrus, Tamara Dunn and Matthew Wilder, the song reflects the desire of both Cyrus and his character in the film, Robbie Ray Stewart, to return to their roots. Disney artist Steve Rushton sings "Everything I Want" and "Game Over". Rascal Flatts perform acoustic versions of previous efforts originally released on Feels Like Today (2004) and Me and My Gang (2006). When approached about participating in the soundtrack, Taylor Swift sent her ballad "Crazier" because it "was perfect to fall in love to". Taylor Swift also wrote the opening track "You'll Always Find Your Way Back Home" with Martin Johnson of Boys Like Girls.

== Music structure and lyrics ==
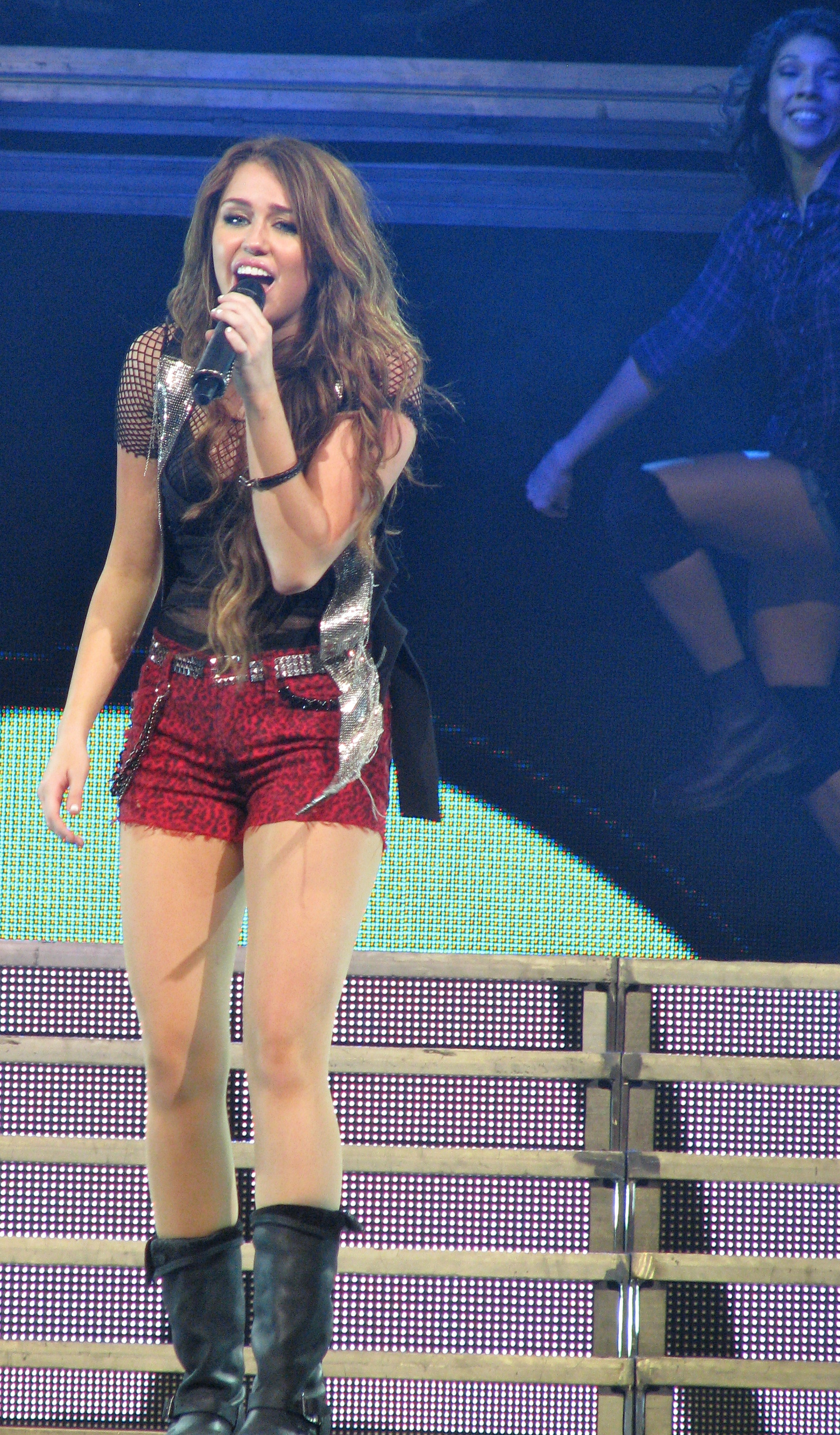
Cyrus performing "Spotlight" in the Wonder World Tour. The song is one of seven on the album credited to her television character Hannah Montana.

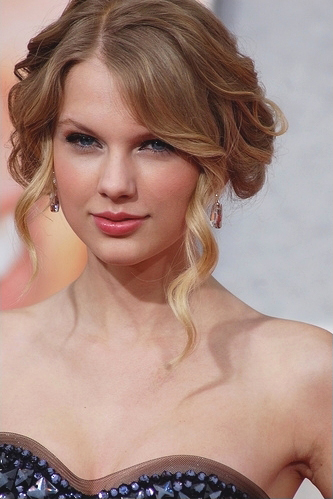
Taylor Swift at the 2009 premiere of Hannah Montana: The Movie. She had a cameo appearance in the film and wrote two songs for its soundtrack.

Musically, it is a pop and country album. According to About.com, each of Cyrus' songs incorporate her "husky twang". The up-tempo songs are mainly performed by Hannah Montana and ballads are kept at a minimum. Songs like "You'll Always Find Your Way Back Home", "Let's Get Crazy", and "Spotlight" are the most true to pop. "Let's Get Crazy" carries a groove and creates a beat from paparazzi flashbulbs. Cyrus' songs are more mid-tempo. "Hoedown Throwdown" is an instructional dance song that mixes country and hip-hop. "The Climb" has solid, clear vocals and is a standard-issue power ballad that places piano solos between chiming electric guitars. "Crazier" is a waltzing ballad that has Taylor Swift in relaxed soprano vocals.

Lyrically, the album explores a variety of concepts. With the exception of "You'll Always Find Your Way Back Home", which speaks about staying grounded and relying on family, Hannah Montana's songs describe the "glitzy-world" and privileges of a celebrity. "Let's Get Crazy" centers on having fun at a party. "The Good Life" is a "sugar-coated celebration of Gucci handbags and Prada shoes". "The Best of Both Worlds" explicitly alludes to Miley Stewart's double life as Hannah Montana: regular adolescent that moved from Nashville, Tennessee to Malibu, California by day and pop star by night. In the song, Hannah Montana talks about the privileges and advantages that are faced in leading in two lives with references to Orlando Bloom, concerts, friendship and film premieres. The songs Cyrus performs as herself are more reflective, personal, and sentimental. "Hoedown Throwdown" is a tribute to down-home fun. "The Climb" describes life as a difficult but rewarding journey. "Butterfly Fly Away" is a father-daughter duet by Miley and Billy Ray Cyrus about the coming of age. In "Back to Tennessee" Billy Ray Cyrus laments leaving Tennessee. Country group Rascal Flatts provide an acoustic version of "Backwards" and "Bless the Broken Road" with Williamson County Youth Orchestra.

== Singles ==
"The Climb" was released as the lead single from the album on February 21, 2009, through digital distribution. The song was critically appreciated for its lyrical content and Cyrus' strong vocals. It achieved commercial success and reached the top ten on charts in the United States, Australia, Canada, and Norway, as well as reaching the top twenty in many other countries. In the United States, the song topped Hot Adult Contemporary Tracks for fifteen consecutive weeks.

"Let's Get Crazy" was released as the second single from the album on May 29, 2009.

Promotional singles

After the release of the soundtrack, Disney sent promotional songs.

"Hoedown Throwdown" was released as a Radio Disney Exclusive single on March 10, 2009. The song managed to make commercial success by reaching the top ten of the Irish Singles Chart and top twenty in numerous regions.

"Crazier" was premiered on Radio Disney and Disney Channel, the latter promoting the home release of the film. The song charting at number seventeen on the Billboard Hot 100, sixty-four in the Australian Singles Chart, sixty-seven in the Canadian Hot 100, and one-hundred on the UK Singles Chart.

Other charted songs

"You'll Always Find Your Way Back Home" peaked at number seventy-six on the Canadian Hot and at number eighty-one in the Billboard Hot 100.

== Promotion ==
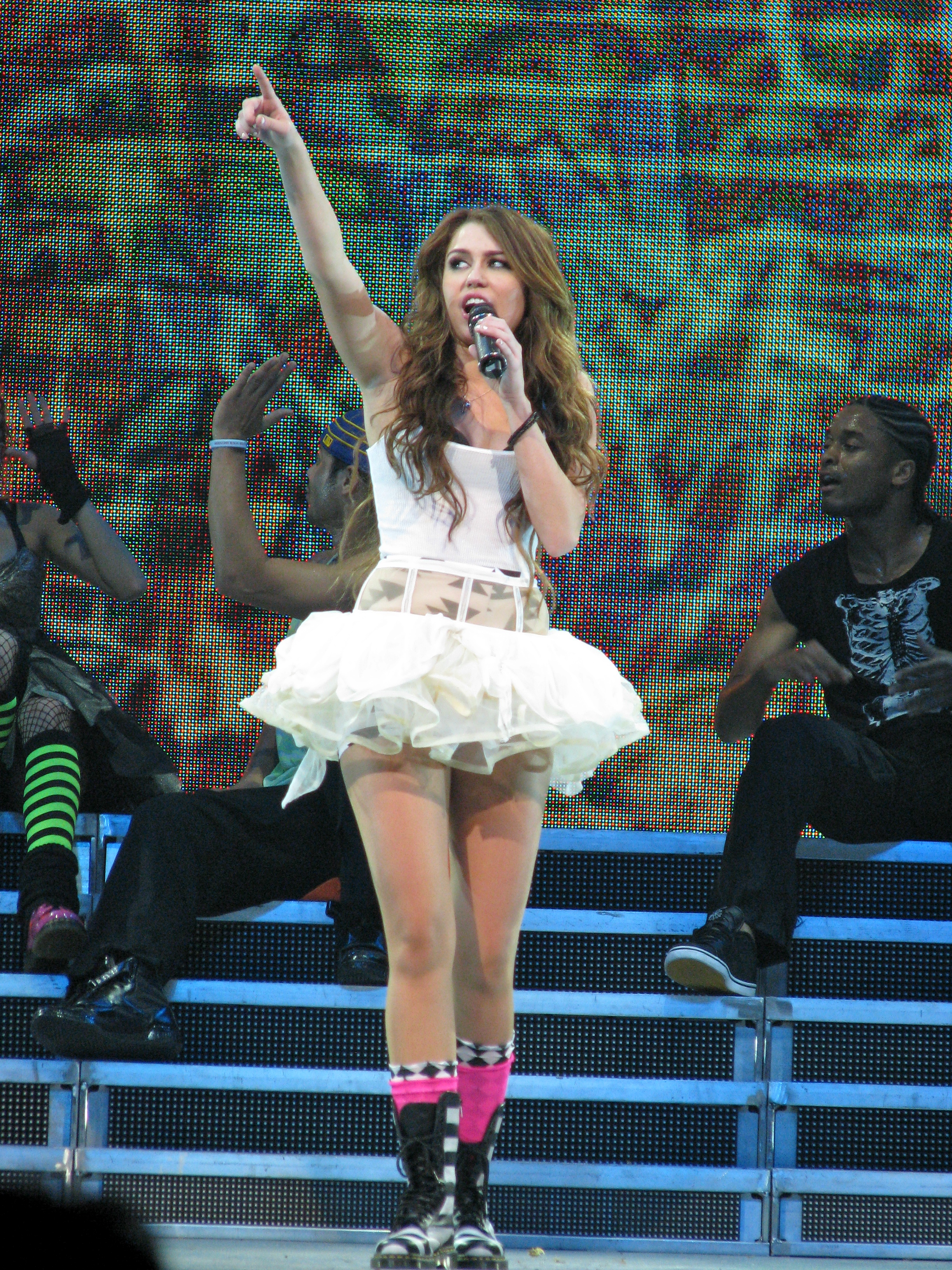
Cyrus performing "Hoedown Throwdown" in the Wonder World Tour. It took much time to write due to it being an instructional dance song. The song became a top ten hit in Ireland.

On October 10, 2008, Cyrus performed "Let's Get Crazy", "Let's Do This", and the 2009 Movie Mix of "The Best of Both Worlds" as Hannah Montana for the taping of third season of Hannah Montana at the Verizon Wireless Amphitheatre in Irvine California. On January 19, 2009, Cyrus premiered "The Climb" at the Kids' Inaugural: "We Are the Future" event in celebration of Barack Obama's inauguration. Cyrus and her father performed in London in an Apple Store; the taped performance was sold exclusively by the United Kingdom iTunes Store as an extended play titled iTunes: Live from London. Cyrus has performed songs from the album on the Academy of Country Music, The Tonight Show with Jay Leno, American Idol, Good Morning America, Live with Regis and Kelly, the AOL Sessions, the twentieth annual A Time for Heroes Celebrity Carnival, Today, and the first D23 Expo.

Promotional songs from Hannah Montana: The Movie were premiered on Radio Disney and Disney Channel. "Let's Do This" was first to premiere on Radio Disney and Disney Channel on December 13, 2008, the video being taken from the taping in Irvine. Due to digital downloads, the song peaked at number twenty-three on the Bubbling Under Hot 100 Singles Chart (Hot 100 – 123); the song charted in the Hot Canadian Digital Singles at number sixty-nine, but failed to reach the Canadian Hot 100. "Let's Get Crazy" was then premiered on January 19, 2009. The music video is an excerpt from Hannah Montana: The Movie in which Miley Stewart, portrayed by Cyrus, is forced to enter Lilly Truscott's, portrayed by Emily Osment, Sweet Sixteen as Hannah Montana. The song peaked at number fifty-seven in the Billboard Hot 100 and twenty-six in the Canadian Hot 100, therefore becoming Hannah Montana's highest chart effort in Canada. "Back to Tennessee" was premiered only on Disney Channel with a video that interspersed scenes from the film. The song peaked at number forty-seven on Hot Country Songs.

Radio Disney premiered the entire soundtrack on March 21, 2009, with a rebroadcast the next day. The Miley Sessions, a series of promotional music videos that featured Cyrus singing in a recording studio were released to Disney.com in March 2009. The videos feature Cyrus in a recording studio singing. Disney Channel aired a series of commercial segments entitled Hannah Montana: The Movie Playback, in which Cyrus is in the same setting describing the music of the album. Cyrus also embarked for a five city acoustic radio promo tour that reached over two-hundred-fifty for six days to promote the album. In addition, Cyrus performed four songs from the album on her first worldwide concert tour, the Wonder World Tour.

== Critical reception ==
Professional ratings
Review scores
Source	Rating
About.com	4/5 stars
AllMusic	3.5/5 stars
Entertainment Weekly	B

The album received generally positive reviews from critics. Warren Truitt of About.com described the album as Cyrus' attempt to gradually capture a more mature audience by sharing the album with artists like the Rascal Flatts and Taylor Swift. Truitt also made musical comparisons to Shania Twain in "Dream", Kelly Clarkson in "Don't Walk Away", Avril Lavigne in "The Good Life", and Gwen Stefani in "Spotlight" and "Let's Get Crazy". Heather Phares of AllMusic noted the presence of many drastically different genres makes the album "a little weird". She stated that Cyrus' songs which were performed as herself were "the best songs", and also compared Cyrus to Twain. Phares also noted that Taylor Swift's "Crazier" was "the best song on Hannah Montana: The Movie". Leah Greenblatt of Entertainment Weekly stated, "the distance between tween and twang isn't actually all that far; think of this [...] as a sort of country-lite starter kit for her legion of young Disney-fed fans". In the end, she said Hannah Montana: The Movie was "the Miley show — whether it broadcasts from Nashville or Hollywood", despite appearances by other artists.

== Commercial performance ==
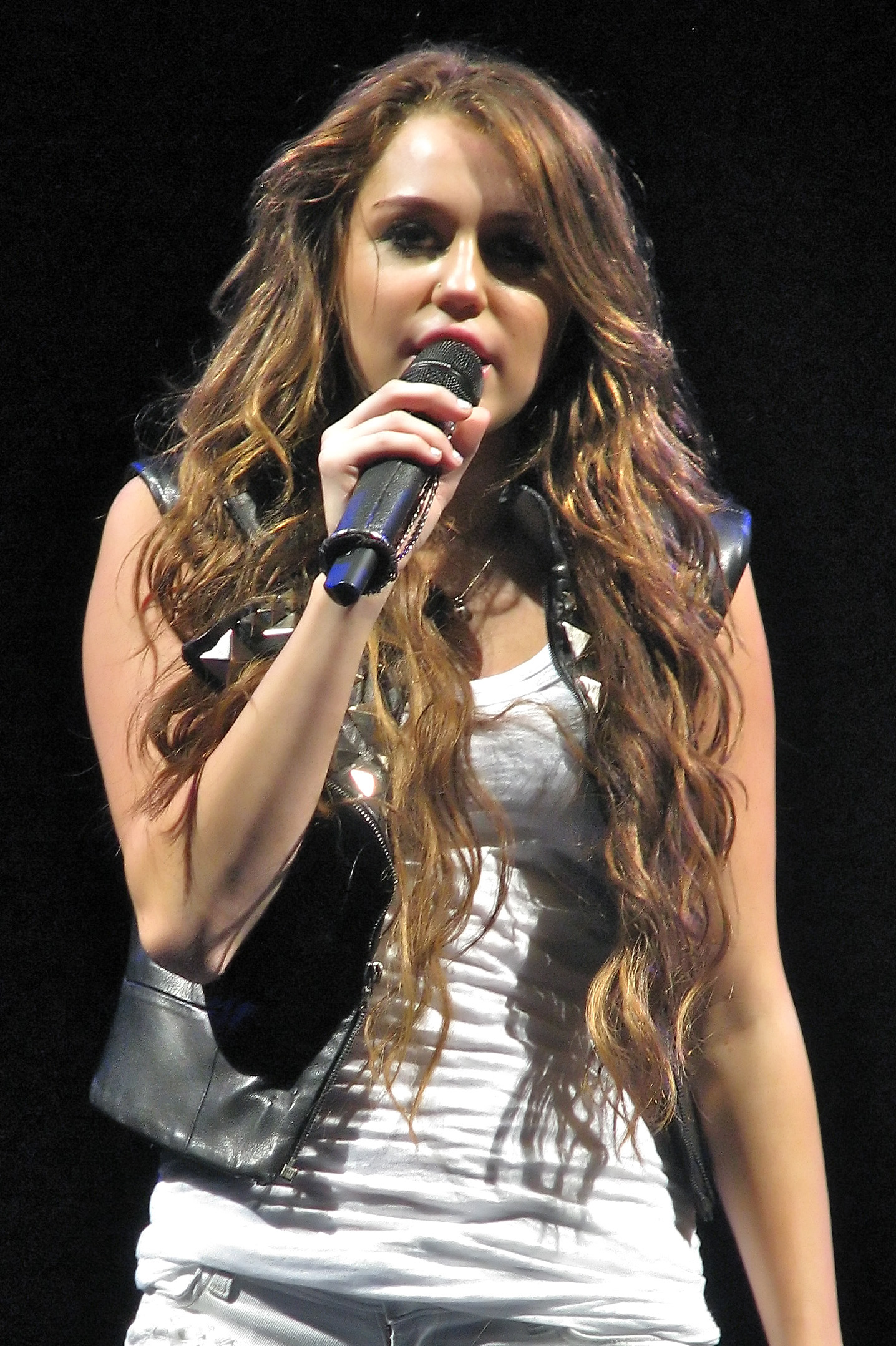
Cyrus performing the album's lead single "The Climb" at the Wonder World Tour. The song talks about remaining optimistic and became a big adult contemporary hit.

Hannah Montana: The Movie debuted on the Billboard 200 at number two with 139,000 copies sold on the issue date April 11, 2009. After four weeks of ascending and descending the chart, the album reached the number one position, becoming the first soundtrack of the year to top the Billboard 200. In its fourth week the album sold 133,000 copies, a decline of 32 percent compared to previous week's haul of 196,000. It also topped Billboard Top Country Albums for nine non-consecutive weeks and Top Soundtracks for nineteen non-consecutive weeks. After two months, the album became certified platinum for shipments of one million copies by the Recording Industry Association of America (RIAA). The album has sold 2,085,000 copies in the US as of April 2014 and 3 million worldwide. In Canada, the album debuted at number two, and peaked at number one for two consecutive weeks.

Hannah Montana: The Movie made its debut in the New Zealand RIANZ Album Chart at number eleven and eventually topped the chart for a week. It was certified platinum by the Recording Industry Association of New Zealand (RIANZ) for the shipment of 15,000 copies. In Australia, the soundtrack peaked at number six and was certified platinum by the Australian Recording Industry Association (ARIA), selling more than 70,000 copies. In Spain, the album debuted at number eighteen and peaked at the top spot for four weeks. The album was later certified platinum by the Productores de Música de España for the shipment of 80,000 copies. In Austria, the soundtrack peaked at number one for one week and was eventually certified gold for sales above 10,000. Hannah Montana: The Movie also topped the Portuguese chart and reached the top twenty of charts in Belgium, Denmark, Mexico, Norway, Poland, Sweden, and Switzerland.

== Awards and accolades ==
Hannah Montana: The Movie was nominated for "Choice Music: Album Soundtrack" and "Favorite Soundtrack" at the Teen Choice Awards and 2009 American Music Awards but lost to the Twilight soundtrack, respectively. Five of the songs, "Back to Tennessee", "Butterfly Fly Away", "Don't Walk Away", "Hoedown Throwdown", and "You'll Always Find Your Way Back Home" were included on the short list for the Academy Award for Best Original Song at the 82nd Annual Academy Awards.

== Track listing ==
Hannah Montana: The Movie track listing
No.	Title	Writer(s)	Performer(s)	Length
1.	"You'll Always Find Your Way Back Home"	Taylor Swift; Martin Johnson	Hannah Montana	3:44
2.	"Let's Get Crazy"	Colleen Fitzpatrick; Michael Kotch; Dave Derby; Michael "Smidi" Smith; Stefanie Ridel; Mim Nervo; Liv Nervo	Hannah Montana	2:35
3.	"The Good Life"	Matthew Gerrard; Bridget Benenate	Hannah Montana	2:59
4.	"Everything I Want"	Steve Rushton	Steve Rushton	3:53
5.	"Don't Walk Away"	Miley Cyrus; John Shanks; Hillary Lindsey	Miley Cyrus	2:48
6.	"Hoedown Throwdown"	Adam Anders; Nikki Hassman	Miley Cyrus	3:02
7.	"Dream"	Shanks; Kara DioGuardi	Miley Cyrus	3:23
8.	"The Climb"	Jessi Alexander; Jon Mabe	Miley Cyrus	3:55
9.	"Butterfly Fly Away"	Glen Ballard; Alan Silvestri	Miley Cyrus; Billy Ray Cyrus	3:10
10.	"Backwards" (Acoustic)	Marcel; Tony Mullins	Rascal Flatts	3:25
11.	"Back to Tennessee"	Billy Ray Cyrus; Tamara Dunn; Matthew Wilder	Billy Ray Cyrus	4:12
12.	"Crazier"	Taylor Swift; Robert Ellis Orrall	Taylor Swift	3:12
13.	"Bless the Broken Road" (Acoustic)	Bobby Boyd; Jeff Hanna; Marcus Hummon	Rascal Flatts	3:55
14.	"Let's Do This"	Derek George; Tim Owens; Adam Tefteller; Ali Theodore	Hannah Montana	3:32
15.	"Spotlight"	Scott Cutler; Anne Preven	Hannah Montana	3:07
16.	"Game Over"	Rushton; Antony Westgate; Nigel Clark	Steve Rushton	3:53
17.	"What's Not to Like"	Gerrard; Robbie Nevil	Hannah Montana	3:14
18.	"The Best of Both Worlds: The 2009 Movie Mix"	Gerrard; Nevil	Hannah Montana	3:07
Total length:				61:21

International iTunes Store edition bonus track
No.	Title	Writer(s)	Performer(s)	Length
19.	"The Climb" (Hybrid Pop Mix)	Alexander; Mabe	Miley Cyrus	3:52

== Personnel ==
- Adam Anders – producer, engineer, vocal producer
- Glen Ballard – producer
- Mark Bright – producer
- Scott Campbell – engineer, mixing
- Chad Carlson – engineer
- Peter Chelsom – executive producer
- Desirée Craig Ramos – director
- Scott Cutler – producer
- Billy Ray Cyrus – vocals
- Miley Cyrus – vocals
- Taylor Swift – producer, vocals
- Nathan Chapman – producer
- Rascal Flatts – producer, vocals
- Alana Da Fonseca – producer
- Travis Ference – mixing
- Kaylin Frank – composer
- Steve Gerdes – creative director
- Matthew Gerrard – producer, mixing
- Jason Gleed – producer
- Alfred Gough – executive producer
- Mark Hagen – engineer
- Paul David Hager – mixing
- Nikki Hassman – vocal producer
- Dann Huff – producer
- Glen Lajeski – composer
- Mitchell Leib – producer, executive
- Russ "Russwell" Long – engineer
- Jeremy Luzier – mixing
- Gavin MacKillop – engineer
- Joseph Magee – mixing
- Fred Maher – mixing
- Brian Malouf – mixing
- Steve Marcantonio – mixing
- Kai Mckenzie – producer
- Miles Milalr – producer
- Anne Preven – producer
- Raz – producer
- Jeff Rothschild – engineer, mixing
- Ryan Rubin – supervising editor
- Steve Rushton – producer, vocals
- John Shanks – producer
- Anabel Sinn – design
- Monica "Blackheart" Zierhut – producer

== Charts ==
=== Weekly charts ===
Chart (2009)	Peak position
Australian Albums (ARIA)	6
Austrian Albums (Ö3 Austria)	1
Belgian Albums (Ultratop Flanders)	54
Belgian Albums (Ultratop Wallonia)	18
Brazil Top 10 Albums ABPD	2
Canadian Albums (Billboard)	1
Danish Albums (Hitlisten)	9
European Top 100 Albums	8
Finnish Albums (Suomen virallinen lista)	26
French Albums (SNEP)	32
German Albums (Offizielle Top 100)	6
Hungarian Albums (MAHASZ)	2
Mexican Albums (AMPROFON)	3
New Zealand Albums (RMNZ)	1
Norwegian Albums (VG-lista)	2
Polish Albums Chart	3
Portuguese Albums (AFP)	1
Slovenian Albums (IFPI)	13
Spanish Albums (Promusicae)	1
Swedish Albums (Sverigetopplistan)	9
Swiss Albums (Schweizer Hitparade)	13
UK Compilation Albums (Official Charts)	3
US Billboard 200	1
US Top Country Albums (Billboard)	1
US Soundtrack Albums (Billboard)	1

=== Year-end charts ===
Chart (2009)	Position
Australian Albums (ARIA)	15
Austrian Albums (Ö3 Austria)	14
Canadian Albums (Billboard)	10
Danish Albums (Hitlisten)	77
European Albums (Billboard)	33
German Albums (Offizielle Top 100)	30
Hungarian Albums (MAHASZ)	21
Mexican Albums (Top 100 Mexico)	54
New Zealand Albums (RMNZ)	12
Spanish Albums (PROMUSICAE)	14
Swiss Albums (Schweizer Hitparade)	58
US Billboard 200	5
US Top Country Albums (Billboard)	3
US Soundtrack Albums (Billboard)	2

Chart (2010)	Position
US Billboard 200	107
US Top Country Albums (Billboard)	16
US Soundtrack Albums (Billboard)	10

=== Decade-end charts ===
Chart (2000–2009)	Position
US Soundtrack Albums (Billboard)	14

== Certifications ==
Region	Certification	Certified units/sales
Australia (ARIA)	Platinum	70,000^{^}
Austria (IFPI Austria)	Platinum	20,000^{*}
Brazil (Pro-Música Brasil)	Gold	30,000^{*}
GCC (IFPI Middle East)	Platinum	6,000^{*}
Germany (BVMI)	Gold	100,000^{^}
Ireland (IRMA)	Platinum	15,000^{^}
Mexico (AMPROFON)	Platinum	80,000^{^}
New Zealand (RMNZ)	3× Platinum	45,000^{‡}
Portugal (AFP)	Platinum	20,000^{^}
Spain (Promusicae)	Gold	40,000^{^}
United Kingdom (BPI)	Gold	100,000^{^}
United States (RIAA)	2× Platinum	2,000,000^{^}
^{*} Sales figures based on certification alone.^{^} Shipments figures based on certification alone.^{‡} Sales+streaming figures based on certification alone.
