= Hoedown Throwdown =

Promotional single by Miley Cyrus

from the album Hannah Montana: The Movie
- Released: March 10, 2009
- Genre: Country rap
- Length: 3:01
- Label: Walt Disney
- Songwriters: Adam Anders; Nikki Hassman
- Producers: Adam Anders; Raz

Licensed audio
- "Hoedown Throwdown" on YouTube

"Hoedown Throwdown" is a song performed by recording artist Miley Cyrus. It was released as a promotional single on the iTunes Store from the soundtrack for Hannah Montana: The Movie on March 10, 2009. It was also pressed as a promotional single by EMI Records. A karaoke version is available in the soundtrack's karaoke series. "Hoedown Throwdown" is an instructional dance song with a hybrid of country and hip hop. The choreography was designed by Jamal Sims.

The song received a mixed critical reception, but enjoyed commercial success and became a top twenty hit in various nations including Australia, Canada, Ireland, Norway, the United Kingdom, and the United States. "Hoedown Throwdown" reached its highest international peak in the Irish Singles Chart, at number ten. The single never received an official music video, but an excerpt from Hannah Montana: The Movie was used for promotion. Cyrus incorporated "Hoedown Throwdown" into the set list of her first worldwide concert tour, the Wonder World Tour. The song was not released to radio in the U.S.

== Background ==
"Hoedown Throwdown" was created for the 2009 musical film Hannah Montana: The Movie, in which Cyrus stars as a famous pop star sent to reconnect with her Southern roots and family. The film's director, Peter Chelsom, felt the movie needed a big dance-number, similar to the "Macarena" (1995) or the "Funky Chicken" (1950s). Chelsom knew he wanted a song in which Cyrus' character, Miley Stewart, called dance steps that captured Cyrus' "real silliness physically" and her "great abandon". In addition, Chelsom wanted the song to represent the two worlds of Stewart, the main theme of the film, by "combin[ing] Miley Stewart's L.A. hip-hop/pop style with her country roots". Because the song is an instructional dance song, it became an ongoing collaboration between Chelsom, choreographer Jamal Sims, Cyrus, and the song's songwriters, Adam Anders and Nikki Hasman. According to Chelsom, the collaborators referred to the song by the working title "The Project" "for the longest time" before naming it the "Hoedown Throwdown". The song was also nick-named "Miley's Macarena".

== Music and lyrics ==
"Hoedown Throwdown" (2009)
A sample of Cyrus' "Hoedown Throwdown." It is an instructional dance song that incorporates country and hip-hop styles into line dance.

"Hoedown Throwdown" merges from a hybrid of country and hip hop. It is set in common time with a moderate tempo of 104 beats per minute. "Hoedown Throwdown" is written in the key of E♭ major. Cyrus' vocals span two octaves, from B♭_{3} to F_{5}. The song begins with an intro in which Cyrus repeats "Boom Boom clap, boom di-clap di-clap" four times. This line is reused in the song's outro. AllMusic described the song as a tribute to "down-home family times". Cyrus stated "Hoedown Throwdown" was one of those on the film's soundtrack that "is all about" her Nashville roots and "the reason why [she is who she is]."

== Dance ==
The dance for "Hoedown Throwdown" is heavily influenced by line dancing and merges some hip-hop. A video starring Cyrus and Hannah Montana: The Movie's choreographer Jamal Simms entitled "How to Do the Hoedown Throwdown", premiered on Disney Channel on February 20, 2009. The video features Cyrus and Simms, accompanied by several back-up dancers, in a pink room and sporting workout attire. Throughout the evening, Cyrus and Simms executed and explained each dance move. At the end of the night, Cyrus and Simms put together all of the dance steps at once into a competition entitled "Hoedown Throwdown Showdown". Cyrus explained the dance required "semi-coordinat[ion]". Ann Donahue of Billboard said that she discovered "exactly how Cyrus' legion of preteen female fans is learning the dance: YouTube onscreen, phone to ear, someone on phone offering encouragement amid occasional peals of laughter." She also drew similarities to Billy Ray Cyrus' choreography for "Achy Breaky Heart". Reported by MTV News, the "Hoedown Throwdown," caused a sizable younger audience "jumping on the country bandwagon". In an interview with Just Jared, Cyrus said

"I have all these different kids at events who say, 'Oh yeah, I know the "Hoedown Throwdown" now,' and that's really cool that they're getting to dance to it. In the theaters, I think if they danced to it, it would be kind of cool."

== Critical reception ==
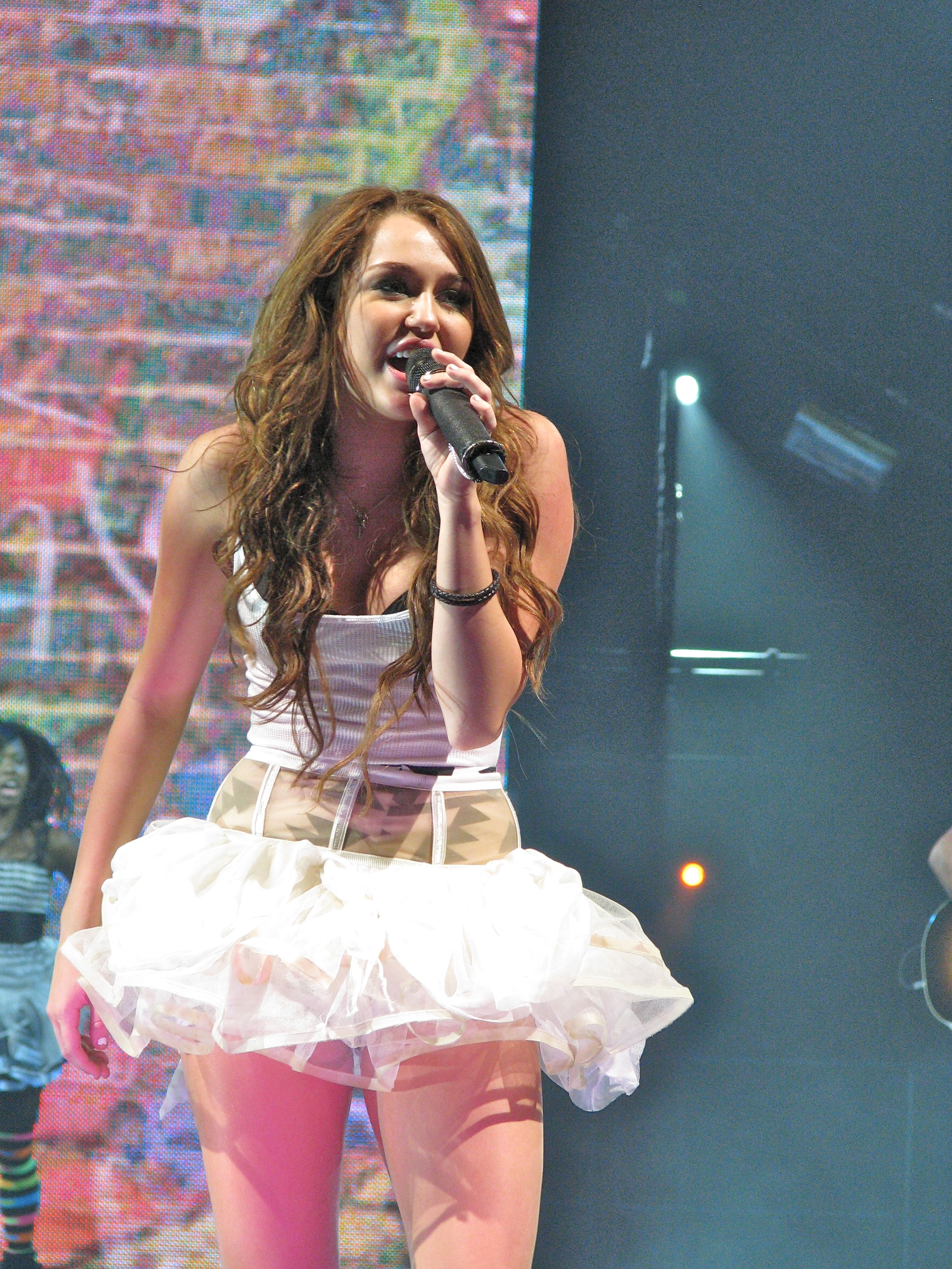
Cyrus performing "Hoedown Throwdown" during the Wonder World Tour.

The song received mixed reviews. Warren Truitt from About.com described the song as Cyrus' "only misstep" in the Hannah Montana: The Movie soundtrack because of its "weird" merge of country and hip-hop "that sound[ed] like Disney's trying a liiittle [sic] bit too hard to cover all genres". Heather Phares of Allmusic stated the song was the exception to Cyrus' usual husky and natural songs. Phares added that "Hoedown Throwdown" was "goofy" and "feels more like a parody of down-home fun than a tribute to it". The Baltimore Sun reviewer Chris Kahltenblach wrote that the song is "catchy as the law allows". Wesley Morris of The Boston Globe praised the "Hoedown Throwdown" was "an epic line dance". Leah Greenblatt of Entertainment Weekly described the song as "deep-fried [...] sort of goofy Hee [sic] Haw". However, Owen Gleiberman, also of Entertainment Weekly, called Cyrus a "professional charmer" and found that "it's hard to resist when she leads a hip-hop hoedown". The Hollywood Reporter reviewer Michael Rechtshaffen wrote that the song was a "misguided attempt at marrying Hannah's contemporary pop/hip-hop sound with the Grand Ole Opry" and that it was "squirm-inducing". Meanwhile, Mary McNamara, writing for the Los Angeles Times, called the "Hoedown Throwdown" one of the few "flashes of inspiration" in Hannah Montana: The Movie and Variety magazine's Lael Lowenstein referred to it as a "pleasing, rousing, toe-tapping, line-dancing hoedown." The song was included on the short list for Best Original Song at the 82nd Academy Awards.

== Chart performance ==
Due to digital sales, the song debuted at number sixty-eight in the Billboard Hot 100 for the week ending March 21, 2009. The song then found new peaks at number forty-six and twenty-eight on the chart, respectively. For the week ending May 2, 2009, "Hoedown Throwdown" peaked at number eighteen on the Billboard Hot 100 due to digital downloads that placed it at number eight on Hot Digital Songs. The song also peaked at number twenty-nine in the canceled Pop 100 chart. As of July 2013, it has sold 1,300,000 copies in the United States. In Canada, the song peaked at number fifteen. In the Australian Singles Chart, the song debuted at number forty and peaked at number twenty after three weeks of finding new peaks. "Hoedown Throwdown" was certified gold by the Australian Recording Industry Association (ARIA) for the sales of over 35,000 digital downloads. "Hoedown Throwdown" debuted and peaked at number forty in the New Zealand Singles Chart.

In the United Kingdom, the song debuted at number sixty-two for the week ending March 18, 2009. It peaked at number eighteen for the week ending May 16, 2009. The song reached its highest international peak in Ireland. It entered the Irish Singles Chart on the week ending May 7, 2009, both debuting and peaking at number ten. In mainland Europe, "Hoedown Throwdown" peaked at number fifty in the European Hot 100 and at number seventeen in the Norwegian Singles Chart. The song also reached charts in Austria, Germany, and Switzerland.

== Music video ==
Cyrus (center) performing "Hoedown Throwdown" in its music video, an excerpt from Hannah Montana: The Movie.

The song's music video, directed by Peter Chelsom, is an excerpt from Hannah Montana: The Movie which premiered on February 16, 2009 on Disney Channel.

The video begins with a black background and blue printed letters that spell "boom". Other words appear, ultimately spelling the phrase "boom, clap, boom dee clap". A quick montage of Hannah Montana and Miley Stewart are played. It then skips to the video's main setting. Cyrus is at a crowded barn, wearing a plaid blouse, jean skirt, and boots, on top of a stage. Blue printed letters that spell the lyrics then make an appearance, as Cyrus attempts to teach the crowd the dance. After the crowd learns the dance routine, scenes of Mitchel Musso, Moises Arias, Vanessa Williams, Tyra Banks, Jason Earles, and Emily Osment doing the "Hoedown Throwdown" are played. When Cyrus' scene reappears she is off the stage and performing with the rest of the crowd. In the conclusion, Cyrus finishes singing onstage and the audience applauds.

== Live performances ==
Cyrus never sang "Hoedown Throwdown" live during televised events, but often performed the dance with the track on playback. On April 3, 2009, Cyrus performed "Hoedown Throwdown" on The Tonight Show with Jay Leno. Cyrus performed the dance on Good Morning America on April 8, 2009. On April 10, 2009, Cyrus danced to the track with some of the movie's castmates on The Tyra Banks Show. Preceded by a performance of "Let's Get Crazy" as herself and succeeded by "These Four Walls", Cyrus performed "Hoedown Throwdown" as part of her set list in her first worldwide concert tour, the Wonder World Tour. For the performances Cyrus dressed in a short white tutu-like dress and performed the dance with her background dancers. Mid-way through the song, will.i.am appeared on the screens to congratulate Cyrus and continued speaking as she left the stage. When he finished, the dancers performed to a remix of "Boom Boom Pow" by The Black Eyed Peas. \

== Charts ==
=== Weekly charts ===
Chart (2009)	Peak position
Australia (ARIA)	20
Austria (Ö3 Austria Top 40)	41
Canada (Canadian Hot 100)	15
Germany (Official German Charts)	66
Ireland (IRMA)	10
New Zealand (Recorded Music NZ)	40
Norway (VG-lista)	17
Switzerland (Schweizer Hitparade)	87
UK Singles (OCC)	18
US Billboard Hot 100	18

=== Year-end charts ===
Chart (2009)	Position
UK Singles (Official Charts Company)	184

== Certifications ==
Region	Certification	Certified units/sales
Australia (ARIA)	Platinum	70,000^{‡}
New Zealand (RMNZ)	Gold	7,500^{*}
United Kingdom (BPI)	Silver	200,000^{‡}
United States (RIAA)	Platinum	1,000,000^{‡}
^{*} Sales figures based on certification alone.^{‡} Sales+streaming figures based on certification alone.

== Other media ==
"Hoedown Throwdown" is featured in the Mickey Mouse Clubhouse+ special "Mickey's Country Farm", with Megan Hilty as Lasso Lucy along with Mickey and friends performing this version.
