= He Could Be the One =

2009 song by Miley Cyrus

Song by Hannah Montana

from the album Hannah Montana 3
- Released: July 6, 2009
- Recorded: 2008
- Genre: Pop rock; country rock
- Length: 3:00
- Label: Walt Disney
- Songwriters: Kara DioGuardi; Mitch Allan
- Producers: Kara DioGuardi; Mitch Allan

"He Could Be the One" is a song by fictional character Hannah Montana, recorded by American singer and actress Miley Cyrus for the soundtrack album Hannah Montana 3 (2009), which accompanied the third season of the Disney Channel series Hannah Montana. The song was co-written and co-produced by Kara DioGuardi and Mitch Allan. A karaoke version is available in Disney's Karaoke Series: Hannah Montana 3. The song contains country rock elements in its music.

The song became Cyrus' best-charting song as Montana, reaching the top twenty in Norway and the United States. "He Could Be the One" peaked at number 10 on the Billboard Hot 100, thus becoming Cyrus' first and only top ten song as Montana. It was also certified platinum by the Recording Industry Association of America (RIAA) after shipping over 1,000,000 copies. The song's accompanying music video was arranged from clips from various Hannah Montana episodes. It is also featured in Disney's Have a Laugh!'s Re-Micks musical segment.

== Background and composition ==
"He Could Be the One" (2009)
18 second sample from Hannah Montana's "He Could Be the One". The song incorporates elements of country and pop rock music.

"He Could Be the One" was co-written by Kara DioGuardi, who composed a total of four songs on Hannah Montana 3, and Mitch Allan, who composed a total of two songs on the album. A karaoke version is available in Disney's Karaoke Series: Hannah Montana 3. The song premiered on Radio Disney on June 12, 2009 in order to promote the soundtrack and an episode from Hannah Montana of the same title.

"He Could Be the One" is a song with a length of three minutes. According to Warren Truitt of About.com noted its country music elements with "fizzy" pop rock. The song is set in common time and has a moderate tempo of 132 beats per minute. It is written in the key of E major and Cyrus' vocals span two octaves, from B_{3} to D_{6}. Truitt described Cyrus' vocals to be with a slight twang and husky. The lyrics of "He Could Be the One", according to him, about a special crush.

== Reception ==
=== Critical reception ===
Warren Truitt of About.com was immediately reminded of Shania Twain after listening to "He Could Be the One" due to its music and Cyrus' voice in the track. "Throw in a little Gwen Stefani, Joan Jett, and Avril Lavigne, produce it with some [...] Radio Disney", Truitt added about the song's influences. Truitt later listed the song as the seventh best song by Hannah Montana.

=== Chart performance ===
As it was not released as a single, "He Could Be the One" received exclusive airplay on Radio Disney, thus its chart appearances consisted mainly of digital downloads. It soon peaked at number two on the Top 30 Countdown, behind "Here We Go Again" by Demi Lovato. The song debuted at number two on Billboard's Hot Digital Songs Chart, selling 150,000 copies, which led to an appearance on the Billboard Hot 100, on the week ending July 25, 2009. "He Could Be the One" debuted and peaked at number ten on the Billboard Hot 100, thus making the song Montana's highest-charting effort, surpassing her previous best-charting effort "Life's What You Make It", which peaked at number twenty-five in July 2007. It became Cyrus' first and only song to chart in the top ten of the Billboard Hot 100 as Hannah Montana. It spent a total of five weeks on the chart. The song debuted and peaked at number ninety-seven on the Canadian Hot 100, spending one week on the chart.

"He Could Be the One" peaked at number sixty-four on the Australian Singles Chart, becoming Cyrus' best-charting effort as Hannah Montana in Australia. On the week ending January 5, 2010, "He Could Be the One" debuted and peaked at number thirteen on the Norwegian Singles Chart, becoming Cyrus' first entry as Montana in the country. It fell from the Norwegian Singles Chart in the following week.

== Music video ==
Cyrus, as both Miley Stewart (left) and Hannah Montana (right), is struck between two love interests in the music video for "He Could Be the One".

The song's accompanying music video premiered on June 12, 2009 on Disney Channel. The video begins with a narrator speaking, who says, "Boyfriends, one's a heartbreaker. One's got a lot of heart. Miley Stewart wants to know who could be the one", as American actors Cody Linley and Drew Roy are introduced. In the episode "He Could Be the One", Linley portrays Jake Ryan, Stewart's longtime love interest and ex-boyfriend, and Roy portrays Jesse, a guitar player who she eventually becomes attracted to. Stewart is then seen holding a pair of photographs of the two, in confusion. Throughout the remainder of the video, clips from numerous episodes from Hannah Montana are integrated. The video concludes with a scene of Stewart grunting as she again holds the photographs and slams herself against a bed.

== Charts ==
Chart (2009)	Peak position
Australian Singles Chart	64
Canadian Hot 100	97
Norwegian Singles Chart	13
US Billboard Hot 100	10

== Certification ==
Region	Certification	Certified units/sales
New Zealand (RMNZ)	Gold	15,000^{‡}
United Kingdom (BPI)	Silver	200,000^{‡}
United States (RIAA)	Platinum	1,000,000^{‡}
^{‡} Sales+streaming figures based on certification alone.
