= List of Hannah Montana books =

The Hannah Montana book series is a series based on the Disney Channel original series Hannah Montana.

== Series novelizations ==
=== Hannah Montana ===
1. Keeping Secrets - Miley Get Your Gum & It's My Party And I'll Lie If I Want To.
2. Face-Off - You're So Vain, You Probably Think This Zit Is About You & Ooh, Ooh, Itchy Woman.
3. Super Sneak -She's A Super Sneak & I Can't Make You Love Hannah If You Don't.
4. Truth Or Dare - Oops! I Meddled Again & It's A Mannequin's World.
5. Hold On Tight - O Say, Can You Remember The Words? & On The Road Again.
6. Crush-Tastic! - Good Golly, Miss Dolly & Mascot Love.
7. Nightmare On Hannah Street - Torn Between Two Hannahs & Grandma Don't Let Your Babies Grow Up To Be Favorites.
8. Seeing Green - More Than A Zombie To Me & People Who Use People.
9. Face The Music - Smells Like Teen Sellout & We Are Family, Now Get Me Some Water!.
10. Don't Bet On It - Bad Moose Rising & My Boyfriend's Jackson And There's Gonna Be Trouble.
11. Sweet Revenge - The Idol Side Of Me & Schooly Bully.
12. Win Or Lose - Money For Nothing, Guilt For Free & Debt It Be.
13. True Blue - Cuffs will Keep Us Together & Me and Rico Down by the Schoolyard.
14. On the Road - Get Down, Study-udy-udy & I Want You to Want Me... to Go to Florida.
15. Game of Hearts - My Best Friend's Boyfriend & You are So Sue-able to Me.
16. Wishful Thinking - When You Wish You Were The Star & Take This Job and Love It
17. One of a Kind - I am Hannah, Hear Me Croak & You Gotta Not Fight for Your Right to Party.
18. Superstar Secrets - Achy, Jakey Heart (Parts One and Two).
19. Reality Check - Song Sung Bad & Sleepwalk This Way.
20. Hit or Miss - Me and Mr. Jonas and Mr. Jonas and Mr. Jonas & Everybody was Best Friend Fighting

=== Other novelizations ===
1. Hannah Montana: The Movie
2. Rock the Waves
3. Swept Up
4. In the Loop

== Hannah Montana: On tour ==
1. Ciao from Rome!
2. G'day, Sydney!
3. Greetings from Brazil!
4. Live from London!
