= Hannah Montana: The Movie =

2009 film by Peter Chelsom

- Theatrical release poster
- Directed by: Peter Chelsom
- Written by: Dan Berendsen
- Based on: Hannah Montana by: Michael Poryes; Rich Correll; Barry O'Brien
- Produced by: David Blocker; Billy Ray Cyrus; Alfred Gough; Miles Millar; Steven Peterman; Michael Poryes
- Starring: Miley Cyrus; Emily Osment; Jason Earles; Melora Hardin; Vanessa Williams; Billy Ray Cyrus
- Cinematography: David Hennings
- Edited by: David Moritz
- Music by: John Debney
- Production companies: Walt Disney Pictures; It's a Laugh Productions; Millar/Gough Ink
- Distributed by: Walt Disney Studios; Motion Pictures
- Release date: April 10, 2009
- Running time: 102 minutes
- Country: United States
- Language: English
- Budget: $30 million
- Box office: $169.2 million

Hannah Montana: The Movie is a 2009 American teen musical comedy drama film based on the Disney Channel television series Hannah Montana. Directed by Peter Chelsom and written by Dan Berendsen, the film stars series regulars Miley Cyrus, Billy Ray Cyrus, Emily Osment, Moises Arias, Mitchel Musso and Jason Earles, as well as Lucas Till, Vanessa Williams, Margo Martindale and Melora Hardin. The film tells of how Miley Stewart's popularity and alternate celebrity persona begins to take over her life, so her father convinces her to take a trip to her hometown of Crowley Corners, Tennessee to get some perspective on what matters most in life.

Hannah Montana: The Movie is the second theatrical film based on a Disney Channel Original Series after The Lizzie McGuire Movie (2003), and is the second theatrical release of the Hannah Montana franchise, with the concert film Hannah Montana & Miley Cyrus: Best of Both Worlds Concert having been released the previous year. It is also the only theatrical film produced by It's a Laugh Productions and Millar/Gough Ink. Filming began in April 2008, much of it occurring in Columbia, Tennessee, and Los Angeles, California, and was completed in July 2008.

Hannah Montana: The Movie was released theatrically by Walt Disney Studios Motion Pictures on April 10, 2009, in the United States. Despite mixed reviews, the film was a commercial success, grossing $169.2 million worldwide against a $30 million production budget.

== Plot ==
Miley Stewart and her best friend Lilly Truscott arrive at a concert and race through the backdoor just in time for Miley to perform as her secret alter ego: pop superstar singer Hannah Montana. After filming a music video for her song "The Best of Both Worlds", Miley – as Hannah – is confronted by Oswald Granger, an unscrupulous tabloid reporter. Hannah's publicist Vita sends Oswald away, but he manages to record her alluding to Hannah's "secret", which he reports to his editor Lucinda and becomes determined to uncover.

While shopping as Hannah, Miley fights with Tyra Banks over a pair of shoes she plans to give as a gift to Lilly, making her late for Lilly's Sweet Sixteen birthday party at the pier. Oswald records the incident and follows her to the party, forcing Miley to attend as Hannah in order to prevent him from learning her secret. Hannah's presence steals the entire party's attention, as does her performance of "Let's Get Crazy". Lilly leaves dejected and is stopped and questioned by Oswald, to whom she reveals that Hannah is from Crowley Corners, Tennessee.

Already upset with Miley for prioritizing her celebrity life over her family and friends, her father Robby is infuriated when her fight with Tyra makes headlines. He allows Vita to book a private jet for Miley to attend an awards show as Hannah, but instead flies her to Crowley Corners to spend two weeks there for her grandmother Ruby's birthday. Miley is eager to return to being Hannah, but Ruby chastises her for neglecting to spend time with her family. Miley feels very remorseful and wants to stop being Hannah Montana forever. She sadly looks at the picture of her late mother and wishes she were still alive.

Miley gradually reconnects with small-town life, her grandmother, and her childhood friend Travis Brody, while Robby is drawn to a local woman named Lorelai. Oswald arrives, and Miley is forced to misdirect him by claiming to know Hannah. The town holds a fundraiser to prevent developer Mr. Bradley from turning local land into a shopping mall, organizing a barn party where Taylor Swift makes an appearance with a performance of "Crazier." Robby also performs "Back to Tennessee" and Miley performs "Hoedown Throwdown" as herself, making the crowd go wild. When Mr. Bradley tells the crowd they will never raise enough money, Travis suggests Miley ask Hannah to hold a concert.

Lilly arrives disguised as Hannah to throw off Oswald and reconciles with Miley. Travis asks Miley out on a date, but she has already been invited by Lorelai to a dinner as Hannah with the town's mayor. Miley tries to run back and forth between both dinners, but Travis catches her mid-change and deduces her secret before leaving in disappointment. Miley then overhears Robby rejecting Lorelai in order to protect Miley's double life. Heartbroken and deeply hurt, Miley runs away to her gazebo and cries. She really doesn’t want to be Hannah Montana or live a double life anymore. She cries for her late mother to still be alive. Robby Ray comforts her. Miley finishes writing "Butterfly Fly Away", which she and her father sing together. She stays up all night to complete the chicken coop she and Travis were building; touched by this, he attends Hannah's concert.

As the town prepares for the concert, Miley receives her late mother's necklace from Ruby. Miley (as Hannah) stops performing "Rock Star" when she sees Travis and Lorelai in the audience and announces that she can no longer live a lie before removing her blonde wig, revealing her true identity to the crowd. After she sings "The Climb", the crowd pleads with her to continue being Hannah and promises to keep her secret, but Miley refuses. Oswald takes a picture of Miley, but before he can publish it to Lucinda, his daughters arrive – flown to the concert by Vita – and their admiration for Hannah convinces him not to sell the story; he rebukes Lucinda and quits. Miley reconciles with and kisses Travis and returns to the stage to finish the concert with one final song as herself, "You'll Always Find Your Way Back Home", as Lorelai and Robby reunite and kiss. During the credits, the cast dances to "Hoedown Throwdown".

== Cast ==
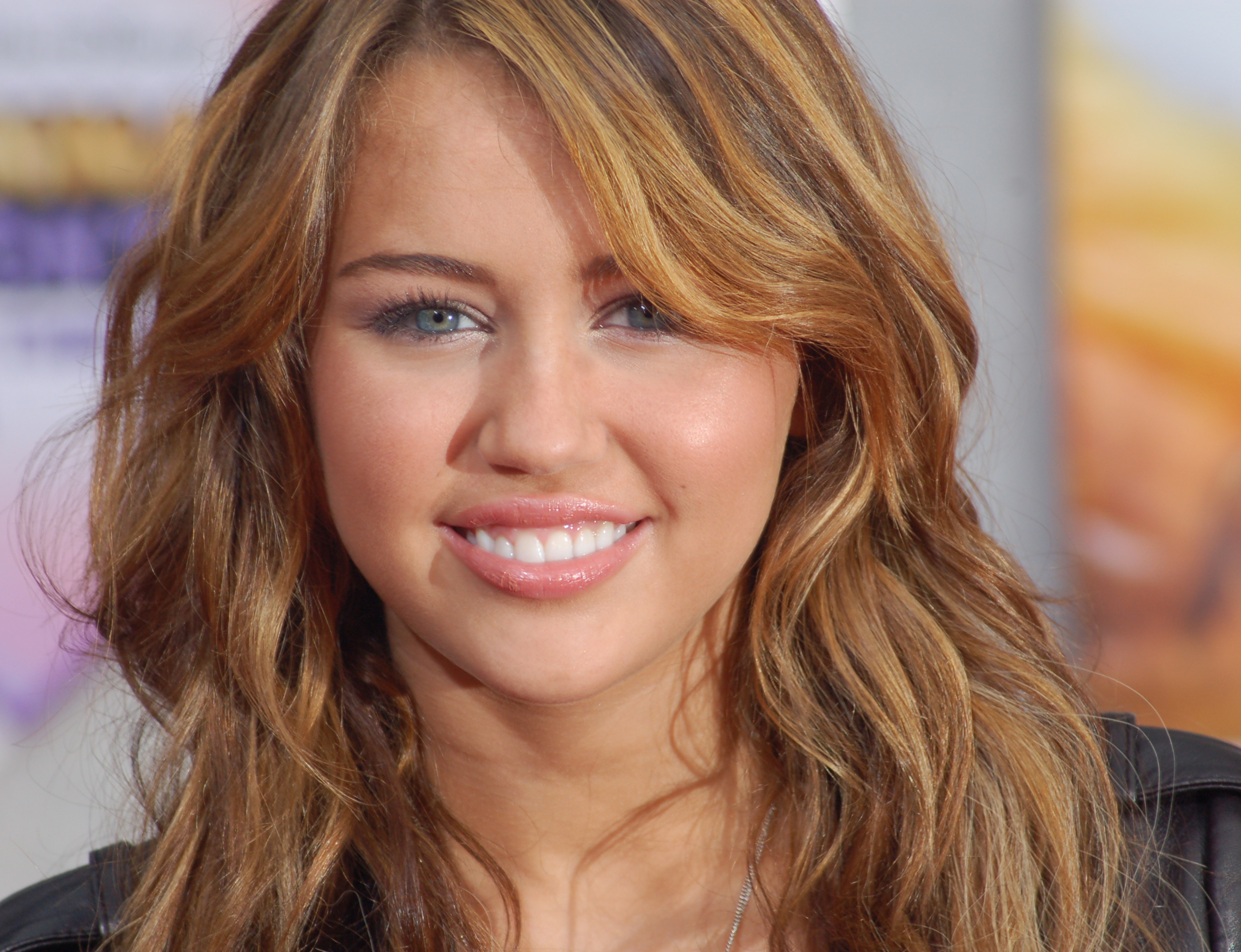
Miley Cyrus at the premiere for the film

- Miley Cyrus as Miley Stewart / Hannah Montana
- Emily Osment as Lilly Truscott
- Margo Martindale as Grandma Ruby
- Jason Earles as Jackson Stewart
- Peter Gunn as Oswald Granger
- Melora Hardin as Lorelai
- Mitchel Musso as Oliver Oken
- Vanessa Williams as Vita
- Billy Ray Cyrus as Robby Ray Stewart
- Lucas Till as Travis Brody
- Barry Bostwick as Mr. Bradley
- Moises Arias as Rico Suave
- Rachel Woods as Phoebe Granger
- Natalia Dyer as Clarissa Granger
- Jared Carter as Derrick
- Beau Billingslea as the Mayor of Crowley Corners
- Katrina Hagger Smith as the mayor's wife
- Emily Grace Reaves as Cindy Lou
- Jane Carr as Lucinda
- Taylor Swift as herself
- Rascal Flatts as themselves
- Brooke Bell as Liza Bell
- Tyra Banks as herself (uncredited)
- Brooke Shields as Susan Stewart (uncredited)

== Production ==
=== Development ===
The best idea is that I miss home. So if we could maybe film in Nashville and everyone could see our house and where we live, that we have a farm, that would be really exciting.

— Miley Cyrus

While attending the premiere of Harry Potter and the Order of the Phoenix, Billy Ray Cyrus and Miley Cyrus said they were planning to make a film adaptation for their TV series Hannah Montana, which debuted on Disney Channel on March 24, 2006, and expected it to be a feature film produced by Walt Disney Pictures, rather than a Disney Channel Original Movie.

Since writers were still working on the script for the movie, Cyrus was free to share whatever ideas she had for the upcoming project. She said that, at the time, the best concept she thought of involved returning to her hometown of Nashville, Tennessee. Cyrus spent most of her time away from her beloved home since Hannah Montana was taped at Tribune Studios in Hollywood. She spent up to eight and a half hours a day working on the set.

Billy Ray Cyrus shared further details about the script: "There'll be a lot of similarities [to the show], and the fact that Miley is so real, her music is real, we'll keep a lot of that realism. But I think we'll go a little further with the comedy. And it's going to be on the big screen, so we'll try to make everything look bigger." The movie went into production on an estimated $30 million budget.

On the April 2 episode of The Miley & Mandy Show on YouTube, Miley spoke to Ryan Seacrest on flying to Tennessee in "two weeks" and would be staying for several months. She went on to say there would be many guest stars, and she'd ride horses and attend school.

=== Filming ===
Filming began in April 2008 in Los Angeles, California and Columbia, Tennessee. It entered production in May 2008 and post-production in July 2008. The beginning of the film was shot in Los Angeles including The Forum and Santa Monica State Beach. Several scenes were filmed in Nashville, Tennessee, based on Miley's and her father's hometown, for the scene when Miley Stewart/Hannah Montana travels back home, with fairground scenes filmed near the end of the movie.

There is a carnival scene filmed at Smiley Hollow in Ridgetop, Tennessee where Peter Gunn's character hunts for the real Hannah in the crowd. He finds Jackson selling "Hannah wigs" and everyone around him looks like Hannah from the back so he turns them all around looking for the real one.

The songs "Backwards" (co-written by Marcel and Tony Mullins and recorded by Rascal Flatts) and "Crazier" (by Taylor Swift) were featured in the movie as well as "Game Over" and another hit song by UK rocker Steve Rushton. There were also a few musical numbers filmed, including "The Climb" and "You'll Always Find Your Way Back Home". 500 paid extras and 1500 volunteer extras were on hand during filming of these scenes. In some scenes, Miley rode horses.

A scene was filmed at the Cool Springs Galleria in Franklin, Tennessee. It was filmed in the women's shoe department of the Belk store. Miley Cyrus, Vanessa Williams, and Tyra Banks were all in the scene, where Hannah fights with Tyra over a pair of shoes. Franklin High School stood-in for the fictional Seaview High School, where Miley and Lilly attend.

==== Accident ====
On June 3, 2008, there was an accident on the set during the filming. A huge wind blew a projection screen into a Ferris wheel full of passengers, who were extras for the movie. There was no serious injury. "When the wind caught it, all the cables were loose. It started [flying]," extra Brenda Blackford told Nashville station WKRN-TV. "I was watching to see which corner of it was gonna hit the Ferris wheel, because it was unavoidable". Miley Cyrus and her father Billy Ray were not on the set when the accident happened. Disney stated: "During a break in the filming of Hannah Montana: The Movie, a minor accident occurred involving a piece of production equipment. Fortunately, there were only a few minor injuries. Medical personnel have treated the extras and crew involved. None of the cast was on the set. Filming has resumed."

=== Soundtrack ===
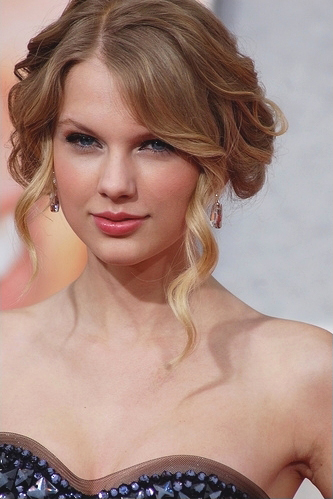
Taylor Swift at the 2009 premiere of Hannah Montana: The Movie. She had a cameo appearance in the film and wrote two songs for its soundtrack.

Walt Disney Records released the soundtrack on March 24, 2009, on the third anniversary of Hannah Montana's 2006 debut, with songs by Miley Cyrus, Hannah Montana, Billy Ray Cyrus, Rascal Flatts, Taylor Swift, and Steve Rushton. The score was originally to be written by composer Alan Silvestri, and he penned a new song with Glen Ballard, "Butterfly Fly Away", which is sung in the film. Due to a scheduling conflict with G.I. Joe: The Rise of Cobra, which he was also signed to score, he had to drop out. (However, a cue from Silvestri's score to The Mexican is tracked into the movie.) Stepping in was composer John Debney, who recorded his score with the Hollywood Studio Symphony at the Sony Scoring Stage. The album debuted at No. 2 on the Billboard 200 with 137,592 sold in the first week, and after four weeks claimed the No. 1 spot. A karaoke version was released on August 18, 2009.

== Marketing and release ==
The film was issued a G-rating from the MPAA for all ages admitted. The premiere of Hannah Montana: The Movie was held on April 2, 2009, in Los Angeles. The UK premiere was held in London on April 23, 2009; it was released in British and Irish cinemas on May 1, 2009. Play Along Toys released dolls and toys based on the film. The film made its world television premiere on the Disney Channel on Friday November 19, 2010, where it drew 4.6 million viewers.

On January 15, 2009, the film's official trailer was released, along with the official poster on a website, as a sneak peek of the film was released in December 2008 on Disney Channel, including on New Year's Eve. On February 16, 2009, an exclusive Disney Channel preview was premiered alongside the music videos "The Climb" and "Hoedown Throwdown" from the Hannah Montana: The Movie soundtrack previewed by Miley Cyrus. Cyrus also promoted the film and performed the film's lead single "The Climb" on various talk shows including, The Tonight Show with Jay Leno, Good Morning America, The Tyra Banks Show, and Rachael Ray. She also performed her song on American Idol on April 16, 2009. A video game based on the film was released on April 7, 2009, three days before the film's release. The game was revealed by ESRB. The game was released for 7th gens.

=== Home media ===
Hannah Montana: The Movie was released by Walt Disney Studios Home Entertainment on DVD and Blu-ray on August 18, 2009. Hannah Montana: The Movie was released on DVD and Blu-ray on September 7 in the UK. It was also released on DVD, Blu-ray and Disney Digital in Australia on October 21. First week sales were strong with 1,232,725 DVD copies sold and over $20 million in revenue. Total DVD sales to date stand at 3,610,964 and $61 million in revenue. Extras include behind the scenes, bloopers, sneak peeks and more.

There were 3 editions released:

- The 1-disc DVD (the normal DVD)
- The 2-disc DVD (normal DVD and digital copy)
- The 3-disc Blu-ray (the Blu-ray disc, the normal DVD and the digital copy)

== Reception ==
=== Box office ===
On its opening day, the film grossed $17,436,095, and earned $32,324,487 on its opening weekend, with a $10,367 average from 3,118 theaters, earning the No. 1 spot. However the film lost 58% of its gross its second weekend, falling to No. 3, earning $13,406,217 with a $4,300 average and gaining 113 theaters. The film ended up grossing $79,576,189 in the U.S., and $75,969,090 overseas, and a total of $155,545,279 worldwide.

=== Critical reception ===
On Rotten Tomatoes, the film holds an approval rating of 44% based on 129 reviews, with an average rating of 5.2/10. The site's critical consensus reads: "While youthful Miley fans won't complain, Hannah Montana the Movie is little more than a formulaic Disney Channel episode stretched thin." Metacritic gives a score of 47 out of 100, based on 25 critics, indicating "mixed or average" reviews. Audiences polled by CinemaScore gave the film an average grade of "A" on an A+ to F scale.

Entertainment Weekly praised: "The surface lesson of the movie is that celebrity life looks easy but it's hard. The real lesson, as always, is that since even Miley has to work overtime to be Hannah, every girl in the audience – if she tries hard enough – can become the star she longs to be." Peter Hartlaub from San Francisco Chronicle praised: "Hannah Montana: The Movie isn't an abomination. The characters are wholesome, the plot is easy to follow and the songs all sound the same, so you can really only get one stuck in your head at a time. But even as adults give their blessing for prepubescent moviegoers to see the film, they should be plotting to stay as far away from the theater as possible. If you're no longer old enough to carry a Hannah Montana lunch box, this movie will feel like punishment."

Atomic Popcorn stated: "Hip-hop and country. Like the Hannah Montana's theme song says, "You get the best of both worlds." Ten minutes before the movie started, the two rows of what looked to be 14-year-old girls started singing the TV show theme song. Over and over again. The little 6-to-10-year-old girls that filled the rest of the theater were singing along and dancing in their seats. My 16-year-old daughter said with a big smile on her face, 'Isn't this fun?' I said, with as much of a smile as I could muster, 'A little bit.'" Blogcritics noted: "This movie definitely hit the target audience mark with the best opening day for a live action, G-rated movie. The predictable ending strays from the fun tone to address drama from the two main character arcs. Some stereotypes and commercialism weaken the movie, but target and general audiences can find a wide variety of appealing elements here while Hannah fans won't be disappointed."

=== Accolades ===
MTV Movie Awards
Year	Category	Recipient	Result
2009	Best Song from a Movie	Miley Cyrus (for the song "The Climb")	Won
2009	Breakthrough Performance Female	Miley Cyrus	Nominated
Teen Choice Awards
2009	Choice Movie Actress: Music/Dance	Miley Cyrus	Won
2009	Choice Hissy Fit	Miley Cyrus	Won
2009	Choice Movie Actor: Music/Dance	Jason Earles	Nominated
2009	Choice Movie Fresh Face Female	Emily Osment	Nominated
2009	Choice Movie Liplock	Miley Cyrus and Lucas Till	Nominated
2009	Choice Music Single	Miley Cyrus(for the song "The Climb")	Won
2009	Choice Movie: Music/Dance	Movie	Nominated
2009	Choice Music Album: Soundtrack	Movie	Nominated
People's Choice Awards
2010	Favorite Family Movie	Cast	Nominated
Kids' Choice Awards
2010	Favorite Movie Actress	Miley Cyrus	Won
Golden Raspberry Awards
2010	Worst Actress	Miley Cyrus	Nominated
2010	Worst Supporting Actor	Billy Ray Cyrus	Won

== See also ==
- Hannah Montana & Miley Cyrus: Best of Both Worlds Concert
