= Miley Stewart =

Fictional character from the television series Hannah Montana

- Hannah Montana character
- Miley Cyrus as Miley Stewart in Hannah Montana
- First appearance: "Lilly, Do You Want to Know a Secret?" (2006)
- Last appearance: "Wherever I Go" (2011)
- Created by: Michael Poryes; Rich Correll; Barry O'Brien
- Portrayed by: Miley Cyrus; Ryan Newman (young); Mary-Charles Jones (young)

In-universe information
- Full name: Miley Ray Stewart
- Alias: Hannah Montana
- Gender: Female
- Occupation: student; singer; songwriter; actress; dancer; spokeswoman
- Significant others: Jake Ryan; Travis Brody; Jesse
- Relatives: Susan Stewart (mother); Robby Ray Stewart (father); Jackson Stewart (brother); Luann Stewart (twin cousin); List of family members
- Nationality: American

Miley Ray Stewart is a fictional character and central protagonist of the Disney Channel television series Hannah Montana, portrayed by Miley Cyrus. Miley is a normal teenage girl who secretly leads a double life as Hannah Montana, a world-famous pop star.

She first appeared on television in the pilot episode "Lilly, Do You Want to Know a Secret?" on March 24, 2006, and made her final appearance in the series finale "Wherever I Go" on January 16, 2011. The character also appeared in the 2009 feature film Hannah Montana: The Movie. The character's alter ego, Hannah Montana, also made an appearance in the Hannah Montana 20th Anniversary Special, on March 24, 2026.

== Conception and casting ==
The character was originally named Chloe Stewart but was changed to Miley Stewart.

Miley Cyrus learned about the casting for a new Disney show at the age of 11 through a Nashville talent agent. She sent in a tape auditioning for the show's best friend role, but received a call asking her to audition for the lead. After she sent in a tape and was flown to Hollywood for further auditions, Cyrus was told that she was too young and too small for the role. However, Cyrus's persistence and ability to sing in addition to act caused the show's producers to invite her back for further auditions. By May 2005, producers eventually narrowed the large pool of candidates down to three actresses: Cyrus, Taylor Momsen, and Daniella Monet. Disney Channel president Gary Marsh later claimed that Cyrus, then twelve, was eventually chosen because of her energetic and lively performance and was seen as a person who "loves every minute of life," with the "everyday relatability of Hilary Duff and the stage presence of Shania Twain."

Cyrus's casting also led to the casting of her real life father, Billy Ray Cyrus, as the father of her character on the show. Cyrus was initially wary; according to her mother and co-manager, Tish Cyrus, "Miley Cyrus's concern at the time was, oh my gosh, people are going to think I only got this part because of my dad." However, worried that her family would otherwise have to be separated as they had been when her father first landed the lead in the television series Doc, Cyrus relented and helped audition her father for the part.

== Character ==
=== Backstory ===
Miley was born on November 23, 1992 (Cyrus's real birth date), in the fictional town of Crowley Corners in Buford County, Tennessee. Miley received a love for music from her father, who was a popular country music star. Her parents recognized Miley's potential and gave her a guitar on December 25, 2000. This event is shown in the episode "I Am Hannah, Hear Me Croak" when Miley views it on her laptop.

By the time she was 12 years old, Miley had become a famous pop star under the stage name Hannah Montana. She goes to great lengths to disguise herself as Hannah in order to keep her true identity a secret, because she is worried that if people knew her secret they would like her just because she's famous. Before revealing her secret in I'll Always Remember You, it is mentioned by Jackson, Sienna and Rico that the only people to know about her secret beside her family are Lilly and Oliver, her former bodyguard Roxy, her ex-boyfriend Jake, her current boyfriend Jesse, Sienna and all of Crowley Corners, Tennessee. However, in the episode "Hannah Montana to the Principal's Office" it is shown that the President of the United States knows her secret.

=== Family relationships ===
Miley is especially close with her father, from whom she receives much good advice and emotional support. She also values her relationships with her best friends Lilly and Oliver. However Miley is shown to be very uncomfortable with the fact that they're dating and even stops them from being a couple. Her relationship with Lilly occasionally suffers the occasional setback, but they always make up. In the episode 'What I Don't Like About You', Miley is asked to choose a side between a fight Lilly and Oliver had. But Miley, showing what a kind friend she was, made a mini-Indiana Joannie movie, which made Lilly and Oliver forgive each other. Miley's relationship with her brother Jackson is often hostile. The two siblings constantly fight and trash talk each other. However, in a few private conversations, both Miley and Jackson say that they love and appreciate each other, but they are both unwilling to admit this in public.

=== Romantic relationships ===
Miley also has several dating relationships, many of which are short lived.

Oliver Oken (played by Mitchel Musso): Miley and Lilly's best male friend.

Leslie "Jake" Ryan (played by Cody Linley): Jake is a famous television star. Miley and Jake meet when he briefly attends Seaview Middle School. Jake is attracted to Miley because she is the only person at school who is not starstruck by his arrival.

Travis Brody (played by Lucas Till): Travis is a childhood friend from Tennessee.

Jesse (played by Drew Roy): Jesse is a part of Hannah's band in the episode "He Could Be The One". Hannah pretends to like Jesse, so that Robby will be thankful of Jake, but she starts to have real feelings for him.

=== Education ===
In the first season, Miley is an 8th grader at Seaview Middle School, and in the second season she enters Seaview High School. She became a sophomore in early episodes in Season 3 and later, a junior during the season before the beginning of Season 4. Despite her father offering her the option of homeschooling, Miley decided to attend public school in order to be a "normal kid," a decision she sometimes finds herself regretting. Due to her double life, she is often in awkward positions and is forced to lie in order to keep her secret.

=== Hobbies and interests ===
Apart from her life as a pop star, Miley leads a very normal life. She is fond of camping and hanging out at the beach, but is not at all athletic. She has a fear of spiders and visiting the dentist. She also occasionally struggles with her schoolwork and her self-confidence. She often goes through over-the-top schemes to deal with her problems. Although she never plays instruments while performing as Hannah, Miley can play the piano and the guitar. She owns several acoustic and electric guitars, including a black strat copy she nicknamed "Whammy Bar Wally" and a pink sparkle electric acoustic Stardust Series Daisy Rock guitar. In Hannah Montana: The Movie, Miley plays a custom built Gibson acoustic guitar.

== Hannah Montana ==
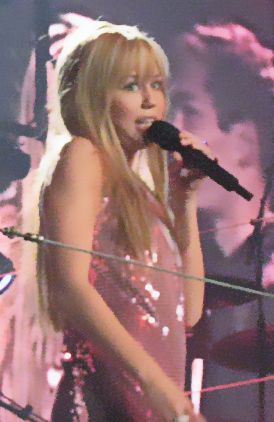
Miley Cyrus as Hannah Montana during the Best of Both Worlds Tour.

Hannah Montana is Miley Stewart's alter ego. The character was originally going to be named Alexis Texas, but the name was changed to Hannah Montana. Hannah exists as a secret identity, an extremely popular and influential worldwide pop star. Hannah's many fans are not aware that she is really just a normal teenage girl, and Miley tries to keep her two lives separate from each other.

=== Secret and purpose ===
Keeping Miley's secret involves a two sided effort. As Hannah, she must keep her fans unaware that she is really a normal kid, and as Miley, she must keep her friends unaware that she is really Hannah Montana. In interviews, Cyrus spoke of the implausibility of being able to keep a secret such as Miley and her family do in the show in a world of intense media scrutiny. The show however, remains workable primarily based on suspension of disbelief.

In the show, three other people (Robby, Lilly, and Oliver) also wear disguises when around Hannah to prevent anyone from drawing a connection to Miley (Jackson is himself, only as a childhood friend). Hannah also typically swaps limos as she leaves concert venues to keep the paparazzi from following her home. Miley must also rely on the silence of the people who know her secret. These include her family members, Robby, Jackson, Mammaw Ruthie, Aunt Dolly, Uncle Earl and Aunt Pearl, her cousin Luann, her friends Lilly Truscott and her parents, Oliver Oken and his mother, Jake Ryan, Fermine and Roxy, as well as Officer Diaria and his daughter Kelsey, Siena and the President of the United States. (This group grows exponentially at the end of Hannah Montana: The Movie.)

Despite these careful efforts, her father seems to enjoy writing Hannah songs which explicitly speak of her double life, such as "The Best of Both Worlds," "Just Like You," "The Other Side of Me," "Rock Star," "Old Blue Jeans," "Just a Girl," "Supergirl," and "Ordinary Girl." In frustration of this, Miley once complained "You might as well tattoo 'I'm really Miley Stewart' on my forehead!" Also, in the episode "Get Down Study-udy-udy", Rico has almost discovered Miley's secret according to the "Bone Dance" which was created by Miley by rewriting the lyrics of "Nobody's Perfect" and her voice singing it.

In Hannah Montana: The Movie, Hannah reveals herself as Miley during a concert in her hometown of Crowley Corners, Tennessee, but her fans do not want her to stop being Hannah, and so they promise to keep her secret. This event is actually mentioned in "For (Give) a Little Bit" during an argument between Miley and Jackson, meaning that the movie would fit right in the middle of season 3 as if it were a part of the season.

Near the end of the series, in "I'll Always Remember You", Miley reveals her secret on The Jay Leno Show by taking off her wig and singing a song called "Wherever I Go" as Miley. She gets a standing ovation and the episode ends with Miley smiling. Lilly and Robby also take off their disguises.

Miley has several reasons for creating Hannah. She is afraid that if the kids at school discover she is famous, they won't treat her the same. While she enjoys the attention of her fame as Hannah, she equally enjoys the option of "stepping out" of her role. Miley also values her privacy and doesn't want fans or paparazzi photographers mobbing her when she goes out in public. In this way, Hannah Montana presents a unique inversion of typical celebrity experiences. While most celebrities become famous as themselves and later need disguises to not be noticed in public, Hannah Montana became famous while in disguise, and now has the freedom to be in public as herself.

As a secondary benefit, Miley also sometimes uses Hannah for specific purposes such as spying. She also uses Hannah in other ways. In "Money for Nothing, Guilt for Free," Hannah raises money for a school charity drive in which Miley is competing. In "Bye Bye, Ball," Hannah performs at a restaurant in order to get a baseball autographed for Jackson. And in "Ready, Set, Don't Drive," Hannah obtains a driver's license after Miley fails the test. Hannah also sometimes tries to use her dual personality as an excuse. For example, in "You Gotta Not Fight for Your Right to Party," Miley asks Robby to only ground Miley, not Hannah, because "Hannah didn't do anything wrong."

=== Appearance ===
Hannah's blonde wig is the primary difference between her and the brunette Miley, although Hannah also wears more extravagant clothes, make-up, and sometimes large sunglasses. In the Hannah Montana story, the famous blonde wig was picked out for Miley by Roxy. Miley Stewart also mentions that she intentionally patterned Hannah's look after her godmother Aunt Dolly Parton, though it was never officially stated if Parton was the true inspiration behind the character's wardrobe, Hannah's look does draw heavy influence from the real-life Parton as she is the real-life godmother of Cyrus.

=== Career ===
Hannah Montana's music career is very successful although there have been a few slips. In the pilot episode she is said to be continuing a "smash tour" which was being sold out, yet the subsequent episodes show Miley still going to school (something that wouldn't be possible with a "smash tour"). In "Yet Another Side of Me," Robby says that he has written 15 straight number ones for her. However, he may have been exaggerating since in "Miley Hurt the Feelings of the Radio Star" he says he has written 14 number ones for her. Hannah also wins several awards including a Silver Boot "Booty" award for best country pop crossover with the song "True Friend," and an International Music Award for Female Artist of the Year. She is also honored with her own diamond on the Hollywood Parade of Diamonds, a parody of the stars on the Hollywood Walk of Fame. She also sings for the Queen of the United Kingdom and the President of the United States (President Martinez in a crossover episode and mentioned performing for President Obama and Sasha and Malia Obama in season 4's "Hannah Montana to the Principal's Office"). Hannah's greatest rival is fellow pop star Mikayla (Selena Gomez) who is determined to steal Hannah's fans. Hannah also has collaborated with several real-life celebrities, nl: The Jonas Brothers, Sheryl Crow, David Archuleta, Iyaz and Billy Ray Cyrus.

Beyond her music career, Hannah also does some acting. She guest stars on the television show Zombie High as Zaronda, Princess of the Undead. Jake Ryan's character saves Zaronda from the portal to the underworld. Hannah later stars in her own feature film, Rob Reiner's Indiana Joannie and the Curse of the Golden Cobra (a parody of the Indiana Jones film franchise), alongside Chace Crawford. Hannah also endorses perfume and skin care products.

=== Discography ===
- Hannah Montana (2006)
- Hannah Montana 2/Meet Miley Cyrus (2007)
- Hannah Montana 3 (2009)
- Hannah Montana Forever (2010)
- Hannah Montana: The Movie (2009)
- Hannah Montana Best of Both Worlds Concert

== Beyond the series ==
Hannah Montana as a character has found fame beyond the television show, primarily as a recording artist and music performer. Three of the seven released soundtracks (Hannah Montana, Hannah Montana 2/Meet Miley Cyrus, and Hannah Montana: The Movie) topped the U.S. Billboard 200 chart as well as several singles credited to the character, charted on the Billboard Hot 100. "He Could Be the One" is the first, and thus far only single credited to Montana that reached the Top 10 on the Hot 100. From September to October 2006, Cyrus performed several songs from Hannah Montana during The Party's Just Begun Tour as an opening act for The Cheetah Girls. Then, from October 2007 to January 2008, Cyrus performed in a successful concert tour as Hannah Montana. The tour, called the Best of Both Worlds Tour, became a classic example of life imitating art as Hannah Montana's fictional popularity seen in the television show became a real-life fan base which bought out every concert. The popularity of Hannah Montana has also given Cyrus the opportunity to become a pop star in her own right.

Hannah also appears in Hannah Montana: The Movie, the Hannah Montana book series, and two other Disney Channel shows in cameo appearances. The character appeared in The Suite Life of Zack & Cody episode "That's So Suite Life of Hannah Montana" along with Raven Baxter, and The Suite Life on Deck episode "Wizards on Deck With Hannah Montana" which also includes characters from Wizards of Waverly Place.

Cryus reprised her iconic role as Hannah in the Hannah Montana 20th Anniversary Special that was released on March 24, 2026, on Disney+. Filming took place in February 2026 in front of a live studio audience. The special commemorated the 20th anniversary of the original series and featured appearances by former cast members, musical performances, and retrospective segments.
