= Hannah Montana (disambiguation) =

Hannah Montana is an American children's television series.

Hannah Montana may also refer to:

- Miley Stewart, whose alter ego is Hannah Montana

== Music ==
- Hannah Montana (soundtrack), the soundtrack to the first season of the show
- Hannah Montana 2: Meet Miley Cyrus, the soundtrack to the second season of the show and Miley Cyrus's first album
- Hannah Montana 2: Non-Stop Dance Party, the remix album to Hannah Montana 2
- Hannah Montana 3, the soundtrack to the third season of the show
- Hannah Montana & Miley Cyrus: Best of Both Worlds Concert (album), soundtrack to The Best of Both Worlds Concert film and a live album from Miley Cyrus
- Hannah Montana Forever (disambiguation), season 4 of Hannah Montana and the soundtrack for the season
- Hannah Montana: The Movie (soundtrack), the soundtrack album consisting of all the songs used in Hannah Montana: The Movie
- "Hannah Montana" (song), a song by Migos from the mixtape Y.R.N., 2013
- "Hannah Montana", a song by Ice Spice from the album Y2K!: I’m Just a Girl, 2024

== Software ==
- Hannah Montana (video game), a title for the Nintendo DS based on the series
- Hannah Montana: Music Jam, the title for the third game based on the series
- Hannah Montana: Spotlight World Tour, the title for the second game based on the series

== Other ==
- Hannah Montana: The Movie, a 2009 American musical film adaption of the American sitcom
- List of Hannah Montana books, the book series based on the show
- Best of Both Worlds Tour (Miley Cyrus), a 2007/2008 concert tour of 56 shows
