= Best of Both Worlds Concert (soundtrack) =

2008 live album by Miley Cyrus

Live album / soundtrack album by Hannah Montana and Miley Cyrus
- Released: March 11, 2008
- Recorded: 2007
- Genre: Pop rock
- Length: 50:20
- Labels: Walt Disney; Hollywood

Miley Cyrus chronology
Hannah Montana 2: Non-Stop Dance Party (2008)	Best of Both Worlds Concert (2008)	Breakout (2008)

Best of Both Worlds Concert is the first live album by American singer Miley Cyrus, featuring songs performed both in character as Hannah Montana and under her own name. It was released by Walt Disney Records on March 11, 2008. Most of the album was recorded during her concert as part of the Best of Both Worlds Tour at the EnergySolutions Arena in Salt Lake City in October 2007, with the set list including songs from Hannah Montana (2006) and Hannah Montana 2: Meet Miley Cyrus (2007). It was preceded by the release of the 2008 concert film Hannah Montana & Miley Cyrus: Best of Both Worlds Concert. The album debuted at number three on the Billboard 200, selling 47,000 copies in its first week.

== Track listing ==
Best of Both Worlds Concert – Disc 1 (CD)
No.	Title	Length
1.	"Rock Star" (performed by Hannah Montana)	3:35
2.	"Life's What You Make It" (performed by Hannah Montana)	3:14
3.	"Just Like You" (performed by Hannah Montana)	3:20
4.	"Nobody's Perfect" (performed by Hannah Montana)	3:33
5.	"Pumpin' Up the Party" (performed by Hannah Montana)	3:11
6.	"I Got Nerve" (performed by Hannah Montana)	3:10
7.	"We Got the Party" (performed by Hannah Montana and Jonas Brothers)	4:18
8.	"Start All Over" (performed by Miley Cyrus)	4:40
9.	"Good and Broken" (performed by Miley Cyrus)	2:57
10.	"See You Again" (performed by Miley Cyrus)	3:42
11.	"Let's Dance" (performed by Miley Cyrus)	3:26
12.	"East Northumberland High" (performed by Miley Cyrus)	3:52
13.	"G.N.O. (Girl's Night Out)" (performed by Miley Cyrus)	3:49
14.	"The Best of Both Worlds" (performed by Miley Cyrus and Hannah Montana)	3:27
Total length:		50:20

Best of Both Worlds Concert – Disc 2 (DVD)
No.	Title	Length
1.	"Rock Star" (Live from Salt Lake City)	3:30
2.	"Start All Over" (Live from Salt Lake City)	4:22
3.	"Hangin' with the Rock Star on Tour"	7:45
4.	"Photo Slideshow of Tour"	3:07
Total length:		18:44

== Charts ==
=== Weekly charts ===
Chart (2008)	Peak position
Australian Albums (ARIA)	16
Austrian Albums (Ö3 Austria)	14
Belgian Albums (Ultratop Wallonia)	100
Brazilian Albums (ABPD)	4
Canadian Albums (Billboard)	3
French Albums (SNEP)	192
German Albums (Offizielle Top 100)	94
Icelandic Albums (Tónlistinn)	10
Mexican Albums (Top 100 Mexico)	71
New Zealand Albums (RMNZ)	27
Spanish Albums (Promusicae)	46
Swiss Albums (Schweizer Hitparade)	54
UK Albums (Official Charts)	29
US Billboard 200	3
US Kid Albums (Billboard)	1

=== Year-end charts ===
Chart (2008)	Position
Australian Albums (ARIA)	97
US Billboard 200	97

== Sales and certifications ==
Region	Certification	Certified units/sales
Australia (ARIA)	Gold	35,000^{^}
Brazil (Pro-Música Brasil)	Gold	30,000^{*}
United Kingdom (BPI)	2× Platinum	100,000^{^}
^{*} Sales figures based on certification alone.^{^} Shipments figures based on certification alone.

== Release history ==
Country	Date	Format	Label	Ref.
United States	March 11, 2008	CD; digital download	Walt Disney	
United Kingdom	April 14, 2008	CD; digital download	Walt Disney	
Latin America	April 20, 2008	CD; digital download	Walt Disney	
Australia	April 21, 2008	CD; digital download	Walt Disney	
Spain	April 22, 2008	CD; digital download	Walt Disney	
Asia	June 21, 2008	CD; digital download	Walt Disney	
Hong Kong	June 27, 2008	CD; digital download	Walt Disney	
