= I Miss You (Miley Cyrus song) =

Song by Miley Cyrus

from the album Meet Miley Cyrus
- Recorded: 2006
- Studio: Castlebury Studios (Franklin, Tennessee); The Sound Kitchen (Franklin, Tennessee)
- Genre: Country rock
- Length: 3:58
- Label: Hollywood
- Songwriters: Destiny Hope Cyrus; Brian Green; Wendy Foy Green
- Producer: Brian Green

"I Miss You" is a song by American recording artist, Miley Cyrus. It was co-written by Cyrus (credited under her birth name Destiny Hope Cyrus), Wendy Foy Green, and its producer Brian Green. "I Miss You" is an homage to Cyrus' grandfather, Ron Cyrus, who died less than a month before Hannah Montana premiered. It was released on the album Hannah Montana 2: Meet Miley Cyrus. The song is a ballad with rock and country influences.

The song received generally positive reviews from music critics; some commented on how it deviated from her usual material at the time and how effective the message was. "I Miss You" appeared on two United States charts: it peaked at number 9 on Bubbling Under Hot 100, and at number 92 on the Pop 100 chart. Cyrus performed the song on acoustic guitar as an encore at several stops on her first headlining concert tour, the Best of Both Worlds Tour (2007–08).

== Background ==
The singer had a very close relationship with her paternal grandfather, Ron Cyrus, a Democratic legislator in the state of Kentucky and public servant, whom she referred to as "Pappy". He was diagnosed with mesothelioma, a rare form of cancer that develops from the protective lining that covers many of the body's internal organs, and struggled with the illness for several years as result of exposure to asbestos. Cyrus then relocated from Franklin, Tennessee to Los Angeles, California to commence work on the Disney Channel original series Hannah Montana. Devastated by her grandfather's ailing health, Cyrus was inspired to compose "I Miss You". In her autobiography Miles to Go (2009), she explained, "That's how I ended up writing the song 'I Miss You' for Pappy. He was so sick. I knew he was dying, and slowly so did my heart. I couldn't imagine life without him." She co-wrote the song with her mother's friends Wendy Foy Green and Brian Green, and described it as the most difficult song for her write because of the subject matter. Cyrus attempted to halt writing "I Miss You", telling her co-writers she could not bear anymore.

However, Cyrus later desired to resume writing, saying she "knew what [her] heart wanted to say, and whatever is in [her] heart finds its way to [her] fingertips." Moreover, she desired for her grandfather to listen to the song before dying. Although Cyrus was unable to sing it for him, her father played a quick cut of "I Miss You" for Ron while on his deathbed. The singer said she liked to believe that the song gave her grandfather hope, in a similar fashion which he gave and continues to give hope to her. At the age of 70, Ron Cyrus died on February 28, 2006, two days prior the red carpet premiere of Hannah Montana. In the episode "She's a Supersneak", Cyrus performed a part of the song as Miley Stewart, in memory of the character's deceased mother. Cyrus then recorded the song for her debut album, Meet Miley Cyrus. The singer believed that, despite having personal significance to her, "I Miss You" could have a variety of meanings for distinct people in divergent situations, including moving away from home, the death of a parent, or an end in a romantic relationship.

== Composition ==
"I Miss You" (2007)
A sample of Miley Cyrus' "I Miss You", a tribute to her grandfather Ron Cyrus.

"I Miss You" is a pop song with a length of three minutes and fifty-eight seconds. It is a ballad that maintains low-key with an acoustic styling. "I Miss You" is influenced by elements of the country music genre; nevertheless, it has a rock music-based musical arrangement, relying prominently on a gentle strumming guitar for instrumentation. The song starts in the key of B♭ major but transposes to C major at the end of the bridge, "I Miss You" is set in common time with a tempo of 85 beats per minute. Cyrus' low and throaty vocals span a one octave, ranging from G_{3} to B♭_{4}. The song has the following chord progression, B♭–Gm_{7}–F–F–Fsus.

== Reception ==
=== Critical reception ===
"I Miss You" received generally positive reviews from music critics. Heather Phares of AllMusic complimented "I Miss You", and categorized it as one of the tracks on Meet Miley Cyrus that bared much resemblance to Hannah Montana songs. Andy Webster of The New York Times wrote that "I Miss You" is "as doleful as it gets". Andy Spletzer of the Seattle Post-Intelligencer believed the track had a level a sincerity that was void from the remainder of Cyrus' repertoire at the time. He added, "The songs are more guitar-driven, the outfits more adult, and the lyrics imply a string of bad boyfriends—but it feels like imaginary drama taken from high school poetry, as if she's pretending to be older than she is." In a similar note, Elysa Gardner of USA Today stated the song was the exception to the "heavy on flash and fantasy" that characterized Cyrus at the time. Joseph P. Kahn of The Boston Globe mentioned the song while remarking that Cyrus' songs surpass much of the music played on Radio Disney. Maitland McDonagh of TV Guide believed the track was a clear demonstration of how affectionate Cyrus was with her grandfather. Kelly Jane Torrance of The Washington Times said "I Miss You" was an unpredictable effort, which, according to her, was both empathetic and executed properly, from Cyrus.

=== Chart performance ===
On the week ending July 14, 2007, "I Miss You" debuted on two US Billboard charts. It entered at number nine on the Billboard Hot 100 extension, the Bubbling Under Hot 100 chart, and at number ninety-two in its only week on the Pop 100 chart. The following week, the song fell to number twenty-five in its second appearance on the Bubbling Under Hot 100 Singles chart.

== Live performances ==
Cyrus performed "I Miss You" as an encore on sporadic dates of her first headlining tour, the Best of Both Worlds Tour, which extended from October 2007 to January 2008. The tour's concert film uses the performance within the set, although it was not performed as such. The performance had Cyrus dressed in a white tank top, blue cardigan, and denim pants, and sole on the stage. She sat on a stool that placed towards the end of the runaway, performing with an acoustic guitar, as images and home footage of Ron Cyrus appeared on the screens. Chris William of Entertainment Weekly attended the November 8, 2007 concert at the San Diego Sports Arena in San Diego, and wrote, "So it was especially sweet when, for the encore, she ditched the dancers and enhancers and strummed an acoustic guitar on 'I Miss You'—and, for once, really looking and sounding 14. Not everyone noticed because, when she finished, half the seats were empty." Alison Bonaguro Dressed of the Chicago Tribune stated that, despite its simplicity, the performance on December 8, 2007, at the Allstate Arena in Rosemont, Illinois felt like as though it was the largest production of all. In a gray shirt and black pants, Cyrus performed the song, along with "Ready, Set, Don't Go" and "The Best of Both Worlds", on The Oprah Winfrey Show on December 20, 2007, as a screen displayed a light-blue background. On October 5, 2013, Cyrus and comedian Vanessa Bayer performed a snippet of "I Miss You" on a Saturday Night Live sketch.

== Charts ==
| Chart (2007) | Peak position |
|---|---|
| US Bubbling Under Hot 100 | 9 |
| US Pop 100 | 92 |

== Certification ==
| Region | Certification | Certified units/sales |
|---|---|---|
| United States (RIAA) | Gold | 500,000^{‡} |
^{‡} Sales+streaming figures based on certification alone.
