= My Friend Michael =

2011 memoir by Frank Cascio

My Friend Michael: An Ordinary Friendship with an Extraordinary Man
- Author: Frank Cascio
- Language: English
- Subject: Michael Jackson
- Genre: Memoir
- Publisher: Harper Collins, 2011
- Publication date: 15 Nov 2011
- Publication place: United States
- Pages: 373
- ISBN: 978-0-06-209008-9
- Dewey Decimal: 782.42166092
- LC Class: ML420.J175 C37 2011

My Friend Michael: An Ordinary Friendship with an Extraordinary Man is a 2011 memoir by Frank Cascio, co-written with Hilary Liftin. It is based on Cascio's long personal relationship with pop singer Michael Jackson, which began in his childhood and continued for more than twenty years.

The book offers a close, personal look at Jackson's private world. Cascio writes about spending time with him at his homes, travelling together, and being treated in what he describes as a family-like setting. Much of the memoir focuses on Jackson away from fame and public attention, as seen through Cascio's personal memories.
