= Breakout (Miley Cyrus album) =

2008 studio album by Miley Cyrus

Studio album by Miley Cyrus
- Released: July 22, 2008
- Genre: Pop rock
- Length: 39:44
- Label: Hollywood
- Producers: Rock Mafia; Scott Cutler; John Fields; Matthew Wilder; Anne Preven

Miley Cyrus chronology
| Best of Both Worlds Concert (2008) | Breakout (2008) | Hannah Montana: Hits Remixed (2008) |

Singles from Breakout
- 1. "7 Things" Released: June 17, 2008; 2. "See You Again (Rock Mafia Remix)" Released: August 11, 2008; 3. "Fly on the Wall" Released: November 4, 2008

Breakout is the second studio album by American singer Miley Cyrus, released on July 22, 2008, by Hollywood Records. Despite being her second album, it is her first record not affiliated with the television series Hannah Montana, as Meet Miley Cyrus was released as part of a joint album with her character. The majority of the record was composed as she traveled during her headlining Best of Both Worlds Tour (2007–08). Overall, Breakout is dominant on pop rock but explores a variety of other musical genres. Lyrical themes addressed in the album relate to breakups and coming of age. Most of the album was produced by Rock Mafia. Matthew Wiler and Scott Cutler also produced. Cyrus co-wrote eight out of thirteen tracks.

Breakout was met with generally favorable reception from music critics, though some believed the tracks were not a significant departure from the Hannah Montana franchise. The album encountered commercial success and introduced Cyrus in new countries. The album peaked at number one on the Billboard 200 for one week selling 370,000 copies, also becoming the third solo artist to chart on the Billboard 200 under age eighteen twice, and seventh overall. It is Cyrus' third album to do so, and was eventually certified platinum by the Recording Industry Association of America (RIAA). Elsewhere, Breakout topped the Canadian Albums Chart for two consecutive weeks and the Australian Albums Chart for one week. The album also charted within the top ten in Hungary, Italy, Japan, New Zealand, Spain and the United Kingdom.

Two singles were released from Breakout. "7 Things" was released on June 17, 2008, as the lead single from the album; it was commercially successful, reaching the top ten on charts in various countries. The second single, "Fly on the Wall" was released on November 4, 2008, as the final single.

== Background ==
"My new songs have a bit more of a different vibe. I finally got to, kinda, step out and do exactly what kind of sound I wanted to do. In my last record, I had to introduce myself and now that people already know who I am and know a little bit about me, this is just, you know, getting to know me personally."

— Cyrus speaking of the difference between Breakout and Meet Miley Cyrus.

Cyrus is a singer-songwriter and actress who starred as Miley Stewart, a girl with a secret double life as the popstar Hannah Montana, on the Disney Channel television series Hannah Montana. Through the television series, Cyrus developed fame as a teen idol and released music while being credited to Hannah Montana. Cyrus' debut studio album, titled Meet Miley Cyrus, was released as the second disc of the Hannah Montana 2: Meet Miley Cyrus (2007) double-disc album. Breakout is Cyrus' second studio album and her first not be affiliated with the Hannah Montana franchise, which was intended to be reflected by the title of the album. She believed it was her "breakout record", where she was going to "show everyone what Miley Cyrus is all about." Cyrus further explained the album was also appropriately titled because it portrayed her "stepping away from Hannah but just a little bit different." She also decided to title the album after the song "Breakout" because it was "one of [her] favorite songs".

Cyrus believed that compared to previous albums, Breakout was "grown-up" and "just a little more creative." Cyrus aimed to incorporate a sound influenced by rock music, saying "the writing is definitely different...the lyrics mean more than my last couple of records". According to Cyrus, the album documented, in depth, the events that occurred in her life in a year span. Most of the songs were written as Cyrus traveled on the Best of Both Worlds Tour from October 2007 to January 2008. In an interview for Billboard, Cyrus stated that she pushed herself even more to write the songs this time, saying that, “No matter how long what I’m doing here lasts, I want to be a songwriter for the rest of my life. I love it and it’s my escape. I just hope this record showcases that — more than anything — I’m a writer.”

Recording commenced immediately after the tour came to an end and ceased in March 2008 as Cyrus was to film Hannah Montana: The Movie (2009) in Tennessee soon after. She expressed that, through each song, a listener could discover something about her and about themselves. Of connecting with her fans through Breakout, she claimed she wanted "girls to feel to be able to feel empowered and just feel like they can kind of rock out", going on to say that, "listening to this music, I hope they can feel like a reason to dance and just smile and to have fun. This CD is totally age appropriate, specially for me".

== Development ==
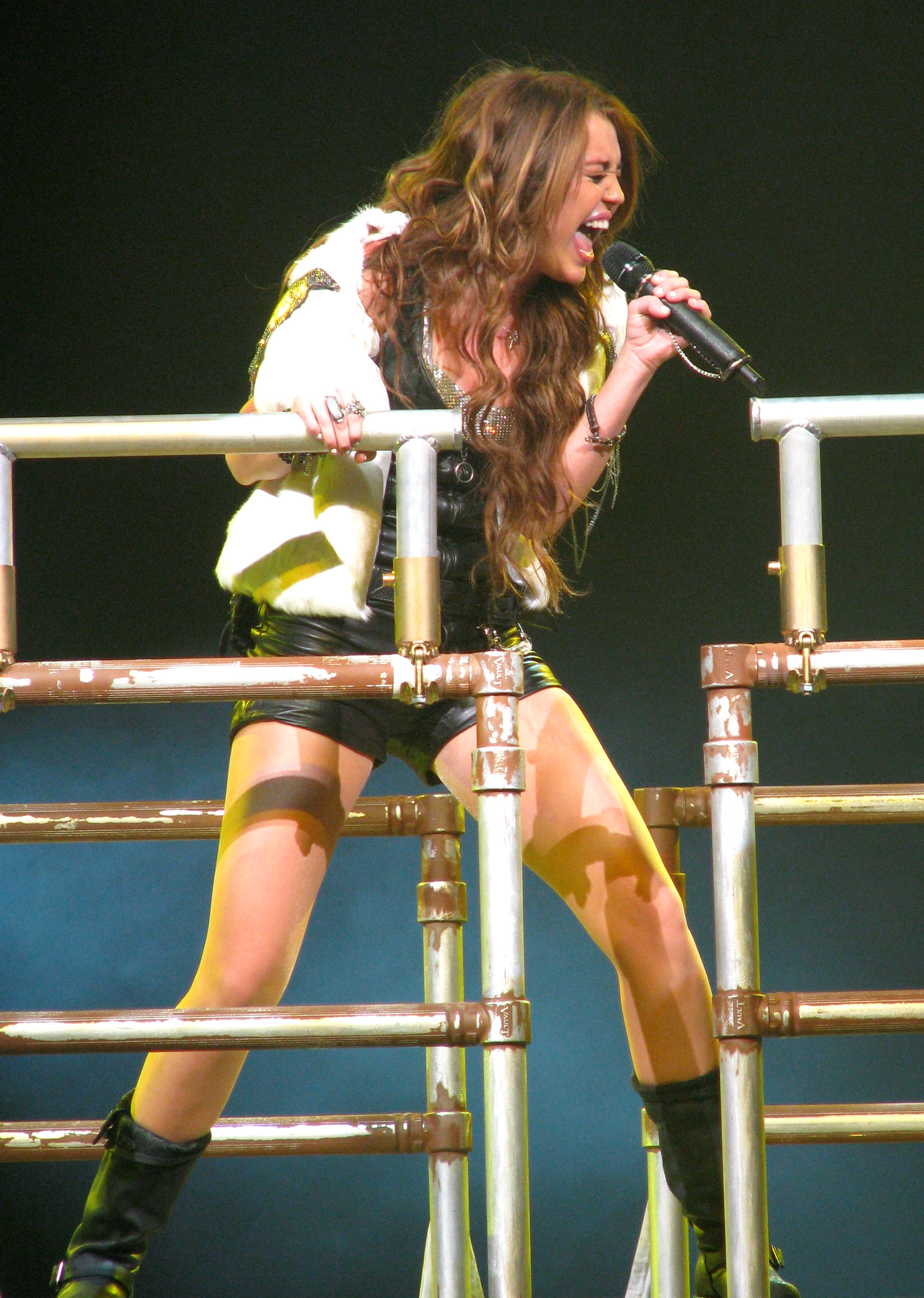
Cyrus performing "Breakout" on the Wonder World Tour (2009).

"Breakout" was written by Ted Bruner, in collaboration with Trey Vittetoe and Gina Schock of the Go-Go's. It was first recorded by American pop singer Katy Perry, for her second album One of the Boys (2008), though it was never included for the album and was passed on to Cyrus, on whose version Perry sings backing vocals. Like most songs on Breakout, Cyrus wrote "7 Things" while traveling on the Best of Both Worlds Tour, reflecting on her numerous emotions about an ex-boyfriend. She claimed her use of the word "hate" demonstrated how furious she was, at the time. Originally, "7 Things" was more "soft and nice" but Cyrus says she "went nuts" during the recording process and gave the song a harder sound. She decided to record a cover version of Cyndi Lauper's "Girls Just Want to Have Fun" from the album She's So Unusual (1983), after speaking with Lauper at the 50th Grammy Awards. The two singers were conversing about music, when Lauper stated, "Well, don't be scared of anything. People waste their lives being scared. Lasso the moon. But don't do it because someone tells you it's the right idea." Cyrus believed Lauper's saying encompassed the direction she wanted to take Breakout, ergo she covered "Girls Just Want to Have Fun". However, she desired for the cover to be completely different from other covers of "Girls Just Want to Have Fun" she heard. She described the process as "almost [having] to relearn the song." About the finished product, Cyrus said, "When you listen to the song, it's, like, you're not even sure what it is. It's something completely new." "Full Circle" was co-written by Cyrus, Scott Cutler, and Anne Preven about Cyrus' relationship with Nick Jonas of the Jonas Brothers. "It's about two people. They're always gonna come back together no matter what anyone says, the bad people that try to keep you apart", Cyrus said of the song's concept.

"Fly on the Wall" was written by Cyrus with the aid of Armato, James, and Devrim Karaoglu. "Fly on the Wall" was intended for the media, regarding "how they think they know everything about [her], when they don't. They want to be a fly on my wall and watch [her] 24/7." Cyrus explained it was about attempting to avoid paparazzi but they appeared, "not going away like little annoying flies." Cyrus was inspired to write "Bottom of the Ocean" by her deceased fish, Lyric and Melody, who died when Cyrus was eleven years of age. She said the topic drifted drastically once she began writing. "It's saying if there's someone you've loved but for some reason you can't love them anymore, you have to take your feelings, scoop them out, and put them at the bottom of the ocean." Cyrus, Armato, James, Aaron Dudley co-wrote "Wake Up America", a track about environmentalism. The song was directed towards "the people in the back seat", children of today's generation; she said that, in the future, they would be the ones "driving [the] Earth to what it's gonna be." "It's the only one you got, so you gotta take care of it. And if you don't, there's gonna be, maybe not for you, right then, and your generation but your kids and their kids ... Every generation has a cycle that'll carry on for the rest of eternity", she concluded. Cyrus recorded a cover of Cheyenne Kimball's "Four Walls" from the album The Day Has Come (2006) for Breakout, titled "These Four Walls". The twelfth and final track is a remixed version of the hit "See You Again", referred to as the Rock Mafia Remix and the 2008 Remix; "See You Again" was originally released on the Meet Miley Cyrus disc of Hannah Montana 2: Meet Miley Cyrus.

== Composition ==
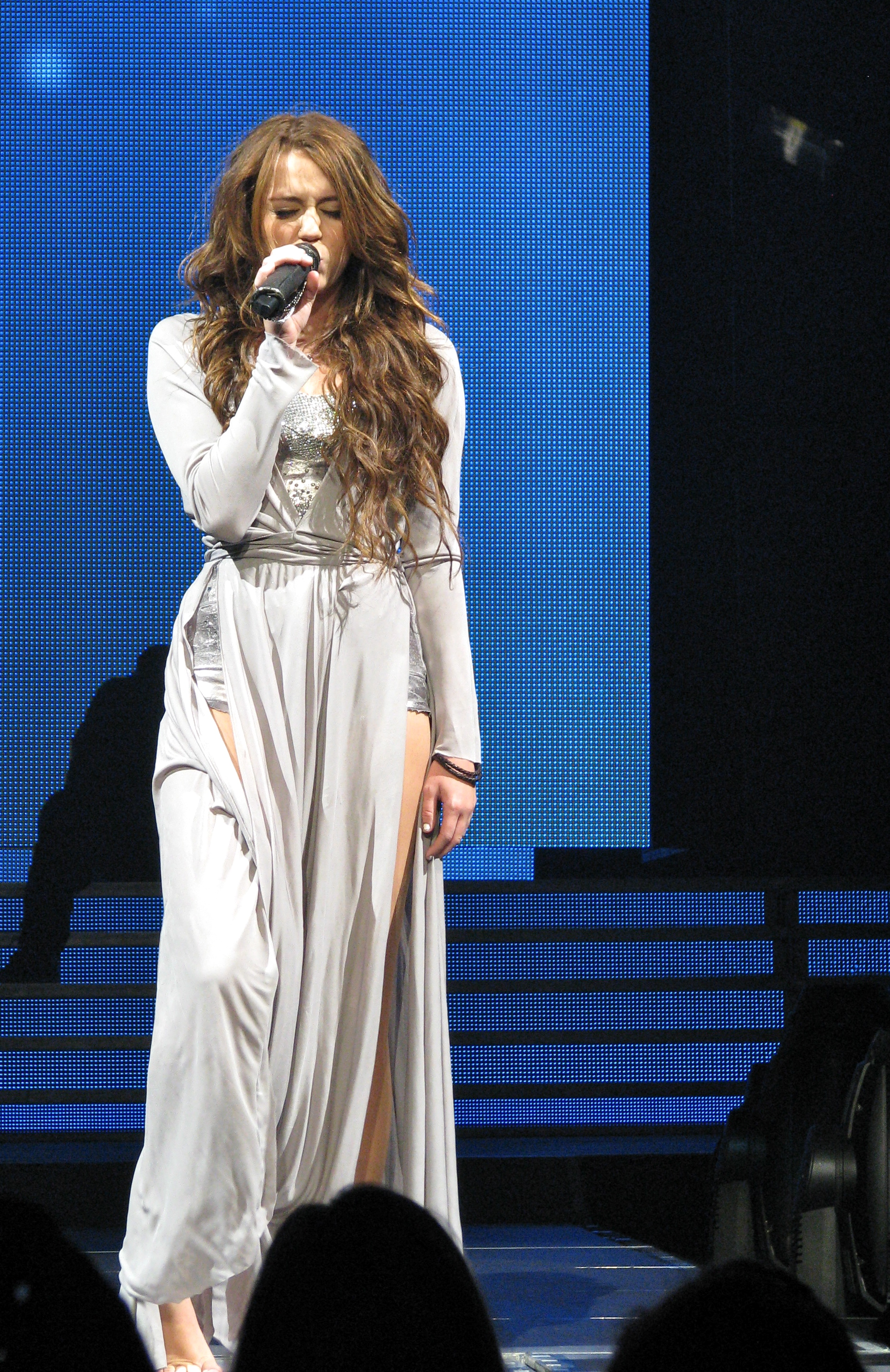
Cyrus performing "Bottom of the Ocean" on the Wonder World Tour

Overall, Breakout is dominant on pop rock but explores a variety of other musical genres. The opening track, "Breakout", is a dance-pop number that begins with a fast beat, composed of chiming electric guitar and drums and later progresses to "the snares skip and the keyboards shimmer"; "ecstatic beats" pummel throughout. The song's lyrics are "a girls-only call to fun" that anecdote on feelings about coming of age and the desire to be school-free. The uptempo refrains of "7 Things" are pop punk influenced. The song is "a three-tempo patchwork quilt", transitioning "from sensitive breakup song in the strummy verses to punky-pop kiss-off in the double-time choruses." "7 Things"' lyrics list seven traits Cyrus hates about an ex-boyfriend. "The Driveway" is a power ballad whose lyrics regard a breakup, insisting "nothing hurts like losing when you know it's really gone." The cover of Cyndi Lauper's "Girls Just Wanna Have Fun" replaces the subtle reggae undercurrent in the original version with a more rock music driven sound that includes pop punk beats and string stabs. The lyrics of "Girls Just Wanna Have Fun" primarily discuss the "desire to let loose with one's friends", touching upon details of the life of an overworked child star. The song "Full Circle" is composed of several pop rock hooks; in one of the hooks, Cyrus finishes various words with "Oh, oh, oh!". The lyrics describe not quitting a relationship.

"Fly on the Wall" is prominently an electropop song that is also composed of a number of hooks, which yell the song's title, while the instrumentation relies on electric guitars. Unlike other songs on Breakout, "Fly on the Wall" has Cyrus' voice processed to sound different. The song's lyrics taunt "the listener for being on the outside of her inner sanctum". The target of the message has been interpreted differently by contemporary critics – an ex-boyfriend and the media have most commonly been referred to. "Bottom of the Ocean" is a contemporary ballad that contains a sound reflecting influences from minimalist music. The backdrop for the "feel-bad" love song features ocean wave sounds. The track "Wake Up America" has a "cheeky riff-rock backdrop" as its, while its lyrical content concerns environmentalism, where Cyrus mainly pleads for audiences to give the Earth "just a little attention". In the first verse, she "admits that she doesn't know exactly what's up with this global warming but believes there's something we should all do about it". "These Four Walls" is a power ballad accented with country pop elements and twangy vocals and lyrics which speak of an interior narrative. "Simple Song" has "bile" sound and is lyrically about moments in coming of age where a person "can't tell which way is up, which way is down" and they feel the need to alienate themselves. In "Goodbye", Cyrus' vocal performance is more "roosty" with a more "natural-sounding accompaniment" while, in the lyrics, she finds her remembering the "simple things ... until [she cries]." "See You Again" (Rock Mafia Remix) is dance-pop number, fusing sultry vocals with techno beats. The track has Cyrus detailing previous scenes and plans to redeem herself.

== Singles ==
"7 Things" was released on June 17, 2008, as the lead single from Breakout, through digital distribution. Following the song's release, allegations sparked that it was about Nick Jonas of the Jonas Brothers, which Cyrus neither confirmed nor denied. It received mixed reviews from contemporary critics, several of which compared Cyrus to Avril Lavigne. "7 Things" enjoyed worldwide commercial success, becoming a top ten hit on charts in Australia, Japan, Norway, and the United States. The single was certified gold by the Australian Recording Industry Association (ARIA). The song's accompanying music video was directed by Brett Ratner and features Cyrus performing the song with a back-up band as many teenage girls lipsync along.

"Fly on the Wall" was released on November 4, 2008, as the second and final single from the album. "Fly on the Wall" received critical praise; several critics claiming it defied teen pop expectations and was Breakout's best track. However, the song failed to match success of "7 Things", reaching its highest peak at number sixteen on the UK Singles Chart. Its music video was directed by Philip Andelman. Inspired by Michael Jackson's Thriller, the video depicts Cyrus attempting to escape the paparazzi, as they follow her in a parking garage.

=== Other songs ===
A Rock Mafia remix version of "See You Again" was released August 11, 2008 only in countries where the original version was not. The remix was received well by critics for properly combining vocals and music. The remix expanded the success of "See You Again", appearing on charts in Austria, Belgium (Flanders), Germany, Ireland, and the United Kingdom. "See You Again" (Rock Mafia Remix) was given a promotional music video, taken from a performance at the 2008 Disney Channel Games.

== Promotion ==
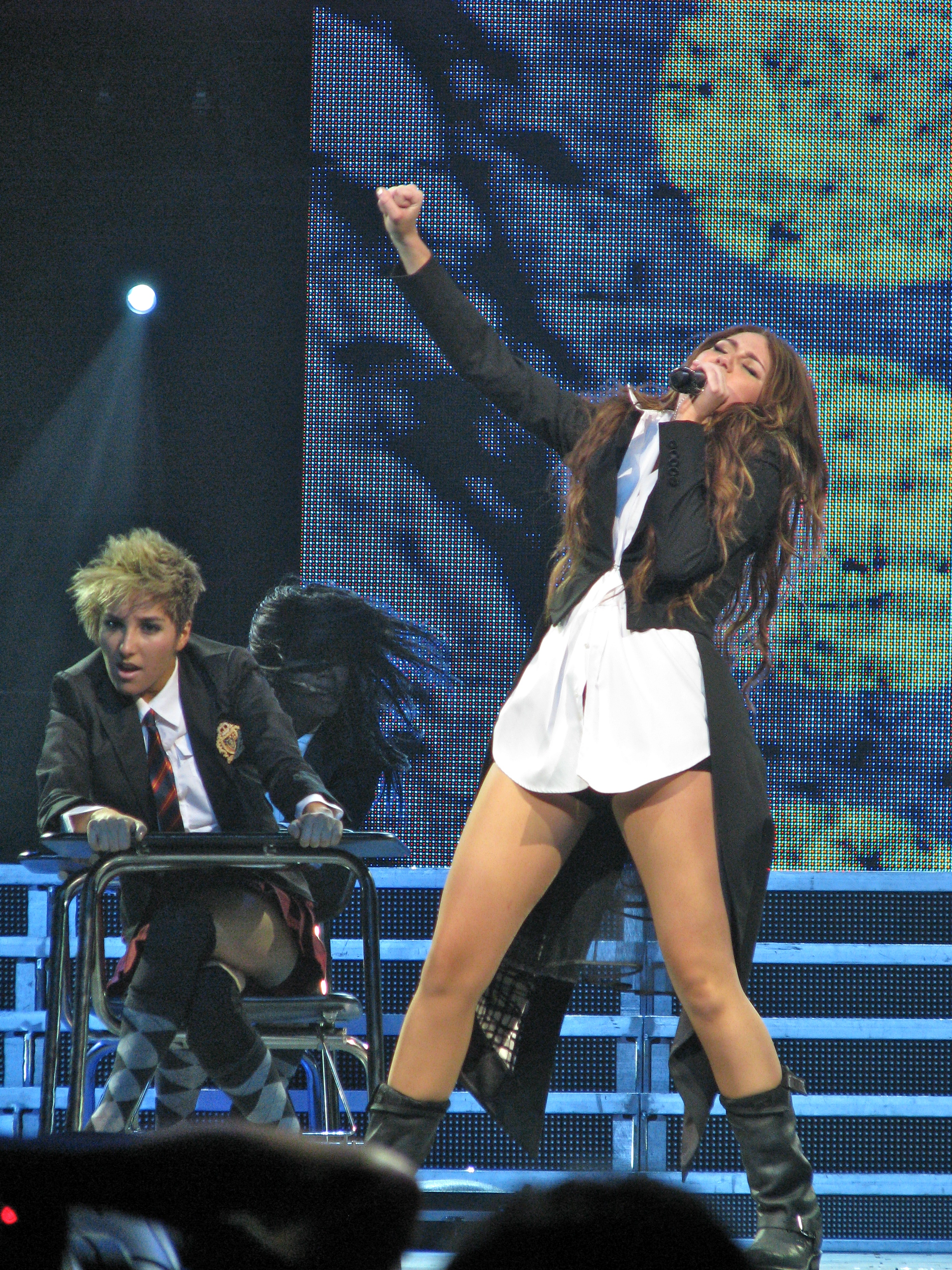
Cyrus performing "Simple Song" on the Wonder World Tour

The promotion plan was centered on massive performances and interviews to television, radio, and magazines. It was formulated to not be aggressive to give Cyrus a period of rest, after doing many consecutive projects. Cyrus explained,

"I'm a kid. That's why, for the most part, we only did the big publicity and otherwise decided to let the album whatever it was going to do. It was so weird not to do everything in my power to promote my first album under my own name. I am very proud of it and love what we came up with. But I also had to accept the reality of my situation. So much is happening all at once, so many opportunities. I want to make the most of them, but I also need to stay sane. There will be a day, my parents constantly remind me, when I won't have so much going on. And when that day comes, I don't want to feel like an empty shell of a person."

Cyrus first performed songs from Breakout, the title track, "Fly on the Wall", and "See You Again" (Rock Mafia Remix), at the opening ceremony of the 2008 Disney Channel Games on May 3, 2008. Her first live performance of "7 Things" took place on May 17, 2008 at the 2008 Zootopia, an annual summer concert put on by radio station Z100. Later that summer, she promoted Breakout at outdoor concerts hosted by Good Morning America and The Today Show, while hosting the 2008 Teen Choice Awards, and at FNMTV. Cyrus began promotion for Breakout in Europe in fall 2008, performing the track on the United Kingdom channel GMTV, the French television show Le Grand Journal, and the British singing competition The X Factor among other venues. Cyrus performed several songs from album on April 24, 2009 in a London Apple Store. These performances were recorded and sold exclusively by the United Kingdom iTunes Store as a live extended play (EP) titled iTunes Live from London.

Well over a year after the Breakout's release, Cyrus embarked on her second concert tour, the Wonder World Tour, to promote the album and The Time of Our Lives extended play (EP). The tour was Cyrus' first to not have her costumed as Hannah Montana and was announced in June 2009, with dates revealed for American venues. Dates for venues in the United Kingdom were later announced. In to order to avoid the extensive scalping that occurred during the Best of Both Worlds Tour, all tickets were sold exclusively through paperless ticket delivery, which would require audiences to bring identification to gain entry into the concert. The tour expanded from September to December 2009, with a total of fifty-six concerts in North America and Europe. The tour received positive to mixed reviews from critics. Some praised it and deemed it a spectacle, while others believed it lacked profundity and portrayal of Cyrus' personality. The Wonder World Tour managed to gross over $67.1 million, $15 million which were earned by the singer. The entire European leg sold out within ten minutes, and, at one stop, Cyrus broke the record for the largest attendance at The O_{2} Arena in London, England with an audience of 16,196. A concert film was released on the limited, deluxe edition of her third studio album Can't Be Tamed (2010).

== Critical reception ==
Professional ratings
Aggregate scores
| Source | Rating |
|---|---|
| Metacritic | 66/100 |
Review scores
| Source | Rating |
| Allmusic | 3.5/5 stars |
| Billboard | (positive) |
| The Boston Globe | (positive) |
| Entertainment Weekly | B |
| Los Angeles Times | 3/4 stars |
| The New York Times | (mixed) |
| PopMatters | (5/10) |
| Slant Magazine | 2.5/5 stars |
| Yahoo! Music | 7/10 stars |

Breakout received generally positive reviews, earning a collective score of 66 out of 100 on Metacritic. Heather Phares of Allmusic commented that Breakout's title expresses its "purpose nicely" though the music was not drastically different from Hannah Montana's, adding, "only a handful of songs truly break out from the Montana mold". Though not being impressed by "nothing [being] left to chance", she concluded, "Even if these songs are derivative of much more established pop divas [Avril Lavigne and Britney Spears], they provide clues to the kind of company Cyrus aims to keep. And while Breakout isn't as much of a breakthrough as it could be, it still moves Miley closer to an identity and career outside of Hannah." Kerri Mason of Billboard wrote, "While it's still age-appropriate for minors, Breakout is for the big kids too" and complimented Cyrus for being a "natural-born popstar." Sarah Rodman of The Boston Globe felt Cyrus mostly succeeded while "trying to please most of the people most of the time" on Breakout. She summarized, "With Breakout, Cyrus has clearly made a choice to break from the shiny, happy 'Hannah Montana' character, but she hasn't scuffed her sound up so much that her fans won't recognize that she's just being Miley." Chris William of Entertainment Weekly graded the album a B and noted that the first half of the album was "fun" but the second half became "overly ballad-heavy," assuming that was the more mature side of Cyrus she had promised. Miakel Wood of the Los Angeles Times stated, "In that respect, Breakout is unlikely fodder for the razzle-dazzle road shows and 3-D concert films to come. As a portrait of the artist as a young malcontent, though, it's rarely less than fascinating."

Ben Ratliff of The New York Times said Cyrus' attempt to leave Hannah Montana was weak, only being driven by "more gray thoughts". Ratliff continued, "She eases up on songs with total-affirmation chants about being the captain of her ship ... The lyrics are half-terrible — almost too realistic as teenage thoughts — but the best of them transmit the desired message ... It’s a lackluster album, floated by two or three strong singles." Josh Timmermann of PopMatters believed Breakout was "a just-okay teenpop record with audible suggestions of said singer-songwriter aspirations. To be sure, it’s a stronger collection of songs than Moms and Dads with upturned noses ... would probably expect." Sal Cinquemani of Slant Magazine rated the album two and half stars out of five, being disappointed and deeming the songs not to be a "worthy follow-up" to "See You Again". Cinquemani finished, "For teen-pop, your kid could do worse. You know, like Avril [Lavigne]". Mordechai Shinefield of The Village Voice wrote, "If her lyrical prowess hasn't caught up to her voice yet, that should only hold promise of things to come. She's a rare talent; now she only has to survive until adulthood." Ash Dosanjh of Yahoo! Music gave Breakout seven stars out of ten and referred to Cyrus, in Breakout, as the ideal of the American Dream: "a combination of hard work, good Christian living and un-smutty pop".

In 2017, close to the release of Cyrus' sixth studio album Younger Now, Dan Weiss wrote a critical article for Billboard claiming that Breakout was possibly still Cyrus' best work yet. He claimed that the artist "hasn't necessarily made her best albums during the height of her making headlines" and that the record "was from a simpler time, devoid of thinkpiece fodder or teachable moments". The writer also stated that the album's "final third is a bit too dominated by ballads, but the rest of it is shiny dynamite" pointing that there were two "works of genius" on it: "7 Things" saying that "teen pop has rarely sounded this 'teen' in the years since, and Cyrus' vocal tugs at all the right strings" and "Girls Just Wanna Have Fun" which he wrote "does exactly what a cover should: breathes new life into a tune you thought you couldn't possibly know new things about". Concluding the article, Weiss wrote that Breakout's songs "moved like an arena-rock band fronted by a teenage Pat Benatar, with hammering drum fills and synth accents aplenty".

== Commercial performance ==
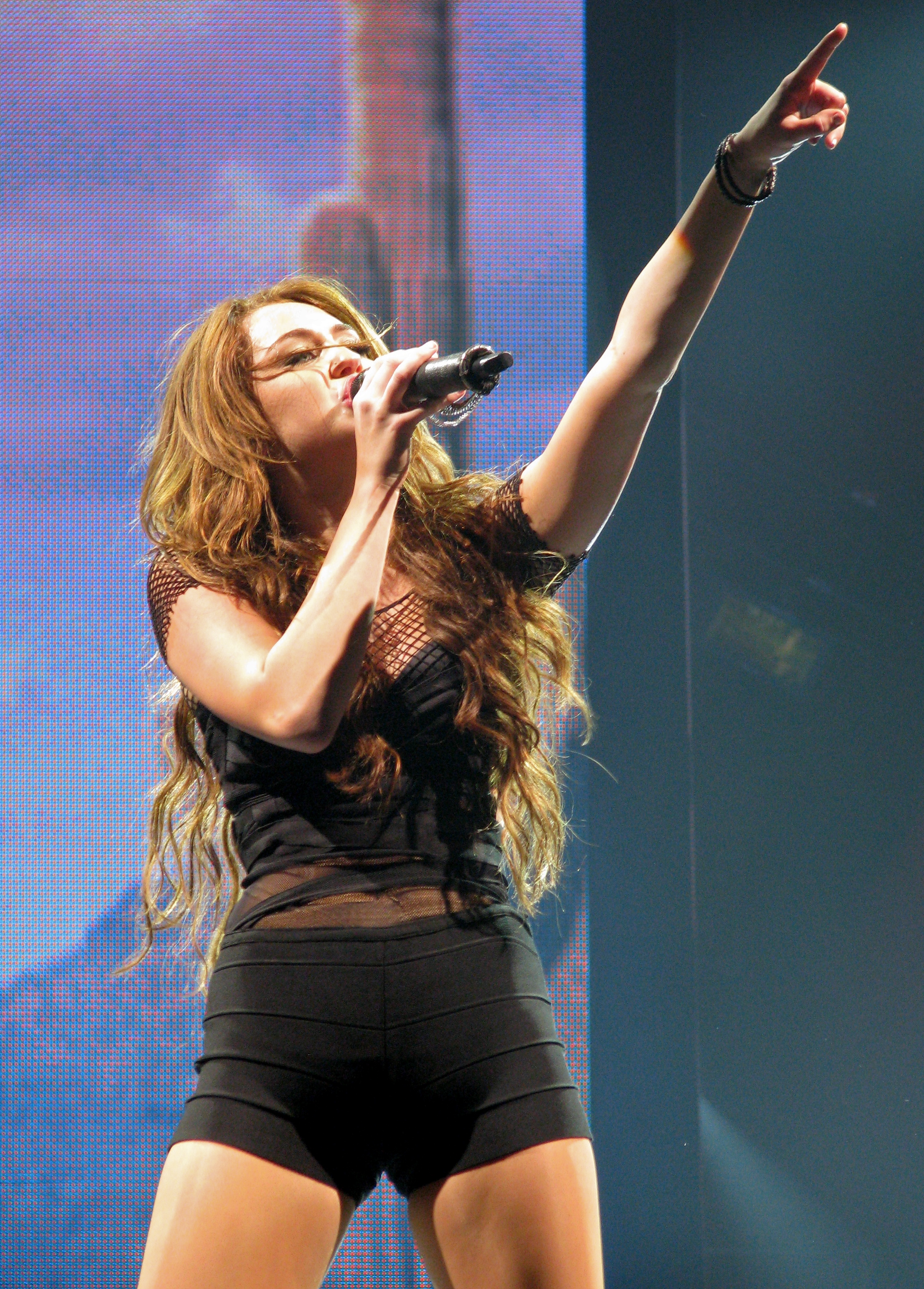
Cyrus performing "Wake Up America" on the Wonder World Tour

On the week ending August 8, 2008, Breakout debuted at number-one on the Billboard 200, thus earning Cyrus a third number-one album on the chart – including albums fully credited to Hannah Montana; the album sold 371,000 copies in its debut week, becoming the fourth-highest sales week of 2008 for a female artist. The following week, Breakout descended to number two, selling 163,000 copies. The album spent a total of forty-eight weeks on the Billboard 200. It was certified double-platinum by the Recording Industry Association of America (RIAA) for shipments exceeding two million copies. According to Nielsen SoundScan, the album has sold 1.6 million copies in the United States as of July 2013. Due to sales of 27,000 copies, Breakout entered at number-one on the Canadian Albums Chart on the week ending August 8, 2008, maintaining the top spot for two consecutive weeks.

On the week ending September 14, 2008, the album entered the Australian Albums Chart at number two. In the succeeding week, it moved to number-one, where it only stayed for a week. Breakout was certified gold by the Australian Recording Industry Association (ARIA) for shipments exceeding 35,000 copies. Breakout debuted at number four on the New Zealand Albums Chart on the week ending September 8, 2008. On the week ending October 13, 2008, the album reached its peak at number two on the New Zealand Albums Chart, a position it maintained for two consecutive weeks. Breakout was certified platinum by the Recording Industry Association of New Zealand (RIANZ) for the shipment of more than 15,000 copies. In Japan, it peaked at number ten.

On the week ending September 13, 2008, the album entered and peaked at number ten on the UK Albums Chart, becoming Cyrus' first top ten album in the country. It was certified platinum by the British Phonographic Industry (BPI) for the shipment of 300,000 copies. In Ireland, Breakout peaked at number eleven and was certified platinum by the Irish Recorded Music Association (IRMA) for shipments exceeding 15,000 copies. In mainland Europe, Breakout peaked at number twenty-eight on the European Top 100 Albums Chart, number twelve on the Austrian Albums Chart, number six on the Italian Albums Chart, and number sixteen on the German Albums Chart. On the week ending September 21, 2008, the album debuted at number twenty-six on the Spanish Albums Chart and, after twenty-six weeks of ascending and descending the chart, it reached its peak at number seven. The album was certified gold by the Productores de Música de España (PROMUSICAE) for the shipment of more than 30,000 copies. Breakout experienced similar commercial outcomes throughout the rest of Europe; it charted within the top twenty on charts in Finland, Norway, and Poland.

== Track listing ==
Breakout track listing
| No. | Title | Writer(s) | Producer(s) | Length |
|---|---|---|---|---|
| 1. | "Breakout" | Gina Schock; Ted Bruner; Trey Vittetoe | Scott Cutler; Anne Preven | 3:25 |
| 2. | "7 Things" | Miley Cyrus; Antonina Armato; Tim James | John Fields | 3:34 |
| 3. | "The Driveway" | Cutler; Preven; Cyrus | Cutler; Preven | 3:42 |
| 4. | "Girls Just Wanna Have Fun" | Robert Hazard | Matthew Wilder | 3:07 |
| 5. | "Full Circle" | Cutler; Preven; Cyrus | Cutler; Preven | 3:15 |
| 6. | "Fly on the Wall" | Cyrus; Armato; James; Devrim Karaoglu | Armato; James; Karaoglu (co.) | 2:32 |
| 7. | "Bottom of the Ocean" | Cyrus; Armato; James | Armato; James; Karaoglu (co.) | 3:15 |
| 8. | "Wake Up America" | Cyrus; Armato; James; Aaron Dudley; Karaoglu (add.) | Armato; James | 2:45 |
| 9. | "These Four Walls" | Cutler; Preven; Cheyenne Kimball | Cutler; Preven | 3:26 |
| 10. | "Simple Song" | Jeffrey Steele; Jesse Littleton | Armato; James; Karaoglu (add.) | 3:33 |
| 11. | "Goodbye" | Cyrus; Armato; James | Armato; James; Karaoglu (add.) | 3:53 |
| 12. | "See You Again" (Rock Mafia Remix) | Cyrus; Armato; James | Armato; James; Karaoglu (co.) | 3:17 |
| Total length: | | | | 39:44 |

Platinum edition bonus tracks
| No. | Title | Writer(s) | Producer(s) | Length |
|---|---|---|---|---|
| 13. | "Hovering" | Armato; James | Armato; James | 2:29 |
| 14. | "Someday" | Cyrus; Armato; James; Karaoglu | Armato; James; Karaoglu (co.) | 3:03 |
| Total length: | | | | 45:16 |

Platinum edition bonus DVD
| No. | Title | Length |
|---|---|---|
| 1. | "7 Things" (Music Video) | 3:39 |
| 2. | "Making of '7 Things'" | 2:31 |
| 3. | "7 Things" (Live at Clear Channel Stripped) | 3:34 |
| 4. | "The Driveway" (Live at Clear Channel Stripped) | 3:49 |
| 5. | "Simple Song" (Live at Clear Channel Stripped) | 3:46 |
| 6. | "See You Again" (Live at Clear Channel Stripped) | 3:31 |
| 7. | "Breakout" (Live at 2008 Disney Channel Games) | 3:13 |
| 8. | "Fly on the Wall" (Live at 2008 Disney Channel Games) | 2:42 |
| 9. | "See You Again" (Live at 2008 Disney Channel Games) | 3:25 |
| 10. | "Miley, Music & More" | 3:01 |

Notes

- The Japan edition includes two bonus remixes of "7 Things" (EK's Baleric Mix, and Daishi Dance Remix), and a bonus DVD which includes the "7 Things" music video, "See You Again" live performance at 2008 Disney Channel Games, and "Miley, Music & More".
- "Girls Just Wanna Have Fun" is a cover of the song by Cyndi Lauper, which was originally released in 1983.
- "These Four Walls" is a cover of the song by Cheyenne Kimball, which was originally released in 2006.

== Personnel ==
Credits adapted from the liner notes of Breakout.

- Pete Anderson – additional engineering (2)
- Rusty Anderson – guitars (1, 3, 5, 9)
- Tommy Barbarella – keyboards (2)
- Michael Bland – drums (2)
- Paul Bushnell – bass guitar (1, 3–5, 9)
- Scott Campbell – engineer (4)
- Ken Chastain – percussion (2)
- Dorian Crozier – drums (8, 10–12)
- Miley Cyrus – lead vocals, background vocals (4)
- Aaron Dudley – guitars (6, 7)
- Mark Endert – mixing (9)
- John Fields – engineer, bass guitar, keyboards, guitars, background vocals, and programming (2)
- Josh Freese – drums (1, 3, 5, 9)
- Steve Hammons – engineer and mix engineer (6–8, 10, 11), drum programming (7)
- James Harrah – guitar (4)
- Sean Hurley – bass guitar (6–8, 10–12)
- Tim Jamese – string and horn arrangements (8, 10), digital editing (6–8, 10–12)
- Parker Jayne – hang drum (7)
- Enny Joo – art direction, design
- Devrìm Karaoglu – drum programming (6, 7), keyboards (6–8, 10), string and horn arrangements (8, 10), additional elements (12)
- Abe Laboriel, Jr. – drums (4)
- David Levita – guitar (9)
- Jon Lind – A&R, background vocals (2)
- Chris Lord-Alge – mixing (2, 3, 5)
- Stephen Lu – string arrangement and keyboards (2)
- Nigel Lundemo – engineer (6–8, 10, 11), digital editing (6–8, 10–12)
- Gavin MacKillop – engineer (1, 3, 5, 9)
- Paul Mitchell – engineer (10)
- Jason Morey – executive producer
- Jamie Muhoberac – piano (10, 12)
- Sheryl Nields – photography
- Clif Norrell – mixing (1)
- William Owsley III – guitars, mandolin, and background vocals (2)
- Paul Palmer – mixing (6–8, 10–12)
- Christi Parker – A&R
- Katy Perry – background vocals (1, 3)
- Tim Pierce – guitars (2, 6–8, 10–12)
- Anne Preven – background vocals (5, 9)
- Zac Rae – keyboards (1, 3, 5, 9)
- Gina Schock – background vocals (1)
- David Snow – creative director
- Ryan Star – background vocals (3)
- Heather Sturm – additional engineering (2)
- Robert Vosgien – mastering
- Windy Wagner – background vocals (6, 7)
- Cindy Warden – A&R
- Matthew Wilder – mixing, engineer, keyboards, and programming (4)
- Regina Williams – background vocals (4)
- Terry Wood – background vocals (4)
- Gigi Worth – background vocals (4)

== Charts ==
=== Weekly charts ===
| Chart (2008) | Peak position |
|---|---|
| Argentine Albums (CAPIF) | 19 |
| Australian Albums (ARIA) | 1 |
| Austrian Albums (Ö3 Austria) | 12 |
| Belgian Albums (Ultratop Flanders) | 38 |
| Belgian Albums (Ultratop Wallonia) | 42 |
| Canadian Albums (Billboard) | 1 |
| Czech Albums Chart | 32 |
| Danish Albums (Hitlisten) | 27 |
| European Top 100 Albums | 28 |
| Finnish Albums (Suomen virallinen lista) | 28 |
| French Albums (SNEP) | 30 |
| German Albums (Offizielle Top 100) | 16 |
| Hungarian Albums Chart | 7 |
| Irish Albums (IRMA) | 11 |
| Italian Albums (FIMI) | 6 |
| Japanese Albums Chart | 10 |
| Mexican Albums (Top 100 Mexico) | 23 |
| New Zealand Albums (RMNZ) | 2 |
| Norwegian Albums (VG-lista) | 15 |
| Polish Album Chart | 15 |
| Scottish Albums (Official Charts) | 11 |
| Spanish Albums (Promusicae) | 7 |
| Swiss Albums (Schweizer Hitparade) | 25 |
| UK Albums (Official Charts) | 10 |
| US Billboard 200 | 1 |

=== Year-end charts ===
| Chart (2008) | Position |
|---|---|
| Australian Albums (ARIA) | 19 |
| Austrian Albums (Ö3 Austria) | 74 |
| Canadian Albums (Billboard) | 17 |
| European Albums (Billboard) | 88 |
| Hungarian Albums (MAHASZ) | 86 |
| New Zealand Albums (RMNZ) | 14 |
| UK Albums (OCC) | 91 |
| US Billboard 200 | 32 |
| Worldwide Albums (IFPI) | 23 |

| Chart (2009) | Position |
|---|---|
| European Albums (Billboard) | 78 |
| German Albums (Offizielle Top 100) | 78 |
| Spanish Albums (PROMUSICAE) | 50 |
| UK Albums (OCC) | 138 |
| US Billboard 200 | 76 |

== Certifications ==
| Region | Certification | Certified units/sales |
|---|---|---|
| Australia (ARIA) | Platinum | 70,000^{^} |
| Austria (IFPI Austria) | Gold | 10,000^{*} |
| GCC (IFPI Middle East) | Gold | 3,000^{*} |
| Germany (BVMI) | Gold | 100,000^{^} |
| Ireland (IRMA) | Platinum | 15,000^{^} |
| New Zealand (RMNZ) | 2× Platinum | 30,000^{‡} |
| Poland (ZPAV) | Gold | 10,000^{*} |
| Spain (Promusicae) | Platinum | 80,000^{^} |
| United Kingdom (BPI) | Platinum | 300,000^{^} |
| United States (RIAA) | 2× Platinum | 2,000,000^{^} |
^{*} Sales figures based on certification alone.^{^} Shipments figures based on certification alone.^{‡} Sales+streaming figures based on certification alone.

== Works cited ==
- Cyrus, Miley; Liftin, Hilary (2009). Miles to Go. New York City: Hyperion Books. ISBN 978-1-4231-1992-0.
