= Hannah Montana 2: Non-Stop Dance Party =

2008 remix album by Hannah Montana

Remix album / soundtrack album by Hannah Montana
- Released: January 29, 2008
- Length: 40:09
- Label: Walt Disney
- Producer: Chris Cox

Miley Cyrus chronology
Hannah Montana 2: Meet Miley Cyrus (2007)	Hannah Montana 2: Non-Stop Dance Party (2008)	Best of Both Worlds Concert (2008)

Hannah Montana 2: Non-Stop Dance Party is the first remix album for the Disney Channel series Hannah Montana. All tracks are performed by the series' titular character Hannah Montana, portrayed by American singer and actress Miley Cyrus. It was released by Walt Disney Records on January 29, 2008. The album contains remixes from the series' second soundtrack album Hannah Montana 2 (2007).

The CD version includes the bonus track "Chris Cox Megamix", live performance videos of the songs "Nobody's Perfect" and "Life's What You Make It" from the London concert, a photo slideshow, and printable party invitations. The official Walt Disney Records website created the Hannah Montana: Make-a-Mix game to promote the remix album. The album sold 40,000 copies in its first week.

== Track listing ==
- All tracks from the standard edition are remixed by Chris Cox.

Hannah Montana 2: Non-Stop Dance Party track listing
No.	Title	Length
1.	"One in a Million"	4:49
2.	"True Friend"	3:01
3.	"Old Blue Jeans"	3:21
4.	"Make Some Noise"	4:36
5.	"Nobody's Perfect"	3:56
6.	"Rock Star"	3:41
7.	"Life's What You Make It"	3:26
8.	"We Got the Party"	4:21
9.	"You and Me Together"	3:51
10.	"Bigger than Us"	3:55
11.	"Chris Cox Megamix"	3:12

United States Walmart edition bonus track
No.	Title	Length
12.	"This Is the Life" (Marco Marinangeli Remix)	2:50

DVD track list
No.	Title	Length
1.	"Nobody's Perfect" (Live from London)	3:20
2.	"Life's What You Make It" (Live from London)	3:11
3.	"Photo Slideshow"	1:57

== Charts ==
=== Weekly charts ===
Weekly chart performance for Hannah Montana 2: Non-Stop Dance Party
Chart (2008)	Peak position
US Billboard 200	7
US Dance/Electronic Albums	1
US Top Kid Audio	1

=== Year-end charts ===
Year-end chart performance for Hannah Montana 2: Non-Stop Dance Party
Chart (2008)	Rank
US Dance/Electronic Albums (Billboard)	3
US Kid Albums (Billboard)	9

== Certifications ==
Certifications for Hannah Montana 2: Non-Stop Dance Party
Region	Certification	Certified units/sales
Brazil (Pro-Música Brasil)	Gold	30,000^{*}
^{*} Sales figures based on certification alone.
