= Hannah Montana & Miley Cyrus: Best of Both Worlds Concert =

- Theatrical release poster
- Directed by: Bruce Hendricks
- Produced by: Art Repola
- Starring: Miley Cyrus; Jonas Brothers; Kenny Ortega; Billy Ray Cyrus
- Cinematography: Mitchell Amundsen
- Edited by: Michael Tronick
- Music by: Matthew Gerrard; Robbie Nevil; Miley Cyrus; Jamie Houston; Tim James
- Production company: Walt Disney Pictures
- Distributed by: Walt Disney Studios; Motion Pictures
- Release date: February 1, 2008
- Running time: 75 minutes 82 minutes (extended cut)
- Country: United States
- Language: English
- Budget: $7 million
- Box office: $70.6 million($106 million in 2025 dollars)

Hannah Montana & Miley Cyrus: Best of Both Worlds Concert is a 2008 American concert comedy film produced and released by Walt Disney Pictures presented in Disney Digital 3-D. It was first released in the United States and Canada for one week beginning on February 1, 2008. The film is directed by Bruce Hendricks and produced by Art Repola.

The world television premiere on Disney Channel was on July 26, 2008. The Disney Channel premiere brought 5.9 million viewers.

== Songs ==
=== As Hannah Montana ===
1. "Rock Star"
2. "Life's What You Make It"
3. "Just Like You"
4. "Nobody's Perfect"
5. "Pumpin' Up the Party" (not in the theatrical release)
6. "I Got Nerve"
7. "We Got the Party" (featuring Jonas Brothers)

=== Jonas Brothers ===
1. "When You Look Me in the Eyes"
2. "Year 3000"

=== As Miley Cyrus ===
1. "Start All Over"
2. "See You Again"
3. "Let's Dance"
4. "Right Here" (not in the theatrical release)
5. "I Miss You"
6. "G.N.O. (Girl's Night Out)"
7. "The Best of Both Worlds" (featuring Hannah Montana)

== Release ==
=== Theatrical ===
The film began a week-long engagement in 683 theaters on February 1, 2008. In its opening weekend, it grossed $31.1 million. As of 2022, it continues to be the most successful Super Bowl weekend opening, a particularly barren spot in the winter dump months of the movie-release calendar.

=== Home media ===
The DVD arrived on both formats in America on August 19, 2008. The DVD, a 2-Disc Extended Edition, includes an 82-minute cut in both 2D and 3D viewing modes. Bonus features on both include behind-the-scenes footage with Miley, Billy Ray, and the Jonas Brothers; a sing-along mode, and "total concert immersion through 3D viewing capability". The DVD contains a Dolby 5.1 track and both full-screen and anamorphic widescreen formats, while Blu-ray goes 16x9 only and delivers DTS-HD MA 7.1 surround sound, one of the first Blu-ray releases to have that specific surround sound. Recalling the successful theatrical gimmick, the home video releases were vowed to be sold "for a limited time only". The DVD and Blu-ray were released in the United Kingdom on November 3, 2008, and the DVD was released in Australia on October 8.

Also included on the 2-disc release were two bonus performances not included in either version of the film: Miley Cyrus performing "Good and Broken" and the Jonas Brothers performing "S.O.S". A performance of "Good and Broken" had previously appeared on the film's soundtrack album.

=== Television ===
Hannah Montana and Miley Cyrus: Best of Both Worlds Concert premiered on Disney Channel on July 26, 2008. It is not counted as a Disney Channel Original Movie due to being shot live and receiving a theatrical release.

It premiered in Disney Channel Latin America on July 3, 2010 as the ¡Canta Montana! (Sing, Montana!) programming, and brought over 19.9 million viewers. It premiered in Estonia on TV3 on January 29, 2011 as the Hanna Montana ja Miley Cyrus: Parimad lood (Hannah Montana & Miley Cyrus: Best of Both Worlds), which rated 15.3 million viewers as part of the third season's premiere.

The latter was released on Disney Channel Asia with an average of 22.4 million viewers. The initial viewing was in 3D, with the 2D version the following day.

== Reception ==
On review aggregator Rotten Tomatoes, the film holds an approval rating of 70% and an average rating of 6.00/10, based on 44 reviews. The website's critics consensus reads: "This high-energy concert film should please Cyrus' rabid pre-teen fan base -- and may come as a pleasant surprise for parents." On Metacritic, the film has a weighted average score of 59 out of 100 based on 13 critics, indicating "mixed or average reviews".

== See also ==
- Hannah Montana: The Movie
