= Make Some Noise (Hannah Montana song) =

Single by Hannah Montana

from the album Hannah Montana 2
- Released: June 5, 2007
- Studio: Red Decibel Studios (Mission Viejo, CA)
- Genre: Pop rock
- Length: 4:44
- Label: Walt Disney
- Songwriters: Andy Dodd; Adam Watts
- Producers: Andy Dodd; Adam Watts

Miley Cyrus singles chronology
"Nobody's Perfect" (2007)	"Make Some Noise" (2007)	"Ready, Set, Don't Go" (2007)

"Make Some Noise" is a song by fictional character Hannah Montana, recorded by American singer and actress Miley Cyrus for the soundtrack album Hannah Montana 2 (2007), which accompanied the second season of the Disney Channel series Hannah Montana. It was released on June 5, 2007, as the second and final single from the soundtrack album.

== Background and composition ==
Written and produced by Andy Dodd and Adam Watts, "Make Some Noise" has a length of four minutes and forty-four seconds. Lyrically, the song urges teens to stand up and "make some noise" for what they believe in.

== Critical reception ==
Heather Phares, writing for AllMusic, described the song as a "less-inspired [version] of the shiny, synth-driven pop and strummy acoustic ballads that made the first Hannah Montana soundtrack a hit."

== Chart performance ==
The song debuted at number 73 on Hot Digital Songs which led to it making into the Billboard Hot 100, for the week ending July 14, 2007. The song debuted and peaked at number 92 in the Hot 100. On the same week, the song debuted and peaked at number 78 on the now defunct Pop 100.

== Live performances ==
Cyrus, dressed as Montana, premiered "Make Some Noise", along with eight other songs, at the concert taping for the second season of Hannah Montana. The live video has been used as a music video on the Disney Channel and was released onto iTunes in 2007.

== Charts ==
Chart (2007)	Peak position
US Billboard Hot 100	92
US Billboard Pop 100	78
