= Start All Over =

2008 single by Miley Cyrus

Single by Miley Cyrus

from the album Meet Miley Cyrus
- Released: February 18, 2008 (Australia only)
- Genre: Rock
- Length: 3:27
- Label: Hollywood
- Songwriters: Fefe Dobson; Anne Preven; Scott Cutler
- Producer: Annetenna

Miley Cyrus singles chronology
"See You Again" (2007)	"Start All Over" (2008)	"7 Things" (2008)

Music video
- "Start All Over" on YouTube

"Start All Over" is a song recorded by American singer Miley Cyrus for her debut studio album Meet Miley Cyrus (2007). It was released as the second and final single from the album on February 18, 2008, in Australia. The song was written by Fefe Dobson, Anne Preven and produced by Annetenna. It was released by Hollywood Records on March 11, 2008, as the second single from the album only in Australia. An accompanying music video, directed by Marc Webb was also released.

== Background and composition ==
"Start All Over" (2007)
A 21 second sample of Miley Cyrus' "Start All Over".

A live version is available on Hannah Montana and Miley Cyrus: Best of Both Worlds Concert and as an instrumental in Cyrus's karaoke series.

The song was written and recorded by Canadian recording artist Fefe Dobson for her unreleased second album Sunday Love. Dobson explained on an August 2009 interview with MTV News,

"I wrote a song, she dug it, and she sang it. But I didn't want it for my record. It just wasn't right for me, and I just felt like it was better for someone else, and she does a great job on it. I was really impressed. She sounded great. I'm actually happier she did it than I did it."

Dobson sings background vocals, along with Anne Preven, on Cyrus' version of the song. Among other personnel are: Paul Bushnell for bass guitar, Scott Cutler and David Levita for electric guitar, Josh Freese for drums and Jeff Turzo for keyboard. It is set in common time with a moderately fast tempo of 150 beats per minute. The song is written in a key of G major, with a Mixolydian melody in the verses. Cyrus' vocals spans one octave, from G_{3} to B_{4}. The song has the following chord progression, Dm7–Am–G5. In an interview with Access Hollywood on the set of the music video, Cyrus mentioned that the song was involved with romance and "the guy that I'm supposed to 'start all over'". Lael Loewenstein, writing for Variety, stated that "Breakout" and "Start All Over" "touch on the theme of self-reinvention".

== Chart performance ==
"Start All Over"'s debut appearance on Hot Digital Songs led to charting in the Billboard Hot 100. For the week ending January 18, 2008, "Start All Over" debuted and peaked in the Hot 100 at number 68. That same week, the song debuted and peaked at number 57 on the discontinued Pop 100. For the week ending January 26, the song ascended to number 50 on Hot Digital Songs, but failed to ascend in the Hot 100 and Pop 100; that week was its last on the three charts. The song garnered similar commercial outcomes in other nations. For the week ending February 23, 2008, in the Canadian Hot 100, the song charted at number 93, falling from the chart the week after. In the Australian Singles Chart, issue dated July 14, "Start All Over" debuted at number 50. In its second week, ending August 11, 2009, the song moved up to number 41, where it peaked, and fell from the top 50 after five weeks.

The song reached its highest international peak in Australia at number 41 and also charted in Canada and the United States at numbers 91 and 68 respectively. The song was also certified gold by the Recording Industry Association of America (RIAA) for shipping over 500,000 copies. Cyrus performed the song in 2007 and 2008 the Best of Both Worlds Tour, as the opening number for her performances as herself. Cyrus again performed "Start All Over" once she embarked on the 2009 Wonder World Tour.

== Music video ==
On an exclusive interview with Access Hollywood, Cyrus spoke in regards to the music video for the song, directed by Marc Webb. She said, "I wanted something crazy that no one else has done and like really random because this song is kinda random." Shot on November 16, 2007, in a suburban area of Los Angeles, California, the video included fifty background dancers, such as a middle school teacher. Cyrus said the concept was, "I'm singing and dancing and like rocking out and I have no idea where these people come from." The portion of the music video in which she enters the "carnival-like" scene drew influences from the 1950s and Hairspray. Another concept she further explained was the appearance of a man in a "prom-setting." Cyrus said, "Here it's gonna be the guy that I'm supposed to 'start all over' and we're at prom, so I'm just [...] not like in a dress or anything. So, it's random. It's like everything is happening all at once." The ending of the music video, she explained, was when she went back to "where [she] belongs" after a day of "torture."

The video commences with Cyrus, in pajamas, turning off a nightlight and falling asleep. When she wakes up, Cyrus finds herself on her bed, in a skate ramp; she is wearing a white T-shirt, a black vest, red pants and black boots. Meanwhile, skaters are using the ramp, Cyrus stands and performs the song in a confused manner. She then enters a school bus, occupied by businessmen and businesswomen, which she exits through the back emergency door. Throughout the rest of the video Cyrus is seen exploring a "carnival-like" setting, while dancing. Several random figures make appearances, such as astronauts, scuba divers, middle school teachers, and cowboys. A large star pattern falls and reveals a concert stage where Cyrus performs the song along with a band. In the conclusion of the video, Cyrus is woken up by an alarm clock and a printer prints stills from what occurred throughout the music video. The music video to "Start All Over" was first seen on the Disney Channel on December 19, 2007. It became digitally available, via iTunes Store, on January 29, 2008. In 2008, the video received a MuchMusic Video nomination for Best International Artist Video, but lost to Rihanna's video for "Don't Stop the Music."

== Live performances ==
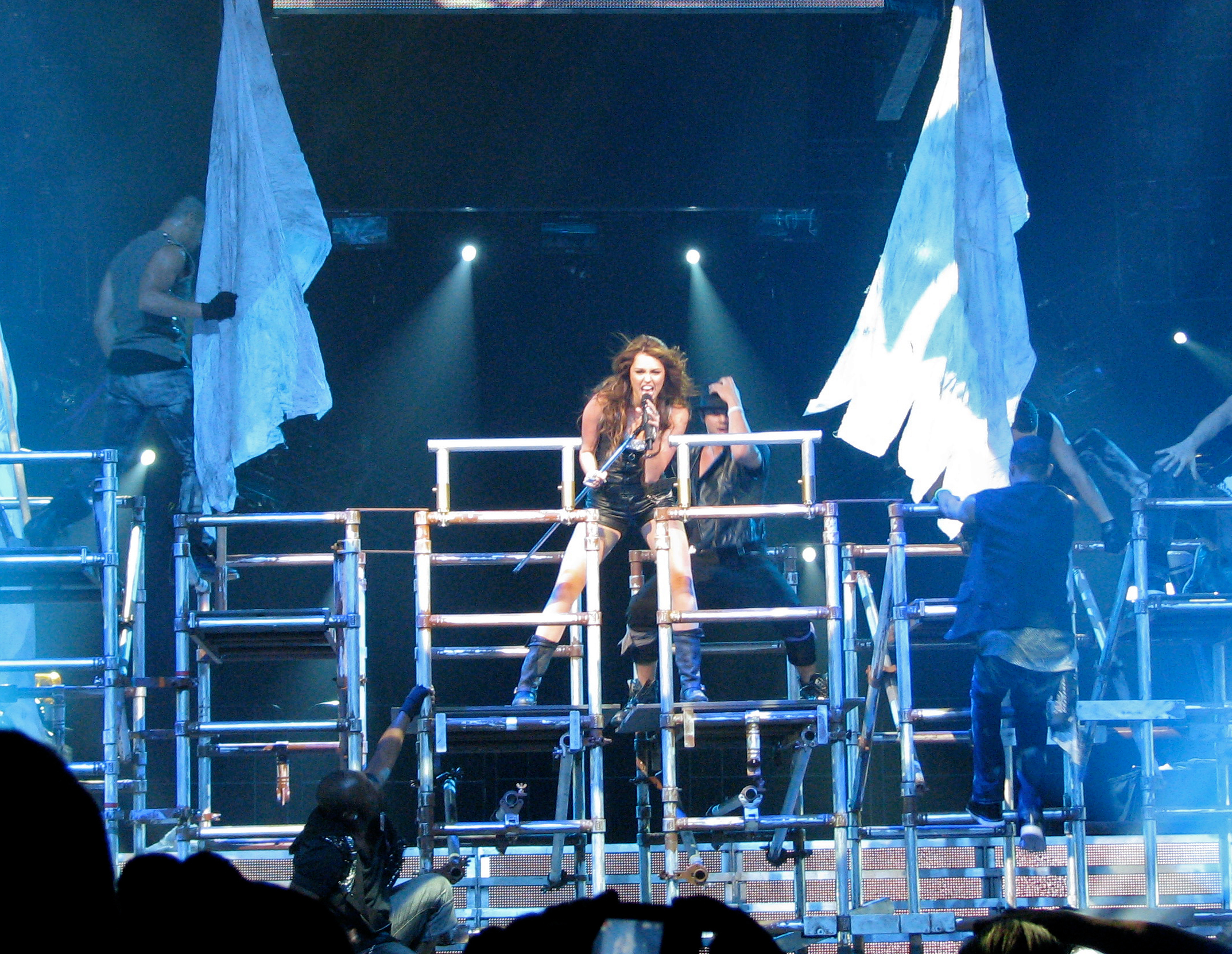
Cyrus performing "Start All Over" at the Wonder World Tour

On December 31, 2007, Cyrus performed the song along with "G.N.O. (Girl's Night Out)" and "We Got the Party," a duet with the Jonas Brothers, on the 2008 episode special of Dick Clark's New Year's Rockin' Eve with Ryan Seacrest. "Start All Over" was then most notably performed on Cyrus' first headlining tour, the Best of Both Worlds Tour. On the tour, the song served as the opening number for the portion of songs that Cyrus performed as herself. The song was preceded by the interlude from the opening act: first leg by the Jonas Brothers, ("Year 3000") second leg by Aly & AJ ("Rush") and third leg by Everlife. During the performances, Cyrus wore a gray metallic jacket, a white T-shirt and black leggings. It began with Cyrus emerging from the bottom of the stage and then roaming around the stage to perform the song. Cyrus' performance of "Start All Over" during the tour was received from mixed to average reviews by critics. Maitland McDonagh of TV Guide magazine stated that Cyrus' return after the Brothers was an up-beat "vague rocker-chick grab." A promotional music video from these live performances were made to promote the Hannah Montana and Miley Cyrus: Best of Both Worlds Concert film.

On June 7, 2009, at the twentieth annual A Time for Heroes Celebrity Carnival, Cyrus performed the song, coupled with "7 Things," "Breakout," "The Climb," "The Driveway," "Fly on the Wall," "These Four Walls" and "See You Again." Proceeded by "Breakout," it is second on the set list of her current and first international concert tour, the Wonder World Tour. In these performances, Cyrus wears black boots, skimpy black shorts and tank top. Throughout most of "Start All Over," Cyrus maintains on the construction carts that were used on the end of opening number.

== Release history ==
Release dates and formats
Region	Date	Format
Australia	March 11, 2008	CD single

== Charts ==
Weekly chart performance
Chart (2008)	Peak position
Australia (ARIA)	41
Canada Hot 100 (Billboard)	91
US Billboard Hot 100	68

== Certification ==
Region	Certification	Certified units/sales
United States (RIAA)	Gold	500,000^{‡}
^{‡} Sales+streaming figures based on certification alone.
