= Hannah Montana 2: Meet Miley Cyrus =

2007 studio album by Miley Cyrus

- Front cover art (Note: The front cover is the primary artwork for the Hannah Montana 2 disc.)

Soundtrack album / studio album by Hannah Montana and Miley Cyrus
- Released: June 26, 2007
- Recorded: 2006–2007
- Studios: Red Decibel Studios (Mission Viejo, California); I.D.E.A.S. Studios (Miami); Gad Studios (Ibiza); Strawberrybee Studios (New York City); Bliss Recordings (Hollywood); Castlebury Productions (Nashville); The Sound Kitchen (Franklin, Tennessee)
- Genre: Pop rock
- Length: 34:57 (Disc 1); 33:01 (Disc 2)
- Labels: Walt Disney; Hollywood
- Producers: Antonina Armato; Tim James; Matthew Gerrard; Toby Gad; Kara DioGuardi; Andy Dodd; Adam Watts; Michael Bradford; Jamie Houston; Marco Marinangeli; Matthew Wilder; Xandy Barry; Wally Gagel; Annetenna; Brian Green

Miley Cyrus chronology
Hannah Montana (2006)	Hannah Montana 2: Meet Miley Cyrus (2007)	Hannah Montana 2: Non-Stop Dance Party (2008)

Singles from Hannah Montana 2
- 1. "Nobody's Perfect" Released: May 15, 2007; 2. "Make Some Noise" Released: June 5, 2007

Alternate cover
- Rear cover art (Note: The rear cover is the primary artwork for the Meet Miley Cyrus disc.)

Singles from Meet Miley Cyrus
- 1. "See You Again" Released: 2007; 2. "Start All Over" Released: March 11, 2008

Hannah Montana 2: Meet Miley Cyrus is a double album by the American singer Miley Cyrus, released on June 26, 2007. The first disc, Hannah Montana 2, is the soundtrack for the second season of the television series Hannah Montana and is credited to Cyrus's title character Hannah Montana, released by Walt Disney Records. The second disc, Meet Miley Cyrus, from Hollywood Records, is the first album release under Cyrus's own name.

Hannah Montana 2: Meet Miley Cyrus debuted at number 1 on the US Billboard 200, with first-week sales of 326,000 copies, and has since become certified quadruple-Platinum by the Recording Industry Association of America (RIAA) for exceeding shipments of four million units. Cyrus was also the seventh solo artist under the age of eighteen to chart at number 1 on the Billboard 200. The album performed well on national record charts throughout Europe and Oceania, appearing in the top twenty in several countries. The album received a multi-Platinum certification by Music Canada, Platinum certifications by the Australian Recording Industry Association (ARIA) in Australia and the International Federation of the Phonographic Industry (IFPI) in Sweden, and Gold certifications by the Mexican Association of Phonograph Producers (AMPROFON) in Mexico and the British Phonographic Industry (BPI) in the United Kingdom.

"Nobody's Perfect" was released as the lead single from Hannah Montana 2 on May 15, 2007, peaking at number 27 in the US, making it the highest charting Hannah Montana single at the time. "Make Some Noise" was released on June 5, 2007, as a digital download. "See You Again" was released as the lead single from Meet Miley Cyrus. It peaked at number 10 on the Billboard Hot 100, becoming Cyrus's first single to enter the Top 10. "Start All Over" was released only in Australia on March 11, 2008, and peaked at number 68. The album was promoted during Cyrus's first headlining concert tour, the Best of Both Worlds Tour (2007–08).

== Background and composition ==
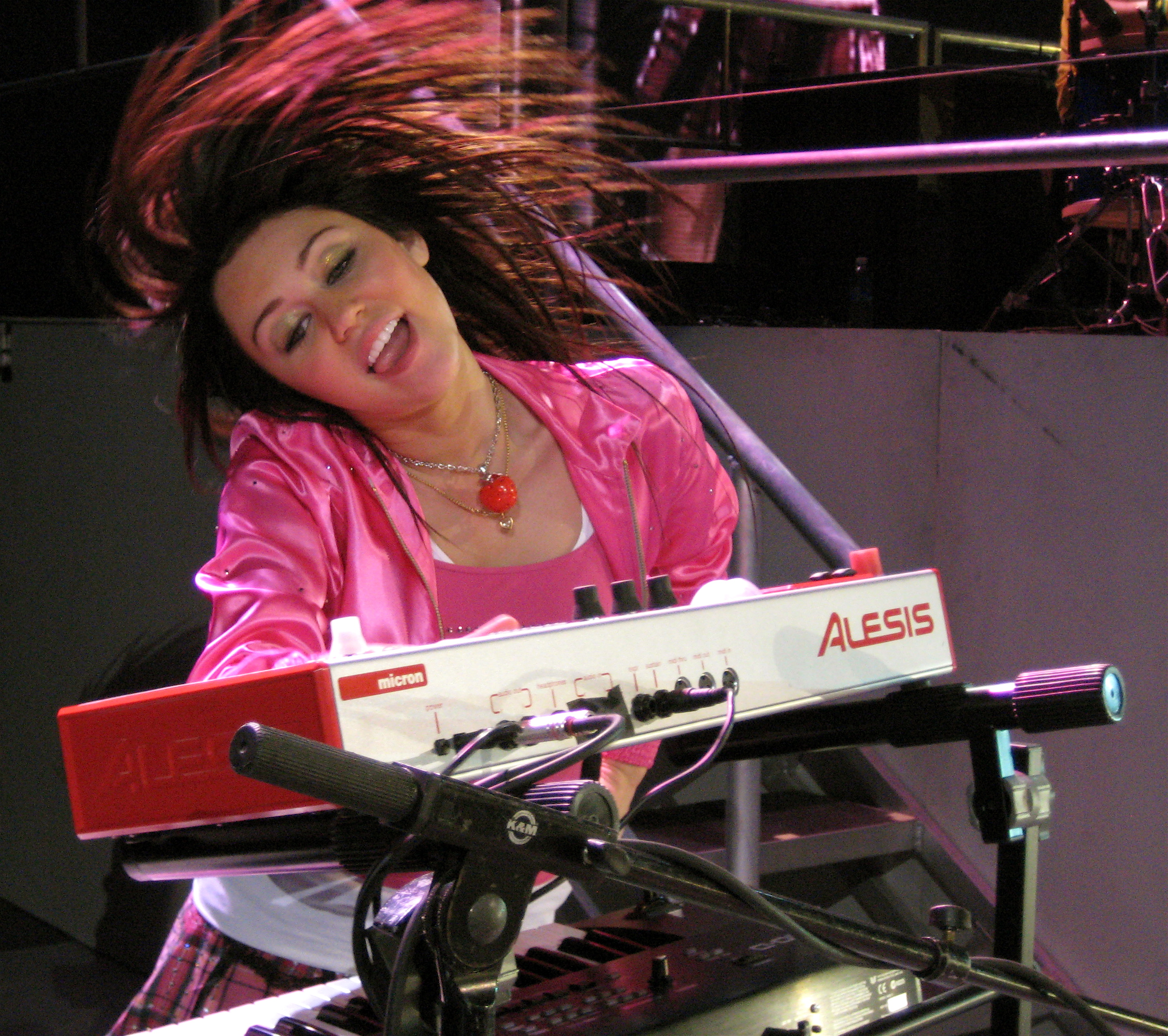
Miley Cyrus portrayed the title character on the television series Hannah Montana.

During the production of the first season of Hannah Montana, Cyrus commented that "right now we're just all really focused on making Hannah Montana the show as good as it can be, but hopefully in the future there may be a Hannah Montana soundtrack [or] a Miley Cyrus album." The series itself premiered through the Disney Channel on March 24, 2006, and became an immediate commercial success; with 5.4 million viewers, the pilot episode earned the channel the highest ratings in its history at the time. The following month, it was reported that an accompanying soundtrack and Cyrus's debut album had both begun production, the latter of which was scheduled to be released in early 2007. The first soundtrack Hannah Montana (2006) launched at number 1 with first-week sales of 286,000 copies, becoming the first television soundtrack to debut in the peak position of the chart.

In the series, Cyrus portrays the character Miley Stewart, a teenager who lives the secret double life as the pop star Hannah Montana. Cyrus said that "most songs for the first season reflect the show, with Miley or Hannah making sure the other doesn't get caught or whatever," opining that the tracks provided series producers with the opportunity to "make sure that everyone understood the characters". By comparison, Cyrus described material used during the second season as "more speaking out to the fans." Heather Phares from AllMusic described Cyrus's vocals on her personal tracks as being "lower and throatier" with "more organic and rock-oriented" instrumentation.

Kathi Kamen Goldmark from Common Sense Media noted the inclusion of "positive, self-empowering messages for tween girls" throughout the album. Hannah Montana 2 continued to discuss Cyrus's double life on the program, notably in the tracks "Rock Star" and "Old Blue Jeans". Friendships are addressed during "Right Here", "You and Me Together", and "True Friend". The songs "Nobody's Perfect", "Make Some Noise", and "Life's What You Make It" discuss maintaining an optimistic outlook in life. Meet Miley Cyrus explored "more serious objects" including teen romances. Its closing track "I Miss You" is a dedication to Cyrus's late grandfather. Hannah Montana 2 was later reissued as a two-disc special edition only in Japan. It included a remix of the track "We Got the Party" with the Jonas Brothers, an acoustic version of "One in a Million", and a DVD of live performances. Meet Miley Cyrus was omitted. Meet Miley Cyrus remained unreleased as a standalone album until January 2021, when both albums were reissued separately for the first time on digital platforms.

== Singles ==
=== From Hannah Montana 2 ===
"Nobody's Perfect" was originally released on March 20, 2007, accompanying the reissue of the original Hannah Montana soundtrack. The track was later serviced as the lead single from Hannah Montana 2, and was individually released on May 15. The song peaked at number 27 on the US Billboard Hot 100. Despite not releasing official follow-up singles, several tracks from the soundtrack charted in the United States. "Life's What You Make It" was the highest-peaking track from the record, having entered the chart at number 25. "Rock Star", "Make Some Noise", and "True Friend" charted in the lower ends of the Billboard Hot 100, having respectively reached numbers 81, 92, and 99.

=== From Meet Miley Cyrus ===
"See You Again" became Cyrus's first song to peak in the Top 10 in the United States when it hit number 10 on the Billboard Hot 100. Its "Rock Mafia Remix" was included on Cyrus's second album Breakout (2008), and was released on August 11, 2008, as an individual single. "Start All Over" was released only in Australia as the second single on March 11, 2008. The song peaked at number 68 in the United States. Its accompanying music video was premiered on December 14, 2007.

== Promotion ==
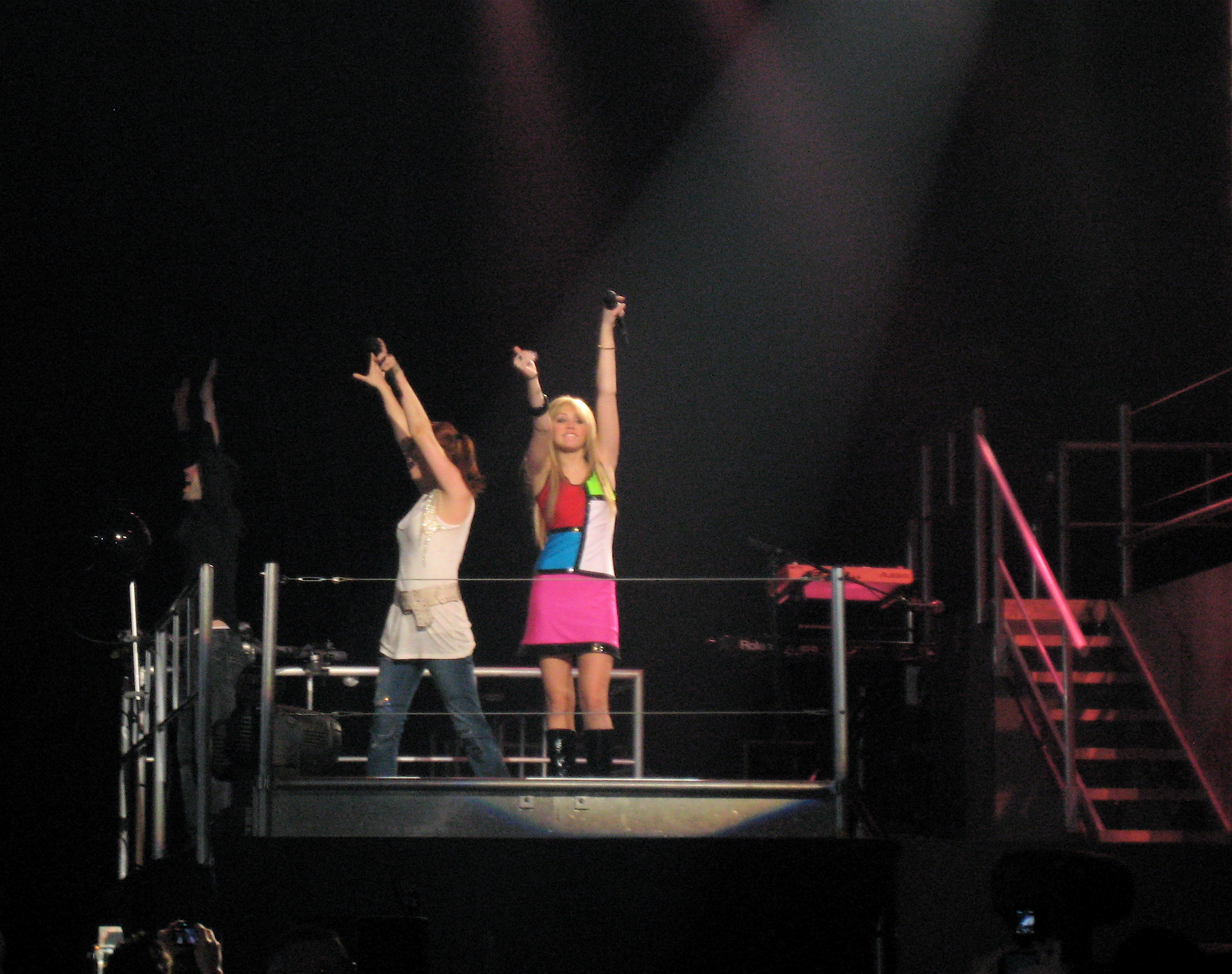
Cyrus performing "Pumpin' Up the Party" on the Best of Both Worlds Tour.

As Hannah Montana, Cyrus performed songs from Hannah Montana 2 live for the first time at the Hannah Montana: Live in London concert held at the Koko Club on March 28, 2007, in London, England. She also promoted the soundtrack performing live as the character at opening ceremony of the 2007 Disney Channel Games and at the 2007 Good Morning America Summer Concert Series.

On the following day of its release, a free concert held at the courtyard of the Hollywood and Highland Center in Los Angeles, California was used to promote the soundtrack alongside Cyrus's debut studio album, where she performed songs from both albums as Hannah Montana and as herself.

As herself, Cyrus first performed songs from Meet Miley Cyrus, "See You Again" and "G.N.O. (Girls Night Out)", at the closing ceremony of the 2007 Disney Channel Games held on April 27, 2007, which was also the first time she performed as herself and not as Hannah Montana. On December 20, 2007, Cyrus performed "I Miss You" on The Oprah Winfrey Show. On New Year's Eve, she performed "Start All Over", "See You Again" and "We Got The Party" with the Jonas Brothers at the Dick Clark's New Year's Rockin' Eve in New York City. In 2008 Cyrus performed "G.N.O. (Girls Night Out)" at the 2007 Nickelodeon Kids Choice Awards on March 29 and "See You Again" with "Good and Broken" at Idol Gives Back on April 14. She also performed "G.N.O. (Girls Night Out)" with Dr. Teeth and the Electric Mayhem at the Disney Channel featuring The Muppets' special Studio DC: Almost Live.

=== Tour ===
Cyrus embarked on the Best of Both Worlds Tour in 2007 and 2008 in the U.S. and Canada. It primarily served as a promotional tool for Hannah Montana 2: Meet Miley Cyrus; however, "Just Like You", "Pumpin' Up the Party", "I Got Nerve", and "The Best of Both Worlds" from the original Hannah Montana soundtrack were also included in its set list. The tour proved commercially successful, having grossed $54 million by its conclusion, while its 2008 film adaption Hannah Montana and Miley Cyrus: Best of Both Worlds Concert earned $70 million. The latter was released as a Walmart-exclusive CD/DVD set, titled Best of Both Worlds Concert, in March 2008.

=== Karaoke Series ===
A karaoke album titled Disney's Karaoke Series: Hannah Montana 2 was released by Walt Disney Records on June 12, 2008. It is composed of eight tracks from Hannah Montana 2, which are credited to Hannah Montana. Each track is included in both instrumental and vocal versions. It charted at number 14 on the Billboard US Kid Albums Charts.

The Meet Miley Cyrus version of the karaoke album titled Artist Karaoke Series: Miley Cyrus was released by Walt Disney Records on May 20, 2008. It is composed of eight instrumental tracks from Meet Miley Cyrus, which are credited to Miley Cyrus. It omitted two other songs from the original album, "Clear" and "Good and Broken". It charted at number 14 on the Billboard US Kid Albums Charts.

== Critical reception ==
Professional ratings
Review scores
Source	Rating
AllMusic	3/5 stars
Common Sense Media	3.5/5 stars
Entertainment Weekly	A−
MSN Music (Consumer Guide)	(choice cut)
PluggedIn	(favorable)

Writing for AllMusic, Heather Phares expressed concern that Cyrus was "in danger of being overshadowed by the role she plays", but complimented that incorporation of "shiny, synth-driven pop and strummy acoustic ballads", praising the album. She also noted Cyrus's "East Northumberland High" as the standout track from both discs. Kathi Kamen Goldmark from Common Sense Media opined that releasing Hannah Montana 2 and Meet Miley Cyrus as a single project was a value for the younger audience it attracted. However, she criticized its production for being "synthesized and over-processed", and added that the records would "irritate anyone with more mature musical taste." However, Bob Smithouser and Bob Waliszewski from PluggedIn provided a more favorable review, stating that the album was "a great pick for [Cyrus'] tween fan base" and compared its musical style to that of Ashlee Simpson. Shirley Halperin from Entertainment Weekly shared a similar sentiment, further comparing its sound to those of Hilary Duff and Avril Lavigne. She opined that the first disc "delivers pure pop candy and impresses with R&B-tinged ballads", while the second disc was notable for its "risk-taking" lyrics.

== Commercial performance ==
In the United States, Hannah Montana 2: Meet Miley Cyrus competed with Kelly Clarkson's My December for first place. On July 14, Hannah Montana 2: Meet Miley Cyrus debuted at number 1 with first-week sales of 326,000 copies; 35,000 units ahead of My December, which charted in second place. In doing so, it surpassed the first-week sales of the original Hannah Montana soundtrack, which opened with 281,000 units the previous year. Five songs from the record appeared on the Billboard Hot 100, four of those being debuts on which three were credited to the fictional Hannah Montana and one to Miley Cyrus. The highest new entry was "Life's What You Make It" at number 25. In March 2008, the record reached number 6 the same week that Best of Both Worlds Concert reached number 10 in its second week of availability. In doing so, Cyrus became the first person with two records in the Top 10 of the Billboard 200 since Ray Charles accomplished this in 2004. On February 8, 2008, the record was certified triple-Platinum by the RIAA for exceeding shipments of three million copies.

The album became the 71st best performing Billboard 200 album up to that time after spending a total of sixty-five weeks on the chart, of which twenty-three were in the Top 10. The album ranked at numbers 16 and 11 on the Billboard 200 Year-End Chart of 2007 and 2008, respectively, and also number 112 on the Billboard 200 Decade-End Chart (2000s).

Hannah Montana 2: Meet Miley Cyrus opened at number 3 on the Canadian Albums Chart, and was recognized with a Platinum certification in the country. It also charted at number 18 on the Top 100 Mexico, where it was later certified Gold. The record performed well throughout Europe. Its highest peak in the continent was on the Norwegian VG-lista, where it reached number 8. It also reached the top half of the Ö3 Austria Top 40, the Danish Tracklisten, the Portuguese Albums Chart, and the Swedish Sverigetopplistan. It charted lower on the German Media Control Charts, the Swiss Hitparade, and the French SNEP, where it reached numbers 47, 69, and 178, respectively. The record peaked at number 46 on the Spanish PROMUSICAE, and was also certified Gold in the United Kingdom by the British Phonographic Industry. The album reached number 50 on the Swedish Sverigetopplistan. In Oceania, Hannah Montana 2: Meet Miley Cyrus respectively charted at numbers 20 and 6 on the Australian ARIA Charts and the Official New Zealand Music Chart. In the former country, it was certified Platinum.

== Track listing ==
=== Hannah Montana 2 ===
Disc one
No.	Title	Writer(s)	Producer(s)	Length
1.	"We Got the Party"	Greg Wells; Kara DioGuardi	Wells; DioGuardi	3:36
2.	"Nobody's Perfect"	Matthew Gerrard; Robbie Nevil	Gerrard	3:20
3.	"Make Some Noise"	Andy Dodd; Adam Watts	Dodd; Watts	4:46
4.	"Rock Star"	Aristedis Archontis; Jeannie Lurie; Chen Neeman	Toby Gad	2:58
5.	"Old Blue Jeans"	Michael Bradford; Pam Sheyne	Bradford	3:22
6.	"Life's What You Make It"	Gerrard; Nevil	Gerrard	3:10
7.	"One in a Million"	Gad; Negin Djafari	Gad	3:55
8.	"Bigger than Us"	Antonina Armato; Tim James	Armato; James; Dorian Crozier^{[a]}	2:56
9.	"You and Me Together"	Jamie Houston	Houston	3:47
10.	"True Friend"	Lurie	Marco Marinangeli	3:10
Total length:				35:05

=== Meet Miley Cyrus ===
Disc two
No.	Title	Writer(s)	Producer(s)	Length
1.	"See You Again"	Destiny Hope Cyrus; Armato; James	Armato; James	3:10
2.	"East Northumberland High"	Armato; James; Samantha Jo Moore	Armato; James	3:24
3.	"Let's Dance"	Cyrus; Armato; James	Armato; James	3:03
4.	"G.N.O. (Girl's Night Out)"	Cyrus; Matthew Wilder; Tamara Dunn	Wilder	3:38
5.	"Right Here"	Cyrus; Armato; James	Armato; James	2:45
6.	"As I Am"	Cyrus; Shelley Peiken; Xandy Barry	Barry; Wally Gagel	3:46
7.	"Start All Over"	Scott Cutler; Anne Preven; Fefe Dobson	Annetenna	3:27
8.	"Clear"	Cyrus; Peiken; Barry	Armato; James	3:03
9.	"Good and Broken"	Cyrus; Armato; James	Armato; James	2:56
10.	"I Miss You"	Cyrus; Brian Green; Wendi Foy Green	B. Green	3:58
Total length:				33:05

Notes

- ^{^a} signifies a co-producer
- The Rock Star edition includes the bonus tracks "One in a Million" (Acoustic Version), and "We Got the Party" with the Jonas Brothers on disc 1.
- The Meet Miley Cyrus section is not included on the Rock Star edition CD release. Instead it features a DVD as disc 2 which includes the live performance of "Life's What You Make It", "Old Blue Jeans", "One in a Million", "Make Some Noise", "True Friend", "Nobody's Perfect", "Bigger than Us", and "One in a Million" (Acoustic Version).
- A different version of the track list was originally announced with outtakes "He Needs Me" and "Goodbye" appearing instead of "As I Am" and "Good and Broken" on the Meet Miley Cyrus disc, The track listing order and track names for both discs were also significantly changed.
- A "special book club edition" of the album was released and sold at scholastic book fairs in April 2008, that included all the tracks from the first disk besides "Bigger than Us" and "You and Me Together".
- The overseas special digital edition of Hannah Montana 2 includes the bonus remix track "The Best of Both Worlds" (Daniel Canary Remix).

== Credits and personnel ==
Credits adapted from AllMusic.

- Xandy Barry – mixing, guitars, keyboards, and background vocals (2:6)
- Steven Beers – assistant engineer (2:10)
- Doug Boehm – engineering (2:7)
- Ronnie Brookshire – engineering and mixing (2:10)
- Paul Bushnell – bass guitar (2:4, 2:7)
- Dave Cleveland – electric and acoustic guitars (2:10)
- Greg Collins – engineering (2:7)
- Greg Critchley – drums (1:2, 1:6)
- Dorian Crozier – engineering, drums, and drum programming (2:1–2:3, 2:5, 2:8, 2:9)
- Scott Cutler – guitars (2:7)
- Miley Cyrus – background vocals (2:6)
- Dave Dillbeck (2:10)
- Kara DioGuardi – background vocals (1:1)
- Fefe Dobson – background vocals (2:7)
- Andy Dodd – mixing, guitars, keyboards, and programming (1:3)
- Josh Freese – drums (2:7)
- Jens Gad – guitar solo (1:4)
- Toby Gad – engineering and mixing (1:7), guitars, bass guitar, keyboards, and programming (1:4, 1:7)
- Steve Gerdes – creative direction (1:1–1:10)
- Matthew Gerrard – arrangement, mixing, guitar, bass guitar, keyboards, and programming (1:2, 1:6)
- Brian Green – arrangement, piano, and programming (2:10)
- Wendy Foy Green – background vocals (2:10)
- John Hammond – drums (2:10)
- Steve Hammons – engineering (2:1–2:3, 2:5, 2:8, 2:9)
- James Harrah – guitars (2:4)
- Jamie Houston – mixing, engineering, drum programming, and background vocals (1:9)
- Sean Hurley – bass guitar (2:1–2:3, 2:5, 2:8, 2:9)
- Tim James – mixing (1:8, 2:1–2:3, 2:5, 2:8, 2:9)
- Buck Johnson – keyboards (1:9)
- Stacy Jones – drums (2:6)
- Abe Laboriel, Jr. – drums (2:4)
- David Levita – guitars (2:7)
- Jon Lind – A&R (2:1–2:10)
- Marco Luciani – drums (1:2, 1:6)
- Nigel Lundemo – engineering (2:1–2:3, 2:5, 2:8, 2:9)
- Gary Lunn – bass guitar (2:10)
- Marco Marinangeli – arrangement and mixing (1:10)
- Dani Markman – A&R (1:1–1:10)
- Jason Morey – executive producer (2:1–2:10)
- Jamie Muhoberac – keyboards (2:1–2:3, 2:5, 2:8, 2:9)
- Clif Norrell – mixing (2:7)
- Paul Palmer – mixing (1:8, 2:1–2:3, 2:5, 2:8, 2:9)
- Geoff Pearlman – guitar (1:9)
- Shelly Peiken – background vocals (2:6)
- Csaba Petocz – engineering (2:4)
- Tim Pierce – guitars (2:1–2:3, 2:5, 2:8, 2:9)
- Anne Preven – background vocals (2:7)
- Nic Rodriguez – bass guitar (1:3)
- Ashley Saunig – background vocals (1:2, 1:6, 1:9)
- Eddy Schreyer – mastering (1:1–1:10)
- Jeff Turzo – keyboards (2:7)
- Steve Vincent – executive in charge of music (1:1–1:10)
- Robert Vosgien – mastering (2:1–2:10)
- Windy Wagner – background vocals (1:3)
- Adam Watts – mixing, drums, and programming (1:3)
- Greg Wells – mixing and all instruments (1:1)
- Matthew Wilder – mixing, engineering, guitars, keyboards, and programming (2:4)

== Charts ==
=== Weekly charts ===
Chart (2007–09)	Peak position
Australian Albums (ARIA)	20
Austrian Albums (Ö3 Austria)	13
Canadian Albums (Billboard)	3
Danish Albums (Hitlisten)	23
French Albums (SNEP)	178
German Albums (Offizielle Top 100)	35
Hungarian Albums (MAHASZ)	18
Mexican Albums (Top 100 Mexico)	18
New Zealand Albums (RMNZ)	6
Norwegian Albums (VG-lista)	8
Polish Album Chart	12
Portuguese Albums (AFP)	12
Spanish Albums (Promusicae)	46
Swedish Albums (Sverigetopplistan)	50
Swiss Albums (Schweizer Hitparade)	69
UK Compilation Albums (Official Charts)	8
US Billboard 200	1
US Soundtrack Albums (Billboard)	1

=== Year-end charts ===
Chart (2007)	Position
Australian Albums (ARIA)	77
US Billboard 200	16
US Soundtrack Albums (Billboard)	3
Worldwide Albums (IFPI)	11

Chart (2008)	Position
Australian Albums (ARIA)	87
Canadian Albums (Billboard)	14
New Zealand Albums (RMNZ)	39
US Billboard 200	11
US Soundtrack Albums (Billboard)	1

=== Decade-end charts ===
Chart (2000–09)	Position
US Billboard 200	112

=== All-time charts ===
Chart (All-time)	Position
US Billboard 200	71
US Billboard 200 (Women)	23

== Certifications ==
Region	Certification	Certified units/sales
Australia (ARIA)	Platinum	70,000^{^}
Brazil (Pro-Música Brasil)	Gold	30,000^{*}
Canada (Music Canada)	2× Platinum	200,000^{^}
Mexico (AMPROFON)	Gold	50,000^{^}
New Zealand (RMNZ)	Platinum	15,000^{‡}
United Kingdom (BPI)	Gold	100,000^{^}
United States (RIAA)	4× Platinum	4,000,000^{‡}
^{*} Sales figures based on certification alone.^{^} Shipments figures based on certification alone.^{‡} Sales+streaming figures based on certification alone.

== Release history ==
Hannah Montana 2: Meet Miley Cyrus release history
Region	Date	Format	Album	Label	Ref.
Various	June 26, 2007	CD; digital download	Hannah Montana 2; Meet Miley Cyrus	Walt Disney; Hollywood	
Various	January 22, 2021	Digital download; streaming	Hannah Montana 2	Walt Disney	
Various	January 22, 2021	Digital download; streaming	Meet Miley Cyrus	Hollywood	
United States	September 4, 2024	Vinyl	Meet Miley Cyrus	Hollywood	
United States	March 4, 2026	Vinyl	Hannah Montana 2	Walt Disney	

== See also ==
- List of Billboard 200 number-one albums of 2007
