= Hilary Liftin =

American author (born 1969)

- Born: 1969 (age 56–57); New York City
- Education: Yale University
- Occupation: Author
- Website: www.hilaryliftin.com

Hilary Liftin is an American author, born in New York City in 1969.

== Career ==
Liftin is most notable for her ghost-writing and co-writing of celebrity memoirs and novels, including Tori Spelling's memoirs Stori Telling, Mommywood and Uncharted Territori and her children's book, Presenting... Tallulah. She has also worked on Miley Cyrus' memoir Miles To Go, and Teri Hatcher's Burnt Toast: And Other Philosophies Of Life.

Liftin worked in the book publishing industry for ten years before becoming a ghost/co-writer. Her first work, published on April 27, 1999, by Vintage Books, was co-written with her close friend and former college-roommate Kate Montgomery. Titled Dear Exile: The True Story of Two Friends Separated (for a Year) by an Ocean, the book is a collection of letters they wrote to one another over a year-long period, while Montgomery was on assignment in rural Kenya with the Peace Corps, and Hilary, in Manhattan, New York, first pursuing her career. Her second book, Candy and Me: A Love Story (2003, Free Press) is a memoir about her lifelong obsession with candy and other sweet things.

Liftin's most recent work, Movie Star by Lizzie Pepper (2015, Viking), is the story of a young television actress who gets seduced by a Hollywood megastar and sucked into his religious cult. After a few years into their heavily chronicled marriage, she runs for her life, right onto Broadway. In a New York Times interview, Liftin said she "wrote the celebrity memoir of my fantasies."

== Personal life ==
Liftin graduated from Yale University with an English degree. She is married to Christopher Harris, a television writer.

== Bibliography ==
- Hilary Liftin and Kate Montgomery (as co-written) (1999) Dear Exile: The True Story of Two Friends Separated (for a year) by an Ocean; Vintage Books
- Liftin, Hilary (2003) Candy and Me: A Love Story Free Press
- Hatcher, Teri and Liftin, Hilary (co-written) (2006) Burnt Toast: And Other Philosophies of Life; Hyperion Books
- Walsh, Peter (ghost written) It's All Too Much: An Easy Plan for Living a Richer Life with Less Stuff (2006) Free Press
- Spelling, Tori and Liftin, Hilary (co-written) (2008) Stori Telling; Simon Spotlight Entertainment/Simon Schuster. Received 2009 Bravo A-List Award for Best Celebrity Autobiography.
- Walsh, Peter (Ghost-written) (2008) Does This Clutter Make My Butt Look Fat?: An Easy Plan for Losing Weight and Living More Free Press
- Cyrus, Miley and Liftin, Hilary (co-written) (2009) Miles To Go; Hyperion Books
- Spelling, Tori and Liftin, Hilary (co-written) (2009) Mommywood Simon Spotlight Entertainment/Simon Schuster
- Phillips, Mackenzie and Liftin, Hilary (Co-written) (2009) High On Arrival. Simon Spotlight Entertainment/Simon Schuster
- Walsh, Peter (Ghost-written) (2009) Enough Already: Clearing Mental Clutter to Become the Best You. Free Press
- Spelling, Tori and Liftin, Hilary (co-written) (2010) Unchartered Territori. Simon Spotlight Entertainment/Simon Schuster
- Spelling, Tori and Liftin, Hilary (contributor ) (2010) Presenting...Tallulah; Illustrated by Vanessa Brantley Newton; Aladdin
- O'Neal, Tatum and Liftin, Hilary (co-written) (2011) "Found: A Daughter's Journey Home"; William Morrow.
- Liftin, Hilary (2015) "Movie Star by Lizzie Pepper"; Viking.
