= See You Again (Miley Cyrus song) =

2007 single by Miley Cyrus

- International 2008 remix

Single by Miley Cyrus

from the album Meet Miley Cyrus and Breakout
- Released: 2007
- Studio: Robert Vosgien Mastering (Burbank, California)
- Genre: Dance-rock
- Length: 3:10; 3:17 (new mix)
- Label: Hollywood
- Songwriters: Miley Cyrus; Antonina Armato; Tim James
- Producers: Antonina Armato; Tim James

Miley Cyrus singles chronology
"Ready, Set, Don't Go" (2007)	"See You Again" (2007)	"Start All Over" (2008)

Licensed audio
- "See You Again" on YouTube

"See You Again" is the debut single by American singer Miley Cyrus. It was released as the first single from Cyrus' debut studio album Meet Miley Cyrus (2007), a companion piece to the second soundtrack album from the Disney Channel original series Hannah Montana. It was written by Cyrus (credited as Destiny Hope Cyrus) with the song's producers Antonina Armato and Tim James. Later, it was remixed by Armato and James (then credited as Rock Mafia) as the closing track from Cyrus' second studio album, Breakout (2008). Musically, the track is a dance-rock song that contains influences from various musical genres, including electronic music. Lyrically, it speaks of teenage romance. The original version of the song was only released as a single in the US, Canada, Australia and New Zealand. The song was released internationally remixed by Rock Mafia.

"See You Again" received acclaim from music critics, with many complimenting its composition and Cyrus' vocals. It was her first commercially successful song; it introduced her to new audiences and new countries, paving the way for future hits. The song went top ten in the US, Canada, Hungary and Australia. A music video for the song was never filmed, but a promotional clip taken from a performance at the 2008 Disney Channel Games was released to promote the 2008 remix. The song was promoted through a multitude of live television performances. It was included on the setlist of Cyrus' headlining tours, the Best of Both Worlds Tour (2007–2008), the Wonder World Tour (2009), Gypsy Heart Tour (2011), and the Attention Tour (2021–2022). "See You Again" has been covered by various notable artists, including Little Boots and Breathe Carolina.

== Background ==
When Cyrus starred as Miley Stewart, a girl with a secret double life as pop star Hannah Montana, on the Disney Channel television series Hannah Montana, she developed fame as a teen idol and released the series' first soundtrack while being credited as Hannah Montana. In late 2006, Cyrus began execution for her debut album. Cyrus' debut studio album Meet Miley Cyrus was attached to the series' second soundtrack, Hannah Montana 2, and released as the second disc of the Hannah Montana 2: Meet Miley Cyrus (2007) double-disc album. "See You Again" was written by Cyrus, who was credited as her birth name Destiny Hope Cyrus, Antonina Armato, and Tim James. The writing group has executed numerous songs recorded by Cyrus, contributing to a large part of all three of her studio albums.

When composing tracks for Meet Miley Cyrus, Cyrus was originally very apprehensive in regards to adding "See You Again" to the album. "I'm not sure about this song. I don't think I want to put it on the album. I don't really like it that much. It's just O.K.", she said. However, she was convinced to record it and, once she listened to the finished product, she changed her mind. She thought it was odd, but in a positive light, and decided to include it on her debut album. Cyrus says "See You Again" is a dance song with a special meaning to her. It was later remixed by Rock Mafia for the release of Cyrus' second studio album Breakout (2008). It was released as the second single from Breakout on August 11, 2008.

== Composition ==
"See You Again"
An 18-second sample of "See You Again", a dance-rock song that fuses Cyrus' sultry vocals with lyrics centering around teenage romance.

"See You Again" is a dance-rock song with a length of three minutes and ten seconds. The songs contains numerous influences from electronic, new wave, and techno music. The song is set in the time signature of common time and has a fast tempo of 138 beats per minute. It is written in the key of A minor with Cyrus' vocal range spanning one octave, from the low note of G_{3} to the high note of A_{4}. Throughout the track, her edgy and sultry vocals maintain in the contralto range. The lyrics of "See You Again" are about a teenage romance. In verses, Cyrus discusses her feelings and perceptions about her love interest, such as believing the couple had previously encountered in a previous incarnation. "See You Again"'s refrains detail previous scenes of an encounter between the couple: "The last time I freaked out / I just kept looking down / I st-st-stuttered when you asked me what I'm thinking 'bout." Towards the conclusion of the refrains, Cyrus vows to redeem herself.

== Critical reception ==
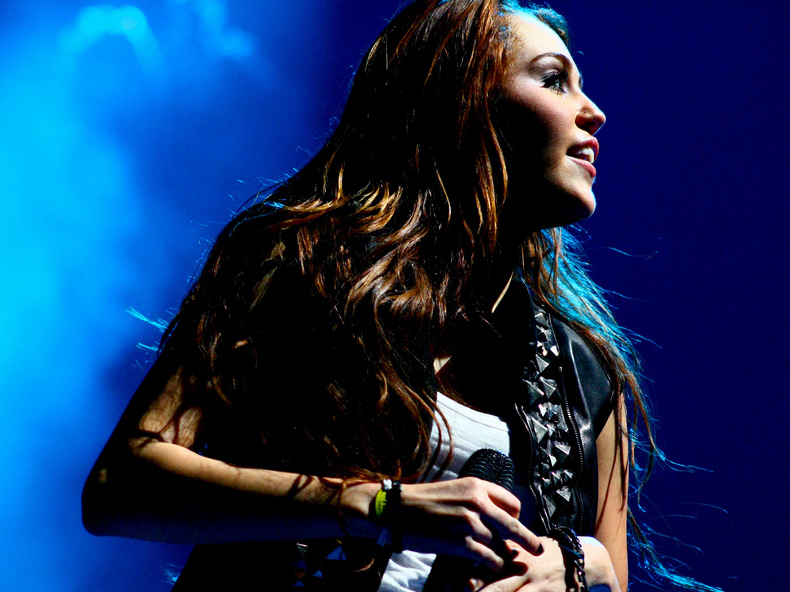
Cyrus performing "See You Again" on her Wonder World Tour

The song was met with critical acclaim. Chuck Taylor of Billboard felt that, by offering meaningful airplay to "See You Again", mainstream radio stations were getting with the program. Taylor described the song as "a sassy, uptempo stinger that adds appealing youthful buzz to the airwaves" and complimented Cyrus' vocals with comparisons to Hilary Duff and Avril Lavigne. "Cyrus [...] at last adds the missing link to TV and movie acclaim. Alas, FM, better late than never", he concluded. Sal Cinquemani of Slant Magazine said that the song "managed to click with non-tween listeners thanks to its new-wavy dance beat, spaghetti-western guitars and a surprisingly spry vocal performance that's gutsier than anything her fellow Disney Channel superstar Hilary Duff has ever put to digital."

Mikael Wood of the Los Angeles Times believed the song was "no shortage of crafty tween-rock gems". Ash Dosanjh of Yahoo! Music believed the Rock Mafia remix of the song was a so "glorious" that it signaled Breakout would do exactly that. Josh Timmermann of PopMatters referred to the remix as the best song on Breakout, describing it as a "marvelous slice of teenaged life set to club rock beats." Timmermann continued to praise the track, saying it felt "infinitely more genuine and thoughtful than" any other track on Breakout and that the small-time teen drama fit Cyrus' voice. "It sounds far less ludicrously melodramatic than it might have delivered by less forceful pipes", he concluded. George Lang of The Oklahoman thought the inclusion of the song's remix on Breakout was used to cover more musical genres in order to appeal to a wider fanbase. In 2008, the track was listed as a "Winning Song" by Broadcast Music Incorporated (BMI). In 2023, upon the release of "Flowers", Billboard staff ranked all Cyrus' lead singles from worst to best and put "See You Again" second in which Jason Lipshutz wrote that the song "transcends traditional teen pop and morphs into a rave-up for all ages when that chorus hits" and "remains a karaoke favorite, underrated workout track and humble salute to best friends named Leslie everywhere".

== Commercial performance ==
On the week ending December 22, 2007, "See You Again" debuted at number 94 on the Billboard Hot 100. In the succeeding week, the song ascended to number 78 and, on the week ending February 16, 2008, it charted at its newfound peak of number 17, therefore becoming Cyrus' best-charting effort on the Billboard Hot 100, surpassing the Hannah Montana-credited "Life's What You Make It", which peaked at number 25 in August 2007. On the week ending May 3, 2008, "See You Again" became Cyrus' first top ten single by reaching its peak at number ten on the Billboard Hot 100. "See You Again" spent a total of 27 weeks upon the chart. It also peaked at number four on Mainstream Top 40 (Pop Songs) and number twenty-one on Adult Pop Songs in the United States. The song entered at number 86 and peaked at number four on the Canadian Hot 100, its highest peak internationally. As of March 2023, "See You Again" has sold over 3,000,000 copies in the United States and was certified triple platinum by the Recording Industry Association of America (RIAA).

In Australia, "See You Again" debuted at number 25 on the week ending June 22, 2008. The following week, it ascended to number ten and, after five weeks of ascending the top ten, reached its peak at number six, where it remained for three consecutive weeks. The single was certified platinum by the Australian Recording Industry Association (ARIA) for the sale of over 70,000 copies. On the week ending August 4, 2008, "See You Again" debuted at number 32 on the New Zealand Singles Chart. It eventually peaked at number 11 and was certified gold by the Recording Industry Association of New Zealand (RIANZ) for the shipment of 7,500 copies. In the United Kingdom, the track peaked at number 11. Elsewhere in Europe, "See You Again" peaked at number 38 on the Eurochart Hot 100 Singles, number 14 on the Irish Singles Chart and number seven on the Hungarian Singles Chart.

== Live performances ==
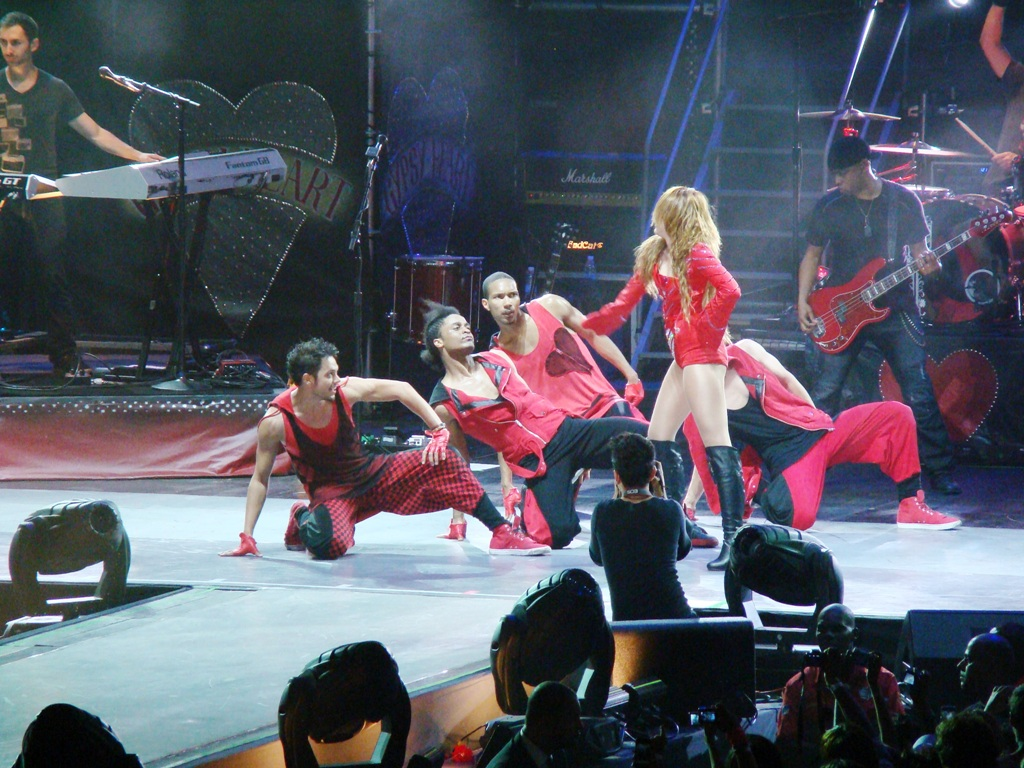
Cyrus performing "See You Again" on her Gypsy Heart Tour

Cyrus performed "See You Again" live on the 2007 Disney Channel Games held on April 27, 2007, at Walt Disney World in Orlando, Florida, as part of Disney Channel's summer-season activities. She wore a yellow and black-striped tank top, black and white-plaid skirt, high knee socks, and black sneakers in the performance. Cyrus also performed the song on Idol Gives Back, as she continued to promote the single in the United States. "See You Again" was also a part of the set list for Cyrus' first headlining concert tour, the Best of Both Worlds Tour (2007–08). Cyrus was costumed in a white tank top, studded jeans, and metallic accessories. Cyrus and several backup dancers began the performance on the upper level of the stage, where they proceeded down a ramp as they perform dance routines. Cyrus and the backup dancers roamed throughout the stage for the remainder of the performance. Jane Stevenson of the Canadian Online Explorer listed "See You Again" as one of the highlights at the concert at Air Canada Centre on December 15, 2007, in Toronto, Ontario, Canada. She said that Cyrus' wardrobe indicated that "Miley, it turns out, is the marginally tougher cookie of the two singers."

Cyrus performed "See You Again" dressed in a white vest and white pants at the opening of the 2008 Disney Channel Games, held on May 3, 2008. Hollywood Records opted not to film a music video for the song, and instead a recording of this performance was used as a promotional clip for the Rock Mafia release. In 2008, Cyrus performed the song at the 2008 Zootopia, Good Morning America, Today, and BBC Switch in the United Kingdom. Cyrus performed "See You Again", dressed in casual clothing, on the Kids' Inaugural: "We Are the Future" event. The event was held on January 19, 2009, in Washington D.C. at the Verizon Center to celebrate the inauguration of Barack Obama as President of the United States. Cyrus performed the song along with several other songs on April 24, 2009, in a London Apple Store. These performances were recorded and sold exclusively by the United Kingdom iTunes Store as a live extended play titled iTunes Live from London. The song has been performed at the twentieth annual A Time for Heroes Celebrity Carnival, Rock in Rio concerts in Lisbon, Portugal, and Madrid, Spain, the 1515 Club in Paris, France, Heaven and G-A-Y in London, England.

The song was also used as the penultimate number of Cyrus' Wonder World Tour (2009), her first world tour. The performances began with backup dancers in bodysuits marching as they emerged from the bottom of the stage. The banging of a gong announced Cyrus' arrival. She dressed in a white tank top and shorts, boots, and a metallic vest. Cyrus and the multiple backup dancers performed elaborate dance routines as images on overhead screens depicted geometric patterns. The dancers exited the stage by throwing themselves inside the stage as Cyrus prepared for the next performance. Mikael Wood of The Los Angeles Times, who attended the September 22, 2009, concert at the Staples Center in Los Angeles, California, referred to the performance of "See You Again" as an uptempo highlight that was, however, unable "to give her fans a deeper idea of who she is and what her music means".

Cyrus performed "See You Again" for the BBC Radio 1 Live Lounge accompanied with other songs like "Malibu", "Younger Now", "Party in the U.S.A." and a cover of Roberta Flack's "The First Time Ever I Saw Your Face". It was the first performance of the song in 6 years.

Cyrus delighted fans by performing 'See You Again' during her 2021 headlining set at Lollapalooza Music Festival in Chicago.

== Cover versions ==
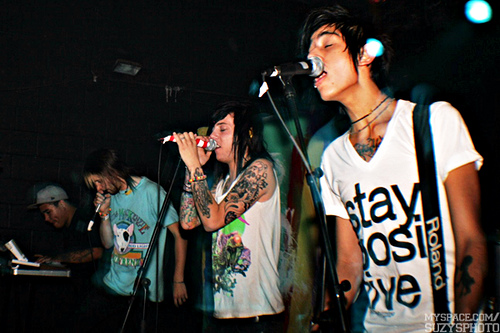
Electropop duo, Breathe Carolina covered "See You Again" on the compilation Punk Goes Pop 2.

English electropop singer Little Boots recorded a cover version of "See You Again" that surfaced the Internet in December 2008. In an interview with Digital Spy, Little Boots said, "That's a wicked song! The line 'My best friend Lesley said, "Oh she's just being Miley"' is awesome. Me and my friend have been obsessing over that lyrics for ages now, it's getting ridiculous!" Breathe Carolina's act consisted of a balance of pop punk and rock music, which stood out to their record label, Fearless Records. Because of it, Fearless Records decided to reserve a spot for them on their compilation Punk Goes Pop 2 (2009), where they performed a cover version of "See You Again", produced by Mike Green. Breathe Carolina included their version of "See You Again" in their set list for the Warped Tour 2009. The cover later appeared on the deluxe edition of the band's second studio album Hello Fascination (2010).

== Release history ==
Region	Date	Format
United Kingdom	August 21, 2008	CD single
Australia	April 13, 2009	Digital download (Moto Blanco Radio Edit)

== Charts ==
=== Weekly charts ===
Chart (2007–2008)	Peak position
Australia (ARIA)	6
Austria (Ö3 Austria Top 40)	30
Belgium (Ultratop 50 Wallonia)	43
Canada Hot 100 (Billboard)	4
Canada CHR/Top 40 (Billboard)	5
Canada Hot AC (Billboard)	3
Germany (GfK)	52
Hungary (Single Top 40)	7
Ireland (IRMA)	13
Mexico Anglo (Monitor Latino)	20
New Zealand (Recorded Music NZ)	11
Romania (Romanian Top 100)	81
UK Singles (Official Charts)	11
US Billboard Hot 100	10
US Adult Pop Airplay (Billboard)	21
US Pop Airplay (Billboard)	4

=== Year-end charts ===
Chart (2008)	Position
Australia (ARIA)	26
Canada (Canadian Hot 100)	21
New Zealand (Recorded Music NZ)	43
UK Singles (OCC)	103
US Billboard Hot 100	31
US Mainstream Top 40 (Billboard)	15

== Certifications ==
Region	Certification	Certified units/sales
Australia (ARIA)	3× Platinum	210,000^{‡}
New Zealand (RMNZ)	Platinum	30,000^{‡}
United Kingdom (BPI)	Gold	400,000^{‡}
United States (RIAA)	3× Platinum	3,000,000^{‡}
^{‡} Sales+streaming figures based on certification alone.
