= Hannah Montana season 2 =

Season of TV series

Hannah Montana
- Season 2
- Australian DVD cover
- Starring: Miley Cyrus; Emily Osment; Mitchel Musso; Jason Earles; Moises Arias; Billy Ray Cyrus
- No. of episodes: 29

Release
- Original network: Disney Channel
- Original release: April 23, 2007 – October 12, 2008

Season chronology
- ← Previous; Season 1 Next → Season 3

The second season of Hannah Montana aired on Disney Channel from April 23, 2007 to October 12, 2008. Production of the season began in November 2006, and ended in September 2007. During this season, Miley and Lilly fight more, Oliver gets an alibi to hang out with Hannah Montana, and Miley grows closer to Jake Ryan.

== Production ==
Production on the second season began in Los Angeles, California in November 2006, and concluded in September 2007.

== Casting ==
Season 2 cast L-R: Moisés Arias, Jason Earles, Billy Ray Cyrus, Miley Cyrus, Mitchel Musso, Emily Osment

Moisés Arias becomes a regular cast member. In "My Best-Friend's Boyfriend", Larry David was approached by the producers about being on the show when he attended a Hannah Montana taping with his two daughters, who were fans of the show. He agreed, and appeared in the episode with his daughters, playing himself as a "frustrated restaurant patron". David's daughters are "huge fans" of Hannah Montana. Heather Locklear was also convinced to guest star after attending with her kids. Camryn Manheim and Brooke Shields also have made guest appearances because their kids enjoy the show. John D'Aquino and Madison Pettis from Cory in the House make guest appearances as their characters in a special crossover episode. The Jonas Brothers also guest star in an episode as well as Selena Gomez playing Hannah's new rival, Mikayla, for two episodes.

Dwayne "The Rock" Johnson appears in "Don't Stop 'Til You Get the Phone" as part of the Rock Block, in which he guest-starred in episodes of Hannah Montana, Cory in the House, and Wizards of Waverly Place as a promotion for Disney's film The Game Plan.

== Music ==
"I Want You to Want Me... to Go to Florida" features the ballad "Ready, Set, Don't Go" by Billy Ray Cyrus. It details his feelings concerning his daughter Miley's move to Los Angeles to star in Hannah Montana, while he stayed behind in Nashville. The episode also features the song "If Cupid Had a Heart", by Julie Griffin, and written by Gordon Pogoda. Mikayla (Selena Gomez), lip-syncs it in the episode. A soundtrack for the season featuring 10 songs sung by Miley Cyrus as Hannah Montana was released on June 26, 2007.

== DVD releases ==
The second, Wish Gone Amiss Weekend DVD, which was released November 27, 2007, features the "When You Wish You Were the Star" episode and a Hannah Montana bonus "I Wish I May, I Wish I Might: A Guide to Making Wishes" hosted by Jason Earles. The Volume 4: One in a Million DVD which released January 29, 2008, includes four episodes of Hannah Montana. "Lilly's Mom Has Got It Goin' On", "Me and Mr. Jonas and Mr. Jonas and Mr. Jonas", "I Will Always Loathe You" and "That's What Friends Are For?" were included in the DVD. The DVD also features a That's So Raven episode "Run Raven Run", "Come Feud with Me" – the top 10 Disney Channel feuds, as well as the "One in a Million" and "True Friend" music videos. In Australia, following the release of the Complete First Season on DVD in November, Season 2: Part 1 and Season 2: Part 2 were released soon after. In part one, episodes 1-15 were included, while remaining episodes 16-29 were released in part 2. On the case, there are images from the episode "No Sugar, Sugar", but the episode was not released on the disc. A full season collection was released on November 25, 2009.

== Episodes ==
Season 2 started with a week of 5 new episodes. The average ratings for the 5 new episodes were 3.7 million viewers. Season 2 had several special episodes and marathons. The first special was "Achy Jakey Heart", in which Miley revealed her secret to Jake Ryan (Cody Linley). The second special, "Me and Mr. Jonas and Mr. Jonas and Mr. Jonas", which guest starred the Jonas Brothers, was aired with the premiere of High School Musical 2. Dwayne "The Rock" Johnson appeared in "Don't Stop 'Til You Get the Phone" as part of the Rock Block, which saw him guest-star in episodes of Hannah Montana and Cory in the House as a promotion for Disney's film The Game Plan. "(We're So Sorry) Uncle Earl" aired in a week-long Disney Channel event "Sweet Niblets, We're Related?". In 3 episodes this season, Hannah Montana wins an award.

No. overall	No. in season	Title	Directed by	Written by	Original release date	Prod. code	Viewers (millions)
27	1	"Me and Rico Down by the Schoolyard"	Roger S. Christiansen	Heather Wordham	April 23, 2007	203	3.5
Miley, Lilly, and Oliver start high school and Rico (who is also in high school after skipping a few grades) soon learns what he thinks is Miley's "big secret" and blackmails her with it by making her be his girlfriend. Lilly and Oliver later learn that the "secret" was just Miley's attachment to her teddy bear. At the end, Rico makes Miley feel bad so she tells him to kiss her on the cheek, but he turns his head and he kisses her on the lips. Meanwhile, Jackson's new friend Thor causes him major humiliation.
28	2	"Cuffs Will Keep Us Together"	Roger S. Christiansen	Steven Peterman	April 24, 2007	201	3.5
Miley and Lilly start a fight after Lilly doesn't choose Miley first in a flag football game in gym class. After Oliver gets annoyed with their behavior, he handcuffs them together right before Hannah's big award show. The girls have to work it out so Hannah can get ready. Robby gives Jackson the silent treatment when he gets tired of telling Jackson the same thing multiple times.
29	3	"You Are So Sue-able to Me"	Roger S. Christiansen	Sally Lapiduss	April 25, 2007	202	3.9
Lilly gets asked out to a dance, but Miley thinks she acts too much like "one of the guys" and gives her a big makeover, however the person who asks her out doesn't like "the new Lilly" so he stands Lilly up, prompting Miley and Lilly to take him to "The Teen Court" (A TV show involving teens on 'trial' for causing pain and humiliation to others). Jackson wins two tickets to the Lakers game and invites Thor, but Robby assumes that it will be a "father and son" outing, leaving Jackson trying to decide between the two without hurting the other's feelings. At the end of the episode Miley realizes it was wrong to change Lilly.
30	4	"Get Down, Study-udy-udy"	Roger S. Christiansen	Andrew Green	April 26, 2007	204	3.7
When Miley receives a poor mid-term grade in Biology, Robby says she must ace her mid-term exam or it's no European tour for Hannah. Meanwhile, Jackson volunteers to take care of Thor's pet parrot, Snowball, but the talking bird creates problems for Jackson.
31	5	"I Am Hannah, Hear Me Croak"	Roger S. Christiansen	Michael Poryes	April 27, 2007	206	3.5
Miley loses her voice after six encores at a Hannah concert, and learns that only surgery will fix the problem. Fearful of what a botched surgery could do to her career, Miley's late mom (Brooke Shields) appears in Miley's dreams to reassure her that nothing would change if Miley's surgery didn't go right. Susan tells Miley that she is alive and permanently stays in all of her dreams, Jackson’s dreams and Robby Ray’s dreams. Susan scolds Robby Ray for giving Miley hot chocolate before bed. In the end, Robby has a separate dream involving Miley and her mother.
32	6	"You Gotta Not Fight for Your Right to Party"	Jody Margolin Hahn	Steven James Meyer	May 4, 2007	207	3.5
After Jackson's bathroom is destroyed, Robby makes Miley share hers with him, resulting in a war between Miley and Jackson. Robby grounds Miley and Jackson because of the fighting but they sneak out using Thor's truck. When the truck nearly falls off a cliff (that turns out to be no higher than 2 feet) they managed to escape, they are brought closer together. Meanwhile, Lilly and Oliver disguise themselves as Miley and Jackson to hide their absence from Robby.
33	7	"My Best Friend's Boyfriend"	Roger S. Christiansen	Jay J. Demopoulos	May 18, 2007	209	3.8
Lilly dates a boy, Lucas, and she realizes he is the greatest boyfriend she ever has, and Miley couldn't be happier for her, but eventually becomes annoyed with their affection. Miley catches Lucas kissing another girl and tells Lilly about it, but she thinks that Miley is jealous and snubbed her. Lilly then finds that Miley is right about Lucas and dumps him. Meanwhile, Rico sets an alarm system because someone or something stole his sunglasses. But Jackson gets annoyed by the alarm system.
34	8	"Take This Job and Love It"	Roger S. Christiansen	Sally Lapiduss	June 16, 2007	210	N/A
Miley, as Hannah, gets a date with a cute new backup dancer, but the date is a disaster when Roxy invites herself along. Tired of Roxy's overprotectiveness, Miley says she needs space, which makes Roxy leave to get another job. After a series of disappointing interviews for a new head of security for Hannah, Miley realizes she misses Roxy and tries to get her to come back. Meanwhile, Jackson pretends to be a professional motor-cross racer to impress a girl. Note: This episode is a crossover with Cory in the House.
35	9	"Achy Jakey Heart" (Part 1)	Rich Correll	Douglas Lieblein	June 24, 2007	211	7.4
When Jake returns and re-kindles his relationship with Miley, she begins to feel guilty for keeping her "Hannah" secret from him. When Jackson gets fired, he and Oliver open a stand that sells "Cheese Jerky", which becomes more successful than Rico's. Rico then attempts to steal their recipe.
36	10	"Achy Jakey Heart" (Part 2)	Roger S. Christiansen	Andrew Green	June 24, 2007	212	7.4
Jake creates a "normal person" disguise for his dates with Miley but still expects the star treatment he's been used to for so long, Miley considers breaking up with him, but fears he will get mad and reveal her secret. Meanwhile, Jackson and Oliver's Cheese Jerky stand goes from success to failure when they have to pay off their supply costs with most of their profits. As a result, Jackson goes back to working at Rico's, bewildering Rico. In order to make Rico he has lost his mind, Jackson gaslights him and pretends as if he never quit and opened the Cheese Jerky stand.
37	11	"Sleepwalk This Way"	Roger S. Christansen	Heather Wordham	July 7, 2007	213	3.2
Robby wrote a new song but he refuses to play it on the guitar. Miley finds the song and reads the lyrics, only to find that the lyrics don't make any sense and doesn't like it, without telling her dad. Because she hates the song, she start suffering from sleepwalking. It happens again in school during class when Miley had insulted a science teacher's appearance (while sleepwalking) and got in trouble and got sent to the principal's office as a result. She returns home and tells Jackson about how she hated the song and needs to confess to her dad. Unfortunately, Robby overhears it and got upset. She tells him about, only to discover that she wrote the song when she was 5. She apologizes to him, and Robby forgives her. The real song is Bigger than Us made a big hit.
38	12	"When You Wish You Were the Star"	Roger S. Christansen	Douglas Lieblein	July 13, 2007	205	5.5
When Hannah has to turn down a date with Jesse McCartney because Miley and Lilly have a science project due the next day, Miley wishes on a shooting star that she didn't have dual lives. When her wish comes true, Hannah finds that being a superstar 24/7 isn't all it's cracked up to be when she realizes Miley never met Lilly and Oliver, so Lilly is friends with Amber and Ashley, Oliver sells peeks into Hannah’s windows with Rico, Jackson moved out and became a hermit and her dad Robbie married a young gold digger named Candace. Susan Stewart appears as an angel and tells Miley that just being Miley is enough and Miley’s wish becomes undone.
39	13	"I Want You to Want Me... to Go to Florida"	Roger S. Christansen	Michael Poryes	July 21, 2007	208	4.5
Miley wants to go to Florida for a charity concert as Hannah to beat her singing rival Mikayla. Just days before they are to leave, Robby injures his back (on Jackson's workout machine) and won't let Miley go. Miley stubbornly defies her father and leaves for Florida with Roxy. Despite her best attempts to not get caught, she is discovered when Robby gets on the plane and clues Roxy in on the truth. In a heart to heart, Robby realizes Miley's need to be there and ultimately wishes her well. During their talk Robby shows her the lyrics to his new song "Ready, Set, Don't Go", which sums up how hard it is for him watching his daughter grow up.
40	14	"Everybody Was Best-Friend Fighting"	Jody Margolin Hahn	Sally Lapiduss	July 29, 2007	215	4.8
Hannah is invited to play in a celebrity tennis tournament, and invites Lola (Lilly) and Mike (Oliver) to attend, but the two of them fight. Jackson tricks Rico into thinking he is "cursed" by paying a psychic to tell him he is an evil boy.
41	15	"Song Sung Bad"	Roger S. Christiansen	Ingrid Escajeda	August 4, 2007	214	4.7
Lilly records a song for her mother, but Miley alters her voice to make it sound better, prompting Lilly to enter in Karaoke night. At her performance, Miley sings for her using a microphone outside the room for Lilly to lip sync to, but is exposed after being scared by a spider she accidentally let loose. Meanwhile, after a faulty attempt at getting Sarah to like Rico, Jackson has to deal with her when she thinks he likes her.
42	16	"Me and Mr. Jonas and Mr. Jonas and Mr. Jonas"	Mark Cendrowski	Douglas Lieblein	August 17, 2007	217	10.7
When Hannah and Robbie Ray meet The Jonas Brothers, Miley becomes jealous of how much time he spends with the three boys. She and Lilly dress up as two male singers (Milo and Otis) as part of a plan to break up their "bromance". Meanwhile, Jackson tries to break the world pogo-stick record.
43	17	"Don't Stop 'Til You Get the Phone"	Rich Correll	Michael Poryes	September 21, 2007	222	5.1
In order to get the hot new Z-Phone, Miley gets Lilly to take an embarrassing paparazzi picture of Hannah to sell to a tabloid, but the picture shows a necklace that says 'Miley', so they attempt to trade the Hannah photo for a picture of "The Rock" with makeup on. Jackson gets a sunburn at a volleyball game, and doesn't want Robby to find out.
44	18	"That's What Friends Are For?"	Mark Cendrowski	Douglas Lieblein	October 19, 2007	224	5.4
Miley gets jealous when Mikayla is cast as Jake's love interest in his next movie, so she schemes to get Mikayla fired from the film. Rico bets Oliver and Jackson that they can't go as long as he can without taking a shower.
45	19	"Lilly's Mom Has Got It Goin' On"	Jody Margolin Hahn	Norm Gunzenhauser	November 10, 2007	216	5.5
Miley and Lilly envision becoming sisters when they notice a spark of love between Miley's dad and Lilly's mom (Heather Locklear). The girls then try to get the two to go out on a date, but when it goes wrong, the two blame each other's parent so the two girls start fighting. Meanwhile, Jackson and Rico switch places to see who could last in each other's shoes.
46	20	"I Will Always Loathe You"	Roger S. Christiansen	Michael Poryes	December 7, 2007	218	4.4
Mammaw Ruthie and Aunt Dolly return to celebrate Hannah's latest award but Dolly and Ruthie fight too much over Elvis Presley and ruin Hannah's award speech. Miley was very angry and embarrassed. Oliver agrees to help Rico film a commercial, but Rico can't shake his fear of being in front of a camera. As a result, they try to find another kid who could play Rico, but Rico shoots them all down, including his own brother (played by Mateo Arias, Moises Arias's real brother). Rico finds a tall, muscular guy to play him, much to Oliver's chagrin. However, the guy's voice turns out to be too high, so they film the commercial with Rico dubbing over his voice.
47	21	"Bye Bye Ball"	Sean Lambert	Heather Wordham	January 13, 2008	220	4.2
After Jackson ruins Miley's 'Beary Bear', Miley plots revenge and destroys his special baseball signed by Joey Vitolo (Joey Fatone). When Jackson feels guilty and fixes Beary Bear, Miley goes to great lengths to replace Jackson's ball – luckily for Miley, Joey Vitolo's daughter (Juliette Goglia) is a Hannah fan. Meanwhile, Robbie attempts to build a bookshelf.
48	22	"(We're So Sorry) Uncle Earl"	Rich Correll	Robin J. Stein	March 21, 2008	226	3.6
Uncle Earl (David Koechner) arrives for a visit with the intention of becoming a rockstar. Barney Bittman (Gilbert Gottfried), a music critic renowned for his harsh criticism of popular performers, is planning on reviewing Hannah Montana.
49	23	"The Way We Almost Weren't"	Rich Correll	Andrew Green	May 4, 2008	219	3.1
While returning from Hannah's New Mexico tour, Miley nearly gets struck by lightning and dreams about how her parents first met at a diner and tries to make Robby and Miley's mom meet before she and Jackson totally disappear. Meanwhile, Lilly and Oliver get stuck to chairs, and attempt to get unstuck so they don't miss the Maroon 5 concert.
50	24	"You Didn't Say It Was Your Birthday"	Rich Correll	Heather Wordham	July 6, 2008	225	5.1
Miley and Jackson forget that it was their father's 40th birthday, and argue over why he is annoyed at them. When they figure it out, they go to great lengths to make it up to him. Robby Ray forgives them sincerely. Lilly and Oliver find a chip shaped like Darth Vader and try to sell it.
51	25	"Hannah in the Streets with Diamonds"	Roger S. Christiansen	Jay J. Demopoulos & Steven James Meyer	July 20, 2008	228	3.8
Hannah is chosen to be inducted on a walk of fame, but Miley's upset when her prime location is suddenly downgraded to make room for a star puppet, "Pancake Buffalo", with a superstar sized attitude. Meanwhile, Robbie takes over Jackson's shift when he can't get his car to go.
52	26	"Yet Another Side of Me"	Shannon Flynn	Story by : Heather Wordham; Teleplay by : Andrew Green & Sally Lapiduss	August 3, 2008	229	4.6
Hannah meets her idol, Isis, who constantly changes her image to keep things fresh. Hannah fears she will lose her audience if she doesn't follow suit, but her image makeover (Anti-Hannah) doesn't go as she imagined after a nightmare about performing for the Sunshine Girls. Meanwhile, Jackson is promised a raise by Rico, on the condition that he makes the sound of a dog when somebody say the word "dog." This makes Jackson be in a lot of trouble with an older boy, who injures him. Finally, Jackson tells Rico that if he was nicer, he would have lots of friends. Note: In later airings and the Disney+ version, Isis was renamed to "Ice", likely due to the fact that The Walt Disney Company wanted to dissociate from the Islamic State extremist organization.
53	27	"The Test of My Love"	Rich Correll	Jay J. Demopoulos & Steven James Meyer	August 31, 2008	221	3.9
Miley starts dating a rich boy, Trey Harris. However, Trey's parents are rude to Miley because she is from Tennessee, so she tries to impress them by pretending to be rich and fancy. Meanwhile, Robbie and Jackson attempt to clean out Jackson's room.
54	28	"Joannie B. Goode"	Rondell Sheridan	Andrew Green	September 14, 2008	227	4.6
Oliver and Joannie start dating, and Oliver wants Miley and Lilly to be friends with her. After a sleepover, Lilly and Joannie realize they have more in common than they thought, and Miley worries that Lilly won't be her best friend anymore. Meanwhile, Jackson gets a date with Rico's cousin.
55	29	"We're All on This Date Together"	Roger S. Christiansen	Steven Peterman	October 12, 2008	230	4.4
Miley's previous crush Johnny Collins (Corbin Bleu) wins a date with Hannah in a charity auction, but Hannah is forced into letting Rico join too. He wound up making the date miserable for both Johnny and Hannah. Angry, Johnny and Hannah kick Rico out. Meanwhile, Roxy's old enemy from high school comes to visit, so she begs Robby and Jackson to pretend to be her “family”.
