= Hannah Montana Forever =

Hannah Montana Forever may refer to:

- Hannah Montana season 4, which was marketed as Hannah Montana Forever
- Hannah Montana Forever (soundtrack), the soundtrack for the fourth season
