= Miles to Go =

Book about Miley Cyrus

- Cover of Miles to Go
- Author: Miley Cyrus with Hilary Liftin
- Cover artist: Miley Cyrus
- Language: English
- Subject: Autobiography
- Publisher: Disney/Hyperion
- Publication date: March 3, 2009
- Publication place: United States
- Media type: Print (Hardcover)
- Pages: 280 pp
- ISBN: 1-4231-1992-4
- OCLC: 244417637
- LC Class: ML3930.C98 A3 2009

Miles to Go is an autobiography by Miley Cyrus, co-written by Hilary Liftin and published by Disney Hyperion in March 2009. The memoir discusses Cyrus's relationship with her parents, her thoughts on the media, her love life, her future ambitions and milestones she still has to reach in her life. Miles to Go reached #1 on the New York Times children’s best seller list. A second edition to the book was released in Australia in December 2009 and in the UK on 1 March 2010.

Miles to Go has sold more than 2 million copies, selling over 1,000 copies the first day of its release. On a Today Show interview in April 2009, Cyrus said, "In my book, I want readers to feel what I feel; the emotion and power. I've explained how things went through in my life and how I've done it all. I just don't want my fans to come up to me and say all these things saying that famous is the best thing in the world. The popularity is pretty high and I want readers to understand that it is not that way about being a celebrity and not read it all for nothing." The book debuted on USA Today Best-Selling Books list at #80 on March 12, 2009. It then peaked at #43 on April 16, 2009 – the premiere week of Hannah Montana: The Movie and though not an official category in the Guinness (Book of) World Records she is believed to (at a time) be one of the top 25 youngest people(/teenagers) to have a best-selling autobiography, in a tie with Malala, Gabby Douglas and Justin Bieber who also released theirs at age 16.

The book, in which Cyrus writes about how she is an ordinary girl living her dream life, includes stories, poems, songs, photos and quotations from the Bible.

Six more editions of the book have been released since its first release in March 2009.
