= Life's What You Make It (Hannah Montana song) =

Song by Hannah Montana

from the album Hannah Montana 2
- Released: June 26, 2007
- Studio: I.D.E.A.S. Studios (Miami, FL); Strawberrybee Studios (New York, NY)
- Genre: Pop rock
- Length: 3:11
- Label: Walt Disney
- Songwriters: Matthew Gerrard; Robbie Nevil

"Life's What You Make It" is a song by fictional character Hannah Montana, recorded by American singer and actress Miley Cyrus for the soundtrack album Hannah Montana 2 (2007), which accompanied the second season of the Disney Channel series Hannah Montana. It premiered on Radio Disney. It was also performed at the Disney Channel Games 2007 concert. The promotional music video for the song is the performance of the song at the Hannah Montana 2 concert taping. Another promotional music video shows the concert performance from the Disney Channel Games opening ceremonies as well as some clips of the cast of Hannah Montana at Walt Disney World's Magic Kingdom. "Life's What You Make It" has peaked at number 7 on the iTunes Top Songs list.

The song debuted at number 25 on the U.S. Billboard Hot 100 in July 2007, in the same week that Hannah Montana 2: Meet Miley Cyrus debuted at number one on the album chart. This song was Hannah Montana's highest debut entry, later beaten by "He Could Be The One", which entered at number 10. In March 2023, "Life's What You Make It" was certified gold by the Recording Industry Association of America (RIAA) for shipping over 500,000 copies.

A Hannah Montana DVD titled Life's What You Make It, was released on October 9, 2007.

== Charts ==
Chart (2007)	Peak position
U.S. Billboard Hot 100	25
U.S. Billboard Pop 100	24

== Certification ==
Region	Certification	Certified units/sales
United States (RIAA)	Gold	500,000^{‡}
^{‡} Sales+streaming figures based on certification alone.
