= Breakout (Miley Cyrus song) =

Song by Miley Cyrus

from the album Breakout
- Recorded: March 2008
- Studio: Annetenna Studios (Los Angeles, California)
- Genre: Pop rock
- Length: 3:24
- Label: Hollywood
- Songwriters: Ted Bruner; Trey Vittetoe; Gina Schock
- Producers: Scott Cutler; Anne Preven

"Breakout" is a song by American singer Miley Cyrus. It was released on her second album of the same name as its opening track. The track was originally recorded by American singer Katy Perry as a demo track for her album One of the Boys but due to not being included in the album, the song was passed on to Cyrus. "Breakout" is a pop rock song whose instrumentation includes keyboard, guitar, and drums while lyrics discuss growing up and being carefree.

Contemporary critics received "Breakout" very well, appreciating its lyrical content. Digital downloads began immediately after the Breakout's release on July 22, 2008, and it charted at numbers 45 in Canada, 56 in the United States, and 94 in Australia. Cyrus performed the song in several venues; her first, in the 2008 Disney Channel Games was used as a promotional music video and on her first world tour, the Wonder World Tour, it was the opening number.

== Development ==
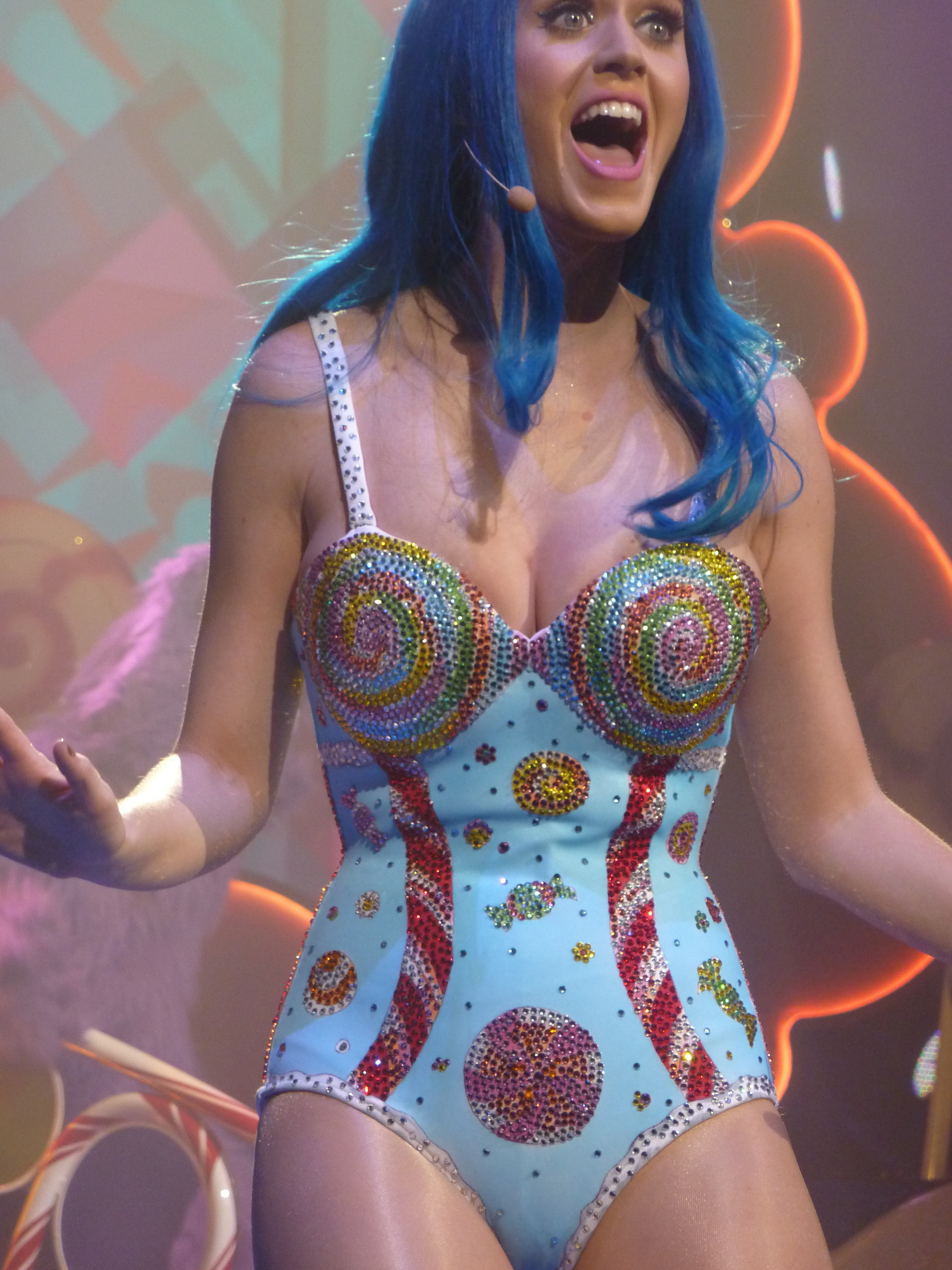
"Breakout" was originally recorded by Katy Perry for her album One of the Boys.

"Breakout" was written by Ted Bruner, Trey Vittetoe and Gina Schock of The Go-Go's. It was first recorded by American singer Katy Perry, recording the track as a demo for her album One of the Boys, though it was never fully executed for the album and was passed to Cyrus, on whose version Perry sings backing vocals, soon after a version with Perry leaked on the Internet. Perry discussed her role with Bliss magazine: "My vocals are actually on Breakout. I thought, 'Yes, I'm singing on a Miley single'." Cyrus said naming the album Breakout was influenced by the song as it was "one of [her] favorite songs" on the album; this was because the song is feminine but has appeals to different age groups: "Moms, dads, sisters, brothers can, you know, relate to it. And it's basically because you just want to go out and have fun with your friends and sometimes, you know, go out dancing and let loose once in a while."

== Composition ==
"Breakout" (2008)
A sample of Miley Cyrus' "Breakout". The song is a pop number with lyrics about being carefree. It features background vocals by American pop singer Katy Perry.

"Breakout" is a pop rock song lasting three minutes and twenty-six seconds. Written in the key of E major, it follows the chord progression G5—Dsus—Csus2—Dsus, beginning with a fast beat, composed of chiming electric guitar and drums and later progressing to "the snares skip and the keyboards shimmer". In the view of Chris William of Entertainment Weekly, "Breakout"'s lyrics are "a harangue against life's cruelest inequities", drawing attention to the opening verse, "Every week's the same/Stuck in school's so lame/My parents say that I'm lazy/Getting up at 8 a.m.'s crazy/Tired of bein' told what to do/So unfair, so uncool," though adding that the song was a sign that the "little girl isn't growing up". However, Mikael Wood of the Los Angeles Times said the song was indeed about growing up fast, referencing the lines "It feels so good to let go" and "Wish it would never end" and Jody Rosen of Rolling Stone also believed "she's venting the frustrations of a teen who's too grown-up to submit to her parents, teachers or anyone else" with the lines "tired of bein' told what to do".

== Critical reception ==
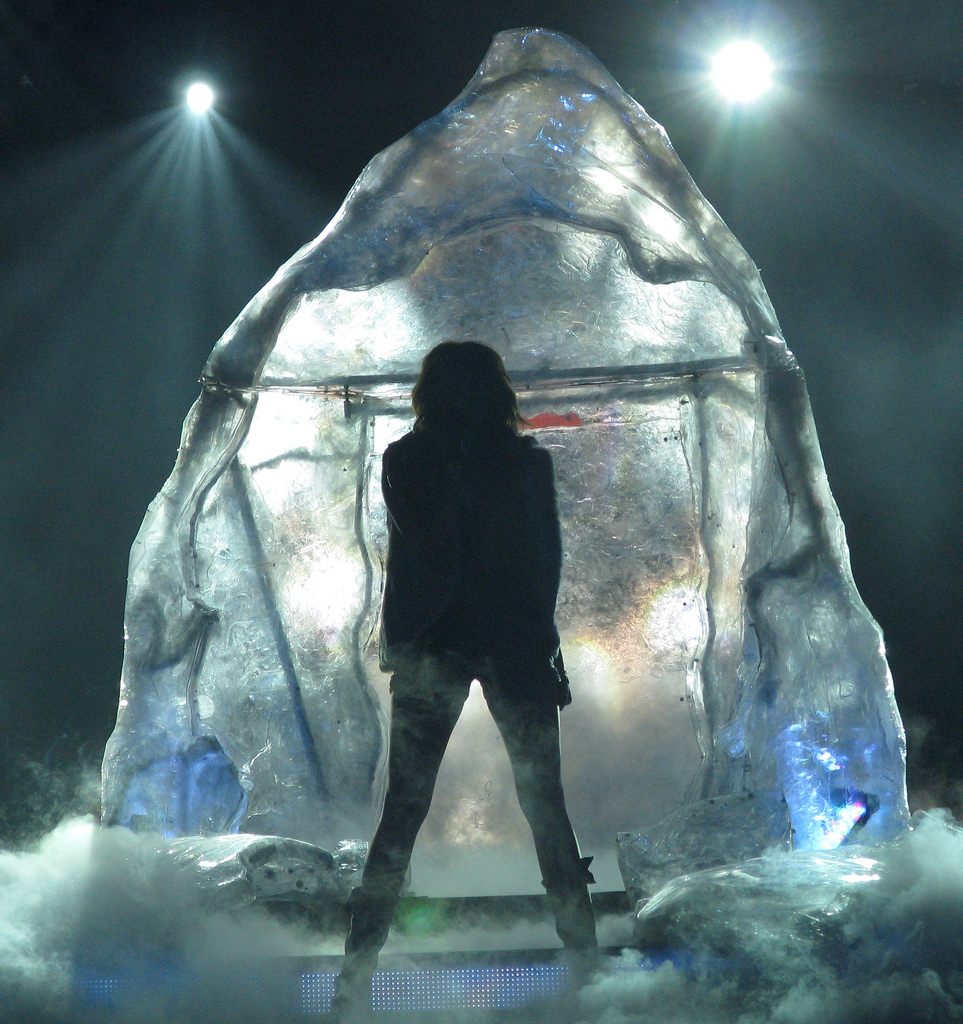
Cyrus breaking out of a crystal-ice dome to perform "Breakout" in the Wonder World Tour.

"Breakout" received positive responses from contemporary critics, with Chris William, writing for Entertainment Weekly stating that Gina Schock left influences from The Go-Go's' 1982 hit single "Vacation" with "just the right amount of maturing". Mikael Wood of the Los Angeles Times called the song "a slightly tougher, more guitar-based sound than last year's Meet Miley Cyrus", while Bill Lamb of About.com said the song was one of the "top tracks on Breakout" and Heather Phares of AllMusic said the song's "school girl rebellion" was "designed to present the feisty, carefree Miley".

According to Sarah Rodman of The Boston Globe, "Breakout" is "pure pop realm with the Go-Go's-style fizz". Ash Dosanjh of Yahoo! Music said, "You can forgive Cyrus's lack of poetic profundity because this is a dancefloor smash complete with ecstatic beats pummelling throughout." Along with "7 Things", Robert Christgau called the song "one of the best of Breakout". Ben Ratliff wrote for The New York Times that "Breakout" "appeals to both age groups", adding, "it's a girls-only call to fun, but it hints at a decadent, school-free future." However, Sal Cinquemani of Slant Magazine described "Breakout" as a "noxious Avril Lavigne knockoff— an anti-education screed filled with declarations".

== Chart performance ==
Despite not being released as a single, "Breakout" received exclusive airplay on Radio Disney and charted from the strength of digital download sales. On the week ending August 9, 2008, "Breakout" debuted and peaked at number fifty-six in the Billboard Hot 100 where it spent seven consecutive weeks. In the same week, "Breakout" was placed at number twenty-seven on Hot Digital Songs and entered the Canadian Hot 100 at number forty-five, where it peaked, spending three consecutive weeks on that chart. "Breakout" also debuted and peaked at number ninety-four in the Australian Singles Chart.

== Live performances ==
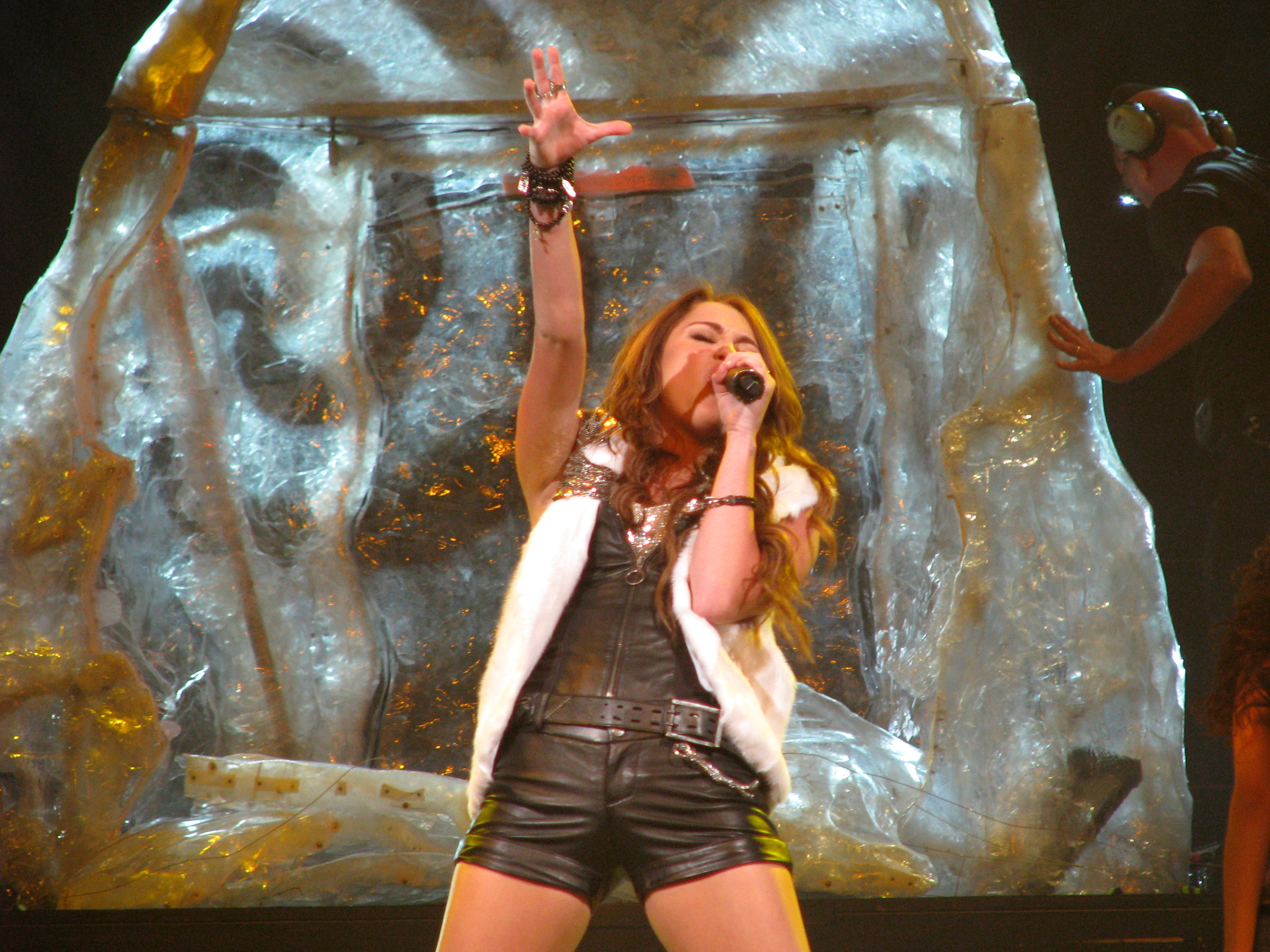
Cyrus performing "Breakout" as the opening number of the Wonder World Tour.

Cyrus premiered "Breakout" at the opening of the 2008 Disney Channel Games, held on May 4, 2008 at Walt Disney World in Orlando, Florida, as part of Disney Channel's summer-season activities. During performance, a recording of which was aired as a promotional music video on the Disney Channel, Cyrus was dressed in a short, sequined black dress with a red tee shirt and black leggings underneath. On May 17, she performed the song at the 2008 Zootopia and, on July 25, in New York City, at the Rockefeller Center, which was broadcast by The Today Show. On June 7, 2009, Cyrus performed the song at twentieth annual A Time for Heroes Celebrity Carnival, an outdoor carnival supporting the Elizabeth Glaser Pediatric AIDS Foundation.

"Breakout" was on the set list of Cyrus's 2009 Wonder World Tour, her first world tour. Cyrus performed the song as the opening number at each venue while wearing a black leather tank top and hot pants and a white fur vest. The performances began with Cyrus trapped in a huge, crystal-like ice dome which emerged from the bottom of the stage. As she breaks out of the cocoon, Cyrus begins to sing "Breakout", gradually switching from slow to upbeat tempo and, towards the end of the performances, she and the backup dancers perform on movable scaffolding. Melinda M. Thompson of The Oregonian reported that, in the September 14 concert in Portland, Oregon, at the Rose Garden Arena, drew a large response, bringing "screaming teens to their feet as she hit the stage ready to party". Lael Loewenstein of Variety stated that the performance in the September 22 concert in Los Angeles, California, at the Staples Center, touched "on the theme of self-reinvention", a theme which Loewenstein thought was to "announce her image reboot". She later performed the song at the Rock in Rio concerts in Lisbon, Portugal and Madrid, Spain.

== Charts ==
Chart (2008)	Peak position
Australian Singles Chart	94
Canadian Hot 100	45
U.S. Billboard Hot 100	56
