= Wonder World Tour =

2009 concert tour by Miley Cyrus

- Transcontinental tour by Miley Cyrus
- Location: Europe; North America
- Associated album: Breakout; The Time of Our Lives
- Start date: September 14, 2009
- End date: December 29, 2009
- Legs: 2
- No. of shows: 56
- Supporting act: Metro Station
- Box office: $67.1 million (Note: US$100.7 million in 2025 dollars.)

Miley Cyrus concert chronology
- Best of Both Worlds Tour (2007–08); Wonder World Tour (2009); Gypsy Heart Tour (2011)

The Wonder World Tour was the second concert tour by American singer Miley Cyrus. The tour was held in support of her second studio album Breakout (2008) and first extended play (EP) The Time of Our Lives (2009). It began in September 2009 and concluded on December 29, visiting cities in the United States and United Kingdom; thus, the Wonder World Tour became Cyrus' first world tour. It also became Cyrus' first tour not to incorporate performances as Hannah Montana, although "Let's Get Crazy" and "Spotlight", both songs credited to Montana, were performed. Alternative band Metro Station served as opening act for all tour venues. It was sponsored by Wal-Mart and promoted by AEG Live. All tickets from the Wonder World Tour were sold using paperless ticketing, in order to prevent ticket scalping similar to what had occurred during Cyrus' previous tour. One dollar from each ticket sold was donated to the City of Hope National Medical Center, an organization devoted to the fight against cancer.

The Wonder World Tour has been described as part of Cyrus' transitional period, with more elaborate and edgier characteristics. Each concert was divided into seven segments, each of which bared different themes, the subject of matter for the tour's title. The show opened with Cyrus performing rock-oriented songs. It also featured her and backup dancers being suspended above the stage with aerial rigging various times. At one point, she mounted a Harley-Davidson motorcycle as it was elevated and made its path across the venue. Cyrus also rendered a tribute to the deceased singer Michael Jackson and performed two Hannah Montana-credited songs as herself.

The tour received positive to mixed reception from critics. Some praised it and deemed it a spectacle, while others believed it lacked profundity and portrayal of Cyrus' personality. The Wonder World Tour was commercially successful. It was able to sell-out all European dates in ten minutes and marks the largest attendance at The O_{2} Arena in London. During the first leg of the tour, one bus overturned several times on a highway. The accident resulted in the injury of one person and the death of another. The cause of the accident is yet to be specified, yet multiple theories for it exist. A filtered version of the Wonder World Tour was broadcast on the American Broadcasting Company (ABC) on June 18, 2010 and received a total of over 2.6 million viewers. The full-length concert film was released on the limited, deluxe edition of Cyrus' third studio album Can't Be Tamed (2010).

== Background ==
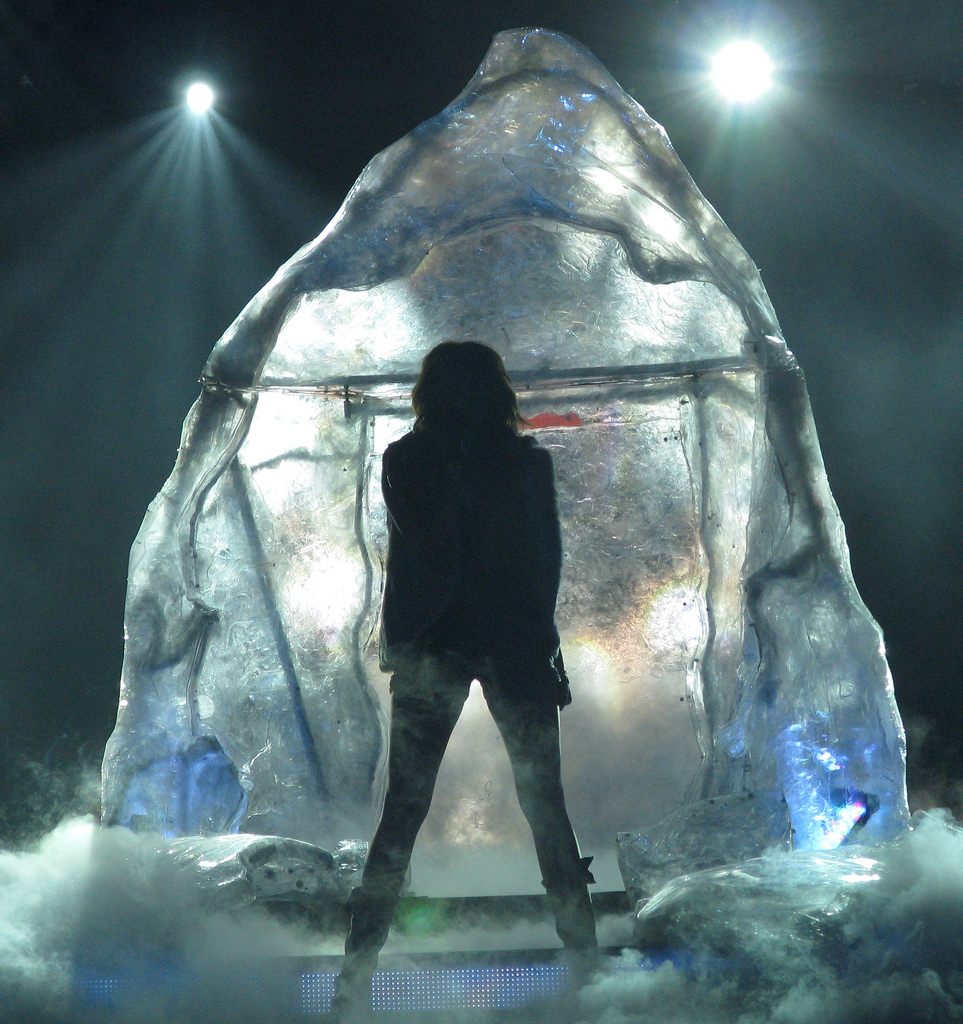
Cyrus performing the concert tour's opening number, "Breakout".

Cyrus is a singer-songwriter and actress who starred on the Disney Channel television series Hannah Montana as Miley Stewart, a girl with a secret double life as the popstar Hannah Montana. Through the television series, Cyrus developed fame as a teen idol and released music credited to Hannah Montana. Cyrus' debut studio album, titled Meet Miley Cyrus, was released as the second disc of the Hannah Montana 2: Meet Miley Cyrus (2007) double-disc album. In order to promote the album, Cyrus embarked on her debut tour, the Best of Both Worlds Tour (2007–08), a North American tour where she performed both under character, as Hannah Montana, and as herself. With the release of Cyrus' second studio album, Breakout (2008), her first not be affiliated with the Hannah Montana franchise, and an extended play (EP) The Time of Our Lives (2009), Cyrus decided to embark on tour again with the Wonder World Tour, however, without incorporating performances as Hannah Montana, a step which the media interpreted as furthering her distance from the Hannah Montana franchise.

The concert tour was announced alongside Cyrus' joint apparel line with Max Azria on June 3, 2009, through various outlets, including Miley's Twitter account, a press release, and MileyWorld, Cyrus' official fan club. It was confirmed that the tour would be sponsored by American retailing company Wal-Mart and promoted by AEG Live. It would expand throughout the United States, from September 14, 2009 in Portland, Oregon to December 2, 2009 in Miami, Florida, with a total of forty-five dates. Alternative rock band Metro Station, where Cyrus' older brother, Trace Cyrus, integrates in, was confirmed as the opening act for all dates. Two days later, a European leg, with nine dates in the United Kingdom, was announced, marking Cyrus' first concerts to visit another continent. On June 16, 2009, two more dates were annexed, and one final date was annexed in October 2009, in order to meet demand.

All tickets for the Wonder World Tour were sold exclusively through paperless ticket delivery, meaning that fans did not receive a physical concert ticket for their entry into the event. Ticket buyers were required to bring the credit card used to make the purchase and photo identification to the concert venue in order to gain entry. All groups were to enter the concert together, and ushers issued seat locator slips. The method of ticket sales was relatively new at the time, although Ticketmaster first experimented it with AC/DC's Black Ice World Tour (2008–10). However, it marked the first time for an arena tour to sell all tickets through paperless ticketing. This was done in response to the extensive ticket scalping that occurred during the Best of Both Worlds Tour and in order to give fans the opportunity to purchase good tickets at face value. Cyrus' manager and president of Morey Management Group, Jason Morey, stated, "The focus was, 'How do we take all the information we gathered last time out and do a better job of it?' It was important to us to address the issue of demand. We thought that of every single option that was available out there, this was a really viable option, to go with the paperless ticketing." As with the Best of Both Worlds Tour, one dollar from each ticket purchased was donated to the City of Hope National Medical Center, a center dedicated to the prevention, treatment and research for the cure of cancer.

== Development ==
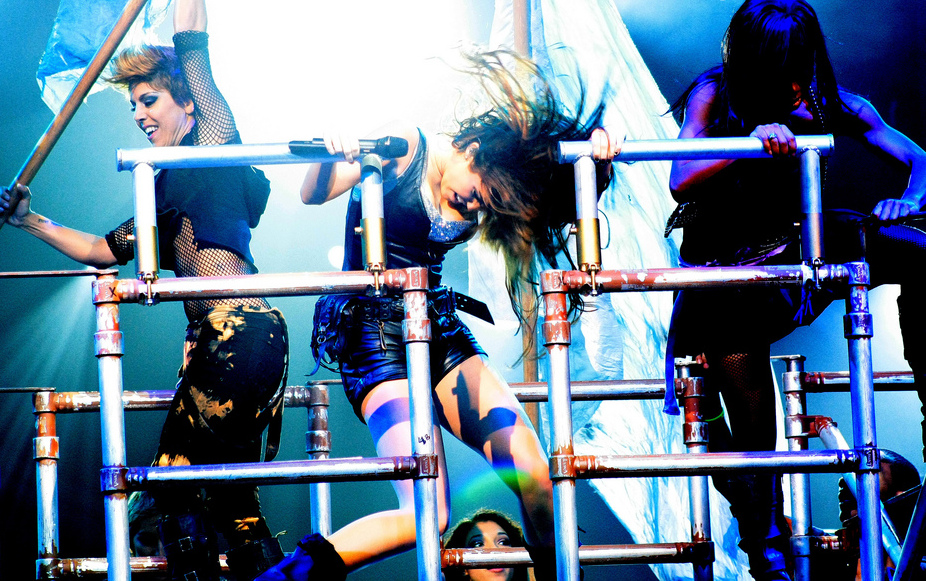
Cyrus performing "Start All Over" on the Wonder World Tour

The tour was titled the Wonder World Tour because of its diversity in themes and styles. Cyrus believed the tour was good transition for solidifying a more rock music-based career. She described the tour to be edgy and "more of a mature show", with the target audience being teenagers relatively her age, which was sixteen at the time. However, performances that would please younger audiences were added to the setlist. It was conceptualized to be a more elaborate than Cyrus' previous tour and to reflect Cyrus as an individual. The reason for this to occur was because Cyrus felt more confident as a vocalist to perform stunts and use props while singing. Also, more resources were available, for more companies were willing to invest in the tour. Ideas were suggested by different individuals and were tested during filmed rehearsals in order to decide which would make the final cut. "Each person has their own character and their own story. So, we've added everyone's kind of specialty into our show [...] This is not just a concert, it is an absolute show", Cyrus said. After having completed filming for The Last Song (2010) in Tybee Island, Georgia, Cyrus returned to Los Angeles for tour rehearsals at The Forum in mid-August. Due to filming The Last Song, Cyrus was only able to rehearse for three weeks although the average rehearsal period for musicians is about three months.

Jamal Sims was hired as the tour's director and main choreographer. Octavious Terry served as an assistant for directing, meanwhile Dondraico Johnson assisted choreography. They, along with twelve other members, composed the tour's creative team. In total, the Wonder World Tour included 124 traveling workers, 19 truckloads of equipment, and 15 buses. The stage was quite different from that of the Best of Both Worlds Tour. It consisted of a rectangular main stage, which featured staircases that elevated the center of the stage, and a narrow runway, which connected the main stage to a B-stage that ran the length of the main stage. Regarding the stage, Cyrus noted that it was "something not many people get to have. I'm able to move around to each side so there's no one person who feels like they don't have the best seat. Every seat is the best seat." Six LED multi-screen video units were located throughout the stage; the three largest were placed as the upstage wall, while the other three were hung by rigs above the stage. The center unit consisted of three screens that faced outward; two others were hung right and left to the center unit, both were double faced toward the center of the venue at a 45° angle, while the backside faced the upper-seat audience. The structure of the video panels was designed by Sims to ensure that all seats within the 270° angle at each venue received an equal view of the video screens. Video content and lighting were designed by Seán Burke; the latter was provided by Production Resource Group (PRG).

The tour used seven individual rigs for performers and props to become airborne. For dancers to be flown to the center of each upstage, a winch, which dropped 18 inches off the face of the panel, was placed in the rig. Cyrus' flying required two winches, one for a vertical lift and one for a horizontal move that coursed the audience and back to the stage. Four elevators, or trap doors, were located throughout the stage, some of which had the option of a 4×4 or an 8×8 foot opening. All of the fly rigs and elevators were built and operated by Show Group Production Services (SGPS)/Showrig. The challenge that presented the most difficulty for SGPS was time constraint, as there were only three weeks of rehearsal. Brian White, co-owner of SGPS, explained,

There wasn’t a lot of time, but the good news was that it was at the [L.A.] Forum, which gave us a lot of height to fly things around, and there was also a lot of room to lay stuff out on the floor. The other good thing was that our offices are only 10 minutes away. So if I had to send a welder down there to make some changes I could do it pretty fast. The biggest thing we had going for us was a great crew. We had some really good people out there." [...] I’d say that about 90 percent of what we built on Miley Cyrus fit the first time in rehearsal. The only reason we had to retro fit anything was because of last minute design changes that came about once everything was up and they could see it all.

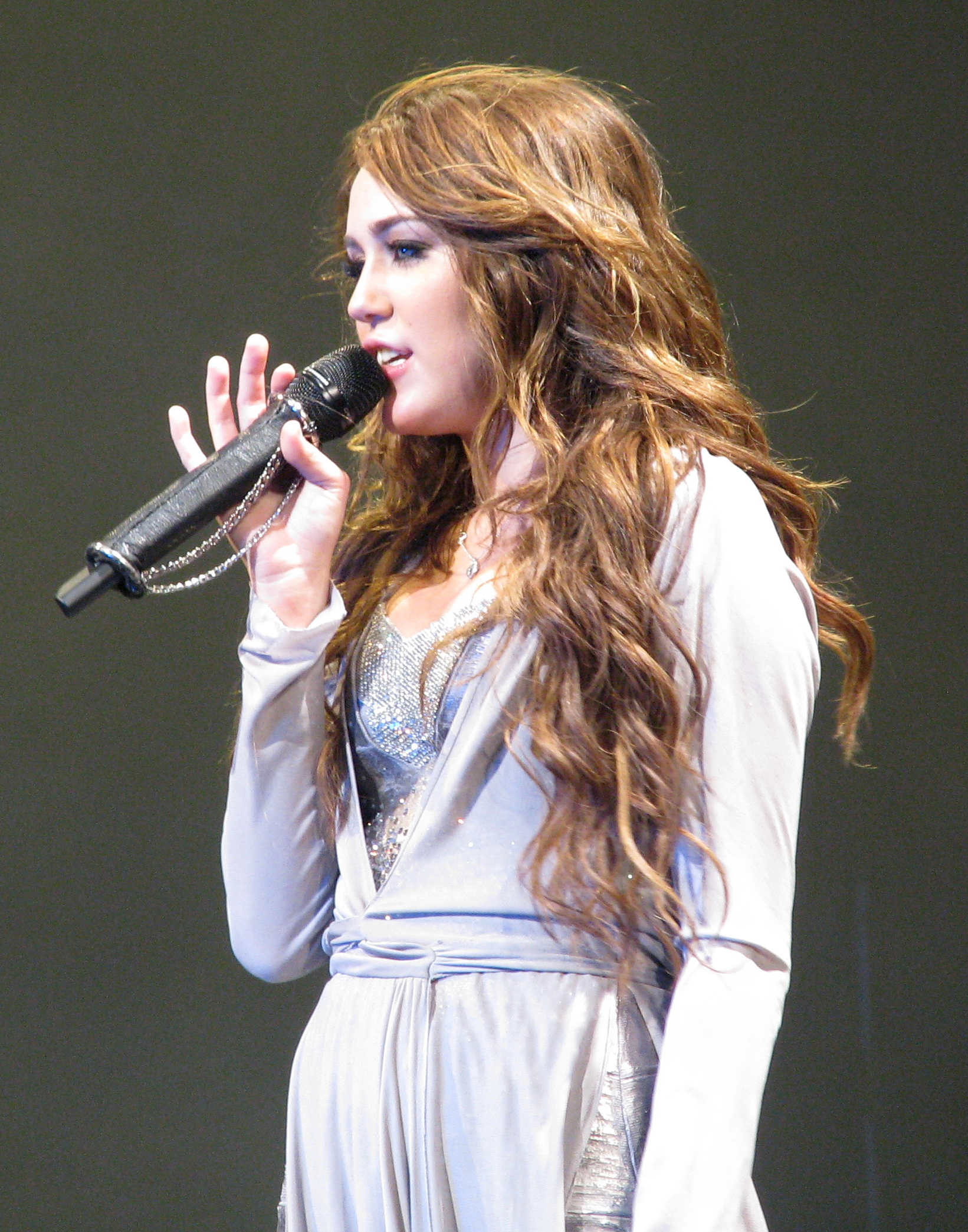
Cyrus performing "Bottom of the Ocean" on the concert tour

Special effects and pyrotechnics were provided by Pyritz Pyrotechnics Group. Terry Ritz, founder of the organization, and his partner Steve Aleff had created various ideas based on the tour soundtrack that was provided to them by the Wonder World Tour's personnel. They met with the tour's choreographer, band manager, and lighting designer, asking them to bring their "hopes, wishes, and dreams." Out of these meetings, the show was completed and a lighting crew, who monitored the stage with a four-camera monitor system when cues were executed, was selected. The pyrotechnics for the show were described as more elegant and subtle, being composed of pink flames with accentuation of silver and white glitter. Because of the extensive automation executed throughout the concert, two personnel were in charge of running it. Neville Emerton ran the automation from under the stage, and Sean Conner ran all of the flying moves from a position at the front of each venue. Meanwhile, assistant stage manager Seth Posner called cues for each concert. "Normally, in a rock show you don’t need someone calling the show. In this one we had to take a more theatrical approach with someone calling cues every step of the way because there was so much going on at once between props and automation", explained production manager Omar Abderrahman. One of the props that required much attention on the part of Posner was a car made to resemble a tractor, designed and built by effects designer and stage manager Scott "Stryker" Christensen. Because it came along late in the design process, the main elevator was not built to handle the weight of the car, though it was eventually reinforced to support the weight and movement of the car. The car was also modified; it was made electric, instead of using a combustion engine, for fire-safety and changed to turn around by adjusting its turning radius to automate steering with all four wheels. In order to translate the concert tour overseas to the United Kingdom, the Wonder World Tour paired with Sound Moves, a company that was already providing minor support for the North American leg of the tour.

== Concert synopsis ==
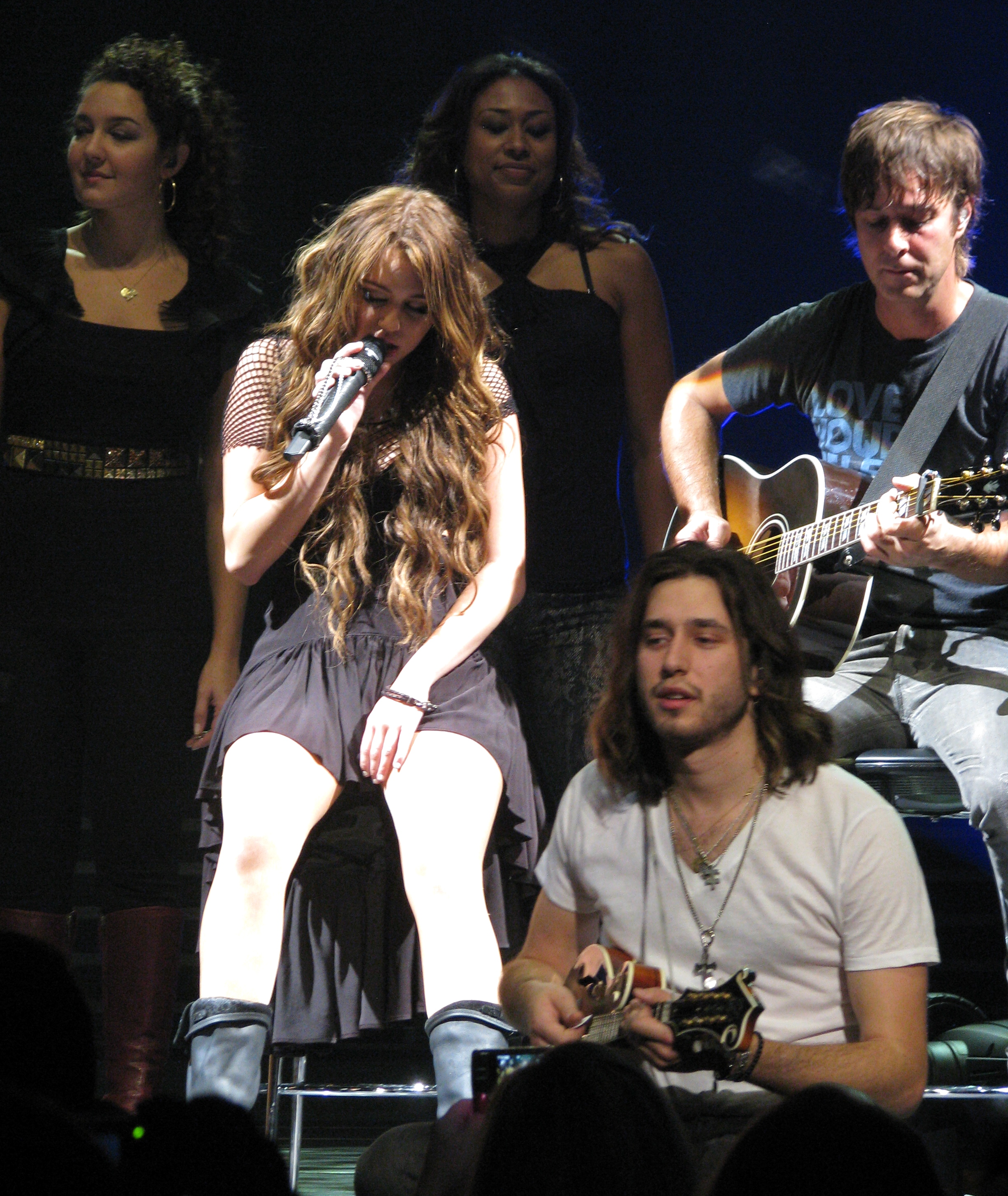
Cyrus performing "These Four Walls" during the Wonder World Tour

The main show commenced with Cyrus emerging from the bottom of the stage inside a large, crystal-like glacier. She wore a black leather hot pantsuit, a tank top, and a white fur vest with a silver sequined hood as she escaped the cocoon to perform the concert's opening number, "Breakout". Numerous backup dancers accompanied her and, towards the conclusion, she performed atop movable scaffolding. After removing the fur vest, Cyrus performed "Start All Over" atop the scaffolding and continued the remainder of the first segment of the show with "7 Things" and "Kicking and Screaming". Cyrus then executed the show's second segment with a performance of "Bottom of the Ocean", which featured an aquatic theme for the stage and Cyrus donning a silver, flowing evening gown that bared a bejeweled bodysuit underneath. The performance ended with Cyrus diving into the stage, succeeded by a simulation of her underwater on the video screens. Cyrus returned to the stage for the show's third segment atop a tractor-resembling car to perform "Fly on the Wall". During the performance, Cyrus wore an extravagant white dress with a feathered skirt. Backup dancers were flown up into contact with panels in order to resemble a fly on a window; meanwhile, Cyrus was flown across the arena. Once back in the stage, Cyrus and backup dancers performed a brief dance interlude of Michael Jackson's "Thriller" (1984). Replacing the feathered bottom with a tutu, Cyrus performed the Hannah Montana-credited song "Let's Get Crazy" and "Hoedown Throwdown". The latter was followed by a video in which will.i.am of The Black Eyed Peas spoke about Cyrus, as she left the stage. When the video was completed, the dancers performed a remix of the Black Eyed Peas' "Boom Boom Pow" (2009).

The show's fourth segment opened with "These Four Walls", in which Cyrus wore a black high-low dress. The song was performed in B-stage with various acoustic musicians. The show proceeded with "When I Look at You", a performance that featured the trailer for Cyrus' film The Last Song (2010) and her performing with a grand piano. It concluded with "Obsessed", which the singer performed atop a simple suspension bridge. She re-entered the stage, clothed by a black tee, red cheetah-patterned hot pants, and black boots, to perform the second Hannah Montana-credited song "Spotlight" and, later, "G.N.O. (Girl's Night Out)", replacing the prior hot pants with black ones and adding a denim vest. She followed with a cover of Arrows' "I Love Rock 'n' Roll", where Cyrus mounted a red Harley-Davidson Dyna Fat Bob FXDF 2010 that was suspended above the stage and traveled in a semi-oval path across the venue. Performances of "Party in the U.S.A.", which made use of a luggage cart, and "Hovering", which featured Cyrus' older brother Trace Cyrus, rounded off the segment. The sixth segment of the show featured Cyrus performing "Simple Song", in which she dressed in a long, white shirt and a black tuxedo, in order to simulate a music conductor. Midway through the performance, Cyrus stepped onto an elevator that rose eight feet from the stage. She exited the stage and returned for the final section. During the encore, Cyrus dressed in a white tank top and shorts, boots, and a metallic vest to perform "See You Again", later removing the vest to conclude the concert with "The Climb". Immediately after finishing, she exited through a passageway in the stage as fireworks were fired above.

== Critical reception ==
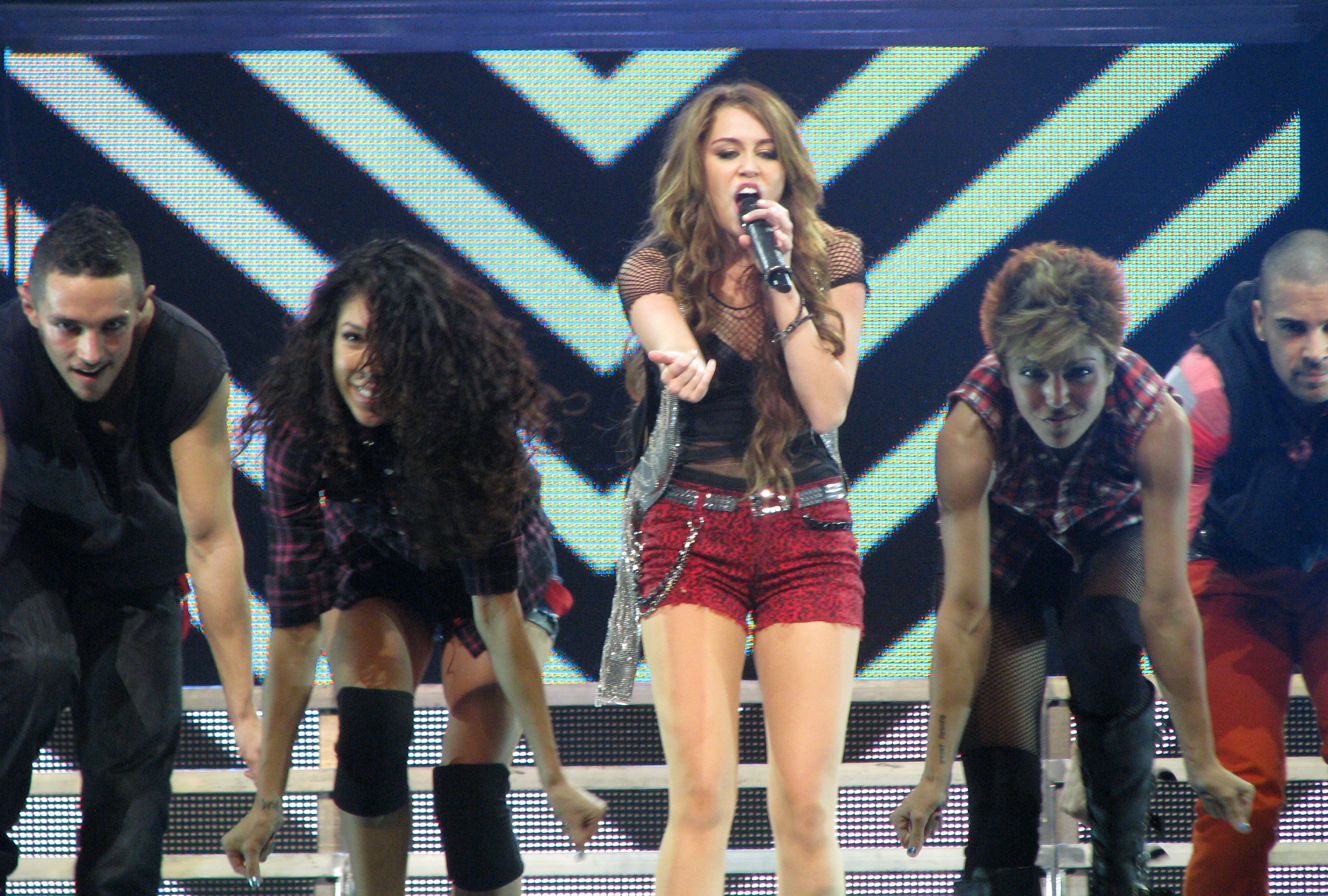
Cyrus performing "Spotlight" on the Wonder World Tour

Mikael Wood of The Los Angeles Times, in reference to Hannah Montana, commented, "Once again, make-believe Miley was more compelling than the real thing." Wood believed Cyrus possessed charisma, commenting that she portrayed superstar authority, but failed because she was unable or unwilling to "give her fans a deeper idea of who she is and what her music means. For all its eye-popping detail, the concert offered nothing that viewers of her TV show or buyers of her records don't already know about her." Dave Paulson of The Tennessean stated, "Cyrus' spectacle sets her apart from nearly every other A-list act touring today. She's not a renowned vocalist by any stretch, but her show's choreography barely provides a moment for her to catch her breath, and she's still able to deliver." Michael Hann of the United Kingdom-based Guardian was impressed by the concert, praising the setlist and deeming it enjoyable for both children and adults. He continued, "Good as the best songs are, though, they take a backseat to the staging [...] The one misstep is when a trailer for her next movie is shown during a costume change. It's a tacky moment and doesn't reflect the attention to detail that makes the rest of it a laugh-out-loud delight." Lael Loewenstein of Variety magazine said, "Cyrus knows how to deliver the goods without losing her core audience." Loewenstein deemed the concert a mission accomplished because of inevitable hits and Cyrus' charisma, drive, spunk, and a merely-limited vocal range. Erik Ensrst of The Milwaukee Journal Sentinel praised the show, stating that it was "a pure visual spectacle", but commented that producers forgot a place for Cyrus' personality.

Jim Harrington of The Oakland Tribune described the show as a human embodiment of Britney Spears' "I'm Not a Girl, Not Yet a Woman" (2002). He presumed that the tour was a conscious transition for fans who did not want Cyrus to separate herself from the Hannah Montana franchise. Kirsty Cameron of The Daily Telegraph wrote, "Despite her relatively young age, Cyrus showed her unfailing capability as performer. With the help of her back-up dancers, Cyrus provided her audience with choreographed set pieces and a different spectacle for each song." James Reed of The Boston Globe noted that the Wonder World Tour presented Cyrus as both a "PG-rated tween pop star and an edgy rocker eager". He stated that although she played both roles well, it was apparent that she was more at ease with the latter. Reed also felt the concert did little to display Cyrus' personality and ability to engage with the audience. "We know she's got impressive vocal chops, but now we need to feel what she's trying to put across in her songs, something beyond the standard 'You guys are awesome!' banter." Scott Iwasaki of Deseret News reviewed a concert in which Cyrus was ill. He mentioned that because of her illness, her voice went flat. Iwasaki also expressed his viewpoint that "if there [were] any worries that Miley Cyrus would become another Britney Spears train wreck, those worries were quelled during Tuesday night's show. She kept the show family-friendly and, although obviously sick, looked like she had a good time." Marlin Levison of The Star Tribune believed the concert lacked much profundity until the last performance.

== Commercial performance ==
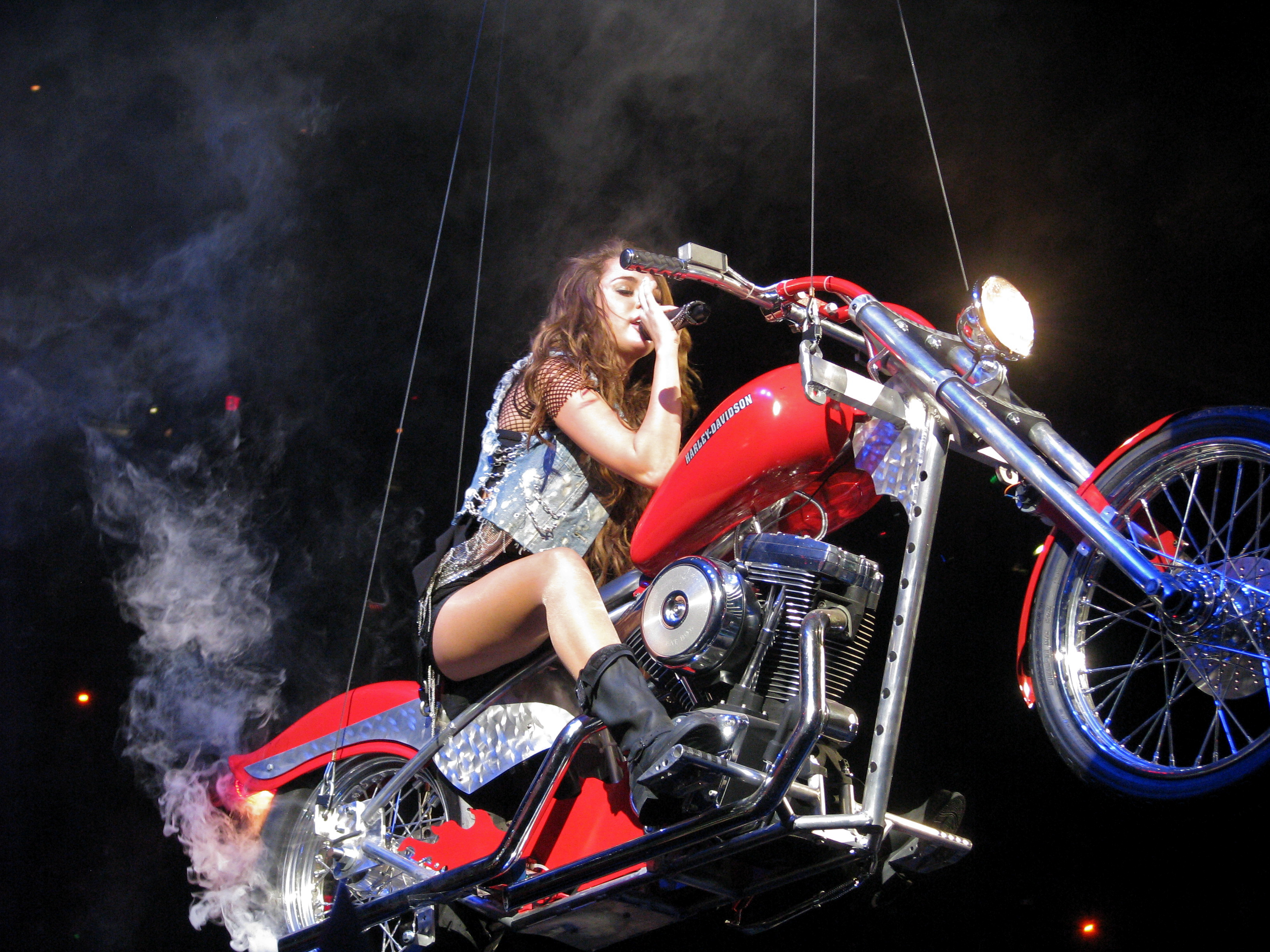
Cyrus performing a cover of Arrows' "I Love Rock 'n' Roll" on the Wonder World Tour

The Wonder World Tour was commercially successful and represented stability in the touring industry, despite the 2008 financial crisis. In North America, the tour sold out twenty-nine out of forty-five concert dates and grossed over US $45.2 million. The tour was able to remain as one of the hottest tours in the United States during its expansion. The Wonder World Tour's entire, ten-date European leg sold out in only ten minutes. In order to meet demand, an eleventh date was added and scheduled for December 29, 2009. In December 2009, the tour ranked atop Billboard's Hot Tours, based on the tour's European performances. For the month, box office grossed US $21.9 million for eleven shows in four markets. The five concerts held at The O_{2} Arena in London produced ticket sales that topped $11 million (£6.8 million). On December 19, 2009, with an audience of 16,196, Cyrus broke the record for the largest attendance at The O_{2} Arena; a record that surpassed the previously tied records by Beyoncé's I Am... World Tour (2009–10), Bon Jovi's Lost Highway Tour (2007–08), and Coldplay's Viva la Vida Tour (2008–10). In total, the tour grossed over $67.1 million, $15 million which were earned by Cyrus.

== Bus accident ==
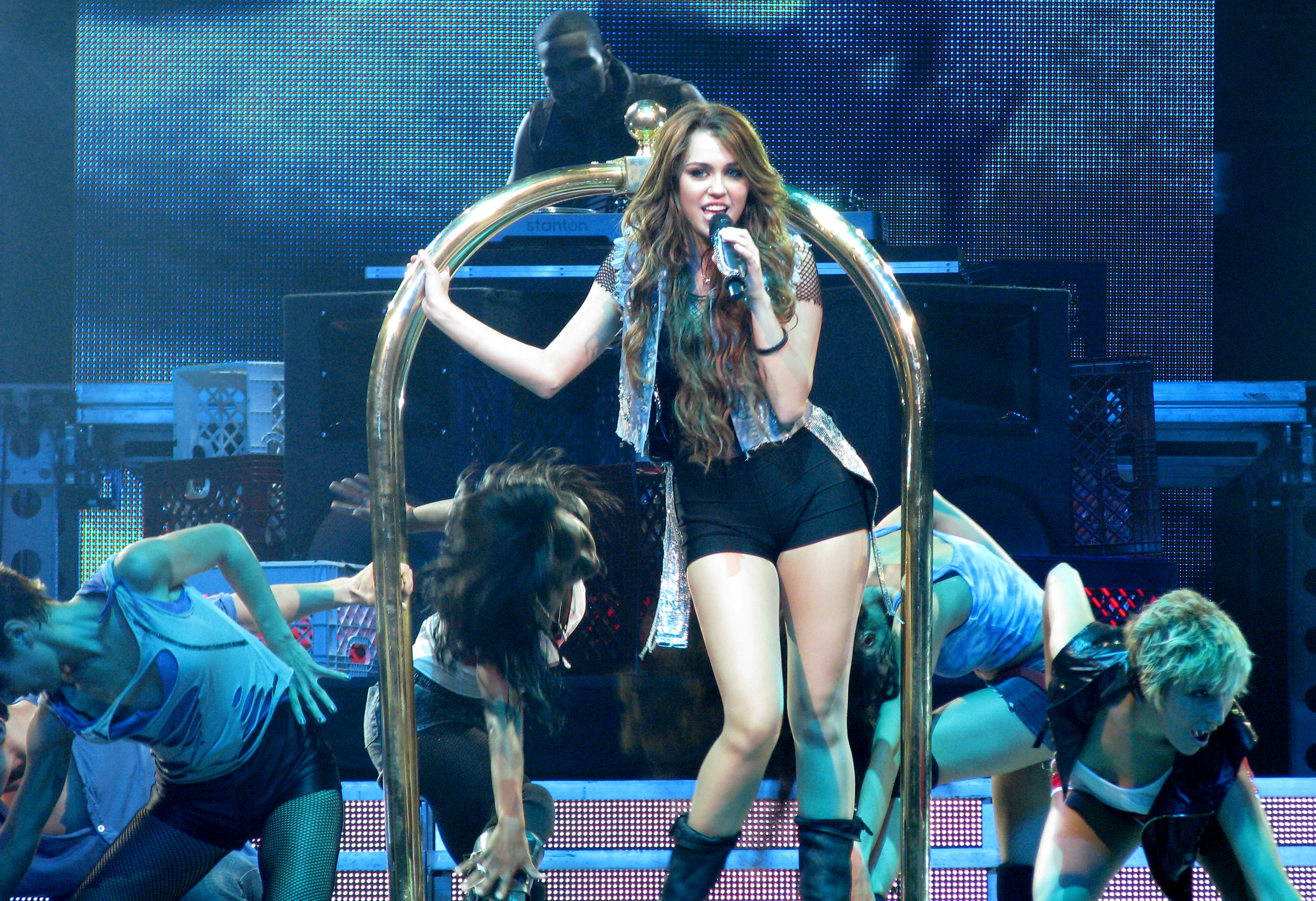
Cyrus performing "Party in the U.S.A." during the Wonder World Tour

On November 20, 2009, in its attempt to arrive at the destination of Greensboro, North Carolina, one of the buses for the Wonder World Tour overturned on a Virginian highway. The accident occurred around 8:15 A.M. in Dinwiddie County, about 40 miles south of Richmond, Virginia. The bus ran off the left side of Interstate 85, struck an embankment, rolled onto its right side. An eye witness of the accident explained that the bus appeared to have drifted off the road for a fairly long stretch before tipping over. The bus had nine passengers aboard, including members of the lighting crew, though Cyrus was not on board during the incident. Most of the passengers on the bus suffered only minor injuries and escaped the crashed bus through the broken front windshield. One person, Assistant Stage Manager Martin Zilio, required medical attention and was hospitalized overnight. Zilio recovered from his injuries and was later able to return to work on the tour. One person, bus driver Bill "Uncle Bill" Douglas, a 53-year-old of Austin, Texas, died at the scene of the accident.

In response to the accident, the Cyrus family released a statement via Cyrus' official website; it stated, "We are deeply saddened by the loss of Bill 'Uncle Bill' Douglas. Members of our tour are like members of our family. Our thoughts and prayers go out to his family in the midst of this tragedy. He will truly be missed." Omar Abderrahman, the tour's production manager, said, "That was real tough. It's always a tragedy to lose anyone. Uncle Bill was a great driver and a good friend. He’d done a lot of tours with me, and we’re all going to miss him." Although the cause for the accident remains undefined, authorities confirmed the roads were wet from overnight rain. However, CBS News reported that speed and weather were not attributed as factors for the accident's occurrence. Despite the incident, the tour's following concert on November 22, 2009 at the Greensboro Coliseum in Greensboro, North Carolina proceeded as scheduled. During the concert, Cyrus dedicated the performance of "The Climb" to Douglas as overhead screens displayed a video commemorating him.

== ABC television special ==
Miley Cyrus: Live from London

Video by Miley Cyrus
- Released: June 18, 2010
- Recorded: December 13–29, 2009 (The O2 Arena, United Kingdom)
- Length: 120 minutes
- Label: Hollywood
- Director: Russell Thomas

Miley Cyrus chronology
Miley Cyrus: Live from London (2010)	Bangerz Tour (2015)

The concerts held on December 13, 14, 19, 20 and 29, 2009 at The O2 Arena in London were filmed and broadcast as an hour-long television special entitled Miley Cyrus: Live from London on June 18, 2010, in American Broadcasting Company. The project was executively produced by Leticia "Tish" Cyrus, Cyrus' mother, and Jason Morey, Cyrus' manager. It was directed by Russell Thomas and produced by Jim Parsons. Miley Cyrus: Live from London was described by Cyrus' official website with the following statement: "The program captures how Miley, who has grown up in the public eye, has grown as an artist and reveals her natural progression and sophistication." The concert special was watched by over 2.6 million viewers in the United States.

Miley Cyrus: Live from London's airing on ABC was a filtered version of the full-length concert, which became available on the limited, deluxe edition of Can't Be Tamed, released on June 18, 2010. The deluxe edition featured the audio CD, containing the album's music, and a DVD, which contains nineteen live performances and behind-the-scenes footage with Cyrus. "We anticipate an overindexing, if you will, of those who buy the CD/DVD over just the music because it's never been seen before", stated Abbey Konowitch, general manager of Hollywood Records.

=== Track listing ===
DVD
No.	Title	Length
1.	"Hello London / Wanna Hear My Fingers Crack?"
2.	"Breakout"
3.	"Start All Over"
4.	"7 Things"
5.	"Kicking and Screaming"
6.	"It's More About the Music Here"
7.	"Bottom of the Ocean"
8.	"You Have to Buy It"
9.	"Fly on the Wall"
10.	"Let's Get Crazy"
11.	"Hoedown Throwdown"
12.	"Not Sure if the Queen Jams Out"
13.	"These Four Walls"
14.	"I Don't Do Hats"
15.	"When I Look at You"
16.	"Obsessed"
17.	"The Show Can't Go On / Back Stage at the O2"
18.	"Spotlight"
19.	"G.N.O. (Girl's Night Out)"
20.	"I Love Rock 'n' Roll"
21.	"Party in the U.S.A."
22.	"Hovering" (featuring Trace Cyrus)
23.	"This Is How We Roll"
24.	"Simple Song"
25.	"See You Again"
26.	"The Climb"
27.	"End Credits"

== Set list ==
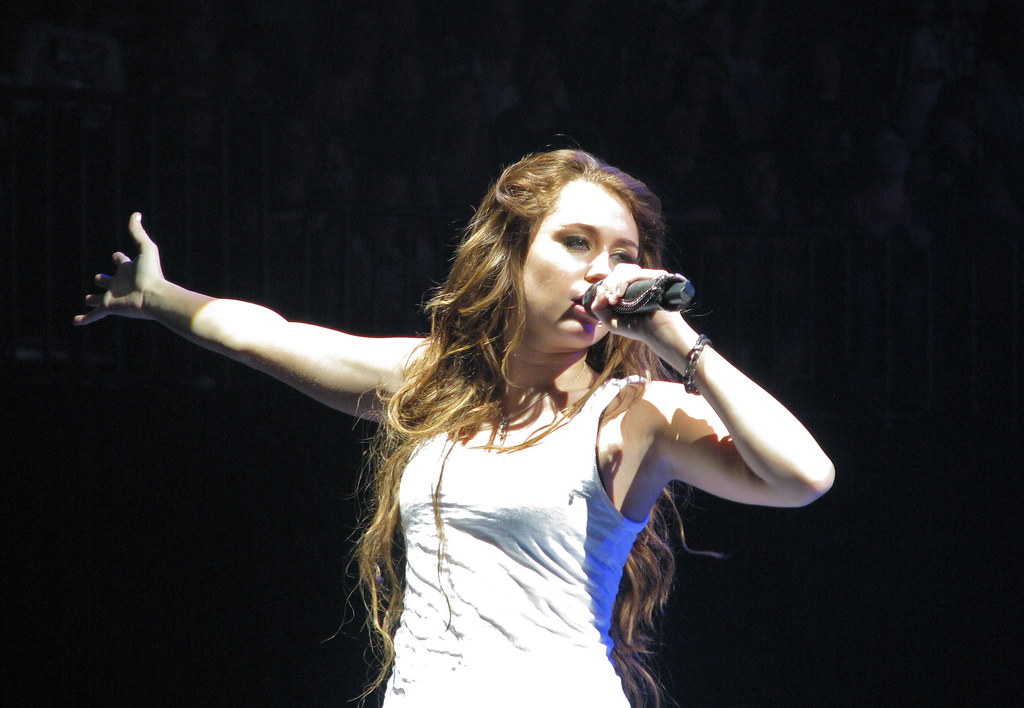
Cyrus performing the final song, "The Climb", on the Wonder World Tour

1. "Breakout"
2. "Start All Over"
3. "7 Things"
4. "Kicking and Screaming"
5. "Bottom of the Ocean"
6. "Fly on the Wall"
7. "Let's Get Crazy"
8. "Hoedown Throwdown"
9. "These Four Walls"
10. "When I Look at You"
11. "Obsessed"
12. "Spotlight"
13. "G.N.O. (Girl's Night Out)"
14. "I Love Rock 'n' Roll" (Joan Jett cover)
15. "Party in the U.S.A."
16. "Wake Up America"
17. "Simple Song"

Encore

18. "See You Again"
19. "The Climb"

Notes

- During the performance of "7 Things" in Salt Lake City, Cyrus ran off the stage because of illness from strep throat and the necessity of medical attention. Her band and back up singers covered for her, and, fifteen minutes later, Cyrus returned to resume the concert. "Kicking and Screaming" and "Wake Up America" were both omitted from the set list to make up for the loss of time.
- Starting with the performance in Milwaukee, "Hovering" replaced "Wake Up America".

== Shows ==
Date (2009)	City	Country	Venue	Opening act	Attendance	Revenue
North America
September 14	Portland	United States	Rose Garden Arena	Metro Station	10,917 / 11,787	$728,328
September 16	Tacoma	United States	Tacoma Dome	Metro Station	15,242 / 15,920	$1,033,221
September 18	Oakland	United States	Oracle Arena	Metro Station	13,881 / 14,480	$901,747
September 20	San Jose	United States	HP Pavilion	Metro Station	13,100 / 13,918	$835,071
September 22	Los Angeles	United States	Staples Center	Metro Station	14,584 / 14,584	$1,055,388
September 23	Anaheim	United States	Honda Center	Metro Station	12,638 / 12,638	$956,981
September 25	Glendale	United States	Jobing.com Arena	Metro Station	13,755 / 13,755	$993,003
September 26	Las Vegas	United States	Thomas & Mack Center	Metro Station	11,426 / 12,512	$718,706
September 29	Salt Lake City	United States	EnergySolutions Arena	Metro Station	10,885 / 12,525	$718,727
October 6	Auburn Hills	United States	The Palace of Auburn Hills	Metro Station	16,142 / 16,142	$1,090,009
October 7	Columbus	United States	Nationwide Arena	Metro Station	14,191 / 15,135	$972,592
October 9	Des Moines	United States	Wells Fargo Arena	Metro Station	14,174 / 14,174	$1,005,453
October 10	Milwaukee	United States	Bradley Center	Metro Station	15,335 / 15,335	$1,043,433
October 12	Tulsa	United States	BOK Center	Metro Station	13,151 / 14,063	$937,265
October 13 (Note: The October 2, 2009 concert at the Qwest Center in Omaha, Nebraska was rescheduled to October 13, 2009 because of Cyrus' illness from strep throat.)	Omaha	United States	Qwest Center Omaha	Metro Station	13,249 / 15,092	$928,176
October 15	San Antonio	United States	AT&T Center	Metro Station	15,523 / 15,523	$1,059,159
October 17 (Note: The October 3, 2009 concert at the Sprint Center in Kansas City was rescheduled to October 17, 2009 because of Cyrus' illness from strep throat.)	Kansas City	United States	Sprint Center	Metro Station	15,525 / 15,525	$1,111,178
October 18	Dallas	United States	American Airlines Center	Metro Station	15,102 / 15,102	$1,039,489
October 20	New Orleans	United States	New Orleans Arena	Metro Station	15,359 / 15,359	$1,029,841
October 21	Memphis	United States	FedExForum	Metro Station	12,256 / 13,010	$864,662
October 23	Birmingham	United States	BJCC Arena	Metro Station	14,527 / 14,527	$1,012,737
October 24	North Little Rock	United States	Verizon Arena	Metro Station	14,119 / 15,325	$969,281
October 27	Chicago	United States	United Center	Metro Station	16,600 / 16,600	$1,148,500
October 28 (Note: The October 4, 2009 concert at the Scottrade Center in St. Louis, Missouri was rescheduled to October 28, 2009 because of Cyrus' illness from strep throat.)	St. Louis	United States	Scottrade Center	Metro Station	13,982 / 15,205	$982,909
October 29	Minneapolis	United States	Target Center	Metro Station	18,219 / 19,752	$1,022,257
October 31	Louisville	United States	Freedom Hall	Metro Station	13,526 / 16,062	$851,635
November 1	Lexington	United States	Rupp Arena	Metro Station	15,774 / 18,210	$976,313
November 3	Washington, D.C.	United States	Verizon Center	Metro Station	15,846 / 15,846	$1,071,917
November 4	Philadelphia	United States	Wachovia Center	Metro Station	17,153 / 17,153	$1,209,364
November 5	University Park	United States	Bryce Jordan Center	Metro Station	12,901 / 12,901	$932,270
November 7	Newark	United States	Prudential Center	Metro Station	30,416 / 30,416	$2,090,972
November 8	Newark	United States	Prudential Center	Metro Station	30,416 / 30,416	$2,090,972
November 9	Boston	United States	TD Garden	Metro Station	14,981 / 14,981	$1,111,590
November 12	Hartford	United States	XL Center	Metro Station	13,824 / 13,824	$1,000,448
November 15	Cleveland	United States	Quicken Loans Arena	Metro Station	15,774 / 16,567	$1,072,833
November 16	Indianapolis	United States	Conseco Fieldhouse	Metro Station	14,920 / 14,920	$1,018,200
November 18	Uniondale	United States	Nassau Coliseum	Metro Station	29,277 / 29,277	$2,002,982
November 19	Uniondale	United States	Nassau Coliseum	Metro Station	29,277 / 29,277	$2,002,982
November 22	Greensboro	United States	Greensboro Coliseum	Metro Station	17,597 / 17,597	$1,182,082
November 24	Charlotte	United States	Time Warner Cable Arena	Metro Station	15,553 / 15,553	$1,048,004
November 25	Nashville	United States	Sommet Center	Metro Station	14,692 / 14,692	$1,040,794
November 28	Columbia	United States	Colonial Life Arena	Metro Station	14,557 / 14,557	$1,018,682
November 29	Atlanta	United States	Philips Arena	Metro Station	15,000 / 15,000	$1,041,720
December 1	Tampa	United States	St. Pete Times Forum	Metro Station	14,730 / 14,730	$1,035,875
December 2	Miami	United States	American Airlines Arena	Metro Station	15,819 / 15,819	$1,098,931
Europe
December 13	London	England	The O_{2} Arena	Metro Station	80,679 / 80,679 (Note: The score data is representative of the five shows at the O2 Arena on December 13, 14, 19, 20, and 29 respectively.)	$11,081,900
December 14	London	England	The O_{2} Arena	Metro Station	80,679 / 80,679	$11,081,900
December 16	Dublin	Ireland	The O_{2}	Metro Station	17,495 / 17,495	$3,134,370
December 17	Dublin	Ireland	The O_{2}	Metro Station	17,495 / 17,495	$3,134,370
December 19	London	England	The O_{2} Arena	Metro Station		
December 20	London	England	The O_{2} Arena	Metro Station		
December 22	Birmingham	England	National Indoor Arena	Metro Station	25,635 / 25,635	$3,494,140
December 23	Birmingham	England	National Indoor Arena	Metro Station	25,635 / 25,635	$3,494,140
December 27	Manchester	England	Manchester Evening News Arena	Metro Station	32,926 / 32,926	$4,268,120
December 28	Manchester	England	Manchester Evening News Arena	Metro Station	32,926 / 32,926	$4,268,120
December 29	London	England	The O_{2} Arena	Metro Station		
TOTAL					812,957 / 832,828 (97.61%)	$66,941,255

== Personnel ==
Creative team

- Director, choreographer – Jamal Sims
- Assistant director – Octavious Terry
- Assistant choreographer – Dondraico Johnson
- Assistant – Christopher Scott
- Creative consultant – Jeffery Hornaday
- Production designer (lighting, video, stage) – Seán Burke
- Wardrobe designer – Simone Harouche
- Screens content director – Richard Turner
- Screen content producer – Justine Catterall
- Content creation & direction – Ben Ib, Seán Evans
- Content creation & animation – Colin Walsh
- Scenic consultant – Chris Medvitz
- Effects designer – Scott Christensen
- Flying by foy – Joe Mcgeough
- Sound effects – Clay Janes

Band

- Music direction, drummer – Stacy Jones
- Guitar – Jamie Arentzen, Jaco Caraco
- Keyboards – Mike Schmid
- Bass – Vashon Johnson
- Background vocals – Sara Mann, Carmel Helene

Staff and Crew

- Staff & crew production manager – Omar Abderrahman
- Tour manager – Steve Brumbach
- Stage manager – Scott "Striker" Christensen
- Production designer – Seán Burke
- FOH – Paul Hager
- Monitors – Vish Wadi
- Assistant tour managers – Lauren Abderrahman, Mick Adkins
- Production coordinator – Jon Bumgarner
- Production assistants – Dillan Esco, Lauren Temple
- Stage manager assistant – Seth Posner
- Security – Sal Pietripaoli, Thomas Rosehaley
- Hair stylist – Scott Cunha
- Make up artist – Denika Bedrossian
- Prop master – Chris Malta
- Props assistant – Sage Christensen
- Backline – John Ciasulli, Benoit Brideau
- Dancers – Jennifer Talarico, Christina Glur, Ashlee Nino, Bianca Brewton, Ryan Novak, Mike Dizon, Cory Graves, Christopher "War" Martinez, Nolan Padilla, Jabari Odom
- Pro tools – Clay Janes, Trevor Robinson
- Carpenters – Joe Rogers, Carl Ciasulli, Carl Chadwick, Kyle Hoffman
- Foy tech – Patrick Leonard
- Lighting director – Seán Burke
- Lighting crew chief – Ronald Beal
- Lighting techs – Peter Feher, Thomas Dubas, Robert Simoneaux, Jason Winfree, Allison Triplet
- Pyro techs – Steve Aleff, Brien Capenter, Travis Jameson
- Riggers – Art Mcconnell, Seyton Pooley, Jeremy Benauer, Antar Abderrahman, Craig "Miami" Powell, Martin Zilio
- Showrig – Sean Conner, Neville Emerton, James Ford, Jeremy Bryden, Charles Veal, Terry Parker
- Sound crew chief – Tim Holder
- Sound techs – Adam Stuart, Jeffery Lutgen, Nyle Wood, Dustin Ponscheck
- Video director – Rob Darcy
- Media server programmer & operator – Richard Turner
- Video techs – Bob Boynton, Adam Sion, Bruce Ramos, Redo Jackson, Tommy Kalogiannis, Joe Wolohan
- Wardrobe supervisor – Jill Focke
- Wardrobe – Tiffany Fellar, Zhenni Li-Cagle
- Wal-Mart (sponsor manager) – Paul Douglas
- Wal-Mart representatives – Joseph Cesaretti, Jerry Farantatos, Nicholas Farantatos, Ryan Norris, Andria Goodrow
- Merch (show day team) – Ty Zigler
- Merch assistant (show day team) – Luke Underwood
- Merch (advance team) – Jon Kohl
- Merch assistant (advance team) – Matt Parillo
- Bus drivers – John Fry, Joe Reed, George Hampton, Keith Kaminski, Larry Cyrus, Tracy Morgan, Ronny Knox, Bryan Stevensen, Todd Harrison, Bill Douglas, Matt Selah, Charlie Mcpherson, Grant Whitman, Eric Smith
- Lead truck driver – James Johnston
- Truck drivers – Larry Hockensmith, Bryan Roddy, Jorge Delgado, Jerry Burnett, Joe Harrison, Jon Mcclain, Danny Martin, Tim Faye, Herchel Cook, Toby Williams, Alex Nino, Jimmy Edelen, Phillip Pedigo, Julie Sword, Leo Johnson, Adam Morris, Neil Lilly, Terry Beebe
- Merch truck driver – Robert Pinkey
- Merch advance truck driver – Hans Smith
