= Fly on the Wall (song) =

Single by Miley Cyrus

from the album Breakout
- Released: November 4, 2008
- Studio: Rock Mafia Studios (Santa Monica, CA)
- Genre: Rock
- Length: 2:31
- Label: Hollywood
- Songwriters: Miley Cyrus; Antonina Armato; Tim James; Devrim Karaoglu
- Producers: Antonina Armato; Tim James

Miley Cyrus singles chronology
"7 Things" (2008)	"Fly on the Wall" (2008)	"The Climb" (2009)

Music video
- "Fly on the Wall" on YouTube

"Fly on the Wall" is a song by American singer Miley Cyrus, released by Hollywood Records on November 4, 2008, as the third and final single from her second studio album, Breakout. Written by Cyrus, Devrim Karaoglu and its producers Antonina Armato and Tim James, song's lyrics describe paparazzi and their extensive personal privacy invasions.

The song received acclaim from music critics, with many claiming it defied teen pop expectations and was Breakout's best track. "Fly on the Wall" reached its highest international peak on the UK Singles Chart, at number 16. The single's music video was directed by Philip Andelman and premiered on FNMTV. The "Thriller"-inspired video takes place mainly in a parking garage in which Cyrus encounters and attempts to escape the paparazzi. Cyrus promoted the song through several venues, including a performance on her second headlining tour, the Wonder World Tour, that incorporated a short segment of the "Thriller" dance. Cyrus also performed the song on her Gypsy Heart Tour.

== Background ==
The song's lyrics, written by Cyrus, Antonina Armato, Tim James and Devrim Karaoglu, have been mistakenly interpreted in a variety of ways. The song's protagonist sings in first person perspective while condemning an unspecified subject for wanting to invade her privacy. The majority of reviewers thought the protagonist was referring to a "controlling boyfriend". Ben Ratliff of The New York Times sided with the boyfriend, and believed the song's protagonist was "bullying some poor boy for the sin of wanting to know what she talks about with her friends". Sarah Rodman of The Boston Globe believed the song could have described a number of subjects, such as "a former boyfriend, the media, and even her fans". However, in an interview with Jocelyn Vena of MTV News, Cyrus said the song was about "the media" and "how they think they know everything about [her], when they don't. They want to be a fly on [her] wall and watch [her] 24/7." Cyrus elaborated on the concept in an interview with Nancy O'Dell of Access Hollywood. She stated,

"Paparazzi. I wrote it for the media, always feeling like they need to be in my life. Sometimes they just wish that they could blend in and be there all the time. And that they might know me a little bit better if they were in my house, in my room and my different places. So, it's like going to different spots and trying to get away from them and it's not going away like little annoying flies."

== Composition ==
"Fly on the Wall"
A 14-second sample of "Fly on the Wall", where the chorus is heard. The lyrics are inspired by the privacy invasion of paparazzi.

"Fly on the Wall" is a song with strong uses of electric guitars, keyboards and soprano vocals. Influences derive from electronic music and industrial music. It is set in common time with a moderately fast rock tempo of 144 beats per minute. The song is written in the key of G minor. Cyrus' vocal range spans two octaves from the low note of G_{3} to the high note of D_{5}. The song has the following chord progression, G5—D—Gm7. The song's chorus has the use of a vocal hook; the hook sings, "fly on the wall".

== Critical reception ==
Upon its release, "Fly on the Wall" received critical acclaim. Heather Phares of AllMusic said the song was a "G-rated version" of Britney Spears' song "Toxic" and provided hints of Cyrus' future musical direction. Sarah Rodman of The Boston Globe said "Fly on the Wall" was a change of pace for Cyrus and called it "the album's most interesting tune". Mikael Wood of the Los Angeles Times said the song is a result of regular Walt Disney Company standards, yet "the CD's best cut". Along with "Full Circle", Sal Cinquemani of Slant Magazine said the song was a "more worthy" follow-up to "See You Again". Mordechai Shinefield of The Village Voice stated the song was "blazingly brilliant" and that it was "the best, angriest song [on Breakout]". Johnny Dee of Virgin Media said the song and "7 Things" were "feisty pop belters" that would encourage a long-term career. Ratliff negatively compared "Fly on the Wall" to the Pussycat Dolls and said that although Cyrus' voice is generally rich with a deep range, it became "pinched and stingy" in the single. However, he also said the song was "teen-accurate".

== Chart performance ==
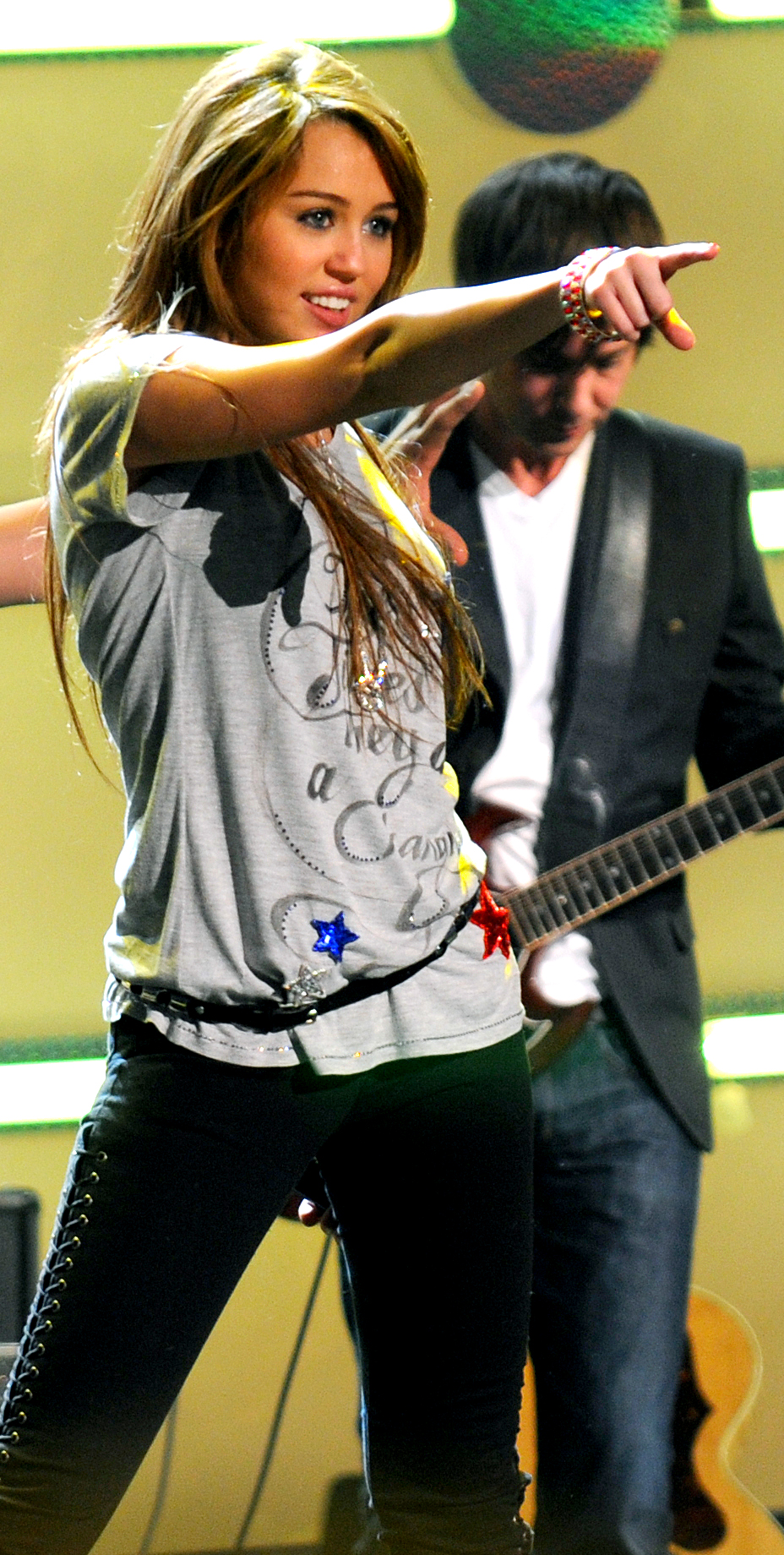
Cyrus performing "Fly on the Wall" at the Kids' Inaugural: "We Are the Future"

For the week ending August 9, 2008, "Fly on the Wall" charted at number 69 on Digital Songs due to the release of Breakout, but failed to reach the Billboard Hot 100; the following week, the song completely fell from the sales chart. For the week ending January 10, 2009, the song debuted and peaked at number 84 in the Hot 100 due to airplay, leaving the chart after two weeks. The song also reached number 64 on the now-discontinued Pop 100 chart. In the Canadian Hot 100, the peaked and debuted at number 73 on the week ending August 9, 2008, due to digital downloads. It then ascended and descended the Canadian Hot 100 before reaching its last week, ending on February 7, 2009.

The song was more successful in European nations. For the week ending January 31, 2009, "Fly on the Wall" debuted on the UK Singles Chart at number 90. Throughout February, the song moved up, finding new peaks for three consecutive weeks. For the week ending February 28, the song ascended to number 16 and became Cyrus' second best charting single in the United Kingdom at the time. It then slid several spots down, until its last week on the singles chart at number 86, for the week ending April 4. In the European Hot 100, "Fly on the Wall" peaked at number fifty-seven on the week ending March 7, 2009 and spent a total of five weeks on the chart. The song spent two weeks and peaked at number 23 on the Irish Singles Chart. In Austria, the song debuted and peaked on the week ending March 18 at number 57 and fell from the chart after two weeks. It spent seven weeks in Germany, where it debuted and peaked at 62.

== Music video ==
Cyrus in the music video for "Fly on the Wall" beside her car while trying to hide from the paparazzi. The video, particularly Cyrus' attempted escape from the paparazzi, is inspired by Michael Jackson's Thriller.

In an interview with MTV News, director Philip Andelman explained that Cyrus was already determined to poke fun at the paparazzi when she contacted him for a "Fly on the Wall" music video. Andelman did not want to create "something too serious" and worked to give the video a "playful" aspect. Cyrus elaborated on the concept of the music video in an interview with Nancy O'Dell of Access Hollywood. Cyrus said,

"The concept is kind of 'Thriller'-esque [sic]. It's kind of like where the paparazzi become these zombies and they're all like attacking me. And my boyfriend is trying to save me, but I don't know if he's a paparazzi too. So, it's like me trying to hide and get away. It's really fun, but I'm escaping from my boyfriend and escaping from the paparazzi and trying to find my way through the whole video."

The video commences with a short segment of dramatic music. It then focuses on Cyrus, wearing a white tank top, jeans, boots and a black leather jacket, and her boyfriend leaving a theater and discussing the film they saw. Suddenly, Cyrus' boyfriend begins to cough as a full moon emerges from behind the clouds. Cyrus is confused, then horrified as she watches him transform into a paparazzo, and runs away from him as he shouts "Miley, come here! I just want a couple of shots!" and tries to snap pictures of her. The music of "Fly on the Wall" begins as Cyrus runs into a parking garage and tries to hide behind a pillar and a black Mercedes-Benz SLR McLaren. As soon as Cyrus tries to move away from the car, a mob of paparazzi begins to chase her with their cameras. Throughout much of the video, Cyrus runs and hides from the mob. Clips interspaced throughout the video feature her in a long silver shirt and jeans singing and dancing in front of the Mercedes. Eventually, Cyrus is cornered by the paparazzi. She is scared, but then surprised and perplexed when the mob unexpectedly begins to dance in a synchronized manner. Her boyfriend, appearing normal, then arrives in the Mercedes to rescue her. Inside the car, Cyrus describes her strange encounter with the paparazzi to him. Unbeknownst to Cyrus, he has planted a video camera in the car; the video concludes with a shot of the website he posts the video on beneath the headline, "Miley Cyrus Bugs at Paparazzi!!!" The "Fly on the Wall" music video was first seen on December 5, 2008, on MTV's FNMTV. The video is inspired by Michael Jackson's iconic music video, "Thriller", but trades zombies for paparazzi. MTV also compared the "Fly on the Wall" video to those for Britney Spears' "Circus" and Lindsay Lohan's "Rumors".

== Live performances ==
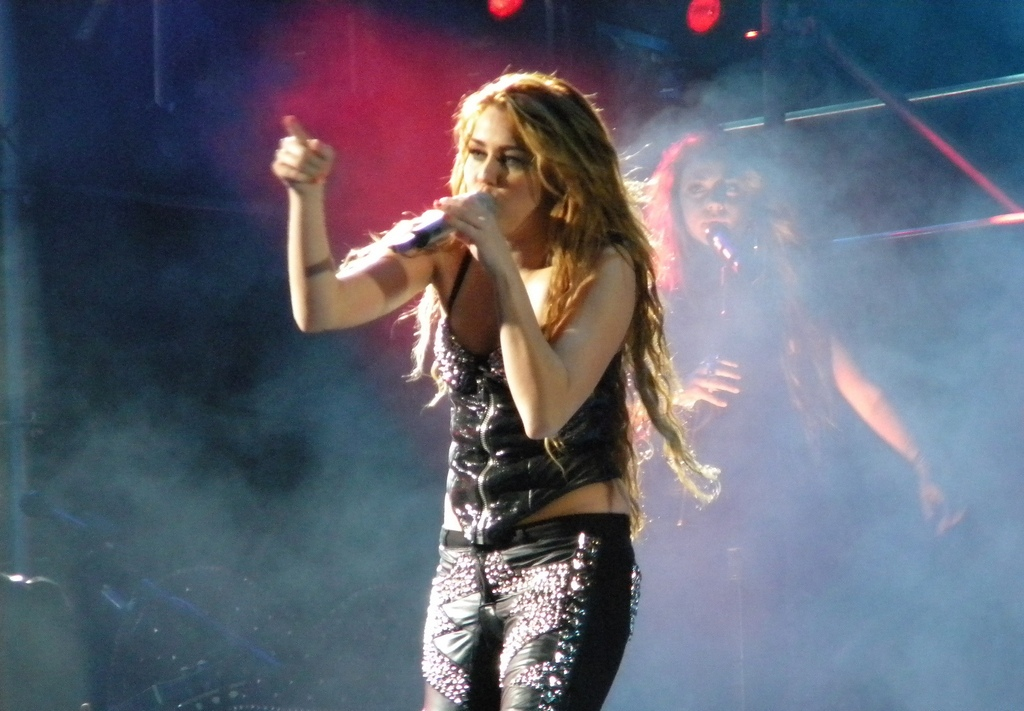
Cyrus performing "Fly on the Wall" on her Gypsy Heart Tour (2011)

Cyrus first performed the song at the opening ceremony of the 2008 Disney Channel Games on May 4, 2008. The performance had Cyrus in a red coat and was later used a promotional music video on Disney Channel. On May 17, 2008, she performed the song at the 2008 Zootopia. On July 18, 2008, the song was performed in a concert series for Good Morning America along with "Breakout", "7 Things" and "Bottom of the Ocean". During the performance, Cyrus wore a plaid shirt, mini-shorts and boots. On August 1, 2008, Cyrus performed "Fly on the Wall" on FNMTV. On November 21, it was sung at the American Music Awards of 2008. A critic from ABC stated that Cyrus "fearlessly embraced new creative directions" with her performance of "Fly on the Wall". On November 25, Cyrus performed the song on the season finale of Dancing with the Stars. On New Year's Eve of 2008, Cyrus wore a white T-shirt, pants, boots and a plaid jacket to present FNMTV's New Year's Special with Pete Wentz. She opened the episode by performing the song, paired with "7 Things". On January 19, 2009, the song was performed at the Kids' Inaugural: "We Are the Future" event in celebration of Barack Obama's inauguration. For the event, she had an abundance of background dancers, and Cyrus wore a casual patterned gray T-shirt, black pants, and boots. On February 14, 2009, Cyrus performed the song live on the British television variety show Ant & Dec's Saturday Night Takeaway where she momentarily forgot the lyrics, reportedly mouthing "I forgot the words!" to one of her backup dancers, and prompting media coverage over the blunder. She also performed the song in London in an Apple Store. The set, with some songs by Cyrus' father, was sold exclusively by the United Kingdom iTunes Store as an extended play titled iTunes Live from London. On June 7, 2009, at the twentieth annual A Time for Heroes Celebrity Carnival, Cyrus performed "Fly on the Wall".

"Fly on the Wall" was one of the songs on the setlist of Cyrus' first international concert tour, the Wonder World Tour (2009). The performance began with two overhead screens displaying a frog catching a fly while two acrobats scaled imaginary walls. Cyrus and her dancers then emerged from a green tractor to begin the song. She wore an extravagant white dress with a feathered back and used elaborate choreography. At one point during the performance, Cyrus unexpectedly flew over the crowd for a few seconds. At the conclusion, Cyrus and her background dancers grouped together to perform a segment of the dance from Michael Jackson's "Thriller" music video. She performed it at the Rock in Rio concert in Lisbon, Portugal on May 29, 2010 and Madrid, Spain on June 4, 2010. Cyrus also performed the song during her Gypsy Heart Tour (2011) dressed in a leather black tank top and pants, where it was the ninth song on the setlist. It was performed most recently during the South America part of her Attention Tour (2022).

== Track listing and formats ==
CD

1. "Fly on the Wall" – 2:31
2. "7 Things" (Bimbo Jones radio edit) – 2:58
3. "Fly on the Wall" (Jason Nevins remix; radio edit) – 2:52

Digital download (2 track single)

1. "Fly on the Wall" – 2:31
2. "Fly on the Wall" (Jason Nevins remix; radio edit) – 2:52

Digital download (Digital Dog remix)

1. "Fly on the Wall" – 2:31
2. "Fly on the Wall" (Digital Dog remix) – 5:40

Digital download (extended play)

1. "Fly on the Wall" – 2:31
2. "Fly on the Wall" (Jason Nevins remix; radio edit) – 2:52
3. "7 Things" (Bimbo Jones radio edit) – 2:58

== Charts ==
Chart performance
Chart (2008–2009)	Peak position
Austria (Ö3 Austria Top 40)	57
Canada Hot 100 (Billboard)	73
Germany (GfK)	62
Ireland (IRMA)	23
UK Singles (Official Charts)	16
US Billboard Hot 100	84

== Certifications ==
Certifications and sales
Region	Certification	Certified units/sales
Australia (ARIA)	Gold	35,000^{‡}
United States (RIAA)	Platinum	1,000,000^{‡}
^{‡} Sales+streaming figures based on certification alone.

== Release history ==
Release dates and formats
Region	Date	Format	Label	Ref.
United States	November 4, 2008	Contemporary hit radio	Hollywood	
United Kingdom	February 16, 2009	CD	Polydor	
Germany	March 6, 2009	CD	Universal	
