= Mike Schmid (musician) =

American singer/songwriter

Mike Schmid is an American singer/songwriter, as well as the keyboard player and backing vocalist for The Chainsmokers, Miley Cyrus, Troye Sivan and many other pop acts.

== Career ==
Schmid began his career in the band Aggressive Little Juice Machine. He then went on to release his debut self-titled album in 2001. In 2006, he released "The High Cost of Living (A Love Story)" and the Christmas EP "Snow Day". In 2008, the album "The House We Built" was released and "Let It Out" released in 2011.

Schmid is the keyboardist for Miley Cyrus, and has been performing with her since she was Hannah Montana at 13 years old. In addition, he was the bandleader, keyboardist and background vocalist for Troye Sivan. After that he was the keyboardist and background vocalist for The Chainsmokers and has worked with Broods, Daya, Cassidee Pope, Sara Ramirez, Connie Kim, Jen Foster, Jordan Fisher, Sabrina Carpenter, Laura Morano, Right the Stars, Christina Grimmie, Betty Who, Jonas Brothers, Billy Ray Cyrus, Sheryl Crow, Who Is Fancy, Arden Cho, Heffron Drive, Rob Giles, Colton Dixon and Stefano Langone, Kenna, Chantal Kreviazuk, Van Hunt, Aly & AJ, the Corrs, Jessica Sanchez, and others.

He has also written and sung on dance collaborations with international DJs including: "No One Can Touch You Now" with Cosmic Gate, "Follow" with Noah Neiman, "Restart" with KhoMha, as well as "Stay with Me, "Heart of Stone," and "Flash X" with ATB.

Schmid has been on tours, including: Memories Do Not Open (The Chainsmokers), Wonder World Tour, Best of Both Worlds Tour, Gypsy Heart Tour, the Bangerz Tour (Miley Cyrus), and The Blue Neighborhood Tour (Troye Sivan).

He has played on television shows such as The Tonight Show, Good Morning America The Today Show, Saturday Night Live, Ellen, American Idol, The Voice: Belgium, and James Corden.

He won the grand prize in the USA Songwriting Competition in 2012 for his song "Can You See All the Colors."

His songs have been featured in several TV shows including So You Think You Can Dance, The Real World, Felicity, The Bad Girls Club, and Flashpoint, "CSI:Miami," "Jersey Shore," "Friday Night Lights," "Made,""All My Children, The X Factor,""Charmed," "Everwood,""The Black Donnellys," and in the film "The Ultimate Gift".

He has released six albums.

He has been featured as a keyboardist in videos including the "Backyard Sessions" videos, "Troye Sivan, Youth Acoustic Sydney Session", and has played at the World Music Awards alongside Miley Cyrus.

== Personal life ==
Schmid has a 12-year-old son and a wife. They currently reside in Los Angeles.

He attended Waynesboro Area Senior High School, Waynesboro, PA. He graduated from Berklee College of Music in Boston in 2001 with a degree in song writing.
