= 7 Things =

2008 single by Miley Cyrus

Single by Miley Cyrus

from the album Breakout
- Released: May 13, 2008
- Studio: Studio Wishbone (Los Angeles, CA); East Iris Studios (Nashville, TN); Flowers Studio (Minneapolis, MN)
- Genre: Pop-punk
- Length: 3:33
- Label: Hollywood
- Songwriters: Miley Cyrus; Antonina Armato; Tim James
- Producer: John Fields

Miley Cyrus singles chronology
"Start All Over" (2007)	"7 Things" (2008)	"Fly on the Wall" (2008)

Music video
- "7 Things" on YouTube

"7 Things" is a song by American singer Miley Cyrus. The song was co-written by Cyrus, Antonina Armato and Tim James, and produced by John Fields. It was released on June 17, 2008, by Hollywood Records as the lead single from Cyrus' second studio album Breakout (2008), with no ties to her character Hannah Montana from the Disney Channel comedy series of the same name. Also registered as "Seven Things I Hate About You", Cyrus developed the song during the Best of Both Worlds Tour while feeling numerous emotions for an ex-boyfriend, mainly anger. The song's release prompted allegations that it was about Nick Jonas of the Jonas Brothers, which Cyrus neither confirmed nor denied. Musically, "7 Things" bears aspects of both country and pop punk, while the lyrics in the song's refrain list seven traits Cyrus hates about an ex-boyfriend.

"7 Things" received mixed to positive reviews from music critics and enjoyed worldwide commercial success, becoming a top ten hit on charts in Australia, Japan, Norway, and the United States. The single was certified double platinum by the Australian Recording Industry Association (ARIA) and the Recording Industry Association of America (RIAA), while its appearance on the Japan Hot 100 made "7 Things" Cyrus' first song to chart in an Asian country. The song's accompanying music video was directed by Brett Ratner and features Cyrus performing the song with a backup band as many teenage girls lip-sync along. The girls clutch a variety of props, such as love letters and snow globes, inspired by personal items Cyrus' ex had given her. The video was nominated for an MTV Video Music Award at both the 2008 and 2009 award shows. Cyrus promoted the song through several venues including her world tours, the Wonder World Tour and the Gypsy Heart Tour. On May 13, 2008, the song premiered on Elvis Duran and the Morning Show before its official release as a single.

== Background ==
"7 Things" is also under the legal title of "Seven Things I Hate About You", as registered by Broadcast Music Incorporated (BMI). Like most of the songs on Breakout, Cyrus conceived "7 Things" while traveling on the Best of Both Worlds Tour from October 2007 to January 2008.

"I was locked up in the bus the entire time. And it was, like, such a great time for me to have a minute for myself, which I never get. So it was awesome to get to do that and just kinda go through all the different stages of what's been going on the last couple of years. And I just thought it'd be fun to just kinda. I didn't even mean for it to be for, you know, the record or for anything. It was just like 'just start writing this'. I got into it and I played some of it for my sister and she was like, 'dude, that's awesome'. And it was just so much fun to have, like, a good, little therapy moment for me, just to be able to go through everything. It was awesome. It was so much fun to write."

Cyrus says "7 Things" was inspired by an ex-boyfriend. In an interview with Ryan Seacrest, Cyrus said that she was "going through [...] nine-hundred different emotions while trying to write the song" and that her use of the word "hate" demonstrated how furious she was. When Seacrest asked if she was worried the song's subject would hear it and be upset, Cyrus responded that while she was slightly worried, "I want him to be upset. That was my point." She showed her draft to co-songwriters and producers Tim James and Antonina Armato, who suggested adding it to Breakout. Originally, "7 Things" was more "soft and nice" but Cyrus says she "went nuts" during the recording process and gave the song a harder sound. Cyrus had initially chosen "Fly on the Wall" as the lead single from Breakout, but replaced it with "7 Things" because she felt it was a "better introduction" to the album.

=== Nick Jonas allegations ===
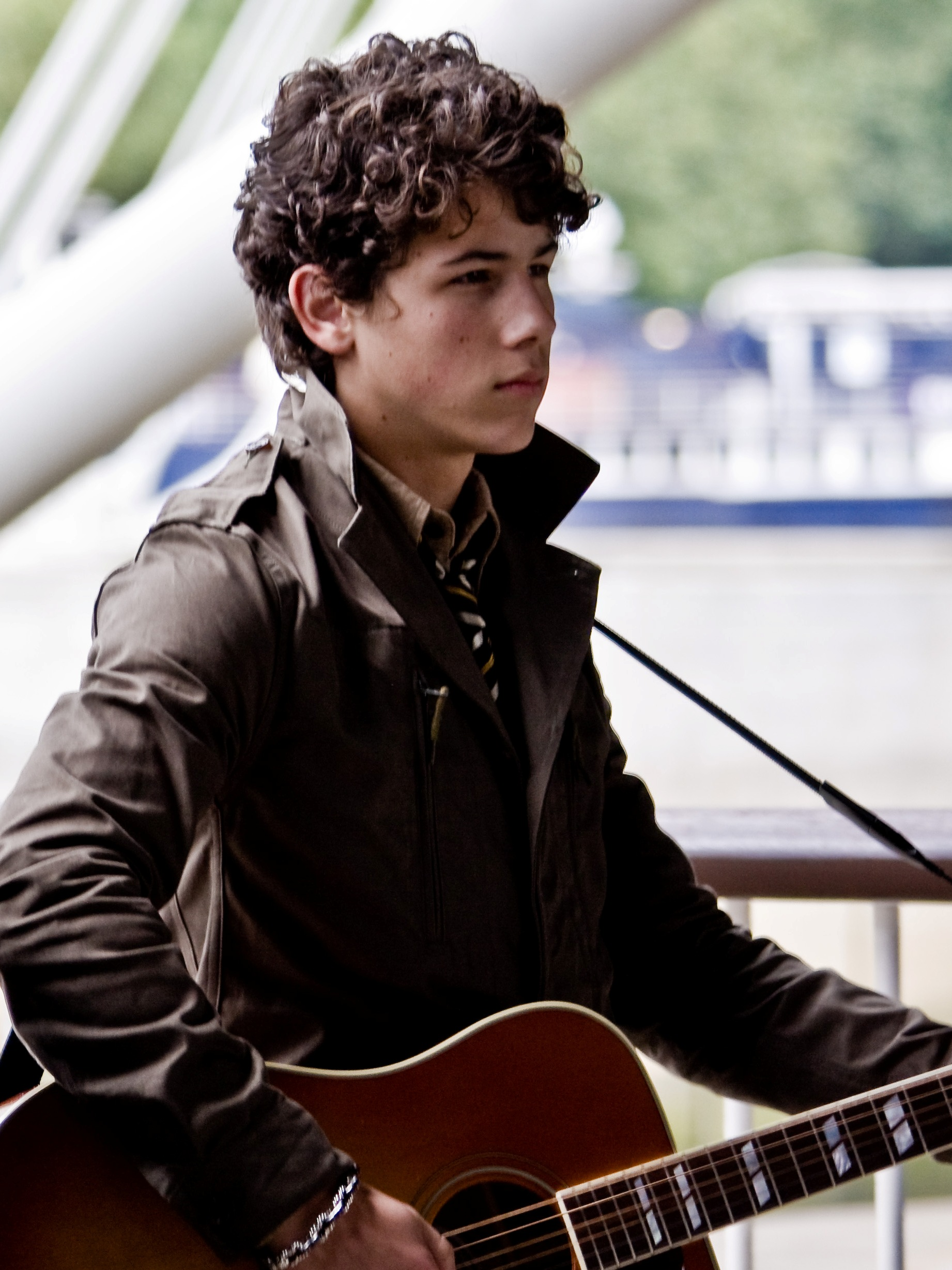
The release of "7 Things" was followed by allegations that it was about Nick Jonas of the Jonas Brothers.

Allegations that "7 Things" was about Nick Jonas, lead singer of the Jonas Brothers, arose soon after the song's premiere on the May 13, 2008 broadcast of Elvis Duran and the Morning Show. Cyrus and Jonas had dated for a year and a half before breaking up in late 2007. Cyrus claimed, "Nick and I loved each other" and that after the breakup she "bawled for a month straight" while trying to rebel "against everything Nick wanted [her] to be".

Henry Freeland of Paste described "7 Things" as "the list of reasons she hates an ex-boyfriend (who just might be lead Jonas Brother, Nick)" and her "concern [...] that all of this hatred only leads them to love Maybe-Nick [...] all the more". Blogger Molly Lambert, quoted in The New York Times said, "[Cyrus] had recently broken up with her first serious boyfriend — a fellow Disney celebrity, Nick Jonas, of the Jonas Brothers, who was also her arena-concert tour mate during their secret two-year affair. In the video for '7 Things' she wears Nick's diabetes dog tags while singing about how his vanity and insecurity undermined their relationship." Jessica Herndon of People similarly points out the necklace and the fact that Jonas, "who split with Cyrus in late 2008 after two-and a half years of dating – has Type 1 diabetes and is a spokesperson for awareness of the disease." When asked if the allegations were true, Cyrus said,

"[W]ith '7 Things,' I think a lot of people do, you know, think it's about Nick Jonas, and if they think it is, that's fine, or whoever they think it's about. But mostly that song is about who, um, they want it to be to. Like mostly, it's if a girl hates her current, or ex-boyfriend—for me it's an ex-boyfriend—so I think, you know, like, Nick is someone that was really important in my life, but I don't hate him. It's a good song and it's fun."

Jonas responded to the allegations with, "I think it's funny. Honestly, I'm not insecure, my friends are cool—so it can't be about me!" According to Tiger Beat magazine, when Cyrus' best friend Mandy Jiroux was asked if "7 Things" was about Jonas, she responded, "yes".

== Composition ==
Miley Cyrus - "7 Things" (2008)
The uptempo refrains of Miley Cyrus' "7 Things" are pop rock influenced.

"7 Things" is a pop song with a length of three minutes and 33 seconds. According to Sal Cinquemani of Slant Magazine, the song's verses are tinged with country while its refrains bear pop punk aspects. The song is set in common time and has moderate rock tempo of 108 beats per minute. It is written in the key of E major while Cyrus' vocals span two octaves, ranging from C#_{3} to C#_{5}. Fraser McAlpine of the BBC called the song "a three-tempo patchwork quilt". In the song's introduction, the band begins to strum acoustic guitars at a moderate tempo while Cyrus chants "sha". The tempo continues as Cyrus begins the first verse in the song's fourth bar. At each chorus, "7 Things" speeds up dramatically and Cyrus' vocals become aggressive and forceful; Chris Willman of Entertainment Weekly described the transition as "from sensitive breakup song in the strummy verses to punky-pop kiss-off in the double-time choruses." McAlpine noted the stress Cyrus places on vowels in the song: "'yerw' instead of 'you', 'erw' instead of 'oh', and so on...".

The song's lyrics are written in second person, a message from the singer to her ex-boyfriend detailing the hurt he caused her while they were dating. The refrain is a list of the seven traits the singer "hates" most about her ex, with the seventh item being her frustration that despite his flaws, he makes her love him. Ben Ratliff of The New York Times noted that the list actually "runs to 8 to 11 things, depending on how you parse it". Henry Freedland of Paste magazine compared it to a similar list featured as a poem in the 1999 film 10 Things I Hate About You. In one verse, Cyrus asks for a sincere apology and states, "If you text it, I'll delete it", which Molly Lambert of The New York Times said "perfectly captur[es] our confusing age of technologically mediated courtship." The song concludes with a variation of the refrain, in which Cyrus names the seven things she likes the most about her ex, again concluding with "you make me love you".

== Critical reception ==
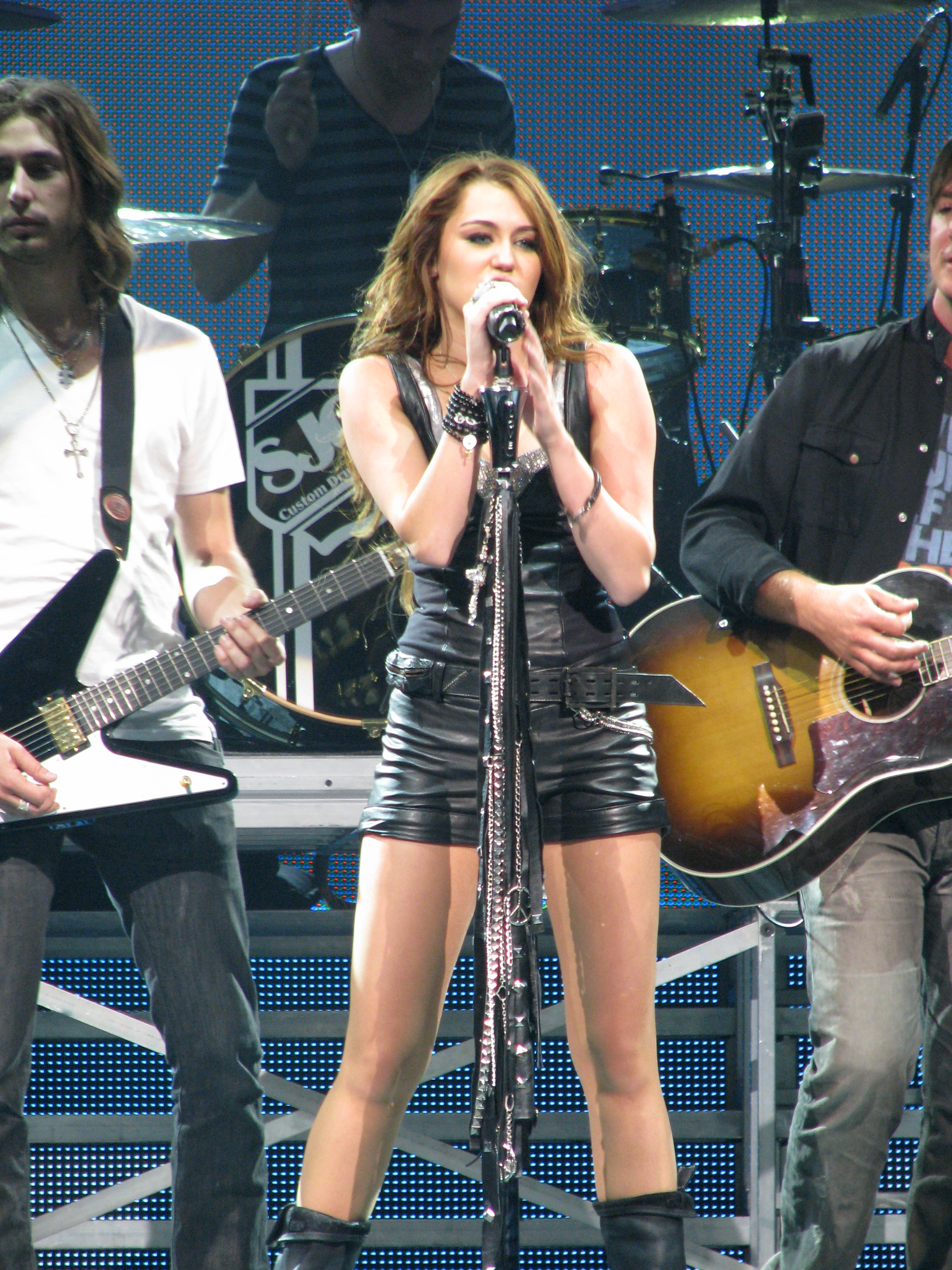
Cyrus performing "7 Things" on the Wonder World Tour

"7 Things" received mixed reviews from critics. Fraser McAlpine of the BBC called the song "smashing", complimenting Cyrus' "punker attitude all wrapped up in an immaculate gloss". Todd Martens of the Los Angeles Times wrote that while he wished the song had played up Cyrus' frustration rather than concluding with the kind final verse, "the winning, full-on chorus -- and Miley's exuberance -- are enough to make it a success." Ben Ratliff of The New York Times said "7 Things" "lists with talky insecurity what she hates about a guy" and calls "the seven things she likes [...] a shameless Disney ending". Heather Phares of Allmusic contended, "7 Things" is a twangy, clever piece of love-hate pop that feels descended from Shania Twain's flirty mix of rock and country" and marked it as one of the best tracks on Breakout. Chris Willman of Entertainment Weekly called it one of Breakout's "best tunes" because it "let Cyrus be feisty without graduating to Avril-like levels of petulance" while Josh Timmermann of PopMatters finds it "appealing".

Mordechai Shinefield of The Village Voice described the song as "hooky and catchy enough", but warned that "it's only a step away from warmed-over emo platitudes". Sarah Rodman of The Boston Globe claimed "[Avril] Lavigne's brand of pop-punk snarl creeps into '7 Things'." Robert Christgau labeled "7 Things" and "Breakout" the best songs on Breakout. Chris Richards of The Washington Post claimed the album's "overproduction is apparent on the chorus of the album's first single, "7 Things," an avalanche of guitars and rushed syllables." Sal Cinquemani of Slant Magazine called the single "rather annoying" and not "a worthy follow-up to 'See You Again'", while Bill Lamb of About.com said the "winning performance" demonstrated that "Miley Cyrus does not intend to simply be a TV-generated phenomenon in the pop music world. She is a compelling pop artist in her own right."

== Chart performance ==
On the week ending June 21, 2008, "7 Things" debuted at number 85 on the Billboard Hot 100. The song ascended to number 70 the week ending July 5, 2008, before jumping to number 10 in its third week due to sales of 130,000 digital downloads. "7 Things" moved up to number 9 on the week ending July 26, 2008, surpassing "See You Again" and becoming Cyrus' best charting effort on the Hot 100. The single managed to spend fifteen weeks on the Hot 100, and was ranked at number 92 in the Year-End in 2008. "7 Things" also peaked at number 14 on the now-canceled Pop 100 chart. In Canada, the song debuted at number 40 on the week ending July 5, 2008, and peaked at number 13 on the week ending July 26, 2008. As of March 2023, "7 Things" has sold 2,000,000 units in the United States and was certified two-times platinum by the Recording Industry Association of America (RIAA).

"7 Things" was also a success in Australia and New Zealand. The song made its debut on the Australian Singles Chart at number 38 on August 17, 2008. After five weeks, "7 Things" reached its peak on the chart at number 10. The song has been certified gold by the Australian Recording Industry Association (ARIA) for shipping over 35,000 copies. "7 Things" debuted at number 27 on the New Zealand Singles Chart on August 17, 2008, and, after eight weeks on the chart, reached number 24. "7 Things" also became Cyrus' first song to chart in an Asian country: on the week ending September 27, 2008, "7 Things" debuted at number 81 on the Japan Hot 100; it reached number 9 on the week ending October 17, 2008, and reached its peak at number 8 on the week ending October 24, 2008.

In the UK Singles Chart, "7 Things" made its entry at number 87 on September 13, 2008, and reached its peak at number 25 on December 13, 2008. In mainland Europe, the song peaked at number 44 on Eurochart Hot 100 Singles and at number 14 in Austria. "7 Things" debuted and peaked at number 8 on the Norwegian Singles Chart on August 19, 2008. The song experienced similar commercial outcomes throughout the rest of Europe; it charted within the top 40 of charts in Belgium (Flanders and Wallonia), Germany, and Switzerland.

== Music video ==
Cyrus wears her ex-boyfriend's medical identification tag in the "7 Things" music video.

Cyrus invited Brett Ratner, director of the "7 Things" music video, to her home to tell him how much the song meant to her and what it was about. After proposing numerous ideas to each other, they decided to make the video "simple with a white backdrop". Cyrus said that neither she nor Ratner wanted the video to be "all about [her]" because the song's message was universal; "almost every girl in America could say they hate their ex or current boyfriend," claimed Cyrus. As a result, the video features numerous adolescent girls including actresses Nicola Peltz, Liana Liberato, Hunter King, and Maiara Walsh. During the planning session, Cyrus showed Ratner a collection of personal items her ex had given her, such as photographs and his dirty socks, which she had stowed away beneath her bed. They decided to include some of these items as props in the music video. For example, the necklace Cyrus wears in the video was her ex-boyfriend's medical identification tag, which he received because of his diabetes mellitus.

The video was shot on May 30, 2008, in Los Angeles, California. Unexpectedly, several girls began crying during the shoot; Cyrus attributed this to the emotions in the song. Ratner was impressed with Cyrus' instinct and ability to address emotional issues while making them "fun at the same time". Ratner compared her to Madonna, saying, "she can be hanging out and laughing, and then you put the camera on her and it's like, 'Holy shit!'" The effervescence made editing more difficult for the director. He said, "It was the hardest video I've ever edited because every moment was great. Every moment that she was on camera, she was amazing. She's got an incredible quality about her. She gets the camera, and that's what it takes to make a great music video." Cyrus commented that she felt the video was "more honest than [the] song" and that she was "singing out to [...] that special person".

The video commences with a close-up shot of Cyrus' face as she counts in the backup band behind her. For a moment, she is replaced by a different girl holding a small stuffed monkey. Cyrus then reappears, holding onto her necklace and wearing a multicolored sequin sundress designed by Sass & Bide, black Chuck Taylor All-Stars, and leg warmers. Her wavy hair is styled loose and in front of her shoulders. As Cyrus continues to sing, she is replaced by more girls holding different items, including teddy bears, stuffed animals, snow globes, and love letters. As the song approaches its chorus, Cyrus and the girls start dancing and jumping. Cyrus continues singing as she holds a white rose and a girl deletes a text message from her boyfriend. At one point, Cyrus holds a photograph of her and an ex-boyfriend with black curly hair, his face obscured by a doodle on a piece of notebook paper. At the end of the video, Cyrus blows the camera a kiss, mouths "I love you," and turns away.

=== Video reception ===
The video premiered on June 28, 2008 on ABC. It was the most watched music-related video on YouTube until it was surpassed by Lady Gaga's "Bad Romance" music video in spring 2010. Todd Martens of the Los Angeles Times was disappointed with the video's special effects and production values, adding that it looked "as if it were filmed with one camera on a tripod in a single-bulb basement". However, he complimented how they "show[ed] off Miley's universal appeal". Henry Freeland of Paste magazine said, "Cyrus wiggles to and fro, mugging for the camera like her face is fighting gravity and barely winning." A Pop Cultured review from MTV described the video as PG and "Disney approved". The review continued that it was mildly angry, comparing Cyrus to "a watered-down version of Avril Lavigne's kid sister, and Lindsay Lohan's pseudo-rebellious character in Freaky Friday — minus the eyeliner". Leigh Holmwood of The Guardian commented, "Miley's new music vid, reminds me, creepily enough, of early Britney." Molly Lambert of The New York Times described Cyrus as the video's "charismatic center" and writes, "When she flashes Nick's dog tags and a picture of the two of them together, she seems so vindictive and so embarrassingly vulnerable, just like . . . a 15-year-old suffering her first serious heartbreak, basically." The video received a nomination for MTV Video Music Award for Best New Artist at the 2008 MTV Video Music Awards, but lost to Tokio Hotel's music video for "Ready, Set, Go!". At the 2009 MTV Video Music Awards, the video received a nomination for MTV Video Music Award for Best Editing, but lost to Beyoncé's music video for "Single Ladies (Put a Ring on It)".

== Live performances ==
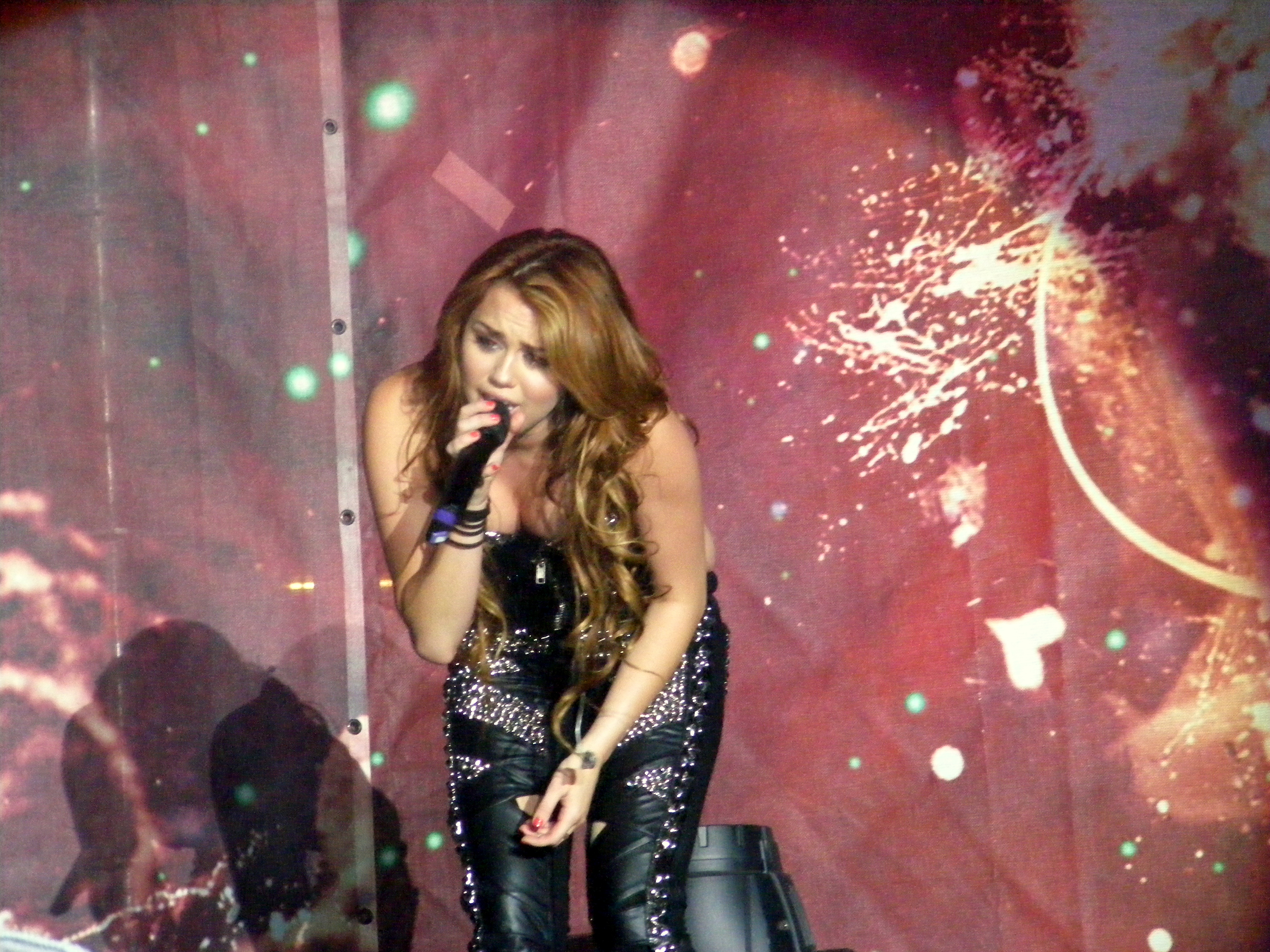
Cyrus performing "7 Things" during the Gypsy Heart Tour

Cyrus offered a sneak preview of "7 Things" on May 13, 2008, on Elvis Duran's popular morning zoo radio show of WHTZ in the Greater New York area. She was promoting her appearance in four days at Zootopia, an annual summer concert put on by WHTZ, where she performed the song live for the first time. Later that summer, she promoted the song at outdoor concerts hosted by Good Morning America and The Today Show and while hosting the 2008 Teen Choice Awards. Cyrus began promotion for "7 Things" in Europe in fall 2008, performing the track on the United Kingdom breakfast TV show GMTV, the French television show Le Grand Journal and the British singing competition The X Factor among other venues. She performed the song twice on FNMTV; once on August 1, 2008, and again while co-hosting New Year's Eve 2008 with Pete Wentz.

Cyrus performed "7 Things" along with several other songs on April 24, 2009 in a London Apple Store. These performances were recorded and sold exclusively by the United Kingdom iTunes Store as a live extended play titled iTunes Live from London. On June 7, 2009, Cyrus performed the song at the twentieth annual A Time for Heroes Celebrity Carnival, an outdoor carnival supporting the Elizabeth Glaser Pediatric AIDS Foundation. "7 Things" was also included in the set list of Cyrus' first world tour, the Wonder World Tour; Cyrus performed the song in a black leather ensemble paired with a silver rosary while overhead video screens projected a conflagration. Melinda M. Thompsen of The Oregonian said Cyrus' performance of "7 Things" during the September 14 concert in Portland, Oregon at the Rose Garden Arena "showed what a powerhouse she can be using her voice and influence to get her message out". The song's performance during the September 22 concert in Los Angeles, California at the Staples Center was referred to as "aggressive athleticism" by Lael Loewenstein of Variety and as a "tween-rock gem" and "up-tempo highlight" by Mikael Wood of the Los Angeles Times. She later performed the song at the Rock in Rio concerts in Lisbon, Portugal and Madrid, Spain.

Cyrus performed the song during the Gypsy Heart Tour.

In 2021, Cyrus began performing "7 Things" at music festivals for the first time since 2011's Gypsy Heart Tour, reintroducing the song during her Lollapalooza set.

== Charts ==
=== Weekly charts ===
Weekly chart performance
Chart (2008)	Peak position
Australia (ARIA)	10
Austria (Ö3 Austria Top 40)	14
Belgium (Ultratop 50 Flanders)	22
Belgium (Ultratop 50 Wallonia)	22
Canada Hot 100 (Billboard)	13
Canada CHR/Top 40 (Billboard)	38
Canada Hot AC (Billboard)	44
France (SNEP) Download Charts	32
Germany (GfK)	17
Ireland (IRMA)	26
Italy (FIMI)	29
Japan Hot 100 (Billboard)	8
Netherlands (Single Top 100)	80
New Zealand (Recorded Music NZ)	24
Norway (VG-lista)	8
Scottish Singles Sales (Official Charts)	15
Switzerland (Schweizer Hitparade)	35
UK Singles (Official Charts)	25
US Billboard Hot 100	9
US Pop Airplay (Billboard)	19

=== Year-end charts ===
Year-end chart performance
Chart (2008)	Position
Australia (ARIA)	50
Canada (Canadian Hot 100)	86
UK Singles (OCC)	170
US Billboard Hot 100	92

== Certifications ==
Certifications and sales
Region	Certification	Certified units/sales
Australia (ARIA)	2× Platinum	140,000^{‡}
New Zealand (RMNZ)	Gold	7,500^{*}
United Kingdom (BPI)	Silver	200,000^{‡}
United States (RIAA)	2× Platinum	2,000,000^{‡}
^{*} Sales figures based on certification alone.^{‡} Sales+streaming figures based on certification alone.

== Release history ==
Release dates and formats
Region	Date	Format	Label	Ref.
Australia	August 25, 2008	CD single	EMI	
Germany	September 12, 2008	CD single	Universal	
United Kingdom	November 8, 2008	CD single	Polydor	
