= Hannah Montana: Live in London =

2007 concert by Miley Cyrus

- Concert by Miley Cyrus
- Associated album: Hannah Montana; Hannah Montana 2
- Start date: March 28, 2007
- Duration: 30 minutes

Miley Cyrus concert chronology
- Hannah Montana: Live in London (2007); Best of Both Worlds Tour (2007–08)

Hannah Montana: Live in London was a concert held at the Koko Club on March 28, 2007 in London, England featuring Miley Cyrus as her fictional alter-ego, Hannah Montana. It was filmed for television broadcast and aired in numerous countries.

The concert was her first live performance as Hannah Montana in the United Kingdom. She performed songs from the Hannah Montana and Hannah Montana 2 albums and also answered some questions from fans in the audience. At the concert, Cyrus was introduced by Natasha Hamilton from girl pop group Atomic Kitten. Cyrus's sister Brandi Cyrus also participated.

Reviewing the concert live for The Independent on Sunday, Ian Irvine noted the enthusiasm of the pre-teen crowd of 500. Cyrus, he said, wore "vertiginous heels and skintight denim," looking "much more grown-up than she did in the first series." He called her "a precociously accomplished singer and dancer." She performed the first four songs twice for the benefit of the cameras, before finishing with "The Best of Both Worlds." Irvine wrote that at the end of the concert the venue was "filled with a snowstorm of confetti" as "pyrotechnic flashes burst on the stage."

Attendees received a Disney gift bag, which Times writer Ed Potton wrote was greeted with the "biggest cheers."

The concert and television special were part of a strategy exploring synergies between the Disney Channel and Walt Disney Records. The concert was also part of a publicity blitz to boost viewership for the second season of Hannah Montana. When tickets for the concert were distributed to Disney Channel viewers in the United Kingdom through a telephone call in, the network received 70,000 phone calls. Five hundred winners received tickets.

The television special was produced and directed by Philippa Wells. The production company was Rival Media. It aired on Disney Channel in the United States on July 16, 2007.

== Setlist ==
1. "Life's What You Make It"
2. "Nobody's Perfect"
3. "Make Some Noise"
4. "Pumpin' Up the Party"
5. "The Best of Both Worlds"

== International release ==
- United Kingdom; May 7, 2007
- Italy: Disney Channel (Italy); July 18, 2007
- Latin America: Disney Channel Latin America; September 22, 2007
- Pakistan: Disney Channel Middle East; December 2007
- India: Disney Channel India; January 1, 2008
