= This Is the Life (Hannah Montana song) =

Song by Hannah Montana

from the album Hannah Montana
- Released: October 24, 2006
- Recorded: 2005
- Genre: Pop rock; teen pop; country pop
- Length: 3:02
- Label: Walt Disney
- Songwriters: Jeannie Lurie; Shari Short
- Producer: Marco Marinangeli

"This Is the Life" is a song by fictional character Hannah Montana, recorded by American singer and actress Miley Cyrus for the soundtrack of the Disney Channel series Hannah Montana. The song was written by Jeannie Lurie and Shari Short and produced by Marco Marinangeli. In the United States, the song peaked at number eighty-three on the Billboard Hot 100 and within the top seventy on the Pop 100. Its appearance on the Billboard Hot 100 made Cyrus the first act to have seven songs appear on the chart in the same week. A music video for "This Is the Life" was released, taken from footage of a concert performance.

== Background and composition ==
"This Is the Life" was composed by Jeannie Lurie and Shari Short. A karaoke version appears on Disney's Karaoke Series: Hannah Montana (2007), while a remixed version appears on Hits Remixed (2008). The song first premiered on Radio Disney on 2006 in order to promote the series.

"This Is the Life" is pop song with a length of three minutes and fifteen seconds. The song incorporates various teen pop styles within its music, according to Allmusic. The song is set in common time and has a moderate tempo of 120 beats per minute. It is written in the key of E major and Cyrus' vocals span two octaves, from B_{3} to C♯_{5}. "This Is the Life" follows the chord progression of E–A. Chris William of Entertainment Weekly perceived the lyrics of "This Is the Life" pertained to individualism, noting the lines "I'm individual / I'm not like anyone".

Cyrus has stated on multiple occasions that the song is her personal favorite from the Hannah Montana series. In a 2026 YouTube segment filmed for Variety, Cyrus also explained that the song was the first she recorded for the show as her alter-ego.

== Reception ==
=== Critical reception ===
Chris William of Entertainment Weekly described "This Is the Life"'s style as a simultaneous mimic of the styles of Avril Lavigne, Ashlee Simpson, and Britney Spears, which he felt contracted its lyrical theme.

=== Chart performance ===
As it was not released as a single, "This Is the Life" received exclusive airplay on Radio Disney, thus its chart appearances consisted mainly of digital downloads. On the week ending August 5, 2006, the song debuted at number ninety-two on the Billboard Hot 100; succeeding the appearance, the song dropped from the chart. Following the release of the Hannah Montana soundtrack, the song entered Billboard's Hot Digital Songs Chart at number forty-four, which led to a reappearance on the Billboard Hot 100 on the week ending November 11, 2006. The record was later duplicated by Taylor Swift. The song also peaked at number sixty-three on the now-defunct Pop 100 Chart. "This Is the Life" peaked at number sixty-five on the Hot Canadian Digital Singles Chart, but failed to enter the Canadian Hot 100.

== Live performances ==
Cyrus, costumed as Montana, first performed "This Is the Life", along with four other songs, at the concert taping for the first season of Hannah Montana. The performance was later released as the song's music video on April 10, 2006 on Disney Channel. Cyrus also performed the song on twenty dates in the fall of 2006, when she opened for the Cheetah Girls' 2006 and 2007 concert tour The Party's Just Begun Tour.

For the 2026 Hannah Montana 20th Anniversary Special on Disney+, Cyrus performed "This Is the Life" for the first time in nearly 20 years. It was one of three songs performed for the special along with "The Best of Both Worlds" and "The Climb."

== Charts ==
Chart (2006)	Peak position
Hot Canadian Digital Singles	65
U.S. Billboard Hot 100	83
U.S. Pop 100	63
