= Hits Remixed (album) =

2008 remix album by Hannah Montana

Hannah Montana Hits Remixed

Remix album / soundtrack album by Hannah Montana
- Released: August 19, 2008
- Genre: Pop rock
- Length: 25:18
- Label: Walt Disney
- Producers: Marco Marinangeli; Simone Sello; Jamie Houston; Toby Gad; Matthew Gerrard; Greg Wells; Kara DioGuardi; Antonina Armato; Tim James

Miley Cyrus chronology
Breakout (2008)	Hannah Montana Hits Remixed (2008)	Hannah Montana: The Movie (2009)

Hannah Montana Hits Remixed is the second remix album for the Disney Channel series Hannah Montana. All tracks are performed by the series' titular character Hannah Montana, portrayed by American singer and actress Miley Cyrus. It was released by Walt Disney Records on August 19, 2008, exclusively at American Walmart stores. The album contains remixes from the soundtrack albums, Hannah Montana and Hannah Montana 2. The album peaked at number 103 on the Billboard 200 charts and at number four in Top Kid Audio. All songs were remixed by music producers Marco Marinangeli and Simone Sello.

== Background ==
The album features singles that were released on both of the previous television soundtracks, Hannah Montana and Hannah Montana 2. Most of Hits Remixed, who have formerly collaborated for other Disney acts like High School Musical. The American Idol judge, Kara DioGuardi co-wrote and co-produced "We Got the Party" along with Greg Wells, Brian Green, Matthew Wilder and more. Other personnel include: Jamie Houston, Aris Archontis, Jeannie Lurie, Chen Neeman, Jay Landers and Holly Mathis.

Hannah Montana: Hits Remixed was sold exclusively on August 19, 2008, through the American retail company Walmart in the United States. That later changed as the album was released internationally, more than a year later.

== Chart performance ==
For the week ending September 6, 2008, Hannah Montana: Hits Remixed debuted and peaked at number one hundred-three in the United States, under the chart, Billboard 200. In its second week, the remix album completely fell from the chart. However, it also charted on Kid Albums, then Top Kid Audio, debuting in the top ten. For the week ending September 13, Hannah Montana: Hits Remixed reached number four on the chart. The album spent a total of seven weeks on the chart.

== Track listing ==
All tracks are produced by their original producers from both the Hannah Montana and Hannah Montana 2 soundtracks and are remixed by Marco Marinangeli and Simone Sello.

No.	Title	Writer(s)	Length
1.	"Pumpin' Up the Party"	Jamie Houston	3:14
2.	"The Other Side of Me"	Matthew Gerrard, Robbie Nevil	2:57
3.	"Rock Star"	Aris Archontis, Jeannie Lurie, Chen Neeman	3:06
4.	"We Got the Party"	Kara DioGuardi, Greg Wells	3:53
5.	"Who Said"	Gerrard, Nevil, Jay Landers	3:01
6.	"Nobody's Perfect"	Gerrard, Nevil	3:13
7.	"The Best of Both Worlds"	Gerrard, Nevil	2:50
8.	"If We Were a Movie"	Lurie, Holly Mathis	3:08

== Charts ==
Chart (2008)	Peak position
U.S. Billboard 200	103
U.S. Top Kid Audio	4

== Release history ==
Region	Date	Label	Format
United States	August 19, 2008	Walt Disney Records	CD, digital download
Australia	September 11, 2009	Walt Disney Records	CD, digital download
Austria	September 11, 2009	Walt Disney Records	CD, digital download
Mexico	September 11, 2009	Walt Disney Records	CD, digital download
Switzerland	September 11, 2009	Walt Disney Records	CD, digital download
