= Who Said =

Single by Hannah Montana

from the album Hannah Montana
- Released: July 11, 2006
- Genre: Pop rock; teen pop
- Length: 3:15
- Label: Walt Disney
- Songwriters: Matthew Gerrard; Robbie Nevil; Jay Landers
- Producer: Matthew Gerrard

Miley Cyrus singles chronology
"The Best of Both Worlds" (2006)	"Who Said" (2006)	"Nobody's Perfect" (2007)

"Who Said" is a song by fictional character Hannah Montana, recorded by American singer and actress Miley Cyrus for the soundtrack of the Disney Channel series Hannah Montana. It was released by Walt Disney Records on July 11, 2006, as the second and final single from the soundtrack album. The song was written by Matthew Gerrard, Robbie Nevil, and Jay Landers and produced by Gerrard. "Who Said" bears teen pop aspects musically, while its lyrics are about individualism.

In the United States, the song peaked at number eighty-three on the Billboard Hot 100 and within the top seventy on the Pop 100. Its appearance on the Billboard Hot 100 made Cyrus the first act to have seven songs appear on the chart in the same week. The song was also certified gold by the Recording Industry Association of America (RIAA). A music video for "Who Said" was released, taken from footage of a concert performance.

== Background and composition ==
"Who Said" (2006)
A 17 second sample of Hannah Montana's "Who Said", which includes the song's chorus.

"Who Said" was composed by Matthew Gerrard with the aid of Robbie Nevil and Jay Landers. Gerrard co-wrote a total of six songs on Hannah Montana while Nevil co-wrote four and Landers two. A karaoke version appears on Disney's Karaoke Series: Hannah Montana (2007), while a remixed version appears on Hits Remixed (2008). The song first premiered on Radio Disney on March 10, 2006, in order to promote the series and was afterward released as a single from Hannah Montana on July 11, 2006, to digital retailers. The album artwork for the release was the same as the soundtrack's.

"Who Said" is pop rock song with a length of three minutes and fifteen seconds. The song incorporates various teen pop styles within its music, according to Allmusic. The song is set in common time and has a moderate tempo of 120 beats per minute. It is written in the key of E major and Cyrus' vocals span two octaves, from B_{3} to C♯_{5}. "Who Said" follows the chord progression of E–A. Chris William of Entertainment Weekly perceived the lyrics of "Who Said" pertained to individualism, noting the lines "I'm individual / I'm not like anyone".

== Reception ==
=== Critical reception ===
Chris William of Entertainment Weekly described "Who Said"'s style as a simultaneous mimic of the styles of Avril Lavigne, Ashlee Simpson, and Britney Spears, which he felt contracted its lyrical theme.

=== Chart performance ===
As it was not released as a single, "Who Said" received exclusive airplay on Radio Disney, thus its chart appearances consisted mainly of digital downloads. On the week ending August 5, 2006, the song debuted at number ninety-two on the Billboard Hot 100; succeeding the appearance, the song dropped from the chart. Following the release of the Hannah Montana soundtrack, the song entered Billboard's Hot Digital Songs Chart at number forty-four, which led to a reappearance on the Billboard Hot 100 on the week ending November 11, 2006. "Who Said" re-entered the Billboard Hot 100 at its peak of eighty-three, thus becoming one of the songs to make Cyrus the female act with the most songs charting in the same week. The record was later duplicated by Taylor Swift. The song also peaked at number sixty-three on the now-defunct Pop 100 Chart. "Who Said" peaked at number sixty-five on the Hot Canadian Digital Singles chart.

== Live performances ==
Cyrus as Montana performs in the concert taping for the first season of Hannah Montana; it is used as the music video for "Who Said".

Cyrus, costumed as Montana, first performed "Who Said", along with six other songs, at the concert taping for the first season of Hannah Montana. In the performance, Cyrus dressed in a white tank top embroidered with a rhinestone cross, blue jeans with a loose, black miniskirt on top of it, black leather boots, and silver leather jacket. It began with Cyrus entering from behind a huge, illuminated sign that spelled "Hannah Montana". She then roamed throughout the stage singing the number. The performance was later released as the song's music video on April 10, 2006, on Disney Channel. Cyrus also performed the song on twenty dates in the fall of 2006, when she opened for the Cheetah Girls' 2006 and 2007 concert tour The Party's Just Begun Tour.

== Track listings ==
- United States digital single
1. "Who Said" – 3:17
- United States iTunes Store digital single
1. "Who Said" – 3:17
2. "Radio Disney Interview" – 1:25

== Charts ==
Chart (2006)	Peak position
Canada (Canadian Digital Songs) (Billboard)	65
US Billboard Hot 100	83
US Pop 100	63

== Certification ==
Region	Certification	Certified units/sales
United States (RIAA)	Gold	500,000^{‡}
^{‡} Sales+streaming figures based on certification alone.
