= Pumpin' Up the Party =

"Pumpin' Up The Party"

Song by Hannah Montana

from the album Hannah Montana
- Released: October 24, 2006
- Genre: Teen pop; dance-pop
- Length: 3:09
- Label: Walt Disney
- Songwriter: Jamie Houston
- Producer: Jamie Houston

"Pumpin' Up the Party" is a song by fictional character Hannah Montana, recorded by American singer and actress Miley Cyrus for the soundtrack of the Disney Channel series Hannah Montana. The song was written and produced by Jaime Houston. It was released to Radio Disney as promotion for the series and the soundtrack. The song has teen pop and dance-pop influences.

In the United States, the song peaked at number eighty-one on the Billboard Hot 100 and within the top seventy on the Pop 100. Its appearance on the Billboard Hot 100 made Cyrus the first act to have six songs debut on the chart in the same week. A music video for "Pumpin' Up the Party" was taken from footage of a concert performance. Cyrus, dressed as Hannah Montana, performed the song during the Best of Both Worlds Tour.

== Background and composition ==
Due to the success of several tracks he wrote for the High School Musical soundtrack (2006), Walt Disney Records representatives contacted songwriter Jamie Houston to propose work for Hannah Montana. Houston accepted the proposal and solely penned "Pumpin' Up the Party" for the series' first soundtrack. A karaoke version appears on Disney's Karaoke Series: Hannah Montana (2007), while a remixed version appears on Hits Remixed (2008). The song first premiered on Radio Disney in order to promote the series and soundtrack.

"Pumpin' Up the Party" is pop song that lasts three minutes and nine seconds. Heather Phares of Allmusic described the song as a groove that is influenced by teen pop and dance-pop genres. "Pumpin' Up the Party" is set in common time and has a moderately fast tempo of 150 beats per minute. It is written in the key of E major and Cyrus's vocals span one octave, from A_{3} to B_{4}. The song follows the chord progression of E–G–A–C–D–C–D.

== Reception ==
Cyrus as Montana performs in the concert taping for the first season of Hannah Montana; it is used as the music video for "Pumpin' Up the Party".

=== Critical reception ===
Heather Phares of Allmusic disliked "Pumpin' Up the Party", saying it was a "slight stumble [...] that ends up going nowhere." She added that aside from the song, the Hannah Montana soundtrack did "a great job of showcasing [Cyrus's] charismatic vocals with strong melodies".

=== Chart performance ===
As it was not released as a single, "Pumpin' Up the Party" received exclusive airplay on Radio Disney, thus its chart appearances consisted mainly of digital downloads. Following the release of the Hannah Montana soundtrack, the song entered Billboard's Hot Digital Songs Chart at number 41, which led to an appearance on the Billboard Hot 100 on the week ending November 11, 2006. "Pumpin' Up the Party" debuted on the Billboard Hot 100 at its peak of 81, thus becoming one of the songs to make Cyrus the first act to have six songs debut on the Billboard Hot 100 in the same week. It was also one of the seven songs to make Cyrus the female act with the most songs charting in the same week. Both records were later duplicated by Taylor Swift. It dropped from the chart in the succeeding week. The song also peaked at number 62 on the now-defunct Pop 100 Chart.

== Live performances ==
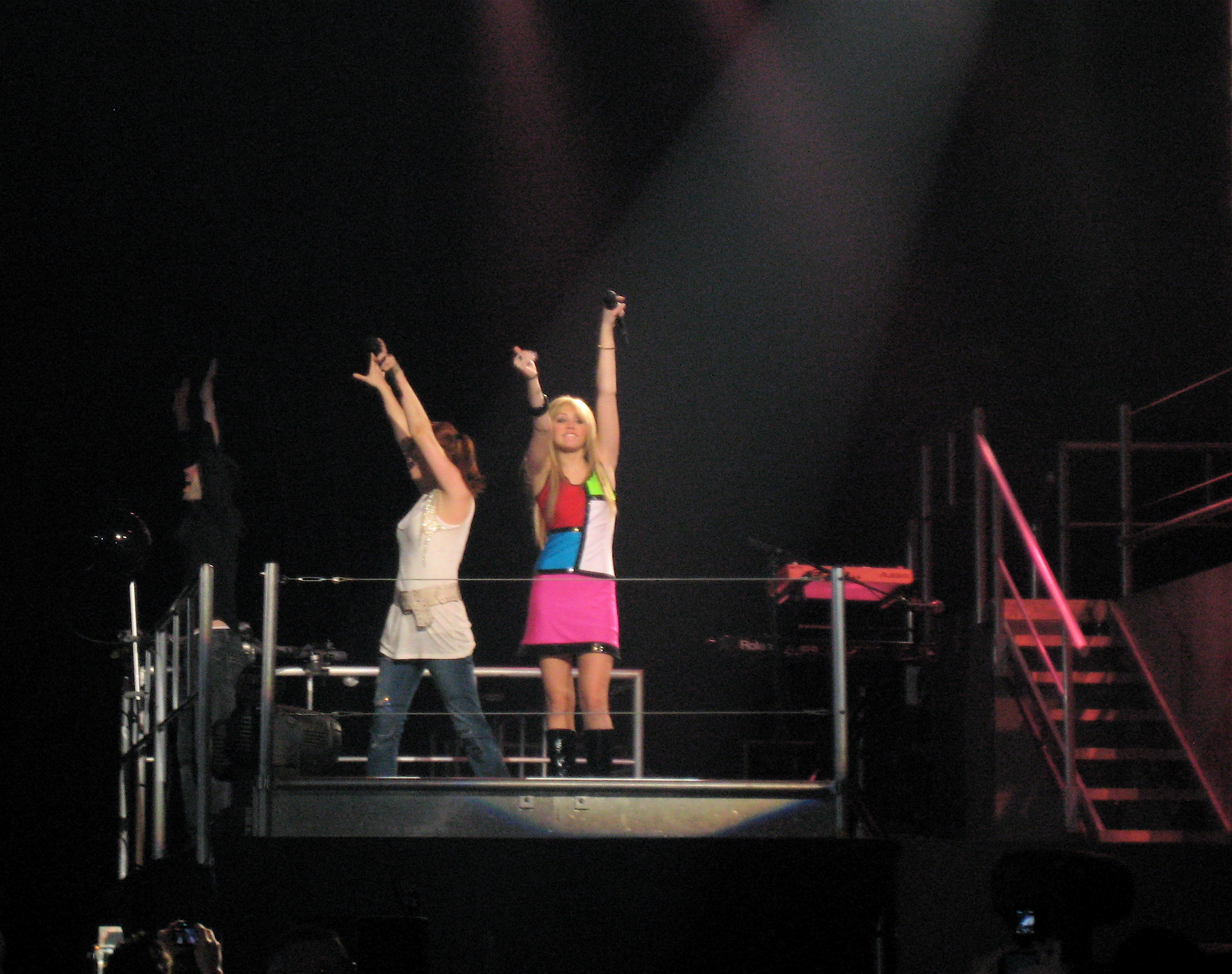
Cyrus performing "Pumpin Up the Party" on the Best of Both Worlds Tour.

Cyrus, as Montana, first performed "Pumpin' Up the Party", accompanied by six other songs from the soundtrack, at the concert taping for the first season of Hannah Montana. Cyrus is costumed in pink-polka dotted, black pajamas and slippers as backup dancers also dress in sleepwear. Simulating a sleepover, the performance commenced with Cyrus singing from a bed, where she engaged in a pillow fight with backup dancers, and later stood up to perform around the stage. The performance was later released as the song's music video on Disney Channel. Cyrus also performed the song on twenty dates in the fall of 2006, when she opened for the Cheetah Girls' 2006 and 2007 concert tour The Party's Just Begun Tour. On March 28, 2007, Cyrus appeared as Hannah Montana and performed the song for Hannah Montana: Live in London at Koko. "Pumpin' Up the Party" was part of the set list for her first headlining tour, the Best of Both Worlds Tour (2007–08). She performed the song at each venue during the tour, in character as Hannah Montana and wearing a pink sequined mini-dress and fuchsia tights to perform alongside numerous backup dancers.
At Walt Disney World's Magic Kingdom, beginning in February 2009, a version of the song has been used as the opening number and theme of the parade & dance party Move It! Shake It! Celebrate It!.

== Credits and Personnel ==
- Songwriting: Jamie Houston
- Production: Jamie Houston

== Charts ==
Chart (2006)	Peak position
U.S. Billboard Hot 100	81
U.S. Pop 100	62
