= If We Were a Movie =

Promotional single by Hannah Montana

from the album Hannah Montana
- A-side: "The Best of Both Worlds"
- Released: October 24, 2006
- Recorded: 2005
- Genre: Pop rock; bubblegum pop
- Length: 3:04
- Label: Walt Disney
- Songwriters: Jeannie Lurie; Holly Mathis
- Producer: Rock Mafia

"If We Were a Movie" is a song by fictional character Hannah Montana, recorded by American singer and actress Miley Cyrus for the soundtrack of the Disney Channel series Hannah Montana. The song was written by Jeannie Lurie and Holly Mathis, and was produced by Rock Mafia. It was released as a promotional single from the soundtrack. The song has teen pop influences.

In the United States, the song peaked at number forty-seven on the Billboard Hot 100 and within the top forty on the Pop 100. Its appearance on the Billboard Hot 100 made Cyrus the first act to have six songs debut on the chart in the same week. A music video for "If We Were a Movie" was taken from footage of a Hannah Montana Radio Disney concert performance.

The song was later re-recorded as a duet with fellow Disney Channel actor Corbin Bleu for the Hannah Montana 3 soundtrack album.

== Background and composition ==
Written by Jennie Lurie and Holly Mathis, and produced by Antonina Armato and Tim James, "If We Were a Movie" is a teen pop song that lasts three minutes and three seconds. Heather Phares of Allmusic considered "If We Were a Movie" a "clever" and "catchy" song, with a "sharper-than-average songwriting". It was released as a b-side to "The Best of Both Worlds" in foreign countries on February 20, 2007.

A karaoke version appears on Disney's Karaoke Series: Hannah Montana (2007), while a remixed version appears on Hits Remixed (2008). The song first premiered on Radio Disney in order to promote the series and soundtrack. The song was later released as a duet with Corbin Bleu on the third Hannah Montana soundtrack.

== Reception ==
As it was not released as a single in the United States, "If We Were a Movie" received exclusive airplay on Radio Disney, thus its chart appearances consisted mainly of digital downloads. Following the release of the Hannah Montana soundtrack, the song entered Billboard's Hot Digital Songs Chart at number twenty, which led to an appearance on the Billboard Hot 100 on the week ending November 11, 2006. "If We Were a Movie" debuted on the Billboard Hot 100 at its peak of forty-seven, thus becoming Cyrus as Montana's highest charting song from the album, and one of the songs to make Cyrus the first act to have six songs debut on the Billboard Hot 100 in the same week. It dropped from the chart in the succeeding week. The song also peaked at number thirty-eight on the now-defunct Pop 100 Chart.

== Promotion ==
Three different live performances have been prominently used for promotional music videos. Cyrus as Montana debuted the song at Walt Disney World Resort's Typhoon Lagoon on June 23, 2006. The video was aired on Disney Channel, along with performances of "The Best of Both Worlds", "I Got Nerve" and "This is the Life". Another live performance from Radio Disney's 10th Birthday Concert was also used as a music video on Disney Channel. The third live performance was on The Cheetah Girls' The Party's Just Begun Tour and also served as a music video.

== Credits and Personnel ==
- Vocals: Hannah Montana
- Songwriting: Jeannie Lurie, Holly Mathis
- Production: Antonina Armato, Tim James

== Charts ==
Chart (2006)	Peak position
U.S. Billboard Hot 100	47
U.S. Billboard Pop 100	38

== Certification ==
Region	Certification	Certified units/sales
United States (RIAA)	Platinum	1,000,000^{‡}
^{‡} Sales+streaming figures based on certification alone.
