= I Got Nerve =

Song by Hannah Montana

from the album Hannah Montana
- Released: October 24, 2006
- Recorded: 2005
- Genre: New wave; pop-punk
- Length: 3:05
- Label: Walt Disney
- Songwriters: Jennie Lurie; Ken Hauptman; Aruna Abrams
- Producer: Rock Mafia

"I Got Nerve" is a song by fictional character Hannah Montana, recorded by American singer and actress Miley Cyrus for the soundtrack of the Disney Channel series Hannah Montana. "I Got Nerve" was produced by Rock Mafia and its songwriters Jennie Lurie, Ken Hauptman and Aruna Abrams. The song was released on October 24, 2006.

In the United States, the song peaked at number 67 on the Billboard Hot 100 and within the top 60 on the Pop 100. Its appearance on the Billboard Hot 100 made Cyrus the first act to have six songs debut on the chart in the same week. The song was also certified gold by the Recording Industry Association of America (RIAA) in March 2023. A music video for "I Got Nerve" was taken from footage of a Montana's Radio Disney concert performance.

== Background and composition ==
Written by Jennie Lurie, Ken Hauptman, and Aruna Abrams, and produced by Antonina Armato and Tim James, "I Got Nerve" lasts three minutes and five seconds.

A karaoke version appears on Disney's Karaoke Series: Hannah Montana (2007).

== Reception ==
=== Critical reception ===
Heather Phares of Allmusic liked the song and called it a "spunky, new-wavey girl power anthem".

=== Chart performance ===
As not released as a single in the United States, "I Got Nerve" received exclusive airplay on Radio Disney, thus its chart appearances consisted mainly of digital downloads. Following the release of the Hannah Montana soundtrack, the song entered Billboard's Hot Digital Songs Chart at number thirty-one, which led to an appearance on the Billboard Hot 100 on the week ending November 11, 2006.

"I Got Nerve" debuted on the Billboard Hot 100 at its peak of sixty-seven, thus becoming Cyrus as Montana's highest charting song from the album, and one of the songs to make Cyrus the first act to have six songs debut on the Billboard Hot 100 in the same week. It dropped from the chart in the succeeding week. The song also peaked at number fifty-one on the now-defunct Pop 100 Chart.

== Music videos and Live performances ==
Three different live performances have been prominently used for promotional music videos. Cyrus as Montana debuted the song at Walt Disney World Resort's Typhoon Lagoon on June 23, 2006. The video was aired on Disney Channel, along with performances of "The Best of Both Worlds", "This is the Life" and "If We Were a Movie". Another live performance from Radio Disney's 10th Birthday Concert was also used as a music video on Disney Channel. The third live performance was on The Cheetah Girls' The Party's Just Begun Tour and also served as a music video.

The song was also performed during Cyrus' first headline tour, Best of Both Worlds Tour.

== Charts ==
Chart (2006)	Peak position
U.S. Billboard Hot 100	67
U.S. Billboard Pop 100	51

== Certification ==
Region	Certification	Certified units/sales
United States (RIAA)	Gold	500,000^{‡}
^{‡} Sales+streaming figures based on certification alone.
