= Best of Both Worlds Tour =

2007–08 concert tour by Miley Cyrus

- Continental tour by Miley Cyrus
- Official promotional poster for the tour
- Location: North America
- Associated album: Hannah Montana; Hannah Montana 2: Meet Miley Cyrus
- Start date: October 18, 2007
- End date: March 9, 2008
- Legs: 1
- No. of shows: 71
- Box office: $70 million ($104.68 million in 2025 dollars)

Miley Cyrus concert chronology
- Hannah Montana: Live in London (2007); Best of Both Worlds Tour (2007–2008); Wonder World Tour (2009)

Best of Both Worlds Tour was the debut concert tour by American singer Miley Cyrus. The tour was held in support of the double-disc Hannah Montana 2: Meet Miley Cyrus (2007), which consisted of the soundtrack to Hannah Montana's second season and her debut studio album. It initiated in October 2007 and concluded in January 2008, visiting cities in the United States and Canada. The tour was promoted by AEG Live and Buena Vista Concerts. Labelmates the Jonas Brothers, Aly & AJ, and Everlife each served as opening act during the tour. One dollar from each ticket sold was donated to the City of Hope National Medical Center, an organization devoted to the fight against cancer. The Best of Both Worlds Tour raised over US $2 million for the organization.

The Best of Both Worlds Tour was created by Kenny Ortega and Michael Cotten to be video intensive and was meant to differentiate Cyrus from Hannah Montana as a performer. The show had Cyrus performing first under character, as Hannah Montana. She then performed a duet with the opening act, which continued performing an interlude of songs. For the latter half of the duet, a body double was used to facilitate the transition from Hannah Montana to herself. Videos online caused many fans to become outraged and question whether Cyrus lip-synched on the tour. Her representatives later issued a statement that denied the allegations and stated the reasons for the body double's usage. The fast-paced concert had six segments, divided equally between each persona.

The tour received generally positive responses from critics, some who complimented Cyrus' vocal skills and onstage presence and preferred the Hannah Montana set over Cyrus'. The tour was commercially successful, grossing over $54 million. At the 2008 Billboard Touring Awards, it won the "Breakthrough Artist" award.

A three-dimensional film, Hannah Montana and Miley Cyrus: Best of Both Worlds Concert, was released to American cinema in February 2008. The film received an overwhelming commercial response, grossing a total of $70.6 million worldwide and setting numerous records, including once being the highest-grossing concert film of all time. Critical response was generally positive to mixed. When televised for the first time on Disney Channel, Hannah Montana & Miley Cyrus: Best of Both Worlds Concert was watched by over 5.9 million viewers. A live album was released as a soundtrack for the film, Best of Both Worlds Concert, with recordings from the same concerts was released in March 2008.

== Background ==
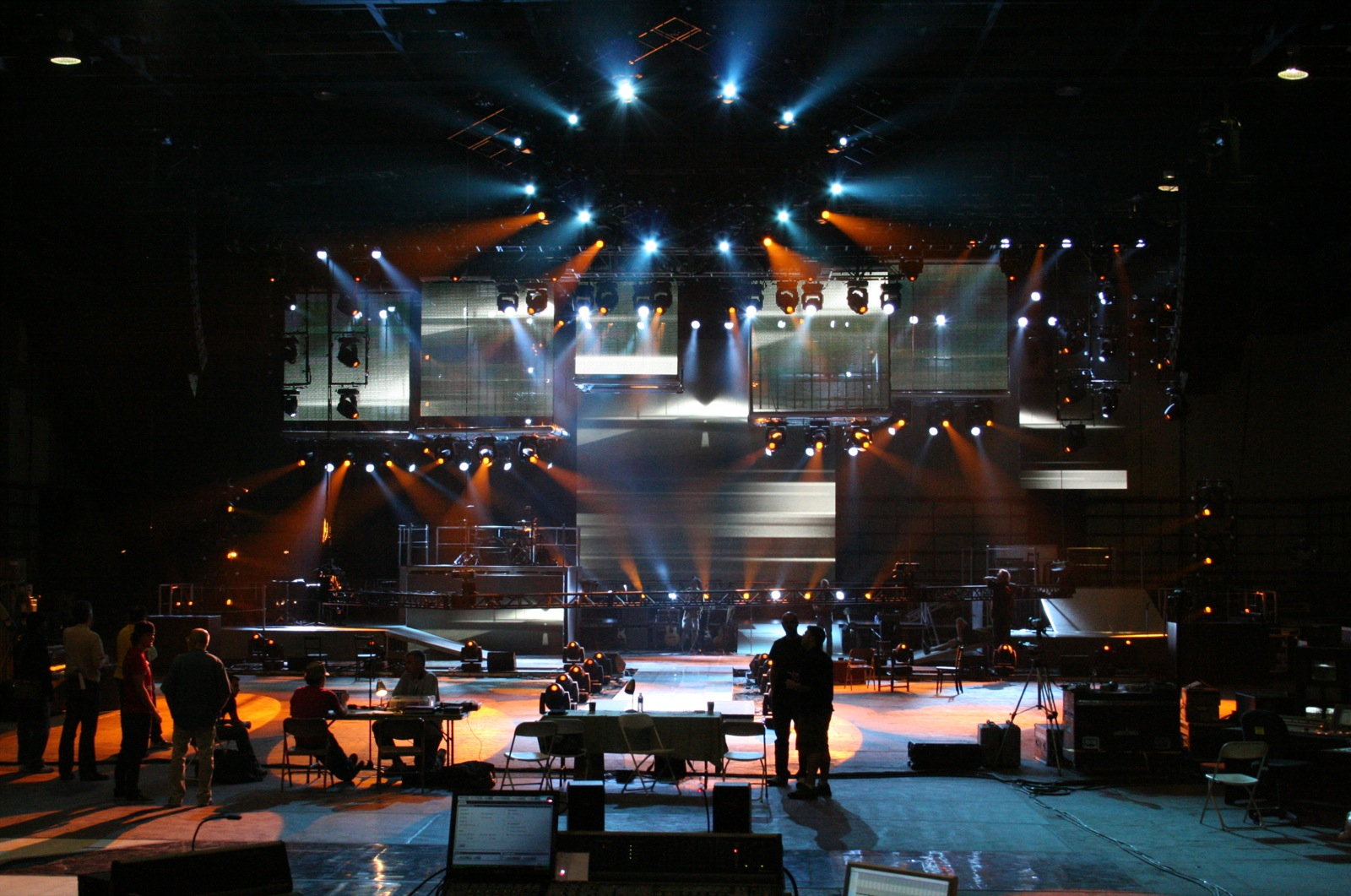
The stage being set up before showtime.

In 2006, Cyrus served as opening act on twenty dates of The Cheetah Girls' concert tour The Party's Just Begun Tour, performing solely as Hannah Montana. In June 2007, the singer released the double-disc album Hannah Montana 2: Meet Miley Cyrus. The first disc, Hannah Montana 2, of the album was Hannah Montana's second season soundtrack, while the second disc, Meet Miley Cyrus, was Cyrus' debut studio album. In order to promote the album, Cyrus decided to embark on her first headlining concert tour, the Best of Both Worlds Tour, where she performed both under character, as Hannah Montana, and as herself for the first time.

The concert tour was being discussed by executives as early as January 2007. It was announced on August 8, 2007 via press release. It was confirmed that the tour would be promoted by AEG Live and Buena Vista Concerts, a division of The Walt Disney Company. It also featured American band and labelmates the Jonas Brothers as opening act. The tour would expand throughout North America, from October 18, 2007 in St. Louis, Missouri to January 9, 2008 in Albany, New York, with a total of fifty-four dates; fifty-three of which were in the United States and one which was in Canada. In October 2007, another date was annexed in order to meet demand. In December 2007, a fourteen-date extension of the tour was announced, with American duo Aly & A.J. opening seven of them; the opening act for the remaining dates was yet be announced. The extension featured new opening acts because the Jonas Brothers pulled out to record their then-forthcoming album A Little Bit Longer (2008). Subsequently, in the same month, one final date was annexed, and the American band Everlife was announced to as the final opening act. One dollar from each ticket purchased was donated to the City of Hope National Medical Center, a center dedicated to the prevention, treatment and research for the cure of cancer. In total, the Best of Both Worlds Tour raised over US $2 million for the center.

== Development ==
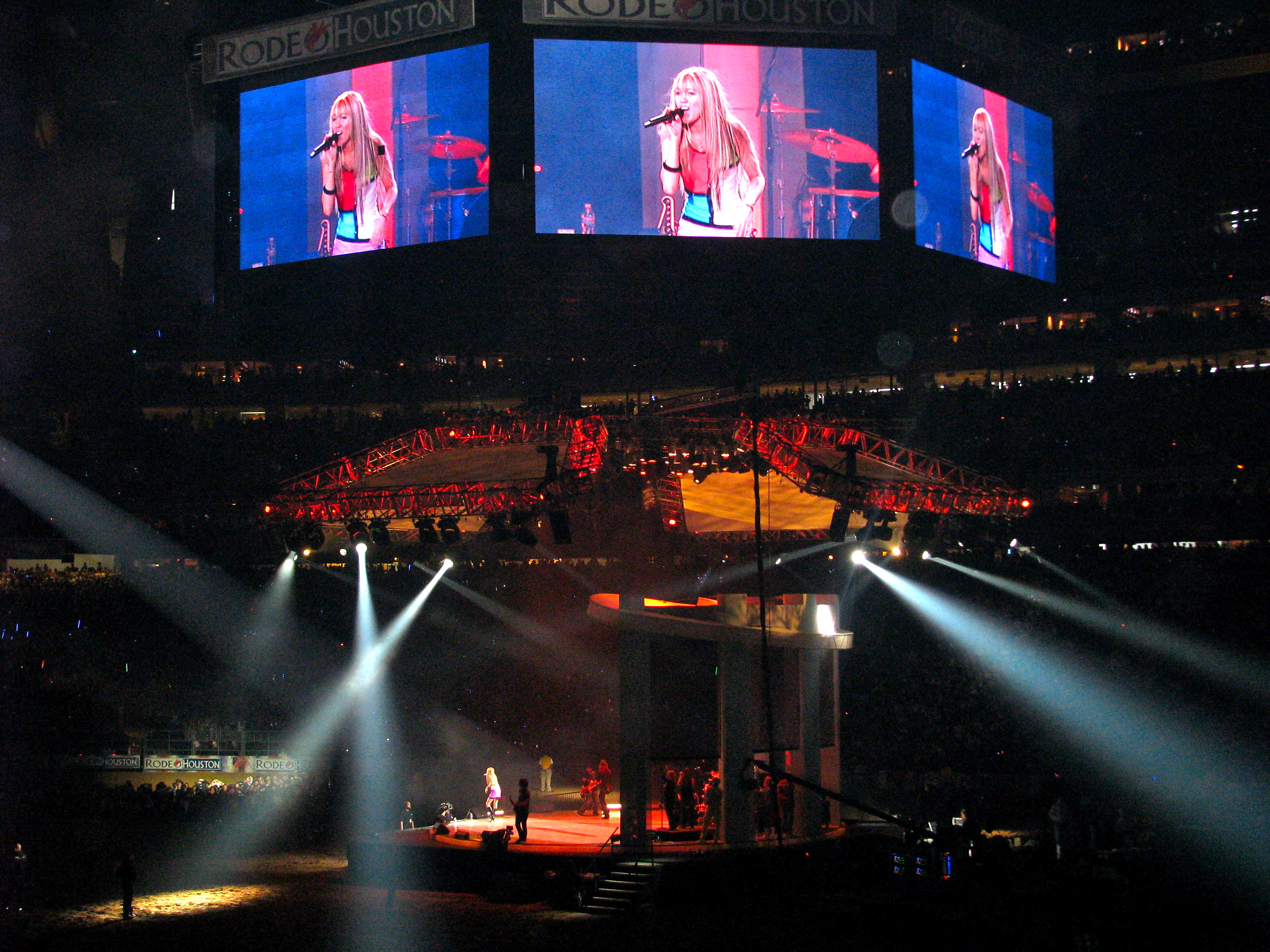
Cyrus performing "Pumpin' Up the Party" as Hannah Montana on the final concert of the Best of Both Worlds Tour on March 9, 2008.

The tour was titled Best of Both Worlds Tour after the song of the same name, which was the theme to Hannah Montana and was released on the series' first soundtrack. The title was chosen because of how the concert alternates between Cyrus performing as Hannah Montana and herself. She described the tour to differentiate the two according to their respective styles and depict how one girl was able to have two sides to her. She said the most notable difference between the two characters was the style of music, rather than physical appearance. According to her, Hannah Montana was direct pop music, while her own style was more rock music-oriented and included real-life scenarios set to tunes. Cyrus rehearsed for the tour simultaneous to filming the final episodes for the second season of Hannah Montana from September to October 2007.

Kenny Ortega, a common collaborator with The Walt Disney Company at the time, was hired as the tour's director and main choreographer. Ortega, along with set designer Michael Cotten, assembled an experienced personnel and developed the show, which was made fairly simple because Cyrus did not feel confident enough as a vocalist to perform stunts and use props while singing. Therefore, the focus was turned to video. Cotten envisioned the set to be "an interactive mobile kaleidoscope of flash and style", a conceptualization that involved a massive amount of video. Nineteen individual LED video screens were located throughout the stage. Four high definition V9 LED video screens served as walls surrounding the main stage. Five Barco MiTrix cubes, which consisted of three LED panels that faced towards the audience and one supporting panel that faced the stage, were suspended by rigs throughout the stage. Nocturne Productions partnered with equipment supplier Video Equipment Rentals (VER) to accomplish the design. The lightweight and adaptability of the V9 LED screens allowed for designers to add more lighting elements than in most shows at the time.

Video content director George Elizando and video engineer Steven Davis controlled the video surfaces using a Pinnacle i9000 switcher and an expanded Vista Systems Spyder system. Graphics on the LED walls were fed from a custom video playback system that incorporated three Green Hippo media servers; some of the video content was filmed during rehearsals and were meant for Cyrus to interact with onstage. Visual magnification was executed through the usage of Ikegami Tsushinki HL-45 cameras and multiple strategically located point-of-view cameras, in order to cover the show from every angle. Extensive amounts of teamwork was needed to set up the complex video system at each venue, particularly for weekend daytime performances, as they had less time. Mark Woody, Steve "Bone" Gray, Justin McLean, and Dane Mustola set up the video structures, while Evan Huff and crew chief Eric Geiger built the video thrust into the audience and installed the live cameras. "Thanks to these talented designers a show commensurate with Hannah's popularity has been created", said Paul Becher, co-CEO of Nocturne Productions. For audio, Cyrus used Sennheiser's MD 5235 dynamic capsule atop the SKM 5200 wireless handheld transmitter nightly. Sixteen channels of Sennheiser G2 wireless monitors were programmed to ensure that performers could hear what was being played amidst fervid screams from the audience. Sennheiser 500 series wireless guitar and bass systems were also used.

== Concert synopsis ==
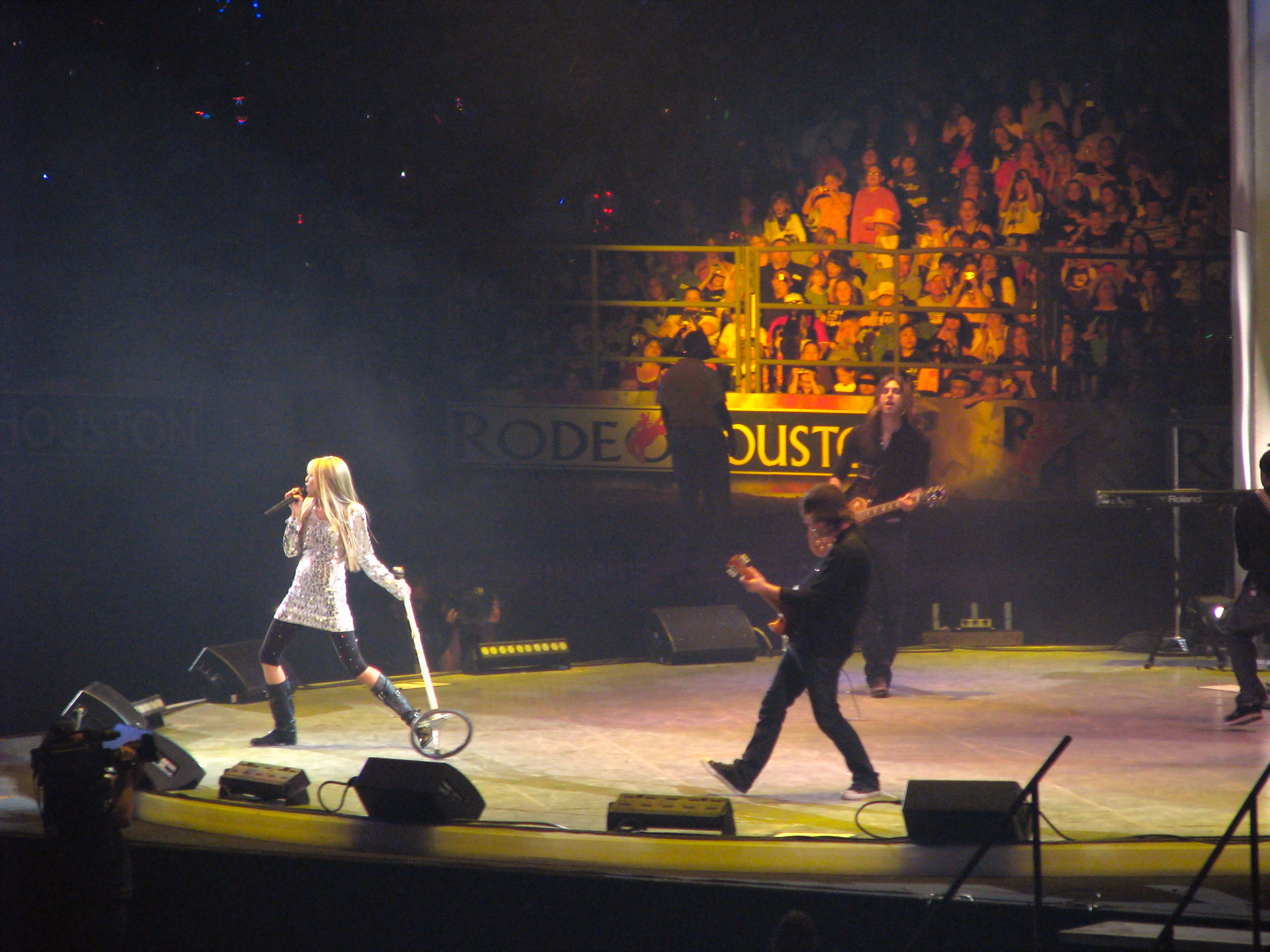
Cyrus opening the show as Hannah Montana with "Rock Star" during the Houston Livestock Show and Rodeo concert on March 9, 2008.

The main show started with Cyrus descending onto the stage in a neon pink cube that bore a digital image of her silhouette, as pink fireworks were fired behind her. Donning a long, sequined, cheetah and black-striped dress and cardigan, sparkling black leggings, black boots, and the blonde Hannah Montana wig, she began to perform the concert's opening number, "Rock Star". In continuation, Cyrus was joined by multiple backup dancers to perform dance routines for "Life's What You Make It". Removing the cardigan, she concluded the segment with "Just Like You". Still costumed as Hannah Montana, Cyrus reappeared from the back of the stage, wearing sparkly blue denim jeans, a white tank top, a blue denim vest, and shiny silver tie; she performed "Old Blue Jeans" among female backup dancers and "Nobody's Perfect" roaming the stage alone while scenes from her hit tv show, Hannah Montana, were played on the big screens. The next segment began with the performance of "Pumpin' Up the Party", where Cyrus dressed with a pink and purple sequined mini-dress, fuchsia ad violet leggings and maroon boots and dancers wore 1960s-inspired attires while performing calisthenics. The segment continued with "I Got Nerve", which required participation and elaborate routines on behalf of the dancers, and a duet with the opening act. While they served as opening act, "We Got the Party" was performed as a duet with the Jonas Brothers. She annexed a pink and purple trench coat to her attire and performed with the Jonas Brothers, who also played electric guitars. At one point of the performance, Cyrus disappeared to be replaced by a body double who completed the performance. While Aly & A.J. and Everlife served as opening acts, a postmodern cover of Kiss' "Rock and Roll All Nite" (1975) was performed by them and Cyrus wore a geometric-patterned cocktail dress. Afterwards, the opening act performed an interlude of several songs. Backup singer Kay Hanley then introduces Miley Cyrus.

After removing the wig, Cyrus then reappeared to perform eight more songs as herself. She emerged from the bottom of the runaway to perform "Start All Over". She was costumed by studded black jeans with chains attached to the waist, a white tank top, a black leather vest and a matching glove. She roamed throughout the stage, kicking over the microphone stand and banging her head. "Good and Broken" and "See You Again", where Cyrus removed the vest and was joined by multiple backup dancers, rounded off the show's fourth segment. She returned to the stage in a fuchsia bustier and short, black ruffled skirt to perform "Let's Dance", where she performed Latin-influenced choreography with backup dancers, and "Right Here". Prior to Cyrus re-entering the stage for the sixth segment, backup singers sang a reworked version of Toni Basil's "Mickey" (1982) that replaced the word "Mickey" with "Miley". Cyrus, costumed in a pink tank top, a plaid miniskirt and sneakers with high-knee socks, performed "East Northumberland High", amid backup dancers dressed as skateboarders and football players. Adding a black jacket, she sings "G.N.O. (Girl's Night Out)" with female dancers as her backup singers and concluded the main concert with the theme to Hannah Montana, "The Best of Both Worlds", a song credited to her alter ego. The latter had Cyrus interacting with video that depicted Hannah Montana and ended with the firing of confetti and fireworks. Sporadically throughout the Best Both Worlds Tour, Cyrus returned on stage wearing a white tank top and denim jeans for the performance of a one-song encore, which was either "I Miss You" or "Ready, Set, Don't Go", a duet with her father Billy Ray Cyrus. Both songs were performed in an acoustic setting, without dancers or special effects. The prior had Cyrus performing acoustic guitar herself, while the latter had her father doing so.

== Critical reception ==
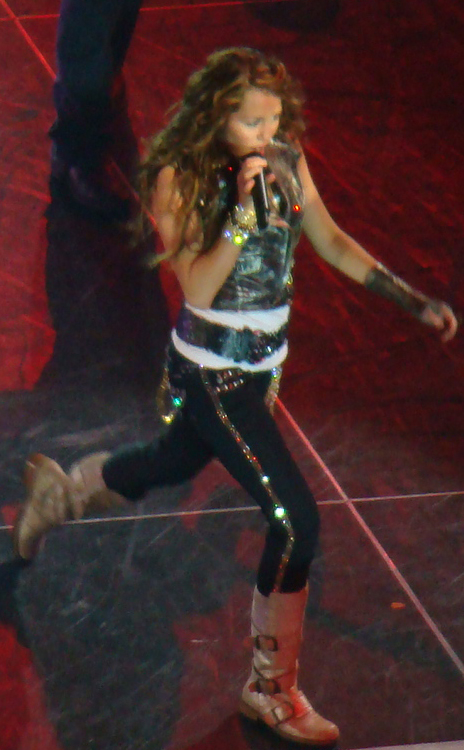
Cyrus initiating the segment as herself with "Start All Over"

Chris William of Entertainment Weekly graded the show a B+ and commented that, despite her age (at the time fourteen), Cyrus was a determined and likable performer who was able to command the stage the entire show. He continued to compare her to Britney Spears and Avril Lavigne stylistically and musically, respectively. Jim Abbott of the Orlando Sentinel believed the Best of Both Worlds Tour was as entertaining as concerts performed by Spears or the Backstreet Boys, adding that the show's quality made past Hilary Duff concerts "look like something in a mall food court." However, Abbott also stated that Cyrus was unable to duplicate the energy of Hannah Montana. Kelefa Sanneh of The New York Times expected to be let down by the concert after the commotion and hype built for it, but was not. She said, "The show was terrific: a two-hour sugar rush and one long challenge to fans, who had to keep up with Ms. Cyrus's hectic pace." Regarding Cyrus, Sanneh stated she was a likable singer, being able to emphasize on certain words and that her demeanor on stage portrayed her as a "hard-working, sweet-natured troublemaker. There's something slightly disruptive about her bright smile [...] And she brings a welcome hint of chaos to everything she does." J. Freedom du Lac of The Washington Post described the concert as "a nearly 90-minute blast of pop in which the charismatic Cyrus – who complained that she wasn't feeling well – commanded the stage with confidence, performing with a particular swagger." Mikael Wood of the Los Angeles Times described the show to be operated at a "frenzied fever pitch" and be only appealing to children, confusing adults with its presentation.

J. Edawrd Keyes of Newsday said that producers were able to deliver a concert "that was the visual and sonic equivalent of washing down a pound of sugar with 27 cans of soda." Keyes added that, despite Cyrus' charisma, it was evident the show and the dual-persona arrangement (considering that there were no major divergences between them) was an evident strategy to extend marketing and receive more profits. Peter Hartlaub of the San Francisco Chronicle believed Cyrus was a fair singer and commented, "It was relatively wholesome, musically tolerable and certainly had plenty of production value. Some adults may have walked away wondering what the big fuss was about, but none of the kids looked the least bit disappointed." Jane Stevenson of the Canadian Online Explorer noted the differences between Hannah Montana and Cyrus, stating that Cyrus was the "marginally tougher cookie of the two singers" and that audiences received two concerts for the price of one. An uncredited review from The Palm Beach Post stated, "Both halves [of the concert] were enjoyable and lively, set apart by Cyrus’ preternaturally assured stage presence, in and out of the wig." It also stated that the Hannah Montana set was more satisfying due to the quality of the songs and more energy. Geoff Edgers of The Boston Globe wrote, "Of course, most of the mainly tweener fans in the arena weren't splitting [...] musical hairs. They ate up the spectacle of the show, with its costume changes, giant video screens, and sparklers."

== Commercial performance ==
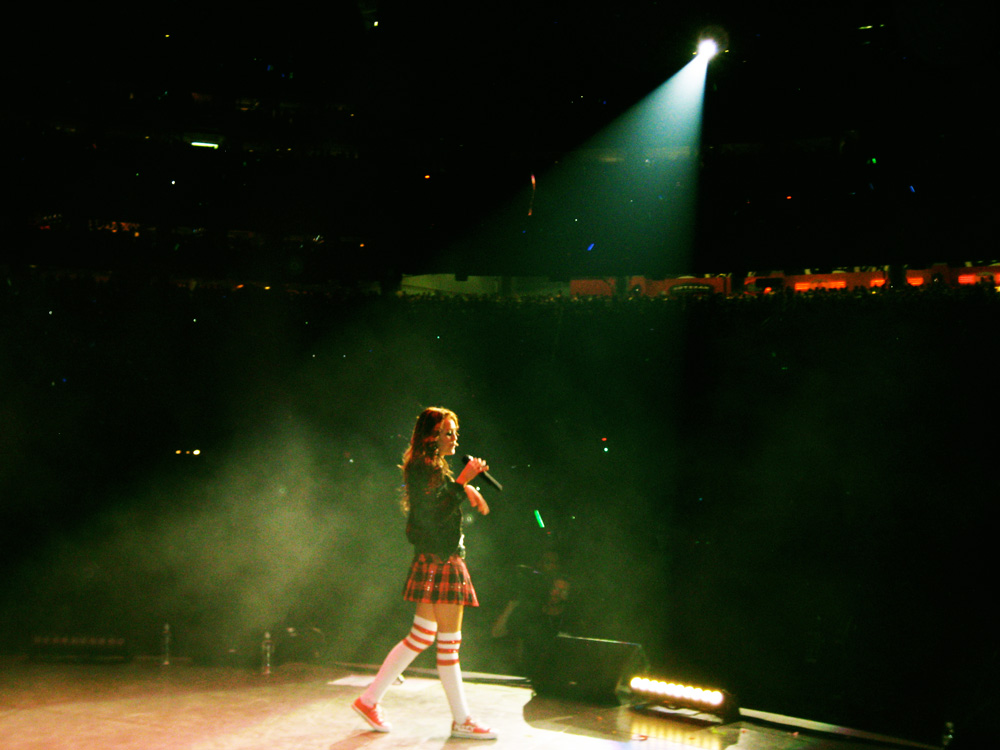
Cyrus performing "G.N.O. (Girl's Night Out)" in Houston.

The Best of Both Worlds Tour was financially successful and was able to sell an abundance of shows throughout the United States in record times. The December 6, 2007 concert at the Van Andel Arena in Grand Rapids, Michigan sold out within eight minutes, the third-fastest sell-out in the arena's history. Numerous other concerts, such as the one held on December 1, 2007 at the Sprint Center in Kansas City, Missouri and December 11, 2007 at the Nationwide Arena in Columbus, Ohio, sold out within approximately twelve and fifteen minutes, respectively. "Absolutely every show sold out within the same amount of time. Whether you were in Moline or Omaha or New York or Los Angeles, it sold out in minutes", stated Debra Rathwell, senior vice president of AEG Live. In total, the Best of Both Worlds Tour had a total attendance of approximately one million people and grossed over US $54 million, according to Billboard Boxscore, becoming the highest-grossing concert tour for a new act in 2007 and 2008. The record was recognized with the award for Breakthrough Act at the 2008 Billboard Touring Awards.

== Controversies ==
=== Ticket scalpers ===
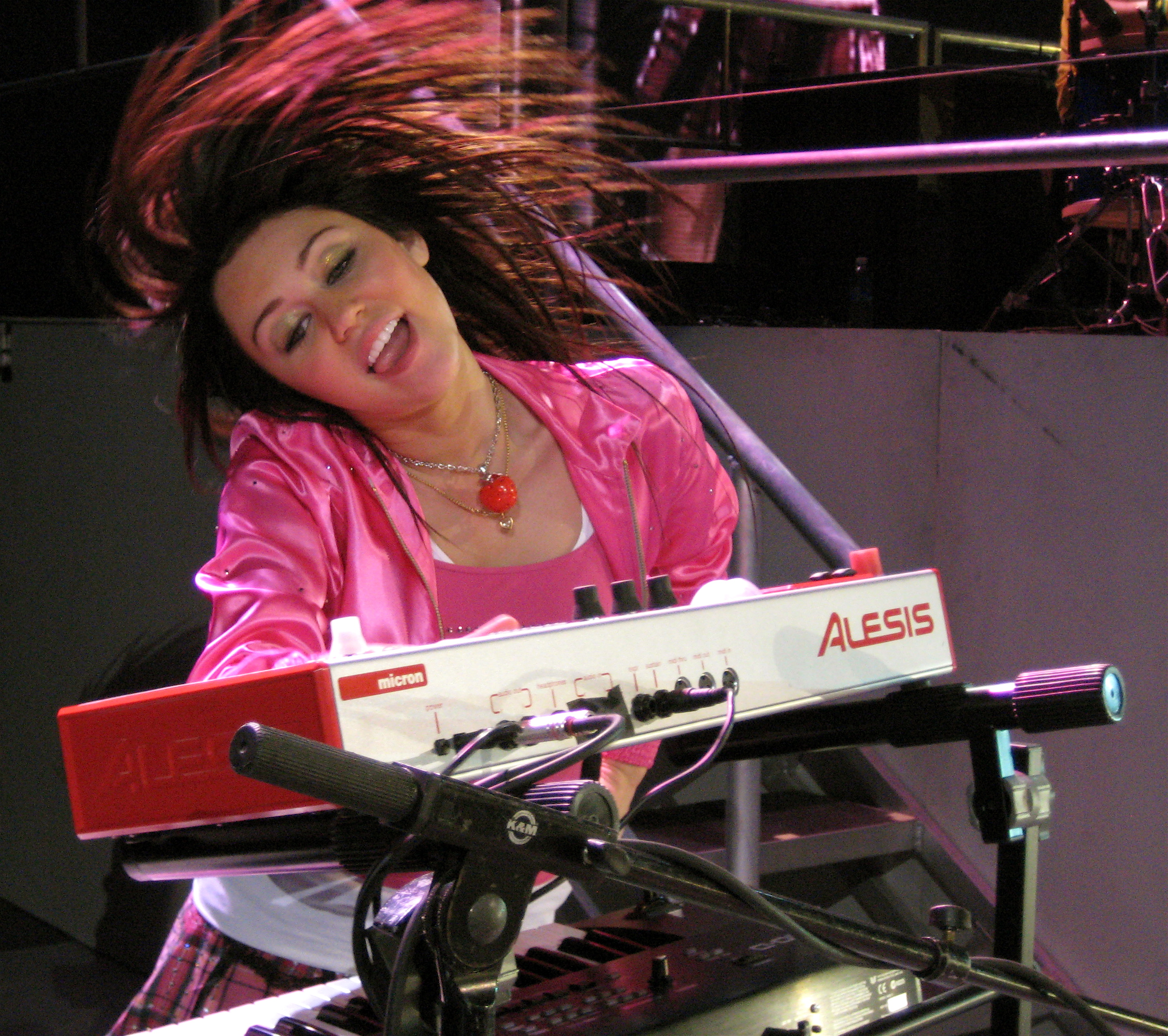
Cyrus performing the final song, "The Best of Both Worlds", on the tour

Tickets for the Best of Both Worlds Tour sold out quite rapidly. Nevertheless, ticket scalping was one of the primary reasons for it. Many tickets were immediately found for purchase on secondary markets, such as eBay or StubHub, selling for well over the face value of the tickets. Broker prices ranged from $350 to $2,000 for the tickets originally sold for $29 to $66. The shortage of tickets for the tour became so pronounced it gained national attention, with parents frequently expressing their outrage, discontent, and disappointment on behalf of their children. Vice president of Ticketmaster, Joe Freeman commented, "Hell hath no fury like the parent of a child throwing a tantrum. People who have been in this business for a long time are watching what's happening, and they say there hasn't been a demand of this level or intensity since The Beatles or Elvis [Presley]." In an isolated incident, a girl unable to afford an expensive surgery sold her Best of Both Worlds Tour concert tickets to pay for said surgery. Debra Rathwell, senior vice president of AEG Live said the tickets were priced and sold as fairly as possible and assured there was no conspiracy between those who handled the tour and brokers. "We do everything in our power to stop brokers from getting tickets, but it's impossible", she concluded. However, some brokers denied the allegations of purchasing most tickets for the shows. Brian Posey, owner of The Ticket Machine, an online broker based in East Lansing, Michigan, commented, "I've never seen this as far as availability for any show. It's never been that hard to get tickets for us. You don't see seats anywhere. Parents shouldn't blame brokers for snapping up loads of tickets." He continued to complain that the company was only able to purchase 28 tickets, while they usually averaged hundreds of tickets for hot tours.

Investigations were held in various states, including Arkansas, Michigan, and Missouri, which led to lawsuits that accused brokers of illegally reselling tickets from the Best of Both Worlds Tour. "When you allow the hijacking of the market, it's literally the worst of both worlds. You get charged too much, and there's no access for the locals", said Missouri Attorney General Jay Nixon. Numerous ticket brokers accessed tickets prior to fans as a result of a software program by RMG Technologies Inc, which permitted its clients to circumvent Ticketmaster.com's CAPTCHA access controls, and use the copyrighted website in a manner that violated the site's "Terms of Use". Ticketmaster took legal action against RMG Technologies via the United States District Court for the Central District of California, claiming that the developed software for ticket brokers illegally "allows them to cut in line". RMG Technologies representative denied the allegations and said they should not be held accountable because Ticketmaster is getting still paid for the tickets. "This may be the only time in history that any seller sued its customers for paying them too much money", the attorney for RMG Technologies wrote in court documents.

In November 2007, Kerry Inman, a woman from New Jersey, filed a lawsuit against Cyrus' official fan club, MileyWorld, for not complying with terms. Memberships claimed fans subscribed to MileyWorld were supposed to be given priority for seats. While the site never guaranteed ticket availability, it claimed that members who logged on shortly after tickets became available would have a good opportunity to purchase tickets. "They deceptively lured thousands of individuals into purchasing memberships into the Miley Cyrus Fan Club. The scenario has been replayed thousands, if not tens of thousands of times over the past few months", said the woman's attorney. Randy Philips, CEO of AEG Live, revealed the logical solution to all the tumult surrounding the Best of Both Worlds Tour, which he and Cyrus herself both longed for, was to add more shows, but was made impossible because Cyrus was already scheduled to film Hannah Montana: The Movie in early 2008. Instead, the lawsuit was responded with the addition of a total of 45,000 extra seats for the last 21 shows of the tour, which were offered for a limited time to MileyWorld subscribers.

More seats, radio contests, tickets auctions, and other contests were offered so fans could attend concerts. One contest had participants writing an essay about an event that impacted them the most to win a makeover that included a Hannah Montana wig, flight for four to Albany, New York, and four tickets to the January 9, 2008 concert held at the Times Union Center in Albany. The winner, a 6-year-old girl from Garland, Texas, had won with an essay stating the girl's father had died on April 17, 2007 in a roadside bombing in the Iraq War. However, the girl's mother, Priscilla Ceballos, later admitted that the essay and the military information she provided about her daughter's father were untrue. "We did the essay and that's what we did to win. We did whatever we could do to win, but when [Robyn Caulfield] asked me if this essay is true, I said 'No, this essay is not true,'" Ceballos said. The prizes were awarded to the runner up. The mishap garnered much attention from the media because it exemplified parents' desperation to please their children.

=== Body double ===
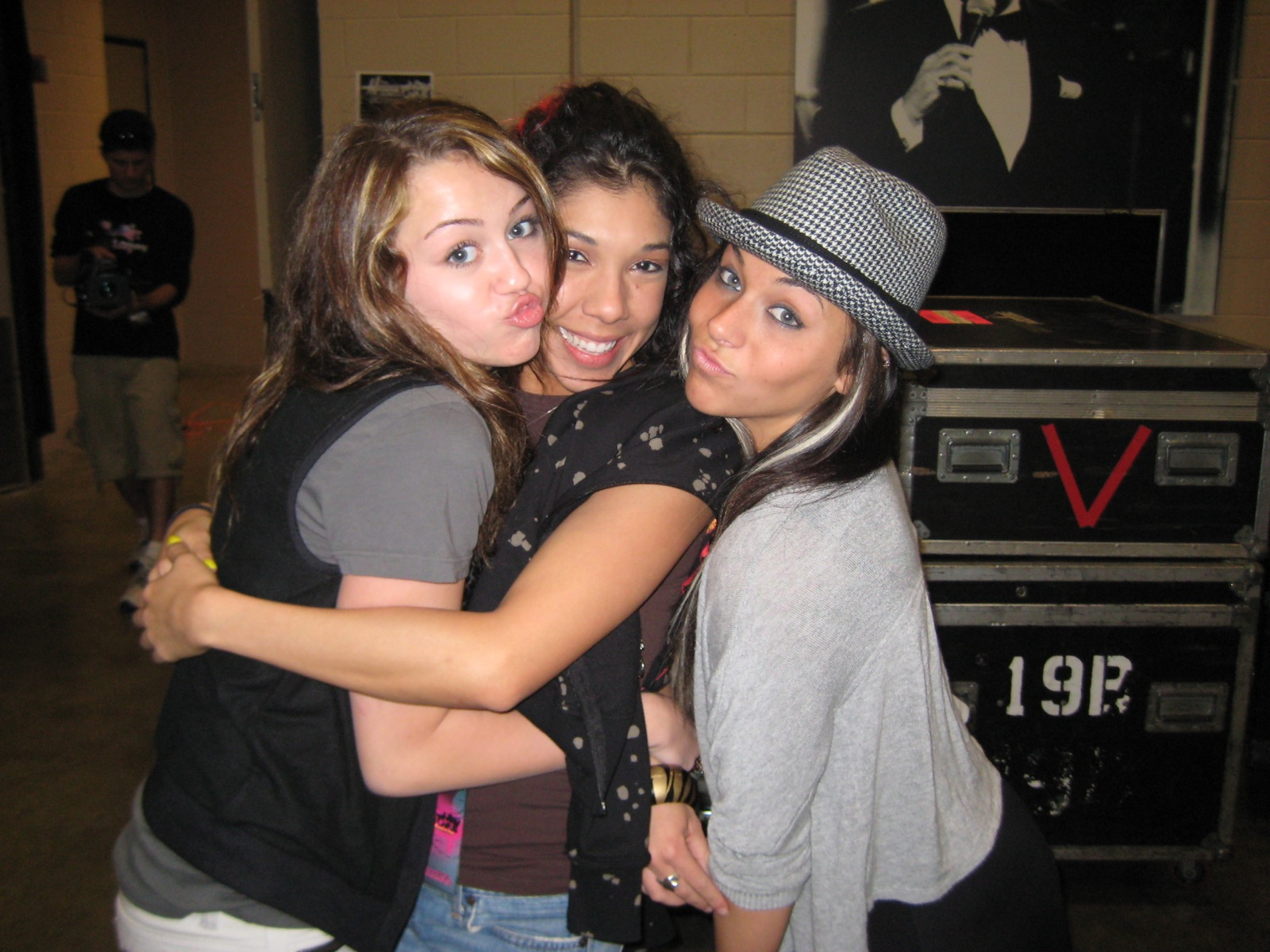
Cyrus (left) with backup dancers Ashlee Nino (center) and Mandy Jiroux (right). Nino was used as a body double during the tour.

In January 2008, numerous videos capturing the change from Cyrus to the body double during the performance of "We Got the Party" surfaced on the Internet. The videos showed how, during the song's bridge, backup dancers crowded her as a crew member covered Cyrus with a sheet and ushered her into a trap door and, through the adjacent side, a body double exited. She wore the same wardrobe as Cyrus and used the blonde wig and large glasses to obscure her face. Furthermore, live cameras barely captured her and did not film close-ups as she danced, ran hectically, and lip-synched the rest of "We Got the Party". Numerous fans and critics questioned whether Cyrus lip-synched the entire show during the Best of Both Worlds Tour.

On January 11, 2008, Cyrus' publicist confirmed that the videos were legitimate and that the body double, backup dancer Ashlee Nino, was being used throughout all stops of the Best of Both Worlds Tour. PMK Public Relations issued a statement that explained the body double's purpose:

To help speed the transition from Hannah to Miley, there is a production element during the performance of 'We Got the Party' incorporating a body double for Miley. After Hannah has completed the featured verse on the duet with the Jonas Brothers, a body double appears approximately one to two minutes prior to the end of the song in order to allow Miley to remove the Hannah wig and costume and transform into Miley for her solo set. Other than during this very brief transitional moment in the show, Miley performs live during the entirety of both the Hannah and Miley segments of the concert.

Cyrus later explained that it usually took over an hour and half to transition from Miley to Hannah and vice versa on the set of the television series, while on tour it took approximately two minutes. With the additional time, Cyrus was able to rest briefly, drink water, and prepare for the remainder of the show.

== Broadcast and recordings ==
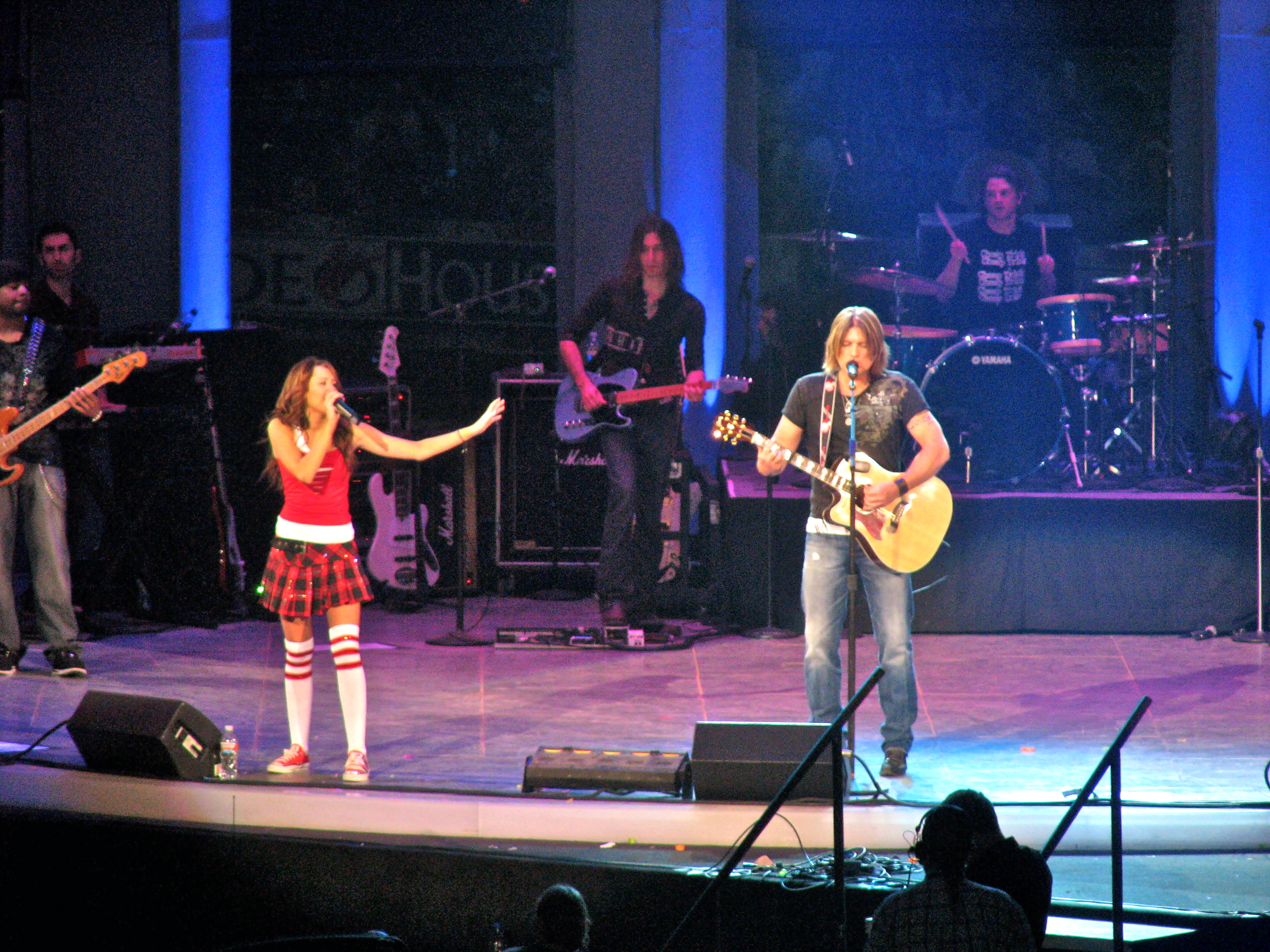
Cyrus sometimes performed "Ready, Set, Don't Go" with her father, Billy Ray, as an encore.

The concert held on October 18, 2007 in Salt Lake City was filmed for a Disney Digital 3D release, a group of three-dimensional films distributed by Walt Disney Pictures. The film, entitled Hannah Montana & Miley Cyrus: Best of Both Worlds Concert, was directed by Bruce Hendricks and produced by Art Repola. The film compiled some of the show's performances, along with backstage footage. Cyrus said Hannah Montana & Miley Cyrus: Best of Both Worlds Concert was made for individuals who did not attend a concert during the tour due to ticket scalping. She continued, "This is like better than front row. You could reach out and feel like you can touch my hand, you could see me right then, right there, right in front of you, which is so fun." It was released on February 1, 2008 in American cinemas, with an intended span of one week at theaters. The film was released to a total of 683 theaters, with an extra four being added later. In its opening weekend, the film grossed over $31.1 million. With its opening week sales, the film set multiple records. It became the highest box office total for a Super Bowl weekend, the highest-grossing opening for a three-dimensional film, and highest per-screen average ever – $42,000 per screen. It went on to gross over $42.8 million in its entire opening week, becoming the highest-grossing film of that week and the film with the fewest theaters to debut at number one. Following its commercial success, the film's run was extended; it eventually closed on May 15, 2008, playing in theaters for 15 weeks. With a total gross of $70.6 million worldwide, Hannah Montana & Miley Cyrus: Best of Both Worlds Concert became the highest-selling concert film of all time, until surpassed by Michael Jackson's This Is It (2009), which sold over $189 million worldwide.

Hannah Montana & Miley Cyrus: Best of Both Worlds Concert received positive to mixed reviews from critics. On Metacritic, it generated generally mixed or average reception, earning a collective score of 59 out of 100 based on 13 reviews. On Rotten Tomatoes, the film generated generally fresh reviews, with 73 percent of 42 reviewers giving positive reviews. Michael Hann of The Guardian believed the film was only appealing for young girls. He continued, "There's nothing here to detain you, though equally there's nothing to repel you." Elizabeth Weitzman of the New York Daily News newspaper stated that producers did not use three-dimensional technology to its full potential, but complimented the film as whole, declaring it "as close as you'll come to achieving the best of both worlds". Hannah Montana & Miley Cyrus: Best of Both Worlds Concert was also released to cinema in international markets, including Europe, Latin America, and Oceania, in early 2008. The film was televised on July 20, 2008 on Disney Channel, where it was watched by over 5.9 million viewers. It was released on blu-ray and DVD on August 19, 2008, as an extended edition that features more performances and bonus features.

A live album, titled Best of Both Worlds Concert, was taken from same concerts as the film and released on March 11, 2008. It consisted of an audio CD and a DVD with two concerts performances and behind-the-scenes footage. The album was first released exclusively to United States' Walmart stores and elsewhere in the United States a month after. Stephen Thomas Erlewine of AllMusic stated, "This is another souvenir for those fans who can't live without the show, and in that regard it's perfectly fine – a nice, polished piece of product that will tide them over until the next new Hannah/Miley album comes along." Best of Both Worlds Concert was commercially successful, peaking at number three on both the US Billboard 200 chart and the Canadian Albums Chart. It also peaked at number sixteen in Australia and was certified gold by the Australian Recording Industry Association for shipments exceeding 35,000 copies.

== Supporting acts ==
- Jonas Brothers (October 18, 2007 – January 9, 2008)
- Aly & AJ (January 11, 2008 – January 24, 2008)
- Everlife (January 25, 2008 – January 31, 2008)

== Set list ==
Act 1 - Hannah Montana

1. "Rock Star"
2. "Life's What You Make It"
3. "Just Like You"
4. "Old Blue Jeans"
5. "Nobody's Perfect"
6. "Pumpin' Up the Party"
7. "I Got Nerve"
8. "We Got the Party" (with Jonas Brothers)

Interlude - Jonas Brothers

9. "When You Look Me in the Eyes"
10. "Year 3000"

Act 2 - Miley Cyrus

11. "Start All Over"
12. "Good and Broken"
13. "See You Again"
14. "Let's Dance"
15. "Right Here"
16. "East Northumberland High"
17. "G.N.O. (Girl's Night Out)"
18. "The Best of Both Worlds"

Encore

19. "I Miss You"

=== Notes ===
- Cyrus performed "I Miss You" and "Ready, Set, Don't Go" with Billy Ray Cyrus as the encore for some concerts.
- Starting with the show in Detroit, Cyrus performed "Rock and Roll All Nite" with Aly & AJ in place of "We Got the Party" due to the absence of the Jonas Brothers
- "Clear" was performed as encore during the Miami show.
- During the Miami show, Cyrus performed "The Best of Both Worlds" with her Hannah Montana co-star Mitchel Musso.

== Tour dates ==
List of concerts with date, city, country and venue
Date	City	Country	Venue	Attendance	Revenue
October 18, 2007	St. Louis	United States	Scottrade Center	15,199 / 15,199	$866,507
October 20, 2007	Moline	United States	iWireless Center	10,798 / 10,798	$614,620
October 21, 2007	Minneapolis	United States	Target Center	15,111 / 15,111	$874,860
October 23, 2007	Omaha	United States	Qwest Center Omaha	15,169 / 15,169	$774,941
October 25, 2007	Denver	United States	Pepsi Center	13,559 / 13,559	$684,681
October 26, 2007	Salt Lake City	United States	EnergySolutions Arena	27,420 / 27,420	$1,347,979
October 27, 2007	Salt Lake City	United States	EnergySolutions Arena	27,420 / 27,420	$1,347,979
October 29, 2007	Seattle	United States	KeyArena	12,714 / 12,714	$754,661
October 30, 2007	Portland	United States	Rose Garden Arena	14,876 / 14,876	$742,654
November 1, 2007	Oakland	United States	Oracle Arena	—	—
November 3, 2007	Anaheim	United States	Honda Center	13,177 / 13,177	$779,330
November 4, 2007	San Jose	United States	HP Pavilion	13,494 / 13,494	$803,515
November 5, 2007	Fresno	United States	Save Mart Center	12,307 / 12,307	$676,089
November 7, 2007	Los Angeles	United States	Staples Center	13,788 / 13,788	$1,000,245
November 8, 2007	San Diego	United States	San Diego Sports Arena	11,637 / 11,637	$698,481
November 9, 2007	Glendale	United States	Jobing.com Arena	13,955 / 13,955	$830,748
November 11, 2007	Houston	United States	Toyota Center	13,471 / 13,471	$769,809
November 12, 2007	San Antonio	United States	AT&T Center	15,214 /15,214	$758,182
November 14, 2007	Fort Worth	United States	Fort Worth Convention Arena	12,704 / 12,704	$709,282
November 15, 2007	Bossier City	United States	CenturyTel Center	13,020 / 13,020	$646,288
November 19, 2007	Tampa	United States	St. Pete Times Forum	15,396 / 15,396	$854,692
November 20, 2007	Sunrise	United States	BankAtlantic Center	15,194 / 15,194	$846,022
November 23, 2007	Nashville	United States	Sommet Center	15,370 / 15,370	$937,763
November 24, 2007	Knoxville	United States	Thompson–Boling Arena	16,348 / 16,348	$794,582
November 25, 2007	Greensboro	United States	Greensboro Coliseum	16,918 / 16,918	$830,151
November 27, 2007	Charlotte	United States	Charlotte Bobcats Arena	15,841 / 15,841	$887,924
November 28, 2007	Duluth	United States	Arena at Gwinnett Center	11,082 / 11,082	$634,422
November 29, 2007	Memphis	United States	FedExForum	14,201 / 14,201	$773,149
December 1, 2007	North Little Rock	United States	Alltel Arena	15,635 / 15,635	$794,603
December 2, 2007	Oklahoma City	United States	Ford Center	15,455 / 15,455	$815,824
December 3, 2007	Kansas City	United States	Sprint Center	13,896 / 13,896	$897,351
December 5, 2007	Auburn Hills	United States	The Palace of Auburn Hills	16,451 / 16,451	$940,456
December 6, 2007	Grand Rapids	United States	Van Andel Arena	12,437 / 12,437	$652,470
December 8, 2007	Rosemont	United States	Allstate Arena	14,329 / 14,329	$832,819
December 9, 2007	Indianapolis	United States	Conseco Fieldhouse	15,180 / 15,180	$781,205
December 11, 2007	Columbus	United States	Nationwide Arena	15,297 / 15,297	$762,877
December 12, 2007	Lexington	United States	Rupp Arena	14,280 / 14,280	$1,425,847
December 13, 2007	Cincinnati	United States	U.S. Bank Arena	12,692 / 12,692	$665,415
December 15, 2007	Toronto	Canada	Air Canada Centre	14,666 / 14,666	$956,224
December 16, 2007	Rochester	United States	Blue Cross Arena	10,811 / 10,811	$559,366
December 17, 2007	Philadelphia	United States	Wachovia Center	15,330 / 16,439	$1,099,276
December 19, 2007	Hartford	United States	Hartford Civic Center	13,204 / 13,204	$752,434
December 20, 2007	Providence	United States	Dunkin' Donuts Center	10,660 / 10,660	$645,528
December 21, 2007	Worcester	United States	DCU Center	23,308 / 23,308	$1,358,873
December 22, 2007	Worcester	United States	DCU Center	23,308 / 23,308	$1,358,873
December 27, 2007	Uniondale	United States	Nassau Veterans Memorial Coliseum	28,572 / 28,572	$1,636,052
December 28, 2007	Uniondale	United States	Nassau Veterans Memorial Coliseum	28,572 / 28,572	$1,636,052
December 29, 2007	Newark	United States	Prudential Center	29,210 / 29,210	$1,716,788
December 30, 2007	Newark	United States	Prudential Center	29,210 / 29,210	$1,716,788
January 3, 2008	Cleveland	United States	Quicken Loans Arena	16,562 / 16,562	$829,825
January 4, 2008	Pittsburgh	United States	Mellon Arena	13,651 / 13,651	$713,546
January 5, 2008	Atlantic City	United States	Boardwalk Hall	13,673 / 13,673	$787,563
January 7, 2008	Washington, D.C.	United States	Verizon Center	16,103 / 16,103	$909,981
January 8, 2008	Baltimore	United States	1st Mariner Arena	13,231 / 13,231	$757,634
January 9, 2008	Albany	United States	Times Union Center	13,141 / 13,141	$705,841
January 11, 2008	Detroit	United States	Joe Louis Arena	16,692 / 16,692	$952,825
January 13, 2008	Milwaukee	United States	Bradley Center	15,723 / 15,723	$900,553
January 14, 2008	Chicago	United States	United Center	15,207 / 15,207	$1,038,753
January 15, 2008	St. Louis	United States	Scottrade Center	15,710 / 15,710	$887,738
January 18, 2008	Las Vegas	United States	MGM Grand Garden Arena	43,817 / 43,817	$2,552,940
January 19, 2008	Las Vegas	United States	MGM Grand Garden Arena	43,817 / 43,817	$2,552,940
January 20, 2008	Las Vegas	United States	MGM Grand Garden Arena	43,817 / 43,817	$2,552,940
January 22, 2008	Glendale	United States	Jobing.com Arena	14,102 / 14,102	$824,410
January 24, 2008	Austin	United States	Frank Erwin Center	13,422 / 13,422	$987,467
January 25, 2008	Lafayette	United States	Cajundome	10,753 / 10,753	$627,416
January 26, 2008	New Orleans	United States	New Orleans Arena	12,962 / 13,064	$887,421
January 28, 2008	Orlando	United States	Amway Arena	21,363 / 23,872	$1,742,498
January 29, 2008	Orlando	United States	Amway Arena	21,363 / 23,872	$1,742,498
January 30, 2008	Jacksonville	United States	Jacksonville Veterans Memorial Arena	10,753 / 10,753	$754,628
January 31, 2008	Miami	United States	American Airlines Arena	13,976 / 13,976	$899,443
March 9, 2008 (Note: This concert was part of the Houston Livestock Show and Rodeo.)	Houston	United States	Reliant Stadium	—	—
Total				960,207 / 963,937 (99.6%)	$55,945,469

== Personnel ==
Creative Team

- Director – Kenny Ortega
- Choreographer – Kenny Ortega, Teresa Espinosa
- Design – Kelly McFadden
- Lighting and Video Designer – Abigail Rosen Holmes
- Management – Jason Morey, Jim Morey
- Photography – Brian Love, Kevin Mazuer, Michael T. Williams
- Production Design – Michael Cotten
- Screens Content Director – Steve Gerdes
- Staff & Crew Production Coordinator – Omar Abderrahman
- Video Techs – Eric Geiger, Steve "Bone" Gray, Evan Huff, Justin McLean, Dane Mustola, Mark Woody
- Wardrobe Designer – Dahlia Foroutan

Band

- Music Direction – Stacy Jones, John Taylor
- Guitar – Jamie Arentzen, John Taylor
- Keyboards – Mike Schmid
- Bass – Greg Garbowski, Vashon Johnson
- Drummers – Stacy Jones, Jack Lawless
- Background vocals – Candice Accola, Kay Hanley

Dancers

- Myke Dizon
- Teresa Espinosa
- Mandy Jiroux
- Marshall Lake
- Ashlee Nino
- Ryan Novak
- Jason Pettigrew
- Jennifer Talarico
