= The Best of Both Worlds (song) =

Single by Hannah Montana

from the album Hannah Montana
- B-side: "If We Were a Movie"
- Released: March 28, 2006
- Genre: Pop rock; teen pop
- Length: 2:54
- Label: Walt Disney Records
- Songwriters: Matthew Gerrard; Robbie Nevil
- Producer: Matthew Gerrard

Miley Cyrus singles chronology
"The Best of Both Worlds" (2006)	"Who Said" (2006)

"The Best of Both Worlds" is a song by fictional character Hannah Montana, recorded by American singer and actress Miley Cyrus for the soundtrack of the Disney Channel series Hannah Montana and used as its theme song. It was released by Walt Disney Records on March 28, 2006 as the lead single from the soundtrack album. A live version is available on Hannah Montana & Miley Cyrus: Best of Both Worlds Concert (2008), a karaoke version is included in the soundtrack's karaoke series (2008), and the 2009 Movie Mix is featured on Hannah Montana: The Movie soundtrack (2009). The song has elements of bubblegum pop and pop rock. Lyrically, it is a showcase of the double life lived by Miley Stewart.

"The Best of Both Worlds" is considered to be one of Cyrus' signature songs, introducing her to the music industry. The song received generally positive reviews; critics noted that the song was written well despite its "weird" concept. "The Best of Both Worlds" reached number 92 on the Billboard Hot 100, making the song only one of two television themes of the decade (the other being "Leave It All to Me" by Miranda Cosgrove) to chart on the Hot 100, and achieved some commercial success internationally. The song reached its highest international chart peak position on the Irish Singles Chart, at number seventeen. A promotional music video for the song was taken from a recording of a concert performance. Cyrus promoted the song by performing it at several venues, including her performances as the opening act for The Cheetah Girls' 2006 The Party's Just Begun Tour and as the closing number on her own 2007 Best of Both Worlds Tour. Cyrus' performances of the song on tour were as herself, but when she performed the song on television, it was in character as Hannah Montana.

== Background ==
"The Best of Both Worlds" (2006)
A 29-second sample of Hannah Montana's "The Best of Both Worlds." The song was written by Disney writers for the television series as an explicit showcase of "leading a double life."

"The Best of Both Worlds" is a song with influences from dance, rock and country music, and its instrumentation features offbeat electric guitars, upbeat synths and backing vocals. It is set in common time with a tempo of 124 beats per minute. The song is in the key of D-flat major.

The song was written by Matthew Gerrard and Robbie Nevil. The duo wrote three other songs on the Hannah Montana soundtrack and continue writing songs for the franchise, including "Nobody's Perfect" and "Ice Cream Freeze (Let's Chill)." Lyrically, the song is one of several songs ("Just Like You", "The Other Side of Me", "Old Blue Jeans", "Ordinary Girl" and "Rock Star") that explicitly allude to Stewart's double life as Montana: regular adolescent that moved from Nashville, Tennessee to Malibu, California by day and pop star by night. In the song, Cyrus sings about the privileges and advantages that are faced in leading in two lives, with references to Orlando Bloom, concerts, friendship and film premieres.

== Critical reception ==
The song received generally positive reviews from critics. Heather Phares of AllMusic described the song as having "sharper-than-average songwriting" and one of the best tracks from the Hannah Montana soundtrack. Chris Willman of Entertainment Weekly compared the song to the musical styles of Avril Lavigne, Ashlee Simpson and Britney Spears. However, Willman stated that the concept of "The Best of Both Worlds" was "a nice fantasy for Brangelina, but a weird one to push on little girls".

== Chart performance ==
The song received low airplay due to it being released to Radio Disney, but not to other mainstream radio stations. The song debuted at number 64 on Billboard's Hot Digital Songs Chart which led to an appearance on the Billboard Hot 100 for the week ending August 12, 2006. It debuted and peaked at number 92 on the Hot 100, and stayed on the chart for two weeks. In the same week of its entry on the Hot 100, the song charted at number seventy-one on the Pop 100 and dropped from the chart the following week.

"The Best of Both Worlds" reached higher peak chart positions in Europe. For the week ending February 22, 2007, the song debuted and peaked at number seventeen in the Irish Singles Chart, and dropped out of the chart the following week. The song debuted and peaked at number 43 on the UK Singles Chart dated Feb. 24, 2007, and spent one week on the chart. It became Cyrus's highest-peaking single in the United Kingdom, when credited as Hannah Montana. In 2008 it charted in the German Singles Chart, debuting at number 71 and eventually peaking at number 66. It spent a total of seven weeks on the chart.

== Live performances ==
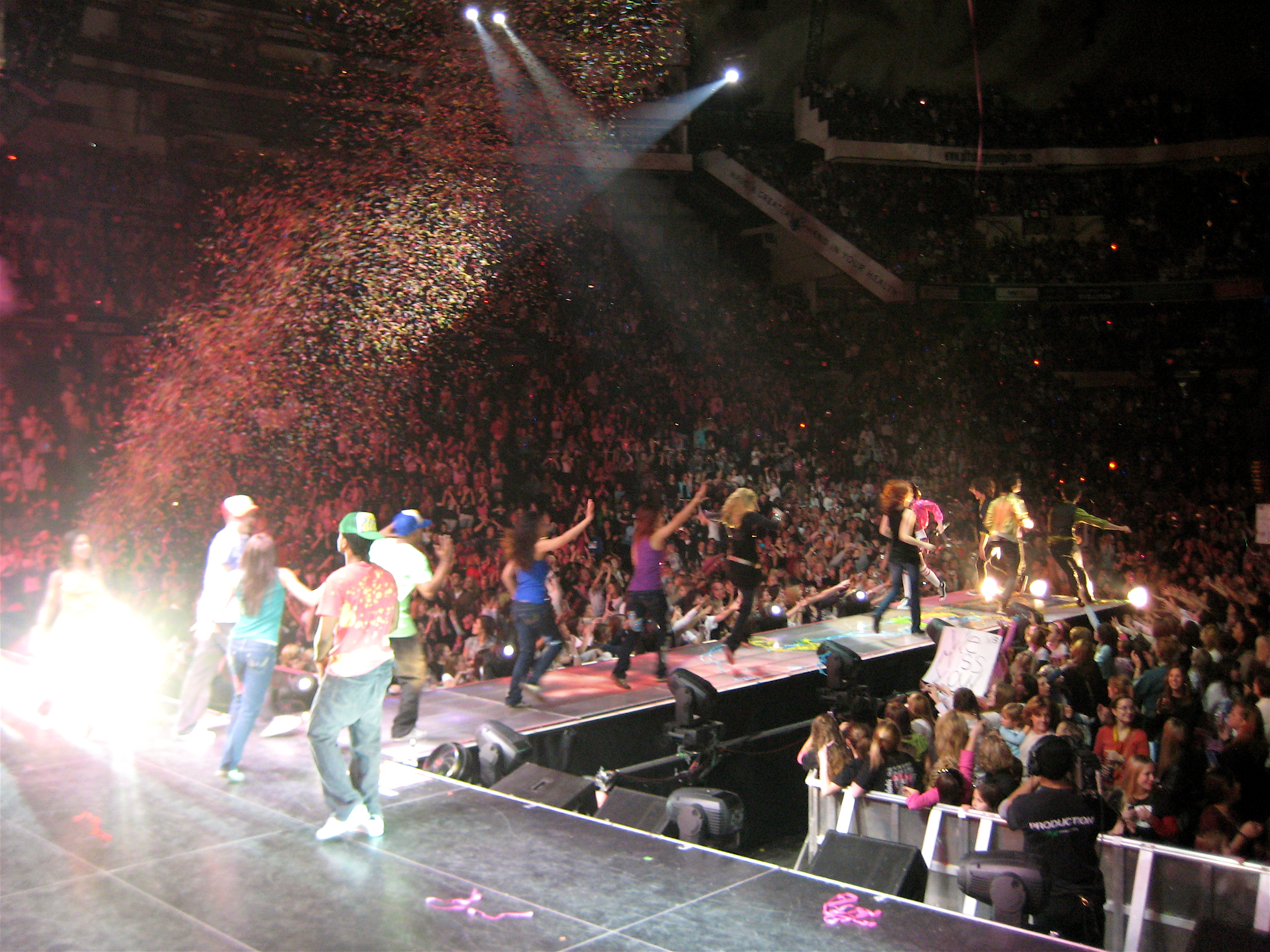
Cyrus performing "The Best of Both Worlds" during the tour of the same name.

Cyrus often dressed as the Hannah Montana character when she performed "The Best of Both Worlds" at concerts and promotional television appearances. At the concert taping to promote the first season of Hannah Montana, Cyrus dressed in boots, jeans, a pink-sequinned blouse, khaki jacket, and blonde wig, to perform "The Best of Both Worlds" and five other songs. She also performed complex choreography and acted out several of the song's lyrics with the background dancers. This performance premiered on Disney Channel as the promotional video for the song and the television series on March 3, 2006. On June 23, 2006, Cyrus performed the song at Disney's Typhoon Lagoon. Cyrus performed the song on twenty dates when she opened for The Cheetah Girls' 2006 concert tour The Party's Just Begun Tour. On October 23, 2006, she performed it on Good Morning America, and she performed it again the following day on Live with Regis and Kelly. The following month she performed it at the 2006 Macy's Thanksgiving Day Parade.

On March 28, 2007, Cyrus appeared as Hannah Montana and performed the song for Hannah Montana: Live in London at Koko. The event was televised on several international Disney Channels. On December 20, 2007, Cyrus performed the song as herself on The Oprah Winfrey Show. "The Best of Both Worlds" was later performed as the closing number on Cyrus' first headlining Best of Both Worlds Tour. She performed the song as herself, wearing an all-pink outfit composed of a tank top, plaid mini-skirt, sneakers, and a jacket. She most recently performed "The Best of Both Worlds: The 2009 Movie Mix", from the Hannah Montana: The Movie soundtrack, with eight other songs, at the concert taping for the third season of Hannah Montana; the concert was held on October 10 in Irvine, California at the Verizon Wireless Amphitheatre. In 2024, at the D23 Expo for the Disney Legends, country singer Lainey Wilson sang this song.

== Track listings ==
- US/EU Digital Single
1. "The Best of Both Worlds" - 2:54
- US/EU CD Single
1. "The Best of Both Worlds" - 2:54
2. "If We Were a Movie" - 3:03
- FR CD Single
1. "Le Meilleur des Deux" (French Version by Sarah) - 2:54
2. "The Best of Both Worlds" (Instrumental) - 2:54
3. "The Best of Both Worlds" (Original Version) - 2:54
- UK EP Digital Download
1. "The Best of Both Worlds" - 2:54
2. "If We Were a Movie" - 3:03
3. "The Best of Both Worlds" (Daniel Canary Remix) - 2:36

== Charts ==
Chart (2006–2008)	Peak position
Germany (Official German Charts)	66
Ireland (IRMA)	17
UK Singles (OCC)	43
US Billboard Hot 100	92
US Billboard Pop 100	71

== Certification ==
Region	Certification	Certified units/sales
New Zealand (RMNZ)	Gold	15,000^{‡}
United Kingdom (BPI)	Silver	200,000^{‡}
United States (RIAA)	Platinum	1,000,000^{‡}
^{‡} Sales+streaming figures based on certification alone.
