= Hannah Montana (soundtrack) =

2006 soundtrack album by Hannah Montana

Soundtrack album by Hannah Montana
- Released: October 24, 2006
- Genres: Pop rock; teen pop; country pop
- Length: 42:26
- Label: Walt Disney
- Producers: Antonina Armato; Mike Deneen; Andy Dodd; Eddie Galan; Matthew Gerrard; Jamie Houston; Tim James; Jay Landers; Andrew Lane; Marco Marinangeli; Adam Watts

Miley Cyrus chronology
Hannah Montana (2006)	Hannah Montana 2: Meet Miley Cyrus (2007)

Singles from Hannah Montana
- 1. "The Best of Both Worlds" Released: March 28, 2006; 2. "Who Said" Released: July 11, 2006

Hannah Montana is the soundtrack album for the first season of the television series of the same name, released on October 24, 2006 by Walt Disney Records. The program itself premiered through the Disney Channel on March 24, 2006; after becoming an immediate commercial success, production on its soundtrack began the following month. Eight of its thirteen tracks are performed by the series' lead actress Miley Cyrus, and are credited to her character Hannah Montana. The groups The Click Five, Everlife, B5, and recording artist Jesse McCartney each contribute one recording, while a duet between Cyrus and her father Billy Ray Cyrus is included as the final track. Hannah Montana was reissued as a two-disc special edition on March 20, 2007. The soundtrack was further promoted during the Cheetah Girls' Party's Just Begun Tour, for which Cyrus served as an opening act, and her own Best of Both Worlds Tour. The soundtrack is primarily a pop rock record, which sees additional influences from teen pop, pop-punk, and country pop musical styles. The lyrical themes revolve largely around "girl power", teen romance, and the double life that Cyrus' character lives on the program.

Hannah Montana received generally favorable reviews from music critics, who appreciated its overall production. It debuted at number one on the US Billboard 200 with first-week sales of 281,000 copies. In doing so, it became Cyrus' first number-one album, the first television soundtrack to reach the top position on the chart, and the fourth soundtrack from The Walt Disney Company to debut in the top-ten of the chart. The record has since been certified triple-platinum by the Recording Industry Association of America (RIAA), having exceeded shipments of three million copies in the United States. The soundtrack charted moderately on international record charts, having reached the top-twenty in countries including Austria, Canada, Norway, and Spain.

The series theme song "The Best of Both Worlds" was released as the lead single from Hannah Montana on March 28, 2006 on digital markets and later as a CD single. It reached number 92 on the US Billboard Hot 100. "Who Said" was released as the second single on digital platforms from the album peaking at 83 in the US.

== Background and composition ==
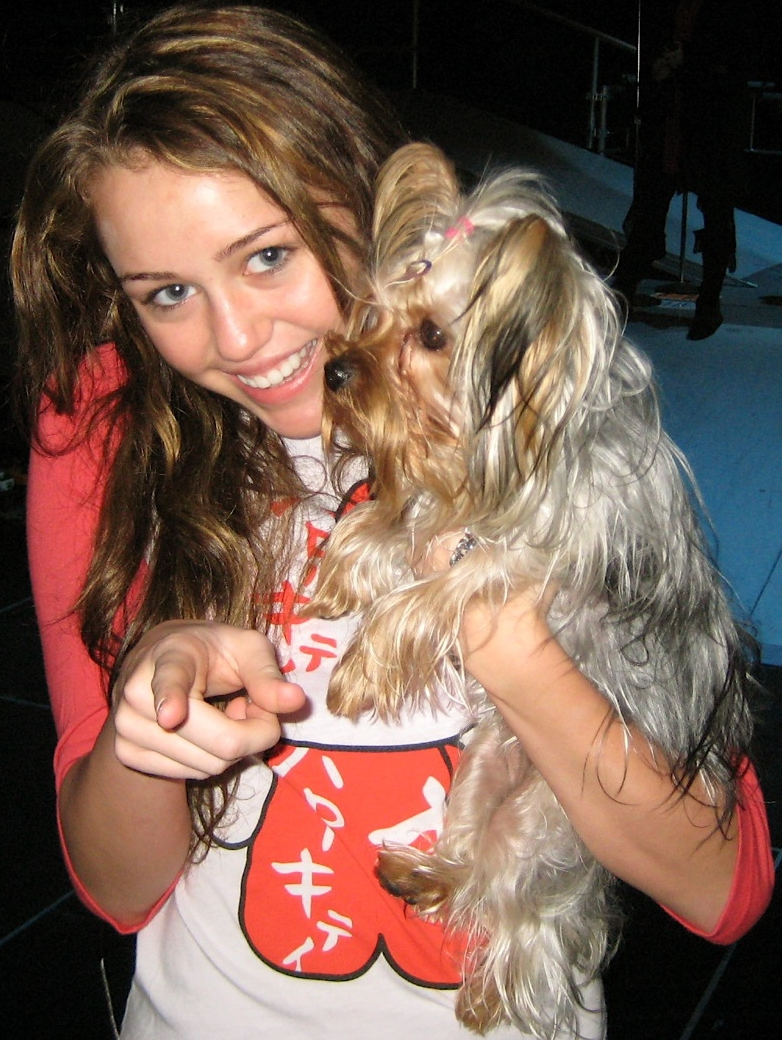
Miley Cyrus portrayed the title character on the television series Hannah Montana.

During production of the first season of Hannah Montana, Cyrus commented that at the moment, they were focused on improving the series as much as possible, however recording a soundtrack for it was a plausible plan for the future. The series itself premiered through the Disney Channel on March 24, 2006, and became an immediate commercial success; with 5.4 million viewers, the pilot episode earned the channel the highest ratings in its history at the time. The following month, it was reported that an accompanying soundtrack and Cyrus' debut studio album had both begun production, the first of which was scheduled to be released during fall 2006. These plans were expected to capitalize on promotional efforts previously used for Hilary Duff, who had successfully transitioned from the title character of the television series Lizzie McGuire into a career in the music industry in the early 2000s.

In the series, Cyrus portrays the character Miley Stewart, a teenager who lives the secret double life as the pop star Hannah Montana. She stated that "most songs for the first season reflect the show, with Miley or Hannah making sure the other doesn't get caught or whatever," opining that the tracks provided series producers with the opportunity to "make sure that everyone understood the characters". By comparison, Cyrus described later material used by the series as "more speaking out to the fans." The record incorporates elements of teen pop, pop rock, and country pop musical styles. Cyrus performs eight of its thirteen tracks, which are credited to Hannah Montana. Her songs "The Best of Both Worlds" and "This Is the Life" describe the double life that Cyrus' character maintains, while "If We Were a Movie" and "I Got Nerve" respectively address a romantic desire and "girl power".

"Pop Princess" by The Click Five was described by Heather Phares from AllMusic as "sparkly power pop"; she also characterized "Find Yourself in You" by Everlife as "the template for Hannah's rock-edged pop". The soundtrack closes with the country pop duet "I Learned From You" between Cyrus and her father Billy Ray Cyrus, which Phares felt drew influences from recording artist Vanessa Carlton. The soundtrack was later reissued as a two-disc special edition, which saw the inclusion of the track "Nobody's Perfect", which was later featured on the following soundtrack Hannah Montana 2: Meet Miley Cyrus (2007).

== Singles ==
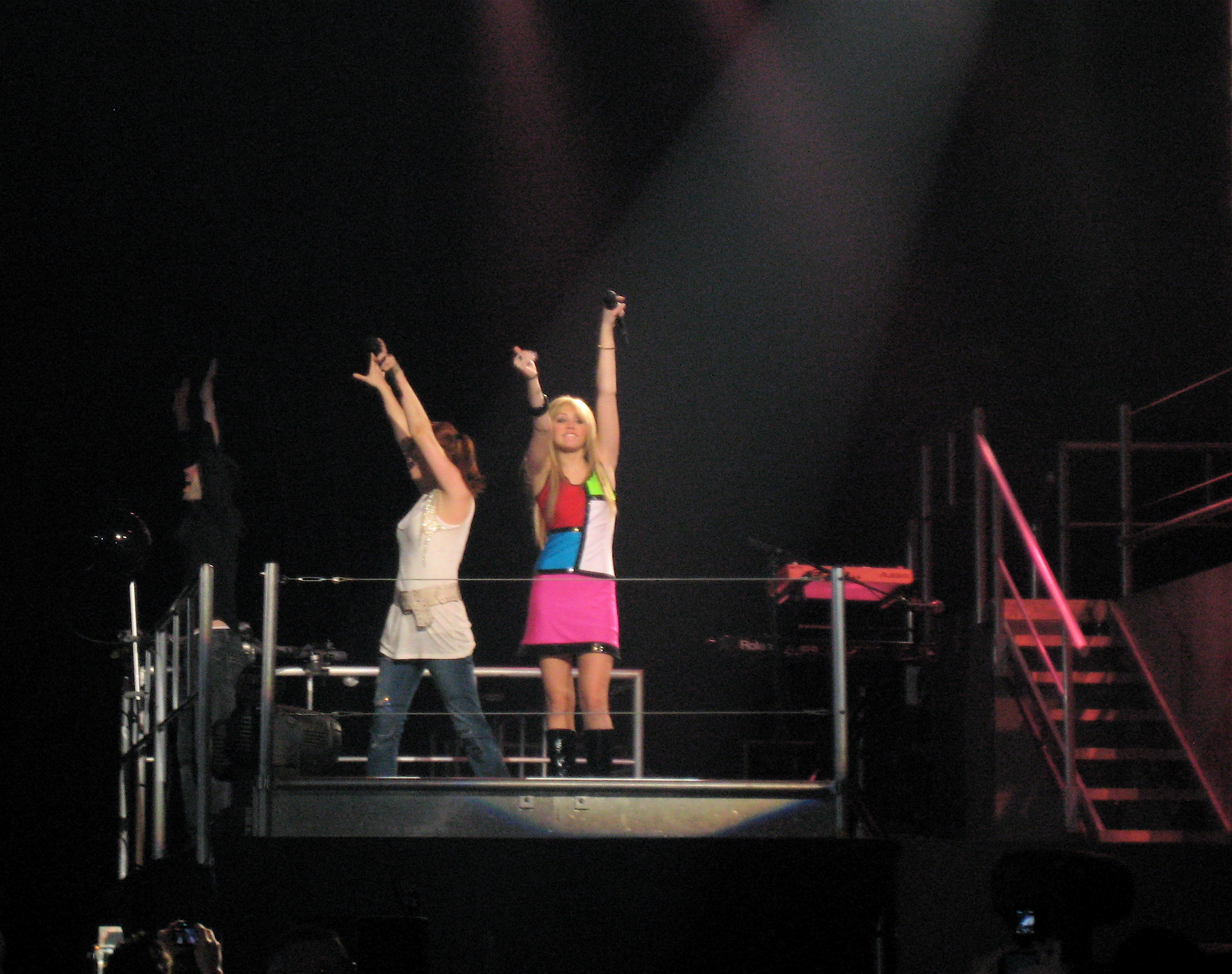
Cyrus performing "Pumpin' Up the Party" on the Best of Both Worlds Tour.

The series' theme song "The Best of Both Worlds" was released as the lead single from Hannah Montana on March 28, 2006; it reached number 92 on the US Billboard Hot 100. Several tracks from the soundtrack charted in the United States.

"Who Said" was released as the second single on July 11, 2006.

== Promotion ==
Cyrus' first live performances were during The Cheetah Girls' Party's Just Begun Tour in 2006 and 2007. She performed as Hannah Montana, and served as a "rotating" opening act in place of recording artists Vanessa Hudgens, Jordan Pruitt and groups Everlife and T-Squad. Cyrus later embarked on the nationwide Best of Both Worlds Tour in 2007 and 2008. It primarily served as a promotional tool for the recently released record Hannah Montana 2: Meet Miley Cyrus (2007); however, "Just Like You", "Pumpin' Up the Party", "I Got Nerve", and "The Best of Both Worlds" from the original soundtrack were included in its set list. The tour proved commercially successful, having grossed $54 million by its conclusion, while its 2008 film adaption Hannah Montana & Miley Cyrus: Best of Both Worlds Concert earned $63 million. The latter was released as a Walmart-exclusive CD/DVD set, titled Best of Both Worlds Concert, in March 2008.

== Critical reception ==
Professional ratings
Aggregate scores
Source	Rating
Metacritic	66/100
Review scores
Source	Rating
AllMusic	4/5 stars
Common Sense Media	4/5 stars
Entertainment Weekly	C−
MSN Music	3.5/5 stars
Knight Ridder	3/4 stars

Hannah Montana received generally favorable reviews from music critics, who appreciated its overall production. Writing for AllMusic, Heather Phares enjoyed Cyrus' deliveries of "cute, well-written songs", and added that the overall project was "sweet, starry-eyed, [and] utterly charming". Jennifer Axman from Common Sense Media shared a similar sentiment, appreciating its "upbeat girl-power messages" and distinguishing "I Learned from You" as a stand-out track for its inspirational lyrics ("I learned from you that I do not crumble / I learned from you that strength is something you choose /.../ There is no question that's a lesson I learned from you"). MSN Music gave the record a 3.5 out of 5 stars, and listed it as an "essential album". However, Chris Willman provided a more mixed review, commenting that Cyrus appeared to "mimic Avril, Ashlee, and Britney simultaneously", and felt that the concept of leading a double life was "a nice fantasy for Brangelina, but a weird one to push on little girls." David Hiltbrand was also critical of the record, stating that its "generic pop" would irritate adult listeners, but acknowledged that it was "slickly executed" for appealing to its younger audience.

== Commercial performance ==
During the week of October 25, initial sales projections recognized Hannah Montana, The Black Parade by My Chemical Romance, and Once Again by John Legend as the most-likely records that would reach number one on the US Billboard 200. On November 1, Hannah Montana officially debuted at number one with first-week sales of 281,000 copies, making a difference of 41,000 units more than The Black Parade, which charted at number two. In doing so, the record became the first television soundtrack to debut in the peak position and fourth soundtrack from The Walt Disney Company to debut in the top-ten of the chart. It remained at number one the following week with sales of 203,000 copies. Furthermore, the soundtrack became Cyrus' first of six number-one albums in the United States to date, having been followed by Hannah Montana 2: Meet Miley Cyrus (2007), Breakout (2008), Hannah Montana: The Movie (soundtrack) (2009), Bangerz (2013), and Bass Persuades (2026). It was eventually certified triple-platinum by the Recording Industry Association of America (RIAA) for exceeding shipments of three million units. As of January 2014, Hannah Montana has sold 3,736,000 copies in the United States, becoming the second best-selling television soundtrack behind High School Musical with 4,878,000 copies. Internationally, Hannah Montana charted moderately on national record charts. It peaked at number 10 on the Canadian Albums Chart, and was certified gold by Music Canada. The record charted at number 23 on the Top 100 Mexico chart, where it was later recognized with gold certification. In Europe, the soundtrack reached number 14 on the Spanish PROMUSICAE. It additionally earned a gold certification in the United Kingdom. As of 2014, the soundtrack has sold 3.74 million million copies in the United States.

== Track listing ==
Hannah Montana track listing^{[a]}
No.	Title	Writer(s)	Producer(s)	Length
1.	"The Best of Both Worlds"	Matthew Gerrard; Robbie Nevil	Gerrard	2:54
2.	"Who Said"	Gerrard; Nevil; Jay Landers	Gerrard	3:14
3.	"Just like You"	Adam Watts; Andy Dodd	Watts; Dodd	3:14
4.	"Pumpin' Up the Party"	Jamie Houston	Houston	3:09
5.	"If We Were a Movie"	Jeannie Lurie; Holly Mathis	Antonina Armato; Tim James	3:03
6.	"I Got Nerve"	Lurie; Ken Hauptman; Aruna Abrams	Armato; James	3:06
7.	"The Other Side of Me"	Gerrard; Nevil	Gerrard	3:07
8.	"This Is the Life"	Lurie; Shari Short	Marco Marinangeli	2:58
9.	"Pop Princess" (performed by The Click Five)	Ben Romans	Mike Denneen	4:24
10.	"She's No You" (performed by Jesse McCartney)	Gerrard; Jesse McCartney; Nevil	Gerrard; Ginger McCartney; Jay Landers; Sherry Kondor	3:33
11.	"Find Yourself in You" (performed by Everlife)	Gerrard; Amber Ross; Julia Ross; Sarah Ross	Gerrard	3:35
12.	"Shining Star" (performed by B5)	Maurice White; Larry Dunn; Philip Bailey	White; Dunn; Bailey	2:44
13.	"I Learned from You" (performed by Miley Cyrus and Billy Ray Cyrus)	Gerrard; Steve Diamond	Gerrard	3:25
Total length:				42:26

Special edition bonus track^{[b]}^{[c]}
No.	Title	Writer(s)	Producer(s)	Length
14.	"Nobody's Perfect"	Gerrard; Nevil	Gerrard	3:20
Total length:				46:06

Notes

- ^{^a}All songs performed by Hannah Montana, unless otherwise noted.
- ^{^b}The special edition includes the bonus DVD which features backstage secrets and the music video of "Nobody's Perfect".
- ^{^c}The limited edition includes a bonus DVD which features five music videos.

== Charts ==
=== Weekly charts ===
Chart (2006–09)	Peak position
Australian Albums (ARIA)	35
Austrian Albums (Ö3 Austria)	14
Canadian Albums (Billboard)	10
Danish Albums (Hitlisten)	23
Dutch Albums (Album Top 100)	67
French Albums (SNEP)	122
Hungarian Albums (MAHASZ)	9
Mexican Albums (Top 100 Mexico)	23
New Zealand Albums (RMNZ)	22
Norwegian Albums (VG-lista)	11
Spanish Albums (Promusicae)	14
UK Compilation Albums (Official Charts)	7
UK Soundtrack Albums (Official Charts)	1
US Billboard 200	1
US Kid Albums (Billboard)	1
US Soundtrack Albums (Billboard)	1

Chart (2026)	Peak position
Irish Compilation Albums (IRMA)	19
Portuguese Albums (AFP)	170

=== Year-end charts ===
Chart (2006)	Position
US Billboard 200	91
US Soundtrack Albums (Billboard)	6

Chart (2007)	Position
Mexican Albums (Top 100 Mexico)	37
US Billboard 200	4
US Soundtrack Albums (Billboard)	1

Chart (2008)	Position
Austrian Albums (Ö3 Austria)	70
US Billboard 200	71
US Soundtrack Albums (Billboard)	8

=== Decade-end charts ===
Chart (2000–09)	Position
US Billboard 200	84

== Sales and certifications ==
Region	Certification	Certified units/sales
Argentina (CAPIF)	Platinum	40,000^{^}
Brazil (Pro-Música Brasil)	Gold	30,000^{*}
Canada (Music Canada)	Gold	50,000^{^}
Germany (BVMI)	Gold	100,000^{^}
Mexico (AMPROFON)	Gold	50,000^{^}
New Zealand (RMNZ)	Gold	7,500^{^}
United Kingdom (BPI)	Gold	100,000^{^}
United States (RIAA)	3× Platinum	3,700,000
^{*} Sales figures based on certification alone.^{^} Shipments figures based on certification alone.

== Release history ==
Country	Date	Version	Format	Label	Ref.
United States	October 24, 2006	Standard	CD; digital download	Walt Disney	
United Kingdom	November 20, 2006	Standard	CD; digital download	Walt Disney	
United States	March 20, 2007	Special edition	CD	Walt Disney	
United States	March 04, 2026	Standard	Vinyl	Walt Disney	
