= Nobody's Perfect (Hannah Montana song) =

Single by Hannah Montana

from the album Hannah Montana 2
- Released: May 15, 2007
- Genre: Dance-rock
- Length: 3:20
- Label: Walt Disney
- Songwriters: Matthew Gerrard; Robbie Nevil
- Producer: Matthew Gerrard

Miley Cyrus singles chronology
"Who Said" (2006)	"Nobody's Perfect" (2007)	"Make Some Noise" (2007)

Music video
- "Nobody's Perfect" on YouTube

"Nobody's Perfect" is a song by fictional character Hannah Montana, recorded by American singer and actress Miley Cyrus for the soundtrack album Hannah Montana 2 (2007), which accompanied the second season of the Disney Channel series Hannah Montana. It was released on May 15, 2007 by Walt Disney Records as the lead single from the soundtrack album. Written by Matthew Gerrard and Robbie Nevil and produced by Gerrard, "Nobody's Perfect" discusses the importance of overcoming mistakes; it is heavily based on synthpop musical styles.

Contemporary music critics spoke favorably of "Nobody's Perfect" in their reviews, and were appreciative of its overall production. The track peaked at number 27 on the U.S. Billboard Hot 100; by exceeding sales of 906,000 copies as of October 2010, it has additionally become the most successful track from the Hannah Montana franchise. A live performance of Cyrus performing the track as Montana serves as the accompanying music video for the track; it was broadcast first on Disney Channel, although it was later included in the Vevo catalog. The song was also performed during Cyrus' headlining Best of Both Worlds Tour (2007–08).

== Background and composition ==
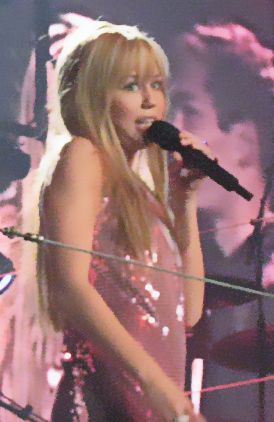
Miley Cyrus portrayed Hannah Montana (pictured) on the television series.

In Hannah Montana, Miley Cyrus portrays the character Miley Stewart, a teenager who lives the secret double life as the pop star Hannah Montana. She stated that "most songs for the first season reflect the show, with Miley or Hannah making sure the other doesn't get caught or whatever," opining that the tracks provided series producers with the opportunity to "make sure that everyone understood the characters". By comparison, Cyrus described material used during the second season as "more speaking out to the fans."

"Nobody's Perfect" was written and produced by Matthew Gerrard; he additionally oversaw its mixing and programming, and performed the guitar, bass, and keyboards. Greg Critchley plated the drums, while Marco Luciana was responsible for the keyboards and Ashley Sauning contributed the background vocals. "Nobody's Perfect" appears as the second track on Hannah Montana 2 with a duration of three minutes and twenty seconds. It is written in the key of C-minor with Cyrus' vocals spanning two octaves from C_{4} to D_{5}. The song was described by Allmusic as "synth-driven pop", and discusses the importance of overcoming mistakes.

== Release ==
Before being released as the lead single from Hannah Montana 2 on May 15, 2007, "Nobody's Perfect" was included on the reissued two-disc special edition of the original soundtrack Hannah Montana (2006) on March 20, 2007. Within the Hannah Montana storyline, "Nobody's Perfect" was written by Miley's father Robby Stewart; it is first heard in the episode "Get Down, Study-udy-udy" during the second season, where Miley reworks the song into the "Bone Dance" as a way of helping her study for a biology mid-term exam. A live performance of Cyrus performing the track as Montana acts as an accompanying music video for the track; it was initially released on July 3, 2007, although it was reissued through Vevo on December 10, 2010. It was also performed during Cyrus' headlining Best of Both Worlds Tour (2007–08).

== Reception ==
"Nobody's Perfect" received generally favorable reviews from contemporary music critics. Writing for AllMusic, Heather Phares appreciated the incorporation of "shiny, synth-driven pop", which she credited with "[making] the first soundtrack a hit." Shirley Halperin from Entertainment Weekly shared a similar sentiment, describing it as "pure pop candy". Bob Waliszewski and Bob Smithouser from Plugged In classified "Nobody's Perfect" as "pro-social content", where "rather than [beating] herself up over mistakes, the singer acknowledges that 'Nobody's Perfect'" through the lyrics "Everybody has those days" and "You live and you learn it". "Nobody's Perfect" charted at number 27 on the U.S. Billboard Hot 100, and reached numbers 14 and 25 on the Billboard Digital Songs and Pop 100 charts, respectively. As of October 2010, the track has sold 906,000 copies in the United States, becoming the most successful song from the Hannah Montana franchise. "Nobody's Perfect" also charted at numbers 73 and 87 on the Hot Canadian Digital Singles and Australian ARIA Charts, respectively.

== Credits and personnel ==
Credits adapted from the liner notes of Hannah Montana 2.

Recording

- Mastered at Capitol Mastering (Hollywood, California)

Personnel

- Greg Critchley – drums
- Matthew Gerrard – songwriter, producer, mixing, guitar, bass, keyboards, programming
- Marco Luciana – keyboards
- Hannah Montana – lead vocals
- Robbie Nevil – songwriter
- Ashley Sauning – background vocals

== Charts ==
Chart performance for "Nobody's Perfect"
Chart (2007)	Peak position
Australia (ARIA)	87
Canada (Canadian Digital Songs) (Billboard)	73
US Billboard Hot 100	27
US Pop 100 (Billboard)	25

== Certification ==
Region	Certification	Certified units/sales
United States (RIAA)	Platinum	1,000,000^{‡}
^{‡} Sales+streaming figures based on certification alone.

== Release history ==
Country	Date	Format	Label	Ref.
United States	May 15, 2007	Digital download	Walt Disney	
