= List of Kickin' It episodes =

Kickin' It is an American comedy television series created by Jim O'Doherty that aired on Disney XD from June 13, 2011, to March 25, 2015. The series stars Leo Howard, Dylan Riley Snyder, Mateo Arias, Olivia Holt, Alex Christian Jones, and Jason Earles.

== Series overview ==
Season	Episodes	Originally released	
Season	Episodes	First released	Last released
1	21	June 13, 2011	March 26, 2012
2	23	April 2, 2012	December 3, 2012
3	22	April 1, 2013	January 27, 2014
4	18	February 17, 2014	March 25, 2015

== Episodes ==
=== Season 1 (2011–2012) ===
No. overall	No. in season	Title	Directed by	Written by	Original release date	Prod. code	U.S. viewers (millions)
1	1	"Wasabi Warriors"	Eric Dean Seaton	Jim O'Doherty	June 13, 2011	101	0.87
New student Jack meets Milton, Jerry, Kim, and Eddie at the Seaford High cafeteria, where Frank and his friends from the Black Dragons try to cause trouble. However, Milton, Jerry, Kim, and Eddie are impressed when Jack uses karate to defeat Frank and his friends. Later, Rudy learns that if he does not earn two belts at the next karate tournament, the Bobby Wasabi Martial Arts Academy will be shut down. Milton, Jerry, and Eddie tell Rudy about Jack, who crashes into the dojo while running away from mall security. Later, Rudy tells Jack that if he joins the dojo and helps with winning the tournament, he will stay out of trouble. Jack tells Rudy that he is a skater, but does reveal that his grandfather was a karate sensei, who trained Bobby Wasabi. Rudy is impressed and explains that the dojo was built on the principles of the Wasabi Code, and Jack agrees to help win the tournament. Later, Jack visits the Black Dragon Dojo, where he discovers that Kim is also a Black Dragon. Kim asks Jack to join the Black Dragons, but he declines because of his deal. When Jack returns to the dojo, he discovers that Rudy broke the Wasabi Code by lying about how much trouble he was in and leaves. Jack later returns to help win the tournament when he realizes he himself broke the Wasabi Code by leaving. Later, Frank's sensei Ty has him try to get rid of the competition during the tournament by cheating and kicking the back of Jack's leg. Kim sees this and decides to quit the Black Dragons. Jack manages to work through the pain and win the Wasabi Warriors' second belt. Guest stars: Loni Love as Marge, Wayne Dalglish as Frank, Ian Reed Kesler as Sensei Ty, Chris Coppola as Officer Bloat, Byrne Offutt as Milton's Dad
2	2	"Fat Chance"	Eric Dean Seaton	Dan O'Keefe	June 14, 2011	105	0.75
While trying to put his spelling bee trophy next to Jack's gymnastics trophy in the school hallway, Milton falls off the ladder, but is caught by a custodian, who is later discovered to be Yoshi Nakamura, a former sumo wrestler. After Milton asks if Nakamura can show him and his friends his celebration stomp move, Principal Burke is upset and fires Nakamura after Milton does a terrible job at defending him. Sad that he was fired, Nakamura hangs out at the dojo, but Jack is insistent on getting Nakamura back in the ring by training him and holding a match at the dojo. Rudy gets Yamazaki to sumo wrestle with Nakamura, but it is discovered that Yamazaki is the sumo wrestler who Nakamura lost to, scaring him and causing him to run into Rudy's office. Upset that it is his fault that Nakamura was fired, Milton attempts to take on Yamazaki himself, which does not go very well. However, this gives Nakamura the strength and confidence to sumo wrestle Yamazaki and he takes over for Milton and ends up winning the match. Guest stars: Peter Oldring as Lonnie, Peter Navy Tuiasosopo as Yoshi Nakamura
3	3	"Dummy Dancing"	Sean McNamara	Byron Kavanagh	June 15, 2011	107	0.73
A series of mysterious pranks are being pulled on the Wasabi Warriors. When Milton slides too far on a cafeteria tray in the school hallway and crashes, it is discovered that grease had been put on it; when Jerry is taking a shower at the dojo, he uses a shampoo bottle that is actually pink hair dye and freaks out. Later, while Kim and her cheerleaders are getting students pepped up for the basketball team, Kim gets stuck on the basketball banner when she tries to run and break through it. Finally, when Jack notices that Heather, a girl that he likes, is reading the note that he left at her locker and is starting to walk over toward him, he has Milton and Jerry spruce him up by spraying deodorant on his armpits and delinting him. He then finishes it off by applying a splash of cologne; however, he discovers that someone has put blue cheese in it, a smell that he cannot stand which causes him to vomit on Heather's shoes. Everyone who has been pranked suspects Truman, an obnoxious student whose father controls the mall's security cameras, to be behind the pranks; however, they discover that Eddie has been pulling the pranks. They also discover that Truman has been blackmailing Eddie to pull these pranks after the mall cameras captured Eddie practicing for the school dance. In order to help him, Jack, Milton, Jerry, and Kim sneak into Truman's father's office to retrieve the flash drive the video file is on, which they successfully do. The next morning, when Truman shows up at the dojo and confronts the Wasabi Warriors about the stolen flash drive, they show Truman an embarrassing video of himself freaking out, but state they will not post it because they are not like him. Jack then tells Truman that both videos should be deleted and he should stop messing with them, to which he agrees. Guest stars: Peter Oldring as Lonnie, Brooke Dillman as Joan, Reed Alexander as Truman
4	4	"Dojo Day Afternoon"	Eric Dean Seaton	Jim O'Doherty	June 16, 2011	103	0.68
Mr. Turner, the new owner of the mall, wants to replace the dojo with a parking lot, which upsets the Wasabi Warriors. In order to improve their chances at keeping the dojo, Rudy wants his students to befriend Mr. Turner's son Arthur; however, it turns out that Arthur is a rude and spoiled child. After Arthur tries to attack Jack and Jack throws him at a wall, Mr. Turner is upset after Rudy promised that the dojo is a safe environment for Arthur to make friends and wants Jack to be kicked out of the dojo. Rudy refuses to kick Jack out and Mr. Turner tells him that he and the others have two hours to get out of the building; however, the Wasabi Warriors will not go down without a fight and Rudy has the others chain him up to a post in the dojo to protest. Later, Mr. Turner brings in a wrecking ball to scare the Wasabi Warriors into leaving, but it gets out of hand when Arthur actually tries to destroy the dojo. Jack takes it on himself to save the dojo and climbs onto the crane to stop the wrecking ball; however, he must first defeat Arthur, which he successfully does. After seeing what his son has done and what the dojo is about, Mr. Turner decides to let the dojo stay. Guest stars: Sterling Beaumon as Arthur, Noelani Bailey as Margaret, Jerry Kernion as Mr. Turner
5	5	"Swords and Magic"	Eric Dean Seaton	Eric Goldberg & Pete Tibbals	June 20, 2011	102	1.22
Milton invites his friends to participate in Swords and Magic, a LARP battle that takes place once a year, hoping that they will accept in order to support him since it is something he enjoys doing; however, they refuse out of fear that they will be made a laughing stock at the school. After his friends abandon him, Milton talks to Rudy about it, where he learns that Rudy is more than happy to participate in the LARP battle and support him. Later, the Dark Knight King Sidney shows up at the dojo to make fun of Milton and how he will fail. This makes Jack realize that he and the others should participate in order to support Milton; however, the others are still not sure. Jack then states how Milton has always been there for them and makes the others reminiscence about it. On the way to the park, where the battle is taking place, Jack, Jerry, Kim, and Eddie run into different problems after Eddie gets them lost when he takes them through what he believes to be a shortcut. When Jack, Milton, Jerry, and Kim finally arrive at the park, they notice that things are looking bad for Milton. Jack saves Milton just in time, and everyone then helps Milton win the battle. Guest star: Harrison Boxley as Dark Knight King
6	6	"Road to Wasabi"	Sean McNamara	Marc Warren	June 27, 2011	104	0.88
Rudy throws a surprise for himself and everyone has a gift for him, except Jack. After Kim gives Rudy a signed photo of Bobby Wasabi, Jack mentions how he has a better gift; however, Rudy takes that to mean that Jack is bringing the man himself and Jack goes along with it. This inspires Milton, Jerry, and Eddie to come up with a movie on the man himself. Later, when Jack sees how trying to come up with a movie idea is tearing Milton, Jerry, and Eddie apart, he realizes that he must tell them the truth, with a little coercing from Kim, but as he starts to tell them, Bobby Wasabi shows up. When everyone tries to introduce Rudy to Bobby Wasabi, Rudy does not believe it nor does he recognize his hero. This upsets Bobby Wasabi, who comes at Rudy, but Rudy fights back and defeats him; however, when he realizes that it is actually Bobby Wasabi, he tries to apologize for the misunderstanding, but Bobby Wasabi fires him. In an effort to try to get Rudy his job back, everyone breaks into Bobby Wasabi's mansion to talk to him, where they face off against ninjas, splitting Jack and Kim into one group and Milton, Jerry, and Eddie into another group. When Milton, Jerry, and Eddie reach Bobby Wasabi's room, Bobby Wasabi starts to have them taken away, but Milton brings up the movie he, Jerry, and Eddie have been working on, which interests Bobby Wasabi. When Jack and Kim reach Bobby Wasabi's room, they fight with his ninja bodyguards and quickly defeat them. Bobby Wasabi is impressed with a flying dragon kick Jack used against the ninjas, and after consideration, in combination with the movie, he decides to give Rudy his job back at the dojo. Guest stars: Peter Oldring as Lonnie, Joel McCrary as Bobby Wasabi
7	7	"All the Wrong Moves"	Shelley Jensen	Marc Warren	July 11, 2011	110	0.70
Jerry signs himself and the others up for the Battle of the Dance Crews competition, but the others are only skilled in karate and are not that great at dancing, so Jerry must train them; however, he gets annoyed when they appear to be showing no signs of improvement. Later, at Falafel Phil's, Jerry and Smooth are talking about the dance competition, and Smooth offers Jerry to be a part of his dance crew, the Step Brotherz, which Jerry accepts. The others come in and are upset to discover that Jerry has bailed on them. Later, while training for the competition, things go awry when Jerry discovers that Smooth was just using him and stole his special dance move. Later, at Falafel Phil's, when the others realize that dancing is Jerry's thing, they agree to rejoin him and take part in the competition. While Jerry's friends may not be great at dancing, they are great at karate and use that in their performance at the competition, and Jerry finishes off the performance with a new special move he worked on. While the Step Brotherz end up winning the trophy and $1,000 prize, Jerry also ends up winning a trophy for best individual dancer, which upsets Smooth, who tries to one-up him, but ends up slipping and falling off the stage. Guest stars: Loni Love as Marge, Roshon Fegan as Smooth, Brooke Dillman as Joan
8	8	"Ricky Weaver"	Shelley Jensen	Dan O'Keefe	July 18, 2011	108	1.13
Kim falls head over heels for a boy named Ricky Weaver after she wins an essay contest and earns the school a concert from him, which makes Jack jealous. Later, Ricky shows up at the dojo to say hello to Kim before the show and invite her to dance with him during his performance. When Ricky tries to leave the dojo, however, the paparazzi shows up and blocks him from getting to his car. Jack helps him out by taking the paparazzi on and quickly defeating them, which impresses Ricky, who invites Jack on his jet to get cheeseburgers in San Francisco. Later, when the stage is being set up at the school for Ricky's performance, Jack learns from Ricky that his record company makes him do these school concerts and that the winners are just cute girls he chooses while going through pictures of the contestants. Additionally, Ricky plans on taking Kim backstage after the concert, making a move on her, and then dumping her. Later, Jack tries to warn Kim about Ricky, but she does not believe him and thinks he is just making up lies because he does not like him. Jack tries to find Kim after the concert, only to see that she has sent Ricky flying out of the backstage room and into a table in the school hallway after realizing that Jack was telling the truth. Guest star: Austin North as Ricky Weaver
9	9	"Wax On, Wax Off"	Neal Israel	Danny Warren	July 25, 2011	112	1.07
After the Wasabi Warriors win a tournament at the dojo, Bobby Wasabi sends them a life-sized wax statue of himself as a prize; however, things go awry when Jack and Jerry find a fancy neon sign and plug it in, only for it to blow out the power in the whole mall courtyard during a heat wave. With no air conditioning, Jack and Jerry must find a cold area to keep the wax statue until power is restored; however, it does not go so well for Jerry, who gets into trouble along the way. Later, Rudy manages to restore the power on the roof of the dojo, but gets blown off the roof once the compressors kicks in and releases a giant blast of air. Later, Jack and Jerry return to the dojo, hoping everything is resolved, but things go wrong again when Jerry returns from a flea bath Rudy gave him a coupon for and sees that the wax statue has melted. To make matters worse, Bobby Wasabi shows up for a photo shoot and becomes upset at Rudy when he sees the melted wax statue. Everyone starts taking responsibility for the wax statue which falls in line with the Wasabi Code and impresses Bobby Wasabi, who forgives Rudy. Guest stars: Joel McCrary as Bobby Wasabi, Dan Ahdoot as Falafel Phil, Brooke Dillman as Joan, Ron Fassler as Dale Davis Absent: Alex Christian Jones as Eddie
10	10	"The Commercial"	Neal Israel	Danny Warren	August 15, 2011	106	0.82
Realizing he can act, Rudy hires Jerry as his manager and schedules an audition at the dojo. During the audition, Jack is working on a new bo staff routine, but the bo staff slips out of his hands and breaks the camera that is filming Rudy. Jerry walks in and tells Rudy that he got him an audition for the part of Pomegranate Man to promote a new drink called Pomegranate Pow from director Terrence. Later, during the Pomegranate Pow audition, Rudy is nervous and struggles with his lines; when Jack tells him that he should perform the new karate move that he invented, Rudy agrees, but forgets how to do the move. When Jack steps in to help Rudy, he ends up getting the part, which upsets Rudy, who thinks that Jack sabotaged him and stole his part in the commercial and later thinks that Jack is stealing his career when Jerry becomes Jack's manager instead. Later, at the commercial filming location, Jack and Jerry discover that Pomegranate Man's enemy, the drowsies, is being played by Rudy. During filming of the commercial, Rudy strays from the script and gets into a fight with Jack, but during the struggle, Rudy's cable snaps on one side. As the other side of Rudy's cable snaps, Jack saves him. Afterward, Rudy apologizes to Jack for being a jerk, and the two make up. Meanwhile, Milton stresses out after failing his cake test and getting his first non-A grade in Mr. Pedesta's class. Kim manages to talk Mr. Pedesta into giving Milton a second chance; however, things go wrong after Milton stays up all night watching an angry English chef show on The Food Channel and starts barking orders at Kim and Eddie and later fires Eddie. Later, after realizing he has been a jerk, Milton takes the cake baking from a different approach and uses chemistry to bake a cake; however, things do not go exactly as planned when Mr. Pedesta takes out a golden metal fork to try a piece of the cake and the chemicals in the cake react to the metal. Guest star: Jonathan Kite as Terrence
11	11	"Kung Fu Cop"	Shelley Jensen	Edward C. Evans	October 17, 2011	111	0.68
After Jack stays up for two consecutive nights playing Kung Fu Cop '77 and loses to Milton during sparring, Rudy insists that he take a nap in his office as he will not have him sparring in his condition. This upsets Jack, who reluctantly agrees. In Rudy's office, Jack finds Kung Fu Cop '77, a Bobby Wasabi movie that the video game is based on, and starts watching it, but falls asleep. Jack has a dream that he and the others are in a '70s-themed disco movie as alternate personas of themselves. Chief Eddie wakes Jack up so that he can meet his number-one kung fu cop known as Bobby Wasabi. Initially, Jack and Bobby Wasabi do not hit it off well, but when Snowflake Jones comes in stating that her dragon's eye necklace was stolen from her, they agree to work together and take the case. However, Chief Eddie forbids them from taking the case, but they ignore his orders and take it on, anyway, In order to find out what happened to the necklace, Jack, Snowflake Jones, and Bobby Wasabi find and interrogate knowledgeable people who can find out where the necklace has been. At Falafel Phil's, they meet La Boca, who tells them that someone has been flashing the necklace around at a new club called The School. At the school, Jack, Snowflake Jones, and Bobby Wasabi confront Milty Moondust, a musician who is performing there, who tells them that a man who has the necklace is located at a lava lamp factory. Milty takes the group to the factory, where they discover that Chief Eddie is the evil mastermind behind the necklace's theft. Eddie sends out ninjas to take care of the group, but they quickly take them down. Eddie tries to get away, but Jack catches up with him. Eddie then throws the necklace down at a vat of lava since he cannot have it, but it gets caught on a pipe. Jack manages to get it and throw it back to Snowflake Jones, but the pipe breaks from his weight and he starts falling toward the vat of lava. At that point, Rudy wakes Jack up from his dream, who is now feeling better from getting some much needed sleep. Jack apologizes to Rudy as he did not mean to be disrespectful earlier, but Rudy tells him not to worry about it and forgives him.
12	12	"Boo Gi Nights"	Eric Dean Seaton	Eric Goldberg & Pete Tibbals	October 24, 2011	109	0.58
Frank threatens to crash the mall's annual Halloween Boo-Stravaganza and Jack tells him that he better not try anything, because when he does, it usually does not go well. Later, when a clown shows up in the mall courtyard and offers Jack a coupon for Circus Burger, Jack freaks out and goes running into the dojo. Unfortunately, not only do Milton and Kim see this freakout, but so does Frank, who starts scheming to scare Jack. Milton and Kim then discover Jack's fear of clowns and learn that the fear stems from his fifth birthday party not going exactly as planned. Later, the Black Dragons show up and crash the Halloween party dressed up as clowns, which scares Jack, who runs and hides in the dojo; however, after a pep talk from Milton, Jack gets the idea to blindfold himself and use his other senses to fight the Black Dragons. Everything goes well until Frank unmasks Jack, but when Jack sees that Milton is in trouble, Jack gathers his courage and defeats Frank, causing the rest of the Black Dragons to retreat. Guest stars: Loni Love as Marge, Wayne Dalglish as Frank, Dan Ahdoot as Falafel Phil, Stephanie Arellano as Catwoman
13	13	"Clash of the Titans"	Shelley Jensen	Frank O. Wolff	November 14, 2011	115	0.47
Milton likes a girl named Julie and talks to Kim at Falafel Phil's about how the first time he saw her in chemistry class, his heart stopped, but he is terrified about asking her out in fear of being rejected. Later, Julie runs into Jack in the school hallway and asks if Milton likes her and then proceeds to tell him how the first time she saw Milton in chemistry class, it was like she was watching a movie and Milton was the star. However, she is terrified about asking Milton out, also in fear of being rejected. Later, Jack and Kim are talking at the dojo about it and agree to help Milton and Julie by setting them up on a date at Falafel Phil's. Everything goes well and the two start dating; however, things go wrong when Milton and the other Wasabi Warriors discover that Julie's uncle is Ty. Both Rudy and Ty do not approve of the two dating and forbid them from seeing each other again; however, not giving up, Jack and Kim continue to help Milton and Julie by sneaking them around while they date and acting as their lookouts. Rudy discovers that Jack and Kim have been sneaking Milton and Julie around and is upset. Jack then asks Rudy why he and Ty have been feuding for 15 years. Rudy explains that they were both studying with the grandmaster, but only one of them would be deemed worthy of being his apprentice. On top of a mountain for their final competition, they battled for hours trying to knock each other off their stumps, but when Ty became distracted, it gave Rudy an opening to defeat him. This upset Ty as he thought it was Rudy who distracted him and accused him of cheating; since then, the two have been feuding. Jack tells Rudy that it is time for the feud to end and wants to arrange a sitdown so that he and Ty can talk things out, to which he agrees after Kim tells him to do it for Milton and Julie. Later, Jack, Milton, Kim, Rudy, Ty, Frank, and Julie are all together at the table, but things with Rudy and Ty are off to an awkward start. Rudy and Ty eventually hesitantly agree to make up, but things go wrong when they start fighting over the last falafel ball. Later, Julie states that she and Milton have talked and agreed to not see each other anymore. Rudy and Ty begin to realize that they have let their problems become everyone else's problems and allow Milton and Julie to see each other. Guest stars: Ian Reed Kesler as Sensei Ty, Brooke Dillman as Joan, Wayne Dalglish as Frank, Hannah Leigh as Julie
14	14	"Badge of Honor"	Michael Kelly	Jim O'Doherty	November 21, 2011	113	0.61
When Milton drops his lemonade on the ground, he accidentally stops a robber from escaping; however, before he has a chance to explain that it was an accident, Joan makes him a security guard, believing he intentionally stopped the robber. After feeling disrespected by his friends, he ends up going along with it; however things go wrong when he lets the power go to his head and dresses up like a security guard. Later, when Milton is too soft and fails to give Jack a citation for skateboarding in the courtyard, he starts getting out of control and calls the health inspector, who shuts down the dojo for mold that has been growing on the mats which Rudy has failed to take care of. This upsets his friends, who start to feel like Milton is acting like a jerk. Rudy then tells Jack and Kim that two men he met in the parking lot will be coming by with steam cleaners to clean the mats, hoping that the dojo will be able to reopen by the next day. Later, Jerry and Eddie are upset when they discover that Milton had their bikes impounded for being chained to the Captain Corndog statue. Jerry and Eddie then walk into the dojo, wanting to see the place being steam cleaned by the men Rudy hired, but quickly discover that they are robbers, who end up tying them up. Then Milton walks in to the robbery in progress and tries to stop the robbers, but ends up getting tied up as well. However, after admitting that the first robber he stopped simply slipped on his lemonade and receiving a pep talk from Jerry and Eddie, Milton gathers his courage, breaks free, and defeats the robbers. Guest stars: Dan Ahdoot as Falafel Phil, Brooke Dillman as Joan
15	15	"The Great Escape"	Eric Dean Seaton	Andrew Lee	November 28, 2011	117	0.54
Jerry takes the blame for a prank Milton pulls in the cafeteria and gets detention; unfortunately, detention happens to be on Saturday, the same day as the tournament at the dojo that Jerry's family will be attending. This detention is also a maximum security lockdown detention rather than a normal detention and is run by Mr. Coburn; however, since Mr. Coburn has never seen Jerry before, Jack comes up with a plan to pretend to be Jerry and have detention in his place so Jerry can go to the tournament. However, the plan goes wrong when Jerry's ego gets the best of him and he subconsciously admits he is the real Jerry and is put into detention. Later, Jack, Milton, and Kim come up with a plan to dress Milton up like Jerry and switch him with Jerry. At the school, Kim distracts Mr. Coburn by pretending to be a student who got sent to detention, while Jack and Eddie lower Milton down into the room via the ventilation system in the ceiling and switch him with Jerry. The rest of the students in detention later realize that the Jerry in there is actually Milton, who they think is a nerd, and start getting ready to hit him. but Milton tells them that he can also get out. Milton later reveals himself to Mr. Coburn, which upsets him because nobody has ever outsmarted him and escaped; however, Milton offers a deal to him that he will keep quiet and not ruin his perfect record if a few changes are made to detention, to which Mr. Coburn agrees. Later, it is time for Jerry's match in the tournament, but his friends do not know where he is. Rudy then finds him outside and learns that he is nervous about how his family will feel if he loses; however, Rudy reassures him that his family loves him no matter what. Jerry then takes on his opponent, but quickly loses; however, he is surprised to see that his family is still cheering for him. Guest stars: Dan Ahdoot as Falafel Phil, Richard Riehle as Mr. Coburn
16	16	"Dude, Where's My Sword?"	Shelley Jensen	Marc Warren	February 6, 2012	120	0.60
While Rudy, Bobby Wasabi, and Phil are away on a road trip, Rudy leaves the others in charge of the dojo, who use the opportunity to throw a party; however, it goes wrong when Kevin and his friends crash the party. Jack talks to Kevin to try to get him and his friends to leave, but he just shoves Jack out of the way. Not having it, Jack uses karate on Kevin and his friends, quickly subduing them and ending the party, but also leaving the dojo in a mess. To make matters worse, the Wasabi Warriors discover that Rudy's special katana has gone missing. Milton is able to find that a pawnshop called the Bronze Nugget Pawnshop has a katana just like Rudy's. Jack, Milton, and Kim go to the pawnshop, while Jerry and Eddie stay behind to clean up. When Jack, Milton, and Kim get to the pawnshop, they discover that the katana will cost them $500, so they try to sell a lot of their junk, only to discover that they would only get $97 for it. When Milton asks the pawnshop owner Lou to see an old French horn, he discovers something special about it and asks if Lou would give them the French horn for all of their junk, to which he agrees. Milton later reveals that the French horn belonged to Lorenzo Sanzoni, the greatest French horn maker and composer. When Lou asks Milton how much the French horn is worth, Milton tells him that they just bought his pawnshop and demands that Lou give them the sword. Later, back at the dojo, Jack, Milton, and Kim notice how clean the place is, though Jerry got stuck in a wall in the process; when everyone hears Rudy pulling up, Jack quickly puts the katana where it belongs. Unfortunately for Jack, Milton, Kim, and Eddie, Jerry later blabs to Rudy about everything while still stuck in the wall. Guest stars: Joel McCrary as Bobby Wasabi, Dan Ahdoot as Falafel Phil, Eddie Pepitone as Lou
17	17	"Breaking Board"	Shelley Jensen	Edward C. Evans	February 13, 2012	116	0.73
Jack and Jerry are practicing for a speed board competition, but it goes wrong when Jack accidentally kicks Jerry in the stomach. Jack, Milton, and Eddie take Jerry to the hospital, where he ends up getting too comfortable. When the doctor comes in and tells him that he can go home, Jerry fakes severe pain in order to stay. Kim, who is volunteering at the hospital, takes care of Jerry. Milton and Eddie get into trouble when they find a babies room and accidentally get the babies mixed up, but later discover that they have ankle bracelets for this very reason. Jack decides not to participate in the competition as he is really worried about Jerry. Jerry, on the other hand, is using his fake injury to his advantage and keeps having Kim get him pudding; however, when she returns from one of her pudding trips and sees Jerry dancing to a song, she becomes upset, and Milton and Eddie later also learn that he has been faking. Later, to get back at Jerry, Kim tells him that the test results came back as not good and that he needs immediate surgery; to keep him from escaping, Kim had Jerry strapped down to his bed. As Milton and Eddie, dressed up as doctors, attempt to start his surgery, Jerry freaks out and admits the truth just as Jack comes in. Jack becomes upset with Jerry because he was worried sick about him; in order to make things right, Jerry holds Jack's boards during the competition, which Jack ends up winning. Guest stars: Dan Ahdoot as Falafel Phil, Dan Ahdoot as Phyllis, Marc Evan Jackson as Doctor Rose, Travis Johns as Duke Evans
18	18	"Reality Fights"	Sean Lambert	Jim O'Doherty	February 27, 2012	118	0.90
Bobby Wasabi signs a deal to produce a brand new martial arts reality show called Wasabi Warrior in Rudy's dojo, which the Wasabi Warriors will be participating in to win a water rider. However, Eddie warns the rest of the team of the dangers of a reality show and how it can bring out the worst in people since they will be playing against each other; however, his warning inadvertently goes ignored when Bobby Wasabi tells Rudy that he can host the competition. The Wasabi Warriors must partake in several mental and physical challenges. Milton, Kim, and Eddie take on the first challenge at the Dragon's Playground, which Milton ends up winning, but he must make a tough choice afterward. Jack and Jerry take on the second challenge at the Emperor's Bridge, which Jack manages to win after some clever thinking, but he must also make a tough choice. After the second challenge, the participants can decide to vote one competitor out of the competition, and Jack is shocked when the others vote him out since he is the biggest threat. However, Jack has a chance to get back into the competition during the third challenge, which is The Banzai Brunch. The food is prepared by Jack himself, who has made really gross dishes. If at least one of the others is able to eat their dish, Jack stays out; however, nobody is able to eat their dishes, putting Jack back in the competition. The final challenge is The Hang Tough Wall, where the participants must hang from pegs sticking out of the wall for as long as possible while dealing with various objects being thrown at them, with the last remaining participant being the winner. With tensions already high, everyone starts arguing, but Eddie, who had warned them earlier about this, yells at them to stop it. The others realize how they have been acting and all agree to drop at the same time, but when they do, they see that Eddie has double-crossed them and is still hanging. Eddie wins the competition and receives the title of Wasabi Warrior. Guest star: Joel McCrary as Bobby Wasabi
19	19	"Kickin' It in China"	Eric Dean Seaton	Edward C. Evans & Byron Kavanagh	March 5, 2012	119	0.88
Jack is invited to go to the Junior World Martial Arts Championships taking place on the Great Wall of China in China, something Jack has been dreaming of ever since he got into martial arts. Jack wonders how he got invited and Rudy reveals that he wrote a letter about him and sent it to China. When Rudy talks about how amazing Jack is because he is undefeated and has never lost a match in his life, Jack asks if they can talk outside, where he reveals that he is not undefeated and that a boy named Kai beat him up so badly that he gave up karate until coming to the dojo. Rudy reassures Jack that he deserves this and reveals that he was sent two first-class tickets to China; however, Jack trades them in for cheaper tickets so that everyone can go. Later, after they arrive in China, Jack manages to win the semi-finals, but discovers that Kai is there, who he will be facing in the finals. Jack loses his confidence and reveals to Kim and Rudy that Kai is his cousin and explains that both he and Kai studied with their grandfather, but to Kai, karate was not about honor and discipline, it was about intimidation and hurting people. Kim and Rudy give Jack a pep talk and encourage him not to give up, and he agrees as he remembers the Wasabi Code. Later, Jack is ambushed by martial arts fighters in the hallway of the building the championships are taking place at; he has the upperhand at first, but is later smacked in the hand by a sneak attack, falling down in pain. Kai surprisingly shows up and rescues him. A doctor later examines Jack's hand and reveals that it is broken and Jack cannot compete in the finals. Later, Kai is given a trophy for winning the finals and Jack wants to be a good sport and congratulate him, but when he notices that the tattoo on his friend's arm is the same tattoo he saw on the arm of one of the people who ambushed him, Jack realizes that Kai set the whole thing up and had his friends ambush and attack him. After Jack tells Kai that he is afraid to fight him, Kai becomes enraged and attacks him. Kim and Rudy keep Kai's friends from interfering while Jack fights with Kai. When Jack accidentally tosses Kai over the Great Wall of China, he quickly grabs him and pulls him up; however, after Kai is back on safe ground, instead of being thankful, he resumes the fight and takes a cheap shot at Jack's hand. Despite his broken hand, which has been further injured from Kai's cheap shot, Jack manages to defeat Kai. Guest stars: Troy Romzek as Kai, Karen Maruyama as Pei Pei, Matthew Moy as Shen
20	20	"The Wrath of Swan"	Neal Israel	Byron Kavanagh	March 12, 2012	114	0.71
Kim asks Jack if he will go with her to the Swan's Court Cotillion, but he does not want to go and tells her he will not go because he hates tuxedos, cannot dance, and is a boy and boys do not do cotillions. Milton and Jerry walk in the dojo and tell Jack and Kim that they got roped into going to the Swan's Court Cotillion. Milton is taking his mother's boss' daughter, while Jerry is taking the daughter's friend, and according to them, both of them are nerds. Later, at the school cafeteria, Frank tells Kim that he is still upset at her for walking out on the Black Dragons and has plans on getting revenge on her. When Jack notices that Kim is in the cafeteria, he goes over to her and gives her the last piece of red velvet cake, aware that she is still upset at him for refusing to go to the cotillion with her. A new student named Brody walks in, who Kim reveals asked her to the cotillion after Jack turned her down. Later, at Falafel Phil's, Brody is talking to Frank about how his initiation to get into the Black Dragons should be over after he has done everything Frank has asked him to do, but Frank tells him it will not be over until after the cotillion. Later, while Milton and Jerry are in the cotillion's bathroom, Frank and his Black Dragons as well as Brody walk in to discuss the plan on getting revenge on Kim. When Frank notices that Milton and Jerry are hiding in a bathroom stall, he has them thrown and locked in the storage closet. Later, at the dojo, Rudy asks Jack who Kim ended up taking to the cotillion, and Jack tells him that it is this new student named Brody Carlson. Rudy tells Jack that Brody is a first-degree black belt, who he tried to recruit, but Brody refused as he was dead set on joining the Black Dragons. Jack then realizes that he was right to be suspicious about Brody and that something was off and says that he needs to get to the cotillion. Later, at the cotillion, Milton and Jerry tell Jack that the Black Dragons are here to get revenge on Kim and that they locked them in the storage closet. Jack already knows that the Black Dragons are going to get revenge and is trying to figure out how. As the swan rolls in to present the crowns for king and queen, which are Kim and Brody, Jack realizes that the swan is how the Black Dragons will get revenge. Frank starts to fire mushroom gravy toward Kim, but Jack jumps in front of her and is hit by most of the gravy. Frank thinks that they have Jack and Kim outnumbered, but Milton and Jerry have their backs and even Brody takes the Wasabi Warriors' side and helps them in fighting the Black Dragons after realizing that the Black Dragons are not what he thought. After defeating the Black Dragons, Brody apologizes to Jack and Kim for being a jerk, and while Jack agrees that he was a jerk, he also tells him that he came through in the end. Jack apologizes to Kim for turning her down and asks if she will dance with him, to which she agrees. Guest stars: Wayne Dalglish as Frank, Billy Unger as Brody, Kaylee Bryant as Carrie, Brooke Laver as Jennie
21	21	"Rowdy Rudy"	Marc Warren	Jim O'Doherty & Dan O'Keefe	March 26, 2012	121	0.78
Rudy is having a bad day, and when a man cuts in front of him at Falafel Phil's, he is not having any of it and uses karate on him. What he does not realize is that the man he attacked is professional wrestler Mondo Mountain. This is captured on video and makes Rudy an Internet sensation. Later, at Falafel Phil's, Jack and the others show up and are amazed with Rudy for being famous. Jack then tells Rudy that he has always taught them not to use martial arts unless absolutely necessary and Rudy tells him that Mondo cut in front of him. Jack takes this to mean that sometimes a person has to take a stand, with which Rudy agrees. Phil tells the group that he called the Wrestle Frenzy people and told them that Rudy wants to get in the ring with Mondo, which shocks Rudy as he is not a professional wrestler. Phil assures Rudy that it is just a show that it is set up so Rudy wins and that Rudy will be paid $5,000. Later, at the dojo, Kim tells Rudy that Jack got detention for getting into a fight with a student at school and flipping them. Rudy talks with Jack about the incident and asks him where he gets the idea that violence is okay, and Jack sarcastically replies that he does not know. Rudy tells Jack about how he is always telling him and the others that it is not okay to fight in school and Jack tells Rudy that he saw someone being picked on and gave the bully a little shove. Jack then explains that he was just taking a stand like Rudy did with Mondo, but Rudy tells him that his situation was completely different. Jack agrees, but tells Rudy that he was protecting someone who really needed help, while Rudy did not like that someone cut in line, and calls him a hypocrite. Later, Rudy texts Jack to come down to the Wrestle Frenzy, where he apologizes to Jack and agrees that he was being a hypocrite and tells him that fighting should always be a last resort. Rudy wants to make things right and tells Mondo that he wants him to win; however, with that change, Mondo secretly has different plans. Later, at the ring, rather than taking it easy, Mondo gives it his all and beats Rudy up. Mondo then has his brother Mongo come into the ring to help land the finishing blow on Rudy, but Jack steps in and helps Rudy out by defeating Mongo, while Rudy defeats Mondo. Meanwhile, Milton is nervous when Julie tells him that it is time to go to the next level; when he talks to Jerry and Eddie about it, Jerry tells him that she is talking about kissing. He is nervous due to a traumatizing experience at a birthday party. Kim tries to help Milton and ends up kissing him out of frustration for being so nervous to make a point; unfortunately, Julie sees this. However, after Kim explains everything to Julie, Julie tells Milton that she was talking about the upper level of the museum. Guest stars: Dan Ahdoot as Falafel Phil, Jason Sehorn as Announcer, Hannah Leigh as Julie, Matthew Willig as Mondo

=== Season 2 (2012) ===
No. overall	No. in season	Title	Directed by	Written by	Original release date	Prod. code	U.S. viewers (millions)
22	1	"Rock 'Em Sock 'Em Rudy"	Rob Schiller	David Bickel	April 2, 2012	203	0.65
Bobby Wasabi introduces his new Wasabitron 3000, a teaching machine so advanced that it will revolutionize karate, which Rudy uses to his advantage and takes the day off, leaving the Wasabitron 3000 in charge of teaching his class. Later, Milton talks to Eddie at Falafel Phil's about how he does not trust the robot and compares it to robot movies, where robots end up going bad and try to take over. Milton gets the idea to download the robot's operating system onto a flash drive to find out what makes it tick and later discovers that the way the system is configured, the robot cannot process erratic computational variances, meaning that when the robot realizes humans are not perfect, its circuitry will not accept it and it will become unpredictable and progressively more violent. Later, when Rudy returns from his day off and sees how much progress Jack, Jerry, and Kim have made without his help, he starts feeling down and talks to Bobby Wasabi in his office, who ends up firing him for being obsolete. Later, Jack, Jerry, and Kim start getting annoyed with the robot when it overworks Jack, tells Kim her breath smells from garlic, and thinks Jerry is a monkey. Jack wants to go and talk to Rudy to have him haul away the piece of junk, with which Jerry and Kim agree, but when they walk into his office, Jack, Jerry, and Kim discover that Bobby Wasabi has fired him. Jack, Jerry, and Kim find Rudy at his home and tell him that, while they are better at karate, they are miserable. Jack tells Rudy that they need and want him back at the dojo and admits that they all got caught up in the excitement of the Wasabitron 3000, but it is not Rudy. When Rudy tells them that the robot is a better teacher and that they do not need him, they assure him that they do need him, telling him that the robot is not their friend, he is. Touched by all the love and support, Rudy decides to fight for his dojo. Later, at the dojo, Bobby Wasabi starts to notice the robot's problems, just as Jack, Jerry, Kim, and Rudy show up and try to come up with a plan. The robot starts going haywire when it realizes that humans will never be perfect, but Milton and Eddie show up and reveal that they have been working on their own robot to take down the Wasabitron 3000; however, the Wasabitron 3000 easily crushes their robot. Everyone takes on the Wasabitron 3000 and tries to defeat it, but it easily overpowers them; however, when it cannot process the fact that the Wasabi Warriors know they cannot win, but will never give up, it short-circuits. Guest star: Joel McCrary as Bobby Wasabi
23	2	"My Left Foot"	Eric Dean Seaton	Glenn Farrington & Geoff Barbanell	April 9, 2012	201	0.54
Milton nominates Jack to be the new Seaford High quarterback, but when he learns that Jack cannot throw a football, he must teach him how to throw. In the process, Milton is made a kicker when the coach sees him kick a 50-yard field goal after Milton is frustrated that Jack is paired with someone other than who he wants him paired with. With Milton a kicker on the football team, he and his friends are able to enjoy all of the advantages that come with it, such as eating actual food in the school cafeteria. Milton begins to realize that being part of the team is not all that it seems to be after he gets too much on his plate that he cannot even show up for karate practice. Before the game, Milton tries to talk to Jack about how he is feeling, but Jack interrupts him and tells him that him being part of the team is the best thing that has ever happened to the Wasabi Warriors. Milton later tells Jack how he is feeling during the game and that he would rather be doing other things, but he does not want to quit the team because he is doing it for Jack and the others. Jack realizes that everyone except Milton is getting something out of Milton being a kicker and tells Milton that everyone wants him to be happy. Milton asks Jack if he and the others would be okay if he walks away, and Jack tells him that it is fine as long as he is happy; before Milton walks away, he finishes and wins the game. Guest star: Dan Ahdoot as Falafel Phil
24	3	"We Are Family"	Rob Schiller	Joel McCrary & Itai Grunfeld	April 16, 2012	204	0.66
The Wasabi Warriors are earning and saving their money to buy a go kart, except Jerry, who is not contributing. Everyone becomes upset with Jerry, but he tells them that he just does not have the talent to make money. Later, Jerry shows up in the go kart that everyone wanted, which shocks and upsets everyone, especially when he reveals that he got a job working for the Meatball King and has decided to go solo. Later, Jack and Kim are at Falafel Phil's, when a man named Dirk shows up and demands that Phil pay his bill. When Phil says he needs more time, Dirk becomes agitated and starts to come at Phil, but Jack blocks his punch and uses karate on him and forces him to retreat. When Jack asks Phil who Dirk is, Phil tells him that Dirk was trying to collect money for meatballs he was forced to buy from the Meatball King, who Kim remembers is Jerry's boss. Later, when Jerry is taking to the Meatball King about Phil, he tells him about Phil's goat Tootsie, not realizing that he is aiding criminals. After Jerry leaves, the Meatball King and Dirk come up with a plan to kidnap Tootsie for ransom. Later, Jack and Kim confront Jerry about the Meatball King being a criminal, but he does not believe them until Phil comes running in and tells everyone that Tootie has been stolen. Without realizing it, Jerry comes up with a plan to strap his cell phone to his chest and meet with the Meatball King to record him confessing to his crimes and turn that recording over to law enforcement. However, everything does not go according to plan when Jerry accidentally stops the phone call with the others, who are back at the dojo recording the call, and when they try to call him back and his phone vibrates, Jerry becomes nervous and ends up jumping out of the window. Later, Jerry reveals the Meatball King is scared of his own boss Schwoz, who even he has never met. Jerry and the others then come up with another plan, which involves Rudy pretending to be Schwoz. Later, the plan works at first and Phil gets Tootsie back, but Tootsie eats Rudy's disguise, revealing the face behind the mask and a fight ensues. The Wasabi Warriors are able to defeat the Meatball King and his goons, and Jerry apologizes for letting the job get to his head and tells everyone that money should never be more important than friendship. Jerry is forgiven and Jack tells him that, in the end, the plan to get Toosie back was his idea and it all worked out. Guest stars: Dan Ahdoot as Falafel Phil, Brooke Dillman as Joan, Joey Coco Diaz as Meatball King, Ethan Wilde as Dirk
25	4	"Eddie Cries Uncle"	Sean McNamara	Jim O'Doherty	April 23, 2012	206	0.66
The school is shutting down the intramural basketball program because the school is out of money, and the Wasabi Warriors must figure out a way to save it. Later, Rudy tells them that if they are upset about the school shutting down the basketball program, then they need to do something about it, such as hold a fundraiser. Rudy offers to make the first donation, but Kim tells him that to save the basketball program, it is going to cost $5,000, which shocks him. Rudy tells the others that they have to come up with a creative way of raising the money. Jerry suggests selling chocolate bars, with which everyone agrees, and Rudy, who says he is a natural salesman, is going to help them. When Rudy scolds them for being on the phone for over two hours and not making a single sale, they quit and must now think of a way to save the basketball program themselves. When Milton sees a poster that says the Harlem Globetrotters are coming to Seaford, Milton suggests that Eddie's uncle can help them out, but Eddie starts acting nervous and tries to find ways to get out of it. Jack insists that Eddie call his uncle Big Easy, but Eddie only pretends to call him after the others go into Falafel Phil's. Eddie walks in and tells them that his uncle must have changed his number and there is nothing that he can do; however, Jack comes up with another way, by having him and the others participate in the Harlem Globetrotters trick shot competition. Later, at the competition, Milton has the first shot, but fails. Then it is Eddie's turn, who tries to sabotage himself, but ends up making the basket and winning the competition. Later, Eddie confides in Jerry that Big Easy is not his uncle and explains that he thought if he told people that he was related to a Globetrotter, it would make him feel special. Jerry understands how Eddie feels and comes up with the plan that Eddie has to convince Big Easy himself that he is his nephew since he has already convinced everyone else. The plan involves dressing Eddie up like Big Easy's aunt Edna and putting him in a wheelchair to tell Big Easy about his nephew, with Jerry dressing up like Aunt Edna's personal caretaker. When they find Big Easy at the restaurant, Eddie does not want to go through with the plan, but Jerry forces him to. Eddie manages to convince Big Easy to participate to save the basketball program; however, when Big Easy goes to hug him, he pops his "balloons", and he and Jerry quickly leave. Later, during the basketball game, the Harlem Globetrotters easily win against the Wasabi Warriors, scoring significantly higher than them; however, the Wasabi Warriors are still happy because they have raised enough money to save the basketball program and managed a score in the double digits. Big Easy later reveals to Eddie that after Eddie's "balloons" popped, he knew what was going on, but still helped him because he figured there was a good reason for it. Special guest stars: Big Easy Lofton as himself, Special K Daley as himself, Dizzy Grant as himself, Flight Time Lang as himself, Wun "The Shot" Versher as himself Guest stars: Loni Love as Marge, Dan Ahdoot as Falafel Phil
26	5	"Skate Rat"	Neal Israel	Geoff Barbanell & Glenn Farrington	April 30, 2012	207	0.60
The rules about no skating in the mall courtyard are cracked down on, and anyone who violates these rules will be banned from the mall, so the Wasabi Warriors must try to think of another place they can skateboard. After Rudy tells them a story about a boy named Luke Sampson who he thought was a loser in school, Rudy learns from Kim that Luke is now a multi-millionaire skateboard mogul. Jack gets the idea to ask Luke for help in building them a skatepark in Seaford as he builds skateparks all over the country, and Kim asks Rudy if he can get them a meeting with him, to which he agrees. Later, at Luke's skating domain LS Industries, Jack asks Luke if he can build them a skatepark in Seaford, but Luke is hesitant as he does not believe there are any real skaters in Seaford. However, after Jack impresses him with his skating skills, Luke shows interest in building their skatepark, and Jack and the others take him to a perfect spot they have found to build it at. After seeing the spot and imagining where everything would go, Luke agrees to build a skatepark in Seaford; however, Milton and Kim discover a rare striped beach vole, a protected species that is living at the building site. They learn that the vole is very territorial and only lives within five miles of its kind, so they change their minds on building the skatepark there. Later, during the opening ceremony of the building site, Kim interrupts the announcement to tell everyone that they cannot build the skatepark there and destroy the vole's home, but everyone does not seem to take it seriously. Jack later talks to Luke about it and Luke tells him that he has a way to make both things work. Later, Jack tells Kim about how he spoke to Luke, who had the great idea of paying to have the vole relocated to a preserve in Oregon, where the species is protected. Kim is not sure as the building site is the vole's home, but Jack assures Kim that it will have a better home in Oregon. Later, Rudy, who had fallen asleep at LS Industries, overhears Luke talking to his friend about how he made up a story about a preserve in Oregon, and that when Jack and the others arrive to give them the vole, he plans on killing it later. Jack and the others arrive, and Rudy jumps out of the foam pit and warns them about Luke's plan. A fight ensures between the Wasabi Warriors and Luke and his friends, but the Wasabi Warriors manage to defeat them. Later, the wildlife inspector declares the land there a protected animal sanctuary, giving the vole a safe place to live. Guest stars: Brooke Dillman as Joan, Evan Hofer as Randy, Daniel Booko as Luke
27	6	"Capture the Flag"	Rob Schiller	Itai Grunfeld & Joel McCrary	May 7, 2012	208	0.74
It is time for Seaford on Parade, but Rudy hates this time of the year since Seaford will be reminded of the horrible thing he let happen. Rudy reveals to the others that when he was in high school, a boy named Teddy Kavanagh and his friends from Swathmore Academy attacked him while he was working on his lentil-themed float. He fought back, but when things calmed down, Rudy discovered that the Seaford High flag had been stolen and has been held captive by Swathmore ever since. Kim tells Rudy that happened a long time ago and that since he is now an adult, he should just go over to the academy and get it, to which Rudy agrees. When he goes over to Swathmore Academy to get the flag back, he discovers that Teddy is now the headmaster of the academy, who refuses to give the flag back. Later, when Rudy tells the others the bad news, Jack, Milton, Jerry, and Eddie all agree to help Rudy get the flag back. Jack, Milton, and Jerry go to the academy, disguised as students there; however, their plan later backfires as their covers are blown one by one. Back at the dojo, Eddie has finished his float, a replica of the Screaming Log of Seaford. Jack then gets the idea to use the log to get the flag back. When Eddie arrives at the parade site with the log, Jack, Milton, Jerry, and Rudy, who have been hiding in the log, launch a sneak attack on the Swathmore students on their ship float. After a tough battle, the Wasabi Warriors manage to defeat them and rightfully reclaim the Seaford High flag. Guest stars: Tony Cavalero as Teddy Kavanagh, Katherine McNamara as Claire, Dennis Hemphill Jr. as Mr. Radler
28	7	"It Takes Two to Tangle"	Rob Schiller	Jim O'Doherty	June 11, 2012	211	0.46
Jack and Rudy head to a sensei and student tournament in San Francisco, but when they get there, they meet Rudy's rival Trent Darby, who thinks Rudy works at the hotel they are staying at and laughs when he hears he and Jack are competing. Rudy is frightened and wants to leave the hotel and not participate in the tournament and reveals to Jack that Trent ruined his life by repeatedly beating him, and Trent's life took off, while Rudy's did not. Jack gives Rudy a pep talk and tells him that there is nothing wrong with where he is and that he means everything to his students. Jack then tells Rudy that they are going to stay there and do the best that they can together, and Rudy agrees and regains his confidence. However, during training later, when Jack is not getting a move quite right, Rudy yells at him. Jack tells Rudy that he is doing the best that he can, but Rudy becomes more agitated and tells him that his best is not good enough and that he is an embarrassment. This upsets Jack, who walks away. Later, during the tournament, when Rudy sees Trent scold his student in much the same manner, he tells him that nobody should talk to anybody like that and realizes what he said to Jack was wrong. Trent's student does not care as Trent is just his sensei, not his friend, something that Rudy does not want between him and Jack as he wants to be both a sensei and a friend. Jack shows up as he is not quitter and finishes anything he starts. Rudy apologizes to Jack, who forgives him and tells him that, despite sometimes turning into a flaming nutcase, he knows that Rudy will always be there for him, and he will always be there for Rudy. Jack and Rudy end up not winning the tournament and get the lowest score on record after failing to perform the Wasabi Whip successfully, but they do not care. Guest stars: Hannah Leigh as Julie, Matt Mullins as Trent, Jaime Nakamura as Donnie Absent: Olivia Holt as Kim
29	8	"Buddyguards"	Sean Lambert	Glenn Farrington & Geoff Barbanell	June 18, 2012	213	0.62
Jack and Jerry want tickets to see their favorite band Kung Fu Lightning perform and meet their idol Izzy Gunnar; however, when Jerry accidentally lets a lot of people cut in front of him while Jack is in the bathroom, they lose their chance at getting the tickets and must find another way. Jerry messes up again when he accidentally hangs up on the DJ, who is giving away two tickets, while stressed out about trying to find the phone the DJ was calling from. Later, when Jack and Jerry are at Falafel Phil's, they notice that Izzy is also there and ask him if he will give them tickets, to which he agrees after he realizes they are fans of his. When Izzy leaves and forgets his phone, Jack and Jerry go to return it to him, but notice that he has been ambushed by a couple of men. Jack and Jerry quickly take out the men, and Izzy is so impressed and thankful that he makes them his bodyguards. Later, Jack and Jerry meet Izzy's band, but after Izzy leaves, Lars fires them from being his bodyguards and has them kicked out. Lars is upset about not being the lead despite being the one who started the band. Later, when Jack and Jerry see Lars letting the two men who attacked Izzy come into the studio, they realize that Lars is the one who hired the men to attack Izzy and that they have to sneak back into the studio. After sneaking in by hiding in a chest, while Izzy is performing, Jack and Jerry see one of the men on the railing above the stage trying to cut a metal rope so that the thunderbolt prop it is holding drops on Izzy. Jack goes to stop him as the other man shows up to try to help the man Jack is trying to stop, but Jerry does not let him. Jack and Jerry are able to defeat the men, but the metal rope snaps; however, Jerry is quickly able to save Izzy. After Izzy learns of what Lars has done, he fires him. Guest stars: Eric Tiede as Izzy, Tim Lacatena as Lars Absent: Olivia Holt as Kim
30	9	"Dojo Day Care"	Sean McNamara	Byron Kavanagh	June 25, 2012	212	0.66
After Principal Buckett expels Jerry for his shenanigans at school, Jerry overhears that he needs a babysitter for his baby son Byron so that he can attend the flamenco dancing finals. Jerry offers to babysit Byron at the best child daycare in Seaford, but wants to be unexpelled in exchange, to which a desperate Principal Buckett agrees. It is later revealed that the best daycare center in Seaford is the dojo, and Rudy is not happy about it and refuses to let Jerry babysit there; however, he quickly changes his tune when Principal Buckett shows up with Byron and asks who should be given the $100 check. However, things take a bad turn when Principal Buckett tells everyone that he put a notice on the faculty bulletin board about the dojo, leaving everyone to babysit a lot more children. Things take another bad turn when Jack and Jerry discover that Byron is missing and Jerry starts freaking out. Jack sees that Byron is outside with all of the construction going on to expand the mall, but when he and Jerry get outside, they cannot find him. Jack and Jerry see Byron sitting on a palette, but as they are about to get him, a construction crane lifts the palette up. Jack and Jerry climb up the support beams of a building being built in order to save Byron, and when they climb high enough, they find Byron again. Byron crawls off a support beam, but is saved by another beam being lifted up. Jack and Jerry climb higher and Jack jumps onto the beam to get Byron; however, when he does, Byron starts sliding off one side due to Jack's weight. Jack, who is hanging below the beam, is able to grab him, but he starts losing his grip; however, Jerry is able to get Byron from Jack, who quickly secures himself with his now free hand. Jack lowers Jerry and Byron back down to the ground, where Jerry gives Byron back to Principal Buckett, who has just returned from his flamenco dancing finals. Guest stars: Brooke Dillman as Joan, Jim Meskimen as Principal Buckett Absent: Olivia Holt as Kim
31	10	"Indiana Eddie"	Victor Gonzalez	J.B. Cook	July 16, 2012	202	0.77
It is the last day of school before summer vacation, and everyone gets their end-of-the-year career evaluations from their guidance counselors. Eddie is excited about his career evaluation, which says that he will be an archaeologist. Later, Eddie is talking to Rudy about how excited he is about his career evaluation and that he is going to spice it up by being a treasure hunter. Rudy is impressed and excited for Eddie and gives him a hat and bullwhip that Bobby Wasabi used in one of his classic movies in order to aid him on being a treasure hunter. Jack and the others walk in, and Jack is surprised that Eddie is still talking about his career evaluation and tells him that he told him that the career evaluations really do not mean anything. Kim tells Eddie that he comes from four generations of accountants, so she is surprised to hear that he is going through with archaeology. Milton tells Eddie that he is not exactly the explorer type, with which Jack, Jerry, and Kim agree. Eddie is not sure anymore and thinks the others are right and starts doubting himself. Rudy becomes upset and tells Jack, Milton, Jerry, and Kim that friends build each other up, not tear each other down. Everyone later realizes that Rudy is right and agrees to go exploring with Eddie, where they will set out to find three secret locations, with the last one containing a special treasure. The first location is at the bottom of Crescent Cove at the beach, while the second location is Kramer Woods. When the Wasabi Warriors reach the docks, their third destination, they are attacked by dockworkers, who know what they are looking for. A fight ensues, but the Wasabi Warriors are able to overpower the dockworkers and claim the treasure, which turns out to be a small rabbit figure. However, Eddie will always treasure it as it is a reminder about the adventure he went on with his friends, and Jack tells Eddie that he and the others will follow Eddie on any adventure he wants to go on from now on. Guest stars: Dan Ahdoot as Falafel Phil, Jeff Wolfe as Jimmy
32	11	"Kim of Kong"	Sean Lambert	David Bickel	July 23, 2012	209	0.77
Kim wants to try a change and spar with Jack instead of Milton because she wants to be challenged. Jack is not sure because he does not want to hurt her, but she insists and ends up winning the sparring match. When Jerry tells Jack that he did not see that coming, Jack tells him that sometimes the unexpected must be expected while clicking his tongue, winking, and pointing his index fingers outward, implying that he let Kim win, which Eddie quickly picks up on. Later, Jerry lets it slip out to Kim that Jack threw the match, which upsets her. Kim demands that Jerry tell her where Jack is, and he tells her that he is at the arcade. Kim goes to the arcade to confront Jack about letting her win, and he nervously reveals that he held back because she is a girl, which further upsets her as she wants a fair rematch. Jack is the number-one champion of the Immortal Warrior game at the arcade, where he goes by the name Thrasher, but that quickly changes when another player named Skull Ripper surpasses him. Jack quickly learns that Skull Ripper is Kim and that he will go head-to-head with her on Immortal Warrior. Later, the announcer wants Jack to throw the fight so that Kim can be on the cover in order for more girls to start playing Immortal Warrior, but Jack is conflicted. However, Jack later makes the decision to give it his all and ends up winning the competition, which impresses Kim as all she wanted was a fair fight. Guest stars: Brooke Dillman as Joan, Joey Luthman as Emmitt, Zach Selwyn as Nathan
33	12	"Kickin' It Old School"	Sean McNamara	David Bickel	September 10, 2012	214	0.38
Rudy is excited because he going to be inducted in the Seaford High Hall of Fame for his leadership and commitment to physical fitness and awarded a black tie pork chop dinner; however, plans change when Milton and Eddie discover that Rudy never technically completed high school due to missing five days of mandatory attendance in the ninth grade, making him ineligible for the Seaford High Hall of Fame. Rudy talks to the chairman of the hall of fame committee and asks him what he can do, but he says there is nothing that can be done; however, Rudy insists and is back at Seaford High for five days to make up for his absences. Things go wrong during dodgeball after the gym teacher Funderburk, who used to pick and has been picking on Rudy, throws a dodgeball so hard at Rudy that he faints. Later, in the cafeteria, Funderburk trips Rudy, making that the final straw for Rudy, who starts talking about dropping out. Later, Jack, Milton, and Eddie give Rudy a pep talk and tell him that they will help him get in the Seaford High Hall of Fame, which makes Rudy feel better, and he thanks them and tells them that it means a lot. The next day at gym class, Funderburk tells Rudy that he looked through his records and there was one gym challenge that he could not complete, and that will be his final exam. Rudy assumes it is rope climbing, which Funderburk ends up going with as Rudy's final exam. As Rudy is climbing the rope, Funderburk and his students try to knock Rudy off with dodgeballs, but Jack comes to his rescue and defends him while he climbs to the top and successfully rings the bell. Meanwhile, Phil introduces the Wasabi Warriors to his niece Mika, who Jerry develops a crush on. Jerry later asks Mika out on a date, but she rejects him. However, when Eddie tells Jerry that the whole school thinks he is in a relationship with Mika, Jerry loudly announces that he and Mika are going out. When Mika learns of this, she asks Phil for help in order to get revenge on Jerry and puts Jerry through a series of rituals that are made up to get back at him. Mika later reveals that all the rituals were fake, but this ends up impressing Jerry which in turn impresses Mika since he went through so much to be her boyfriend, so Mika asks Jerry if he wants to actually try dating, to which he agrees. Guest stars: Dan Ahdoot as Falafel Phil, Oana Gregory as Mika, Rachel Cannon as Bethany, Eric Nenninger as Funderburk Absent: Olivia Holt as Kim
34	13	"The Chosen One"	Sean Lambert	Byron Kavanagh	September 17, 2012	218	0.72
The Wasabi Warriors meet the legendary Shaolin Warriors, who invite them to their temple to train with them. They learn about an eternal flame that never goes out and meet Zang Lu, who must train them in the Shaolin way. Zang Lu shows the Wasabi Warriors the Path of Fire, a linear path of bricks heated by natural gas which a person walks on. The challenge is meant to block out pain and increase discipline. Later, the Shaolin Warriors give the Wasabi Warriors a demonstration of their Shaolin skills; while the performance goes well, the Shaolin Warriors are crashed into by Jerry after he intentionally passes gas near the eternal flame which explodes. This upsets Zang Lu, who tells Jerry that he and his friends must leave, but Grandmaster Po walks in, who says "he" is here to fulfill the prophecy, confusing the Wasabi Warriors. Yin Chen explains that it has been foretold that a dark cloud will threaten the temple, but that a great warrior will arrive to save it. Grandmaster Po states that the warrior is here now, and that warrior is Jerry, who Grandmaster Po says is The Chosen One. Zang Lu does not take well to the idea, who says that Jerry cannot be The Chosen One. In order to make sure that Jerry is The Chosen One, Grandmaster Po checks Jerry's neck to see if it has the three diamond mark, which it does. Later, while in the hot tub, Jerry overhears Zang Lu talking to someone about extinguishing two flames the next night and also sees that the eternal flame can be shut off. After Jerry and Zang Lu run into each other and Jerry leaves, Zang Lu discovers that the three diamond mark on Jerry's neck is not from a birthmark, but from a cheap necklace. The next day, Zang Lu summons everyone to tell them that Jerry is a liar and demonstrates this by wiping the three diamond mark on his neck with a cloth. Grandmaster Po tells Jerry that he has deceived them and that he and his friends are banished from the temple forever. Later, Jerry has a bad feeling about what he overheard and wants to go back to protect Grandmaster Po. At the temple, Jerry finds Grandmaster Po and tries to warn him, but he does not believe him; however Zang Lu shows up and admits that he must break his vow to the temple. Zang Lu explains that the temple sits on a mountain of natural gas worth millions, and that once Grandmaster Po is gone, he will be in control and sell the natural gas to make a fortune. Zang Lu attacks Grandmaster Po, easily overpowering him, so Jerry steps in to fight Zang Lu, only to be overpowered as well. Grandmaster Po has Jerry give him his hand to transfer over a mysterious power, which is later revealed to be friendship, giving Jerry the strength to fight. With this new power, Jerry is able to defeat Zang Lu, just as his friends show up. Grandmaster Po is thankful and tells Jerry that he and his friends are welcome at the temple anytime. Guest stars: James Ryen as Zang Lu, Gerald Okamura as Grandmaster Po, James Sie as Yin Chen, Derek Mio as Wan Chi
35	14	"Hit the Road Jack"	Sean Lambert	Jim O'Doherty	September 24, 2012	205	0.52
After seeing Jack's impressive skills during a tournament at the dojo, Tanaka offers Jack a scholarship at the Otai Academy in Japan; however, when Jack learns that the scholarship is for four years, he has to make the tough decision between going to Japan and staying at Seaford with his friends. Later, when Jack returns to the dojo to say goodbye, he notices that Milton, Jerry, Kim, and Eddie have replaced him. When the others leave, Kim stays with Jack and reminiscences with him over old photos he has in his locker. Later, during the goodbye party, Jack is upset because Kim is nowhere to be found and he has tried texting her to no avail and that time is running out as his father will be there any minute to pick him up. Jack then tells Milton, Jerry, and Eddie that he will miss them, they are the best friends he could ever ask for, and he loves them. Jack runs into Rudy outside and sits with him while waiting for his father. Jack asks Rudy if he will do him a favor a give a letter to Kim, which contains some things he wants her to know. Jack tells Rudy that the dojo will always be home, but Rudy reassures him that the scholarship is an opportunity of a lifetime. Jack confesses to Rudy that he cannot help to think that it will cost him everything he cares about and explains that by the time he gets back, what he and the others have in the dojo will not be there anymore. Rudy realizes that he has been too excited over what Jack was gaining that he was not thinking about what Jack was losing. Jack explains that both martial arts and his friends are very important to him, and if he goes to Japan, he will have one, but not the other; however, if he stays in Seaford, he will have both. Jack changes his mind and decides to stay in Seaford, which makes Rudy happy and the two share a hug. Kim shows up and Rudy gives her the letter Jack wanted him to give her. Kim tells Jack that she did the same thing and gives him the letter she wrote, but when Jack tells her he has changed his mind, they both give each other's letters back. Guest stars: Brooke Dillman as Joan, Wayne Dalglish as Frank, Brennan Mejia as Zane, Harrison Boxley as Sydney
36	15	"A Slip Down Memory Lane"	Jim O'Doherty	Adrienne Sterman	October 1, 2012	224	0.41
Jack is working on breaking the brick breaking record before he turns 15 the following week since he will no longer be eligible then. Milton and Jerry walk in, who are also trying to break records, with Jerry trying to break the record for world's longest armpit hair and Milton trying to break the yo-yo record for the two-handed synchronized 'round the world. However, when Milton demonstrates his yo-yoing, his yo-yos get stuck in Jerry's armpit hair, which is then ripped out, and Jerry screams out in pain and chases Milton out of the dojo in anger. Later, Kim gives Jack a bracelet she made to help him break the record; Jack thinks it is a good luck bracelet, but Kim says it is more of something else. Jack takes this to mean a friendship bracelet, which Kim agrees with, and Jack sarcastically mentions how they are now officially friends. Kim becomes annoyed and starts to tell Jack that she thinks of them as more than just friends, but she cannot get the "friends" part out. Jack is confused and asks Kim to elaborate, but she nervously responds that the bracelet is just a dumb bracelet and starts to leave. Jack tells her to wait and starts to follow her, but as he does, he slips on a stack of bo staffs and hits his head. Milton, Jerry, Kim, and Eddie run over to Jack to make sure that he is okay, which he is, but he has suffered some memory loss. A doctor later takes a look at Jack, who he says will be fine and also says that everyone should talk about the memories he has forgotten to try to speed up the recovery. Everyone then tries to help Jack remember, starting with the wall he crashed through when he first came to the dojo; however, when everyone later starts arguing over the best way to help him, Jack leaves the dojo. Rudy tells everyone that they must find him because he has no idea who he is and he is out on the streets of Seaford all by himself. Milton, Jerry, Kim, and Eddie find Jack at Falafel Phil's, and Jack apologizes and tells them that he just needed a little bit of time alone. Milton, Jerry, Kim, and Eddie continue to talk about the group's memories in an effort to help Jack recover his memory. Rudy shows up outside Falafel Phil's, who tells the others that the judge from the Burgess Book of World Records is going to arrive soon and continues to try to think of a way that Jack can perform. Later, Rudy arrives with Winston Burgess, the judge who will be reviewing Jack; Rudy asks for more time, but Winston Burgess tells him that he does not have a lot of time. Jack does not think he can do this, but he does not want the let the team down, so he decides that, despite not remembering his friends or Seaford, he will go through with it after noting that from everything the others have told him, the team does not give up, and he is not going to start now. As Jack gets up on the stage and is getting ready to karate chop the bricks, everything comes back to him and he karate chops the bricks with ease. Jack is now officially listed as the Under 15 World Record Holder for Brick Breaking, and his friends are happy for him and want to celebrate at Falafel Phil's. Kim asks Jack if he remembers anything that she said after she gave him the bracelet, to which he responds no. This appears to make Kim happy; however, as she is leaving, Jack puts on the bracelet and smiles. Guest stars: Brooke Dillman as Joan, Joel McCrary as Bobby Wasabi, Wayne Dalglish as Frank
37	16	"Wedding Crashers"	Eric Dean Seaton	Byron Kavanagh	October 8, 2012	215	0.57
Bobby Wasabi tells everyone that he is lonely, and Rudy comes up with a plan to help him get a girlfriend. Later, at Falafel Phil's, Bobby meets Leona, a huge martial arts fan who insisted on meeting him, and the two go on a date. When Bobby returns from his date, he tells everyone that it went well and that in two days, he will marry Leona, which shocks everyone. Rudy tells him that he cannot just jump into something like this, but after Bobby tells him that he can be his best man, he quickly changes his tune. Bobby also tells Milton and Mika that they will plan his wedding. Later, while preparing for the wedding, Rudy meets a beautiful lady, who tells him he has the most amazing eyes, but when Rudy starts to tell her the same thing, she disappears. Rudy later learns that the woman he met is Leona. Later, Jack accidentally shoots Jerry with numbing darts with a prop from one of Bobby's movies. When Jerry falls from not being able to feel his legs, Jack quickly goes to make sure he is okay; this coincidentally hides both of them behind a folding screen as Leona and her ninjas enter the room. Jack and Jerry overhear Leona talking about how once she and Bobby are married, she will eliminate him so that she can take all of his money. When Jerry accidentally shoots Leona with a dart, she has her ninjas attack him and Jack. Jack forgets Jerry cannot stand on his own and tries to attack the ninjas, letting Jerry fall; when Jack goes to help him, the ninjas surround them and tie them up. Leona reveals that she will kill Bobby by giving him a wedding ring containing black widow venom, which will soak into his skin. Jack and Jerry later manage to break free and disguise themselves so that they can save Bobby. During the wedding ceremony, when Milton asks if there are any objections to Bobby and Leona getting married, Rudy objects to the marriage and pronounces his love to Leona and asks her to marry him, but she nods no. As Bobby is about to seal his vow with a kiss, his bride is revealed to be Jerry in disguise, freaking everyone out. Jerry tells Bobby what Leona is planning to do, but Leona walks in and denies everything. She tells Bobby that she loves him with all her heart and to put on the wedding ring; however, one of her ninjas kicks the wedding ring away before Bobby is able to put it on, and the ninja reveals themselves to be Jack in disguise. A fight ensues between the Wasabi Warriors and Leona and her ninjas. The Wasabi Warriors are able to defeat Leona and her ninjas and have Leona arrested. Later, when Bobby admits that he rushed things because he was afraid of being alone, Jack assures him that he will never be alone and that he will always have the Wasabi Warriors. Bobby is touched and says that while he lost a wife, he has a family. Special guest star: Denise Richards as Leona Guest stars: Joel McCrary as Bobby Wasabi, Oana Gregory as Mika Absent: Olivia Holt as Kim
38	17	"Wazombie Warriors"	Sean Lambert	David Bickel & Byron Kavanagh	October 15, 2012	223	0.57
Kim falls asleep while watching Attack of the Killer Zompires with her friends at the movie theater and dreams that she is in place similar to that of the Zompires movie. Kim sees Jerry and asks him what is going on, but when he turns around, she discovers that he is a zompire, a combination of a zombie and a vampire. Jerry attacks Kim, and she fights back to protect herself; while she is fighting, Jack and Rudy show up and save her. Jack and Rudy take Kim back to their base, where Rudy explains that they have been at war with the zompires ever since thousands of zompires came crawling up from the sewers of Seaford, while Jack explains that they multiply by burping into humans' faces. Kim also meets Lindsay, Jack's girlfriend in this dream, as well as Eddie, the rebel leader. A letter is received at the base, which Jack reads and says it is from the professor, who wants them to come to his secret lab as he has found a way to turn the zompires back into humans. Everyone arrives at the lab, where Professor Milton reveals the Krupnick Coil, a super powerful refractometer that emits a light so intense that it pierces the zompires' inner darkness, turning them back into humans. However, Jerry shows up unexpectedly, and Jack cannot understand how he found the professor's secret underground lab. Jerry tells him to ask his girlfriend, who reveals that she did it for them and made a deal with the zompires. Jerry double-crosses Lindsay and burps in her face, turning her into a zompire. As things are looking bad, Jack turns on dance music, Jerry's weakness, which distracts the zompires long enough for him and the others to escape to a safe location. Later, the professor reveals that a crystal diode is all that is left of the refractometer, and Kim asks if there is anything that they can do with it. The professor says there is a prototype coil, but it is at the school, the darkest, scariest, and most evil place on Earth. Along the way to the school, Eddie is turned into a zompire and the team recruits Phil. When they arrive at the school, they run into Joan, who burps on Rudy and turns him into a zompire. Phil tries to cover Jack, Milton, and Kim as they go to find and set up the prototype coil. Jack, Milton, and Kim find the coil, but Jerry also finds them; however, Jack and Kim are able to defeat him with a falafel ball, one of his other weaknesses which upsets his stomach. Lindsay then shows up and turns Jack and Milton into zompires, though Milton seems to be able to hold the effects off and retreats. It is now up to Kim to finish setting up the coil while also fending off Jack and Lindsay. Kim manages to turn the coil on and turn Jack back into a human after Jack and Lindsay get into an argument and are distracted. When Jack is thankful to Kim for saving him, Kim tells him that she was not going to let him spend eternity with Lindsay and that he belongs with her. As Kim says that, she wakes up and realizes it was all a dream. Guest stars: Brooke Dillman as Joan, Dan Ahdoot as Falafel Phil, Murray Gershenz as Mr. Rosenbaum, Sadie Calvano as Lindsay
39	18	"Sole Brothers"	Phill Lewis	Frank O. Wolff	October 22, 2012	217	0.60
Jerry tells Jack that Doctor Kicks is hiring, and Jack is excited and says that they have to get jobs there. Later, Jack explains that they have always talked about working there together, so he tells Jerry that they have to agree that Doctor Kicks either hires both of them or neither of them if things go well. Jack and Jerry talk to the manager Max, who ends up hiring Jack, but Jack tells him that he has to also hire Jerry. Max is impressed by Jack's bond with Jerry and hires Jerry as well. Later, Max reveals that their store was just chosen to launch NBA superstar Kyrie Irving's new shoe on Friday. Later, when Max promotes Jerry to assistant manager and fires Jack, Jerry does not honor his pact with Jack, which upsets Jack. Later, Jack meets Kyrie at Falafel Phil's and asks him if he met his "friend", the new assistant manager, during his Doctor Kicks visit; however, when he says that he met Jack, Jack says that his name is Jerry. Kyrie explains that he gave Jerry a pair of shoes, and Jerry had him autograph them for Jack. Jack starts to feel bad and realizes that he needs to go and talk to Jerry; however, when he arrives at Doctor Kicks with Kyrie, he sees Jerry tied up while robbers are stealing the shoes that Kyrie Irving signed earlier. Jack has Kyrie untie Jerry while he starts dealing with the robbers; Kyrie unties Jerry and the three are able to take the robbers down. Jerry has a pretty good idea on who one of the robbers is, who he unmasks and is revealed to be Max. Jerry explains that Max fired Jack because he saw him as a threat and promoted him to assistant manager so he would take the blame for the missing shoes. Meanwhile, Rudy reveals that he and Bethany, the health teacher at Seaford High, are in a relationship; however, their relationship is strained when Rudy lies to Bethany. Rudy tries to make it up to her by telling her that he climbed up to the top of Mount Seaford and carved a heart with their initials in it. This makes Bethany happy, who wants to climb the mountain with Rudy to see it for herself; however, Rudy is hesitant on doing so. This turns out to be another lie, and when Rudy and Bethany reach the top, he tries to tell her the truth, but Milton and Kim show up and reveal the heart he was talking about. However, Rudy tells Bethany the truth and tells her that Milton and Kim carved the heart and that he only lied to her because he likes her so much and was scared of losing her. Rudy promises to never lie again and Bethany forgives him. Special guest star: Kyrie Irving as himself Guest stars: Oana Gregory as Mika, Rachel Cannon as Bethany, Michael Dunn as Max
40	19	"All the President's Friends"	Eric Dean Seaton	J.B. Cook	October 29, 2012	210	0.50
Jack returns from his family reunion in Colorado and is wondering why everyone is dressed in a strange fashion, so Milton explains everything that went on at the school after he left for Colorado in flashbacks. In the cafeteria, Milton is running for school president against Frank; however, Jerry shows up and reveals that he is also running for school president. Milton is upset at Jerry and tells him that he cannot run for school president because he is running for school president. In order to help him win, Jerry makes Eddie his campaign manager. Later, at the campaign, Milton gives his speech and explains that the last time the students voted for Frank, they did it so that he would not beat them up; however, he beat them up, anyway. He then states that the dark days of fear are over and that the dawn of change is upon them, which is well-received by everyone, who gives Milton a nice round of applause. Jerry is not sure if he can do this and decides to play dirty and tell everyone that Milton does not shower after gym class. Jerry and Frank are close to each other in votes, while Milton is noticeably behind them; however, as things are looking bad, other boys who do not shower show up and vote for Milton. This puts Milton in the lead, just as the polls close, making Milton the new school president; however, Milton starts letting the power go to his head and turns into Abraham Lincoln, which causes Frank to start hatching a plan to overthrow him. Meanwhile, Rudy has been asked to direct Romeo and Juliet at the Seaford High Community Theater and makes Kim his assistant director and Bobby Wasabi and Joan his Romeo and Juliet. Rudy does not like the classic version of the play and wants to spice things up; however, when Bobby and Joan cannot get their parts right and get into an argument with each other and Rudy, Kim insists that the play be changed back to the classic version, to which Rudy agrees. Later, Rudy starts regretting his decision when Vic Deblaze falls asleep during opening night; however, things spice up when Frank and his friends show up to overthrow Milton and Jerry and Eddie show up to help Milton. A fight ensues and things look bad at first, but Milton and Jerry are able to hold their own fairly well, with Kim later joining in on the fight, and the three are able to defeat Frank and his friends. This ends the flashbacks, and Jerry apologizes to Milton and tells him that he should not have used his locker room secret against him. Milton tells Jerry that what matters is that he was there when he was about to be attacked and thanks him. Guest stars: Joel McCrary as Bobby Wasabi, Brooke Dillman as Joan, Hannah Leigh as Julie, Wayne Dalglish as Frank
41	20	"New Jack City"	Sean Lambert	Joel McCrary & Itai Grunfeld	November 5, 2012	219	0.76
The Bobby Wasabi Dojo is one of the dojos selected to compete in the annual California Battle of the Dojos, which Jack will be representing; however, the Black Dragons are also selected to compete. Later, Carson Hunter returns to Seaford, who everyone but Jack seems to know. Rudy explains to Jack that Carson was one of his first students and that he was the youngest student in California to earn his black belt. Jack starts becoming jealous of Carson when he sees that his friends, including Rudy, appear to be more impressed by him. Later, Jack tells Kim that he cannot go to Rockchella with her because he has to practice for the tournament and gives her his ticket so that she can take a friend; however, when Kim later returns and Jack discovers that she took Carson with her, he becomes even more jealous. When Carson is impressed by Jack's bo staff skills, he tells him that he is probably the best man for the job; Jack is confused and tells him that he is the only one at the dojo who works the bo staff. However, Carson reveals that he also works the bo staff, and Jack challenges him to a bo staff sparring match, with the winner being the one who will represent the dojo. Carson is able to win the sparring match after his bo staff snaps Jack's bo staff in half, much to everyone's shock. Later, while at Falafel Phil's, Jack talks to his friends about how he cannot stop thinking about his loss because he feels that something is not quite right. He has been doing martial arts for years, and bo staffs do not just snap and shatter like that. Jack starts to feel like Carson could have possibly cheated and that his bo staff could have been weighted. Later, Jack confronts Carson, who quickly admits that he used a weighted bo staff. Jack threatens to tell everyone, but Carson tells him he will just look like a sore loser. Later, during the tournament, in a surprise turn of events, Jack has joined the Black Dragons, much to everyone's shock. Milton, Jerry, Kim, and Eddie confront Jack, but he tells them that Carson is a cheater and that none of them believed him, including Rudy. Jack further explains that if Carson is the kind of person they want at the dojo, he is out, but he wants a fair fight. When Carson fakes an equipment failure and calls a timeout, Kim discovers him putting something on his hand and quickly tells Jack that he was right and that she wants him defeated. Carson's cheating gets him the upperhand at first, but Jack is able to defeat him fair and square. Rudy notices what Carson was using to cheat and bans him from the dojo. Everyone then apologizes to Jack, and Rudy asks him if there is any way that they can convince him to come back to the dojo, and Jack only has one thing to say to everyone: "Wasabi?" Guest stars: Ian Reed Kesler as Sensei Ty, Booboo Stewart as Carson
42	21	"Karate Games"	Rob Schiller	J.B. Cook	November 12, 2012	222	0.93
After Jack and Kim stop an escaped prisoner who has broken out of the Seaford Correctional Facility, they make headlines in the news. Action movie star Dolph Gruber shows up and wants Jack and Kim to be in his movie called The Karate Games, a martial arts movie which involves an epic battle for survival. Jack and Kim both agree to be in his movie and later head off to Hollywood. Things take an unexpected turn when Jack and Kim are living in the movie rather than acting in it and must reach the Hollywood sign, all while surviving various obstacles along the way. After their first fight, Jack notices that Kim is missing, but Kim is able to scream for help, and Jack follows her voice and finds her tied to and hanging from a tree. Jack has to deal with Brazilian tree fighters while trying to free Kim from the ropes. Jack is able to defeat the tree fighters and frees Kim. After being chased by dogs, Jack and Kim reach the Hollywood sign, where they discover that they must fight each other as only one of them can be a movie star. Jack refuses to fight Kim because of their friendship, but Kim starts attacking him and manages to kick him off the side of the sign platform. Dolph shows up to congratulate Kim; however, Kim reveals that her and Jack's fight was all a ploy as Jack reappears. Jack and Kim fight Dolph and are able to defeat him. Guest stars: Joel McCrary as Biker Dummy, Wayne Dalglish as Frank, David S. Lee as Dolph, Matt Cook as Wink
43	22	"Kickin' It on Our Own"	Sean Lambert	Jim O'Doherty	November 19, 2012	220–221	0.87
When Rudy gets a phone call from his uncle that he is coming to visit him, Rudy is nervous and explains that when he graduated Seaford High, his uncle gave him money to go to business school, but he invested it in the dojo instead. All these years, Rudy has let his uncle think that he is this big successful businessman and he is afraid that when his uncle arrives at the dojo, he will find out that Rudy is a joke. Jack and the others agree that they have to help Rudy and ask Joan if they can borrow the keys to her boss' office, who is out of town. Later, Rudy's uncle arrives at the office and is proud of the successful man Rudy has become. Later, things take an interesting turn when Rudy tells the others that his uncle offered him a job to work with him. Everyone tells Rudy that it is an amazing opportunity and encourages him to go; however, this means that Rudy must leave the dojo, but not wanting to miss a great opportunity, Rudy makes the decision to go. Bobby Wasabi later reveals that he has sold the dojo to Ty, the only other sensei in Seaford. Ty turns the dojo into a Black Dragons dojo, which does not settle well with the Wasabi Warriors, but they pretend to be happy for Rudy's sake. However, they later cannot take it anymore and quit, and even though they promise not to, they eventually end up going their separate ways. It is now three months later, and things take another interesting turn when Rudy's uncle wants Rudy to run a new park he is opening up in Taiwan. Before Rudy goes, he calls Jack and asks him to gather the group because has some big news to tell them in person. However, when Jack finds and tries to gather everyone, they are all too busy, and along the way, Jack discovers that Kim has a new boyfriend named Brett. However, when Jack is later waiting for Rudy at Falafel Phil's, the others show up, who have realized that they miss things the way they used to be. Rudy arrives, who tells everyone that he got a promotion and is moving to Taiwan; while everyone is sad inside, they act all happy for him and congratulate him and spend the night celebrating. Rudy realizes that he has to get packing, and he and the others share one last "Wasabi!" and hug. Rudy decides to pay a visit to the Black Dragons Dojo, where he learns from Ty that Jack and the others left three months ago. Rudy gathers everyone together and is upset at them for lying, and Jack explains that they did not want him to miss out on a great opportunity because of them. Rudy then asks if they would come back if he were their sensei in that dojo, to which they all respond yes, so Rudy decides to fight Ty and his students to get his dojo back. However, they must first get back into shape as they are all rusty, and Milton asks his aunt to help them. After some hard work and dedication, everyone is now in shape and ready to take on Ty and his students. Later, during the matches, Kim is able to defeat her opponent; however, Jack becomes distracted by Kim's boyfriend Brett, and his match ends in a tie. When it is Rudy's turn, Ty reveals that he hired new sensei Kofi Kingston, who Rudy will be taking on instead. Rudy is beaten so bad during the match that the others encourage him to quit because they do not want to see him get injured anymore. However, Rudy refuses to give up and manages to defeat Kofi. Rudy's uncle shows up, who tells Rudy that he has already been told the truth; however, rather than being disappointed, he is proud and tells Rudy that he made a great investment by buying the dojo. Special guest star: George Wendt as Uncle Blake Guest stars: Brooke Dillman as Joan, Joel McCrary as Bobby Wasabi, Ian Reed Kesler as Sensei Ty, Wayne Dalglish as Frank, Evan Hofer as Randy, Katherine McNamara as Claire, Jillian Michaels as Jillian, WWE Superstar Kofi Kingston as himself, Murray Gershenz as Mr. Rosenbaum, Bunny Levine as Mrs. Rosenbaum, Jimmy Deshler as Brett Favors
44	23	"Oh, Christmas Nuts!"	Bill Shea	Matthew Edsall & Jana Godshall	December 3, 2012	216	0.65
Jack, Milton, and Jerry want a road demon for Christmas; however, Rudy tells them that Christmas is not about receiving presents, but it is about being filled with the spirit of Christmas. Rudy insists that Jack, Milton, and Jerry come with him as he is going to teach them a lesson about the true spirit of Christmas. He takes them to Santa's Village, a place that raises money for needy children, and tells them that volunteering is a great way to get in touch with the Christmas spirit. Jack, Milton, Jerry, and Rudy meet Tinsel, and Rudy tells him that the boys want to volunteer; however, Tinsel tells him that they do not need more help. Rudy questions how they could not need more volunteers and demands to see someone in upper management. Tinsel tries to reject them again, but Santa tells them that they can always find room for boys who are willing to volunteer. Tinsel puts Milton to work on gift wrap duty, while Jack and Jerry manage a game called Snowball Toss. Later, Milton gets more wrapping paper inside the gingerbread shop; when he comes back out, Tinsel confronts him about why he was in there and takes the wrapping paper. Later, Joan comes running into the dojo and tells Jack, Milton, Jerry, and Rudy that the whole mall is on lockdown because somebody stole Christmas and explains that a bag of presents was taken from Santa's Village. Everyone hears strange noises coming from one of their lockers, and when Rudy opens it, a bunch of presents fall out, including a road demon. Knowing that Jack, Milton, and Jerry wanted a road demon, Rudy is quick to point the finger at them and Joan bans them from the mall, which includes the dojo. At the police station, Jack insists that he, Milton, and Jerry did not take the toys, and when Joan steps out, Jerry notices that the remote for the road demon is nowhere to be found. Jack figures out that somebody must have used the remote control from outside the dojo when Joan walked in and that he, Milton, and Jerry were set up. Milton suspects Tinsel and explains that he has been acting really weird and that when he went to get wrapping paper from the gingerbread house, Tinsel grabbed it away from him like it was gold. Jack decides that they must get inside the gingerbread house to figure out what is so special about the wrapping paper. Later, at Santa's Village, Jack, Jerry, and Rudy start a snowball fight to distract Tinsel, Santa, and the rest of their crew, while Milton sneaks in and grabs the wrapping paper, which he successfully manages to do. Back at the police station, Jack, Milton, and Jerry show Joan that the wrapping paper contains counterfeit bills on the inside; after that, everyone heads back to Santa's Village. Jack, Milton, Jerry, Rudy, and Joan confront Tinsel and Santa, and Santa orders his crew to attack them, but Jack, Milton, Jerry, and Rudy are able to quickly subdue them and have them arrested. Guest stars: Joel McCrary as Bobby Wasabi, Dan Ahdoot as Falafel Phil, Brooke Dillman as Joan, Guilford Adams as Tinsel, Brendan Patrick Connor as Santa

=== Season 3 (2013–2014) ===
No. overall	No. in season	Title	Directed by	Written by	Original release date	Prod. code	U.S. viewers (millions)
45	1	"Spyfall"	Sean Lambert	Jim O'Doherty	April 1, 2013	301	0.92
Hachmachistan has plans to use the port of Seaford for all of its American trading and is holding a royal reception the next night at the Seafort Tower. Prince Yuval arrives to visit Phil; however, Jack becomes jealous when Kim starts going head over heels for him. Later, Jack stops and catches a man who breaks into Falafel Phil's and discovers a backpack containing a hologram message from a woman. The woman warns that Prince Yuvan is in grave danger from Phil, who has been posing for several years as a falafel maker who would not a hurt fly and is actually a dangerous hit man, though she never states the man's name herself. The woman continues to explain that Phil was seen buying a toxic vapor by their surveillance team and that if the vapor is released at the royal reception, the prince and everyone attending will be eliminated. Jack is confused as it does not make any sense, but later decides to take the warning seriously and goes to the tower. Due to heightened security, Jack must scale the outside of the tower and enter via an air vent on the side of the tower located on the 86th floor, using a pair of super high-tech sticky gloves that were also found in the backpack. After a little trouble along the way, Jack manages to find and enter through the air vent and get into the air duct system. Later, Jack drops into the bathroom via an air vent, where he finds Phil, who has regained consciousness, and confronts him; however, he quickly realizes that Phil is not the bad guy when Phil tells him that he does not know what is going on and was attacked by a man wearing a mask that looked just like him. Jack realizes that the hit man must be a master of disguise and is using Phil's face to get close to the prince. He also learns that after the prince signs the trade agreement, Phil is supposed to give him the big key and realizes that the hit man must have placed the toxic vapor into a duplicate key. Later, as the Phil lookalike activates the duplicate key to explode, Jack shows up and has Kim throw the key out of the window. A fight simultaneously ensues between Jack and the Phil lookalike, but Jack is quickly able to defeat him. Later, when Yuvan asks Kim to be his princess after Jack has saved the day, Kim is flattered, but tells him that she is not cut out for the whole royalty thing, which makes Jack happy. Guest stars: Brooke Dillman as Joan, Dan Ahdoot as Falafel Phil, Dan Ahdoot as Imposter Phil, Scott Dunn as Prince
46	2	"Dueling Dojos"	Sean Lambert	Byron Kavanagh	April 8, 2013	302	0.56
Grandmaster Po leaves Rudy in charge of babysitting his nephew Sam, and Rudy in turn leaves the others in charge of Sam while he goes out and has fun. However, things turn out to not be so pleasant when the Wasabi Warriors discover that Sam is a mischievous child who likes to cause trouble. Later, to help alleviate some pressure off Rudy, Jack and Jerry offer to be in charge of the dojo, while Rudy takes care of Sam. Rudy is hesitant at first, but quickly gives them the keys when he hears something break. Later, tensions start running high between Jack and Jerry when Jerry is upset at Jack for not listening to any of his ideas. Jack calls Jerry's ideas dumb, which upsets Jerry, who wants no part of the dojo with Jack in charge and leaves. Later, Jack discovers that Jerry has opened up his own dojo with his new partner Phil called Judo Jerry's, which is being run inside of Falafel Phil's. Jerry later shows up at the Bobby Wasabi Dojo and steals Jack's students after making up a lie about what happened to a student Jack was training; in order to get revenge, Jack has Joan go to Falafel Phil's & Judo Jerry's and tell Jerry that operating a dojo inside of a falafel restaurant is a violation of one of the codes. Joan threatens to take anyone on the premises into custody, forcing Jerry's students to leave him. Jack shows up and when Jerry tells him that cannot stand to see a better dojo, Jack calls Jerry's dojo a joke. Jerry tells Jack that they should have a tournament, and the winner gets to run the Bobby Wasabi Dojo their way, to which Jack agrees. Although Jack is only left with Joan and Jerry is only left with Phil. Later, as the two dojos are preparing to battle each other, Jerry shows up and notices that Jack's Pyramid of Discipline is still on the wall, which is where Jerry had hung a photo earlier of him and the team after he won a ribbon. Jerry confronts Jack, but Jack reveals that he had it enlarged and was going to hang it up before Jerry quit. Jack apologizes to Jerry for calling his ideas dumb and admits that some of his ideas were good. Jack further apologizes by telling Jerry that he got carried away because he has always dreamed of running a dojo and that he should not have disrespected him. Jack and Jerry make up and share a hug and agree to call off the tournament so nobody gets hurt. Meanwhile, after Sam has caused trouble all day, he and Rudy are waiting for Grandmaster Po to pick Sam up. Rudy asks Sam why he is such a troublemaker, and Sam reveals that he has never had a family before. Rudy tells Sam just how important families are and offers to let Sam stay with him, which Sam happily accepts. Guest stars: Brooke Dillman as Joan, Dan Ahdoot as Falafel Phil, Gerald Okamura as Grandmaster Po, Rio Mangini as Sam
47	3	"Glove Hurts"	Rob Schiller	Geoff Barbanell	April 15, 2013	303	0.41
Derek Tanner from Techtronic Labs is a special guest judge at this year's annual Seaford High Invention Fair, and Milton reveals that Derek is his father's boss. Jack and Jerry want to be a part of Milton's project in order to receive credit since they did not do theirs, and Milton reluctantly agrees. Milton presents his invention The Corn Coddlers, a pair of gloves that increases hand strength, to Derek. Derek is impressed and wants to know how Milton increase the strength of the human hand tenfold. After Milton explains it, Derek is further impressed and invites Jack, Milton, and Jerry on a VIP tour of Techtronic Labs and tells them that they won the invention fair. Later, when Derek realizes Milton's genius, he tells him that he could be the next Derek Tanner, which makes Milton happy, but Derek warns Milton to be careful that nobody takes advantage of his brilliant mind, including his friends Jack and Jerry, who he says are nothing more than parasites. Later, Jack and Jerry check out a restricted room, where they discover inventions that could prove dangerous, but Derek catches them and bans them for life. Later, Milton is mad at Jack and Jerry for almost ruining the most important day of his life and embarrassing him in front of his new friend Derek. Jack explains that there is something off about Derek, who has a drawing of a weaponized suit which the gloves are a part of, but Milton does not believe him and tells him and Jerry that Derek was right about them being parasites. Jack is upset and tells Milton that he has become a real jerk after spending only one day with Derek, but Milton tells them that Derek has hired him, much to their shock. Milton further explains that through Techtronic's work study program, he can finish school while working there, surrounded by people who actually appreciate him, and leaves. Later, Derek takes Milton into the restricted area, where he tells Milton to try on his gloves as Derek has made some modifications to them to increase their strength. Derek then starts to show his true colors when he tells Milton that in order to make the most money, they sell illegal weapons to bad people. Milton starts to realize that Jack and Jerry were right and wants to quit, but Derek blackmails him by threatening to hurt his father if he quits. Later, Milton shows up at the dojo and tells Jack and Jerry that he is leaving as Derek has forbidden him from being there. Milton explains that Derek is forcing him to make evil and dangerous weapons, and if he does not, something horrible will happen to his father. Later, when Jack, Milton, and Jerry show up at Techtronic Labs to get the gloves from the restricted area as evidence for the police, they discover they are not there, and Milton figures Derek must have known they were coming. When they exit the restricted area, they run into Derek, who has the gloves on. Jack and Jerry try to fight Derek, but are overpowered by the gloves. As Derek picks up Milton and tries to destroy him, Jack kicks him in the leg, which makes him lose his balance and slip out of one of the gloves. Milton uses this to his advantage and puts the glove on, and when Milton and Derek's fists meet, the gloves overpower each other and explode. Later, Milton apologizes to Jack and Jerry for getting carried away and explains that he forgot who he was and wanted so badly to be the next Derek Tanner. Jack forgives him and tells him that he and Jerry are just glad to have the old Milton Krupnick back. Guest stars: Rio Mangini as Sam, Byrne Offutt as Milton's Dad, Andrew Ableson as Derek Tanner, Jill Alexander as Miss Green, Bill Chott as Barnabus Absent: Olivia Holt as Kim
48	4	"The Sub Sinker"	Sean Lambert	Joel McCrary	April 29, 2013	305	0.68
When Jerry "The Sub Sinker" Martinez drives off another substitute teacher, Principal Funderburk makes Milton a substitute teacher. Jerry tries to break Milton with his tricks, but Milton knows all of his tricks. Milton then tells the class that he is giving a chapter test tomorrow, and he thinks that Jerry can pass it. Jerry is surprised by this, but Milton reassures him that he believes in him. Later, during the test, a spitball hits Milton, and he automatically assumes Jerry is the culprit and drags him by the ear to Funderburk's office. Funderburk later reveals that he has expelled Jerry, which confuses Milton. Jerry walks in after hearing the conversation and says he should not have been expelled because he was not the one who shot the spitball. Jerry confides in Milton that he was not afraid to take the test because he took his advice and studied for it and that he knows who shot the spitball. Jerry reveals that the spitball was no ordinary spitball and is able to explain what happened using complex mathematics. He accuses Albert of using his clarinet to shoot the spitball and that he used the fan he turned on when he faked hot flashes to redirect the spitball toward Milton. Jerry proves his hypothesis by setting up the same conditions as when Milton was shot at and shoots a spitball toward the fan, which redirects it to the classroom skeleton. Albert admits it was him and later explains that the reason he did it is because Milton is always so perfect. Funderburk tells Jerry that his expulsion is canceled and Albert to go to his office. Milton starts to doubt himself after he did not believe Jerry when he told the truth and wonders what kind of a friend he is, but Jerry reassures him that he is a great friend because he believed in him and got him to study, and nobody has ever done that before. Thanks to Milton, Jerry tells Funderburk that he is going to retire his Sub Sinker persona. Guest stars: Rachel Cannon as Ms. Applebaum, Eric Nenninger as Principal Funderburk, Evan Hofer as Randy, Harrison Boxley as Sidney, Jimmy Bellinger as Albert
49	5	"Meet the McKrupnicks"	Sean Lambert	J.J. Wall	May 6, 2013	304	0.62
Milton takes his friends to his home country Scotland, just in time for the Great Games. Milton explains that the Great Games are a friendly competition between the McKrupnicks and the McCrarys to commemorate the end of the feud between the two families. Milton's grandfather Grandpa McKrupnick explains that the feud was over a McCrary coming onto McKrupnick land and stealing their only donkey, and Milton adds that a 100 years ago, the two families finally made peace. Later, during the feast celebration, Milton makes a speech about how the two families have come together and have forgotten their differences; however, it goes wrong when Milton says that a donkey was stolen from them by a McCrary. This upsets Grandpa McCrary, who wants to reignite the feud, but Milton tells him that there cannot be another 100-year feud; instead, Grandpa McCrary decides that whichever family loses the games shall be banished from the valley forever. There are three challenges in the game, and Kim takes on Megan in the first challenge, but ends up losing, while Jack takes on Clammer in the second challenge and manages to win. In the final challenge, Milton figures out how he can beat Angus, one of the strongest people in the McCrarys. The rules do not say that the boulder must be carried, just that it must pass the finish line. Jack and Kim are confused, but Milton explains that it is a simple matter of physics. If Milton can get the boulder off the pedestal, inertia will carry it across the finish line thanks to the law of physics. Milton's strategy works for the most part, but his boulder stops just short of the finish line, and he must push it the rest of the way. However, when Milton sees that Angus' leg is stuck underneath his boulder after he drops it from exhaustion, Milton decides to help Angus. Angus is thankful and says they should both cross the finish line together, which makes the final challenge a tie, but Grandpa McCrary says that the McKrupnicks must leave the valley. However, Angus says that is not happening, and Milton says that the two families are stronger when they are together than when they are apart. Both sides agree that any bad blood remaining should be buried forever. Guest stars: Michael Earl Reid as Grandpa McKrupnick, Vernon Wells as Grandpa McCrary, Rock Anthony as Angus McCrary, Hannah McIalwain as Megan McCrary
50	6	"Witless Protection"	Sean Lambert	J.J. Wall	June 17, 2013	309	0.58
After witnessing a robbery, the Wasabi Warriors discover that the robbery was led by Benny the Blade, a robber that the police have been trying to arrest for years, but nobody has been brave enough to point the finger at him. The Wasabi Warriors go down to the police station to identify the suspect, but it does not go quite as planned when Jerry accidentally lowers the two-way glass and Benny sees Rudy pointing the finger at him. Later, while watching the news, the Wasabi Warriors see that when Benny arrives at the courthouse for his hearing, he manages to escape and tells Rudy that he will be looking for him and his students. As a result, the Wasabi Warriors are placed into witness protection and sent to live on a farm temporarily, where they must stay completely off the grid until Benny is captured and arrested. The Wasabi Warriors meet Farmer Pratchett and start doing chores around the farm in order to blend in. Rudy tries to milk a cow, but realizes it is a bull when he is kicked and sent flying. Farmer Pratchett puts Milton in charge of protecting his vegetables from the birds, but it does not quite work out for Milton when he is attacked by birds. Farmer Pratchett puts Jerry in charge of stacking hay bales, but Jerry gets distracted when a beautiful farm girl walks in. When she mentions how she once saw someone eating one of those red sauce devil pies, Jerry knows she is talking about pizza. Jerry starts making a move on her and decides to use his phone, which he hid so Detective Bronson would not confiscate it, to order pizza; however, what he does not realize is that he has called Benny, who hacked everyone's phone and is tracking Jerry. Meanwhile, Jack and Kim have been put in charge of collecting eggs laid by the chickens, but they have difficulties getting the last egg. Later, Benny and his goons arrive, much to everyone's surprise, and he explains that he hacked their phones and found them when Jerry used his phone to order pizza. A fight ensues, but the Wasabi Warriors end up being able to take down Benny and his goons and have them arrested. Guest stars: Cullen Douglas as Farmer Pratchett, Bruno Amato as Benny the Blade, Antonio D. Charity as Detective Bronson
51	7	"Jack Stands Alone"	Jean Sagal	Byron Kavanagh	June 26, 2013	310	0.72
Milton presents Kim as the new student council president, who makes Jack her vice president. When Erica and her cheerleaders perform a special act as a victory celebration, things go wrong when Frank causes her and her cheerleaders to come crashing down and Kim's face to crash into her celebration cake. Later, when Erica mentions that everyone voted for Kim because they thought she would stand up to people like Frank, Kim agrees to do something about the Frank situation. The next day, Jack tells Milton and Kim that somebody stole Seaford High's pet turtle Arlo, but they are able to find him in Frank's locker after Kim receives an anonymous text. Frank denies that he was involved, stating he did not even know he had a locker, but nobody believes him and Principal Funderburk takes him to detention. When Erica asks what happened and discovers that all Frank is getting for stealing Arlo is detention, she wants Kim to take drastic measures. Milton tells Erica that the school constitution states that a unanimous vote from the school council can expel a disruptive student. Later, Jack sees Frank crying at Falafel Phil's because he was framed at school and still insists he is not the culprit and asks Jack for help. Jack realizes that Frank always takes credit for his pranks and notices that he did not do so for the stolen turtle. Frank tells Jack that he was at the Black Dragon Dojo, and Jack realizes that he could not have done it and believes him. Later, when Kim is holding the vote, everyone votes to expel Frank, except for Jack. This upsets Kim, who later fires Jack as her vice president after she tells him that she will be holding another vote and he still refuses to vote to expel Frank. When Jack discovers that Frank lied to him about being at the Black Dragon Dojo, he starts to have his doubts; however, Frank reveals that the only reason he lied about that is because he has been taking ballet and did not want to be embarrassed. Later, when the council is about to vote again, Jack shows up and interrupts the voting and tells everyone to follow him because he can prove Frank's innocence. In the hallway, Jack explains that every afternoon, Janitor Bert waxes the stairs and floors, and yet no footprints were found anywhere at the scene. Jack further explains that the thief would have to reach Frank's locker without touching the stairs or the floor and gives a personal demonstration on how the thief did it. After the demonstration, Jack reveals that the thief is Erica, and Kim agrees as Erica is the only other person who can perform moves similar to Jack. Erica admits it was her and that she did it because Frank kept ruining her performances. Kim is apologetic to Jack and explains that she realized he was right after he put everything together, and Kim invites Jack back to be her vice principal, which he accepts. Guest stars: Wayne Dalglish as Frank, Eric Nenninger as Principal Funderburk, Amanda Leighton as Erica
52	8	"Two Dates and a Funeral"	Jason Earles	Jim O'Doherty	July 1, 2013	311	0.70
Albert wins a date with Kim through the It's a Date auction Milton is holding in order to raise money for marching band instruments; however, Jack later reveals to Kim that he had Albert bid on his behalf because the thought of her going out with another boy really bothered him. Jack asks Kim to go on a date with him, which she accepts, and when Kim asks Jack why he did not bid on her himself, he explains that he thought it would weird their friends out. Jack and Kim both agree to keep the date between them. Later, Jack tells Kim that he got them a reservation at Portaccini's and Kim tells Jack that she made him something, but cannot give it to him due to their promise. After Jack steps out, Jerry shows up, who is annoyed with his new girlfriend that he got from the auction for being too clingy. Kim tells Jerry she is sorry that things are not working out, but that the right person is closer than he thinks. As Kim walks off, Jerry notices a bracelet and tells her she forgot something, but upon further inspection, he discovers it to be a bracelet with the letters "J" and "K" on it. When Jerry asks Kim if the "J" and "K" stand for Jack and Kim and if they are together, Kim denies it; when Jerry then asks if he is the "J", Kim nervously tells him yes. As a result, Jerry asks Kim out on a date. Meanwhile, Jack is buying a corsage for Kim, but when Milton shows up and asks him what he has in the box, Jack tells him that it is his dead pet bird Bucky. Milton takes it seriously and starts arranging for a funeral. Meanwhile, while Jerry and Kim are on their "date", Kim gets the idea to start acting clingy so that Jerry will "break up" with her, which goes well at first, but it later ends up impressing Jerry. Meanwhile, Milton is holding the funeral for Bucky and asks Jack to say a few words. Jack hopes that is it for the service, but Milton tells him that there is more. Later, Jack and Kim try to have their date again, but Milton and Jerry show up, so Jack and Kim make up a lie that they are going to see a play. However, Milton says he wants to go with them, while Jerry wants Kim to go with him to look for some cheerleaders for him to reject. Jack and Kim have had enough of the secrets and tell Milton and Jerry that they are dating and explain everything. Milton and Jerry are happy for them and wish them good luck. Guest stars: Rio Mangini as Sam, Jimmy Bellinger as Albert
53	9	"Win, Lose or Ty"	Sean Lambert	Jim O'Doherty	July 8, 2013	307	0.94
After Rudy destroys the Black Dragon Dojo with his monster truck, he must share his dojo with Ty and his students. Both sides are not happy with this and eventually start getting into conflicts with each other. Later, Rudy and Ty start bonding with each other over a movie they both like and end up putting their differences aside. Later, the Wasabi Warriors and Black Dragons can no longer stand each other, and the Wasabi Warriors want the Black Dragons gone; however, both sides are disappointed when Rudy announces that he and Ty have agreed to join forces and that they will be combining their dojos permanently. Later, Jack and Kai come up with a plan on how to get Rudy and Ty to hate each other again so that the two dojos can go back to being two separate dojos. Jack and Kai release Ty's ants on Rudy's bonsai tree to eat it which in turn makes the ants sick; however, when Rudy and Ty return and discover this, they feel bad for each other's losses rather than get mad at each other. Later, during a feast, while Rudy and Ty are getting a surprise for everyone, a fight ensues between the Wasabi Warriors and Black Dragons. When Rudy and Ty return and discover the fight going on, they are upset and tell everyone that they will pay for all of the damage they have caused. Later, everyone has agreed that they should put their differences aside after seeing how Rudy and Ty put their differences aside, but when the students get them a ranking board as a gift, Rudy and Ty fight over whose name should be listed first and both sides go back to being enemies. Guest stars: Joel McCrary as Bobby Wasabi, Wayne Dalglish as Frank, Ian Reed Kesler as Sensei Ty, Rio Mangini as Sam, Troy Romzek as Kai
54	10	"Sensei & Sensibility"	Sean Lambert	Geoff Barbanell	July 15, 2013	312	0.59
Jack wants to participate in the big sensei tournament at the Seaford Civic Center, which is going to be televised; however, Rudy tells him that he cannot because he is not a sensei. Jack explains that he is a second-degree black belt, wins all of his tournaments, and is ready to take the next step, but Rudy tells him that there is so much more for him to teach him. Later, Jack meets Chuck Banner the Karate King, who tells that him that he can make him a sensei. Later, when Jack thinks Rudy is about to make him a sensei, it turns out that all Rudy wants from Jack is for him to be his cornerman, the person who empties the spit bucket and carries the shoes. Later, Rudy wants to work with Jack on their spit bucket technique; however, Jack tells him that he will not be his cornerman and will be competing at the tournament. When Rudy tells him again that he is not a sensei, Jack reveals that he is a sensei at Karate King and leaves. Later, Jack signs up for the sensei tournament, and runs into Rudy. Rudy tells him that he wants him to become a sensei, but when he is ready, though Jack feels like he is ready now. Jack tells Rudy that his problem is that he is jealous of Chuck. Later, during the tournament, both Jack and Rudy make it through the semi-finals with ease, but they must fight each other in the finals. After the first round of their fight, Jack asks Chuck for any martial arts advice since Rudy blocked every one of his moves and discovers that Chuck does not know karate and just uses it to make money. During the next round, Jack gets the upperhand at first, but Rudy focuses himself and manages to defeat Jack. Rudy later reveals that what he used was shin-du, and Jack apologizes to him and admits that he is not ready to be a sensei, but Rudy assures him that he will be. Guest stars: Loni Love as Marge, Travis Schuldt as Chuck Banner
55	11	"Gabby's Gold"	Sean Lambert	Itai Grunfeld	August 12, 2013	308	0.83
When Kim and her gymnastics team Seaford Killer Whales lose to the Swathmores at a gymnastics tournament, their coach quits and they must try to find a new one. When a new coach cannot be found, Kim steps up and takes the role; however, this causes members to leave. Later, Milton reveals that he ran into Gabby Douglas at the gymnastics tour, whom he told about Kim's situation, and she agreed to coach Kim and her team members for the Swathmore Meet. Later, while preparing for the tournament, Kim starts freaking out because there is a member for every event, except the rings; however, her and Gabby discover that Jerry has a talent for the rings after he uses them to hide from Lenore, who was chasing him for comforting another girl, and want to make him a part of the team. Later, Jerry's performance manages to get a score of nine from all three judges; however, when Tiffany from Swathmore also gets a score of nine across the board, Claire tells Kim that she will need a perfect routine to win. Kim starts freaking out about having to be perfect, but Gabby tells her to calm down and tells her it is not the end of the world if they do not win. Gabby also tells Kim that her grandfather taught her that there had to be a balance between hard work and having fun, and Kim realizes that Gabby is right and tells her that she is just going to out there and have fun. During her performance, Kim does not manage to stick the landing well and falls down on the mat, but she is happy with herself for having fun. Meanwhile, Jack and Rudy teach prisoners about various meditative techniques; however, when the prisoners learn from Rudy that Gabby Douglas is at the gymnastics tournament at the Seaford Civic Center, one of the prisoners hides in a laundry container that Jack and Rudy are taking back to the dojo and has plans on stealing the victory medals at the tournament with some of his friends. Later, Carl and his friends, who are dressed up as security guards, try to steal the medals, but Jack notices them and the Wasabi Warriors manage to stop them. Guest stars: Gabby Douglas as herself, Brooke Dillman as Joan, Katherine McNamara as Claire, Kaylee Bryant as Tori
56	12	"The New Girl"	Bill Shea	Adrienne Sterman	September 23, 2013	314	0.57
While at Karate Con, Jack, Kim, and Rudy notice that Sloane Jennings is there, whose manager Vance is trying to find a new dojo for her. Later, Rudy changes everything about the dojo in effort to try to impress Sloane and Vance when they arrive. Sloane and Vance later arrive, and Kim is excited to meet Sloane and tells her that she is glad that she is joining the dojo; however, Sloane tells her it is not her decision and that Vance makes all of her decisions, and she will find out the next day at the Karate Con press conference. Later, at the press conference, Vance reveals that he has decided that Sloane will compete for nationals as a member of the Bobby Wasabi Dojo, which makes Jack, Kim, and Rudy happy. While Sloane is at the dojo, Rudy makes Jack his assistant sensei, which Jack is proud to be. Later, Sloane confides in Kim while they are at Karaoke Cafe that she does not really have a life as she has been turned into a business, and she would give anything just to be a normal girl again. Kim tells her to just be a normal girl, but Sloane says she cannot because her manager runs her career, who discovered her when her parents could not even afford karate classes; thanks to him, her family has a better life. Kim asks Sloane when the last time she had fun was and takes her onstage to perform karaoke. Later, Vance confronts Sloane for being late and states that Kim is a bad influence and must go or he and Sloane will leave, causing Rudy to become conflicted. Kim tells Sloane to tell Vance what she told her, but instead she apologizes for being late. Later, while getting ready for nationals, Jack and Rudy notice that Sloane does not seem to be herself and ask her what is wrong. Sloane feels terrible for getting Kim kicked out of the dojo because she said what Sloane did not have the guts to say. Rudy tells Sloane that she does not have to do this if she is not happy, but she says she has to because she does not want to let people down. Rudy admits that he and Jack are the ones who let her down, as Rudy was so caught up in wanting to be her sensei that he forgot to be a sensei and apologizes. Jack asks Sloane where she would rather be currently, and Jack, Rudy, and Sloane later show up at Karaoke Cafe. Kim is there and is happy to see Sloane, who thanks for giving her the courage to tell Jack and Rudy how she felt. Vance and his friend Trent show up as Kim and Sloane are performing karaoke and Vance and Trent try to get them, but Jack and Rudy will not let them. A fight ensues, and just as the song ends, Jack and Rudy, as well as Kim and Sloane, defeat Trent and Vance. Meanwhile, Milton and Joan try to get Jerry over his bad lying habit, but it ends up with Jerry going too far the other way and always telling the truth. Later, Milton shows Jerry that Falafel Phil's has been closed down by a health inspector, girls no longer trust any boys and chase them, and Joan has turned to a life of crime after her boss fired her. After focusing on Joan, Jerry turns back and notices that Milton is gone and also notices a tombstone on the ground that says Milton died from a broken heart when Julie never came back. Milton and Joan show up and tell Jerry that they were just trying to teach him a lesson and show him what would happen if he told nothing but the truth. Jerry is confused as Milton and Joan wanted him to tell the truth, but Milton explains that the trick is figuring out when to tell the truth and when to hold back. Guest stars: Brooke Dillman as Joan, Matt Mullins as Trent Darby, Kelli Berglund as Sloane, Cooper Barnes as Vance
57	13	"Fawlty Temple"	Sean Lambert	J.J. Wall	September 30, 2013	318	0.38
The Wasabi Warriors are taking care of the Shaolin Temple while the Shaolin Warriors are out. When Jerry shows Milton and Rudy that he has strong abs when he opens a glass bottle for Milton, Rudy gets the idea to make a belt that is worn and simulates little karate chops, making the person tighten up and giving them a beautiful toned stomach. Rudy wants to call it Ninja Abs, and Milton and Jerry are impressed with the idea. Later, Rudy asks Lou for a $5,000 loan in order to mass-produce the belts, and then tells him that they will also be able to do a live infomercial to cash in on the fitness craze with the loan. Lou agrees to give him the loan on the condition that if he cannot pay it back, Lou gets to keep his dojo, to which Rudy agrees. Later, Rudy's infomercial does not go quite as planned when the Ninja Abs belt on Jerry malfunctions and explodes. Later, Lou later demands his money back or he gets to keep the dojo; when Lou's wife and daughter Gilda and Margot barge in and are upset with him for ruining their vacation, Rudy tells them that Lou had a very good reason for not booking the trip, and that is because he wanted to surprise them with a luxury vacation at the Shaolin Temple. Later, at the Shaolin Temple, Lou tells Rudy that if he can keep Gilda and Margot happy for a couple of days, his loan will be forgiven. However, things go wrong when Lou, Gilda, and Margot become stuck in a mud bath that Jerry accidentally put grout in. Later, when Lou, Gilda, and Margot are trying to have dinner, things go wrong again when salad is spilled all over the place. When Rudy is trying open a bottle of sparkling cider, the lid flies off and hits Milton in the eye, causing him to run into plumbers he and the Wasabi Warriors met earlier and knock over their wheelbarrow full of treasure. Milton, Jerry, and Rudy quickly realize they are thieves, but end up being captured and tied up, along with Lou, Gilda, and Margot. Lou later manages to break out of the ropes thanks to his slim wrists and free Milton, Jerry, and Rudy; when the thieves realize that everyone has broken free, a fight ensues. The thieves are eventually defeated, and even though things did not go exactly as planned, Lou still forgives Rudy's loan. Guest stars: Eddie Pepitone as Lou, Mara Marini as Gilda, Gigi Grombacher as Margot, D.C. Douglas as Chuck Crawford, Joseph Ferrante as Mario
58	14	"Seaford, We Have a Problem"	Sean Lambert	Itai Grunfeld	October 7, 2013	315	0.69
Milton is graduating from the Junior Astronaut Program and is chosen to be valedictorian; however, during his speech, General Jones interrupts him and announces that the president has informed him that the Russians are planning on sending a 17-year-old boy into space, which would make the boy the youngest astronaut ever. This upsets General Jones, who states that the Seaford Aeronautics Space Administration has held onto that record for years and it is a record they intend on keeping and tells Milton that he will be going up into space. Later, when Jerry learns that Milton's astronaut title is helping him attract girls, he asks Milton if he can get him a job at SASA, and Milton tells him that he will talk to General Jones. Later, General Jones bestows the job of watching his wife's cat Wiggy to Jerry. Gunnar Nelson invites Milton to a party, which Jerry also wants to attend, but when he leaves, Gunnar tells Milton that Jerry does not really belong at the party. Milton tells Gunnar that Jerry is his best friend; however, Gunnar just tells him that he should be the one to tell Jerry that he cannot come. When Jerry returns, Milton tells him he cannot come to the party, which saddens Jerry; however, Jerry later gets into trouble when he is looking for Wiggy and accidentally launches the space shuttle into space. When Jerry later pushes another button while General Jones is trying to help him, he ends up damaging the shuttle, and Milton later discovers that the only way for Jerry to get back to Earth is for him to jump from the shuttle. Later, when it comes time to jump, Milton tells Jerry that it is just a simple freefall of 11 miles from space back to Earth. Jerry tells Milton that he is afraid, but Milton reassures him that he will be fine and tells him that once he reaches 5,000 feet, he needs to pull his parachute's ripcord. Milton will also be in radio contact with Jerry the entire time, and Jerry's jump is also being broadcast on television, which Jack, Kim, and Rudy are watching. Milton tells Jerry that how he leaves the ship will determine his trajectory for the entire descent and tells him to just lean forward and let gravity do the work. However, Jerry's exit does not go quite as planned and radio contact is temporarily lost, but he still manages to get control and pull his ripcord. Jerry chooses the school's football field for his landing place, but he ends up crashing through the roof of Falafel Phil's. Jack, Kim, and Rudy are glad that Jerry is okay, and so are Milton and General Jones when they show up. As a bonus, Jerry tells General Jones that he also took Wiggy with him on the trip back to Earth, and General Jones is thankful to Jerry. Guest stars: Murray Gershenz as Murray, Brad Potts as General Jones, Michael Charles Roman as Gunnar Nelson, Brenda Ballard as Bernice, Brett Wagner as Zeke
59	15	"Temple of Doom"	Bill Shea	Frank O. Wolff	October 14, 2013	317	0.77
Kim is in charge of the school Halloween party this year, which the others are helping her prepare for, and she wants to find a place better than the school gym to host it. Wan Chi shows up at the dojo and asks if the Wasabi Warriors can watch the Shaolin Temple while he and the other Shaolin Warriors are away for two weeks, and Milton offers to be the one in charge. Later, at the temple, when Milton tells Wan Chi that he is not much of a party person, Wan Chi tells Milton that he reminds him of the ancient warrior Yoshimi, who did not like to have fun, either. Legend has it that his spirit is trapped in the temple walls, waiting for a kiss from Mariko to set him free. Later, Milton notices that Jack, Jerry, and Kim are setting up decorations in the temple's courtyard, and when he asks what they are doing, Kim tells him that the temple is the perfect place to have the Halloween party. However, Milton will not allow it and confronts Kim, but she ends up throwing the party anyway. Later, Kim confronts Milton for ruining her party, but Milton threatens to call Wan Chi about the party, though he does not have his phone and asks Jack to borrow his, but Jack lies and says he did not bring it, so Milton goes to look for one in a room. However, things go wrong when Yoshimi's spirit comes out of a picture of him in the wall and possesses Milton. When Yoshimi goes back out and starts causing trouble, Jack, Jerry, and Kim later realize that Milton is not himself. Kim finds a book that explains what is going on with Milton and that he has been possessed. Jack notices that the sketch of Mariko looks like Kim, so he, Jerry, and Kim come up with a plan to dress Kim up like Mariko. Jack and Jerry try to hold off Yoshimi while Kim is getting ready, which does not go too well. Kim walks out as Mariko and Yoshimi instantly recognizes her. Mariko tells Yoshimi that he has found her and he can now move on from this world; however, he tells her that he cannot until she fulfills her promise of a kiss. Kim is hesitant at first, but silently gets Jack's approval since it is to save Milton and kisses Yoshimi. Yoshimi leaves Milton's body, and Milton returns to normal, but does not remember anything that happened while he was possessed. Jack and Kim want to stop the party and clean the temple up, but Milton tells them that another couple of hours will not hurt anybody after seeing that everybody is having fun. Guest stars: Joel McCrary as Bobby Wasabi, Rio Mangini as Sam, Jimmy Bellinger as Albert, Derek Mio as Wan Chi
60	16	"Mama Mima"	Jason Earles	Joel McCrary	November 4, 2013	316	0.58
Phil is upset with the Wasabi Warriors after they forget his birthday; in order to make it up to him, Jerry, Kim, and Rudy plan to throw him the best birthday party ever. All of his friends will come, including Joan, who will perform a special Hachmachi dance. Rudy reveals that he is flying Phil's mother Mama Mima over, who has not seen Phil since he moved to Seaford. Later, at the surprise party, Phil faints when he sees his mother; he later reveals that he has been living a lie and that his mother thinks he is someone who he is not. When Mama Mima returns, she thinks that Jerry and Kim are her grandchildren, but when Phil starts to tell her the truth, Jerry and Kim say they are her grandchildren. Mama Mima also believes Joan is Phil's wife, and everyone pretends to be Phil's biological family. However, things start going wrong when Mama Mima says Kim is ugly and gives her a Hachmachi makeover to make her less ugly. After Mama Mima says she has decided to stay at Seaford, Jerry and Kim insist that Phil tell her truth. When Phil tells his mother the truth, she calls him a disgrace and wants him to move back to Hachmachistan because he does not have family in Seaford; however, Jerry, Kim, and Rudy tell Mama Mima that Phil does have a family in Seaford, and they love him very much. When Mama Mima realizes how happy Phil is in Seaford, she decides to let him stay. Meanwhile, Milton asks Jack to be his weatherman on Seaford High News. Jack agrees, but he and Milton end up getting into a couple of physical fights when they disagree on how Jack should be presenting the news. However, when Jack and Milton later learn that Albert has been taking advantage of their fights for ratings, they get revenge on him. Guest stars: Brooke Dillman as Joan, Dan Ahdoot as Falafel Phil, Jimmy Bellinger as Albert, Natalija Nogulich as Mama Mima
61	17	"Home Alone in School"	Bill Shea	Frank O. Wolff	November 11, 2013	306	1.05
After Jack and Kim unknowingly help Jerry pull a prank on Principal Funderburk in his school bathroom from the boiler room, they as well as Jerry are given Saturday detention. Jack and Kim try to explain they did not know, but Funderburks tells them that is the price to pay for being friends with Jerry. In addition to detention, Jack, Jerry, and Kim will not be getting any of the new myPads. On detention day, Jerry is late arriving for detention, and Jack and Jerry are already upset enough as it is. Jack tells Jerry that maybe Funderburk is right and that being his friend is just not worth it. Later, when Jerry can hear that Funderburk is in trouble from the boiler room below Funderburk's bathroom, he goes down to the boiler room, where he quietly enters and sees Jack, Kim, and Funderburk chained to pipes and the janitor Brock trying to steal the myPads. The myPads are worth a quarter of a million dollars and are Brock's retirement plan. After Jerry announces on the intercom that he is also in the building and in Funderburk's bathroom and Brock goes to find him, Jerry shows up in the boiler room to try to rescue Jack, Kim, and Funderburk. Jack reveals that he and Kim were taken down easily because Brock is the Heinous Hyena, the toughest cage fighter that ever lived. Later, Jack, Kim, and Funderburk walk Jerry through on how to set up the myPads to connect them to the school cameras so that they can see what Brock is doing. Jerry messes with Brock in an effort to stop him, but he eventually runs out of ammo to use against him and Brock later returns to the boiler room. Jerry manages to snatch the keys away from Brock and throws them to Jack, who frees Kim and himself. Jack, Jerry, and Kim have no luck in fighting Brock at first, but they eventually figure out a way to outsmart him and defeat him and chain him to the pipes. Guest stars: Eric Nenninger as Principal Funderburk, Noshir Dalal as Brock
62	18	"School of Jack"	Sean Lambert	Jamie Carpenter & Josh Mosberg	November 18, 2013	319	0.63
The school has cut funding for the classical music club, and Milton and the other club members try to raise money to save the club. Jack is excited and tells Jerry and Kim it is because the Gutter Rats are looking for a new member for their band, who are the favorites to win the following week's Battle of the Bands. Later, Jack auditions to be the Gutter Rats' lead guitarist and is excited when he ends up getting the spot. However, Jack later realizes that the Gutter Rats is full of jerks when the lead singer Flint wants to dirt bomb Milton and Sidney outside of Falafel Phil's. After Jack stands up for Milton, he is kicked out of the Gutter Rats. Later, Jack notices that Milton, Sidney, and the others are packing up after they could not save the classical music club, but Jack tells Milton that he is not going to give up. Jack also tells Milton about the $1,000 prize for winning Battle of the Bands and decides to help his club and turn everyone into rock stars. However, it goes wrong when Jack tries too hard and tries to turn Milton and the others into something they are not. Jack later realizes that he should just let them be who they are and is apologetic to Milton and the others and tells them that he believes they can win. Later, during Battle of the Bands, Jack, Kim, and the others perform classical music, but they amp it up when they add a touch of rock to it. Milton's club ends up winning Battle of the Bands and saving their club. Guest stars: Harrison Boxley as Sidney, Eric Tiede as Izzy, Ronnie Connell as Flint, Jimmy Bellinger as Albert
63	19	"Queen of Karts"	Sean Lambert	Byron Kavanagh	November 25, 2013	320	0.64
The Junior National 500 go kart race is being held at the Seaford racetrack this year; Jack tells Kim that she has to take part in it, and all they need is a sponsor. Jack, Milton, and Kim ask Bobby Wasabi to sponsor them, and he says yes. Later, when Kim tries to sign up at the racetrack, Tad and his father Luc tell her that she cannot compete in the boys' division because she is a girl, despite her time being better than almost everyone in the boys' division. Jack defends Kim and tells Tad and Luc that Kim has every right to race with the boys, but Tad and Luc still refuse. Later, Milton tells Jack that he would be the perfect replacement for Kim since he has the high score on Spin Out, a racing game at Falafel Phil's, and has amazing reflexes, and Jack agrees to be the new driver. However, during the race, it turns out that Jack is not that great at actually driving a go kart. After the race, a mysterious racer comes up to Jack and hugs him, revealing himself to be Kim disguised as a boy. Kim later reveals that she is just posing as a boy to get into the Junior National 500 and make a point. Jack agrees and states that people should judge another based on ability, not whether they are a boy or a girl. Kim agrees to rejoin Jack, Milton, and Bobby Wasabi disguised as a boy named Cam. Later, at the racetrack, Tad has one of his members sabotage Kim's go kart. Later, during the race, Kim discovers that she cannot slow down for a sharp turn; when she gets back to the pit stop, Jack figures that the brake line must be damaged, but Milton reveals it is more than that and that the brakes have been destroyed; without brakes, it means that the race is over. Later, Kim refuses to quit, but Milton tells her that without brakes, she will just spin out. This reminds Jack of the Spin Out game he plays at Falafel Phil's, and he explains that sometimes brakes are lost there and that the only way to make a turn is by doing something called the Daytona Drift. The Daytona Drift is a racing move, where the driver slams on the gas and yanks the steering wheel away from the turn, and Kim agrees to give it a try. Kim manages to win the race, and when Luc is about to give her the trophy, she reveals who really drove the go kart. Tad is upset and says that it is illegal, but Kim states that so is removing someone's brake line. Luc is upset at Tad for cheating and states that from now on, if a person qualifies, they race, regardless of whether they are a boy or a girl. Guest stars: Joel McCrary as Bobby Wasabi, Zayne Emory as Tad Monaco, Graham Clarke as Luc Monaco, Robert Costanzo as Harvey
64	20	"How Bobby Got His Groove Back"	Jim O'Doherty	Rick Williams & Jenna McGrath	January 13, 2014	321	0.74
After Bobby Wasabi's new movie Super Samurai does not turn out well, Bobby becomes a joke and students start leaving the Bobby Wasabi Dojo, and things get worse when Bobby decides to move in and live at the dojo. Bobby reveals that his mansion is gone because he put everything he had into the movie, and what was supposed to be his big comeback turned into his big "go away". Later, Jack has good news and reads a newspaper article to Rudy and Bobby that explains that troubled action star Chet Stone got fired after another meltdown on the set of The Undestroyables 4 and director John Ahearn said recasting will begin immediately. Rudy tells Bobby that if he can get cast in that movie, he will be a star again and the dojo can be saved. Jack and Rudy offer to help him, but they must first get him back into shape. Later, Bobby auditions, but John rejects him on the grounds that Bobby is a has-been. However, when Chet Stone returns and threatens that if he is not in the movie, there will be no movie, the actors run away, while Jack, Rudy, and Bobby stay and fight Chet and his friends, quickly defeating them. John is impressed and offers Bobby to be the lead in the movie, but Bobby passes on the offer and says that thanks to his friends Jack and Rudy, he now knows who Bobby Wasabi is. Meanwhile, Milton manages to find a girlfriend, whose name is Heidi, but when Jerry and Kim meet her, they quickly discover that she is obsessive over Milton. Jerry and Kim try to warn Milton, but he ignores their warning and thinks that they just do not think that Heidi is right for him. Later, when Heidi takes Milton to her family's cabin far away in the woods, he begins to realize that Jerry and Kim were right and calls them for help. Jerry and Kim later show up to help Milton, where Kim explains that Heidi is actually the Valedictorian Vixen. Jerry further explains that Heidi has been kicked out of every school she has been in because she has been obsessed with dating the smartest boy. Jerry tells Heidi that Milton is not the smartest boy in the school, and Kim opens the door to reveal that Albert is the smartest boy. Later, Albert proves to be too much for even Heidi, but Milton, Jerry, and Kim are just glad to be rid of her. Guest stars: Joel McCrary as Bobby Wasabi, Jimmy Bellinger as Albert, Ben Begley as John Ahearn, Brooke Sorenson as Heidi
65	21	"Return of Spyfall"	Sean Lambert	Jim O'Doherty	January 20, 2014	313	0.85
Jack and Milton have won an essay contest and get to go to Washington D.C. with Principal Funderburk. Later, when Jack, Milton, and Funderburk are at Presidential Patties in Washington D.C., Funderburk reveals that he is not actually a principal, but rather an undercover agent working for the government. He also reveals that the reason Jack and Milton are in Washington D.C. is because he is putting together a team of teenage spies and he needs Jack and Milton for a mission. Funderburk later further explains that he brought Jack and Milton to Washington D.C. because he needs their help in fighting the spread of RASH, which stands for Radical Agents Sabotaging Humanity. Funderburk reveals that Jack protecting the prince in "Spyfall" was a test, a test that Jack passed with flying colors. Funderburk also reveals that one of his agents played the part of the prince, who is revealed to be Agent Shane Peters. Jack and Milton then meet the last member of their team: Grey. Funderburk explains that a year ago, his ex-partner turned evil and assumed the alias of Dr. Cross, who became the head of RASH and stole the files of every spy in the program. Funderburk asks Jack and Milton if they are in, and Milton, on behalf of himself and Jack, agrees to help him. Later, the team gets a transmission from Dr. Cross, who tells them that he has plans to use liquitonium for evil purposes. Later, Funderburk comes up with a plan on how everyone will intercept an enemy agent landing at the airport and get the liquitonium he is carrying, but during the mission, things do not go exactly as planned and the agent gets away. Later, Jack, Milton, Shane, and Grey are able to get a new lead and take Funderburk's jet copter to catch a subway train heading to Freedom Island to finish what they started. Later, Jack, Milton, Shane, and Grey are able to locate the enemy agents on the subway, who turn out to be cyborgs. A fight ensues, and things do not go well at first, especially when one of the agents shorts the train's brakes. Milton tries to stop the train, while the others continue fighting with the enemy agents. Jack eventually manages to get the liquitonium from an enemy agent who escaped to the top of the train, while Shane and Grey take care of the last enemy agent inside of the train and give Milton some more breathing room to get the train's brakes to work again. Despite disobeying orders, Funderburk is later impressed by the team. Guest stars: Eric Nenninger as Funderburk, Scott Dunn as Shane, Lulu Antariksa as Grey Absent: Jason Earles as Rudy
66	22	"Wasabi Forever"	Sean Lambert	Jim O'Doherty	January 27, 2014	322	0.67
Everyone is getting ready to go their separate ways. Kim has been accepted into Otai Academy, while the Seaford Animal Park is sending Jerry to Kenya for a research project. Jack and Milton will be moving to Washington D.C. to work as spies, though they cannot tell their friends about it as it will only put them in danger, so all they can say is that they got scholarships to the Biltmore Academy. Later, Rudy tells everyone that they will always be connected by the Wasabi Code and shares a story about the first Wasabi Warriors and how the Wasabi Code came to be. At the climax of the story, the ancient Wasabi Warriors Jack-Hai, Mil-Tong, Jerry-Cong, Kim-Yee and their sensei Rudy-Kai take on the Dark Master, who shows up to destroy the last practitioners of The Wasabi Way. Jack-Hai will not let that happen; however, the Dark Master proves to be too powerful as he is using power from the Dragon's Eye. Jack-Hai realizes that there is nothing stronger than family and he comes up with a plan that involves everyone working together as a family. The ancient Wasabi Warriors eventually manage to defeat the Dark Master and come up with the Wasabi Code, and the story ends with Jack-Hai and Kim-Yee discovering a love that will last for eternity. It is time to leave and Rudy and the others give each other a big group hug and say goodbye. Outside of the dojo, Jerry's ride has arrived, and he tells Jack, Milton, and Kim that he loves them and they all share another hug among themselves and say goodbye. Before Jack and Milton depart for their journey, Jack asks Milton to give him and Kim a minute. Later, Jack and Milton head to Washington D.C. to get their spy on. Guest stars: Brooke Dillman as Joan, Brooke Dillman as Feudal Joan, Dan Ahdoot as Falafel Phil, Joel McCrary as Bobby Wasabi, Wayne Dalglish as Frank, Ian Reed Kesler as Sensei Ty, Eric Nenninger as Funderburk

=== Season 4 (2014–2015) ===
No. overall	No. in season	Title	Directed by	Written by	Original release date	Prod. code	U.S. viewers (millions)
67	1	"The Boys Are Back in Town"	Sean Lambert	Jim O'Doherty	February 17, 2014	401	0.82
Jack, Milton, Funderburk, and Shane have completed their final mission in Washington D.C., which means that Jack and Milton can return to Seaford, but before they separate, Funderburk gives Jack and Milton magnet watches and Shane a laser pen as gifts. When Jack and Milton return to Seaford, they discover that Rudy has opened up a new dojo called Wasabi Warrior Academy, while Phil has opened up a new business called Falafel Phil's Bowl and Burger. Later, Milton receives a text from Funderburk that says there is an emergency and he needs Jack and Milton to contact him. When Jack and Milton contact Funderburk, he explains that there was one RASH agent they did not know about, who is recruiting new people. When Jack and Milton arrive at the spy base in Washington D.C., they discover that Shane has been working as a double agent. Shane has had enough with everyone thinking that Jack and Milton are the world's greatest spies, and they, along with Funderburk, will not be leaving alive. Shane has Jack, Milton, and Funderburk locked up, and as soon as he is done loading up some things from the base, he will push the self-destruct button to destroy them. Milton comes up with a plan to use his magnet watch to pull the metal garbage can over to the cage to get the laser pen Shane threw away so that he can use it to break the cage lock. After Shane pushes the self-destruct button, Jack, Milton, and Funderburk break free, but Shane and his men show up. Jack, Milton, and Funderburk are able to defeat them and Milton and Funderburk escape, but Jack notices that Shane has been trapped under a piece of rubble and decides to rescue him. Later, back at Seaford, Funderburk tells Jack and Milton that thanks to them, Shane and his men have been captured. Guest stars: Brooke Dillman as Joan, Dan Ahdoot as Falafel Phil, Eric Nenninger as Funderburk, Scott Dunn as Shane
68	2	"Gold Diggers"	Sean Lambert	Geoff Barbanell	February 24, 2014	403	0.49
After Edna dies, Jack, Milton, and Rudy discover that they were put in her will, but instead of receiving money, they receive ten acres of land. Later, a man by the name of Doyle Bronson shows up, who figures that Jack, Milton, and Rudy have no need for the land and offers $1,000 for it; however, Rudy rejects his offer. Milton thinks that there is something weird going on and wonders why the man would offer $1,000 for that worthless piece of land, so Rudy figures that it must not be so worthless after all. Later, Jack, Milton, and Rudy are back on the land, and Rudy still cannot figure out what is so special about it; however, when Rudy jumps up and down in frustration, he falls through a hole. Jack and Milton later come down through the hole and discover a series of tunnels; when Jack asks Rudy if there is anything on the deed about the tunnels, Milton discovers that the deed is more than just a deed, as it is also a secret map of a gold mine within the tunnels. Jack, Milton, and Rudy later manage to find gold, but they start going crazy with gold fever and start turning on each other; however, they must work together when Doyle and his men show up to try to steal the gold. Jack, Milton, and Rudy are able to defeat Doyle and his men, but as Doyle and his men are retreating, Doyle cuts down the bridge, which is the only escape route, and places a stick of dynamite by it. Later, after Milton fails to get the dynamite with a rope in order to defuse it, Jack gets the idea to use the pickaxes to swing across. He places pickaxes in the wall as he swings across for Milton and Rudy to swing across afterward. However, while Rudy is swinging across, the first pickaxe falls out of the wall, and Milton cannot reach the second pickaxe. Rudy manages to swing back and grab Milton by his hand, and all three are able to safely escape. Guest stars: Dan Ahdoot as Phil, Greg Bryan as Doyle
69	3	"From Zeroes to Heroes"	Sean Lambert	Itai Grunfeld	March 3, 2014	404	0.51
Milton, Jerry, and Joan form the Tiger Trio and make a video to promote themselves. They later get an invitation to perform at the Yucca Valley Cactus Festival from Mayor Duggan. Milton, Jerry, and Joan all want to go, though Joan wonders what will happen once they get there and are not as good as they look in their video, but Milton just says that they will bring a little Hollywood movie magic. Later, Milton, Jerry, and Joan meet a nice girl named Nikki at Yucca Valley, and during the Tiger Trio performance, Jerry accidentally hits a man with a board he kicks. The man is agitated and says he will be back with his gang and that the entire town will be sorry. Nikki explains that the man is the leader of the Diablos, a biker gang that has ruined every Cactus Festival the town has ever had. Nikki says that this year will be different because the town has the Tiger Trio; however, she later discovers Milton, Jerry, and Joan trying to leave because they are not the real deal and becomes upset. Later, as Milton, Jerry, and Joan are continuing to get ready to leave, they are approached by a little boy named Billy, who says that the whole town is saying they are leaving, but he knows that cannot be true because the Tiger Trio are his heroes. Milton, Jerry, and Joan start feeling guilty and agree to stay and fight the Diablos, and Milton tells Billy to have everyone meet them in the town square. Milton's plan is for the Tiger Trio and the entire town to make the Diablos believe they are all mean and tough. When the Diablos show up, they think that the town has been deserted, but to their surprise, everyone suddenly appears. When Milton has Billy break a brick, the leader of the Diablos is scared and he and the rest of his gang retreat. Yucca Valley now recognizes the Tiger Trio as heroes. Guest stars: Brooke Dillman as Joan, Eric Tiede as Izzy, Eddie Pepitone as Lou, Madalyn Horcher as Nikki
70	4	"The 'Stang"	Joel McCrary	Peter Dirksen & Jonathan Howard	March 10, 2014	406	0.66
When Milton's ex-girlfriend Julie is out in the courtyard, Milton tries to impress her and ask her out on a date; however, he soon discovers that she has a boyfriend named Dan, who is taking Julie to a senior party on Friday night in his car. Later, Jerry gets the idea for Milton to borrow his father's Mustang and take it to the party. Milton is hesitant at first, but agrees after Jerry reminds him that he wants Julie to see him as a man rather than a boy. Later, Milton has borrowed his father's car; however, things go wrong when Milton and Jerry later discover that the car has been stolen. Julie and Dan show up, and Milton asks them for a ride; however, after Dan refuses to give him and Jerry a ride, Milton becomes agitated and tells Dan that he will give them a ride. The group is able to track down the Mustang at a garage shop thanks to a GPS locator app on Jerry's cell phone, where they find men trying to take the car apart for parts. Milton's plan to get the car back is to dress up like the man who was sent to pick up the car by the men's boss, but when that fails, a fight ensues. Milton and Jerry are able to defeat the men, and Julie is impressed by Milton's bravery and asks if they can go to the party together, but Milton declines her invitation and tells her that he only dates women now. Meanwhile, Jack and Rudy convince Titus and his men to train at the Wasabi Warrior Academy; however, things go wrong when Titus and his men start taking over the dojo. Later, when Titus threatens Rudy, Jack throws him in an armlock and demands that he start showing respect to other people. When Titus realizes that the dojo is also Jack and Rudy's home, he agrees to start following the rules. Guest stars: Hannah Leigh as Julie, Todd Howard as Titus
71	5	"Nerd with a Cape"	Jason Earles	Joel McCrary	March 31, 2014	405	0.47
Hero Con is holding a contest on Saturday for the best new superhero; however, Milton later discovers that he has to go to his aunt's birthday party on the same day. Jerry tells Milton that Hero Con is also on Friday, though he must skip school. Jerry uses an app on his phone that makes him sound like a worried mother to call the principal and tell him that Milton cannot make it to school tomorrow as he has come down with the mumps. Later, when Milton saves a lady from a falling sign, he tells her that he is The Laser Blade as he cannot reveal who he is due to skipping school. However, problems arise when the paper is offering $500 for The Laser Blade to reveal himself, as Milton cannot reveal himself since it would mean detention. Later, Jerry steals the glory and dresses himself up as The Laser Blade and then reveals himself as the face behind the mask, which upsets Milton. However, things later go wrong during a photo shoot when Jerry ends up dangling several feet above ground from the Seaford water tower. After Milton manages to save him, Jerry explains that wearing a costume does not make a person a hero and that he just found the costume in the garbage, which gives Milton the courage to reveal himself as the true hero. Later, Jerry gives Milton a present from Don Mills and apologizes for stealing the credit. Meanwhile, Jack meets his new lab partner Taylor, but he becomes judgmental when he learns that Taylor is from Swathmore. Later, Taylor gets a job working at the dojo's juice bar, to which Jack does not take well. When Jack wipes his dirty hands on Taylor's cashmere scarf, Taylor becomes upset and quits to get a job somewhere else after she reveals that her father's company went out of business and she has to help the family. Later, Jack apologizes and gives Taylor a new cashmere scarf, and she agrees to come back. Guest stars: Veronica Dunne as Taylor, Valorie Hubbard as Mama Sparkle, Amy Paffrath as Connie
72	6	"RV There Yet?"	Sean Lambert	Byron Kavanagh	April 7, 2014	402	0.54
Jack and Milton have been at each other's throats for weeks and Rudy has had enough, so he takes them on a road trip in an RV to bring them closer together. However, it goes wrong when the RV rolls down an incline and hangs dangerously over a cliff with Rudy inside. Milton gets the idea to cut his nature napper, a blowup mattress that Jack popped earlier, into strips and make a rope out of it since it is made from really strong rubber. Later, Milton uses the rope to lower Jack onto the RV from a tree branch, but Jack has trouble with the rescue, as the RV is unstable. Jack tells Rudy that he has to jump and grab his hand, but when Rudy jumps, the tree branch breaks, sending Jack and Rudy plummeting down. Milton is upset, as he thinks he has lost his friends, but Jack and Rudy show up behind him. Milton thinks he is hearing their voices as angels in heaven, but when he turns around, he is glad to see that they are all right and gives Jack a big hug. Rudy reveals that they were able to survive when the rope slammed them into the side of the canyon, allowing them to use roots to climb their way out. Jack is appreciative toward Milton and Milton tells him that when he thought he lost him, it felt like he had a hole in his heart about as big as the canyon. Milton tells Jack that he is like a brother to him, and Jack adds that just because brothers fight, it does not mean that they do not care about each other. Meanwhile, Jerry and Joan find Babe Ruth's lucky jockstrap and are offered $50,000 for it; however, after Jerry and Joan use it for their own personal gains, they get into a fight over it when they each need it on the same day and end up ripping it. Guest star: Brooke Dillman as Joan
73	7	"Invasion of the Ghost Pirates"	Bill Shea	Marty Donovan & Adrienne Sterman	April 14, 2014	410	0.98
An old fisherman warns Jack and Rudy that on the night of the lunar eclipse, Longshanks will return and take revenge on anyone on the wharf, but Jack does not buy into it. However, when Longshanks shows up, Jack's skepticism is put to the test, especially after Ty is grabbed and dragged by something when a mysterious mist appears. Later, a fight ensues between Jack and Rudy and Longshanks and his ghost men, but Jack and Rudy discover that they can only hit some of them. Jack finds Rudy's night vision goggles that Ty dropped earlier and discovers that the ghosts are being projected and some of them are not real. Jack goes up to the radio studio and discovers that Ty and the old fisherman were behind the whole thing. Meanwhile, Jerry returns from Arizona after getting Mama G's famous tamales, and after realizing how great they taste, Milton wants to go to Arizona himself for more. Milton and Jerry arrive in Arizona to get more tamales, but when Milton insults Mama G by saying her tamales could use a smidge of hot sauce, she bans Milton and Jerry from getting any more tamales. Jerry is upset and reveals that the tamales are made from a secret recipe; however, Milton is able to use science to find out everything that is in a tamale by examining Jerry's unfinished tamale. When the first batch is ready and Milton has Jerry try a tamale, Jerry tells Milton has his tamales are even better than Mama G's. Milton then has the idea to sell them, and Jerry agrees to help; however, things go wrong when Mama G discovers how good Milton's tamales are and forces him and Jerry to work for her. Later, when Milton and Jerry have had enough, Milton uses an old automatic tamale maker to take down Mama G and her girls. Guest stars: Ian Reed Kesler as Ty, Andy Mackenzie as Longshanks, Lidia Porto as Mama G
74	8	"The Amazing Krupnick"	Sean Lambert	Frank O. Wolff	June 16, 2014	408	0.32
After a new magic shop opens, Milton becomes a magician and forms a group with Jack and Jerry; however, when Milton's performance at a child's birthday party turns out to be boring, Jack and Jerry insist that Milton change his act to make it more exciting, but Milton refuses. Later, Milton is upset when Jack and Jerry betray him and do their own thing. Jack and Jerry later perform the impossible spikes of death trick at another birthday party, but it goes wrong when the lock on Jack's chest does not unlock. Milton gets a hairpin from Mama Sparkle's hair and is able to unlock the lock and save Jack, just in time. Later, Jack is appreciative toward Milton for saving his life. Meanwhile, Taylor's friend Brie shows up at the dojo and insists that Taylor not miss the father-daughter golf tournament this weekend. Taylor does not want to tell Brie the truth about her family, so Rudy steps in to go with her as her uncle. Later, Taylor has had enough of Brie's poor people jokes and bad treatment of her caddie and tells her the truth about how her family lost all of their money and that she would rather be poor and nice than rich and mean. Guest stars: Valorie Hubbard as Mama Sparkle, Veronica Dunne as Taylor, Kaylee Bryant as Tori, Shauna Case as Brie, Robert Curtis Brown as Preston
75	9	"The Battle of Seaford Hill"	Sean Lambert	Itai Grunfeld	June 23, 2014	412	0.48
Milton brings a trunk with artifacts from the Battle of Seaford Hill for a reenactment he will be directing, which Jerry does not like, as it reminds everyone that he is related to the traitor Cook Martinez, who got all his troops sick and almost caused Seaford the battle. Later, Jerry tells everyone that General Douglas was a liar and explains that he found Cook Martinez's diary, which reveals that things played out much differently than what everyone originally thought. Jerry shares a story that explains that General Douglas was selfish and had no respect for his men. After all of General Douglas' soldiers become sick from eating bad meat he brought in, only Cook Martinez and two other cooks are left to do battle with LaPew's army. Later, Cook Martinez and his men sneak into enemy territory and dress up like French chefs to poison LaPew's soldiers with the bad meat. When they are discovered, a fight ensues between them and LaPew, who reveals he has some vegetarian soldiers. The cooks are eventually able to defeat LaPew's soldiers, forcing LaPew to surrender. Later, the cooks tell General Douglas, who had been hiding in a trunk, that they defeated the enemy, but he has them arrested for being traitors and steals all of the glory. After the story, Jack states that Cook Martinez and his men were the real heroes. Later, Milton reveals that a statue of Cook Martinez has been erected so that Seaford can recognize him as the true hero. Jerry is thankful to Milton, who tells him that his family deserves this and it is long overdue. Guest star: Joel McCrary as Bobby Wasabi
76	10	"Fight at the Museum"	Leo Howard	Geoff Barbanell	June 30, 2014	411	0.44
Milton and his friends Sydney and Teddy are volunteers at the museum, along with Chloe, who is the head of the volunteer program, a girl Milton likes. Later, Milton tries to impress Chloe with a haiku at the museum, but when she says that she hopes it is not a love haiku, as every boy volunteer recites one to her in hopes that she will go out with them, he scrambles to think of a new haiku. However, things get more complicated when Jerry also likes Chloe, which causes tensions between him and Milton to rise. Later, Milton and Jerry must work together when they discover that Chloe has been tied up by Ben Franklin and Albert Einstein, who are trying to steal the golden sword from the museum. Ben Franklin and Albert Einstein order their warriors to attack Milton and Jerry, who put up a good fight, but end up being captured. However, the samurai warriors come back to life and force Albert Einstein to retreat and allow Milton and Jerry an opening to kick Ben Franklin into a sarcophagus. After Ben Franklin is trapped, Milton reveals to Chloe that he and Jerry made Ben Franklin and Albert Einstein believe that a legend about the samurai warriors was true, and the samurai warriors reveal themselves to be Sydney and Teddy. Meanwhile, when Jack unknowingly gives an actress back her wallet that she intentionally dropped, he is featured on Don Quiñonas' What Did You Do? Rudy becomes upset with Jack, as he has been wanting to be on the show and comes up with a plan to fake help people in order to get on it. However, it goes wrong when Rudy gets rough with an old lady, who he thinks is the actor he hired. This ruins Rudy's image, and he becomes upset and ends up punching Don Quiñonas in the stomach while at Falafel Phil's Bowl and Burger. Later, when Jack and Rudy are watching the latest episode of What Did You Do? they discover that Rudy saved Don Quiñonas from choking on a falafel ball. Guest stars: Harrison Boxley as Sydney, Brian Patrick Mulligan as Ben Franklin, Robert Pike Daniel as Albert Einstein, Arden Belle as Chloe, Adam Kulbersh as Don Quiñonas
77	11	"Tightroping the Shark"	Bill Shea	Jonathan Howard & Peter Dirksen	July 18, 2014	414	N/A
When Jerry learns from Taylor that two pelicans, who have been mates for seven years, will be separated after the aquarium spent a lot of money on a bull shark tank and can longer afford the pelican habitat, he asks Spanky Danger if he could help by doing a fundraiser at the aquarium. Spanky agrees to help and comes up with the idea to walk the high wire tightrope, but it must be over something scary. Jerry suggests the bull sharks, and Spanky agrees. However, things later go wrong after a rocket bike mishap which reveals that Spanky is a fake and has been using a stunt double. Later, Spanky reveals that a past performance went wrong and mangled him, making him lose his confidence. Jack, Milton, and Jerry give Spanky a pep talk, and he agrees to return to the spotlight, but when the time of the performance comes, Jack receives a text from Spanky, who mentions that he is still scared and not coming. Not wanting to give the audience their money back and disappoint them, Jerry takes it upon himself to attempt the tightrope walk. However, it goes wrong when Jerry loses his balance pole and ends up dangling above the sharks, but Jack is able to walk out onto the tightrope and get Jerry back to safety. Despite Jerry not making it all the way across, the audience still applauds the performance. Guest stars: Veronica Dunne as Taylor, Pat Finn as Spanky Danger
78	12	"Full Metal Jack"	Amanda Bearse	Joel McCrary	July 21, 2014	413	N/A
Jack forms a team with Milton and Jerry for the Commando Battle paintball tournament, but he later abandons them when he thinks they do not have what it takes to win and reveals that he has joined Lieutenant Donovan of the Southhold Military Academy. This upsets Milton and Jerry, who later form their own team with Sydney, much to Jack's shock. Later, only the Wasabi Warriors and Southhold Military Academy teams are left, and Milton comes up with a plan to defeat the enemy. Milton feints surrender, while Sydney zip-lines from behind to act as a target decoy, which gives Milton an opening to take out Jack's team members. This leaves only Milton and Jack, but Milton ends up running out of ammo; however, when Jack is preparing to take him out, he is shot by a paintball. The paintball is revealed to have come from Jerry, who was hiding in camouflage. Jack apologizes to Milton and Jerry for underestimating them. Meanwhile, Rudy tries to get Phil to see a dentist when he realizes that he has a bad tooth; however, Phil reveals that he is afraid of dentists. Later, Rudy is able to get Phil to the dentist office, with the help of Holly, but it goes wrong when Rudy disguises himself as a dentist and accidentally injects himself with syringes containing numbing agents while trying to operate on Phil's tooth. Guest stars: Dan Ahdoot as Phil, Harrison Boxley as Sydney, Brittany Renee Finamore as Holly, Christian Gehring as Lt. Donovan
79	13	"Martinez & Malone: Mall Cops!"	Sean Lambert	Byron Kavanagh	July 28, 2014	415	0.73
Jerry has had enough of his job at Falafel Phil's Bowl and Burger after being vomited on by a customer and goes to work with Joan, who has been looking for a mall cop. Jerry and Joan's first mission is to protect the mayor's son Trevor, who is having a birthday party at Falafel Phil's Bowl and Burger. However, things later go wrong when everyone is held hostage at the birthday party by criminals, who want $50,000 from the mayor in exchange for his son. Later, Jerry and Joan try to escape with Trevor, but they end up leaving him behind, and the criminals take him to a secret hideout and demand another $50,000. However, when the criminals arrive at the secret hideout, Joan reveals that she disguised herself as one of the leader's men. When the police arrive, Jerry reveals that he disguised himself as Trevor and take outs the leader, who is quickly arrested, along with his men. Meanwhile, when Jack and Rudy's sunset karate class and Milton's speed walking club conflict with each other, Milton challenges Jack and Rudy to a speed walk at the park for control of the wharf courtyard. However, when Rudy sprains his ankle, it is up to Jack to go head-to-head with Milton. Later, as Jack and Milton are about to cross the finish line, they get into a fight, but they end up realizing that friends do not act like this and agree to share the wharf. However, Milton betrays Jack and crosses the finish line. Guest stars: Brooke Dillman as Joan, Kevin Farley as Bob, David Figlioli as Slade, Matt Corboy as McGruder
80	14	"Seaford Hustle"	Sean Lambert	Byron Kavanagh	August 4, 2014	409	0.63
Milton is worried about getting into Oxbridge University, so he goes with Jack and Jerry to a frat party being held at Oxbridge to relax. Later, Milton meets a boy named Tom, leader of the Skull and Bones fraternity, who ends up telling him that his father can easily get him into the university. Later, things go wrong when Milton unknowingly helps Tom steal an original Star Wars lightsaber and gets Joan fired in the process. When Milton confronts Tom, Tom explains that every member of Skull and Bones has to steal a valuable item for the legacy room. Tom then reveals that he found a buyer who will give him $20,000 for the lightsaber. Milton threatens to go to the police, but Tom tells him that he will also have to tell them that he was involved. Tom offers Milton a ring that is given to only those who are part of the brotherhood, and Milton accepts it. Later, the buyer shows up to make the trade, but it is quickly interrupted when Joan also shows up and reveals that she has video evidence from Phil's security cameras. When Tom shows Joan the legacy room of everything that has been stolen to try to bribe her, Milton has President McIntyre come into the room, who has been listening the entire time. Milton reveals that the buyer is Rudy, while Joan reveals that the flash drive has nothing on it. McIntyre bans Tom and his fraternity from the university permanently. Meanwhile, Jack participates in the Extreme Road Trip Challenge, but gives Jerry his phone in case Kim calls. Jack manages to win a dirt bike, but when he learns that Jerry rejected calls from Kim, he becomes upset. Later, to make it up to Jack, Jerry has Kim fly out from Japan to surprise Jack. Jerry apologizes to Jack, and Jack forgives him. Special guest star: Olivia Holt as Kim Guest stars: Brooke Dillman as Joan, Nick Clifford as Tom, Connor Weil as J.P.
81	15	"Kickin' It in 'The Office' "	Jim O'Doherty	Jim O'Doherty	November 17, 2014	407	0.46
A TV crew from Black Belt TV arrives to shoot a documentary called Day in the Life of a Dojo. Jack tells Rudy that he is ready to take his sensei test, but Rudy tells him that he does not currently have the time. Later, Jack insists that Rudy give him the test, and Rudy hesitantly agrees; however, he ends up giving Jack endless tests. Jack becomes fed up, and when Rudy invites the Grandmaster to the dojo, Jack uses this to his advantage and has the Grandmaster tell Rudy that he is a fraud and that Rudy never earned his black belt. This makes Rudy a white belt and Jack the highest-ranked member of the dojo. Later, Jack realizes how hard it is to be in charge and tells Rudy the truth. Jack then tells Rudy that he respects his reasons for not making him sensei and gives him his black belt back. Rudy admits that the reason he does not want to make Jack sensei is because he does not want to let him go and is afraid of losing him. Meanwhile, after Milton is pranked by Jerry too many times, he pulls a revenge prank on him by making him think that he is improving on his weightlifting by using fake weights. However, during the Mister Seaford Weightlifting Contest, Jerry cannot lift his dumbbell and falls backward onto the floor. Jerry states that he will no longer prank Milton. Guest stars: Stan Egi as Grandmaster, Ava Davila as Lilly
82	16	"Bringing Down the House"	Sean Lambert	Jim O'Doherty	March 4, 2015	416	0.47
When the Wasabi Warriors unknowingly buy cheap furniture infested with termites for The Seaford Club for Boys, an after-school hangout for troubled boys, they have to come up with a way to raise money to repair the damages. However, they have a limited amount of time to do it, as the city will condemn the building and auction off the property if the money is not raised by the deadline. Jerry gets the idea to do a telethon, and Jack adds that could get rock star Izzy Gunnar and some of his friends to perform. However, things later go wrong when Izzy does not show up, so Rudy sends Milton to ask Jack and Jerry, who have been babysitting two of the troubled boys, for help. Although it is later discovered that Jack and Jerry are unable to help, as they have been terrorized by the boys all day, leading to Jerry's hands being stuck in bowling balls and Jack being in a wheelchair. Milton steps up to the plate and performs a tap dance routine, but that goes wrong when the boys sabotage him. Rudy is upset with the boys, but they tell him that they overheard him say that the only reason he is trying to save the club is to get rid of them. Rudy feels bad and tries to make things right by making a speech about the true intentions of the telethon. The Wasabi Warriors end up raising enough money and save the boys' club. Guest stars: Brooke Dillman as Joan, Dan Ahdoot as Phil, Dan Ahdoot as Furniture Frank, Gunnar Sizemore as Walt, Braden Fitzgerald as Jesse
83	17	"You Don't Know Jack"	Jason Earles	Patrick Bottaro & Chris Phillips	March 11, 2015	417	0.45
Jack brings in Kim to help Jerry train for his black belt test; however, when Jerry keeps slacking off and not taking it seriously, Jack gets fed up and cancels his test and suspends him from the dojo. Later, when Jerry wins at Smack-a-Genie, one of Phil's new games, he wishes that Jack never showed up to the dojo. Jerry is electrocuted; when he comes to, he notices that his wish has come true. However, Jerry starts regretting his wish after he sees that the Wasabi Warrior Academy never happened, Milton dropped out school due to the bullies, and Jack and Kim have become Black Dragons. Later, Milton and Jerry go into the Black Dragon Martial Arts dojo, and while Milton distracts Jack, Kim, and Ty, Jerry plays Smack-a-Genie to try to win another wish. However, Jack, Kim, and Ty realize what is going on and attack Jerry, but he is able to fend them off long enough to win and make another wish, just as Jack punches him out cold. When Jerry comes to, Jack reveals that he had been out for a while. Jerry apologizes to Jack for taking him for granted and tells him that he is going to take his training seriously from now on. Later, Jerry passes his test and earns his black belt, and Jack is proud of him. Special guest star: Olivia Holt as Kim Guest stars: Dan Ahdoot as Phil, Ian Reed Kesler as Ty
84	18	"The Grandmaster"	Sean Lambert	Jim O'Doherty	March 25, 2015	418	0.41
After Kim moves back from Japan, her sensei Grandmaster Tomo is considering making an offer to Rudy to make him sensei at Otai Academy, and he wants to interview everyone to see what kind of sensei Rudy is. In order to make himself look good, Rudy tells everyone to lie and spies on them during their interviews to ensure that they do. However, when Grandmaster Tomo later reveals that he knew Rudy was spying on everyone, he tells him that the offer is off the table since he clearly has something to hide and cannot trust him if he cannot trust his students. Later, Jack, Milton, Jerry, and Kim tell Grandmaster Tomo the truth about who Rudy is and that he is the greatest sensei a student could ask for. Grandmaster Tomo is impressed and later offers Rudy the position of sensei at Otai Academy, which Rudy gladly accepts. However, after hearing all of the nice things everyone says about him at a feast at Falafel Phil's Bowl and Burger and receiving a gift from Jack and the others, Rudy decides not to go to Japan. Later, when everyone comes into the dojo, they are surprised to see that Rudy is still there. When Milton asks Rudy why he decided to stay, he explains that everyone has shown him that he can make a difference in Seaford. Special guest star: Olivia Holt as Kim Guest stars: Brooke Dillman as Joan, Dan Ahdoot as Phil, Hahn Cho as Grandmaster Tomo

== See also ==
- List of Kickin' It characters
