= List of Kickin' It characters =

Kickin' It is an American comedy television series created by Jim O'Doherty that aired on Disney XD from June 13, 2011 to March 25, 2015. The series stars Leo Howard, Dylan Riley Snyder, Mateo Arias, Olivia Holt, Alex Christian Jones, and Jason Earles.

== Main ==
Main characters of Kickin' It in seasons 1–2 from left to right: Rudy, Milton, Jack, Jerry, Kim and Eddie

=== Jack Brewer ===
Jack Brewer (Leo Howard) is the new person in Seaford, whose foremost hobbies are martial arts and skateboarding. He learned karate from his grandfather, who also trained Bobby Wasabi for his movies. He is loyal to his friends and inspires them to give 110%, just as he himself always does. He cannot stand the scent or taste of bleu cheese and also has a phobia of clowns, which he confronted in "Boo Gi Nights". He has great respect for his elders, particularly Rudy, but dislikes being told what to do and being shoved away. He gets jealous when Kim goes around other boys, as seen in "New Jack City". He has skills in martial arts that far surpass those of his friends.

In "Buddyguards", it is revealed that Jack can play guitar. In "Hit the Road Jack", he is offered a chance to go to Japan's Otai Academy; however, he declines since he does not want to leave his friends. In "Kickin' It on Our Own", he and Kim go on a date, and they later begin officially dating in "Two Dates and a Funeral". In "Wasabi Forever", he encourages Kim to go to Otai Academy, and she gives him a cherry blossom to remember her by.

=== Milton ===
Milton David Krupnick (Dylan Riley Snyder) is an honor student who enrolls in martial arts to learn self-defense after being bullied. He is oddly unaware of his own shortcomings and has an awkward sense of confidence. A child prodigy, most school subjects come naturally to him. He has a weird sense of nerd fashion, and once gets food for the dojo when it is about to get smashed. According to his parents, he looked like a baby bird when he was born. He takes pride in having won his school's first-ever spelling bee. His girlfriend is Julie, but he later reveals in "Gabby's Gold" that they broke up. Since their breakup, he becomes overconfident and usually comes on too strong. In "How Bobby Got His Groove Back", it is revealed that he is Jewish.

=== Jerry ===
Jerry Martinez (Mateo Arias) is a lone wolf who ends up at Bobby Wasabi Martial Arts Academy to complete his school PE credit. He speaks Spanish fluently, despite flunking his high school Spanish class, and acts as a bad boy to give himself the illusion of being macho. As a talented dancer, he once invents a move called "The Jerry". While he is more confused than tough, he is fiercely loyal and takes his friendships very seriously. He is willing to try anything at least once and seldom refuses a dare. He has become a better karate student than both Milton and Eddie, as seen in "All the President's Friends", when he fights Frank. He originally works at the Seaford Animal Park, but in "The Boys Are Back in Town", he becomes the manager of Falafel Phil's Bowl and Burger, where it is also revealed that he is a skilled bowler.

In "All the Wrong Moves", it is revealed that his last name is Martinez. In "Reality Fights", it is revealed that Jerry is frightened of saltine crackers. In "Skate Rat", Eddie reveals that Jerry's middle name is Caeser. In "The New Girl", Jerry is revealed to have a lying problem which Milton and Joan try to cure him of, until they realize he is more trouble when he tells the truth, which is also the reason for Milton and Julie breaking up.

=== Kim ===
Kim Crawford (Olivia Holt) is a former Black Dragon, who crossed over from the Black Dragons after they cheated in a tournament. She loves journalism and hates being called just another pretty face. She rarely wears dresses or makeup, except to impress boys. She is co-captain of her high school cheer squad and had a huge crush on teen pop star Ricky Weaver, until he proved to be an utter heel. She is typically the first to stick up for herself and her friends. She has a crush on fellow black belt Jack, but hides it from him and everybody else.

In "Dojo Day Afternoon", it is revealed that Kim's last name is Crawford. In "A Slip Down Memory Lane", it is revealed that she considers Jack as more than just a friend. In "Wazombie Warriors", she goes on a date with Jack. In "Karate Games", she tells Jack that he is amazing and he almost kisses her. In "Kickin' It on Our Own", she and Jack go on another date. In "Jack Stands Alone", it is revealed that her middle name is Beulah. In "Two Dates and a Funeral", she and Jack begin officially dating. In "Wasabi Forever", she is accepted into Otai Academy and leaves for Japan. After sharing a kiss, she gives Jack a cherry blossom petal to remember her by.

=== Eddie ===
Eddie (Alex Christian Jones) is a sweet and uncoordinated youngster who attends Bobby Wasabi Martial Arts Academy to get in shape. He loves the sense of achievement karate gives him. His biggest fear is that if the dojo ever closes, he will be forced by his mother to go back to Mrs. King's Dance Academy. His pet peeve is doing anything he detests, like taking dance or cello lessons, for the sole purpose of impressing others. He embarrasses easily and was once blackmailed by school bully Truman into pulling a series of cruel pranks on his friends. He wants to be an archaeologist when he grows up.

=== Rudy ===
Rudy (Jason Earles) is a third-degree black belt and the sensei of Bobby Wasabi Martial Arts Academy. He was a top amateur martial artist until being sidelined by an injury. He has used his entire life's savings to become co-owner of the Bobby Wasabi Martial Arts Academy chain and takes fierce pride in the fact. Despite his wacky nature and sometimes gross sense of humor, he is a very good, if unorthodox, karate instructor who genuinely identifies with his students and is always ready to back them up when times get rough. After becoming Sam's guardian, Rudy makes Jack his assistant sensei.

In "It Takes Two to Tangle", his last name is revealed to be Gillespie. In "Kickin' It on Our Own", he sells the dojo, but gets it back after winning a match against Kofi Kingston. In "The Boys Are Back in Town", Rudy opens the Wasabi Warrior Academy after a Ferris wheel accident.

== Recurring ==
=== Marge ===
Marge (Loni Love) is Seaford High's lunch lady, who also takes classes at the dojo.

=== Frank ===
Frank (Wayne Dalglish) is a student at Seaford High, who trains with the Black Dragons. He has a crush on Kim, though she does not like him. He is also angered by the fact that she left the dojo after she realized that Ty cheated. It is revealed that he is 19 years old, but still in seventh grade. As revealed by Ty, Frank was hit over the head with a bo staff, which explains his stupidity.

In "Jack Stands Alone", his last name is revealed to be Bickle.

=== Sensei Ty ===
Sensei Ty (Ian Reed Kesler) is the master of the Black Dragons and rival of the Wasabi Warriors, especially Rudy, whom he held a grudge against for 15 years. He and Rudy were studying martial arts with the Grand Master to determine who would get to be the Grand Master's apprentice; during that match, Ty heard a toot and dropped his guard, giving Rudy an opening and the chance to take the win. Ever since, Ty has hated Rudy and vowed to never rest until he got his revenge, even though it was the Grand Master who tooted.

In "Win, Lose or Ty", he and Rudy become friends and share the dojo when Rudy accidentally crashes a monster truck into the Black Dragon Dojo, but they later go back to being enemies. It is shown that he and Rudy are now frenemies and Ty holds a bigger grudge on Rudy.

=== Joan ===
Joan (Brooke Dillman) is a security guard at the strip mall where the Bobby Wasabi Martial Arts Academy is located, who tends to tag along with the Wasabi Warriors. A recurring gag is that Joan rips off her uniform to reveal another outfit underneath that aligns with the episode's main theme.

In "All the President's Friends", her last name is revealed to be Malone. In "Spyfall", an online video that Jerry posts reveals that Joan is out of shape, which nearly causes her to lose her job.

=== Sidney ===
Sidney (Harrison Boxley), spelled Sidney in some episodes, is first seen in "Swords and Magic", as an arch-enemy of Milton during their LARP practices. He is credited as Dark Knight King in that episode. In "Hit the Road Jack", he is wedgied by some unknown bully. He is seen again in "The Sub Sinker" and "School of Jack", as a friend of Milton.

=== Bobby Wasabi ===
Bobby Wasabi (Joel McCrary) is an international movie star and the owner of the Bobby Wasabi chain. Jack's grandfather trained him for all of his movies and now he is overweight.

=== Falafel Phil ===
Phil (Dan Ahdoot) is the owner of the restaurant Falafel Phil's, which is later reinvented as Phil's Bowl and Burger. He came to America with his cousin Carl to open a restaurant, but had creative differences. He has a goat named Tootsie, whom he is extremely fond of. He sometimes competes against Rudy, though both seem to be friends as Rudy invites him on a motorcycle trip and helps babysit his goat when he is out of town. He has a niece named Mika who Jerry dates in the second season.

In "Dueling Dojos", it is revealed that no one mops the floors at the restaurant, Phil does not have a permit to run it, and he does not use real meat.

=== Julie ===
Julie (Hannah Leigh) is a student at Seaford High, who is Milton's former girlfriend and also Ty's niece. She seems to have taken their relationship seriously as she threatened Kim about kissing Milton.

In "The New Girl", she and Milton break up due to Jerry's reformed truth telling.

=== Randy ===
Randy (Evan Hofer) is a student at Seaford High, who enjoys skateboarding and pulling pranks on other people.

=== Principal Funderburk ===
Funderburk (Eric Nenninger) is a gym teacher in the second season, principal in the third season, and an agent in the fourth season. Like other faculty members, he dislikes Jerry due to all the trouble he causes.

In "Home Alone in School", it is shown that he has his own bathroom which he has made into a man cave. In "The Sub Sinker", he becomes the substitute geometry teacher. In "Return of Spyfall", he reveals he is just being a principal to cover up that he is actually a secret government agent; only Jack and Milton only know his secret. In the fourth season, he requests Jack and Milton's help again after Shane reveals himself as a R.A.S.H. agent.

=== Sam ===
Sam (Rio Mangini) is introduced in "Dueling Dojos", where Rudy originally adopts him to look good in front of Grandmaster Po and tries to put Milton and Kim in charge of him. When Sam makes enemies out of all three of them, Rudy decides to give him back. After Sam reveals he has never had a family, Rudy decides to keep him.

In "Two Dates and a Funeral", he is revealed to be a piano prodigy. In "Win, Lose or Ty", it is also revealed that he has no friends.

=== Albert ===
Albert (Jimmy Bellinger) is a nerd, who at first is friends with Milton and Sydney, but later ends up being jealous of Milton. He has a crush on Kim. He seems to be very annoying and tends to jump at the chance to mess with anybody, which usually backfires.

In "The Sub Sinker", he attempts to frame Jerry and get him expelled after he spitballs Milton. However, he did not expect Jerry to study at math and is consequently busted. He later revealed that his jealousy towards Milton was his motive for spitballing him.

== See also ==
- List of Kickin' It episodes
