= Alicia Roth Weigel =

American intersex activist

Human Rights Commissioner of Austin, Texas

Personal details
- Born: Austin, Texas, US
- Party: Democratic
- Education: Cornell University (BA)
- Occupation: Activist, writer

Alicia Roth Weigel is an American writer, political activist, and intersex advocate. She served as a Human Rights Commissioner for Austin, Texas and is the founder of the firm Intrepida Strategy. Weigel, who is intersex, was profiled alongside River Gallo and Sean Saifa Wall in the 2023 documentary film Every Body. She released her memoir, Inverse Cowgirl, in 2023.

== Early life and education ==
Weigel was named after Hurricane Alicia, which hit Texas in 1983, but born in Philadelphia, PA in 1990. When her mother was pregnant with her, she was in a small car accident. Her mother was taken to the hospital where an amniocentesis was performed to ensure the pregnancy had not been terminated. The test revealed that Weigel had XY chromosomes, and so her parents expected to have a baby boy. They had planned to name her Charles, after her father and grandfather, until Weigel's mother gave birth, revealing that Weigel was born with female genitalia.

Doctors determined that Weigel was born with complete androgen insensitivity syndrome, possessing XY chromosomes, a clitoris, and internal testes, and without a uterus or ovaries. Weigel was raised as female and a gonadectomy was performed to remove her testes.

Weigel graduated from the Shipley School in 2008. She went on to earn a Bachelor of Arts degree in Development Economics and Latin American Studies from Cornell University.

== Career ==
=== Political and LGBTQIA activism ===
Since 2017, Weigel has often advocated for legislative change at the Texas State Capitol in Austin, starting with her role as a director for Deeds Not Words—a non-profit organization focused on gender equality. The organization's founder, Democratic politician Wendy Davis, was her personal mentor and recruited Weigel to work for Deeds Not Words in 2016. Weigel was the campaign manager for Danielle Skidmore's City Council race, one of the first openly transgender people to run for public office in Texas. She also served as Secretary of Austin Young Democrats.

Weigel campaigned against Bill 6, a bathroom bill, in the Texas State Senate. After consulting Davis and Skidmore, Weigel decided to come out as intersex before the Texas State Legislature while speaking against the proposed legislation.

Since coming out, Weigel has worked as an advocate and activist for intersex rights. She was one of three intersex people featured in Julie Cohen's 2023 documentary Every Body. She speaks out against surgical procedures performed on intersex children without their consent.

Weigel also worked as a partner for the Pride Fund, which invests money in LGBTQIA-led companies. She served as a Human Rights Commissioner of Austin, and collaborated with lawmakers to reduce sexual assault, and human trafficking through legislation and also introduced legislation that funds reproductive rights and mandates paid sick leave. Weigel is also a speaker represented by the Collective Speakers bureau and founded the firm Intrepida Strategy. In 2023, Weigel partnered with Texas Health Action to launch the nation's first ever intersex care offering for adult patients through their Kind Clinics.

In 2019, she was awarded the Ceci Gratias Guardian Award by the Austin LGBT Chamber of Commerce.

=== Writing ===
Weigel has written for The New York Times, Time Magazine, The Austin Chronicle, Austin Woman and has been featured in the Daily Mail, NPR's Fresh Air and Forbes.

In 2023, Weigel published her memoir, Inverse Cowgirl.

== Personal life ==
Weigel lives in Austin, Texas. She is Jewish and studies Kabbalah.

She was diagnosed with osteoporosis.
