= Moisés Arias =

American actor (born 1994)

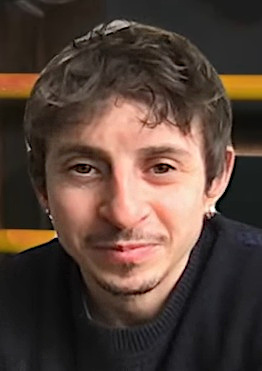
- Born: April 18, 1994 (age 32); New York City, U.S.
- Parents: César Arias (father); Monica Arias (mother)
- Relatives: Mateo Arias (brother)

Moisés Arias (born April 18, 1994) is an American actor and photographer. He portrayed Rico in the Disney Channel series Hannah Montana, Biaggio in the 2013 Sundance film The Kings of Summer, Cokestraw in the 2019 SXSW comedy-drama The Wall of Mexico, Bigfoot in the Colombian war drama Monos, and Norm MacLean in the Amazon Prime Video drama series Fallout. He has also appeared in Pitch Perfect 3, Five Feet Apart, Ender's Game, The Stanford Prison Experiment, American Murderer, Jockey, The Perfect Game, The Middle, and The King of Staten Island.

== Early life ==
Moisés Arias was born on April 18, 1994, in New York City, the son of Mónica and César Arias. His parents are Colombian, and he was raised bilingual. His brother is Kickin' It actor Mateo Arias. Before starting his acting career, Moisés graduated from Barbizon Modeling and Acting School in Tampa, Florida.

== Career ==
=== 2006–2012: Early work & child stardom ===
He appeared in music videos for Pearl Jam, the Jonas Brothers (for their song "SOS"), and Parmalee. Arias also appeared in the 2006 film Nacho Libre in a minor role. He participated in the 2009 Guadalajara Film Festival during the presentation of the film The Perfect Game with Eva Longoria.

Arias appeared in Beethoven's Big Break in 2008. He appeared on the ESPN family of networks as a roving 'sideline' reporter conducting interviews with fans and players at the 2009 Little League World Series. He appeared in Wizards of Waverly Place and played Conscience, Max (Jake T. Austin)'s conscience.

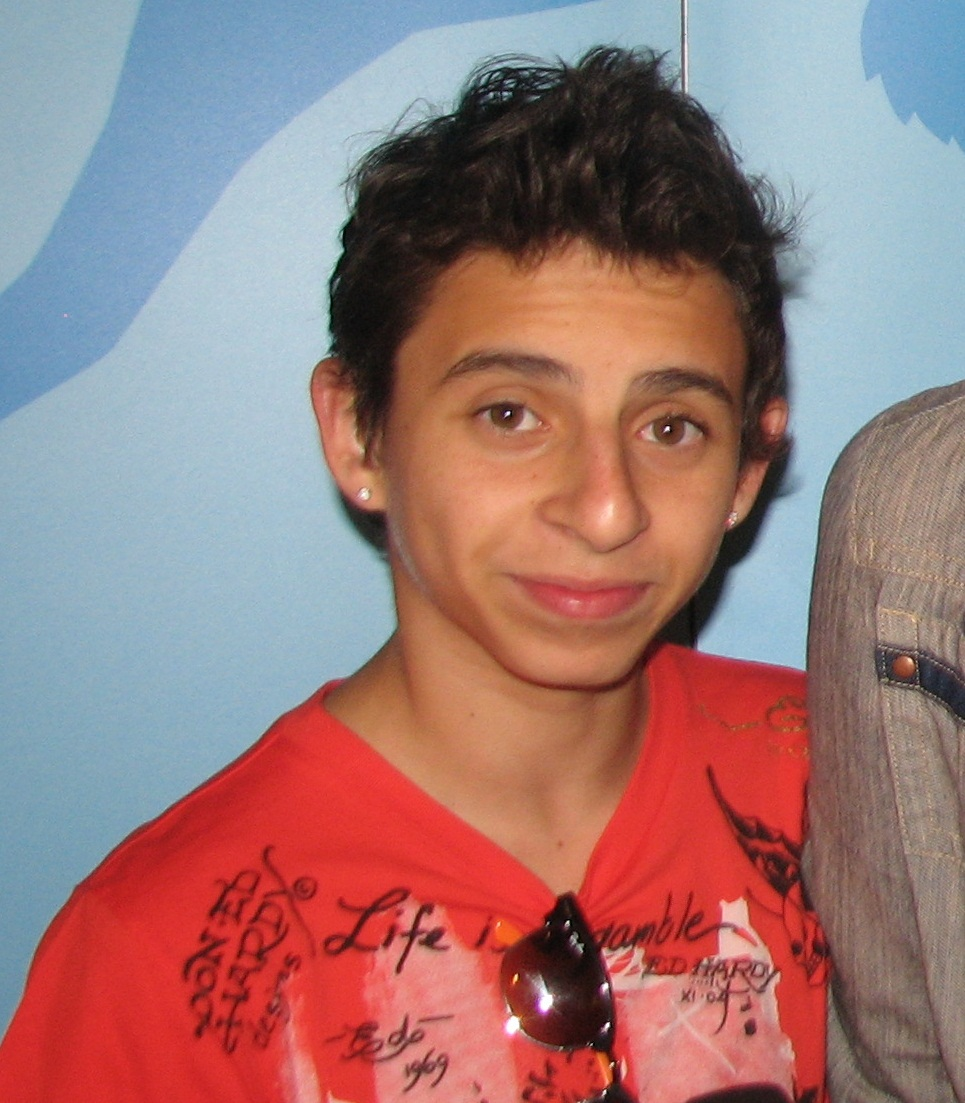
Moisés Arias in 2010

Arias and his brother directed a series of YouTube films under the user name Moiswashere. In 2009, they worked on a film called Motocross Madness.

In 2012, Arias co-founded MSFTSrep, a youth collective and fashion brand alongside Jaden Smith, Willow Smith, and Mateo Arias.

=== 2013–present ===
In 2013, Arias co-starred in The Kings of Summer, which had its premiere on January 19, 2013, at the 2013 Sundance Film Festival to positive reviews. Arias later expressed that it was one of his favorite films that he's done and deemed the film to be "the turning point in my career." Also that year, he appeared in a prominent supporting role in the science fiction film Ender's Game, starring Asa Butterfield, Abigail Breslin and Harrison Ford.

In March 2019, Arias played Poe in the CBS film Five Feet Apart, starring with Cole Sprouse.

In 2024, Arias appeared in the Amazon Prime Video series Fallout, based on the video game series of the same name.

== Personal life ==
In May 2014, Arias, who was 20, was photographed shirtless sitting on a bed with 13-year-old Willow Smith, who was clothed. The photo triggered an investigation into the Smith family by the Los Angeles County Department of Children and Family Services. The family was cleared.

== Filmography ==
=== Film ===
Key
†	Denotes films that have not yet been released

Year	Title	Role	Notes
2006	Nacho Libre	Juan Pablo	
2008	Beethoven's Big Break	Billy	
2009	The Perfect Game	Mario Ontiveros	
2009	Hannah Montana: The Movie	Rico Suave	
2009	Astro Boy	Zane (voice)	
2012	We the Party	Quicktime	
2012	Arrietty	Spiller (voice)	American dub
2012	Noobz	Hollywood	
2013	The Kings of Summer	Biaggio	
2013	Despicable Me 2	Antonio Perez (voice)	
2013	Ender's Game	Bonzo Madrid	
2015	The Stanford Prison Experiment	Anthony Carroll	
2016	The Land	Junior	
2016	Ben-Hur	Dismas	
2017	Kong: Skull Island	Bar Guest	Cameo
2017	Pitch Perfect 3	Pimp-Lo	
2017	Life Boat	Patagrande	
2018	Little Bitches	Phil	
2019	Five Feet Apart	Poe Ramirez	
2019	The Wall of Mexico	Cokestraw	
2019	Monos	Bigfoot	
2020	Blast Beat	Mateo Andres	
2020	The King of Staten Island	Igor	
2021	Jockey	Gabriel Boullait	
2022	American Murderer	Kyle Wallace	
2022	Samaritan	Reza Smith	
2023	Divinity	Star	
TBA	52nd State †	Felipe	Post-production
TBA	The Take †		Post-production

=== Television ===
Year	Title	Role	Notes
2005	Everybody Hates Chris	Kid #5	Episode: "Everybody Hates Sausage"
2006	The Emperor's New School	Marcus (voice)	Episode: "Rabbit Face"
2006	Dive Olly Dive!	Olly (voice)	
2006	The Suite Life of Zack & Cody	Randall	Episode: "Day Care"
2006–2011	Hannah Montana	Rico Suave	Recurring role (season 1); main role (seasons 2–4)
2006–2008	Disney Channel Games	Himself	Contestant
2009	Dadnapped	André	Television film
2009	Wizards of Waverly Place	Max's conscience	Episodes: "Monster Hunter", "Three Monsters" and "Lazerama"
2009	Phineas and Ferb	Fred (voice)	Episode: "Phineas and Ferb's Quantum Boogaloo"
2011	Love Bites	Jeff	Episode: "Sky High"
2012	The Middle	Matt	Recurring role (season 3)
2017	Jean-Claude Van Johnson	Luis	Main role
2019	The Good Doctor	Luca Jones	Episode: "Fractured"
2021	City of Ghosts	Prizrak	Podcast, 4 episodes
2024–present	Fallout	Norm MacLean	Main role

=== Music videos ===
Year	Title	Artist	Notes
2007	"S.O.S"	Jonas Brothers	
2012	"Gonzoes"	Jaden Smith	
2012	"The Coolest"	Jaden Smith	

== Awards and nominations ==
Year	Award	Category	Nominated work	Result	Ref.
2009	30th Young Artist Awards	Best Performance in a TV Series (Comedy or Drama) - Supporting Young Actor	Hannah Montana	Nominated	
2020	Latino Entertainment Journalists Association Film Awards	Best Performance by an Actor in a Supporting Role	Monos	Nominated	
2021	CinEuphoria Awards	Best Supporting Actor - International Competition	Monos	Nominated	
2021	Macondo Awards	Premios Macondo - Best Actor	Monos	Nominated	
2022	C&I Movie and TV Awards	Best Supporting Actor	Jockey	Nominated	
