= Howdy, Neighbor! =

2023 horror film directed by Allisyn Snyder

- Directed by: Allisyn Snyder
- Written by: Matthew Scott Montgomery
- Produced by: Allisyn Snyder; Charles M. Barsamian; Matthew Scott Montgomery
- Starring: Matthew Scott Montgomery; Grant Jordan; Debby Ryan; Sterling Sulieman
- Cinematography: Dylan Riley Snyder
- Edited by: Bryan Morrison
- Music by: Steve Arm
- Production companies: Watch the Footage Productions; Exit Strategy Productions; Traction Pictures
- Release dates: July 2, 2023 (Soho Horror Film Festival); October 11, 2023 (Screamfest Horror Film Festival)
- Running time: 80 minutes
- Country: United States
- Language: English

Howdy, Neighbor! is a 2023 American screenlife horror film directed by Allisyn Snyder. It stars Matthew Scott Montgomery, Grant Jordan, Debby Ryan, and Sterling Sulieman.

== Premise ==
Benjamin Caldwell (Matthew Scott Montgomery) is a former child actor turned queer millennial adult living in Los Angeles. Despite his attempts to distance himself from it, he agrees to attend an online reunion show for Howdy, Neighbor!, the sitcom that made him a child star in the role of Bucky the farm boy. When he meets his new neighbour Chase Mitchell (Grant Jordan), Chase reveals himself to be Bucky's number one fan. As he struggles with the blurred line between friendship and fandom, Benjamin and his best friend Harley Walker (Debby Ryan) begin investigating Chase. They soon find out that not everything is as it seems, and Benjamin's life gets turned upside down.

== Cast ==
- Matthew Scott Montgomery as Benjamin Caldwell
- Grant Jordan as Chase Mitchell
- Debby Ryan as Harley Walker
- Sterling Sulieman as Marcus Lockamy
- Alyson Stoner as Amber
- Kimmy Shields as Katie
- Tim Bagley as Vell Cantrell
- Greer Grammer as Diamond Hopkins
- Kevin Chamberlin as Vinnie Mason
- Adam Faison as Jack Flash
- Nina Millin as Chelsea Kennedy
- Peter James Smith as Stefan
- Shayne Topp as Officer Crowley
- Damien Haas as Officer Jackson
- Misha Reeves as Harley's Mom

== Production ==
Matthew Scott Montgomery and Allisyn Snyder originally met as children while working on the Disney Channel original show So Random! During their tenure, both experienced incidents of stalking, cyberstalking, and harassment. Montgomery drew heavily from these experiences when writing the screenplay for Howdy, Neighbor!, and used the screenlife format to explore the nuances and dangers of parasocial interaction. He later pitched the idea to Snyder, who agreed to both direct the film and finance it through she and her husband's production company Watch the Footage Productions. Later Bob Morrison and Charles Barsamian of Exit Strategy Productions and Jason Tamasco of Traction Pictures were brought on to produce the film.

In July 2022, Variety revealed the cast list, which was primarily composed of ex-Disney Channel child stars. Snyder later noted this was an intentional choice, as she wanted to cast people who had similar personal experiences with stalkers. Production started in late July 2022 and was filmed using the Blackmagic Pocket Cinema Camera. The entire project was filmed in 10 days and spent over a year in post-production.

== Release ==
The film premiered in the UK on July 2, 2023, at the SOHO Horror Film Festival as a part of its online SOHOme Horror Pride series. It had its US premier at the Screamfest Horror Film Festival on October 11, 2023.

Howdy, Neighbor! primary received positive reviews with critic Fred Topel calling it as "a clever update on stalker fears" and Steph Cannon of Horror Buzz calling it a "gripping, innovative take on the found footage genre with outstanding performances."

The film did not initially receive a broader distribution outside of film festivals. However, in 2025, Deadline reported that Timur Bekmambetov would be seeking a distributor for the film through his new company Screenlifer, which focuses on promoting films that use the screenlife format.
