= Tri-City Christian School =

Tri-City Christian School may refer to:

- Tri-City Christian School (California), a private Christian school located in Vista
- Tri-City Christian School (North Carolina), a pre-K–12th grade private Christian school located in Conover
