= Leo Howard =

American actor, director and martial artist (born 1997)

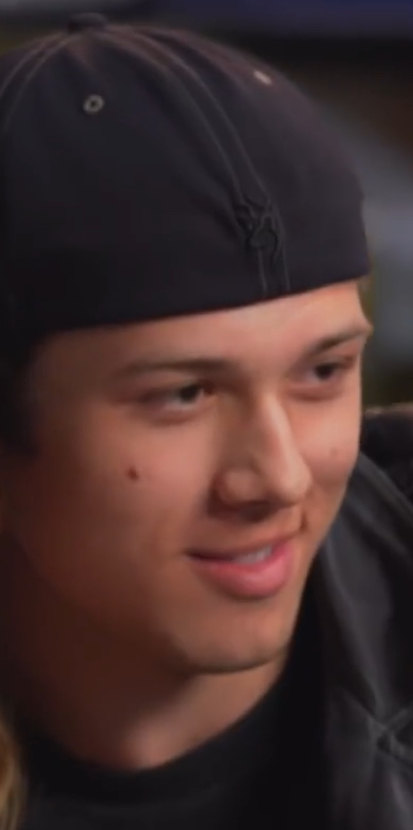
- Howard in 2016
- Born: July 13, 1997 (age 29); Newport Beach, California, U.S.
- Occupations: Actor; martial artist; director; musician
- Years active: 2001–present
- Spouse: Natasha Hall (m. 2024)
- Father: Todd Howard
- Website: leo-howard.com

Leo Howard (born July 13, 1997) is an American actor, director, musician and martial artist. Known for incorporating his karate skills into his roles across film and television, his accolades include a Young Artist Award.

Howard started acting as a child and gained early attention with his film debut as young Snake Eyes in G.I. Joe: The Rise of Cobra (2009) and his titular leading role in Leo Little's Big Show (2009–2010), his first of many projects with Disney. His breakthrough came with the role of Jack Brewer in Disney XD's Kickin' It (2011–2015), which he followed with a recurring role in the third season of Disney Channel's Shake It Up (2013). For Kickin' It, he directed the fourth season episode "Fight at the Museum" at age 16, garnering recognition as the youngest director in television history. Howard also directed two episodes of Gamer's Guide to Pretty Much Everything (2016–2017).

Howard took on roles in a number of television series of the horror genre, with Freakish (2016–2017) and Santa Clarita Diet (2018–2019), followed by the crime drama Why Women Kill (2019), and fantasy Legacies (2019–2022). From 2024, he has portrayed Tate Black in the NBC soap opera Days of Our Lives.

== Early life and education ==
Howard was born July 13, 1997, in Newport Beach, California. He is the son of Randye (née Dworsky) and Todd "The Big Bulldog" Howard. His parents are professional dog breeders and operate The Big Bulldog Ranch, where they specialize in breeding English and French bulldogs. His father is also an eviction specialist and process server starring in Spike TV's World's Worst Tenants. He attended Tri-City Christian School in Vista, California. Howard spent much of his childhood growing up in the small town of Fallbrook in Northern San Diego County, before devoting himself to a full-time acting career.

== Career ==
=== 2001–2014: Rise to prominence ===
Howard developed an interest in martial arts at age four in 2001 and began studying when his parents enrolled him at a dojo in Oceanside, California. A year later, his parents enrolled him at another dojo which specialized in the Okinawan discipline of Shōrin-ryū and at the age of seven, he began developing his extreme martial arts skills by adding gymnastics to his routine. Howard began training under martial arts world champion Matt Mullins when Mullins made an exception allowing Howard to become the youngest student in his class. By the age of eight, Howard had won three world championships. His specialty is Shōrin-ryū, in which he holds a black belt.

At age nine, Howard became the youngest member to perform with Mullins' Sideswipe Performance Team, a traveling martial arts-based group that entertains audiences across the country with a combination of martial arts, dance and acrobatics. In June 2011, Howard spoke of the experience performing with Sideswipe: "I think that's what really got me addicted to performing. My role changed as I've grown as a performer and just plain grown. I was OK, I wasn't that great at the start, so they would do cool moves and then poof! There'd be this cute kid running out there to do some karate. But for the last couple of years I've been one of the main performers."

From a young age, Howard was a fan of Bruce Lee and Chuck Norris films, and admired their ability to incorporate martial arts into their acting. At the age of seven, Howard told his mother that he wanted to be an actor. It was at a martial arts tournament that Howard was first spotted by someone who thought he had the looks to go into show business and referred him to their talent agent. This led to work as a model for print advertorials and then as an actor in commercials. In 2010, Howard remembered his excitement about breaking into show business, saying, "The commercials were just insane to me. Getting a commercial was like getting a lead role in a movie to me."

In 2005, Howard made his television debut shortly before his eighth birthday with a small guest-starring role on the USA Network series, Monk dressed as a "little karate kid" for Halloween, his one line in the episode being "Maybe he's afraid of karate". Howard would spend the next several years performing with Sideswipe Performance Team before returning to acting in 2009.

In 2009, Howard landed his first steady job interviewing celebrities as "Leo Little", the host of the short-form Disney Channel talk show series, Leo Little's Big Show and made his feature film debut as "Eric Brooks" in the family film Aussie and Ted. In August of that year, Howard gained notoriety for his martial arts skills when he appeared as "Young Snake-Eyes", performing all of his own stunts in a flashback scene for the Paramount action-adventure film G.I. Joe: The Rise of Cobra. Later that same month, he appeared in a co-starring role as "Laser", one of the three "Short" brothers in the family comedy film Shorts, which earned the cast the Young Artist Award for that year as "Best Young Ensemble Cast". In November 2009, Howard began a recurring role as "Hart Hamlin" on the Disney XD series, Zeke and Luther. In 2010, Howard landed in his first leading role playing "Logan Hoffman" in the independent feature film, Logan.

In August 2010, Howard starred as "Young Conan", once again performing all of his own stunts in the sword and sorcery film, Conan the Barbarian. The film received mixed reviews, but Howard was praised for his performance, with film critic, Ty Burr of The Boston Globe writing, "The star (Jason Momoa) is arguably outshined by Leo Howard, the feral 13-year-old actor who plays the young Conan in the opening scenes." In an interview with Empire, director Marcus Nispel spoke of working with Howard: "After we finished the film, I went to Lionsgate and said 'Y'know, the movie to do next is Conan: The Early Years.' Leo absolutely blew me away. Almost the entire first act of Conan is the kid, which is unheard of. At the start, reading the script, everyone was like 'We have to cut that down to ten minutes'. And now everyone's like ‘Can we make that longer?!' He worked out like a charm. There aren't many young actors who could carry that sort of weight."

In June 2010, Howard landed a starring role as "Jack", a teenage karate expert who befriends a group of high school misfits on the Disney XD comedy series, Kickin' It. Howard recalled his reaction when he first got the script to audition for the show, saying, "I saw it was a martial arts show and I thought, 'Oh! I have to do this!'" With Howard receiving top billing and performing all of his own stunts, the series quickly became Disney XD's number 1 original series in the network's history, and would run for four seasons.

=== 2015–2018: Andron and Freakish ===
In 2015, Howard played Alexander in the film Andron alongside Gale Harold, Danny Glover and Alec Baldwin. He also guest starred on the fourth season of Lab Rats as Troy West. In October 2016, Howard lead the Hulu original teen horror series Freakish as Grover Jones, only to be cancelled two years later in July 2018.

=== 2019–present: Career expansion ===
In 2019, Howard landed a recurring role in Why Women Kill as Tommy Harte, an eighteen-year-old who leads Simone, a woman dealing with a divorce after she realized her husband was gay, into having an affair with him. In 2019, he joined the second season of The CW television series Legacies as Ethan Machando, before being promoted to a series regular role for the series' third season. In 2014, alongside Caity Lotz and Michael Biehn, he starred in the martial arts prison thriller The Lockdown. In 2023, Howard joined the cast of Days of Our Lives in the role of Tate Black; he made his first appearance on April 5, 2024.

== Other ventures ==
=== Musical career ===
In 2017, Howard and his band Ask Jonesy & Company, composed of Troy Romzek (lead vocals/guitar), Leo (lead guitar/vocals) and Ricky Ficarelli (bass/vocals) released their first single, "Burning Fire." They released their first album in June 2018.

=== Screenwriting and directing ===
In 2014, Howard made his directorial debut with the Season 4 episode "Fight At The Museum", where he was titled by Guinness World Records as the youngest TV director ever. In March 2016, he directed two episodes of Gamer's Guide to Pretty Much Everything, effectively ending his contract with Disney.

== Personal life ==
=== Relationships and family ===
Howard was home schooled to accommodate his busy work schedule on Kickin' It and spent most of his time living in the Howard family's home in Studio City, California when he worked, but still considered his childhood town of Fallbrook home. While still devoted to his passion for martial arts, Howard has stated that he has become more careful when it comes to "fighting" and "sparring" matches, due to the potential for injuries that could interfere with his obligations as an actor. In September 2024, he wed actress Natasha Hall.

Howard's hobbies include cooking, playing guitar and collecting antique weapons, including swords and knives. The centerpiece of his collection being the big "Conan" sword that was presented to him after filming ended on Conan the Barbarian. Howard has expressed a love for animals and has a pet sheepdog named "Murphy". He is also interested in veterinary medicine and volunteers at his local veterinary clinic in his free time.

== Filmography ==
=== Film ===
Year	Title	Role
2009	Aussie and Ted's Great Adventure	Eric Brooks
2009	G.I. Joe: The Rise of Cobra	Snake Eyes (young)
2009	Shorts	Laser Short
2010	Logan	Logan Hoffman
2011	Conan the Barbarian	Conan the Barbarian (young)
2014	Andron	Alexander
2017	You're Gonna Miss Me	Mav Montana
2024	The Lockdown	Jack Hightower

=== Television ===
Year	Title	Role	Notes
2005	Monk	Little Karate Kid	Episode: "Mr. Monk Goes Home Again"
2009–2010	Zeke & Luther	Hart Hamlin	Episodes: "Crash Dummies", "Luther Waffles: Skate Cop"
2009–2011	Leo Little's Big Show	Leo Little	Main role
2011	PrankStars	Himself	Episode: "Stick it to Me"
2011–2015	Kickin' It	Jack Brewer	Main role
2013	Shake It Up	Logan Hunter	Recurring role (season 3)
2015	Lab Rats: Bionic Island	Troy West	Episode: "Bionic Action Hero"
2016	Major Crimes	Gabe Young	Episode: "Present Tense"
2016–2017	Freakish	Grover Jones	Main role
2016–2018	WTH: Welcome to Howler	Gordie	Main role; web series
2018–2019	Santa Clarita Diet	Sven	4 episodes
2019	Why Women Kill	Tommy Harte	Main role (season 1)
2020	The 100	August kom Trikru	Episode: "Anaconda"
2019–2022	Legacies	Ethan Machado	Recurring role (season 2); Main role (seasons 3–4)
2024–present	Days of Our Lives	Tate Black	Main role

=== Video games ===
Year	Title	Role	Notes
2026	Star Wars: Zero Company	Bennic Halloren	

=== Music video ===
Year	Title	Artist
2016	''History''	Olivia Holt

=== Director ===
Year	Title	Notes
2014	Kickin' It	Episode: "Fight at the Museum"
2016–2017	Gamer's Guide to Pretty Much Everything	Episodes: "The Rock Band", "The Rodeo"

== Awards and nominations ==
Year	Award	Category	Role	Work	Result	Ref.
2010	Young Artist Award	Best Performance in a Feature Film – Young Ensemble Cast (shared with Jimmy Bennett, Jake Short, Devon Gearhart, Jolie Vanier and Trevor Gagnon)	Laser Short	Shorts	Won	
