= Todd Howard (TV personality) =

American entrepreneur (born 1965)

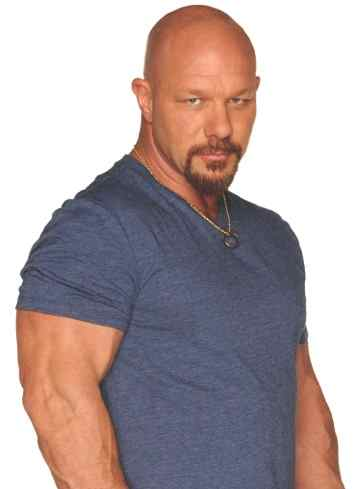
- Howard in 2013
- Born: Todd Farrell Howard; 1965 (age 60–61)
- Occupations: Entrepeneur; actor; TV personality
- Spouse: Randye Howard (m. 1996)
- Children: Leo Howard

Todd Farrell Howard (born August 1965) is an American entrepreneur. He co-produced and starred in Spike TV’s hit series World's Worst Tenants.

Todd's father was an embalmer. After joining the U.S. Marines in 1983 and being honorably discharged in 1987, he launched his own workout wear manufacturing company in 1995 which evolved into a successful chain of sports nutrition stores by 1999. He has established himself by building various types of businesses, including real estate holdings, property management, motivational speaking, personal training, nutritional counseling, and Bulldog breeding and rescue.

Todd is a principal in MooreHoward Investments LLC. They currently manage all of the 110 properties that they personally own. Their portfolio consists primarily of residential with commercial buildings and raw land development projects.

Todd and his wife Randye Dworsky are parents of Kickin' It star Leo Howard. Todd himself also appeared in one episode of the show.
