= Esteban Arango =

Colombian American filmmaker

- Born: Bogotá, Colombia
- Occupation: Film director

Esteban Arango is a Colombian American filmmaker.

== Early life and education ==
Arango was born in Bogotá, Colombia and moved with his family to the United States in 2000. He graduated with a bachelor's degree in communications from Florida International University.

== Career ==
After graduating college, Arango worked as a creative producer at the Discovery Channel.

Arango's feature-length debut, Blast Beat, adapted from his 2015 short film of the same name, premiered at the 2020 Sundance Film Festival. That year, he was named one of 10 Directors to Watch by Variety.

Ponyboi, directed by Arango and written by and starring River Gallo, premiered at the 2024 Sundance Film Festival.

== Filmography ==
Year	Title	Notes	Ref.
2015	Blast Beat	Short film	
2020	Blast Beat	—N/a	
2024	Ponyboi	—N/a	

== Awards and nominations ==
Year	Award	Category	Nominated work	Result	Ref.
2016	Clermont-Ferrand International Short Film Festival	International Competition	Blast Beat	Nominated	
2020	Sundance Film Festival	U.S. Dramatic Competition	Blast Beat	Nominated	
2020	Palm Springs International Film Festival	Directors to Watch	Blast Beat	Won (Note: One of ten winners.)	
2024	Sundance Film Festival	U.S. Dramatic Competition	Ponyboi	Nominated	
