= Mikey Reid =

American actor (born 1992)

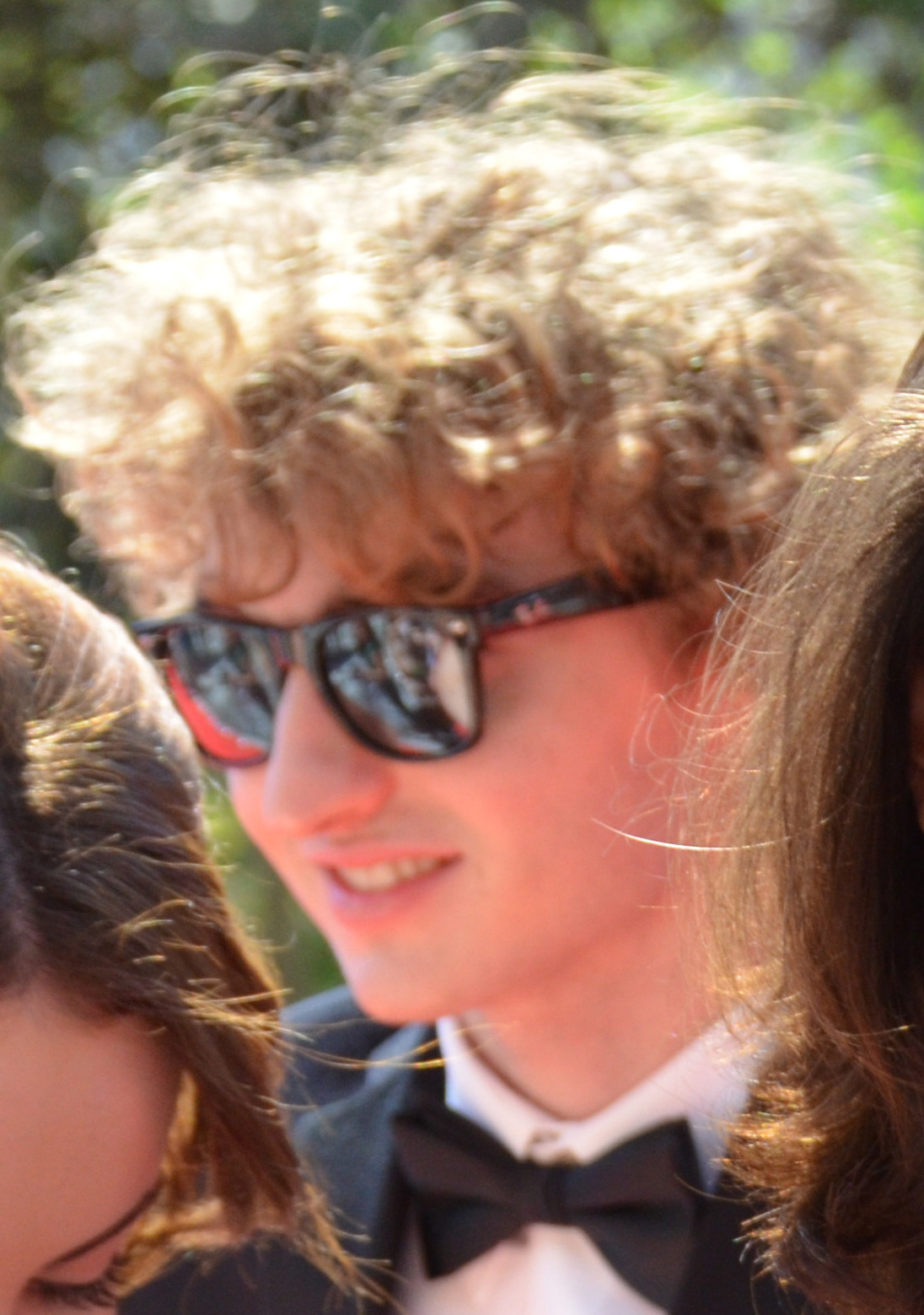
- Reid in 2012
- Born: Michael Eric Reid; December 30, 1992 (age 33); The Bronx, New York, U.S.
- Occupation: Actor
- Years active: 2003–present

Michael Eric Reid (born December 30, 1992) is an American actor and comedian. He is best known for his role as Sinjin Van Cleef in Victorious.

== Career ==
He has appeared on Saturday Night Live, Last Call with Carson Daly, Late Show with David Letterman and other television shows. From 2010 to 2013, he played Sinjin Van Cleef on Victorious, a role he has been best remembered for. Reid appeared in Mamaboy as Ditto, the best friend of the lead character Kelly Hankins, a high school student who must hide the fact that he has become pregnant.

== Personal life ==
Reid grew up in Yonkers, New York. He is Jewish.

== Filmography ==
=== Films ===
Year	Film	Role
2009	Fame	Red Haired Boy
2009	House of D	Donald Uncredited
2015	The Funhouse Massacre	Mikey
2016	Mamaboy	Ditto
2017	The Honor Farm	Jesse
2018	Camp Cold Brook	Kevin

=== Television ===
Year	Film	Role	Notes
2003	Saturday Night Live	Little Boy in Baseball Costume	Episode: Halle Berry/Britney Spears
2004	Law & Order: Criminal Intent	Nicky Carlotta	Episode: "F.P.S."
2004	Ed	Kareem	Episode: "Hidden Agendas"
2008	Miss Guided	Roger	Episode: "Hot Sub and The List"
2009	Weeds	Fanboy	Episode: "Glue"
2010	Career Version	Bobby Watson	Short
2010–13	Victorious	Sinjin Van Cleef	Recurring role
2011	Marvin the Matador	Marvin	Short
2011	Home Game	Nathan	Unsold television pilot
2011	Workaholics	Kid Chef	Episode: "The Promotion"
2011	iCarly	Sinjin Van Cleef	Crossover episode: "iParty with Victorious"
2011	Modern Family	Abraham	Episode: "After the Fire"
2013	Teens Wanna Know	Guest	34th Young Artist Awards
2014	Sam & Cat	Himself	Episode: "#BlooperEpisode"
2018	The Blacklist	W.P. Frost	Episode: "Nicholas T. Moore"
2021	Paradise City	Mehoves	Recurring role
