= Allie DeBerry =

American actress and model

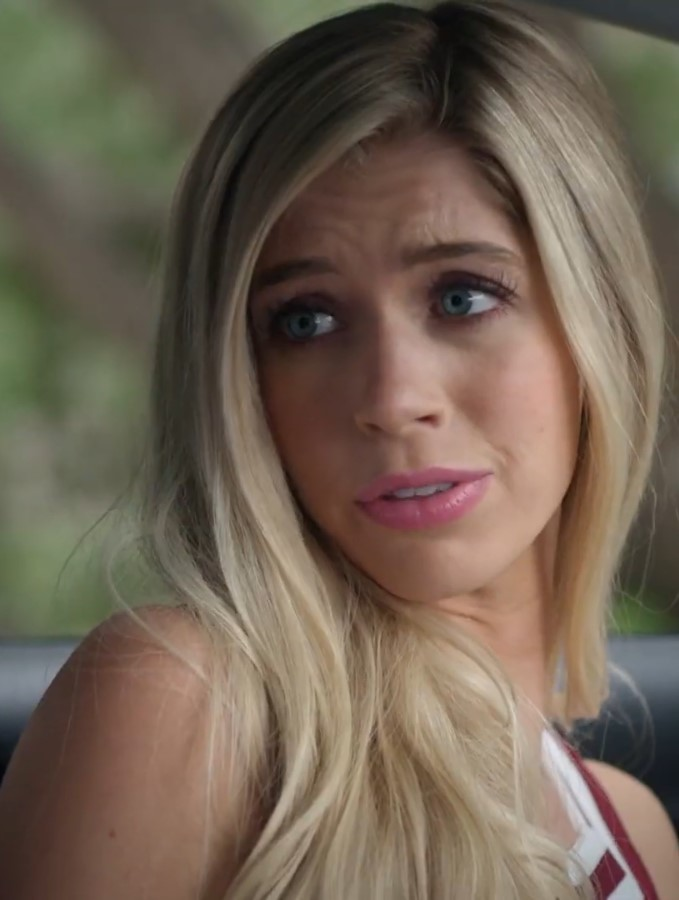
- DeBerry in the film The Secret Life of Cheerleaders in 2019
- Born: Alexandria Danielle DeBerry; October 26, 1994 (age 32); Houston, Texas, U.S.
- Other name: Alexandria DeBerry
- Occupations: Actress, model
- Years active: 2001–present
- Spouse: Tyler Beede (m. 2017)
- Children: 2

Alexandria Danielle DeBerry (born October 26, 1994) is an American actress and model. She is best known for her roles in A.N.T. Farm as Paisley Houndstooth, Shake It Up as Destiny, Lazer Team as Mindy and True Jackson, VP as Cammy.

== Early life ==
DeBerry was born October 26, 1994, in the Kingwood neighborhood of Houston, Texas, the youngest of three children of Tom, a teacher and Cindy DeBerry. She attended public school at Woodland Hills Elementary, Kingwood Middle School, and Kingwood Park High School.

== Acting career ==
DeBerry's acting career officially began in 2001 where she played a flower girl in the TV film The Way She Moves. Also that year (2001) she guest starred as Brittany in It's a Miracle. In 2003, DeBerry landed a guest role in television series I'm with Her as young Alex. DeBerry had her first theatrical film in 2007 in Love and Mary as Sara Pedersen. The following year she continued her television career and booked the series What's the Word? which she was featured in two episodes. In 2009, DeBerry became more noticed for her guest role in the TV show True Jackson, VP, portraying the role of Cammy, a friend of Pinky played by Jennette McCurdy.

DeBerry was then featured on Disney Channel as she guest starred in Shake It Up; her role was Destiny (Flynn's crush) in the episode "Hook It Up". For 31 episodes, DeBerry appeared as Paisley Houndstooth on Disney Channel's comedy series A.N.T. Farm. DeBerry took on the female lead of Mindy in Rooster Teeth's first feature-length film Lazer Team.

DeBerry starred in Mamaboy as Lisa Weld, daughter of Reverend Weld played by Stephen Tobolowsky.

== Personal life ==
DeBerry is a Christian. She married professional baseball player Tyler Beede in November 2017. In April 2022, DeBerry announced via her Instagram account that she was pregnant with her first child expected for October. Their son was born in September 2022.

== Filmography ==
=== Film ===
Year	Title	Role	Notes
2001	The Way She Moves	Flower Girl	TV film; film debut
2007	Love and Mary	Sara Pedersen	Theatrical film debut
2013	The Starving Games	Video Girl	Cameo
2014	Mission Air	Sophie	
2015	Hoovey	Annie	
2015	Pass the Light	Jackie	
2015	The Adventures of Pepper and Paula	Kylie	
2015	Spirit Riders	Kacie	
2015	Lazer Team	Mindy	
2015	A Haunting in Cawdor	Jeanette Welles	
2016	Slash	Jessie	
2016	Mamaboy	Lisa Weld	
2016	Fashionista	Sherry	
2016	A Midsummer's Hawaiian Dream	Hermione	Television film
2017	Lazer Team 2	Mindy	
2018	My Teacher, My Obsession	Tricia	Television film
2018	Tales from the Hood 2	Audrey	
2018	A Woman's Nightmare	Anna Peterson	Television film
2019	Deadly Excursion	Ellie McCarthy	Television film
2019	The Legend Of 5 Mile Cave	Josie Hayes	
2019	90 Feet from Home	Amber-Lynn	
2019	Round of Your Life	Bailey	
2019	Secrets at the Lake	Katie Pruitt	
2019	The Secret Lives of Cheerleaders	Katrina Smith	Television film
2019	47 Hours	Lila	
2021	Deadly Excursion: Kidnapped from the Beach	Ellie McCarthy	Television film
2021	Send It!	Sarah	
2021	Red Stone	Emily	
2022	Pursuit	Shannon Breslin	
2022	Presence	Samantha	
2022	What Happened to My Sister?	Callie Thompson	Television film

=== Television ===
Year	Title	Role	Notes
2001	It's a Miracle	Brittany	Episode: "Lost Little Girl"
2003	I'm with Her	Young Alex	Episode: "Alex Misses the Boat"
2007	What's the Word?	Herself	Episodes: "Polite", "Wish Gone Amiss"
2009	True Jackson, VP	Cammy	Episodes: "True Intrigue", "Amanda Hires a Pink"
2009	The Wannabes	Ballet Student	Episode: "The Wannabes Are Gonna Be"
2010	Shake It Up	Destiny	Episode: "Hook It Up"
2011–2013	A.N.T. Farm	Paisley Houndstooth	Recurring role (28 episodes)
2013	Hart of Dixie	Fanny	Episode: "This Kiss"
2014	Suburgatory	Savannah	Episode: "The Ballad of Piggy Duckworth"
2015	From Dusk till Dawn: The Series	Jessica	Episode: "The Best Little Horror House In Texas"
2015	The Inspectors	Jaclyn	Episode: "Final Distraction"
2019	The Act	Hayley	Episode: "Teeth"
2025	The Hunting Wives	Taylor	Co-starring role (7 episodes)

== Awards and nominations ==
Award	Year	Category	Work	Result	Ref.
Young Artist Awards	2012	Best Performance in a TV Series – Recurring Young Actress	A.N.T. Farm	Nominated	
