= Round of Your Life =

- Directed by: Dylan Thomas Ellis
- Written by: Tim Ogletree
- Starring: Evan Hara; Richard T. Jones; Katie Leclerc; Allie DeBerry; Tim Ogletree
- Release date: June 21, 2019
- Running time: 91 minutes
- Country: United States
- Language: English

Round of Your Life is a 2019 American sports film directed by Dylan Thomas Ellis and starring Evan Hara, Richard T. Jones, Katie Leclerc, Allie DeBerry and Tim Ogletree.

== Cast ==
- Boo Arnold as Carl Collins
- Katherine Willis
- Tim Ogletree as Tucker
- Evan Hara as Taylor
- Richard T. Jones as Coach Wilson
- Allie DeBerry as Bailey
- Blair Jackson as Connor
- Katie Leclerc as Minka

== Reception ==
The film has a 60% rating on Rotten Tomatoes. Bill Goodykoontz of The Arizona Republic awarded the film two stars and wrote, "You want to root for it, but it never quite measures up." Kimber Myers of the Los Angeles Times gave the film a positive review and wrote "Director Dylan Thomas Ellis has made a gentle, inoffensive film that preaches as much about the power of prayer as the dangers of texting and driving."
