= River Gallo =

American filmmaker, actor, model, and intersex rights activist

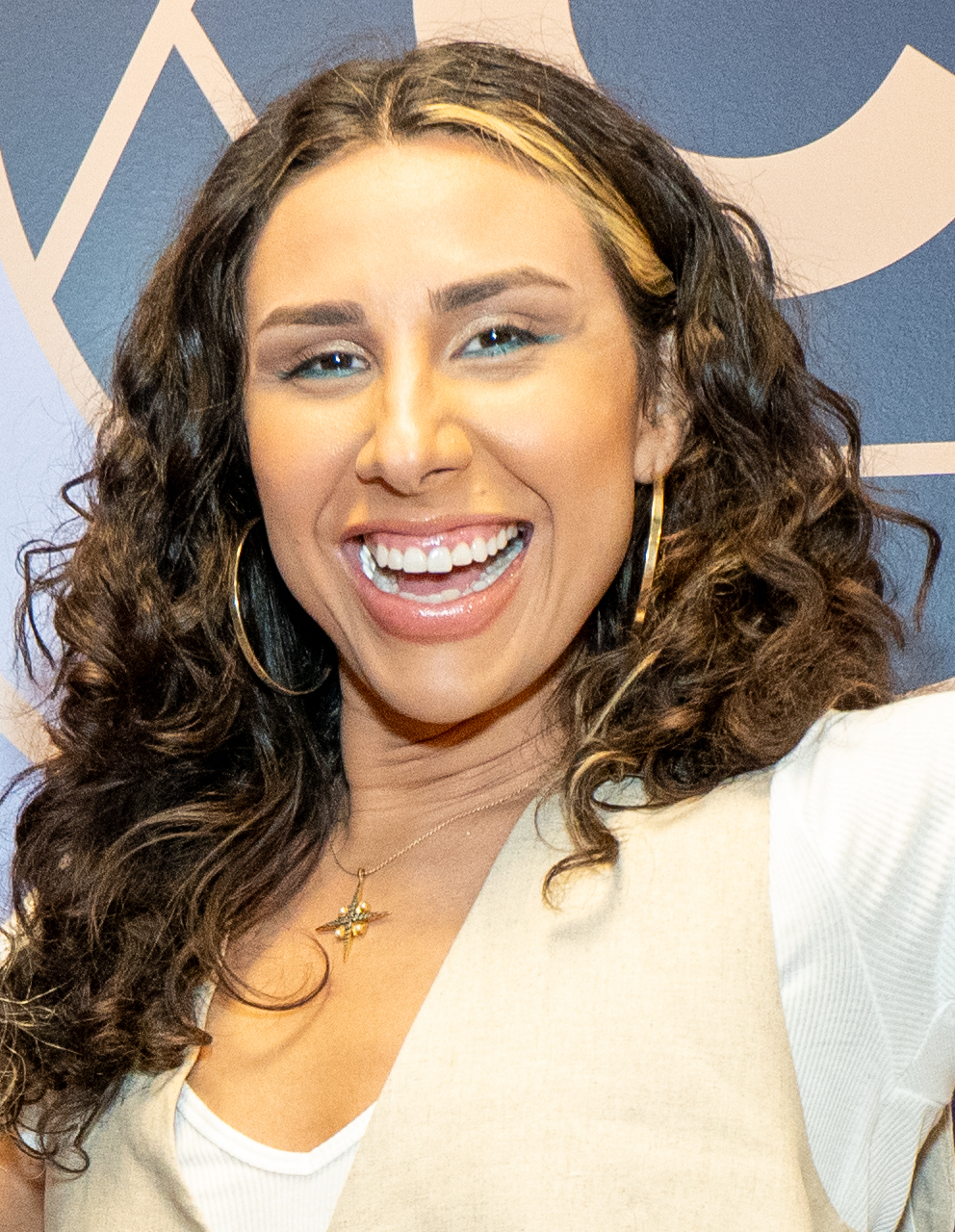
- Gallo in 2023
- Born: New Jersey, U.S.
- Education: New York University Tisch School of the Arts (BA); USC School of Cinematic Arts (MFA)
- Occupations: Filmmaker, actor, screenwriter, model, intersex rights activist
- Employer: Gaptoof Entertainment
- Notable work: Ponyboi

River Gallo is an American filmmaker, actor, screenwriter, model, and intersex rights activist. They wrote, directed, and acted in the 2019 short film Ponyboi, which was the first film to feature an openly intersex actor playing an intersex person. Gallo adapted the screenplay for Ponyboi into a feature-length film by the same name, which premiered at the 2024 Sundance Film Festival. Gallo also played the lead role in the 2024 adaptation.

== Early and personal life ==
Gallo was born in and grew up in New Jersey. Their parents are immigrants from El Salvador. When they turned twelve they learned they had been born without testicles, although the doctor did not tell them they were intersex. The doctor told them they would need to start hormone therapy and have surgery to insert prosthetic testicles so they would "look and feel like a normal man". They have since become outspoken about ending unnecessary cosmetic surgeries performed on children with atypical genitals who are not old enough to give informed consent.

Gallo learned about the term "intersex", and that it applied to them, while writing their master's thesis. Gallo is non-binary, transfem, and queer. As of June 2023, they reside in Los Angeles.

== Career ==
Gallo attended the New York University, where they trained in the Experimental Theatre Wing at the Tisch School of the Arts. After graduating with a bachelor's degree in 2013, they attended the USC School of Cinematic Arts and earned their master's degree.

=== Ponyboi ===
While studying theater, Gallo created a 40-minute-long stage performance art piece that they would later adapt into Ponyboi. For their master's thesis at USC in 2019, they created the Ponyboi short film. The 19-minute-long piece is about an intersex Latinx runaway in New Jersey who works at a laundromat during the day and as a sex worker at night. On Valentine's Day, Ponyboi meets and falls in love with a man and begins to overcome his traumatic past. While writing the film, Gallo discovered the term "intersex" and came to realize it described them. Gallo co-directed the film along with their USC classmate Sadé Clacken Joseph. The film was produced by executive producer Stephen Fry and co-producers Emma Thompson and Seven Graham. The film was screened at festivals including the BFI Flare: London LGBT Film Festival and the Tribeca Film Festival.

Gallo was a fellow in Sundance's Trans Possibilities Intensive in 2021, during which time they worked to develop the Ponyboi film further. Gallo's adapted the screenplay for the Ponyboi short film into a feature-length film by the same name, which premiered at the 2024 Sundance Film Festival. Gallo also played the lead role in the 2024 adaptation, which was directed by Esteban Arango. The crime thriller follows the young intersex sex worker named Ponyboi, who works at a laundromat with his pregnant best friend Angel (Victoria Pedretti). He spends his nights with his secret lover and pimp, and the father of Angel's child, Vinnie (Dylan O'Brien). However, when a drug deal goes bad, he finds himself on the run from the mob. The film was positively reviewed in The Hollywood Reporter, which wrote that Gallo's screenplay "achieves something still rare in an industry unnecessarily confused about inclusion: Ponyboi seamlessly integrates its character's challenges with identity into a propulsive story about a sex worker on the run." Collider wrote that the film was "cinematic gold" that "would be nothing without River Gallo's performance".Variety gave a more critical review, praising Gallo's acting but criticizing the writing as predictable and too reliant on clichés. On the review aggregator website Rotten Tomatoes, 83% of 23 critics' reviews are positive, with an average rating of 7.3/10.

=== Other work ===
Gallo is the founder and CEO of the Gaptoof Entertainment production company.

In 2020, Gallo performed in an episode of the Hulu original teen drama series Love, Victor, which is a spinoff of the 2018 film Love, Simon. Gallo appears in episode 8, "Boys' Trip", as the character Kim, who is one of Simon's several LGBT roommates.

Gallo was profiled along with Alicia Roth Weigel and Sean Saifa Wall in a documentary about intersex people called Every Body, which premiered at the Tribeca Film Festival in 2023.

== Recognition ==
In 2019, Gallo won the GLAAD Rising Star Grant, which they said they planned to use to mentor LGBTQIA+ students in Los Angeles public schools. They were also named in Out magazine's "Most Exciting Queers to Follow on Instagram in 2019" list and Paper's "100 People Taking Over 2019" list. Gallo was named to Out magazine's 2023 "Out100" list.

== Activism ==
Gallo is an intersex rights activist, and has spoken out about issues including unnecessary surgery on intersex children. They have supported California Senate Bill 201, which would ban doctors from performing cosmetic surgeries on children with atypical genitals until they are old enough to give informed consent.

== Filmography ==
=== Film ===
Year	Title	Role	Notes
2023	Every Body	Self	
2024	Ponyboi	Ponyboi	Also writer
2025	Fixed	Frankie	Voice

=== Television ===
Year	Title	Role	Notes
2014	The Heart, She Holler		Episode: "Congroined Hearts"
2020	Love, Victor	Kim	Episode : "Love, Victor"
