= Ponyboi =

2024 American drama film

- Theatrical release poster
- Directed by: Esteban Arango
- Written by: River Gallo
- Produced by: Mark Ankner; River Gallo; Adel "Future" Nur; Trevor Wall
- Starring: River Gallo; Dylan O'Brien; Victoria Pedretti; Murray Bartlett; Indya Moore
- Cinematography: Ed Wu
- Edited by: Hanna Park
- Music by: Cristobal Tapia de Veer
- Production companies: 30KFT; Tideline Entertainment
- Distributed by: Fox Entertainment Studios; Gathr
- Release dates: January 20, 2024 (Sundance); June 27, 2025 (United States)
- Running time: 103 minutes
- Country: United States
- Language: English
- Box office: $29,694

Ponyboi is a 2024 American thriller film directed by Esteban Arango, from a screenplay by River Gallo. It is based upon the 2019 short film of the same name by Gallo. It stars Gallo, Dylan O'Brien, Victoria Pedretti, Murray Bartlett, and Indya Moore.

It had its world premiere at the Sundance Film Festival on January 20, 2024, and was released through Fox Entertainment Studios and Gathr on June 27, 2025.

== Premise ==
On Valentine's Day, in New Jersey, a young intersex sex worker is working at a laundromat with their pregnant best friend, Angel. They spend their nights with Vinnie, their secret lover and pimp who is also the father of Angel's child. However, when a drug deal goes bad, they find themself on the run from the mob.

== Cast ==
- River Gallo as Ponyboi
- Dylan O'Brien as Vinnie
- Murray Bartlett as Bruce
- Victoria Pedretti as Angel
- Indya Moore as Charlie
- Denis Lambert
- Stephen Moscatello
- Aphrodite Armstrong
- Keith William Richards as Two-Tone

== Production ==
In December 2022, it was announced River Gallo, Dylan O'Brien, Victoria Pedretti, and Indya Moore had joined the cast of the film, with Esteban Arango directing from a screenplay by Gallo.

The film was shot at various locations in New Jersey. Principal photography concluded by November 2022.

== Release ==
It had its world premiere at the Sundance Film Festival on January 20, 2024.

== Reception ==
On the review aggregator website Rotten Tomatoes, 82% of 34 critics' reviews are positive, with an average rating of 7.3/10. The film was positively reviewed in The Hollywood Reporter, which wrote that Gallo's screenplay "achieves something still rare in an industry unnecessarily confused about inclusion: Ponyboi seamlessly integrates its character’s challenges with identity into a propulsive story about a sex worker on the run." Collider wrote that the film was "cinematic gold" that "would be nothing without River Gallo's performance". Variety gave a more critical review, praising Gallo's acting but criticizing the writing as predictable and too reliant on clichés.
