= Crabs! =

- Directed by: Pierce Berolzheimer
- Written by: Pierce Berolzheimer
- Produced by: Pierce Berolzheimer; Noah Lang; Evan Buxbaum
- Starring: Dylan Riley Snyder; Bryce Durfee; Allie Jennings; Jessica Morris; Chase Padgett; Robert Craighead
- Edited by: Pierce Berolzheimer; L. Gustavo Cooper
- Music by: Mike Trebilcock
- Production companies: Ojala Productions; Young Gunner Films
- Distributed by: Raven Banner
- Release date: 26 August 2021 (FrightFest)
- Running time: 80 minutes
- Country: United States
- Language: English

Crabs! is a 2021 American comedy horror film directed by Pierce Berolzheimer, starring Dylan Riley Snyder, Bryce Durfee, Allie Jennings, Jessica Morris, Chase Padgett and Robert Craighead. It is the directorial debut of Berolzheimer.

== Plot ==
Following a nuclear accident, a group of horseshoe crabs is transformed into deadly creatures. They invade a tranquil coastal town during Prom night, and it falls to a motley crew of misfits to rescue the day.

== Cast ==
- Dylan Riley Snyder as Phillip McCalister
- Bryce Durfee as Hunter McCalister
- Allie Jennings as Maddy Menrath
- Jessica Morris as Annalise Menrath
- Chase Padgett as Radu
- Robert Craighead as Sheriff Flannegan

== Release ==
Raven Banner acquired the film in September 2015. The film premiered at FrightFest on 26 August 2021.

== Reception ==
Phil Wheat of Nerdly rated the film 4 stars out of 5, calling it "totally stupid but stupid in the most clever, brilliant, FUN (this film is really, REALLY, fun!) way". Martin Unsworth of Starburst rated the film 3 stars out of 5, writing that "If you can get over the offensive stereotypes and take it in the spirit in which it was no doubt made, you could have a lot of fun." Film critic Anton Bitel, writing for VODzilla.com, rated the film 3 stars out of 5, calling it "a mad, monstrous B-movie throwback pitting man (and mecha) against a marine menace". Jacob Davison of iHorror rated the film 3 "eyes" out of 5, calling it a "low-brow creature feature with killer horseshoe crabs, wacky characters, and ample amounts of blood and gore."

Michael Gingold of Rue Morgue wrote a positive review of the film, writing that "For teen and older fans who can get into its goofball spirit and its clear love of animal-attack mayhem, CRABS! is a diverting, no-longer-than-it-has-to-be 80 minutes that will fill the bill for future festival/late-night screenings and alcohol-fueled watch parties." Film critic Kim Newman wrote a positive review of the film. Sean Parker of Horror Obsessive wrote a positive review of the film, writing that "The acting is mostly good, some of the jokes hit gut-busting territory, there are awesome practical effects, and the film’s popping color palette is far better than it should be." Louisa Moore of Screen Zealots wrote a positive review of the film.

Meagan Navarro of Bloody Disgusting rated the film 2.5 out of 5, writing that while the film "doesn’t make a lot of sense, and it doesn’t bother trying", it "leans into its low budget and uses that in its favor. It wants to provide a nonsensical time at the movies, never meant to be taken seriously. It has all the finesse of a sledgehammer, delivering nonstop blunt force humor that will either alienate viewers or reluctantly win them over." Lon Strickland of MovieWeb wrote that the film is "as terrible as it is amazing".
