= Allisyn Snyder =

American actress (born 1996)

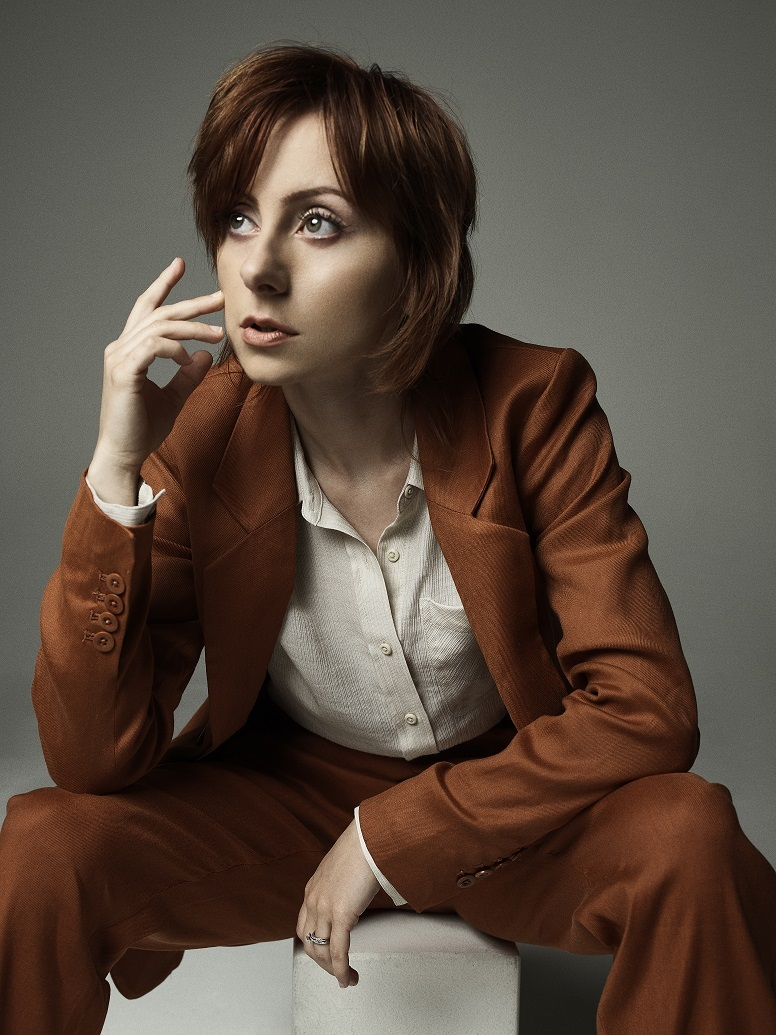
- Snyder in 2021
- Born: Allisyn Ashley Arm; April 25, 1996 (age 30); Glendale, California, U.S.
- Other names: Alissyn Arm; Allisyn Ashley Arm; Allisyn Arm
- Occupations: Actress; writer; artist; director
- Years active: 1998–present
- Spouse: Dylan Riley Snyder (m. 2019)
- Relatives: Travis Kalanick (half-uncle)
- Website: AllisynSnyder.com

Allisyn Ashley Snyder (née Arm; born April 25, 1996) is an American actress, writer, artist, and director. She is known on screen for her main role as Zora Lancaster on Sonny with a Chance and its spin-off So Random! as well as Heather Wilmore on NBC's A.P. Bio. She is the co-owner of Watch The Footage Productions and has been producing since 2016.

== Early life ==
Snyder was born Allisyn Ashley Arm on April 25, 1996, in Glendale, California, to Steven "Steve" and Anjanette "Anji" Kalanick Arm. Her mother is the half-sister of Uber co-founder and former CEO Travis Kalanick. At the age of four, her parents saw her fascination with theater and enrolled her in acting school where she was discovered by Lynne Marks who became her manager.

== Career ==
=== Acting career ===
Snyder appeared in over 60 commercials throughout her childhood. In May 2002, she made her first television appearance on the medical drama series: Strong Medicine. She would go on to make appearances in episodes of Friends, 10-8, Miracles, and Judging Amy.

Snyder also had roles on films such as Meet Dave and King of California opposite Michael Douglas. In 2009, Snyder appeared as Zora in the Disney Channel hit series Sonny with a Chance, and in the spin-off series So Random! in 2011. Snyder also voiced the character Stormy in the Disney Junior series Jake and the Never Land Pirates. Regarding her roles, she told People (magazine), "I watch a lot of SNL skits online. I love Chris Farley and Jim Carrey. I always think, 'What would Jim Carrey do in this scene?' He's a lot of my inspiration for my character (Zora)."

In 2014, Snyder developed a YouTube personality named Astrid Clover. The web series ran for 7 years, with more than 350 episodes.

In 2018, Snyder was cast in NBC's comedy series A.P. Bio in which she plays a mousy but determined high-schooler with a dark side named Heather Wilmore.

=== Film career ===
In 2016, Snyder launched her film career by teaming up with Bryan Morrison and Dylan Riley Snyder to create Watch The Footage Productions. Four of her first six films received distribution with Fun Size Horror.

== Personal life ==
Snyder is also an artist and had her first gallery showing at 15 years old. She enjoys roller derby and studies trapeze with her younger sister Josie. On Drew C. Ryan's Reel Geek Girls series, Allisyn shared her extensive collection of Fight Club memorabilia, which she considers her personal obsession. Snyder married Dylan Riley Snyder in 2019, eight years after the two met as teenagers on Disney Channel when Allisyn starred on Sonny With A Chance and Dylan starred on Kickin' It. Their shows were shot on production lots across from each other.

== Filmography ==
=== Film ===
Year	Title	Role	Notes
1998	The Cask of Amontillado	Montressor's Daughter	
2004	Eulogy	Collin's Daughter	
2007	King of California	Miranda (age 9)	
2007	Greetings from Earth	Little girl	
2007	Mr. Woodcock	Scout Girl	
2008	Meet Dave	Nerdy Girl	
2014	Aimy in a Cage	Aimy Micry	

=== Television ===
Year	Title	Role	Notes
2002	Strong Medicine	Wendy Withers	Episode: "Outcomes"
2003	Miracles	Amelia Wye	Episode: "Little Miss Lost"
2003	Friends	Leslie Buffay	Episode: "The One Where Ross Is Fine"
2003	Judging Amy	Molly Maddox	Episode: "Ex Parte of Five"
2003	10-8: Officers on Duty	Little Wailing Girl	Episode: "Late for School"
2005	Man of the House	Charlotte Tulaire	
2005	Still Standing	Ella	Episode: "Still Holding"
2005	Inconceivable	Lexie	Episode: "To Surrogate, with Love"
2006–2007	Dive Olly Dive!	Beth	Main role (Season 1)
2006–2007	Vanished	Violet	Episode: "Warm Springs"
2007	Back to You	Kid #1	Episode: "Gracie's Bully"
2008	Disney Channel's Totally New Year	Player	Disney Channel event
2009	Disney Channel's Totally New Year 2009	Herself	Disney Channel event
2009–2011	Sonny with a Chance	Zora Lancaster	Main role, Disney Channel Original Series
2011–2012	So Random!	Zora Lancaster	Main role, Disney Channel Original Series
2012–2013	Jake and the Never Land Pirates	Stormy	Voice, recurring role
2013	Body of Proof	Celeste	Episode: "Committed"
2013–2015	AwesomenessTV	Various Characters	2 episodes
2015	I Didn't Do It	Shelley	Episode: "Drum Beats, Heart Beats"
2015	Betch: A Sketch Show	AAA	Episode: "A Drunk Sketch Show"
2016	Ozark Sharks	Molly Kaye	Television film
2018	No, That's Okay. I'm Good	Herself	Episode: "Allisyn Ashley Arm & Matthew Scott Montgomery"
2018	Noches con Platanito	Herself	Episode: "Jeff Dye/Allisyn Ashley Arm/Nick Peine/Zulay Henao/Carlos Sanchez/Alta Consigna"
2018–2021	A.P. Bio	Heather	Recurring role
2024	That Girl Lay Lay	Jilly Donuts	Episode: "School of Rap"

=== Filmmaking ===
Year	Title	Director	Writer	Producer	Notes	Ref.
2023	Howdy, Neighbor!	Yes	No	Yes		
2019	Room 556	No	Yes	No	Winner of Best Horror at 2019 Hollywood Just4Shorts and Best Screenplay at the 2019 One-Reeler Short Film Competition.	
2019	Nasty Habits	Yes	Yes	Yes	Winner of Best Thriller Short and Best Female Director at 2019 Independent Short Awards.	
2016	Strangers	Yes	Yes	Yes		

=== Music video ===
Year	Artist	Title
2008	Demi Lovato	"La La Land"
