= Fixed (film) =

2025 film by Genndy Tartakovsky

- Streaming release poster
- Directed by: Genndy Tartakovsky
- Screenplay by: Genndy Tartakovsky; Jon Vitti
- Story by: Steve Greenberg; Rich Lufrano; Genndy Tartakovsky; Jon Vitti
- Produced by: Michelle Murdocca
- Starring: Adam DeVine; Idris Elba; Kathryn Hahn; Fred Armisen; Beck Bennett; Bobby Moynihan; Michelle Buteau; River Gallo
- Edited by: Mark Yeager
- Music by: Tyler Bates; Joanne Higginbottom
- Production company: Sony Pictures Animation
- Distributed by: Netflix
- Release dates: June 11, 2025 (Annecy); August 13, 2025 (Netflix)
- Running time: 85 minutes
- Country: United States
- Language: English
- Budget: ~$30 million

Fixed is a 2025 American adult animated sex comedy film directed by Genndy Tartakovsky and written by Tartakovsky and Jon Vitti. Produced by Sony Pictures Animation for Netflix, it is the former's first traditionally animated film. The film features the voices of Adam DeVine, Idris Elba, Kathryn Hahn, Fred Armisen, Beck Bennett, Bobby Moynihan, Michelle Buteau, and River Gallo. The film revolves around a dog named Bull who sets out to win the heart of his crush named Honey while also dealing with the fact that he is going to be neutered.

The film was first conceived in 2009, and development began in 2018. The cast was announced in June 2023. Warner Bros. Pictures was originally set to distribute the film, but had dropped the film by August 2024 as part of cost-saving measures by Warner Bros. Discovery, canceling its theatrical release. Netflix later acquired the distribution rights to the film, and it had its world premiere on June 11, 2025, at the 2025 Annecy International Animation Film Festival, before releasing on Netflix on August 13 to mixed reviews from critics.

== Plot ==
Bull is a two year old Staffordshire Bull Terrier mutt from Chicago, who frequently humps anything that piques his interest to vent his perverse sexual instincts. He is friends a British-accented named boxer Rocco, a wannabe-influencer dachshund naned Fetch, and a dim-witted, masochistic beagle named Lucky, all of whom except for Bull have been neutered, which makes them a target of ridicule from the haughty, self-absorbed Borzoi show dog Sterling. Bull also harbors a crush on his neighbor, a female show dog Borzoi named Honey, but is hesitant to reveal his true feelings for her.

One day, Bull's owners comfort him with enrichment items. But when Bull gets to the Kool-Aid-flavored toilet water, he soon realizes that this means he is due to be neutered the following morning, as Great Dane Luther, had a similar pre-neutered experience. Bull bemoans his experience, alienates his friends, and leaves his home in order to save himself from being sterilized.

However, he soon reconsiders when he is accosted by a large clowder of alley cats, but is rescued by his friends, who came searching for him when he ran away from his home. Reconciling, Bull and his friends barely manage to escape the cats' territory. As Bull decides to return home and face his impending neutering, Rocco convinces him to have one last wild night on the town to make sure his last night of being intact will be one to remember.

The foursome get into various shenanigans, such as infiltrating a dog show where Honey is competing in alongside Sterling. Bull finally musters the courage to share his attraction to her with her until she and Sterling win, causing him to sadly leave. The foursome then visit "The Humphouse" (a dog-friendly version of a strip club), where Lucky meets and falls for the intersex Dobermann bouncer Frankie. Bull meets Molasses, a seductive red Borzoi who reminds him of Honey. As Molasses seduces Bull to mate with her, Honey, who abandoned the dog show for Bull, stumbles upon the scene and angrily confronts him.

Bull, Honey and the others are captured by animal control and taken to the dog pound, where Honey is eventually released after her owners are informed of her whereabouts via a chip in her neck. Realizing that Honey and Sterling will breed due to them winning the dog show, Bull and his friends escape the pound and venture to Bull's house, though Lucky deviates from the group to reunite with Frankie. Bull manages to physically intervene between Honey and Sterling as they're about to breed. However, an oblivious Sterling unknowingly sodomizes Bull, believing to be breeding with Honey. Bull confesses his feelings to Honey, apologizes to her and then leaves. Later that evening, after Bull reunites with his family, Honey lures him into a backyard treehouse, where she confesses her love for him and the pair then mate.

Inevitably, Bull is neutered, but not before he becomes the father of his and Honey's litter of thirteen puppies three months later. Meanwhile, Sterling discovers that he will also be neutered, much to his horror as Luther mocks him. Later on, Honey and her own pack of friends visit The Humphouse to watch a grizzly bear twerk, to the delight of the audience and to Bull, Rocco, Fetch and Lucky's astonishment.

== Voice cast ==
- Adam DeVine as Bull, a quick-witted blue mutt who learns that he is going to be neutered in the morning
- Idris Elba as Rocco, a self-assured British-accented boxer and Bull's best friend
- Kathryn Hahn as Honey, a Borzoi show dog and Bull's next-door crush
- Fred Armisen as Fetch, a wannabe influencer dachshund
- Beck Bennett as Sterling, a self-absorbed Borzoi show dog and Bull's love rival
- Bobby Moynihan as Lucky, a nervous and goofy beagle
- River Gallo as Frankie, an intersex dobermann bouncer and Lucky's lover
- Michelle Buteau as Molasses, a seductive Borzoi
- Grey DeLisle as Nana, the grandmother of Bull's human family
- Aaron LaPlante as Luther, a hysterical black Great Dane that was previously neutered
- Scott Weil as Alex, the father of Bull's human family
- Julie Nathanson as Julia, the mother of Bull's human family
- Michelle Ruff as Emma, the daughter of Bull's human family
- Kari Wahlgren as Honey's Mom
- Sean Chiplock as Ol' Spice, one of Bull's testicles
- Daran Norris as Napoleon, one of Bull's testicles

Additional voices by Frank Welker, Jon Bailey, Eric Bauza, Gregg Berger, Grey DeLisle, Libby Thomas Dickey, Todd Haberkorn, Brian Hull, Josh Keaton, Craig Kellman, Kat Khavari, Lex Lang, Aaron LaPlante, Mona Marshall, Vanessa Marshall, Julie Nathanson, Ben Pronsky, Lashana Rodriguez, Michelle Ruff, Melissa Sturm, Genndy Tartakovsky, Fred Tatasciore, Frank Todaro, Amanda Troop, Kari Wahlgren, Scott Whyte, Debra Wilson, and Michael-Leon Wooley.

== Production ==
=== Development and writing ===
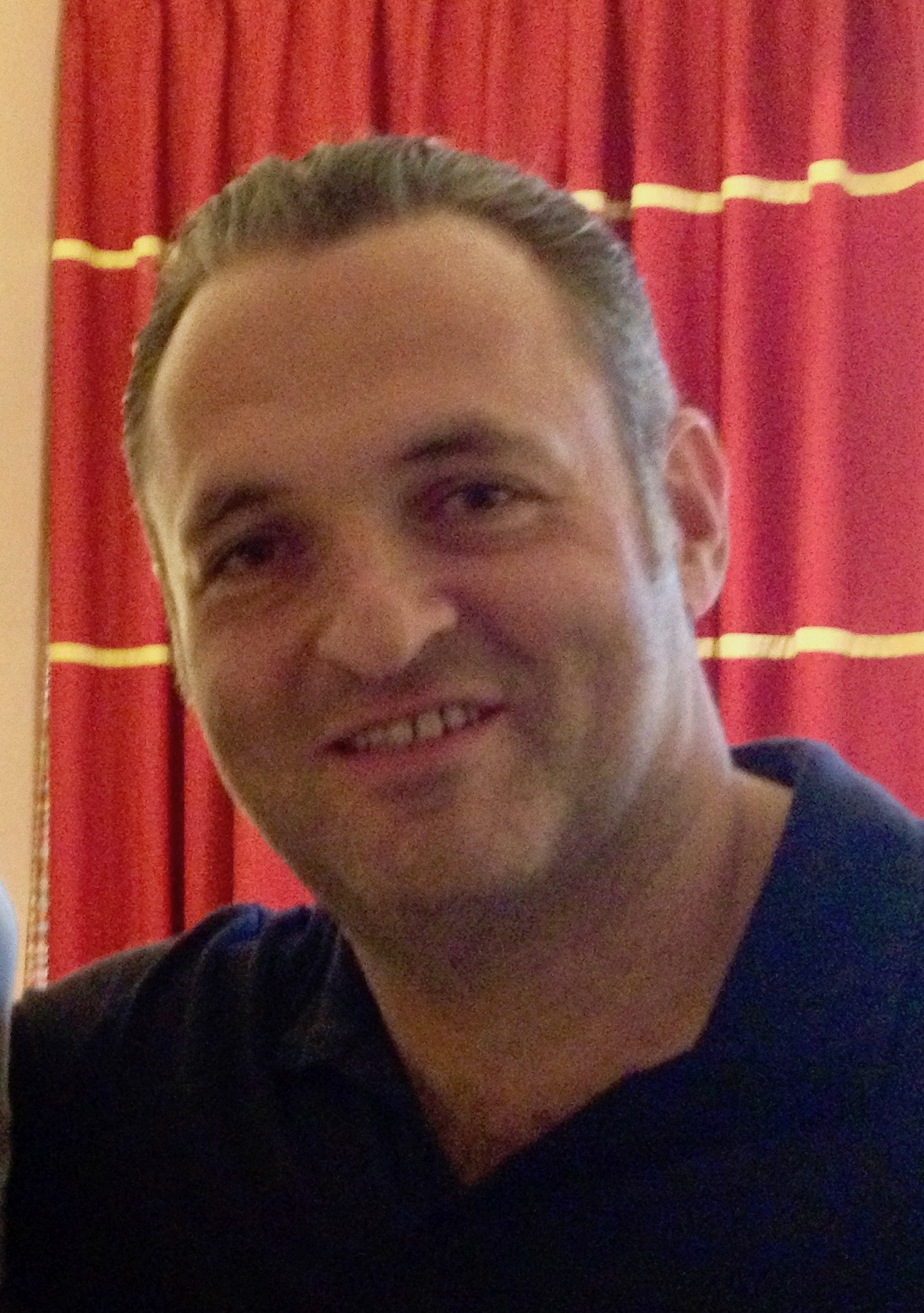
Director and writer Genndy Tartakovsky in 2012.

According to Genndy Tartakovsky, the film was first conceived in 2009, as an animal road-trip film under the title Buds, with Tartakovsky wanting to capture the dynamic of his friend group. The film originally consisted of different types of animals, but after an executive suggested that it needed a stronger hook, Tartakovsky asked "What if one of them is a dog and he realizes he's going to get neutered in the morning?". The film was later titled The Shift before finally becoming Fixed.

On July 25, 2018, Deadline Hollywood reported that Tartakovsky was set to write and direct the film, with Michelle Murdocca producing it. Sony Pictures Animation was set to produce it, marking the studio's first R-rated film. Tartakovsky previously worked on the Hotel Transylvania films for the studio. More details were revealed about the film in June 2019 at the Annecy International Animation Film Festival; Tartakovsky stated, "it's really funny and heartwarming, it's not all about balls, we're trying to make it a character comedy". In July 2022, he stated that despite being a Sony Pictures Animation production, the film would be released through New Line Cinema. He reaffirmed the film's focus on character-based comedy in December 2022, saying that it is what makes the film "much more unique and stand out". In June 2023, Tartakovsky stated that the "camaraderie" between the characters was inspired by Judd Apatow films like The 40-Year-Old Virgin (2005) and Knocked Up (2007).

Speaking about the film with Polygon in 2025, Tartakovsky described Bull having "kind of a false sense of security about his balls, like Samson and his hair", with his friends having been neutered and "just normal".

=== Casting ===
Aaron LaPlante, who previously starred in Tartakovsky's Primal TV series, was revealed to have a role in the film in September 2022. On June 13, 2023, Adam DeVine, Idris Elba, Kathryn Hahn, Fred Armisen, Bobby Moynihan, Beck Bennett, River Gallo, and Michelle Buteau, were announced to star in the film at the Annecy International Animated Film Festival. When Hahn came onto the film, according to Murdocca, she did not want to be "the sweet girl in the background who doesn't have any depth to her", aiming for her character to be raunchier.

=== Animation and design ===
The animation was done by Renegade Animation and the Brazilian studio Lightstar Studios. Scott Wills served as art director, having previously worked with Tartakovsky on Samurai Jack and Primal. Production began by July 2022, and was eyeing completion for September 2023 when the cast was announced. While the film was originally intended by Tartakovsky to be made through hand-drawn animation, he later considered using computer animation to "better sell the film". He ultimately decided to keep the film's hand-drawn animation, making it the first hand-drawn film to be produced by Sony Pictures Animation, due to the hand-drawn aesthetic working better for the film's plot.

Tartakovsky wanted the animation to be reminiscent of Walt Disney Animation Studios' Lady and the Tramp (1955) and One Hundred and One Dalmatians (1961), while also drawing inspiration from the works of Tex Avery and Chuck Jones' Looney Tunes shorts, particularly due to their emphasis on expressive animation. However, the film became more cartoony. Tartakovsky did have to soften the animation for the genitals, however, coloring the anuses "a bit more subtly". The film was completed in September 2023.

=== Music ===
Tyler Bates and Joanne Higginbottom, who previously collaborated with Tartakovsky, composed the score, which was released on digital platforms on August 13, 2025.

Track listing
No.	Title	Length
1.	"Get Our Freak On"	0:55
2.	"Adora Bull"	1:46
3.	"Food Rain"	0:45
4.	"You’re Eating Cat Shet!"	1:22
5.	"Stop Humping Nana!"	1:22
6.	"My Sweet Sweet Honey"	1:17
7.	"Gotta bee!"	0:25
8.	"Inbred for Generations"	1:44
9.	"Wiggly Field"	0:33
10.	"My BasketBalls!"	1:31
11.	"Farming Cats"	1:26
12.	"BasketBall-less Zombie"	2:02
13.	"Welcome, Twitches (feat. Lola Colette)"	2:04
14.	"I Am a Wild Farting Wolf"	1:14
15.	"Audio Symphonic Dick dastardly-Tation"	2:02
16.	"Kill the Squirrel!"	1:34
17.	"Nose Bleeder"	0:53
18.	"Just a Dog"	1:35
19.	"Hump House Raid"	0:47
20.	"Get You Some Honey"	0:44
21.	"Karma's a Twitch"	0:27
Total length:		26:28

== Release ==
Fixed had its world premiere on June 11, 2025, at the 2025 Annecy International Animation Film Festival. It was released both on Netflix and in select theaters on August 13, 2025.

It was originally scheduled to be theatrically released on an undetermined date by Warner Bros. Pictures under their New Line Cinema banner. Animator Jaison Roberto Carvalho, who worked on the film, confirmed on Instagram that the film would be released in 2023. Speaking about the film on the podcast This Is Important on May 7, 2024, Devine stated the film would be released in 2025, while in a June 2024 interview with Animation Magazine, Tartakovsky said that the release situation was being figured out.

On August 9, 2024, it was reported that Warner Bros. and New Line would no longer release the film as part of cost-saving measures by parent company Warner Bros. Discovery. The distribution rights returned to Sony Pictures Animation, with the film being shopped to other studios and streamers. First reported by Matthew Belloni of Puck News, the news was a surprising announcement given Tartakovsky's history with WBD's Cartoon Network and Adult Swim. Netflix was considered as one of the potential options where Fixed could end up given Sony Pictures Animation's previous collaborations with the company, while Belloni suggested that if negotiations are unsuccessful, the film could be canceled and written off in a similar manner to Batgirl and the then-shelved Coyote vs. Acme.

On October 1, 2024, while attending the SCAD's AnimationFest to be honored with the Award for Excellence, Tartakovsky reassured Collider's Steve Weintraub that Fixed was completed and "is not dead by any means nor shelved, just waiting to find a distributor he and Sony are trying to get". In an exclusive article from TheWrap, it was revealed that the film was dropped in 2023, after it was completed the same year. In January 2024, Netflix seemed uninterested, as the streaming service's Animation Film team is focused on family-oriented films. Tartakovsky offered to rent out a theater for three months and pay for it. In early 2025, Netflix's Animation Series team, led by John Derderian (who oversees adult animation for the streamer), became involved, and within a few weeks, the film was sold to the streamer. The film had an advance screening and a Q/A on August 2, 2025, at the Paris Theater in New York City, and closed the 29th Fantasia International Film Festival on August 3, 2025.

== Reception ==
On the review aggregator website Rotten Tomatoes, 56% of 62 critics' reviews are positive, with an average rating of 5.3/10. The website's consensus reads: "Animation legend Genndy Tartakovsky cuts a little too loose with Fixed, an aggressively crude cartoon that might just scratch the itch for those who like their comedies frisky." Metacritic, which uses a weighted average, assigned the film a score of 51 out of 100, based on 12 critics, indicating "mixed or average" reviews.

Ryan Gaur of Discussing Film gave the film a 3/5 star rating, writing, "Genndy Tartakovsky has provided some of the highest highs in Western animation. Unfortunately, Fixed isn't one of them. The foul humor might work for some viewers on the cusp of adulthood, but it falls into a trap of adult animation where it mistakes 'adult' for 'gross'. Nonetheless, there's enough here to prove that Tartakovsky is still a master, beautiful 2D animation that I pray he's given another chance to flex his muscles in. Not his best, yet I'm glad he gave it a try." Peter Debruge of Variety gave a positive review, stating that "the film proves impressively grown-up about how far Bull must go to atone for his behavior".

=== Accolades ===
The film was nominated for Best Character Design – Feature at the 53rd Annie Awards, but lost to KPop Demon Hunters, another film Sony Pictures Animation made.

Award	Date of ceremony	Category	Recipient	Result	Ref.
Annie Awards	February 21, 2026	Best Character Design – Feature	Craig Kellman	Nominated	
