= Natasha Hall =

Canadian actress, writer and director (born 1991)

- Born: August 5, 1991 (age 35); Vancouver, British Columbia, Canada
- Occupations: Actress; writer; director
- Years active: 2007-present
- Spouse: Leo Howard (m. 2024)

Natasha Hall (born August 5, 1991) is a Canadian actress, writer, and director. She is best known for her recurring role as Yvette in the Netflix comedy-drama series The Kominsky Method (2018–2021) and for her role as Madison in the 2018 action-comedy film Game Night.

Born in Vancouver, British Columbia, Hall began her career with guest appearances on television series such as Everybody Hates Chris and 90210. Her television credits have since expanded to include roles in S.W.A.T., Mom, and SEAL Team. In 2024, she briefly portrayed Sloan Petersen-Brady on the long-running soap opera Days of Our Lives. Outside of her acting career, she has also written and directed short films, including The Audition and Her Time.

== Early life and education ==
Natasha Hall was born on August 5, 1991, in Vancouver, British Columbia, Canada. She grew up with a strong interest in performing arts and eventually moved to Los Angeles to pursue a professional acting career. Hall attended university and graduated with a degree in Theatre. She furthered her professional training at Playhouse West in Los Angeles, where she was a long-time student of acting teacher Holly Gagnier.

== Career ==
=== 2009–2017: Early roles and television debut ===
Hall began her professional acting career in 2009 with a television debut in the comedy series Everybody Hates Chris. In the following years, she appeared in various guest-starring roles on network television, including the teen drama 90210 (2012) and the police procedural Castle (2014). Her early film work primarily consisted of independent productions, including the 2014 action film Zulu Six and Navy SEALS v Demons (2017). During this period, she also wrote and directed the short films Her Time (2010) and The Audition (2012).

=== 2018–2022: Breakout and The Kominsky Method ===
Hall experienced a significant career breakout in 2018 when she was cast as Madison in the action-comedy film Game Night. That same year, she began a recurring role as Yvette in the Netflix comedy-drama series The Kominsky Method, a part she played through the series' conclusion in 2021. Her television work continued with appearances in several high-profile series, including S.W.A.T. (2018), Mom (2020–2021), and SEAL Team (2021). In 2022, she appeared as Virginia in the comedy A Little White Lie.

=== 2024–present: Days of Our Lives and current projects ===
In 2024, Hall joined the cast of the daytime soap opera Days of Our Lives, temporarily portraying the role of Sloan Petersen-Brady. This period also included a guest appearance in CSI: Vegas as Valerie Hammond. Later that year, she was cast as Diana in the CBS comedy spin-off series Georgie & Mandy's First Marriage.

== Other ventures ==
=== Brand work ===
In addition to her acting career, Hall has been active as a content creator and brand collaborator. She maintains a significant presence on social media platforms, including Instagram and TikTok, where she shares content focused on fashion, lifestyle, and comedic sketches.

=== Endorsements ===
Hall has also been involved in the wellness and skincare industries. She has served as a brand representative for companies such as Arbonne, promoting plant-based nutrition and skincare products.

=== Activism and philanthropy ===
Outside of her acting career, Hall is an advocate for animal welfare and frequently shares content regarding pet adoption and rescue organizations. She is also a practitioner of the Meisner technique, which she has studied extensively through her training at Playhouse West.

=== Screenwriting and directing ===
Furthermore, her background in the entertainment industry has led to involvement in production-related roles; she is credited with executive producing short films such as Broken: A Choice (2018) and Children's Therapy (2015).

== Personal life ==
=== Relationships and family ===
Hall resides in Los Angeles, California. In July 2023, she became engaged to actor Leo Howard. The couple married on September 9, 2024, in a ceremony held in Savannah, Georgia.

== Filmography ==
=== Film ===
Year	Title	Role	Notes	Ref.
2010	Her Time	Nataly Townsend	Short film; also writer	
2012	The Audition	Herself (fictionalised)	Also director and writer	
2013	On The Red Line	Genevieve	Short film	
2014	Zulu Six	Tatiana Jikova		
2015	Fun Size Horror: Volume One:	Girl 1	Segment: Somebody's Watching You	
2017	Navy SEALS v Demons	Agent Ivanova		
2018	Game Night	Madison		
2020	4/20	Emily		
2022	The Disappearance of Toby Blackwood	Courtney		
2022	A Little White Lie	Virginia		

=== Television ===
Year	Title	Role	Notes	Ref.
2007-2009	Everybody Hates Chris	Nadya/Russian Girl	2 episodes	
2004-2009	Entourage	Young Vince Fan/Kimberly	2 episodes	
2010	Glory Daze	Kelly	Episode: ''Hungry Like Teen Wolf''	
2012	90210	Cassandra	Episode: ''99 Problems''	
2013	Body of Proof	Oksana Svetlova	Episode: ''Fallen Angel''	
2014	Castle	Madison Beaumont	Episode: ''Smells Like Teen Spirit''	
2014	Faking It	Sandy	Episode: ''You Can't Handle Truth Or Dare''	
2017	NCIS: Los Angeles	Heather	Episode: ''Se Murio El Payaso''	
2018	S.W.A.T	Keri	Episode: ''Ghosts''	
2018	The Thundermans	Galexia	Episode: ''The Thunder Games''	
2020-2021	Mom	Shawn	2 episodes	
2021	SEAL Team	Lt. Cmdr. Williams	2 episodes	
2021	The Kominsky Method	Yvette	3 episodes	
2023	Bookie	Yvette	Episode: ''The Super Bowl: God's Gift To Bookies''	
2024	Days of Our Lives	Sloan Peterson-Brady	3 episodes	
2024	CSI: Vegas	Valerie Hammond	2 episodes	
2025	George & Mandy's First Marriage	Diana	Episode: ''Working for the Enemy''	
