= Blast Beat (film) =

American film

- Film poster
- Directed by: Esteban Arango
- Written by: Erick Castrillon; Esteban Arango
- Produced by: Charles D. King; Poppy Hanks; Erick Castrillon
- Starring: Moisés Arias; Mateo Arias; Daniel Dae Kim; Kali Uchis; Diane Guerrero; Wilmer Valderrama
- Cinematography: Ed Wu
- Edited by: Alex Blatt
- Music by: David Murillo R.
- Distributed by: Vertical Entertainment
- Release dates: January 26, 2020 (Sundance); May 21, 2021 (United States)
- Running time: 105 minutes
- Country: United States
- Languages: English; Spanish

Blast Beat is a 2020 American coming-of-age drama film, starring Mateo and Moisés Arias. It is about two Colombian brothers in the US in 2000, written by Erick Castrillon and Esteban Arango and directed by Arango. It runs for 105 minutes and was acquired by Sony Pictures for distribution. It is in English and Spanish with English subtitles. There is a lot of "metal culture" and dancing in the film. It competed in the Sundance Dramatic Competition. It premiered on January 26, 2020, at the 2020 Sundance Film Festival and was digitally released on May 21, 2021, by Vertical Entertainment.

== Cast ==
- Moisés Arias as Mateo Andres
- Mateo Arias as Carly Andres
- Daniel Dae Kim as Dr. Michael Onitsuka
- Kali Uchis as Mafe
- Diane Guerrero as Nelly Andres
- Wilmer Valderrama as Ernesto Andres
- Andrene Ward-Hammond as Ms. Johnson
