= Aimy in a Cage =

- Directed by: Hooroo Jackson
- Written by: Hooroo Jackson
- Based on: Aimy Micry by Hooroo Jackson
- Produced by: Hooroo Jackson
- Starring: Crispin Glover; Allisyn Ashley Arm; Paz de la Huerta; Terry Moore
- Cinematography: Daphne Qin Wu
- Music by: Joanna Wang; Sasha Smith; Neil Struble; Nick Cunningham
- Production company: Ankaboot Productions
- Release date: September 8, 2015 (Portland)
- Running time: 69 minutes
- Country: United States
- Language: English

Aimy in a Cage is a 2015 American fantasy film written, directed, and produced by Hooroo Jackson, based on Jackson's graphic novel Aimy Micry. The film stars Allisyn Ashley Arm as Aimy, with Crispin Glover, Terry Moore, and Paz de la Huerta in supporting roles. It premiered at the Portland Film Festival on September 8, 2015 before receiving a digital and physical release on January 8, 2016.

== Premise ==
Aimy is a young teenager living in a world where a plague is slowly spreading throughout the world. Any teenagers that rebel against the system are given Wolworth Surgery, which changes them into controllable model citizens. The film takes place entirely within the family's apartment, while they attempt to civilize Aimy in an escalating cat and mouse battle, and the world ends around them.

== Cast ==
- Allisyn Ashley Arm as Aimy Micry
- Crispin Glover as Claude Bohringer
- Paz de la Huerta as Caroline
- Terry Moore as Grandma Micry
- Michael William Hunter as Steve
- Theodore Bouloukos as Gruzzlebird Micry
- Sara Murphy as Kelly Moss
- Frank Mosley as News Anchor
- Rick Montgomery Jr. as Commander Lopchocks
- Gabby Tary as Grandma Moss
- Maria Deasy as Jackie Moss
- Sam Quartin as Dr. Issie
- Nicholas Goroff as HAZMAT Tech
- David Croley Broyles as HAZMAT Tech

== Production ==
The film is adapted from a graphic novel by Jackson. To finance it, Jackson sold off most of his possessions in 2012 and invested in Bitcoin, making it the first Bitcoin financed feature film in history, at the total budget of $500,000. Shooting took place in Boston, Massachusetts.

== Release ==
Aimy in a Cage premiered at the Portland Film Festival in September 2015 where it was awarded the Director's Prize winner. It was released to video on demand and on DVD on January 8, 2016.

== Reception ==
Rotten Tomatoes reports that 60% of five surveyed critics gave the film a positive review. Andrew L. Urban of Urban Cinefile wrote, "It is an idiosyncratic, unique and brave film; while Jackson may draw inspiration from Terry Gilliam, Ken Russell, and David Lynch, he copies none of them." John Noonan of Filmink rated it 15/20 and called it "a Lynchian neon fairy-tale" about sexism and mental health. Elias Savada of Film International wrote, "Jackson shows incredible control over the bedazzling micro-budget production as a first time feature director." Courtney Button of Starburst rated it 1/10 stars and wrote, "Aimy in a Cage is an annoying frenzy of a film that will push your patience further than any film should."
