= Every Body =

2023 documentary by Julie Cohen

- Theatrical release poster
- Directed by: Julie Cohen
- Produced by: Tommy Nguyen; Molly O'Brien
- Starring: Sean Saifa Wall; Alicia Roth Weigel; River Gallo
- Cinematography: Kate Phelan; Leah Anova
- Edited by: Kelly Kendrick
- Music by: Amanda Yamate
- Production company: NBC News Studios
- Distributed by: Focus Features
- Release dates: June 11, 2023 (Tribeca); June 30, 2023 (United States)
- Running time: 92 minutes
- Country: United States
- Language: English
- Box office: $276,895

Every Body is a 2023 American documentary film directed by Julie Cohen and produced by NBC News Studios. It features Sean Saifa Wall, Alicia Roth Weigel and River Gallo. The film premiered at the Tribeca Festival on June 11, 2023, and was released by Focus Features in the United States on June 30, 2023. It received positive reviews.

== Synopsis ==
NPR wrote that the film, "uncovers the misconceptions around intersex people and the mistreatment they've faced". The definition of intersex is a person who looks to be one gender but has subtle biological characteristics of the other, and is neither 100% male or 100% female. This condition is from birth. Alicia, for example, looks very much like a young blue eyed blonde girl. She has a vagina, but beneath it are not a uterus and ovaries, but internal testicles, and her chromosomes are XY. All three subjects are chronicled, and they describe the painful and unnecessary surgical procedures to remove what made them intersex. (Alicia's testicles were removed at a very young age.) Alicia decides to go public with her condition in order to speak out against a "Bathroom Bill" that was making its way through the Texas state legislature, despite warnings that this will make dating for her much more difficult. She succeeds in scuttling the bathroom bill. She then leads many protests to end unnecessary intersex surgery, and identical protests are shown in various American cities. The film ends with a celebration. All three subjects, plus all the principal players in the film - director, producer, etc. - all happily dance one by one before the camera with their names and pronouns displayed.

== Release ==
Every Body premiered at the Tribeca Festival on June 11, 2023. It had a limited theatrical release in the United States by Focus Features on June 30, 2023. The film was released on digital platforms on July 18, 2023. It was released in the United Kingdom by Dogwoof on December 15, 2023.

In the United States and Canada, the film opened in 225 theaters and made $150,030 its opening weekend. It went on to gross a total of $273,860.

== Critical reception ==
On the review aggregator website Rotten Tomatoes, 98% of 44 critics' reviews are positive, with an average rating of 8.1/10. The website's consensus reads: "An illuminating documentary that dispels misinformation and creates an informative space for the intersex community to reach Every Body through the trials and tribulations of gender expression and life." Metacritic, which uses a weighted average, assigned the film a score of 77 out of 100, based on 17 critics, indicating "generally favorable" reviews.

Matt Zoller Seitz of RogerEbert.com described the film as "a moving, fascinating look at a too-often-ignored subset of the world's population, filled with empathy and understanding but also a cool, analytical anger about what history has put them through". Lovia Gyarkye from The Hollywood Reporter called the film "engaging and informative" and ended her review with, "The film leaves you with the sense that, with greater awareness and collective action, the future for the intersex community can be powerful and bright".

Teo Bugbee writing for The New York Times gave a positive review, saying: "The film benefits from its choice of subjects, as Wall, Gallo and Weigel are all endearing and deeply informed. Their candor animates the unimaginative talking head interview footage from the director Julie Cohen (RBG). But beyond casting, Cohen's best directorial choice is to show examples from the history of intersex medical care. Peter Debruge of Variety wrote, "Intersex identity is subject enough for one film, and this one covers an astonishing amount of ground in 92 minutes' time".
