= A Haunting in Cawdor =

- Film poster
- Directed by: Phil Wurtzel
- Written by: Phil Wurtzel
- Produced by: Lolly Howe; Larry A. Lee; Phil Wurtzel
- Starring: Cary Elwes
- Cinematography: Stephen Smith
- Edited by: Thomas Sabinsky
- Music by: Todd Maki
- Production company: Friel Films
- Distributed by: Uncork'd Entertainment
- Release dates: October 9, 2015 (United Kingdom); March 11, 2016 (United States)
- Running time: 102 minutes
- Country: United States
- Language: English

A Haunting in Cawdor is a 2015 American horror thriller film written and directed by Phil Wurtzel and starring Cary Elwes.

== Cast ==
- Cary Elwes as Lawrence O'Neil
- Shelby Young as Vivian Miller
- Michael Welch as Roddy
- Allie DeBerry as Jeanette Welles
- Charlie King as Charles Kosack
- Bethany Edlund as Tina
- Julie Grisham as Mackenzie
- Samantha Rickard as Lisa
- Anna Bradley as Terri Welles
- Philip David Black as Brian
- Patrick Hunter as Lance
- Jamey Grisham as Michael Cross
- Michael Rolando as Gary Baines
- Jordan Moody as Neil Stams
- Penelope Alex Ragotzy as Tess
- Patrick Floch as Dr. Peter Lazarus
- Scott T. Whitesell as Frank Seals
- Bob Stuart as P.O. Mullen

== Reception ==
The film has a 14% approval rating on Rotten Tomatoes, based on seven reviews with an average score of 2.5/10.
