= Mamaboy =

- Theatrical release poster
- Directed by: Aaron Leong
- Written by: Rick Kuebler
- Produced by: Rick Kuebler; Brandy Bianchini; Laura Chick; Terry Kuebler; Jonathan Morken
- Starring: Sean O'Donnel; Gary Busey; Stephen Tobolowsky; Alexandria DeBerry; Dylan Riley Snyder; Michael Eric Reid
- Cinematography: David M. Brewer
- Edited by: Ian Webb
- Music by: John Flanagan
- Production company: My Heros Productions
- Release date: April 1, 2017
- Country: United States
- Language: English

Mamaboy is a 2017 comedy film directed by Aaron Leong and written and produced by Rick Kuebler. The film stars Sean O'Donnell as a teenager who decides to undergo an experimental procedure that enables him to carry his girlfriend's baby to term.

== Plot ==
The adolescent Kelly Hankins (Sean O'Donnell) has a good life. He is admired by his peers, the star of the baseball team, and he is in a happy relationship with the beautiful Lisa Weld (Allie DeBerry), albeit one that they have to hide from her strict father Reverend Weld (Stephen Tobolowsky). However, when Lisa tells him that she is pregnant, Kelly now has to figure out a way to keep her from getting into trouble. He thinks he has found the answer when he discovers that his Uncle Theus (J.D. Rudometkin) has managed to transfer an embryo into a male monkey's abdominal cavity. Certain that this will solve all of their problems, Kelly persuades his uncle to do the same to him.

The process is successful and Kelly becomes pregnant. Over the course of several months, he goes through typical symptoms; hiding it from everyone with only his friend Ditto (Michael Eric Reid) aware of it. Everyone begins to notice Kelly's odd behavior and he loses his popularity, though the flirtatious Candy (Cassidy Ann Shaffer) continues to hit on him. Lisa breaks up with Kelly as she cannot endure seeing Kelly becoming ridiculed. The nerdy Milton (Dylan Riley Snyder) begins to suspect that something is up with Kelly and reviews his findings with Principal Miller (Eric Wheeler), though he has a little trouble believing the concept of a pregnant boy.

Lisa calls Kelly in an effort to get back together with him, on the condition that the baby be transferred back to her. They get into an argument and become even more distant. Realizing that he cannot go on without Lisa, Kelly attempts to get back together with her at the prom. She seems willing to accept him back, but Milton outs the pregnancy to everyone, humiliating Kelly. Soon, the whole town learns of it with Reverend Weld attempting to demonize Kelly, but Theus manages to persuade the congregation that Kelly was fine. As graduation approaches, Kelly is unsure of what to do with himself, but his father backs him up.

The day of graduation arrives and Kelly reluctantly gives a speech to his classmates that is uplifting and empowering. He suddenly faints as he goes into labor and his friends and family rush the stage to help him. Kelly awakens in the hospital with Lisa watching over him. Kelly learns that he has given birth to twins, a boy and a girl. Lisa apologizes for her behavior and wants to raise their children together. She shows that the whole town has been rooting for Kelly's recovery as well as her father who now approves of him.

== Cast ==
- Sean O'Donnell as Kelly Hankins
- Gary Busey as Coach Dombrowski
- Stephen Tobolowsky as Reverend Weld
- Alexandria DeBerry as Lisa Weld
- Dylan Riley Snyder as Milton
- Michael Eric Reid as Ditto
- Cassidy Ann Shaffer as Candy
- Nick Fenske as Jeff Hankins
- Shelley K. Booker as Gloria Hankins
- Michael Reep as Bronco
- Jack Shelton as Jimmy Hankins
- Jesse Miller as Nurse Zelda
- J.D. Rudometkin as Uncle Theus
- Eric Wheeler as Principle Miller
- Peter Wilmer as Baker Frank

== Production ==
The film was largely filmed in the California counties of El Dorado and Placer and filming wrapped in October 2015.
