= Human Rights Commission of Austin (Texas) =

The Human Rights Commission of Austin (Texas) was established on October 5, 1967, by the City of Austin Ordinance 671005-B. The current version of the ordinance can be found at Section 2-1-148 of The Code of the City of Austin, Texas.

The Commission is responsible for promoting freedom from discrimination because of race, color, disability, religion, sex, national origin, sexual orientation, gender identity, or age. The seven Commission members aim to ensure fair treatment of all individuals in the areas of employment, housing, and public accommodations. The Commission has adopted bylaws to govern its duties and procedures.

== General duties ==
The Commission advises and consults with the Austin City Council on all matters involving racial, religious, or ethnic discrimination. It also recommends to the council legislation designed to eliminate prejudice and discrimination.

The Commission advises City of Austin departments, boards, and regulatory agencies to assure effective compliance with non-discrimination policies and orders. It recommends to the Austin city manager ways to improve the ability of city departments and agencies to protect against discrimination. The Commission helps train city employees to use methods that support equal rights and equal treatment, and cooperates with the police department to ensure human rights are covered in the police training curriculum.

The Commission holds public hearings to determine the status and treatment of racial, religious, and ethnic groups in the city and the best means to improve human relations. It also facilitates discussions and negotiations between individuals and groups, and sometimes supports the creation of local community groups. The Commission conducts educational programs to promote equal treatment, opportunity, and understanding. It also sponsors meetings and training to help solve human relations problems.

== Enforcement authority ==
The Commission assists in enforcing laws that prohibit discrimination against people where jurisdiction is not specifically vested in another agency. In addition to this general enforcement authority, the Commission is authorized to enforce certain city, Texas, and United States laws prohibiting discrimination in employment, housing, and public accommodation. This includes the protection of people with HIV/AIDS and those who associate with them.

=== Employment discrimination ===
The Commission is able to enforce certain laws that protect people from difference in treatment in their employment because of their race, color, religion, sex, national origin, age (40 years or older), disability, sexual orientation, or gender identity. Those laws are Title VII of the Civil Rights Act of 1964, the Age Discrimination in Employment Act of 1967, the Americans with Disabilities Act of 1990, Chapter 21 of the Texas Labor Code, and the city's employment ordinance.

The Commission is also authorized to enforce city laws that prohibit employment discrimination by city contractors and subcontractors.

=== Housing discrimination ===
The Commission enforces the City of Austin's housing ordinance, which operates in conjunction with the federal Fair Housing Act of 1968 and the Texas Fair Housing Act. Those laws protect individuals against discrimination concerning the terms and conditions, rental, leasing, buying, or selling of housing based on their race, color, creed, religion, sex, national origin, disability, student status, marital status, familial status, sexual orientation, gender identity, or age (18 years or older).

=== Discrimination in public accommodations ===
The Commission enforces the City of Austin's public accommodations ordinance, which makes it unlawful for public accommodation to deny access to goods, services, facilities, privileges, advantages, and accommodations to anyone based on race, color, religion, sex, sexual orientation, gender identity, national origin, age (18 years or older), or disability. Virtually all businesses are covered by this law.

=== Protecting individuals living with HIV or AIDS against discrimination ===
The Commission enforces the City of Austin's HIV/AIDS ordinance (#861211-V), which protects people who have AIDS, who are infected with HIV, who are perceived to have AIDS or be infected with HIV, or who are perceived to be a risk for any of these conditions. These individuals and those who associate with them are protected from discrimination in employment, housing, city facilities and services, and public accommodations, including business establishments.

=== Protecting individuals living with disabilities against discrimination by the city or its contractors ===
The Commission enforces the City of Austin's general ordinance that protects people living with disabilities from discrimination. This reflects the city's policy that no qualified person living with a disability may, on the basis of the disability, be subjected to discrimination under any program or activity operated by or contracted for by the city. This ordinance applies to both the city and its contractors.
