= World's Worst Tenants =

- Randye Howard, Todd Howard and Rick Moore (from left)
- Genre: Reality
- Starring: Todd Howard; Randye Howard; Rick Moore
- Country of origin: United States
- Original language: English
- No. of seasons: 2
- No. of episodes: 20

Production
- Executive producers: Barry Poznick; Chris Rantamaki; Jeff Savaiano; John Stevens; Chad Greulach
- Running time: 22–24 minutes
- Production company: Zoo Productions

Original release
- Network: Spike
- Release: June 12, 2012 – May 14, 2013

World's Worst Tenants is an American reality television series that aired on Spike from June 12, 2012 to March 12, 2013. The eviction specialists are Todd Howard, Rick Moore and Randye Howard. Though billed as a reality program, it does not document actual events; the show's producers admit that the program depicts "reenactments of many of the actual confrontations that Howard and his team have experienced". The program does not make it clear until the closing credits that the events depicted are in fact reenactments. On November 13, 2012, Spike announced that the series had been renewed for a second season which debuted on March 12, 2013.

== Premise ==
The half-hour show follows three property-eviction specialists as they forcibly remove problem tenants from residential, commercial and retail units. The viewers are taken behind the scenes of the disputes between landlords and tenants. Episodes have included a portly man stuck in a bathtub, a man operating a sweatshop in his garage and an elderly woman with over 20 cannabis plants in a room.

== Episodes ==
=== Series overview ===
Season	Episodes	Originally released	
Season	Episodes	First released	Last released
1	10	June 12, 2012	August 14, 2012
2	10	March 12, 2013	May 14, 2013

=== Season 1 (2012) ===
No. overall	No. in season	Title	Original release date	U.S. viewers (millions)
1	1	"Home On The Gun Range"	June 12, 2012	0.77
2	2	"Rub A Dub, Big Man In A Tub"	June 12, 2012	0.84
3	3	"Trim The Fat"	June 19, 2012	0.88
4	4	"Liquored Up Landlord"	June 26, 2012	1.05
5	5	"Bed Bug Hoarder"	July 10, 2012	0.98
6	6	"Animal Instink"	July 17, 2012	0.71
7	7	"Red Neck Hand Plunge"	July 24, 2012	1.01
8	8	"Too Hot Tub"	July 31, 2012	0.98
9	9	"Kicking Down Doors"	August 7, 2012	1.02
10	10	"Destruction Worker"	August 14, 2012	1.20

=== Season 2 (2013) ===
No. overall	No. in season	Title	Original release date	U.S. viewers (millions)
11	1	"Held At Gunpoint"	March 12, 2013	0.92
12	2	"Motel California"	March 19, 2013	0.68
13	3	"Runaway RV"	March 26, 2013	0.96
14	4	"Burning Man"	April 2, 2013	0.94
15	5	"Rocketfish"	April 9, 2013	0.64
16	6	"Fashionably Stupid"	April 16, 2013	0.81
17	7	"Haulin' A$$"	April 23, 2013	0.90
18	8	"Naughty Nana"	April 30, 2013	0.82
19	9	"Hot Rods"	May 7, 2013	0.82
20	10	"Full Moon Fever"	May 14, 2013	1.01
