= Mateo Arias =

American rapper and actor (born 1995)

- Born: October 31, 1995 (age 31); Atlanta, Georgia, U.S.
- Other name: ¿Téo?
- Occupations: Rapper; singer; songwriter; actor
- Years active: 2005–present
- Relatives: Moisés Arias (brother)

Mateo Arias (born October 31, 1995), also known as Téo (stylized as ¿Téo?), is an American rapper, singer-songwriter and actor. He is best known for starring in the American Disney XD series Kickin' It as Jerry Martinez and the 2020 American coming-of-age story Blast Beat as Carly Andres. In 2018, his debut studio album ¿Téo? was released and has received over 50 million streams on Spotify. Arias has worked with Jaden Smith, Post Malone, Lido, Willow Smith, and Kali Uchis.

== Early life ==
Arias was born in Atlanta, Georgia, to Colombian parents Mónica and César Arias. He grew up in between Lawrenceville and Atlanta in a self-described "pseudo-Colombian culture" and was raised bilingual; he did not speak English until he was about four years old. His older brother is actor and singer Moisés Arias.

== Career ==
Arias started his career as an actor before launching his musical career in 2017 and released his debut single "Uno Dos" which featured his longtime friend Jaden Smith. The following year, he released two singles "Palm Trees" and "Orso (off top)". Since then he has released multiple singles including "Americano", "UNI2", "Hope 4" and "Buzzed" which featured American singer Willow Smith. His debut studio album "¿Téo?" was released in August 2018. In 2021, his second studio album "Sol" was released.

Arias performed at the 22nd Coachella Valley Music and Arts Festival in April 2023.

== Filmography ==
=== Film ===
Year	Title	Role	Notes
2005	Yours, Mine & Ours	Bully	
2012	Brothers in Arms	Matthew	Short film
2015	Blast Beat	Carlos ''Carly'' Andres	Short film
2016	First Girl I Loved	Clifton Martinez	
2016	Good Kids	Lionel “The Lion” Miller	
2018	The Samuel Project	Kasim	
2020	Blast Beat	Carlos ''Carly'' Andres	
2024	Trap	Lead singer of Papa's Boots	Cameo

=== Television ===
Year	Title	Role	Note
2007	Drake & Josh	Reggie	Episode: "Megan's First Kiss"
2007	Hannah Montana	Mateo Suave	Episode: "I Will Always Loathe You"
2009	Cold Case	Gabriel Ariza	2 episodes
2011-2015	Kickin' It	Jerome ''Jerry'' Martínez	Main role

== Discography ==
=== Studio albums ===
Title	Details
¿Téo?	Released: September 23, 2018; Format: Digital download, streaming; Label: 49 Digits LC
Sol	Released: June 11, 2021; Format: Digital download, streaming; Label: 49 Digits/Create Music Group Inc.
Luna	Released: August 18, 2023; Format: Digital download, streaming, LP; Label: 49 Digits/Create Music Group Inc.

=== Extended plays ===
Title	Details
Divine Intoxication	Released: January 14, 2015; Format: Digital download, streaming; Label: Independent
Pockets	Released: April 5, 2018; Format: Digital download, streaming; Label: 49 Digits LLC
BANG BANG!	Released: July 26, 2024; Format: Digital download, streaming; Label: 49 Digits LLC/Create Music Group

=== Singles ===
Title	Year	Album
"Uno Dos” (featuring Jaden Smith)	2017	¿Téo?
"Palm Trees"	2018	Pockets
"Orso (Off Top)"	2018	Pockets
"Americano"	2018	Sol
"UNI2”	2020	Sol
"Hope 4"	2020	Non-album single
"Suplicar"	2020	Sol
"What’s On Your Mind"	2021	Sol
"Buzzed" (featuring Willow)	2021	Sol
“In Your Body"	2022	Non-album singles
"Best Damn Thing"	2022	Non-album singles
"In The Essence"	2022	Non-album singles
“A Mi Cama"	2023	Luna
"Final Step"	2023	Luna
"Don’t Stare Too Long"	2023	Luna
"O My God"	2024	BANG BANG!
"DURO"	2024	BANG BANG!

=== Promotional singles ===
Title	Year	Album
"Eclipse "	2014	Non-album promotional singles
"ER The Faculty"	2014	Non-album promotional singles
"Ether"	2014	Non-album promotional singles
"Encanto Lunar"	2014	Non-album promotional singles
"Flor Delicada"	2014	Non-album promotional singles
"Enlightened Now"	2015	Divine Intoxication
"How Low"	2015	Non-album promotional singles
"Selfless-ish"	2015	Non-album promotional singles
"Pleiadian Message" (featuring Jaden Smith)	2015	Non-album promotional singles
"¡Hagale!	2017	Non-album promotional singles
"(n.) Mari-knee-jah	2018	Non-album promotional singles

=== Other appearances ===
Title	Year	Other artist(s)	Album
"Lonely"	2016	Post Malone, Jaden Smith	August 26th
"Rainbow Bap (Remix)"	2021	Jaden	CTV3: Day Tripper's Edition

=== Music videos ===
Title	Year	Director
"Enlightened Now"	2015	
“¡Hagele!	2017	
"Uno Dos"	2017	Esteban Arango
"Palm Trees"	2018	
"Unitedpalace (Interlude)"	2018	
"In Your Body"	2022	Moises Arias
"Final Step"	2023	Moises Arias

== Accolades ==
Award	Year	Category	Work	Result
Imagen Awards	2014	Best Young Actor -Television	Kickin' It	Nominated
