= Dylan Riley Snyder =

American actor (born 1997)

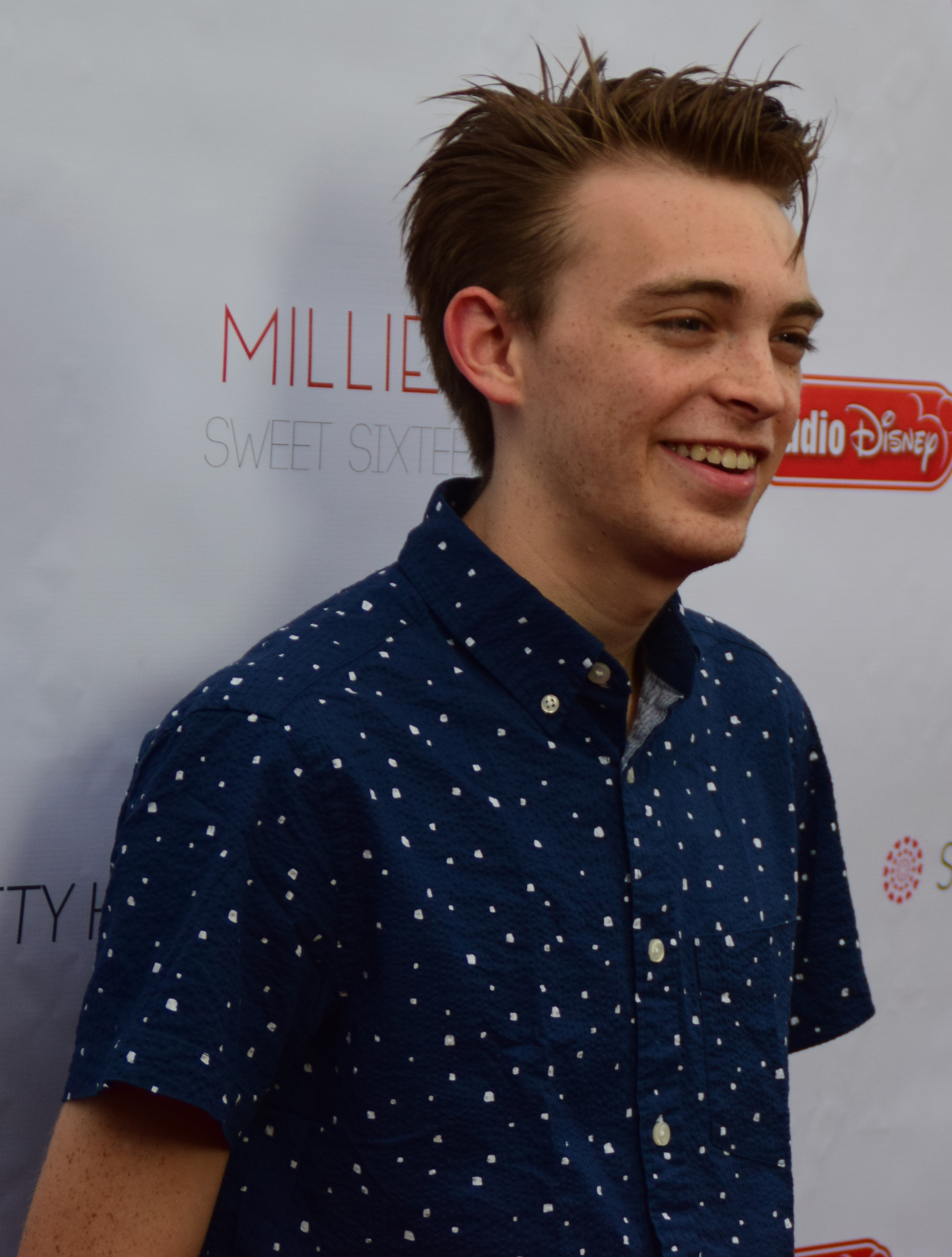
- Snyder in 2015
- Born: Dylan Riley Jacob Snyder; January 24, 1997 (age 29); Tuscaloosa, Alabama, U.S.
- Other name: Dylan R. Snyder
- Occupations: Actor, singer, dancer
- Years active: 2006–present
- Spouse: Allisyn Ashley Arm (m. 2019)
- Website: DylanRileySnyder.com

Dylan Riley Jacob Snyder (born January 24, 1997) is an American actor, filmmaker, and Twitch streamer. Beginning his acting career in community theatre at the age of five, Snyder is known for his acting, singing, and dancing abilities, starring as Young Tarzan in the 2006 Broadway musical, Tarzan, and as Milton Krupnick on the Disney XD comedy series Kickin' It. He won a Drama Desk Award for his role in The Orphans' Home Cycle and earned a Gotham Award nomination for playing Timmy Maplewood in Life During Wartime (2009).

== Early life ==
Dylan Riley Jacob Snyder was born on January 24, 1997, in Tuscaloosa, Alabama, to Ashley (née Castro) and Les Snyder. He is Mexican American through his mother’s side. Snyder has one sibling, an older sister named Cassidy. His older sister was involved in community theatre, and he grew up attending her musical theatre rehearsals. At the age of four, director Brent Jones noticed he could take direction, and at the age of five, his family began letting him audition, leading to his first speaking role as "Tiny Tim" in a community theatre production of A Christmas Carol.

Snyder's appearance as "Tiny Tim" caught the attention of local actor, writer and director Tina Fitch, who was impressed with his work and later cast him in University of Alabama productions when they needed a child performer. His early community theatre credits include Dill Harris in Theatre Tuscaloosa's production of To Kill a Mockingbird and Michael Darling in its production of Peter Pan. For the University of Alabama's theater program, he played Buster in its production of Cat on a Hot Tin Roof, Young Pippin in production of Pippin, and Billy Moore in its production of Assassins.

In 2003, the Snyder family moved to Petal, Mississippi. With his boy soprano range, Snyder performed with the Mississippi Boys Choir and the Hattiesburg Civic Light Opera. In 2005, he was selected for the American Boys Choir; however, after Hurricane Katrina affected Mississippi, Synder and his family moved back to Alabama. There, his family friend Tina Fitch suggested he should try professional theatre in New York City.

== Career ==
In August 2005, Snyder and his mother began preparations to make the move to New York City. Snyder and his mother settled into a Manhattan apartment, while his father remained at his job in Mississippi and his sister attended college in Alabama. He soon began going on professional auditions and, after competing with hundreds of boys for the role, landed the part of "Young Tarzan" in Disney's Broadway musical adaptation of Tarzan. After landing the part, Snyder studied gymnastics. Snyder made his Broadway debut as "Young Tarzan" in September 2006 and alternated in the role with Alex Rutherford (and later with J. Bradley Bowers), appearing in a total of 169 performances until the show closed in July 2007.

While living in New York, Snyder took ballet lessons, tap dance lessons, voice lessons, dialect lessons, and etiquette lessons at the Etiquette School of Manhattan. During this time, he began landing work as a model, appearing in print advertorials for H&M and Lord & Taylor and in commercials for Univest Bank, Benadryl, and Chuck E. Cheese's. He also landed roles on television. On Sesame Street, he appeared on the segments "Jet Side Story" and "Casablanca." He also voiced Griffin and Hound Dog in two episodes of the Nickelodeon animated series, Wonder Pets!. In February 2009, Snyder made his film debut portraying "Leo Amatog", an autistic boy who encounters a self-absorbed Chicago architect during an overnight bus trip in the short film, Valley of the Moon.

In September 2009, Snyder appeared as "Timmy Maplewood" in Todd Solondz' dramatic comedy, Life During Wartime. Touring the film festival circuit for almost a year before getting a limited release in July 2010, the black comedy tackled such controversial subjects as suicide, incest, and pedophilia. The film earned critical acclaim for its director as well as accolades for Snyder, with Variety critic Todd McCarthy writing "The most compelling character this time around is Timmy (Dylan Riley Snyder)", and after commending the film's "superb" cast, McCarthy reserved his highest praise for Snyder, writing "Most heart-wrenching of all is young, freckle-faced Snyder, playing a still prepubescent kid forced to cope with the messiest of adult problems and faced with potential psychological issues he can't possibly digest."

In November 2009, Snyder returned to the New York stage portraying "Young Horace Robedaux," a role based on the father of Pulitzer Prize winning author Horton Foote in the epic nine-part off-Broadway production of The Orphans' Home Cycle. The show was critically acclaimed, and Snyder—along with the rest of the cast, creative team, and producers—was honored with a special Drama Desk Award saluting "the breadth of vision, which inspired the exceptional direction, performances, sets, lighting, costumes, music and sound that made The Orphans' Home Cycle the theatrical event of the season." The play would go on to win the Outer Critics Circle Award and the New York Drama Critics' Circle Award, and ran until May 2010.

In the summer of 2010, Snyder landed his first comedic role, co-starring as awkward honors student turned karate competitor, Milton Krupnick, on the Disney XD original comedy series, Kickin' It. Snyder had no martial arts experience prior to landing the role. When asked about the karate aspect of the show, Snyder explained, "we have choreographers teaching us the moves, but I really enjoy doing the kicks. I lived in New York for five years prior to this and while I was there I did mainly theater. I did a lot of dance so getting into karate was a little easier for me." The pilot was filmed in the summer of 2010, and in November of that year, Snyder and his mother moved to Los Angeles when Disney XD announced it had green-lit the series. Kickin' It premiered in June 2011 and became Disney XD's most-watched original series in the network's history.

Dylan Riley Snyder later worked on his wife Allisyn Ashley Arm's YouTube series Astrid Clover, where he portrays Astrid's boom operator named Boom Guy.

In 2015, Snyder starred in Mamaboy as Milton, the snoopy school newspaper editor/reporter. Mamaboy is about a high school student who must hide the fact that he has become pregnant from his family, friends and the school faculty, including his baseball coach (played by Gary Busey).

== Personal life ==
Snyder lived in Los Angeles with his mother during filming for Kickin' It while his father and sister still resided in Alabama. He is a former member of the Boy Scouts of America as well as one of the founding members of Broadway Kids Care. In 2011, Snyder listed his hobbies as Rubik's Cubes, origami, juggling, billiards and chess.

In December 2014, Snyder started a relationship with Sonny with a Chance actress Allisyn Ashley Arm; they met as teenagers three years previously while their shows filmed on opposite lots across from each other. They got married on September 18, 2019.

== Filmography ==
Film
Year	Film	Role	Notes
2009	Valley of the Moon	Leo Amatog	Short film
2009	Life During Wartime	Timmy Maplewood	Feature film
2015	Mamaboy	Milton	Feature film
2021	Crabs!	Phillip	
Television
Year	Show	Role	Notes
2009	Sesame Street	(Principal performer)	2 segments
2008–2009	Wonder Pets!	Griffin / Hound Dog (voice, uncredited)	2 episodes
2011	Game On!	Himself	1 episode: Pair of Kings vs. Kickin' It
2011–2015	Kickin' It	Milton Krupnick	Co-starring
2013	Modern Family	Neal	Episode: "A Fair to Remember"
2017	Better Call Saul	Young Skeev	Episode: "Mabel"
2019	Will & Grace	DJ	Episode: "Pappa Mia"
Theatre
Year	Show	Role	Notes
2006–2007	Tarzan: The Broadway Musical	Young Tarzan	Broadway
2009–2010	The Orphans' Home Cycle	Horace / Buddy / Horace Jr.	Off-Broadway

== Awards ==
Awards
Year	Award	Category	Role	Film / Show	Result	Ref.
2010	Gotham Award	Best Ensemble Performance (shared with Charlotte Rampling, Allison Janney, Rich Pecci, Michael Lerner, Shirley Henderson, Ally Sheedy, Michael Kenneth Williams, Ciarán Hinds, and Chris Marquette)	Timmy Maplewood	Life During Wartime	Nominated	
2010	Drama Desk Award	Special Award; Saluting "the breadth of vision, which inspired the exceptional direction, performances, sets, lighting, costumes, music and sound that made The Orphans' Home Cycle the theatrical event of the season." (shared with cast, creative team and producers)	Horace, Buddy, Horace Jr.	The Orphans' Home Cycle	Honored	
