= Tri-City Christian School (California) =

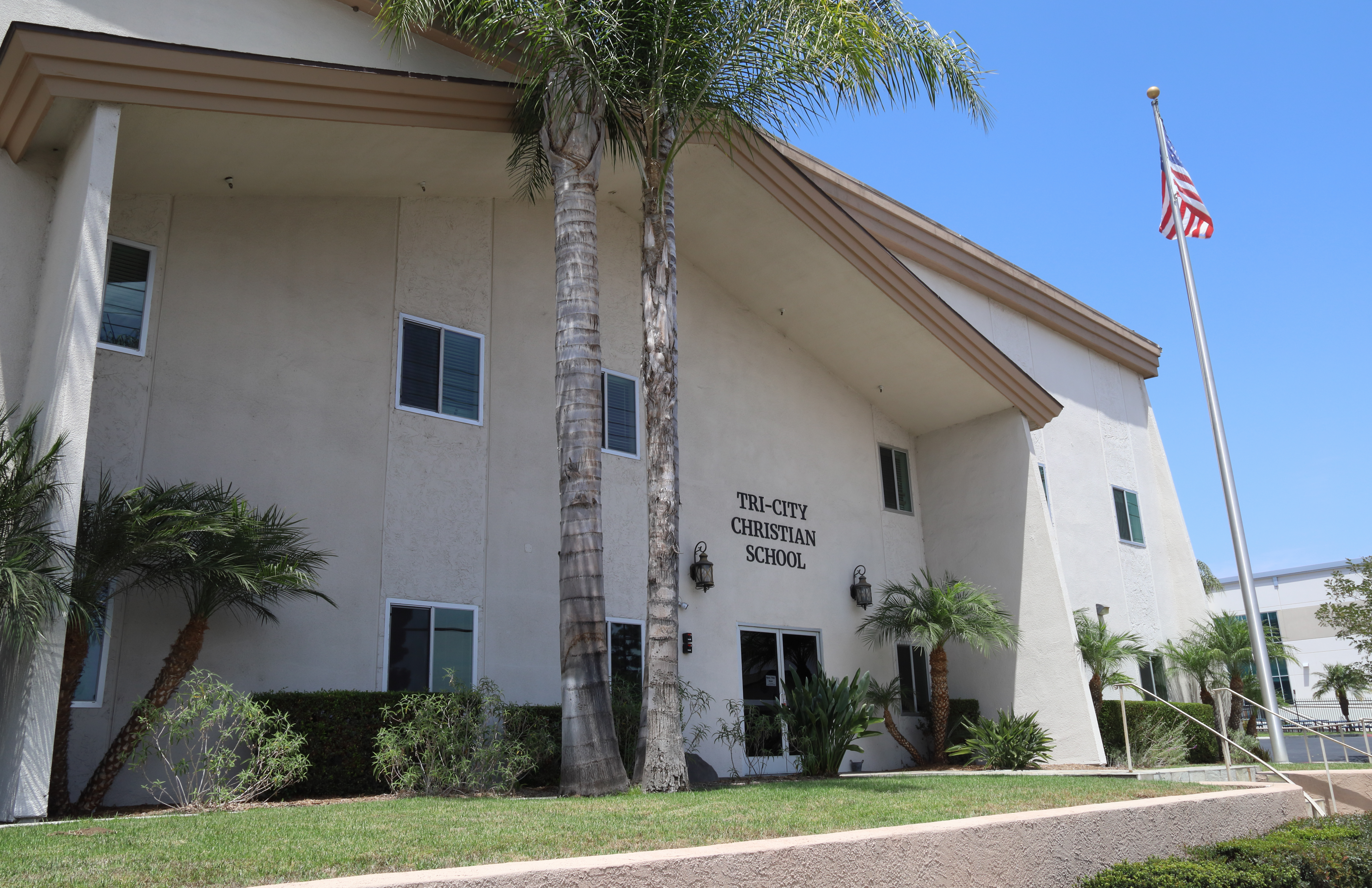

Location
- 302 N. Emerald Drive; Vista, San Diego, California 92083; United States
- Coordinates: 33°11′29.07″N 117°16′47.14″W

Information
- School type: non-profit, Private Christian
- Motto: "Training up spiritual champions for Jesus Christ."
- Religious affiliation: Christian
- Denomination: non-denominational
- Founded: 1971
- Status: open
- Superintendent: Kirk Huckabone
- CEEB code: 053669
- Dean: Cindy Warner (7-12)
- Principal: Curt Greer (K-6), Rod Markum (7-8), Rob Markum (9-12)
- Grades: PS-12
- Average class size: 16:1
- Language: English
- Colours: Red, Blue, White
- Mascot: Eagles
- Accreditation: Association of Christian Schools International, Western Association of Schools and Colleges
- Newspaper: The Eagle Flyer
- Affiliation: Tri-City Bible Church
- Website: http://www.tccs.org

Tri-City Christian School is a private Christian school located in Vista, California. Founded in 1971, the school serves approximately 650 students, from preschool through high school, with the mission of "training up spiritual champions for Jesus Christ." Tri-City Christian School is accredited by the Western Association of Schools and Colleges (WASC) and the Association of Christian Schools International (ACSI).

== Athletics ==
The official school mascot is the Eagle. Depending on the sport, Tri-City Christian High School competes in the Coastal Conference and Pacific League within the San Diego California Scholastic Federation. Following is a list of the sports offered at the high school:

Fall sports	Winter sports	Spring sports
Cheerleading	Basketball	Baseball
Cross country	Soccer	Softball
Football	Wrestling	Gymnastics
Water polo (men)		Lacrosse
Volleyball (women)		Volleyball (men)
Tennis (women)		Swim and dive
Golf (women)		Tennis (men)
Flag football (women)		Golf (men)
		Track and field
Beach volleyball
Volleyball (Frosh/Soph) (women)

Junior High students also get to participate in many of the aforementioned sports. Tri-City Christian School also offers sports for its elementary students. The co-ed program, which is divided into multiple six-week sessions, is called Soaring Eagles and teaches the basics of football, soccer, basketball and more.

== Spiritual life ==
Tri-City Christian School incorporates a biblical worldview into its curriculum. Faith is also encouraged through daily prayer, weekly chapels, service projects and missions trips. All teachers, staff and administrators agree to the schools statement of faith, which is decided upon by its founding church, Tri-City Church in Vista, California.
