= Kickin' It =

2011 American comedy television series

- Genre: Comedy
- Created by: Jim O'Doherty
- Starring: Leo Howard; Dylan Riley Snyder; Mateo Arias; Olivia Holt; Alex Christian Jones; Jason Earles
- Theme music composer: Ali Dee Theodore; Jordan Yaeger; Julian Michael Davis; Jason Gleed
- Composer: Alan Ett
- Country of origin: United States
- Original language: English
- No. of seasons: 4
- No. of episodes: 84 (list of episodes)

Production
- Executive producers: Jim O'Doherty; Marc Warren; David Bickel; J.J. Wall
- Producer: Joey Scott
- Cinematography: Rick F. Gunter; Thomas T. Eckelberry; Bryan Hays
- Camera setup: Multi-camera
- Running time: 21–23 minutes
- Production companies: Poor Soul Productions; It's a Laugh Productions

Original release
- Network: Disney XD
- Release: June 13, 2011 – March 25, 2015

Kickin' It is an American comedy television series created by Jim O'Doherty that aired on Disney XD from June 13, 2011 to March 25, 2015. The series stars Leo Howard, Dylan Riley Snyder, Mateo Arias, Olivia Holt, Alex Christian Jones, and Jason Earles.

== Premise ==
Located in a strip mall, the Bobby Wasabi Martial Arts Academy is known as the worst dojo in the underperforming nationwide Bobby Wasabi chain. To improve the dojo's image, a tight knit crew of underdogs enlists Jack to join and help teach them about life, karate, and friendship.

== Episodes ==
| Season | Episodes | Originally released | |
| Season | Episodes | First released | Last released |
|---|---|---|---|
| 1 | 21 | June 13, 2011 | March 26, 2012 |
| 2 | 23 | April 2, 2012 | December 3, 2012 |
| 3 | 22 | April 1, 2013 | January 27, 2014 |
| 4 | 18 | February 17, 2014 | March 25, 2015 |

== Cast ==
- Leo Howard as Jack
- Dylan Riley Snyder as Milton
- Mateo Arias as Jerry
- Olivia Holt as Kim (seasons 1–3, guest season 4)
- Alex Christian Jones as Eddie (seasons 1–2)
- Jason Earles as Rudy

== Production ==
On November 11, 2010, Disney XD ordered martial arts inspired comedy series Wasabi Warriors, a working title, which was created by Jim O'Doherty, who has previously worked on Grounded for Life and 3rd Rock from the Sun. Jim O'Doherty and Marc Warren serve as executive producers, while Joey Scott serves as producer. Starring in the series are Jason Earles as Rudy, Leo Howard as Jack, Mateo Arias as Jerry, Dylan Riley Snyder as Milton, Alex Christian Jones as Eddie, and Olivia Holt as Kim. The multi-camera series would begin production in Hollywood in January 2011 for a 2011 premiere and would be a production of It's a Laugh Productions. On May 16, 2011, Disney XD announced that the series would be premiering as Kickin' It on June 13, 2011.

The series was inspired by Jim O'Doherty's childhood growing up on Long Island, New York, where he earned a green belt in martial arts, but was forced to end his training when his local dojo closed down and was turned into a veterinary clinic. This childhood connection to martial arts, combined with three of his daughters' interest in karate, laid the foundation for the premise of the series.

On September 21, 2011, Disney XD renewed the series for a second season. On November 5, 2012, Disney XD renewed the series for a third season, with Alex Christian Jones not returning. On August 21, 2013, Disney XD renewed the series for a fourth season, with production to start in Los Angeles in November 2013 for a 2014 premiere. It was also announced that Olivia Holt would be leaving the series to star in Disney Channel's comedy series I Didn't Do It.

== Ratings ==
The series premiere of Kickin' It launched as the highest-rated series premiere in Disney XD history, including when the network was known as Toon Disney. The series premiere garnered 873,000 total viewers and performed well in key demographics, with 578,000 viewers among kids 6–14 and 393,000 viewers among tweens 9–14. Additionally, it marked as the number-one series premiere of all time among kids 6–11, where it received 431,000 viewers.

Viewership and ratings per season of Kickin' It
| Season | Episodes | First aired | | Last aired | | Avg. viewers (millions) |
| Season | Episodes | Date | Viewers (millions) | Date | Viewers (millions) | Avg. viewers (millions) |
|---|---|---|---|---|---|---|
| 1 | 21 | June 13, 2011 | 0.87 | March 26, 2012 | 0.78 | 0.78 |
| 2 | 23 | April 2, 2012 | 0.65 | December 2, 2012 | 0.65 | 0.63 |
| 3 | 22 | April 1, 2013 | 0.92 | January 27, 2014 | 0.67 | 0.69 |
| 4 | 16 | February 17, 2014 | 0.82 | March 25, 2015 | 0.41 | 0.55 |
