= List of Jake and the Never Land Pirates episodes =

Jake and the Never Land Pirates (also known as Captain Jake and the Never Land Pirates in the fourth and final season and associated merchandise) is an Annie Award-winning musical and interactive animated television series shown on Disney Jr.. Based on Disney's Peter Pan franchise (itself based on the famous book and play by British author J.M. Barrie), this was the first Disney Junior original show following the switch from Playhouse Disney. It stars Gabe Eggerling, Megan Richie, Jadon Sand, David Arquette, Corey Burton, Jeff Bennett and Loren Hoskins. The titular character Jake was previously voiced by Colin Ford, and then by the late Cameron Boyce, then later by Sean Ryan Fox, then by Riley Thomas Stewart, and finally by Eggerling, while Izzy and Cubby were voiced for the first three seasons by Madison Pettis and Jonathan Morgan Heit, respectively, before they were replaced by Richie and Sand midway through season 3. The series was developed by Disney veteran Bobs Gannaway, whose works include another Disney Jr. series, Mickey Mouse Clubhouse, and films such as Secret of the Wings, The Pirate Fairy, and Planes: Fire & Rescue.

== Series overview ==
Season	Segments	Episodes	Originally released	
Season	Segments	Episodes	First released	Last released
1	49	25	February 14, 2011	February 13, 2012
2	68	36	February 24, 2012	December 6, 2013
3	63	34	January 3, 2014	September 11, 2015
4	35	19	October 16, 2015	November 6, 2016

== Episodes ==
=== Season 1 (2011–12) ===
No. overall	No. in season	Title	Directed by	Written by	Storyboard by	Original release date	Prod. code	U.S. viewers (millions)
1	1	"Hide the Hideout!"	Howy Parkins	Mark Seidenberg	Troy Adomitis and Rossen Varbanov	February 14, 2011	102	2.34
1	1	"The Old Shell Game"	Howy Parkins	Don Gillies	Roger Dondis	February 14, 2011	102	2.34
A boy named Jake and his crew try to protect their secret hideout (which is in fact their living quarters) from an ambush led by Captain Hook. Izzy finds a beautiful shell, but Captain Hook sets his hand and hook on it. It turns out that the shell that they try to get has a hermit crab named Snappy. Song: Aw Coconuts
2	2	"Hats Off to Hook!"	Howy Parkins	Kevin D. Campbell	Bob Foster	February 15, 2011	101	N/A
2	2	"Escape from Belch Mountain"	Howy Parkins	Mark Drop	Dave Bennett	February 15, 2011	101	N/A
Jake tries to give Captain Hook's hat to him after it washes up on sea. When trying to convince Hook has failed, Jake and his crew manage to put Captain Hook's hat by dropping it on his head when he's not looking. The pirate kids attempt to reclaim Jake's guitar from Captain Hook, who, irritated of their rock music, plans to throw it into Belch Mountain. Songs: Hot Lava (Day Version), Never Land Pirate Band
3	3	"Off the Hook"	Howy Parkins	Mark Seidenberg	Dave Williams	February 16, 2011	103	N/A
3	3	"Never Say Never!"	Howy Parkins	Ashley Mendoza	Carin-Anne Greco	February 16, 2011	103	N/A
Captain Hook steals Jake's skateboard but it runs down a hill and he and his crew must hop on to it for getting it back. Captain Hook sends Never Bird to steal Izzy's hipster-twister hoop, but Never Bird quickly turns on him. Song: Never Land Pirate Band
4	4	"Yo Ho, Food to Go!"	Howy Parkins	Kelly Ward	Dave Bennett	February 17, 2011	104	N/A
4	4	"Basketballs Aweigh!"	Howy Parkins	Mark Drop	Dave Williams	February 17, 2011	104	N/A
The pirate kids try to retrieve the healthy snacks that Cubby has prepared before Captain Hook and Mr. Smee eat them. While playing basketball, Captain Hook steals the ball that the young pirates are using to play, and eventually challenge them into a do-or-die basketball game. Songs: What's Cooking, Smee?, Shipwreck Shuffle
5	5	"The Sky's the Limit!"	Howy Parkins	Mark Drop	Bob Foster	February 18, 2011	105	N/A
5	5	"Bucky Makes a Splash"	Howy Parkins	Don Gillies	Carin-Anne Greco	February 18, 2011	105	N/A
Captain Hook tries to swipe the kids's kites for amusement purposes. After the Jolly Roger runs aground, Captain Hook and Mr. Smee resolve to steal Jake's pirate ship, Bucky. Jake and his crew sneak aboard Bucky and attempt to reclaim him. Song: Bucky's Shanty
6	6	"Happy Hook Day!"	Howy Parkins	Kevin D. Campbell	Roger Dondis	February 19, 2011	106	N/A
6	6	"No Returns!"	Howy Parkins	Nicole Dubuc	Troy Adomitis	February 19, 2011	106	N/A
Jake and his crew throw a birthday party for Skully, only for Captain Hook to swipe the birthday presents. Captain Hook steals Jake's boomerang, but since he doesn't know what a boomerang is and how it is used, he has nothing but bad luck as the boomerang keeps flying at him. So, he and his crew try to return the boomerang to them. Song: Hot Lava
7	7	"Izzy's Pirate Puzzle"	Howy Parkins	Nicole Dubuc	Dave Bennett	February 21, 2011	108	N/A
7	7	"The Never Land Games"	Howy Parkins	Mark Drop	Dave Williams	February 21, 2011	108	N/A
Captain Hook steals Izzy's puzzle box because he believes it is a treasure chest with valuable treasury. Jake and his crew challenge Captain Hook on an obstacle course to win the Never Land Games trophy. Song: Tick Tock Croc
8	8	"Free Wheeling Fun"	Howy Parkins	Don Gillies	Carin-Anne Greco	February 22, 2011	109	N/A
8	8	"The Race to Never Peak!"	Howy Parkins	Bobs Gannaway	Bob Foster	February 22, 2011	109	N/A
Captain Hook steals the gang's bicycle built for three, but cannot stop it when it goes too fast. Captain Hook swipes Jake's soccer ball and accidentally blasts it all the way to Never Peak Mountain. Songs: Aw Coconuts, Never Land Pirate Band
9	9	"Cubby's Sunken Treasure"	Howy Parkins	Kevin D. Campbell	Roger Dondis	February 23, 2011	110	N/A
9	9	"Cubby's Goldfish"	Howy Parkins	Brian Swenlin	Troy Adomitis	February 23, 2011	110	N/A
Cubby discovers a clue to a sunken treasure from the legendary Captain Fisher. Captain Hook steals Cubby's pet goldfish, Gilly. Song: Pirate Password (Hook's Treasure Cave Version) Note: "Cubby's Goldfish" was also shown in some international screenings before Winnie the Pooh (2011).
10	10	"Surfin' Turf"	Howy Parkins	Mark Seidenberg	Dave Williams	February 24, 2011	111	N/A
10	10	"The Seahorse Roundup"	Howy Parkins	Don Gillies	Dave Bennett	February 24, 2011	111	N/A
Marina the Mermaid teaches Jake and his crew how to surf, and then Captain Hook takes their surfboard. Guest star: Ariel Winter as Marina the Mermaid Jake and his crew try to rescue Never Land's seahorses after Captain Hook traps all of them. Song: Castaway on Pirate Island (Original Version)
11	11	"It's a Pirate Picnic!"	Howy Parkins	Thomas Hart	Roger Dondis	February 25, 2011	113	N/A
11	11	"The Key to Skull Rock"	Howy Parkins	Ashley Mendoza	Troy Adomitis	February 25, 2011	113	N/A
The kids are preparing for a picnic at Butterfly Bluff, but Captain Hook takes their map and tries to dig up their perfect picnic spot Believing that there is treasure hidden. The crew receives a key to open a treasure at Skull Rock but Captain Hook steals it. Song: Hot Lava (Night Version)
12	12	"The Never Bloom!"	Howy Parkins	Kevin D. Campbell	Larry Leker	February 28, 2011	114	N/A
12	12	"Jake's Starfish Search"	Howy Parkins	Don Gillies	Rossen Varbanov	February 28, 2011	114	N/A
Jake and his crew discover a strange plant called The Never Bloom in Never Land which blooms every century. Captain Hook wants to take the plant for himself, but all it does is sing and dance. When Captain Hook injures his index finger, he hears Marina's starfish Sandy singing his favorite nursery rhyme and captures the starfish, eventually to make the starfish sing for him and Smee. Guest star: Ariel Winter as Marina the Mermaid Song: Roll Up the Map
13	13	"Hook Seals a Deal!"	Howy Parkins	Ashley Mendoza	Dave Bennett	March 18, 2011	115	N/A
13	13	"The Emerald Coconut"	Howy Parkins	Mark Drop	Dave Williams	March 18, 2011	115	N/A
Jake, Izzy, Cubby, and Captain Hook investigate on who has been taking their things. The thief turns out to be Lucille The Never Land Seal. When the pirate crew are taking a picture of the legendary emerald coconut for their photo album, Captain Hook steals it and get Jake and Izzy caught in a booby trap. Cubby and Skully later get it back and rescue their friends. Song: Aw Coconuts
14	14	"The Golden Twilight Treasure"	Howy Parkins	Brian Swenlin	Bob Foster	March 28, 2011	116	N/A
14	14	"Rock the Croc!"	Howy Parkins	Nicole Dubuc	Carin-Anne Greco	March 28, 2011	116	N/A
Jake and his crew try to rescue a firefly named Brightly who is stolen by Captain Hook who uses it to light the way in the night while looking for the golden twilight treasure in Big Bug Valley. A map to Pirate's Plunge in a bottle lands in the mouth of the Crocodile, and both Jake and his crew and Captain Hook try multiple attempts to get it back. Song: Tick Tock Croc
15	15	"The Elephant Surprise!"	Howy Parkins	Thomas Hart	Rossen Varbanov	April 4, 2011	117	N/A
15	15	"Jake's Jungle Groove"	Howy Parkins	Don Gillies	Roger Dondis	April 4, 2011	117	N/A
The crew gets a wooden elephant as a present, unaware that Captain Hook is inside the elephant and plans to fill it with their treasures. Izzy and Cubby show Jake how to dance to Peter Pan's bongos which make Hook dance very strangely. When Hook tries to steal the bongos, a monkey takes them. Guest star: Ariel Winter as Marina the Mermaid Songs: Cranky Crook, Never Land Pirate Band
16	16	"The Golden Egg"	Howy Parkins	Ashley Mendoza	Carin-Anne Greco	April 11, 2011	112	N/A
16	16	"Huddle Up!"	Howy Parkins	Mark Drop	Bob Foster	April 11, 2011	112	N/A
Skully discovers a golden egg, and the crew tries to figure out who the golden egg belongs to. But Captain Hook wants to steal it thinking that it's treasure and it later reveals to be a Never Land humming bird. The pirate crew play a game of football. But when Captain Hook thinks their ball has special teamwork powers, he takes it. Song: Shipwreck Shuffle
17	17	"Save the Coral Cove!"	Howy Parkins	Don Gillies	Carin-Anne Greco	April 22, 2011	119	N/A
17	17	"Treasure Chest Switcheroo"	Howy Parkins	Mark Drop	Bob Foster	April 22, 2011	119	N/A
Jake, Izzy, Cubby, Skully, and Marina arrive at Coral Cove to protect the underwater creatures who live there when Captain Hook uses a machine to dig for treasure underwater. Guest star: Ariel Winter as Marina the Mermaid Captain Hook steals the team treasure chest from Pirate Island and tries to open it. Jake and his crew will do anything to keep Hook from opening their enchanted treasure chest. Song: Pirate Password (Jolly Roger Version)
18	18	"Birds of a Feather"	Howy Parkins	Kevin D. Campbell	Dave Bennett	May 21, 2011	118	N/A
18	18	"Treasure Show and Tell!"	Howy Parkins	Mark Seidenberg	Dave Williams	May 21, 2011	118	N/A
Skully has a new friend named Winger and the crew tries to help them find the SkyBird Island Treasure. Ultimately, it is revealed that Winger herself is the SkyBird Island Princess. Guest stars: Lisa Loeb as Winger and Adam West as Wise Old Parrot Mr. Smee plans a treasure hunt to make Captain Hook happy and enlists Jake and his crew to help. Song: Never Land Pirate Band
19	19	"The Pirate Princess"	Howy Parkins	Ashley Mendoza	Rossen Varbanov	June 17, 2011	120	N/A
19	19	"The Rainbow Wand"	Howy Parkins	Ashley Mendoza	Roger Dondis	June 17, 2011	120	N/A
The crew sets off to their first piracy journey to free The Pirate Princess from a Sea Witch's curse that turned her to gold, and while they're at it, prevent Captain Hook from taking her golden pirate ship. Notes: The Pirate Princess the first part of the 19th episode of Jake and the Never Land Pirates also served as a first favorite episode for kids of all ages. Jake and his crew attempt to return the Rainbow Wand to the Pirate Princess while Captain Hook tries to take it for himself. Guest star: Tori Spelling as the Pirate Princess Song: Never Land Pirate Band
20	20	"The Sword and the Stone"	Howy Parkins	Mark Drop	Dave Williams	August 26, 2011	121	N/A
20	20	"Jake's Home Run!"	Howy Parkins	Don Gillies	Dave Bennett	August 26, 2011	121	N/A
There is a mysterious door that only Jake's sword can open. Hook steals the sword and tries to open the door with it but only Jake can do it because he is a pirate with a pure heart. Captain Hook steals Jake's baseball, so Jake and the crew attempt to get it back before Hook throws it to the bottomless and later reveals that Captain Hook was actually the best baseball player. Song: Roll Up the Map
21	21	"Captain Hook's Parrot"	Howy Parkins	Mark Drop and Mark Seidenberg	Roger Dondis	September 19, 2011	124	N/A
21	21	"SkyBird Island is Falling!"	Howy Parkins	Story by : Kevin D. Campbell, Mark Drop, and Mark Seidenberg; Written by : Mark Drop and Kevin D. Campbell	Phil Weinstein and Dave Williams	September 19, 2011	124	N/A
Captain Hook wants a loyal bird friend like Skully, so he captures Skully while he and his friends are playing Hide and Go Seek. SkyBird Island begins to fall from the sky after Captain Hook steals the golden leaves from their magic golden tree which maintains the island levitating. Guest star: Lisa Loeb as Winger and Adam West as Wise Old Parrot Song: Hot Lava
22	22	"Night of the Golden Pumpkin"	Howy Parkins	Mark Seidenberg	Rossen Varbanov	October 14, 2011	107	N/A
22	22	"Trick or Treasure!"	Howy Parkins	Kevin D. Campbell	Tony Craig	October 14, 2011	107	N/A
The gang searches for the Golden Pumpkin before Captain Hook takes it. Captain Hook goes in disguise to steal the pirate kids' Halloween treats. Song: Trick or Treasure
23	23	"The Pirate Pup!"	Howy Parkins	Mark Seidenberg	Kenny Thompkins	November 10, 2011	123	N/A
23	23	"Pirate Rock!"	Howy Parkins	Kevin D. Campbell	Rossen Varbanov	November 10, 2011	123	N/A
Captain Hook's boot is taken by Jake's puppy, Patch. Jake and his crew play special rock music and start their own Never Land Pirate Band. But Captain Hook wants to sabotage it and also becomes irritated when Smee, Bones, and Sharky also are influenced to sing their song. Guest star: Ariel Winter as Marina the Mermaid Song: Never Land Pirate Band
24	24	"It's a Winter Never Land!"	Howy Parkins	Mark Seidenberg	Carin-Anne Greco	December 2, 2011	122	N/A
24	24	"Hook on Ice!"	Howy Parkins	Mark Drop	Bob Foster	December 2, 2011	122	N/A
In a Christmas episode, the gang discovers that Peter Pan has left presents and a tree for the crew. Unfortunately, Captain Hook takes all of them, but eventually regrets it and returns them to the crew. Guest star: Ariel Winter as Marina the Mermaid Jake's crew teams up with Captain Hook's crew to find a legendary snow treasure. Song: Castaway on Pirate Island (Christmas Version)
25	25	"Peter Pan Returns"	Howy Parkins	Story by : Mark Seidenberg; Written by : Mark Seidenberg, Mark Drop, and Kevin D. Campbell	Carin-Anne Greco, Bob Foster, Dave Williams, Dave Bennett and Larry Leker	February 13, 2012	125_126	3.09
One night, Peter Pan's shadow makes way for Neverland and visits the Jolly Roger: the ship of the villainous Captain Hook. There, he bothers Hook and his crew by awakening them from their slumber. Meanwhile, Peter Pan himself visits Pirate Island and reunites with his pirate team consisting of Jake, Izzy, Cubby, and Skully. He informs them of the missing shadow and the friends set off to find it. Back on the Jolly Roger, the shadow has proceeded in revealing itself. This alerts Hook and the crew of Peter's presence in Never Land. The captain plots to capture the shadow and use it as hostage to lure Peter to him. However, the shadow proves to be elusive as a chase leads the pirates to be thrown overboard and the Jolly Roger to be taken over by the shadow. The shadow, and the villain pirates, make way from Never Land. Once there, Hook finally bags the shadow. Peter, Jake and the crew begin their search on the shore of Never Land where they find a note from Hook informing them of the impounded shadow. The heroes set off to meet Hook at Buccaneer's Bluff to settle the score. Instead, Hook attempts to force the heroes out of Never Land for the safety of the shadow. Peter rejects the offer resulting into Hook and his crew taking the shadow to The Valley of Shadows. As the name suggests, the valley is filled with shadows made by various things. As the plan goes, Hook will unleash the shadow there so that Peter will never find it. As Peter and the crew make way for the valley, Peter's flight begins to die down. Being that Peter's thoughts are filled with worries about his shadow, he's beginning to lose his flight as it can only be accessed through happy thoughts. Unfortunately for Hook, Peter and Jake arrive on time. Instead, Hook decides to sink the shadow to the bottom of the Never Sea. Using Bucky, Peter, Jake, and the crew catches up to the Jolly Roger. A battle follows including events such as Izzy, Cubby, and Skully getting trapped under the sail and Jake grabbing the chest with Peter's shadow inside but his vest is caught by Captain Hook's hook, the fight ends with the shadow being reattached to Peter, the villains falling overboard, and the crocodile chasing after them. In celebration of the success, Peter, Jake, Izzy, Cubby and Skully fly through Pirate Island. Much to the young pirates' surprise, Peter and his shadow are now ready to depart to explore new parts of the world and discover new adventures. The friends bid farewell to their friend. Right after, Hook, Smee, Sharky, and Bones are seen on a spit of land watching in horror as Tick-Tock the Crocodile and a large float of hungry crocodiles begin to swarm around Hook. Guest star: Adam Wylie as Peter Pan Song: Never Land Pirate Band (Extended Version)

=== Season 2 (2012–13) ===
No. overall	No. in season	Title	Directed by	Written by	Storyboard by	Original release date	Prod. code	US viewers (millions)
26	1	"Bucky's Anchor Aweigh!"	Howy Parkins	Mark Drop	Carin-Anne Greco	February 24, 2012	TBA	N/A
26	1	"The Never Rainbow"	Howy Parkins	Brian Swenlin	Sharon Forward	February 24, 2012	TBA	N/A
The kids give Bucky a golden anchor, but Captain Hook steals it. An enraged Bucky goes after him and Jake and his crew must catch up to him without a ship. Guest star: Ariel Winter as Marina the Mermaid Jake and his crew help the Pirate Princess re-charge her Rainbow Wand on the Dazzle Diamond before the Never Rainbow disappears along with the Diamond. Guest star: Tori Spelling as Pirate Princess Song: Where the Rainbow Lands
27	2	"Peter's Musical Pipes"	Howy Parkins	Mark Drop	Dave Williams	February 24, 2012	TBA	N/A
27	2	"The Never Night Star"	Howy Parkins	Brian Swenlin	Rossen Varbanov	February 24, 2012	TBA	N/A
The kids discover Peter Pan's pan flute and use it to find a treasure. Joining them on their quest are Sharky and Bones, who were ordered by Captain Hook to walk the plank. The pirate crew follows the Never Night Star to find the Lost City of Gold. Song: Gold Doubloons
28	3	"Race-Around Rock!"	Howy Parkins	Mark Drop	Carin-Anne Greco	March 16, 2012	TBA	N/A
28	3	"Captain Hook is Missing!"	Howy Parkins	Brian Swenlin	Sharon Forward	March 16, 2012	TBA	N/A
Jake, Izzy, Cubby, and Captain Hook are all racing to Race-Around Rock. When they reach the finish line, Cubby wins! Captain Hook goes missing, so Sharky, Bones, and Mr. Smee ask Jake and his crew for help. It turns out that Captain Hook was actually sleepwalking. Song: Spyglass
29	4	"Captain Hook's Hooks"	Howy Parkins	Mark Drop	Bob Foster	March 23, 2012	TBA	N/A
29	4	"Mr. Smee's Pet"	Howy Parkins	Brian Swenlin	Stark Howell	March 23, 2012	TBA	N/A
Jake and his crew help Sharky and Bones recover Captain Hook's stolen hooks from an octopus. Captain Hook looks after Mr. Smee's pet chameleon Blinky, but it goes off on its own and causes strange stuff to happen when Jake and his crew go fishing. Song: Hook's Hooks
30	5	"Pirates of the Desert"	Howy Parkins	Don Gillies	Carin-Anne Greco	April 6, 2012	TBA	N/A
30	5	"The Great Pirate Pyramid"	Howy Parkins	Don Gillies	Sharon Forward	April 6, 2012	TBA	N/A
Jake and the crew travel to the Never Land Desert to help Captain Flynn find his abandoned ship but Captain Hook wants it to make him the better captain than Flynn. Jake and the crew team up with Captain Flynn to find the treasure in the Great Pirate Pyramid. Guest star: Josh Duhamel as Captain Flynn Song: Pirate Island Hideout
31	6	"Mama Hook Knows Best"	Howy Parkins	Mark Seidenberg	Bob Foster	May 4, 2012 (Note: This episode was first released in Peter Pan Returns DVD on April 3, 2012.)	TBA	N/A
31	6	"Pixie Dust Away!"	Howy Parkins	Mark Seidenberg	Stark Howell	May 4, 2012	TBA	N/A
Mama Hook pays a visit to Captain Hook and encourages him to find a treasure, but instead he takes treasure from Jake, Izzy, Cubby, and Skully on their own treasure hunt. Guest star: Sharon Osbourne as Mama Hook It's Pixie Dust Away Day! Unfortunately, an eager Izzy spills all of her Pixie Dust. She and her friends go to the Fountain of Forever to get some more, but Hook is on the trail as well. Song: Pirate Mom
32	7	"Captain Hook's Lagoon"	Howy Parkins	Don Gillies	Kelly James	June 8, 2012	TBA	N/A
32	7	"Undersea Bucky!"	Howy Parkins	Mark Drop	Dave Williams	June 8, 2012	TBA	N/A
Captain Hook tries to create his own lagoon by draining the water out at Pirates's Plunge. While helping Marina restore power to the Underwater Neptune City, Jake and his crew discover that Bucky can turn into a submarine. Captain Hook wants to see if there's any sunken treasure while Smee on the other hand, wants to find the Jolly Roger's anchor. Guest star: Ariel Winter as Marina the Mermaid and Tiffani Thiessen as the Mermaids Song: Bubbly Blue
33	8	"A Feather in Hook's Hat"	Howy Parkins	Nicole Dubuc	Kelly James	June 15, 2012	TBA	N/A
33	8	"A Whale of a Tale"	Howy Parkins	Kelly Ward	Sharon Forward and Dave Williams	June 15, 2012	TBA	N/A
A yellow feather on Jake's pirate hat is ruined, so the crew tries to find the Sing-Song Bird to get a new one but Captain Hook envies Jake's feather so he wants to get one for himself. Izzy becomes a doctor for the day and tries to make a whale feel better after it swallows a treasure chest that Hook found. Song: Walkin' the Plank
34	9	"Hooked!"	Howy Parkins	Mark Seidenberg	Stark Howell	June 29, 2012	TBA	N/A
34	9	"The Never Land Pirate Ball"	Howy Parkins	Mark Drop	Sharon Forward and Bob Foster	June 29, 2012	TBA	N/A
Jake and his crew help Captain Hook and Red Jessica find a Ruby Heart. Jake and his crew teach Captain Hook how to perform a special dance at Red Jessica's Never Land Pirate Ball. Guest star: Jane Kaczmarek as Red Jessica Song: Rattle Yer Bones
35	10	"The Mermaid's Song"	Howy Parkins	Don Gillies	Kirk Hanson	July 27, 2012	TBA	N/A
35	10	"Treasure of the Tides"	Howy Parkins	Kelly Ward	Thomas Morgan	July 27, 2012	TBA	N/A
Marina's sister Stormy puts Captain Hook, Mr. Smee, and Cubby under the spell of The Mermaid's Song to gather 3 things: Seaweed, Seashells, and Coconuts. Marina and the other mermaids surprise Izzy by making her an honorary mermaid during the Treasure of the Tides ceremony. However, Captain Hook has other plans and wants to steal the golden throne for himself. Can Izzy and the mermaids, with help from Izzy’s crew, stop Hook and save the throne before the ceremony is ruined? Guest stars: Tiffani Thiessen as the Mermaids, Ariel Winter as Marina the Mermaid, and Allisyn Ashley Arm as Stormy the Mermaid Song: Where the Rainbow Lands
36	11	"Big Bug Valley"	Howy Parkins	Don Gillies	Dave Williams	August 10, 2012	TBA	N/A
36	11	"The Queen of Never Land"	Howy Parkins	Brian Swenlin	Kelly James	August 10, 2012	TBA	N/A
Cubby is scared to go with Jake and his crew into Big Bug Valley, so Jake calms him and encourages him to be brave when they find the legendary Golden Caterpillar. The Pirate Princess and Princess Winger are invited to meet The Queen of Never Land, unaware that this "queen" is really Captain Hook in disguise. Guest stars: Tori Spelling as Pirate Princess and Lisa Loeb as Winger Song: Hammock
37	12	"Hook and the Itty-Bitty Kitty"	Howy Parkins	Mark Drop	Sharon Forward	August 24, 2012	TBA	N/A
37	12	"Pirate Campout"	Howy Parkins	Mark Drop	Carin-Anne Greco	August 24, 2012	TBA	N/A
Captain Hook looks after Red Jessica's kitten, Rosie. Guest star: Jane Kaczmarek as Red Jessica Jake and his crew are going camping in Doubloon Lagoon, but Captain Hook wants to come too. Song: Walkin’ the Plank
38	13	"Tricks, Treats and Treasure!"	Howy Parkins	Brian Swenlin	Carin-Anne Greco	October 5, 2012	TBA	N/A
38	13	"Season of the Sea Witch"	Howy Parkins	Brian Swenlin	Sharon Forward	October 5, 2012	TBA	N/A
Jake, Izzy, Cubby, and Skully are out trick or treating in Never Land, but Hook tries to steal their treats. Guest stars: Allisyn Ashley Arm as Stormy and Josh Duhamel as Captain Flynn Izzy and the crew help the Pirate Princess stop the evil Sea Witch from turning her into gold again. With the help of the Pirate Princess’s Rainbow Wand, they work together to transform the Sea Witch into a kind and friendly witch. Guest stars: Tori Spelling as Pirate Princess, Carol Kane as the Sea Witch, and Tiffani Thiessen as Misty the Wonderful Witch. Song: Rattle Yer Bones
39	14	"Cookin' with Hook"	Howy Parkins	Don Gillies	Bob Foster	November 26, 2012	TBA	1.52
39	14	"Captain Flynn's New Matey"	Howy Parkins	Mark Drop	Stark Howell	November 26, 2012	TBA	1.52
Jake and his crew are preparing for a Thanksgiving feast on Pirate Island. Captain Hook and his mother are also preparing for their own Thanksgiving dinner on the Jolly Roger. Guest star: Sharon Osbourne as Mama Hook Captain Flynn asks Cubby to help him read a series of treasure maps that lead to the Enchanted Golden Goblet, a magical goblet that is always filled with water. Guest star: Josh Duhamel as Captain Flynn Song: Pirate Rock Recipe
40	15	"Jake and the Beanstalk"	Howy Parkins	Story by : Mark Seidenberg; Written by : Brian Swenlin	Kelly James	November 27, 2012	TBA	1.52
40	15	"Little Red Riding Hook!"	Howy Parkins	Mark Seidenberg	Dave Williams and Kirk Hanson	November 27, 2012	TBA	1.52
Jake discovers some magical beans glowing from the right side of his vest. When he plants them, they quickly grow into a giant beanstalk. Jake and his crew climb the beanstalk and discover a golden crocodile guarding a nest filled with golden eggs. However, Captain Hook finds out about the treasure and decides to steal the golden eggs for himself. Jake's pirate puppy Patch finds many treasures and puts them in a basket, but forgets to take them home with him, so Izzy decides to deliver them to him before Captain Hook tries to steal them. Song: Gold Doubloons
41	16	"Jake Saves Bucky"	Howy Parkins	Story by : Mark Seidenberg; Teleplay by : Mark Drop and Mark Seidenberg	Dave Williams, Kelly James, Stark Howell, Bob Foster, and Kirk Hanson	September 19, 2012	TBA	1.88
According to the Never Land Pirate Code, Jake and his crew must race Bucky against the Jolly Roger and the sneaky Captain Hook. But if Bucky loses, he’ll belong to Hook forever! Of course, Hook uses every trick in the book and wins the race! But, Jake and his crew might have a way to get Bucky back. With the help of Peter Pan, the young pirates embark on an adventure across Never Land that includes getting past a fire-breathing dragon! With your help, Jake’s crew can save Bucky from the devious Captain Hook! Guest stars: Adam Wylie as Peter Pan Song: Belay (extended version) Note: This is the last episode where Colin Ford voices Jake due to hitting puberty.
42	17	"Izzy's Trident Treasure"	Howy Parkins	Brian Swenlin	Bob Foster and Carin-Anne Greco	November 28, 2012	1.56	
42	17	"Pirate Putt-Putt"	Howy Parkins	Don Gillies	Stark Howell	November 28, 2012	1.56	
Honorary mermaid Izzy helps Marina and Stormy uncover the Ancient Trident Treasure. Guest stars: Ariel Winter as Marina and Allisyn Ashley Arm as Stormy Jake and his crew play mini-golf on Never Land. Hook wants to play as well so he can feel like a winner. Song: Hook’s Hooks Note: This is the first episode where Cameron Boyce voices Jake.
43	18	"Sail Away Treasure"	Howy Parkins	Brian Swenlin	Kelly James	November 29, 2012	1.73	
43	18	"The Mystery of Mysterious Island!"	Howy Parkins	Don Gillies	Dave Williams and Rossen Varbanov	November 29, 2012	1.73	
Jake and his crew rebuild a shipwrecked flying ship for Skully to ride around in, and they discover a treasure map on the sail. Guest stars: Lisa Loeb as Winger and Adam West as Wise Old Parrot There's an island that mysteriously vanishes and reappears in a different place, so Jake and the crew discover it before Captain Hook gets to it. They discover that the island is actually a giant Sea Turtle. Song: Goodbye Crew
44	19	"A Bad Case of Barnacles"	Howy Parkins	Mark Drop	Carin-Anne Greco	December 7, 2012	1.81	
44	19	"Cubby's Pet Problem"	Howy Parkins	Don Gillies	Sharon Forward, Kirk Hanson, and Rossen Varbanov	December 7, 2012	1.81	
Bucky is covered up with barnacles, so Jake and his crew cure him with a "Zebra Rose" while Captain Hook on the other hand, misunderstands this thinking that he wants that for his crush Red Jessica. Guest star: Jane Kaczmarek as Red Jessica A baby sea serpent named Slink follows the crew home to Pirate Island, so Cubby must return him to his mother but first he needs to get him back from Captain Hook who plans to use him for his own zoo. Guest star: Allisyn Ashley Arm as Stormy the Mermaid Song: Bubbly Blue
45	20	"Hook's Hookity-Hook!"	Howy Parkins	Story by : Mark Drop; Written by : Brian Swenlin	Kelly James	January 25, 2013	1.86	
45	20	"Hooked Together!"	Howy Parkins	Story by : Earl Kress and Mark Drop; Written by : Mark Drop	Dave Williams	January 25, 2013	1.86	
Captain Hook invents the "Swiss Army Hook", an all-in-one hook, but it starts going haywire. Jake and his crew meanwhile, are searching for the treasure of the palms. Jake and Captain Hook are both chained up on chain-cuffs, so their crews must help them get free by finding the Never Key that opens any lock. Song: Hook’s Hooks
46	21	"Cubby's Mixed-Up Map"	Howy Parkins	Mark Drop	Bob Foster	March 1, 2013	2.07	
46	21	"Jake's Cool New Matey!"	Howy Parkins	Don Gillies	Stark Howell and Rob Lilly	March 1, 2013	2.07	
Captain Hook switches Cubby's map with a fake one to keep Jake and his crew from finding their way to Thumbs-Up Mountain to find the Golden Dinghy. Jake and his crew help Percy the Penguin to find the legendary paradise where winter lasts all year long. Guest star: Rhys Darby as Percy the Penguin Song: Pirate Island Hideout
47	22	"Jake's Birthday Bash!"	Howy Parkins	Story by : Brian Swenlin; Teleplay by : Don Gillies and Brian Swenlin	Kirk Hanson and Carin-Anne Greco	March 22, 2013	1.85	
47	22	"The Lighthouse Diamond"	Howy Parkins	Mark Drop	Rob Lilly	March 22, 2013	1.85	
Izzy, Cubby, and Skully throw a birthday party for Jake with a very special birthday treasure hunt. Guest stars: Tori Spelling as Pirate Princess, Lisa Loeb as Winger, Josh Duhamel as Captain Flynn, Ariel Winter as Marina the Mermaid, and Allisyn Ashley Arm as Stormy the Mermaid When Captain Hook steals the lighthouse diamond, Jake and his crew must get it back before Red Jessica sails right past Pirate Island. Guest star: Jane Kaczmarek as Red Jessica Song: Belay
48	23	"Tiki Tree Luau!"	Howy Parkins	Mark Drop	Rob Lilly and Bob Foster	April 19, 2013	1.70	
48	23	"Captain Who?"	Howy Parkins	Story by : Mark Drop; Written by : Brian Swenlin	Kirk Hanson	April 19, 2013	1.70	
Jake and his crew are invited to attend the Tiki Tree Luau to welcome spring. Before the festival, they take care of Baby Tiki Trees. Captain Hook and his crew come in disguised as Baby Tiki Trees, so Jake and his crew decide to mess with them. After smelling Forget-Me Flowers, Captain Hook loses his memory. So Mr. Smee ask Jake and his crew for help to make Captain Hook remember. Song: The Jolly Roger (tune taken from Jake Saves Bucky)
49	24	"Ahoy, Captain Smee!"	Howy Parkins	Mark Drop	Bob Foster	May 10, 2013	N/A	
49	24	"Cap'n Croak!"	Howy Parkins	Brian Swenlin	Stark Howell	May 10, 2013	N/A	
After saving the Jolly Roger, Mr. Smee shocks Captain Hook that he will be captain for a while much to Hook's dismay. When Bones does his magic tricks, he thinks he accidentally made Captain Hook turn into a frog, although Hook was just stuck on sticky vines. Guest star: Tiffani Thiessen as Misty the Wonderful Witch Song: The Jolly Roger
50	25	"The Mystery Pirate!"	Howy Parkins	Michael G. Stern	Dave Williams	May 24, 2013	N/A	
50	25	"Pirate Swap!"	Howy Parkins	Mark Drop	Kelly James	May 24, 2013	N/A	
There's a mystery pirate who steals Jake's sword and Captain Hook's hook. The Mystery Pirate reveals herself to be Captain Hook's mother, Mama Hook. Guest star: Sharon Osbourne as Mama Hook It's Pirate Swap Day, and Cubby and Bones switch places for the day. Song: Goodbye Crew
51	26	"Jake and Sneaky Le Beak!"	Howy Parkins	Brian Swenlin	Sharon Forward and Rob Lilly	June 14, 2013	N/A	
51	26	"Cubby the Brave"	Howy Parkins	Story by : Brian Swenlin and Mark Drop; Written by : Mark Drop	Carin-Anne Greco	June 14, 2013	N/A	
There's a sneaky French pirate named Beatrice Le Beak who steals things that belong to Captain Hook. Guest star: Teri Hatcher as Beatrice Le Beak Cubby finds a pair of boots and tries to face his fears by wearing the boots and calling them Boots of Bravery, unaware that the boots belong to Captain Hook. Song: Walkin' the Plank
52	27	"Pirate Genie-in-a-Bottle!"	Howy Parkins	Mark Seidenberg	Kelly James, Dave Williams, Kirk Hanson, and Rob Lilly	June 21, 2013	N/A	
When Jake picks up a ship-in-a-bottle, he releases a magical pirate genie who must find the Treasure Wishing Well in order to restore his powers. Captain Hook wants to capture Pip the Genie so that he wants to have his own treasure wishes come true. Guest star: Jerry O'Connell as Pip the Pirate Genie Song: Hammock
53	28	"Hook's Playful Plant!"	Howy Parkins	Mark Drop	Bob Foster, Kirk Hanson, Rob Lilly, and Kelly James	July 5, 2013	N/A	
53	28	"The Golden Smee"	Howy Parkins	Story by : Brian Swenlin; Written by : Don Gillies	Stark Howell and Rob Lilly	July 5, 2013	N/A	
Captain Hook uses a cologne that Red Jessica gave to him, but accidentally sprays a plant with it and the plant grows bigger. Guest star: Jane Kaczmarek as Red Jessica Jake's pirate puppy Patch digs up a golden statue that looks like Mr. Smee. But when Jake or Captain Hook holds that statue, they ended up nothing but Bad Luck. Song: Where the Rainbow Lands
54	29	"Follow the Bouncing Bumble!"	Howy Parkins	Michael G. Stern	Carin-Anne Greco and Kirk Hanson	July 19, 2013	N/A	
54	29	"Sandy and the Clams"	Howy Parkins	Don Gillies	Sharon Forward	July 19, 2013	N/A	
Captain Hook and his crew are in disguise trying to sneak into the Bouncing Bumbles's beehive and steal their treasure. Guest star: Rosie O'Donnell as the Bouncing Bumble Queen Sandy the Starfish and his singing clam trio put on a show, but Mr. Smee takes the clams thinking they are regular seashells, and uses them as decorations for Captain Hook's date with Red Jessica. Jake and his crew try to get the clams back, but Hook tries to stop them who misunderstands them thinking they want the pearl necklace he wants to give to Red Jessica. Guest stars: Ariel Winter as Marina, Allisyn Ashley Arm as Stormy, and Jane Kaczmarek as Red Jessica Song: Spyglass
55	30	"Sand Pirate Cubby!"	Howy Parkins	Michael G. Stern	Kirk Hanson and Carin-Anne Greco	July 26, 2013	N/A	
55	30	"Song of the Desert"	Howy Parkins	Brian Swenlin	Sharon Forward	July 26, 2013	N/A	
Cubby and Bones both audition to become Captain Flynn's sand pirates. Captain Hook tries to sneak into Captain Flynn's pyramid and steal the Golden Pirate Beetle while Jake and his crew are looking after the pyramid. Guest star: Josh Duhamel as Captain Flynn Song: Pirate Rock Recipe
56	31	"Jake's Special Delivery"	Howy Parkins	Brian Swenlin	Bob Foster and Stark Howell	August 9, 2013	N/A	
56	31	"Seahorse Saddle-Up"	Howy Parkins	Mark Drop	Stark Howell and Kirk Hanson	August 9, 2013	N/A	
In Never Land, Jake, Izzy, Cubby, and Skully discover a package washed up and try to deliver it to the right person before Captain Hook steals it. It turns out that the package was meant to be delivered to Captain Hook. Jake, Izzy, and Cubby participate in Marina's seahorse race. Captain Hook also joins in, riding a giant mechanical seahorse. Guest star: Ariel Winter as Marina the Mermaid Song: Pirate Mom
57	32	"Pirate Pals"	Howy Parkins	Brian Swenlin	Kelly James	August 16, 2013	N/A	
57	32	"Treasurefalls!"	Howy Parkins	Story by : Don Gillies; Written by : Mark Drop	Dave Williams and Carin-Anne Greco	August 16, 2013	N/A	
Captain Hook is skeptical when he finds out that Beatrice Le Beak and Red Jessica have become pals. Guest stars: Teri Hatcher as Beatrice Le Beak; Jane Kaczmarek as Red Jessica Cubby loses his treasured Skull-N-Bones marble, but in the process finds a map to Never Land's mythical Treasurefalls. The warning on treasurefalls says: do not take one treasure or you'll be trapped in there by the trees but Captain Hook ignored that warning until he got tricked by Jake by doing the opposite command. Song: Gold Doubloons
58	33	"Misty's Magical Mix-Up!"	Howy Parkins	Ashley Mendoza	Sharon Forward	October 4, 2013	N/A	
58	33	"Bones's Lucky Doubloon!"	Howy Parkins	Don Gillies	Carin-Anne Greco and Bob Foster	October 4, 2013	N/A	
Misty the Wonderful Witch accidentally turns herself back into the Evil Sea Witch and makes a deal with Captain Hook to keep Jake and his crew away from the Pirate Princess while she tries to turn the Pirate Princess into gold again. Jake and his crew must help the Pirate Princess return Misty to normal. Guest stars: Tori Spelling as Pirate Princess, Carol Kane as Sea Witch, and Tiffani Thiessen as Misty the Wonderful Witch Bones uses a lucky gold doubloon his dad gave to him and goes on a magical treasure hunt. Bones get good luck every time he flips it so Jake, Izzy, Cubby, and Skully, joined Bones on a treasure hunt for Queen Hippolita's treasure while Captain Hook ends up always getting bad luck from Bones's Bloony. Guest star: Tiffani Thiessen as the Mermaids Song: Gold Doubloons
59	34	"Jake's Royal Rescue"	Howy Parkins	Don Gillies	Kirk Hanson, Rob Lilly, Sharon Forward, and Dave Williams	November 3, 2013	2.62	
Captain Hook kidnaps Queen Coralie, the mermaid ruler of Neptune City. Guest stars: Leigh-Allyn Baker as Queen Coralie, Ariel Winter as Marina the Mermaid, and Allisyn Ashley Arm as Stormy the Mermaid Song: Bubbly Blue
60	35	"F-F-Frozen Never Land!"	Howy Parkins	Mark Drop	Stark Howell, Kirk Hanson, Dave Williams, Kelly James, and Sharon Forward	December 6, 2013	N/A	
60	35	"Little Stinkers"	Howy Parkins	Story by : Don Gillies; Written by : Mark Drop and Brian Swenlin	Bob Foster	December 6, 2013	N/A	
A blizzard strikes Never Land and Skully catches a cold, so Jake, Izzy, and Cubby cure him with Fire Red Rubies. Guest star: Rhys Darby as Percy the Penguin Captain Hook discovers a bad smell and it's coming from Bones's new pet, the stinky Skunk Bug. He tells him to get rid of it at once to discard it to Pirate Island forcing Jake, Izzy, Cubby and Skully to find a home for the stinky creature. They say that Stink-Pot Swamp is a perfect home for the stinky Skunk Bug. But soon realizes that the song in that swamp (similar to Sharky and Bones singing that song) causes the skunk bugs to dance and multiply. Later, Mr. Smee makes codfish stew with bugs in it and Izzy uses her pixie dust to put them to the same place where the crew drop the Skunk Bug off leading insects to their new home, Far Far Away Island. Song: Pirate Rock Recipe
61	36	"Jake's Never Land Rescue"	Howy Parkins	Mark Seidenberg	Stark Howell, Dave Williams, Sharon Forward, Carin-Anne Anderson, and Thomas Morgan	September 29, 2013	2.24	
While Jake's crew is having lunch, and after saying, "Never Land Forever!", his sword mysteriously vanishes. The crew learns from Fairy Rock that Never Land is in danger of disappearing forever. The crew begins their quest to save Never Land. While the crew is on their adventure, Izzy's pixie dust and the pictures on Cubby's map vanish as well. When all hope seems lost, a mysterious guardian appears to Jake, Izzy, and Cubby, and tells them that a quest must be completed in order to save it. The crew is willing to take on the challenge, but the guardian says only one of them can save Never Land. Jake decides to take on the quest, and taking Izzy's pixie dust and Cubby's map with him, sets off to find and restore the magical Forever Tree, the power of which sustains all of Never Land. Izzy, Cubby and Skully return to Pirate Island, they discover that Captain Hook and his crew are on Pirate Island digging up the place looking for treasure. Izzy, Cubby, and Skully do everything they can to stop Captain Hook. Meanwhile, Jake follows a small flying light as he completes his quest. First, he goes to the almost-empty Fountain of Forever and gets more pixie dust. Then following the little light to Mermaid Lagoon, Jake learns from Marina and Stormy, that the magical ink from the Golden Squid will restore Cubby's map. When Jake gets to the door to the Forever Tree, he uses a medallion the guardian gave him to open the door. He gets a new golden sword from the old tree, and then the tree disappears. Meanwhile, the rest of Jake's crew has finally gotten rid of Captain Hook, just in time for the small flying light to find them and lead them to Jake and the guardian, who need their help to make a new Forever Tree grow. They scream, "Yo Ho, Forever Tree Grow!" continuously, and a new Forever Tree grows, the magic is restored, everything reappears, and Never Land is saved. The guardian reveals himself to be Peter Pan, and the small flying light is revealed to be Tinker Bell. Peter Pan gives Jake the power to fly without pixie dust and invites Jake to explore the worlds beyond Never Land. Jake wants to bring the rest of his crew, but only he can go because he completed the quest. He says his final goodbyes to his crew and goes with Peter Pan, and the crew goes back to Pirate Island. While flying with Peter Pan, Jake has a feeling that his crew may need him and goes back to Pirate Island. Captain Hook has returned, trapped Izzy, Cubby, and Skully in a cage, and taken their Team Treasure Chest. Jake then frees his mates, but Captain Hook traps Tinker Bell and uses her pixie dust on his ship to fly away. Jake and his ship, Bucky, chase after Hook. Peter Pan frees Tinker Bell, while Bucky shoots a water cannon at Hook's ship to make him stop flying. Jake's crew and Peter Pan do, however, forgive Hook's crew for trying to steal Jake's treasure. Peter Pan still invites Jake to explore the worlds beyond Never Land with him, but Jake decides to stay in Never Land and Pirate Island with the rest of his crew, because they are not just shipmates, teammates, or even friends, but they are a family. Peter Pan agrees saying it was meant to be. "Never Land Rescue" ends with Peter Pan making gold doubloons fall from the sky and they have the crew's faces on them. Guest stars: Adam Wylie as Peter Pan, Ariel Winter as Marina, and Allisyn Ashley Arm as Stormy Song: Pirate Island Hideout (extended version)

=== Season 3 (2014–15) ===
On February 13, 2012, the same day "Peter Pan Returns" (the final episode of Season 1) aired, the series was renewed for a third season. The third season premiered on January 3, 2014. The opening sequence of this season was changed.

No. overall	No. in season	Title	Directed by	Written by	Storyboard by	Original release date	Prod. code	US viewers (millions)
62	1	"Treasure of the Pirate Mummy's Tomb"	Howy Parkins	Mark Drop	Bob Foster	January 3, 2014	2.65	
62	1	"Mystery of the Missing Treasure!"	Howy Parkins	Ashley Mendoza	Dave Williams	January 3, 2014	2.65	
Jake's crew help Captain Flynn find the Never Land ankh, located inside Wander the pirate mummy's tomb, so he can remove his ship, the Barracuda, from a sand dune. But Captain Hook wants the ankh for himself. Guest stars: Jack McBrayer as Pirate Mummy and Josh Duhamel as Captain Flynn Jake and his friends search for the thief who has suspiciously stolen their Team Treasure Chest from Pirate Island. The thief is revealed to be Beatrice Le Beak. Guest stars: Teri Hatcher as Beatrice Le Beak and Jane Kaczmarek as Red Jessica Song: Swamp Stomp
63	2	"Invisible Jake"	Howy Parkins	Mark Drop	Stark Howell	January 10, 2014	1.66	
63	2	"Who's a Pretty Bird?"	Howy Parkins	Kelly Ward	Carin-Anne Anderson	January 10, 2014	1.66	
Jake and his crew discover an interesting ring and use it to turn themselves invisible. They try to keep Captain Hook from stealing it. When Skully gets a mirror as a gift, he can't stop admiring his own reflection while Jake, Izzy, and Cubby found out that all the big booms were actually Captain Hook's plan on making his own monument on Butterfly Bluff. Song: Sea Legs
64	3	"Captain Gizmo"	Howy Parkins	Story by : Thomas Hart; Written by : Kelly Ward	Carin-Anne Anderson	January 17, 2014	1.73	
64	3	"Jake's Pirate Swap Meet"	Howy Parkins	Brian Swenlin	Sharon Forward	January 17, 2014	1.73	
Jake and his crew construct a mechanical pirate named Captain Gizmo. Just then, Captain Hook decides to use Captain Gizmo to get the treasure in Belch Mountain but Jake and his crew managed to foil his plans. Jake accidentally swaps Cubby's first map to Captain Hook. And Cubby's treasure is revealed to be his doll Captain Coconut. Song: Lead the Way Jake
65	4	"Pirate Genie Tales"	Howy Parkins	Don Gillies	Dave Williams and Sharon Forward	January 24, 2014	1.68	
Jake and his mates gather around the campfire to hear Pip the Pirate Genie share fabulous tales of his travels around the Never World. Guest star: Jerry O'Connell as Pip the Pirate Genie Song: Codfish Reel
66	5	"Cubby's Crabby Crusade"	Howy Parkins	Michael G. Stern	Stark Howell	January 31, 2014	1.56	
66	5	"The Never Sands of Time"	Howy Parkins	Brian Swenlin	Dave Williams	January 31, 2014	1.56	
When Cubby plays around pretending to be Jake, a bunch of crabs, thinking he really is Jake, kidnap him, take him to King Crab's Island, and ask him to stop Captain Hook from stealing their most precious treasure, The Golden Claw. Guest stars: Bobby Moynihan as King Crab and Rob De Luca as one of the crabs Night and day are mixed up thanks to Captain Hook messing with the legendary Never Sands of Time. Guest stars: Ariel Winter as Marina the Mermaid and Allisyn Ashley Arm as Stormy the Mermaid Song: Tiki Tree Limbo
67	6	"Trouble on the High Sneeze"	Howy Parkins	Brian Swenlin	Stark Howell	February 7, 2014	1.74	
67	6	"Pirate-Sitting Pirates"	Howy Parkins	Melinda LaRose	Kelly James	February 7, 2014	1.74	
When Pip the Pirate Genie's incessant sneezing affects his ability to do magic, Jake and his mates set out to find him a cure. Guest star: Jerry O'Connell as Pip the Pirate Genie Jake, Izzy, Cubby, Captain Hook, and Tick Tock Croc all transform into babies after falling into the Pirate Pool of Youth, so Skully, Mr. Smee, Sharky, and Bones try to find the Grandfather Gladiola flower to transform them back to normal but despite the small size, Captain Hook only wants himself to become big. Song: Codfish Reel
68	7	"Smee-erella!"	Howy Parkins	Melinda LaRose	Stark Howell and Carin-Anne Anderson	February 14, 2014	2.29	
After being transformed into the dashing, swashbuckling "Buck Buccaneer" by Pip the Pirate Genie, Mr. Smee attends Red Jessica's Pirate Convention and befriends a special pirate woman named Mollie who's been assisting Red Jessica with the festivities while Captain Hook envies him and tries many attempts to foil Buck. The magic only lasts when all 3 air horns are blown then Buck will be reverted to Mr. Smee including the Jolly Roger that Pip shrinks back to a big ship. Guest stars: Jane Kaczmarek as Red Jessica, Jerry O'Connell as Pip the Pirate Genie, and Melissa Rauch as Red Jessica's first mate Mollie Song: Codfish Reel Note 1: Mickey Mouse Clubhouse aired a similar episode, titled “Minnie-rella” on the same day. Note 2: This is the first episode where Sean Ryan Fox voices Jake.
69	8	"The Never Land Coconut Cook-off"	Howy Parkins	Mark Drop	Carin-Anne Anderson, Kirk Hanson and Thomas Morgan	February 21, 2014	1.46	
69	8	"The Lost and Found Treasure"	Howy Parkins	Don Gillies	Kirk Hanson	February 21, 2014	1.46	
Captain Hook uses one of Misty the Wonderful Witch's magical recipes to create a giant coconut soufflé monster. The monster attacks Captain Hook and his crew and leaves them in a gooey mess. Then, he grabs Izzy and takes her to Belch Mountain. So Jake, Cubby and Misty try to rescue her. Guest star: Tiffani Thiessen as Misty the Wonderful Witch Jake and his mates journey to the Valley of the Lost to find Cubby's missing map. It turns out that all the lost things we're actually stolen by a magpie especially the Jade Jaguar that Captain Hook tries to get. Song: Sea Legs
70	9	"Hideout…It's Hook!"	Howy Parkins	Thomas Hart	Dave Williams	February 28, 2014	1.75	
70	9	"Tick Tock Traps"	Howy Parkins	Mark Drop	Kelly James	February 28, 2014	1.75	
When the kids's hideout is in danger of self-destructing, Jake and his crew must evacuate the hideout for good and try to flush Captain Hook out when he makes his way into it. Guest star: Ryan Kwanten as Brewster the Beast Trapper Captain Hook tricks Brewster the Beast Trapper to capture Tick Tock Croc. When Jake and his crew overhears this, they go and try to convince Brewster that Tick Tock Crock isn't a monster. Song: Yo Ho Mateys (Ship Hop) Away
71	10	"Play it Again, Cubby!"	Howy Parkins	Don Gillies	Stark Howell and Kirk Hanson	April 1, 2014	1.35	
71	10	"Trading Treasures"	Howy Parkins	Story by : Brian Swenlin; Written by : Ashley Mendoza	Stark Howell	April 1, 2014	1.35	
Jake, Izzy, Cubby, Skully, Percy the Penguin, and Princess Winger try to find out the lyrics of a song that has been spreading across Never Land. The song is revealed to be a cry for help from Sandy the Starfish. Meanwhile, Captain Hook tries out different camouflage techniques. Guest stars: Rhys Darby as Percy the Penguin and Lisa Loeb as Winger Queen Coralie is hosting a dance party, but cannot start it without a Golden Glam Shell, which has been taken by an octopus, so the pirate kids trade a necklace that Izzy made to The Pirate Princess for one of her diamonds, which is then traded to the octopus for the Glam Shell. Guest stars: Leigh-Allyn Baker as Queen Coralie and Tori Spelling as Pirate Princess Song: Sea Legs
72	11	"The Singing Stones"	Howy Parkins	Mark Drop	Sharon Forward	April 11, 2014	1.35	
72	11	"The Mermaid Queen's Voice"	Howy Parkins	Ashley Mendoza	Sharon Forward	April 11, 2014	1.35	
Jake and his crew try to help a family of singing stones return home Singing Stones Island on time before Peter Pan's comet arrives. Guest stars: Jim Cummings as Chief, Russi Taylor as Queen, Kenton Duty as Big Brother and Landry Bender as Little Sister Jake and his crew get some water from Fa-La-La Falls to cure Queen Coralie after she loses her voice right before a big concert begins. Captain Hook tries to prevent this so that he can have his own concert, but Mama Hook, Queen Coralie being one of her pals, persuades Hook otherwise. Guest stars: Leigh-Allyn Baker as Queen Coralie, Ariel Winter as Marina the Mermaid and Sharon Osbourne as Mama Hook Song: Ahoy Ahoy
73	12	"Where's Mama Hook?"	Howy Parkins	Ashley Mendoza	Bob Foster	May 9, 2014	1.60	
73	12	"Captain Hook's New Hobby"	Howy Parkins	Sharon Soboil	Kelly James	May 9, 2014	1.60	
Mama Hook heads off to Peaceful Valley for jasmine leaves, but she uses the wrong map and ends up going to Deep Dark Valley instead. So, Jake and Captain Hook's crew try to find her. When Mama Hook wants Captain Hook to find a hobby, everyone pitches in to help him find the perfect pastime. Guest star: Sharon Osbourne as Mama Hook Song: X
74	13	"Bucky's Treasure Hunt"	Howy Parkins	Don Gillies	Carin-Anne Anderson	June 27, 2014	2.03	
74	13	"Cubby's Tall Tale"	Howy Parkins	Story by : Thomas Hart; Written by : Mark Drop	Kelly James	June 27, 2014	2.03	
Bucky turns into Burrowing Bucky and tunnels underground to help Jake and crew recover the Treasure Bright, a powerful ship's lantern. When Cubby tells Captain Flynn and the gang a tall tale about buried treasure, Captain Hook overhears and sets off to find it. Guest stars: Josh Duhamel as Captain Flynn Song: Never Bugs
75	14	"Hook's Treasure Nap"	Howy Parkins	Story by : Thomas Hart; Written by : Ashley Mendoza	Bob Foster	July 4, 2014	1.89	
75	14	"Princess Power!"	Howy Parkins	Brian Swenlin	Carin-Anne Anderson	July 4, 2014	1.89	
Captain Hook forgets where he buried his teddy bear's toy pirate ship, but he remembers when he's asleep and dreaming. The Pirate Princess and Princess Winger name Izzy an honorary princess and they search for a Princess Treasure. Guest stars: Tori Spelling as Pirate Princess and Lisa Loeb as Winger Song: Codfish Reel
76	15	"Nanny Nell"	Howy Parkins	Mark Drop	Sharon Forward	September 5, 2014	2.01	
76	15	"Izzy and the Sea-Unicorn"	Howy Parkins	Thomas Hart	Sharon Forward	September 5, 2014	2.01	
Nanny Nell arrives to help Captain Hook make the Jolly Roger ship-shape. Mr. Smee becomes depressed when Nanny Nell's on board thinking that Captain Hook doesn't need him anymore and then later Captain Hook mistakes a door that locked the monster with 100 tentacles for a giant gold doubloon and accidentally releases the monster so Jake and his crew, together with Smee, must save the Jolly Roger and reseal the monster. Guest star: Jo Frost as Nanny Nell Izzy makes friends with a sea unicorn, only for Captain Hook to kidnap it. Guest stars: Allisyn Ashley Arm as Stormy and Leigh-Allyn Baker as Queen Coralie Song: Starfish Serenade
77	16	"Hook the Genie!"	Howy Parkins	Brian Swenlin	Bob Foster	September 12, 2014	1.67	
77	16	"A Royal Misunderstanding"	Howy Parkins	Don Gillies	Kelly James	September 12, 2014	1.67	
Hook turns into a genie after stealing a magic lamp. Guest star: Jerry O'Connell as Pip the Pirate Genie King Crab is holding a crab race the same time and place as Queen Coralie's water ballet, so Jake and his crew convince them to share the venue. Unfortunately, Captain Hook is also having a picnic with Red Jessica at the same spot and tries to ruin both events. Too bad, Captain Hook made a mistake at the end because he thought he wants to be alone with Red Jessica but turns out she wants to watch the Crab's race and the mermaid water ballet with Hook. Guest stars: Jane Kaczmarek as Red Jessica, Ariel Winter as Marina the Mermaid, Leigh-Allyn Baker as Queen Coralie and Bobby Moynihan as King Crab Song: Starfish Serenade
78	17	"Pirate Pogo!"	Howy Parkins	Mark Drop	Dave Williams	September 19, 2014	1.79	
78	17	"The Sneaky Snook-Off"	Howy Parkins	Story by : Brian Swenlin; Written by : Mark Drop	Sharon Forward	September 19, 2014	1.79	
Jake's crew and Captain Hook's crew do a dance called Pirate Pogo Dancing and try to find the lost treasure of the legendary pirate pogo rocker Captain Ramone. Captain Hook and Beatrice Le Beak compete to see who is the sneakiest pirate in Never Land. Guest star: Teri Hatcher as Beatrice Le Beak Song: Pirate Pogo
79	18	"Sleeping Mermaid"	Howy Parkins	Don Gillies	Tom Morgan	September 26, 2014	1.01	
79	18	"Jake's Mega-Mecha Sword"	Howy Parkins	Mark Drop	Dave Williams	September 26, 2014	1.01	
Jake and his crew force Captain Hook to help Queen Coralie, who has been cast under a magical sleeping spell. Guest stars: Leigh-Allyn Baker as Queen Coralie and Ariel Winter as Marina the Mermaid Jake's crew is running the Belch Mountain Parkour Race, but not before Jake finds the Mega-Mecha Sword, a legendary device with mechanical features and when Izzy says "It's legendary", Hook attempts to steal the Mega-Mecha Sword. The Mega-Mecha Sword has a Whirley Blade, a built-in compass, and it can transform into a pogo stick. When Captain Hook steals the mega-mecha blade, Jake now understands that even though the mega-mecha sword is legendary, his wooden sword is more special because Peter Pan made it for him as proof of his leadership. Song: Lead the Way Jake
80	19	"Pirate Ghost Story"	Howy Parkins	Mark Drop	Kelly James	October 3, 2014	1.28	
80	19	"Queen Izzy-bella"	Howy Parkins	Melinda LaRose	Bob Foster	October 3, 2014	1.28	
Spooky love is in the air when Jake and his crew help ghost pirate Treasure Tooth find his ghostly gal, Peg-Leg Peg. Guest stars: Estelle Harris as Peg-Leg Peg and Carl Reiner as Captain Treasure Tooth Thanks to a magical book, Izzy becomes a legendary pirate-adventurer, Queen Issabella and helps the Queen find the treasure in Never Land's Valley of Ice revealed to be ice golden dragon eggs and an ice dragon mother. Song: Ahoy Ahoy Note: This is the last episode where Cameron Boyce voices Jake due to hitting puberty and going back to playing Luke Ross in the Disney Channel original series Jessie.
81	20	"Jake the Wolf"	Howy Parkins	Thomas Hart	Sharon Forward	October 10, 2014	1.46	
81	20	"Witch Hook"	Howy Parkins	Ashley Mendoza	Bob Foster	October 10, 2014	1.46	
Jake turns into a wolf under the full moon when he inadvertently disobeys the warning written on a gem. The Sea Witch's magic mirror turns Captain Hook into a witch, and Hook uses his new powers to turn Jake into a coward. Guest star: Tiffani Thiessen as Misty the Wonderful Witch Song: Never Bugs
82	21	"Battle for the Book!"	Howy Parkins	Mark Seidenberg and Brian Swenlin	Carin-Anne Anderson, Bob Foster, Kirk Hanson, Stark Howell and Kelly James	October 26, 2014	1.92	
Michael and John love hearing Wendy's stories about Never Land, especially when Peter Pan outsmarts Captain Hook. But the sneaky snook Hook hates to look like a bumbling fool, so he flies to London, steals Wendy's storybook, and sets off to destroy her stories once and for all. Peter Pan sends Jake, Izzy, Cubby, Skully, and Tinker Bell to London to help Wendy, John, and Michael find Hook and retrieve Wendy's book. Unfortunately, without the book, Wendy, John, and Michael start to forget the stories and their adventures on Never Land. Soon, Captain Hook also forgets about the book. Eventually, Peter Pan finally arrives and joins the quest. Later, Wendy convinces Hook that, in the stories, he is the greatest villain of all, and Hook decides not to destroy the book and gives it back to Wendy, because that's what the final battle started with. Guest stars: Maia Mitchell as Wendy Darling, Adam Wylie as Peter Pan, Elliot Reeve as John Darling, Colby Mulgrew as Michael Darling, and Leigh-Allyn Baker as Queen Coralie Note: This is the first episode where Jadon Sand voices Cubby. This is also the first episode where Riley Thomas Stewart voices Jake.
83	22	"Mer-Matey Ahoy!"	Howy Parkins	Brian Swenlin	Stark Howell	November 14, 2014	1.01	
83	22	"Pirate Pinball"	Howy Parkins	Don Gillies	Carin-Anne Anderson	November 14, 2014	1.01	
Jake helps Finn the Mer-Boy to stop an electric eel from causing Never Land into a storm. Captain Hook on the other hand, wants Finn's trident for his own plan. Guest star: Tyrel Jackson Williams as Finn the Mer-Boy Jake and his crew take their challenge in a life-sized pinball game in order to find a hidden treasure. Captain Hook and his crew also join in. Song: Buccaneer Bike Ride
84	23	"ShiverJack"	Howy Parkins	Thomas Hart	Kelly James	November 21, 2014	1.05	
84	23	"Treasure Tunnel Trouble"	Howy Parkins	Story by : Thomas Hart; Written by : Thomas Hart, Mark Drop, and Brian Swenlin	Bob Foster	November 21, 2014	1.05	
Jake and his crew help Captain Frost to stop ShiverJack from turning Never Land into ice. Guest star: Harland Williams as Captain Frost, Mark Hamill as ShiverJack and Josh Duhamel as Captain Flynn Captain Hook swipes the treasure from Bones's bug friends, the Buddybops. Song: Never Bugs Note: This is the first episode where Megan Richie voices Izzy.
85	24	"Grandpa Bones"	Howy Parkins	Don Gillies	Dave Williams	November 26, 2014	1.62	
85	24	"The Arctic Pearl"	Howy Parkins	Brian Swenlin	Bob Foster	November 26, 2014	1.62	
Bones's grandfather Captain Buzzard visits Pirate Island to lead Jake and his crew to find treasure. Guest star: Rob Paulsen as Captain Buzzard Bones Jake and his crew help Percy the Penguin to find his best friend Pearl. Guest stars: Rhys Darby as Percy the Penguin and Melanie Lynskey as Pearl the Penguin Song: X
86	25	"Captain Scrooge"	Howy Parkins	Thomas Hart	Naz Ghodrati-Azadi and Kirk Hanson	December 5, 2014	1.42	
In this variation of Charles Dickens' A Christmas Carol, Captain Treasure Tooth visits Captain Scrooge (Captain Hook) and takes him through time. Guest stars: Carl Reiner as Captain Treasure Tooth, Sharon Osbourne as Mama Hook, Jane Kaczmarek as Red Jessica, and Josh Duhamel as Captain Flynn Song: Yo Ho Holiday
87	26	"Jake's Awesome Surprise"	Howy Parkins	Thomas Hart	Stark Howell	December 12, 2014	1.12	
87	26	"Aye, Aye Cap'n-Cap'n!"	Howy Parkins	Don Gillies	Carin-Anne Anderson	December 12, 2014	1.12	
Izzy, Cubby, and Skully set out to find a special birthday treasure for Jake, but when the treasure map ends up in Bones's hands, Hook's crew also goes after it. Guest stars: Jack McBrayer as Pirate Mummy, Josh Duhamel as Captain Flynn, Jerry O'Connell as Pip the Pirate Genie, Mae Whitman as Tinker Bell, and Adam Wylie as Peter Pan When Sharky and Bones are left in charge of the Jolly Roger, Jake and his crew must help the two captains get along. Guest stars: Sharon Osbourne as Mama Hook Song: Birthday Buccaneer
88	27	"Captain Frost"	Howy Parkins	Ted Elliott and Terry Rossio	Dave Williams	December 13, 2014	1.22	
88	27	"The Legendary Snow-Foot!"	Howy Parkins	Don Gillies and Brian Swenlin	Dave Williams	December 13, 2014	1.22	
Jake helps a visitor from the frozen Never North, Captain Frost, find a magical gem after it is stolen by Captain Hook. Guest stars: Harland Williams as Captain Frost, Ariel Winter as Marina the Mermaid and Tori Spelling as Pirate Princess Jake and his crew help their pal Percy set off in search of the legendary Snow-Foot, a boy-yeti with really big feet. Guest stars: Rhys Darby as Percy the Penguin and Rico Rodriguez as Snow-Foot Song: Codfish Reel
89	28	"Look Out...Never-Sharks!"	Howy Parkins	Don Gillies	Sharon Forward	December 15, 2014	1.40	
89	28	"The Monkey Pirate King"	Howy Parkins	Thomas Hart	Dave Williams	December 15, 2014	1.40	
Finn the Mer-Boy takes Jake on an underwater excursion to go Wreck Racing with his old friend Smiley the Never Shark. Guest star: Tyrel Jackson Williams as Finn the Mer-Boy The Monkey Pirate King Zongo and his crew take over Jake's Hideout. Guest star: Chris Kattan as King Zongo Song: Lead the Way Jake
90	29	"Stowaway Ghosts!"	Howy Parkins	Mark Drop	Kelly James	December 16, 2014	1.32	
90	29	"Happy 1,000th Birthday!"	Howy Parkins	Mark Drop	Bob Foster	December 16, 2014	1.32	
Jake and his mates help Captain Hook after he accidentally releases three prankster ghosts who vow to never leave the Jolly Roger. Guest stars: Estelle Harris as Peg-Leg Peg, Carl Reiner as Captain Treasure Tooth and Bill Farmer as Ghostly Bob Note: This is the last episode where Jonathan Morgan Heit voices Cubby due to hitting puberty. Jake and the crew are celebrating Wander the Pirate Mummy's 1,000th birthday, but when Hook hijacks his special birthday surprise, a new sand ship, Pirate Mummy Wander must use Jake's birthday gift to reclaim it. Guest star: Jack McBrayer as Wander the Pirate Mummy Song: Bootbuckle Note: This is the last episode where Madison Pettis voices Izzy due to hitting puberty.
91	30	"Flight of the Feathers"	Howy Parkins	Brian Swenlin	Kelly James	December 17, 2014	1.40	
91	30	"Captain Hookity-Hook!"	Howy Parkins	Brian Swenlin	Bob Foster	December 17, 2014	1.40	
Skully is joining the Feathered Four on their 100th mission when their leader's wing got sprained. Guest stars: Adam West as Wise Old Parrot, Teri Hatcher as Beatrice Le Beak, James Arnold Taylor as Top Bird, Chloe Bennet as Swifty, Nestor Carbonell as Eagle-Eye, and Brett Dalton as Talon Captain Hookity-Hook is trying to steal Captain Hook's treasure map. To retrieve it, Jake and his crew ask Captain Gizmo for help. Song: Buccaneer Bike Ride
92	31	"Dread the Evil Genie"	Howy Parkins	Thomas Hart	Kirk Hanson and Stark Howell	July 6, 2015	1.53	
92	31	"Sandblast"	Howy Parkins	Mark Seidenberg	Carin-Anne Anderson	July 6, 2015	1.53	
There's an evil pirate genie who attempts to kidnap Pip the Pirate Genie. Guest stars: David Tennant as Dread the Evil Genie and Jerry O'Connell as Pip the Pirate Genie Jake, Captain Hook and Captain Flynn are racing together in their sand wagons in the Never Land Desert to see who gets the treasure 1st. However, Flynn and Hook's rivalry goes too far and nearly endangered the trio. Guest star: Josh Duhamel as Captain Flynn Song: Pirate Pogo
93	32	"Tiki Maskerade Mystery"	Howy Parkins	Mark Drop	Sharon Forward	July 13, 2015	1.43	
93	32	"The Tale of Ratsputin"	Howy Parkins	Don Gillies	Dave Williams	July 20, 2015	1.23	
Jake and Captain Hook are teaming up to catch a thief when the Golden Tiki was stolen during the Tiki Maskerade. Guest star: Jane Kaczmarek as Red Jessica, Josh Duhamel as Captain Flynn and Teri Hatcher as Beatrice Le Beak Jake and his crew are looking for a creature named Ratsputin. Guest star: Ryan Kwanten as Brewster the Beast Trapper, Ariel Winter as Marina the Mermaid and Allisyn Ashley Arm as Stormy the Mermaid Song: Tiki Tree Limbo
94	33	"Captain Buzzard to the Rescue!"	Howy Parkins	Don Gillies	Carin-Anne Anderson	July 27, 2015	1.43	
94	33	"Croctastrophy!"	Howy Parkins	Mark Drop	Stark Howell	July 27, 2015	1.43	
Captain Buzzard tries to rescue Sharky, Bones and Mr. Smee after they are captured by a Minotaur. It is revealed that the Minotaur was Buzzard's matey, Monty the Minotaur. Guest stars: Rob Paulsen as Captain Buzzard Bones and Jim Cummings as Monty Some baby crocodiles mistakes Captain Hook as their father for stealing golden eggs. So Jake and his crew must find Nanny Nell and the mama crocodile who got caught in a net thanks to Captain Hook. Guest star: Jo Frost as Nanny Nell Song: Swamp Stomp
95	34	"Captain Jake and the Never Land Pirates: The Great Never Sea Conquest!"	Howy Parkins	Mark Seidenberg	Carin-Anne Anderson, Naz Ghodrati-Azadi, Sharon Forward, Kelly James, Kirk Hanson, and Dave Williams	September 12, 2015	1.68	
Jake brings together the greatest Never Sea captains to battle an evil mer-wizard named Lord Fathom who tries to take over the sea by awakening a legendary three-headed serpent called the Strake. In order to fight Lord Fathom Jake and all the Captains found the Mighty Colossus and used that ship. But they needed a captain so they chose Jake to be the Captain of the Mighty Colossus. Guest stars: Josh Duhamel as Captain Flynn, Harland Williams as Captain Frost, Teri Hatcher as Beatrice Le Beak, Leigh-Allyn Baker as Queen Coralie, Ariel Winter as Marina, Allisyn Ashley Arm as Stormy, Malcolm McDowell as Lord Fathom, Jim Rash as Sinker, and Kevin Michael Richardson as King Neptune Note: This is the last episode to air before Season 4, which continues where the special episode left off. This is also the last episode where Sean Ryan Fox voices Jake.

=== Season 4: Captain Jake and the Never Land Pirates (2015–16) ===
On January 8, 2014, Disney ordered a fourth and final season titled Captain Jake and the Never Land Pirates. Like season 3, the opening sequence was changed, introducing new rhythm and images.

No. overall	No. in season	Title	Directed by	Written by	Storyboard by	Original release date	Prod. code	US viewers (millions)
96	1	"Into the Heart of Coldness"	Jeff Gordon	Don Gillies	Dave Williams	October 17, 2015	1.50	
96	1	"The Remarkable Beardini!"	Broni Likomanov	Don Gillies	Naz Ghodrati-Azadi	October 17, 2015	1.50	
Captain Jake and his crew must save the penguins from evil wizard ShiverJack's fortress where it happened in Chilly Canyon. Guest star: Mark Hamill as ShiverJack, Rhys Darby, as Percy the Penguin, and Melanie Lynskey as Pearl the Penguin The Remarkable Beardini is free from the chest from Captain Hook and he is very surprised that Captain Jake took his invisibility ring. Guest star: Steve Valentine as The Remarkable Beardini
97	2	"Escape from Ghost Island"	Jeff Gordon	Brian Swenlin	Kirk Hanson	October 17, 2015	1.50	
97	2	"The Island of Doctor Undergear"	Broni Likomanov	Brian Swenlin	Stark Howell	October 17, 2015	1.50	
Captain Hook and Mr. Smee turn into ghosts when they touch the ghost treasure. To make matters worse, a ghost captain named Captain Wraith turns Captain Jake into a ghost, Captain Jake must find a way to stop Captain Wraith before everyone remains a ghost forever. Guest star: Blair Underwood as Captain Wraith When Captain Gizmo is broken, Captain Jake and his crew set off to Doctor Undergear's island to find a golden cog for their mate, but is soon tricked by him by putting an evil cog into Captain Gizmo turning him into an underling for Doctor Undergear. Jake and his crew must find a way to get their mate back from Doctor Undergear's evil clutches. Guest star: Tony Hale as Doctor Undergear
98	3	"Rise of the Pirate Pharaoh"	Broni Likomanov	Mark Drop	Thomas Warren Morgan	October 17, 2015	1.72	
98	3	"The Golden Hook"	Jeff Gordon	Don Gillies	Philip Mosness	October 17, 2015	1.72	
When Captain Jake and his mates accidentally freed the Pirate Pharaoh, the Pharaoh goes to restore the Never Nile, but Jake and his mates misjudged the Pharaoh's actions for trying to cause trouble. Guest star: Aasif Mandvi as Pirate Pharaoh, Jack McBrayer as Pirate Mummy When Captain Hook found a golden hook, he accidentally turns Sharky and Bones into solid gold statues. To make matters worse, Captain Hook becomes a gold frenzy captain and plans to turn Never Land into solid gold, so Mr. Smee goes to Captain Jake and his crew for help to stop Captain Hook's frenzy.
99	4	"Mystery of the Mighty Colossus"	Broni Likomanov	Thomas Hart	Sharon Forward	October 24, 2015	1.72	
99	4	"The Doubloon Monsoon"	Jeff Gordon	Don Gillies	Kyle Menke	October 24, 2015	1.72	
Captain Colossus's ex-mate the Grim Buccaneer decides to abduct Captain Jake's crew and even Captain Hook's in an attempt to reclaim the Mighty Colossus, so Captain Jake must prevent the Grim Buccaneer from achieving his goal. Guest star: Christian Slater as Grim Buccaneer, Josh Duhamel as Captain Flynn, Jack McBrayer as Pirate Mummy Captain Hook, Mama Hook, Buzzard Bones, Bones, decide to have a race to see who reaches the Doubloon Monsoon 1st with Captain Jake and Skully teaming up to see it too. Guest star: Rob Paulsen as Captain Buzzard Bones and Sharon Osbourne as Mama Hook
100	5	"Shark Attack!"	Broni Likomanov	Brian Swenlin	Naz Ghordrati-Azadi	November 7, 2015	1.74	
100	5	"Captain Hook's Colossal Collision"	Jeff Gordon	Don Gillies	Dave Williams	November 7, 2015	1.74	
Dr. Undergear has returned and this time, he attempts to sink the Mighty Colossus by using his mecha shark and crab so that he can use the parts to make his own inventions together with a shark sword in his hand. Captain Jake and his crew must prevent Dr. Undergear and his inventions from trying to sink their ship. Guest star: Tony Hale as Doctor Undergear Captain Hook manages to steal the Mighty Colossus but when he accidentally broke a hidden lever, Captain Jake and his crew must stop the ship before it crashes onto Pirate Island.
101	6	"Phantoms of Never-Nether Land"	Jeff Gordon	Mark Drop	Philip Mosness	November 14, 2015	1.74	
101	6	"Magical Mayhem!"	Broni Likomanov	Mark Drop	Thomas Morgan	November 14, 2015	1.74	
Ghostly Bob and his crew steals Peg Leg Peg's spirit key after they cause some mischief. However they soon realized that they been tricked by Captain Wraith, so Captain Jake and his crew must put an end to this mischief and seals Captain Wraith once more. Guest star: Carl Reiner as Captain Treasure Tooth, Estelle Harris as Peg-Leg Peg, Bill Farmer as Ghostly Bob and Blair Underwood as Captain Wraith When Captain Hook steals Beardini's magical rings, he intends to use them to get all the sunken treasure, until Captain Hook makes a big mistake on using all 3 rings together and unleashed an underwater volcano. Captain Jake and his crew must retrieve the rings before things gets worse for Never Land. Guest star: Steve Valentine as The Remarkable Beardini
102	7	"Monkey Tiki Trouble"	Broni Likomanov	Thomas Hart	Kirk Hanson	November 21, 2015	1.68	
102	7	"Jake's Cold-Hearted Matey"	Jeff Gordon	Don Gillies	Dave Bennett and Stark Howell	November 21, 2015	1.68	
The monkey pirates have captured the Jolly Roger, and when the Monkey Captain and Captain Hook switched places thanks to the Monkey Tiki, Captain Jake and crew must put an end to this monkey business. Guest star: Chris Kattan as King Zongo ShiverJack's nephew ChillyZack tries to impress his uncle by capturing Captain Jake and his crew, but fails and ends up befriended by them. But when Jake and his crew are trapped, ChillyZack turns against his uncle due to the latter misjudging Captain Jake and his crew for evil pirates. Guest star: Mark Hamill as ShiverJack and Cameron Boyce as ChillyZack
103	8	"The Golden Dragon"	Jeff Gordon	Thomas Hart	Kirk Hanson	November 28, 2015	1.16	
103	8	"Peter Pan's 100 Treasures!"	Broni Likomanov	Brian Swenlin	Stark Howell	November 28, 2015	1.16	
Captain Jake and his mates meet Captain Chen, a legendary warrior who also reveals to be the golden dragon. So Captain Jake and his crew must get the golden dragon tooth necklace back from Captain Hook before sunset or Chen will remain a dragon forever. Guest star: John Cho as Captain Chen All the Never Land Captains are participated in Peter Pan's 100 Treasures. Guest star: Josh Duhamel as Captain Flynn, Harland Williams as Captain Frost, Teri Hatcher as Beatrice Le Beak, Jack McBrayer as Pirate Mummy and Adam Wylie as Peter Pan
104	9	"Dread the Pharoah!"	Broni Likomanov	Mark Drop	Sharon Forward, Stark Howell, and Philip Mosness	December 5, 2015	1.07	
104	9	"Sharky Unchained"	Jeff Gordon	Don Gillies	Kyle Menke	December 5, 2015	1.07	
The ex-genie Dread is freed from his bottle by the Pirate Pharaoh's mummy cat. Guest star: Chuck McCann as Dread the Evil Genie and Aasif Mandvi as Pirate Pharaoh Sharky slips away from the Jolly Roger to help Captain Jake to stop a monster shark called The Shutter.
105	10	"Captain Quixote"	Broni Likomanov	Thomas Hart	Naz Ghodrati-Azadi	March 14, 2016	1.02	
105	10	"Captain Hook's Crocodile Crew"	Jeff Gordon	Don Gillies	Dave Williams	March 14, 2016	1.02	
Captain Jake and his crew help Captain Quixote capture a squid named El Blanco while Captain Hook tries to swipe the golden shield on its tentacle. However it is soon revealed that El Blanco only wants to be chased by Captain Quixote. Guest star: Joe Nunez as Captain Quixote Captain Hook and his crew found a crocodile crown and when Captain Hook wears it, Tic Toc Croc and his friends respect him as their king. Problem is, the crocodiles only respect Hook when the crown is on his head and doesn't if it comes off so Captain Jake, Smee, Sharky, and Bones must rescue Captain Hook who's unaware of the danger he's in.
106	11	"The Creature of Doubloon Lagoon"	Broni Likomanov	Mark Drop	Sharon Forward	March 21, 2016	1.04	
106	11	"Minotaur Mix-Up!"	Jeff Gordon	Don Gillies	Dave Bennett and Kyle Menke	March 21, 2016	1.04	
When Captain Hook and his crew chase after a mysterious creature, Captain Jake and his crew goes after them. It is soon revealed that the creature is Gill, the mate of the Mighty Colossus and the treasure he has is a sword of the Mighty Colossus. After Captain Hook cheated with Monty the Minotaur, he turns into the minotaur while the latter turned into a human sailor. Captain Jake and his crew decides to help Monty win so that he can reclaim his minotaur form. Guest star: Jim Cummings as Monty the Minotaur
107	12	"Pirate Fools Day!"	Broni Likomanov	Mark Drop	Tom Morgan and Kyle Menke	March 28, 2016	1.34	
107	12	"The Forbidden City"	Jeff Gordon	Thomas Hart	Philip Mosness	March 28, 2016	1.34	
Peter Pan's shadow pranks everybody on Pirate Fools Day. However, a Shade captures Peter Pan's Shadow, so Captain Jake teamed up with Peter Pan to reclaim his shadow from the Shade. Guest star: Adam Wylie as Peter Pan and Fred Tatasciore as Shade the Shadow Pirate Captain Chen asks Captain Jake to help him find a cure for his Dragon Curse. However, their mission becomes harder when Captain Hook turns into a dragon due to ignoring the warning sign on taking treasure in the Forbidden City. After a tough battle, Chen decides to give the cure to Hook since the vial only holds enough dust for 1 cursed person. Guest star: John Cho as Captain Chen
108	13	"Attack of the Pirate Piranhas"	Jeff Gordon	Brian Swenlin	Philip Mosness	June 21, 2016	0.62	
108	13	"March of the Lava Monsters"	Broni Likomanov	Don Gillies	Tom Morgan	June 21, 2016	0.62	
When the Pirate Piranhas take residence in Never Land thanks to Captain Hook's mishap, Captain Jake and crew together with Brewster and Finn must lure the Pirate Piranhas away from Never Land and into a place where the piranhas never stop eating anything: Sunken Ship Gorge. Guest star: Ryan Kwanten as Brewster the Beast Trapper and Tyrel Jackson Williams as Finn the Mer-Boy Captain Hook found a red hot medallion in Belch Mountain, but drops it in the lava and awakes a Lava Monster called Chief Molta. But when Chief Molta summons 2 more lava monsters, Captain Jake and his crew must stop the Lava Monsters from turning Never Land into Lava Land. Guest star: Fred Tatasciore as Chief Molta and Lava Monsters
109	14	"Beardini's Apprentice"	Broni Likomanov	Mark Drop	Kyle Menke	July 11, 2016	0.65	
109	14	"Mummy First Mate"	Jeff Gordon	Mark Drop	Sharon Forward and Stark Howell	July 11, 2016	0.65	
Cubby has difficulty learning to use a magic wand during a lesson with the Remarkable Beardini. Guest star: Steve Valentine as The Remarkable Beardini The Pirate Pharaoh commands the Pirate Mummy to be his First Mate on a hunt for the Magical Elixir. Guest star: Aasif Mandvi as Pirate Pharaoh, Jack McBrayer as Pirate Mummy
110	15	"The Legion of Pirate Villains"	Jeff Gordon and Broni Likomanov	Mark Seidenberg	Dave Bennett, Kirk Hanson, Joseph Scott and Dave Williams	October 1, 2016	1.04	
The Grim Buccaneer forms a group of pirate villains; Captain Jake and his crew set out to stop the new threat. Guest star: Christian Slater as Grim Buccaneer, Malcolm McDowell as Lord Fathom, Jim Rash as Sinker, Tony Hale as Doctor Undergear, Mark Hamill as ShiverJack, and Héctor Elizondo as Captain Colossus
111	16	"Crabageddon!"	Broni Likomanov	Story by : Mark Drop; Written by : Mark Drop and Brian Swenlin	Joseph Scott	October 8, 2016	0.80	
111	16	"Night of the Stonewolf"	Jeff Gordon	Thomas Hart	Dave Williams	October 8, 2016	0.80	
Captain Jake, King Crab, and Crab Louie team up to oust Doctor Undergear for taking over Crab Island. Guest star: Bobby Moynihan as King Crab, Rob De Luca as one of the crabs, Jonathan Morgan Heit as Crab Louie Hook tricks Captain Jake and his crew into finding the legendary Stonewolf Treasure.
112	17	"Tales of Captain Buzzard"	Broni Likomanov and Jeff Gordon	Don Gillies	Dave Bennett and Kirk Hanson	October 15, 2016	0.72	
Grandpa Bones tells a story in which Captain Jake and his crew portray the swashbuckling heroes called The Three Buccaneers while trapped in a cave with a fire breathing dragon. Guest star: Rob Paulsen as Captain Buzzard Bones, Steve Valentine as Beardini the Pirate Magician, Rhys Darby, as Percy the Penguin, Leigh-Allyn Baker as Queen Coralie
113	18	"Tiger Sharky Strikes Again!"	Jeff Gordon	Don Gillies	Philip Mosness	October 22, 2016	0.87	
113	18	"Captain Jake's Pirate Power Crew!"	Broni Likomanov	Thomas Hart	Tom Morgan and Philip Mosness	October 22, 2016	0.87	
Chaos Khan invades Never Land so Tiger Sharky inducts Captain Jake into the Dark-Shark Clan to defend the legendary sword of chaos. Guest star: Kevin Michael Richardson as Chaos Khan Peter Pan gifts Captain Jake and his crew with a set of Pirate Power Bandanas. Guest star: Chris Kattan as King Zongo
114	19	"Captain Hook's Last Stand!"	Jeff Gordon and Broni Likomanov	Mark Seidenberg and Brian Swenlin	Dave Bennett, Kirk Hanson, Tom Morgan, Philip Mosness, and Dave Williams	November 6, 2016	0.95	
When Captain Hook turns Peter Pan to stone, Captain Jake and his crew get help from Wendy, John, and Michael to find the magic items needed to rescue their petrified friend. Guest stars: Adam Wylie as Peter Pan, Mae Whitman as Tinker Bell, Maia Mitchell as Wendy Darling, Harry Erasmus as John Darling, and Colby Mulgrew as Michael Darling Note 1: Harry Erasmus replaces Elliot Reeve as the voice of John Darling.

== Shorts ==
=== Playing with Skully (2012) ===
This miniseries is a collection of shorts that center around the parrot character, Skully.

1. Ship Ahoy! - 19 September 2012
2. Coconuts on Pirate Island - 19 September 2012
3. North Bound - 19 September 2012
4. Pirate Puzzle - 19 September 2012
5. Sailing the Never Sea - 19 September 2012
6. Diving in the Coral Reef - 19 September 2012
7. Where's Sandy - 22 September 2012
8. Pulley Hook - 23 September 2012

=== Jake's Never Land Pirate School (2012) ===
This miniseries is a collection of shorts that center around Jake and his crew teaching the viewers valuable pirate skills.

1. Flying - November 26, 2012
2. Tic Toc Croc!
3. B-B-Big Bugs!
4. Go, Bucky!
5. Saving Captain Hook
6. Mama Hook Knows Best!
7. Dancing with Pirates
8. I've Got my Sword
9. Hop-Hop-Hop!
10. Look Out!

=== Jake's Buccaneer Blast ===
A miniseries based on these Jake and the Never Land Pirates Lego Duplo toys sometimes airs on Disney Junior to fill up space. Lego also hosts all these full videos for free viewing on YouTube.

1. The Golden Pirate Pyramid - 12 November 2014
2. The Treasure of Belch Mountain - 12 November 2014
3. Stormy Seas - 27 January 2015
4. The Big Golden Tiki Treasure! - 28 January 2015
5. Hideout Hijinks! - 27 February 2015
6. Pirates on Ice - 27 February 2015
7. The Never Land Jungle Speedway - 14 April 2015
8. The Never Land Pirate Pieces of Eight! - 28 April 2015

=== DJ Melodies (2015) ===
1. Do It
2. Together
