= Maryellen MacDonald =

Maryellen MacDonald is Donald P. Hayes Professor of Psychology at the University of Wisconsin–Madison. She specializes in psycholinguistics, focusing specifically on the relationship between language comprehension and production and the role of working memory. MacDonald received a Ph.D. from the University of California, Los Angeles in 1986. She is a fellow of the Cognitive Science Society. She is married to fellow psychologist Mark Seidenberg and has two children.
