= Jake and the Never Land Pirates =

American animated television series

- Also known as: Captain Jake and the Never Land Pirates (season 4)
- Genre: Adventure; Fantasy; Musical
- Developed by: Bobs Gannaway
- Directed by: Howy Parkins (seasons 1–3); Jeff Gordon (season 4); Broni Likomanov (season 4)
- Voices of: Colin Ford; Cameron Boyce; Sean Ryan Fox; Riley Thomas Stewart; Gabe Eggerling; Madison Pettis; Megan Richie; Jonathan Morgan Heit; Jadon Sand; David Arquette; Corey Burton; Jeff Bennett; Loren Hoskins
- Composers: Loren Hoskins; Kevin Hendrickson; Keith Horn
- Country of origin: United States
- Original language: English
- No. of seasons: 4
- No. of episodes: 114 (215 segments) (list of episodes)

Production
- Executive producer: Rob LaDuca
- Producers: Mark Seidenberg; Bradley Bowlen
- Editor: Reid Kramer
- Running time: 24 minutes
- Production company: Disney Television Animation (Note: Animation for the series is outsourced to Mercury Filmworks for the first three seasons, and Bardel Entertainment and Toon City for the final season.)

Original release
- Network: Disney Junior; Disney Channel
- Release: February 14, 2011 – November 6, 2016

Jake and the Never Land Pirates (titled Captain Jake and the Never Land Pirates for the fourth season) is an American animated children's television series for Disney Junior. A spin-off of the Peter Pan franchise, which was itself based on the 1904 play and 1911 book by J. M. Barrie, it was the first Disney Junior original show following the switch from its former moniker Playhouse Disney. It stars Gabe Eggerling, Megan Richie, Jadon Sand, David Arquette, Corey Burton, Jeff Bennett and Loren Hoskins, with Colin Ford, Cameron Boyce, Sean Ryan Fox, Riley Thomas Stewart, Madison Pettis and Jonathan Morgan Heit previously voicing Eggerling, Richie, and Sand's parts. The series was developed by Disney veteran Bobs Gannaway, whose works include Mickey Mouse Clubhouse and Secret of the Wings.

The series focuses on Jake, Izzy, Cubby, and their parrot Skully, a band of young pirates who spend their days competing for treasure against Captain Hook and his pirate crew, consisting of Mr. Smee, Sharky and Bones. They are often accompanied by several characters, including their living pirate ship, Bucky, and their mermaid friend, Marina.

The series' fourth and final season, under the name Captain Jake and the Never Land Pirates, premiered on October 17, 2015. The show ran until November 6, 2016, with reruns continuing through December 1, 2017.

== Premise ==
The show takes place in Neverland and focuses on three pirate kids Jake, Izzy, and Cubby. Each episode consists of two eleven-minute segments in which Jake his crew and the audience have adventures around Never Land and outsmart Captain Hook and his crew. Every episode begins with a prologue of Jake asking the viewer to say "Yo-ho-ho!" with him and his crew. In each segment, they earn gold doubloons each time they solve a problem together, and at the end they count them and put them in their "Team Treasure Chest".

The first season of the series followed more "playful" conflicts, such as Jake and the crew reclaiming their basketball or skateboard from Captain Hook. The second season had less interactive moments and a larger scale of adventure, with plots such as the characters finding a lost city of gold and an ancient pirate pyramid. The third season has an updated theme song and more action. The fourth and final season has one fourth-wall break at the end of each episode.

Almost every episode contains two eleven-minute animated segments, followed by a live-action song by the Never Land Pirate Band. The singing characters Sharky and Bones appear in both animated and live-action forms, being part of Hook's crew.

== Episodes ==
Season	Segments	Episodes	Originally released	
Season	Segments	Episodes	First released	Last released
1	49	25	February 14, 2011	February 13, 2012
2	68	36	February 24, 2012	December 6, 2013
3	63	34	January 3, 2014	September 11, 2015
4	35	19	October 16, 2015	November 6, 2016

== Characters ==
Bucky's Jolly Roger

=== Main ===
- Jake (voiced by Colin Ford from season 1-early season 2, Cameron Boyce from late season 2-early season 3, Sean Ryan Fox from "Smee–erella"-"The Great Never Sea Conquest", Riley Thomas Stewart from late season 3-early season 4 and Gabe Eggerling in late season 4) is the protagonist and leader of the Never Land Pirates, and Captain Hook's main pirate rival. He is shown using a telescope and steering the ship in the opening. He used the wooden Forever Sword, which was cut from the Forever Tree and given to him by Peter Pan. He also briefly used the transformable Mega-Mecha Sword and the golden Destiny Sword. As a captain, he uses the metal Mighty Captain's Sword, which can cut through metal padlocks, heat up to cut through ice bars, shoot heat beams, and deflect cold or energy blasts. Both cutlasses have a crossguard on the hilt but the Mighty Captain's Sword has a larger pommel and no knuckle-bow on the side. He also acquires an invisibility ring and has used Izzy's pixie dust to fly.
- Izzy (voiced by Madison Pettis from season 1–early season 3 and Megan Richie from late season 3-season 4) acts as Jake's second-in-command. She has a small sack of pixie dust given to her by Tinker Bell and her friends, which the team uses only in emergencies. She is smart, brave and sweet, she has pirate and mermaid friends. Her catchphrase is "Yay, hey, no way!"
- Cubby (voiced by Jonathan Morgan Heit from season 1–early season 3 and Jadon Sand from late season 3-season 4) is the youngest of the group and Jake's best friend, who is timid and lacks confidence. He has the map of Never Land and is shown manning the crow's nest in the opening. He is not a member of the Lost Boys, despite physically resembling the Cubby of the group. His catchphrase is "Aww, coconuts!"
- Skully (speaking voice by David Arquette and singing voice by Loren Hoskins) is a green anthropomorphic parrot who acts like a guardian to the team and keeps a lookout for Captain Hook and Mr. Smee. His catchphrase is "Crackers!"
- Bucky is Jake, Izzy, Cubby, and Skully's pirate ship. It is shown to have some life, as it can listen to their orders. It can move parts of itself, including stairs, a slide, a bell, and its sails and steering mechanisms, and fly.
- Captain Hook (voiced by Corey Burton) is Never Land's resident pirate captain and Peter Pan's nemesis. He is the commander of the galleon "The Jolly Roger". He is legendary for his cruelty to his enemies and his own men and struggles to maintain a permanent crew, as he currently has only three crew members and the rest of his crew is never seen. He also likes to keep a collection of different things, such as seashells. His greatest fear is encountering Tick Tock, the crocodile that ate his hand after Peter Pan sliced it off in a sword fight.
- Mr. Smee (voiced by Jeff Bennett) is Captain Hook's first mate. He is also an expert on Never Land's legends and the wisest of Captain Hook's pirates, but no one ever seems to listen to his suggestions.
- Sharky (voiced by Loren Hoskins) and Bones (voiced by Jeff Bennett; and singing voices provided by Kevin Hendrickson) are members of Captain Hook's pirate crew. They usually spend time performing musical numbers and act as troubadours. Live-action versions appear at the end of the show to perform an original song.
- The Jolly Roger is Captain Hook and his crew's ship. It is bigger than Bucky, but unlike it is not animate.

=== Recurring ===
- Marina (voiced by Ariel Winter) is a young mermaid who lives with her people in the ocean surrounding Never Land. Unlike some of the mermaids, who tend to be selfish, vain, and cruel, Marina is gentle and kind to the crew and is close friends with Izzy, often showing them the secrets of the Never Sea she has discovered. She also has a little sister named Stormy and has a crush on Jake.
- Tick-Tock (vocal effects by Dee Bradley Baker) is the crocodile that ate Captain Hook's left hand after Peter Pan cut it off in a sword fight and has followed the Jolly Roger ever since. He also ate an alarm clock, whose sound alerts Captain Hook to his presence.
- Never Bird (vocal effects by Russi Taylor) is a former sidekick of Captain Hook, who betrays him and joins Jake and his crew.
- Sandy (voiced by Loren Hoskins) is Marina's singing pet starfish, who has the ability to heal through a special song.
- The Pirate Princess (speaking voice by Tori Spelling and singing voice by Laura Dickinson) is a pirate who was cursed and shipwrecked in a hidden grotto, but is later rescued by Jake and his crew.
- Winger (voiced by Lisa Loeb) is Skully's close friend, who is revealed to be the princess of the Sky Bird Kingdom.
- The Wise Old Parrot (voiced by Adam West) is an aged scarlet macaw and the ruler of the Sky Bird Kingdom.
- The Monkey (voiced by Dee Bradley Baker) is a mischievous primate who steals Jake's bongos, but later returns them and befriends Jake and his crew.
- Mama Hook (voiced by Sharon Osbourne) is Captain Hook's mother.
- Red Jessica (voiced by Jane Kaczmarek) is a pirate whom Captain Hook falls in love with.
- Captain Flynn (voiced by Josh Duhamel) is a pirate who was stranded in the Never Land desert with his ship, the "Barracuda", but is rescued by Jake and his crew.
- Peter Pan (voiced by Adam Wylie) is Captain Hook's nemesis and the leader of Never Land and the Lost Boys. He is mentioned throughout the series, but physically appears in the special episodes "Peter Pan Returns", "Jake Saves Bucky", "Never Land Rescue", and "Battle for the Book".
- Stormy (voiced by Allisyn Ashley Arm) is Marina's lazy, yet well-meaning younger sister.
- The Sea Witch (voiced by Carol Kane) is an evil witch who seeks to turn the Pirate Princess into gold, but later turns good after Izzy stops her.
- The Gorilla (voiced by Dee Bradley Baker) is a gorilla who likes bananas and being tickled behind the ear.
- The Tiki Trees (voiced by Corey Burton and Loren Hoskins) are a live forest who are friendly to Jake and his crew. They originally wouldn’t let Captain Hook into their forest, but now they don’t mind.
- Misty (speaking voice by Tiffani Thiessen and singing voice by Laura Dickinson) is a good witch who tends to be the Pirate Princess' neighbor.
- Pip (voiced by Jerry O'Connell) is a pirate genie who once resided in a ship-in-the-bottle.
- Percy (voiced by Rhys Darby) is an anthropomorphic penguin who Jake and his crew help to get his group to their colony.
- Beatrice Le Beak (voiced by Teri Hatcher) is a sneaky pirate who steals from Captain Hook.
- Queen Coralie (voiced by Leigh-Allyn Baker) is the mermaid queen of the city of Neptune. She rules her kingdom with a gentle hand. She is usually egocentric and snobbish, but she is also kind, affectionate and warm. She loves her kingdom and all the creatures of the sea, but she doesn't like Captain Hook's misdeeds.
- Pirate Mummy (voiced by Jack McBrayer) is a thousand-year-old pirate mummy who inhabits the Pirate Mummy's Tomb in the Never Land Desert.
- Ghostly Bob (voiced by Bill Farmer) is the leader of a mischievous band of pirate ghosts who were sealed away in the wooden crate and cast into the bottom of the Never Sea.
- Wendy Darling (voiced by Maia Mitchell) is the eldest of the Darling siblings and one of Peter Pan and Tinker Bell's oldest and dearest friends. She likes to play with fairies, mermaids and even Indians, and what she wants most is to become a fairy and mermaid to play.
- John Darling (voiced by Elliot Reeve) is the middle of the Darling siblings.
- Michael Darling (voiced by Colby Mulgrew) is the brother of Wendy and John Darling.
- Peg-Leg Peg (voiced by Estelle Harris) is a pirate ghost and Captain Treasure Tooth's love interest.
- Dread (voiced by David Tennant) is an evil genie who steals other genies' magic for himself.
- Lord Fathom (voiced by Malcolm McDowell) is an evil Merwizard who plots to take over the Never Sea.
- Beardini (voiced by Steve Valentine) is a pirate magician who lives on Never Land.
- ShiverJack (voiced by Mark Hamill) is a sorcerer with ice powers.
- Doctor Undergear (voiced by Tony Hale) is a mad inventor.
- The Grim Buccaneer (voiced by Christian Slater) is a shadowy pirate.
- Captain Wraith (voiced by Blair Underwood) is a pirate ghost who resides on Ghost Island. He seeks to take over the Never World by using his enchanted treasure to transform pirates who travel to Ghost Island in search of treasure into his ghostly crew.
- King Zongo (voiced by Chris Kattan) is the ruler of the pirate monkeys of Never Land.
- Captain Colossus (voiced by Héctor Elizondo) is a pirate and former captain of the battleship the Mighty Colossus.

== Music ==
The show's musical elements are handled by Loren Hoskins and Kevin Hendrickson, who were emailed by the show's creator Bobs Gannaway, asking if they would be interested in creating songs for the show. According to Hoskins, Gannaway "just wanted good music to listen to while he was writing the pilot". Gannaway searched "pirate music for kids" online and found his way to Captain Bogg and Salty, listening to their songs while working on the script. He introduced the band to Jay Stutler, vice president of music at Disney Television Animation. "We're in charge of creating every note of music for the show. We create the underscore. We sit in the studio and record the background music that comes in and out." The music for the show has been praised for being enjoyable for both the children, and the adult caretakers. Three soundtracks have been released featuring songs from the show.

== Broadcast ==
The series aired worldwide on Disney Junior. It premiered on May 6, 2011, in Canada, on May 7, 2011, in the United Kingdom and Ireland, on May 29, 2011, in Australia and New Zealand, on June 1, 2011, in South Africa, on July 4, 2011, in India, on July 11, 2011, in Southeast Asia, and on April 29, 2013, in Zimbabwe, with TVNZ in New Zealand and 7flix in Australia. It was also broadcast in Belgium on Club RTL, in France on M6 and TF1 as part of the TFOU block, and in Greece on ERT1 (Season 1 only).

== Home media ==
Collection	Included episodes	Release date
Yo Ho, Mateys Away!	"Hats Off to Hook/Escape from Belch Mountain", "Hide the Hideout!/The Old Shell Game", "Izzy's Pirate Puzzle/The Never Land Games", "Off the Hook!/Never Say Never!", "Cubby's Sunken Treasure/Cubby's Goldfish", "Happy Hook Day!/No Returns!", "The Sky's The Limit!/Bucky Makes a Splash"	September 27, 2011
Peter Pan Returns	"Peter Pan Returns" Full Length Adventure, "The Elephant Surprise!/Jake's Jungle Groove", "The Pirate Pup!/Pirate Rock!", "The Sword and the Stone/Jake's Home Run", "The Pirate Princess/The Rainbow Wand", "Mama Hook Knows Best!/Pixie Dust Away"	April 3, 2012
Jake Saves Bucky	"Jake Saves Bucky" Full Length Adventure, "Peter's Musical Pipes/The Never Night Star", "Captain Hook's Hooks/Mr. Smee's Pet", "Race-Around Rock!/Captain Hook is Missing!", "Captain Hook's Lagoon/Undersea Bucky!"	October 16, 2012
Never Land Rescue	"Never Land Rescue" Full Length Adventure, "It's a Pirate Picnic / The Key to Skull Rock ", "The Golden Twilight Treasure / Rock the Croc!", "Jake and Sneaky Le Beak / Cubby the Brave", "Jake's Special Delivery / Seahorse Saddle-Up!"	November 19, 2013
Battle for the Book	"Battle for the Book" Full Length Adventure, "Treasure of the Pirate Mummy's Tomb / Mystery of the Missing Treasure!", "Pirate Genie Tales" Full Length Adventure, "Captain Gizmo / Jake's Pirate Swap Meet", "Sleeping Mermaid / Jake's Mega-Mecha Sword"	January 6, 2015
The Great Never Sea Conquest	"The Great Never Sea Conquest" Full Length Adventure, "Into the Heart of Coldness/The Remarkable Beardini!", "Escape from Ghost Island/ The Island of Doctor Undergear", "Rise of the Pirate Pharaoh/ The Golden Hook", "The Mystery of the Mighty Colossus/The Doubloon Monsoon", "Shark Attack!/Captain Hook's Colossal Collision"	January 12, 2016

== Reception ==
=== Critical ===
The series received mixed reviews. A review in Variety called it "part video game, part interactive cartoon, part advertisement for 'Peter Pan' merchandise". The Los Angeles Times gave a mixed review of the show's portrayal of Captain Hook compared to the classic Peter Pan, stating that the character "has been laundered — reasonably enough, yet sadly as well — into a shell of his former self, too silly to be frightening, not even a decent bully, just a kind of (much) older boy who wants to steal your toys." Common Sense Media rated it "on" for ages 3 and older, praising the educational content, role models, and especially the messages of the show, and expressing only mild concern about the moderate violence. As the flagship of the newly launched Disney Junior channel, the series was rated the most-watched program among boys ages 2–5 during its first few weeks on the air, with 2.9 million viewers, including 1.1 million ages 2–5, and over 600,000 women ages 18–49 (presumed to be mothers and other caregivers). On July 27, the series was awarded #2 of the Best TV Shows 2011 list.

The character Jake received positive reviews. The character has been thought of as a "classic Disney character", lovable and entertaining addition. He has quickly become an icon at Disney's Hollywood Studios from the popular Disney Junior Live as well as being added on the park's entrance drawings. The atmosphere character can be seen at the Hollywood And Vine character breakfast and the Animation courtyard, while at Disney California Adventure, Jake can be found on Hollywood Boulevard in Hollywood Land.

=== Awards and nominations ===
Award	Category	Nominee	Result
Disney Sanya Awards	Best Episode [Pirate-Sitting Pirates]		Won
Young Artist Award	Best Performance in a Voice-Over Role – Young Actor	Colin Ford	Won
Daytime Emmy Award	Outstanding Casting for an Animated Series or Special	Brian Mathias and Aaron Drown	Nominated
Daytime Emmy Award	Outstanding Pre-School Children's Animated Program	Rob LaDuca, Bradley Bowlen and Mark Seidenberg	Nominated
Daytime Emmy Award	Outstanding Casting for an Animated Series or Special	Abbie D'Andrea and Brian Mathias	Nominated
Daytime Emmy Award	Outstanding Individual in Animation	Jairo Lizarazu – background layout designer	Won

== Merchandise ==
Upon the initial release of the series onwards, there has been a high demand for toys, games, and other merchandise from the show. At the American International Toy Fair in New York City, Disney announced a line of toys to be released in the summer of 2012.

=== Video games ===
On May 24, 2012, the Jake's Never Land Pirate School app was released on Apple and Android devices, as well as a storyline-based MobiGo cartridge video game by VTech.

A variety of other video games are based on the series including:

1. Big Air Adventure a 5-series crossover of title characters from Doc McStuffins, Henry Hugglemonster, Miles from Tomorrowland, and Sofia the First
2. Bucky's Never Sea Hunt
3. Cave of Mystery
4. Go Bananas
5. Golden Pirate Pumpkin Patch
6. Hook Yer Pirate Name
7. Hook's Merry Winter Treasure Hunt
8. Izzy's Flying Adventure
9. Jake and the Never Land Pirates Sand Pirates
10. Never Land Games
11. Shadow Shenanigans
12. Sharky and Bones Pirate Rock
13. Super Pirate Powers
14. The Great Pirate Pyramid
15. Rainbow Wand Color Quest
16. Jake's Story Quest

== Spin-offs ==
A spin-off series of shorts of the show centering on Skully, titled Playing With Skully, aired on September 19, 2012. Another short series entitled Jake's Never Land Pirate School premiered on November 26, 2012. The third spin-off, Mama Hook Knows Best! premiered on September 29, 2013, starring Sharon Osbourne as Mama Hook, but instead of a series, it was a book. The fourth spin-off entitled, Jake's Buccaneer Blast premiered on October 26, 2014, as the first Lego Duplo adventure.

== See also ==
- Never Land Pirate Band
- Tree Fu Tom

== Notes ==
Preceded by N/A	Disney Junior Shows; 2011	Succeeded by Babar and the Adventures of Badou
