= Jonathan Morgan Heit =

American actor (born 2000)

- Other name: Jonathan Heit
- Occupations: Actor; gallerist
- Years active: 2006–2016

Jonathan Morgan Heit (born July 16, 2000) is an American gallerist and former child actor.

== Life and career ==
He is known for his role in the Adam Sandler film, Bedtime Stories, where he played Patrick. He also directed and wrote a short film entitled It Happens, about a man who has a terrible day.

Heit is the son of Melissa Segal and Jay Heit. His professional acting debut was in 2006, when he appeared in the television series Close to Home and General Hospital. In 2007, he appeared in two more television shows, ER and the talk show The Showbiz Show with David Spade. He also did voice over for Holly and Hal Moose: Our Uplifting Christmas Adventure and Santa Buddies. Recently, Heit has appeared in Valentine's Day and Date Night. He also had a leading role in the TV series, Granite Flats. Heit was the voice of Cubby in the Disney Junior series Jake and the Never Land Pirates during the first three seasons before he was replaced by Jadon Sand. He retired from acting in 2016 and now works as a gallerist and runs an online art gallery called Heit Gallery.

== Filmography ==
Year	Film	Role	Notes
2006	Close to Home	Frankie Waters	TV series; Episode: "Community"
2006	General Hospital	Little Boy	TV soap opera; Episode #1.11201; Uncredited
2007	ER	Jessie	TV series; Episode "Dying Is Easy..."
2007	The Showbiz Show with David Spade	Boy	TV talk show, American Idol Camp Skit
2008	Bedtime Stories	Patrick	Film debut
2008	Holly and Hal Moose: Christmas Adventure	Weston the Elf (voice)	TV movie
2009	Monk	Billy Cooper	TV series; Episode: "Mr. Monk's Favorite Show"
2009	Santa Buddies: The Legend of Santa Paws	Mud Bud	Singing voice; Uncredited
2009	How I Met Your Mother	Boy #1	TV series; Episode: "Slapsgiving 2: Revenge of the Slap"
2010	Valentine's Day	Franklin	
2010	Date Night	Oliver Foster	
2010	The Search for Santa Paws	Jimmy	
2011	Rules of Engagement	Leland	TV series; Episode: "Uh-Oh It's Magic"
2011	Starsucker	Gabriel	Short film
2011	Wish Wizard	Larry the Leprechaun	Short film
2011–16	Jake and the Never Land Pirates	Cubby, Crab Louie (voice)	Main role (Season 1-early Season 3); Guest role (Season 4)
2011–16	Family Guy	Grandchild #2, Great Grandchild, Kid #1 Boy, Billy, Little Boy, Amusement Park Ride Operator (voice)	15 episodes
2013	Escape from Planet Earth	Kip Supernova (voice)	
2013	Super Buddies	Pete	Direct-to-DVD film; Supporting character
2013	Tarzan	4-year-old Tarzan	feature film
2013–15	Granite Flats	Arthur Milligan	Main role
