= Mark Seidenberg =

Mark S. Seidenberg is a professor emeritus of Psychology at the University of Wisconsin–Madison. Previously he was Vilas Research Professor and Donald O. Hebb Professor of Psychology there and a Senior Scientist at Haskins Laboratories. He is a specialist in psycholinguistics, focusing on the cognitive and neurological bases of language and reading. Seidenberg received his Ph.D. from Columbia University under the mentorship of Thomas Bever and completed a postdoctoral fellowship at the Center for the Study of Reading at the University of Illinois. He has held academic positions at McGill University, the University of Southern California, and after 2001 at the University of Wisconsin. Seidenberg has published over a hundred scientific articles and is the author of Language at the Speed of Sight (2017). Seidenberg is married to fellow psychologist Maryellen MacDonald and has two children.
