= Howy Parkins =

American animator and director

- Education: Sheridan College Trafalgar Road Campus
- Occupations: Film director; animation director; layout artist
- Years active: 1996–present
- Employer: Walt Disney Animation Studios
- Awards: Annie Awards for Best Directing in an Animated Television Production (2008) The Emperor's New School; Annie Awards for Best General Audience Animated Television Production for Preschool Children (2013) Jake and the Never Land Pirates

Howy Parkins is an American animator and director. He is known for directing the animated television series The Lion Guard, Jake and the Never Land Pirates, and Lloyd in Space.

== Career ==
Parkins started his career as a layout artist in some of his works, including The Care Bears Movie, Punky Brewster, and Star Wars: Ewoks.

In 1996, Parkins directed the television series Hey Arnold! for Nickelodeon Animation Studio. In 2006, he worked as a director for Disney's The Emperor's New School and Mickey Mouse Clubhouse.

== Filmography ==
- Rocko's Modern Life (animation director)
- Hey Arnold!
- Recess
- Rugrats
- Lloyd in Space
- Dave the Barbarian
- The Emperor's New School
- Jake and the Never Land Pirates
- The Lion Guard (co-executive producer, supervising director, voice of Mbeya)
- Hailey's On It! (co-executive producer)
