= Captain Bogg and Salty =

American rock band

- Origin: Portland, Oregon, United States
- Genres: Rock; Pirate-themed music Sea shanties Children's music
- Years active: 1999–2011
- Label: Scabbydisc
- Members: Lucas Haley; Kevin Hendrickson; Loren Hoskins; Paul Iannotti; Andy Lindberg; Dave Owen

Captain Bogg and Salty was a pirate-themed rock band from Portland, Oregon, and a representative member of the subgenre of pirate rock. The band was well known for their live shows, performed in full pirate regalia. The band members each portrayed crew members of the pirate ship Pollywogg, ranging from the ship's captain, Angus Bogg, to the lowly deck-hand Salty.

The band enjoyed success in the Pacific Northwest as both children's entertainers, and as a band enjoyed by adults—having performed numerous sold-out appearances in both children's venues (such as libraries) and adult venues (such as nightclubs). They performed the same material in both types of venue; they have been quite adept at crossing the generation gap.

== History ==
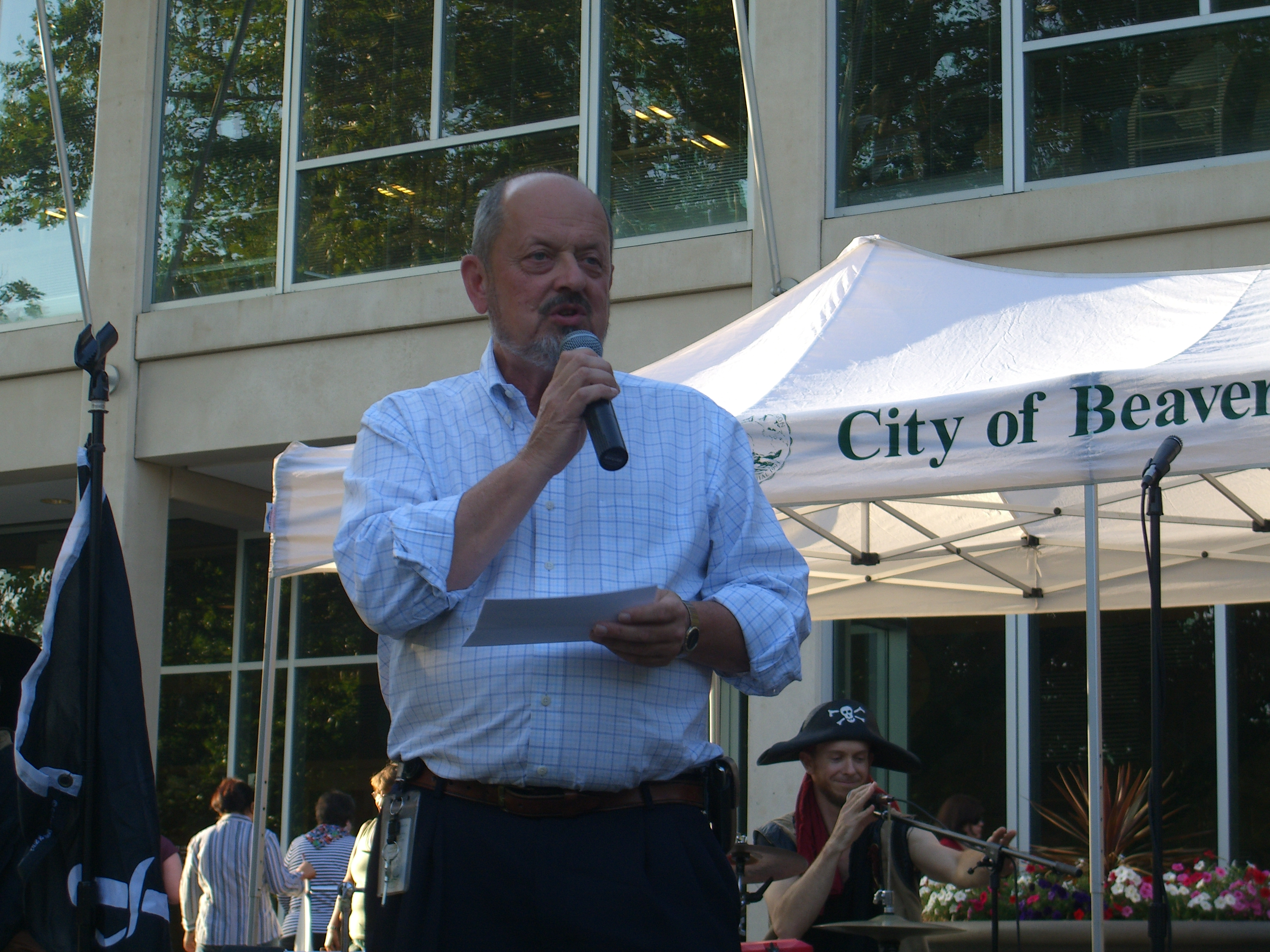
Dave Owen of Captain Bogg and Salty behind Beaverton, Oregon mayor Dennis Doyle

The band was formed in 1999 by Kevin Hendrickson, a musician involved with several other pirate-themed bands, most notably Pirate Jenny, and Loren Hoskins, a voice actor and comedian from the Portland area. The duo produced the band's first album, Bedtime Stories for Pirates as a concept album. The album was well-received, and is found in many pirate-themed attractions, including the Treasure Island Hotel and Casino. As demand grew, four additional musicians joined the band, including fellow Pirate Jenny alumnus Paul Iannotti, and local stage actor Andy Lindberg, who as a teenager garnered some measure of infamy for his portrayal of "Lardass" Hogan in the 1986 Rob Reiner film Stand By Me. The band released three additional albums: Pegleg Tango (2005), Prelude to Mutiny (2006), and Emphatical Piratical (2009). Pegleg Tango was enthusiastically reviewed by Entertainment Weekly magazine.

The band also played several shows in the New York City area in October 2006, culminating in an appearance opening for Harvey Danger at the famed Maxwell's nightclub in Hoboken, New Jersey. In September 2007, Lindberg went on hiatus to pursue an acting career in New York City, according to the band's website.

Hendrickson and Hoskins also wrote and performed the music for the Disney Junior animated television series Jake and the Never Land Pirates.

== Band members ==
The band had the following members. In addition to instruments played, the characters aboard the Pollywogg are listed.

- Loren Hoskins (Vocals, Percussion) — Portrays the characters of Captain Bogg, Salty, Charlie Scuppers (the navigator), Mr. Gilly (the bosun)
- Kevin Hendrickson (Guitar, Accordion, Banjo, Vocals) — Portrays First Mate McGraw, Chucklehead Pete (cabin boy)
- Paul Iannotti (Piano, Vocals) — Portrays Sunny Jim, the sea-cook.
- Lucas Haley (Bass, Vocals) — Portrays Mr. Filibuster, a crewman who formerly sailed with the Royal Navy.
- Dave Owen (Drums, Vocals) — Portrays Ramshackle, the ship's carpenter.

Band members on hiatus:

- Andy Lindberg (Guitar, Vocals) — Portrays Buckle, the gunner aboard the Pollywog.
- Botielus (Accordion, Vocals) — Portrays Squeezy, the lime squeezer aboard the Pollywog.

== Discography ==
The band released four albums, self-published under the "Scabbydisc" label.

=== Bedtime Stories For Pirates (1999) ===
1. Recruitin' the Crew (Loren Hoskins, Kevin Hendrickson)
2. I'm a Singin' Pirate (Hoskins, Hendrickson)
3. Deedle Dee Toe (Hoskins, Hendrickson)
4. Cat O Nine Tales (Hoskins, Hendrickson)
5. Scurvy (Hoskins, Hendrickson)
6. Weather Eye (Hoskins, Hendrickson)
7. Billy Bones (Hoskins, Hendrickson)
8. Manatee (Andy Lindberg)
9. The Pollywogg (Hoskins, Hendrickson; music traditional)

=== Pegleg Tango (2005) ===
1. Age of Buccaneers (spoken)
2. Weigh Anchor
3. I'm a Pirate
4. Pieces of 8ight
5. Happy Birthday Chucklehead (spoken)
6. Pirate Party
7. Scallywagg (Lindberg)
8. Nellie the Elephant (Ralph Butler, Peter Hart)
9. Sea Monster (Paul Ianotti)
10. What it's Really Like on a Ship
11. The Tortuga Caper (spoken)
12. Pegleg Tango
13. Sea Kings
14. Pull Away Home

The track Pegleg Tango is credited to a fictitious dance instructor named "HiJack Katanga", though actually performed by Hoskins.

=== Prelude to Mutiny (2006) ===
1. Drunken Sailor (traditional)
2. Bosun Whistle
3. Mutiny of the Hispaniola
4. Days and Days (Hendrickson)
5. Loneliest Sailor (Iannotti)
6. Part of Your World (Howard Ashman, Alan Menken)
7. Doldrums (Lindberg)
8. Wind
9. Dead Men Tell No Tales
10. Hoist the Grog

=== Emphatical Piratical (2009) ===
1. Emphatical Piratical (music by Jacques Offenbach, lyrics and arrangement by Hoskins, Hendrickson)
2. Don't Drink Sea Water (Hoskins, Hendrickson)
3. Port Side (Hoskins, Hendrickson)
4. Treading the Seas for Pirate Gold (Hendrickson)
5. Bunnyjacks (Hoskins, Hendrickson)
6. Frogg Island (Hoskins, Lucas Haley)
7. Purple Tiki (Hoskins, Hendrickson, Dave Owen)
8. The Plank Walker
9. Sea Monster II (Iannotti)
10. Never Smile at a Crocodile (Sammy Fain, Sammy Cahn)
11. Waltz of the Waves (Lindberg)
12. Who's at Captain's Table? (Hoskins, Hendrickson)
