= Hebrews to Negroes: Wake Up Black America =

2018 antisemitic film

- Directed by: Ronald Dalton Jr.
- Written by: Ronald Dalton Jr.
- Produced by: Ronald Dalton Jr.
- Edited by: Carl Jackson
- Distributed by: Amazon Prime Video
- Release date: December 20, 2018
- Running time: 208 minutes
- Country: United States
- Language: English
- Budget: $8,000

Hebrews to Negroes: Wake Up Black America is a 2018 film directed, written, and produced by Ronald Dalton Jr. The film espouses antisemitic messaging and spreads misinformation. It contains antisemitic tropes, Holocaust denial, and claims of an international Jewish conspiracy.

The film is based upon a book of the same name, also written by Dalton, that promotes Black Hebrew Israelite beliefs. It existed in relative obscurity from the time of its release until October 2022. That month, NBA superstar Kyrie Irving posted a link to it on his Twitter account.

In November 2026, the South African Film and Publication Board said that the movie "incites hatred and spreads dangerous misinformation" and refused to classify the film, meaning that it is "prohibited from creation, possession and distribution is South Africa".

== Background ==
The film was homemade by amateur filmmaker Ronald Dalton Jr. on a reported budget of $8,000.

Dalton claimed to have received "divine revelations" beginning around 2010.

== Synopsis ==
The film promotes Black Hebrew Israelite beliefs that some people of color, including Black Americans, "are the true descendants of the biblical Israelites." One of the ideas shared in the film is that the Jews of today are not actual Jews and they culturally appropriated the religious heritage of Black people and then covered it up. This claim has been debunked.

The film is filled with antisemitism, including claims of an international Jewish conspiracy that aims to oppress and defraud Black people. The film includes many antisemitic tropes, including claims of Jewish power and greed, claims that Jews control the media and claims of Jewish Satanic worship.

The film also uses quotes from The Protocols of the Elders of Zion and Henry Ford's The International Jew, Holocaust denial, attacks on Zionism, and conspiracy theories about the Rothschild family. The film also includes quotes attributed to Adolf Hitler that appear to be fabricated. Another example is that the movie falsely attributes a quote to Harold Wallace Rosenthal about a Jewish conspiracy to control the media; the quote is from a fabricated interview with Rosenthal in the discredited pamphlet 'The Hidden Tyranny'.

== Controversy ==
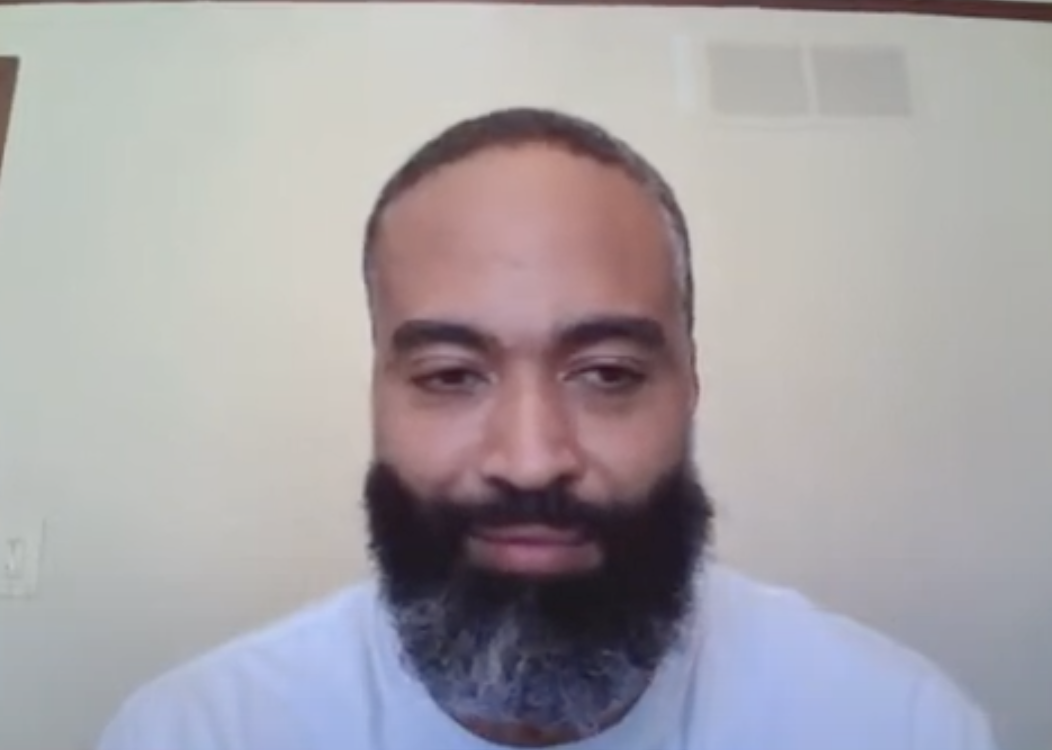
Director Ronald Dalton Jr. in 2021

In October 2022, Brooklyn Nets NBA basketball player Kyrie Irving tweeted a link to Hebrews to Negroes: Wake Up Black America. In two news conferences after he made the tweet, Irving refused to apologize and declined to disavow antisemitism or the Hebrews to Negroes film. On November 3, 2022, the Nets suspended Irving without pay. After his suspension, Irving tweeted an apology via Instagram, and agreed to donate "$500,000 to unspecified causes and organizations that combat hate". The Anti-Defamation League (ADL) rejected Irving's $500,000 donation; the group's CEO, Jonathan Greenblatt, said Irving had "failed at almost every step along the way to do the right thing, apologize and condemn antisemitism" and added: "We were optimistic but after watching the debacle of a press conference, it's clear that Kyrie feels no accountability for his actions." Irving's suspension was lifted on November 20, 2022, after he issued an apology, condemned hate speech and antisemitism, and said he had meant no harm.

In November 2022, major American Jewish organizations—including the ADL, American Jewish Committee, and Jewish Federations of North America—petitioned Amazon to stop distributing the Hebrews to Negroes book and film on its platform, writing, "By continuing to platform this film, and other clearly hateful content, Amazon is knowingly and willingly propagating antisemitism." Amazon's CEO Andy Jassy later announced that the company would refuse to pull the film or book from its website. The book had become a No. 1 seller in Amazon's "religion and spirituality" category. Amazon has rules prohibiting "derogatory comments, hate speech, or threats specifically targeting any group or individuals"; the company maintained that the film had been reviewed prior to being made available on its site, but it declined to provide the details of that review.

Citing what it called "Holocaust denial, dehumanization, and the promotion of antisemitic views and prejudicial language", the South African Film and Publication Board announced in November 2026 that it refused to classify the film, meaning that it is "prohibited from creation, possession and distribution is South Africa". The board said that the film "incites hatred and spreads dangerous misinformation", which effectively makes it illegal to distribute the film in the country, under penalty of law.

== See also ==
- African American–Jewish relations – Relations between Blacks and Jews in America
