= Kyrie Irving =

American basketball player (born 1992)

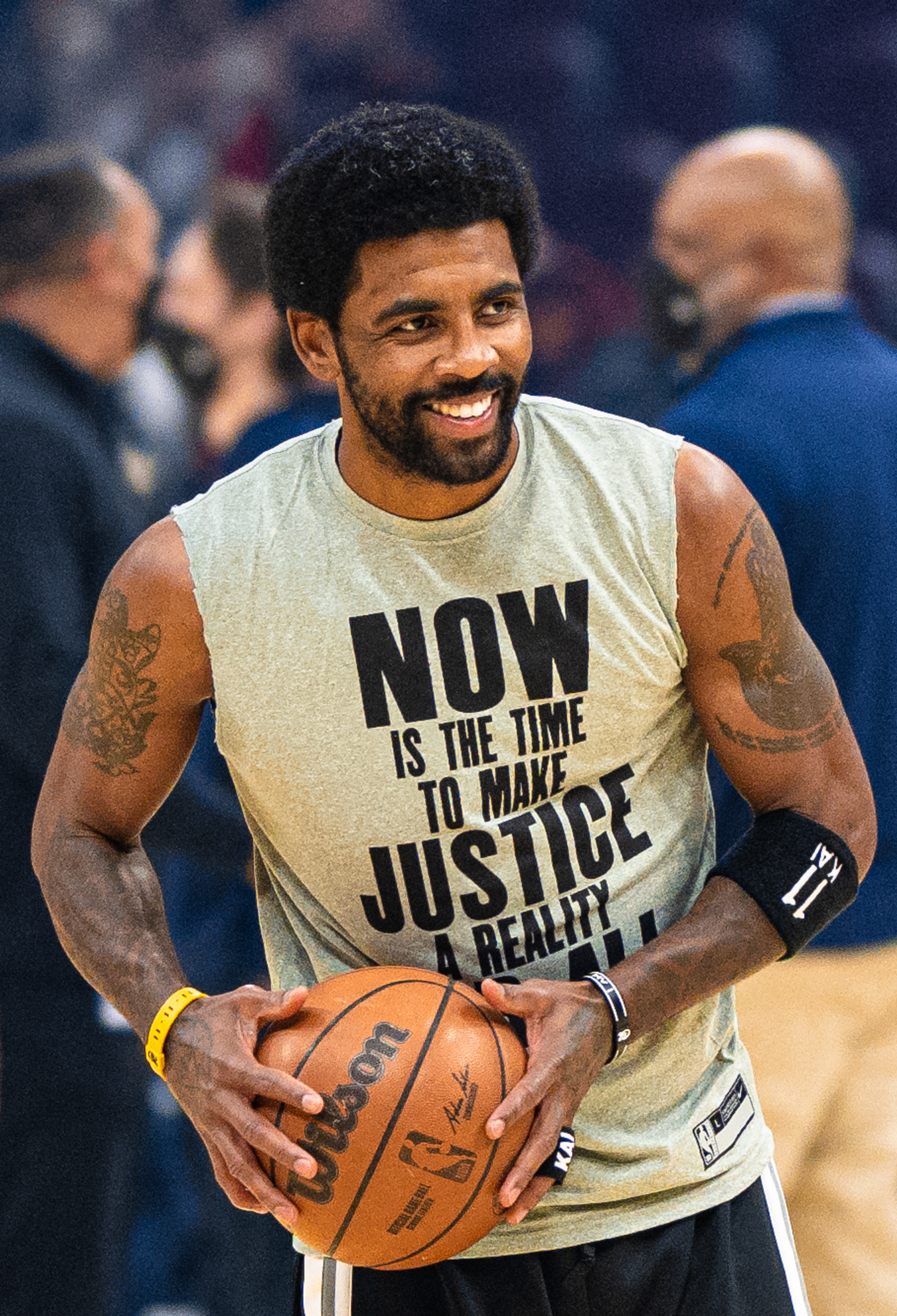
- Irving in 2022

No. 11 – Dallas Mavericks
- Position: Point guard
- League: NBA

Personal information
- Born: March 23, 1992 (age 34) Melbourne, Victoria, Australia
- Listed height: 6 ft 2 in (1.88 m)
- Listed weight: 195 lb (88 kg)

Career information
- High school: Montclair Kimberley Academy (Montclair, New Jersey); St. Patrick (Elizabeth, New Jersey)
- College: Duke (2010–2011)
- NBA draft: 2011: 1st round, 1st overall pick
- Drafted by: Cleveland Cavaliers
- Playing career: 2011–present

Career history
- 2011–2017: Cleveland Cavaliers
- 2017–2019: Boston Celtics
- 2019–2023: Brooklyn Nets
- 2023–present: Dallas Mavericks

Career highlights
- NBA champion (2016); 9× NBA All-Star (2013–2015, 2017–2019, 2021, 2023, 2025); NBA All-Star Game MVP (2014); All-NBA Second Team (2019); 2× All-NBA Third Team (2015, 2021); NBA Rookie of the Year (2012); NBA All-Rookie First Team (2012); NBA Three-Point Contest champion (2013); USA Basketball Male Athlete of the Year (2014); FIBA World Cup MVP (2014); McDonald's All-American (2010); First-team Parade All-American (2010)
- Stats at NBA.com
- Stats at Basketball Reference
Medals
Men's basketball
Representing the United States
Olympics
Gold medal – first place	2016 Rio de Janeiro	Team
World Cup
Gold medal – first place	2014 Spain	Team
FIBA Americas U18 Championship
Gold medal – first place	2010 San Antonio	Team

Kyrie Andrew Irving (/ˈkaɪri/ KY-ree; Lakota: Ȟéla, lit. 'Little Mountain'; born March 23, 1992) is an American professional basketball player for the Dallas Mavericks of the National Basketball Association (NBA). He was named the Rookie of the Year after being selected by the Cleveland Cavaliers with the first overall pick in the 2011 NBA draft. A nine-time All-Star and three-time member of the All-NBA Team, Irving won an NBA championship with the Cavaliers in 2016.

Irving played one year of college basketball for the Duke Blue Devils before joining the Cavaliers in 2011. He won the Most Valuable Player (MVP) award for the 2014 All-Star Game. In the 2016 NBA Finals, Irving made the championship-winning three-pointer to complete the Cavaliers' historic comeback over the Golden State Warriors. After another Finals appearance in 2017, Irving requested a trade and was dealt to the Boston Celtics. He played with the Celtics for two seasons, after which Irving signed with the Brooklyn Nets as a free agent in 2019. After four seasons with the Nets, he requested a trade and was dealt to the Dallas Mavericks in 2023, with whom Irving reached his fourth NBA Finals in 2024. He has also played for the United States national team, with which Irving won gold at the 2014 FIBA Basketball World Cup and the 2016 Summer Olympics. In February 2020, he was elected as one of the seven vice-presidents of the National Basketball Players Association, replacing Pau Gasol. Irving's decision not to get vaccinated for COVID-19 led to him missing the majority of the 2021–2022 NBA season.

Throughout his career, Irving has promoted numerous conspiracy theories. Some of these conspiracies, including tweeting a link to the film Hebrews to Negroes: Wake Up Black America (2018), have been characterized as antisemitic. For a time prior, Irving promoted a theory that the Earth is flat, which he later recanted.

Irving has written, directed, and acted in a number of advertisements as "Uncle Drew", which became a feature film in 2018. He has starred as himself in Kickin' It (2012) and has done voicework in We Bare Bears (2016) and Family Guy (2018).

== Early life ==
Irving was born in Melbourne, Australia, on March 23, 1992; the son of Drederick Irving and Elizabeth (née Larson) Irving, American expatriates. He has an older sister, Asia, and a younger half-sister, London. Drederick played college basketball at Boston University alongside Shawn Teague (father of Jeff and Marquis Teague). After completing his college career, Irving's father moved to Australia to play professionally for the Bulleen Boomers in the South East Australian Basketball League (SEABL). Irving and his family lived in the Melbourne suburb of Kew before relocating to the United States when he was two years old. Irving holds dual American and Australian citizenship. Kyrie is ambidextrous.

Irving's mother, who was African American and Lakota, died of an illness when he was four, and Drederick raised Irving along with the help of Irving's aunts. In 2004, Drederick remarried to Shetellia Riley, who is currently Kyrie Irving's agent.

Irving grew up in West Orange, New Jersey, where he frequently attended his father's adult-league games. Irving's inspiration to play in the NBA came after playing at Continental Airlines Arena during a school trip in fourth grade, when he declared, "I will play in the NBA, I promise." Due to his father's connection to Boston University, Irving spent a lot of time in Boston, including at BU's basketball skills camp. Irving said that in the fifth grade, he was offered a scholarship to Boston University by then-head coach Dennis Wolff. As a teenager, Irving played for the Road Runners of the Amateur Athletic Union (AAU).

== High school career ==
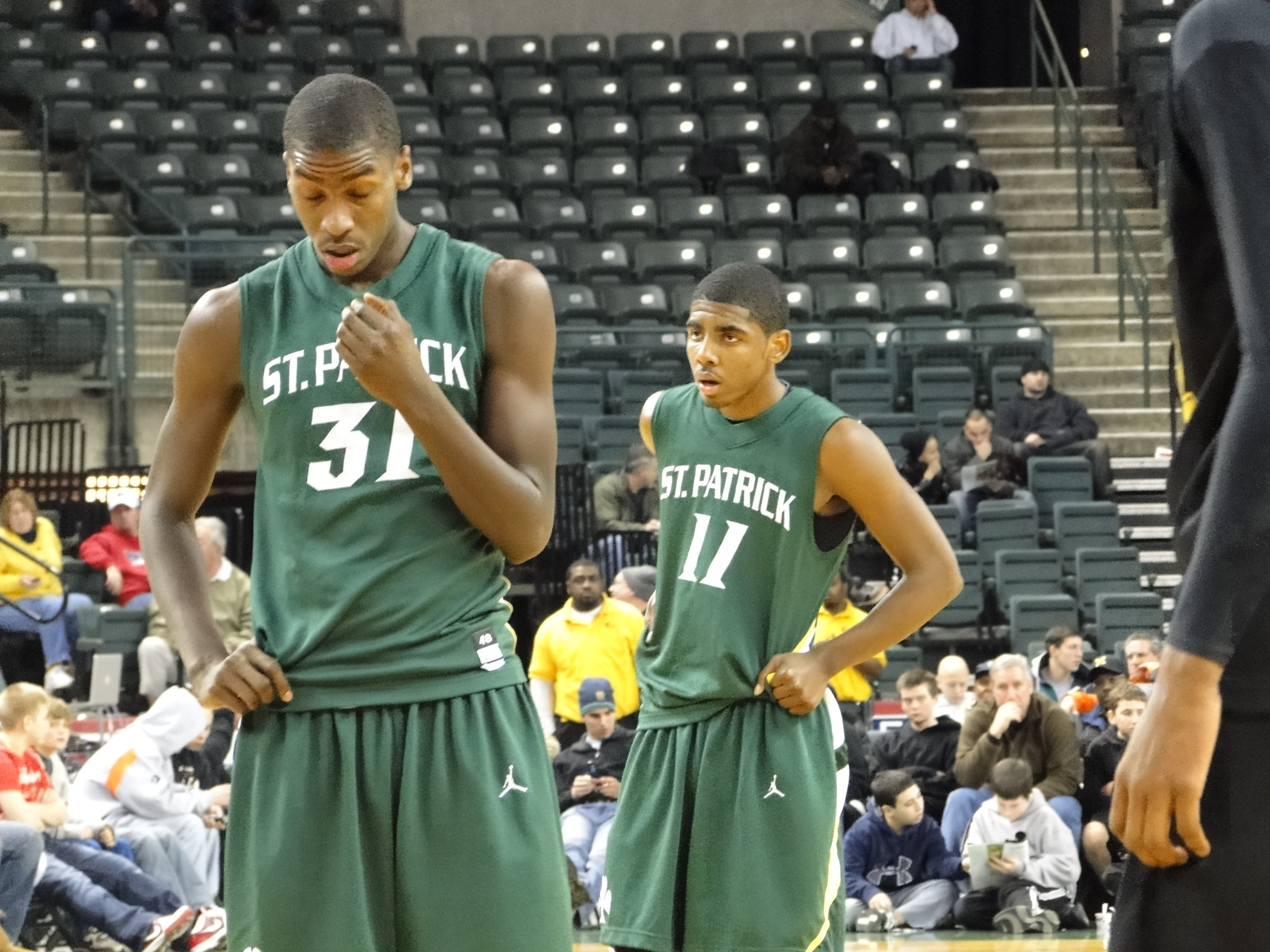
Irving behind high school teammate and future NBA forward Michael Kidd-Gilchrist

Irving played for Montclair Kimberley Academy during his freshman and sophomore years in high school. Irving averaged 26.5 points, 10.3 assists, 4.8 rebounds, and 3.6 steals and became only the second 1,000 point scorer in the school's history. In his sophomore year, Irving led MKA to its first New Jersey Prep 'B' state title. After that year, he transferred to St. Patrick High School but had to sit out the first 30 days of the season due to the transfer. At St. Patrick, Irving played with Michael Kidd-Gilchrist, who was widely regarded as one of the best players in the class of 2011.

In his first season, Irving averaged 17.0 points, 5.0 rebounds, 6.0 assists, and 2.0 steals per game, and led the team to its third New Jersey Tournament of Champions title in four years. In August 2009, he led the USA East to the tournament title in the Nike Global Challenge. Irving was the MVP with 21.3 points and 4.3 assists per game. The next year, St. Patrick was banned from the state tournament for holding practice prior to the permitted start of the winter sports season. St. Patrick went 24–3 and won the Union County Tournament championship as Irving finished his senior year with 24.0 points, 5.0 rebounds and 7.0 assists per game.

On January 19, 2010, Irving was selected to the 2010 Junior National Select Team. The team played at the 2010 Nike Hoop Summit at the Rose Garden in Portland, Oregon, on April 10. He was also selected to play in the 2010 McDonald's All-American Game and the 2010 Jordan Brand Classic, where Irving was named co-MVP with Harrison Barnes. In June 2010, Irving was a part of the United States gold medal-winning team at the FIBA Americas Under-18 Championship.

College recruiting
Name	Hometown	School	Height	Weight	Commit date
Kyrie Irving; PG	West Orange, New Jersey	Montclair Kimberley Academy / St. Patrick	6 ft 2 in (1.88 m)	175 lb (79 kg)	Oct 22, 2009
Kyrie Irving; PG	Recruit ratings: Scout: Rivals: 247Sports: (97)				
Overall recruit ranking: Scout: 2 (PG); 8 (school) Rivals: 2 (PG); 4 (national)
Note: In many cases, Scout, Rivals, 247Sports, On3, and ESPN may conflict in their listings of height and weight.; In these cases, the average was taken. ESPN grades are on a 100-point scale.; Sources: "2010 Duke Basketball Commitment List". Rivals.; "2010 Duke College Basketball Team Recruiting Prospects". Scout.; "Duke Blue Devils 2010 Player Commits". ESPN.; "Scout.com Team Recruiting Rankings". Scout.; "2010 Team Ranking". Rivals.

== College career ==
Irving committed to Duke on October 22, 2009, in a television broadcast on ESPNU. He played with the Blue Devils during the 2010–2011 basketball season under the guidance of head coach Mike Krzyzewski. Through the first eight games of the season, Irving averaged 17.4 points per game on 53.2% shooting, 5.1 assists, 3.8 rebounds and 1.5 steals.

Irving was a strong contender for NCAA Freshman of the Year until suffering an injury to his right big toe during the ninth game of the season. On March 17, the day before Duke played Hampton in the first round of the NCAA tournament, Irving returned for his first game since his injury.

Duke advanced to the Sweet Sixteen of the NCAA Tournament but fell to Arizona. Irving scored 28 points in what turned out to be his last game for Duke.

== Professional career ==
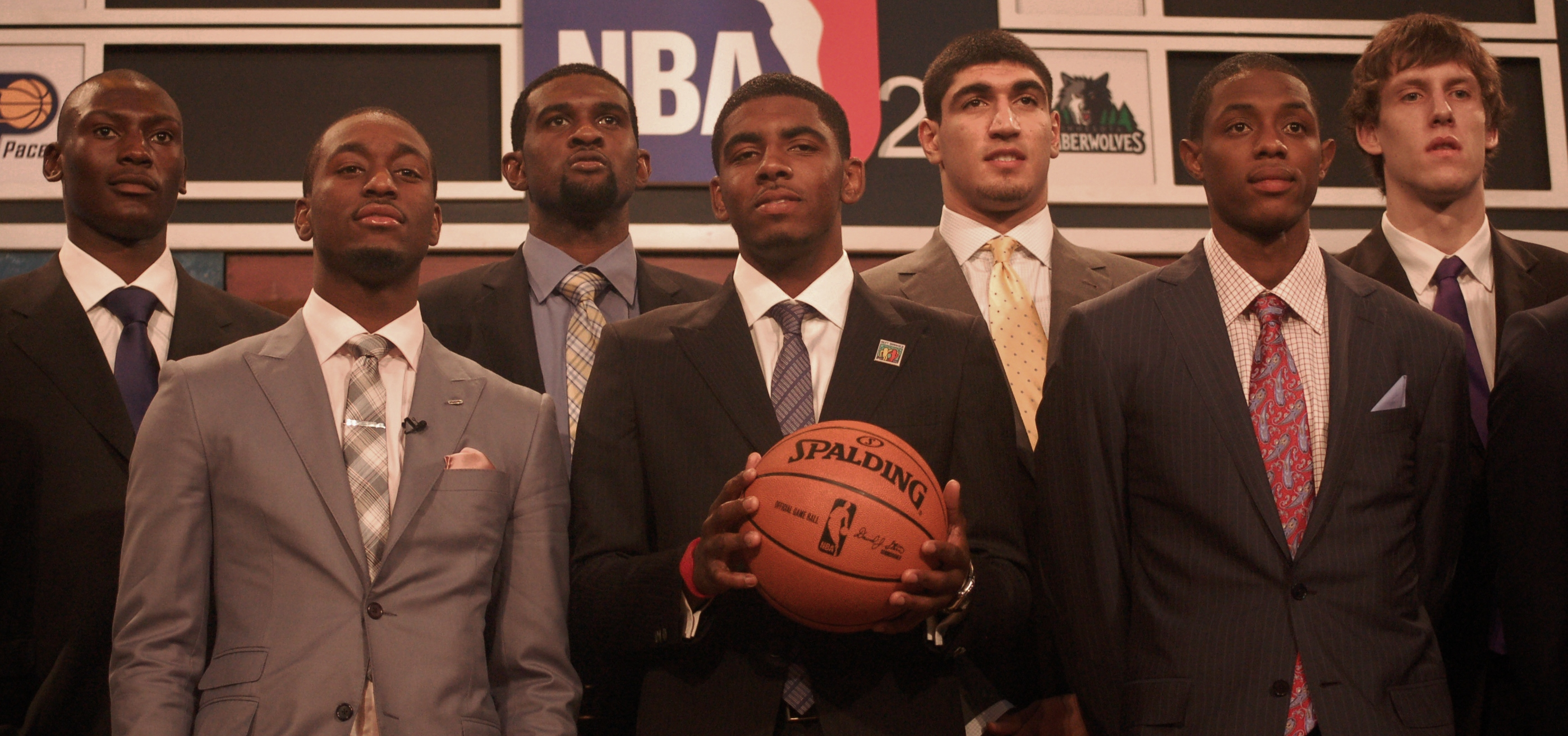
Irving (with ball) at the 2011 NBA draft with other draftees

=== Cleveland Cavaliers (2011–2017) ===
==== 2011–2012: Rookie of the Year ====
Irving announced that he would forgo his final three seasons of eligibility and enter the 2011 NBA draft, where Irving was selected with the first overall pick by the Cleveland Cavaliers. He was named to the 2012 Rising Stars Challenge, where he played for Team Chuck. Irving scored 34 points in the game, going 8-of-8 from three-point range, and earned MVP honors. He also won the 2012 NBA Rookie of the Year Award with 117 of a possible 120 first-place votes. Irving was the only unanimous selection to the NBA All-Rookie First Team. For the season, he averaged 18.5 points, 5.4 assists and shot 46.9% from the field, including 39.9% on three-pointers.

==== 2012–2013: First All-Star appearance ====
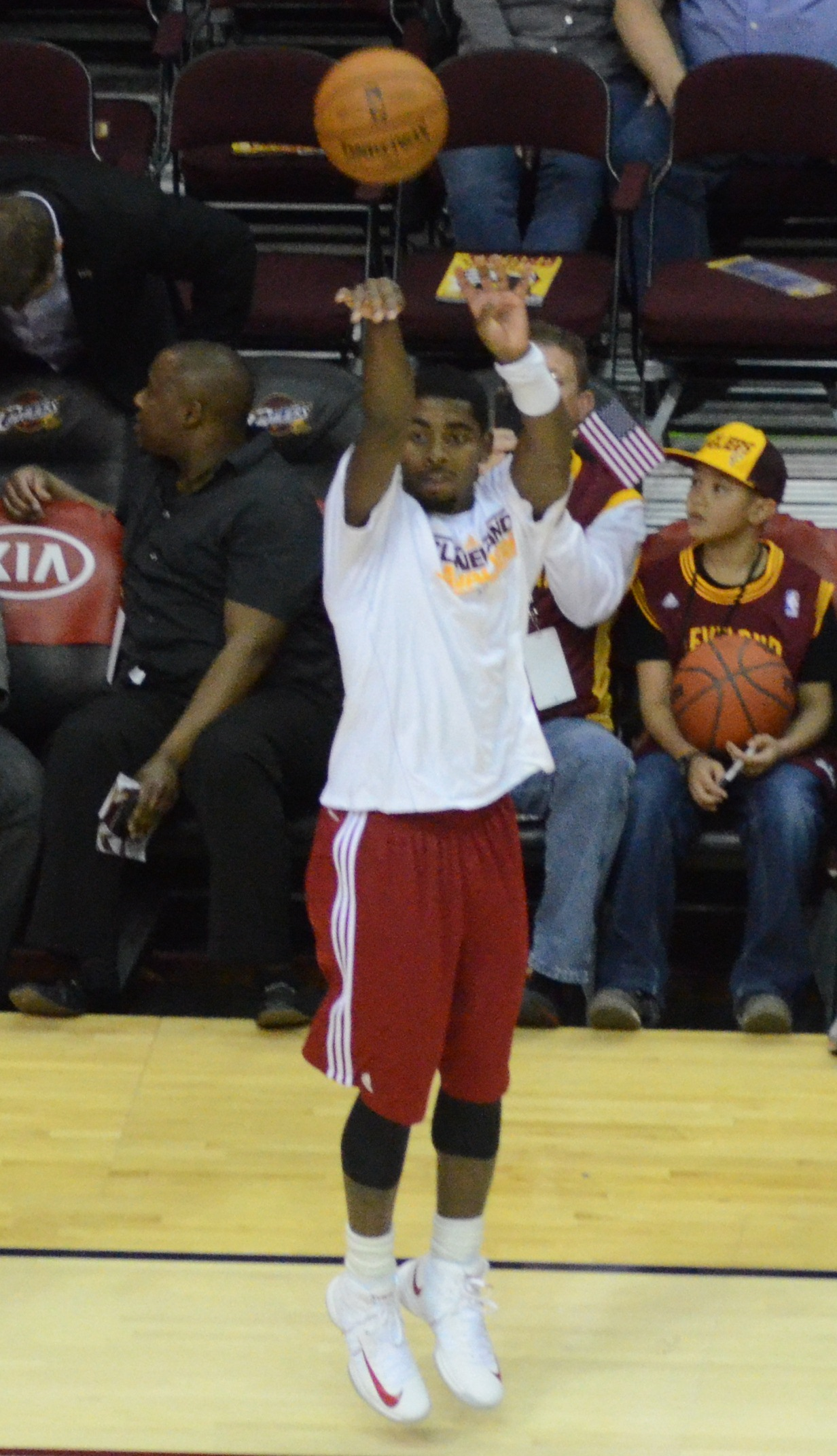
Irving during warm-ups in 2012

While practicing with the Cavaliers in the NBA Summer League on July 14, 2012, Irving sustained a broken right hand after reportedly slapping it against a padded wall after committing a turnover. "I am a little disappointed," he said. "I have to be more responsible about my health. It was just crazy. It happened so fast." Four days later, it was announced that Irving would require hand surgery.

At the start of the 2012–2013 NBA season, Irving injured his index finger in a loss to the Dallas Mavericks. He played in the Cavaliers' next game, but the injury forced Irving to miss three weeks of action. In his second game back, while donning a black protective face mask to protect a broken bone he suffered against Milwaukee, Irving scored his then-career-high 41 points against the New York Knicks. He became the youngest player in NBA history to score 40 points in Madison Square Garden; Irving was a year younger than Michael Jordan, who did it in 1985.

The coaches selected Irving to play in his first All-Star game. Irving finished with 15 points, four assists, and three rebounds. He also participated in the Rising Stars Challenge again, scoring 32 points for Team Shaq in a losing effort. Irving participated in the Three-Point Contest and recorded 23 points in the final round to win the event. He ended his second season with averages of 22.5 points, 5.9 assists, 3.7 rebounds, and 1.5 steals per game.

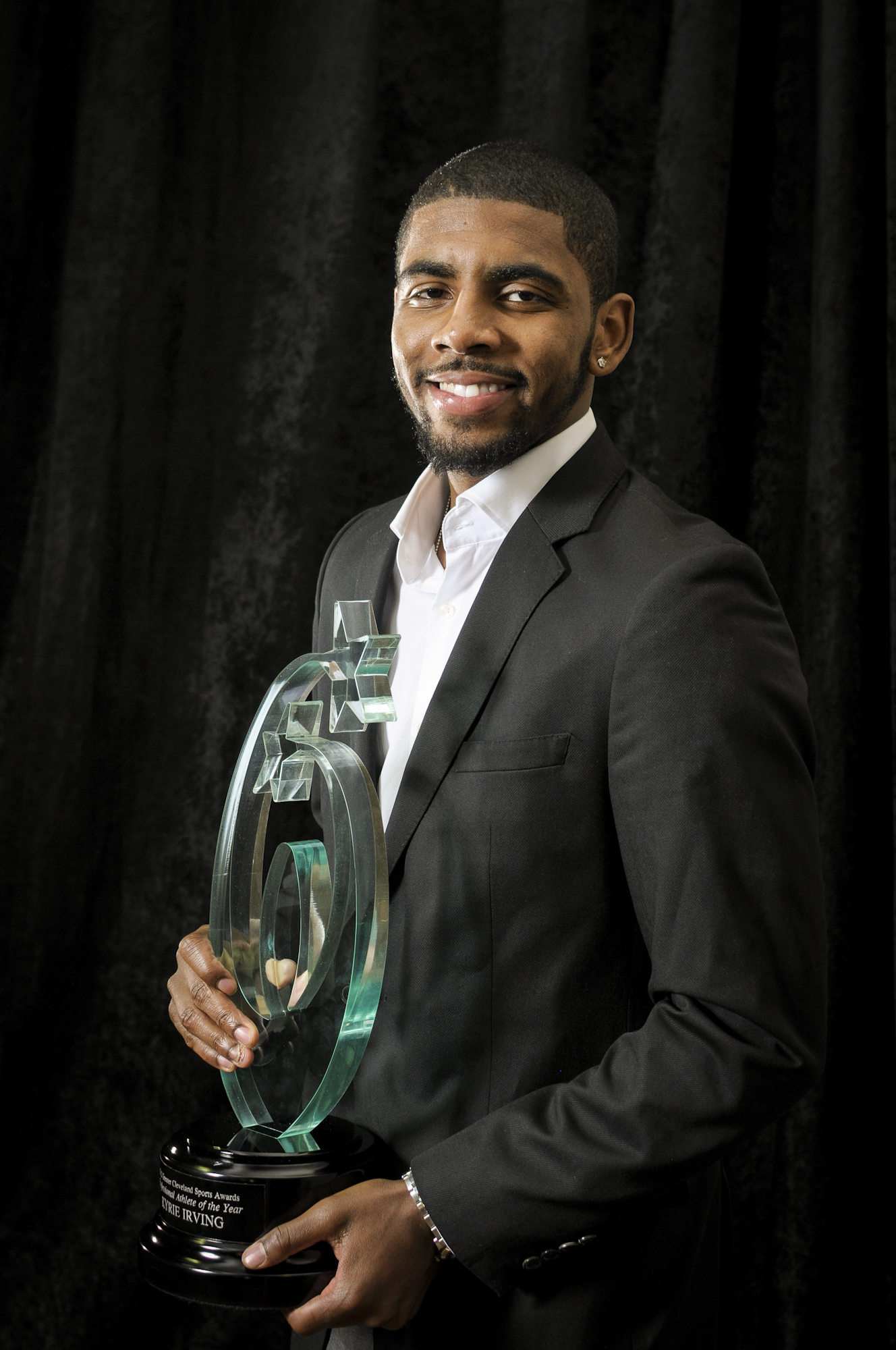
Irving at the Greater Cleveland Sports Awards in January 2013

==== 2013–2014: All-Star Game MVP ====
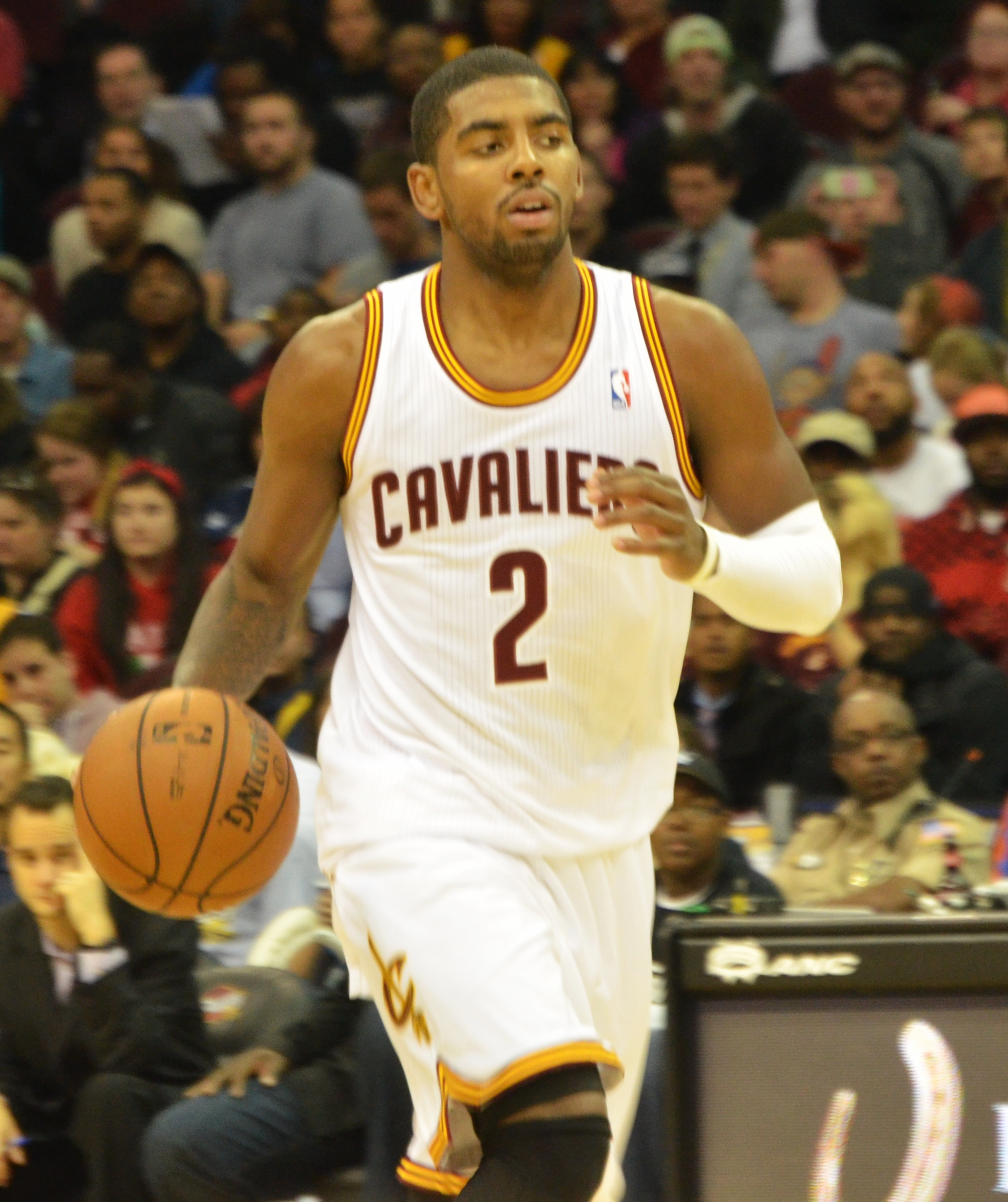
Irving in October 2013

Fans chose Irving to be the starting point guard for the Eastern Conference in the 2014 NBA All-Star game. He was the All-Star game MVP, recording 31 points and 14 assists as the East beat the West 163–155.

On February 28, 2014, Irving recorded his first career triple-double with 21 points, 12 assists and 10 rebounds in a 99–79 victory over the Utah Jazz. This was also the Cavaliers' first triple-double since March 16, 2010. On April 5, 2014, Irving recorded a then career-high 44 points in a 96–94 overtime loss to the Charlotte Bobcats. He averaged 20.8 points, 6.1 assists, 3.6 rebounds, and 1.5 steals on the season.

==== 2014–2015: Big Three formation and first NBA Finals ====
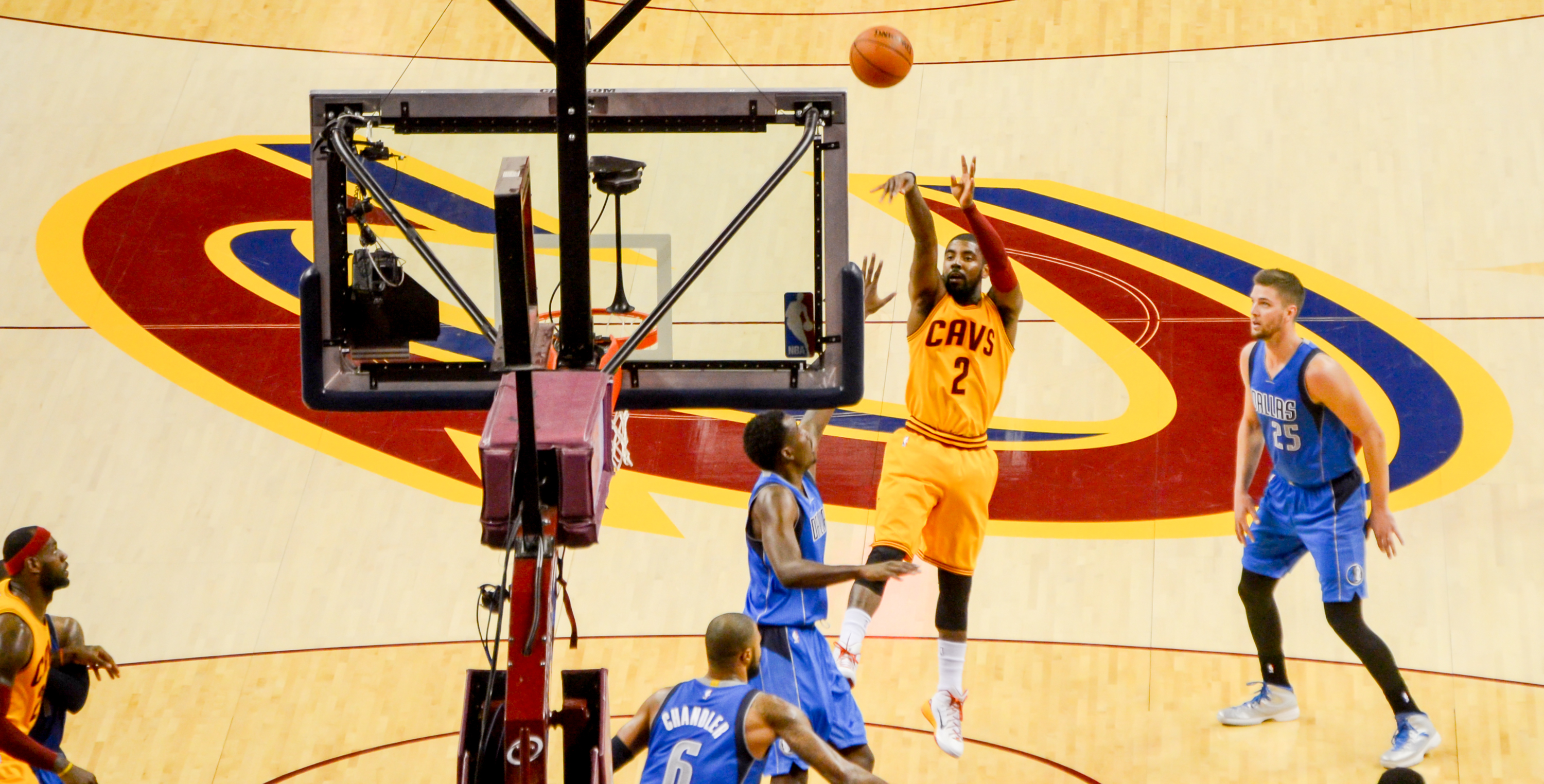
Irving shoots a jump shot vs the Dallas Mavericks in 2014

On July 10, 2014, Irving signed a five-year, $90 million contract extension with the Cavaliers. His contract extension came in the wake of LeBron James's return to Cleveland and Kevin Love's trade request from Minnesota, as the trio teamed up to start a new "Big Three" in Cleveland. After a shaky start to the season, where they fell to a 5–7 record after a November 22 loss to Toronto, the Cavaliers went on an eight-game winning streak, where Irving averaged 19.3 points per game, including a 37-point game against the New York Knicks on December 4.

After their streak-ending loss on December 11 to Oklahoma City, the Cavaliers went on to win just five more games in December, finishing 2014 at 18–14. All of the new Big Three missed time during December, contributing to the team's inconsistency and mediocre play. The Cavaliers began their 2015 schedule on January 2 as they snapped a three-game losing streak with Irving's help. He scored 23 points, and with Love's 27, the Cavaliers defeated the Charlotte Hornets 91–87. The next game against Dallas two days later, was a season low for Irving, who scored just six points before leaving in the third quarter with lower back tightness; the Cavaliers lost 109–90. Irving missed the following game against Philadelphia, before returning to action on January 7 against Houston to tie a then first-half career high of 23 points. He finished the game with a then season-high 38 points, but could not lead the Cavaliers to a win as they lost 105–93, the team's seventh loss in nine games.

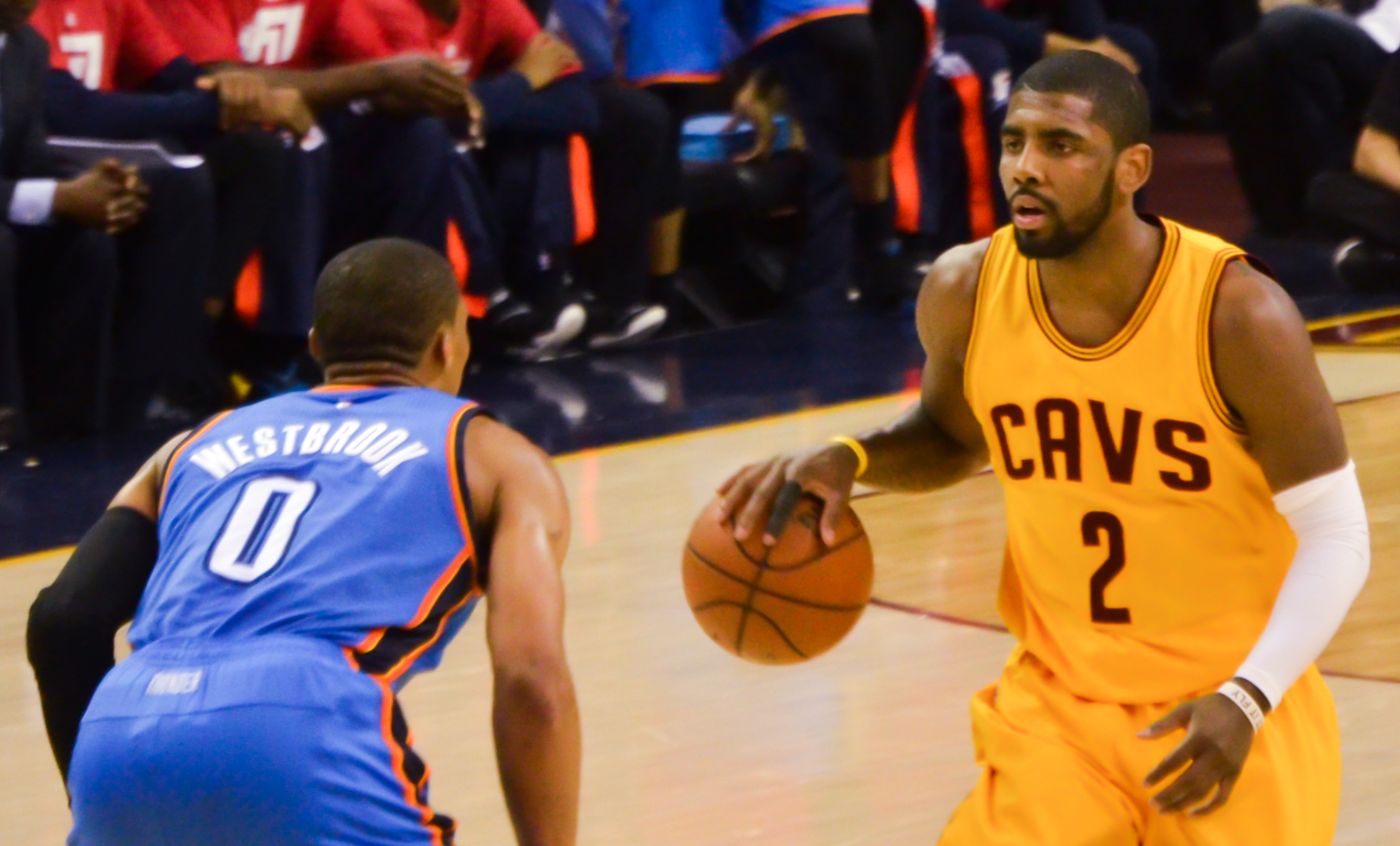
Irving against Russell Westbrook in 2015

After a six-game losing streak between January 4 and 13 dropped the Cavaliers to 19–20, Irving and James led them on a 12-game winning streak to bring them back into contention. During the streak, Irving averaged 24.5 points per game, including a then career-high 55 points on January 28 against Portland. His 11 three-pointers in that game set a Cavaliers franchise record while his 55 points were the second-most in Cavaliers history (behind James's 56) and the most scored in a home game, as well as the most points scored in Quicken Loans Arena history. Irving's 28 first-half points also set a new career high for points in a half.

On March 12, 2015, Irving scored a career-high 57 points, including a buzzer-beating three-point shot to send the Cavaliers into overtime, in a 128–125 victory over the San Antonio Spurs. It was the most points for a player in a regular-season game against the defending champion since January 14, 1962, when Wilt Chamberlain scored 62 points for the Philadelphia Warriors in a loss to the Boston Celtics. The effort also surpassed the Cavaliers' franchise single-game scoring mark of 56 points, set by LeBron James against the Toronto Raptors on March 3, 2005.

Irving helped the Cavaliers win 34 of their final 43 games to finish the regular season as the No. 2 seed in the Eastern Conference with a 53–29 record. In his first career playoff game on April 19, Irving scored 30 points in a 113–100 victory over the Boston Celtics in Game 1 of their first-round playoff matchup. He went on to help the Cavaliers reach the NBA Finals for just the second time in franchise history despite missing two games in the Eastern Conference Finals against the Atlanta Hawks with a knee injury. After leaving Game 1 of the NBA Finals against the Golden State Warriors in the overtime period with a knee injury, Irving was ruled out for the rest of the series the following day with a fractured left kneecap that required surgery, sidelining him for three to four months. The Cavaliers eventually lost the series in six games despite a 2–1 lead.

==== 2015–2016: NBA championship ====
On August 27, 2015, Irving was ruled unlikely to be ready for opening night of the 2015–16 season due to the left kneecap fracture he suffered in Game 1 of the 2015 NBA Finals. Irving made his season debut on December 20, scoring 12 points in 17 minutes as a starter against the Philadelphia 76ers. On January 6, he scored a season-high 32 points in a 121–115 victory over the Washington Wizards. On February 8, Irving tied his season high of 32 points and tied his career high of 12 assists in a 120–100 victory over the Sacramento Kings. Two days later, Irving topped his season high mark with 35 points in a 120–111 victory over the Los Angeles Lakers.

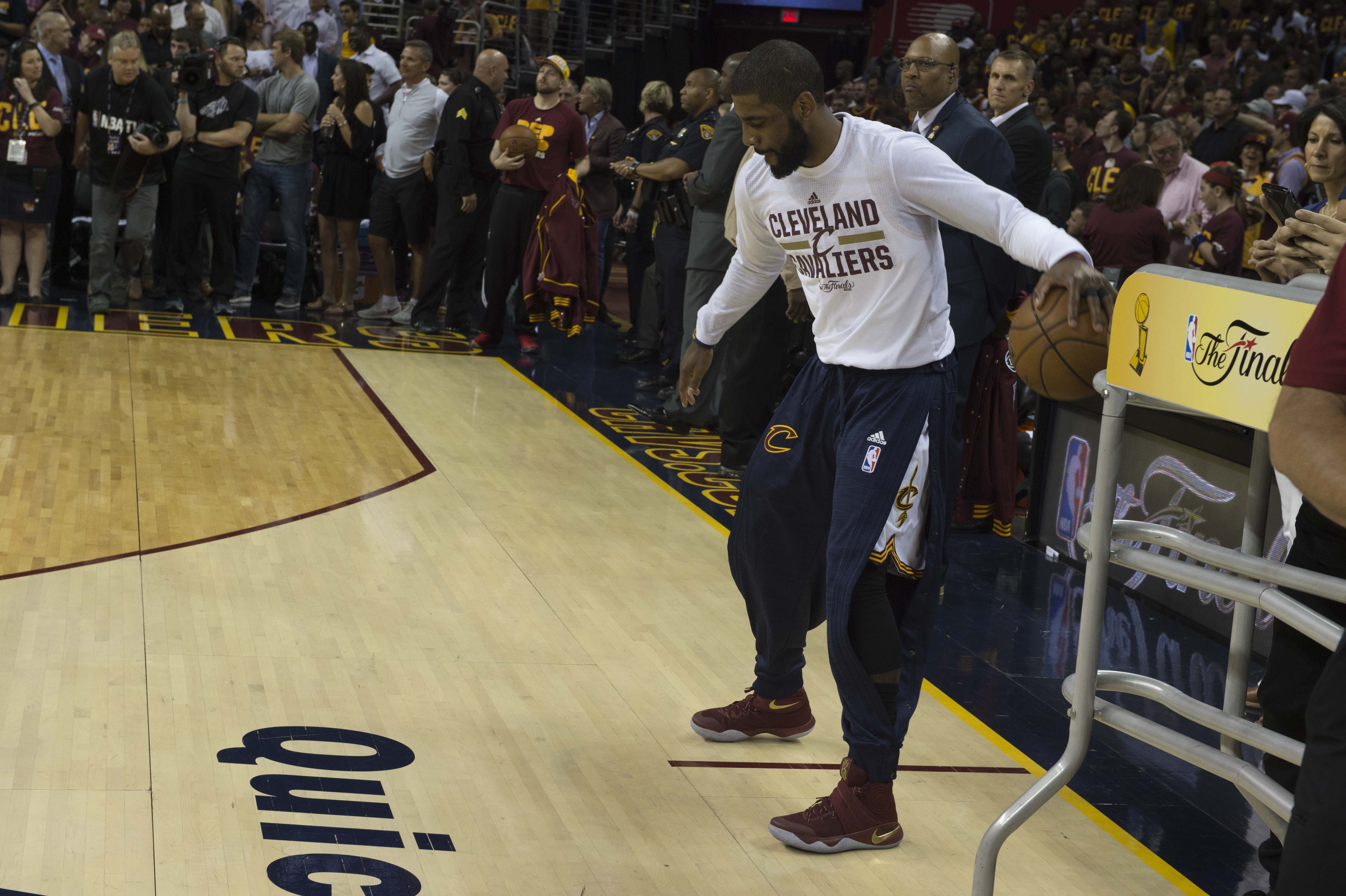
Irving during warm-ups prior to Game 4 of the 2016 NBA Finals in Cleveland

The Cavaliers finished the regular season as the top seed in the Eastern Conference with a 57–25 record. In the first round of the playoffs, they faced the eighth-seeded Detroit Pistons, and in a Game 1 win on April 17, Irving scored a playoff career-high 31 points. He tied that mark with another 31-point game in Game 4 of the series, helping the Cavaliers sweep the Pistons. The Cavaliers went on to breeze through the Eastern Conference playoffs with a 12–2 record to reach the 2016 NBA Finals, where they faced Golden State for the second straight year. Irving struggled with his shot in his debut Finals game, going 7-of-22 from the field for 26 points, as the Cavaliers were defeated 104–89 in Game 1. Facing a 3–1 deficit following a Game 4 loss, Irving and LeBron James took over in Game 5, each scoring 41 points to lead the Cavaliers to a 112–97 victory, forcing a Game 6. Irving and James became the first teammates to each score 40 points in an NBA Finals game. In Game 7, Irving hit a three-pointer with 53 seconds left in the game that propelled the Cavaliers to a 92–89 lead and an eventual 93–89 victory. The Cavaliers won the series 4–3 and became the first team to rally from a 3–1 Finals deficit, ending a 52-year major sports championship drought in Cleveland.

==== 2016–2017: Back-to-back chase ====
On October 25, 2016, after receiving his first championship ring prior to the season opener, Irving scored a game-high 29 points in a 117–88 victory over the New York Knicks. Three days later, he scored 26 points and hit a go-ahead three-pointer with 44.3 seconds remaining to lift the Cavaliers to a 94–91 victory over the Toronto Raptors. On November 27, Irving scored 19 of his then-season-high 39 points in the fourth quarter of the Cavaliers' 112–108 victory over the Philadelphia 76ers. On December 5, he had a career-high 10th straight game with at least 20 points, finishing with 24 points in a 116–112 victory over the Toronto Raptors. On December 21, Irving had 31 points and a career-high 13 assists in a 113–102 victory over the Milwaukee Bucks. On January 23, 2017, he scored 35 of his season-high 49 points in the second half of the Cavaliers' narrow 124–122 loss to the New Orleans Pelicans—their fifth loss in seven games. On February 1, Irving set a new career high with 14 assists in a 125–97 win over the Minnesota Timberwolves. On March 3, he had a 43-point effort in a 135–130 win over the Atlanta Hawks. In the game, the Cavaliers set the NBA regular-season record with 25 three-pointers. On March 19, Irving had a 46-point effort in a 125–120 win over the Los Angeles Lakers. On April 9, he had a 45-point effort in a narrow 126–125 overtime loss to Atlanta.

In Game 4 of the Eastern Conference Finals against the Boston Celtics, Irving scored a playoff career-high 42 points to lead the Cavaliers to a 112–99 victory, taking a 3–1 lead in the series. With 24 points in Game 5 of the series, he helped the Cavaliers defeat the Celtics 135–102 to claim their third straight Eastern Conference title and a return trip to the NBA Finals. After going down 3–0 in the 2017 NBA Finals, Irving scored 40 points in Game 4 to help Cleveland extend the series and avoid a sweep with a 137–116 victory over the Golden State Warriors. However, the Cavaliers went on to lose to the Warriors in Game 5, losing the series 4–1.

=== Boston Celtics (2017–2019) ===
==== 2017–2018: Season-ending injury ====
In July 2017, Irving requested the Cavaliers to trade him, reportedly wanting to be more of the focal point of his own team instead of continuing to play alongside LeBron James. The following month, on August 22, he was traded to the Boston Celtics in exchange for Isaiah Thomas, Jae Crowder, Ante Žižić, and the rights to the Brooklyn Nets' 2018 first-round draft pick (that ultimately turned into Collin Sexton). Eight days later, the Celtics agreed to send the Cavaliers a 2020 second-round draft pick via the Miami Heat to complete the trade, as compensation for Thomas' failed physical.

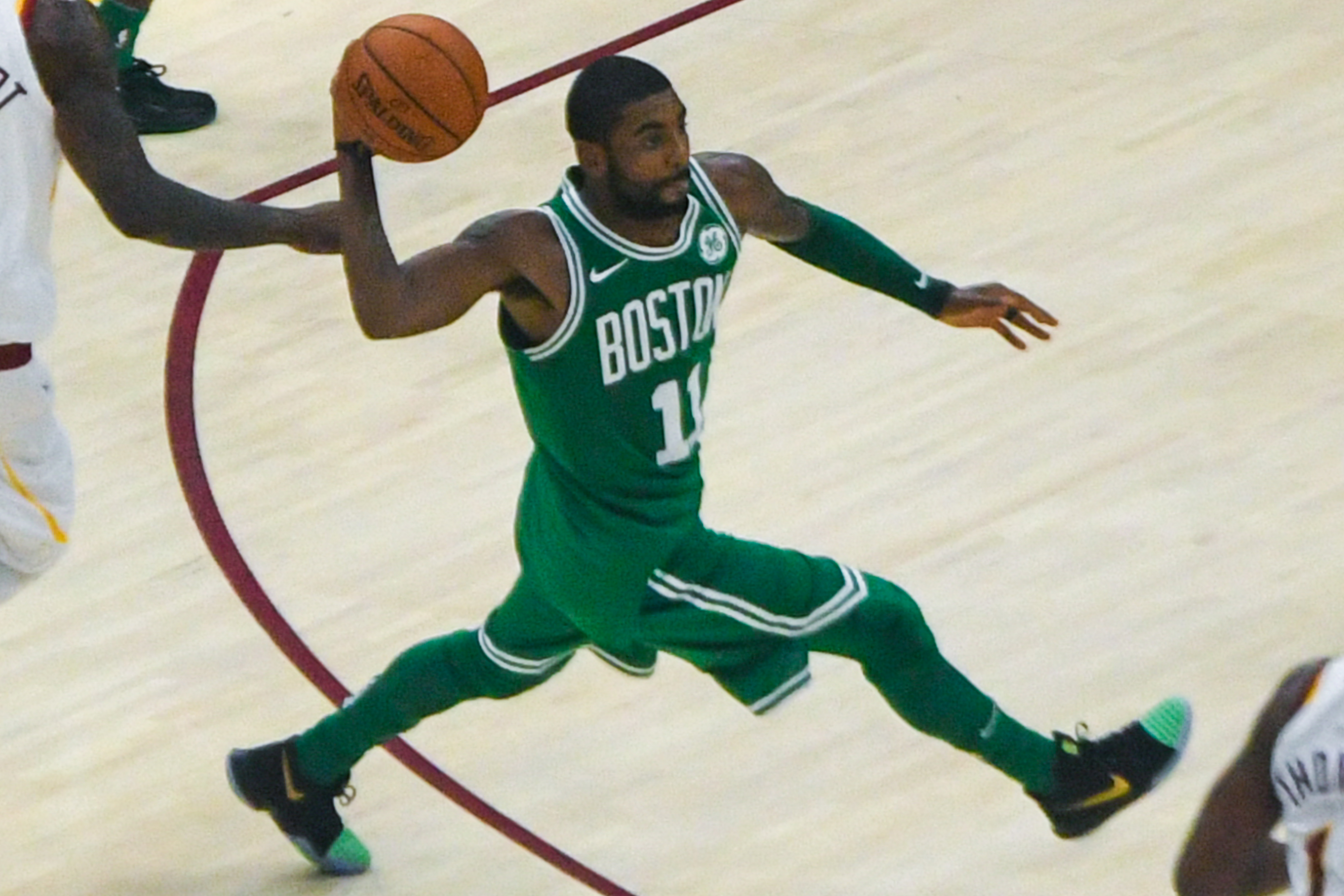
Irving in his debut for the Celtics against his former team, the Cavaliers

In his debut for the Celtics in their season opener against the Cavaliers on October 17, 2017, Irving had 22 points and 10 assists in a 102–99 loss. He had a chance to tie it with a three-pointer at the buzzer but missed. On October 30, Irving scored 24 points for the third straight game in helping the Celtics beat the San Antonio Spurs 108–94. It was the Celtics' first victory against the Spurs since 2011. Irving's 128 points in his first six games as a Celtic were the most since Kevin Garnett and Ray Allen each had 131 in 2007. On November 6, 2017, Irving scored 35 points in a 110–107 victory over the Atlanta Hawks, recording his first 30-point game as a Celtic while scoring more points (245) than any player in his first 11 games with Boston. With the win over Atlanta, the Celtics improved to 9–2 with nine straight wins, setting their longest winning streak in seven years.

On November 20, 2017, Irving scored 10 of his season-high 47 points in overtime as the Celtics rallied from a double-digit deficit to beat the Dallas Mavericks 110–102, extending their winning streak to 16 games. The streak ended at 16 games with a loss to the Miami Heat two days later. On January 21, 2018, Irving scored 40 points in a 103–95 loss to the Orlando Magic. The Celtics had accumulated a 34–10 record by mid-January, but their loss to Orlando was their season-worst third straight defeat. On January 27, he scored 37 points on 13-for-18 shooting with five three-pointers in a 109–105 loss to the Golden State Warriors. On February 28, Irving helped the Celtics improve to 4–0 following the All-Star break with a 134–106 victory over the Charlotte Hornets. Irving led Boston with 34 points, making 13 of 18 shots overall and going 4-for-6 from three-point range in the first three quarters. On March 24, he was ruled out for three to six weeks after undergoing a minimally-invasive procedure to remove a tension wire in his left knee. Less than two weeks later, Irving was ruled out for the entire postseason, with a recovery time of four to five months, after another procedure was scheduled to remove two screws from his patella that were inserted in 2015 to repair a fracture he suffered during that year's NBA Finals. Without Irving, Boston would reach the Conference Finals, before losing to his former team, the Cavaliers, in seven games.

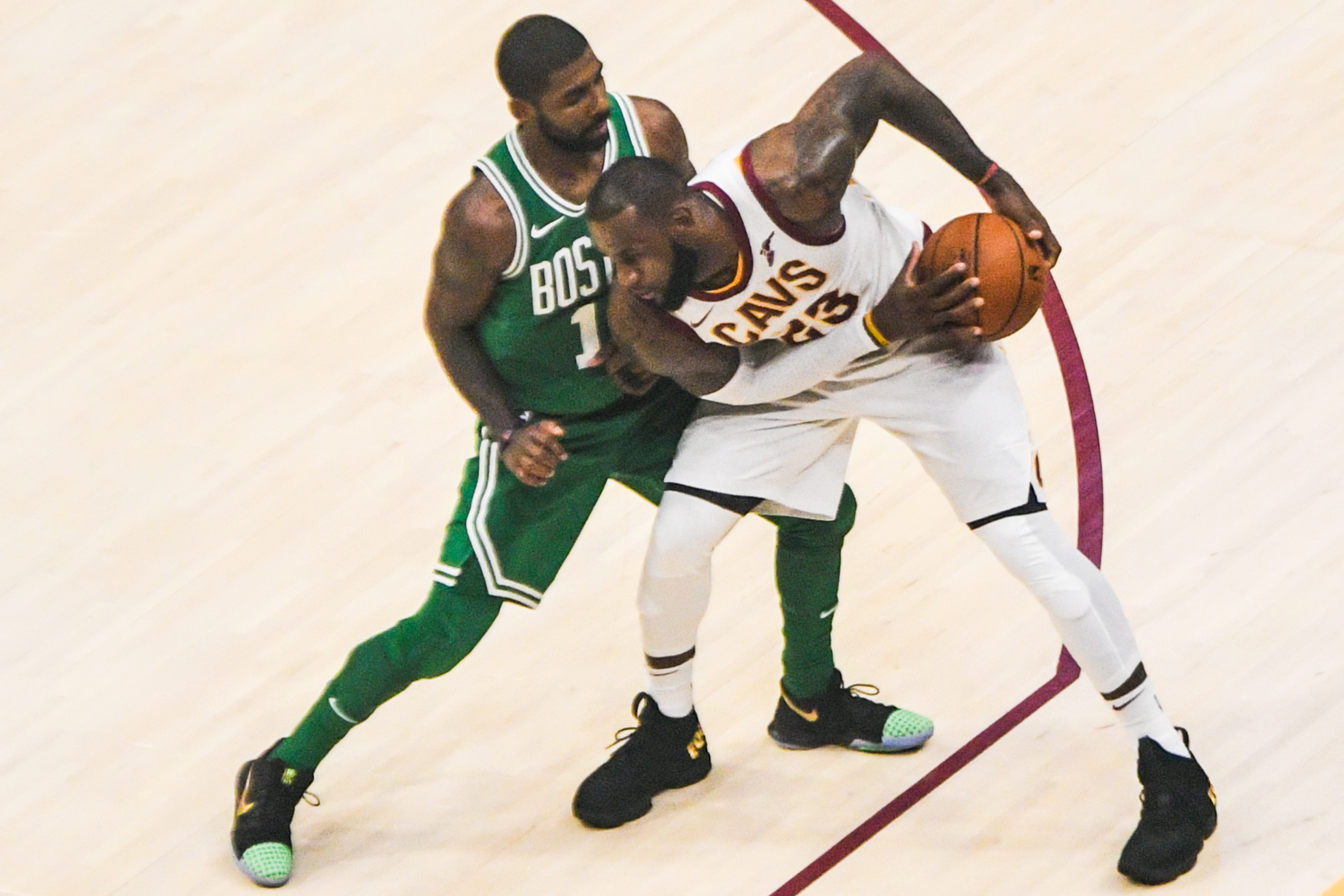
Irving guarding former teammate LeBron James in October 2017

==== 2018–2019: All-NBA Second Team selection ====
In the Celtics' season opener on October 16, Irving played in his first game since March and had seven points and seven assists in a 105–87 victory over the Philadelphia 76ers. Irving missed his first nine attempts from the field and did not score until finally connecting on a pair of free throws early in the third quarter. On October 30, after averaging 14 points through the first six games, he scored 31 points in a 108–105 victory over the Detroit Pistons. On November 8, Irving scored 18 of his then-season-high 39 points in the fourth quarter and overtime of the Celtics' 116–109 victory over the Phoenix Suns. On November 16, he recorded a season-high 43 points and 11 assists in a 123–116 overtime victory over the Toronto Raptors. It marked Irving's first ever game scoring at least 40 points with 10 or more assists, and became the first Celtics player to do so since Antoine Walker in 2001. On December 12, Irving scored 38 points in a 130–125 overtime victory over the Washington Wizards. On December 25, he recorded 40 points and 10 rebounds in a 121–114 overtime win over the 76ers. On December 29, he scored 22 of his 26 points in the second half of the Celtics' 112–103 win over the Memphis Grizzlies. Irving's 13 assists matched his season best and was one short of his career high. On January 16, 2019, Irving recorded 27 points and a career-high 18 assists in a 117–108 victory over the Raptors.

On January 21, Irving had a career-high eight steals in a 107–99 win over the Miami Heat. Five days later, he recorded 32 points and 10 assists in a 115–111 loss to the Golden State Warriors. It was Irving's 11th double-double with points and assists, becoming the first Celtic with 11 of that kind of double-double since Larry Bird in 1986–87. It was also Irving's sixth straight game with at least 25 points, matching the longest such streak in his career. On March 14, he recorded his second career triple-double with 31 points, 12 assists, and 10 rebounds in a 126–120 victory over the Sacramento Kings, becoming the first Celtics player to record 30-plus points and a triple-double in the same game since Rajon Rondo in February 2012. Two days later, Irving had 30 points, 11 rebounds and nine assists in a 129–120 win over the Atlanta Hawks. In his first playoff game as a Celtic, Irving became just third player in franchise history (joining Isaiah Thomas in 2015 and Jo Jo White in 1972) to have 20-plus points, five-plus assists and five-plus rebounds in his postseason debut with the team, helping Boston defeat the Indiana Pacers 84–74 in game one of their first-round series. In Game 2 of the series, Irving scored 37 points in a 99–91 victory. In Game 1 of the second round, Irving had 26 points and a playoff career high-tying 11 assists in a 112–90 victory over the Milwaukee Bucks. The Celtics would lose the next four games and the series to the Bucks.

=== Brooklyn Nets (2019–2023) ===
==== 2019–2020: Debut and injury ====
On July 7, 2019, Irving signed with the Brooklyn Nets in free agency on a four-year, $136.5 million contract. On October 23, 2019, he debuted for the Nets with 50 points, eight rebounds, and seven assists in a 127–126 overtime loss to the Minnesota Timberwolves, becoming the first player in NBA history to score 50 points or more in a team debut. Irving became the seventh player in franchise history to score 50 points or more in a single game, and joins Stephon Marbury (2001) as the only one to also record 15 combined rebounds and assists. Irving also scored 25 of the Nets' 56 points in the first half.

Irving missed 26 games due to a right shoulder injury, and returned on January 12, 2020, scoring 21 points on a 10-of-11 shooting in the 108–86 victory over the Atlanta Hawks. On January 25, he scored 45 points, also recording six rebounds and seven assists, to lead Brooklyn to a 121–111 overtime victory over the Detroit Pistons. The next day, the Nets were scheduled to play the New York Knicks at Madison Square Garden, but Irving left the arena prior to tip-off upon learning of the death of Kobe Bryant. On January 31, Irving scored a season-high 54 points on 19-of-23 shooting in a 133–118 victory over the Chicago Bulls. On February 20, it was announced that he would undergo season-ending surgery on his injured shoulder.

==== 2020–2021: 50–40–90 season ====
In the Nets' season opener on December 22, Irving had 25 points, four assists, and four rebounds in a 125–99 victory over the Golden State Warriors. Three days later, he had 37 points and eight assists in a 123–95 victory over his former team, the Boston Celtics. On February 18, 2021, Irving was named an Eastern Conference starter for the 2021 NBA All-Star Game, his seventh selection. On May 6, Irving had a season-high 45 points in a 113–109 loss to the Dallas Mavericks. At the end of the regular season, he became the ninth player in NBA history to join the 50–40–90 club, representing the shooting percentages from the field (.506), the three-point line (.402), and the free throw line (.922). Irving also became only the fourth player to average over 25.0 points, while making the 50–40–90 club, the others being Stephen Curry, Kevin Durant, and Larry Bird.

Irving sprained his right ankle after landing on Giannis Antetokounmpo's foot during Game 4 of the Conference Semifinals against the Milwaukee Bucks, and missed Game 5. The Nets lost the series in seven games.

==== 2021–2022: Playoff disappointment ====
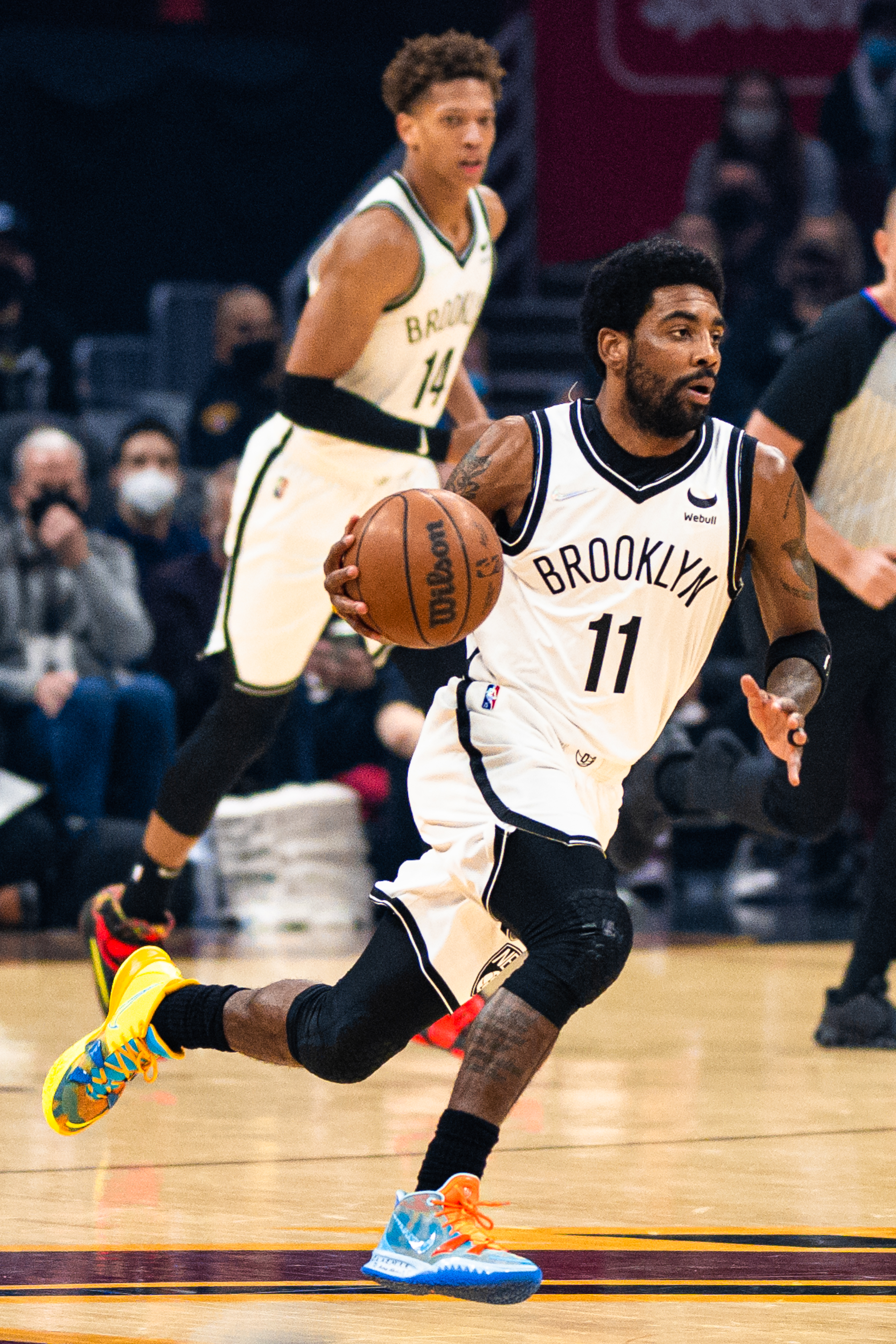
Irving in 2022

On October 12, 2021, the Nets' general manager Sean Marks announced that Irving would be ineligible to play or practice with the team, due to the New York City COVID-19 vaccine mandate, until being vaccinated. Despite remaining unvaccinated, on December 17, following a large number of players lost to injuries and health and safety protocols, as well as an inordinate minutes load on Kevin Durant and James Harden, the Nets announced that Irving would return to the team as a part-time player for games outside of the New York area and Toronto. On January 5, 2022, Irving made his season debut, recording 22 points, three rebounds, and four assists, on 9-of-17 shooting in 31 minutes in a 129–121 victory over the Indiana Pacers.

It was speculated that Irving was originally on the NBA 75th Anniversary Team which was announced on October 21, 2021, as the Brooklyn Nets prematurely posted an announcement congratulating him on the achievement, but was later excluded, allegedly due to the ongoing vaccine mandate controversy. Former teammate LeBron James later said, "Damn shame he ain’t Top 75!", as did Andre Iguodola, "So y'all saying Kyrie Irving ain't top 75? I agree… he top 20 at least…" in Twitter posts. Irving himself, sports commentators, and fans criticized the exclusion due to Irving's already illustrious career at the time of the list.

On February 26, 2022, Irving scored a then season-high 38 points with five rebounds, five assists, and two steals in a 126–123 victory over the reigning champions Milwaukee Bucks. In February 2022, New York City mayor Eric Adams announced that the city would be lifting its vaccine requirement for indoor activities on March 7. However, Irving remained subject to a different workplace vaccine mandate that remained in place. In a public statement, Adams said that making a specific exemption for Irving would "send the wrong message" to other people employed in the city.

On March 8, Irving scored a then season-high 50 points on 15-of-19 shooting from the field and delivered six assists in a 132–121 win over the Charlotte Hornets. He became only the second guard in NBA history (after Michael Jordan) who would have multiple 50-point games while shooting 75 percent from the floor. A week later, Irving scored 41 of his career-high and Nets franchise-record 60 points in the first half, grabbed six rebounds, delivered four assists along with four steals on 20-of-31 shooting from the field, including eight three-pointers, in a 150–108 victory over the Orlando Magic. On March 23, Mayor Adams announced that the city would be relaxing its COVID-19 vaccine mandate, allowing Irving to play at the Barclays Center. On March 27, Irving made his home debut against the Charlotte Hornets, scoring 16 points in 41 minutes, in a 119–110 loss.

On April 12, Irving, in his first play-in appearance, scored 34 points and dished out 12 assists in a 115–108 victory over the Cleveland Cavaliers to secure the #7 seed in the playoffs. In Game 1 of the first round of the playoffs, Irving scored a game-high 39 points along with five rebounds, six assists, and 4 steals in a narrow 115–114 loss to the Boston Celtics. He was fined $50,000 on April 19 for middle finger gestures and profane language to fans in Boston during that game. Brooklyn would go on to lose to Boston in four games, and Irving was swept for the first time in his career.

==== 2022–2023: Trade request ====
Following the end of the 2021–22 season, there was speculation that Irving would decline his player option and pursue a sign-and-trade deal with another team. Irving ultimately opted into his $37 million player option, returning to the Nets for the 2022–23 NBA season. On November 3, 2022, the Nets suspended Irving for at least five NBA games due to his failure to "unequivocally say he has no antisemitic beliefs" and said that he is "currently unfit to be associated with the Brooklyn Nets." On December 16, Irving scored 32 points and put up a game-winning three-pointer in a 119–116 victory over the Toronto Raptors. In the next game, he scored 38 points, helping the Nets overcome a 17-point halftime deficit in a 124–121 victory over the Detroit Pistons.

On January 20, 2023, Irving scored a season-high 48 points, including a season-high eight 3-pointers, along with 11 rebounds, six assists, and four steals in a 117–106 victory over the Utah Jazz. In the next game, Irving recorded 38 points, seven rebounds, and nine assists in a 120–116 victory over the reigning champions Golden State Warriors. On January 26, Irving was named an Eastern Conference starter for the 2023 NBA All-Star Game, his eighth selection and sixth as a starter. On February 4, it was reported that Irving had requested a trade; the request was made after talks about a new contract with the Nets did not go to his liking.

=== Dallas Mavericks (2023–2025) ===
==== 2023: Debut and playoff miss ====
On February 6, 2023, the Nets traded Irving, along with Markieff Morris, to the Dallas Mavericks, in exchange for Dorian Finney-Smith, Spencer Dinwiddie, an unprotected 2029 first-round pick, and second-round picks in 2027 and 2029. On February 8, Irving made his Mavericks debut, putting up 24 points, five rebounds, and four assists in a 110–104 victory over the Los Angeles Clippers. On March 2, Irving scored 40 points on 15-of-22 shooting from the field, including 6-of-8 from beyond the arc in a 133–126 victory over the Philadelphia 76ers. In the same game his teammate Luka Dončić scored 42 points and it was the first time in Dallas franchise history that two players scored 40 points in the same game. Irving was re-signed to a three-year, $126 million contract on July 7, 2023.

==== 2023–2024: Renaissance season and fourth Finals appearance ====
On January 11, 2024, Irving scored 44 points and delivered 10 assists in a 128–124 win over the New York Knicks. On March 17, Irving put up 24 points, seven rebounds, nine assists, and a game-winning left-handed floater in a 107–105 victory over the defending champion Denver Nuggets. This game-winner was a record 21-foot floater, for the longest game-winning hook shot ever recorded. On April 7, Irving scored a season-high 48 points in a 147–136 overtime victory over the Houston Rockets. Irving finished the regular season just shy of a repeat of the 50–40–90 season he recorded in 2021, with a 49.7% field goal percentage, only 0.3% short of the mark, combined with qualifying 41.1% three-point and 90.5% free throw percentages.

On May 30, in Game 5 of the Western Conference Finals against the Minnesota Timberwolves, Irving scored 36 points, along with four rebounds and five assists, to help Dallas close the series with a 124–103 victory as the Mavericks advanced to the NBA Finals for the first time since 2011, where they would face Irving's former team, the Boston Celtics. Outside of a 35-point outing in Game 3, Irving struggled mightily throughout the Finals, averaging just sixteen points per game in the other four matchups, as Dallas would lose in five games.

Sportswriters declared the season to be a "renaissance", "revival", and "redemption" of Irving's career, with the veteran player having performances and statistics in the highest caliber of the league once again.

==== 2024–26: Luka Dončić trade and ACL tear ====
On February 1, 2025, Luka Dončić was traded to the Los Angeles Lakers in exchange for Anthony Davis. On February 10, Irving was named an injury replacement for the 2025 NBA All-Star Game, his ninth All-Star selection. On March 3, Irving tore his ACL in the first quarter against the Sacramento Kings, ending his season, and also putting into question his availability for the 2025–26 season.

On July 6, 2025, Irving re-signed with the Mavericks on a three-year, $119 million contract. On February 18, 2026, Irving was ruled out for the remainder of the season as he continued to recover from the ACL injury.

==== 2026–27 ====
On October 21, 2026, Irving made his return from injury, putting up 15 points, four rebounds, two assists, and one steal in a 128–110 loss to the Houston Rockets.

== National team career ==
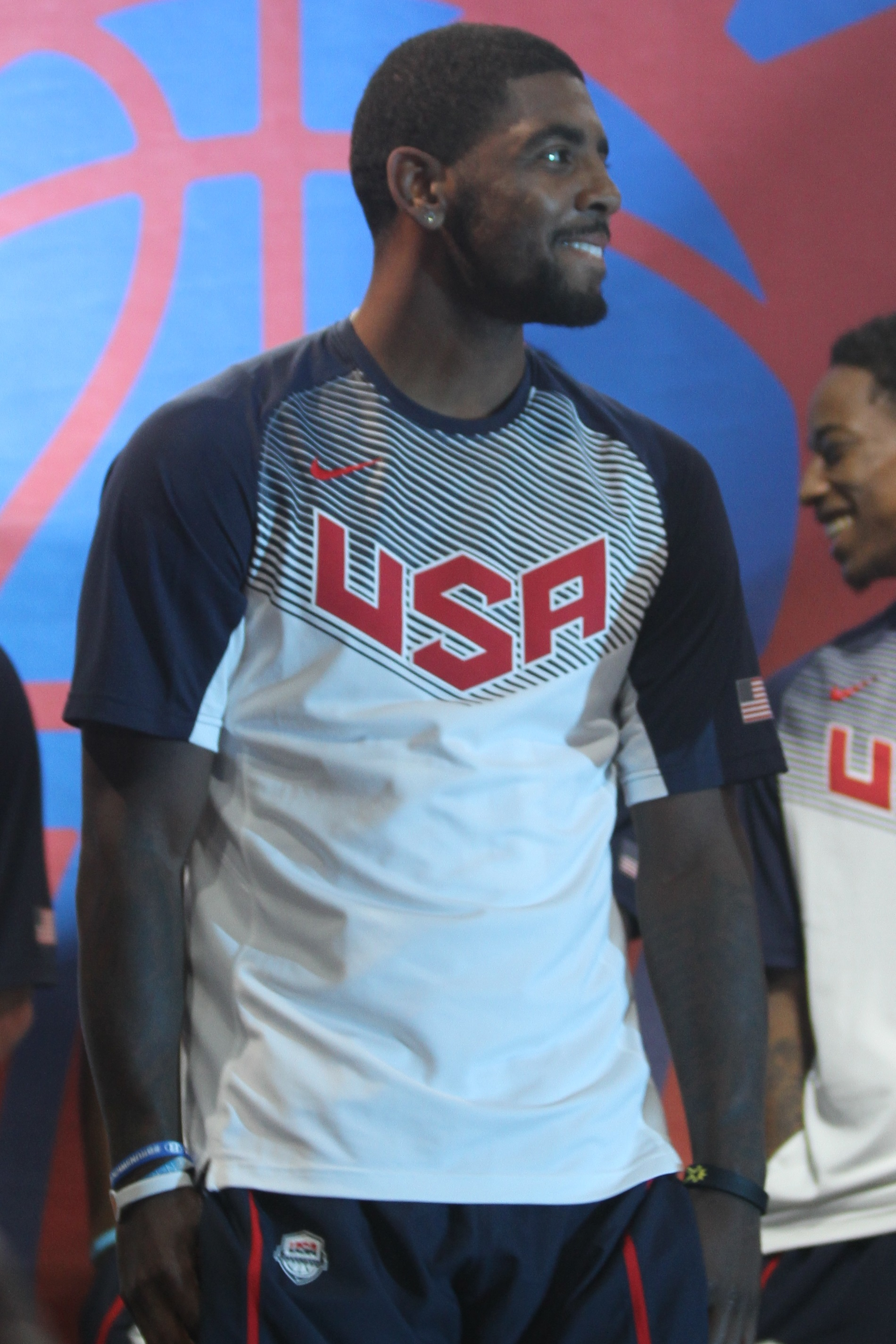
Irving with Team USA at the 2014 World Basketball Festival

In 2012, Irving was in contention for a position on the Australian team for the 2012 Olympics. However, he elected not to represent his nation of birth, instead focusing on selection for the United States national team for the 2016 Olympic Games.

Irving was a member of the United States national team that competed in the 2014 FIBA Basketball World Cup. He helped lead Team USA to the gold medal and was subsequently named the tournament's MVP. Irving started all nine games in the tournament, averaging 12.1 points and 3.6 assists per game, including 26 points scored in the gold-medal game. He was then named the 2014 USA Basketball Male Athlete of the Year.

In 2016, Irving helped Team USA win the gold medal at the 2016 Summer Olympics. With the win, he became just the fourth member of Team USA to capture the NBA championship and an Olympic gold medal in the same year, joining LeBron James, Michael Jordan, and Scottie Pippen. In February 2025, Irving announced his intentions to play for Australia and join the Australian Boomers for the 2028 Olympic Games.

== Career statistics ==
Legend
GP	Games played	GS	Games started	MPG	Minutes per game
FG%	Field goal percentage	3P%	3-point field goal percentage	FT%	Free throw percentage
RPG	Rebounds per game	APG	Assists per game	SPG	Steals per game
BPG	Blocks per game	PPG	Points per game	**Bold**	Career high
†	Won an NBA championship	*	Led the league

=== NBA ===
==== Regular season ====
Year	Team	GP	GS	MPG	FG%	3P%	FT%	RPG	APG	SPG	BPG	PPG
2011–12	Cleveland	51	51	30.5	.469	.399	.872	3.7	5.4	1.1	.4	18.5
2012–13	Cleveland	59	59	34.7	.452	.391	.855	3.7	5.9	**1.5**	.4	22.5
2013–14	Cleveland	71	71	35.2	.430	.358	.861	3.6	6.1	**1.5**	.3	20.8
2014–15	Cleveland	**75**	**75**	36.4	.468	.415	.863	3.2	5.2	**1.5**	.3	21.7
2015–16†	Cleveland	53	53	31.5	.448	.321	.885	3.0	4.7	1.1	.3	19.6
2016–17	Cleveland	72	72	35.1	.473	.401	.905	3.2	5.8	1.2	.3	25.2
2017–18	Boston	60	60	32.2	.491	.408	.889	3.8	5.1	1.1	.3	24.4
2018–19	Boston	67	67	33.0	.487	.401	.873	5.0	**6.9**	**1.5**	.5	23.8
2019–20	Brooklyn	20	20	32.9	.478	.394	.922	**5.2**	6.4	1.4	.5	27.4
2020–21	Brooklyn	54	54	34.9	.506	.402	.922	4.8	6.0	1.4	.7	26.9
2021–22	Brooklyn	29	29	37.6	.469	**.418**	.915	4.4	5.8	1.4	.6	**27.4**
2022–23	Brooklyn	40	40	36.9	.486	.374	.883	5.1	5.3	1.0	**.8**	27.1
2022–23	Dallas	20	20	**38.1**	**.510**	.392	**.947**	5.0	6.0	1.3	.6	27.0
2023–24	Dallas	58	58	35.0	.497	.411	.905	5.0	5.2	1.3	.5	25.6
2024–25	Dallas	50	50	36.1	.473	.401	.916	4.8	4.6	1.3	.5	24.7
Career		779	779	34.5	.474	.394	.888	4.1	5.6	1.3	.4	23.7
All-Star		9	6	25.3	.598	.460	.750	6.0	9.2	1.2	.1	19.1

==== Playoffs ====
Year	Team	GP	GS	MPG	FG%	3P%	FT%	RPG	APG	SPG	BPG	PPG
2015	Cleveland	13	13	35.7	.438	**.450**	.841	3.6	3.8	1.3	.8	19.0
2016†	Cleveland	21	21	36.8	**.475**	.440	.875	3.0	4.7	1.7	.6	25.2
2017	Cleveland	18	18	36.3	.468	.373	.905	2.8	5.3	1.3	.4	**25.9**
2019	Boston	9	9	36.7	.385	.310	.900	4.4	**7.0**	1.3	.4	21.3
2021	Brooklyn	9	9	36.1	.472	.369	.929	**5.8**	3.4	1.0	.6	22.7
2022	Brooklyn	4	4	**42.6**	.444	.381	**1.000**	5.3	5.3	**1.8**	**1.3**	21.3
2024	Dallas	**22***	**22***	40.0	.467	.390	.849	3.7	5.1	1.0	.3	22.1
Career		96	96	37.5	.458	.392	.883	3.7	4.9	1.3	.6	23.0

=== College ===
Year	Team	GP	GS	MPG	FG%	3P%	FT%	RPG	APG	SPG	BPG	PPG
2010–11	Duke	11	8	27.5	.529	.462	.901	3.4	4.3	1.5	.5	17.5

== Awards and honors ==
NBA

- NBA champion: 2016
- 9-time NBA All-Star: 2013–2015, 2017–2019, 2021, 2023, 2025
- NBA All-Star Game MVP: 2014
- All-NBA Second Team: 2019
- All-NBA Third Team: 2015, 2021
- NBA Rookie of the Year: 2012
- NBA All-Rookie First Team: 2012
- NBA Three-Point Contest champion: 2013
- Rising Stars Challenge MVP: 2012
- 50–40–90 club (2021)

USA Basketball

- Summer Olympics gold medal winner: 2016
- FIBA Basketball World Cup gold medal winner: 2014
- FIBA Basketball World Cup MVP: 2014
- FIBA Basketball World Cup All-Tournament Team: 2014
- USA Basketball Male Athlete of the Year: 2014

High school

- McDonald's All-American: 2010
- Nike Hoop Summit All-American: 2010
- Jordan Brand High School All-American: 2010
- First-team Parade All-American: 2010

Media

- Best Team ESPY Award (with the Cavaliers): 2016

== Acting roles ==
In 2012, Irving played the role of Uncle Drew in a series of Pepsi Max advertisements. He wrote and directed episode 2, in which Irving starred alongside Bill Russell and Kevin Love, and episode 3, in which he starred alongside Nate Robinson and Maya Moore. Irving also wrote and directed episode 4 of "Uncle Drew", which was released in November 2015, and in which he starred in alongside Baron Davis, J. B. Smoove, and Ray Allen. In 2017, the Uncle Drew advertisement series became a skit inside an old school diner featuring Pepsi in its current design, stored in a fridge with its original logo. Irving has also starred as the character in a feature film, Uncle Drew, which also features former NBA stars, and was released in June 2018.

Irving appeared on an episode of the Disney XD series Kickin' It in 2012, and guest starred on Family Guy, lending his voice for the season 17 (2018) episode "Big Trouble in Little Quahog".

== Business ventures ==
Irving's shoe deal with Nike was worth US$11 million, as of 2019. His signature sneakers were the second best-selling line of 2017, behind LeBron James. The NPD Group no longer tracks signature sneakers but projected that the trend continued into 2018. Irving's themed sneaker collaborations include that of the television shows Friends and SpongeBob SquarePants. The latter collection sold out immediately.

In September 2023, Irving announced a new partnership with Chinese sports brand Anta Sports. A namesake sneaker was announced for the 2023–2024 NBA season alongside a business collaboration that saw Irving join the company as Chief Creative Officer of Anta Basketball. They will also launch a series of Anta x Kyrie Youth Basketball Camps around the world.

In December 2023, Irving made an investment in sneaker platform Kicks Crew and joined the company as Chief Community Officer. His role is expected to focus on cause-driven projects aimed at bringing communities together in collaborations that blend art and basketball and to extend globally.

== Personal life ==
Irving has stated that he is a Muslim. He also tweeted about being omnist. Irving has publicly fasted for Ramadan and has been seen praying at Valley Ranch Islamic Center in Irving, Texas.

Irving enjoys reading and keeps a journal. He also likes to sing, dance, and play the baritone sax. Irving's godfather is former NBA player Rod Strickland. Irving and his ex-girlfriend have a daughter.

Former Orlando Magic player Isaiah Briscoe is a third cousin of Irving.

In May 2011, Irving made a promise to his father to finish his bachelor's degree at Duke within five years. However, in 2016, having not achieved his degree, Irving claimed he was putting his plans on hold, stating, "when I leave the game of basketball, then I'll focus on the next step of my life." In 2015, Irving launched his PSD Underwear collection.

Irving has been with Marlene Wilkerson since 2018 and they have two sons together.

In August 2018, Irving and his older sister were honored with a "welcome home" ceremony at Standing Rock Indian Reservation, acknowledging their family ties to the community, and in gratitude for Irving's activism on behalf of the water protectors at the Dakota Access Pipeline protests. His mother was known to the tribe, though she was "adopted out" at a young age, and their late grandmother and great-grandparents also had ties to the reservation community. Since then, Irving has continued to honor his Lakota heritage through donations to the tribe, designing Nike shoes dedicated to the Lakota people, as well as burning sage before every game. In 2021, Irving's petition for citizenship was granted and he became an enrolled member of the Standing Rock Sioux Tribe.

Starting with the 2016–2017 season, Irving moved to a predominantly plant-based diet, which he also referenced in a December 2017 Nike ad. Since then, Irving has moved to a 100% plant-based diet.

=== Activism ===
In November 2016, Irving tweeted his support for the water protectors at the Standing Rock Indian Reservation who were demonstrating against the Dakota Access Pipeline in North Dakota.

Irving has donated to various social causes through his K.A.I. Family Foundation. In 2020, he donated a home to the family of George Floyd. Irving paid off student debt for students from Lincoln University. He committed $1.5 million to help pay WNBA players who opted out of playing during the COVID-19 pandemic. Irving donated over $300,000 to food banks and with City Harvest on his birthday. He donated 17 pallets of food to the Standing Rock Sioux Tribe.

On July 29, 2021, Irving built a solar water center in Pakistan with Paani Project through his K.A.I. Family Foundation.

== Conspiracy theories ==
In February 2017, Irving stated in an interview for a podcast that he believes that the Earth is flat. In a later interview, Irving was less forceful in advancing his flat Earth belief, encouraging people to "do their own research" into the topic. In September 2017, Irving denied these claims and said that media misunderstood him as he was joking. However, in a June 2018 interview, when asked if he would admit that the world is round, he said, "I don't know. I really don't", and added that people should "do [their] own research for what [they] want to believe in" because "Our educational system is flawed". In October 2018, Irving apologized for his original flat Earth comments but stopped short of saying whether he still believed that the Earth is flat.

Irving also stated that he believes in other conspiracy theories, such as the idea that John F. Kennedy was killed because he wanted to end the "banking cartel."

Amid the COVID-19 pandemic and his hesitancy to receive a vaccine against the virus, Irving shared and interacted with social media posts from a conspiracy theorist on Instagram, claiming that "secret societies are administering vaccines in a plot to connect Black people to a master computer for a plan of Satan." Amidst these controversies, it was speculated that Irving was excluded from the NBA 75th Anniversary Team list in October 2021.

On September 15, 2022, Irving shared a video on his Instagram story featuring a rant by InfoWars creator and far-right conspiracy theorist Alex Jones. In the 2002 video, Jones promotes the New World Order conspiracy theory and alleges that state actors are planning to oppress the public by intentionally releasing viruses. In a Substack post published on October 3, former NBA player Kareem Abdul-Jabbar decried Irving's post, calling Jones "one of the most despicable human beings alive...to associate with him means you share his stench."

=== Antisemitic conspiracy theories ===
Irving made his first tweet espousing Black Hebrew Israelite doctrine in March 2021. Black Hebrews espouse the ideology that black people are the real Jews, wherein antisemitism is common. On October 27, 2022, Irving tweeted a link to an Amazon listing page for Hebrews to Negroes: Wake Up Black America, a 2018 film based on a book of the same name, which promotes Black Hebrew Israelite ideology. The film includes denials that the Holocaust occurred, quotes attributed to Adolf Hitler and Henry Ford, claims that Jewish people worship Satan, and accusations that Jews controlled the Atlantic slave trade and currently control the media. In a tweet on October 28, Nets owner Joseph Tsai said he was "disappointed that Kyrie appears to support a film based on a book full of anti-semitic disinformation", and expressed his intent to address the issue further with Irving.

On October 29, 2022, Irving tweeted that deeming him antisemitic was "not justified", and that he intended to "learn from all walks of life and religions." The same day, during a postgame press availability at Barclays Center, Irving denied having any religious biases and defended the tweet, telling reporters that "[h]istory is not supposed to be hidden from anybody" and stating, "I'm not going to stand down on anything I believe in. I'm only going to get stronger because I'm not alone. I have a whole army around me." Irving deleted the tweet on or around October 30.

On October 31, during a game between the Nets and the Indiana Pacers at Barclays Center, several attendees sitting courtside wore shirts bearing the phrase "Fight Antisemitism", an apparent reference to Irving's tweet. Two days later, Irving and the Nets jointly announced they would each donate US$500,000 to organizations combating religious hatred, and would work with the Anti-Defamation League (ADL) to create programming related to opposing antisemitism. Though he did not apologize for promoting the film, Irving was quoted as saying that he opposes "all forms of hatred and oppression and stand[s] strong with communities that are marginalized and impacted every day"; Irving added that he "[took] responsibility" for the impact of his tweet on the Jewish community. In a subsequent statement of his own, NBA Commissioner Adam Silver, who is Jewish, criticized Irving for "not offer[ing] an unqualified apology" or expressly denouncing the film's content, and said he would meet with Irving "in the next week to discuss this situation."

During a press availability on November 3, Irving admitted that some of the film's content was "unfortunate" and untrue, but did not apologize for promoting the film, saying he was "not the one who made the documentary." Irving suggested that focus on his promotion of the film was unfairly diverting attention away from African-American history, declaring at one point that "300 million of [his] ancestors are buried in America"; Irving added that he would be able to debunk any criticism leveled at him because of his propensity for "study[ing]", and that he "know[s] the Oxford dictionary." Asked directly if Irving held antisemitic beliefs, he did not give a yes-or-no response, saying only, "I cannot be antisemitic if I know where I come from." That night, the Nets announced that they had suspended Irving without pay for at least five games, due to his "failure to disavow antisemitism when given a clear opportunity to do so" and "conduct detrimental to the team."

ADL CEO Jonathan Greenblatt tweeted that Irving's suspension was "well-deserved", and said the ADL would reject Irving's previously announced donation. Four hours after the Nets' initial announcement of his suspension, Irving finally issued an apology via Instagram, writing in part, "To All Jewish families and Communities that are hurt and affected from my post, I am deeply sorry to have caused you pain, and I apologize...I had no intentions to disrespect any Jewish cultural history regarding the Holocaust or perpetuate any hate. I am learning from this unfortunate event and hope we can find understanding between us all." Following Irving's apology, Nets general manager Sean Marks said that Irving would have to meet with Jewish leaders and with the team before he could return to play.

== Filmography ==
=== Films ===
Year	Title	Role
2018	Uncle Drew	Uncle Drew

=== Television ===
Year	Title	Role	Notes
2012	Kickin' It	Himself	Episode: "Sole Brothers"
2016	We Bare Bears	Himself	Episode: "Charlie Ball"
2018	Family Guy	Vernon the Waterbear	Episode: "Big Trouble in Little Quahog"

== See also ==
- List of NBA career 3-point scoring leaders
- List of NBA career free throw percentage leaders
- List of NBA career playoff 3-point scoring leaders
- List of NBA single-game scoring leaders
- List of NBA single-game 3-point field goal leaders
- List of NBA players born outside the United States
- List of people banned or suspended by the NBA
