= Billy Ray Cyrus discography =

Cataloging of published recordings by Billy Ray Cyrus

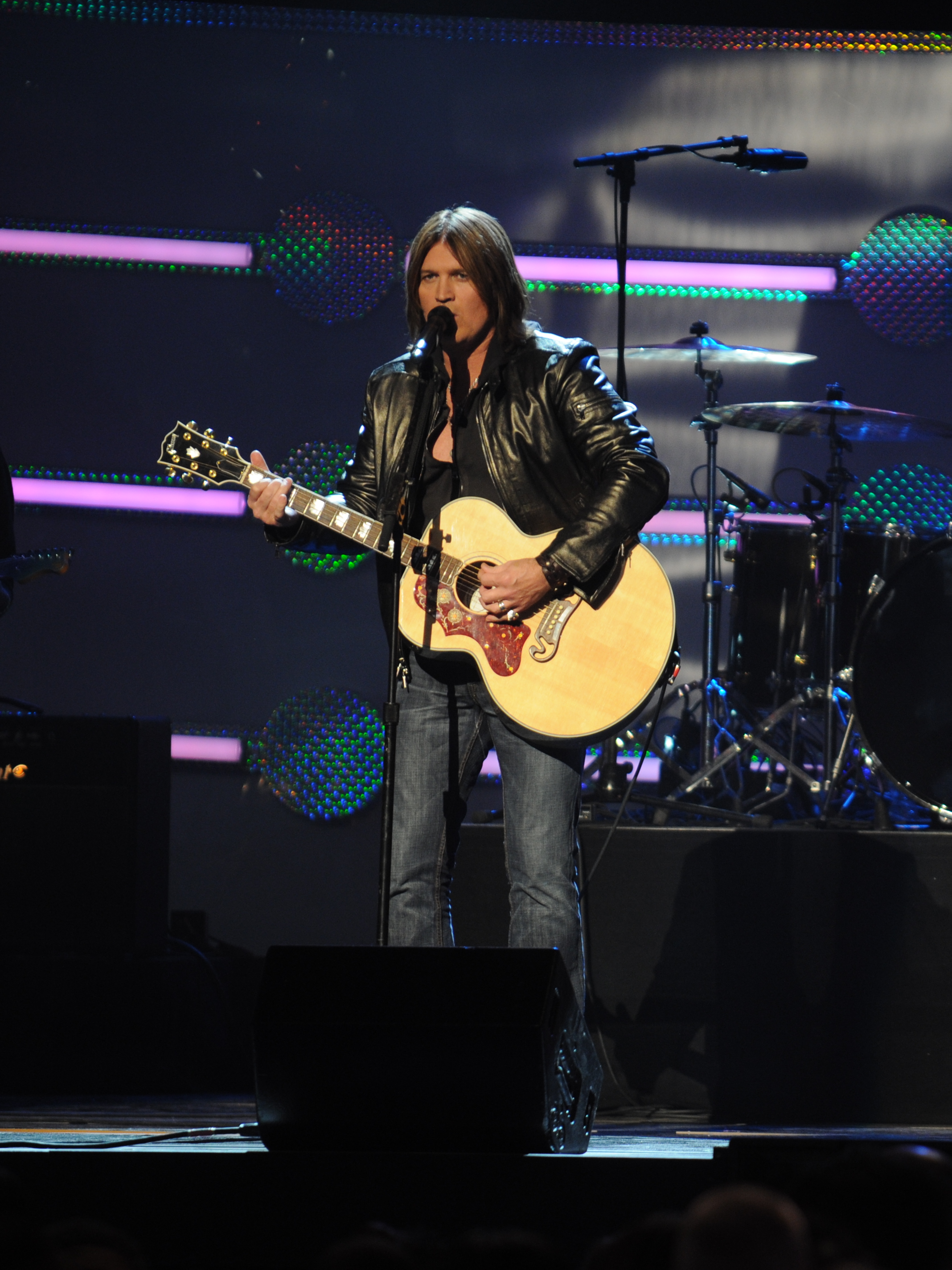
- Billy Ray Cyrus performing the Kids Inaugural Concert, January 19, 2009.
- Studio albums: 16
- Extended plays: 1
- Compilation albums: 10
- Singles: 54
- Music videos: 46

Billy Ray Cyrus is an American country music singer, songwriter, actor and philanthropist. He has released 16 studio albums and 53 singles since 1992, and is best known for his debut single "Achy Breaky Heart". 32 of his singles have charted on the Billboard Hot Country Songs chart between 1992 and 2011.

Cyrus' most successful album to date is his debut album Some Gave All, which has been certified 9× multi-platinum in the United States. The album has also sold more than 20 million copies worldwide and is the best-selling debut album of all time for a solo male artist and remains one of the biggest selling albums of all time.

== Studio albums ==
=== 1990s ===
Title	Album details	Peak positions										Certifications
Title	Album details	US	US Country	AUS	CAN	CAN Country	NL	NOR	NZ	SWE	SWI	Certifications
Some Gave All	Release date: May 19, 1992; Label: Mercury; Formats: CD, cassette, LP	1	1	1	1	1	58	5	2	42	34	RIAA: 9× Platinum; ARIA: 3× Platinum; BPI: Gold; MC: Diamond; RMNZ: Platinum
It Won't Be the Last	Release date: June 22, 1993; Label: Mercury Records; Formats: CD, cassette	3	1	20	11	1	86	18	43	33	27	RIAA: Platinum; MC: 2× Platinum
Storm in the Heartland	Release date: November 8, 1994; Label: Mercury Records; Formats: CD, cassette	73	11	—	—	6	—	—	—	—	40	RIAA: Gold; MC: Gold
Trail of Tears	Release date: August 20, 1996; Label: Mercury Records; Formats: CD, cassette	125	20	—	—	14	—	—	—	—	50	
Shot Full of Love	Release date: November 3, 1998; Label: Mercury Nashville; Formats: CD, cassette	—	32	—	—	9	—	—	—	—	—	
"—" denotes releases that did not chart

=== 2000s ===
Title	Album details	Peak positions			
Title	Album details	US	US Country	US Christ.	CAN Country
Southern Rain	Release date: October 17, 2000; Label: Monument Records; Formats: CD, cassette	102	13	—	24
Time Flies	Release date: June 10, 2003; Label: Madacy Entertainment; Formats: CD	—	56	—	—
The Other Side	Release date: October 28, 2003; Label: Word/Curb/Warner Bros.; Formats: CD	131	18	5	—
Wanna Be Your Joe	Release date: July 17, 2006; Label: New Door Records; Formats: CD, download	113	24	—	—
Home at Last	Release date: July 24, 2007; Label: Walt Disney Records; Formats: CD, download	20	3	—	—
Back to Tennessee	Release date: April 7, 2009; Label: Lyric Street Records; Formats: CD, download	41	13	—	—
"—" denotes releases that did not chart

=== 2010s ===
Title	Album details	Peak positions			
Title	Album details	US Country	US	US Indie	AUS
I'm American	Release date: June 28, 2011; Label: Buena Vista Records; Formats: CD, download	153	24	—	—
Change My Mind	Release date: October 23, 2012; Label: Blue Cadillac Music; Formats: CD, download	—	38	—	75
Thin Line	Release date: September 9, 2016; Label: Blue Cadillac Music; Formats: CD, download	—	49	—	20
Set the Record Straight	Release date: November 10, 2017; Label: Flatwoods Productions; Formats: CD, download	—	— (Note: Set the Record Straight did not enter the Billboard Top Country Albums, but peaked at number 35 on the Country Album Sales chart.)	43	—
The SnakeDoctor Circus	Release date: May 24, 2019; Label: Broken Bow Records; Formats: LP, CD, download	—	— (Note: The SnakeDoctor Circus did not enter the Billboard Top Country Albums, but peaked at number 35 on the Country Album Sales chart.)	—	—
"—" denotes releases that did not chart

== Compilation albums ==
Title	Album details	Peak positions	
Title	Album details	US Country	CAN Country
The Best of Billy Ray Cyrus: Cover to Cover	Release date: June 24, 1997; Label: Mercury Nashville; Formats: CD, cassette	23	8
20th Century Masters – The Millennium Collection	Release date: March 23, 2003; Label: Mercury Nashville; Formats: CD	59	—
The Definitive Collection	Release date: June 30, 2004; Label: Mercury Nashville; Formats: CD, download	—	—
The Collection	Release date: August 2, 2005; Label: Madacy Entertainment; Formats: CD	—	—
Love Songs	Release date: January 29, 2008; Label: Mercury Nashville; Formats: CD, download	63	—
The Best of Billy Ray Cyrus	Release date: 2009; Label: Universal Music Canada; Formats: CD, music download	—	—
Icon	Release date: March 1, 2011; Label: Mercury Nashville; Formats: CD, music download	—	—
The Definitive Collection	Release date: April 7, 2014; Label: Hump Head Records; Formats: CD, download	—	—
Icon: The Distance	Release date: June 3, 2014; Label: Mercury Nashville; Formats: CD, download	—	—
"—" denotes releases that did not chart

== Extended plays ==
Title	Album details
iTunes Live from London	Release date: May 12, 2009; Label: iTunes UK; Formats: Music download

== Singles ==
=== 1990s ===
Year	Title	Peak positions									Certifications	Album
Year	Title	US	US Country	AUS	BEL (FL)	CAN	CAN Country	NL	NZ	UK	Certifications	Album
1992	"Achy Breaky Heart"	4	1	1	6	4	1	25	1	3	RIAA: Platinum; ARIA: 3× Platinum; BPI: Silver; RMNZ: Platinum	Some Gave All
1992	"Could've Been Me"	72	2	43	40	72	1	29	7	24		Some Gave All
1992	"Wher'm I Gonna Live?"	—	23	—	—	16	—	—	—	—		Some Gave All
1992	"These Boots Are Made for Walkin'"	—	—	115	32	—	—	27	42	63		Some Gave All
1993	"She's Not Cryin' Anymore"	70	6	—	—	3	—	—	—	—		Some Gave All
1993	"Some Gave All"	—	52 (Note: "Some Gave All" originally charted at number 72 on Hot Country Songs in 1992 before officially being released in 1993.)	—	—	86	—	—	—	—		Some Gave All
1993	"In the Heart of a Woman"	76	3	77	—	—	1	—	—	—		It Won't Be the Last
1993	"Somebody New"	— (Note: "Somebody New" did not enter the Billboard Hot 100, but peaked at number four on the Bubbling Under Hot 100 Singles chart.)	9	—	—	14	—	—	—	—		It Won't Be the Last
1994	"Words by Heart"	— (Note: "Words by Heart" did not enter the Billboard Hot 100, but peaked at number 19 on the Bubbling Under Hot 100 Singles chart.)	12	—	—	14	—	—	—	—		It Won't Be the Last
1994	"Talk Some"	—	63	—	—	—	—	—	—	—		It Won't Be the Last
1994	"Storm in the Heartland"	— (Note: "Storm in the Heartland" did not enter the Billboard Hot 100, but peaked at number eight on the Bubbling Under Hot 100 Singles chart.)	33	—	—	17	—	—	—	—		Storm in the Heartland
1995	"Deja Blue"	—	66	—	—	60	—	—	—	—		Storm in the Heartland
1995	"One Last Thrill"	—	—	—	—	—	—	—	—	—		Storm in the Heartland
1995	"The Fastest Horse in a One Horse Town"	—	75	—	—	73	—	—	—	—		NASCAR: Runnin' Wide Open
1996	"Trail of Tears"	—	69	—	—	59	—	—	—	—		Trail of Tears
1997	"Three Little Words"	—	65	—	—	61	—	—	—	—		Trail of Tears
1997	"It's All the Same to Me"	—	19	—	—	14	—	—	—	—		The Best of Billy Ray Cyrus: Cover to Cover
1998	"Time for Letting Go"	—	70	—	—	—	—	—	—	—		Shot Full of Love
1998	"Busy Man"	46	3	—	—	5	—	—	—	—		Shot Full of Love
1999	"Give My Heart to You"	—	41	—	—	63	—	—	—	—		Shot Full of Love
"—" denotes releases that did not chart

=== 2000s ===
Year	Title	Peak positions				Album
Year	Title	US	US Country	CAN	CAN Country (Note: Peak positions from RPM Country Tracks in 2000 and Canada Country in 2007.)	Album
2000	"You Won't Be Lonely Now"	80	17	—	33	Southern Rain
2000	"We the People"	—	60	—	—	Southern Rain
2001	"Burn Down the Trailer Park"	—	43	—	—	Southern Rain
2001	"Crazy 'Bout You Baby"	—	58	—	—	Southern Rain
2001	"Southern Rain"	—	45	—	—	Southern Rain
2003	"Back to Memphis"	—	60	—	—	Time Flies
2003	"Always Sixteen"	—	—	—	—	The Other Side
2004	"Face of God"	—	54	—	—	The Other Side
2004	"I Need You Now"	—	—	—	—	The Other Side
2006	"Wanna Be Your Joe"	—	—	—	—	Wanna Be Your Joe
2006	"I Want My Mullet Back"	—	—	—	—	Wanna Be Your Joe
2007	"Ready, Set, Don't Go" (with Miley Cyrus)	37	4	47	7	Home at Last
2008	"Somebody Said a Prayer"	—	33	—	—	Back to Tennessee
2009	"Back to Tennessee"	—	47	—	—	Back to Tennessee
2009	"A Good Day"	—	59	—	—	Back to Tennessee
"—" denotes releases that did not chart

=== 2010s ===
Year	Title	Peak positions	Album
Year	Title	US Country	Album
2011	"Runway Lights"	—	I'm American
2011	"Nineteen"	58	I'm American
2012	"Change My Mind"	—	Change My Mind
2013	"Hillbilly Heart (Keeping It Country)"	—	Change My Mind
2013	"Hope Is Just Ahead"	—	Change My Mind
2014	"Country Music Has the Blues" (with George Jones and Loretta Lynn)	—	Icon: The Distance
2014	"The Distance"	—	Icon: The Distance
2016	"Hey Elvis" (featuring Bryan Adams and Glenn Hughes)	—	Thin Line
2016	"Thin Line"	—	Thin Line
2017	"Achy Breaky Heart 25" (featuring Brett Kissel and Ronnie Milsap)	—	Set the Record Straight
2019	"Chevys and Fords" (with Johnny McGuire)	—	Non-album single
"—" denotes releases that did not chart

=== 2020s ===
Year	Title	Peak chart positions		Album
Year	Title	US AC	US Adult	Album
2021	"Roll That Rock" (with Bobby and Teddi Cyrus)	—	—	Non-album singles
2021	"New Day" (with Firerose)	19	37	Non-album singles
2023	"Plans" (with Firerose)	16	—	Non-album singles
"—" denotes releases that did not chart

=== As a featured artist ===
Year	Title	Peak chart positions										Certifications	Album
Year	Title	US	US Country	US R&B/H-H	BEL (FL)	BEL (WA)	CAN	CAN Country	NL	NZ	UK	Certifications	Album
1992	"Achy Breaky Heart" (Alvin and the Chipmunks featuring Billy Ray Cyrus)	—	71	—	—	—	—	—	—	—	53		Chipmunks in Low Places
1993	"Romeo" (Dolly Parton & Friends)	50	27	—	—	—	—	33	—	—	—		Slow Dancing with the Moon
2003	"When I Leave This House" (Adam Gregory featuring Billy Ray Cyrus)	—	—	—	—	—	—	—	—	—	—		Workin' on It
2014	"Achy Breaky 2" (Buck 22 featuring Billy Ray Cyrus)	80	—	— (Note: "Achy Breaky 2" did not enter the Billboard Hot R&B/Hip-Hop Songs, but peaked at number 11 on the Hot Rap Songs chart.)	—	—	—	—	—	—	—		Non-album single
2019	"Old Town Road (Remix)" (Lil Nas X featuring Billy Ray Cyrus)	1	19 (Note: "Old Town Road" (Remix) peaked at number 19 on Billboard Hot Country Songs, before Billboard magazine disqualified it from the chart on the grounds that it did not fit the country genre. It also peaked at number 50 on the Country Airplay chart.)	1	1	1	1	—	1	1	—	RIAA: 17× Platinum; RMNZ: 4× Platinum	7
"—" denotes releases that did not chart

== Other charted songs ==
Year	Title	Peak positions				Certifications	Album
Year	Title	US	AUS	CAN	UK	Certifications	Album
2009	"Butterfly Fly Away" (with Miley Cyrus)	56	56	50	78	RIAA: Platinum; BPI: Silver; RMNZ: Gold	Hannah Montana: The Movie (soundtrack)

== Videography ==
=== Video albums ===
Title	Album details	Certifications
Billy Ray Cyrus	Release date: 1993; Label: PolyGram Video; Formats: VHS	RIAA: 4× Platinum; MC: 4× Platinum
Live on Tour	Release date: 1993; Label: PolyGram Video; Formats: VHS	RIAA: 2× Platinum; MC: Platinum
The Video Collection	Release date: September 27, 1994; Label: PolyGram Video; Formats: VHS	RIAA: Platinum
One on One	Release date: November 8, 1994; Label: PolyGram Video; Formats: VHS	
Complete Video Collection	Release date: July 1, 1997; Label: PolyGram Video; Formats: VHS	
20th Century Masters – The DVD Collection	Release date: February 24, 2004; Label: Mercury Nashville; Formats: DVD	

=== Music videos ===
Year	Video	Director
1992	"Achy Breaky Heart"	Marc Ball
1992	"Could've Been Me"	Marc Ball/Kitty Moon
1992	"Wher'm I Gonna Live?"	Marc Ball
1993	"She's Not Cryin' Anymore"	Marc Ball
1993	"Some Gave All"	Charley Randazzo
1993	"In the Heart of a Woman"	Charley Randazzo
1993	"When I'm Gone"	Marc Ball
1994	"Words by Heart"	Charley Randazzo
1994	"Ain't Your Dog No More"	Charley Randazzo
1994	"Talk Some"	Charley Randazzo
1994	"Storm in the Heartland"	Charley Randazzo
1995	"Deja Blue"	Charley Randazzo
1995	"Fastest Horse in a One Horse Town"	Charley Randazzo
1995	"One Last Thrill"	Charley Randazzo
1996	"Trail of Tears"	Richard Murray
1996	"Harper Valley PTA"	Steven Monroe
1997	"Three Little Words"	Michael McNamara
1998	"Under the Hood"	Peter Zavadil
1998	"Time for Letting Go"	Charley Randazzo
1999	"Give My Heart to You"	John Lloyd Miller
2000	"You Won't Be Lonely Now"	Jim Shea
2000	"We the People"	Deb Haus
2001	"Burn Down the Trailer Park"	Peter Zavadil
2002	"What Else Is There"	Marc Lostracco
2002	"Back to Memphis"	
2003	"When I Leave This House" (with Adam Gregory)	
2003	"Always Sixteen"	Marc Ball
2004	"Face of God"	Marc Ball
2006	"Wanna Be Your Joe"	Greg Chwerchak
2006	"I Want My Mullet Back"	Mick Akins/Matt Smith
2007	"Stand" (with Miley Cyrus)	Matt Smith
2007	"Ready, Set, Don't Go"	Elliot Lester
2008	"Real Gone"	Trey Fanjoy
2008	"Somebody Said a Prayer"	Roman White
2009	"Back to Tennessee"	Declan Whitebloom
2009	"Thrillbilly"	
2009	"We'll Get By Somehow (We Always Do)"	
2011	"Runway Lights"	
2011	"I'm American"	
2012	"Change My Mind"	Michael Maxxis
2013	"Milkman's Eyes" (with Bobby Cyrus)	John Lloyd Miller
2014	"Achy Breaky 2" (with Buck 22)	Ben Griffin/Damon Elliott
2014	"Hope Is Just Ahead"	Jenn Page
2014	"Like a Country Song"	Johnny Remo
2016	"Hey Elvis" (with Bryan Adams and Glenn Hughes)	Troy Clark
2016	"Thin Line"	Blake Judd

==== Guest appearances ====
Year	Video	Director
1993	"Romeo" (with Dolly Parton & Friends)	Randee St. Nicholas

== Album appearances ==
Year	Song	Album
1992	"Achy Breaky Heart" (with Alvin and the Chipmunks)	Chipmunks in Low Places
1993	"Romeo" (Dolly Parton & Friends)	Slow Dancing with the Moon
1994	"Pictures Don't Lie"	Red Hot + Country
1995	"Fastest Horse in a One-Horse Town"	NASCAR: Runnin' Wide Open
1997	"Bluegrass State of Mind"	The Real Deal: Country, Alternative and In-Between
1999	"Scooby-Doo, Where Are You?"	Scooby-Doo and the Witch's Ghost
2001	"Let's Go to the PBR"	Dancin' with Thunder
2003	"When I Leave This House" (with Adam Gregory)	Workin' on It
2006	"I Learned from You" (with Miley Cyrus)	Hannah Montana
2006	"I Wonder"	Charlotte's Web
2007	"Just As I Am"	Kneel at the Cross
2007	"Run Rudolph Run"	Disney Channel Holiday
2008	"Real Gone"	Country Sings Disney
2009	"Butterfly Fly Away" (with Miley Cyrus)	Hannah Montana: The Movie
2010	"Love That Let's Go" (with Hannah Montana)	Hannah Montana Forever
2019	"Old Town Road" (with Lil Nas X)	7
