= List of awards and nominations received by Billy Ray Cyrus =

Billy Ray Cyrus awards and nominations
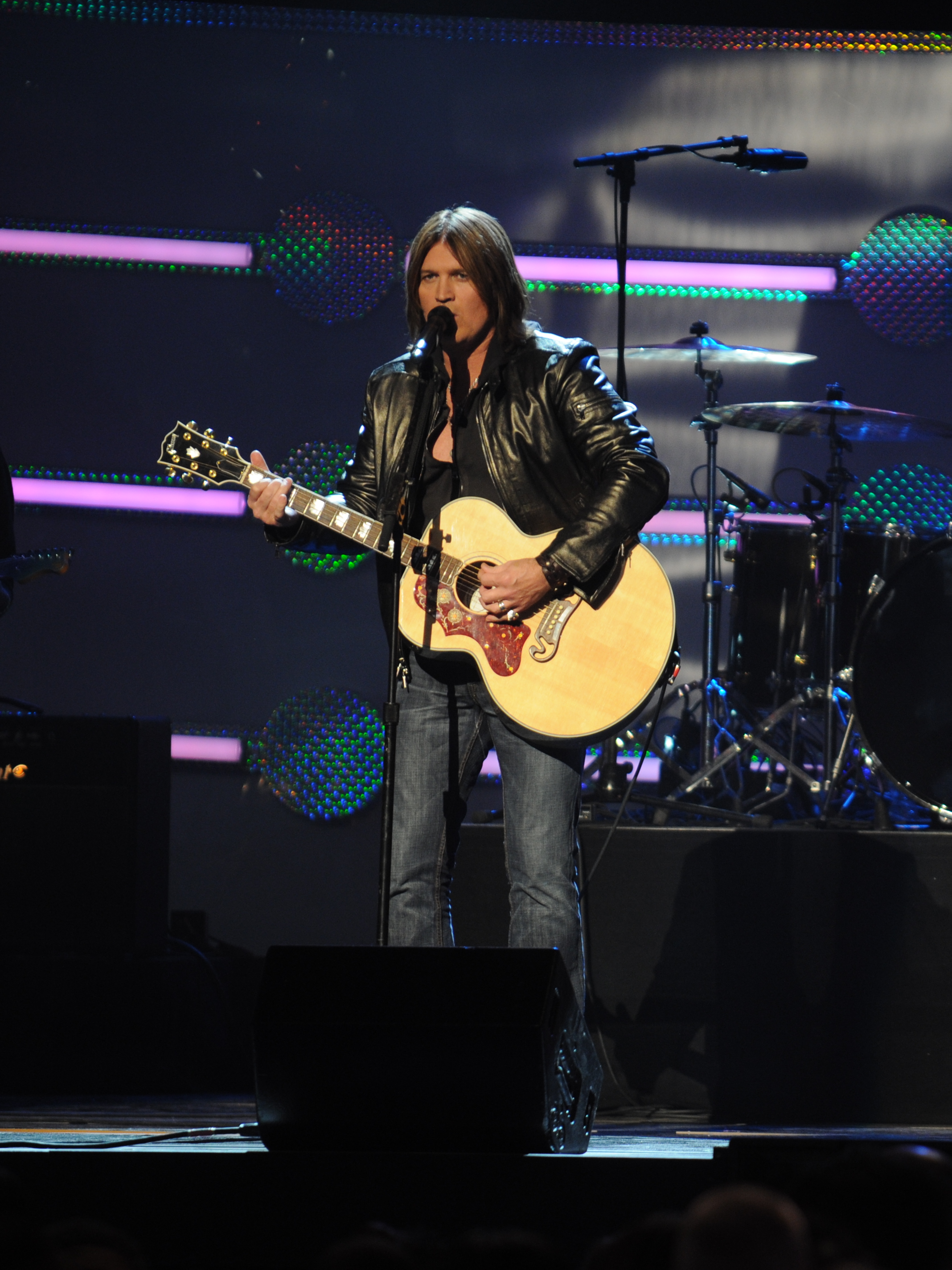
Awards and nominations
Award	Wins	Nominations
American Music Awards	3	10
Academy of Country Music Awards	0	6
Billboard Music Awards	1	1
Billboard Music Video Conference & Awards	2	2
Canadian Country Music Association Awards	1	1
Country Music Association Awards	2	3
Grammy Awards	2	7
Juno Awards	1	2
TNN/Music City News Country Awards	6	16
World Music Awards	1	1

Totals (Note: Certain award groups do not simply award one winner. They acknowledge several different recipients, have runners-up, and have third place. Since this is a specific recognition and is different from losing an award, runner-up mentions are considered wins in this award tally. For simplification and to avoid errors, each award in this list has been presumed to have had a prior nomination.)
- Wins: 48
- Nominations: 93

Billy Ray Cyrus is an American country music singer who has released twelve studio albums and forty-four singles since his debut in 1992 with Some Gave All. Cyrus won many awards as an artist, as an actor and as a humanitarian and was inducted into the VFW Hall of Fame for "his outstanding career as a country singer and in sincere appreciation for his support of America's veterans". Furthermore, he was inducted into the Walkway of Stars of the Country Music Hall of Fame.

This is a partial list of awards and nominations, with forty-one wins and seventy-two nominations. In his wins, he has received major awards like the American Music Awards, Billboard Music Awards and Country Music Association Awards.

== Country Music Association Awards ==
Year	Nominee / work	Award	Result
1992	"Achy Breaky Heart"	Single of the Year	Won
1992	"Achy Breaky Heart"	Music Video of the Year	Nominated
2019	"Old Town Road" (with Lil Nas X)	Musical Event of the Year	Won

== Berlin Music Video Awards ==
Year	Nominee / work	Award	Result
2020	OLD TOWN ROAD	Best Concept	Nominated

== Billboard Music Awards ==
Year	Nominee / work	Award	Result
1992	Some Gave All	Billboard 200 Albums - Most Weeks at No. 1	Won

== Billboard Music Video Conference & Awards ==
Year	Nominee / work	Award	Result
1992	"Achy Breaky Heart"	Best Male Artist, Country	Won
1992	"Achy Breaky Heart"	Best New Artist, Country	Won

== AMOA Jukebox Awards ==
Year	Nominee / work	Award	Result
1992	"Achy Breaky Heart"	Pop Record of the Year	Won
1992	"Achy Breaky Heart"	Country Record of the Year	Won
1992	Himself	Rising Star Award	Won

== National Association of Recording Merchandisers ==
Year	Nominee / work	Award	Result
1992	Himself	Record of the Year, New Artist	Won
1992	Himself	Record of the Year, Country Male	Won
1992	Himself	Record of the Year, Male	Won
1992	Himself	Record of the Year, Overall	Won

== Country Music Television ==
Year	Nominee / work	Award	Result
1992	"Achy Breaky Heart"	Most Popular Music Video	Won
1998	Himself	Showcase Artist of February	Won

== R&R Readers Pool ==
Year	Nominee / work	Award	Result
1992	Himself	Best New Artist	Won

== People Magazine Awards ==
Year	Nominee / work	Award	Result
1992	Himself	Most Intriguing People of the Year	Won

== Country Music Hall of Fame ==
Year	Nominee / work	Award	Result
1992	Himself	Walkway of Stars	Inducted

== Juno Awards ==
Year	Nominee / work	Award	Result
1993	Some Gave All	Best Selling Album (Foreign or Domestic)	Nominated
1993	"Achy Breaky Heart"	Best Selling Single (Foreign or Domestic)	Won

== American Music Awards ==
Year	Nominee / work	Award	Result
1993	Himself	Favorite Country Male Artist	Nominated
1993	Some Gave All	Favorite Country Album	Nominated
1993	"Achy Breaky Heart"	Favorite Country Single	Won
1993	Himself	Favorite Country New Artist	Won
1994	"Romeo" (Dolly Parton & Friends)	Favorite Country Single	Nominated
2009	Hannah Montana: The Movie soundtrack	Favorite Soundtrack Album	Nominated
2019	"Old Town Road"	Collaboration of the Year	Nominated
2019	"Old Town Road"	Favorite Music Video	Nominated
2019	"Old Town Road"	Favorite Song - Pop/Rock	Nominated
2019	"Old Town Road"	Favorite Song - Rap/Hip Hop	Won

== Academy of Country Music Awards ==
Year	Nominee / work	Award	Result
1993	Some Gave All	Album of the Year	Nominated
1993	Himself	Entertainer of the Year	Nominated
1993	"Achy Breaky Heart"	Single Record of the Year	Nominated
1993	Himself	Top New Male Vocalist	Nominated
1994	It Won't Be the Last	Album of the Year	Nominated
1994	Himself	Top Male Vocalist	Nominated

== World Music Awards ==
Year	Nominee / work	Award	Result
1993	Himself	Best International New Artist of the Year	Won

== Canadian Country Music Association Awards ==
Year	Nominee / work	Award	Result
1993	Some Gave All	Top Selling Album (Foreign or Domestic)	Won

== Grammy Awards ==
Year	Nominee / work	Award	Result
1993	"Achy Breaky Heart"	Record of the Year	Nominated
1993	"Achy Breaky Heart"	Best Country Vocal Performance, Male	Nominated
1993	Himself	Best New Artist	Nominated
1994	"Romeo" (Dolly Parton & Friends)	Best Country Vocal Collaboration	Nominated
2020	"Old Town Road"	Record of the Year	Nominated
2020	"Old Town Road"	Best Pop Duo/Group Performance	Won
2020	"Old Town Road"	Best Music Video	Won

== Childhelp USA ==
Year	Nominee / work	Award	Result
1994	Himself	Humanitarian Award	Won

== University of California, Berkeley ==
Year	Nominee / work	Award	Result
1995	Himself	Popular Cultural Society's Innovator Award	Won

== State of South Carolina ==
Year	Nominee / work	Award	Result
1995	Himself	Humanitarian Award	Won

== Congressional Medal of Honor Society ==
Year	Nominee / work	Award	Result
1995	Himself	Bob Hope Award for Excellence in Entertainment	Won

== Country Music Cares ==
Year	Nominee / work	Award	Result
1995	Himself	Humanitarian Award	Won

== Country Radio Broadcasters ==
Year	Nominee / work	Award	Result
1996	Himself	Humanitarian Award	Won

== VFW Hall of Fame ==
Year	Nominee / work	Award	Result
1996	Himself	Hall of Fame	Inducted

== TNN/Music City News Country Awards ==
Year	Nominee / work	Award	Result
1993	Himself	Star of Tomorrow	Nominated
1993	Achy Breaky Heart	Single of the Year	Nominated
1993	Achy Breaky Heart	Video of the Year	Nominated
1994	Himself	Male Artist of the Year	Nominated
1994	Himself	Star of Tomorrow	Nominated
1997	Himself	Entertainer of the Year	Nominated
1997	Himself	Male Artist of the Year	Nominated
1997	Trail of Tears	Album of the Year	Nominated
1997	"Trail of Tears"	Single of the Year	Won
1997	"Trail of Tears"	Video of the Year	Nominated
1998	Himself	Entertainer of the Year	Nominated
1998	Himself	Male Artist of the Year	Won
1998	The Best of Billy Ray Cyrus: Cover to Cover	Album of the Year	Won
1998	"It's All the Same to Me"	Single of the Year	Won
1998	"It's All the Same to Me"	Song of the Year	Won
1998	"Three Little Words"	Video of the Year	Won

== Modern Screen's Country Music Magazine ==
Year	Nominee / work	Award	Result
1997	Himself	Entertainer and Male Artist	Won
1998	Himself	Entertainer and Male Artist	Won
1999	Himself	Entertainer and Male Artist	Won

== Air Force Sergeants Awards ==
Year	Nominee / work	Award	Result
1997	Himself	Americanism Award	Won

== International Entertainment Buyers Association ==
Year	Nominee / work	Award	Result
1999	Himself	Humanitarian of the Year	Won

== MusicRow Awards ==
Year	Nominee / work	Award	Result
1999	"Give My Heart to You"	Video of the Year	Won

== Dove Awards ==
Year	Nominee / work	Award	Result
2004	The Other Side	Country Album of the Year	Nominated
2005	"I Need You Now"	Country Song of the Year	Nominated

== MovieGuide Awards ==
Year	Nominee / work	Award	Result
2005	Doc ("Happy Trails" episode)	Grace Award	Nominated
2010	Christmas in Canaan (with Matt Ward)	Grace Award	Nominated

== CMT Music Awards ==
Year	Nominee / work	Award	Result
2008	"Ready, Set, Don't Go"	Tearjerker Video of the Year	Nominated

== Teen Choice Awards ==
Year	Nominee / work	Award	Result
2009	Hannah Montana	Choice TV Parental Unit	Won
2019	"Old Town Road (Remix)" (Shared with: Lil Nas X)	Choice Collaboration	Nominated
2019	"Old Town Road (Remix)" (Shared with: Lil Nas X)	Choice R&B/Hip-Hop Song	Won

== GMC Video Awards ==
Year	Nominee / work	Award	Result
2010	"Somebody Said a Prayer"	Favorite Country Video	Nominated

== Golden Raspberry Awards ==
Year	Nominee / work	Award	Result
2010	Hannah Montana: The Movie	Worst Supporting Actor	Won
2011	The Spy Next Door	Worst Supporting Actor	Nominated

== American Society of Young Musician Awards ==
Year	Nominee / work	Award	Result
2010	Himself	Best Country Artist	Won

== MTV Video Music Awards ==
The MTV Video Music Award was established in 1984 by MTV to award the music videos of the year. Cyrus has won two awards out of seven nominations.

Year	Nominee / work	Award	Result
2019	Video of the Year	"Old Town Road (Remix)" (shared with Lil Nas X)	Nominated
2019	Song of the Year	"Old Town Road (Remix)" (shared with Lil Nas X)	Won
2019	Best Collaboration	"Old Town Road (Remix)" (shared with Lil Nas X)	Nominated
2019	Best Hip-Hop Video	"Old Town Road (Remix)" (shared with Lil Nas X)	Nominated
2019	Best Direction	"Old Town Road (Remix)" (shared with Lil Nas X)	Won
2019	Best Editing	"Old Town Road (Remix)" (shared with Lil Nas X)	Nominated
2019	Best Art Direction	"Old Town Road (Remix)" (shared with Lil Nas X)	Nominated
