= Wanna Be Your Joe =

Studio album by Billy Ray Cyrus
- Released: July 17, 2006
- Genre: Country
- Length: 58:17
- Label: New Door, UM^{e}
- Producer: Billy Ray Cyrus

Billy Ray Cyrus chronology
The Definitive Collection (2004)	Wanna Be Your Joe (2006)	Home at Last (2007)

Singles from Wanna Be Your Joe
- 1. "Wanna Be Your Joe" Released: June 6, 2006; 2. "I Want My Mullet Back" Released: August 29, 2006

Wanna Be Your Joe is the ninth studio album released from country music artist Billy Ray Cyrus. Released on July 17, 2006 on New Door Records and UM^{e}, it was Cyrus' first country album since 2000's Southern Rain. It is also his first album of non-gospel music in three years. From Billy Ray's exposure on Hannah Montana, the album debuted and peaked at number 24 on the U.S. Billboard Top Country Albums chart, number 113 on the Billboard 200 and number 118 on the Billboard Top Comprehensive Albums. The album sold well, but no hit single was released. The title track and "I Want My Mullet Back" were released as singles, but both failed to chart on the U.S. Billboard Hot Country Songs chart.

== Content ==
The album features collaborations with Cyrus' daughter, Miley Cyrus, and a song with George Jones and Loretta Lynn. The song with Miley, "Stand", was made into a music video, but was not released as a single. "Country Music Has the Blues" is the song with Jones and Lynn; it was co-written with Cyrus' son, Trace Cyrus, lead singer for the pop group, Metro Station.

On the track "The Freebird Fell", Cyrus co-wrote the song with Lynyrd Skynyrd guitarist Ed King and drummer Artimus Pyle. Also, fellow country singer Mark Collie contributes to the track "What About Us"; co-written with Cyrus and Terry Shelton.

Also, the album has two hidden tracks. The song "Without You" was originally on Cyrus' 2000 album Southern Rain, but was not released as a single. "One Night" is the second hidden track. It was originally a UK Singles Chart number-one single for Elvis Presley in 1958.

== Reception ==
Professional ratings
Review scores
Source	Rating
About.com	4/5 stars
AllMusic	3.5/5 stars
Slant	2.5/5 stars

AllMusic gave the album 3.5 stars out of 5. Although they said the album had been labored over and revised.

On the one hand, there's a collection of romantic ballads — "Wanna Be Your Joe," "I Wouldn't Be Me," "What About Us," "I Wonder," "Lonely Wins," "How've Ya Been," and "Ole What's Her Name" — that run the gamut from sincere pledges of commitment to expressions of frustration and outright kiss-offs.

The album debuted at number 113 on the Billboard 200, number 118 on the Top Comprehensive Albums and number 24 on the Top Country Albums chart, where it stayed at the peak position for two consecutive weeks. Although the title track was released on June 6, 2006, it failed to chart on the country music charts. A second single, "I Want My Mullet Back," was released later in 2006, but it also failed to chart. Cyrus left New Door Records by the end of 2006 and signed with Walt Disney Records, due to the lackluster success of the album and its singles.

== Track listing ==
All tracks are written by Billy Ray Cyrus; additional writing credits below.

No.	Title	Writer(s)	Length
1.	"Wanna Be Your Joe"		3:12
2.	"I Want My Mullet Back"		3:18
3.	"The Man"	Paul Abraham	3:26
4.	"I Wouldn't Be Me"	Jeff Tweel	4:10
5.	"What About Us"	Terry Shelton, Mark Collie	3:01
6.	"Country Music Has the Blues" (with George Jones and Loretta Lynn)	Trace Cyrus	2:55
7.	"The Freebird Fell"	Ed King, Artimus Pyle	4:59
8.	"I Wonder"		3:46
9.	"Lonely Wins"		3:28
10.	"How've Ya Been"		3:19
11.	"Ole What's Her Name"		4:25
12.	"Hey Daddy"		3:47
13.	"Stand" (with Miley Cyrus)	Andy Dodd, Adam Watts	4:19

Bouns Track/Hidden Track
No.	Title	Writer(s)	Length
14.	"A Pain in My Gas" (bonus track)		3:49
15.	"Without You" (bonus track)	Cyrus, Jude Cole	3:41
16.	"One Night" (hidden track)	Dave Bartholomew, Pearl King, Anita Steiman	2:25

== Personnel ==
- Maxwell Abrams - saxophone
- David Briggs - keyboards
- Pat Buchanan - electric guitar
- David J. Carpenter - bass guitar
- Billy Ray Cyrus - acoustic guitar, lead vocals, background vocals
- Miley Cyrus - duet vocals on "Stand"
- Andy Dodd - electric guitar, keyboards
- Dan Dugmore - steel guitar, lap steel guitar
- Jennifer Duncan - background vocals
- Lee Hendricks - bass guitar
- Corky Holbrook - bass guitar
- George Jones - vocals on "Country Music Has the Blues"
- Loretta Lynn - vocals on "Country Music Had the Blues"
- Brent Mason - electric guitar
- Greg Morrow - drums
- Leslie Patterson - background vocals
- Dave Pomeroy - bass guitar
- Terry Shelton - acoustic guitar, electric guitar, drums
- Barton Stevens - accordion, horns, keyboards
- Adam Watts - drums, acoustic guitar, background vocals
- John Willis - acoustic guitar

== Chart performance ==
The album debuted at number 24 on the Billboard Top Country Albums chart in 2006, number 113 on the all-genre Billboard 200 chart and number 118 on the all-genre Billboard Top Comprehensive Albums chart, even after failing to release a hit single to county radio.

Chart (2006)	Peak position
U.S. Billboard 200	113
U.S. Billboard Top Comprehensive Albums	118
U.S. Billboard Top Country Albums	24
