= 20th Century Masters – The Millennium Collection: The Best of Billy Ray Cyrus =

Greatest hits album by Billy Ray Cyrus
- Released: March 23, 2003
- Recorded: 1992–1998
- Genre: Country
- Label: Mercury Nashville
- Producer: Various

Billy Ray Cyrus chronology
The Other Side (2003)	20th Century Masters – The Millennium Collection: The Best of Billy Ray Cyrus (2003)	The Definitive Collection (2004)

20th Century Masters – The Millennium Collection: The Best of Billy Ray Cyrus is a compilation album released from Billy Ray Cyrus. The album was released on March 23, 2003, via Mercury Nashville Records. The album debuted and peaked at number 59 on the U.S. Billboard Top Country Albums chart. The album was released as part of Universal Music Group's 20th Century Masters – The Millennium Collection series. The album was released without Cyrus' supervision, and no new material was recorded for this album.

== Track listing ==
No.	Title	Writer(s)	Length
1.	"Achy Breaky Heart"	Don Von Tress	3:23
2.	"Some Gave All"	Billy Ray Cyrus, Cindy Cyrus	4:05
3.	"Could've Been Me"	Monty Powell, Reed Nielsen	3:44
4.	"She's Not Cryin' Anymore"	B. R. Cyrus, Buddy Cannon, Terry Shelton	3:25
5.	"Wher'm I Gonna Live?"	B. R. Cyrus, C. Cyrus	3:29
6.	"In the Heart of a Woman"	Keith Hinton, Brett Cartwright	4:00
7.	"Somebody New"	Alex Harvey, Mike Curtis	3:45
8.	"Words By Heart"	Powell, Nielsen	3:07
9.	"It's All the Same to Me"	Jerry Leseter, Kerry Kurt Phillips	4:25
10.	"Busy Man"	George Teren, Bob Regan	3:17

== Critical reception ==
Professional ratings
Review scores
Source	Rating
Allmusic	4/5 stars

20th Century Masters – The Millennium Collection: The Best of Billy Ray Cyrus received four out of five stars from Stephen Thomas Erlewine of Allmusic. In his review, Erlewine praises the album as "a far better bargain than the previous Cyrus collection, and one that's not likely to be bettered anytime soon."

== Chart performance ==
20th Century Masters – The Millennium Collection: The Best of Billy Ray Cyrus peaked at number 59 on the U.S. Billboard Top Country Albums chart.

Chart (2003)	Peak position
U.S. Billboard Top Country Albums	59
