= Waycross =

Waycross may refer to:

- Waycross, Georgia
  - Waycross micropolitan area
- Waycross College (1973–2013), a former two-year public college in the U.S. state of Georgia
- Waycross, an American country music duo known for originally recording the song "Nineteen"
