= Set the Record Straight =

Set the Record Straight may refer to:

- Set the Record Straight (Billy Ray Cyrus album)
- Set the Record Straight (Fast Crew album)
- "Set the Record Straight" (Tee Grizzley song)
- "Set the Record Straight" (Reef song)
