= Real Gone (song) =

2006 single by Sheryl Crow

Single by Sheryl Crow

from the album Cars: The Soundtrack
- Released: June 6, 2006
- Recorded: 2005
- Genre: Country rock; cowpunk
- Length: 3:22
- Label: A&M; Walt Disney
- Songwriters: Sheryl Crow; John Shanks
- Producer: John Shanks

Sheryl Crow singles chronology
"Building Bridges" (2006)	"Real Gone" (2006)	"Not Fade Away" (2007)

Audio
- "Real Gone" on YouTube

"Real Gone" is a song written by Sheryl Crow and John Shanks for the 2006 Pixar film Cars. Crow's version of the song is the second single to the official soundtrack album to the film.

The song charted to No. 76 on the Billboard Pop 100, as well as No. 1 on the Billboard Bubbling Under Hot 100 singles chart.

According to the sheet music published at MusicNotes.com, the song is written in the key of C major (recorded a half-step lower in B major).

== Charts ==
Chart (2006)	Peak position
US Bubbling Under Hot 100 (Billboard)	1
US Pop 100 (Billboard)	76

== Certifications ==
Region	Certification	Certified units/sales
Australia (ARIA)	Gold	35,000^{‡}
United Kingdom (BPI)	Silver	200,000^{‡}
United States (RIAA)	Gold	500,000^{‡}
^{‡} Sales+streaming figures based on certification alone.

== Cover versions ==
=== Billy Ray Cyrus version ===
"Real Gone"

Single by Billy Ray Cyrus

from the album Disneymania 6, Country Sings Disney, and Back to Tennessee
- Released: June 17, 2008
- Genre: Country; country rock
- Length: 3:40
- Label: Walt Disney, Lyric Street
- Songwriters: Sheryl Crow, John Shanks
- Producer: Mark Bright

Billy Ray Cyrus singles chronology
"Ready, Set, Don't Go" (2007)	"Real Gone" (2008)	"Somebody Said a Prayer" (2008)

Audio
- "Real Gone" on YouTube

Country singer Billy Ray Cyrus covered the song for the album Disneymania 6. It was made into a music video directed by Trey Fanjoy. It was released as a digital single only on June 18, 2008, after being featured on the compilation album Country Sings Disney. The song is also available on his 2009 album Back to Tennessee.

=== Honor Society version ===
Pop rock band Honor Society also covered the song for Disneymania 7.
