= Home at Last (Billy Ray Cyrus album) =

Studio album by Billy Ray Cyrus
- Released: July 24, 2007
- Recorded: 2007
- Studios: Ocean Way (Hollywood); Sound Emporium (Nashville); The Tracking Room (Nashville); Your Place or Mind (Glendale); Fireside (Nashville); The Jungle Room (Glendale)
- Genre: Country
- Length: 52:17
- Label: Walt Disney
- Producer: Fred Mollin

Billy Ray Cyrus chronology
Wanna Be Your Joe (2006)	Home at Last (2007)	Love Songs (2008)

Singles from Home at Last
- 1. "Ready, Set, Don't Go" Released: October 10, 2007

Professional ratings
Review scores
Source	Rating
About.com	4/5 stars
AllMusic	3.5/5 stars
Common Sense Media	2/5 stars
Country Weekly	(average)

Home at Last is the tenth studio album by American singer and actor, Billy Ray Cyrus. It was released on July 24, 2007, and is follow-up album to Wanna Be Your Joe, which was released in 2006. Home at Last is Cyrus' debut and only album to date for Walt Disney Records.

The album debuted and peaked at number 3 on the U.S. Billboard Top Country Albums, and number 20 on the Billboard 200 and on the Billboard Top Comprehensive Albums. This became Cyrus's first album in 13 years to reach certification as it is certified Gold by the RIAA for sales of 500,000 copies. It also set a record for a father-daughter duo to have their own Top 20 album on the Billboard 200. When Home at Last debuted, Miley's album, Hannah Montana 2: Meet Miley Cyrus was at number 1.

== Background ==
The album's lead-off single, "Ready, Set, Don't Go", debuted at number 47 for the chart week of August 11, 2007, on the Billboard Hot Country Songs, making it Billy Ray's first chart entry since 2004 with "The Other Side". On October 9, 2007, Billy Ray and Miley performed a duet of the song on Dancing with the Stars.

The duet debuted on the chart on October 27, 2007, at number 27. It eventually reached number 4 on the country charts, giving Billy Ray his first Top 5 single since "Busy Man" reached number 3 in 1999. It was also Miley's first Top 5 on any Billboard chart, as well as her first release to country radio.

After "Ready, Set, Don't Go" fell from the country music charts, no further singles were released. Cyrus began to work on his next studio album. The album was released on Lyric Street Records on April 7, 2009. It was titled Back to Tennessee.

The track "Stand" was originally recorded as a duet with Miley Cyrus on Billy Ray's previous album Wanna Be Your Joe. However, the song was remixed without Miley's vocals and was added to Home at Last.

== Track listing ==
No.	Title	Writer(s)	Length
1.	"Ready, Set, Don't Go"	Cyrus, Casey Beathard	4:06
2.	"The Beginning"	Jack Wallin	3:56
3.	"The Buffalo"	Tom Douglas, Andy Goldmark	3:55
4.	"Flying By"	Joanna Smith, Tom Hambridge, Jeffrey Steele	3:57
5.	"Brown Eyed Girl"	Van Morrison	3:43
6.	"Don't Give Up on Me"	Walt Aldridge, James LeBlanc	3:22
7.	"You've Got a Friend" (featuring Emily Osment)	Carole King	4:24
8.	"You Can't Lose Me"	Diane Warren	4:01
9.	"I Can't Live Without Your Love"	Brad Crisler, LeBlanc	3:42
10.	"My Everything"	Cyrus	3:29
11.	"Put a Little Love in Your Heart"	James R. Holiday, James Randy Myers, Jackie DeShannon	3:12
12.	"Over the Rainbow"	Harold Arlen, E. Y. "Yip" Harburg	5:18
13.	"Stand"	Cyrus, Adam Watts, Andy Dodd	3:58
14.	"Ready, Set, Don't Go" (featuring Miley Cyrus)	Cyrus, Beathard	3:48

== Personnel ==
- Billy Ray Cyrus – lead vocals, backing vocals

Additional musicians:

- David Angell – violin
- Kenny Aronoff – drums
- Sam Bacco – percussion
- Richard Bennett – acoustic guitar
- Mike Brignardello – bass
- Pat Buchanan – electric guitar
- Tom Bukovac – electric guitar
- Tim Buppert – backing vocals
- David J. Carpenter – bass
- Butch Carr – backing vocals
- John Catchings – cello
- Vinnie Colaiuta – drums
- Miley Cyrus – vocals on track 14
- Matt Dame – backing vocals
- Eric Darken – percussion
- David Davidson – violin
- Andy Dodd – electric guitar, piano
- Dan Dugmore – steel guitar
- Stuart Duncan – mandocello
- Connie Ellisor – violin
- Kenny Greenberg – electric guitar
- Jim Grosjean – viola
- Tom Hambridge – backing vocals
- James Harrah – acoustic guitar, electric guitar
- Tony Harrell – accordion, keyboard
- Aubrey Haynie – fiddle
- John Hobbs – keyboard
- Mike Johnson – steel guitar
- Troy Johnson – backing vocals
- John Jorgenson – electric guitar, banjo
- Shane Keister – keyboard
- Karima Kibble – choir
- Sherrie Kibble – choir
- Anthony LaMarchina – cello
- Paul Leim – drums, percussion
- Matthew McMauley – conductor, string arrangement
- Fred Mollin – 12-string acoustic guitar, Hammond organ, synthesizer, backing vocals
- Greg Morrow – drums
- Kathy Niebank – backing vocals
- Emily Osment – vocals on track 7
- Dean Parks – dobro, acoustic guitar, electric guitar, mandolin
- Larry Paxton – bass
- Shandra Penix – choir
- Matt Rollings – keyboard
- Joe Scaife – backing vocals
- Pam Sixfin – violin
- Elisabeth K. Small – violin
- Chris Stapleton – backing vocals
- Peter Stengaard – bass, keyboard, backing vocals
- Mary Kathryn Van Osdale – violin
- Adam Watts – drums, acoustic guitar, backing vocals
- John Paul White – backing vocals
- Kris Wilkinson – viola
- John Willis – acoustic guitar, electric guitar, mandolin, soloist
- Karen Winklemann – violin
- Suzanne Young – choir
- Russ Zavitson – backing vocals

== Chart performance ==
The album debuted at number 3 on Billboard's Top Country Albums chart; Cyrus' first Top 5 album since It Won't Be the Last in 1993. It also debuted at number 20 on the all-genres charts Billboard 200 and Billboard's Top Comprehensive Albums, selling approximately 30,000 copies in its first official week of release. To date, the album has sold over 297,000 copies in the United States and over 500,000 copies worldwide.

Weekly charts

Chart (2007)	Peak position
US Billboard 200	20
US Top Country Albums (Billboard)	3

Year-end charts

Chart (2007)	Position
US Top Country Albums (Billboard)	46

Singles

Year	Single	Peak chart positions		
Year	Single	US Country	US	CAN
2007	"Ready, Set, Don't Go"	33	76	—
2007	"Ready, Set, Don't Go" (with Miley Cyrus)	4	37	47
