= Butterfly Fly Away =

Song by Miley Cyrus and Billy Ray Cyrus

from the album Hannah Montana: The Movie
- Released: March 24, 2009
- Recorded: 2008
- Genre: Country
- Length: 3:09; 4:44 (extended version)
- Label: Walt Disney Records
- Songwriters: Glen Ballard; Alan Silvestri
- Producers: Glen Ballard; Alan Silvestri

"Butterfly Fly Away" is a 2009 duet performed by American actors and recording artists Miley Cyrus and Billy Ray Cyrus. The song was first heard in the 2009 film Hannah Montana: The Movie, in which both Cyruses star, and was subsequently released on the film's soundtrack. An extended version is featured on Billy Ray's eleventh studio album, Back to Tennessee. The song is a soft country ballad with lyrics that describe a child's transition to adulthood.

The song received generally favorable reviews and, though not released as a single, achieved notable commercial outcomes in Australia, Canada, Ireland, the United Kingdom, and the United States. It reached its highest international peak in the Irish Singles Chart, at number forty-six. The Cyruses performed the song live at several venues; a performance in an English Apple Store was recorded and eventually released on an extended play.

== Background ==
"Butterfly Fly Away" (2009)
A sample of Miley and Billy Ray Cyrus's "Butterfly Fly Away". The ballad's lyrics use a metaphor to compare the metamorphosis of a butterfly and a child's coming of age.

As with Miley and Ray Cyrus's last duet, "Ready, Set, Don't Go" (2007), "Butterfly Fly Away" describes a child's transition to adulthood. The song was written and produced by Glen Ballard and Alan Silvestri for the 2009 film Hannah Montana: The Movie. According to the film, when main character Miley Stewart (played by Miley Cyrus) was young, her father Robby Ray Stewart (played by Billy Ray Cyrus), would often tell her that while a caterpillar may not be able to move much, it can still dream about the butterfly it will one day be. This comment became a recurring motif in the film and provided the basis for the lyrics to "Butterfly Fly Away", which use a caterpillar's metamorphosis as a metaphor for a child's coming of age. In Hannah Montana: The Movie, the Cyruses perform the song as their characters in "a tender movie scene under a gazebo in the rain". Billy Ray said filming the scene was "a pretty special moment. The song itself was written by Glen Ballard, a masterful songwriter who wrote 'Man in the Mirror' for Michael Jackson. I knew it was a pretty special song [...] and it certainly comes at a nice spot in the movie."

The contemporary country duet is set in common time with a gentle tempo of 69 beats per minute. The song's vocals range two octaves, from C♯_{3} to B_{4}. The song is written in a key of B major and features the chord progression, Esus2—B—C♯7.

== Critical reception ==
Reviewers gave the song moderately positive reviews. Warren Truit of About.com found it "sentimental" while Scott Mervis of the Pittsburgh Post-Gazette called it "a sweet duet". Allmusic reviewer Heather Phares said the song was "a treacly duet". Stephen Thomas Erlewine, also of Allmusic, was more negative, calling it a "syrupy, icky" song on which Billy Ray never sounds quite right. Leah Greenblatt of Entertainment Weekly wrote, "[Miley's] delicate duet with dad Billy Ray, 'Butterfly Fly Away,' is quietly lovely." Billboard reviewer Ken Tucker stated that it "is an airy and flowing song about family on which father and daughter's voices blend nicely". Michael Rechtshaffen of The Hollywood Reporter called "Butterfly Fly Away" a "tender Glen Ballard/Alan Silvestri ballad". The song was included on the short list for Best Original Song at the 82nd Academy Awards, but did not achieve a nomination.

== Chart performance ==
"Butterfly Fly Away" debuted at number seventy-two on the Billboard Hot 100 the week ending April 25, 2009. The following week, May 2, 2009, the song reached its peak on the Hot 100 at number fifty-six. The song spent a total of three consecutive weeks on the chart. On the week ending April 25, 2009, "Butterfly Fly Away" debuted at number seventy-six in the Canadian Hot 100. The following week the song reached its peak at number-fifty on the chart. The song charted for a longer amount of time in Canada than its home country, with four weeks on the chart.

The song encountered similar commercial outcomes in various nations. In the United Kingdom, the song debuted and peaked at number seventy-eight for the week ending May 16, 2009. "Butterfly Fly Away" reached its highest international peak in the Irish Singles Chart. It debuted at number forty-seven on the week ending May 7, 2009. The song ultimately peaked at number forty-six on the chart. It also peaked at number fifty-six in the Australian Singles Chart.

== Live performances ==
The Cyruses performed the song on Good Morning America on April 8, 2009, along with performances of "Full Circle", "Hoedown Throwdown" and "The Climb". They included the song in their set for the AOL Sessions, recorded on April 13, 2009. They also performed the song in London in an Apple Store, along with a duet version of Billy Ray's "Thrillbilly" and several of their own singles. The set, along with some songs by Cyrus's father, was sold exclusively by the United Kingdom iTunes Store as an extended play titled iTunes Live from London.

== Charts ==
Chart (2009)	Peak position
Australia (ARIA)	56
Canada Hot 100 (Billboard)	50
Ireland (IRMA)	46
UK Singles (Official Charts)	78
US Billboard Hot 100	56

== Certifications ==
Region	Certification	Certified units/sales
Australia (ARIA)	Platinum	70,000^{‡}
New Zealand (RMNZ)	Gold	15,000^{‡}
United Kingdom (BPI)	Silver	200,000^{‡}
United States (RIAA)	Platinum	1,000,000^{‡}
^{‡} Sales+streaming figures based on certification alone.
