= Country Sings Disney =

Compilation album by Various artists
- Released: July 8, 2008
- Genre: Country pop
- Length: 54:39
- Label: Walt Disney; Lyric Street

Country Sings Disney is a compilation album featuring the biggest stars in country music. Tim McGraw, Faith Hill, Billy Ray Cyrus, Martina McBride and several others appear on the album. It was released on July 8, 2008, by Walt Disney Records and Lyric Street Records. The album debuted at No. 15 on the U.S. Top Country Albums chart, and No. 91 on the all-genre Billboard 200.

== Track listing ==
The track listing is as follows:

1. "Ready, Set, Don't Go" - Billy Ray Cyrus ft. Miley Cyrus (3:49)
2. "Life is a Highway" - Rascal Flatts (4:34)
3. "Wherever the Trail May Lead" - Tim McGraw (3:33)
4. "Through Your Eyes" - Martina McBride (4:07)
5. "Blue Beyond" - Trisha Yearwood (3:08)
6. "You'll Be in My Heart" - Bucky Covington (4:24)
7. "Can You Feel the Love Tonight" - Phil Stacey (5:01)
8. "Will the Sun Ever Shine Again" - Bonnie Raitt (2:36)
9. "There Is Life" - Alison Krauss (2:20)
10. "When I See an Elephant Fly" - Josh Gracin (2:57)
11. "Baby Mine" - SHeDAISY (3:56)
12. "We Go Together" - Little Big Town (3:09)
13. "Part of Your World" - Faith Hill (3:22)
14. "Find Yourself" - Brad Paisley (4:11)
15. "Real Gone" - Billy Ray Cyrus (3:32)

== Chart performance ==
Chart (2008)	Peak position
U.S. Billboard Top Country Albums	15
U.S. Billboard 200	91

== See also ==
- The Best of Country Sing the Best of Disney - A similar compilation of country music artists performing Disney songs released in 1996.
