= Everyone's a Dreamer =

Studio album by Clayton Bellamy
- Released: March 6, 2012
- Genre: Country
- Length: 41:25
- Label: MDM Recordings
- Producer: Ray Kennedy; Gary Nicholson

Clayton Bellamy chronology
Everyone's a Dreamer (2012)	Five Crow Silver (2013)

Singles from Everyone's a Dreamer
- 1. "Everyone's a Dreamer" Released: January 2, 2012; 2. "That Ain't Gonna Fly" Released: May 28, 2012; 3. "Straight Into the Sun" Released: October 2012

Professional ratings
Review scores
Source	Rating
Winnipeg Free Press	3/5 stars

Everyone's a Dreamer is the debut studio album by Canadian country music artist Clayton Bellamy. It was released on March 6, 2012 by MDM Recordings. The album received three stars out of five from Bruce Leperre of the Winnipeg Free Press.

== Track listing ==
No.	Title	Length
1.	"That Ain't Gonna Fly"	3:47
2.	"It All Comes Back to You"	3:29
3.	"Everyone's a Dreamer"	2:58
4.	"Heart with Wings"	2:51
5.	"Love Like That"	3:11
6.	"Nineteen"	3:13
7.	"All Night Long"	3:20
8.	"Straight Into the Sun"	3:34
9.	"Mood Ring"	3:57
10.	"Alberta Bones"	3:32
11.	"Drop'er in Low"	3:25
12.	"Last of the True Believers"	4:08
