= I'm American =

Studio album by Billy Ray Cyrus
- Released: June 28, 2011
- Genre: Country
- Length: 32:26
- Label: Buena Vista
- Producer: Buddy Cannon

Billy Ray Cyrus chronology
Icon (2011)	I'm American (2011)	Change My Mind (2012)

Singles from I'm American
- 1. "Runway Lights" Released: July 11, 2011; 2. "Nineteen" Released: September 26, 2011

I'm American is the twelfth studio album released by American country music singer Billy Ray Cyrus.

The album, released on June 28, 2011, is composed of patriotic songs, including a re-recording of Cyrus' song "Some Gave All", which originally appeared on his debut album of the same name. The re-recording features vocals from country music singers Darryl Worley, Craig Morgan, and Jamey Johnson. It was intended on being released as the album's first single, however, in 2011, the single was changed to "Runway Lights". The second single, "Nineteen", was released on September 26, 2011.

== Background ==
I'm American was initially scheduled to be released in November 2010. After being pushed back numerous times, it was released on June 28, 2011. In early 2011, a re-recording of "Some Gave All" was planned to be the first single released from the album. The song, which features vocals from singers Darryl Worley, Craig Morgan, and Jamey Johnson, was pulled from radio and replaced with "Runway Lights". The latter song was released as the lead-off single from the album. "Runway Lights" is also the theme song to Cyrus' new show, Surprise Homecoming, which debuted on TLC, May 30, 2011.

On May 12, 2011, Cyrus announced via The Boot that he was planning on retiring from recording after releasing I'm American, but he stated that he would continue to perform live because he "loves playing in a band." However he wrote numerous songs surrounding issues with the separation and reconciliation with his wife, and wants to record those for one final album.

== Reception ==
=== Commercial ===
I'm American debuted at number 153 on the US Billboard 200 and number 24 on the US Billboard Top Country Albums, with first week sales of 3,797 copies. The album's first single, Runway Lights", failed to enter the US Billboard Hot Country Songs chart. However, the second single, "Nineteen", debuted on the country chart at number 58 for the week ending October 8, 2011. It is Cyrus' first charted single since "A Good Day" peaked at number 59 on the country chart in September 2009.

=== Critical ===
Professional ratings
Review scores
Source	Rating
About.com	3/5 stars
Allmusic	3/5 stars
Entertainment Weekly	B−
Taste of Country	3.5/5 stars

Stephen Thomas Erlewine of Allmusic gave the album a three-out-of-five star rating. Erlewine said that Cyrus "sounds like a ruminative, mumbling Bruce Springsteen, so Billy Ray muscularly strums his guitar while rhapsodizing about the downtrodden working class." He also went on to say that I'm American is more relaxed than Cyrus' album Home at Last, by saying it is sincere in Cyrus' singing and what he's singing about. He finished his review by saying I'm American is "more engaging than his last few attempts to make country-pop that appeals to everybody".

Billy Dukes from Taste of Country reviewed the album positively, giving it three-and-half stars out of five. Dukes praised Cyrus' patriotism, and packing every song on the album with plenty of emotion. He goes on to describe "Nineteen" and "We Fought Hard" as songs of soldiers who didn't make it home from war, and noted they are predictable, powerful ballads that may leave some needing a tissue. Dukes also commented on the re-recording of "Some Gave All", saying that it was not any better or worse than the original. He closed by saying Cyrus gives a great effort, as he does with everything he touches.

== Track listing ==
No.	Title	Writer(s)	Length
1.	"Runway Lights"	Jameson Clark, Mark Irwin, Josh Kear	3:44
2.	"We Fought Hard"	Ross Copperman, Heather Morgan	4:35
3.	"Keep the Light On"	Bill Brandt, Walter Brandt, Keith Volpone	4:04
4.	"Stripes and Stars" (featuring Amy Grant)	Andy Dodd, Canaan Smith	4:00
5.	"I'm American"	Billy Ray Cyrus, Dave Henning, Dahniel Knight, Samantha Maloney, James Miller	4:31
6.	"Old Army Hat"	Walt Aldridge, Bill Anderson	4:04
7.	"Nineteen"	Tom Hambridge, Jeffrey Steele, Gary Nicholson	3:18
8.	"Some Gave All" (featuring Darryl Worley, Craig Morgan, and Jamey Johnson)	B. R. Cyrus, Cindy Cyrus	4:18

== Personnel ==
- Bob Bailey – background vocals
- Bucky Baxter – steel guitar
- Wyatt Beard – background vocals
- Pat Buchanan – electric guitar
- Buddy Cannon – background vocals
- Melonie Cannon – background vocals
- Butch Carr – synthesizer
- J.T. Corenflos – electric guitar
- Billy Ray Cyrus – lead vocals, background vocals
- Chip Davis – background vocals
- Amy Grant – vocals on "Stripes and Stars"
- Kenny Greenberg – electric guitar
- Wes Hightower – background vocals
- Jamey Johnson – vocals on "Some Gave All"
- Paul Leim – drums
- Randy McCormick – Hammond B-3 organ, piano, synthesizer
- Craig Morgan – vocals on "Some Gave All"
- Larry Paxton – bass guitar
- Gary Prim – Hammond B-3 organ, piano
- Angela Primm – background vocals
- Mickey Raphael – harmonica
- Deanie Richardson – fiddle
- Scott Vestal – banjo
- Gale Mayes-West – background vocals
- John Willis – banjo, acoustic guitar
- Darryl Worley – vocals on "Some Gave All"

== Chart performance ==
=== Album ===
Chart (2011)	Peak position
US Billboard 200	153
US Billboard Top Country Albums	24

=== Singles ===
Year	Single	Peak positions
Year	Single	US Country
2011	"Runway Lights"	—
2011	"Nineteen"	58
"—" denotes releases that did not chart
