= The Best of Country Sing the Best of Disney =

Compilation album by Various artists
- Released: September 10, 1996
- Genre: Country, country pop
- Label: Walt Disney
- Producer: Gary Burr

Professional ratings
Review scores
Source	Rating
Allmusic	3/5 stars

The Best of Country Sing the Best of Disney is an album featuring country music artists singing Disney songs. It was released on September 10, 1996 by Walt Disney Records. The album peaked at number 17 on the Billboard Top Country Albums chart and number 107 on the all-genre Billboard 200.

== Track listing ==
No.	Title	Writer(s)	Performer(s)	Length
1.	"Kiss the Girl"	Howard Ashman, Alan Menken	Little Texas	3:35
2.	"Beauty and the Beast"	Ashman, Menken	Diamond Rio	3:41
3.	"Someday My Prince Will Come"	Frank Churchill, Larry Morey	Tanya Tucker	3:52
4.	"Baby Mine"	Churchill, Ned Washington	Alison Krauss	3:36
5.	"A Whole New World"	Menken, Tim Rice	Collin Raye	3:16
6.	"Colors of the Wind"	Menken, Stephen Schwartz	Pam Tillis	4:20
7.	"You've Got a Friend in Me"	Randy Newman	George Jones and Kathy Mattea	2:34
8.	"Can You Feel the Love Tonight"	Elton John, Rice	Larry Stewart	3:35
9.	"Part of Your World"	Ashman, Menken	Faith Hill	3:22
10.	"If I Never Knew You"	Menken, Schwartz	Hal Ketchum and Shelby Lynne	4:14
11.	"Someday"	Menken, Schwartz	Lee Roy Parnell	3:55
12.	"When You Wish Upon a Star"	Leigh Harline, Washington	Bryan White	3:00

== Chart performance ==
Chart (1996)	Peak position
U.S. Billboard Top Country Albums	17
U.S. Billboard 200	107
Canadian RPM Country Albums	9

== See also ==
Country Sings Disney - A similar compilation of country music artists singing Disney songs released in 2008.
