= Change My Mind (album) =

Studio album by Billy Ray Cyrus
- Released: October 23, 2012
- Genre: Country
- Length: 42:24
- Label: Blue Cadillac Music
- Producer: Brandon Friesen

Billy Ray Cyrus chronology
I'm American (2011)	Change My Mind (2012)	Thin Line (2016)

Singles from Change My Mind
- 1. "Change My Mind" Released: 2012; 2. "Hillbilly Heart" Released: January 28, 2013; 3. "Hope Is Just Ahead" Released: September 19, 2013

Professional ratings
Review scores
Source	Rating
Allmusic	4/5 stars

Change My Mind is the thirteenth studio album by country singer Billy Ray Cyrus, and his first on own record label Blue Cadillac Music. It was released on October 23, 2012. The album includes a re-recording of "I'm So Miserable", a cut from Cyrus' 1992 debut Some Gave All.

== Track listing ==
All tracks are written by Billy Ray Cyrus except where noted.

No.	Title	Writer(s)	Length
1.	"Change My Mind"	Cyrus, Michael J. Sagraves	4:42
2.	"Once Again"		5:15
3.	"Hillbilly Heart"		3:42
4.	"Tomorrow Became Yesterday"		5:23
5.	"Good as Gone"		3:24
6.	"Forgot to Forget"		3:57
7.	"That's What Daddys Do"		4:10
8.	"Hope Is Just Ahead"	Cyrus, John Frederick Lenz, Don Von Tress	4:42
9.	"I'm So Miserable"	Cyrus, Corky Holbrook	3:16
10.	"Stomp"		5:53

== Chart performance ==
Chart (2012)	Peak position
US Billboard Top Country Albums	38
