= You Won't Be Lonely Now =

Single by Billy Ray Cyrus

from the album Southern Rain
- B-side: "Southern Rain"
- Released: May 8, 2000
- Genre: Country
- Length: 3:43
- Label: Monument
- Songwriters: Brett James; John Bettis
- Producer: Dann Huff

Billy Ray Cyrus singles chronology
"Give My Heart to You" (1999)	"You Won't Be Lonely Now" (2000)	"We the People" (2000)

"You Won't Be Lonely Now" is a song written by Brett James and John Bettis, and recorded by American country music singer Billy Ray Cyrus. It was released in May 2000 as the first single from the album Southern Rain. The power ballad debuted at number 62 on the Hot Country Singles & Tracks (now Hot Country Songs chart) on July 8, 2000. It was the first of five singles released from the album, as well as the highest-charting single, peaking in the Top 20.

"You Won't Be Lonely Now" was Cyrus' last Top 40 country hit until 2007, when "Ready, Set, Don't Go" reached number 4.

== Critical reception ==
William Ruhlmann of Allmusic said that the song "properly displayed the artist's sense of determination against adversity, cloaked in the terms of a love song." Billboard gave the song a rave review, writing that it "could - and should be - the turning point in Cyrus' career that gets him back on the hit track."

== Music video ==
The music video was directed by Jim Shea and premiered in June 2000. It was filmed on Jekyll Island.

== Chart performance ==
Chart (2000)	Peak position
Canada Country Singles (RPM)	33 (Note: "You Won't Be Lonely Now" had not yet peaked when RPM ceased publication in November 2000.)
US Hot Country Songs (Billboard)	17
US Billboard Hot 100	80

=== Year-end charts ===
Chart (2000)	Position
US Country Songs (Billboard)	74

== Musician credits ==
- Drums: Chris McHugh
- Bass Guitar: Mike Brignardello
- Acoustic Guitar: Dann Huff, Gordon Kennedy
- Electric Guitar: Dann Huff, Gordon Kennedy
- Steel Guitar: Paul Franklin
- Keyboards: Tim Akers, Steve Nathan
- Percussion: Eric Darken
- Background Vocals: Gene Miller, Vicki Hampton, Lisa Cochran
