= Thin Line (album) =

Studio album by Billy Ray Cyrus
- Released: September 9, 2016
- Genre: Country
- Length: 65:59
- Label: Blue Cadillac Music
- Producer: Billy Ray Cyrus, Brandon Friesen, Stewart Cararas, Jason Charles Miller, Shooter Jennings, Andrew Rollins

Billy Ray Cyrus chronology
Change My Mind (2012)	Thin Line (2016)	Set the Record Straight (2017)

Singles from Thin Line
- 1. "Hey Elvis" Released: June 6, 2016; 2. "Thin Line" Released: August 12, 2016

Thin Line is the fourteenth studio album by country singer Billy Ray Cyrus, and his second on own record label Blue Cadillac Music. It was released on September 9, 2016. The album peaked at #49 on the Country Charts.

== Track listing ==
No.	Title	Writer(s)	Producer(s)	Length
1.	"Thin Line" (featuring Shelby Lynne)	Billy Ray Cyrus		4:30
2.	"Lovin' Her Was Easier (Than Anything I'll Ever Do Again)"	Kris Kristofferson	Stewart Cararas, Jason Charles Miller	5:07
3.	"They're Playin' Our Song"	Bob DiPiero, John Jarrard, Mark D. Sanders		3:52
4.	"My Heroes Have Always Been Cowboys"	Sharon Vaughn	Cararas, Miller	3:03
5.	"Stop Pickin' on Willie"	B. R. Cyrus, Corky Holbrook, Terry Shelton	Cararas, Miller	3:09
6.	"Sunday Morning Coming Down" (featuring Shelby Lynne)	Kristofferson	Cararas, Miller	5:00
7.	"Tulsa Time" (featuring Joe Perry)	Danny Flowers	Cararas, Miller	4:02
8.	"Hillbilly On"	Dean Alexander, Skip Black, Brian Maher		4:05
9.	"Killing the Blues" (featuring Shooter Jennings)	Rowland Salley		3:51
10.	"I've Always Been Crazy" (featuring Shooter Jennings, Lee Roy Parnell)	Waylon Jennings		4:28
11.	"Hey Elvis" (featuring Bryan Adams and Glenn Hughes)	Adams, Gretchen Peters		4:11
12.	"Help Me Make It Through the Night" (featuring Kenley Shea Holm)	Kristofferson		3:10
13.	"Hope (Let It Find You)"	B. R. Cyrus, Jason Charles Miller, Andrew Rollins	Cararas, Miller, Andrew Rollins	4:25
14.	"Going Where the Lonely Go" (featuring Braison Cyrus)	Merle Haggard, Dean Holloway	Cararas, Miller	4:09
15.	"Angels Protect This Home" (featuring Miley Cyrus)	B. R. Cyrus, Miley Cyrus		8:57

== Personnel ==
Musicians

- Bryan Adams – vocals on "Hey Elvis"
- Russell Ali – electric guitar on "Lovin' Her Was Easier (Than Anything I'll Ever Do Again)" and "Going Where the Lonely Go"
- William von Arx – lead guitar on "Stop Pickin' on Willie"
- Anthony Braunagle – drums
- Alexander Burke – keyboards, mandolin, piano
- Stewart Cararas – electric guitar, bass guitar, percussion (Tracks 2, 4, 5, 6, 7, 13, 14)
- Billy Ray Cyrus – acoustic guitar, percussion, Tibetan bowls, lead vocals
- Braison Cyrus – electric guitar and vocals on "Going Where the Lonely Go"
- Miley Cyrus – percussion, Tibetan bowls, and vocals on "Angels Protect This Home"
- Jamie Douglass – drums, percussion
- Brandon Friesen – bass guitar, acoustic guitar, electric guitar, keyboards, percussion, piano
- Rebekkah Friesen – acoustic guitar, background vocals
- Tony Furtado – banjo
- Cynthia Gillet – bass guitar, background vocals
- Noah Gordon – background vocals
- Angella Grossi – percussion
- Adam Hall – banjo, dobro, lap steel guitar
- Zach Hall – bass guitar on "Tulsa Time"
- Michael "Fish" Herring – electric guitar
- Kenley Shae Holm – vocals on "Help Me Make It Through the Night"
- Glenn Hughes – vocals on "Hey Elvis" and "Hope (Let It Find You)"
- Angela Hurt – background vocals
- Shooter Jennings – acoustic guitar, electric guitar, Hammond organ, piano, programming, producer, vocals on "Killing the Blues" and "I've Always Been Crazy"
- Ted Russell Kamp – bass guitar
- Peter Keys – keyboards, piano
- Jeff King – electric guitar
- Johnny Lee – acoustic guitar
- Shelby Lynne – vocals on "Thin Line" and "Sunday Morning Coming Down"
- Reggie McBride – bass guitar
- Jason Charles Miller – bass guitar, acoustic guitar, electric guitar, keyboards, percussion, background vocals (Tracks 2, 4, 5, 6, 7, 13, 14)
- Ian Newbill – electric guitar on "My Heroes Have Always Been Cowboys"
- Lee Roy Parnell – slide guitar on "I've Always Been Crazy"
- Joe Perry – electric guitar on "Tulsa Time"
- Mark Plummer – background vocals on "Tulsa Time"
- Jimmy Pugh – Hammond organ, piano
- David Rehmann – drums
- Aubrey Richmond – fiddle
- Andrew Rollins – bass guitar, acoustic guitar, electric guitar, background vocals on "Hope (Let It Find You)"
- Wendy Starland – background vocals
- The Tambourine Brothers – tambourine
- Drew Taubenfeld – pedal steel guitar
- Cliff Wagner – banjo, fiddle

Technical

- Neil Baldock – engineer
- Geoff Bisente – assistant engineer, engineer
- Stewart Cararas – producer, engineer, mixer (Tracks 2, 4, 5, 6, 7, 13, 14), additional engineering/production (Tracks 1, 8, 12,)
- Billy Ray Cyrus – engineer, producer
- Billy Decker – mixing
- Jim DeMain – mastering
- Brandon Friesen – engineer, mixing, producer, programming
- Noah Gordon – editing, producer
- Ben Grafton – assistant engineer
- Casey Henderson – assistant engineer
- Derek Jones – assistant engineer
- Shim Kratky – assistant engineer
- Jason Charles Miller – producer (Tracks 2, 4, 5, 6, 7, 13, 14), additional engineering/production (Tracks 1, 8, 12,)
- Jimmy Plann – drum programming, engineer
- Andrew Rollins – producer

== Charts ==
Chart (2016–18)	Peak position
Australian Albums (ARIA)	20
Australian Country Albums (ARIA)	4
US Top Country Albums (Billboard)	49
