= Time Flies (Billy Ray Cyrus album) =

Studio album by Billy Ray Cyrus
- Released: June 10, 2003
- Recorded: 2002
- Genre: Country
- Length: 57:00
- Label: Madacy Entertainment
- Producer: Jeff Tweel

Billy Ray Cyrus chronology
Southern Rain (2000)	Time Flies (2003)	The Other Side (2003)

Singles from Time Flies
- 1. "What Else Is There" Released: 2002; 2. "Back to Memphis" Released: May 2003

Professional ratings
Review scores
Source	Rating
About.com	3/5 stars
The Daily Vault	C− link

Time Flies is the seventh studio album by country music artist Billy Ray Cyrus. Originally planned for a June 2002 release, it was delayed several times until that November, when it received a limited release through PAX-TV and QVC. It was re-released by Madacy in June 2003. Two singles were released from the album - "What Else Is There" and "Back to Memphis".

== Content ==
Cyrus said of the album, "It reflected a lot of that dark period for me of being stranded in Toronto, then September 11th happening and then the War and everything else in the world breaking out so a lot of the songs that I wrote I was absolutely living you know."

Included on the album is an acoustic rendition of the title track to Cyrus's 1992 debut album Some Gave All.

"She Don't Love Me (She Don't Hate Me)" was later recorded by Trent Willmon on his 2004 self-titled debut album, and by Blake Shelton on his 2007 album Pure BS. Both of these versions were titled "She Don't Love Me".

"Stand Still" was used as the theme song for the TV show Doc. It references advice that Cyrus's dad gave him as a child. Cyrus said he wrote the song while he was "sitting on an airplane waiting to take off" around the time of filming Doc's pilot episode.

The album's title track, "Nobody", and the acoustic rendition of "Some Gave All" were all featured on episodes of Doc. The Sarasota Herald Tribune reported that "Nobody" was inspired by "a homeless girl Cyrus befriended" in Toronto while filming Doc. Cyrus said, "While shooting the first two episodes of Doc I lived near an old church where a lot of homeless people gathered, and my wife Tish and I got acquainted with a teenage homeless girl. Later on, there were several homeless murders and I spent weeks looking in shelters for this nameless girl. I never found her and told Tish, 'How can I help her if I don't know her name? Does that make her nobody?' That night I woke up singing the song."

The track "Close to Gone" was inspired by the events of September 11, 2001.

"Back to Memphis" was released as a single; originally planned for a March 2003 release, Cyrus said in April that it would instead be released "around the first week of May" and said, "I cut that song last summer with my own money, because I loved it so much."

== Release ==
Billboard reported in March 2002 that Time Flies was scheduled to be released that June as Cyrus's second album by Monument Records. On June 29 of that year, Cyrus began his 45-city Time Flies Tour in promotion of the album. Herald & Review reported in July that the album had been rescheduled for a later release to occur sometime "in the next few months." An August 2002 release date was then reported by multiple publications, before The Morning Journal reported that the album would instead be released that September. The Milwaukee Journal Sentinel then reported in October that the album had been delayed again and would be released that Fall "at a still- undetermined date."

Cyrus later explained to Great American Country that Time Flies had been delayed after Monument Records settled a lawsuit with The Dixie Chicks and said, "I worked so hard on Time Flies...I felt sorry for that record, I felt sorry for myself too. I put a whole lot of love and labor into that thing... And it hurt that my album took a back seat to everything else Sony had going on."

In December 2002, Billboard reported that Time Flies had been released by Sony Music Nashville and Sony Music Special Projects in collaboration with the television networks PAX, which was then-airing Cyrus's TV series Doc, and Global QVC Solutions. The album was reported to have gone "on sale Nov. 26 exclusively at the PAX website...and via a toll-free number being touted in promos running during Doc and other PAX programming."

By February 2003, Cyrus had left Monument Records, and in April of that year, he told the Pittsburgh Post-Gazette that Time Flies failed to receive a proper release, saying, "That whole album never really got to come out." Describing the album as one that "hasn't been available in stores" and "has been available only from the PAX cable network", The Mobile Register reported in early 2003 that Time Flies could potentially receive a "more widespread release" if "Back to Memphis" performed well as a single. Later that year, it was reported by Goldmine that Time Flies would be released on June 10, 2003 by Madacy Entertainment. Cyrus went on tour throughout the summer of 2003 to promote the album.

According to Great American Country, Time Flies was "pre-released" by Madacy on June 10, 2003 ahead of its "full release" during the "July 4th weekend." The album then had a "showcase" on Great American Country from July 14 through July 18.

== Track listing ==
#	Title	Length	Writer(s)
1.	"What Else Is There"	3:46	Steve Bogard, Rick Giles
2.	"Bread Alone"	3:42	Walt Aldridge
3.	"The Way It Is"	3:54	Kelly Garrett, Dale Dodson
4.	"She Don't Love Me (She Don't Hate Me)"	2:54	Casey Beathard, Jay Knowles
5.	"Time Flies"	3:59	Billy Ray Cyrus, Beathard
6.	"I Luv Ya"	2:38	John Hobbs, Jeffrey Steele, Michael Dulaney
7.	"I Still Believe"	3:37	Bill Decker, Jon Christopher Davis
8.	"Without You"	3:08	Victoria Shaw, Bill Deasy
9.	"Hard to Leave"	4:48	Derek McGrath, B. R. Cyrus
10.	"Nobody"	3:00	B. R. Cyrus
11.	"Tell Me"	4:39	B. R. Cyrus, Beathard
12.	"Close to Gone"	3:15	B. R. Cyrus, Kenny Greenberg, David Grissom
13.	"Stand Still"	4:35	B. R. Cyrus
14.	"Back to Memphis"	4:02	Rusty Tabor, T. W. Hale
15.	"Some Gave All" (Acoustic version)	4:17	B. R. Cyrus, C. Cyrus

== Charts ==
=== Album ===
Chart (2003)	Peak position
U.S. Billboard Top Country Albums	56

=== Singles ===
Year	Single	Peak positions
Year	Single	US Country
2002	"What Else Is There"	—
2003	"Back to Memphis"	60
"—" denotes releases that did not chart
