= Shot Full of Love =

Studio album by Billy Ray Cyrus
- Released: November 3, 1998
- Recorded: 1998
- Genre: Country
- Length: 41:26
- Label: Mercury
- Producer: John Kelton, Keith Stegall

Billy Ray Cyrus chronology
The Best of Billy Ray Cyrus: Cover to Cover (1997)	Shot Full of Love (1998)	Southern Rain (2000)

Singles from Shot Full of Love
- 1. "Time for Letting Go" Released: 1998; 2. "Busy Man" Released: 1998; 3. "Give My Heart to You" Released: 1999

Professional ratings
Review scores
Source	Rating
Allmusic	link
Entertainment Weekly	B−

Shot Full of Love is the fifth studio album by American country music artist Billy Ray Cyrus. It features the single "Busy Man", which peaked at number 3 in early 1999, becoming Cyrus's first Top Ten country hit since "Somebody New" in 1993. The album's title song is a cover of a song written by songwriter Bob McDill and originally recorded by Juice Newton in 1981, in 1983 by the Nitty Gritty Dirt Band, and a number 73-peaking single in 1990 for Jennifer McCarter and The McCarters. "Time for Letting Go" is a cover of the 1990 Jude Cole hit. "Missing You" was originally recorded by Canadian country music singer Calvin Wiggett in 1995. This was also Cyrus’s last studio album for the Mercury Records label. The album sold more than 220,000 copies worldwide. After that album's release, Billy Ray Cyrus left Mercury Records for Monument Records in 1999.

== Content ==
Great American Family profiled Shot Full of Love, describing it as Cyrus's "first collection of deliberately radio-ready tunes, the result of his first full-fledged sessions with the finest musicians on Music Row." Cyrus himself said of the album, "I adjusted my music, my attitude and my appearance. I let go of the past. I just felt that it was time to come back to earth. I decided, ‘I’m going to make a completely different album than I’ve ever made."

The album's title track is a cover of a song originally recorded by Juice Newton and popularized by the Nitty Gritty Dirt Band. The song was a staple of Cyrus's set list with his band Sly Dog in the 1980s, before he was signed to his first record deal.

== Track listing ==
#	Title	Length	Writer(s)
1.	"How's My World Treatin' You"	4:17	Jerry Laseter, Linda Buell, Kerry Kurt Phillips
2.	"Under the Hood"	2:50	Al Anderson, Bob DiPiero
3.	"Give My Heart to You"	3:49	Walt Aldridge, DiPiero
4.	"Busy Man"	3:17	Bob Regan, George Teren
5.	"Shot Full of Love" (Juice Newton cover)	4:24	Bob McDill
6.	"Rock This Planet"	2:32	Joe Collins, Michael White
7.	"Missing You" (Calvin Wiggett cover)	3:22	Rick Giles, Susan Longacre
8.	"Touchy Subject"	4:08	Michael Lunn, Gordon Bradberry
9.	"His Shoes"	4:00	Keith Stegall, Carson Chamberlain, Gary Harrison
10.	"Time for Letting Go" (Jude Cole cover)	4:14	Jude Cole
11.	"The American Dream"	4:33	Stegall, Harrison

== Chart performance ==
=== Albums ===
Chart (1998)	Peak position
Canadian Top Country Albums	9
U.S. Billboard Top Country Albums	32

=== Singles ===
Year	Single	Peak chart positions		
Year	Single	US Country	US	CAN Country
1998	"Time for Letting Go"	70	—	—
1998	"Busy Man"	3	46	5
1999	"Give My Heart to You"	41	—	63
"—" denotes releases that failed to chart

== Personnel ==
=== Main Musicians ===
- Billy Ray Cyrus - lead vocals, background vocals
- J. T. Corenflos - electric guitar
- Mark Douthit - saxophone
- Dan Dugmore - steel guitar
- Owen Hale - drums
- Jimmy Hall - background vocals
- Mike Henderson - electric guitar
- Dann Huff - electric guitar
- Paul Leim - drums
- Brent Mason - electric guitar
- Dave Pomeroy - bass guitar
- Gary Prim - keyboards
- John Wesley Ryles - background vocals
- Bruce Watkins - banjo
- Biff Watson - acoustic guitar
- John Willis - acoustic guitar
- Glenn Worf - bass guitar
