= Southern Rain =

Studio album by Billy Ray Cyrus
- Released: October 17, 2000
- Genre: Country
- Length: 44:54
- Label: Monument
- Producer: Billy Ray Cyrus; Blake Chancey; Dann Huff; Terry Shelton

Billy Ray Cyrus chronology
Shot Full of Love (1998)	Southern Rain (2000)	Time Flies (2003)

Singles from Southern Rain
- 1. "You Won't Be Lonely Now" Released: 2000; 2. "We the People" Released: 2000; 3. "Burn Down the Trailer Park" Released: 2001; 4. "Crazy 'Bout You Baby" Released: 2001; 5. "Southern Rain" Released: 2001

Southern Rain is the sixth studio album by American country music artist Billy Ray Cyrus released October 17, 2000. The album sold 14,000 copies in its first week of release and would go on to sell over 160,000 copies. It produced five singles on the Hot Country Songs charts, including the number 17 "You Won't Be Lonely Now". This was his first album for Monument Records after leaving Mercury Records in 1999.

== Content ==
Cyrus compared the title track on Southern Rain to the title tracks on his albums Some Gave All and Trail of Tears and said that he was inspired to write it in his backyard during a rainstorm while feeling "depressed" about leaving his previous record company. Cyrus co-wrote the song with Don Von Tress and Michael Joe Sagraves. The only other track on Southern Rain that Cyrus received a writing credit on is "Without You", which he co-wrote with Jude Cole. Cyrus began writing "Without You" on his own but described Cole as someone he had "always wanted to write with", and the two were connected through a Sony A&R representative.

The songs "You Won't Be Lonely Now", "All I'm Thinking About Is You", and "Everywhere I Wanna Be" were brought to Cyrus by producer Dann Huff. "I Will" was brought to Cyrus by producer Blake Chancey, and "Crazy 'Bout You Baby" was brought to Cyrus by a Sony representative. "You Won't Be Lonely Now" was written by Brett James and John Bettis. It was the first song recorded for Southern Rain by Cyrus and was also released as the album's lead single. "All I'm Thinking About Is You" was written by Jeffrey Steele, who also co-wrote "Crazy 'Bout You Baby" with Ed Berghoff. Cyrus considered the former track to be unique from anything he had recorded before, due to the spoken-word verses. He described the latter song as "kind of a retro rock country blues thing" and said, "It's got a fun little dancing groove and a great hook." "Everywhere I Want to Be" was written by Marty Dodson and Danny Wells, and Cyrus was drawn to the song by his love of power ballads. "I Will" was the last song chosen to be recorded for the album. Cyrus said, "I didn't get past the first verse and I knew I wanted to try to sing it. Everyone agreed that it was the perfect fit."

Monty Powell, who was a writer on two of Cyrus's previous singles, "Could've Been Me" and "Words By Heart", co-wrote Southern Rain's second single, "We the People", with Jimmie Lee Sloas and Anna Wilson. Noting that Southern Rain was released during an election year, Cyrus explained that he and his producers wanted "We the People" to be "an event record" and enlisted his personal friend Waylon Jennings, along with John Anderson, Danni Leigh, Montgomery Gentry, and Yankee Grey to join him on the track. Jennings and Anderson recite the Preamble of the United States Constitution during the song. George W. Bush's presidential campaign adopted "We the People" as an official theme song during the 2000 presidential election, after Monument Records offered use of the song to both Bush and the Al Gore presidential campaign. Cyrus was unsettled about the song's association with Bush, describing "We the People" as "a working people's song" and saying, "I've never really thought of the Republicans as the party of the working people." Cyrus's father, Ron Cyrus, a Democrat who served as a Kentucky state legislator, insisted that "We the People" is "a Democrat song."

Cyrus's manager introduced him to a demo of "Love You Back" while the two were en route to Savannah for Southern Rain's album cover photoshoot. Cyrus said of the track, "The song got my attention immediately and I played it all the time during the shoot. I loved the story and I like the R&B feel of the track."

A radio personality for WSIX-FM introduced Cyrus to "Burn Down the Trailer Park", which was written by Paul Thorn, Billy Maddox, and Pat McDonald. Cyrus said of the song, "It's got a feel of the Mississippi basin and the lyrics are really funny. It's been getting a great response in concert. Both men and women know exactly what it's talking about. It's got that special juju that makes people happy." Thorn later included his own version of the song on his 2001 album Aint Love Strange.

A cover of "Hey Elvis", originally recorded by Bryan Adams, who co-wrote the track with Gretchen Peters, is included on Southern Rain as a bonus track. "Hey Elvis" was first released as a bonus track on the Japanese version of Adams's 1996 album 18 til I Die. Cyrus had been wanting to cover "Hey Elvis" ever since Adams personally gave him a recording of the song in 1997 and was initially going to include it on his previous album Shot Full of Love. Cyrus produced his cover of the song with his guitar player Terry Shelton and said, "My band and I rented studio time and cut the song ourselves."

== Critical reception ==
Professional ratings
Review scores
Source	Rating
About.com	4.5/5 stars
AllMusic	2/5 stars
Billboard	(favorable) link
Entertainment Weekly	C+
People	(average)

A writer for About.com said, "Billy Ray fans will love this album, and those who may know Billy Ray only from "Achy Breaky Heart" should give him a chance to show that he's more than just a one-hit wonder. He's got a lot more to give, and he gives it here on Southern Rain." William Ruhlmann of AllMusic wrote that it was "a sturdy collection of average country songs effectively performed by a minor country talent. All of which was fine, unless you were hoping for an album that measured up to Cyrus' early sales figures, which, of course, Monument was." Alanna Nash of Entertainment Weekly said, "[I]f he gets nearly swallowed up in the power-pop ballads, he shines on the roots rockers — proof that underneath his lightweight, Chippendale reputation, there’s an artist dying to get out." A writer for People called the record "standard Cyrus, which means much of it sounds like the work of a frustrated heavy metal singer." The tracks "Hey Elvis", "We the People", "Love You Back" and "Burn Down the Trailer Park" were picked as highlights. Larry Wayne Clark of Music.com gave the album a positive review, calling it "among the better country albums yet released in the new millennium."

== Track listing ==
#	Title	Length	Writer(s)	Producer(s)
1.	"You Won't Be Lonely Now"	3:53	Brett James, John Bettis	Dann Huff
2.	"Southern Rain"	5:05	Billy Ray Cyrus, Michael Joe Sagraves, Don Von Tress	Dann Huff
3.	"All I'm Thinking About Is You"	3:42	Jeffrey Steele	Huff, Blake Chancey
4.	"We the People" (featuring John Anderson, Waylon Jennings, Danni Leigh, Montgomery Gentry, and Yankee Grey)	4:11	Monty Powell, Jimmie Lee Sloas, Anna Wilson	Huff, Blake Chancey
5.	"I Will"	3:58	Bonnie Baker, Carol Ann Brown	Huff, Blake Chancey
6.	"Love You Back"	3:56	Neil Thrasher, Wendell Mobley	Huff, Blake Chancey
7.	"Burn Down the Trailer Park"	3:18	Paul Thorn, Billy Maddox, Pat McDonald	Huff
8.	"Everywhere I Wanna Be"	3:28	Marty Dodson, Danny Wells	Huff
9.	"Crazy 'Bout You Baby"	3:20	Steele, Ed Berghoff	Huff, Chancey
10.	"Without You"	4:05	Cyrus, Jude Cole	Huff, Chancey
11.	"Hey Elvis" (bonus track)	5:58	Bryan Adams, Gretchen Peters	Cyrus, Terry Shelton

== Personnel ==
Adapted from Southern Rain liner notes.

Technical

- Jeff Balding - recording (all tracks except 11), mastering
- Blake Chancey - production (tracks 3–6, 9, 10 only)
- Billy Ray Cyrus - production (track 11 only)
- Dann Huff - production (all tracks except 11)
- Mike Janas - recording (track 11 only)
- Terry Shelton - production (track 11 only)

Musicians on all tracks except 11

- Tim Akers - keyboards
- Matt Basford - electric guitar on "We the People"
- Mike Brignardello - bass guitar
- Pat Buchanan - electric guitar, acoustic guitar (tracks 3–6, 9, 10 only)
- Joe Chemay - background vocals (tracks 3–6, 9, 10 only)
- Lisa Cochran - background vocals
- Eric Darken - percussion
- Paul Franklin - steel guitar
- Vicki Hampton - background vocals
- Dann Huff - electric guitar, acoustic guitar
- Gordon Kennedy - electric guitar, acoustic guitar
- Chris McHugh - drums
- Gene Miller - background vocals
- Steve Nathan - keyboards
- Michael Joe Sagraves - harmonica on "Southern Rain"

Musicians on Track 11

- Billy Ray Cyrus - background vocals
- Steve French - drums, background vocals
- Keith Hinton - electric guitar
- Corky Holbrook - bass guitar
- Michael Joe Sagraves - electric guitar
- Terry Shelton - acoustic guitar, electric guitar
- Barton Stevens - keyboards
- Don Von Tress - acoustic guitar

== Chart performance ==
=== Album ===
Chart (2000)	Peak position
Canadian Top Country Albums	24
US Billboard 200	102
US Top Country Albums (Billboard)	13

=== Singles ===
Year	Single	Peak chart positions	
Year	Single	US Country	US
2000	"You Won't Be Lonely Now"^{A}	17	80
2000	"We the People"	60	—
2001	"Burn Down the Trailer Park"	43	—
2001	"Crazy 'Bout You Baby"	58	—
2001	"Southern Rain"	45	—
"—" denotes releases that did not chart

- ^{A} "You Won't Be Lonely Now" reached #33 when RPM Country Tracks cessed production.
