= Nineteen (Billy Ray Cyrus song) =

Single by Billy Ray Cyrus

from the album I'm American
- Released: September 26, 2011
- Genre: Country
- Length: 3:18
- Label: Buena Vista Records
- Songwriters: Tom Hambridge, Jeffrey Steele, Gary Nicholson
- Producer: Buddy Cannon

Billy Ray Cyrus singles chronology
"Runway Lights" (2011)	"Nineteen" (2011)	"Change My Mind" (2012)

"Nineteen" is a song written by Tom Hambridge, Jeffrey Steele, and Gary Nicholson, which has been recorded by multiple American country music artists. The song was originally recorded by the duo Waycross. It was then recorded by singer Billy Ray Cyrus, on his album I'm American, which was released on June 28, 2011. Cyrus' version of the song was released as the album's second single on September 26, 2011.

== History ==
"Nineteen" was written by Tom Hambridge, Jeffrey Steele, and Gary Nicholson. The song is a ballad about a teenager who is a star in high school football, but after being inspired by the September 11 attacks, he turns down an athletic scholarship in favor of serving in the United States Marine Corps. He dies in combat and is referred to as "nineteen", the number of his football jersey, throughout.

The original version of the song was by Waycross, a duo from Nashville, Tennessee, consisting of Ted Moxley and Ben Stennis.

Taylor Hicks later recorded the song on his 2009 album The Distance, although his version of the song was not released as a single. Clayton Bellamy also recorded it on his 2012 album Everyone's a Dreamer.

== Critical reception ==
Billy Dukes of Taste of Country reviewed the Cyrus version favorably, as he considered the existence of other recordings prior to Cyrus's as proof that the song had appeal to country audiences. He also praised the "sincerity" of Cyrus's vocals.

== Chart performance ==
Waycross's rendition of "Nineteen" reached number 54 on Billboard Hot Country Songs in 2007, representing the duo's only single.

Cyrus's version of the song debuted at number 58 on the same chart for the week ending October 8, 2011. It was Cyrus' first chart entry since "A Good Day" peaked at number 59 on the country chart in September 2009.

=== Waycross ===
Chart (2007)	Peak position
US Country Songs (Billboard)	54

=== Billy Ray Cyrus ===
Chart (2011)	Peak position
US Hot Country Songs (Billboard)	58
