= Billy Ray Cyrus =

American country singer and actor (born 1961)

Colonel Billy Ray Cyrus
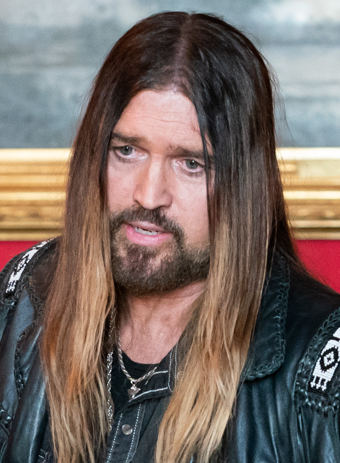
- Cyrus in 2019
- Born: William Ray Cyrus; August 25, 1961 (age 65); Flatwoods, Kentucky, U.S.
- Education: Georgetown College
- Occupations: Singer; songwriter; actor
- Years active: 1989–present
- Spouses: Cindy Smith (m. 1986; div. 1991); Tish Finley (m. 1993; div. 2023); Firerose (m. 2023; div. 2024)
- Partner: Elizabeth Hurley (2025–present)
- Children: 6, including Brandi, Trace, Miley, and Noah Cyrus
- Father: Ron Cyrus
- Awards: Full list
- Musical career
- Genres: Country; country pop
- Instruments: Vocals; guitar
- Labels: Mercury; Monument; Madacy; Word; Curb; Warner Bros.; New Door; UMe; Walt Disney; Lyric Street; Buena Vista; Broken Bow
- Formerly of: Brother Clyde
- Website: billyraycyrus.com

William Ray Cyrus (/ˈsaɪrəs/ SY-rəs; born August 25, 1961) is an American singer, songwriter and actor. Having released 16 studio albums and 53 singles since 1992, he is known for his hit single "Achy Breaky Heart", which topped the U.S. Hot Country Songs chart and became the first single ever to achieve triple platinum status in Australia. It was also the best-selling single in the same country in 1992. Due to the song's music video, the line dance rose in popularity.

A multi-platinum selling artist, Cyrus has scored a total of eight top-ten singles on the Billboard Hot Country Songs chart. His most successful album to date is his debut Some Gave All, which has been certified 9× multi-platinum in the United States and is the longest time spent by a debut artist and by a country artist at number one on the Billboard 200 (17 consecutive weeks) and most consecutive chart-topping weeks in the SoundScan era. Some Gave All was also the first debut album to enter at number one on the Billboard Top Country Albums chart. The album has also sold more than 20 million copies worldwide and is the best-selling debut album of all time for a solo male artist. Some Gave All was also the best-selling album of 1992 in the US with 4,832,000 copies. During his career he has released 36 charted singles, of which 17 charted in the top 40.

In 2019, Cyrus earned his first number-one single on the US Billboard Hot 100 as a featured artist on a remix of Lil Nas X's song "Old Town Road", which spent a record-breaking nineteen consecutive weeks at the top spot (eighteen of them credited to Cyrus). It also spent a record-breaking twenty consecutive weeks (nineteen of them credited to Cyrus) at the top spot on the Billboard Hot R&B/Hip-Hop Songs and Billboard Hot Rap Songs. The R&B/Hip-Hop record has been broken in May 2023 by SZA's "Kill Bill". Thanks to "Old Town Road", Cyrus won his first two Grammy Awards, in the categories Best Pop Duo/Group Performance and Best Music Video.

From 2001 to 2004, Cyrus starred on the television series Doc. The series focused on a country doctor who moved from Montana to New York City. From 2006 to 2011, he starred as Robby Ray Stewart on the Disney Channel series Hannah Montana with his daughter Miley Cyrus playing the title character. From 2016 to 2017, he starred as Vernon Brownmule on the CMT sitcom Still the King.

== Early life ==
Billy Ray Cyrus was born on August 25, 1961, in Flatwoods, Kentucky, to Ron Cyrus, a steelworker who became a politician, and his wife Ruth Ann (née Casto). Cyrus started singing at the age of four. His parents divorced in 1966. His grandfather was a Pentecostal preacher. Growing up he was surrounded by bluegrass and gospel music as his family are musicians. His right-handed father played guitar, however left-handed Cyrus tried to play his father's guitar, but could not. He attended Georgetown College on a baseball scholarship before changing to music. He dropped out of Georgetown during his junior year, realized he wanted to become a musician after attending a Neil Diamond concert, and set a 10-month goal to start a career. In the 1980s, he played in a band called Sly Dog, before signing a record contract with Mercury Nashville Records. Sly Dog was named after a one-eyed dog that Cyrus owned.

== Music career ==
=== 1990–2000: The Mercury Records years ===
While trying to get a recording contract in Los Angeles, Cyrus suffered many hardships including living in his neighbor's car. However, in 1990, he was signed to PolyGram/Mercury. In the same year he opened for Reba McEntire. Cyrus began to record and write music for his debut album, released in 1992.

Some Gave All was released in 1992. The album became an instant chart and sales success. It debuted at No. 1 on the Billboard Top Country Albums, Billboard 200, Canadian Country Albums chart, Canadian Albums Chart, and on the charts of several other countries. The album featured four consecutive top 40 singles on the Hot Country Songs chart from 1992 to 1993, including an album cut, the title track. The most successful single released was "Achy Breaky Heart". It reached No. 1 on the Hot Country Songs chart and was also a hit on the Billboard Hot 100, where it reached No. 4. Uniquely for a country music song it also became an international success, reaching number 1 in Australia and number 3 on the UK Singles Chart. Thanks to the video of this hit, there was the explosion of the line dance into the mainstream, becoming a global craze. Additionally, the singles "Could've Been Me" reached No. 2, "Wher'm I Gonna Live?" reached No. 23, and "She's Not Cryin' Anymore" reached No. 6. Some Gave All was certified 9× multi-platinum in the United States in 1996, and has sold over 20 million copies worldwide.

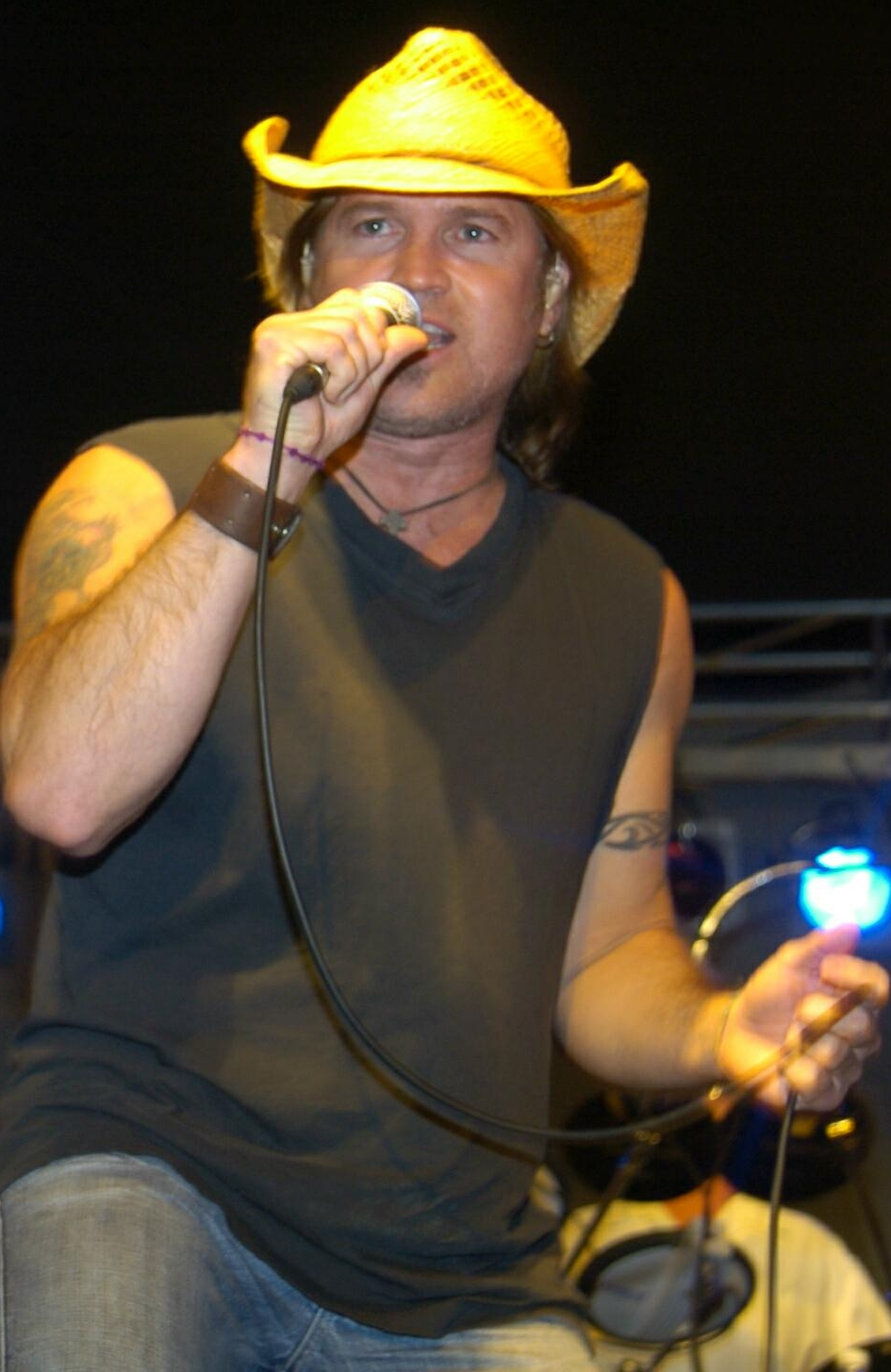
Cyrus singing at the Spirit of America tour, October 2005

In 1993, Cyrus and Mercury Records quickly released Cyrus' second studio album, It Won't Be the Last. The album featured four singles, three of which made the top 40. The album debuted at No. 1 on the Country charts, and No. 3 on the Billboard 200. By the end of the year, It Won't Be the Last was certified platinum by the RIAA. The highest-charting single, the lead-off single, "In the Heart of a Woman", charted to No. 3, with "Somebody New" charting to No. 9, "Words By Heart" at No. 12, and "Talk Some" at No. 63. Also in 1993, Cyrus appeared on Dolly Parton's single "Romeo"; though the single only reached 27 on the country singles charts, the accompanying video was popular on CMT.

Cyrus' third studio album, Storm in the Heartland, was released in 1994. It was the final album he recorded for PolyGram, which closed its doors in 1995. The album was not as successful as its predecessors. It only reached No. 11 on the Country albums chart, and only the title track made the top 40 of the Country singles chart. "Deja Blue" was the second single released; however, it only managed to chart to No. 66, and the third and final single, "One Last Thrill", failed to chart at all.

The album managed to be certified gold in the U.S. Before Cyrus started on his next album, he was transferred to Mercury Nashville.

Also in 1994, Cyrus contributed the song "Pictures Don't Lie" to the AIDS benefit album Red Hot + Country produced by the Red Hot Organization.

Cyrus' most critically acclaimed album was 1996's Trail of Tears for Mercury Records. The album debuted at No. 20 on the Country chart. Only two songs made the cut to radio, neither of which hit the top 40. The title track and "Three Little Words" reached No. 69 and No. 65 respectively. The album failed to reach any certification, and was off the charts after only four weeks.

In 1998, Cyrus released his last album for Mercury Records Shot Full of Love. The album became his lowest-peaking album, debuting at No. 32. The first single, "Under the Hood", failed to chart, "Time for Letting Go" hit No. 70, "Busy Man" charted No. 3, and "I Give My Heart to You" reached No. 41. After the single fell from the charts, Cyrus left Mercury and signed with Monument Records in 1999.

His debut album for Monument, Southern Rain, was released in 2000. It debuted at No. 13 on the Country albums chart and No. 102 on the Billboard 200. Five singles were released and all five charted. The lead-off single, "You Won't Be Lonely Now", was the highest-peaking single from the album, charting to No. 17. Other singles include "We the People" (No. 60), "Burn Down the Trailer Park" (No. 43), "Crazy 'Bout You Baby" (No. 58), and the title track (No. 45).

=== 2003: Shift to Christian music ===
After the singles from Southern Rain finished their chart runs, Cyrus recorded two Christian albums. Both albums, Time Flies and The Other Side, were released in 2003. The first album debuted and peaked at a low No. 56 on the Country album charts. Three singles were released; however, only the final single reached the charts. "Bread Alone", "What Else Is There", and "Back to Memphis" were released, and "Back to Memphis" charted to No. 60.

The second Christian album, The Other Side, was recorded while Cyrus filmed his PAX series, Doc. It debuted at No. 5 on the Top Christian Albums chart, No. 18 Top Country Albums, and No. 131 on Billboard 200. Two of three singles charted – "Face of God" (No. 54) and "The Other Side" (No. 45) – while "Always Sixteen" did not chart.

=== 2006: Disney Entertainment ===
The album Wanna Be Your Joe was Billy Ray's first country album since 2000's Southern Rain. It was again recorded on a new record label: New Door/UMe Records. It was released while Cyrus was filming the show Hannah Montana. Wanna Be Your Joe made it to No. 24 on the Country charts and No. 113 on the all-genre charts. The album initially sold well, but no hit-single was released. The title track was released as the first single, and was followed by "I Want My Mullet Back", both of which were ignored by country radio. Although not released as a single, a music video was made for the track "Stand", a duet with daughter Miley Cyrus.

Also in 2006, Billy Ray appeared with metal-rock group Metal Skool (now Steel Panther), and performed several songs including "Rebel Yell" by Billy Idol, and the song "I Want My Mullet Back", which appears on Wanna Be Your Joe.

He also sang "The Star Spangled Banner" at Game 5 of the 2006 World Series in St. Louis, Missouri.

=== 2007–08: Career re-launch ===
In mid-2007, Cyrus was a celebrity contestant on the 4th season of the show Dancing with the Stars. Cyrus was partnered with Karina Smirnoff. He quickly became a fan favorite. Cyrus and Smirnoff made it to the semi-finals, where they finished in 5th place.

From Cyrus's exposure on Dancing with the Stars and Hannah Montana, his record label pushed up the release date by a month for his new album. Home at Last was released in July 2007 on Walt Disney Records. It debuted at No. 3 on the country charts, making it Cyrus' first top 5 entry since 1993. Beginning sales for the album were very strong; however, the album failed to be certified. The single "Ready, Set, Don't Go", was initially released as a solo single. The solo version made it to No. 33 on the Hot Country Songs chart.

In October 2007, Cyrus and his daughter Miley performed a duet of the song on Dancing with the Stars. The duet debuted at No. 27 on the Country charts and eventually peaked at No. 4 in 2008, giving Billy Ray his first top 5 single since 1999, as well as Miley's first top 5 on any Billboard chart.

Cyrus was a part of the Disney collection Country Sings Disney in 2008. Two of his songs, "Ready, Set, Don't Go" and the Sheryl Crow-penned song "Real Gone", appeared on the album. Billy Ray's version of "Real Gone" was also made into a music video that is in rotation on both CMT and GAC; the song also appears on Back to Tennessee.

=== 2008–10: New label and newfound chart success ===
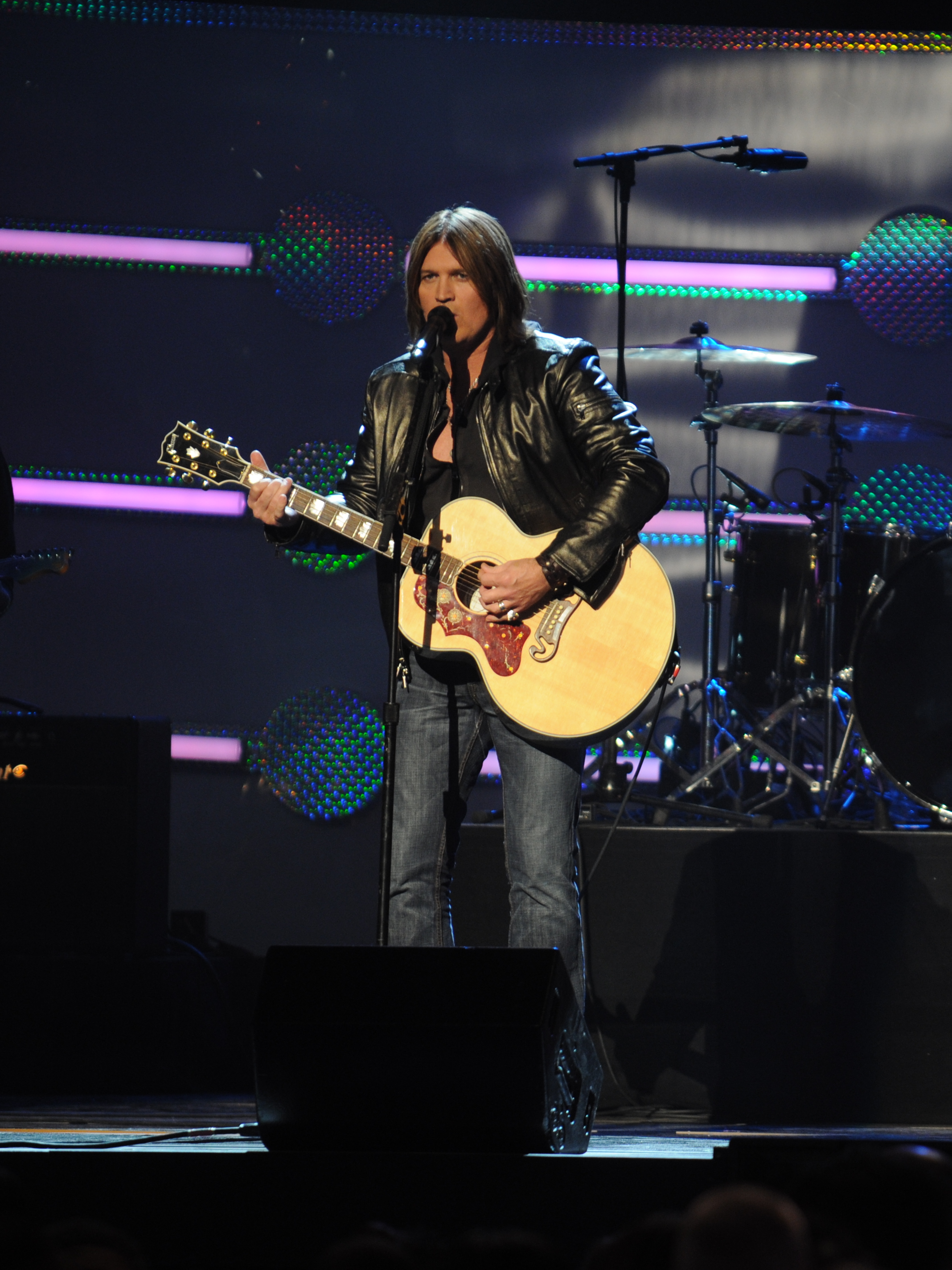
Cyrus singing at the Kids Inaugural Event in January 2009

In late 2008, his website announced that a new studio album would be released by the end of the year from Lyric Street Records, entitled Back to Tennessee. The album was originally planned to be released on October 21, 2008, but was pushed back to November 18. When the album was not released, it was announced for a January 13, 2009, release. The first single, "Somebody Said a Prayer", debuted at No. 53 in August 2008 and reached No. 33 in November of that year. On March 14, 2009, the album's title track debuted at No. 59 on the country singles chart and a month later on April 7, Back to Tennessee was released. The song only charted to No. 47 after 11 weeks. A third single, "A Good Day", debuted at No. 60 on the country charts for the chart week of September 5, 2009.

It was less successful in its first week out as Home at Last. It only reached No. 13 on the charts and only sold approximately 14,000 copies in its opening week. The album's release date coincided with the release of Hannah Montana: The Movie. The song "Back to Tennessee" was included on the movie's soundtrack, as well as a duet with Miley Cyrus, entitled "Butterfly Fly Away". The latter song would peak at No. 56 on the Billboard Hot 100 and at No. 50 and Canadian Hot 100.

On November 12, 2008, Billy Ray and Miley presented the "Song of the Year" award at the 42nd Annual Country Music Association Awards. Prior to the award show, both Billy Ray and Miley performed on Good Morning America. In December 2008, Cyrus made a cameo in Metro Station's video, "Seventeen Forever".

Shortly after the chart debut of Back to Tennessee's third single, "A Good Day", Cyrus and Lyric Street Records parted ways after only one album.

Cyrus, Phil Vassar, Jeffrey Steele, and John Waite formed a supergroup together in early 2009 called Brother Clyde. On Twitter Cyrus confirmed he was in a supergroup and said they had just cut the first single for their new album, Lately.

On June 30, 2010, Cyrus said about the new alternative rock group Brother Clyde that the old members would be substituted by Samantha Maloney, Jamie Miller, Dan Knight, and Dave Henning. Also, he said that their single, "Lately", was available on iTunes and that their debut album would be out on August 10, 2010.

=== 2010–19: Post-Brother Clyde, "Old Town Road" remix and popular resurgence ===
In late 2010, Cyrus suspended his activities in the band Brother Clyde, and announced the release of his new solo patriotic album, entitled I'm American. Initially scheduled to be released in November 2010, it was pushed back to a May 24, 2011, release with a re-recording of "Some Gave All" that featured guest vocals from Darryl Worley, Jamey Johnson and Craig Morgan being released as the lead-off single. However, in April 2011, the single was changed to "Runway Lights". I'm American was released on June 28, 2011. A second single, "Nineteen", was released in August 2011. The song entered the Hot Country Songs chart for the week of October 8, 2011, where it debuted at number 58, becoming Cyrus' first charted single since "A Good Day" in 2009.

Cyrus released the album Change My Mind on October 23, 2012. Its first single, the title track, was released on September 6.

In April 2017, Cyrus told Rolling Stone Country that on his birthday, August 25, he would be known as Cyrus, or "the artist formerly known as Billy Ray", after legally changing his name. Fans did not like this, but on Live with Kelly and Ryan Cyrus said "I'm here to set the record straight. That's the name of the album–'Cyrus'. Then, subtitled, 'Set the Record Straight.'" He assured fans his name would still be Billy Ray.

After Billboard removed American rapper Lil Nas X's country-rap song "Old Town Road" from their Country chart, Cyrus was featured in the remix. The remix rose to number one on the Billboard Hot 100, unseating the original mix of the song and giving Cyrus his first number one song on the Hot 100. "Old Town Road" spent 19 consecutive weeks (18 of those credited to Cyrus) on the Hot 100, breaking the record as the longest running number one song in history, surpassing the record that was previously set by Mariah Carey and Boyz II Men song "One Sweet Day". The song was nominated for various Grammy Awards, winning Best Pop Duo/Group Performance and Best Music Video. In October 2019, the song received a diamond certification by the RIAA, selling over ten million total units in the United States. It became the fastest song to be awarded diamond certification.

In 2026, Cyrus competed in season fourteen of The Masked Singer as "Owl". He was eliminated on "Twilight Night".

== Acting career ==
Cyrus starred in the 1999 independent film Radical Jack. He also had a small part in David Lynch's 2001 film Mulholland Drive as Gene, a pool cleaner who had been having an affair with the wife of Adam Kesher (Justin Theroux). In 2001, Cyrus played the lead role on the PAX (now ION Television) comedy-drama Doc, which became the network's highest-rated show. In 2005, Cyrus expanded his acting career in a stage production of Annie Get Your Gun in Toronto, appearing in the role of Frank Butler.

Cyrus' television credits include The Nanny, Diagnosis Murder, Love Boat, The Next Wave, and TNN's 18 Wheels Of Justice. In 2004, he guest-starred as a limo driver in the episode "The Power of Love" of the Canadian teen drama Degrassi: The Next Generation. Cyrus has also been the subject of many television specials that detail his rise to fame and his career. These include two ABC documentaries, Billy Ray Cyrus: Dreams Come True and Billy Ray Cyrus: A Year on the Road, a VH1 exclusive, as well as the TNN specials I Give My Heart To You, and The Life and Times of Billy Ray Cyrus. In late 2005, Cyrus and his daughter Miley Cyrus began co-starring in the Disney Channel original television series, Hannah Montana, which premiered on March 24, 2006.

In March 2007, Cyrus joined several other celebrities to take part in the fourth season of the US version of Dancing with the Stars. He and his partner Karina Smirnoff, were eliminated in the eighth week (May 8, 2007) after having also placed in the "bottom two" the week before.

Cyrus also starred in Jackie Chan's film The Spy Next Door. It was shot in Albuquerque, New Mexico and released in January 2010.

Cyrus sits on the advisory board of a conservative group called the Parents Television Council.

In 2010, it was announced that Cyrus and his son Trace Cyrus would take part in a new Syfy reality series called UFO: Unbelievably Freakin' Obvious.

Cyrus made his Broadway debut as Billy Flynn in Chicago. He was in the show for a temporary engagement from November 5 to December 23, 2012.

== Personal life ==
=== Relationships and family ===
Cyrus was married to Cindy Smith from 1986 until they divorced in 1991. Cyrus and Smith co-wrote the songs "Wher'm I Gonna Live?" and "Some Gave All", both of which were featured on Cyrus' 1992 debut album Some Gave All.

In 1992, Cyrus became the father of two children with different women: a son, Christopher Cody Cyrus, born to waitress Kristin Luckey, and a daughter, Miley Ray Cyrus, born to Leticia "Tish" Finley. Cyrus pledged to Luckey to support her and their child; she raised their son in South Carolina.

On December 28, 1993, while Finley was pregnant with their second child, the couple were secretly married against the advice of Cyrus' record company. They have three children together, two daughters: Miley Ray Cyrus (born Destiny Hope Cyrus; in 1992) and Noah Lindsey Cyrus (born 2000); and a son, Braison Chance Cyrus (born 1994). He also adopted the two children Finley brought from her previous relationship: daughter Brandi Glenn Cyrus (born 1987), and son Trace Dempsey Cyrus (born Neil Timothy Helson; in 1989). In June 2021, Cyrus became a grandfather for the first time when his son Braison and daughter-in-law Stella (née McBride) Cyrus welcomed their first child.

The family lived on a 500-acre (2.0 km^{2}) farm in Thompson's Station, Tennessee, near Nashville. They moved to Los Angeles for the filming of the Disney Channel original series Hannah Montana in which daughter Miley starred. Brandi also had cameos in the series, in the episodes "Yet Another Side of Me" and "Been Here All Along".

On October 26, 2010, Cyrus filed for divorce in Tennessee, citing irreconcilable differences but in March 2011, Cyrus said he had dropped the divorce proceedings.

On June 13, 2013, Tish filed for divorce after 19 years of marriage, citing irreconcilable differences with Cyrus. In July 2013, the couple was reported to be in therapy and dropped the divorce. In 2017, the second divorce case was officially dismissed by the court since the couple failed to appear. In April 2022, Tish filed for divorce a second time, with the divorce papers revealing that they had been separated for more than two years.

In August 2022, Cyrus became engaged to Australian singer Firerose. The two met over a decade prior on the set of Hannah Montana and in 2021 released "New Day", a collaboration featuring Firerose's vocals and Cyrus on guitar. They were married on October 10, 2023.

On May 22, 2024, Cyrus filed for divorce from Firerose. The couple cited irreconcilable differences as well as inappropriate marital conduct as the reason for the divorce. Cyrus also asked the court to grant him an outright annulment, claiming the marriage was obtained by fraud. On August 5, 2024, the divorce was finalized.

In April 2025, actress and model Elizabeth Hurley revealed on social media that she and Cyrus were now dating.

=== Political views ===
Although Cyrus's song "We the People" was used as a campaign song by Republican George W. Bush in his 2000 presidential campaign, Cyrus was reported as saying that he had been a lifelong Democrat. He attended a fundraiser for Al Gore that year.

In August 2024, Cyrus shared a photo on Instagram showing him next to Republican then-former president Donald Trump, offering his endorsement to him in the 2024 presidential election. On January 20, 2025, he performed at the presidential inaugural ball, which celebrated the commencement of Trump's second term.

=== Awards ===
Cyrus is a Kentucky Colonel, awarded by the governor of Kentucky.

== Discography ==
Studio albums

- Some Gave All (1992)
- It Won't Be the Last (1993)
- Storm in the Heartland (1994)
- Trail of Tears (1996)
- Shot Full of Love (1998)
- Southern Rain (2000)
- Time Flies (2003)
- The Other Side (2003)
- Wanna Be Your Joe (2006)
- Home at Last (2007)
- Back to Tennessee (2009)
- I'm American (2011)
- Change My Mind (2012)
- Thin Line (2016)
- Set the Record Straight (2017)
- The SnakeDoctor Circus (2019)

== Filmography ==
=== Film ===
Year	Title	Role	Notes
2001	Radical Jack	Jack	
2001	Mulholland Drive	Gene	
2002	Wish You Were Dead	Dean Longo	
2004	Death and Texas	Spoade Perkins	
2004	Elvis Has Left the Building	Hank	Uncredited
2008	Bait Shop	Hot Rod Johnson	
2008	Best of Both Worlds Concert	Himself	
2009	Flying By	George Barron	
2009	Christmas in Canaan	Daniel Burton	Television film
2009	Hannah Montana: The Movie	Robby Ray Stewart	Golden Raspberry Award for Worst Supporting Actor
2010	The Spy Next Door	Colton James	Nominated—Golden Raspberry Award for Worst Supporting Actor
2011	Billy Ray Cyrus: I'm American	Himself	Television film
2011	Christmas Comes Home to Canaan	Daniel Burton	Television film
2014	Like a Country Song	Bo Reeson	
2014	Sharknado 2: The Second One	Doctor Quint	
2017	Demi Lovato: Simply Complicated	Himself	Documentary film
2020	American Reject		
2022	Christmas in Paradise	Jimmy Love	
2023	Glisten and the Merry Mission	Donner	Voice

=== Television ===
Year	Title	Role	Notes
1992	Top of the Pops	Himself	3 episodes
1995	The Nanny	Himself	Episode: "A Kiss Is Just a Kiss"
1997	Diagnosis: Murder	Himself	Episode: "Murder, Country Style"
1999	The Love Boat: The Next Wave	Lasso Larry Larsen	Episode: "Divorce, Downbeat and Distemper"
2000	18 Wheels of Justice	Henry Conners	Episode: "Games of Chance"
2001–2004	Doc	Dr. Clint Cassidy	88 episodes
2002	Sue Thomas: F.B.Eye	Dr. Clint Cassidy	Episode: "Pilot"
2003	Degrassi: The Next Generation	Limo driver, Duke	Episode: "The Power of Love"
2006–2011	Hannah Montana	Robby Ray Stewart	95 episodes Teen Choice Award for Choice TV Parental Unit
2007	Billy Ray Cyrus: Home at Last	Himself	4 episodes
2007	Dancing with the Stars	Himself, contestant	17 episodes
2008	Hillbilly: The Real Story	Host	Episode: "Hillbilly: The Real Story"
2008	Nashville Star	Host	9 episodes
2008	Phineas and Ferb	Buck Buckerson (Voice)	Episode: "It's a Mud, Mud, Mud, Mud World"
2010	Are We There Yet?	Luke Bonnie	Episode: "The Hand on a House"
2011	Full Throttle Saloon	Himself	Episode: "Episode 2.3"
2011	Surprise Homecoming	Host	8 episodes
2011–2012	90210	Judd Ridge	2 episodes
2014	The Haunting Of...	Himself	Episode: "Billy Ray Cyrus"
2014	Newsreaders	Billy Ray Cyrus	Episode: "America's Unknown President; Reporter on House Arrest"
2016–2017	Still the King	Vernon Brownmule	26 episodes
2017	Cyrus vs. Cyrus: Design and Conquer	Himself	Episode: "Creating a Forever Home"
2017	Blaze and the Monster Machines	Lazard (Voice)	Episode: "Animal Island"
2017	Carpool Karaoke: The Series	Himself	Episode: "The Cyrus Family"
2026	The Masked Singer	Himself/Owl	Season 14 Contestant; 3 episodes
2026	Hannah Montana 20th Anniversary Special	Himself	TV Special

Producer
Year	Title	Notes
2009	Hannah Montana: The Movie	
2011	Surprise Homecoming	8 episodes
2016–2017	Still the King	26 episodes

== See also ==
- List of awards and nominations received by Billy Ray Cyrus
- List of best-selling albums in the United States
- List of country music performers
- List of number-one hits (United States)

Awards and achievements
Preceded by Jerry Springer & Kym Johnson	Dancing with the Stars (US) quarter-finalist Season 4 (Spring 2007 with Karina Smirnoff)	Succeeded by Cameron Mathison & Edyta Sliwinska
