= Set the Record Straight (Billy Ray Cyrus album) =

Studio album by Billy Ray Cyrus
- Released: November 10, 2017
- Genre: Country
- Length: 65:59
- Label: Flatwood Records

Billy Ray Cyrus chronology
| Thin Line (2016) | Set the Record Straight (2017) | The SnakeDoctor Circus (2019) |

Singles from Thin Line
- 1. "Achy Breaky Heart 25" Released: April 28, 2017

Set the Record Straight is the fifteenth studio album by country singer Billy Ray Cyrus, and his first on record label Flatwoods Records. It was released on November 10, 2017. The album peaked at number 43 on the Billboard Independent Albums Charts.

== Track listing ==
| No. | Title | Length |
|---|---|---|
| 1. | "I Wanna be Your Joe" | 3:14 |
| 2. | "Tulsa Time (ROKMAN Remix) (featuring Noah Cyrus and Derek Jones)" | 2:59 |
| 3. | "You Good" | 4:26 |
| 4. | "Folsom Prison Blues" | 5:14 |
| 5. | "Country Music Has the Blues (featuring George Jones and Loretta Lynn)" | 2:26 |
| 6. | "I Want My Mullet Back" | 3:18 |
| 7. | "Achy Breaky Heart 25th (Muscle Shoals Mix) (featuring Ronnie Milsap)" | 4:14 |
| 8. | "I Wouldn't Be Me" | 4:11 |
| 9. | "Stand" | 4:19 |
| 10. | "Hey Daddy" | 3:45 |
| 11. | "The Freebird Fell" | 4:59 |
| 12. | "Trail of Tears" | 3:28 |
| 13. | "Achy Breaky Heart 25 (Spanglish) (featuring Jencarlos Canela)" | 3:14 |
| 14. | "Meant to Be" | 5:04 |
| 15. | "Achy Breaky Heart (Remix) (featuring DJKO)" | 3:27 |
| 16. | "Worry" | 4:27 |
| Total length: | | 62:15 |

== Charts ==
| Chart (2017) | Peak position |
|---|---|
| US Independent Albums (Billboard) | 43 |

== Release history ==
List of regions, release dates, formats, labels and references
| Region | Date | Formats | Label | Ref. |
|---|---|---|---|---|
| United States | November 10, 2017 | CD; digital download; streaming | Flatwood Records | |
