= The Other Side (Billy Ray Cyrus album) =

Studio album by Billy Ray Cyrus
- Released: October 28, 2003
- Recorded: 2002
- Studio: Emerald Entertainment and Our Place Studio (Nashville, Tennessee); Paragon Studios (Franklin, Tennessee)
- Genre: Country, Christian
- Length: 43:00
- Label: Word
- Producer: Billy Joe Walker, Jr.

Billy Ray Cyrus chronology
Time Flies (2003)	The Other Side (2003)	20th Century Masters - The Millennium Collection (2003)

Professional ratings
Review scores
Source	Rating
= Allmusic	link

The Other Side is the eighth studio album by country singer Billy Ray Cyrus. It is also the only album he recorded for the Word Records label. Three singles were released from the album, "Always Sixteen", "Face of God", and "I Need You Now". "Face of God" peaked at number 54 on the Hot Country Songs chart.

== Track listing ==
1. "Face of God" (Bob DiPiero, Tom Shapiro, Rivers Rutherford) - 3:47
2. "Wouldn't You Do This for Me?" (Kelly Shiver, Rusty Tabor) - 3:34
3. "Always Sixteen" (Marty Dodson, Brett James) - 3:32
4. "I Need You Now" (Shiver) - 4:05
5. "Love Has No Walls" (Sam Mizell, Matthew West) - 3:41
6. "Tip of My Heart" (Bebo Norman) - 4:21
7. "Did I Forget to Pray" (Del Gray, Bobby Taylor) - 3:09
8. "Holding On to a Dream" (Richard Marx, Richie McDonald, Victoria Shaw) - 3:23
9. "I Love You This Much" (Austin Cunningham, Neil Thrasher) - 3:26
10. "The Other Side" (Billy Ray Cyrus) - 3:58
11. "Amazing Grace" (John Newton, arr. by Cyrus and Billy Joe Walker Jr.) - 5:48

== Personnel ==
Musicians and vocalists

- Billy Ray Cyrus – lead vocals, backing vocals
- John Barlow Jarvis – acoustic piano, Hammond B3 organ
- Gordon Mote – Hammond B3 organ, synthesizers, strings
- Pat Buchanan – electric guitar
- Dan Dugmore – electric slide guitar
- B. James Lowry – acoustic guitar
- Brent Mason – electric guitar
- Terry Shelton – acoustic guitar
- Billy Joe Walker Jr. – electric guitar, gut-string guitar
- Kevin Haynie – banjo
- Dave Pomeroy – bass
- Michael Rhodes – bass
- Glenn Worf – bass
- Paul Leim – drums, tambourine
- Greg Morrow – drums
- Lonnie Wilson – drums
- Jonathan Yudkin – fiddle
- Bekka Bramlett – backing vocals
- Kim Carnes – backing vocals
- Wendi Foy Green– backing vocals
- Richard Marx – backing vocals
- Gene Miller – backing vocals
- Kim Parent – backing vocals
- Joe Scaife – backing vocals
- Chance Scoggins – backing vocals
- Harry Stinson – backing vocals
- Neil Thrasher – backing vocals
- Ray Walker – backing vocals
- Denise Walls – backing vocals
- Curtis Young – backing vocals

Production and technical

- Shawn McSpadden – A&R direction
- Billy Joe Walker Jr. – producer
- Steve Tillisch – recording (1–10), mixing (8)
- Ed Seay – mixing (1–7, 9–11)
- John Jaszcz – recording (11)
- Jason Lefan – recording assistant (1–10), mix assistant (1–7, 9–11)
- Sean Neff – mix assistant (1–7, 9–11)
- L. Grant Greene – recording assistant (11)
- Benny Quinn – mastering at Masterfonics (Nashville, Tennessee)
- Katherine Petillo – art direction
- Sally Carns – design
- Erick Anderson – photography

== Chart performance ==
=== Album ===
Chart (2003)	Peak position
U.S. Billboard 200	131
U.S. Billboard Top Christian Albums	5
U.S. Billboard Top Country Albums	18

=== Singles ===
Year	Single	Peak positions
Year	Single	US Country
2003	"Always Sixteen"	—
2004	"Face of God"	54
2004	"I Need You Now"	—
"—" denotes releases that did not chart
