= Billboard Comprehensive Albums =

Defunct albums chart by Billboard

Billboard Comprehensive Albums was established in 2003 and was a weekly albums chart produced by Billboard magazine that ranked the biggest selling albums in the United States regardless of the product's age or method of sales.

Billboard Comprehensive Albums included any album, old or new, sold anywhere, for which sales data was available. Generally, the Billboard Comprehensive Albums was nearly identical to the Billboard 200, with the exception of approximately 20 to 30 "catalog" albums that still sell well enough to be one of the top 200-selling albums in any given week.

Albums which are over 18 months old (from the date of release) and have dropped below position 100 on The Billboard 200 were removed from that chart and placed on the Top Pop Catalog Albums chart.

Until November 2007, albums sold as an "exclusive" to a particular retail outlet (such as iTunes, Starbucks, or Wal-Mart) were not eligible for the Billboard 200 due to a long-standing policy. This policy was changed following the first-week success of The Eagles' album Long Road Out of Eden, sold exclusively at Wal-Mart and on the Eagles' website; the rule change took effect with the issue dated November 17, 2007.

The Billboard Comprehensive Albums chart was not published in the print edition of Billboard magazine. Instead, it could be viewed via paid subscription to Billboard's online service, Billboard.biz.

The issue dated July 11, 2009 was the first time any catalog album outsold the number-one album on the Billboard 200. Three of Michael Jackson's albums (Number Ones, The Essential Michael Jackson and Thriller) claimed positions 1-3 respectively on Top Pop Catalog Albums and Top Comprehensive Albums in the week following Jackson's death.

After the continued success of such catalog albums, Billboard Comprehensive Albums chart was discontinued in November 2009, and the Billboard 200 began to incorporate the catalog albums. Billboard then started the Top Current Albums chart with the old rules of the Billboard 200.
