= Busy Man =

Single by Billy Ray Cyrus

from the album Shot Full of Love
- B-side: "Touchy Subject"
- Released: August 25, 1998
- Genre: Country
- Length: 3:17
- Label: Mercury Nashville
- Songwriters: Bob Regan, George Teren
- Producers: Keith Stegall, John Kelton

Billy Ray Cyrus singles chronology
"Time for Letting Go" (1998)	"Busy Man" (1998)	"Give My Heart to You" (1999)

"Busy Man" is a song written by Bob Regan and George Teren, and recorded by American country music artist Billy Ray Cyrus. It was released in August 1998 as the second single from his album Shot Full of Love. The song reached a peak of number 3 on the U.S. country singles charts in early 1999, becoming his first Top 10 hit since "Somebody New" in 1993 and his last until "Ready, Set, Don't Go" in 2008.

== Critical reception ==
Deborah Evans Price, of Billboard magazine reviewed the song favorably, calling it a "lyric most everyone will relate to." She goes on to say that the production has an "easy, rootsy feel that works well with Cyrus' vocal performance. He sounds more self-assured and in control - the marks of an artist who has suffered the slings and arrows of countless critics and emerged with his artistic vision stronger and more focused despite the abuse." In 2002, Shelly Fabian of About.com ranked the song number 392 on her list of the Top 500 Country Music Songs.

== Chart performance ==
"Busy Man" debuted at number 68 on the U.S. Billboard Hot Country Singles & Tracks chart for the chart week of October 31, 1998. It entered the Top 40 of the charts at number 40 in its fifth chart week. The single spent 27 weeks on the chart, reaching number 3 on March 13, 1999; Cyrus' first Top 5 since "In the Heart of a Woman" also reached number 3 in 1993.

Chart (1998–1999)	Peak position
Canada Country Singles (RPM)	5
US Billboard Hot 100	46
US Hot Country Songs (Billboard)	3

=== Year-end charts ===
Chart (1999)	Position
Canada Country Tracks (RPM)	23
US Country Songs (Billboard)	23
