= Ready, Set, Don't Go =

Single by Billy Ray Cyrus and Miley Cyrus

from the album Home at Last
- Released: August 13, 2007
- Studio: Your Place or Mine (Glendale, CA)
- Genre: Country pop
- Length: 3:48
- Label: Walt Disney
- Songwriters: Billy Ray Cyrus; Casey Beathard
- Producer: Fred Mollin

Billy Ray Cyrus singles chronology
"I Want My Mullet Back" (2006)	"Ready, Set, Don't Go" (2007)	"Somebody Said a Prayer" (2008)

Miley Cyrus singles chronology
"Make Some Noise" (2007)	"Ready, Set, Don't Go" (2007)	"See You Again" (2007)

"Ready, Set, Don't Go" is a country song recorded by American singers Billy Ray Cyrus and his daughter, Miley Cyrus. It was released as the lead single from Home at Last, Billy Ray Cyrus' tenth studio album on August 13, 2007. The song has received different interpretations, although, in actuality, Cyrus wrote the song several years before its release when his middle daughter, Miley, moved to Los Angeles in order to pursue an acting career with an audition for the Disney Channel Original Series Hannah Montana. "Ready, Set, Don't Go" received critical praise, with reviewers complimenting its lyrical content. It also reached positive commercial responses for Cyrus, compared to his downfall in previous years. Peaking at number 37 on the Billboard Hot 100, it became Cyrus' first entry on the chart since "You Won't Be Lonely Now" (2000).

The song's accompanying music video was directed by Elliot Lester and features some of Cyrus's home movies; it received a CMT Music Award nomination at the 2008 CMT Music Awards. The song eventually became re-released as a duet with Miley. At the time of the single's release, she was 14 and enjoying the success of her debut album Hannah Montana 2: Meet Miley Cyrus. The duet version became Miley's debut in country music and received better commercial outcomes. It reached its highest international peak in the Billboard Hot 100 at number 37 and became Cyrus' first international chart entry since "Could've Been Me" (1992). Cyrus, with and without his daughter, performed the song at several venues, most notably Miley's first headlining concert tour, the Best of Both Worlds Tour.

== Background and reception ==
"Ready, Set, Don't Go" (2007)
A sample of Billy Ray Cyrus' "Ready, Set, Don't Go." The song features his pop star daughter Miley and is lyrically about her in the state of coming of age.

"Ready, Set, Don't Go" is a country pop song which merges some of Home at Last's adult contemporary style. It is set in common time with a ballad tempo of 76 beats per minute. The song is written in a key of D major. Cyrus' and Miley's vocals each span two octaves, from B_{2} to B_{4}. The verses use a chord progression of D-Bm7-G twice, followed by Em and A, while the chorus uses G-A-D twice followed by G-Bm-Em-A-D.

The song's lyrics were written by Cyrus and Casey Beathard. Cyrus discussed Home at Last in an interview with Calvin Gilbert of CMT News in which he said the song was about children growing up and moving on, from his own experience of moving his family to Los Angeles to help Miley with her acting and singing career.

Amazon's Tammy La Gorce commented, "Hannah fans will fall for 'Ready, Set, Don't Go,' a dad-to-daughter song that sweetly underscores the love in Cyrus' real-life heart." Jeffrey B. Remz of Country Standard Time wrote that the song "finds Cyrus in good form."

== Chart performance ==
=== Solo version ===
"Ready, Set, Don't Go" debuted at number 67 on Billboard's Hot Digital Songs Chart which led to an appearance on the Billboard Hot 100 for the week ending August 4, 2007. The solo version debuted and peaked at number 85 on the Billboard Hot 100. "Ready, Set, Don't Go" became Cyrus' first appearance on the Hot 100 since "You Won't Be Lonely Now" (2000), which peaked at number 80. It also peaked at number 47 on Hot Country Songs and number 58 on the canceled Pop 100 chart.

=== Duet version ===
The duet version of "Ready, Set, Don't Go" enjoyed much more commercial success than the original version due to Miley's popularity. It debuted at number 85 in the Billboard Hot 100 for the week ending October 27, 2007. On the week ending January 26, 2008, the song ascended to number 40 on the Hot 100, becoming Cyrus first top 40 hit since his debut single "Achy Breaky Heart" (1992), which peaked at number four. The song ultimately peaked at number 37 on the Hot 100 for the week ending February 16, 2008. It also peaked at number four on Hot Country Songs, Cyrus' first top 10 on the chart since "Busy Man" (1999) peaked at number three, and number 44 on Pop 100. In the Canadian Hot 100, the song debuted at number 94 for the week ending on November 24, 2006. For the week ending February 2, 2008, the song reached its peak on the chart, at number 47. It became Cyrus' first international chart entry since "Could've Been Me" (1992). The song was released to US country radio on October 10, 2007

== Music video ==
Cyrus singing while home movies regarding his daughter play in the background in the "Ready, Set, Don't Go" music video

"Ready, Set, Don't Go"'s music video was directed by Elliot Lester, and produced by Steve Gainer. The video begins with a close-up of Cyrus' hand playing an acoustic guitar. It then transitions to show Cyrus sitting on top of two black trunks in a dark, vacant room. He is wearing a lavender-colored shirt with a gray tee underneath, jeans, and cowboy boots. The music video for "Ready, Set, Don't Go!" features Cyrus playing the guitar in the foreground, with images of Miley in the background. The video also includes clips from episodes of "Hannah Montana." A variety of home movies are played while Cyrus sings, nodding his head and flipping his hair intensely. The images range from Miley's infant to teenage years. The scene ends with a video of Miley leaving in a yellow taxicab, shown in the background. The final scene has home video footage of Cyrus with Miley in 1993 as she takes her first steps and he says, "alright".

The video for "Ready, Set, Don't Go" was nominated for "Tearjerker Video of the Year" at the 2008 CMT Music Awards. However, it lost to Kellie Pickler's video for "I Wonder."

== Live performances ==
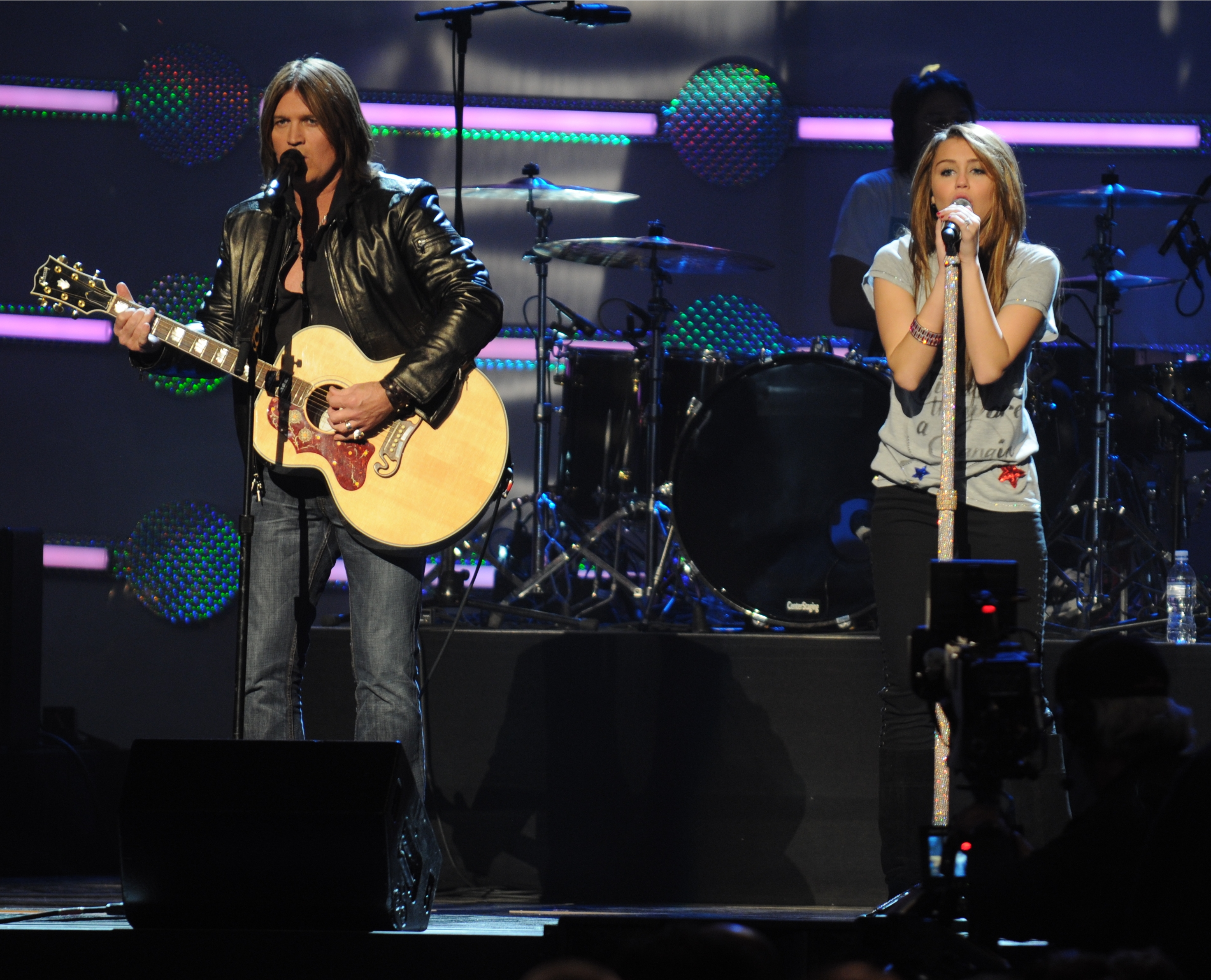
Cyrus and his daughter, Miley, performing "Ready, Set, Don't Go" at the Kids' Inaugural: "We Are the Future." - January 19, 2009; Washington, D.C.

Cyrus premiered "Ready, Set, Don't Go" on June 9, 2007 at the CMA Music Festival. Cyrus introduced the song as a duet on October 9 on Dancing with the Stars. Cyrus joined Miley on The Oprah Winfrey Show on December 20 to perform the song. "Ready, Set, Don't Go" was most notably performed on the Best of Both Worlds Tour. On selected dates, Cyrus and another one of his daughters, Brandi, joined Miley to perform the song as an encore. On April 14, 2008, "Ready, Set, Don't Go" was performed as duet at the CMT Music Awards. The performance begun with Cyrus, wearing an open white shirt with a brown tee underneath and jeans, playing an acoustic guitar that was strapped to him. By the line, "wherever they are", Miley, wearing a multicolored cocktail dress, joined him from the back of the stage.

On January 19, 2009, the song was performed at the Kids' Inaugural: "We Are the Future" event in celebration of Barack Obama's inauguration. Dressed in a graphic tee and jeans, Miley finished performing "See You Again" and asked Cyrus to join her onstage to perform the song. Cyrus was dressed in a black tee shirt, jeans, and a black leather jacket.

== Charts ==
=== Solo version ===
Chart (2007)	Peak position
US Billboard Hot 100	85
US Hot Country Songs (Billboard)	47

=== Duet version ===
Chart (2007–2008)	Peak position
Canada Hot 100 (Billboard)	47
US Billboard Hot 100	37
US Hot Country Songs (Billboard)	4

==== Year-end charts ====
Chart (2008)	Position
U.S. Hot Country Songs	37
