= Icon (Billy Ray Cyrus album) =

Compilation album by Billy Ray Cyrus
- Released: March 1, 2011
- Genre: Country
- Length: 44:45
- Label: Mercury Nashville
- Producer: Various original producers

Billy Ray Cyrus chronology
The Very Best of Billy Ray Cyrus (2009)	Icon (2011)	I'm American (2011)

Icon is an album released on March 1, 2011, from country music singer Billy Ray Cyrus. The album was released via Universal Music Group Nashville's Mercury Nashville division. The album features 12 songs that were featured on Cyrus' first three studio albums.

== Critical reception ==
Thom Jurek of AllMusic noted that the compilation only features songs from Cyrus' first three albums, as well as picking successful songs from his debut album, Some Gave All.

== Track listing ==
#	Title	Length	Songwriter(s)	Original album
1.	"Achy Breaky Heart"	3:25	Don Von Tress	Some Gave All
2.	"She's Not Cryin' Anymore"	3:27	Billy Ray Cyrus, Buddy Cannon, Terry Shelton	Some Gave All
3.	"Wher'm I Gonna Live?"	3:30	B. R. Cyrus, Cindy Cyrus	Some Gave All
4.	"In the Heart of a Woman"	4:01	Keith Hinton, Brett Cartwright	It Won't Be the Last
5.	"Three Little Words"	4:14	Wayne Perkins, Jimmy Collins	Trail of Tears
6.	"Could've Been Me"	3:46	Monty Powell, Reed Nielsen	Some Gave All
7.	"Storm in the Heartland"	3:54	Billy Henderson, Donal Burns, Curt Ryle	Storm in the Heartland
8.	"Somebody New"	3:46	Alex Harvey, Mike Curtis	It Won't Be the Last
9.	"Harper Valley P.T.A."	4:11	Tom T. Hall	Trail of Tears
10.	"Words By Heart"	3:07	Reed Nielsen, Monty Powell	It Won't Be the Last
11.	"Truth Is, I Lied"	3:19	B. R. Cyrus, Von Tress, Carl Perkins	Trail of Tears
12.	"Some Gave All"	4:05	B. R. Cyrus, C. Cyrus	Some Gave All
