= Love Songs (Billy Ray Cyrus album) =

Compilation album by Billy Ray Cyrus
- Released: January 29, 2008
- Genre: Country
- Length: 46:57
- Label: Mercury Nashville
- Producer: Various original producers

Billy Ray Cyrus chronology
Home at Last (2007)	Love Songs (2008)	Back to Tennessee (2009)

Love Songs is the first love songs compilation released on January 29, 2008 by country music singer Billy Ray Cyrus. The album was released on Mercury Nashville, Cyrus' first album with the label since leaving in 1998.

The album features love songs from Cyrus' studio albums he recorded with Mercury Records. Several of the tracks, however, were not radio singles, but album cuts. The track "Only God (Could Stop Me Loving You)" has been covered by several artists, including Emerson Drive. Their version of the song reached number 23 on the Hot Country Singles & Tracks chart in 2003. Also, the song "Somebody New" was covered by Jill King in 2008, her version of the song failed to chart.

== Reception ==
Professional ratings
Review scores
Source	Rating
allmusic	2.5/5 stars

Thom Jurek of allmusic gave the album 2.5 stars out of 5. He said "Isn't it awesome to have a Billy Ray Cyrus compilation without "Achy Breaky Heart" on it? Yes, and no. Yes, because some listeners need to hear that song again and again as long as they live, and no, because this collection of love songs doesn't really do much for the reborn Cyrus' reputation as a singer." However, he did go on to say that "She's Not Cryin' Anymore" was the best song originally on Some Gave All. He then went on and said that "Only God (Could Stop Me Loving You)" and "Missing You" were "flat and lifeless".

== Track listing ==
#	Title	Length	Songwriter(s)	Original album
1.	"She's Not Cryin' Anymore"	3:25	Billy Ray Cyrus, Buddy Cannon, Terry Shelton	Some Gave All
2.	"In the Heart of a Woman"	4:00	Keith Hinton, Brett Cartwright	It Won't Be the Last
3.	"I Am Here Now"	3:28	Cyrus, Michael Joe Sagraves, Shelton	Trail of Tears
4.	"Never Thought I'd Fall in Love with You"	3:41	Jim McKnight, Mike Murphy	Some Gave All
5.	"Only God (Could Stop Me Loving You)"	5:10	Robert John "Mutt" Lange	Storm in the Heartland
6.	"Missing You"	3:22	Rick Giles, Susan Logacre	Shot Full of Love
7.	"Three Little Words"	4:14	Wayne Perkins, Jimmy Collins	Trail of Tears
8.	"A Heart with Your Name on It"	2:44	Phillip Douglas, Brett Beavers	Storm in the Heartland
9.	"Somebody New"	3:45	Alex Harvey, Mike Curtis	It Won't Be the Last
10.	"Give My Heart to You"	3:49	Walt Aldridge, Bob DiPiero	Shot Full of Love
11.	"It Won't Be the Last"	3:49	Cyrus, Shelton	It Won't Be the Last
12.	"How Much"	5:30	Gregg Sutton, Danny Tate	Storm in the Heartland

== Chart performance ==
The album debuted and peaked at number 63 on Billboard's Top Country Albums chart, becoming Cyrus' lowest charting album on the chart.

Chart (2008)	Peak position
U.S. Billboard Top Country Albums	63
