= The Best of Billy Ray Cyrus: Cover to Cover =

Greatest hits album by Billy Ray Cyrus
- Released: June 24, 1997
- Genre: Country
- Length: 44:24
- Label: Mercury
- Producers: Various; new tracks produced by Keith Stegall and John Kelton

Billy Ray Cyrus chronology
Trail of Tears (1996)	The Best of Billy Ray Cyrus: Cover to Cover (1997)	Shot Full of Love (1998)

Singles from The Best of Billy Ray Cyrus: Cover to Cover
- 1. "It's All the Same to Me" Released: 1997

Professional ratings
Review scores
Source	Rating
Allmusic -	4/5 stars

The Best of Billy Ray Cyrus: Cover to Cover is a greatest hits album, released in 1997, by country music artist Billy Ray Cyrus. It features three newly released tracks — "It's All the Same to Me", "Cover to Cover", and "Bluegrass State of Mind" — as well as a reprise of "Trail of Tears" from his 1996 album of the same name. "It's All the Same to Me" was a Top 20 hit for Cyrus in 1997 on the Hot Country Songs charts.

== Track listing ==
#	Title	Length	Writer(s)
1.	"It's All the Same to Me"^{[A]}	4:25	Jerry Laseter, Kerry Kurt Phillips
2.	"Cover to Cover"^{[A]}	3:11	Gary Burr
3.	"Bluegrass State of Mind"^{[A]}	4:12	Mark Collie, Alex Harvey
4.	"Trail of Tears"	3:41	Billy Ray Cyrus
5.	"One Last Thrill"	3:38	Dave Loggins, Reed Nielsen
6.	"Storm in the Heartland"	3:53	Donal Burns, Billy Henderson, Curt Ryle
7.	"Words by Heart"	3:07	Nielsen, Monty Powell
8.	"Somebody New"	3:45	Mike Curtis, Harvey
9.	"In the Heart of a Woman"	4:00	Keith Hinton, Brett Cartwright
10.	"She's Not Cryin' Anymore"	3:25	Cyrus, Buddy Cannon, Terry Shelton
11.	"Could've Been Me"	3:44	Nielsen, Powell
12.	"Achy Breaky Heart"	3:23	Don Von Tress

- A New recording.

== Personnel ==
The following musicians played on the previously unreleased tracks.

- J. T. Corenflos – electric guitar
- Billy Ray Cyrus – lead vocals
- Stuart Duncan – fiddle
- Paul Leim – drums
- Brent Mason – electric guitar
- Dave Pomeroy – bass guitar
- Gary Prim – keyboards
- John Wesley Ryles – background vocals
- Biff Watson – acoustic guitar
- John D. Willis – acoustic guitar

=== Production ===
- Keith Stegall and John Kelton (tracks 1–3)
- Terry Shelton and Billy Ray Cyrus (track 4)
- Joe Scaife and Jim Cotton (tracks 5–12)

== Chart performance ==
=== Album ===
Year	Chart	Peak Position
1997	Top Country Albums	23
1997	Canadian Country Albums	11

=== Singles ===
Year	Single	Chart Positions	
Year	Single	US Country	CAN Country
1997	"It's All the Same to Me"	19	14
