= These Boots Are Made for Walkin' =

Song by Lee Hazlewood and Nancy Sinatra

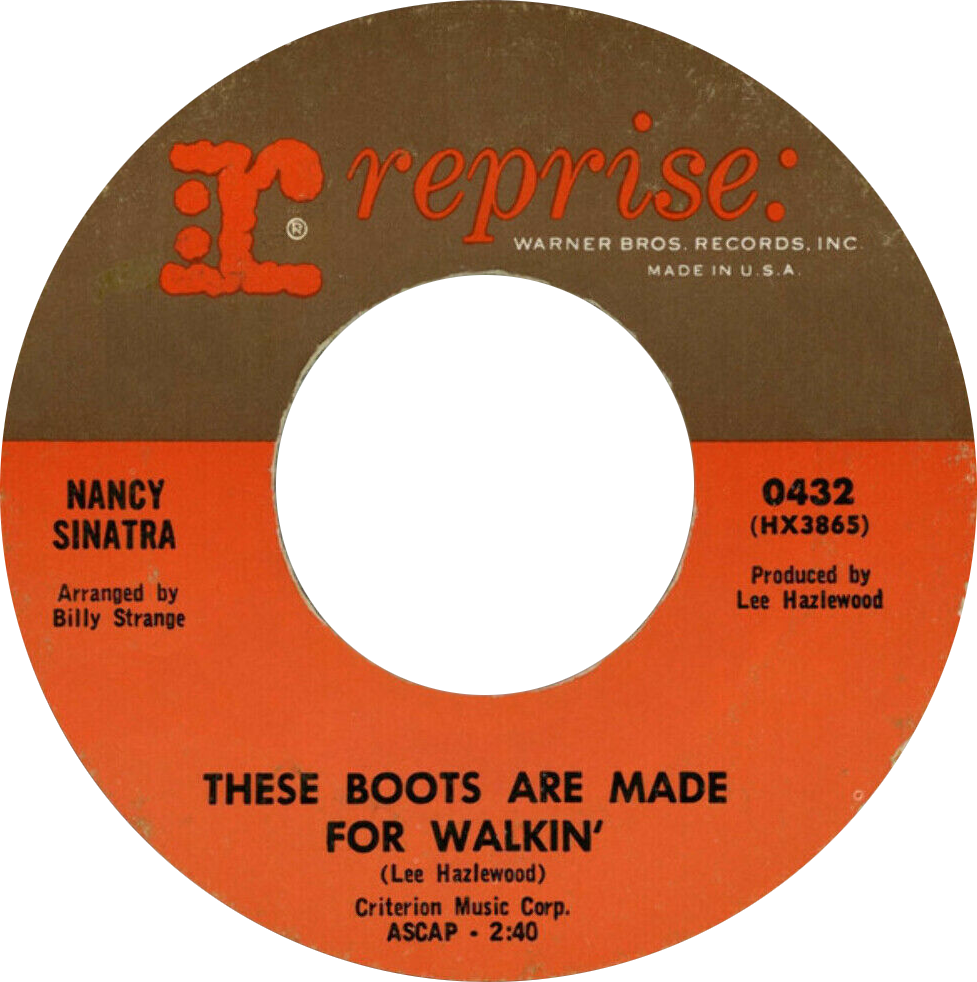
- Side A of the US single

Single by Nancy Sinatra

from the album Boots
- B-side: "The City Never Sleeps at Night"
- Released: December 16, 1965
- Recorded: November 19, 1965
- Studio: United Western, Hollywood
- Genre: Go-go; folk rock; country
- Length: 2:40
- Label: Reprise
- Songwriter: Lee Hazlewood
- Producer: Lee Hazlewood

Nancy Sinatra singles chronology
| "So Long, Babe" (1965) | "These Boots Are Made for Walkin'" (1965) | "How Does That Grab You, Darlin'?" (1966) |

Official Audio
- "These Boots Are Made for Walkin'" on YouTube

"These Boots Are Made for Walkin'" is a hit song written by Lee Hazlewood and recorded by American singer Nancy Sinatra. It charted on January 22, 1966, and reached No. 1 both in the United States Billboard Hot 100 and in the UK singles chart.

Subsequently, many cover versions of the song have been released in a range of styles: metal, pop, rock, punk rock, country, dance, and industrial. Among the more notable versions are the singles released by Megadeth, Billy Ray Cyrus and Jessica Simpson.

== Nancy Sinatra version ==
The song was written by Lee Hazlewood; it was inspired by a line spoken by Frank Sinatra in the comedy-western film 4 for Texas (1963): "They tell me them boots ain't built for walkin'."

Nancy Sinatra's version of the song was released as a single in December 1965, as the second song to be taken from her debut album, Boots (1966), and was a follow-up to the minor hit "So Long, Babe". The song became an instant success and, in late February 1966, it topped the Billboard Hot 100 chart, a move it replicated in similar charts across the world.

Billboard described the song as "fine folk-rock material" and praised Sinatra's vocal performance and "the Billy Strange driving dance beat." Cash Box described it as a "funky, slow-shufflin' folk-rocker about a gal who serves notice on her boyfriend that she can't be pushed around."

In 2020, the 1965 recording of the song was inducted into the Grammy Hall of Fame.

=== Recording ===
Lee Hazlewood intended to record the song himself, saying that "it's not really a girl's song", but Sinatra talked him out of it, saying that "coming from a guy it was harsh and abusive, but was perfect for a little girl to sing". Hazlewood agreed. Sinatra's recording of the song was made with the help of Los Angeles session musicians known as the Wrecking Crew. This session included Don Randi on piano and Chuck Berghofer on double bass, providing the notable bass line with its quarter-tone descent. The session was held on November 19, 1965, at United Western Recorders in Hollywood, and additionally produced the songs "For Some" and "The City Never Sleeps at Night".

=== Promotional film ===
In the same year, Sinatra recorded a promotional film, which would later be known as the music video, for the song. It was produced for Color-Sonics and played on Scopitone video jukeboxes. The film was directed by choreographer Robert Sidney and was produced by Official Films at Paramount Studios in Hollywood. In 1986, for the song's 20th anniversary, cable station VH1 played the video.

Sinatra told Alison Martino that other videos and performances are from TV shows like The Ed Sullivan Show, Hullaballoo and Shindig! These other videos featured Sinatra wearing an iconic pair of red leather boots.

=== In popular culture ===
In 2006 Pitchfork Media selected it as the 114th best song of the 1960s. Critic Tom Breihan described the song as "maybe the finest bitchy kiss-off in pop history".

Goodyear Tire and Rubber Company used portions of the song for its 1960s ad campaign promoting its "wide boots" tires. Nancy Sinatra unsuccessfully sued Goodyear for using the song, claiming that it had violated her publicity rights.

During the 1993 standoff in Waco, Texas between David Koresh and the FBI, the FBI played Sinatra's recording of the song on a loudspeaker in an attempt to torment Koresh and his followers in hopes they would surrender. The song was interpolated and sampled on Beyoncé's 2024 country album Cowboy Carter in the song "Ya Ya", which was later nominated for Best Americana Performance at the 67th Annual Grammy Awards."

The song was covered by Sabrina Carpenter and Kacey Musgraves during Carpenter's set at Outside Lands Festival in August 2024.

=== Track listing ===
- UK promotional single
1. "These Boots Are Made for Walkin'" – 3:03
2. "The City Never Sleeps at Night" – 2:54

=== Personnel ===
Other personnel, as seen in the American Federation of Musicians (AFM) contracts for the session include:

- Chuck Berghofer – double bass
- Carol Kaye - electric bass
- Nick Bonney – guitar
- Eddie Brackett Jr. – engineer
- Roy V. Caton – (contractor) trumpet
- Jerry Cole – guitar
- Donald R. Frost – drums
- Lee Hazlewood – supervisor
- Plas Johnson – tenor sax
- Don Lanier – guitar
- William Miller (no instrument listed)
- Oliver Mitchell – trumpet
- Lou Norell – guitar
- Richard Perissi – French horn
- William Pitman – guitar
- Don Randi – keyboard
- Emil Richards – percussion
- Billy Strange – arranger, conductor, and guitar

Despite claims by Wrecking Crew musicians Hal Blaine and Carol Kaye that they played on the track, the contract does not mention them as being present at the session, although they could have been last minute additions.

=== Charts ===
==== Weekly charts ====
| Chart (1966) | Peak position |
|---|---|
| Argentina (CAPIF) | 1 |
| Australia (Kent Music Report) | 1 |
| Austria (Ö3 Austria Top 40) | 7 |
| Canada Top Singles (RPM) | 1 |
| Denmark (Danish Singles Chart) | 1 |
| Finland (Suomen virallinen lista) | 4 |
| France (IFOP) | 13 |
| Ireland (IRMA) | 1 |
| Italy (Italian Singles Chart) | 3 |
| Malaysia (Radio Malaysia) | 2 |
| Mexico (Mexican Singles Chart) | 3 |
| Netherlands (Dutch Singles Chart) | 1 |
| New Zealand (RIANZ) | 1 |
| Norway (VG-lista) | 3 |
| Singapore (Radio Singapore) | 1 |
| South Africa (Springbok Radio) | 1 |
| Sweden (Sverigetopplistan) | 5 |
| Switzerland (Schweizer Hitparade) | 5 |
| UK Singles (OCC) | 1 |
| US Billboard Hot 100 (Billboard) | 1 |
| West Germany (Official German Charts) | 2 |

==== Year-end charts ====
| Chart (1966) | Position |
|---|---|
| Australia (AMR) | 1 |
| Austria (Ö3 Austria Top 40) | 6 |
| Belgium (Ultratop 50 Flanders) | 6 |
| Canada (CHUM) | 3 |
| Netherlands (Dutch Top 40) | 2 |
| South Africa | 1 |
| UK Singles | 5 |
| UK Record Retailer Chart | 6 |
| US Billboard Hot 100 | 6 |

=== Certifications and sales ===
| Region | Certification | Certified units/sales |
|---|---|---|
| Germany physical sales | — | 400,000 |
| Italy (FIMI) | Gold | 50,000^{‡} |
| Netherlands | — | 100,000 |
| New Zealand (RMNZ) | Platinum | 30,000^{‡} |
| Spain (Promusicae) | Gold | 30,000^{‡} |
| United Kingdom physical sales | — | 250,000 |
| United Kingdom (BPI) sales since 2004 | Silver | 200,000^{‡} |
| United States (RIAA) | Gold | 1,000,000^{^} |
Summaries
| Worldwide | — | 4,000,000 |
^{^} Shipments figures based on certification alone.^{‡} Sales+streaming figures based on certification alone.

=== Release history ===
| Country | Date | Format | Label |
|---|---|---|---|
| United Kingdom | February 1, 2000 | Promotional single — digital download | EMI, Maverick |

== Billy Ray Cyrus version ==
"These Boots Are Made for Walkin'"

Single by Billy Ray Cyrus

from the album Some Gave All
- Released: November 16, 1992
- Genre: Country
- Length: 3:31
- Label: Curb
- Songwriter: Lee Hazlewood
- Producers: Joe Scaife, Jim Cotton

Billy Ray Cyrus singles chronology
| "Wher'm I Gonna Live?" (1992) | "These Boots Are Made for Walkin'" (1992) | "She's Not Cryin' Anymore" (1993) |

In 1992, Billy Ray Cyrus covered the song and included it on his debut album, Some Gave All (1992). Later, the cover was included on the compilations De Nationale Voorjaars CD 1993, Alle 40 goed – Country and The Definitive Collection.

=== Track listing ===
CD-maxi

1. "These Boots Are Made for Walkin'" – 2:48
2. "Ain't No Good Goodbye" – 3:22
3. "Could've Been Me" (acoustic mix) – 3:45

=== Charts ===
| Chart (1992–1993) | Peak position |
|---|---|
| Belgium (Ultratop 50 Flanders) | 32 |
| Netherlands (Dutch Top 40) | 27 |
| Netherlands (Single Top 100) | 27 |
| New Zealand (Recorded Music NZ) | 42 |
| UK Singles (Official Charts) | 63 |

== Jessica Simpson version ==
"These Boots Are Made for Walkin'"

Single by Jessica Simpson

from the album The Dukes of Hazzard: Music from the Motion Picture
- Released: June 20, 2005
- Genre: Country pop; dance-pop
- Length: 3:41
- Label: Columbia
- Songwriters: Lee Hazlewood, Jessica Simpson (additional; uncredited)
- Producer: Jimmy Jam and Terry Lewis

Jessica Simpson singles chronology
| "Angels" (2004) | "These Boots Are Made for Walkin'" (2005) | "A Public Affair" (2006) |

Music video
- "Jessica Simpson - These Boots Are Made for Walkin' (Video)" on YouTube

Jessica Simpson recorded her own version of "These Boots Are Made for Walkin'" (and added her own lyrics) for the soundtrack to the film The Dukes of Hazzard (2005). The version was also included in the international version of her fifth studio album, A Public Affair (2006). Simpson's cover was co-produced by Jimmy Jam and Terry Lewis and was released as the soundtrack's first single on June 20, 2005. It became Simpson's fifth top-20 single in the United States, and its music video drew controversy because of its sexual imagery.

=== Recording and release ===
Simpson's version of the song is performed from the point of view of her character in The Dukes of Hazzard, Daisy Duke, and it has several major differences from Sinatra's version. The song's lyrics were changed almost completely as Simpson felt that they did not accurately convey the feelings needed for the film; in the original Sinatra dealt with a cheating boyfriend, while in the new version Simpson explored Daisy Duke's personality and experiences. She rewrote the majority of the lyrics herself, although some elements were retained such as the opening line "You keep saying you got something for me..." and the spoken "Are you ready, boots? Start walkin'".

Simpson also added some new music to her version of the song. Whereas the original version did not have a bridge, she created one for the cover. A risqué rap-like/spoken breakdown was added after the bridge. Because of the legalities of songwriting, Simpson has not been credited for the new music or lyrics that she wrote. The production of the song was altered as well. Producers Jimmy Jam and Terry Lewis gave the cover a country-inspired production because of its relationship to the film The Dukes of Hazzard, but they also added a more hip hop-like beat.

=== Chart performance ===
"These Boots Are Made for Walkin'" peaked at fourteen on the US Billboard Hot 100, and in late 2005 the RIAA certified the single Gold for 500,000 legal downloads or more. Its digital downloads were high, but radio airplay was low. Due to this, it is the song that reached the lowest chart position on the Billboard Hot 100 for a song topping the Hot Digital Songs chart. It reached the top ten on Billboard's Pop 100 chart, and was Simpson's first single to appear on the chart. On July 23, 2005, the song jumped from 8 – 1 on Hot Digital Songs charts in its second week with 43,000 downloads. On December 11, 2006, the single was certified Gold by the RIAA again, this time by Epic Records. In total, the single has received 1 million digital downloads.

Internationally it was a success, reaching top 5 in several European countries. It became her biggest hit in Australia, where it reached number two and remained in the top forty for twenty-four weeks. In Ireland, the single also reached number 2. The song also cracked the top five in the United Kingdom, where it reached number four and is to date, her highest peaking single in Britain. It reached the top ten in the chart European Hot 100 Singles, Belgium, and New Zealand and the top twenty in Austria, Switzerland, and Germany. As the end of the year 2005, the single had sold 69,500 copies in UK.

=== Music video ===
The music video, directed by Brett Ratner, caused controversy because of its sexual imagery.

=== Track listing ===
1. "These Boots Are Made for Walkin'" (Radio edit) – 4:10
2. "With You" (Live from Universal Amphitheater)
3. "Take My Breath Away" (Live from Universal Amphitheater)
4. "I Think I'm in Love with You" (Live from Universal Amphitheater)
5. "These Boots Are Made for Walkin'" (Video clip)

=== Charts ===
==== Weekly charts ====
| Chart (2005) | Peak position |
|---|---|
| Australia (ARIA) | 2 |
| Austria (Ö3 Austria Top 40) | 12 |
| Belgium (Ultratip Bubbling Under Flanders) | 10 |
| Belgium (Ultratip Bubbling Under Wallonia) | 14 |
| European Hot 100 Singles (Billboard) | 7 |
| Germany (GfK) | 17 |
| Greece (IFPI) | 18 |
| Ireland (IRMA) | 2 |
| Netherlands (Dutch Top 40) | 35 |
| Netherlands (Single Top 100) | 27 |
| New Zealand (Recorded Music NZ) | 10 |
| Romania (Romanian Top 100) | 81 |
| Scottish Singles Sales (Official Charts) | 2 |
| Switzerland (Schweizer Hitparade) | 16 |
| UK Singles (Official Charts) | 4 |
| US Billboard Hot 100 | 14 |
| US Dance Club Songs (Billboard) | 35 |
| US Pop Airplay (Billboard) | 34 |
| US Pop 100 (Billboard) | 12 |

==== Year-end charts ====
| Chart (2005) | Position |
|---|---|
| Australia (ARIA) | 16 |
| Germany (Media Control GfK) | 98 |
| Ireland (IRMA) | 19 |
| UK Singles (OCC) | 78 |
| US Pop 100 (Billboard) | 99 |

| Chart (2006) | Position |
|---|---|
| Australia (ARIA) | 85 |

=== Certifications ===
| Region | Certification | Certified units/sales |
|---|---|---|
| Australia (ARIA) | Platinum | 70,000^{^} |
| New Zealand (RMNZ) | Gold | 5,000^{*} |
| United States (RIAA) | Gold | 500,000^{*} |
| United States (RIAA) Mastertone | Gold | 500,000^{*} |
^{*} Sales figures based on certification alone.^{^} Shipments figures based on certification alone.

=== Release history ===
| Region | Date | Format(s) | Label(s) | Ref. |
|---|---|---|---|---|
| United States | June 20, 2005 | Contemporary hit radio | Columbia | |
| United Kingdom | August 29, 2005 | CD | Columbia | |
| Australia | September 5, 2005 | CD | Columbia | |

== Megadeth version ==
"These Boots"

Song by Megadeth

from the album Killing Is My Business... and Business Is Good!
- Released: June 12, 1985
- Recorded: December 1984 – January 1985
- Studio: Indigo Ranch, Malibu, California; Crystal Sound Labs, Hollywood, California
- Genre: Speed metal; thrash metal
- Length: 3:44
- Label: Combat
- Songwriter: Lee Hazlewood
- Producers: Megadeth; Karat Faye

American thrash metal band Megadeth covered the song on their 1985 debut album Killing Is My Business... and Business Is Good!, which is track four on the original release and eight on the 2002 re-release. Their version (entitled "These Boots") featured altered lyrics, and was produced more as a parody than a true cover.

When the album started selling well, the writer of the song, Lee Hazlewood, began demanding that the song be omitted, due to its being a "perversion of the original". In the liner notes of the album's 2002 reissue, Megadeth frontman Dave Mustaine was strongly critical of Hazlewood, noting that he had received royalties for almost ten years before he objected to the altered version. The song was included as a bonus track on that version, with many lyrics censored (mostly Mustaine's variations, but some other lines were also censored for comedic effect). In 2011, an uncensored live version recorded in 1987 was released as part of the 25th anniversary edition of the album Peace Sells... but Who's Buying?. In 2018, the song was released with the original Lee Hazlewood lyrics on the remixed and remastered version of Killing Is My Business... and Business Is Good!

In 1987, Megadeth re-recorded the song as part of the soundtrack for Penelope Spheeris' film Dudes, changing the title to "These Boots Are Made for Walkin'". This version of the song was the last song the band recorded with Gar Samuelson and Chris Poland, as the two would be kicked out later in the year for their drug habits. This version uses the same altered lyrics as the 1985 original.

=== Personnel ===
Production and performance credits are adapted from the liner notes of Killing Is My Business... and Business Is Good!.

Megadeth

- Dave Mustaine – rhythm guitar, lead vocals
- David Ellefson – bass, backing vocals
- Chris Poland – lead guitar
- Gar Samuelson – drums

Production

- Produced and mixed by Dave Mustaine and Karat Faye
- Co-produced by Megadeth
- Pre-production by Jay Jones

2002 remix and remaster

- Mixed by Bill Kennedy
- Pro Tools by Chris Vrenna
- Mastered by Tom Baker

The Final Kill 2018 remix and remaster

- Mixed by Mark Lewis
- Mastered by Ted Jensen
