= Back to Tennessee =

Studio album by Billy Ray Cyrus
- Released: April 7, 2009
- Recorded: 2008
- Studio: Starstruck Studios
- Genre: Country
- Length: 44:16
- Label: Lyric Street
- Producers: Glen Ballard, Mark Bright, Alan Silvestri

Billy Ray Cyrus chronology
Love Songs (2008)	Back to Tennessee (2009)	Icon (2011)

Singles from Back to Tennessee
- 1. "Somebody Said a Prayer" Released: August 16, 2008; 2. "Back to Tennessee" Released: February 2, 2009; 3. "A Good Day" Released: July 20, 2009

Professional ratings
Review scores
Source	Rating
AllMusic	2/5 stars
Billboard	(favorable)
Engine 145	2/5 stars
Entertainment Weekly	D+
People	3/4 stars
The Washington Post	(average)

Back to Tennessee is the eleventh studio album released from country music singer Billy Ray Cyrus. The album was released on April 7, 2009, on Lyric Street Records. It is also the follow-up album to 2007s Home at Last. Originally planned to be released in July 2008, the album was pushed to new release dates five times. "Somebody Said a Prayer" was released as the album's lead-off single, and was a top 40 hit on the country charts in late 2008. The title track and "A Good Day" followed it as the second and third singles, reaching number 47 and number #59, respectively. Also on the album is "Butterfly Fly Away", a duet with daughter Miley Cyrus. The song is also on the Hannah Montana: The Movie soundtrack. Cyrus and Lyric Street Records parted ways shortly after the chart debut of "A Good Day".

== Content ==
"Somebody Said a Prayer", the title-track and "A Good Day" have been released from Back to Tennessee. Additionally, "Butterfly Fly Away" (a duet with daughter Miley Cyrus), was released as a promotional single for Hannah Montana: The Movie.

"Thrillbilly", an album-cut, was also turned into a music video; it premiered on May 22, 2009. The song was originally planned to be the third single release from the album, but it was later changed to "A Good Day".

The song "I Could Be the One" was recorded and released by country music singer Glen Templeton as his debut single in April 2011. The song debuted at number 58 on the Billboard Hot Country Songs chart for the week ending July 30, 2011. "He's Mine" also appears on Rodney Atkins' 2011 album Take a Back Road, from which it was released as a single in late 2011.

=== "Somebody Said a Prayer" ===
The album's first single, "Somebody Said a Prayer", was released to radio on August 16, 2008, where it debuted at number 53 on the U.S. Billboard Hot Country Songs chart. Due to the success of its predecessor, "Ready, Set, Don't Go", critics were expecting the song to be Cyrus' solo comeback to country music. However, the song only managed to reach a peak of number 33 in November 2008.

"Somebody Said a Prayer" was also made into a music video, directed by Roman White. It was then released to CMT and GAC in September 2008.

=== "Back to Tennessee" ===
The title track to the album was then released as the second single on February 2, 2009. However, the song entered the charts for the week of March 14, 2009, where it entered at number 59. That same week, Cyrus' daughter, Miley Cyrus, charted her first solo country single, "The Climb", which also entered for the week of March 14, at number 48. With father-daughter charting separate singles at the same time, it made chart history. That was the first time a father-daughter charted their own singles since Johnny Cash and Rosanne Cash did so in 1990. Both singles were released in promotion of Hannah Montana: The Movie. The music video for "Back to Tennessee" debuted on CMT on March 12, 2009, directed by Declan Whitebloom.

=== "A Good Day" ===
The third single from the album is "A Good Day", which was released on July 20, 2009. However, the single did not enter the country songs chart until September 5, where it entered at number 60. After spending two non-consecutive weeks on the country charts, the song managed to peak at number 59, following the departure of Cyrus from Lyric Street Records.

The song's narrator recalls a "good day" that he had with a former lover. Bobby Peacock of Roughstock reviewed the song unfavorably, saying, "Amidst a generic wall of guitars courtesy of (over)producer Mark Bright, Cyrus starts off in that soft yet gritty tone that has worked so well on many of his other ballads. Somewhere along the way, though, he loses interest and fades into a lifeless monotone. Even more unusual is that half of the words in the chorus come out forced and clipped."

== Track listing ==
All tracks were produced by Mark Bright, except "Butterfly Fly Away", which was produced by Glen Ballard and Alan Silvestri. In the United Kingdom version of the album, "Ready, Set, Don't Go" and "Over the Rainbow" were added.

No.	Title	Writer(s)	Length
1.	"Back to Tennessee"	Billy Ray Cyrus, Tamara Dunn, Matthew Wilder	4:12
2.	"Thrillbilly"	J.R. Shelby, Marty Dodson, Danny Orton	3:22
3.	"He's Mine"	Casey Beathard, Tim James, Phil O'Donnell	3:44
4.	"Somebody Said a Prayer"	Neil Thrasher, Craig Wiseman	4:06
5.	"A Good Day"	Danny Orton, Jennifer Schott	4:08
6.	"I Could Be the One"	Jay Knowles, Thom McHugh	3:03
7.	"Like Nothing Else"	Blair Daly, Troy Verges, Barry Dean	4:25
8.	"Country as Country Can Be"	Cyrus, Beathard, Mick Adkins	3:25
9.	"Love Is the Lesson"	Rivers Rutherford, Steve McEwan	3:46
10.	"Give It to Somebody"	Jeffrey Steele, Tom Hambridge	3:41
11.	"Real Gone"	Sheryl Crow, John Shanks	3:40
12.	"Butterfly Fly Away" (bonus track; with Miley Cyrus)	Glen Ballard, Alan Silvestri	4:44

== Personnel ==
- Steve Brewster – drums
- Tom Bukovac – electric guitar
- Lisa Cochran – background vocals
- Perry Coleman – background vocals
- Billy Ray Cyrus – lead vocals
- Miley Cyrus – vocals on "Butterfly Fly Away"
- Eric Darken – percussion
- Shannon Forrest – drums
- Kenny Greenberg – electric guitar
- Aubrey Haynie – fiddle
- Wes Hightower – background vocals
- Mike Johnson – steel guitar
- Charlie Judge – keyboards
- Chris McHugh – drums
- Jimmy Nichols – keyboards
- Jimmie Lee Sloas – bass guitar
- Chris Stapleton – background vocals
- David A. Stewart – electric guitar solo on "Butterfly Fly Away"
- Ilya Toshinsky – acoustic guitar
- Jonathan Yudkin – violin, viola, cello, string arrangements

== Chart performance ==
=== Album ===
The album debuted at number 41 on the U.S. Billboard all-genre 200, number 42 on the all-genre Top Comprehensive Albums and number 13 on the Top Country Albums chart, as well as number 21 in Canada. In its opening week, Back to Tennessee sold approximately 14,000 copies in the U.S. As of May 23, 2009, the album has sold 29,000 copies in the U.S.

Chart (2009)	Peak position
U.S. Billboard 200	41
U.S. Billboard Top Comprehensive Albums	42
U.S. Billboard Top Country Albums	13

=== Singles ===
Year	Single	Peak positions
Year	Single	US Country
2008	"Somebody Said a Prayer"	33
2009	"Back to Tennessee"	47
2009	"A Good Day"	59

=== Other charted songs ===
Year	Single	Peak chart positions			
Year	Single	US	CAN	IRE	UK
2009	"Butterfly Fly Away" (with Miley Cyrus)	56	50	46	78

== Release history ==
Region	Date	Format
United States	April 7, 2009	CD, digital download
Canada	April 7, 2009	CD, digital download
Australia	April 7, 2009	CD, digital download
United Kingdom	April 20, 2009	CD, digital download
