= It's All the Same to Me =

Single by Billy Ray Cyrus

from the album The Best of Billy Ray Cyrus: Cover to Cover
- B-side: "Achy Breaky Heart"
- Released: May 31, 1997
- Genre: Country
- Length: 4:25
- Label: Mercury
- Songwriters: Kerry Kurt Phillips, Jerry Laseter
- Producers: Keith Stegall, John Kelton

Billy Ray Cyrus singles chronology
"Three Little Words" (1997)	"It's All the Same to Me" (1997)	"Time for Letting Go" (1998)

"It's All the Same to Me" is a song written by Kerry Kurt Phillips and Jerry Laseter, and recorded by American country music artist Billy Ray Cyrus. It was released in May 1997 as the first single from his compilation album The Best of Billy Ray Cyrus: Cover to Cover. The song reached #19 on the Billboard Hot Country Singles & Tracks chart. In 2017, Chuck Dauphin of Billboard ranked it as the best song in Cyrus's career.

== Chart performance ==
Chart (1997)	Peak position
Canada Country Singles (RPM)	14
US Hot Country Songs (Billboard)	19
