= Beautiful Scars (Will Smith and Big Sean song) =

2025 single by Will Smith and Big Sean featuring OBanga

Single by Will Smith and Big Sean featuring OBanga

from the album Based on a True Story
- Released: January 30, 2025
- Genre: Hip-hop
- Length: 3:46
- Label: Slang Music; ADA
- Songwriters: Chllr; LeXoskeleton; OmArr; Sean Anderson; Willard Smith
- Producers: LeXoskeleton; OmArr

Will Smith singles chronology
"Tantrum" (2025)	"Beautiful Scars" (2025)	"First Love" (2025)

Big Sean singles chronology
"It Is What It Is" (2024)	"Beautiful Scars" (2025)

Music video
- "Will Smith & Big Sean - Beautiful Scars feat. OBanga" on YouTube

Audio sample
- file; help

"Beautiful Scars" is a song by American actor and rapper Will Smith alongside American rapper Big Sean, featuring OBanga. It was released on January 30, 2025. The song was written by Smith, Big Sean, Chllr, LeXo Skeleton, and OmArr, with production by LeXo Skeleton and OmArr. it was mixed by Rafael Fadul, with assistant engineering by Bere Gonzalo, and mastered by Ricardo Sangiao.

The track marks Smith's return to music, following his last album, Lost and Found (2005). It precedes his fifth album, Based on a True Story, which was released in March 2025.

An official music video was released simultaneously alongside the song. It draws inspiration from the 1999 sci-fi film The Matrix, a role Smith declined in the late 1990s. The video was directed by Adil El Arbi and Bilall Fallah, known for their work on Bad Boys for Life (2020) and its sequel Bad Boys: Ride or Die (2024), both of which starred Smith.

== Background and release ==
In 2019, Will Smith uploaded a video to his YouTube channel explaining that he declined the role of Neo in The Matrix in 1997 because the Wachowski siblings' pitch did not resonate with him. According to Smith, the directors focused on describing their unique filmmaking style rather than outlining the film's plot, which influenced his decision to pass on the role. In January 2025, Smith alluded to The Matrix in a cryptic Instagram post. The post included text stating that in 1997, the Wachowskis had offered him the role of Neo, but he chose to star in Wild Wild West instead, believing it was a better fit for him at the time. The post sparked speculation that Smith would be starring in a fifth Matrix movie that entered development at Warner Bros. one year earlier, though this has since been confirmed to not be the case.

In December 2024, Will Smith and Joyner Lucas collaborated on the "Tantrum", released via The Orchard. The song serves as a letter to their inner children, addressing past struggles and personal growth.

Smith announced his return to music with the single "Beautiful Scars", featuring rapper Big Sean in January 2025. The track, was set for release on January 30, 2025, marks Smith's first major musical project in nearly two decades, following his 2005 album Lost and Found. As part of the rollout, Smith shared a cinematic trailer inspired by The Matrix, hinting at the song's introspective themes and bold production.

The trailer for "Beautiful Scars", released on Smith's social media platforms, presents a futuristic setting inspired by The Matrix franchise. In the visuals, Smith, wearing a long black trench coat and sunglasses, moves through a simulated environment before meeting Big Sean. The trailer incorporates slow-motion sequences and digital effects. "Beautiful Scars" was released on January 30, 2025, under US Slang Music and serves as the lead single for Smith's fifth studio album. The song's promotional campaign, including the high-production trailer, reflects a carefully planned return to music.

== Composition ==
"Beautiful Scars" writing and producing credit from Smith, Big Sean, Chllr, LeXo Skeleton, and OmArr and producing credit from LeXo Skeleton, and OmArr, with mixing by Rafael Fadul, with assistant engineering by Bere Gonzalo, and mastered by Ricardo Sangiao. It has been labeled as a hip-hop and R&B-influenced track that features introspective lyrics alongside cinematic production. The song incorporates melodic instrumentals, atmospheric synths, and a deep bassline, creating a reflective tone. Its mid-tempo rhythm, layered vocal harmonies, and orchestral elements contribute to the song's emotive quality.

Lyrically, Smith reflects on personal challenges, career experiences, and life lessons, while Big Sean's verse emphasizes resilience and perseverance. The chorus, performed by OBanga, centers on the theme of embracing past experiences as a source of strength. The song's message aligns with themes of personal growth and self-reflection.

== Critical reception ==
Some reviewers have praised the song's motivational message and introspective lyrics. Pure M Magazine described it as "an incredibly touching and consistently captivating rap offering that remains exceedingly riveting and marvellously moving throughout."

The music video has also been a focal point of discussion. Polygon highlighted its Matrix-themed concept, noting that Smith reenacts iconic scenes from the film, with Big Sean portraying Morpheus.

== Music video ==
Will Smith offers a choice: red pill or blue pill.

The accompanying music video (directed by Adil El Arbi and Bilall Fallah) pays homage to the 1999 film The Matrix, a role Smith famously declined. In the video, Smith portrays Neo, while Big Sean takes on the role of Morpheus. The narrative humorously references Smith's past decisions, including his choice to pass on The Matrix and the 2022 Oscars Chris Rock–Will Smith slapping incident.

The video opens with a reference to the red pill vs. blue pill scene, symbolizing self-discovery and transformation. Throughout the video, Smith navigates a futuristic, cyberpunk world filled with slow-motion action sequences, bullet-dodging stunts, and gravity-defying fight scenes reminiscent of the original film. The music video received widespread attention, with fans praising its cinematic quality, nostalgic elements, and Will Smith's return to music after a long hiatus.

== Credits and personnel ==
Credits are adapted from the song's Spotify page.

Primary artists

- Will Smith
- Big Sean

Songwriters

- Willard Carroll Smith II (Will Smith)
- Sean Michael Leonard Anderson (Big Sean)
- Chllr
- LeXo Skeleton
- OmArr (OBanga)

Producers

- LeXo Skeleton
- OmArr

Mixing and mastering

- Rafael Fadul – mixing engineer
- Ricardo Sangiao – mastering engineer
- Bere Gonzalo – assistant engineering

Additional credits

- Video director – Adil El Arbi and Bilall Fallah
