= The Dukes of Hazzard (disambiguation) =

The Dukes of Hazzard is an American television series.

The Dukes of Hazzard may also refer to:

- The Dukes of Hazzard (television soundtrack), the soundtrack for the television series.
- The Dukes of Hazzard (film), a 2005 film loosely based on the television series
  - The Dukes of Hazzard (film soundtrack), the soundtrack for the film
- The Dukes of Hazzard (video game)
