= List of number-one digital songs of 2005 (U.S.) =

2005 highest-selling digital singles in the United States

The highest-selling digital singles in the United States are ranked in the Hot Digital Songs chart, published by Billboard magazine. The data are compiled by Nielsen SoundScan based on each single's weekly digital sales, which combines sales of different versions of a single for a summarized figure.

== Chart history ==
Key
†	Indicates best-charting digital song of 2005

Issue date	Song	Artist(s)	Weekly sales	Ref(s)
January 22	"Boulevard of Broken Dreams"	Green Day		
January 29	"Boulevard of Broken Dreams"	Green Day		
February 5	"Boulevard of Broken Dreams"	Green Day		
February 12	"Boulevard of Broken Dreams"	Green Day	31,000	
February 19	"Candy Shop"	50 Cent featuring Olivia	40,000	
February 26	"Candy Shop"	50 Cent featuring Olivia		
March 5	"Candy Shop"	50 Cent featuring Olivia	55,500	
March 12	"Candy Shop"	50 Cent featuring Olivia	50,500	
March 19	"Candy Shop"	50 Cent featuring Olivia	48,000	
March 26	"Candy Shop"	50 Cent featuring Olivia	47,500	
April 2	"Candy Shop"	50 Cent featuring Olivia		
April 9	"Candy Shop"	50 Cent featuring Olivia		
April 16	"Switch"	Will Smith	40,000	
April 23	"Beverly Hills"	Weezer	40,500	
April 30	"Hollaback Girl" †	Gwen Stefani		
May 7	"Hollaback Girl" †	Gwen Stefani	58,500	
May 14	"Hollaback Girl" †	Gwen Stefani		
May 21	"Hollaback Girl" †	Gwen Stefani	61,500	
May 28	"Hollaback Girl" †	Gwen Stefani		
June 4	"Hollaback Girl" †	Gwen Stefani		
June 11	"Hollaback Girl" †	Gwen Stefani		
June 18	"Hollaback Girl" †	Gwen Stefani		
June 25	"Don't Phunk With My Heart"	The Black Eyed Peas		
July 2	"Don't Phunk With My Heart"	The Black Eyed Peas		
July 9	"Don't Phunk With My Heart"	The Black Eyed Peas		
July 16	"Hollaback Girl"	Gwen Stefani		
July 23	"These Boots Are Made for Walkin'"	Jessica Simpson	43,000	
July 30	"Pon de Replay"	Rihanna		
August 6	"Pon de Replay"	Rihanna		
August 13	"Pon de Replay"	Rihanna		
August 20	"Pon de Replay"	Rihanna		
August 27	"Pon de Replay"	Rihanna		
September 3	"Just the Girl"	The Click Five	43,000	
September 10	"Just the Girl"	The Click Five		
September 17	"Gold Digger"	Kanye West featuring Jamie Foxx	80,500	
September 24	"Gold Digger"	Kanye West featuring Jamie Foxx	77,000	
October 1	"Gold Digger"	Kanye West featuring Jamie Foxx		
October 8	"Gold Digger"	Kanye West featuring Jamie Foxx	69,500	
October 15	"Photograph"	Nickelback	77,000	
October 22	"Gold Digger"	Kanye West featuring Jamie Foxx		
October 29	"Gold Digger"	Kanye West featuring Jamie Foxx		
November 5	"Gold Digger"	Kanye West featuring Jamie Foxx		
November 12	"Gold Digger"	Kanye West featuring Jamie Foxx		
November 19	"Gold Digger"	Kanye West featuring Jamie Foxx	49,500	
November 26	"My Humps"	The Black Eyed Peas		
December 3	"Hung Up"	Madonna	45,500	
December 10	"Hung Up"	Madonna		
December 17	"When I'm Gone"	Eminem	46,000	
December 24	"All I Want for Christmas Is You"	Mariah Carey	41,000	
December 31	"Don't Forget About Us"	Mariah Carey	39,000	

== See also ==
- 2005 in music
- Hot Digital Songs
