= Glen Templeton =

American country singer and songwriter

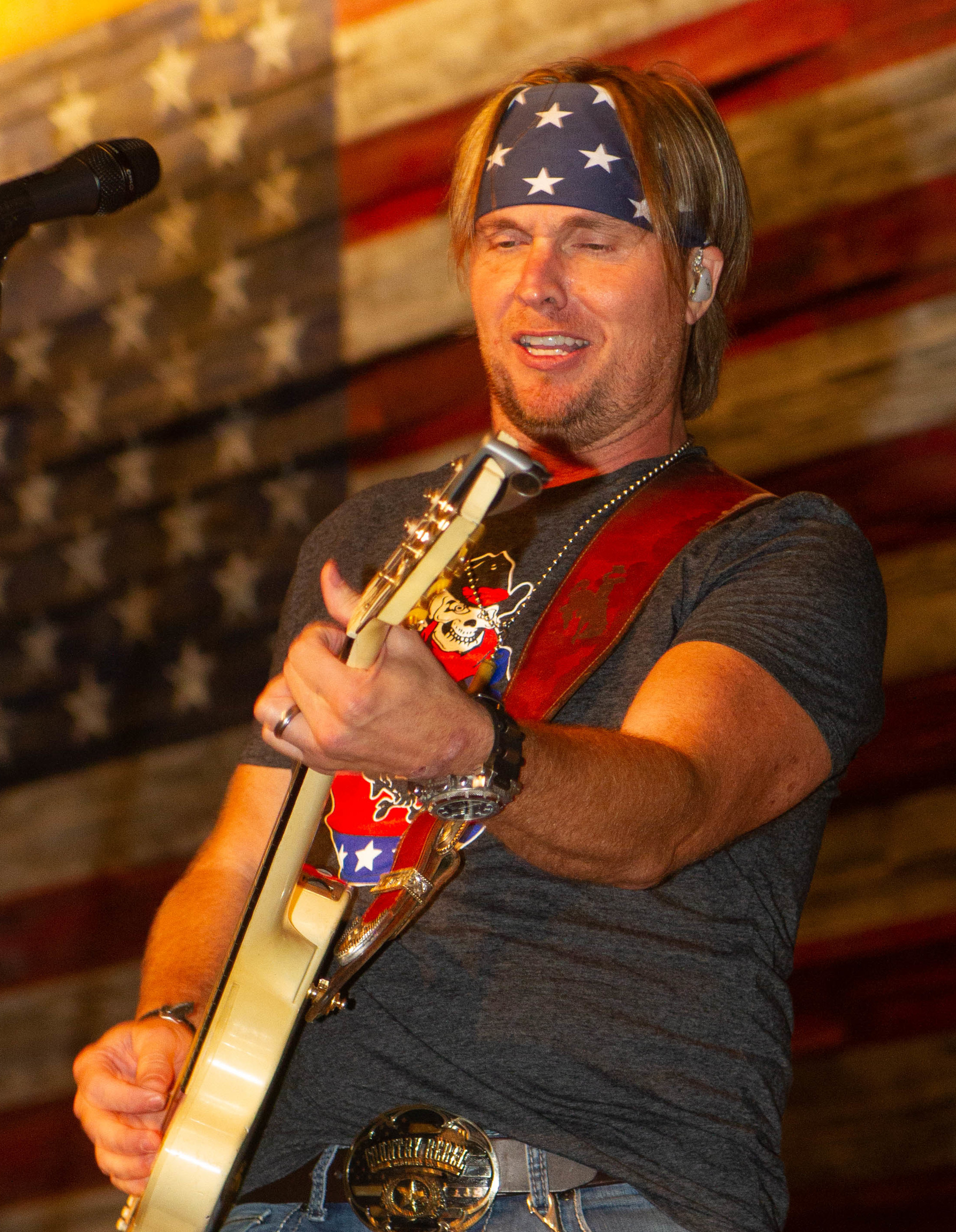
- Templeton performing in 2018

Background information
- Origin: Tuscaloosa, Alabama, United States
- Genres: Country
- Occupations: Singer-songwriter, musician
- Instruments: Vocals, guitar
- Years active: 2010–present
- Website: glen-templeton.com

Glen Templeton is an American country singer and songwriter.

== Career ==
Templeton released his debut single "I Could Be the One", written by Jay Knowles and Thom McHugh, on April 19, 2011. "I Could Be the One" was originally recorded by Billy Ray Cyrus on his 2009 album Back to Tennessee. In July 2011, Glen was signed to Black River Entertainment. Templeton also released a self-titled extended play on June 6, 2011, which included the single as well as three additional songs. "I Could Be the One" debuted at number 58 on the U.S. Billboard Hot Country Songs chart for the week ending July 30, 2011, and ultimately reached a peak of number 53. Two more singles followed: "Sing That Song Again" and "Ball Cap." "Sing That Song Again" peaked at number 60 on the Hot Country Songs chart, while "Ball Cap" (written by Cassidy Lynn Alexander, Forest Whitehead, and Dylan Scott) was released to SiriusXM Satellite Radio. In early 2015, Templeton and his label, Black River Entertainment, parted ways.

== Discography ==
=== Extended plays ===
Title	Album details	Peak positions
Title	Album details	US Country
Glen Templeton	Label: Black River Entertainment; Release date: June 6, 2011; Formats: download	—
Let Her Go	Release date: July 29, 2014; Label: Black River Entertainment; Formats: download	47
California	Release date: January 18, 2019; Label: Coastal Cowboy Entertainment; Formats: download	—
"—" denotes releases that did not chart

=== Singles ===
Year	Single	Peak positions	Album
Year	Single	US Country	Album
2011	"Country Boys for Life"	—	—
2011	"I Could Be the One"	53	Glen Templeton
2012	"Sing That Song Again"	60	Let Her Go
2013	"Ball Cap"	—	Let Her Go
2016	"Hip to Be Country"	—	California
2019	"Run with Me"	—	—
2020	"Country as You Wanna Get"	—	—

=== Music videos ===
Year	Video	Director
2011	"I Could Be the One"	Eric Welch
2012	"Country Boys For Life"	Lance Holloway
2012	"That's My Job"	Robert Chavers
2014	"Let Her Go"	Robert Chavers
