= You Can Make It =

Single by Will Smith featuring Fridayy and Sunday Service Choir

from the album Based on a True Story
- Released: June 28, 2024
- Recorded: 2024
- Genre: Gospel hip hop
- Length: 3:41
- Label: SLANG
- Songwriters: Alejandro Borrero; Austin Owens; Drew Anthony Gavin; Francis Leblanc; Isaac John De Boni; Ivanni Rodríguez; Keanu Torres; Manuel Lara; Finatik; Omarr Rambert; Will Smith
- Producers: Angela Glenn; Ayo the Producer; Chller; FNZ; Jason White; Javonte Pollard; Manuel Lara; OmArr; OneSix; Nato; Chris Iaughlin; Keanu Beats

Will Smith singles chronology
"Light 'Em Up" (2024)	"You Can Make It" (2024)	"Work of Art" (2024)

"You Can Make It" is a gospel hip hop song by rapper Will Smith featuring singer Fridayy and the Sunday Service Choir, released on June 28, 2024. Smith debuted the song in his debut performance at the BET Awards, alongside the choir and gospel singers Chandler Moore and Kirk Franklin. It is his first single since appearing on the Joyner Lucas tribute track "Will" in 2020.

The song's lyrics aim to inspire the listener to hold on amid great adversity.

Smith hinted on Instagram that this song might be from a forthcoming album called Based on a True Story, which was the final phrase in his BET Awards performance.

== Charts ==
=== Weekly ===
Weekly chart performance for "You Can Make It"
Chart (2024)	Peak position
US Hot Christian Songs (Billboard)	23
US Gospel Songs (Billboard)	3

=== Year-end ===
Year-end chart performance for "You Can Make It"
Chart (2025)	Position
US Gospel Songs (Billboard)	46
