= Party Starter =

Single by Will Smith

from the album Lost and Found
- Released: August 2, 2005
- Recorded: 2004
- Genre: Crunk
- Length: 4:23 (radio edit); 4:09 (album version)
- Label: Overbrook; Interscope
- Songwriters: Will Smith; Christopher Bridges; Jamal Jones
- Producer: Polow da Don

Will Smith singles chronology
"Switch" (2005)	"Party Starter" (2005)	"Get Lit" (2017)

"Party Starter" is a song by the American actor and rapper Will Smith. It was released on August 2, 2005 as the second and final single from his fourth studio album, Lost and Found. It was written by Smith, American rapper Ludacris and record producer Polow da Don, the latter of whom also produced the song. "Party Starter" was Smith's final single before his 12-year recording hiatus.

== Reception ==
Pittsburgh Post-Gazette writer Scott Mevins described the song as "lite crunk" and where Lost and Found picks up after the "lame start" of the opening track, "Here He Comes."

== Track listings ==
UK CD1

1. "Party Starter" (radio edit) – 4:22
2. "Party Starter" (instrumental) – 4:33
3. "Party Starter" (a cappella) – 4:07

UK CD2

1. "Party Starter" (radio edit) – 4:22
2. "Party Starter" (Freshman Remix) – 4:15
3. "Party Starter" (Co-P Grimey Mix) – 4:30
4. "Party Starter" (video) – 4:22

== Charts ==
Chart (2005)	Peak position
Australia (ARIA)	33
Australian Urban (ARIA)	12
Austria (Ö3 Austria Top 40)	62
Belgium (Ultratop 50 Flanders)	48
Belgium (Ultratip Bubbling Under Wallonia)	5
Germany (GfK)	40
Ireland (IRMA)	28
Netherlands (Dutch Top 40 Tipparade)	6
Netherlands (Single Top 100)	44
New Zealand (Recorded Music NZ)	35
Scottish Singles Sales (Official Charts)	18
Switzerland (Schweizer Hitparade)	26
UK Singles (Official Charts)	19
UK Hip Hop/R&B (Official Charts)	3

== Release history ==
Release dates and formats for "Party Starter"
Region	Date	Format	Label(s)	Ref.
United States	August 9, 2005	Mainstream airplay	Interscope	
