= Back to Tennessee (song) =

Single by Billy Ray Cyrus

from the album Back to Tennessee
- Released: February 2, 2009
- Recorded: 2008
- Genre: Country rock
- Length: 4:12
- Label: Lyric Street
- Songwriters: Billy Ray Cyrus, Tamara Dunn, Matthew Wilder
- Producer: Mark Bright

Billy Ray Cyrus singles chronology
"Somebody Said a Prayer" (2008)	"Back to Tennessee" (2009)	"A Good Day" (2009)

"Back to Tennessee" is a country rock song by American singer-songwriter and actor Billy Ray Cyrus. It released as the second single from Cyrus' eleventh studio album of the same name on February 2, 2009 by Lyric Street Records. Cyrus drafted the song after learning that Hannah Montana: The Movie, a film he would star in, would be set in Tennessee. The song, developed with the aid of co-songwriters Tamara Dunn and Matthew Wilder, includes country rock elements while describing Cyrus' longing to return to the South, where he grew up, after spending several years in Los Angeles. "Back to Tennessee" was featured in both Hannah Montana: The Movie and its soundtrack.

"Back to Tennessee" was well received by critics, though some felt it took the album's message too literally. It was a moderate commercial achievement for Cyrus and charted within the top fifty of the Billboard magazine chart Hot Country Songs. The song's music video was directed by Declan Whitebloom and features scenes of Cyrus at a beach inter cut with clips of Hannah Montana: The Movie. The song was performed in several venues.

== Development ==
Cyrus moved to Los Angeles to star on the Disney Channel television series Hannah Montana in 2006. Cyrus's character, Robby Ray Stewart, is a former country singer and the father of Miley Stewart, a popstar played by Miley Cyrus, Cyrus' real life daughter. The television series became a worldwide hit and the basis for Hannah Montana: The Movie, a feature film released in 2009.

Cyrus first read the script for Hannah Montana: The Movie while in Malibu in early 2008. The film's plot features the Stewarts leaving Hollywood for a summer and returning to Tennessee, their home state, to reconnect with their southern roots. Having grown up in Kentucky, Cyrus was excited to learn the film would be set in the country and fought for it to be filmed on location. "They were gonna film it in a different state [but] I just knew that Tennessee had all the facilities, the man power, and the ability to make this film great," said Cyrus. In addition, Cyrus believed that "in real life, Miley and [he] needed to come back home", saying, "It was important for us to come back to where we are from and remember who we are." Once filming in Tennessee was settled, Cyrus was "overcome with a very positive emotion of coming back home" and wrote "Back to Tennessee" with the aid of songwriters Tamara Dunn and Matthew Wilder.

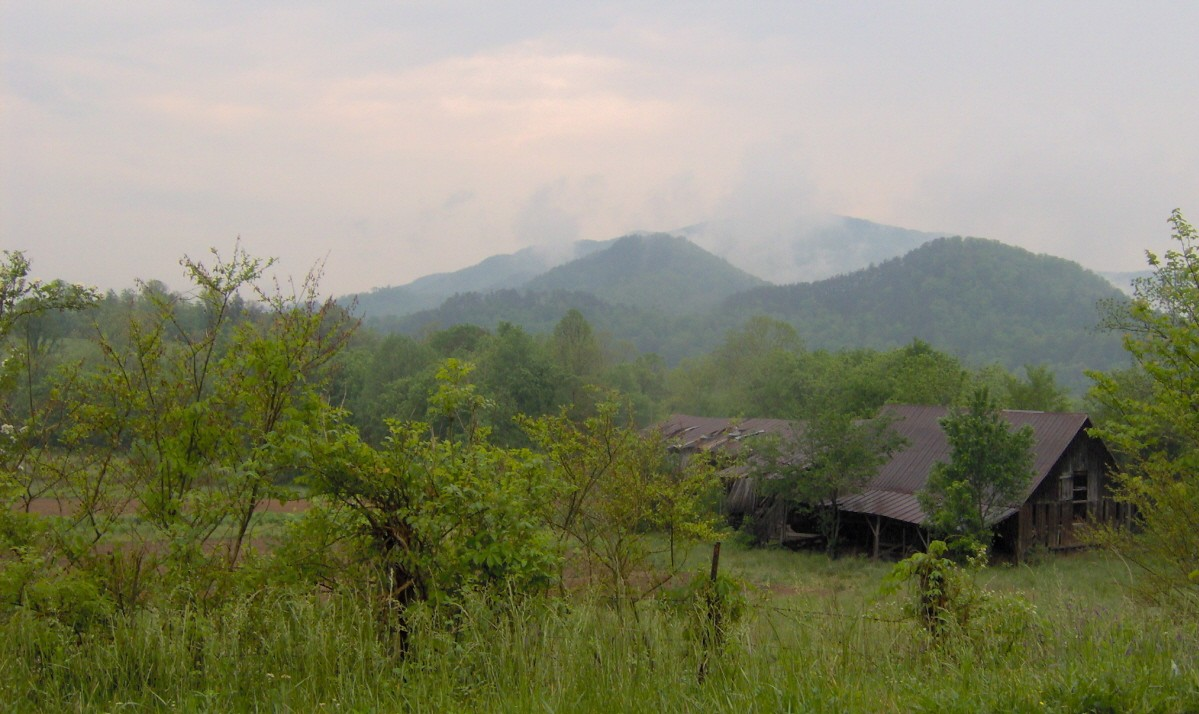
Cyrus was inspired by the simple Tennessee life to write the song.

Cyrus recorded "Back to Tennessee" for the film Hannah Montana: The Movie, in which his character performs the song at a fundraiser to save the meadows near his hometown from development. Cyrus says the song is "part of the cornerstone" of the film because it reflects the film's theme of escaping the fast-paced, glitzy world of Hollywood in search of a simpler country lifestyle. Cyrus commented,

"It's about remembering, you know, where you come from. It's always important to be aware of where you're at and always be looking to where you wanna go, but most importantly don't forget where you come from. That's 'Back to Tennessee' is all about [...] With me, I always try to keep it real with the music, you know. Line by line you listen to the song and you know that I'm walking the walk and talking the talk. It's what this song's all about. It definitely comes from the heart."

== Composition ==
Billy Ray Cyrus "Back to Tennessee" (2009)
A sample of Billy Ray Cyrus' "Back to Tennessee". The song is influenced by rock music while incorporating country music influences. Its lyrics discuss lamenting leaving Tennessee.

"Back to Tennessee" is one of the more rock music influenced tracks on Back to Tennessee. It is set in common time with a country rock tempo of 120 beats per minute. The song is written in the key of C major. The song has the following chord progression, C—C7—C.

Cyrus said of the lyrics, "If you download "Back to Tennessee" and listen to the whole song, you'll hear exactly how I felt after four years of Hannah Montana, and living in Los Angeles and giving up my previous life and existence and who I am and where I come from. You'll hear a guy who's immersed in music, and my love and desire and need to go back home." Jon Caramanica of The New York Times interpreted the song as an apology "both to [Cyrus's] teenage self and, by extension, to the daughter under his wing." Both Caramanica and Alison Stewart of The Washington Post took interest in the lines, "Great big town/So full of users". Caramanica said the line recognized that "fame is illusory" and "talk[ed] about some of his daughter’s famous friends", while Stewart interpreted the line as a description of Hollywood life in general.

== Critical reception ==
The song received generally positive reviews from critics. Shelly Fabian of About.com said, "There's a special quality to this single that might be able to help people get past 'that one song' from Billy Ray Cyrus's past and realize there's so much more to the man than something from two decades ago." While reviewing the Hannah Montana: The Movie soundtrack, Heather Phares of Allmusic said the song "fits in smoothly with an acoustic version of Rascal Flatts' witty 'Backwards'". Jon Caramanica of The New York Times said, "His hard-won insight is the next best thing to a good swaddle." Allison Stewart of The Washington Post described "Back to Tennessee" as a "fusillade of strident twang rock track". She added that the song was "eager" and that it explained "Country as Country Can Be". Yahoo! Music thought the song was followed Back to Tennessee's message "too literally". The song was included on the short list for Best Original Song at the 82nd Academy Awards, but failed to achieve a nomination.

== Chart performance ==
In the United States, "Back to Tennessee" failed to reach the Billboard Hot 100, the country's main singles chart, but charted on the country-genre chart. In the week ending March 7, 2009, "Back to Tennessee" debuted at number fifty-nine on Billboard's Hot Country Songs. "The Climb", by Cyrus' daughter, Miley Cyrus, debuted at number forty-eight the same week, the first time a father and daughter had separate charting songs on the chart since Johnny Cash and Rosanne Cash charted in 1990 with "Silver Stallion" and "One Step over the Line", respectively. On the week ending April 25, 2009, the song reached its peak at number forty-seven on the chart.

Chart (2009)	Peak position
US Hot Country Songs (Billboard)	47

== Music video ==
The music video for "Back to Tennessee" was directed by Declan Whitebloom and premiered on March 12, 2009 on CMT. It was partially shot in Malibu, California, where Cyrus wrote the song. Like the song, the video represents Cyrus' desire to return home. Cyrus explained,

"When I see the video for 'Back to Tennessee,' there's a lot of emotion there. It's a combination between the Hannah Montana movie and going back to the actual spot where I wrote the song. I wrote the song in Malibu, and we went back to Malibu to film the video. I had never done a video exactly where I wrote the song. Then we take my little blue truck from the movie and travel back across the country. Again, it becomes a very articulate picture of what that song's about. It's everything a video is supposed to be."

Cyrus during a sunset in a beach in the "Back to Tennessee" music video.

Cyrus's "little blue truck" is the blue 1990 Ford Ranger that he drove in the film, which was transported to California to be used in the video. The video prominently features clips of Hannah Montana: The Movie, particularly the scene in which Cyrus performs "Back to Tennessee". Cyrus's backup band in that performance includes part of Taylor Swift's band, Bucky Covington, and Marcel. About the video as a whole, Cyrus said, "I hope when people, you know, watch the video. I hope that they can feel what this song is about. I hope they can relate to that in their life and their world."

The video commences with the Hannah Montana: The Movie performance, in which Cyrus and his backup band perform atop a stage in a crowded barn. The video then switches to its principal setting, which features Cyrus on a beach at sunset. Cyrus is seen in a black T-shirt tossing rocks at the ocean and looking at a picture of a blond woman. The woman is portrayed by Melora Hardin, who plays Lorelai, Robby Ray's love interest in Hannah Montana: The Movie. As the video progresses, Cyrus is also seen with the blue Ford Ranger, either driving it or leaning against it while playing an acoustic guitar. The video also includes clips of Lorelai, Robby Ray, Miley Stewart, and Miley Stewart's love interest, Travis Body. The video ends with Cyrus, looking down, walking next to the seashore.

== Live performances ==
Cyrus performed "Back to Tennessee" as part of the AOL Sessions on April 13, 2009. He also performed the song and several others in a London Apple Store on April 24, 2009. The set, along with some songs by Miley, were recorded and sold exclusively by the United Kingdom iTunes Store as an extended play titled iTunes Live from London. On August 1, 2009, Cyrus performed the song at the 2009 Hannity Freedom Concert, a concert supporting the Freedom Alliance Scholarship Fund.
