= Based on a True Story (Will Smith album) =

2025 studio album by Will Smith

Studio album by Will Smith
- Released: March 28, 2025
- Genres: Hip-hop; gospel; pop rap
- Length: 37:08
- Label: Slang
- Producers: Angela Glenn; Ayo; Beau Nox; Chller; Days of 1993; FnZ; Angela Glenn; Chris Iaughlin; Joyner Lucas; Keanu; L'amo; Manuel Lara; LastNght; Leo Son; LeXoskeleton; Nato; OmArr; One Six; Javonte Pollard; Kyle Townsend; Jason White; Zach Ezzy

Will Smith chronology
Lost and Found (2005)	Based on a True Story (2025)

Singles from Based on a True Story
- 1. "You Can Make It" Released: June 28, 2024; 2. "Work of Art" Released: July 26, 2024; 3. "Tantrum" Released: December 13, 2024; 4. "Beautiful Scars" Released: January 30, 2025; 5. "First Love" Released: February 14, 2025

Based on a True Story (subtitled Season 1: Rave in the Wasteland) is the fifth studio album and first explicit album by American actor and rapper Will Smith. It was released on March 28, 2025, through Slang Recordings, marking Smith's return to music after 20 years since his 2005 album, Lost and Found. The album features collaborations with Big Sean, Russ, Joyner Lucas, and Smith's own son, Jaden, among others. Its release was preceded by the singles "Beautiful Scars" (with Big Sean), "Work of Art" (including contributions from both Russ and Jaden), and "Tantrum" (featuring Joyner Lucas). The album received mixed reviews.

== Background and promotion ==
Will Smith announced his fifth studio album, Based on a True Story, on Instagram, confirming its scheduled release for March 2025. Ahead of the album's launch, he introduced several singles, including the lead track, "Beautiful Scars", featuring rapper Big Sean, which debuted in late January 2025. The song's music video draws inspiration from the 1999 film The Matrix, with Smith portraying Neo—a role he previously turned down—while Big Sean appears as Morpheus. The video incorporates iconic elements from the film, such as the red and blue pill choice, symbolizing themes of self-reflection and personal growth.

In a July 2024 interview, Smith described the album as his most personal and impactful work, highlighting its central message of finding resilience in difficult times, encapsulated in the phrase "Dance in your darkest moments". Based on a True Story features multiple collaborations. Smith's return to music has generated considerable attention, particularly given his short hiatus from the industry following the Oscars 2022 slapping incident. Smith also attended the 67th Annual Grammy Awards on February 2, 2025, marking his first major awards show appearance since the slapping incident.

== Musical style ==
Based on a True Story is primarily a hip-hop and gospel album, featuring a "richer, more emotionally layered" take on Smith's established pop rap sound. This includes Smith's flow, which resembles his previous albums in the opening skit "Int. Barbershop – Day" but is closer to the contemporary rappers Drake, Rick Ross, and Migos in the song "You Lookin' for Me?".

== Critical reception ==
Professional ratings
Aggregate scores
Source	Rating
Metacritic	40/100
Review scores
Source	Rating
The Arts Desk	1/5 stars
Clash	3/10
The Independent	2/5 stars
The Line of Best Fit	4/10
musicOMH	2/5 stars
Pitchfork	2.4/10
RapReviews	5.5/10
Rolling Stone	2.5/5 stars
The Scotsman	3/5 stars
The Times	2/5 stars

Based on a True Story received mostly mixed reviews from critics. On Metacritic, which assigns a normalized rating out of 100 to reviews from mainstream critics, the album received an average score of 40, based on 8 reviews, which indicates "mixed or average" reviews.

Tara Joshi of The Independent awarded the album 2 out of 5 stars, and felt it lacked innovation: "It seems fair for Smith to want to exorcise the past few years, unpacking his perceived mistreatment by both the press and the public. It's just a shame that he's chosen to do it with quasi-inspirational songs that lack energy."

Similarly, Clash writer Robin Murray rated the project 3 out of 10, describing it as superficial: "An often-insubstantial record, Based on a True Story doesn't offer much beyond surface-level engagement. If Will Smith aimed to candidly express his emotions, the album misses the mark; instead, it comes across as a disjointed and ineffective endeavor."

Writing for Pitchfork, Stephen Kearse stated that Based on a True Story is a stunt of sorts, it "lacks the easy repose of an artist in their comfort zone, or the playfulness of one cutting loose in their sanctum. It is a campaign platform, devoid of perspective or style, uninterested in narrative or even spin, but always on message: Please take me back."

== Commercial performance ==
Based on a True Story was the first album from Smith that failed to chart in any major territory. In the UK, the album did not appear on the UK Albums Chart, although it did chart for one week at number 79 on the UK Album Downloads Chart. Media reports noted that this chart placement was a result of 36 digital downloads in the album's first week of release.

== Track listing ==
Based on a True Story track listing
No.	Title	Writer(s)	Producer(s)	Length
1.	"Int. Barbershop – Day" (featuring DJ Jazzy Jeff and B. Simone)	Willard Smith; Christian Astrop; Drew Gavin; Omarr Rambert; Justin Scott	Lexoskeleton; OmArr	1:55
2.	"You Lookin' for Me?"	W. Smith; Larus Arnarson; Gavin; Michael McHenry; LastNght; Rambert	Days of 1993; LastNght; OmArr	2:19
3.	"The Reverend (Rave Sermon)"	Kevin Teasley; Matthew T. Wiggers	OmArr	1:26
4.	"Rave in the Wasteland"	W. Smith; Gavin; L'amo; LastNght; Rambert	Kyle Townsend; L'amo; LastNght; OmArr	2:37
5.	"Bulletproof" (featuring Jac Ross)		Beau Nox; Townsend; Manuel Lara; OmArr; Zach Ezzy	2:56
6.	"Hard Times (Smile)" (featuring Teyana Taylor)	W. Smith; Gavin; Lexoskeleton; Rambert	Lexoskeleton; OmArr	3:31
7.	"Beautiful Scars" (with Big Sean featuring OBanga)	W. Smith; Sean Anderson; Chllr; Lexoskeleton; OmArr	Lexoskeleton; OmArr	3:46
8.	"Tantrum" (featuring Joyner Lucas)	W. Smith; Gary Maurice Lucas; Leo Son	Lucas; Leo Son	3:04
9.	"First Love" (with India Martínez and Marcin)	W. Smith; India Martínez; LastNght; Rambert; Townsend	Townsend; LastNght; OmArr	3:18
10.	"Make It Look Easy"	W. Smith; Gavin; Lexoskeleton; Rambert	Lexoskeleton; OmArr	3:31
11.	"The Reverend (YCMI Sermon)"	W. Smith; Brian Joseph; Rambert; Teasley	OmArr	0:52
12.	"You Can Make It" (with Fridayy and Sunday Service Choir)	W. Smith; Alejandro Borrero; Isaac de Boni; Gavin; Manuel Lara; Francis Leblanc; Michael Mulé; Ivanni Rodríguez; Rambert; Keanu Torres	Angela Glenn; Ayo; Chller; FnZ; Jason White; Javonte Pollard; Keanu; Lara; OmArr; One Six; Nato; Chris Iaughlin	3:41
13.	"Work of Art" (with Russ featuring Jaden)	W. Smith; Astrop; Gavin; Rambert; Scott; Jaden Smith; Russell Vitale	Beau Nox; Lexoskeleton; OmArr	3:25
14.	"The Reverend (WOA Sermon)"		OmArr	0:46
Total length:				37:10

== Personnel ==
=== Musicians ===
- Will Smith – vocals
- Marcin – guitar (track 9)
- Mason Sacks – guitar (track 9)
- Joyner Lucas – vocals (track 8)
- Alex Rozo – vocals (track 9)
- Briseyda Zarate – vocals (track 9)
- Cristina Lucio – vocals (track 9)
- Vanessa Albalos – vocals (track 9)
- Francis Leblanc – vocals (track 12)
- Aja Grant – vocals (track 12)
- Alex Jacke – vocals (track 12)
- Alex Simone – vocals (track 12)
- Ashley Echols – vocals (track 12)
- Ashly Williams – vocals (track 12)
- Bijan Slack – vocals (track 12)
- Chara Hammonds – vocals (track 12)
- Chelsea "BriJolie" Miller – vocals (track 12)
- Claudia Cunningham – vocals (track 12)
- Dwanna Orange – vocals (track 12)
- Eric Lyn – vocals (track 12)
- Fallynn Rian – vocals (track 12)
- George Lovett – vocals (track 12)
- Jasmine Rose Patton – vocals (track 12)
- Jason White – vocals (track 12)
- JeRonelle McGhee – vocals (track 12)
- Jerel Duren – vocals (track 12)
- Joel Quinn – vocals (track 12)
- Kimberly Johnson – vocals (track 12)
- Lanita Smith – vocals (track 12)
- Porsche Clay – vocals (track 12)
- Jaden Smith – vocals (track 13)
- Russell Vitae – vocals (track 13)

=== Technical ===
- Colin Leonard – mastering (tracks 1–6, 9, 10, 14)
- Nicholas De Porcel – mastering (track 12)
- Stan Greene – mixing (tracks 1, 2, 9)
- Federico Giordano – mixing (tracks 3–6, 10)
- Patrizio "Teezio" Pigliapoco – mixing (tracks 3–6, 10)
- Leo Son – mixing, engineering (track 8)
- Nato – mixing (tracks 11, 14), engineering (1, 2, 4–6, 8–10, 12)
- Brandon Blatz – mixing (track 12)
- Derek "MixedByAli" Ali – mixing (track 12)
- Chris Kahn – engineering (tracks 1–6, 11, 14)
- Berenice Gonzalo – engineering (tracks 1, 2, 4, 5, 9, 10)
- Adam "Yukon" Harr – engineering (tracks 4–6)

== Charts ==
Chart performance for Based on a True Story
Chart (2025)	Peak position
UK Album Downloads (Official Charts)	79
