= Switch (Will Smith song) =

2005 single by Will Smith

Single by Will Smith

from the album Lost and Found
- Released: February 14, 2005
- Studio: The Boom Boom Room (Los Angeles); The Cutting Room (New York City)
- Genre: Pop rap; reggae
- Length: 3:16
- Label: Interscope; Overbrook
- Songwriters: Willard Smith; Kwamé Holland; Lennie Bennett
- Producers: Kwame "K1 Mil"; O. Banga (vocals)

Will Smith singles chronology
| "1000 Kisses" (2002) | "Switch" (2005) | "Party Starter" (2005) |

"Switch" is a song by American actor and rapper Will Smith. It was released on February 14, 2005, as the first single from his fourth studio album, Lost and Found (2005), via Interscope Records. Smith co-wrote the song with Kwame "K1 Mil", who also produced the track, and Lennie Bennett. Upon its release, "Switch" topped the Australian Singles Chart, peaked at number seven on the US Billboard Hot 100, and became a top-10 hit in several other countries.

== Critical reception ==
"Switch" received mostly positive reviews, with critics identifying the song as a bright spot on Lost and Found. Gazette and Herald writer Alex Lawless called it a "proper party track" that combines pop rap and reggae. IGN writer Todd Gilchrist praised the song's "uptempo throwdown" as returning some of Smith's "former glory" and being one of the better hip-hop singles of the time. Asheville Citizen-Times writer Edna Gundersen described the song as a "funk-lite dance track" that plays to Smith's strengths as a family-friendly pop rapper, similar to Pittsburgh Post-Gazette writer Scott Mervis calling it a "clickety-clack dance single."

== Commercial performance ==
"Switch" was Smith's highest-charting single from Lost and Found. On the chart dated April 16, 2005, the song peaked at number one on the Billboard Hot Digital Songs chart, selling 40,000 digital copies. The song peaked at number seven on the Billboard Hot 100, becoming Smith's third and last Hot 100 top 10 hit. It reached number one in Australia, where it remained for one week, and number four in the United Kingdom.

== Live performances ==
Smith performed "Switch" live at the 2005 Kids' Choice Awards with former JammX Kids members Alyson Stoner and Monica Parales as his backup dancers, at San Antonio before Game 1 of the 2005 NBA Finals between the Detroit Pistons and the San Antonio Spurs, on BET's 106 & Park, and at the Live 8 concert in Philadelphia.

== Track listings ==
UK and Australian CD single

1. "Switch" – 3:17
2. "Switch" (main RnB remix) – 3:47 (3:46 in Australia)
3. "Switch" (instrumental RnB remix) – 3:48
4. "Switch" (video) – 3:30

European CD single

1. "Switch" – 3:17
2. "Switch" (main RnB remix) – 3:46

European maxi-CD single

1. "Switch" – 3:17
2. "Switch" (main RnB remix) – 3:46
3. "Switch" (instrumental RnB remix) – 3:48

Digital download

1. "Switch" – 3:16

Digital download – Remix

1. "Switch" (R&B remix) (duet with Robin Thicke) – 3:46

== Credits and personnel ==
Credits are lifted from the Australian CD single liner notes.

Studios

- Recorded at the Boom Boom Room (Los Angeles, California, US) and the Cutting Room Studios (New York City)
- Mixed at the Boom Boom Room (Los Angeles, California, US)

Personnel

- Will Smith – writing (as Willard Smith), vocals
- Kwamé Holland – writing, production (as Kwame "K Mil")
- Lennie Bennett – writing
- O. Banga – vocal production
- Pete Novak, Dylan Margerum – recording engineers
- Kevin (KD) Davis – mixing

== Charts ==
=== Weekly charts ===
| Chart (2005) | Peak position |
|---|---|
| Australia (ARIA) | 1 |
| Australian Urban (ARIA) | 1 |
| Austria (Ö3 Austria Top 40) | 7 |
| Belgium (Ultratop 50 Flanders) | 2 |
| Belgium (Ultratop 50 Wallonia) | 14 |
| Canada CHR/Pop Top 30 (Radio & Records) | 4 |
| Canada Hot AC Top 30 (Radio & Records) | 25 |
| Denmark (Tracklisten) | 14 |
| Europe (Eurochart Hot 100) | 4 |
| Germany (GfK) | 4 |
| Greece (IFPI) | 38 |
| Hungary (Rádiós Top 40) | 34 |
| Hungary (Dance Top 40) | 11 |
| Ireland (IRMA) | 4 |
| Italy (FIMI) | 8 |
| Netherlands (Dutch Top 40) | 4 |
| Netherlands (Single Top 100) | 3 |
| New Zealand (Recorded Music NZ) | 3 |
| Scottish Singles Sales (Official Charts) | 4 |
| Switzerland (Schweizer Hitparade) | 13 |
| UK Singles (Official Charts) | 4 |
| UK Hip Hop/R&B (Official Charts) | 2 |
| US Billboard Hot 100 | 7 |
| US Adult Pop Airplay (Billboard) | 40 |
| US Pop Airplay (Billboard) | 4 |

=== Year-end charts ===
| Chart (2005) | Position |
|---|---|
| Australia (ARIA) | 6 |
| Australian Urban (ARIA) | 4 |
| Austria (Ö3 Austria Top 40) | 56 |
| Belgium (Ultratop 50 Flanders) | 17 |
| Belgium (Ultratop 50 Wallonia) | 62 |
| Europe (Eurochart Hot 100) | 36 |
| Germany (Media Control GfK) | 40 |
| Ireland (IRMA) | 20 |
| Netherlands (Dutch Top 40) | 23 |
| Netherlands (Single Top 100) | 39 |
| New Zealand (RIANZ) | 8 |
| Romania (Romanian Top 100) | 17 |
| Switzerland (Schweizer Hitparade) | 49 |
| UK Singles (OCC) | 15 |
| US Billboard Hot 100 | 28 |
| US Mainstream Top 40 (Billboard) | 17 |

=== Decade-end charts ===
| Chart (2000–2009) | Position |
|---|---|
| Australia (ARIA) | 98 |

== Certifications ==
| Region | Certification | Certified units/sales |
|---|---|---|
| Australia (ARIA) | Platinum | 70,000^{^} |
| New Zealand (RMNZ) | Platinum | 30,000^{‡} |
| United Kingdom (BPI) | Gold | 400,000^{‡} |
| United States (RIAA) | Gold | 500,000^{*} |
^{*} Sales figures based on certification alone.^{^} Shipments figures based on certification alone.^{‡} Sales+streaming figures based on certification alone.

== Release history ==
| Region | Date | Format(s) | Label(s) | Ref. |
|---|---|---|---|---|
| United States | February 14, 2005 | Rhythmic contemporary; contemporary hit radio | Interscope; Overbrook | |
| United States | February 15, 2005 | Digital download | Interscope; Overbrook | |
| United States | February 28, 2005 | Urban radio | Interscope; Overbrook | |
| Australia | March 14, 2005 | CD | Interscope; Overbrook | |
| United States | March 15, 2005 | Digital download (remix) | Interscope; Overbrook | |
| United Kingdom | March 21, 2005 | CD | Interscope; Overbrook | |

== See also ==
- List of number-one singles of 2005 (Australia)
- List of UK R&B Singles Chart number ones of 2005
- List of Billboard Hot 100 top-ten singles in 2005
- List of number-one Billboard Hot Digital Songs of 2005
