= Somebody Said a Prayer =

Single by Billy Ray Cyrus

from the album Back to Tennessee
- Released: August 16, 2008
- Genre: Country
- Length: 4:08
- Label: Lyric Street
- Songwriters: Craig Wiseman, Neil Thrasher
- Producer: Mark Bright

Billy Ray Cyrus singles chronology
"Ready, Set, Don't Go" (2007)	"Somebody Said a Prayer" (2008)	"Back to Tennessee" (2009)

Music video
- "Somebody Said a Prayer" at CMT.com

"Somebody Said a Prayer" is a song written by Neil Thrasher and Craig Wiseman, and recorded by American country music artist Billy Ray Cyrus. It was released in August 2008 as the first single from the album Back to Tennessee. The song first charted on the Billboard Hot Country Songs chart at number 53 for the chart week of August 16, 2008. "Somebody Said a Prayer" was also made into a music video with a cameo from Cyrus' son, Trace Cyrus.

== Content ==
The song is a mid-tempo detailing two people — a mother in the first verse, and a teenager in the second verse — both of whom are dealing with stress in their lives. The mother in the first verse "almost let her job, her kids, her mind, her life go up in smoke" and the teen-ager attempted suicide by taking a bottle of pills. Both characters, however, find their lives improved (the mother is now "laughin' and lovin' and content", and the teenager is now seen every week by the narrator). According to the chorus, the two characters' lives were improved because of prayer.

The song features backing from a piano and a string section.

== Critical reception ==
Roughstock.com described the song favorably, saying "'Somebody Said a Prayer' finds Cyrus soaring vocally while the layered production backs him up. Fans of softer country production may not like the 'bombastic' elements of this song all that much because it seems as if it is overshadowing or [competing with] Billy Ray but it's a technique that's been used in pop/ Christian markets for ages… The lyrics are heartfelt and are right on par… If Billy Ray Cyrus was looking at sustaining his music career with 'Somebody Said A Prayer', Billy Ray has certainly delivered a song that will do just that."

== Music video ==
The music video for "Somebody Said a Prayer" first premiered in September 2008. The video was directed by award-winning director, Roman White. It also has a cameo from Cyrus' son, Metro Station lead-singer, Trace Cyrus. The video focuses around a grieving widow, her teenaged son, and her little girl, who are crushed by the death of her husband. Her little boy walks through the house to his room, after seeing his mother and siblings distraught, and kneels beside his bed to say a prayer. The prayer lifts the spirits of his family, and they join him in his room.

In September 2009, the video was nominated for the Gospel Music Channel's Music Video Awards.

== Chart performance ==
"Somebody Said a Prayer" debuted at number 53 on the Billboard Hot Country Songs chart. In September 2008, the song become Cyrus' fifteenth Top 40 single on the country charts. It reached a peak of number 33 on the week of November 15, 2008, giving Cyrus his first solo Top 40 single since "You Won't Be Lonely" reached number 17 in 2000.

Chart (2008)	Peak position
US Hot Country Songs (Billboard)	33
