= It Won't Be the Last =

Studio album by Billy Ray Cyrus
- Released: June 22, 1993
- Studios: Music Mill (Nashville, Tennessee)
- Genre: Country
- Length: 38:20
- Label: Mercury
- Producers: Joe Scaife; Jim Cotton

Billy Ray Cyrus chronology
Some Gave All (1992)	It Won't Be the Last (1993)	Storm in the Heartland (1994)

Singles from It Won't Be the Last
- 1. "In the Heart of a Woman" Released: June 29, 1993; 2. "Somebody New" Released: September 18, 1993; 3. "Words by Heart" Released: January 24, 1994; 4. "Talk Some" Released: 1994

Professional ratings
Review scores
Source	Rating
AllMusic	2/5 stars
Entertainment Weekly	C
Music Week	2/5 stars
Rolling Stone	3/5 stars

It Won't Be the Last is the second studio album by American country music artist Billy Ray Cyrus. Certified Platinum in just under a year after release by the RIAA, the album has sold over 1 million copies in the US and over 3 million copies worldwide. This album produced four singles for Cyrus on the Hot Country Songs charts: "In the Heart of a Woman", "Somebody New", "Words by Heart" and "Talk Some", which reached number #3, number #9, number #12, and number #63, respectively, on the charts. The first, third and fourth singles, plus two album cuts ("Ain't Your Dog No More" and "When I'm Gone") had accompanying music videos. "Somebody New" was covered in 2008 by Jill King, whose version was released as a single, however, it did not chart.

== Track listing ==
No.	Title	Writer(s)	Length
1.	"In the Heart of a Woman"	Keith Hinton; Brett Cartwright	4:00
2.	"Talk Some"	Don Von Tress	4:15
3.	"Somebody New"	Alex Harvey; Mike Curtis	3:45
4.	"Only Time Will Tell"	Billy Ray Cyrus; Greg Fletcher	3:21
5.	"Ain't Your Dog No More"	Von Tress	2:28
6.	"Words by Heart"	Reed Nielsen; Monty Powell	3:07
7.	"It Won't Be the Last"	Cyrus; Terry Shelton	3:49
8.	"Throwin' Stones"	Cyrus	3:40
9.	"Right Face Wrong Time"	Cyrus	3:27
10.	"Dreamin' in Color, Livin' in Black and White"	Von Tress; Donny Lowery	4:17
11.	"When I'm Gone"	Cyrus; Von Tress	3:01

== Personnel ==
Adapted credits from the media notes of It Won't Be the Last.

Sly Dog

- Billy Ray Cyrus – lead vocals, rhythm guitar
- Greg Fletcher – drums, percussion, backing vocals
- Corky Holbrook – bass guitar, backing vocals
- Michael J. Sagraves – acoustic guitar, electric guitar, pedal steel guitar, harmonica, backing vocals
- Terry Shelton – lead guitar, backing vocals
- Barton Stevens – keyboards, backing vocals

Additional Musicians

- Mike Brignardello – bass guitar
- Clyde Carr – backing vocals
- Costo Davis – keyboards
- Sonny Garrish – steel guitar
- Keith D. Hinton – acoustic and electric guitars
- Roy Huskey, Jr. – upright bass
- Mike Lawler – keyboards
- Neal Matthews – backing vocals
- Joe Scaife – backing vocals
- Gordon Stoker – backing vocals
- Don Von Tress – acoustic, electric and bass guitars, backing vocals
- Ray C. Walker – backing vocals
- Duane West – backing vocals

Production

- Joe Scaife – co-producer, mixing
- Jim Cotton – co-producer, mixing
- Grahame Smith – assistant engineer
- Clyde Carr – assistant engineer
- Todd Culross – assistant engineer
- Hank Williams – mastering (MasterMix)
- Ronnie Thomas – digital editing

Artwork

- Kim Markovchick – executive art direction
- Virginia Team – art direction
- Jerry Joyner – design
- Peter Nash – photography

== Charts ==
=== Weekly charts ===
Chart (1993)	Peak position
Australian Albums (ARIA)	20
Canadian Albums (RPM)	11
Canadian Country Albums (RPM)	1
Dutch Albums (Album Top 100)	86
New Zealand Albums (RMNZ)	43
Norwegian Albums (VG-lista)	18
Swedish Albums (Sverigetopplistan)	33
Swiss Albums (Schweizer Hitparade)	27
US Billboard 200	3
US Top Country Albums (Billboard)	1

=== Year-end charts ===
Chart (1993)	Position
Canada Top Albums/CDs (RPM)	69
US Billboard 200	73
US Top Country Albums (Billboard)	16
Chart (1994)	Position
US Top Country Albums (Billboard)	45

=== Singles ===
Year	Single	Peak chart positions		
Year	Single	US Country	US	CAN Country
1993	"In the Heart of a Woman"	3	76	1
1993	"Somebody New"	9	104	14
1994	"Words by Heart"	12	119	14
1994	"Talk Some"	63	—	—
"—" denotes releases that failed to chart

== Certifications ==
Region	Certification	Certified units/sales
Canada (Music Canada)	2× Platinum	200,000^{^}
United States (RIAA)	Platinum	1,000,000^{^}
^{^} Shipments figures based on certification alone.
