= Jill King =

American country singer (born 1973)

- Born: Jill Christine King; April 2, 1973 (age 53)
- Origin: Arab, Alabama, United States
- Genres: Country
- Occupation: Singer-songwriter
- Instruments: Vocals acoustic guitar
- Years active: 2003–present
- Labels: Blue Diamond, Foundher
- Website: www.jillking.com

Jill Christine King (born April 2, 1973, in Arab, Alabama) is an American country music artist. A graduate of Vanderbilt University, she spent several years in Nashville, Tennessee, before being discovered at Tootsie's Orchid Lounge, a popular venue for singer-songwriters in Nashville.

In 2003, she released her debut album, Jillbilly, on the independent Blue Diamond label. The album's first and third singles both entered Billboard Hot Country Singles & Tracks (now Hot Country Songs) charts. Several of her singles have also charted on the independent Music Row music charts as well. Her 2008 single "Somebody New" is a cover of a song previously recorded by Billy Ray Cyrus.

King founded her own label, Foundher Records, in 2010. She released her third album, Rain on Fire, that same year.

== Discography ==
=== Albums ===
Title	Album details
Jillbilly	Release date: March 18, 2003; Label: Blue Diamond
Somebody New	Release date: June 3, 2008; Label: Blue Diamond
Rain On Fire	Release date: April 6, 2010; Label: Foundher

=== Singles ===
Year	Single	Peak positions	Album
Year	Single	US Country	Album
2003	"One Mississippi"	60	Jillbilly
2003	"Hand Me Down Heartache"	—	Jillbilly
2004	"98.6 Degrees and Falling"	56	Jillbilly
2004	"Three Months, Two Weeks, One Day"	—	Jillbilly
2005	"Makes Perfect Sense to Me"	—	Jillbilly
2008	"Somebody New"	—	Somebody New
"—" denotes releases that did not chart

=== Music videos ===
Year	Video	Director
2003	"One Mississippi"	Tom Bevins
