= The Dukes of Hazzard (film soundtrack) =

The Dukes of Hazzard: Music from the Motion Picture

Soundtrack album by various artists
- Released: July 19, 2005
- Genre: Southern rock
- Length: 48:19
- Label: Columbia

Singles from The Dukes of Hazzard: Music from the Motion Picture
- 1. "These Boots Are Made for Walkin'" Released: June 20, 2005

The Dukes of Hazzard: Music from the Motion Picture is the soundtrack album for the 2005 film The Dukes of Hazzard. Released by Columbia Records on July 19, 2005, it is a compilation of mostly Southern rock songs. The soundtrack also includes Willie Nelson's cover of Waylon Jennings's "Good Ol' Boys" and Jessica Simpson's cover of Nancy Sinatra's "These Boots Are Made for Walkin'", the latter of which was released a single.

== Background and release ==
In February 2005, Jessica Simpson revealed to MTV News that she wanted to collaborate with Willie Nelson, her co-star in the film The Dukes of Hazzard for its soundtrack. The following month, the Chicago Tribune reported that Simpson had recorded a version of Nancy Sinatra's "These Boots Are Made for Walkin'" for the soundtrack. Columbia Records sent Simpson's version to contemporary hit radio on June 20. On June 28, the label revealed the track list of the soundtrack. The Dukes of Hazzard: Music from the Motion Picture was released on July 19 by Columbia.

== Critical reception ==
Professional ratings
Review scores
Source	Rating
The Buffalo News	2/4 stars
Entertainment Weekly	B+
Miami Herald	2.5/5 stars
The Post and Courier	B+
San Francisco Chronicle	2/5 stars
Times Record News	B–

Devin Grant of The Post and Courier called the soundtrack "a fairly entertaining compilation of classic Southern rock tracks from the last three decades or so". In a review for Entertainment Weekly, Leah Greenblatt wrote that "Dukes waves its red-state flag high and proud". Miyoko Ohtake from The Buffalo News recommended the album for "a country line-dancing party". Ben Kreider, writing for The Star Press, thought that while the soundtrack is "a nice mix", Jennings's version of "Good Ol' Boys" should have been included as well. Billboard columnist Katy Kroll thought that Nelson's and Simpson's covers were not suitable for the soundtrack. The San Francisco Chronicle's Aidin Vaziri called it a "train-wreck compilation" and believed that no rock fan would purchase the album.

Writing for the Miami Herald, Howard Cohen argued that the Southern rock songs "more than make up for misfires" by Nelson's and Simpson's covers. Don Chance from Times Record News, AllMusic's Johnny Loftus, and Chuck Eddy of The Village Voice appreciated the soundtrack, but believed that Simpson's cover was out of place.

== Commercial performance ==
The Dukes of Hazzard: Music from the Motion Picture debuted at number 33 on the Billboard 200 with first-week sales of 27,000 copies. The soundtrack also entered the US Top Soundtracks chart at number 2.

== Track listing ==
The Dukes of Hazzard: Music from the Motion Picture track listing
No.	Title	Writer(s)	Length
1.	"Uncle Jesse Tells a Joke" (Willie Nelson)		0:10
2.	"These Boots Are Made for Walkin'" (Jessica Simpson)	Lee Hazlewood	3:59
3.	"One Way Out" (The Allman Brothers Band)	Elmore James; Marshall Sehorn	4:56
4.	"Pride and Joy" (Stevie Ray Vaughan and Double Trouble)	Stevie Ray Vaughan	3:39
5.	"Call Me the Breeze" (Lynyrd Skynyrd)	John Cale	5:07
6.	"The South's Gonna Do It Again" (The Charlie Daniels Band)	Charlie Daniels	3:57
7.	"Flirtin' with Disaster" (Molly Hatchet)	Danny Joe Brown; Banner Thomas	4:58
8.	"Hillbilly Shoes" (Montgomery Gentry)	Mike Geiger; Woody Mullis; Bobby Taylor	3:12
9.	"Black Betty" (Ram Jam)	Huddie Ledbetter	3:56
10.	"Soul City" (Southern Culture on the Skids)	Rick Miller	2:35
11.	"Change My Mind" (The Blueskins)	The Blueskins	2:30
12.	"Burn It Off" (The Jon Spencer Blues Explosion)	Judah Bauer; Russell Simins; Jon Spencer	2:53
13.	"Funk #49" (James Gang)	Dale Peters; Joe Walsh	3:50
14.	"Good Ol' Boys" (Nelson)	Waylon Jennings	2:26
15.	"Uncle Jesse Tells Another Joke" (Nelson)		0:11
Total length:			48:19

== Charts ==
Chart performance for The Dukes of Hazzard: Music from the Motion Picture
Chart (2005)	Peak position
US Billboard 200	33
US Top Soundtracks (Billboard)	2

== Release history ==
Release history and formats for The Dukes of Hazzard: Music from the Motion Picture
Region	Date	Format(s)	Label(s)	Ref.
United States	July 19, 2005	CD	Columbia	
United States	July 19, 2005	Digital download; streaming	Sony BMG	
