= Lost and Found (Will Smith album) =

Studio album by Will Smith
- Released: March 29, 2005
- Recorded: 2004–2005
- Studios: The Boom Boom Room (Burbank, California); The Studio (Philadelphia, Pennsylvania); The Cutting Room (New York City, New York); 1020 Sound (Philadelphia, Pennsylvania); Crescent Moon (Miami, Florida)
- Genres: Hip-hop; pop rap
- Length: 55:05
- Labels: Overbrook; Interscope
- Producers: Omarr "O. Banga" Rambert (exec.); The Freshmen; Treezah; Hotrunner; DJ Jazzy Jeff; Polow da Don; Kwamé; Jae Staxx; JYP; G1; DJ Twinz; Eleet Beats; Cory "Co P!" Peterson; Mike Hype; Tony Dofat

Will Smith chronology
| Greatest Hits (2002) | Lost and Found (2005) | Based on a True Story (2025) |

Singles from Lost and Found
- 1. "Switch" Released: February 15, 2005; 2. "Party Starter" Released: August 2, 2005

Lost and Found is the fourth studio album by American actor and rapper Will Smith. It was released on March 29, 2005, by his production company Overbrook Entertainment and Interscope Records. The album reached number six on the US Billboard 200 and was certified Gold by the Recording Industry Association of America, making this Smith's third overall top ten album following Willennium in 1999 and his second gold-selling album following Born to Reign in 2002. The album also reached the top 20 on the UK Albums Chart. "Switch" and "Party Starter" were released as singles. This would be Smith's last album in twenty years before he returned to music in 2025 with Based on a True Story.

== Recording and production ==
The majority of recording for Lost and Found took place at The Boom Boom Room in Burbank, California, with additional sessions at The Studio in Philadelphia, Pennsylvania, The Cutting Room in New York City, New York, 1020 Sound Studios in Philadelphia, and Crescent Moon Studios in Miami, Florida. Almost all songs on the album were produced or co-produced by The Freshmen, or individual member Troy "Treezah" Johnson, with executive producer Omarr "O. Banga" Rambert producing much of Smith's vocals; DJ Jazzy Jeff, Kwamé, and more also contributed to production.

== Composition and lyrics ==
Lost and Found has been described as "Will Smith's angry album," combining his established pop rap sound with edgier hip-hop. USA Today writer Edna Gunderson noted that its songs mainly fall under two categories: "party fare" and "solemn musing."

AllMusic writer Andy Kellman claimed that the lyrics on Lost and Found contribute to "the least party-oriented album Smith has made", blaming the poor sales performance of previous album Born to Reign and criticism by other rappers and radio personalities for making Smith "a little bitter". PopMatters writer Mike Schiller identifies a similar tone on the album, noting that Smith is "surprisingly confrontational" on much of the record targeting subjects such as rap radio and other hip hop artists. Rolling Stone writer Christian Hoard noted that the lyrics on the album feature "lots of self-deprecating humor".

== Promotion and release ==
The release of Lost and Found was preceded by the single "Switch" in February 2005, which gave Smith his first US Billboard Hot 100 top 10 since "Wild Wild West" in 1999. "Switch" was also successful internationally, reaching the top 10 on a number of regional charts including the UK Singles Chart. "Party Starter" was the second and final single released from the album, reaching the top 20 in the UK.

== Critical reception ==
Professional ratings
Aggregate scores
| Source | Rating |
|---|---|
| Metacritic | 50/100 |
Review scores
| Source | Rating |
| AllMusic | 3/5 stars |
| Blender | 2/5 stars |
| E! | C |
| Entertainment Weekly | B+ |
| The Guardian | 2/5 stars |
| IGN | 7.5/10 |
| NOW | 3/5 stars |
| RapReviews | 8/10 |
| PopMatters | 7/10 |
| Rolling Stone | 2/5 stars |

Media response to Lost and Found was mixed; review aggregator website Metacritic reports a normalized rating of 50, based on 10 critical reviews, indicating "Mixed or average" reviews. Entertainment Weekly awarded the album a B+ rating, describing it as "packed with the sort of undeniable pleasures only the most churlish thug could deny". Andy Kellman of AllMusic described it as "an entertaining and thoughtful album for young kids and their parents to listen to and talk about", while PopMatters' Mike Schiller praised Lost and Found as a return to form for Smith, but noted that his audience had likely dwindled by the time of the album's release.

Christian Hoard of Rolling Stone noted that while the album features "plenty of up-to-date beats", Lost and Found is let down by the fact that Smith does not have "a commanding presence" on many of the songs, which Hoard claimed made the rapper "utterly unconvincing" and "fast running out of steam". A review in The Guardian simply concluded that "[Smith's] decision to stray from his usual blend of impish party tunes and extended jingles for the latest summer blockbuster constitutes one of the most ill-advised career moves since MC Hammer went gangsta". Greg Tate of The Village Voice dubbed Lost and Found "the lamest album that'll be released this year", describing Smith's style as "imitation hip-hop".

== Commercial performance ==
Lost and Found debuted at number six on the US Billboard 200, selling 98,000 copies in its first week. The album reached number four on the Billboard Top R&B/Hip-Hop Albums chart. Outside of the US, it reached number 15 on the UK Albums Chart, and also reached the top 20 in Germany.

== Track listing ==
| No. | Title | Writer(s) | Producer(s) | Length |
|---|---|---|---|---|
| 1. | "Here He Comes" (performed by DJ Jazzy Jeff & the Fresh Prince) | Will Smith; Troy Johnson; Jeff Townes; J. Robert Harris; Paul Francis Webster | DJ Jazzy Jeff; The Freshmen^{[a]} | 2:20 |
| 2. | "Party Starter" | Smith; Christopher Bridges; Jamal Jones | Polow da Don; Treezah^{[a]}; O. Banga^{[b]} | 4:09 |
| 3. | "Switch" | Smith; Kwamé Holland; Lennie Bennett | Kwamé; Banga^{[b]} | 3:17 |
| 4. | "Mr. Niceguy" | Smith; Johnson | The Freshmen | 2:21 |
| 5. | "Ms. Holy Roller" | Smith; Johnson; Antônio Pinto; Ed Cortes | The Freshmen | 3:39 |
| 6. | "Lost & Found" | Smith; Johnson; Ronald Jackson; D. Lewis | The Freshmen; Banga^{[b]} | 4:16 |
| 7. | "Tell Me Why" (featuring Mary J. Blige) | Smith; Armique Wyche; Johnson | Jae Staxx; Banga | 4:29 |
| 8. | "I Wish I Made That/Swagga" | "I Wish I Made That": Smith; Johnson; "Swagga": Smith; Johnson; Jackson; Omarr Rambert; Bennett | "I Wish I Made That": The Freshmen; JYP^{[a]}; "Swagga": The Freshmen; Banga^{[b]} | 4:16 |
| 9. | "Pump Ya Brakes" (featuring Snoop Dogg) | Smith; Rambert; Calvin Broadus; Bennett; Johnson; Jackson | The Freshmen; Banga | 3:34 |
| 10. | "If U Can't Dance (Slide)" (featuring Nicole Scherzinger) | Smith; Johnson | The Freshmen; Banga^{[b]} | 4:03 |
| 11. | "Could U Love Me" | Smith; George Archie | G1; Banga^{[b]} | 2:50 |
| 12. | "Loretta" | Smith; Johnson | The Freshmen | 4:55 |
| 13. | "Wave Em Off" | Smith; Rambert; Bennett; Richard Grant; Raymond Grant; Edward Ellington; Juan Tizol | DJ Twinz | 3:31 |
| 14. | "Scary Story" | Smith; Terrance Lovelace; Ernest Gold; Emmanuel Okon | Hotrunner; Eleet Beats; Treezah^{[c]} | 3:39 |
| 15. | "Switch" (...R&B remix, featuring Robin Thicke) | Smith; Holland; Bennett | "Co P!"; Banga | 3:45 |
| Total length: | | | | 55:05 |

European bonus tracks
| No. | Title | Writer(s) | Producer(s) | Length |
|---|---|---|---|---|
| 16. | "Coming to the Stage" (includes hidden track "Switch" (reggae remix) featuring Elephant Man) | Smith; Lovelace; Michael Edwards | Hotrunners; Mike Hype; Treezah^{[c]} | 8:10 |
| Total length: | | | | 59:24 |

European special edition bonus tracks
| No. | Title | Writer(s) | Producer(s) | Length |
|---|---|---|---|---|
| 16. | "Coming to the Stage" | Smith; Lovelace; Edwards | Hotrunners; Hype; Treezah^{[c]} | 4:22 |
| 17. | "We Won't" (includes hidden track "Switch" (reggae remix) featuring Elephant Man) | Smith; Tony Dofat; Bennett | Dofat; Banga^{[b]} | 8:35 |
| Total length: | | | | 64:11 |

Notes

- ^{^a} signifies a co-producer
- ^{^b} signifies a vocal producer
- ^{^c} signifies an additional producer
- "Party Starter" features vocals by Jorge Maciel and Ludacris.
- "Tell Me Why" features vocals by Tye Tribbett and G.A.
- "Pump Ya Brakes" features vocals by O. Banga.
- "Could U Love Me" features vocals by Andre Merritt.
- "Loretta" features vocals by Kelli Price.
- "Scary Story" features vocals by Willow Smith.
- "Coming to the Stage" and "We Won't" feature vocals by DJ Kool.

Sample credits

- "Here He Comes" contains elements of "Spider-Man", written by J. Robert Harris and Paul Francis Webster.
- "Ms. Holy Roller" contains samples of "Estoria da Boca", written by Antônio Pinto and Ed Cortes.
- "Wave Em Off" contains samples of "Caravan", written by Duke Ellington and Juan Tizol, and performed by Rhythm Heritage.
- "Scary Story" contains samples of "Exodus", written by Ernest Gold.

== Personnel ==
Personnel credits adapted from liner notes.

- Treezah – recording (tracks 1, 2, 4, 5, 6, 8, 9, 10, 12, 15 and 16), various instruments (tracks 4, 8 – "I Wish I Made That" only – and 12), piano (track 7), guitar (track 13), bass (track 14)
- Pete Novak – recording (tracks 1, 2, 3, 6, 7, 9, 10, 11, 13, 15, 16 and 17)
- Kevin Davis – mixing (tracks 3, 6, 8, 9, 10, 13, 15, 16 and 17)
- Dave Pensado – mixing (tracks 1, 2, 4, 5 and 12)
- Larry Gold – string arrangements (tracks 1, 6 and 7)
- Dylan Margerum – recording (tracks 3 and 13)
- DJ Jazzy Jeff – scratches (tracks 9 and 10)
- Jukebox – beatboxing (track 1)
- Mike Hartnett – guitar and bass (track 2)
- Donnie Scantz – keyboards (track 2)
- Brian Golder – recording (track 7)
- Raphael Saadiq – guitar (track 11)
- G1 – mixing (track 11)
- James Mellow Clarke – bass and keyboards (track 13)
- Tony Dofat – various instruments (track 17)
- Alfred – recording (track 17)

== Charts ==
=== Weekly charts ===
| Chart (2005) | Peak position |
|---|---|
| Australian Albums (ARIA) | 87 |
| Australian Urban Albums (ARIA) | 17 |
| Austrian Albums (Ö3 Austria) | 30 |
| Belgian Albums (Ultratop Flanders) | 44 |
| Canadian Albums (Billboard) | 8 |
| Dutch Albums (Album Top 100) | 76 |
| French Albums (SNEP) | 103 |
| German Albums (Offizielle Top 100) | 14 |
| Italian Albums (FIMI) | 31 |
| Japanese Albums (Oricon) | 35 |
| Scottish Albums (Official Charts) | 21 |
| Spanish Albums (Promusicae) | 92 |
| Swiss Albums (Schweizer Hitparade) | 35 |
| UK Albums (Official Charts) | 15 |
| UK Jazz & Blues Albums (Official Charts) | 25 |
| UK R&B Albums (Official Charts) | 9 |
| US Billboard 200 | 6 |
| US Top R&B/Hip-Hop Albums (Billboard) | 4 |

=== Year-end charts ===
| Chart (2005) | Position |
|---|---|
| US Billboard 200 | 103 |
| US Top R&B/Hip-Hop Albums (Billboard) | 89 |

== Certifications ==
| Region | Certification | Certified units/sales |
|---|---|---|
| United Kingdom (BPI) | Silver | 60,000^{^} |
| United States (RIAA) | Gold | 500,000^{^} |
^{^} Shipments figures based on certification alone.
