= Storm in the Heartland (song) =

Single by Billy Ray Cyrus

from the album Storm in the Heartland
- B-side: "I Ain't Even Left"
- Released: October 22, 1994
- Genre: Country
- Length: 3:51
- Label: Mercury
- Songwriters: Billy Henderson, Curt Ryle, Donald Burns
- Producers: Joe Scaife, Jim Cotton

Billy Ray Cyrus singles chronology
| "Talk Some" (1994) | "Storm in the Heartland" (1994) | "Deja Blue" (1995) |

"Storm in the Heartland" is a song written by Billy Henderson, Curt Ryle and Donald Burns, and recorded by American country music artist Billy Ray Cyrus. It was released in October 1994 as the first single and title track from the album Storm in the Heartland. The song reached #33 on the Billboard Hot Country Singles & Tracks chart.

== Chart performance ==
| Chart (1994–1995) | Peak position |
|---|---|
| Canada Country Singles (RPM) | 16 |
| US Bubbling Under Hot 100 (Billboard) | 8 |
| US Hot Country Songs (Billboard) | 33 |
