= Wher'm I Gonna Live? =

Single by Billy Ray Cyrus

from the album Some Gave All
- B-side: "Some Gave All"
- Released: October 17, 1992
- Recorded: 1991
- Genre: Country
- Length: 3:29
- Label: Mercury
- Songwriters: Billy Ray Cyrus, Cindy Cyrus
- Producers: Joe Scaife, Jim Cotton

Billy Ray Cyrus singles chronology
"Could've Been Me" (1992)	"Wher'm I Gonna Live?" (1992)	"She's Not Cryin' Anymore" (1993)

"Wher'm I Gonna Live?" is a song co-written and recorded by American country music singer Billy Ray Cyrus. It was released in October 1992 as the third single from his debut album Some Gave All. The song was written by Cyrus and his then-wife Cindy.

== Content ==
The male narrator comes home to find his wife has thrown out all his belongings on the front lawn and asks himself where is he going to go. Cyrus admitted in a 2013 interview that the song was based on his own experience at the end of his first marriage to Cindy Smith.

Cyrus said about the experience:

I played this little club in West Virginia 5 nights a week, 4 sets a night. ... One night I came home on a Tuesday night, which evolved into Wednesday morning when all my stuff was sitting out in the front yard. I asked myself, 'Where am I gonna live? Where am I gonna live when I get home, my gosh that's a song!' And anyway, I just started singing this song as I sat there looking at all my belongings on the road there in Ironton, Ohio.

== Chart performance ==
"Wher'm I Gonna Live?" debuted at number 62 on the Billboard Hot Country Singles & Tracks chart for the chart week of October 17, 1992, and reached a peak of number 23 on December 5, 1992, after 20 weeks on the chart.

Chart (1992)	Peak position
Canadian RPM Hot Country Tracks	16
US Hot Country Songs (Billboard)	23
