= Some Gave All =

Studio album by Billy Ray Cyrus
- Released: May 19, 1992
- Recorded: 1991–92
- Studios: Music Mill (Nashville, Tennessee)
- Genre: Country
- Length: 35:42
- Label: Mercury
- Producers: Joe Scaife; Jim Cotton

Billy Ray Cyrus chronology
Some Gave All (1992)	It Won't Be the Last (1993)

Singles from Some Gave All
- 1. "Achy Breaky Heart" Released: March 23, 1992; 2. "Could've Been Me" Released: July 22, 1992; 3. "Wher'm I Gonna Live?" Released: October 17, 1992; 4. "She's Not Cryin' Anymore" Released: January 23, 1993

Some Gave All is the debut studio album by American singer Billy Ray Cyrus. It was his first album for Mercury Records in 1992 and became the best selling album of that year in the United States, selling over 9 million copies in the first 12 months of release. It produced four hit singles on the Billboard country charts. The first of these was Cyrus's breakthrough song "Achy Breaky Heart", which topped the charts in several countries. In the US it was a five-week number one on the Hot Country Songs chart, as well as a top 5 hit on the Billboard Hot 100. It became the first single ever to achieve triple Platinum status in Australia and was the best-selling single of 1992 in the same country. Thanks to the video of the song, there was an explosion of line dancing into the mainstream, becoming a craze. The song earned Grammy Award nominations for Cyrus in the categories Record of the Year and Best Country Vocal Performance, Male. That same year, Cyrus also received a Grammy Award nomination for Best New Artist. "Achy Breaky Heart" was originally recorded as "Don't Tell My Heart" by The Marcy Brothers on their 1991 self-titled album.

"Could've Been Me", "Wher'm I Gonna Live?" and "She's Not Cryin' Anymore" were also released as singles, peaking at numbers 2, 23, and 6, respectively, on the country charts. The title track also reached number 52 based on unsolicited airplay and Cyrus' cover of "These Boots Are Made for Walkin'" charted only outside the United States.

== Critical reception ==
Professional ratings
Review scores
Source	Rating
AllMusic	4/5 stars
Entertainment Weekly	D+
Orlando Sentinel	1/5 stars
Rolling Stone	3/5 stars
The Village Voice	C+

Reviewing for The Village Voice in December 1992, Robert Christgau was critical of Cyrus for "oversinging like Michael Bolton at a Perot rally" throughout the album and for celebrating warfare in the title song. However, he offered some approval of Cyrus's "nice macho self-mockery" on "Achy Breaky Heart", "Wher'm I Gonna Live?", and "I'm So Miserable", concluding that with time he may develop into a 21st-century version of Waylon Jennings.

In 2006, Some Gave All ranked at number 33 in Q magazine's list of "The 50 Worst Albums Ever!"

== Commercial performance ==
Overall, the album is his most successful album to date, which has been certified 9× Multi-Platinum in the United States and is the longest time spent by a debut artist at number one on the Billboard 200 (17 consecutive weeks) and most consecutive chart-topping weeks in the SoundScan era. It is the only album (from any genre) in the SoundScan era to log 17 consecutive weeks at number one and is also the top-ranking debut album by a country artist. It ranked 43 weeks in the top 10, a total topped by only one country album in history, Ropin' the Wind by Garth Brooks. Some Gave All was also the first debut album to enter at the number 1 in the Billboard Country Albums chart. The album has also sold more than 20 million copies worldwide and is the best-selling debut album of all time for a solo artist and remains one of the biggest selling albums of all time. Some Gave All was also the best-selling album of 1992 in the US with 4.7 million copies sold. As of April 2019 the album has sold 7.5 million copies in United States according to Nielsen Music.

== Track listing ==
No.	Title	Writer(s)	Length
1.	"Could've Been Me"	Monty Powell; Reed Nielsen	3:44
2.	"Achy Breaky Heart"	Don Von Tress	3:23
3.	"She's Not Cryin' Anymore"	Billy Ray Cyrus; Buddy Cannon; Terry Shelton	3:25
4.	"Wher'm I Gonna Live?"	B.R. Cyrus; Cindy Cyrus	3:29
5.	"These Boots Are Made for Walkin'"	Lee Hazlewood	2:47
6.	"Someday, Somewhere, Somehow"	B.R. Cyrus	3:47
7.	"Never Thought I'd Fall in Love with You"	Jim McKnight; Mike Murphy	3:41
8.	"Ain't No Good Goodbye"	Barton Stevens; B.R. Cyrus; Kevin White	3:22
9.	"I'm So Miserable"	B.R. Cyrus; Corky Holbrook	3:59
10.	"Some Gave All"	B.R. Cyrus; C. Cyrus	4:05
Total length:			35:42

== Personnel ==
Adapted credits from the media notes of Some Gave All.

Sly Dog

- Billy Ray Cyrus – lead vocals, backing vocals
- Greg Fletcher – drums, percussion
- Corky Holbrook – bass guitar
- Terry Shelton – acoustic guitar, electric guitar
- Barton Stevens – keyboards, backing vocals

Additional musicians

- Clyde Carr – backing vocals
- Costo Davis – synthesizer
- Sonny Garrish – steel guitar
- Keith D. Hinton – acoustic guitar, electric guitar
- Joe Scaife – backing vocals

Production

- Joe Scaife – co-producer, mixing
- Jim Cotton – co-producer, mixing
- Grahame Snith – assistant engineer
- Clyde Carr – assistant engineer
- Hank Williams – mastering

== Charts ==
=== Weekly charts ===
Weekly chart performance for Some Gave All
Chart (1992–1995)	Peak position
Australian Albums (ARIA)	1
Austrian Albums (Ö3 Austria)	32
Canadian Albums (RPM)	1
Canadian Country Albums (RPM)	1
Danish Albums (IFPI)	9
Dutch Albums (Album Top 100)	58
European Albums (IFPI)	18
Finnish Albums (The Official Finnish Charts)	20
French Albums (IFOP)	33
German Albums (Offizielle Top 100)	48
Irish Albums (IFPI)	9
Japanese Albums (Oricon)	7
New Zealand Albums (RMNZ)	2
Norwegian Albums (VG-lista)	5
Spanish Albums (AFYVE)	40
Swedish Albums (Sverigetopplistan)	42
Swiss Albums (Schweizer Hitparade)	34
UK Albums (Official Charts)	9
US Billboard 200	1
US Top Album Sales (Billboard)	1
US Top Country Albums (Billboard)	1

=== Year-end charts ===
1992 Year-end chart performance for Some Gave All
Chart (1992)	Position
Australian Albums (ARIA)	9
Canada Top Albums/CDs (RPM)	6
New Zealand Albums (RMNZ)	24
US Billboard 200	4

1993 Year-end chart performance for Some Gave All
Chart (1993)	Position
Canada Top Albums/CDs (RPM)	80
US Billboard 200	5

=== End-of-decade charts ===
Chart (1990–1999)	Position
US Billboard 200	23

=== Singles ===
Year	Single	Peak chart positions										Certifications (sales threshold)
Year	Single	US Country	US	CAN Country	CAN	AUS	GER	IRE	NL	NZ	UK	Certifications (sales threshold)
1992	"Achy Breaky Heart"	1	4	1	4	1	62	2	23	1	3	US: Platinum; UK: Silver; AUS: 3× Platinum
1992	"Could've Been Me"	2	72	1	72	43	59	15	28	7	24	
1992	"Wher'm I Gonna Live?"	23	—	16	—	—	—	—	—	—	—	
1992	"These Boots Are Made for Walkin'"	—	—	—	—	—	—	—	27	42	63	
1993	"She's Not Cryin' Anymore"	6	70	3	—	—	—	—	—	—	—	
"—" denotes releases that did not chart

=== Other charted songs ===
Year	Single	Peak chart positions	
Year	Single	US Country	CAN Country
1992	"Some Gave All"	52	86

== Certifications ==
Region	Certification	Certified units/sales
Australia (ARIA)	3× Platinum	210,000^{^}
Canada (Music Canada)	Diamond	1,000,000^{^}
Denmark (IFPI Danmark)	Platinum	80,000
New Zealand (RMNZ)	Platinum	15,000^{^}
United Kingdom (BPI)	Gold	100,000^{^}
United States (RIAA)	9× Platinum	9,000,000^{^}
^{^} Shipments figures based on certification alone.

== See also ==
- List of best-selling albums in the United States
- List of number-one albums of 1992 (U.S.)
