= Words by Heart =

Single by Billy Ray Cyrus

from the album It Won't Be the Last
- B-side: "Throwin' Stones"
- Released: January 24, 1994
- Genre: Country
- Length: 3:07
- Label: PolyGram; Mercury
- Songwriters: Reed Nielsen; Monty Powell
- Producers: Jim Cotton; Joe Scaife

Billy Ray Cyrus singles chronology
"Somebody New" (1993)	"Words by Heart" (1994)	"Talk Some" (1994)

"Words by Heart" is a song written by Reed Nielsen and Monty Powell, and recorded by American country music singer Billy Ray Cyrus. It was released in January 1994 as the third single from his platinum-selling second album, It Won't Be the Last. The song was the follow-up to "Somebody New". "Words by Heart" reached a peak of number 12 on the Billboard Hot Country Singles & Tracks (now Hot Country Songs chart), and number 19 on the U.S. Bubbling Under Hot 100 chart. It also gained play in Canada, where it reached number 14.

== Content ==
"Words by Heart" describes a man who goes to his parents' house to pack up his things. He then finds his letter man's jacket that contains the breakup letter from his then girlfriend. Thoughts about the past relationship go back to his memory, most especially how his first love was like.

== Critical reception ==
Deborah Evans Price, of Billboard magazine reviewed the song favorably, saying that Cyrus "applies his well-rehearsed Springsteen growl and delivers an over-dramatic reading of this nostalgic ode to a lost high school love."

== Music video ==
The music video was directed by Charley Randazzo, and premiered in early 1994.

== Chart performance ==
"Words by Heart" debuted at number 68 on the U.S. Billboard Hot Country Singles & Tracks for the week of January 29, 1994.

Chart (1994)	Peak position
Canada Country Singles (RPM)	14
US Billboard Hot 100	119
US Hot Country Songs (Billboard)	12
