= Storm in the Heartland =

Studio album by Billy Ray Cyrus
- Released: November 8, 1994
- Recorded: 1993–1994
- Studio: Music Mill Recording Studio, Screaming Woo Studio, Sound Stage Studios; Nashville, TN
- Genre: Country
- Length: 55:18
- Label: Mercury
- Producer: Jim Cotton; Joe Scaife

Billy Ray Cyrus chronology
| It Won't Be the Last (1993) | Storm in the Heartland (1994) | Trail of Tears (1996) |

Singles from Storm in the Heartland
- 1. "Storm in the Heartland" Released: October 22, 1994; 2. "Deja Blue" Released: February 4, 1995; 3. "One Last Thrill" Released: April 1995

Storm in the Heartland is the third studio album by American country music artist Billy Ray Cyrus. Released in 1994 on Mercury Records, it produced the singles "Storm in the Heartland", "Deja Blue", and "One Last Thrill", the first two of which entered the Hot Country Singles & Tracks (now Hot Country Songs) charts. The album itself was certified gold by the RIAA for sales of over 500,000 copies.

== Content ==
"How Much" was originally recorded by co-writer Danny Tate for his 1992 self-titled album.

"Only God (Could Stop Me Loving You)" was later recorded by Chris Ward for his 1996 album One Step Beyond, by Lari White as a duet with Toby Keith on White's 1998 album Stepping Stone, and by the Canadian country band Emerson Drive on their 2002 self-titled album. Emerson Drive's rendition was released as a single in 2003.

== Critical reception ==
Professional ratings
Review scores
| Source | Rating |
|---|---|
| AllMusic | 3/5 stars |
| Entertainment Weekly | C |
| New Country | 2/5 stars |

Stephen Thomas Erlewine of AllMusic said that he considered the album an improvement over It Won't Be the Last. Chris Dickinson of New Country magazine gave it 2 out of 5. He wrote that "On Storm in the Heartland, Cyrus kept the pop, the rock, the bombast, and the bluster, but tossed out the memorable hooks." He thought that the album lacked personality and had "cluttered" production, but praised "A Heart with Your Name on It" and "Roll Me Over" as "fun", and "Patsy Come Home" as "sentimental but moving." Giving it a "C", Alanna Nash of Entertainment Weekly wrote that Cyrus "sticks to the tried-and-true" but added that "the yahoo factor figures heavily on 'Redneck Heaven'[…]and on 'The Past,' Cyrus misses his notes by a mile. An achy-breaky embarrassment."

== Track listing ==
1. "Storm in the Heartland" (Billy Henderson, Donald Burns, Curt Ryle) — 3:53
2. "Deja Blue" (Craig Wiseman, Donny Lowery) — 3:36
3. "Redneck Heaven" (Billy Ray Cyrus, Terry Shelton, Michael Joe Sagraves, Mark Collie, Danny Shirley) — 4:03
  - featuring Mark Collie and Danny Shirley
4. "Casualty of Love" (Cyrus, Don Von Tress) — 4:29
5. "One Last Thrill" (Dave Loggins, Reed Nielsen) — 3:38
6. "I Ain't Even Left" (Cyrus, Corky Holbrook, Joe Scaife) — 3:51
7. "How Much" (Gregg Sutton, Danny Tate) — 5:30
8. "Patsy Come Home" (Ronnie Scaife, Katie Wallace) — 3:53
9. "A Heart with Your Name on It" (Brett Beavers, Phillip Douglas) — 2:44
10. "Only God Could Stop Me Loving You" (Robert John "Mutt" Lange) — 5:10
11. "Roll Me Over" (Cyrus, Barton Stevens, Greg Fletcher, Shelton, Holbrook, Sagraves) — 2:33
12. "Enough Is Enough" (Cyrus, Von Tress, Keith Hinton) — 3:43
13. "The Past" (Cyrus) — 4:06
14. "Geronimo" (Cyrus, Von Tress, Hinton) — 3:51

== Chart performance ==
=== Weekly charts ===
| Chart (1994) | Peak position |
|---|---|
| Canadian Country Albums (RPM) | 6 |
| Swiss Albums (Schweizer Hitparade) | 40 |
| US Billboard 200 | 73 |
| US Top Country Albums (Billboard) | 11 |

=== Year-end charts ===
| Chart (1995) | Position |
|---|---|
| US Top Country Albums (Billboard) | 38 |

=== Singles ===
| Year | Single | Peak chart positions | | |
| Year | Single | US Country | US | CAN Country |
|---|---|---|---|---|
| 1994 | "Storm in the Heartland" | 33 | 108 | 17 |
| 1995 | "Deja Blue" | 66 | — | 60 |
| 1995 | "One Last Thrill" | — | — | — |
"—" denotes releases that failed to chart

== Personnel ==
As listed in the album's liner notes.

Sly Dog

- Billy Ray Cyrus - lead vocals, rhythm guitar
- Greg Fletcher - drums, percussion, background vocals
- Corky Holbrook - bass, background vocals
- Michael J. Sagraves - acoustic guitar, electric guitar, steel, harmonica, harp, slide guitar, background vocals
- Terry Shelton - lead guitar, background vocals
- Barton Stevens - keyboards, background vocals

Additional musicians

- Eddie Bayers - drums
- Mike Brignardello - bass guitar
- Clyde "Butch" Carr - tambourine, background vocals
- Mark Collie - background vocals on "Redneck Heaven"
- Jim Cotton - Indian chants on "Geronimo"
- Dan Dugmore - steel guitar, lap steel guitar, Dobro
- Sonny Garrish - Dobro
- Keith Hinton - acoustic guitar, electric guitar, Indian chants on "Geronimo"
- Mike Lawler - keyboards
- Dave Loggins - background vocals on "One Last Thrill"
- Gary Lunn - bass guitar
- Randy McCormick - keyboards
- The Oak Ridge Boys - background vocals on "I Ain't Even Left"
- Matt Rollings - piano
- Joe Scaife - background vocals
- Ronny Scaife - acoustic guitar, background vocals
- Danny Shirley - background vocals on "Redneck Heaven"
- Joe Shirley - background vocals
- Don Von Tress - acoustic guitar, electric guitar, background vocals
- Billy Joe Walker Jr. - acoustic guitar
- Reggie Young - electric guitar

== Certifications ==
| Region | Certification | Certified units/sales |
|---|---|---|
| Canada (Music Canada) | Gold | 50,000^{^} |
| United States (RIAA) | Gold | 500,000^{^} |
^{^} Shipments figures based on certification alone.
