= Trail of Tears (album) =

Studio album by Billy Ray Cyrus
- Released: August 20, 1996
- Recorded: 1995
- Studio: Screaming Woo Music and Secret Sound (Nashville, Tennessee)
- Genre: Country
- Length: 42:45
- Label: Mercury
- Producer: Billy Ray Cyrus; Terry Shelton

Billy Ray Cyrus chronology
Storm in the Heartland (1994)	Trail of Tears (1996)	The Best of Billy Ray Cyrus: Cover to Cover (1997)

Singles from Trail of Tears
- 1. "Trail of Tears" Released: August 31, 1996; 2. "Three Little Words" Released: February 8, 1997

Trail of Tears is the fourth studio album from country artist Billy Ray Cyrus. It was released on August 20, 1996, and two singles were released: the title track which featured a video directed by Rich Murray and "Three Little Words", which respectively peaked at number 69 and number 65 on the country charts.

The album debuted at number 125 on the U.S. Billboard 200, and at number 20 on the U.S. Top Country Albums. The album has sold more than 250,000 copies worldwide. Despite low sales the album was the first to receive widespread critical acclaim from music critics for Cyrus, earning him industry respect from Nashville.

== Content ==
Included on Trail of Tears are covers of "Harper Valley PTA", originally recorded by Jeannie C. Riley, "Sing Me Back Home", originally recorded by Merle Haggard and The Strangers, and "Crazy Mama", originally recorded by J. J. Cale.

Cyrus is a credited writer on all other tracks, except for the album's second single, "Three Little Words".

Cyrus said of the album, "I call it 'Homegrown Music'; it's a different kind of album. There are people we have played it for who are shocked that it's me. What's really exciting is that I'm finding that everywhere I go - from the record company to the radio stations - there is a new energy. For the first time in years, I feel free."

== Recording ==
Trail of Tears was recorded with Cyrus's band Sly Dog in a log cabin owned by band member Terry Shelton, who served as producer on the album along with Cyrus. Cyrus said, "There we were, way out in Kingston Springs, TN, at the head of some holler. And I'm thinking, 'This is sonically better than my previous three albums. Am I crazy?' But then I thought of all the great records that had come from home studios, I started thinking, 'This ain't crazy -just because it's not some glossy studio down on 16th Avenue with a multi-million-dollar console and stuff, doesn't mean it's no good.'"

== Critical reception ==
Professional ratings
Review scores
Source	Rating
AllMusic	4/5 stars
Entertainment Weekly	B

AllMusic's Thom Owens called it Cyrus' "most personal and [most] accomplished album", pointing out the "rootsy production flourishes" that added grit and edge to the overall sound and Cyrus having more conviction in his delivery, concluding that: "In fact, Trail of Tears suggests that he may be able to carve out a successful career for himself, after all." Alanna Nash of Entertainment Weekly called it "a rapidly maturing, bleeding-heart blend of roots rock and country classics wrapped in bare-bones production." She added that "Need a Little Help" and the title track had the potential to turn Cyrus into an "artistic contender".

== Track listing ==
Trail of Tears track listing
No.	Title	Writer(s)	Length
1.	"Trail of Tears"	Billy Ray Cyrus	3:41
2.	"Truth Is, I Lied"	Cyrus; Don Von Tress; Carl Perkins	3:18
3.	"Tenntucky"	Cyrus; Mark Collie	2:23
4.	"Call Me Daddy"	Cyrus; Von Tress; Michael Joe Sagraves	5:08
5.	"Sing Me Back Home"	Merle Haggard	3:37
6.	"Three Little Words"	Wayne Perkins; Jim Collins	4:14
7.	"Harper Valley PTA"	Tom T. Hall	4:10
8.	"I Am Here Now"	Cyrus; Sagraves; Corky Holbrook; Terry Shelton	3:28
9.	"Need a Little Help"	Cyrus; Von Tress	5:08
10.	"Should I Stay"	Cyrus	4:38
11.	"Crazy Mama"	J.J. Cale	3:00
Total length:			42:45

== Personnel ==
Credits adapted from the Trail of Tears media notes.

Sly Dog

- Billy Ray Cyrus – lead vocals, background vocals, acoustic guitar
- Greg Fletcher – drums
- Corky Holbrook – bass guitar
- Michael J. Sagraves – dobro, acoustic guitar, electric guitar, steel guitar, harmonica, mandolin, slide guitar
- Terry Shelton – drums, 12-string guitar, acoustic guitar, electric guitar, keyboards, percussion
- Barton Stevens – keyboards, background vocals

Additional Musicians

- Ava Aldridge – background vocals
- Jeff E. Cox – bass guitar
- Mark Douthit – saxophone
- John Griffiths – background vocals
- Lee Hendricks – bass guitar
- Wanda Vick – fiddle
- Don Von Tress – acoustic guitar, electric guitar, bass guitar, mandolin, background vocals
- Bob Workman – bass guitar

Production

- Billy Ray Cyrus – co-producer
- Terry Shelton – co-producer, mixing
- John Jaszcz – mixing
- Chuck Linder – assistant engineer
- Michael Joe Sagraves – assistant engineer
- Hank Williams – mastering

== Chart performance ==
Album

Chart (1996)	Peak position
Canadian Top Country Albums	14
Swiss Music Charts	50
U.S. Billboard 200	125
U.S. Billboard Top Country Albums	20

Singles

Year	Single	Peak chart positions	
Year	Single	US Country	CAN Country
1996	"Trail of Tears"	69	59
1997	"Three Little Words"	65	61
