= Could've Been Me =

1992 single by Billy Ray Cyrus

Single by Billy Ray Cyrus

from the album Some Gave All
- B-side: "I'm So Miserable"
- Released: July 22, 1992
- Length: 3:44
- Label: Mercury
- Songwriters: Reed Nielsen; Monty Powell
- Producers: Joe Scaife; Jim Cotton

Billy Ray Cyrus singles chronology
"Achy Breaky Heart" (1992)	"Could've Been Me" (1992)	"Wher'm I Gonna Live?" (1992)

"Could've Been Me" is a song written by Reed Nielsen and Monty Powell, and recorded by American country music artist Billy Ray Cyrus. It was released in July 1992 by Mercury Records as the second single from his multi-platinum selling debut album, Some Gave All (1992). The song reached number 2 on the US Hot Country Singles & Tracks chart, and it also reached number 1 on the Canadian RPM Country Tracks chart. It was the follow-up to the number 1 song, "Achy Breaky Heart".

== Critical reception ==
Deborah Evans Price, of Billboard magazine reviewed the song favorably, calling it a "flair of Springsteen-ish style." She states to "look for the multiformat ball to keep on rolling."

== Music video ==
The music video for "Could've Been Me" was directed by Marc Ball and produced by Kitty Moon, and premiered in mid-1992.

== Charts ==
=== Weekly charts ===
Chart (1992)	Peak position
Australia (ARIA)	43
Belgium (Ultratop 50 Flanders)	40
Canada Country Singles (RPM)	1
Canada Top Singles (RPM)	72
Europe (Eurochart Hot 100)	67
Germany (GfK)	59
Ireland (IRMA)	15
Netherlands (Dutch Top 40)	28
Netherlands (Single Top 100)	29
New Zealand (Recorded Music NZ)	7
UK Singles (Official Charts)	24
UK Airplay (Music Week)	45
US Billboard Hot 100	72
US Adult Contemporary (Billboard)	45
US Hot Country Songs (Billboard)	2
US Cash Box Top 100	70

=== Year-end charts ===
Chart (1992)	Position
Canada Country Tracks (RPM)	24
US Country Songs (Billboard)	30
