= Achy Breaky Heart =

1992 single by Billy Ray Cyrus

Single by Billy Ray Cyrus

from the album Some Gave All
- Released: March 23, 1992
- Recorded: November 1991
- Genre: Country
- Length: 3:23
- Label: Mercury
- Songwriter: Don Von Tress
- Producers: Joe Scaife; Jim Cotton

Billy Ray Cyrus singles chronology
"Achy Breaky Heart" (1992)	"Could've Been Me" (1992)

Music video
- "Achy Breaky Heart" on YouTube

"Achy Breaky Heart" is a song written in 1990 by Don Von Tress. First released in 1991 by the Marcy Brothers with the title "Don't Tell My Heart", it was later recorded by American singer and actor Billy Ray Cyrus and released on his debut album, Some Gave All (1992). The song is Cyrus's debut single and signature song. It became the first single ever to achieve triple platinum status in Australia and also 1992's best-selling single in the same country. In the United States, it became a crossover hit on pop and country radio, peaking at No. 4 on both the Cash Box Top 100 and Billboard Hot 100, and topping the Hot Country Singles & Tracks chart, becoming the first country single to be certified platinum since "Islands in the Stream" by Kenny Rogers and Dolly Parton in 1983. The single topped in several countries, and after being featured on Top of the Pops in the United Kingdom, peaked at No. 3 on the UK Singles Chart. It was Cyrus's biggest hit single in the U.S. until he was featured on the remix of "Old Town Road" by rapper Lil Nas X, which peaked at No. 1 on the Billboard Hot 100 27 years later.

The music video for the song led to the explosion of the line dance into the mainstream. The song is considered by some as one of the worst songs of all time, featuring at No. 2 on VH1 and Blender's list of the "50 Most Awesomely Bad Songs Ever".

== Background ==
"Achy Breaky Heart" was written by amateur songwriter Don Von Tress from Cypress Inn, Tennessee, in 1990, according to him "just fooling around on the guitar and a drum machine".

The song was initially to be recorded by the Oak Ridge Boys in the early 1990s, but the group decided against recording it after lead singer Duane Allen said that he disliked the words "achy breaky". It was then recorded in 1991 under the title "Don't Tell My Heart" by the Marcy Brothers, although their version changed some lyrics.

Billy Ray Cyrus heard Von Tress's version of the song, and chose to include it on his debut album Some Gave All in 1992. It is written in the key of A major and has only two chords: A and E.

== Critical reception ==
J.D. Considine from The Baltimore Sun wrote, "It would be hard to think of a more perfect example of how contemporary country has co-opted the sound of rock 'n' roll than Billy Ray Cyrus's single, "Achy Breaky Heart". Between the down-home twang of the vocal and the foot-tapping insistence of the boogie guitar licks, it has no trouble walking the line between Southern rock and Nashville sentimentality." A review from Cash Box magazine was also positive, stating that "The song is good, but it is his performance that will keep you wired." Paul Mathur from Melody Maker said it's like "a country record done by an Eskimo." Parry Gettelman from Orlando Sentinel felt it "has a catchy melody but the kind you wish were a lot less catchy. It sticks in your mind like a commercial jingle. The song also is annoyingly full of arch puns."

The song reached No. 23 on CMT's 100 Greatest Videos in 2008, No. 2 on VH1's 50 Most Awesomely Bad Songs, and Blender magazine's 50 Worst Songs Ever. In 2002, Shelly Fabian from About.com ranked the song No. 249 on the list of the Top 500 Country Music Songs. In 2007, the song was ranked at No. 87 on VH1's 100 Greatest Songs of the '90s.

Despite its initially negative critical reviews, the song has become a cult classic. For his 2017 album Set the Record Straight, Cyrus recorded an updated version of the song. Members of the Muscle Shoals Rhythm Section participated in the recording Rolling Stone called "more faithful to songwriter Don Von Tress's swampy demo."

== Music video ==
Two very similar versions of the video for the song exist. Directed by Marc Ball, it was filmed during a live performance at the Paramount Arts Center in Ashland, Kentucky. The version released to country stations begins with a shot of the theater and ends with extended applause from the audience. The version released to MTV (which is the version found on Cyrus's YouTube account), begins with Cyrus exiting a limo, and the ending cheer from the audience is much shorter.

== Notable covers and parodies ==
Alvin and the Chipmunks covered the song in 1992 on Chipmunks in Low Places. This version, which features speaking parts by Cyrus, reached No. 71 on the Billboard Hot Country Singles & Tracks chart, becoming their first entry on any Billboard chart in 32 years. In the United Kingdom, this version peaked at No. 53 in late December 1992, while in Australia, it reached No. 61 in early 1993.

"Weird Al" Yankovic parodied the song on his album Alapalooza as "Achy Breaky Song", in which he pleads with the DJ not to play Billy Ray Cyrus's "Achy Breaky Heart" anymore; he can tolerate ABBA, Village People, New Kids on the Block, even Slim Whitman and Yoko Ono, but he will really go bonkers if he has to hear "Achy Breaky Heart" once more. The album's liner notes state that all proceeds of the song would be donated to United Cerebral Palsy. He later explained this was because both he and the songwriter, Don Von Tress, felt that the song was "mean-spirited".

In 2014, rapper Buck 22 released a hip-hop version of the song with Cyrus called "Achy Breaky 2", in which Cyrus reprised his role for the chorus. While Cyrus does never explicitly say the song is a parody, the lyrics and accompanying video clearly make several references to daughter Miley's bad-girl image at the time, with Billy Ray noting in a Rolling Stone article that he "[hopes] that she got to read the one critic who wrote that the video made her performance at the VMAs look like Sesame Street".

A Spanish version of the song, called "No rompas más (mi pobre corazón)" (also known as "No rompas mi corazón") was made by Eduardo Gameros, singer and violinist of Mexican country music group Caballo Dorado, in 1994. The song is often paired at parties with another of their songs, "Payaso de rodeo". A mixed language (English and Spanish) duet version by Cyrus and Caballo Dorado celebrated the 25th anniversary of the song in 2017.

In 1999, Tom Smith recorded a parody "Telly Taley Heart", whose lyrics humorously retell Edgar Allan Poe's 1843 short story The Tell-Tale Heart, about a murderer trying to conceal the still-beating heart of his victim.

The Brazilian duo Chitãozinho & Xororó released a version in Portuguese called "Pura Emoção", included on their 1998 album Da Aba do Meu Chapéu.

== Usage in sports ==
Supporters of many British football clubs have used chants based on the tune of the song, including West Ham United (about Dimitri Payet), Arsenal F.C. (about Mesut Özil), Aston Villa F.C. (about John McGinn), Newcastle United F.C., Tottenham Hotspur (about Dele Alli), Cardiff City F.C. (about Malky Mackay), Celtic F.C., Manchester United F.C. (about Park Ji-sung), and Wrexham A.F.C. (about Paul Mullin). It has also been adapted as "Don't Take Me Home", which has been sung by the supporters of several national football teams, including England, Wales, the Republic of Ireland and Sweden. The chant was particularly associated with Wales's run to the semi-finals of UEFA Euro 2016, and lent its name to Don't Take Me Home, a documentary film about the team's performances at that tournament.

== Track listings ==
=== Billy Ray Cyrus version ===
CD maxi

1. "Achy Breaky Heart" — 3:24
2. "I'm So Miserable" — 4:00
3. "Wher'm I Gonna Live?" — 3:29

=== Alvin and the Chipmunks version ===
7-inch single

1. "Achy Breaky Heart"
2. "I Ain't No Dang Cartoon"

== Charts ==
Cyrus's version of the song spent five weeks at the top of the Billboard Hot Country Singles & Tracks chart in 1992. This was the longest time spent at the top of that chart by a debut single since "Skip a Rope" by Henson Cargill in 1967 and the last until "Austin" by Blake Shelton in 2001.

=== Billy Ray Cyrus version ===
==== Weekly charts ====
Chart (1992)	Peak position
Australia (ARIA)	1
Austria (Ö3 Austria Top 40)	6
Belgium (Ultratop 50 Flanders)	6
Canada Retail Singles (The Record)	1
Canada Top Singles (RPM)	4
Canada Adult Contemporary (RPM)	5
Canada Country Singles (RPM)	1
Denmark (IFPI)	5
Europe (Eurochart Hot 100)	8
France (SNEP)	11
Germany (GfK)	27
Ireland (IRMA)	2
Netherlands (Dutch Top 40)	23
Netherlands (Single Top 100)	25
New Zealand (Recorded Music NZ)	1
Switzerland (Schweizer Hitparade)	22
UK Singles (Official Charts)	3
UK Airplay (Music Week)	1
US Billboard Hot 100	4
US Adult Contemporary (Billboard)	23
US Hot Country Songs (Billboard)	1
US Cash Box Top 100	4

=== Alvin and the Chipmunks version ===
Chart (1992–1993)	Peak position
Australia (ARIA)	61
UK Singles (Official Charts)	53
US Hot Country Songs (Billboard)	71

==== Year-end charts ====
Chart (1992)	Position
Australia (ARIA)	1
Belgium (Ultratop)	39
Canada Top Singles (RPM)	60
Canada Adult Contemporary (RPM)	54
Canada Country Tracks (RPM)	1
Europe (Eurochart Hot 100)	56
Europe (European Hit Radio)	35
Germany (Media Control)	88
New Zealand (RIANZ)	1
UK Singles (OCC)	21
UK Airplay (Music Week)	24
US Billboard Hot 100	15
US Hot Country Singles & Tracks (Billboard)	2
US Cash Box Top 100	10

==== Decade-end charts ====
Decade-end chart performance for Achy Breaky Heart"
Chart (1990–1999)	Position
Canada (Nielsen SoundScan)	44

== Certifications ==
Region	Certification	Certified units/sales
Australia (ARIA)	2× Platinum	140,000^{^}
Denmark (IFPI Danmark)	Gold	45,000^{‡}
New Zealand (RMNZ)	Platinum	10,000^{*}
United Kingdom (BPI)	Silver	200,000^{^}
United States (RIAA)	Platinum	1,000,000^{^}
^{*} Sales figures based on certification alone.^{^} Shipments figures based on certification alone.^{‡} Sales+streaming figures based on certification alone.
