= In the Heart of a Woman =

Single by Billy Ray Cyrus

from the album It Won't Be the Last
- B-side: "Right Face Wrong Time"
- Released: June 29, 1993
- Genre: Country
- Length: 4:00
- Label: PolyGram; Mercury
- Songwriters: Keith Hinton; Brett Cartwright
- Producers: Joe Scaife; Jim Cotton

Billy Ray Cyrus singles chronology
"She's Not Cryin' Anymore" (1993)	"In the Heart of a Woman" (1993)	"Somebody New" (1993)

Music video
- "In the Heart of a Woman" at CMT.com

"In the Heart of a Woman" is a song written by Keith Hinton and Brett Cartwright, and recorded by American country music singer Billy Ray Cyrus. It was released in June 1993 as the first single from his platinum-selling second album, It Won't Be the Last. The song peaked at number 3 on the Billboard Hot Country Singles & Tracks (now Hot Country Songs) chart.

== Music video ==
The music video was directed by Charley Randazzo and premiered in mid-1993.

== Chart performance ==
"In the Heart of a Woman" debuted at number 60 on the U.S. Billboard Hot Country Singles & Tracks for the week of July 3, 1993.

Chart (1993)	Peak position
Australia (ARIA Charts)	77
Canada Country Singles (RPM)	1
US Billboard Hot 100	76
US Hot Country Songs (Billboard)	3

=== Year-end charts ===
Chart (1993)	Position
Canada Country Tracks (RPM)	1
US Country Songs (Billboard)	11
