= She's Not Cryin' Anymore =

Single by Billy Ray Cyrus

from the album Some Gave All
- B-side: "Someday, Somewhere, Somehow"
- Released: January 25, 1993
- Recorded: 1991
- Genre: Country
- Length: 3:27
- Label: PolyGram; Mercury
- Songwriters: Billy Ray Cyrus; Buddy Cannon; Terry Shelton
- Producers: Joe Scaife; Jim Cotton

Billy Ray Cyrus singles chronology
"Wher'm I Gonna Live?" (1992)	"She's Not Cryin' Anymore" (1993)	"In the Heart of a Woman" (1993)

Music video
- "She's Not Cryin' Anymore" at CMT.com

"She's Not Cryin' Anymore" is a song co-written and recorded by American country music singer Billy Ray Cyrus. It was released in January 1993 as the fourth and last single from his debut album, Some Gave All. It debuted at number 57 on the U.S. Billboard Hot Country Singles & Tracks (now Hot Country Songs chart). The song was written by Cyrus, Buddy Cannon and Terry Shelton and fourth consecutive Top 40, and his third Top 10.

The song reached a peak of number 6 on the country charts, after 20 weeks. In addition to the country charts, it also reached number 70 on the Billboard Hot 100, and number 3 on the RPM Country Singles chart.

== Content ==
"She's Not Cryin' Anymore" is a ballad backed by piano and steel-string acoustic guitar. In it, the male narrator explains that his lover is "not cryin' anymore", now that she has left him for another man. He also expresses his regret for having ignored her when she needed to be loved.

In April 1993, Georgia based songwriter Danny Mote filed a lawsuit against Cyrus and the writers of "She's Not Cryin' Anymore", claiming that the song infringed the copyright of Mote's own 1973 composition "Crying Eyes". Cyrus and Mote settled the case in 1995.

== Music video ==
The music video was directed by Marc Ball and premiered in early 1993. Actress Deena Dill portrayed Billy Ray's love interest.

== Chart performance ==
Chart (1993)	Peak position
Canada Country Singles (RPM)	3
US Billboard Hot 100	70
US Hot Country Songs (Billboard)	6

=== Year-end charts ===
Chart (1993)	Position
Canada Country Tracks (RPM)	47
US Country Songs (Billboard)	60
