= Somebody New (Billy Ray Cyrus song) =

Single by Billy Ray Cyrus

from the album It Won't Be the Last
- B-side: "Only Time Will Tell"
- Released: September 1993
- Recorded: 1992–1993
- Genre: Country
- Length: 3:45
- Label: PolyGram; Mercury
- Songwriters: Alex Harvey; Mike Curtis
- Producers: Jim Cotton; Joe Scaife

Billy Ray Cyrus singles chronology
"In the Heart of a Woman" (1993)	"Somebody New" (1993)	"Words by Heart" (1994)

"Somebody New" is a song written by Alex Harvey and Mike Curtis, and recorded by American country music singer Billy Ray Cyrus. It was released in September 1993 as the second single from his platinum-selling second album, It Won't Be the Last. The song was the follow-up to "In the Heart of a Woman". "Somebody New" peaked at number 9 on the Billboard Hot Country Singles & Tracks Chart (now Hot Country Songs) on Saturday, Christmas Day of 1993. It spent 20 weeks on the chart. It peaked at number 14 in Canada.

== Chart performance ==
Chart (1993)	Peak position
Canada Country Singles (RPM)	14
US Hot Country Songs (Billboard)	9
