= ACA =

ACA may refer to:

== Arts and entertainment ==
- A Current Affair (Australian TV program), an Australian television program
- Actors Centre Australia, a private dramatic arts school
- American Choreography Awards
- American Composers Alliance
- American Council for the Arts, now part of Americans for the Arts
- American Country Awards

== Aviation ==
- Advisory Committee for Aeronautics
- Aero Club of America, US aviation group, now the National Aeronautic Association
- Agile Combat Aircraft, forerunner to the British Aerospace EAP technology demonstrator aircraft
- Air Canada, by ICAO airline designator
- American Champion Aircraft, a US light aircraft manufacturer
- Arctic Control Area, a Canadian airspace region
- Astronautics Corporation of America
- Atlantic Coast Airlines, later Independence Air
- Austrian Cockpit Association, professional pilot organization
- Acapulco International Airport in Guerrero, Mexico (IATA airport code ACA)

== Business ==
- Alerting Communicators of America, an earlier name of American Signal Corporation
- Angel Capital Association
- Australian Coal Association

== Government and politics ==
- Accessible Canada Act
- Affordable Care Act, shorthand for the Patient Protection and Affordable Care Act, commonly called "Obamacare"
- Allied Commission for Austria
- Anti-Corruption Agency, a Malaysian government agency
- Angoon Community Association, federally recognized Native American tribe in Alaska
- Australian Coal Association
- Australian Communications Authority

Historical

- Army Comrades Association, or "Blueshirts", a political organization in 1930s Ireland
- Armed Peasant Association (Spanish: Asociación Campesina Armada), also known as Armed Campesino Group, a Marxist–Leninist Paraguayan rebel group

== Organizations ==
- Academic Cooperation Association, international body to promote cooperation in higher education, based in Brussels
- Adult Children of Alcoholics & Dysfunctional Families, a mutual-help 12-step group
- African Cashew Alliance, international organization for promoting Africa's cashew industry
- American Cadet Alliance, former non-government group for military cadet activities
- American Chess Association, chess organization founded in 1857 and dissolved a few years later
- American Citizens Abroad, non-profit group advocating for American expatriates
- American Cryptogram Association, group for cryptographic puzzles
- American Crystallographic Association, scientific society
- Amputee Coalition of America, advocacy and support group
- Analytica Chimica Acta, scientific journal
- Anti-Communist Action, a far-right organization
  - NSC-131, a neo-Nazi group
- Anglican Church in America, traditionalist Anglican church body
- Army Comrades Association ("Blueshirts"), Irish militant right-wing group in 1932-1933
- Association of Canadian Archivists, professional group for Canadian historical archivists
- Atheist Community of Austin, Texas non-profit group which produces The Atheist Experience TV program
- Automóvil Club Argentino, Argentina's largest automobile association
- Automobile Club of America
- United States Army Communications Agency, a predecessor to the United States Army Network Enterprise Technology Command
- United States Army Contracting Agency, a predecessor to the United States Army Contracting Command

=== Professional associations ===
- ACA International, formerly the American Collectors Association
- American Callers Association, association of square dance callers
- American Camp Association, professional and trade association for summer (and similar) camp owners and workers
- American Chiropractic Association, professional association
- American Coatings Association, professional and trade association for paint and coatings industry
- American College of Apothecaries, professional and trade association for independent community pharmacists
- American Correctional Association, professional and trade association for prisons and prison officials and employees
- American Counseling Association, professional association
- Australasian Corrosion Association, Australia and New Zealand trade association
- Australian Counselling Association, professional association

=== School ===
- Academic Cooperation Association, international group promoting cooperation in higher education, based in Brussels

== Science and technology ==
- 7-ACA, 7-aminocephalosporanic acid
- Azodicarbonamide, a chemical foaming agent
- ACA, a codon for the amino acid threonine
- Anterior cerebral artery
- Anti-cardiolipin antibodies
- Anti-centromere antibodies
- Acrodermatitis chronica atrophicans
- ACA_{0}, an axiom system in reverse mathematics
- All common ancestors (ACA) point, also known as the identical ancestors point

== Sport ==
- Adventure Cycling Association
- African Cricket Association
- American Canoe Association
- Argentine Cricket Association
- Australian Cricketers' Association
- Australian Cricket Academy
- AC Ajaccio, a French professional football team
- AC Arles-Avignon, a French professional football team
- Absolute Championship Akhmat, a mixed martial arts, kickboxing and Brazilian jiu-jitsu promotion based in Russia

== Transport ==
- Antioch–Pittsburg (Amtrak station), by station code, in Antioch-Pittsburg, California

== Other uses ==
- aca, the ISO 639 code for the Achawa language of Colombia
- ACA, also known as Arcade Archives
- Arabic chat alphabet

== See also ==
- Aka (disambiguation)
- ACKA
