= CISR (disambiguation) =

CISR is the Center for Insurance Studies and Research in India.

CISR may also refer to:

- Centre for Independent Social Research, nongovernmental research institute in St Petersburg, Russia
- Center for International Stabilization and Recovery, formerly Mine Action Information Centre
- Center for Invasive Species Research, at the University of California, Riverside
