= Graduate enrollment management =

Higher education strategy

Graduate Enrollment Management (GEM) is an area of Enrollment management focused on graduate and professional education.

== History ==
In 2013, the National Association of Graduate Admissions Professionals (NAGAP), changed its name to NAGAP, The Association for Graduate Enrollment Management and in 2014 the term started to gain more traction, appearing in publications from both NAGAP and American Association of Collegiate Registrars and Admissions Officers (AACRAO) as well as on their websites.

== Definition ==
In 2014, NAGAP, based on the findings of its Research and Global Issues Committee (Joshua LaFave, Christopher Connor, Ariana Balayan, Matthew Cipriano and Erinn Lake) rolled out the following definition for graduate enrollment management: graduate enrollment management is a systematic approach to managing enrollment and the graduate student lifecycle from awareness to alumnus by integrating the core functions associated with the support of a graduate student. GEM represents a synthesis of traditional student support areas into seamless, cross-functional operations designed to integrated stakeholders, consolidate key assessment mechanisms, and bolster service levels.

A longer definition of GEM followed: graduate enrollment management (GEM) represents a comprehensive approach to the methods by which an institution recruits, admits, supports, retains, and graduates post-baccalaureate students in their respective degree programs. This dynamic paradigm includes codependent functions working congruently to strategically manage overall enrollment levels and the student experience. These include enrollment planning, marketing, recruitment and admissions, advisement/coaching, financial aid, student services, retention, and alumni relations.

Regardless of staffing levels, integrated interdependence in GEM will ideally create an environment whereby a cross-trained professional from a graduate office is able to support a student throughout their time at the institution. This approach creates an environment that sustains differentiated student experiences.

In 2015, NAGAP released a white paper by Christopher Connor, Joshua LaFave, and Ariana Balayan. Integrated Interdependence: The Emergence of Graduate Enrollment Management.

In January 2022, AACRAO released “The Evolution of Graduate Enrollment Management” written by Ariana Balayan, Christopher Connor and Joshua LaFave which was published in the SEM Quarterly (SEMQ) journal.

== Organizations ==
A number of organizations focus on the field of GEM. Some of the more prominent organizations are:

- AACRAO, American Association of Collegiate Registrars and Admissions Officers
- NAGAP, the Association for Graduate Enrollment Management
- NASPA, National Association of Student Personnel Administrators
- EAIE, European Association for International Education
- ACA, Academic Cooperation Association

== See also ==
- Strategic Enrollment Management
- Enrollment management
