= Survivor Corps =

Survivor Corps, formerly known as the Landmine Survivors Network, was a global network of survivors helping survivors to recover from war, rebuild their communities, and break cycles of violence. The organization operated programs in Albania, Armenia, Azerbaijan, Bosnia-Herzegovina, Burundi, Colombia, Croatia, El Salvador, Ethiopia, Georgia, Jordan, Kosovo, Macedonia, Montenegro, Serbia, Uganda, Rwanda, the United States and Vietnam.

Survivor Corps was a proponent of the peer support method, in which survivors are linked to one another to share information as well as emotional and practical support, and work together on issues affecting their lives. The Survivor Corps peer support program connected survivors with survivor role models to offer encouragement and motivation.

Survivor Corps also brought conflict survivors together to promote reconciliation and rebuilding through community service projects and local activism.

In May 2008, Survivor Corps emerged from Landmine Survivors Network. The name change reflects the expansion of the organization's mission to include all types of survivors of global conflict and war, including United States service members and veterans returning from the wars in Iraq and Afghanistan.

The organization closed in 2010.

== Nobel Prize and international leadership ==
Survivor Corps has long played a leading role the International Campaign to Ban Landmines coalition (ICBL), which has over 1100 member organizations and whose goal is to abolish the production and use of anti-personnel landmines. Survivor Corps co-founders Jerry White and Ken Rutherford helped lead the coalition's efforts that secured the 1997 Mine Ban Treaty, which in turn earned the coalition the Nobel Peace Prize. Prominent Survivor Corps supporters have included Queen Noor of Jordan and Diana, Princess of Wales.

The Mine Ban Treaty bans the use, stockpiling, production and trade of antipersonnel mines. It was also the first arms control agreement in history to require governments to provide assistance to victims of the weapon. This was achieved by an unprecedented level of participation by survivors in the treaty process.

The Convention on the Rights of Persons with Disabilities entered into force on May 3, 2008, affecting 650 million people with disabilities around the world, including survivors of violent conflict. Survivor Corps helped ensure that this progressive human rights treaty addressed persons with disabilities not as charity cases, but as equal and autonomous citizens entitled to their human rights and full participation in society.

The Convention on Cluster Munitions was signed in Oslo on December 3, 2008, and entered into force on August 1, 2010. It bans the use, stockpiling, production and trade of cluster bombs due to the indiscriminate harm they cause to civilians. As a leader on the steering committee of the Cluster Munitions Coalition, Survivor Corps used its past experience with the Mine Ban Treaty to help ensure that the Convention on Cluster Munitions included the strongest possible requirements to provide assistance to victims of the weapon, their families and communities.

== Legacy ==
Over the course of several years, Survivor Corps established the first database designed to track the rehabilitation needs of mine victims and the resources available to help survivors, their families, and the communities affected by anti-personnel mines.

In 1997, Diana, Princess of Wales visited Bosnia with LSN co-founders Jerry White and Ken Rutherford to meet landmine survivors. Her high-profile tour of the war-torn country brought global media attention and public support to the issue of landmines. After the death of Diana, the organization became the only American-based charity to receive support from the Diana, Princess of Wales Memorial Fund. Also in 1997, Queen Noor of Jordan stepped in to take a prominent role in supporting the organization's work.

In 1999, along with Queen Noor and key members of the United States Congress, including Senator Patrick Leahy, the organization drew international attention to the refusal of the United States to sign the Mine Ban Treaty, while appealing to the US to revisit landmine policy.

From 1997 to 2007, LSN provided health support, economic opportunity and human rights advocacy for survivors of landmines around the world.

== Landmine Survivors Network becomes Survivor Corps ==
In May 2008, Landmine Survivors Network changed its name to Survivor Corps. The name change reflects the expansion of their mission to include all types of survivors of global conflict and war, including United States service members and veterans returning from the wars in Iraq and Afghanistan. Survivor Corps expanded its programs into Israel, Rwanda, Burundi, Uganda, and created additional projects in Colombia.

== Transition in 2010 ==
In early 2010 Survivor Corps elected to make its country programs in Vietnam, El Salvador and Bosnia into independent NGOs and to transfer its peer support resources to the Center for International Stabilization and Recovery located at James Madison University.

On September 30, 2010, Survivor Corps closed its headquarters office in Washington, DC.

== See also ==
- Cluster Munitions Coalition
- Convention on Cluster Munitions
- Convention on the Rights of Persons with Disabilities
- International Campaign to Ban Landmines
- Ottawa Treaty
- Ken Rutherford
- Jerry White
