= Evgeny Shtorn =

Russian activist

Evgeny Shtorn (Russian: Евгений Шторн) is an LGBT activist, organizer, scholar and poet.

Shtorn was born in Kazakh Soviet Socialist Republic in 1983 and moved to St.Petersburg, Russia in 2000 at the age of 17. He studied in Saint Petersburg State Electrotechnical University 'LETI' and in Russian State Institute of Performing Arts. He speaks and write in Spanish, English and Russian. In St. Petersburg he was working in the Centre for Independent Social Research with Viktor Voronkov and other prominent sociologists. He completed master's degree in sociology in Higher School of Economics under the supervision of Elena Omelchenko. In 2018 Shtorn was forced to leave Russia due to political repression from the Russian government under Vladimir Putin and the legislation against independent NGOs known as foreign agent law the Russian gay propaganda law that was enacted in 2013.

In 2018 Shtorn claimed international protection in the Republic of Ireland. He was initially sent to Balseskin Reception Center in Finglas where he started his first book 'Chronicles of Refugee' about life in direct provision. He was then relocated to Moate and shortly after to Galway, where he spent most of the time waiting for his asylum claim to be processed. He studied community development postgraduate diploma in NUI Galway He was granted refugee status in late 2019. He finished his book about direct provision in Galway, Ireland; He is a stateless person and refugee in Ireland. Despite all this he continues to engage in research and activism for the LGBT community in Ireland. Evgeny explores and studies the issues suffered by the LGBT population in Russia, as well as the state of living conditions in Ireland's direct provision system for refugees and his personal experience there. He is praised by his interviewees for his raw, personal poetry and analysis of the social issues he is involved with as well as studies.

== Early life ==
Shtorn was born in Kazakhstan in 1983 (known then as: Kazakh Soviet Socialist Republic). When Evgeny was a teenager, many young Russian-language speaking school graduates chose to travel from Kazakhstan to Russia for academic purposes. He moved to St.Petersburg in 2000 at the age of 17, and shortly afterwards came out as gay. He quickly identified with the LGBT population in St.Petersburg and became increasingly more involved in the community. Shtorn was a regular at popular gay nightclubs and engaged in other activities within the community where he is said to have realized that this was "my culture," "my music," "my style," and "this is where I feel comfortable."

== Seeking asylum and life in the direct provision ==
Shtorn was forced to leave Russia in 2018 and take asylum in Dublin, Ireland. He experienced a number of issues as he attempted to acquire his Russian citizenship before leaving the country.

When Shtorn became a student, he applied for his Russian passport and was able to get it quite easily. 10 years later he was told, without warning, that there was a problem and his passport had been issued improperly. Concerned for his status, Evgeny went to the Kazakhstan embassy in hopes to rectify the issues, but they rescinded his citizenship as well. This meant that he was now a stateless person. When you are a stateless person you lose your passport and your ability to travel. This affected him everyday; every policeman or states-person he comes into contact with could potentially stop him and looks at his papers and instantly know that "something is wrong."

Despite this experience, Russia did eventually explain to Shtorn that he had options for citizenship application: he can stay in the country on a residency permit and apply for a passport in 5 years; he cannot break any laws and he has to work. While living on a residency permit, the individual is required to report back to states-people on regular basis.

Shtorn got a job at the same N.G.O as his partner Alexander Kondakov at the Centre for Independent Social Research. Yet, this job turned into a political confrontation in 2015 when "the Justice Ministry added the TsNSI to the list of “foreign agents”- organizations that receive financing from abroad and, in the authorities’ opinion, are engaged in political activity."

While Putin is enforcing the Russian gay propaganda law, the government is also working to dismantle N.G.O institutions. The Russian foreign agents law requires that N.G.O's who receive foreign funding submit specific reporting requirements. This set limitations to the research occurring at Centre for Independent Social Research where Evgeny and his partner Alexander work, as the centre ended up on a list for government surveillance.

Things began to take a turn for the worse when Shtorn received a call from the Russian migration service informing him that there was a problem with his application and he must come into their offices to discuss it. When Shtorn arrived, he was led to a room on the first floor that had nothing but a camera, and a large portrait of Yuri Andropov. The man then shows Evgeny his FSB (Federal Security Agency) ID card, which is the successor agency to the KGB. Evgeny is reported saying he was kept by the FSB agent for 2 hours, they discussed his masters thesis and his studies in the LGBT field; the murder of gay men and the work of the Centre for Independent Social Research. It soon became clear that the man wanted Evgeny to be an informant for foreign individuals involved with the N.G.O centre:

"Basically his main attitude was very polite, but in a kind of very subtle, tender way he mentioned the law on espionage and the law of the traitor of motherland. My main goal was to get out of there but also not to damage other people."

He explained in a New Yorker interview that his safety, his privacy and his agency were violated as the Russian government was attempting to use him as an informant. He took the next flight out to Ireland.

It is reported that Ireland is generally an accepting country for those seeking Asylum, especially LGBT individuals - with the Prime Minister (Irish: Taoiseach) Leo Varadkar being a member of the LGBT community himself. However, Ireland has one of the slowest asylum processes in the world. Direct provision in Ireland can be described as a network of hotels, buildings and services that directly provide support to refugees and asylum seekers which are run by private companies, but funded by the state. Those living under direct provision are usually unable to work, are provided with very little and can end up living within the limbo of precariousness and unapproved citizenship status for years on end.

On April 29, 2020, Shtorn wrote a personal account of his experiences at the direct provision in Ireland:

"Direct provision transforms Ireland into a place of a traumatic experience for those who came here seeking sanctuary and protection but received years of indecision, it is a constant headache that never ends. But direct provision is not exclusively about those who ended up living in it. From my point of view, it is primarily about public resources and, at the end of the day, a concept of power – politicians facilitate the abuse of the most vulnerable people when they distribute public money to benefit private companies rather than think about how to protect human rights. Protecting people from life-threatening circumstances is not a business and it should not be about money."

== LGBT activism in Russia and the Russian Gay Propaganda Law ==
In 2013 Vladimir Putin and the federal parliament pass a ban on what can be described as propaganda of homosexuality or non-traditional sexual relations. There cannot be positive or neutral coverage of anything LGBT related. This includes no public demonstrations - the government also refuses to recognize or legally legitimize any pride parades or events. The Russian gay propaganda law claims that it operates "for the Purpose of Protecting Children from Information Advocating for a Denial of Traditional Family Values."

This law has been dangerous for many members of the LGBT community in Russia: hate crimes increased, according to Evgeny Shtorn's research and other sources. While Russian government is enforcing this ban, it is also working to dismantle N.G.O institutions. The Russian foreign agents law requires N.G.O's that receive foreign funding to submit to specific reporting requirements, this set limitations to the research occurring at Centre for Independent Social Research where Evgeny work when the centre ends up on a list for government surveillance. This means that Evgeny who is working at a foreign funded N.G.O centre, living as a stateless person studying LGBT issues is then faced with great difficulty after applying for his Russian passport after the 5-year wait on residency permit.

== Poetry, publications and academia ==
Although Evgeny has not published his own collection, he is instrumental in the LGBT and poetry community in Ireland. Many of his works are in Russian and describe the horrors, the discomforts and the extreme loneliness felt living under direct provision conditions, and experiencing the general plight and frustration of statelessness and oppression.

He has collaborated with other writers in collections, the most accessible and recent one is Writing Home: The New Irish Poets. Published by Dedalus Press.

"Translating Myself (Translated from Original Spanish)"

I do not write in Russian

because I'm not able

without this healthy distance

that offers me a language

loved and alien

Evgeny included an end-note with this poem from Writing Home: The New Irish Poets.

"[The poem] was initially written in Spanish, my first foreign language, as a way to say goodbye to it, while I was submerging myself in English. And both texts were my first self-translation into English with generous proofreading from Sarah Clancy."

In addition to his creative works, Evgeny has completed his master's degree in contemporary social analysis at Higher School of Economics studying the hate crimes against LGBT members, and murders of gay men. Focusing mainly on how these people were killed and oppressed in Russia. Evgeny is quoted in a New Yorker article in June, 2019 saying "the homophobia is in very private spaces and this was my main finding." Evgeny's finding was in direct contradiction to the governments message which essentially highlights that one can practice and engage in whatever they want in the privacy of their own home - as long as it does not corrupt the children via public display. However, Evgeny's research disproved this assumption and state message by proving that violence was coming into people's homes.

Prior to Evgeny's completion of his masters thesis, he received a diploma from the New Economic School in development of endowments. His undergrad was completed between the years of 2000-2005 when he first moved to Russia, at the Saint Petersburg Electrotechnical University (LETI). He has completed volunteer work as a researcher for the National Agency of Collaborative Arts (CREATE) In Dublin from February 2019 to present day, as well as offered his services in a part-time position as a project coordinator at the National Gallery of Ireland from May 2019 to present day, working on a community project "Something from There" with people seeking asylum. In addition to these two positions, he also works as the manager for Queer Diaspora a service that supports the LGBT community across Ireland.

== Honours and awards ==
- GALAS Person of the Year Award

== Personal life ==
While Evgeny Shtorn was living in St.Petersburg, he met his current partner Alexander Kondakov; a PHD scholar in sociology and LGBT activist as well. Evgeny and Alexander had a room in a communal apartment together in St. Petersburg and they also adopted a cat.

In St.Petersburg; during the mid-2000s, the gay movement was beginning to develop on a wider and more pronounced scale. People were becoming more open and more LGBT spaces began appearing - not just spaces in bars or nightlife, but in research, academia, discussion groups, film festivals. Evgeny was heavily involved throughout all of these progressive changes. However, Evgeny describes his life in Russia during these times as "living in a bubble" or in the "bubble of the N.G.O" because he was surrounded by his non-judgemental community and is reported saying that it was very different outside this bubble.

After fleeing Russia and seeking asylum in Ireland, Evgeny began living within the direct provision system. He has a small bed and small living space, he cannot have overnight guests, he gets 3 meals a day (but cannot cook). Alexander is not in Ireland with Evgeny, Alexander explains: "I would go wherever he is, right, but I'm just a citizen of Russia. I have to get a visa to any country I want to visit." Russian-American journalist Masha Gessen states in a New Yorker interview she did with Alexander and Evgeny that "if they were a straight couple, who had been together for 15 years, they would probably be married and there probably wouldn't be a question of whether they are seeking asylum together."

When Gessen asks Evgeny what is preventing him from seeing the future he responds with "Tiredness. I'm very tired. You know the feeling, to wake up tired after sleeping 10 hours you wake up and you are tired? This is the type of tiredness I have."

Evgeny is currently taking a course at the University of Galway, he spends his days studying in the library, researching for his two creative positions and his managerial duties for the Queer Diaspora. He is writing poetry, collaborating with other poets in Ireland. He writes about topics such as his experience taking asylum, living in the direct provision, his struggle with oppression in Putin's Russia and the imperative value in fighting for human dignity and the right to live and love with freedom and joy.
