= Ken Rutherford =

Ken Rutherford may refer to:

- Ken Rutherford (political scientist) (born 1962), co-founder of the Landmine Survivors Network; political science researcher
- Ken Rutherford (cricketer) (born 1965), New Zealand cricketer
