= E-pek@k =

e-pek@k is a project that facilitates the usage of information and communication technologies to provide the services for the hearing impaired community (fully and partially) in Malaysia.

== Deaf organizations in Malaysia ==
=== State level ===
==== Kuala Lumpur Society of the Deaf (KLSD) ====
Kuala Lumpur Society of the Deaf (officially abbreviated as KLSD, and known as Persatuan Orang Pekak Kuala Lumpur in Malay) is known officially since 1994. It was initially known as Society of Hearing Impaired Federal Territory and Selangor (SHIMA) when it was established on 23 June 1987. In 1992, Selangor split from SHIMA and changed its name to Society of Hearing Impaired Federal Territory. KLSD is the third deaf organizations to be formed in Malaysia. The first two deaf organizations are the National Society for the Deaf (NSD) and YMCA Deaf Club Kuala Lumpur. These organizations are all organized by the hearing impaired community themselves.

- Perlis Deaf Association (PERDA)

PERDA was previously known as Persatuan Orang Pekak Negeri Perlis (POPNPs) before registration. At that time, they only met with the deaf community for activities or events. Upon consultation with other associations including MFD, they registered with Pendaftar Penubuhan on 27 August 2001 with the name PERDA, a name that was suggested by the president of MFD. PERDA was then recognised as a registered association on 11 March 2002.

- Selangor Association of the Hearing Impaired (POCPS)

POCPS was established on 1 December 1993. They were a non-registered association. They were known as Kelab Pekak Kelang (Klang Deaf Club) since 1973. This association is a self-help organisation which is fully managed by the deaf. The objectives of POCPS are to cultivate the deaf community and to help each person to become an independent in individual and always work hard to improve themselves.

- Persatuan Kebajikan Pekak Terengganu (PKPT)

PKPT was registered on 20 June 1974 and have been organising activities at the Sekolah Rendah Sultan Sulaiman 1, Kuala Terengganu. Deaf students in this school receive services and moral support from PKPT. The role of this organisation of this school for deaf students is to liaise with the Persatuan Ibu Bapa dan Guru (Parents and Teachers Association, PIBG). The members of this organisation themselves are mainly parents and the deaf community. PKPT helped build a mini hostel for the outstation students. This mini hostel can fit in 20 female and 20 male and the foods and drinks are provided by a volunteer family whom as well have a hearing-impaired child.

By the year 1984, all the management of the mini hostel was taken over by Jabatan Pendidikan Terengganu (Terengganu Education Department). Thus, PKPT has stopped all the activities in the school. During that time, many of the members/committee have been moving on. The organisation went dormant for 10 years. In the meantime, the deaf in Kuala Terengganu were assisted by the teachers of special classes in Sekolah Rendah Sultan Sulaiman 1, Kuala Terengganu.

Sekolah Kebangsaan Pendidikan Khas Kuala Terengganu was established on 1 May 1998. In the meanwhile, the PIBG of the school and the deaf people including Jabatan Kebajikan Masyarakat Negeri Terengganu has prepared a proposal and PKPT then become active again.

- Persatuan Orang Cacat Pendengaran Kelantan (POCPK)

POCPK is an NGO that was established on 24 September 1996 and is wholly managed by the deaf community. When it first started out, there were only 96 registered members from Kelantan. The number of the members has since increased. There were 338 registered members by March 2003. Hoping to help more of the deaf people from all around Kelantan, POCPK have launched various programmes to attract more members while providing information and news for the deaf community.

== Background of e-pek@k ==
There were not many communication facilities available for the deaf in Malaysia, making long-distance communication difficult. They couldn't use normal telephones and there were no text phones or fax machines in facilities for the deaf. The deaf would have to pay for regular phone lines and bear the additional expense of a fax machine. Although television is a visual application, it was almost useless to deaf viewers, as subtitles were non-existent.

Computers, integrated with the Internet, have the potential to be an effective medium for the hearing-impaired person to access information, news, services, job opportunities, and peer support. The internet can also be used as a medium for deaf users to communicate, using means other than the sign language, with anyone around the world, including those who are not hearing-impaired. The Malaysian Federation for the Deaf has noticed this potential and developed the e-pek@k project.

== Partners of e-pek@k ==
- Special Education Department
- Social Welfare Department
- Three local deaf NGOs
  - Kuala Lumpur Society of the Deaf (KLSD)
  - Selangor Association of the Hearing Impaired (POCPS)
  - Kuala Lumpur Society of Parents and Guardians of Deaf Children (PESIBA)
- Six special schools for the deaf in Klang Valley
  - Sekolah untuk Kanak-Kanak Pekak, Selangor
  - Sekolah Rendah Pendidikan Khas, Kuala Lumpur
  - Sekolah Rendah Pendidikan Khas, Kampung Baru
  - Sekolah Rendah Pendidikan Khas, Selangor
  - Sekolah Kebangsaan Sultan Alam Shah, Petaling Jaya
  - Sekolah Menengah Vokasional Khas, Shah Alam
- MIMOS Berhad
- Ministry of Health

== Description ==
e-pek@k project started out in November 2000 in Malaysia. All of the staff in MFD themselves are hearing-impaired persons. MFD also has strong links with different deaf NGOs and societies. Therefore, they can understand the needs of the deaf community and it will be very easy for them in doing needs analysis, program design, project implementation, training activities, etc.

=== Objectives ===
1. To connect and support hearing-impaired person in Malaysia
2. To advocate for the rights and needs of hearing-impaired persons with the relevant departments of the Malaysian government.
3. To raise awareness among the general public of hearing disabilities and the needs of hearing-impaired persons.
4. To improve and extend the current services provided by MFD

== Components of e-pek@k ==
There are 2 components in e-pek@k: 'D-administration' and 'D-schools'. 'D-administration' is a website that provides information, news from deaf community, services, job opportunities and facility for learning BIM for the deaf community. 'D-schools' are deaf schools preinstalled with ICT facilities, along with the provision of IT training and education by e-pek@k.

=== D-administration (D-Tadbir) ===
In the e-pek@k website, it provides the access to information and services as shown below:

- MySL – BIM: A place to learn sign language with pictorial presentations as well as video presentations
- MyDeaf: a link to MFD
- Sazali's Posting Board (Bicara Sazali): A web space where Mr Sazali, the president of MFD, post and shares his opinions or experiences.
- Announcement (Pengumuman)
- e-Services (e-Khidmat)
  - e-Register (Ahli Online): allows clients to register with local deaf NGOs
  - e-Interpreter (Jurubahasa Isyarat): allows clients to request the services of sign language interpreters to assist the communication between the deaf and the society
  - e-Counseling (Kaunseling): allows clients to make appointments for confidential, face-to-face, peer counseling services
  - e-Job (e-Kerja): a job network that seeks to place hearing-impaired persons in mainstream positions
  - SMS Bulletin (SMS Buletin): new bulletin source for the deaf community
- Hall of Success (Dewan Kejayaan)
  - A list of the successor from the deaf community and are categorized to: Local Graduates, Overseas Graduates, Leaders, Entrepreneurs, Students, Athlete, and Adventurer
- e-Interview (e-Temuduga): The interviews of the deaf persons which was conducted online and posted here by Leon Lim, one of the successor listed in Hall of Success
- e-Info: Local news or information related with the deaf
- e-Buy (e-Beli): clients can buy the books and CDs of BIM online
- News and events: Advertisement of upcoming events that are particularly relevant to hearing-impaired persons

During the implementation of e-pek@k project, MFD staff had provided training to the representatives of the deaf NGOs. The deaf NGO representatives in turn, are able to provide training to their own members as required.

=== D-schools (D-Sekolah) ===
The establishment of D-schools is to ensure the deaf students are IT-educated and prepare them for the computer age in their future. Thus they are able to participate in Malaysia's envisioned knowledge society. In this project, e-pek@k installed the ICT hardware in schools for the deaf. Besides that, e-pek@k staff also provided training and education for the deaf teachers and students as well. However, in the first stages of e-pek@k project, six schools for the deaf were installed with ICT centres.

The first step of e-pek@k project is to sell the idea to the school administrators, teachers, students and parents. e-pek@k staff does this by presenting awareness-raising sessions and offering hands-on experience.

Then, e-pek@k staff installs and supply the hardware mostly assisted by the most motivated school staff and students. Training of using different types of popular software applications are given to staff and students by the e-pek@k staff themselves and NGOs representatives. The e-pek@k staff also teaches and assists students to develop and maintain their own school website. For now, all six of the schools which are under the e-pek@k project already have their own websites, with contents full of helpful tutorials, public forums, news and events, etc.

The continuity and maintaining of IT centres later will be the schools' own responsibility.

== Achievement ==
As a result of e-pek@k project, many deaf students are now able to build and maintain their own website. With the assistance of ICT, the deaf are no longer invisible and limited by their handicap. Their voices are now able to be heard by the society. They now get access to all online services and receive moral support as much as they wanted.

The beneficiaries of e-pek@k are now more confident and have more chances to show off their abilities. They can now prove that they can be as good as everyone else. The teachers also have more faith in their abilities. Their overall results in school have improved. The traditional stigma of deaf students, of them being problematic students, always lagging in their studies even though they actually spend 8 years in primary school, can now be dispelled.

=== Award ===
On 24 October 2001, e-pek@k has received a special award from the Malaysian chapter of the United Nations (PBB Malaysia) in recognition of their ground-breaking work in helping this special needs group to bridge the digital divide. – from DAGS

== Expandability ==
e-pek@k project is now confined to the in Klang Valley. It will soon be able to expand nationally within the framework of the MFD. In order to expand globally, it will have to depend on the availability of a similar network of NGOs and services for the deaf in the international arena.

== Sustainability ==
e-pek@k is a non-profit organization; their sole financial support is from public donations to MFD. Hence, more funding is required to develop the project further. Similarly, there are no financial support for the maintenance and upgrade of hardware items that have been installed in D-schools. It will be dependent on the school community themselves and alone, if they agree to commit to this.

== Glossary ==
Pekak
is a Malay word which means deaf
NGO
stands for non-governmental organisation
BIM
stands for Bahasa Isyarat Malaysia which translates into Malaysian Sign Language. Sign language is a language for the deaf to communicate with each other by using hands, body, and facial movement. Thus, the recipient can receive the message visually. Sign language has different characteristics in different languages, cultures, religions, and geography. Hence the sign languages are different in every country and BIM is the sign language for the deaf in Malaysia.
BIM is a natural sign language that is created by the deaf according to the factors like their daily communication and their own cultures. Since its conception, The Pulau Pinang Federation School for the Deaf, BIM has been widely used as the medium of communication within the deaf community in this country.
