= Enrollment management =

High education plan to shape enrollment

Enrollment Management is a term that is used frequently in higher education to describe well-planned strategies and tactics to shape the enrollment of an institution and meet established goals. Plainly stated, enrollment management is an organizational concept and a systematic set of activities designed to enable educational institutions to exert more influence over their student enrollments.

Such practices often include marketing, admission policies, retention programs, and financial aid awarding. Strategies and tactics are informed by collection, analysis, and use of data to project successful outcomes. Activities that produce measurable improvements in yields are continued and/or expanded, while those activities that do not are discontinued or restructured. Technology has increasingly become central to enrollment management, with institutions adopting CRM platforms and automated communication tools to manage student inquiries, track application pipelines, and improve enrollment conversion rates. Competitive efforts to recruit students is a common emphasis of enrollment managers.

The numbers of s of multiple offices such as admissions, financial aid, registration, and other student services. Often these offices are part of an enrollment management division.

Some of the typical aims of enrollment management include:

- Improving yields at inquiry, application, and enrollment stages.
- Increasing net revenue, usually by improving the proportion of entering students capable of paying most or all of unsubsidized tuition ("full-pays")
- Increasing demographic diversity
- Improving retention rates
- Increasing applicant pools

According to Matthew Quirk:

More-advanced enrollment managers also tend to focus as much on retaining admitted students as on deciding whom to recruit and accept. They smooth out administrative hassles, guarantee at-risk students the advising and academic help they need, and ensure that the different parts of the university's bureaucracy work together to get students out the door with a degree.

== See also ==
- Strategic Enrollment Management
- Graduate enrollment management

== Notes ==
1. Answers.com "Enrollment Management in Higher Education"
2. ibid
3. Matthew Quirk, 2005 The Best Class Money Can Buy, The Atlantic Monthly, Nov. 2005
4. CSCSR "Parkland College Enrollment Management Model"
5. Matthew Quirk, op. cit.
