= Danny Bentley =

American politician

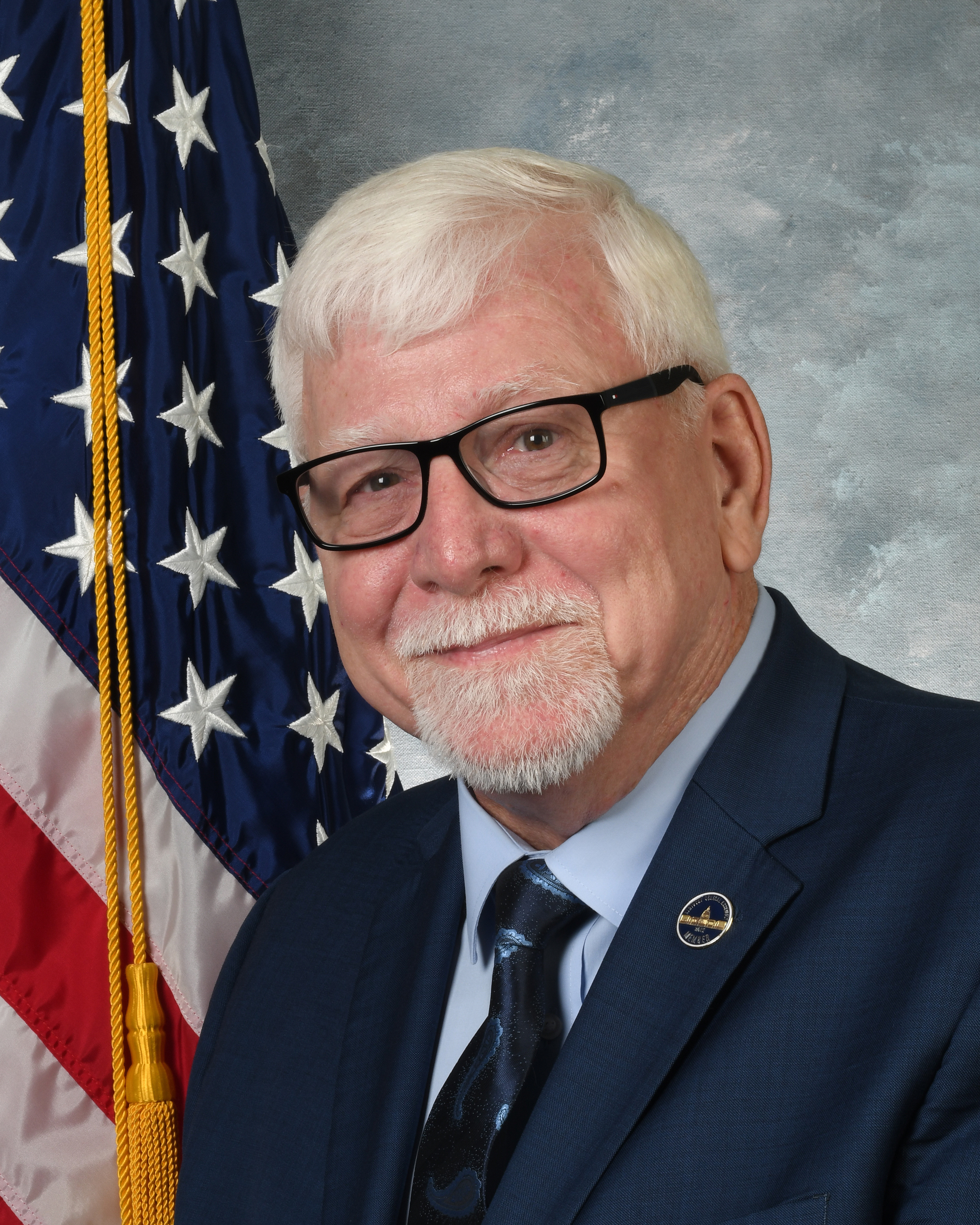

Member of the Kentucky House of Representatives from the 98th district
- In office January 1, 2017 – January 1, 2025
- Preceded by: Lew Nicholls
- Succeeded by: Aaron Thompson

Personal details
- Party: Republican
- Education: University of Kentucky (BS, PharmD)
- Occupation: Pharmacist

Danny R. Bentley is an American politician who served as a Republican member of the Kentucky House of Representatives from 2017 to 2025. He represented Kentucky's 98th House district which included Greenup County as well as part of Boyd County. He chose not to seek reelection in 2024.

== Background ==
Bentley was raised in South Shore, Kentucky, and attended McKell High School. While at McKell, Bentley played both football and baseball alongside future Cincinnati Reds pitcher and coach, Don Gullett. After graduating in 1968, he went on to attend Eastern Kentucky University before transferring to the University of Kentucky where he would earn both his Bachelor of Science and Doctor of Pharmacy degrees.

Following graduation, Bentley was employed by Revco for nearly 20 years before opening his own pharmacy in 1991. During this period, he also was employed as an assistant professor of biology at Ohio University's Southern Campus.

Bentley identifies as a Baptist, and is a deacon and trustee of the First Baptist Church of Russell. He is also a fellow of the American College of Apothecaries.

== Political career ==
=== Insulin advocacy ===
Bentley, who has type 2 diabetes himself, has been an active advocate for increased accessibility to insulin and diabetes care throughout his tenure. From 2018 to 2024, Bentley introduced or co-sponsored 10 measures related to diabetes care including an attempt to pass "Alec's Law" which would have established a program to provide either a 30-day or 12-month supply of insulin at a reduced cost to individuals whose insurance carriers stopped providing insulin coverage.

During the 2021 Kentucky General Assembly, Bentley introduced House Bill 95 which capped insulin co-pay costs at $30 for individuals on state health insurance plans. It passed both chambers unanimously and was signed into law by Governor Andy Beshear on March 22, 2021.

=== Controversy ===
During the 2022 Kentucky General Assembly, Bentley stated in a committee meeting that the abortion pill RU-486 was developed from the deadly chemical agent Zyklon B, and that the abortion pill was "invented by a Jew". He then went on a tangent about Jewish women's sexual habits.

"Did you know that a Jewish woman has less cancer of the cervix than any other race in this country or this world? And why is that? Because the Jewish women only have one sex partner."

Bentley was condemned by multiple Jewish groups and Governor Beshear. Bentley later apologized for his statements, and stated that he stood with the Jewish community against hatred.

=== Elections ===
- 2016 Bentley was unopposed in the 2016 Republican primary for Kentucky's 98th House district and won the 2016 Kentucky House of Representatives election with 9,823 votes (54.1%) against Democratic incumbent Lew Nicholls.
- 2018 Bentley was unopposed in the 2018 Republican primary and won the 2018 Kentucky House of Representatives election with 8,131 votes (55.4%) against Democratic candidate R. B. McKenzie.
- 2020 Bentley was unopposed in both the 2020 Republican primary and the 2020 Kentucky House of Representatives election, winning the latter with 16,536 votes.
- 2022 Bentley won the 2022 Republican primary with 3,495 votes (73%) and was unopposed in the 2022 Kentucky House of Representatives election, winning with 12,216 votes.
