= Michele Perkins =

American college administrator

15th President of New England College
- Incumbent
- Assumed office February 2007

Personal details
- Education: Northwestern University (B.S.); Emerson College (M.A.); University of Pennsylvania (Ed.D)

Michele D. Perkins is an American university administrator, who served as the 15th president of New England College.

== Education ==
She completed a bachelor's degree in theatre and performance studies from Northwestern University. She then earned a master's degree in communication from Emerson College. Perkins completed a doctorate in education in higher education management from University of Pennsylvania.

== Career ==
Perkins taught speech and drama at Emerson College and Curry College. She worked in admissions and enrollment management at White Pines College, New York Law School, Trinity College, and Emerson College.

Perkins has worked as an independent consultant on admissions marketing strategies and long-range planning. She is a co-founder of the NAGAP. Perkins joined New England College in 2001 as the vice president for enrollment. She became the senior vice president two years later. Perkins was appointed president in 2007.

== Personal life ==
Perkins resides in Henniker, New Hampshire with her husband and son.
