= Jerry White (activist) =

American activist

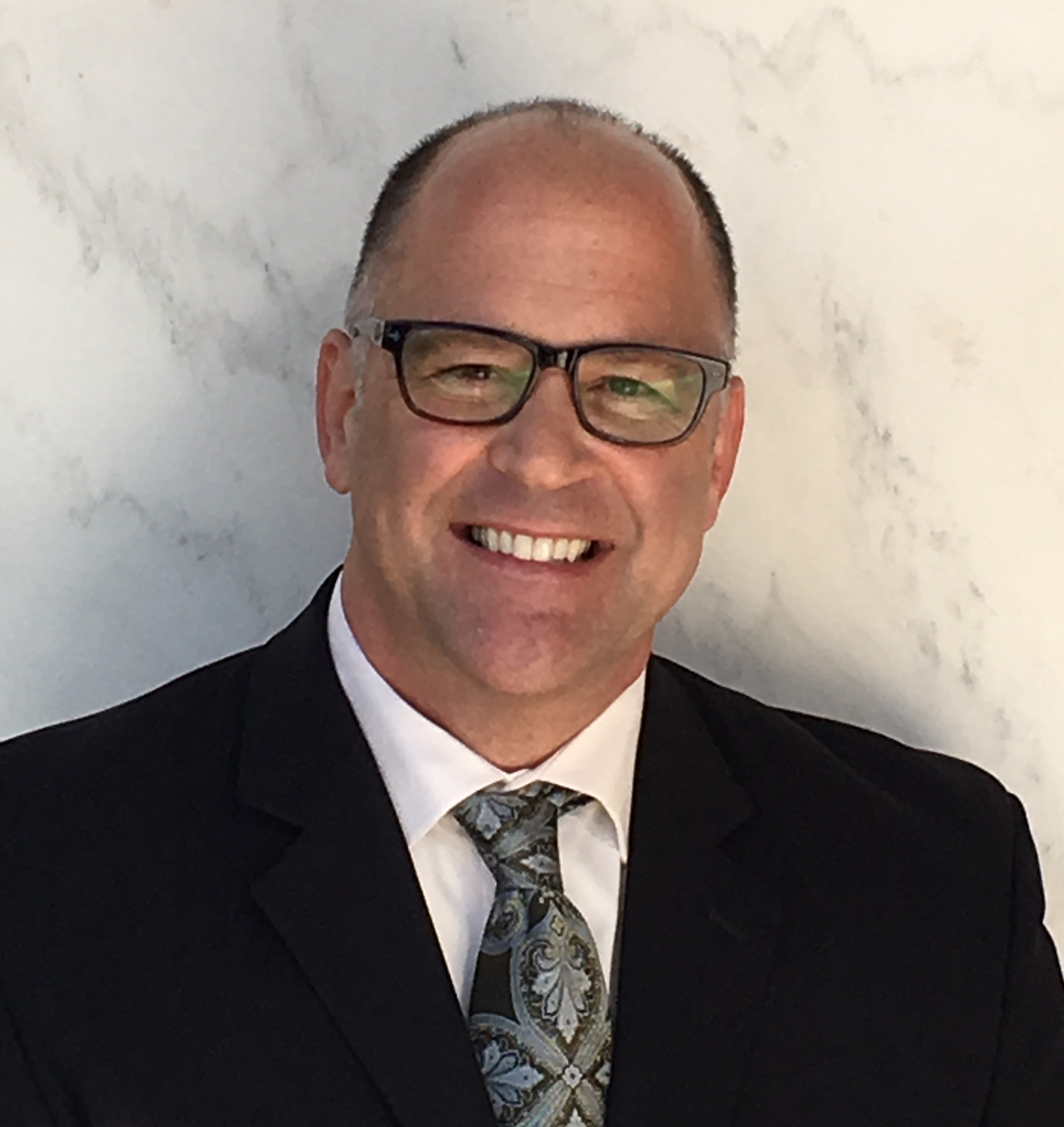
- Born: June 7, 1963 (age 63)
- Education: Brown University; University of Michigan
- Awards: Nobel Peace Prize (1997)

Jerry White (born June 7, 1963) recently served as Executive Director of the United Religions Initiative, and CEO of the URI Foundation. He co-founded the Survivor Corps, formerly the Landmine Survivors Network, created by and for survivors to help victims of war, and is a recognized leader of the International Campaign to Ban Landmines, which was the recipient of the 1997 Nobel Peace Prize. He was a Professor of Practice at the University of Virginia from 2015 to 2022. He is a Senior Ashoka Fellow and was a Gabelli Fellow at the Gabelli School of Business in New York City.

== Background ==
In 1984, while studying abroad in Jerusalem, White lost his lower right leg after stepping on a landmine during a backpacking trip. The mine had been laid by Syrian soldiers during the 1967 war.

Following this incident, White co-founded Survivor Corps with Ken Rutherford, where he led efforts to draft and enact human rights and humanitarian legislation, including the UN Convention on the Rights of Persons with Disabilities, promoting and protecting the rights of people with disabilities.

Through this work, White arranged for Diana, Princess of Wales, to visit Bosnia and Herzegovina, and later joined in efforts to promote a "mine-free Middle East" with King Hussein and Queen Noor of Jordan. In 2010, White received a Knesset vote in Israel to clear old minefields, including the Baptismal Site of Jesus on the Jordan River.

White has been published extensively, testified before the United States Congress and the United Nations, and received several awards in recognition of his humanitarian and human rights leadership, including the Lifetime Achievement Award from Glasgow Caledonian New York College in 2019, the University of Massachusetts-Boston Chancellor’s Medal for Global Service in 2016, the Rumi Award for Interreligious Diplomacy in 2015, the Superior Honor Award from the U.S. State Department in 2014, the Roots of Peace Global Humanitarian Award in 2010; the first International UNA Humanitarian Prize from Sir Paul McCartney and Heather Mills in 2003, the 2001 Paul G. Hearne American Association of People with Disabilities Leadership Award, the 2000 Mohammed Amin Humanitarian Award, Brown University's 2000 William Rogers Alumni Award, and the Center for International Rehabilitation's Leadership Award in 1999. He shares in the 1997 Nobel Peace Prize, awarded to the International Campaign to Ban Landmines and its first coordinator Jody Williams.

== Professional ==
White began his career at the Brookings Institution and at the Council on Foreign Relations, where he served as a research assistant. He later became Assistant Director of the Wisconsin Project on Nuclear Arms Control and an editor for Risk Report. In the late 1990s he served on the board of directors of the Amputee Coalition of America. In these positions White campaigned against weapons of mass destruction.

In 1995, White co-founded Landmine Survivors Network, later Survivor Corps, with Ken Rutherford, which pioneered improvements in war victim assistance, providing amputees with peer mentors, artificial limbs, and job training. White and Rutherford's leadership in the International Campaign to Ban Landmines helped secure the 1997 Mine Ban Treaty and the Cluster Munitions Ban Treaty.

Between 2010 and 2012 Jerry served as Executive Co-Chair of the Abraham Path Initiative with Founder William Ury.

In April 2012 White was appointed Deputy Assistant Secretary for Partnerships and Learning at the US State Department's Bureau of Conflict and Stabilization Operations (CSO). While at the CSO, he was responsible for strategic planning for the Bureau, and he introduced strategies to avoid violence in the Middle East and North Africa.

After leaving the State Department in January 2015, Jerry founded Global Impact Strategies Inc. (giStrat) and Global Covenant Partners (GCP). Global Covenant Partners is a small non-profit dedicated to preventing religion-related violence.

He joined the University of Virginia as a Professor of Practice in 2015, and taught a course titled Religion, Violence and Strategy: How to Stop Killing in the Name of God. His work with Professor Peter Ochs to inhibit religion-related violence across the Mideast and North Africa was profiled in Virginia Magazine’s “In the Name of God: UVA team develops new approach to battling religion-based violence.”

Since 2022, he has been the Executive Director of the United Religions Initiative, which promotes enduring, daily interfaith cooperation, the end of religiously motivated violence, and the creation of cultures of peace, justice, and healing for the Earth and all living beings.

== Personal ==
Jerry White used to live in the Mediterranean island of Malta with his wife Kelly and four children.

He holds a bachelor's degree from Brown University, a master's of business administration from the University of Michigan, an honorary doctorate from Mount Sinai School of Medicine, and a distinguished honorary professorship from Hiroshima University. In 2005 White delivered the commencement speech at the Ross School of Business, University of Michigan. In May 2010, White delivered the commencement address at the Mendoza Graduate School of Business, University of Notre Dame.
