= The Dinner Party (organization) =

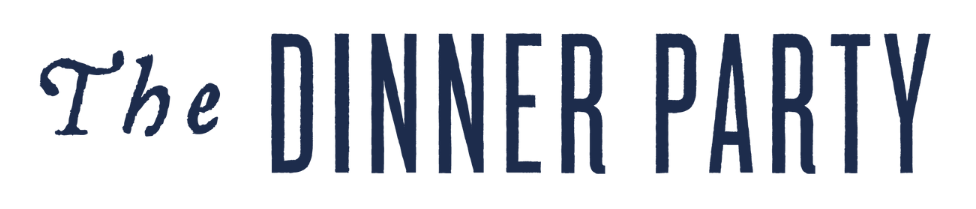
- Formation: 2010; 16 years ago
- Founders: Lennon Flowers; Carla Fernandez
- Founded at: Los Angeles, California, United States
- Type: Nonprofit
- Legal status: 501(c)(3)
- Purpose: Peer support for grieving young adults
- Headquarters: Los Angeles, California, United States
- Region served: United States and select international cities
- Members: About 4,000 (2018)
- Executive Director: Lennon Flowers
- Website: thedinnerparty.org

The Dinner Party is a non‑profit organization that hosts potluck dinner‑based peer support gatherings for young adults who have experienced loss.

Lennon Flowers serves as the Executive Director.

== History ==
The Dinner Party was founded in 2010 in Los Angeles by Lennon Flowers and Carla Fernandez, who had both lost a parent in their twenties. They organized the first dinner to connect young adults grieving the loss of loved ones. The organization later expanded to include groups for those who had lost friends, siblings, or partners, as well as individuals affected by suicide-related loss. In collaboration with OptionB.Org, founded by Sheryl Sandberg, The Dinner Party expanded its support to include a wider range of ages and types of loss.

By 2018, The Dinner Party had hosted approximately 10,000 participants and maintained around 4,000 regular members across more than 100 cities, including international locations such as Israel and Australia, which have since been closed.

== Dinners ==
The Dinner Party operates as a national community centered on potluck dinners for young adults grieving major losses.

Dinner Party events follow a consistent format with variations based on the host and participants. Hosts set the date and location, and guests bring a dish, often tied to a personal memory or a loved one who has died. Gatherings begin with informal socializing, followed by dinner. Hosts establish guidelines emphasizing confidentiality, voluntary participation, and nonjudgment. Facilitated discussions focus on topics such as holidays and anniversaries, changes in family dynamics, decision-making without a deceased loved one, and shifts in perspective after loss.

In March 2020, the COVID-19 pandemic prompted a shift from in‑person dinners to virtual gatherings. This transition enabled the formation of new groups, including those for individuals affected by homicide or addiction-related loss, and expanded participation across geographic boundaries.
