= Healing Through Creativity =

- Founded: 2005
- Purpose: Recovery from Trauma, Cancer, Sexual Abuse, Grief, Domestic Violence, Accidents, Disability
- Location: West Virginia, Virginia, United States
- Method: Annual Art Festival
- Key people: George R, Founder and President of the organization Tracey B, Vice President and Webmaster; Vicky, Treasurer; Ginger G, Board member
- Website: www.healingthroughcreativity.org

Healing Through Creativity abbreviated to HTC is an organization that holds an annual art, music, writing, poetry and other creative forms event each year in the states of West Virginia and Virginia, USA for survivors recovering from Trauma, Cancer, Sexual Abuse, Domestic Violence, Grief, Disability and Accidents. The event attracts international attention, with submissions taken for the event through the organization's website and PO. Box from all over the globe.

== Media ==
The highlight of past years was an interview conducted by US radio station, The Festival of the Arts, where event organizers George and Tracey gave an hour-long interview. On the 11th of June 2008, Healing Through Creativity made a media release entitled "Call for Artists and Performers for the Healing through Creativity Festival" which was the organization's method of attracting performers and artists to the annual event. Healing Through Creativity has said there has been a "healthy response" to the call for performers and artists at the 2008 event. The event continually releases press releases at the site and to local news outlets prior to the event start.

== Venue ==
HTC venues from year to year have been the "Museum in the Community," where the event was held in 2006-07, to "West Virginia State University" in 2008. In 2009, Grandin Gardens in Roanoke, Virginia and in 2010 two venues in Bramwell, West Virginia Town Hall and Grandin Gardens, Roanoke, Virginia.

== Promotion ==
The organization recently launched MySpace and Facebook profiles to help raise awareness of the event and connect with other similar organizations (and their members) as a way of promoting the annual event. The event also has a Twitter, WordPress and Blogger address. Promotion is achieved through social networking, flyers, brochures, word of mouth, outreach events and website.

HTC has also used support sites to connect with survivors of trauma, cancer, sexual abuse, grief, and accidents. Some of which are the AfterSilence and the Pandora's Aquarium ("Pandys") support forum and chat room sites for survivors of rape, sexual abuse, and sexual assault. "Pandys" is the world's largest survivor support site, and AfterSilence is the worldest 2nd largest survivor support site in the world, based on the number of posts by members.

== Supporters ==
The event supporters are West Virginia State University, Hampton, West Virginia Department of Health & Human Resources, and Holiday Inn Express, who covers some of the event costs, the remainder of the event costs are covered by the organizers and by individual/personal donations HTC also recently added as a “Donations” section to the website to help cover some of the website and event costs.

== Website ==
In 2006, HTC launched their website which is used as a means of communication with potential event attendees. Soon after launching the event website HTC launched a support forum and chat room as an extension to the event's website so that, in addition to the annual event, HTC runs the support forum and chat room as a means to offer support and communication to survivors.
