= Institutional research =

Institutional research is a broad category of work done at schools, colleges and universities to inform campus decision-making and planning in areas such as admissions, financial aid, curriculum assessment, enrollment management, staffing, student life, finance, facilities, athletics, and alumni relations.

Institutional researchers collect, analyze, report, and warehouse quantitative and qualitative data about their institution's students, faculty, staff, curriculum, course offerings, and learning outcomes. They are involved in collecting and reporting information to government bodies (for example, in the US, the United States Department of Education's Integrated Postsecondary Education Data System), to the public (e.g., Common Data Set, the National Association of Independent Colleges and Universities's University-College Accountability Network), and various college guide publishers (e.g., U.S. News & World Report and College Board). On occasion, institutional researchers share data with one another to compare their own practices and outcomes against those of similar institutions. Institutional research is the source of much of the information provided to regional and national accreditation bodies to document how institutions fulfill the standards for accreditation.

In addition to reporting, institutional researchers often engage in data analysis, ranging from simply testing whether differences in reported data are statistically significant to developing and using causal and predictive statistical models. Such models are often used in support of assessment and strategic enrollment management.

== Becoming an Institutional Researcher ==
Due to the need to provide data to the federal government and other entities, nearly every post-secondary institution has offices that fulfill the institutional research function. At some colleges and universities this function is centralized in a single office of institutional research, while at others it is more de-centralized. There is no single academic degree that qualifies one to be an institutional researcher, but suggested strengths include a knowledge of statistics, research methods (e.g., survey research and focus groups), and computer-based reporting and data visualization tools (e.g., SPSS, SAS, R, STATA, Microsoft Access, Microsoft Excel, MicroStrategy, and SQL). Other important assets are strong written and oral communications skills, attention to detail, and knowledge about how institutions of higher education operate. Several American universities offer graduate certificate programs in institutional research, including Ball State University, Florida State University, Humboldt State University, North Dakota State University, Penn State University, Indiana University, University of Missouri, University of Illinois, the University of Wisconsin - Stout, and the University of California San Diego Extension.
