= Free Cakes for Kids UK =

British children's community service

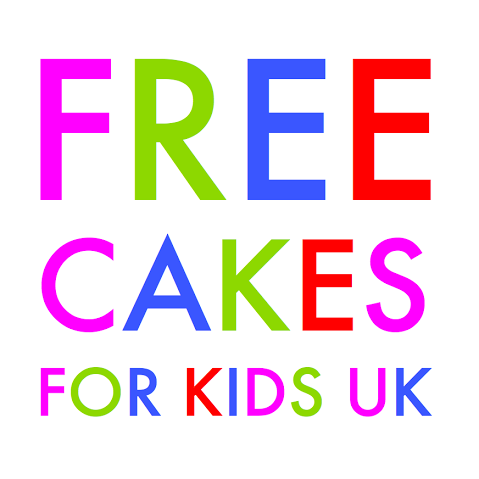
- Founded: 2008
- Founder: Henriette Lundgren
- Founded at: Oxford, England
- Registration no.: Company no.: 9375876
- Region served: United Kingdom
- Volunteers: ~1,400
- Website: freecakesforkids.org.uk

Free Cakes for Kids UK is a not-for-profit community service to families who find it difficult to provide a birthday cake for their child. Cakes are baked by volunteers, who operate in local and independent groups across the country.

== History ==
Free Cakes for Kids UK was founded in 2008 by Henriette Lundgren. Inspired by an article in People magazine about a similar initiative in the U.S., Lundgren started the first group in Oxford, England. The idea caught on quickly, and people from all over the country made contact to learn about the project. Overwhelmed by the number of inquiries, the Oxford group created a dedicated team to support new volunteers and start their own local groups.

Over the following years, the team developed a website to collect, research and share best practices about everything from food safety, legal questions and media support to organising an annual meeting of all group organizers. By 2014, there were more than 80 Free Cakes for Kids groups in England, Wales, Scotland and Northern Ireland with hundreds of volunteers and local partner organisations. After a long period of experimentation, the team found that the project would best be served not as a fully-fledged charity, but as a community of local groups held together by a shared idea, peer support and mutual accountability.

On 6 January 2015, Free Cakes for Kids was incorporated as a not-for-profit company limited by guarantee under English law. The organisation continues to provide support for new and existing groups through its website and the Free Cakes for Kids Cookbook, a shared resource with advice and ideas.

== Structure and organisation ==
A Free Cakes for Kids group matches two parties: amateur volunteer bakers and families in need. Families contact the group directly or are referred by a local partner organisation, such as food banks, social workers, schools and charities.

The cakes are baked by volunteers in their home kitchens and are often decorated with the child's favourite theme. Popular examples are Peppa Pig, Spider-Man and football-themed cakes. The cakes are free to the family while bakers pay for the ingredients, sometimes with the help of local sponsors. Finally, the baker and the family arrange a handover in a public place that is convenient to both.

In order to start a new group, an interested person first needs to visit the project website and consult the available materials. The so-called Cookbook contains the collected experience of past bakers and community organisers, including practical information about food safety, legal liability and volunteer management. The future group leader then needs to get in touch with two organisers of existing groups. The organisers will support the newcomer and, once they feel comfortable, provide the two public endorsements that are required to be listed on the website. This process ensures that knowledge is passed on and that support relationships are being built across the project.

== Social impact ==
Free Cakes for Kids groups have a number of social impacts in their local communities. This includes helping families in need and creating a memorable personal experience for birthday child. Families also tend to organize a birthday party around the often spectacular cakes, which benefits the wider community. In some cases, bakers and families, who tend to come from very different social backgrounds, have developed lasting relationships.

Given the distributed nature of the project, it is difficult to determine the number of cakes baked, families served or volunteers engaged. In August 2018, there were 80 groups listed for the project. While some groups may be as small as five volunteers, others have built substantial operations with more than 60 volunteers, with 300 volunteers in the East Midlands alone.

Some groups have expanded their activities, offering community decorating workshops or baking classes. Many Free Cakes for Kids groups and volunteers have won awards and public recognition for their work.
