= Maic =

Maic may refer to:

- Maic Malchow (born 1962), German cyclist
- Maic Sema (born 1988), Swedish football player
- Mine Action Information Center
