= Ken Rutherford (political scientist) =

American political scientist

Kenneth R. Rutherford
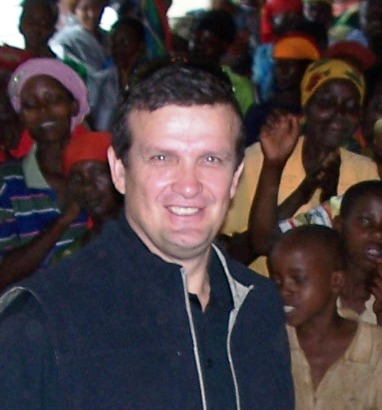
- Kenneth Rutherford on a visit to Burundi, May 2010
- Born: Oakland, California
- Education: University of Colorado Boulder, B.A., M.B.A. Georgetown University, Ph.D. (Political Science)
- Occupation: Professor
- Employer: James Madison University
- Known for: Advocacy for landmine survivors, work on the International Campaign to Ban Landmines, work the Convention on the Rights of Persons with Disabilities, work on the Convention on Cluster Munitions, work to limit small arms and light weapons, work on peer support for trauma survivors
- Awards: As co-founder of the Landmine Survivors Network, he was a renowned leader in the Nobel Peace Prize-winning coalition that spearheaded the 1997 Mine Ban Treaty, Nobel Peace Prize (1997); 2013–2014 Human Security Award (Center for Unconventional Security Affairs); Leadership in International Rehabilitation Award (Center for International Rehabilitation, 1999); Survivors' Assistance Award (Marshall Legacy Institute, 2005); Everyday Hero Award (United Airlines, 2002); Adopt-A-Minefield Humanitarian Award (2002); Missouri Public Affairs Hall of Fame (Missouri State University, 2026)

Kenneth R. Rutherford is an American political science professor at James Madison University, co-founder of the Survivor Corps (a group that helps victims of war), and a researcher in the field of political science. He is a member of the International Campaign to Ban Landmines, which was the recipient of the 1997 Nobel Peace Prize. Rutherford has served as the Director of the James Madison University Center for International Stabilization and Recovery, a Peace Corps Volunteer in Mauritania (1987–1989), a United Nations High Commissioner for Refugees Emergency Refugee Coordinator in Senegal (1989), and a humanitarian emergency relief officer in northern Kenya and Somalia (1993). In 2024, Rutherford taught at Hue University in Vietnam as a Fulbright Scholar Fellow.

== International work ==
While studying political science at the University of Colorado Boulder in the mid-1980s, Rutherford decided to work in international development. Since graduating in 1985, he has worked for international aid agencies in Bosnia, Kenya, Mauritania, Senegal and Somalia, and was a Fulbright Scholar in Jordan and Vietnam.

Rutherford began his international career as a Peace Corps volunteer in Mauritania (1987–1989). During this period he was contracted by the United Nations High Commissioner for Refugees to assist in refugee camps on the border between Mauritania and Senegal.

He returned to the United States to earn his Executive Master of Business Administration at the University of Colorado, then in 1993 went to work for the International Rescue Committee in Kenya and Somalia, where he was injured by a landmine.

Together with Jerry White he co-founded Landmine Survivors Network in 1995 which later became Survivor Corps. He and White accompanied Princess Diana on her last humanitarian mission to visit landmine survivors in Bosnia-Herzegovina in August 1997, only three weeks before her death. Rutherford was a prominent leader in the International Campaign to Ban Landmines which won the 1997 Nobel Peace Prize. In 2000, he earned his doctorate in political science from Georgetown University.

He was associate professor of political science at Missouri State University from 2002 until 2010. In 2005, Rutherford went to Jordan on a Fulbright Fellowship where he taught international politics at the University of Jordan in Amman.

In 2008, Rutherford played a role in the drafting of the Convention on the Rights of Persons with Disabilities and the Convention on Cluster Munitions. He was a board member of Survivor Corps until it closed in September 2010.

In February 2010, Rutherford became Director of the Center for International Stabilization and Recovery (CISR), which includes the Mine Action Information Center, at James Madison University. In his capacity as CISR Director, he oversaw and participated in post-conflict missions and projects in numerous countries worldwide, including Burundi, Iraq, Tajikistan and Vietnam.

== Landmine accident ==
On December 16, 1993, while working for the International Rescue Committee in Somalia, Rutherford's vehicle struck a landmine, injuring him severely. After a medical evacuation during which he nearly bled to death, one leg was amputated to save his life and the second one amputated several years later. He has since spoken to the United States Congress against landmines. "It was an experience that fundamentally altered my life for the good," Rutherford said. "It crystallized my vision of what I believe I was put on this Earth to do."

Following this incident, Rutherford focused his advocacy efforts to draft and enact prohibitions on anti-personnel landmines (1997 Anti-Personnel Mine Ban Treaty) and cluster munitions (2008 Cluster Munitions Convention), and promoted the rights and dignity of people with disabilities, resulting in the 2006 Convention on the Rights of People with Disabilities.

Together with Jerry White he co-founded Survivor Corps in 1995 which pioneered improvements in war victim assistance, providing amputees with peer mentors, artificial limbs, and job training. White and Rutherford's leadership in the International Campaign to Ban Landmines helped secure the 1997 Mine Ban Treaty and the Cluster Munitions Ban Treaty.

== Publications ==
=== Articles ===
Ken Rutherford has been published extensively in numerous academic and policy journals, including the Journal of International Law and Policy, World Politics, Journal of International Politics, International Journal of World Peace, Alternatives, Non-Proliferation Review, Harvard International Review, The Journal of ERW and Mine Action, Journal of Transnational Associations, Pain Medicine, International Journal on Grey Literature, and Security Dialogue. He has contributed book reviews to Armed Forces and Society, and National Security Studies Journal.

=== Books ===
Rutherford is the author of Humanitarianism Under Fire: The US and UN Intervention in Somalia, (2008) and Disarming States: The International Movement to Ban Landmines (2011). He has co-edited two books: Reframing the Agenda: The Impact of NGO and Middle Power Cooperation in International Security Policy (2003) and Landmines and Human Security: International Politics and War's Hidden Legacy (2004).

- America's Buried History: Landmines in the Civil War, (Savas Beatie Press, April 2020) endorsed by His Royal Highness Prince Mired Raad Al-Hussein, United Nations Special Envoy for Landmine Prohibition Treaty; U.S. Senator Patrick Leahy; and Jody Williams, Nobel Peace Prize Laureate (1997) and Chair, Nobel Women's Initiative.
- Disarming States: The Global Movement to Ban Landmines, (Praeger Press, December 2010) endorsed by Ambassador Lincoln P. Bloomfield, Jr, Chairman, Henry L. Stimson Center and former Assistant Secretary of State for Political Military Affairs; U.S. Senator Patrick Leahy; Jody Williams, Nobel Peace Prize Laureate (1997); and, Ambassador Karl F. Inderfurth, former U.S. Special Representative for Global Humanitarian Demining.
- Humanitarianism Under Fire: The US and UN Intervention in Somalia, (Kumarian Press, 2008) endorsed by George E. Shambaugh, Chairman of the Department of Government, Georgetown University; Richard Mathew, Director, Center for Unconventional Security Affairs, University of California, Irvine; U.S. Senator Patrick Leahy; Jody Williams, Nobel Peace Prize Laureate (1997)
- Human Security and Landmines: International Politics and War's Hidden Legacy, eds. with Richard Matthew and Bryan McDonald (State University of New York Press, 2004, paperback 2006)
- Reframing the Agenda: The Impact of NGO and Middle Power Cooperation on International Security Policy, with Stefan Brem and Richard Mathew (Greenwood Press, 2003); Forwards by Her Majesty Queen Noor, The Honorable Lloyd Axworthy, Lady Heather Mills McCartney and Sir Paul McCartney, and U.S. Senator Patrick Leahy.

=== Book chapters and contributions ===
Rutherford has contributed chapters to Negotiating Sovereignty and Human Rights, Global Society in Transition: An International Politics Reader, Civil Society in the Information Age, The Landmine Action Smart Book, Primary Care of Landmine Injuries in Africa: A Basic Text for Health Workers, Landmine Monitor Report 2000, and To Walk Without Fear: The Global Movement to Ban Landmines. Rethinking Sovereignty and Human Rights after the Cold War; Routledge Handbook of Environmental Security; Co-operating Without America: Theories and Case-Studies of Non-Hegemonic Regimes; Encyclopedia of Human Rights; Arms Control History, Theory, and Policy.

Rutherford also contributed to the chapter on Bosnia-Herzegovina in the 1998 Report for Special Operations and Low Intensity Conflict Office. One the 20th anniversary of the Anti-Personnel Mine Ban Convention, Rutherford co-authored (with Firoz Alizada, Anti-Personnel Mine Ban Convention Implementation Support Unit "Victim assistance: There is a face and name behind each casualty," in The Anti-Personnel Mine Ban Convention: Twenty Years of Saving Lives and Preventing Indiscriminate Harm published by the United Nations Office of Disarmament Affairs.

== Awards, honors and public appearances ==
The organization he was associated with, International Campaign to Ban Landmines, shared the 1997 Nobel Peace Prize. Rutherford was co-recipient of the 1999 Leadership in International Rehabilitation Award presented by the Center for International Rehabilitation and has been inducted into the University of Colorado Heritage Center's "Hall of Excellence," a permanent exhibit at the University of Colorado. He has received the Marshall Legacy Institute's 2005 Survivors' Assistance Award, the 2002 United Airlines Everyday Hero Award, and the 2002 Adopt-A-Minefield Humanitarian Award. Rutherford is also the 2013–2014 recipient of the Human Security Award from the Center for Unconventional Security Affairs (CUSA)] at the University of California, Irvine.

As an advocate for people with disabilities affected by landmines, he has presented in more than 30 countries, testifying before U.S. Congress and the United Nations (New York City and Geneva). He has also appeared on Dateline, Nightline, The View and National Public Radio's Morning Edition and All Things Considered. His personal story of recovering from his accident to pursue his dreams of marrying his fiancée, having children and becoming a professor has been profiled by The Oprah Winfrey Show, Reader's Digest and the BBC.

In June 2013, he was included among the "one hundred most influential people in armed violence reduction" by the London-based organization Action on Armed Violence]
