= Tanya Pullin =

American politician, member of the Kentucky House of Representatives

Member of the Kentucky House of Representatives from the 98th district
- In office January 1, 2001 – January 1, 2016
- Preceded by: Hoby Anderson
- Succeeded by: Lew Nicholls

Personal details
- Born: September 15, 1957 (age 69) South Shore, Kentucky
- Party: Democratic
- Education: University of Kentucky; Duke University; University of Kentucky College of Law
- Profession: Attorney

Tanya Pullin (born September 15, 1957) is an American politician who was Democratic member of the Kentucky House of Representatives representing district 98 from 2001 to 2016. She resigned from the house in January 2016 after being appointed to an administrative law judgeship by governor Matt Bevin.

== Education ==
Pullin earned her BS from the University of Kentucky, her MA from Duke University, and her JD from the University of Kentucky College of Law.

== Elections ==
- 2000 To challenge District 98 incumbent Republican Representative Hoby Anderson, Pullin was unopposed for the 2000 Democratic Primary and won the November 7, 2000 General election with 8,160 votes (56.9%) against Representative Anderson.
- 2002 Pullin and former Representative Anderson were both unopposed for their 2002 primaries, setting up a rematch; Pullin won the November 5, 2002 General election with 5,798 votes (57.1%) against former Representative Anderson.
- 2004 Pullin was unopposed for both the 2004 Democratic Primary and the November 2, 2004 General election, winning with 11,178 votes.
- 2006 Pullin was challenged in the three-way 2006 Democratic Primary, winning with 4,700 votes (81.1%) and was unopposed for the November 7, 2006 General election, winning with 9,825 votes.
- 2008 Pullin was unopposed for both the 2008 Democratic Primary and the November 4, 2008 General election, winning with 12,606 votes.
- 2010 Pullin was unopposed for both the May 18, 2010 Democratic Primary and the November 2, 2010 General election, winning with 9,049 votes.
- 2012 Pullin was challenged in the May 22, 2012 Democratic Primary, winning with 2,444 votes (74.0%) and unopposed in the November 6, 2012 General election, winning with 12,283 votes.
- 2014 Pullin was unopposed for both the May 20, 2014 Democratic Primary and the November 4, 2014 General election, winning with 9,961 votes.
