= Aaron Thompson (politician) =

Kentucky politician (born 1991)

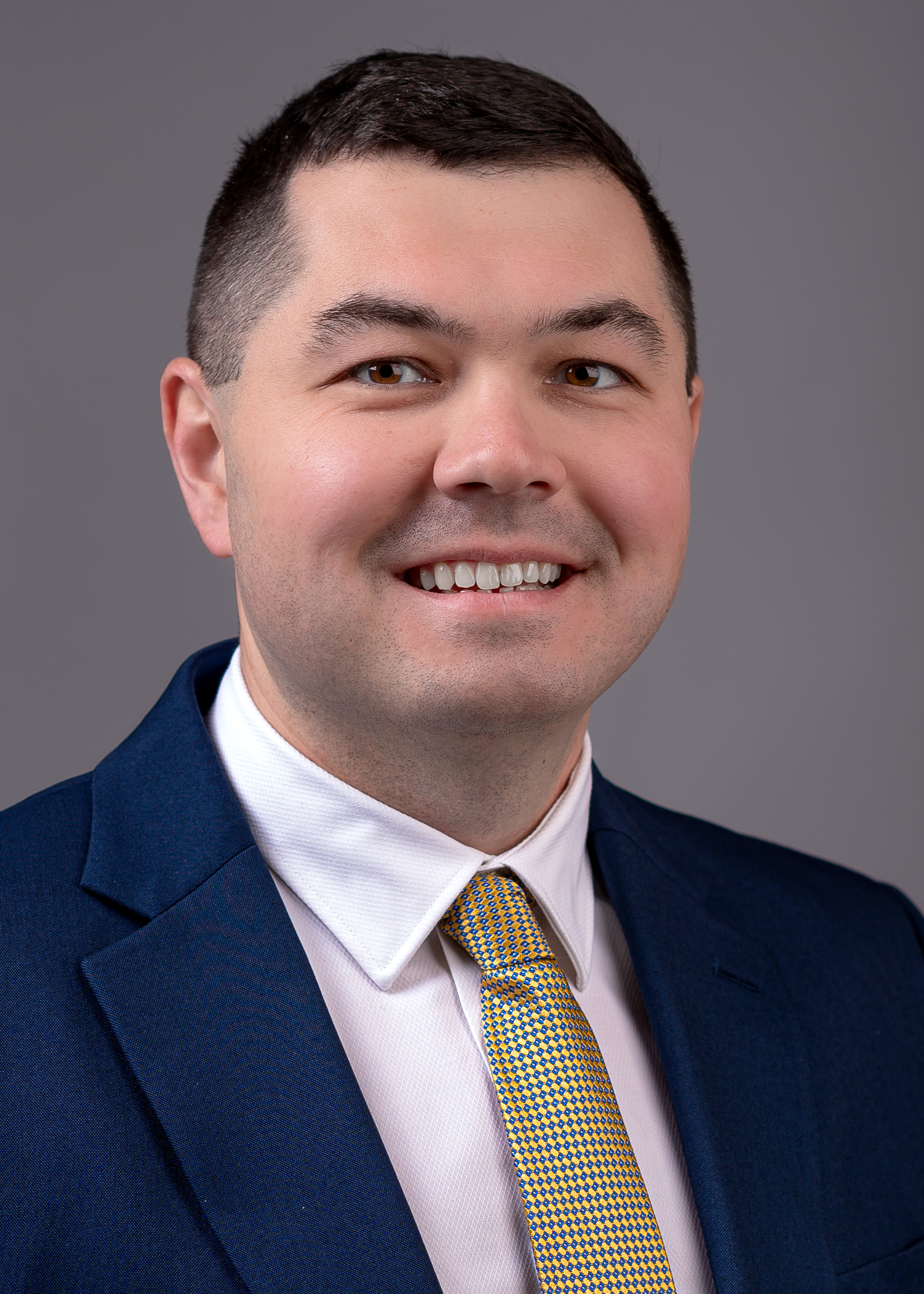

Member of the Kentucky House of Representatives from the 98th district
- Incumbent
- Assumed office January 1, 2025
- Preceded by: Danny Bentley

Personal details
- Born: May 31, 1991 (age 35)
- Party: Republican

Aaron Benjamin Thompson (born May 31, 1991) is an American politician who has served as a member of the Kentucky House of Representatives since January 2025. He represents the 98th district, which includes Greenup County and part of Boyd.

== Political career ==
Thompson was elected in the 2024 Kentucky House of Representatives election following the retirement of incumbent representative Danny Bentley. He received 71.9 percent of the vote, defeating Democratic candidate Tammie Womack.

== Electoral history ==
=== 2024 ===
2024 Kentucky House of Representatives 98th district election
Party	Candidate	Votes	%
Republican	Aaron Thompson	15,561	71.9
Democratic	Tammie Womack	6,087	28.1
Total votes		21,648	100.0
Republican hold			

Kentucky House of Representatives
Preceded by Danny Bentley	Member of the Kentucky House of Representatives from the 98th district 2025–present	Succeeded by incumbent
