= Lew Nicholls =

American politician

Member of the Kentucky House of Representatives from the 98th district
- In office March 15, 2016 – January 1, 2017
- Preceded by: Tanya Pullin
- Succeeded by: Danny Bentley

Personal details
- Party: Democratic

Lew Nicholls is an American politician from Kentucky who was a member of the Kentucky House of Representatives from March 2016 to January 2017. Nicholls was elected in a March 2016 special election following the resignation of Democratic incumbent Tanya Pullin after being appointed to a judgeship by governor Matt Bevin. He was defeated in November 2016 by Republican Danny Bentley in the November general election.
