= Trauma risk management =

Prevention method

Trauma risk management (TRiM) is a method of secondary PTSD (and other traumatic stress related mental health disorders) prevention. The TRiM process enables non-healthcare staff to monitor and manage colleagues. TRiM training provides practitioners with a background understanding of psychological trauma and its effects.

TRiM is a trauma-focused peer support system and the way it works is wholly compliant with the PTSD management guidelines produced by the National Institute for Health and Care and Excellence.

Trauma risk management Practitioners are trained to carry out an interview which identifies a number of risk factors which, when present, increase the likelihood that an individual may suffer poor longer term mental health as a result of a traumatic event. The initial TRiM interview takes place with an individual, 72 hours after a traumatic incident. People who score highly on this initial interview are provided with extra support by colleagues, and where appropriate, line managers. A follow-up TRiM interview is then carried out approximately one month later to assess how well people have come to terms with the traumatic event at that point. Individuals who are found to have persistent difficulties at this point are encouraged and assisted to seek a professional assessment in order to access any specific treatment they require.

TRiM originated within the UK military after previously used reactive single session models of post incident intervention, such as Critical Incident Stress Debriefing, were subject to scientific scrutiny and shown to not just lack effectiveness but also have the potential to do harm. Professor Neil Greenberg was one of the team at the forefront of developing peer-led traumatic stress support packages, now known as TRiM. He is an academic psychiatrist based at King's College London UK and is a consultant occupational and forensic psychiatrist.

Although it was first developed in the UK military, trauma risk management is now used by a range of public and commercial organisations. This includes charities, emergency services, security firms, risk management organisations, UK Government departments including the Foreign and Commonwealth Office, the oil and gas industry, transport organisations and media companies including the BBC.

== Evidence and research ==
A large number of research papers have been published about the use of TRiM and its effectiveness and acceptance. This includes research about the use of TRiM by Cumbria Constabulary, following the Cumbria shootings in 2010. This research showed that the officers and staff who received a TRiM response fared better than their colleagues who did not and were less likely to be absent from work than colleagues who did not receive a TRiM intervention.

Research has shown that the use of TRiM may assist in increasing the psychological resilience of military personnel through the facilitation of social support.

A review of TRiM research was published in the Journal of Occupational Medicine in April 2015 and since that time a further 2017 paper has shown that TRiM improves help-seeking after traumatic incidents.
