= Peer support =

Help between peers

Peer support occurs when people provide knowledge, experience, emotional, social or practical help to each other. It commonly refers to an initiative consisting of trained supporters (although it can be provided by peers without training), and can take a number of forms such as peer mentoring, reflective listening (reflecting content and/or feelings), or counseling. Peer support is also used to refer to initiatives where colleagues, members of self-help organizations and others meet, in person or online, as equals to give each other connection and support on a reciprocal basis.

Peer support is distinct from other forms of social support in that the source of support is a peer, a person who is similar in fundamental ways to the recipient of the support; their relationship is one of equality. A peer is in a position to offer support by virtue of relevant experience: he or she has "been there, done that" and can relate to others who are now in a similar situation. Trained peer support workers such as peer support specialists and peer counselors receive special training and are required to obtain Continuing Education Units, like clinical staff. Some other trained peer support workers may also be law-enforcement personnel and firefighters as well as emergency medical responders The social peer support also offers an online system of distributed expertise, interactivity, social distance and control, which may promote disclosure of personal problems (Paterson, Brewer, & Leeseberg, 2013).

== Underlying theory ==
Peer support has been shown to be effective in substance use and related behaviour, treatment engagement, and ameliorating risk behaviours associated with HIV and hepatitis C, and empowering people with mental illness and improving their quality of life. Its effectiveness is believed to derive from a variety of psychosocial processes first described by Mark Salzer and colleagues in 2002: social support, experiential knowledge, social learning theory, social comparison theory, the helper-therapy principle, and self-determination theory.

- Social support is the existence of positive psychosocial interactions with others with whom there is mutual trust and concern. Positive relationships contribute to positive adjustment and buffer against stressors and adversities by offering (a) emotional support (esteem, attachment, and reassurance), (b) instrumental support (material goods and services), (c) companionship and (d) information support (advice, guidance, and feedback).
- Experiential knowledge is specialized information and perspectives that people obtain from living through a particular experience such as substance abuse, a physical disability, chronic physical or mental illness, or a traumatic event such as combat, a natural disaster, domestic violence or a violent crime, sexual abuse, or imprisonment. Experiential knowledge tends to be unique and pragmatic and when shared contributes to solving problems and improving quality of life.
- Social learning theory postulates that peers, because they have undergone and survived relevant experiences, are more credible role models for others. Interactions with peers who are successfully coping with their experiences or illness are more likely to result in positive behavior change.
- Social comparison means that individuals are more comfortable interacting with others who share common characteristics with themselves, such as a psychiatric illness, in order to establish a sense of normalcy. By interacting with others who are perceived to be better than them, peers are given a sense of optimism and something to strive toward.
- The helper-therapy principle proposes that there are four significant benefits to those who provide peer support: (a) increased sense of interpersonal competence as a result of making an impact on another person's life; (b) development of a sense of equality in giving and taking between himself or herself and others; (c) helper gains new personally-relevant knowledge while helping; and (d) the helper receives social approval from the person they help, and others.
- Self-determination means that individuals have the right to determine their own future—people are more likely to act on their own decisions rather than decisions made by others for them.

== In schools and education ==
=== Peer mentoring ===
Peer mentoring takes place in learning environments such as schools, usually between an older more experienced student and a new student. Peer mentors appear mainly in secondary schools where students moving up from primary schools may need assistance in settling into the whole new schedule and lifestyle of secondary school life. Peer mentoring is also used in the workplace as a means of orienting new employees. New employees who are paired with a peer mentor are twice as likely to remain in their job than those who do not receive mentorship.

=== Peer listening ===
This form of peer support is widely used within schools. Peer supporters are trained, normally from within schools or universities, or sometimes by outside organizations, such as Childline's CHIPS (Childline In Partnership With Schools) program, to be "active listeners". Within schools, peer supporters are normally available at break or lunch times.

=== Peer mediation ===
Peer mediation is a means of handling incidents of bullying by bringing the victim and the bully together under mediation by one of their peers.

=== Peer helper in sports ===
A peer helper in sports works with young adults in sports such as football, soccer, track, volleyball, baseball, cheerleading, swimming, and basketball. They may provide help with game tactics (e.g. keeping your eye on the ball), emotional support, training support, and social support.

== In health ==
=== In mental health ===
Peer support can occur within, outside or around traditional mental health services and programs, between two people or in groups. Peer support is increasingly being offered through digital health like text messaging and smartphone apps. Peer support is a key concept in the recovery approach and in consumer-operated services programs. Consumers/clients of mental health programs have also formed non-profit self-help organizations, and serve to support each other and to challenge associated stigma and discrimination. The role of peer workers in mental health services was the subject of a conference in London in April 2012, jointly organized by the Centre for Mental Health and the NHS Confederation. Research has shown that peer-run self-help groups yield improvement in psychiatric symptoms resulting in decreased hospitalization, larger social support networks and enhanced self-esteem and social functioning. By matching users with individuals of similar lived experience, digital peer-supports platforms like Supportiv, co-founded by Pouria Mojabi, aim to increase emotional openness and reduce stigma. A review found that peer support could aid recovery, symptoms of depression, and self-belief. It found that service users valued peer support workers, and that peer support workers themselves had improved wellness and recovery. There is considerable variety in the ways that peer support is defined and conceptualized as it relates to mental health services. In some cases, clinicians, psychiatrists, and other staff who do not necessarily have their own experiences of receiving psychiatric treatment are being trained, often by psychiatric survivors, in peer support as an approach to building relationships that are genuine, mutual, and non-coercive.

==== For anxiety and depression ====
In Canada, the LEAF (Living Effectively with Anxiety and Fear) Program is a peer-led support group for cognitive-behavioral therapy of persons with mild to moderate panic disorders.

In a 2011 meta-analysis of seven randomized trials that compared a peer support intervention to group cognitive-behavioral therapy in patients with depression, peer support interventions were found to improve depression symptoms more than usual care alone and results may be comparable to those of group cognitive behavioral therapy. These findings suggest that peer support interventions have the potential to be effective components of depression care, and they support the inclusion of peer support in recovery-oriented mental health treatment.

Several studies have shown that peer support reduces fear during stressful situations such as combat and domestic violence and may mitigate post-traumatic stress disorder. The 1982 Vietnam-Era Veterans Adjustment Survey showed that PTSD was highest in those men and women who lacked positive social support from family, friends, and society in general.

==== For first responders ====
Peer support programs have also been implemented to address stress and psychological trauma among law-enforcement personnel and firefighters as well as emergency medical responders. Peer support is an important component of the critical incident stress management program used to alleviate stress and trauma among disaster first responders.

==== For survivors of trauma ====
Peer support has been used to help survivors of trauma, such as refugees, cope with stress and deal with difficult living conditions. Peer support is integral to the services provided by the National Center for Trauma-Informed Care. Other programs have been designed for female survivors of domestic violence and for women in prison.

Survivor Corps defines peer support for trauma survivors as "Encouragement and assistance provided by a colleague who has overcome similar difficulties to engender self-confidence and autonomy and to enable the survivor to make his or her own decisions and implement them." Peer support is a fundamental strategy in the rehabilitation of landmine survivors in Afghanistan, Bosnia, El Salvador and Vietnam. A study of 470 amputee survivors of war-related violence in six countries showed that nearly one hundred percent said they had benefited from peer support.

A peer support program operated by the Centre d'Encadrement et de Développement des Anciens Combattants in Burundi with support from the Center for International Stabilization and Recovery and Action on Armed Violence has assisted survivors of war-related violence, including women with disabilities, and female ex-combatants since 2010. A similar program in Rwanda works with survivors of the Rwandan genocide. Peer support has been recommended as a fundamental part of victim assistance programs for survivors of war-related violence.

A 1984 study on the impact of peer support and support groups for victims of domestic violence showed that 146 battered women found women's peer support groups the most helpful source of a range of available treatments. The women in these groups appeared to give direct advice and to act as role models. A 1986 study on 70 adolescent mothers considered to be at risk for domestic violence showed that peer support improved cognitive problem-solving skills, self-reinforcement, and parenting competence.

Pandora's Aquarium, an online support group operating as part of Pandora's Project, offers peer support to survivors of rape and sexual abuse and their friends and family.

=== For families of children with complex needs ===
Caregivers and family members of children who have complex medical needs are often under a great deal of pressure and balance meeting the child's physical and mental needs while also caring for other family members. Interventions to support these family members in the form of peer support aim to provide social support. Peer support may be given directly through peer-to-peer mentoring or in groups such a support group with a peer or facilitator leading the group. The effectiveness of peer-support programs has not been well studied. There is no evidence of harm and in general, parents and caregivers (carers) feel that the support programs they used were valuable. There is no strong evidence from trials of benefit and more research is needed to determine how effective this peer support is and what format is the most effective.

=== In addiction ===
Twelve-step programs for overcoming substance misuse and other addiction recovery groups are often based on peer support. Since the 1930s Alcoholics Anonymous has promoted peer support between new members and their sponsors: "The process of sponsorship is this: an alcoholic who has made some progress in the recovery program shares that experience on a continuous, individual basis with another alcoholic who is attempting to attain or maintain sobriety through AA." Other addiction recovery programs rely on peer support without following the twelve-step model.

=== In chronic illness ===
Peer support has been beneficial for many people living with diabetes. Diabetes encompasses all aspects of people's lives, often for decades. Support from peers can offer emotional, social, and practical assistance that helps people do the things they need to do to stay healthy. Peer support groups for diabetics complement and enhance other health care services. J.F. Caro is the co-founder and Chief Scientific Officer of one of such groups named Peer for Progress.

Peer support has also been provided for people with cancer and HIV. The Breast Cancer Network of Strength trains peer counselors to work with breast cancer survivors.

=== For people with disabilities ===
Peer support is considered to be a key component of the independent living movement and has been widely used by organizations that work with people with disabilities, including the Amputee Coalition of America (ACA) and Survivor Corps. Since 1998 the ACA has operated a National Peer Network for survivors of limb loss. The Blinded Veterans Association has recently launched Operation Peer Support (OPS), a program designed to support men and women returning to the US blinded or experiencing significant visual impairment in connection with their military service. Peer support has also benefited survivors of traumatic brain injury and their families. There is also FacingDisability for Families Facing Spinal Cord Injuries , which has a peer counseling program in addition to 1,000 videos drawn from interviews of people with spinal cord injuries, their families, caregivers and experts.

=== For veterans and their families ===
Several programs exist that provide peer support for military veterans in the US and Canada. In 2010 the Military Women to Women Peer Support Group was established in Helena, Montana.

The Tragedy Assistance Program for Survivors (TAPS) provides peer support, crisis care, casualty casework assistance, and grief and trauma resources for families of members of the US military. Operation Peer Support (OPS) is a program for US military veterans who were blinded or have significant visual impairment.

In January 2013 Senator Patty Murray, Chairman of the United States Senate Committee on Veterans' Affairs, sponsored an amendment of the National Defense Authorization Act (S.3254) that would require peer counseling as part of a comprehensive suicide prevention program for US veterans.

==== For veterans with PTSD ====
Peer support outreach for those exposed to traumatic events refers to programs that seek to identify and reach out to those with or at risk for mental health problems following a traumatic event as a means of connecting those people to mental health services. Paraprofessional peers are defined as having a shared background as the target population and work closely with and supplement the services of the mental healthcare team. These peers are trained in certain interventions (such as Psychological First Aid) and are closely supervised by professional mental healthcare personnel. Peer support for recovery from PTSD refers to programs in which someone with lived experience of PTSD, who experienced a significant reduction in symptoms, provides formal services to those who have not yet made significant steps in recovery from his or her condition. The peer support for recovery model focuses on improvement in overall health and wellness, and has long been successful in the treatment of SMI (serious mental illness) but is relatively new for PTSD.

A further review of existing literature found that carefully recruited, trained, supervised, and supported paraprofessionals can deliver mental health interventions effectively, and may be valuable in communities with fewer resources for mental healthcare.

Researchers at the Palo Alto VA National Center for PTSD also conducted focus groups at the VA Palo Alto Health Care System Trauma Recovery Programs, a PTSD Residential Rehabilitation Program, and a Women's Trauma Recovery Program to determine veteran and staff perceptions of informal peer support interventions already in place. Four themes were identified, including "peer support contributing to a feeling of social connectedness", "positive role modeling by the peer support provider", "peer support augmenting care offered by professional providers", and "peer supporter acting as a 'culture broker' and orienting recipients to mental health treatment."

These findings have been put into practice through a peer support program for veterans in the Sonora, Stockton, and Modesto VA outpatient clinics. The clinics are part of the Palo Alto Veterans Affairs Healthcare System that extend to more rural parts of northern California. The program is funded through grants in support of new treatment approaches to serve veterans in rural, traditionally underserved areas. Leadership for the program comes from the Menlo Park division of the Palo Alto VA system.

The peer support program has been operational since 2012 with over 268 unique veterans seen between 2012 and 2015. The two peer support providers involved in the program are veterans of the Vietnam and Iraq wars, respectively, and after having recovered from their own mental health disorders utilize their experiences to help their fellow veterans. The two providers have been responsible for leading between 5 and 7 groups each week as well as conducting telephone outreach and one-on-one engagement visits. These services have successfully helped to augment the often overburdened mental health treatment teams at the central valley outpatient VA clinics.

The peer support program has been described in several publications. A personal story of success was featured in Stanford Medicine magazine and the collaborative nature of the program was described in the book, Partnerships for Mental Health.

=== For people at work ===
Trauma risk management (TRiM) is a work-place based peer support for use in helping to protect the mental health of employees who have been exposed to traumatic stress. The TRiM process enables non-healthcare staff to monitor and manage colleagues. TRiM peer support training provides TRiM Practitioners with a background understanding of psychological trauma and its effects. TRiM was developed in the UK by military mental health professionals including Professor Neil Greenberg. There have been numerous scientific publications on the use of TRiM which have demonstrated it to be an acceptable and effective method of peer support. Similar to TRiM, the sustaining resilience at work (StRaW) peer support could increase recognition among coworkers and managers about the significance of supporting fellow workers in applying their recently acquired knowledge and abilities on the job. StRaW was developed by March on Stress Ltd and early research again shows it to be a credible and effective way of supporting staff at work.

=== Sex workers ===
Several peer-based organizations exist for sex workers. The aim of these organizations is to support the health, rights, and well-being of sex workers and advocate on their behalf for law reform in order to make work safer. Sex work is work and there are many people who willingly choose it as a job/career. While sex trafficking does exist, not everyone who does sex work is doing so under duress. Social stigma is a major hurdle sex workers encounter, with many people trying to 'save' them. Peer support workers and peer educators are seen as best practices by the Sex Industry Network (SIN) when engaging with community members because peers can understand that someone could willingly choose to do sex work.
