= Hoby Anderson =

American politician

Member of the Kentucky House of Representatives from the 98th district
- In office January 1, 1997 – January 1, 2001
- Preceded by: Ron Cyrus
- Succeeded by: Tanya Pullin

Personal details
- Party: Republican

Hobart Anderson (born 1952) is an American politician from Kentucky who was a member of the Kentucky House of Representatives from 1997 to 2001. Anderson was first elected in 1996 after incumbent representative Ron Cyrus did not seek reelection. He was defeated for reelection in 2000 by Democrat Tanya Pullin.
