= Ron Cyrus =

American politician (1935–2006)

Member of the Kentucky House of Representatives from the 98th district
- In office January 1, 1976 – January 1, 1997
- Preceded by: Terry McBrayer
- Succeeded by: Hoby Anderson

Personal details
- Born: Ronald Ray Cyrus; July 10, 1935 Flatwoods, Kentucky, U.S.
- Died: February 28, 2006 (aged 70) Lexington, Kentucky, U.S.
- Party: Democratic
- Spouses: Ruth Ann Casto (m. 1952; div. 1966); Joan Marie Douthat (m. 1970)
- Children: 4, including Billy Ray Cyrus
- Relatives: Miley Cyrus (granddaughter); Noah Cyrus (granddaughter)
- Occupation: Steelworker, politician

Military service
- Allegiance: United States
- Branch/service: United States Air Force

Ronald Ray Cyrus (July 10, 1935 – February 28, 2006) was an American politician and public servant in Greenup County, Kentucky. A member of the Democratic Party, he was elected to the Kentucky House of Representatives for 10 consecutive terms, from 1975 until he retired in 1996.

== Early life ==
Cyrus was born in Flatwoods, Kentucky, to Verlina Adeline (née Hay; 1894–1980) and Eldon Lindsey Cyrus (1895–1975). He was a 1959 graduate of Russell High School, a graduate of Ashland Community and Technical College, and attended the University of Kentucky.

== Politics ==
A member of the Democratic Party, he was elected a member of the Kentucky House of Representatives for Kentucky's 98th Legislative District, which encompasses Greenup County, in 1975, and began his career in the General Assembly in 1976. He was elected to 10 consecutive terms—serving a total of 21 years—until he retired from office in 1996.

Cyrus served as executive secretary and treasurer of the Kentucky AFL-CIO from 1984 to 1986 and was employed as a rigger with Armco Steel Ashland Works. He was a Kentucky Colonel, served as a regional representative with Alan Greenspan of the Federal Reserve Board, member of The Crownsmen Quartet, Little League baseball coach, and a member of Kentucky Mountain Saddle Horse Association.

Cyrus also served in the United States Air Force in Japan. He served as founding chairman of the Board of the Billy Ray Cyrus Charities Foundation and was a devoted member of Big Woods Community Church in Wellington, Kentucky.

== Death and tributes ==
Cyrus was 70 years old when he died on February 28, 2006, of lung cancer at a Lexington hospital. He was buried in Louisa, Kentucky, with his funeral on March 5, at Big Woods Community Church in Wellington, Kentucky. A visitation was held on March 4 at the student union at his alma mater, Russell High School. As a tribute in his honor, the Kentucky House of Representatives observed a moment of silence on March 1, 2006.

The song "I Miss You" by Cyrus's granddaughter Miley Cyrus was written for him and was featured on her 2007 album Hannah Montana 2: Meet Miley Cyrus. The song "Hey Daddy" by Cyrus's son Billy Ray Cyrus is also dedicated to him, on the album Wanna Be Your Joe. Billy Ray sang this song to Cyrus, the night before his death. In honor of Cyrus, his granddaughter, Miley chose to act as "Ronnie" for her character in the 2010 film The Last Song. She also changed her middle name from "Hope" to "Ray" in Cyrus's honor. A chapter of her autobiography Miles to Go is also dedicated to Cyrus.
