= Australian Coal Association =

Australian lobby group

The Australian Coal Association (ACA) is the major Australian coal mining industry lobby group. It represents the black coal producers of New South Wales and Queensland and consists of a number of relatively small coal mining companies or subsidiaries of larger corporations in those two states. Australia is the world's largest coal exporter, and black coal is Australia's second largest commodity export, worth more than A$24 billion in the financial year ending June 2008, and $46 billion, or nearly double this amount, for the corresponding calendar year ending December. Black coal provides around 57 per cent of Australia's grid-connected electricity (brown coal around 24%) and is vital for major industries such as steel making and cement manufacture.

On 23 August 2013, the Australian Coal Association released a statement that it will be subsumed into the Minerals Council of Australia.

== ACA and the environment ==
The Australian Coal Association acknowledges that 34 per cent of Australia's greenhouse gas emissions come from burning black and brown coal, primarily for the generation of electricity, but also for steel-making and cement manufacture. In 2003, the coal industry established the COAL21 initiative, bringing together the coal and electric power industries, unions, federal and state governments, and research organisations. Supported through a voluntary company levy, the $1 billion+ commitment will support research, development and demonstration of low-emissions coal technologies. Australia is at the forefront of the development of these technologies. To date, the COAL21 Fund has made commitments of more than $500 million to a number of active and in-development carbon capture and storage research projects. However, critics of the ACA have argued that "no other economy is as dependent on coal exports as ours, so why would anyone else feel the same imperative to lead?"
