= Center for Insurance Studies and Research =

Center at National Law University, Jodhpur, India

Coordinates: 26.3637528°N 73.0560901°E

The Center for Insurance Studies and Research (CISR) started in 2001 and is an education and training center at the National Law University, Jodhpur, India. It offers Postgraduate and Research programs.

The National Law University of Jodhpur was established in 2001. Other specialized and comprehensive centers of learning that the National Law University, Jodhpur includes are: the Center for Law and Management, Center for Insurance, and Center for Banking and Finance.

== Initial endowment ==
The first endowment for creating a chair on insurance studies was initiated by New India Assurance in December 2001 in the presence of the Finance Minister Yashwant Sinha and L M Singhvi, former member, Rajya Sabha.

== Insurance chair ==
The center has received an endowment of Rs. 4mm lakhs from New India Assurance Company Ltd. followed by Rs. 3.5mm by General Insurance Corporation of India to establish chairs on Insurance and Reinsurance. The establishment of the chair has encouraged the analysis and comparison of the contemporary trends in the assurance sector.

== History ==
The liberalization of the Indian economy and the subsequent passing of the IRDA Bill in 1999, expanded the investment opportunities in the insurance industry, bringing in a large number of players. This massive competition has resulted in the insurance sector achieving the highest rate of growth since pre liberalization. The next decade is expected to witness a phenomenal growth in the career opportunities for the insurance professionals.

The course content has been designed with the needs and requirement of the insurance sector in mind, and includes subjects ranging from Actuarial sciences to the concepts of reinsurance and management. The general insurance sector has opportunities for engineers, as their profile caters to the needs of the industry especially in the field of risk inspection and risk management.

The IRDA (Insurance Regulatory and Development Authority of India has certified the MBA Insurance as one of the qualifications required for Qualifications of Corporate Insurance Executives and Faculty of Agents’ Training Institutes.

Additionally, the Insurance Institute of India has allowed exemption to the MBA Insurance Degree holders from CISR, to directly appear for the Fellowship Examinations of Insurance Institute of India, exempting it from the Licentiate and Associate programs.
