= Neil Greenberg =

British academic psychiatrist

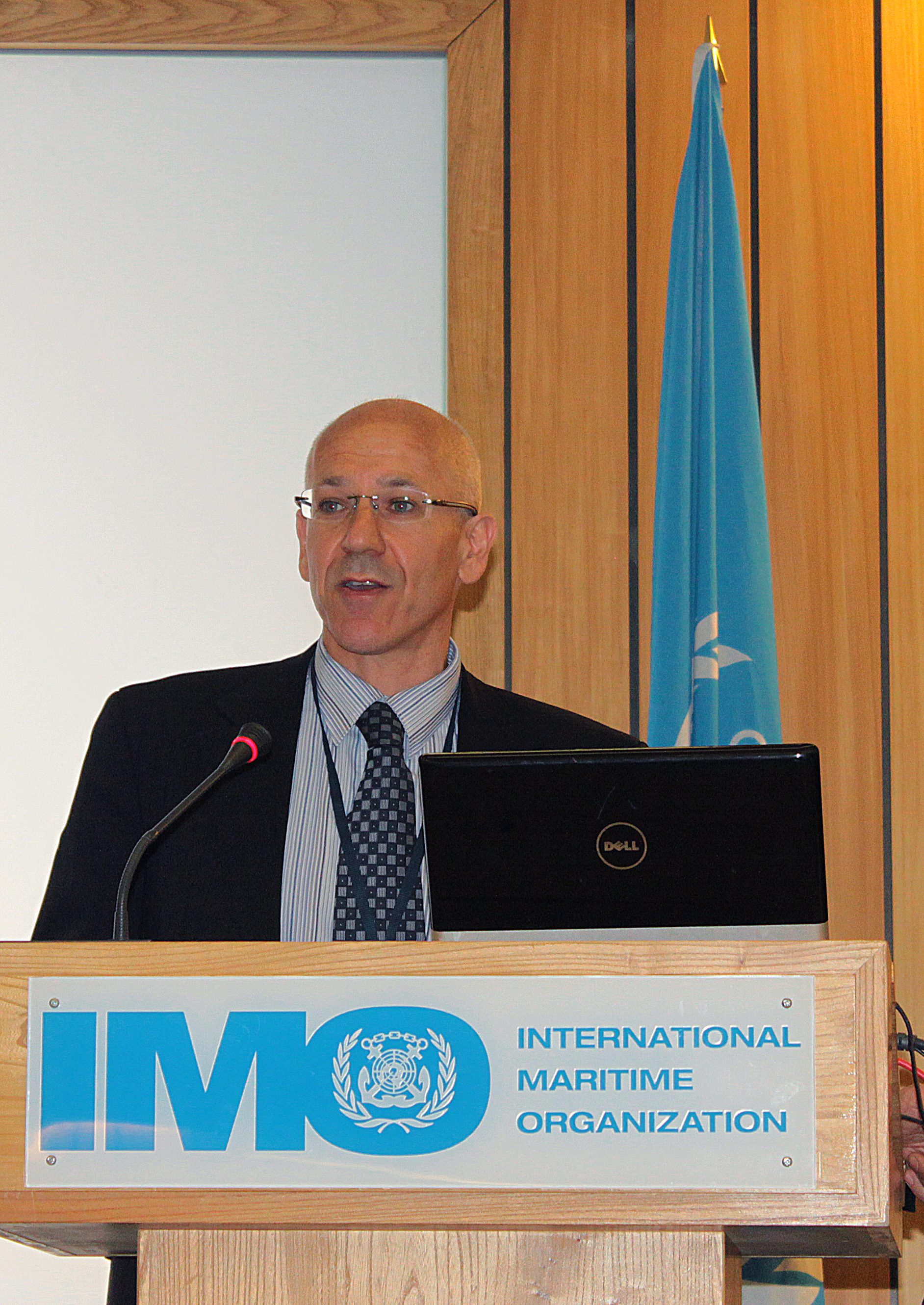
Professor Neil Greenberg, 2013

Neil Greenberg is an academic psychiatrist, who is a specialist in the understanding and management of psychological trauma, occupational mental ill-health and post traumatic stress disorder. Greenberg works with King's College London and served as the President of the UK Psychological Trauma Society from 2014 to 2017 and he led the 2023 World Psychiatric Association's position statement on mental health at work. He also runs the psychological health consultancy March on Stress. He is also the immediate past Chair of the Royal College of Psychiatrists Special Interest Group in Occupational Psychiatry. During the 2020 COVID pandemic, Greenberg was part of the NHS England and Improvement Wellbeing Team and contributed to the national response to protect the mental health of NHS workers.

Greenberg served in the UK Armed Forces for 23 years and during his service was part of the team to develop peer led traumatic stress support packages, most notably trauma risk management (TRiM), for which he was awarded the Gilbert Blane Medal. In 2023 he was awarded a prestigious honorary Fellowship of the Royal College of Physicians of Ireland.

Greenberg is a specialist in the field of trauma and mental health, and has published more than 400 scientific papers and book chapters.

Some of his recent academic work includes writing extensively about protecting the mental health of NHS staff and continuing to write about the mental health of employees more generally. He has also published extensively of the use of trauma risk management including being the senior author of a paper published in the Journal of Occupational Medicine in May 2015.

He has also led a comprehensive review paper published in the British Medical Bulletin on PTSD and led a paper published in the Journal of Mental Health in 2015 which examined the potential mental health consequences for Ebola workers in West Africa. More recent publications include ones on moral injury in prison staff and the psychosocial impacts of disaster compensation processes.

He regularly provides commentary in the media on the subjects of mental health, trauma and post traumatic stress disorder.

He is also a lead advisor to UK charity Hostage UK and is a trustee with the Society of Occupational Medicine and the Faculty of Occupational Medicine

Greenberg was the Royal College of Psychiatrists Lead for Trauma and the Military and was shortlisted for the Royal College of Psychiatrists, psychiatrist of the year 2015. The mental health team he led, which provided mental health support for the London Nightingale Hospital in 2020 during the Covid pandemic, won the Royal College of Psychiatrists Team of the Year (adult psychiatry) in 2021.
