= NAGAP =

NAGAP, the Association for Graduate enrollment management (formerly The National Association of Graduate Admissions Professionals) is a non-profit professional organization whose members are devoted exclusively to the concerns of individuals working in the graduate enrollment management environment.

Membership in NAGAP provides an opportunity to network with professional colleagues at all sizes and types of institutions: large and small, public and private, secular and non-secular.

The annual conference, development institutes, membership directory, email newsletter, Perspectives journal, mentor program, and chapter affiliations all help facilitate communication among members.

== History ==
25 Significant Events in the Life of NAGAP -April 15, 1987—After a recruiting workshop held at Babson College, a group of graduate admissions personnel suggested the creation of a forum for networking with colleagues about their mutual concerns in the growing graduate admissions field. Also, the admissions professionals had a desire to create a unified schedule of graduate fairs for the Northeastern region.

-Summer-Fall 1987—The group held a second meeting and NEAGAP (New England Association of Graduate Admissions Professionals) was born. Donald Shaw from Springfield College in Massachusetts was chosen the first president of the new organization. The first membership mailing garnered 32 members from New England and 15 members from outside the region. The treasury rapidly grew to $1,159.16, based mostly on the $35 membership fee. With the assistance of Peterson's Guides, Inc., the fledgling association also published and mailed its first newsletter, which became a journal three years later.

-April 1988—The first NEAGAP conference was held at Sturbridge, Massachusetts, with approximately 100 conference participants in attendance.

-April 26, 1991—By the fourth conference, which took place in Manchester, Vermont, the membership had grown to over 300, with more members outside the New England area than within it. Members at this conference voted to become a national organization called NAGAP—National Association of Graduate Admissions Professionals.

-September 1993—The NAGAP Standards for Graduate Admissions Personnel first appeared in the NAGAP Journal; they were voted by acclamation at the 1994 conference and still guide the organization's professional practices today.

-June 1993—The first annual Calendar of Graduate and Professional School Fairs was distributed in paper form to all NAGAP members.

-Summer 1994—NAGAP developed and administered its first biannual salary and membership survey.

-Summer 1995—First Professional Development Workshop for new admissions personnel was held with approximately 40 new admissions professionals in attendance.

-Winter 1996—NAGAP introduced a Listserv and a Web site for member use.

-April 1996—The 10th anniversary was celebrated at the conference in Orlando. Over 270 members attended this conference and NAGAP had a total membership of approximately 750.

-February 1998—NAGAP hosted its first Advanced Professional Development Workshop in San Juan, Puerto Rico.

-June 2000—NAGAP met its goal of 1,000 members.

-Summer 2000—The NAGAP Calendar of Graduate and Professional Fairs became a web-based directory.

-November 2001—NAGAP presented the first Executive Professional Development Workshop in New Orleans.

-Fall 2002—the NAGAP Journal changed to a newsmagazine called Perspectives.

-January 2003—NAGAP's first electronic newsletter was distributed to the membership. The first Department of State-sponsored EducationUSA adviser attended a NAGAP conference, marking the beginning of a strong, mutually beneficial relationship between the overseas advisers and NAGAP.

-April 2005—The Executive Professional Development Workshop was reorganized into a NAGAP's first one-day, topic-oriented, pre-conference session. The name was also changed to Pre-Conference Executive Institute for Graduate Admissions Professionals.

-April 2006—NAGAP's 19th conference was held in Las Vegas, Nevada, with over 900 members in attendance. By this conference, the NAGAP treasury had grown to over $1 million and membership had passed the 1,500 mark.

-June 2006—To better serve its large membership, NAGAP hired an association management company and opened its first executive office in Lenexa, Kansas.

-April 2007—The 20th Anniversary Conference for NAGAP is held in Orlando, Florida —20 years and still growing!

-July 2008— NAGAP's first International Relations Committee and Education Committee was formed. The first Education Leadership meeting was held November 2011, signifying the commitment of NAGAP to effectively design and deliver instructional presentations that meet member needs and address the changes taking place in the organization and universities in the U.S. and abroad.

-2008—NAGAP's Membership hit 2,013 and by 2011, membership representation is in all 50 states and 9 countries.

-July 2010— NAGAP adopted the concept of Knowledge Based Governance.

-2010— Hobson's became NAGAP's first Alliance Circle Partner, followed by ETS in 2011.

NAGAP has 11 functioning Chapters currently operating in 2011, first Chapter NJ-GAP 1994.

-April 2012—NAGAP celebrates 25 years as Leaders in Graduate Enrollment Management!
