= African Cashew Alliance =

Multinational organization

- Abbreviation: ACA
- Formation: 2006; 20 years ago
- Purpose: Growing Africa's cashew industry
- Headquarters: Accra, Ghana
- Past President: Otunba Tola Faseru
- President: Ibrahim Sanfo
- Managing Director: Ernest Mintah, Esq
- Website: http://www.africancashewalliance.com/en

The African Cashew Alliance (ACA) is an international organization established in 2006 and dedicated to promoting the growth of the cashew industry in Africa. The ACA provides African cashew farmers with technical assistance and best practices, facilitates foreign investment, and promotes the development of processing cashews within Africa.

== Activities ==
As of August 2015, the ACA consists of nearly 200 companies involved with the African cashew industry with the majority being from Africa, notably the Ivory Coast, Benin, Ghana, the Gambia, Burkina Faso, Nigeria, Tanzania, Kenya and Mozambique.

The organization runs the ACA Annual Cashew Conference and Expo every year in a different country to bolster communication amongst producers and support local cashew industries across Africa.

The ACA introduced the ACA Quality and Sustainability Seal in 2012 to enable certified cashew processors to prove that their products comply by international food safety laws. The seal enables processors without the funds necessary for expensive food safety certifications to sell their products internationally. The ACA certification seal complies with the US Food Safety Modernization Act and is recognized by major purchasing organizations, such as Kraft Foods, Intersnack, and Red River Foods.

== Background ==
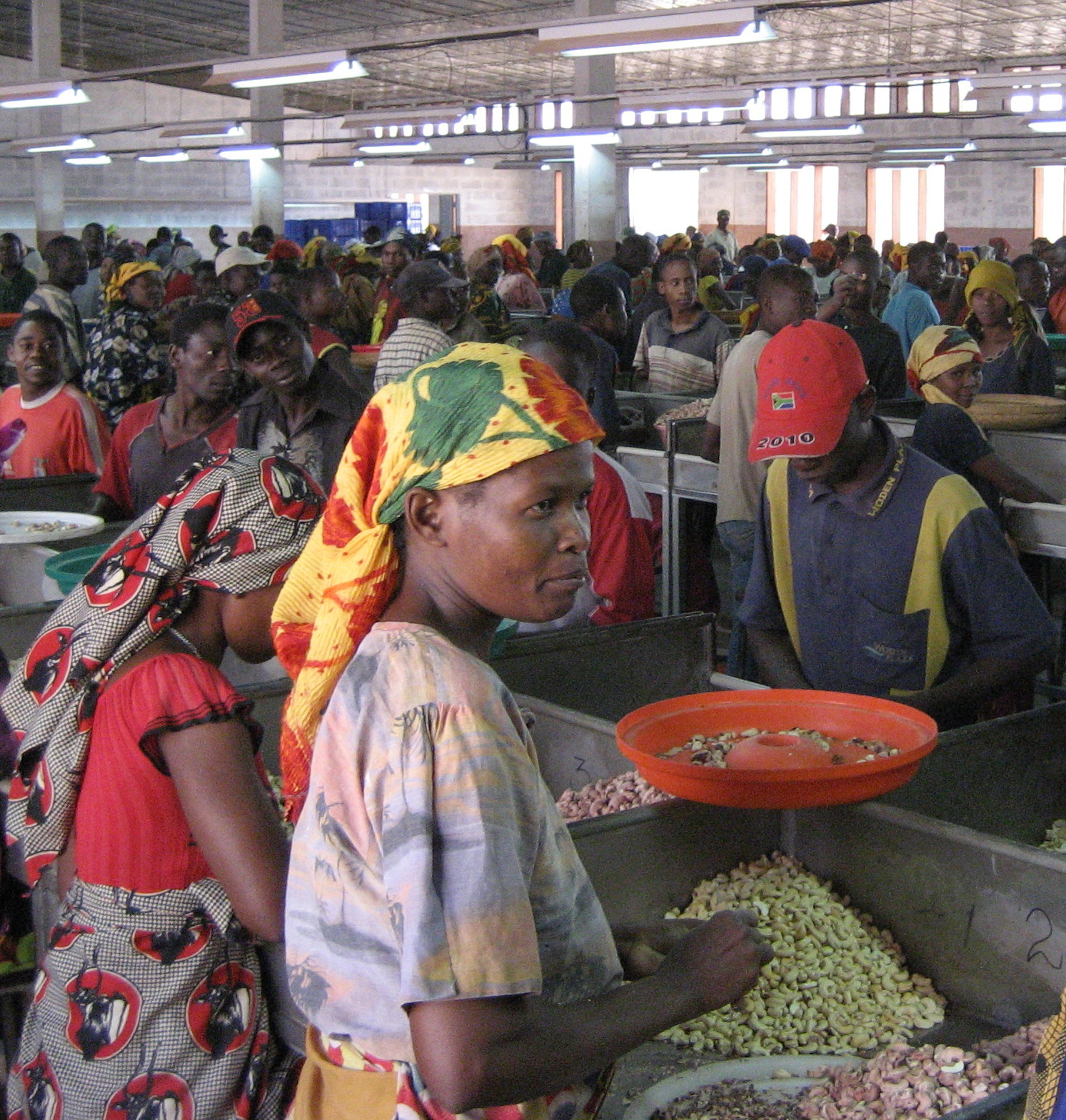
Cashew processing plant in Mozambique.

Growing demand for cashew nuts in Western Europe have led to increased production of cashews worldwide. As of 2022, cashews are primarily grown and harvested in Sub-Saharan Africa and Asia. Africa produces 58% of the annual yield, with 44% of the production being concentrated in West Africa. In 2019, the Ivory Coast was the world's third largest producers of cashews (0.731 million tonnes) behind Vietnam (2.6 million tonnes) and India (0.786 million tonnes). From 2000 to 2019, 98% of African cashews were exported as raw nuts still within their shell instead of removed and ready for consumption. These raw nuts are exported for processing in Vietnam and India where they can be de-shelled and sold for greater profit. In 2018, extracted cashew nuts from India sold for three times higher than what cashew farmers in the Ivory Coast were paid for raw cashews. An estimated 25% increase in Africa's cashew processing capabilities was projected to generate an additional $100 million in household income for cashew producers. Cashew growers across Africa have responded by increasing their processing capabilities.

The ACA promotes processing raw cashew nuts in Africa rather than exporting them to Vietnam and India.
