= Austrian Cockpit Association =

Professional pilot organization

The Austrian Cockpit Association (ACA) is a professional pilot organization. ACA is the national member of IFALPA and ECA representing Austrian professional pilots. Main objective is the continuous improvement of aviation safety and security.

== Description ==
Membership is open to pilots flying for commercial operators in Austria and Austrian nationality pilots flying professionally in countries with no IFALPA recognized pilot association. Student pilots, retired pilots and persons with special interest in aviation can become 'associated members' (limited rights). However, each new membership has to be confirmed by the board. Full members enjoy special support and benefits.

Delegates of ACA are represented in all important working groups of IFALPA and ECA. On national level, ACA is partner of governmental aviation regulatory authorities.

ACA working groups:

- AAP (Accident Analysis and Prevention)
- BIZ (Business Aviation)
- HUPER (Human Performance / Aviation Psychology, Aviation Medicine, Training and Licensing)
- SOCIAL WINGS (social aspects of aviation)
- P&G (Professional and Government Affairs)
- ATS (Air Traffic Services)
- DG (Dangerous Goods)
- SEC (Security)
- AGE (Aerodrome and Ground Aids)
- ADO (Aircraft Design and Operation)
- HEL (Helicopter)

Except office staff, all ACA delegates and board members work voluntary in the association.

ACA informs the member pilots short notice by homepage, social media and e-mail. The organization of aviation related presentations and workshops is also a task of ACA. Background information on aviation is provided by the bi-monthly published magazine 'ACA Info'.

ACA cooperates with other professional aviation associations in Austria, e.g. AATCA (Austrian Air Traffic Controllers Association) and VOEF (Association of professional Airline Dispatchers).

In its 2016, general assembly, ACA elected Embraer 195 First Officer Isabel Doppelreiter as president, making it the first pilot association worldwide to elect a female president.

== See also ==
- Aircraft pilot
- Pilot in command
