= Centre for Independent Social Research =

Russian research institute

- Type: Non-governmental organisation
- Industry: Academic research
- Founded: 1991
- Founder: Victor Voronkov
- Headquarters: St. Petersburg, Russia
- Products: Knowledge
- Number of employees: 22
- Website: www.cisr.ru

Centre for Independent Social Research (CISR) is a nongovernmental research institute in Russia working in four main areas: Social research projects; professional development of young sociologists; the formation of professional networks in the social sciences; Sociological expertise and consultations. The CISR activities are financed mainly through Russian and international scientific funds and philanthropic organizations. Since 2001, the John D. and Catherine T. MacArthur Foundation has been a partner of CISR.

== History ==
The thought of establishing an independent sociological center first arose in the late 1980s and was the idea of Viktor Voronkov and Oleg Vite, who, at the time, were employees of the Leningrad division of the Academy of Sciences’ Institute of Sociology. Inspired by the rapid social and political changes taking place in the country, they gathered a group of enthusiasts and started conducting their own independent research projects. Edward Fomin, Elena Zdravomyslova, and Ingrid Oswald actively participated in the practical fulfillment of this idea. They all shared a desire to create a flexible, democratic research structure that would be capable of responding to the demands of a quickly changing Russian society and of promoting the integration of Russian sociologists into the international sociological community. The Center actually began working a few years before it was legally registered in 1991.

In 1994, the Center acquired a converted apartment office on Vasileostrovsky Island. CISR conducted various research projects, and became a visible actor in the Russian and international sociological communities. In 2000, CISR was able to acquire new office space on Ligovsky Prospect thanks to a grant from the Ford Foundation. The next year (2001), CISR received its first institutional grant from the John D. and Catherine T. MacArthur Foundation.

In June 2015 Russia's Ministry of Justice added the Centre to the so-called list of "foreign agent".

== Contribution to the Scientific Discussion ==
Employees of the Center worked to ensure that the constructivist approach (marginal for Russia in the 1990s) and qualitative methods were included in Russian researchers’ arsenal. This was made possible by several factors: holding international methodological conferences such as “The Biographical Method of Studying Post-Socialistic Societies (1996),” carrying out educational projects focused on the popularization of qualitative methods for research among young sociologists, and publishing books detailing the results of empirical studies, including “The Construction of Ethnicity: Ethnic Communities in St. Petersburg (1998).” Continuing the tradition of researching relevant social processes, developing new approaches to social research, and integrating into the international community, CISR has organized several conferences: The Social Sciences, Racial Discourse, and Discriminatory Practices (2004); The Biographical Method in the Study of Post-Socialist Societies: 10 Years Later (2006); The Russian Field: A look from Abroad (2009).

In 2004, CISR initiated the creation of the Convention of Independent Sociological Centers of Russia (CISC) which united around 20 research organizations. Under the direction of the Convention, the first two books of the series Qualitative Methods in Social Research were published: I. Shteinberg, T. Shanin, E. Kovalev, A. Levinson Qualitative Methods. Sociological Field Studies and a collection of articles Leave in Order to Stay: the Sociologist in the Field.

Since 1998, CISR has been partners with the Heinrich Boell Foundation (Moscow/Berlin) working to create a scholarship program for talented young researchers. In 2000, the German-Russian Forum and the Robert Bosch Foundation awarded CISR a commemorative medal for their “contribution to the training of young researchers.

== Organisational structure ==
CISR employs 22 individuals: 12 hold Ph.Ds., several others are working on their dissertations. Professional areas of research include:

- Migration, ethnicity, and nationalism
- Borders and border communities
- Gender studies
- Ecological sociology
- Social studies of the economy
- Law and Society
- Urban studies
