= American College of Apothecaries =

Professional pharmacy association in the United States

- Abbreviation: ACA
- Formation: May 9, 1940
- Founded at: Richmond, Virginia
- Type: Professional Association
- Purpose: Pharmacy practice, continuing education, pharmaceutical compounding, professional development
- Headquarters: Bartlett, Tennessee
- Location: 2830 Summer Oaks Drive
- Region served: United States
- Website: acainfo.org/aca

The American College of Apothecaries (ACA) is a professional pharmacy organization based in the United States. The organization supports pharmacists and other pharmacy professionals through continuing education, professional development, and programs related to pharmacy practice. ACA is accredited by the Accreditation Council for Pharmacy Education (ACPE) as a provider of continuing pharmacy education. "About ACA". American College of Apothecaries.

ACA is affiliated with the American College of Veterinary Pharmacists (ACVP) and the ACA Research and Education Foundation (REF).

== History ==
The American College of Apothecaries was founded on May 9, 1940, during a meeting of the American Pharmaceutical Association, now the American Pharmacists Association, in Richmond, Virginia. Its establishment occurred during a period of transition in American pharmacy, as pharmaceutical manufacturing and mass production of medicines were becoming increasingly prominent.

The organization's early history was documented by pharmacy historian Ernst W. Stieb in History of the American College of Apothecaries, 1940–1965, published in 1970 by the American College of Apothecaries in collaboration with the American Institute of the History of Pharmacy. The work chronicled the organization's first 25 years and was subsequently reviewed in the peer-reviewed journal Medical History.

In 1977, ACA became a charter member of the Joint Commission of Pharmacy Practitioners (JCPP), a forum for national pharmacy organizations to address issues of common interest to the profession. ACA subsequently served as the secretariat for the commission for more than 30 years. ACA continues to participate as a member of JCPP."About the Joint Commission of Pharmacy Practitioners (JCPP)". American College of Clinical Pharmacy.

The ACA Research and Education Foundation was established in 1978 to support pharmacy-related research, public service, education, scholarships, and professional development initiatives.

In 1998, ACA helped establish the American College of Veterinary Pharmacists (ACVP) to support pharmacy professionals involved in veterinary pharmacotherapy and pharmacy services for animal patients.

ACA later established its headquarters and National Training Laboratory in Bartlett, Tennessee, which serves as a site for pharmacy education and pharmaceutical compounding training.

During debates over generic drug substitution in the early 1970s, the American College of Apothecaries opposed allowing pharmacists to substitute a different drug product for one specifically prescribed by a physician. ACA was among several pharmacy and medical organizations that opposed substitution, while the American Pharmaceutical Association supported repeal of state laws prohibiting pharmacist substitution.

== Programs and activities ==
=== Compounding education and training ===
The American College of Apothecaries provides pharmaceutical compounding education and training for pharmacists, pharmacy technicians, student pharmacists, and other pharmacy professionals. Its training programs include instruction in nonsterile and sterile compounding, veterinary compounding, dermatological compounding, pharmacy law, hazardous drug handling, and regulatory compliance.

ACA conducts live compounding courses at its National Training Laboratory in Bartlett, Tennessee, where programs combine classroom instruction with hands-on laboratory training. Programs include Fundamental Compounding with Pharmacy Law, Comprehensive Sterile Compounding, Veterinary Compounding Essentials, and Dermatological Compounding."Compounding Training Courses". American College of Apothecaries.

The organization also provides customized on-site compounding training for pharmacies and other organizations. These programs may use existing ACA curricula or be developed to address the training needs of an individual organization.

In addition to live training, ACA offers self-paced home study programs covering subjects including nonsterile compounding, hazardous drug handling, veterinary compounding, and dermatological compounding.

=== Continuing education ===
The American College of Apothecaries is accredited by the Accreditation Council for Pharmacy Education (ACPE) as a provider of continuing pharmacy education. ACPE records list ACA as an accredited continuing pharmacy education provider and document its accreditation history."American College of Apothecaries, Inc". Accreditation Council for Pharmacy Education.

ACA provides continuing education through live webinars, on-demand webinars, home study activities, certificate programs, conferences, and other educational programs. Its Online Education CEnter provides online continuing education and professional development activities for pharmacists, pharmacy technicians, student pharmacists, and other participants."American College of Apothecaries Online Education CEnter". American College of Apothecaries.

Among its jointly provided educational programs is the MichRx HIV Pharmacy Online Certification Training Program, an online program developed by MichRx Pharmacist Consulting Services and co-sponsored by ACA. The program provides continuing education related to HIV care and pharmacy practice."Certificate & Home Study Programs". American College of Apothecaries.
