= Pandora's Project =

US nonprofit organization

Pandora's Project is 501(c)(3) nonprofit organization that provides support to survivors of sexual assault. It provides a lending library, support forum, healing retreats, and other resources to survivors and their supporters and is entirely volunteer run. The support forum, Pandora's Aquarium, has over 80,000 registered members. Shannon Lambert, Pandora's Project founder, has been recognized for her work on the project as a 2009 L'Oreal Women of Worth honoree, earning a $25,000 grant for the nonprofit. She was also recognized as a Daily Point of Light Award recipient through the Points of Light Institute and featured alongside Tori Amos on the American news magazine show 20/20.
