= Academic Cooperation Association =

European think tank for cooperation in higher education

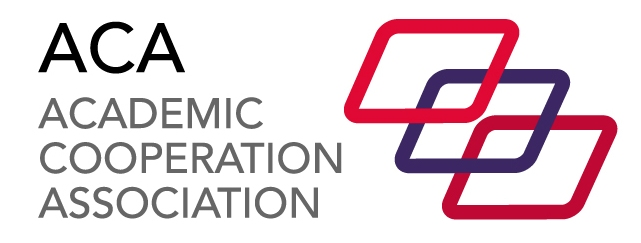
- Formation: 1993
- Headquarters: Brussels, Belgium
- Members: 16 full, 3 associate
- President: Ulrich Grothus
- Director: Irina Ferencz
- Website: aca-secretariat.be

The Academic Cooperation Association (ACA) is an international think tank in the area of international cooperation in higher education. Since 1993, ACA has worked to promote innovation and internationalisation of European higher education in collaboration with its pan-European network of member organisations, each responsible in their respective countries for supporting internationalisation in education and training. ACA also maintains a global perspective through its associate members in other parts of the world.

ACA’s activities include research and analysis, evaluations, consultancy for private and public bodies, advocacy and publications. The Academic Cooperation Association’s Secretariat is located in Brussels, Belgium, in order to create and maintain close working relations with the European institutions.

== Administrative Council ==
Name	Organisation	AC Role
Ulrich Grothus	ACA	President
Alenka Flander	CMEPIUS	Vice-President
Katarzyna Aleksy	NAWA	Treasurer
Stephan Geifes	DAAD	Administrator
Runa Vigdís Guðmarsdóttir	Rannís	Administrator
Olivier Tschopp	Movetia	Administrator
Gerhard Volz	OeAD	Administrator
Vidar Pedersen	Hk-dir	Administrator

== ACA History ==
ACA was founded in June 1993 by the British Council, the German Academic Exchange Service (DAAD) and the Netherlands Organization for International Cooperation in Higher Education (NUFFIC). These organisations supported, and still support, on behalf of their governments, bilateral international cooperation of their countries' higher education institutions. They felt the need for a common European platform as the importance and number of European Union (EU) programmes in education and training was growing.

ACA membership soon expanded. In tribute to the EU enlargement and with a view to promote the setting up of independent internationalisation agencies in Central and Eastern Europe, full membership was extended from the EU and EFTA countries to the whole of Europe in 1998.

Throughout its history, ACA has provided the European Commission and other international bodies with background research on issues of international cooperation in higher education. In 1999, the association started its own publication series, the ACA Papers on International Cooperation in Higher Education.

== ACA Members ==
Organisation	Country	Membership Status
Agentur für Bildung und Internationalisierung (OeAD)	Austria	Full
Vluhr International	Belgium	Full
The Agency for Mobility and EU Programmes (AMEUP)	Croatia	Full
Dům zahraniční spolupráce (DZS)	Czech Republic	Full
Education and Youth Board of Estonia (HARNO)	Estonia	Full
Finnish national Agency for Education (EDUFI)	Finland	Full
German Academic Exchange Service (DAAD)	Germany	Full
Greek State Scholarships Foundation (IKY)	Greece	Full
Tempus Public Foundation (TPF)	Hungary	Full
The Icelandic Centre for Research (Rannís)	Iceland	Full
Uni Italia	Italy	Full
Nuffic - The Dutch Organisation for Internationalisation in Education	Netherlands	Full
Norwegian Agency for International Cooperation and Quality Enhancement in Higher Education (Hkdir)	Norway	Full
Polish National Agency for Academic Exchange (NAWA)	Poland	Full
Erasmus + Portuguese National Agency, Education and Training (A.N E+EF)	Portugal	Full
Slovak Academic Information Agency (SAIA)	Slovakia	Full
The Centre of the Republic of Slovenia for Mobility and European Educational and Training Programmes (CMEPIUS)	Slovenia	Full
Spanish Service for the Internationalization of Education	Spain	Full
Swedish Council for Higher Education (UHR)	Sweden	Full
Movetia Swiss National Agency for Exchange and mobility	Switzerland	Full
Rectors' Conference of the Swiss Universities (Swissuniversitites)	Switzerland	Full
The International Education Center (IEC)	Georgia	Associate
ETS Global	United States of America	Associate
Institute of International Education (IIE)	United States of America	Associate

== ACA Publications ==
=== ACA Papers on International Cooperation in Education ===
In 1999, ACA started its own monograph series, the ACA Papers on International Cooperation in Education which are published by Lemmens Medien in Bonn, Germany. Most of the books emerged from ACA's projects in the field of analysis and research on internationalisation of higher education. Examples of the ACA Papers are:

- International Student Support in European Higher Education. Needs, Solutions, and Challenges (2010)
- English-Taught Programmes in European Higher Education. The Picture in 2007 (2008)
- The Professional Value of ERASMUS Mobility. The Impact of International Experience on Former Students' and on Teachers' Careers (2009).

=== Other Publications on Internationalisation of Higher Education ===
ACA also publishes the ACA Newsletter – Education Europe, a monthly newsletter which provides policy-makers and practitioners world-wide with concise and up-to-date information on the developments in higher education policy at the national, European and global level. It also highlights important events, presents recent research on education and training matters and informs on the latest European Union funding opportunities.

Apart from the ACA Papers series, ACA Think Pieces and the ACA Newsletter, ACA publishes also a collection of reference works about trends and data of internationalisation in Europe and around the world. Examples are the EUA/ACA Internationalisation Handbook (2010), Handbook of International Associations in Higher Education (2009), and EURODATA – Student Mobility in European Higher Education (2006).

== List of ACA Presidents ==
- Gro Tjore (2024)
- Ulrich Grothus (2018–2024), Former Deputy Secretary-General, German Academic Exchange Service (DAAD)
- Sijbolt Noorda (2011–2017), President, Association of Universities in the Netherlands (VSNU)
- Rolf Tarrach (2008–2011), Rector, University of Luxembourg
- Sir Peter Scott (2002–2008), Vice-Chancellor, University of Kingston
- Konstantinos Kerameus (1996–2002), Professor, University of Athens, School of Law
- Eduardo Marçal Grilo (1993–1995), Member of the Board of Trustees, Calouste Gulbenkian Foundation, Lisbon
