= Strategic enrollment management =

Education administration planning method

Strategic Enrollment Management (SEM) is an element of planning for new growth at a university or college as it concerns both academic program growth and facilities needs.

SEM emerged in the United States as a response to fluctuations in student markets and increasing pressure on recruitment strategies in higher education. It focuses on achieving student success throughout their entire life cycle with an institution while increasing enrollment numbers and stabilizing institutional revenues. SEM strategies accomplish the fulfillment of an institution's mission and student experience goals by strategically planning enrollments through recruiting, retaining and graduating specific cohorts of students followed by targeted practices to build a lifelong affinity with the institution among alums. In addition to a focus on student achievement, SEM also fundamentally understands the student as holding the role of a learner in addition to a customer and citizen of the global community.

Originating at Boston College in the 1970s as a reaction to fluctuating student enrollment markets and increased pressure on recruitment strategies, SEM was created and developed into a critical pillar in the institutional planning process. Although originating as an American concept and practice, the same requirement for response to demographic shifts and increasing competitiveness among institutions can be seen in other nations with substantial footholds in higher education such as Canada. Despite originating as an American experience, the critical issues Canadian post-secondary institutions face are similar enough in nature to those at American institutions that applications can be borrowed across the border.

== History ==
The Evolution of Strategic Enrollment Management (SEM) resulted from the work of a number of people and organizations since schools started being concerned with this area in the early 1970s. Boston College (through the work of Jack Maguire in 1976) and Northwestern University (through the work of William Ihlanfeldt) began to use research and specific communication strategies to increase enrollment at their schools. The idea of research and using the data to target communication and marketing efforts resulted in positive enrollment numbers and drew several entrepreneurs into the field of managing enrollments. Jack Maguire subsequently created and named the first enrollment management model for recruitment and retention of students.

In 1975, Stuart Weiner and Drs. Ron and Dori Ingersoll formed one of the earliest teams that addressed enrollment issues from the point of view of the total enrollment effort. Gradually, the Ingersolls and others made enrollment efforts more effective by strategically addressing schools, data, academic offerings, and student services—and included retention in the overall effort.

In the late 1970s, the practice of Strategic Enrollment Management (SEM) was born. Since that time, organizations such as Noel-Levitz, Williams and Associates, and the American Association of Collegiate Registrars and Admissions Officers (AACRAO) have continued to refine the concept.

It wasn't until 1990 that AACRAO established the term, "Strategic Enrollment Management", and started the first annual SEM conference, specifically focused on pressing issues and effective practices in Strategic Enrollment Management. Beginning in 2009, AACRAO developed the first SEM Award of Excellence to recognize outstanding achievement and visionary leadership in Strategic Enrollment Management.

Bob Bontrager, Sr. Director of AACRAO Consulting and SEM Initiatives edited some of the first books on SEM:

- SEM and Institutional Success: Integrating Enrollment, Finance and Student Access (2008)
- Applying SEM at the Community College (2009)

In 2012, Dr. Ron Ingersoll and Dr. Dori Ingersoll, with Dr. Bob Bontrager, co-edited the book Strategic Enrollment Management: Transforming Higher Education. This SEM compendium was published for the higher education profession by AACRAO. EMAS Pro then initiated the industry's first monthly Strategic Enrollment Management webinar series, as a companion to the Strategic Enrollment Management: Transforming Higher Education book. The Ingersolls serve as primary SEMinar session co-presenters.

In recent years, AACRAO has published additional books on SEM that include:

- SEM in Canada: Promoting Student and Institutional Success in Canadian Colleges and Universities (2011)
- Strategic Enrollment Management: Transforming Higher Educations (2012)
- Handbook of Strategic Enrollment Management (2014)
- SEM Core Concepts: Building Blocks for Institutional and Student Success (2017)

== Considerations ==
The functional aspects of what a SEM operation considers and works to advance and optimize can include:

- Characteristics of the institution and the world around it
- Institutional mission and priorities
- Optimal enrollments (number, quality, diversity)
- Student recruitment
- Student fees and Financial aid
- Transition
- Retention
- Graduation Rates
- Institutional marketing
- Career counseling and development
- Academic advising
- Curricular and program development
- Methods of program delivery
- Quality of campus life and facilities
- Evaluation of assessment outcomes of institutional initiatives

== Software ==
As enrollment moved from a focus on marketing to including the whole institution, the need grew for software that offered better ways to communicate and work with students and parents. In the mid-1980s, the Ingersoll Group and Tom Williams developed the first software to effectively manage the process for students from inquiry to enrollment. This was The Enrollment Management Action System (EMAS™).

Noel-Levitz had developed Dialogue, a Telecounseling software designed for higher education. When Noel-Levitz merged with Williams Crockett, the telecounseling package was merged into EMAS to create EMASPlus – a software system that addressed recruitment.

In 1998, Education Systems Inc. purchased EMAS products to add to software they developed for work with financial aid. At this point, the emphasis was still primarily on marketing and communication efforts. Education Systems, Inc. (doing business as EMAS™ Pro) expanded the original higher-education CRM software into a resource to address the total commitment of schools to manage their enrollment from a strategic point of view. Since then, a number of vendors serving Higher Education have emerged with CRM systems such as Ellucian, Unifyed.com, Jenzabar, and Target X.

Student CRM by Data Harvesting is also a growing popular choice for a student recruitment solution for universities and colleges.

== Common misconceptions ==
According to Bontrager and Kerlin, common misconceptions and sometimes barriers to implementing or moving strategic enrollment management forward within an institution are that strategic enrollment management is:

- a quick fix
- solely an organizational structure
- an enhanced admissions and marketing operation
- a financial drain on the institution
- an administrative function separate from the academic plan and mission of the institution

== Structures ==
SEM operations can take a variety of forms and structures at colleges and universities that prioritize SEM as a part of its planning process from committees made up of key stakeholders from across the institution to stand alone functional units with a senior leader and staff responsible for SEM priorities. When determining which SEM format will be most optimal for any one institution there are a number of key considerations that can be taken into account:

- Residential mix of the institution – campuses that have a greater presence of students in residing in on or around campus housing tend to devote more funds to student programming, campus life initiatives, orientation and health and safety.
- Mandate of the SEM operation – the functional nature of SEM priorities are typically distinct from those of student services units so when championed by a senior student services official there is considerable potential for efficiencies and unity in a common purpose to holistically serve students.
- Funding of SEM initiatives – whether or not there is a reliance on government or tuition funding or other means of financial support can determine the direction of SEM operations.
- Reporting relationships – the direct or indirect relationship of the senior administrator leading SEM initiatives and the President of the institution.
- Personnel qualifications – having competent and capable employees in the existing complement of staff in order to respond to the unique demands of SEM initiatives.

== Notes ==
1. Western Carolina University Office of Institutional Research and Planning
2. Inside Higher Education Enrollment Managers Struggle With Image
3. Thomas Williams, "Enrollment Strategies to Serve Tomorrow's Students," AGB Priorities, 21, spring 2003
4. South East Missouri State University Strategic Enrollment Management
5. Bob Bontrager, C. Kerlin, "Strategic Enrollment Management: Core Concepts and Strategies." November 2004. Orlando, FL: American Association of Collegiate Registrars and Admissions Officers
