= Amputee Coalition of America =

American nonprofit organization

Amputee Coalition
- Abbreviation: AC
- Formation: January 1, 1989; 37 years ago
- Purpose: To reach out to and empower people affected by limb loss to achieve their full potential through education, support and advocacy, and to promote limb loss prevention.
- Headquarters: Washington, D.C.
- Region served: United States
- Interim President and CEO: John Register
- Website: www.amputee-coalition.org

The Amputee Coalition is an American nonprofit organization based in Washington, D.C.

== Outreach programs ==
The Amputee Coalition runs the following programs:

- National Limb Loss Resource Center

The National Limb Loss Resource Center provides comprehensive information and resources free of charge. All of the information provided is reviewed by the Coalition's medical/scientific advisory committee of experts in limb loss. The NLLRC offers a secure online form and a toll-free number to get answers to questions related to limb loss and limb difference.

- Support Groups and Peer Support

The Amputee Coalition recognizes the challenges of recovering from a traumatic event, such as losing a limb or learning that your child will be born with limb loss. With over 300 support groups and over 1,000 peer visitors nationwide, peer support offers emotional support, encouragement, and information vital to a full recovery.

== Publications ==
The Amputee Coalition of America's publications include inMotion magazine, published six times per year, and First Step: A Guide for Adapting to Limb Loss, published every other year and available in both English and Spanish. Another one-time publication is SideStep: A Guide to Preventing and Managing Diabetes.
