= Center for International Stabilization and Recovery =

The Center for International Stabilization and Recovery (CISR), formerly the Mine Action Information Center (MAIC), is a public policy center at James Madison University that manages information, conducts training, holds conferences and workshops, and performs research relevant to humanitarian mine clearance, victim assistance, mine risk reduction and other explosive remnants of war (ERW).

The CISR has a full-time staff that organizes faculty, students and other subject-matter experts into teams to address specific post-conflict issues.

In 2025, Dr. Suzanne Fiederlein retired after a distinguished 26-year tenure as executive director, and as of May 2025, the center is led by the new executive director, Dr. Christina A. Kilby.

== History ==
The program began in 1996 under a directive by the U.S. Under Secretary of Defense for Policy to serve as a humanitarian demining information clearinghouse. In 1997, it was chartered as a Department of Defense Center of Excellence. Starting in 1998, it received support from the Department of State's Vietnam Initiative, and by 2001, the Department of State was the primary supporting agency. The center works internationally; its support network includes United Nations, Canada, Switzerland, and the Slovenia International Trust Fund. In 2008, the name was changed to the present title, and the scope expanded to include all explosive remnants of war and post-conflict recovery issues. From February 2010 to 2019, the center was directed by Dr. Kenneth Rutherford. Dr. Suzanne Fiederlein served as interim director from 2020 to 2025, after which Christina A. Kilby, Ph.D., became the Executive Director. The center celebrated its 25th anniversary in 2021, marking a quarter-century of work in humanitarian development and post-conflict recovery.

== Journal of ERW and Mine Action ==
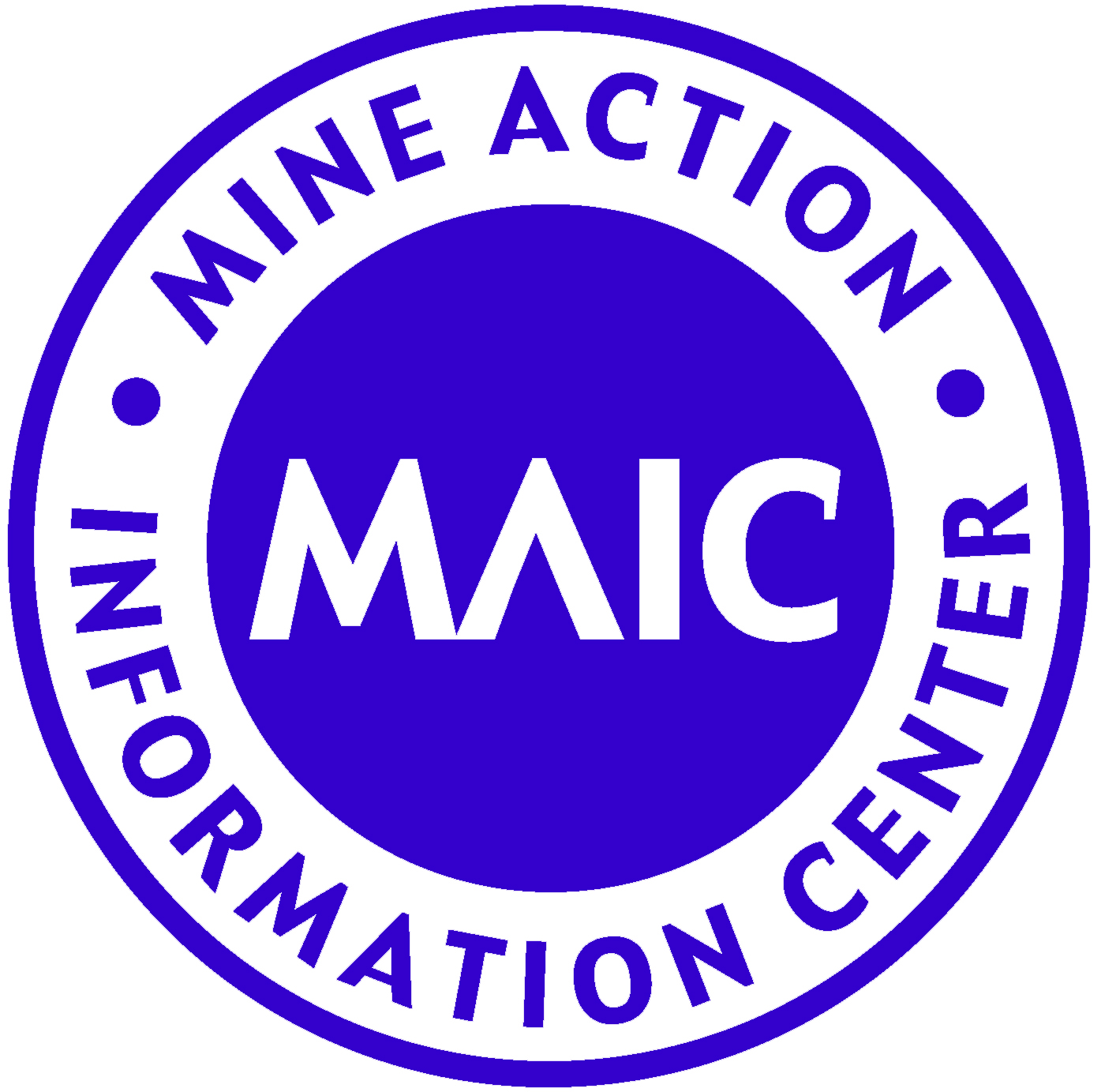
Former logo

The Journal of ERW and Mine Action is a print and online magazine for the global landmine, ERW and post-conflict community. It is published three times a year; the print magazine has a circulation of 1,500, two-thirds outside the US, and the online site receives 135,000 views annually. The journal contains editorials, articles, reports, reviews, profiles dealing with current practices, new equipment and techniques, procedures, lessons learned and newsworthy information. The Journal is written by field experts along with in-house contributions, and is funded by contracts from the United States Department of State's Bureau of Political-Military Affairs, and the United States Department of Defense's Night Vision and Electronic Sensors Directorate.

The Journal of Conventional Weapons Destruction is currently suspended due to loss of funding (as of 2025), and CISR is actively seeking $300,000 in new support to resume publication.

== Peer Support ==
“Pathways to Resilience” (P2R) is a regional leadership and training program for survivors of landmines and explosive ordnance injuries. The program's purpose is to develop self-confidence, emotional and physical health and life direction for landmine survivors while empowering them to help other survivors in their country of origin. The first P2R program hosted 29 landmine survivors for a week-long peer-support program in Hamama, Lebanon from May 8–15, 2011.

CISR continues to expand its P2R model, identifying global needs and aspiring to replicate these workshops in additional conflict‑affected regions.

== Management training ==
CISR, working in close collaboration with faculty from JMU's College of Business (COB), specializes in management training for leaders in mine action around the world. The Senior Managers’ Course in ERW and Mine Action seeks to integrate the latest thinking in the field of business management with the practical experience of ERW/mine action operators. The goal is to hone the skills of senior managers of national ERW and mine action programs so that countries can more effectively and efficiently clear their lands of landmines and other explosive remnants of war that adversely affect their citizens' well-being and impinge upon economic development. Between 2004 and 2013, CISR hosted nine courses on the campus of JMU with 172 participants from 40 countries.

CISR has also conducted regional training courses in Jordan, Colombia, Peru, and Tajikistan, where it held a training program in May 2014.

== Global Mine Action Registry ==
The Global Mine Action Registry is a resource database of contact information on hundreds of mine-action organizations.
