= Emily Osment videography =

Emily Osment video discography
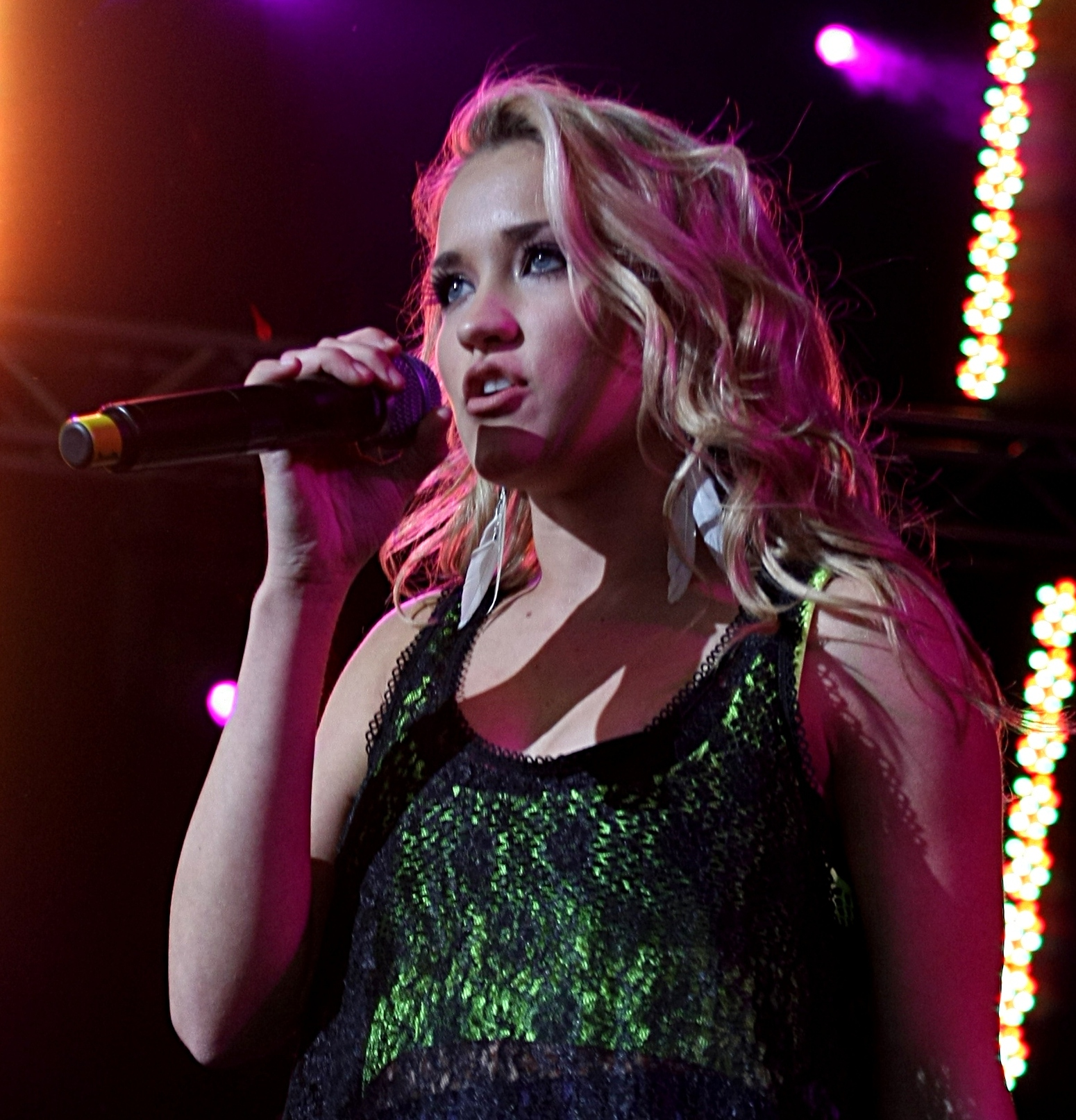
- Osment performing live at KISS concert on May 22, 2010.
- Music videos: 8
- Films: 21
- Television: 15
- Commercials: 3

American actress, singer, and songwriter Emily Osment has appeared in music videos, films, and television series. Since 2014, Osment has starred as Gabi Diamond in the show Young & Hungry. In 2011, Osment starred in the movie Cyberbully, whose soundtrack includes the song Drift. Her other films include the role of Lilly Truscott in the Disney Hannah Montana: The Movie (2009), Dadnapped (2009), Kiss Me (2014); among others. In 2014, her song "In Case Of Fire" was part of the soundtrack of the film A Daughter's Nightmare, in which she is the protagonist.

In 2009, Osment released her first official music video for the first single "All The Way Up" from her EP All the Right Wrongs. Her second music video was "You Are The Only One", the second single from her EP.

On October 5, 2010 she released her debut album Fight or Flight, Osment released music videos for the singles "Let's Be Friends" and "Lovesick".

Osment has been a guest artist for songs such as "If I Didn't Have You" (2007) with Mitchel Musso, ex co-star of Hannah Montana in which Osment appeared in the music video, and "Hush" (2011) with Josh Ramsay. She also made a guest appearance in the music video "Midnight Romeo" (2009) by the pop and rock band Push Play.

== Music videos ==
Key
†	Denotes music videos that have not yet been released

Year	Title	Other performer(s)	Album	Ref.
2007	"If I Didn't Have You"	Mitchel Musso	Disneymania 6	
2007	"I Don't Think About It"	—	The Haunting Hour: Don't Think About It	
2008	"Once Upon a Dream"	—	Princess Disneymania	
2009	"All The Way Up"	—	All the Right Wrongs	
2009	"Hero In Me"	—	Disney Channel Playlist	
2010	"You Are The Only One"	—	All the Right Wrongs	
2010	"Let's Be Friends"	—	Fight or Flight	
2010	"Lovesick"	—	Fight or Flight	

=== Lyric videos ===
Year	Title	Performer(s)	Album	Ref.
2014	"In Case Of Fire"	Emily Osment	A Daughter's Nightmare Soundtrack	

=== Guest appearances ===
Year	Title	Performer(s)	Album	Ref.
2009	"Midnight Romeo"	Push Play	Found	
2019	"Not My Proudest Moment"	Anna Akana	Casualty	

== Commercials ==
Year	Promoting	Description	Ref.
1997	McDonald's	Notice of American food.	
1998	McDonald's	Notice of American food.	
2009	Disney's Friends for Change	Promotes cleaning up the environment.	

== Filmography ==
=== As herself ===
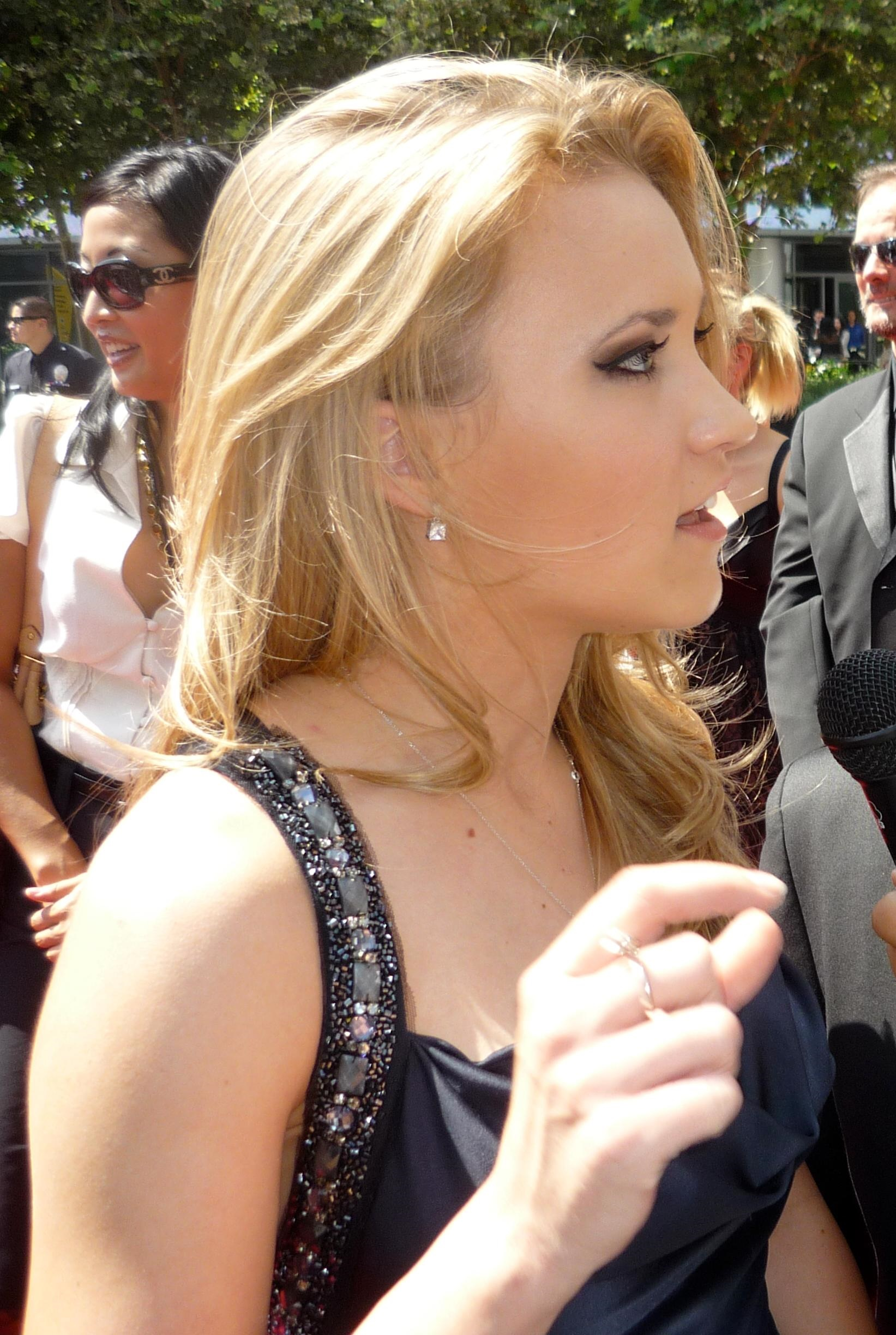
At the Hannah Montana: The Movie premiere on April 2, 2009

Year	Title	Notes	Ref.
2006–2007	Disney Channel Games	Part of the green team and yellow	
2007	Punk'd	1 episode	
2006–2009	Disney 365	3 episodes	
2007–2008	Disney's Really Short Report	"Episode dated 31 March 2007" (Season 1, Episode 6) "Hannah Montana: The Complete First Season" (Season 2, Episode 13)	
2008	Disney Channel's Totally New Year	Special program of Disney Channel	
2009	Leo Little's Big Show	"Dadnapped & Hatching Pete Double Feature" (Season 1, Episode 5) "Sonny with a Chance: Sonny's Big Break" (Season 1, Episode 9)	
2009	Disney Channel New Year Star Showdown	Special program of Disney Channel	
2010	The Ro and Co Show	"New Music Moment Featuring Miley Cyrus and Emily Osment" (Season 1, Episode 15)	
2010	Jonas	"Boat Trip" (Season 2, Episode 11)	
2012	Life with Boys	"Double Trouble with Boys" (Season 1, Episode 11)	
2014	2014 Radio Disney Music Awards	Introducing Austin Mahone	
2015	The Chew	"Sensational Sandwiches" (Season 4, Episode 131)	
2015-2016	The Rachael Ray Show	"Get Rid of Cellulite in Time for Summer" (Season 9, Episode 138) "She's the Star of "Orange Is the New Black" - Laura Prepon Is Here, and She's Cooking Up Two Dishes from Her New Cookbook!" (Season 10, Episode 115)	
2016	Hollywood Today Live	Episode: "Lisa Edelstein/Emily Osment & Jonathan Sadowski"	

== See also ==
- Emily Osment discography
