= Emily Osment discography =

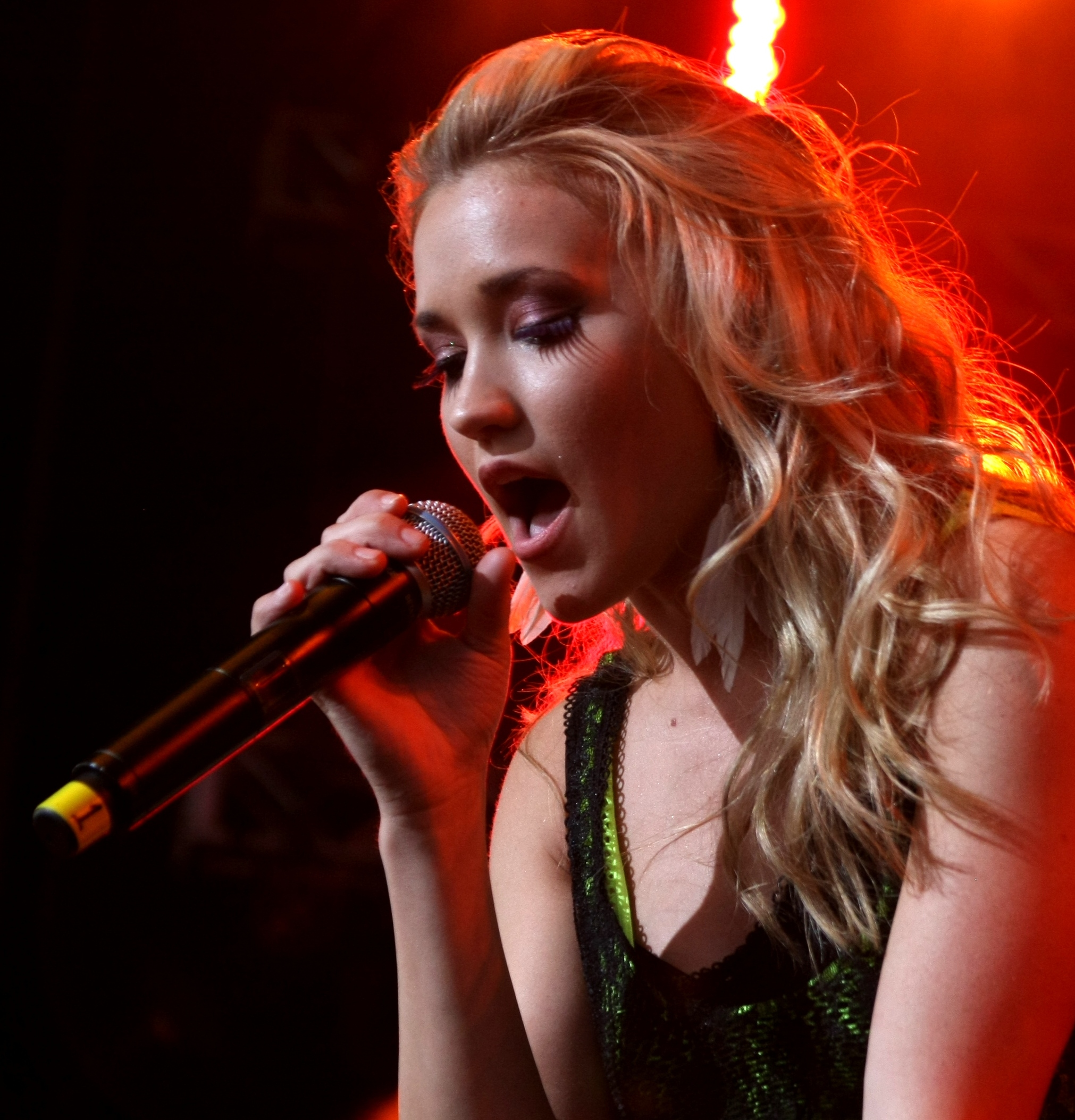
- Osment performing live in May 2010
- Studio albums: 1
- Extended plays: 2
- Singles: 13
- Promotional singles: 5
- Music videos: 8

The discography of American actress and singer Emily Osment consists of one studio album, two extended plays (EPs), 13 singles (including two as featured artist) and five promotional singles. Osment released her debut EP, All the Right Wrongs, on October 27, 2009 under Wind-up Records, to mixed reviews. It was preceded by the lead single "All the Way Up", which peaked at number 76 on the Canadian Hot 100. The EP spawned a second single, "You Are the Only One", but it failed to chart anywhere. Osment released her debut studio album, Fight or Flight, on October 5, 2010 under Wind-up Records. It was preceded by two singles "Let's Be Friends" and "Lovesick". Osment also released "Hush", a duet with Josh Ramsay and "Drift", from the film Cyberbully, in 2011.

In 2019, she began releasing music under the alias Bluebiird, and her first single "Black Coffee Morning" was released on March 8. Later that year, she released the EP, When I Loved You.

== Albums ==
=== Studio albums ===
List of studio albums, with selected chart positions
Title	Album details	Peak chart positions		
Title	Album details	US	US Heat	SPA
Fight or Flight	Released: October 5, 2010; Formats: CD, digital download; Label: Wind-up Records	170	2	76

== Extended plays ==
List of studio albums, with selected chart positions
Title	EP details	Peak chart positions		
Title	EP details	US	US Heat.	CAN
All the Right Wrongs	Released: October 26, 2009; Formats: CD, digital download; Label: Wind-up Records	117	1	54
When I Loved You (as Bluebiird)	Released: September 27, 2019; Formats: digital download; Label: Bluebiird Music	—	—	—
"—" denotes releases that did not chart or were not released in that territory.

== Singles ==
=== As lead artist ===
List of singles, with selected chart positions
Title	Year	Peak chart positions									Album
Title	Year	US Dance	CAN	CZE	GER	JPN	LTH	KOR	SCO	UK	Album
"All the Way Up"	2009	—	76	—	—	—	—	156	—	—	All the Right Wrongs
"You Are the Only One"	2010	—	—	—	—	—	—	—	—	—	All the Right Wrongs
"Let's Be Friends"	2010	31	—	70	67	24	—	102	—	—	Fight or Flight
"Lovesick"	2010	—	66	—	—	—	60	2	45	57	Fight or Flight
As Bluebiird
"Black Coffee Morning"	2019	—	—	—	—	—	—	—	—	—	When I Loved You
"Sailor"	2019	—	—	—	—	—	—	—	—	—	When I Loved You
"Good Girl"	2019	—	—	—	—	—	—	—	—	—	When I Loved You
"I Say a Little Prayer"	2020	—	—	—	—	—	—	—	—	—	Non-album singles
"Porcelain Doll"	2024	—	—	—	—	—	—	—	—	—	Non-album singles
"Paranoia Boys"	2024	—	—	—	—	—	—	—	—	—	Non-album singles
"Real People"	2024	—	—	—	—	—	—	—	—	—	Non-album singles
"—" denotes a recording that did not chart or was not released in that territory.

=== As featured artist ===
List of singles as featured artist
Song	Year	Album
"I Feel the Earth Move" (Micky Dolenz featuring Emily Osment)	2010	King for a Day
"Asteroid Belt" (Tio featuring Bluebiird)	2022	Non-album single

=== Promotional singles ===
List of promotional singles, with selected chart positions
Title	Year	Peak chart positions		Album
Title	Year	US Bub.	CAN	Album
"I Don't Think About It"	2007	—	—	Non-album promotional single
"If I Didn't Have You" (with Mitchel Musso)	2008	10	—	DisneyMania 6
"Run, Rudolph, Run"	2009	—	—	Non-album promotional singles
"Drift"	2011	—	—	Non-album promotional singles
"Hush" (with Josh Ramsay)	2011	—	90	Non-album promotional singles

== Other appearances ==
Title	Year	Other artist(s)	Album
"Don't Ya Just Love Christmas"	2006	—N/a	Holidaze: The Christmas That Almost Didn't Happen
"One Day"	2006	—N/a	Holidaze: The Christmas That Almost Didn't Happen
"You've Got a Friend"	2007	Billy Ray Cyrus	Home at Last
"Once Upon a Dream"	2008	—N/a	Princess DisneyMania
"Hero In Me"	2009	—N/a	Disney Channel Playlist
"Wherever I Go" (Note: Played during the series' finale but didn't appear in the show's soundtrack.)	2010	Miley Cyrus as Hannah Montana	Hannah Montana Forever
"In Case Of Fire"	2014	—N/a	A Daughter's Nightmare

== Music videos ==
Title	Year	Director	Notes
"I Don't Think About It"	2007	—N/a	
"Once Upon a Dream"	2008	—N/a	
"If I Didn't Have You"	2008	—N/a	With Mitchel Musso
"Hero In Me"	2009	—N/a	
"All the Way Up"	2009	Roman White	
"You Are the Only One"	2010	Aaron A	
"Let's Be Friends"	2010	Emily Osment	
"Lovesick"	2011	Daniel "Cloud" Campos	
"In Case Of Fire"	2014	Sepia Films	
