= When I Loved You =

When I Loved You may refer to:

- When I Loved You (Emily Osment EP) (2019)
- "When I Loved You", a 1960 song by the Louvin Brothers from My Baby's Gone

== See also ==
- "Quand je t'aime" or "When I Love You", a 1987 song by Demis Roussos
