= Fight or Flight (Emily Osment album) =

2010 studio album by Emily Osment

Studio album by Emily Osment
- Released: October 5, 2010
- Recorded: 2009–2010
- Genres: Electropop; dance-pop
- Length: 35:16
- Labels: Wind-up; EMI; The Bicycle Music Company
- Producers: Nellee Hooper; Toby Gad

Emily Osment chronology
All the Right Wrongs (2009)	Fight or Flight (2010)	When I Loved You (2019)

Singles from Fight or Flight
- 1. "Let's Be Friends" Released: June 8, 2010; 2. "Lovesick" Released: October 19, 2010

Fight or Flight is the only studio album by American actress and singer Emily Osment. The album was released on October 5, 2010 through Wind-Up Records. She has worked with producers from her previous musical efforts such as Matthew Bair, as well as Toby Gad, Nellee Hooper and Mandi Perkins. Fight or Flight mainly draws from the genre of electropop while having dance-pop elements, and containing dancehall and techno, among other influences.

The album has received generally positive reviews from critics, with most stating it is an improvement from her debut EP All the Right Wrongs. The album peaked at number seventy-two in Spain and debuted in the United States at number 170 on the Billboard 200 chart. The lead single "Let's Be Friends", debuted and peaked at number twenty-four on the Billboard Japan Hot 100 chart, making the song Osment's first top-thirty hit as a single and her most successful single to date. In addition, the single was also successful in Germany, peaking at number sixty-seven and remained in the German charts for over six weeks. The follow-up single, "Lovesick", was also a commercial success, peaking at number sixty-six in Canada, making it her highest charting single in the country. It also became her first song to chart in the United Kingdom, where it peaked at number fifty-seven.

== Background ==
In an interview with disneydreaming.com, Osment stated that she had begun working on the album in October, and had quickly rushed to finish it. In the interview, she revealed that she had co-written a song for the album, titled "1-800 Clap Your Hands", and that it would possibly be on her upcoming album. In December 2009, Osment announced plans to start work on her full-length debut album, after promotion for All the Right Wrongs had ended. She continued to write songs while filming the third season of Hannah Montana. She stated that the sound on the album would be different than the music heard on her debut extended play, calling it more of a "mature" sound.

On March 24, Osment confirmed on Good Day NY that her debut album was set to be released in the Summer 2010. On June 7, 2010, Osment premiered the album's lead single, "Let's Be Friends" on JSYK.com. On June 3, Osment announced that the album was being pushed back for release in the fall, and later confirmed the album's release date to be October 5, 2010, as well as announcing the official title to be Fight or Flight. The cover art was revealed August 17, and the track list being revealed on August 20. When asked about the title of the album, Osment stated

[...] Fight or Flight is a reaction that we have when faced with fear. It’s an uncontrollable, spontaneous reaction when faced with something you’re really afraid of. I’ve always loved that concept that your brain and your body take over, and when it came to this record I started listening to more diverse, different types of bands and I wanted to do what I wanted to do, and I was fighting what I was writing in the past and whatever thoughts anybody else might have, and working to write the music that I love.

The music video for "Let's Be Friends" debuted on Osment's official website on August 23, 2010. She performed the single on The Dome 55. On September 7, the album's second single, "Lovesick", debuted on JSYK.com to generally positive reviews. It was sent to radio on October 19, 2010 and the music video was released on January 14, 2011.

== Composition ==
The album has primarily a dance-pop feel to it, unlike her previous songs. Seventeen Magazine said of the album's composition, " In her first single, “All The Way Up,” she told us, “I like to keep my suitcase packed, cause I’m going far,” and that, she has! Emily has strayed away from her first EP, “All The Right Wrongs” indie vibe, giving her new eleven-song album a more pop-dance feel. The name "Fight or Flight" comes from, Emily's own ambitions to fight through personal anxieties to achieve simultaneous success in two very competitive fields. The first single from Fight or Flight, “Let’s Be Friends,” showcases Emily's ability to make a hit pop-rock song, without sounding manufactured or over-produced. The song has been a popular hit on radio airwaves across the U.S. Other songs likely to be hit singles are "Lovesick," "Truth or Dare," and "All The Boys Want." She slows it down and shows off her vocal ability in "Marisol" and "You Get Me Through." "Right now/live out loud/gotta believe in something," she says in her call-to-action song, "Gotta Believe in Something." If you're in the mood for a high energetic, fun, feel-good song, go right to "Double Talk" or "Get Yer Yah-Yah’s Out." Her song, "1-800 Clap Your Hands (The Water Is Rising)" goes psychedelic-funk while "The Cycle" takes you back to her first EP's alternative-pop feel.

During an interview about the album's musical content, Osment stated,

[...] I don’t want to write songs that are just surface-deep. I want to be in a world where I’m making the kind of music I want to make, and that’s what I’m doing right now. I want to find a balance between Top 40 songs like ‘Lovesick’ and ‘Let’s Be Friends’ and more complex material like ‘Marisol’ and ‘You Get Me Through’. I’ve given 1000% to making this album, and I won’t settle for mediocrity.

SparklingStars commented the album's dance melody, stating, "The track “Lovesick” has a great dance beat to it that will get you off your feet and moving, as well as the songs “Get Yer Yah-Yah’s Out” and “The Cycle.” You Get Me Through and Marisol are the two softer tunes on the album, however I found “You Get Me Through” to be a bit too slow. Marisol on the other hand is an amazing song and Emily's voice sounded beautiful. The songs “Double Talk” and “Truth or Dare” had the same beat to me but they work well with the over all sound of the album; and they are the typical club songs that party goes will jam too. The two tracks I believe has the catchiest beats and lyrics are “All the Boys Want” and “Gotta Believe in Something;” they are must listens. But the outcast song is “1-800 Clap Your Hands (The Water is Rising),” I don't really get the sound of the tune although it might fit with the album something is off with it and I would have preferred them to add another softer track instead. Overall if you're looking for good album to play at your next house party check this one. Emily does take a risk by going into a new path with her music early on but it seem like she knows what style she wants to take on; and after all this is only the first of many records to come I'm sure of it."

== Reception ==
=== Critical reception ===
Professional ratings
Review scores
Source	Rating
AllMusic	2.5/5 stars

The album has been met with generally positive reviews from critics. AllMusic praised Osment and the album, stating, "Fight or Flight sounds like Katy Perry with a sneer, with a sexual undercurrent that runs beneath every song and bubbles to the surface quite often."

=== Chart performance ===
The album peaked at number ten in Brazil and seventy-two in Spain, making the album Osment's first top-ten hit. In the US, it debuted at number 170 on the Billboard 200. It reached number 2 on the Top Heatseekers album chart.

== Promotion ==
Osment promoted the album mainly through musical performances and touring. She has performed the album's lead single, "Let's Be Friends" on The Dome 55 in Germany, as well as on the Canadian television show Toronto Breakfast Television, in which the song was performed acoustically. The single was also premiered and performed live during her "Clap Your Hands Tour" during 2010. On December 23, 2010, Osment performed the album's second official single, "Lovesick" on The View. During 2011, she performed on several television networks in Germany in support of the album. The performances included Osment performing Lovesick, and one performance saw Osment performing her previous single, All the Way Up.

== Singles ==
"Let's Be Friends" was released as the album's lead single. The song was released for digital download on June 8, 2010, and sent for radio airplay on July 7, 2010. Despite a mixed critical reception, "Let's Be Friends" was met with some commercial success. The song debuted and peaked at number twenty-four on the Billboard Japan Hot 100 chart. "Let's Be Friends" became her first song to chart in Germany. It debuted at number 84, and peaked at number 67. Additionally, it became her first song to enter a United States singles chart, when it peaked at number 31 on the Billboard Hot Dance Club Play chart.

"Lovesick" was released on October 19, 2010 as the album's second and final single. Due to the strong digital downloads the song received, "Lovesick" debuted at number 165 on the UK Singles chart. During the week of April 17, 2011, the single entered the Top 100 in the UK, reaching a peak of 67 on the chart. It also became her second single to achieve success on the Canadian Hot 100, where it debuted at number 71, and peaked at number 66.

== Track listing ==
No.	Title	Writer(s)	Producer(s)	Length
1.	"Lovesick"	Emily Osment; Toby Gad; Lindy Robbins	Nellee Hooper	3:26
2.	"Get Yer Yah Yah's Out"	Osment; David Gamson; Shelly Peiken; Oliver Leiber	Hooper	2:57
3.	"1-800 Clap Your Hands (The Water Is Rising)"	Osment; Adam Schlesinger	Hooper	3:35
4.	"Marisol"	Osment; Schlesinger	Hooper	4:16
5.	"The Cycle"	Osment; Derek Fuhrmann	Hooper	2:33
6.	"All the Boys Want"	Osment; Matthew Blair; Ron Aniello	Hooper	2:20
7.	"Double Talk"	Osment; Schlesinger	Hooper	2:54
8.	"Truth or Dare"	Osment; Blair	Hooper	3:04
9.	"Let's Be Friends"	Osment; Gad; Mandi Perkins	Gad	3:02
10.	"You Get Me Through"	Osment; Schlesinger	Hooper	3:48
11.	"Gotta Believe in Something"	Osment; Fuhrmann; Hooper	Hooper	3:21
Total length:				35:16

Digital bonus track
No.	Title	Writer(s)	Length
12.	"The Game (The Cycle)" (acoustic version)	Osment; Fuhrmann	2:11
Total length:			37:27

Japanese bonus track
No.	Title	Writer(s)	Length
12.	"Jerkface Loser Boyfriend"	Osment; Schlesinger	3:34
Total length:			38:50

Brazilian bonus tracks
No.	Title	Writer(s)	Length
12.	"All the Way Up"	Osment; Anthony Fagenson; James Maxwell	3:11
13.	"You Are the Only One"	Osment; Fagenson; Maxwell	2:58
Total length:			41:25

== Personnel ==
Credits for Fight or Flight adapted from Allmusic

- Ron Aniello — composer
- Jake Gosling — keyboards, programming
- Chris Graham — A&R
- Chris Leonard — guitar
- Nicholas Gross — drums, keyboards, programming
- Anthony Vasquez — drums, keyboarding, programming
- Zachary Rae — keyboards
- Nellee Hooper — composer, keyboards, producer, vocal producer
- Scott Hull — mastering
- Oliver Leiber — composer
- Michelle Lukianovich — art direction, package design
- Diana Meltzer — A&R
- Mike Mongillo — product manager
- Emily Osment — composer, vocals
- Bethany Pawluk — art direction
- Mandi Perkins — composer
- Shelly Peiken — composer
- Lindy Robbins — composer
- Ian Rossiter — engineer
- Adam Schlesinger — composer, vocal producer
- Brigette Sire — photography
- Gregg Wattenberg — A&R, production supervisor

== Charts ==
Chart performance for Fight or Flight
Chart (2010)	Peak position
Spanish Albums (Promusicae)	76
US Billboard 200	170

== Release history ==
Release history
Region	Date	Label	Format
Canada	September 28, 2010	Wind-up; EMI; The Bycycle Music Company	CD; digital download
Various	October 5, 2010	Wind-up; EMI; The Bycycle Music Company	CD; digital download
Japan	October 6, 2010	Wind-up; EMI; The Bycycle Music Company	CD; digital download
United States	November 20, 2026	Craft Recordings	LP
