= The Haunting Hour =

The Haunting Hour may refer to:

- The Haunting Hour: Chills in the Dead of Night, 2002 anthology by novelist R.L. Stine
  - The Haunting Hour: Don't Think About It, 2007 film
  - The Haunting Hour: The Series, 2010–2014 TV series
