= Found (Push Play album) =

Third studio album by American pop/rock band Push Play

Studio album by Push Play
- Released: 29 September 2009
- Genre: Rock
- Length: 55:10
- Label: Wind-up Records

Push Play chronology
Dear Santa (2008)	Found (2009)

Singles from Found
- 1. "Midnight Romeo" Released: 14 July 2009

Found is the third studio album by American pop/rock band Push Play. It was released on 29 September 2009.

== Track listing ==
No.	Title	Length
1.	"Watch It Burn"	3.21
2.	"Midnight Romeo"	3:06
3.	"Heart Attack"	3:34
4.	"Taking It Back"	2:42
5.	"My Everything"	4:16
6.	"Covergirl"	3:01
7.	"This Is Us Breaking Up (Better Off)"	3:16
8.	"See My Soul"	2:51
9.	"Barely Legal"	3:27
10.	"Away, Away"	2:56
11.	"Where I Belong"	3:32
12.	"Start Again"	4:48
13.	"Midnight Romeo [Remix]"	3:06
14.	"Dreamers [Bonus Track]"	4:15
15.	"Hush [Bonus Track]"	2:43
Total length:		55:10
