= All the Right Wrongs =

All The Right Wrongs

EP by Emily Osment
- Released: October 26, 2009
- Recorded: 2008–2009
- Genre: Pop rock; alternative rock
- Length: 19:29
- Label: Wind-up
- Producer: Matt Squire; Max Collins (add.); Tony Fagenson (add.)

Emily Osment chronology
All The Right Wrongs (2009)	Fight or Flight (2010)

Singles from All The Right Wrongs
- 1. "All the Way Up" Released: August 25, 2009; 2. "You Are the Only One" Released: February 16, 2010

All the Right Wrongs is the debut EP by American singer-songwriter Emily Osment. The extended play album was released on October 26, 2009, by Wind-up Records. Osment began work on the EP in mid-2008, while filming episodes of the Disney Channel series Hannah Montana. Osment worked with writers and producers such as Max Collins and Tony Fagenson, among others. Osment has stated that the EP is very "spunk", differing to other projects by Disney Channel artists at the time.

The music on All the Right Wrongs mainly incorporates pop-rock characteristics, with emphasis on the bass and drums in the majority of the songs. The album also makes heavy use of auto-tune, and has an indie rock feel to it as well. Osment has stated that Alanis Morissette was one of the biggest influences on the album, and listed Morissette's album, Jagged Little Pill, as a major influence for her music, especially the album's lead single, "All the Way Up". The album itself was given a mixed review from critics, who complimented Osment for signing with Wind-up Records, as opposed to Hollywood Records, as much of the Disney Channel artists do. The album was met with less commercial success in the US however, failing to chart in the upper half of the Billboard 200 album's chart.

The album's lead single, "All the Way Up", was released on August 25, 2009. It was met with mixed reviews from critics, and was successful in Australia and managed peaking in the Canadian Hot 100 chart at number 76. The single garnered success in the Australian Top Hitseekers Chart, where it peaked at number ten becoming Osment's first top ten hit in Australia. The follow-up single, "You Are the Only One", was released to Radio Disney on February 27 the following year. Two more singles were released to Radio Disney as well, including "Average Girl", which was released on March 12, 2010, and "What About Me", released a day later on March 13, 2010. The album was mainly promoted through live performances, most notably during Osment's extensive touring, which included her own tours, "Emily Osment's Halloween Bash", as well as her "Clap Your Hands" tour.

== Background ==
Osment first began work on the album around mid-2008, around the time filming for the second season of Osment's Disney Channel series Hannah Montana had begun. When being interviewed backstage at the 2008 Grammies, Osment stated that she would be working on an upcoming project with Eve 6, presumably for her debut album. While being interviewed about her upcoming album later that year, Osment commented on the sound of the album, saying

“The songs on the album are from four different people, I wrote with four different people, and they all had to fit on the album together…I kind of just did my own thing. I listen to a lot of Alanis Morissette, I kind of got inspired from her and her song “Jagged Little Pill” …There’s a lot of edge to (Emily’s album)…I love hearing the guitars and the drums in the songs.”

Osment later stated that the EP will be released by Wind-up Records on October 27, 2009. Osment later described her music as "definitely Pop but with an alternative rock edge." She has collaborated on songs with Tom Higgenson, Max Collins, Tony Fagenson, Toby Gad and Mandi Perkins. On September 18, 2009, Osment posted the track listing for the album on her official Twitter page.

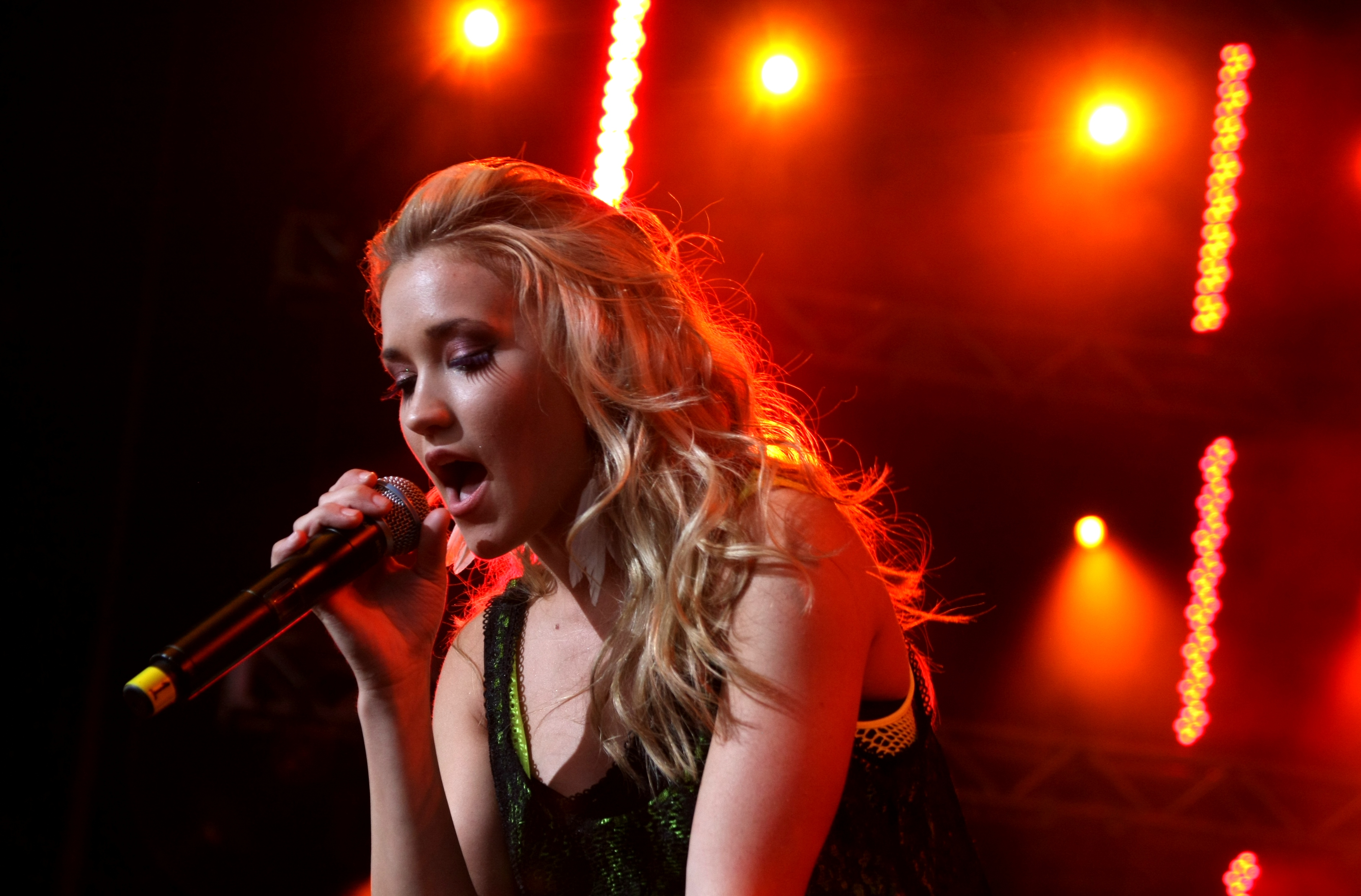
Emily Osment performing live at KISS concert in May 2010

Shortly afterwards, Osment quickly rushed to release her debut album, which later turned into an extended play. Osment announced that the album's first single would be released a few months before the album's release, and a few months later, Wind-up Records announced that "All the Way Up" would be released as the album's lead single on August 25, 2010. The single premiered on Radio Disney to mixed reviews from critics. Osment and her record label quickly realized they needed to promote the album, and Osment began touring with label mates Push Play, who were featured in the music video for "All the Way Up". The two artist touring together later lead to Osment's cameo appearance in the music video for their single, "Midnight Romeo." Osment later embarked on a 4 date tour of Canada as a solo artist. She later embarked on her "Halloween Bash" tour, set in House of Blues locations. After several television appearances, she embarked on her "Clap Your Hands" tour, which had several dates around the US, set in House of Blues locations.

== Composition ==
All the Right Wrongs derives mainly from the genres of rock, alternative, and indie rock while incorporating teen pop themes. The music on the album has been compared to artist such as Alanis Morissette and Radiohead, which are two of Osment's biggest musical inspirations. "All the Way Up" has been called a "fun" song that makes you want to "get up and dance." "Average Girl" has also been accepted by critics as a standout track on the album, stating that it shows off Osment's vocal ability perfectly. "Found Out About You" has been compared to recent releases by P!nk, and the beat of the song has been praised. "I Hate the Homecoming Queen" lyrically speaks of the mean, popular girl that usually dominates high school. The song has been called fun by some critics, yet others have called it "lame" and "immature." "You Are the Only One", the album's second single, has also been a standout track on the album, and has become a fan favorite. "What About Me", the closing track, is the slowest one on the album. Many critics have praised the song, calling it "beautiful.

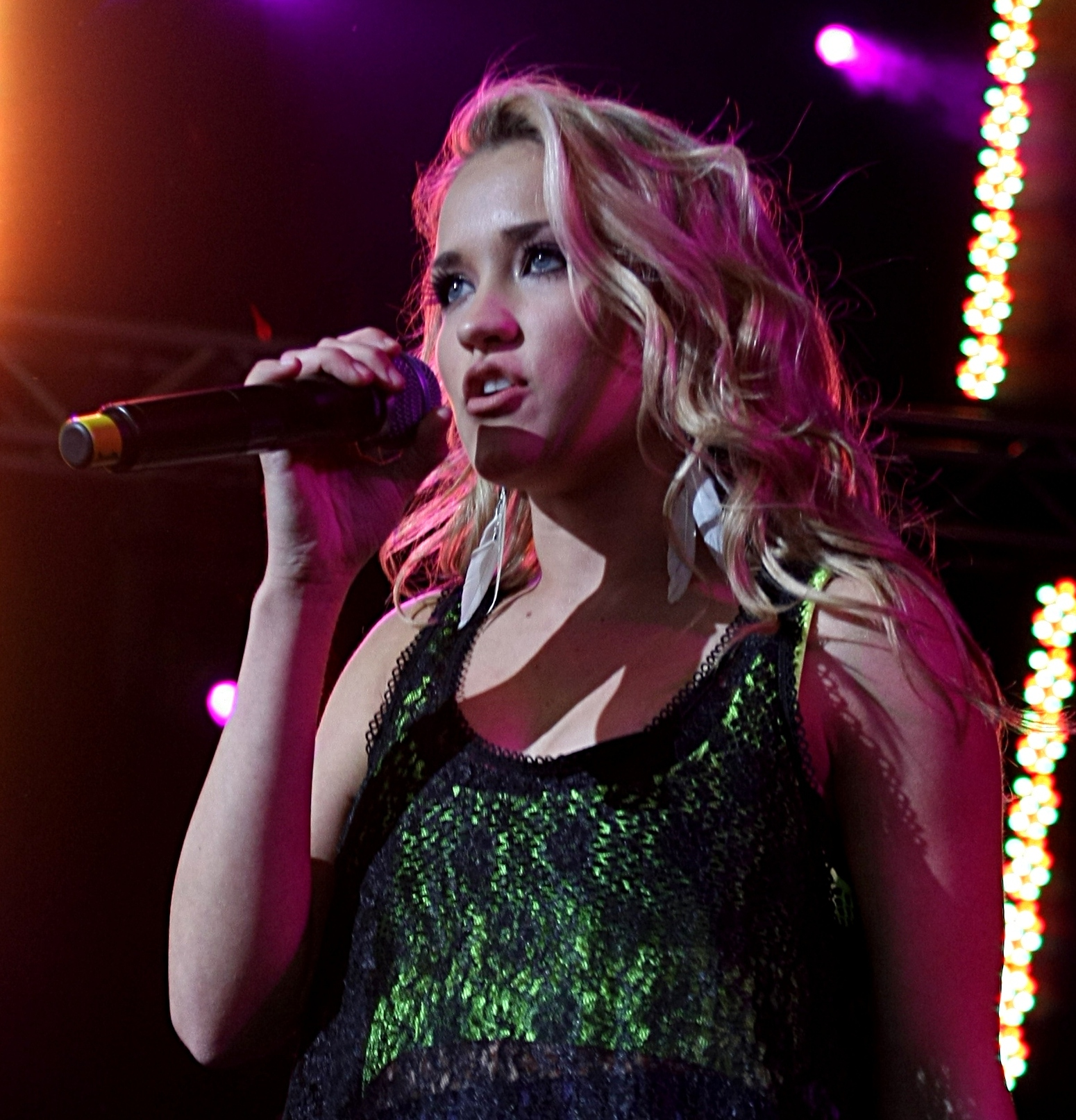
Emily Osment May 2010

== Critical reception ==
Professional ratings
Review scores
Source	Rating
Allmusic	2/5 stars

Allmusic gave the album a less than stellar review, stating that "After flirting with pop and country on her early recordings, Emily Osment underwent a rock & roll makeover for her debut EP, All the Right Wrongs. Songwriting sessions with Eve 6 and Plain White T's yielded enough punky fodder for the disc, and her transformation was further reflected by a retooled MySpace page, which featured pinups of Radiohead, Beck, the Pixies, and other staples of a respectful record collection."

== Singles ==
- "All the Way Up" was released as the lead single from the EP on August 25, 2009. The official music video, directed by Roman White, was released on November 30, 2010. The video features Osment, along with Push Play, performing the song in their apartment building, while the other tenants listen in. The song's lyrics speak of wanting to break free from something, and express yourself. "All the Way Up" debuted at number 77 in the Canadian Hot 100 then a week later peaked at number 76. The song also peaked on the Australian Hitseekers Singles Chart at number 10.
- "You Are the Only One" was released as second single on February 27, 2010. The music video released features Osment standing in the rain with an umbrella, while singing the song after she finds her boyfriend cheating on her at a party. It failed to make an impact on any charts, but enjoyed some success on Radio Disney, peaking at number 3 on the Top 30 songs. Originally, "You Are the Only One" was intended to be released as the lead single from the album, but was dropped due to Osment wanting to release "All the Way Up" instead.

=== Promotional singles ===
- "Average Girl" was released as the third single on Radio Disney on March 12, 2010. It is the second song on the album to be released strictly as a promotional single. Lyrically, the song speaks of being broken up with on Valentine's Day, and the heartbreak that is involved with ending a relationship. Due to the single being released only for Radio Disney, no video was made and the song failed to chart. It did, however, reach number 18 on Radio Disney's Top 30 Songs.
- "What About Me" was released as the third promotional single on March 13, 2010, a day after "Average Girl". The song is a ballad that lyrically speaks of Osment's disappointment that a romance was not like the fairy tales. Due to the single being a promotional release, no video was made. The song received minimum airplay on Radio Disney (due to Average Girl becoming a minor hit on the chart) and failed to chart within Radio Disney's Top 30 Songs.

== Promotion ==
In support of the EP, Osment did many different performances. On October 1, 2009 she had an In-Store Performance at Walmart in San Jacinto, California. On October 27, 2009 she had an autograph signing at Best Buy in Westbury, New York. She was interviewed by Canadian Music TV station Much Music on MuchOnDemand on Thursday, October 29, 2009. She performed her single "All the Way Up" live, while performing "You Are the Only One" for the online site. On the morning of October 30 she performed on Canadian morning show, Breakfast Television.

On Saturday, October 31, 2009 held an event Markville Shopping Centre in Markham, Ontario in support of the EP. The first fans who showed up in costume received free mini-posters. People lined up for bracelets to get Emily's autograph as early as 5 AM. Opening act Jesse Labelle of Toronto, Ontario performed 3 songs before Emily came on stage. Emily performed a full set of songs including all 6 songs of her EP, All the Right Wrongs, of which she was promoting, plus a cover of Radiohead's "High and Dry". After the performance she signed autographs. She was originally only supposed to stay from 1:30 to 2:45, but stayed much past.

She later toured with Push Play from November 12, to November 28. On November 17, 2009 she performed an acoustic version of All The Way Up. On December 13, 2009 she performed at CityWalk’s CityRockin’ Holiday show in Los Angeles. She went on at 7:15pm and had an autograph signing. On December 10, 2009 she announced on MuchOnDemand that she would be having 4-date Canadian tour. The tour lasted from January 7 to January 11.

== Track listing ==
No.	Title	Writer(s)	Length
1.	"All the Way Up"	Emily Osment, Anthony Fagenson, James Maxwell Collins	3:10
2.	"Average Girl"	Osment, Thomas Higgenson	3:27
3.	"Found Out About You"	Osment, Matthew Bair, Tim Pagnotta	3:25
4.	"I Hate the Homecoming Queen"	Osment, Fagenson, Collins	2:48
5.	"You Are the Only One"	Osment, Fagenson, Collins	2:57
6.	"What About Me"	Osment, Bair	3:42
Total length:			19:29

International digital release
No.	Title	Writer(s)	Length
7.	"One of Those Days"	Osment, Fagenson, Collins	3:29
8.	"Unaddicted"	Osment, Fagenson, Collins	3:38
Total length:			26:36

United Kingdom digital release
No.	Title	Length
1.	"All the Way Up"	3:10
2.	"I Hate the Homecoming Queen"	3:22
3.	"Average Girl"	3:24
4.	"You Are the Only One"	2:46
5.	"Found Out About You"	2:55
6.	"What About Me"	3:42
Total length:		19:29

== Personnel ==
Credits for All the Right Wrongs adapted from Allmusic

- Max Collins – additional production (1)
- Bethany Crowley – art direction
- Tony Fagenson – additional production (1)
- Mike Fasano – drum technician
- Larry Goetz – engineer
- Ben Grosse – mixing (1)
- Travis Huff – engineer
- Scott Hull – mastering
- Mark Kiczula – engineer (1)
- J.R. McNeely – mixing (2–6)
- Emily Osment – vocals
- Matt Squire – producer; bass, guitar, and synthesizer (2–6)

== Charts ==
Chart performance for All the Right Wrongs
Chart (2009)	Peak position
Canadian Albums (Billboard)	54
US Billboard 200	117
