= Of Verona =

Indie rock group

of Verona
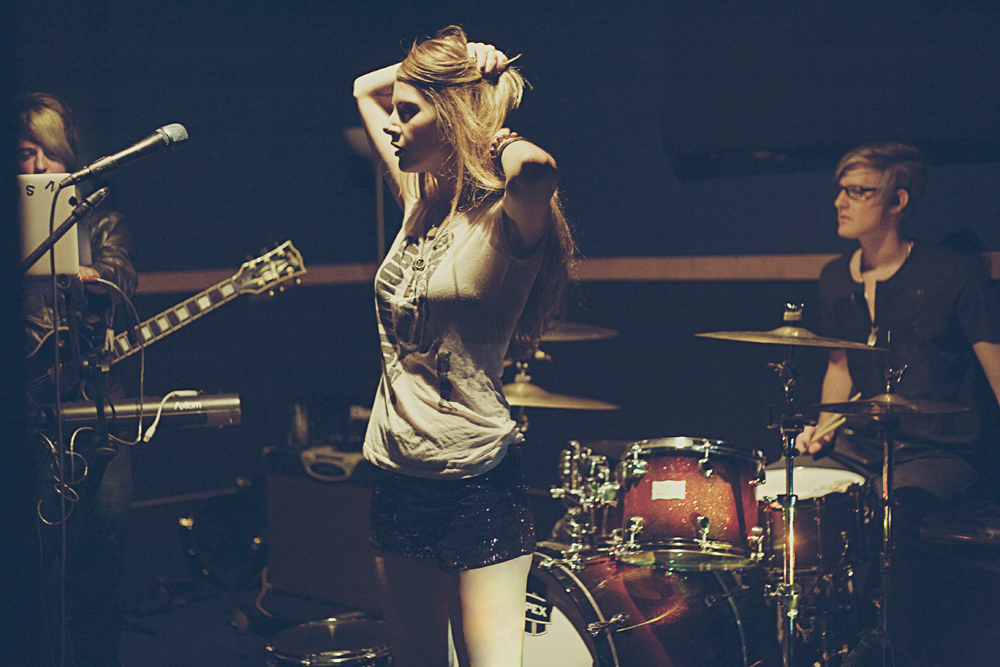
- Dillon Pace, Mandi Perkins, Jeff Sojka; Swing House Studios 2012

Background information
- Origin: Los Angeles, California, USA
- Genres: Art rock, art pop, indie rock, electronica, electro pop
- Years active: 2010–present
- Members: Mandi Perkins; Dillon Pace
- Website: ofverona.com

of Verona is an indie rock group that was formed in Los Angeles in 2010. Their first album, The White Apple, was released on 10 July 2012.

== History ==
=== Formation ===
Dillon Pace was introduced to Mandi Perkins in early 2010 and they formed of Verona shortly thereafter. They invited Jeff Sojka to join the band after a chance meeting at Mikal Blue's Revolver Studios. The band's name is derived from William Shakespeare's The Two Gentlemen of Verona.

=== Fall Like Roses EP (2011) ===
After touring extensively and playing events such as the main stage at the Summerfest music festival in Milwaukee and playing on the opening night of the New Music Seminar, of Verona released their Fall Like Roses EP in July 2011. The EP was available for free download through the band's Facebook page and generated considerable industry praise. MTV Buzzworthy declared them 'One to Watch' and stated, "If you like melodic rock & roll with great female vocals like Florence and the Machine, you'll definitely dig of Verona."

=== The White Apple (2012) ===
After the success of Fall Like Roses, the band began work on their first full-length album, The White Apple. The album was recorded at their Hollywood studio and produced by band member Dillon Pace. It was released on 10 July 2012 and received generally favorable reviews. Lemonade magazine gave it 5 out of 5 stars and stated, "We expected of Verona to come out with a strong debut, but The White Apple is more than just strong. It's a challenge to anyone out there, as if to say 'This is 2012, this is the future of music. Now let's see what the rest of you can do.'" Stereo Subversion gave it an 'A' rating, saying "This is a must-buy album; a potential blockbuster that should be a candidate for top album honors in 2012." iTunes also gave it a very favorable review, stating, "The band blends electronica with a timeless take on alternative pop and forward thinking production, making music that could score a soundtrack to a film that takes place in the not-too-distant future."

The album's lead single, "Castles", received radio play on stations such as KROQ and 98.7FM in Los Angeles, and the song's video was also added to rotation on mtvU. The song "Dark in My Imagination" has been played regularly on specialty stations such as KCRW and reached number one on the Hype Machine chart. Other songs from the album have been used in several television shows, including Teen Wolf, Army Wives, Grimm, Dance Moms, Pretty Little Liars, Finding Carter, Welcome to Sweden, Scream, Riverdale, Rectify on the Sundance Channel and The Real L Word.

The band released its second full-length album, Glass Beach, in 2017.

=== Touring ===
In addition to touring North America, the band toured the UK in April 2013. They have also played at a number of notable music festivals such as Filter magazine's Culture Collide festival, MTV's Woodies Festival, the SXSW Music Festival, the Summerfest Music Festival and Lollapalooza.

== Band members ==
- Dillon Pace – guitars, keyboard, programming, production, mixing
- Mandi Perkins – lead vocals, lyrics, vocal production
- Jeff Sojka – drums, percussion, mixing

== Discography ==
Studio albums:

- 2012: The White Apple
- 2017: Glass Beach

Extended plays:

- 2011: Fall Like Roses

Miscellaneous:

- 2012: Holiday Mixtape
- 2013: The White Apple (Deluxe Edition)
