= Emily Osment =

American actress, singer and songwriter (born 1992)

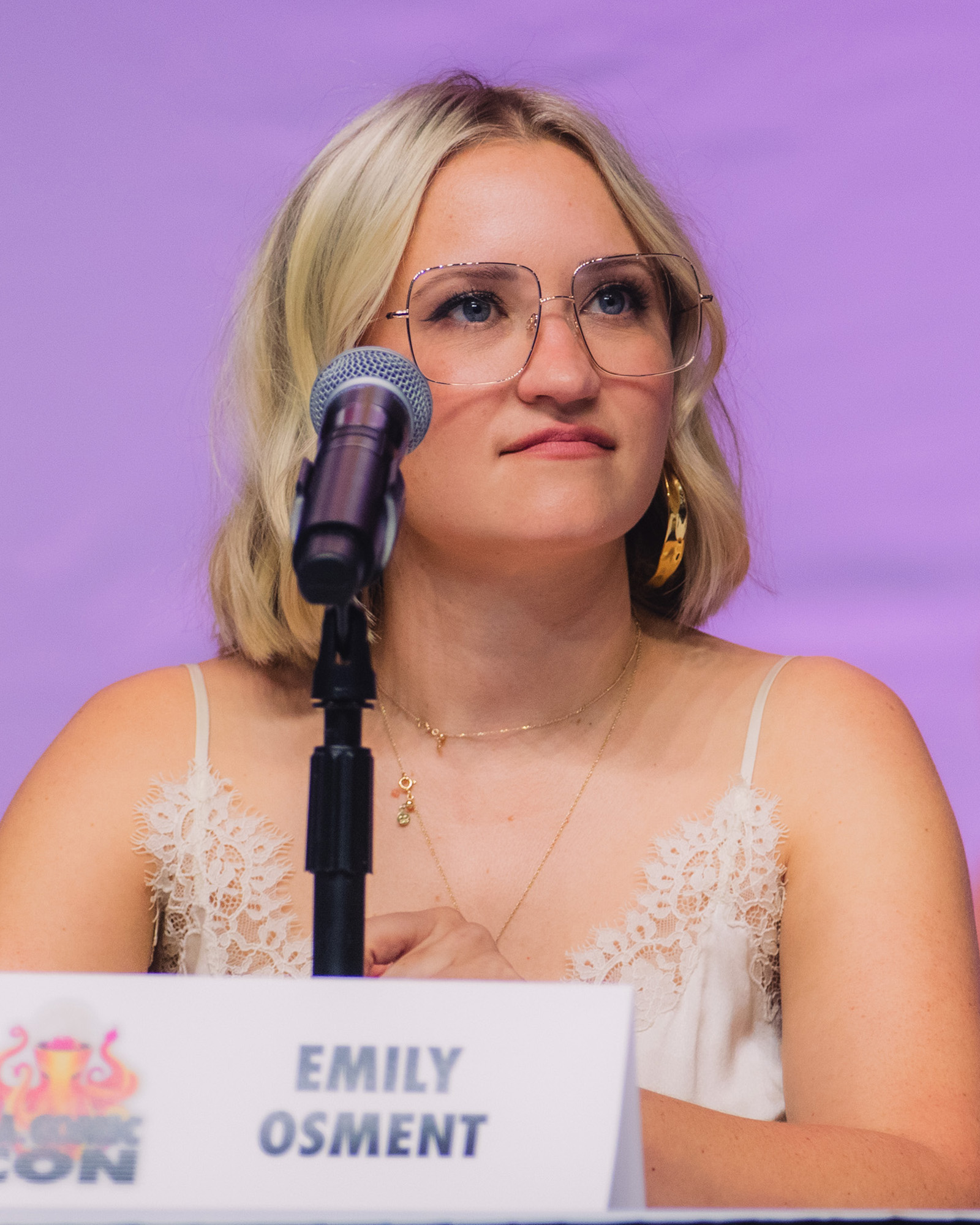
- Osment in September 2025
- Born: Emily Jordan Osment; March 10, 1992 (age 34); Los Angeles, California, U.S.
- Other name: Bluebiird
- Education: Occidental College (Note: She left after her sophomore year to continue her acting career in 2013.)
- Occupations: Actress; singer; songwriter
- Years active: 1997–present
- Spouse: Jack Anthony (m. 2024; div. 2025)
- Relatives: Haley Joel Osment (brother)
- Musical career
- Genre: Pop
- Labels: Wind-up (2009–2011); Bluebiird Music (2019–present)

Emily Jordan Osment (born March 10, 1992) is an American actress, singer, and songwriter. Born and raised in Los Angeles, Osment began her career as a child actress, appearing in numerous television shows and films, before co-starring as Gerti Giggles in Spy Kids 2: The Island of Lost Dreams (2002) and Spy Kids 3-D: Game Over (2003). She gained further recognition for her breakout role as Lilly Truscott on the Disney Channel television series Hannah Montana (2006–2011) and its film Hannah Montana: The Movie (2009).

In the 2010s, Osment starred as Taylor Hillridge in the television film Cyberbully (2011), Roxie on the streaming series Cleaners (2013–2014), Gabi Diamond on the Freeform television series Young & Hungry (2014–2018), for which she received three Teen Choice Award nominations, and Roxy Doyle on the Fox television series Almost Family (2019–2020). From 2018 to 2021, she had a recurring role as Theresa on the Netflix comedy-drama series The Kominsky Method, for which she received two nominations for a Screen Actors Guild Award for Outstanding Performance by an Ensemble in a Comedy Series. In the 2020s, Osment starred as Chelsea on the Netflix sitcom Pretty Smart (2021) and received renewed recognition as Mandy McAllister on the CBS sitcom Young Sheldon (2022–2024) and its spin-off series Georgie & Mandy's First Marriage (2024–present).

Osment came to prominence in music after recording songs for the soundtracks of her Disney projects, most notably a duet of "If I Didn't Have You" with Mitchel Musso in 2007 and a cover of "Once Upon a Dream" in 2008. In 2009, she signed a recording contract with Wind-up Records, with whom she released one extended play, All the Right Wrongs (2009), and one studio album, Fight or Flight (2010). She currently performs under the alias Bluebiird, and has released one extended play, When I Loved You (2019).

== Early life ==
Emily Jordan Osment was born on March 10, 1992, in Los Angeles to actor Michael Eugene Osment and Theresa Osment (née Seifert), an English teacher. She was raised as a Catholic. She attended Chandler Elementary School in Pasadena. Her father has appeared in various films, including her film Soccer Mom, and her older brother is Academy Award-nominee Haley Joel Osment.

== Career ==
=== 1997–2005: Career beginnings ===
Osment's entry into the entertainment industry began in 1997, when she was cast in a commercial for flower delivery company FTD. She was featured in many commercials, after which she made her acting debut in the 1999 film The Secret Life of Girls, starring Eugene Levy and Linda Hamilton. The same year, she co-starred with Glenn Close in the Hallmark Classic television film Sarah, Plain and Tall: Winter's End, a role that would lead to a Young Artist Award nomination. Emily also made a brief appearance in the Smash Mouth music video "All Star" as the girl in the referee uniform. Since then, she has gone on to do a number of roles, such as appearances on television shows like Touched by an Angel, Friends, and 3rd Rock from the Sun.

Osment made her film debut in 2002 as Gerti Giggles in Spy Kids 2: The Island of Lost Dreams, a role for which she won the Young Artist Award for Best Performance in a Feature Film. In 2003, she reprised her role in the third film of the Spy Kids series, Spy Kids 3-D: Game Over, which grossed $197 million worldwide. Osment also voiced roles in Lilo & Stitch 2: Stitch Has a Glitch and Edward Fubbwupper Fibbed Big.

=== 2005–2009: Hannah Montana ===
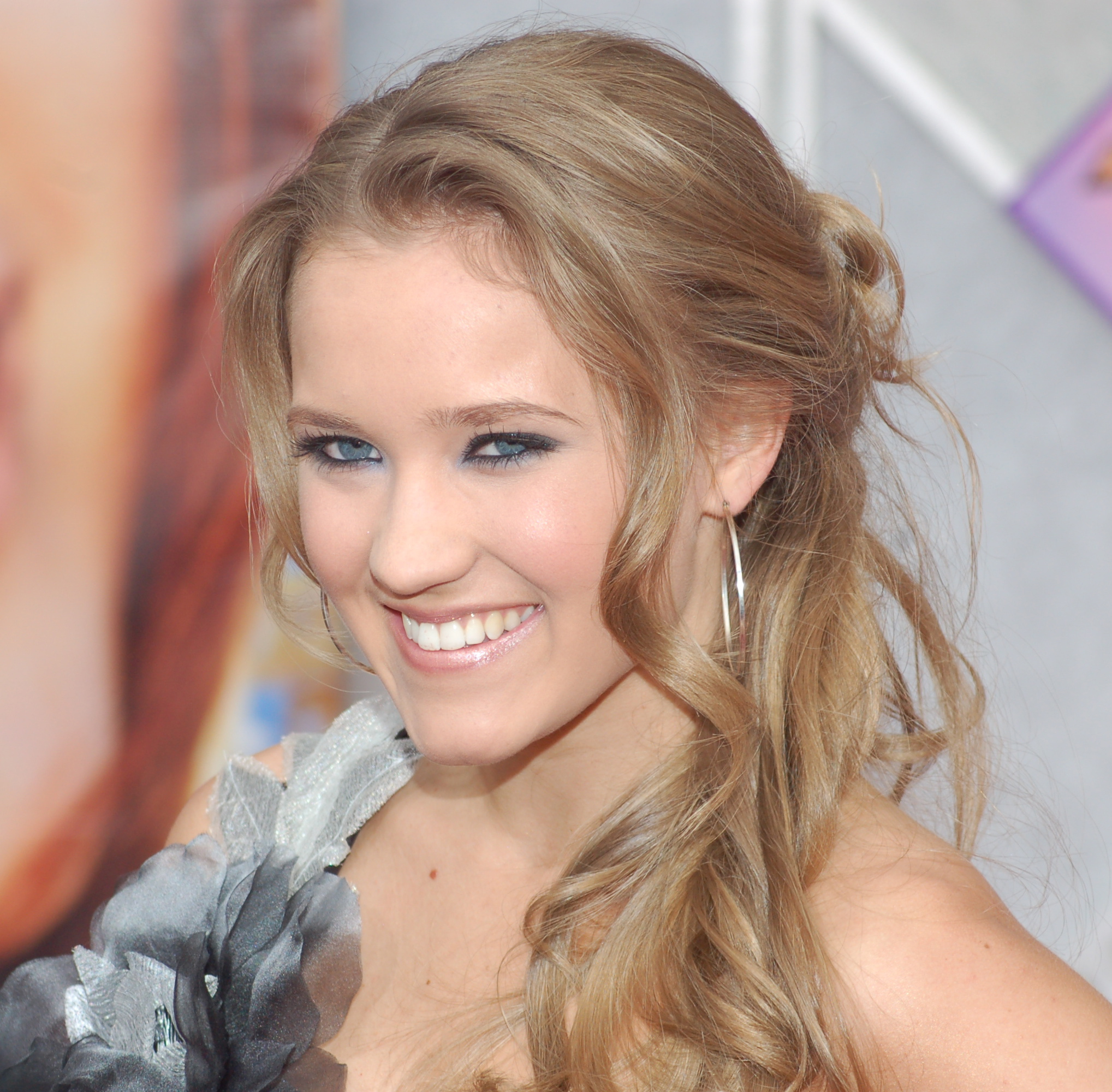
Osment at Hannah Montana: The Movie premiere on April 2, 2009

In 2005, Osment was cast as Lilly Truscott in the Disney Channel series Hannah Montana. Her character was Miley Stewart's best friend and Oliver Oken's girlfriend in seasons 3 and 4. When Miley was Hannah, Lilly was under the alias Lola Luftnagle. The series premiere scored record ratings for the Disney Channel with 5.4 million viewers, a response "beyond our wildest expectations", according to the president of Disney Channel Entertainment. The show earned her a nomination for Young Artist Award in 2007 for Best Performance in a TV Series (Comedy or Drama). In addition, Osment helped to design some of the pieces from the collection of clothing Hannah Montana Disney, which released the last part in the summer of 2006. She also had a voice over role in a movie called Holidaze: The Christmas That Almost Didn't Happen. She performed several songs for the movie, including "Don't Ya Just Love Christmas" and "One Day". Emily sings the chorus of the Billy Ray Cyrus song "You've Got a Friend", from his album 2007 Home at Last. Osment has also recorded a song titled "I Don't Think About It" in The Haunting Hour: Don't Think About It, for which they made a music video. The video was released in Haunting Hour DVD and premiered at Cartoon Network.

On December 25, Osment hosted the Walt Disney World Christmas Day Parade with Hannah Montana co-star Mitchel Musso. The parade featured Miley Cyrus and the High School Musical cast. She and Musso performed a sketch based on a Hannah Montana episode. Osment also had a voice-over role in a movie called Holidaze: The Christmas That Almost Didn't Happen, which also featured the voices of fellow Disney Channel stars Brenda Song and Dylan and Cole Sprouse. Osment performed several songs for the film, including "Don't Ya Just Love Christmas" and "One Day". She also starred as a goth in R. L. Stine's The Haunting Hour: Don't Think About It. It earned her a Young Artist Award nomination in 2008 for "Best Performance in a TV Movie, Miniseries or Special Leading Young Actress". She recorded the song "I Don't Think About It" for the movie's soundtrack.

Osment recorded a remake version of the song "If I Didn't Have You" with Mitchel Musso for the DisneyMania 6 CD. The song was produced by Bryan Todd. The two also filmed a music video for their remake. She recorded a song, released in 2008, with The Disney Channel Circle of Stars. She recorded a remake of "Once Upon A Dream", released on September 12, 2008. She recorded a song called "Hero in Me" for the Disney Channel original movie, Dadnapped and also filmed a music video to accompany it. In 2008 she starred in the film Soccer Mom, and was ranked on No. 1 on Parade magazine and Forbes to Hot Kid Stars to Watch list. She also starred in the Disney Channel original movie, Dadnapped which premiered in February 2009.

=== 2009–2012: All the Right Wrongs and Fight or Flight ===
In June 2009, Osment signed with Wind-Up Records and announced that she was writing and recording tracks with Eve 6. She has collaborated on tunes with Tom Higgenson, Max Collins, Tony Fagenson, Toby Gad and Mandi Perkins. "All the Way Up" was released as the lead single on August 25, 2009. The song debuted at No. 77 in the Canadian Hot 100 then a week later peaked at No. 76. On October 26, 2009, Osment release her debut extended play, All the Right Wrongs, with six songs in the standard edition and eight songs in the deluxe. The EP peaked at No. 117 at Billboard Top 200 and No. 1 at Top Heatseekers About the album, Osment said: "The songs on the album are from four different people, I wrote with four different people, and they all had to fit on the album together...I kind of just did my own thing. I listen to a lot of Alanis Morissette, I kind of got inspired from her and her song "Jagged Little Pill" ...There's a lot of edge to (Emily's album)...I love hearing the guitars and the drums in the songs". "You Are the Only One" was released as second single on February 27, 2010. It failed to make an impact on any charts, but enjoyed some success on Radio Disney. Originally, "You Are the Only One" was intended to be released as the lead single from the album, but was dropped due to Osment wanting to release "All the Way Up" instead.

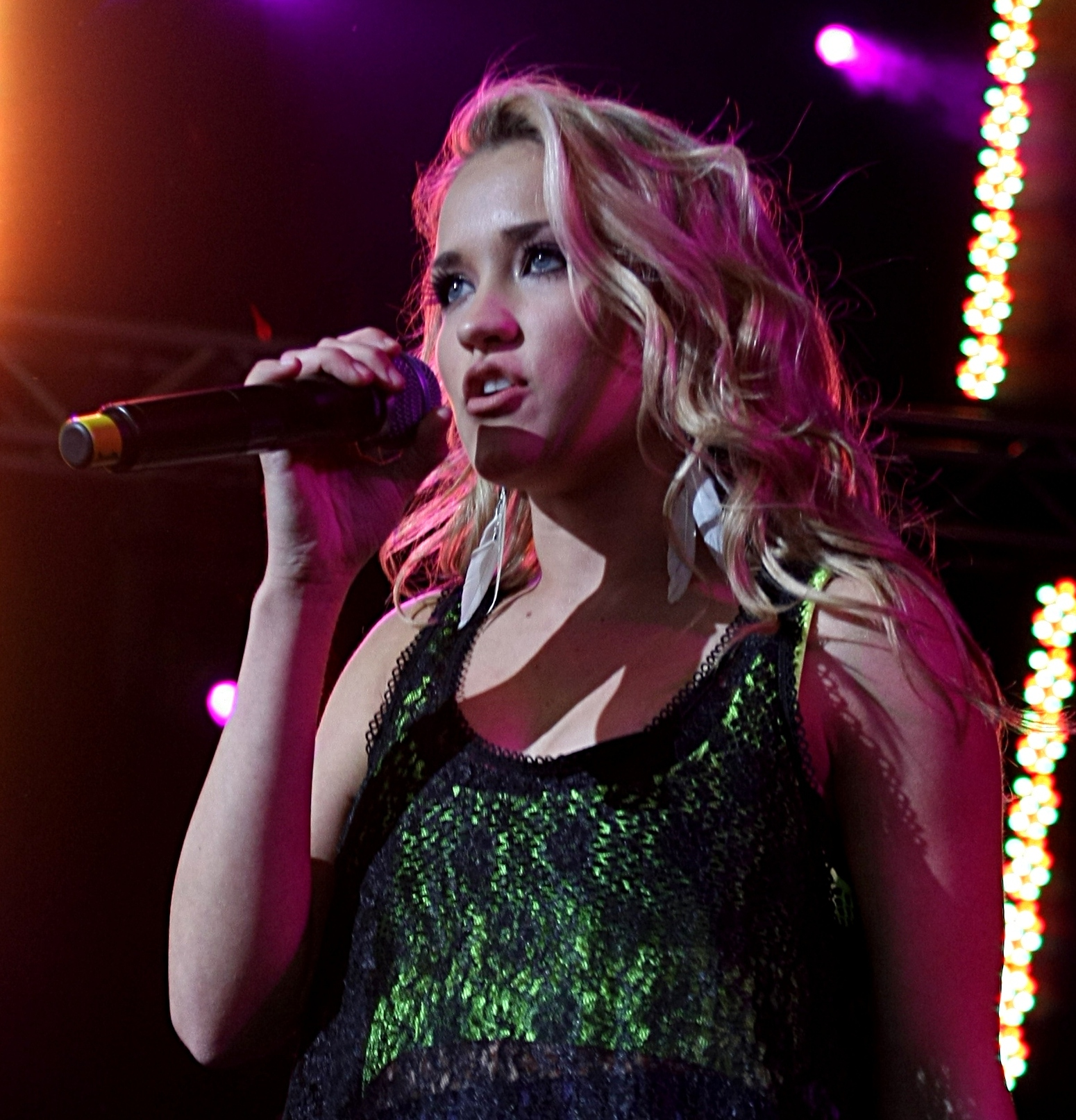
Osment performing live at a Kiss 108 concert in May 2010

Osment confirmed through her Twitter account that she would be on tour: the Clap Your Hands Tour included nine dates in the United States. On March 24, 2010, Osment confirmed on Good Day New York that her debut album would be released in the summer of 2010. "Let's Be Friends" was released as the album's lead single on June 8, 2010. The single debuted and peaked at No. 24 on the Billboard Japan Hot 100 chart and No. 67 at Germany. In addition, the single became her first to chart on an official US singles chart, when it peaked at No. 31 on the Billboard Hot Dance Club Play chart. In October 5 she released her first album, Fight or Flight, focused on electropop and synthpop. The album peaked at No. 170 at Billboard Top 200 and No. 2 at Top Heatseekers The second single, "Lovesick", was released on February 4, 2011. Due to the strong digital downloads the song received, the song debuted at No. 165 on the UK Singles Chart. During the week of April 17, 2011, the single entered the Top 100 in the UK, reaching a peak of 67 on the chart. The single also became her second to achieve success on the Canadian Hot 100, where it debuted at No. 71, and later rose to a peak of 66.

In October, Osment made her second tour Fight or Flight Tour to promote her first album Fight or Flight. It included concerts in North America, Europe and Latin America. It began on October 30, 2010, in São Paulo, Brazil, and ended on December 8, 2010, in Appleton, Wisconsin. Osment presented at the 2010 MTV Europe Music Awards on November 7 in Madrid, Spain, presenting an award to Justin Bieber for best male artist. In March 2010, Osment lent her voice to the secondary character, Kendall Perkins for the animated series Kick Buttowski: Suburban Daredevil on Disney XD. On May 10, 2011, she released the duet single "Hush" with Josh Ramsay of Marianas Trench, and the song peaked at No. 90 in Canada. In 2011, Osment starred in the ABC Family movie about a young woman who suffers cyberbullying, called Cyberbully, released on July 17, 2011. ABC worked with Seventeen to make the film with the hope that it would help eliminate Internet harassment. It was filmed in Montreal and was released on DVD on February 7, 2012. The film received generally positive reviews and had 3.4 million viewers on its premiere. To promote the film, she released her single, "Drift".

=== 2013–2021: Cleaners, Young & Hungry, and return to music as Bluebiird ===
In 2013, Osment starred in the TV series Cleaners, which in 2014 was announced for a second season. Osment had a cameo in Life with Boys, and appeared in four episodes of Family Guy. She reprised her voice role as Pep for the third Beverly Hills Chihuahua film, which was released on DVD September 18, 2012, and was one of her last works at Disney. Osment confirmed through her official Facebook account that she had left her label Wind-Up Records and has launched an independent project with airs folk, indie and country in a band called Ramshackle, consisting of Osment and her friend Dan Schechter, performing in bars such as the Troubadour and at the Spiedie Fest 2013, performing covers of The Beatles, R. Kelly and "Lullaby". In 2013, Osment made a special participation in the episode "Bazinga! That's From a TV Show" for the comedy series Two and a Half Men where she played the role of Ashley. Osment starred in the short film called Seasick Sailor led by Devon Bostick and Torre Catalano. The film has been presented in some film festivals and won the award for Best Narrative Short at the Los Angeles Film Festival.

Osment also participated in the drama, Kiss Me, directed by Jeff Probst in which she starred opposite Irish actress Sarah Bolger. In October, Osment filmed a new movie No Way Jose. In October 2013, the third movie in the Nightmare franchise started filming, called A Daughter's Nightmare, which premiered on Lifetime in 2014. Osment recorded the song In Case Of Fire for the soundtrack of the film. Osment also finished recording the second season of the web series Cleaners.

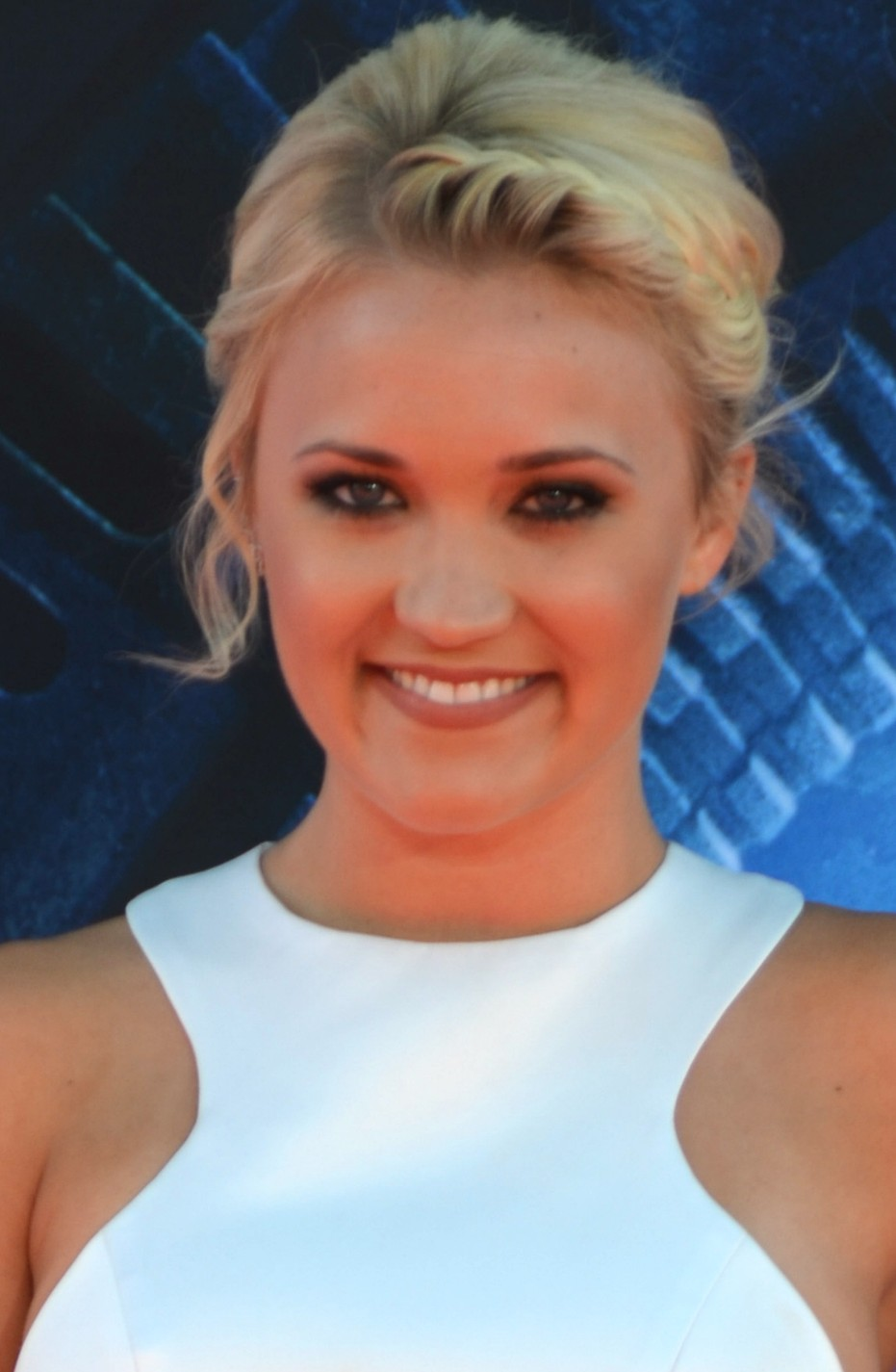
Osment at the premiere of Guardians of the Galaxy, 2014

In 2014, she debuted as the lead role in the new ABC Family TV series Young & Hungry, produced by Ashley Tisdale. Osment plays Gabi, a feisty young blogger hired as the personal chef to a young San Francisco tech entrepreneur. The pilot episode, which aired on June 25, 2014, garnered 1.08 million views in the U.S.

Osment appeared in the 2015 movie Love Is All You Need? The film, which also stars Briana Evigan, is an independent drama set in a world where being gay is normal and heterosexual people are intimidated. In August 2015, Osment was booked for a recurring role on the third season of the CBS series Mom. She played Jodi, a girl living on the street who was a drug addict; Christy (Anna Faris) and Bonnie (Allison Janney) helped her stay clean and find a job. The third season premiered on November 5, 2015. But Jodi died from a drug overdose in midseason, a decision made with the creation of the character.

Osment confirmed through her official Facebook page, that on March 8, 2019, International Women's Day, she released her first single as a new musical alias Bluebiird, "Black Coffee Morning", followed by "Sailor" on April 26 and "Good Girl" on June 21, respectively. She released an EP under the alias titled When I Loved You on September 27.

Also in 2018, she was cast in a recurring role as Theresa, an acting student, in The Kominsky Method. The series ran for three seasons, and Osment received two nominations for a Screen Actors Guild Award for Outstanding Performance by an Ensemble in a Comedy Series. The third and final season premiered on May 28, 2021. On October 8, 2021, Osment's new sitcom, Pretty Smart premiered on Netflix.

=== 2022–present: Young Sheldon and Georgie & Mandy's First Marriage ===
In 2022, she joined the cast of Young Sheldon as Mandy McAllister, the television "weather girl" who becomes Georgie's love interest and eventually pregnant with his child. She was promoted to a series regular starting with the sixth season.

In 2023, Osment portrayed Magan Fieramusca in the Lifetime film Stolen Baby: The Murder of Heidi Broussard as part of its series of "Ripped from the Headlines" feature films; the movie detailed the titular crimes done by Osment's character.

In January 2024, it was announced that a spin-off series of Young Sheldon called Georgie & Mandy's First Marriage, focused on Georgie Cooper and Mandy McAllister and starring Osment and Montana Jordan, was slated for the 2024–25 season on CBS. The series premiered on October 17, 2024.

== Other ventures ==
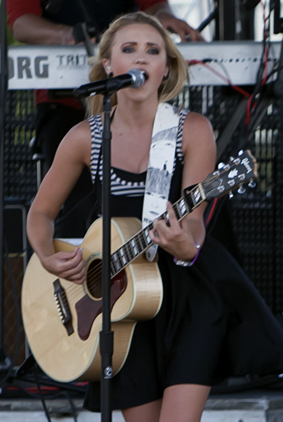
Osment singing at the New Jersey Festival of Ballooning on July 24, 2010

In 2007, Osment signed a deal to appear in a nationwide campaign called "Smart Girls Rock" by the New York-based denim brand Vanilla Star. "It's a new line for girls, the clothes are really denim and girly with an edge of punk." She promoted her song "I Don't Think About It" with the release of the campaign and commercial. Late that summer, Disney released a Hannah Montana clothing collection. Osment helped to design some of the pieces from the collection. Her image was used in some of these pieces, as well as other Hannah Montana merchandise (such as dolls and DVDs).

== Philanthropy ==
Osment signed with CosmoGIRL! shirts for the president of an online charity auction. In 2007, Osment designed a line of shirts for 2lovecollection.com, whose proceeds went to the Make-A-Wish Foundation and St. Jude Children's Research Hospital.

In early 2008, Osment participated in the "Disney Channel Earth Day", where she and other Disney stars met with TreePeople to teach children how to care for the environment with small changes in their homes and neighborhoods. Osment was also part of the green project, Disney's Friends for Change, an initiative for the environment created in 2009. Twenty-nine Disney stars featured in a year-long TV and radio campaign encouraging young fans to take action on environmental issues in four key areas: climate, waste, water, and habitat. Children had the opportunity to choose how Disney will invest one million dollars in various environmental programs.

Osment is an ambassador for STOMP Out Bullying, an anti-bullying organization for children. She was voted the U.G.L.Y. (Unique Gifted Lovable You) celebrity of 2011 at the seventh annual Celebrity of the Year Award for her performance in Cyberbully.

== Personal life ==
From 2013 to 2015, Osment dated actor Jimmy Tatro. From 2016 to early 2021, Osment was in a relationship with Jim Gilbert, a therapist.

In 2021, Osment began a relationship with Jack Anthony. They announced their engagement in June 2023. They married in a private ceremony in October 2024. She filed for divorce five months later in March 2025. The divorce was uncontested and was settled and completed on March 10, 2025, approximately three days after the filing.

== Filmography ==
=== Film ===
Year	Title	Role	Notes	Ref.
1999	The Secret Life of Girls	Miranda Aiken		
2002	Spy Kids 2: The Island of Lost Dreams	Gerti Giggles		
2003	Spy Kids 3-D: Game Over	Gerti Giggles		
2005	Lilo & Stitch 2: Stitch Has a Glitch	Additional Voices (voice)	Direct to video film	
2007	The Haunting Hour: Don't Think About It	Cassie Keller	Direct to video film	
2008	Soccer Mom	Becca Handler	Direct to video film	
2008	Surviving Sid	Start Girl Claire (voice)		
2009	Hannah Montana: The Movie	Lilly Truscott		
2011	Cyberbully	Taylor Hillridge	Television Film	
2011	Beverly Hills Chihuahua 2	Pep Cortez (voice)	Direct to video film	
2012	Beverly Hills Chihuahua 3: Viva la Fiesta!	Pep Cortez (voice)	Direct to video film	
2013	From Up on Poppy Hill	Nobuko Yokoyama (voice)		
2013	Seasick Sailor	Beck	Short film	
2014	Kiss Me	Shelby		
2015	No Way Jose	Summer Stern		
2016	Love Is All You Need?	Kelly Williams		
2018	Tea Time with Mr. Patterson	Stacey	Short film	

=== Television ===
Year	Title	Role	Notes
1999	Sarah, Plain and Tall: Winter's End	Cassie Witting	Television film
1999	3rd Rock from the Sun	Dahlia	Episode: "Dick, Who's Coming to Dinner"
2000	Touched by an Angel	Alyssa Sullivan	Episode: "With God as My Witness"
2001	Friends	Lelani Mayolanofavich	Episode: "The One with the Halloween Party"
2002	Total Access 24/7	Herself	Episode: "Spy Kids 2"
2006–2011	Hannah Montana	Lilly Truscott/Lola Luftnagle	Main role
2006–2008	Disney Channel Games	Herself	Recurring role (seasons 1 & 2)
2006	Holidaze: The Christmas That Almost Didn't Happen	Trick	Television special; Voice role
2007	Shorty McShorts' Shorts	Tall Skunk Girl, Kelly	2 episodes; Voice role
2009	Dadnapped	Melissa Morris	Television film
2009	The Suite Life on Deck	Lilly Truscott/Lola Luftnagle	Episode: "Double-Crossed"
2010	Jonas	Herself	Episode: "Boat Trip"
2010–2012	Kick Buttowski: Suburban Daredevil	Kendall Perkins	Recurring voice role
2011	Cyberbully	Taylor Hillridge	Television film
2012	Life with Boys	Herself	Episode: "Double Trouble with Boys"
2012–2017; 2019–2021	Family Guy	Ruth Cochamer	Recurring voice role (seasons 4–6, 9–20)
2013	Two and a Half Men	Ashley	Episode: "Bazinga! That's From a TV Show"
2013–2014	Cleaners	Roxie	Main role
2014	Rainbow Brite	Rainbow Brite	Main voice role
2014	A Daughter's Nightmare	Ariel Morgan	Television film
2014–2018	Young & Hungry	Gabi Diamond	Main role
2015–2016	Mom	Jodi Hubbard	Recurring role
2018–2021	The Kominsky Method	Theresa	Recurring role
2018	25	Kate	Episode: "Pilot"
2018	Christmas Wonderland	Heidi Nelson	Television film and also executive producer
2019	The Masked Singer	Herself	Episode: "Return of the Masks: Group C"
2019–2020	Almost Family	Roxy Doyle	Main role
2021	Pretty Smart	Chelsea	Main role
2021	A Very Merry Bridesmaid	Leah Taylor	Television film
2022–2024	Young Sheldon	Amanda "Mandy" McAllister	Recurring role (season 5); main role (season 6 & 7)
2022	Dead End: Paranormal Park	Courtney	Main voice role
2023	Stolen Baby: The Murder of Heidi Broussard	Magan Fieramusca	Television film
2024–present	Georgie & Mandy's First Marriage	Amanda "Mandy" McAllister	Main role

=== Video games ===
Year	Title	Role	Notes
2012	Family Guy: Back to the Multiverse	Additional voices	

== Discography ==
Studio albums

- Fight or Flight (2010)

Extended plays

- All the Right Wrongs (2009)
- When I Loved You (as Bluebiird) (2019)

== Tours ==
Headlining

- Clap Your Hands Tour (2010)
- Fight or Flight Tour (2010)

== Awards and nominations ==
Year	Association	Category	Work	Result	Ref.
2000	Young Artist Awards	Best Performance in a TV Movie or Pilot – Young Actress Age Ten or Under	Sarah, Plain and Tall: Winter's End	Nominated	
2003	Young Artist Awards	Best Performance In A Feature Film – Young Actress Age Ten or Younger	Spy Kids 2: Island of Lost Dreams	Nominated	
2004	Young Artist Awards	Best Young Ensemble In A Feature Film (shared with ensemble)	Spy Kids 3-D: Game Over	Nominated	
2007	Young Artist Awards	Best Performance In A TV Series (Comedy or Drama) – Supporting Young Actress	Hannah Montana	Nominated	
2008	Young Artist Awards	Best Young Ensemble Performance In A TV Series (shared with ensemble)	Hannah Montana	Nominated	
2008	Young Artist Awards	Best Performance In A TV Movie, Miniseries or Special – Leading Young Actress	The Haunting Hour: Don't Think About It	Nominated	
2009	Young Artist Awards	Best Performance In A TV Series (Comedy or Drama) – Supporting Young Actress	Hannah Montana	Nominated	
2009	Teen Choice Awards	Choice Movie: Fresh Face Female	Hannah Montana: The Movie	Nominated	
2009	Teen Choice Awards	Choice TV Sidekick	Hannah Montana	Won	
2010	People's Choice Awards	Favorite Breakout Movie Actress	Herself	Nominated	
2010	Bravo Otto Awards	Shooting Star	Herself	Won	
2012	Prism Awards	Best Performance In A TV Movie or Miniseries	Cyberbully	Won	
2013	Canadian Screen Awards	Best Performance by an Actress in a Leading Role in a Dramatic Program or Mini-Series	Cyberbully	Won	
2014	Teen Choice Awards	Choice Summer TV Star – Female	Young & Hungry	Nominated	
2015	Teen Choice Awards	Choice TV Actress: Comedy	Young & Hungry	Nominated	
2016	Teen Choice Awards	Choice Summer TV Star – Female	Young & Hungry	Nominated	
2019	Screen Actors Guild Awards	Outstanding Performance by an Ensemble in a Comedy Series (shared with ensemble)	The Kominsky Method	Nominated	
2019	Sunny Side Up Film Festival Award	Best Supporting Actress	Tea Time with Mr. Patterson	Won	
2021	Screen Actors Guild Awards	Outstanding Performance by an Ensemble in a Comedy Series (shared with ensemble)	The Kominsky Method	Nominated	
