= Let's Be Friends (Emily Osment song) =

Single by Emily Osment

from the album Fight or Flight
- Released: June 8, 2010
- Genre: Dance-pop; electropop
- Length: 3:02
- Label: Wind-up
- Songwriters: Emily Osment; Toby Gad; Mandi Perkins
- Producer: Gad

Emily Osment singles chronology
"You Are the Only One" (2009)	"Let's Be Friends" (2010)	"Lovesick" (2011)

Music video
- "Let's Be Friends" on YouTube

"Let's Be Friends" is a song recorded by American actress and singer Emily Osment for her debut studio album, Fight or Flight (2010). It was released through Wind-up Records on June 8, 2010, as the lead single from the album. The electropop song was written by Osment, Mandi Perkins and its producer Toby Gad, serving as a departure from Osment's early pop rock music.

== Background ==
"Let's Be Friends" is a song about Osment's "desire to get busy with a stranger." It originally premiered one day before its release on JSYK.com, and Osment spoke with them about the release of the song.

"I am beyond excited for the release of my new single 'Let's Be Friends'. "I have been working endlessly to make sure this song is like nothing that you have heard from me yet. I hope you are ready to dance, because I am ready to make you!"

== Composition ==
"Let's Be Friends" was written by Emily Osment and Mandi Perkins while production was handled by Toby Gad who also co-wrote the song. The track runs at 109 BPM and is in the key of E minor. Musically, the track has been described as a dance-pop and electropop song. The track has been noted for its resemblance to American singer Britney Spears’ song “Radar” from her fifth studio album Blackout (2007).

== Reception ==
"Let's Be Friends" was met with generally positive reviews from music critics. Mike Wass of Idolator praised the song for its "scorching chorus," as well as complimenting Gad's production work on the track. He also called the track, "An underrated, '00s pop gem." JSYK.com stated that the song, "is a flirtatious dance track with serious attitude that might surprise fans of Emily's infectious pop songs... her confident lyrics and sassy new sound creates a winning combination."

== Chart performance ==
"Let's Be Friends" debuted at number 79 on the Japan Hot 100. The song later peaked at number 24 on the chart. In Germany, the song debut at number 84, and later rose to a peak of 67. In addition, the single peaked at number 31 on the Billboard Dance Club Songs chart lasting 10 weeks.

== Music video ==
The music video for the song premiered on August 23, 2010 and was directed by Luga Podesta.

== Track listing ==
Digital download
No.	Title	Length
1.	"Let's Be Friends"	3:02

International digital download
No.	Title	Length
1.	"Let's Be Friends"	3:02
2.	"Let's Be Friends" (Prince Villiam Remix)	4:01
3.	"Let's Be Friends" (COLTMAN Remix)	5:28

The Remixes
No.	Title	Length
1.	"Let's Be Friends" (Riddler Radio)	3:39
2.	"Let's Be Friends" (Steve Porter Radio)	3:56
3.	"Let's Be Friends" (Steve Porter Club)	5:38
4.	"Let's Be Friends" (Riddler Extended)	7:21
5.	"Let's Be Friends" (Riddler Mixshow)	5:54

== Charts ==
Chart performance for "Let's Be Friends"
Chart (2010–11)	Peak position
Czech Republic Airplay (ČNS IFPI)	70
Germany (GfK)	67
Japan (Japan Hot 100)	24
South Korea (International Chart) (Gaon Chart)	102
US Dance Club Songs (Billboard)	31
