= All the Way Up (Emily Osment song) =

Single by Emily Osment

from the album All the Right Wrongs
- Released: August 25, 2009
- Recorded: 2009
- Genre: Pop rock
- Length: 3:12
- Label: Wind-up
- Songwriters: Emily Osment; Anthony Fagenson; James Maxwell Collins

Emily Osment singles chronology
"If I Didn't Have You" (2007)	"All the Way Up" (2009)	"You Are the Only One" (2010)

"All the Way Up" is the debut single by American actress and singer Emily Osment, recorded for her debut extended play (EP), All the Right Wrongs (2009). It was released through Wind-up Records on August 25, 2009 as the lead single from the EP. The song was co-written by Osment and Anthony Fagenson, and was produced by James Maxwell Collins. Lyrically, Osment stated she wanted the song to be about "breaking out" and that "a lot of kids can relate to that".

"All the Way Up" failed to garner much attention on the music charts, but it did manage to enter the charts in a few international territories, as well as becoming a hit on Radio Disney.

== Background ==
"All the Way Up" was co-written by Osment, along with James Maxwell Collins and Anthony Fagenson. The song was recorded by Osment while on the set of the Disney Channel sitcom Hannah Montana. She stated during an interview that the song was finished after nearly 3 months of working on it. The single was debuted on Radio Disney on August 25, 2009, and was released for radio airplay the following day. Originally, "You Are the Only One" was intended to be released as the lead single. However, Osment pushed for the release of "All the Way Up", and eventually her record label agreed to release it as her debut single.

== Composition ==
"All the Way Up" has an emphasis mainly on the bass and drums, but the guitar is also dominant in the song. Osment has listed Alanis Morissette as one of the main inspirations for the single, and EP in general. She stated that Morissette's album Jagged Little Pill was the main influence for her musical career, and that she had incorporated themes from the EP into her own. When being interviewed about the single, Osment stated:

“That song was written about a year ago and I recorded the final recording three or four months ago. I wrote it with Tony Fagenson and Max Collins.... When we first wrote it we wanted to write a song about breaking out... A lot of kids can connect with that because we all have strange habits.

The lyrics to "All the Way Up" were co-written by Osment, with all of her teenage fans in mind. It speaks of wanting to break out, and just be who you want to be. The main example of this theme is shown in the chorus of the single, when Osment sings the line, "All the way up, all the way down. Never look back, it's time to break out!" "All the Way Up" is constructed with the common verse-chorus pattern.

== Reception ==
=== Critical reception ===
Critical response to "All the Way Up" was generally mixed. Andrew Leahy, of AllMusic, stated that "After flirting with pop and country on her early recordings, Emily Osment underwent a rock & roll makeover for her debut EP, All the Right Wrongs." They also went on to state that "Despite some fairly catchy songs, [Osment] never quite shakes [herself] free of the Disney machine: [she] embraces Auto-Tune, emphasizes overly polished production, and generally whittles away at the sharp teeth these tunes might've otherwise had. In their review of the album, AbsolutePunk stated "All The Way Up, though upbeat, contains mundane lyrics (“Its my life, it’s a riot/ Come on, baby, you can’t deny it”), and boring pop melodies." Some called the song childish, stating that Osment tries to come across as "fierce", but just falls flat in the end.

Others praised the single, calling it a magnificent start to her career. In their review of the single, sodahead.com said the song was their favorite on the album. They went on to say that the song was very "fun", and makes you "wanna get up and dance!"

=== Chart performance ===
"All the Way Up" received little promotion and failed to make a major impact in most musical charts worldwide. The song also managed to chart on the Canadian Hot 100, debuting at number 77 on the chart the week of its release. After rising up one spot to 76 the following week, it then fell to 94, before completely falling off the chart the following week. The music video peaked at number three on Yahoo! Video.

== Music video ==
=== Concept ===
The official music video for "All the Way Up" was directed by Roman White. It was filmed in July 2009, and was released on August 25, 2009. American band Push Play appear in the video for the song, as Osment's backing band. This is a reference to the fact that Osment had just starred in the music video for their single "Midnight Romeo", which was also directed by White. The video features Osment and Push Play performing the song in their apartment, while the people in the surrounding apartments listen in. Eventually, the music becomes so loud that the building begins to fall apart. When asked about the concept of the video, Osment said: "The video was so fun, Push Play plays my band [...] We're buddies," [...] "It was really fun we shot it in a mock apartment where you could see what's going on in every room [...] I'm playing music upstairs and you can see how it's affecting all the rooms below."

== Promotion ==
In an attempt to promote the single, Osment did many interviews with television networks and radio shows. She also participated in several Q&A sessions with fans, as well as doing interviews on many blog websites. Unlike Osment's previous songs (the ones recorded for soundtracks on Disney), "All the Way Up" didn't receive any promotion from Disney Channel, due to Osment's label being Wind-up Records, instead of Hollywood. Osment made an appearance on popular daytime talk show The View, where she was interviewed about her new album and single and performed the single live. Osment also performed the single on her "Halloween Bash", as well as on her "Clap Your Hands" tour. She also performed a set of songs on the local television station Orange Lounge. On October 29, the song was performed on the Canadian music program MuchOnDemand. The following morning, the single was performed on the Canadian morning talk show Breakfast Television.

== Track listing ==
1. "All the Way Up" - 3:12 (album version)
2. "All the Way Up" - 3:10 (Radio Edit)

== Charts ==
Chart performance for "All the Way Up"
Chart (2009–10)	Peak position
Australia Hitseekers (ARIA)	10
Canada Hot 100 (Billboard)	76
South Korea (International Chart) (Gaon Chart)	156
