= Dadnapped =

2009 television film

- Film poster
- Written by: Alan Silberberg
- Directed by: Paul Hoen
- Starring: Emily Osment; David Henrie; Jason Earles; Jonathan Keltz; Moises Arias; Denzel Whitaker; Charles Halford; Phill Lewis; George Newbern
- Theme music composer: Adam Cohen
- Country of origin: United States
- Original language: English

Production
- Producers: Don Schain; Douglas Sloan
- Cinematography: David A. Makin
- Editor: Terry Stokes
- Running time: 90 minutes
- Production company: Salty Pictures
- Budget: $4.5 million

Original release
- Network: Disney Channel
- Release: February 16, 2009

Dadnapped is a 2009 American crime comedy film released as a Disney Channel Original Movie. It premiered February 16, 2009. Starring actors from Disney Channel Original Series, the movie had 4.6 million viewers for its premiere. Although the story centers on a hostage situation, the kidnappers are inept and the film "practically oozes kid-pleasing content".

== Plot ==
Melissa Morris desperately tries to gain more attention from her always preoccupied father, Neal, a best-selling author. Melissa lives in the shadow of Tripp Zoome, the adventurous and clever hero from her father's popular spy novels. Before a long overdue father-daughter vacation, her father gets kidnapped by obsessive fans: Wheeze with his friend, Sheldon and his younger brother, Andre.

However, the tables turn when she has to team up with them to find and rescue him from Merv and his hired goons, Maurice and Skunk. It turns out Merv is just using Skunk and Maurice as part of a plan to get Neal to write one final book and get rich off it, and uses his daughter as a hostage by threatening to imprison Skunk and Maurice if they do not comply. Wheeze, Andre and Sheldon get all of the Trip Zoome fans in town to gather together to rescue Melissa and Neal and they attack when Melissa manages to signal them.

The fans attack Merv, Maurice and Skunk and they try to run but are stopped by more fans. Merv sneaks out with Neal while Skunk and Maurice go after Melissa who escapes. Melissa defeats them and ties them up. Merv nearly gets away, but Sheldon, who had been trying to find where everyone went, spots him and alerts everyone else, causing both Neal and Merv to be violently sprayed with water and juice. Neal is rescued, but Merv tries to get away.

As he runs, pursued by his tormentors, Maurice and Skunk, still tied up, come out and see this and, regretting what they've done, use the floss they're bound in to trip Merv, knocking him down and causing him to land face-first into a pile of trash. The police show up and arrest Merv, Maurice and Skunk while Neal thanks his fans. Wheeze gives his phone number to Melissa before she and her father leave on their long-overdue vacation.

== Cast ==
- Emily Osment as Melissa Morris
- David Henrie as "Wheeze"
- Jason Earles as Merv Kilbo
- Jonathan Keltz as Tripp Zoome
- Moisés Arias as Andre
- Denzel Whitaker as Sheldon
- Charles Halford as "Skunk"
- Phill Lewis as Maurice Legarche
- George Newbern as Neal Morris
- Jennifer Stone as Debbie (voice)
- Liz Lustig as Extra #1

== Reception ==
Its premiere attracted 4.6 million viewers, outshining Nickelodeon's movie, Spectacular!, which premiered at the same time, by 39%.

Despite its commercial success and positive fan response, it was negatively received by critics. David Nusair called the movie (along with Hatching Pete) "typically underwhelming Disney Channel fare."

== Adaptations ==
Dadnapped: Junior Novel is a book based on the movie, which was due to be released September 30, 2008 in the United States and October 21, 2008, in the UK, but the release date was changed to February 2009 to coincide with the movie's release.
