= Kiss Me (2014 film) =

- Directed by: Jeff Probst
- Written by: Elizabeth Sarnoff
- Produced by: Jeff Probst; Katty Wallin-Sandalis; Jhon J. Kelly
- Starring: Sarah Bolger; Emily Osment; Missi Pyle; Jenna Fischer; John Corbett
- Cinematography: John Guleserian
- Edited by: Eric Potter
- Music by: BC Smith
- Production companies: MysticArt Pictures; Great Adventure Productions
- Distributed by: Studio Universal
- Release date: July 5, 2014
- Country: United States
- Language: English

Kiss Me is a 2014 American romantic drama film directed by Jeff Probst based on a screenplay by Elizabeth Sarnoff. The film stars Sarah Bolger and Emily Osment.

== Plot ==
Zoe, a 15-year-old teenager, is taken to the doctor for back pain. She has been diagnosed with scoliosis, which requires her to wear a back brace for several years until she stops growing. As she is concerned about being marginalized in school, she is dissatisfied with her mother for insisting on the use of the brace. Her father is dissatisfied that she has inherited the condition from him.

Noticing a slightly older girl named Shelby in the neighborhood, Zoe introduces herself, offering her friendship. Zoe works a few hours a week babysitting for married couple Chance and Vera. Being a photographer, Chance insists that Zoe could become a model. Having developed a crush on Chance, Zoe impulsively kisses him one evening as he's dropping her off at home.

Meanwhile, Shelby has accepted Zoe's friendship. Shelby shares with Zoe the difficulties she faces in her home life, as Shelby's father is an alcoholic who is abusive towards her and her mother. Shelby's parents are also conservative and controlling, insisting she stay at home if she is not working.

As the story progresses, Zoe and Shelby encounter each other at school. One day after school, when Shelby isn't there to go home with her, Zoe goes to her house and sees police cars out front. Later, she learns that Shelby called them out of frustration over her violent father.

Zoe is then unhappy to learn that she was awarded a summer job for the park district, partially due to being considered handicapped. Accepting the new job causes her to stop babysitting during the week. Chance suggests she do a photo shoot that weekend, during which the two end up flirting with each other, and several provocative shots are taken during the shoot.

Despite the emotional and physical hardships Zoe and Shelby experience, their friendship deepens and evolves, leading to significant changes in both of the girls' lives. However, their relationship is challenged when Shelby's mother catches the girls kissing. Shelby's mother becomes upset and forbids her from seeing Zoe.

Meanwhile, Vera becomes suspicious that something happened between Zoe and Chance on the weekend; he photographed her while she and the kids were away. Vera confronts Zoe at her park job to tell Zoe that she's no longer needed as a babysitter.

After three years, Zoe stops needing her back brace, Shelby gets married, and Zoe attends as a guest. Later on, Chance visits Zoe at her work and invites her over to his place while Vera and their children are away on a trip on the weekend with Vera's parents. However, when Chance takes his clothes off, wanting to have sex during her visit, Zoe realizes that she doesn't want to go through with it.

In the concluding scene, Shelby briefly visits Zoe before Zoe departs for college, as Zoe's mother lets Shelby know that Zoe will be leaving. Wishing Zoe luck, both girls promise to keep a bit of each other in their hearts.

== Cast ==
- Emily Osment as Shelby
- Jenna Fischer as Vera
- Sarah Bolger as Zoe
- John Corbett as Chance
- Missi Pyle as Pam
- Currie Graham as Dr. Craig
- Rita Wilson as Edith
- Jes Macallan as Erica
- Steven Weber as Arthur
- Geoffrey Blake as George
- Emily Bicks as Colleen
- Davenia McFadden as Nurse Sylvie
- Casey J Adler as Evan
- Ralph Votrian as Dr Vollbracht

== Production ==
=== Casting ===
On February 9, 2012, it was confirmed that Jenna Fischer, Rita Wilson, Steven Weber, Davenia McFadden and John Corbett joined the cast. It was also announced that Irish actress Sarah Bolger and Emily Osment were cast in the lead roles.

=== Filming ===
The film was shot in Los Angeles in early February 2012, and was released almost 2 and a half years later on the 5th of July 2014.
