= I Don't Think About It =

Single by Emily Osment
- Released: August 21, 2007
- Recorded: 2007
- Genre: Electropop
- Length: 2:57 (single version); 4:04 (main version)
- Label: Hatchery
- Songwriters: Ilene Angel, Sue Fabisch

Emily Osment singles chronology
"I Don't Think About It" (2007)	"If I Didn't Have You" (2007)

I Don't Think About It is a song performed by Emily Osment for R. L. Stine's The Haunting Hour: Don't Think About It. The song hit #1 on the Radio Disney top 3. Osment also shot an accompanying music video for the song, released in The Haunting Hour: Don't Think About It DVD. The song was written by Ilene Angel and Sue Fabisch.

== Music video ==
The music video shows Osment singing the song in a recording studio. Throughout the video are scenes Osment singing to the song with various animations in the background. Another portion of the video shows clips from the film The Haunting Hour: Don't Think About It. The video also shows various behind the scenes footage. An alternative version of the music video was shown during the end credits of the film that only features Osment singing the song in a recording studio.

== Release history ==
Region	Date	Format	Label
United States	August 27, 2007	CD single, digital download	Hatchery
United Kingdom	August 27, 2007	CD single, digital download	Hatchery
Europe	August 27, 2007	CD single, digital download	Hatchery
