= A Daughter's Nightmare =

2014 television film directed by Vic Sarin

- Movie
- Genre: Drama, Mystery, Thriller
- Written by: Shelley Gillen
- Directed by: Vic Sarin
- Starring: Emily Osment; Gregg Sulkin; Paul Johansson; Victoria Pratt
- Music by: Keith Power
- Country of origin: Canada
- Original language: English

Production
- Producers: John Bolton; Larry Gershman; Tina Pehme; Kim Roberts; Meyer Shwarzstein; Ian R. Smith
- Cinematography: Vic Sarin
- Editor: Austin Andrews
- Running time: 87 minutes
- Production company: Sepia Films

Original release
- Network: Lifetime
- Release: May 3, 2014

A Daughter's Nightmare is a 2014 American TV thriller and suspense film starring Emily Osment, Gregg Sulkin, Paul Johansson and Victoria Pratt. It was directed by Vic Sarin and it was released in the United States on May 3, 2014, on Lifetime network. This movie was filmed in Kelowna, British Columbia, Canada. The director of this film, Vic Sarin, made eight films in the Okanagan region since he first came to Kelowna in 2012 to make the Lifetime TV thriller, A Mother's Nightmare.

== Plot ==
After the death of her father, Ariel Morgan returns to college, where she meets fellow student Ben Woods. The next weekend, Ben and his father Adam offer Ariel a ride home. During the ride, Ariel explains that her mother plans to attend a grief group. Adam attends the group and introduces himself to Ariel's mother Dana, explaining that his wife died eight months ago.

One afternoon, Adam approaches Dana's house with his dog and two cups of coffee. Ariel takes one of the coffees as Dana invites Adam in. Ariel suddenly feels sick and asks her mother to drive her back to college.

Adam picks up Dana for a grief group meeting. En route, he convinces her to join him for dinner instead of going to group. The next morning, Dana wakes up in her own bedroom. Adam arrives at the house with homemade breakfast, which Ariel's uncle Cameron eats.

Adam meets Ariel at school and gives her two tickets for the Dixie Chicks concert that night so that Ariel can take Dana out for a break. Ariel goes to the concert; however, Ben shows up and explains that Dana told him to use her ticket. Meanwhile, Adam goes to Dana's house with flowers. The next morning, Dana finds herself naked in bed, feeling like she was drugged.

A home cleaning service worker finds Cameron dead in his house. Ariel and Dana are talking about Cameron's death when Dana suddenly collapses. Ariel hurries to call an ambulance, but Adam tells Ariel that Dana does not need an ambulance. Dana explains that Adam is a nurse who knows what he is doing.

The next morning, Adam takes breakfast to Dana in bed. She asks him what has he done to her and why she can't walk. Adam ignores her questions and tells her that he had found a great place to stay in. He writes a note for Ariel under Dana's name, explaining that she is going away with Adam for a while.

When Ben's eye starts bleeding, Ariel takes him to the hospital. Tests reveal a large dose of ethambutol in his blood, explaining that it is an antibiotic to treat tuberculosis. Ben deduces that Adam must be drugging him and Dana. She and Ben rush to Dana's house, then call the police when Dana is not there. The police leave when they see the forged note.

Ariel and Ben track down Adam and rescue Dana. Adam is convicted of kidnapping and sent to prison.

== Setting ==
The story of this film takes place in the fictional town of "Ridgewood"; Ridgewood was also the setting of the Lifetime movies A Mother's Nightmare and A Wife's Nightmare.

== Cast ==
- Emily Osment as Ariel Morgan
- Gregg Sulkin as Ben Woods
- Paul Johansson as Adam Smith
- Victoria Pratt as Dana Morgan
- Richard Karn as Cameron "Cam" Morgan
- Jaden Rain as Brooks
- Eric Breker as Vic
- Gabriela Zimmerman as Maria
- Peter Benson as Dr. Logie
- Alex Zahara as Dr. Shwarzstein

== Production ==
Filming for the movie began in 2013 in Kelowna, Canada because of the California-like scenery and the lower costs.
