= Hush (Emily Osment and Josh Ramsay song) =

Single by Emily Osment and Josh Ramsay
- Released: May 10, 2011
- Recorded: 2011
- Genre: Synthpop
- Length: 3:40
- Label: Wind-Up Records
- Songwriters: Emily Osment, Josh Ramsay
- Producers: Emily Osment, Josh Ramsay

Emily Osment singles chronology
"Lovesick" (2010)	"Hush" (2011)	"Drift" (2011)

Josh Ramsay singles chronology
"Sour Candy" (2009)	"Hush" (2011)	"Hit Me Up" (2011)

"Hush" is a song written by American singer Emily Osment and Canadian singer Josh Ramsay. They decided to collaborate when Osment went on a trip to Canada to film a movie, and met Ramsay. They immediately hit it off, and decided to write a song together. It officially premiered on Much Music on April 26, 2011. The song was sent to Canadian radio on May 10, 2011, and released to Canada's iTunes Store on the same day. Osment confirmed on her official Twitter that there will be a music video for the song to be released in September. The music video never materialized and the song has only been released exclusively in Canada.

== Track listing ==
1. "Hush"

== Charts ==
Chart (2011)	Peak position
Canada Hot 100 (Billboard)	90

== Release history ==
Region	Date	Format
Canada	May 10, 2011	Digital download
