= Cyberbully (2011 film) =

2011 television film directed by Charles Binamé

- Promotional poster
- Written by: Teena Booth
- Directed by: Charles Binamé
- Starring: Emily Osment; Kay Panabaker; Kelly Rowan
- Theme music composer: James Gelfand
- Countries of origin: United States; Canada
- Original language: English

Production
- Producer: Jesse Prupas
- Editor: Simon Webb
- Running time: 87 minutes

Original release
- Network: ABC Family
- Release: July 17, 2011

Cyberbully (stylized as cyberbu//y) is a teen drama television film that premiered on ABC Family (now Freeform) on July 17, 2011. The channel collaborated with Seventeen magazine to make the film, stating that they hoped it would "delete digital drama" in a press release. The film tells the story of a teenage girl who is bullied online. The film was released on DVD on February 7, 2012.

== Plot ==
Taylor Hillridge is a teenage girl living in Indiana with her single mother Kris and younger brother Eric. For her 17th birthday, Kris gifts Taylor a laptop. Taylor is thrilled at the prospect of being able to use the internet without the constant supervision of her mother. Meanwhile, Taylor's crush, Scott, asks her to an upcoming school dance, to which she accepts. While her friend Cheyenne Mortenson is happy for her, their other friend Samantha Caldone is apprehensive of Scott due to a previous bad experience dating his friend.

When Taylor refuses to let Eric use her laptop, he vengefully hacks her account on a social media site called Cliquesters and posts a sexually explicit message. Taylor also meets a boy named James on the site whom she is initially interested in, but he posts a status dishonestly asserting that he had sex with Taylor and that she gave him gonorrhea. These incidents lead Taylor to become the victim of bullying by her peers both online and at school, the main instigator of which being popular student Lindsay Fordyce. Her newfound reputation as a "whore" leads her friends to begin distancing themselves from her, as well as Scott uninviting her to the dance.

Overcome with depression, Taylor posts a video on Cliquesters alluding to suicidal ideation. After viewing the video, Samantha races to Taylor's house and finds her trying to commit suicide by overdosing with pills. She is stopped when first responders and Kris arrive, and is subsequently sent to a hospital. Learning of the severity of the harassment Taylor received, Kris confronts the school system and state legislation to prevent others from experiencing cyberbullying as well. At her mother's behest, Taylor attends a support group for fellow victims of cyberbullying. Also in attendance is Caleb, a gay classmate of hers who is targeted for his sexuality. Despite her initial reluctance, Taylor finds the sessions largely helpful.

Samantha later guiltily confesses to Taylor that she was the one who created the "James" profile in an attempt to protect Taylor from Scott, much to Taylor's despair. When word spreads through the school of this, Samantha becomes a victim of cyberbullying herself. Taylor suggests that Samantha begin attending the support group as well, and the girls rekindle their friendship.

Upon returning to school, Taylor and Samantha are harassed by Lindsay in the cafeteria. Samantha urges Taylor to ignore Linday's comments, but Taylor refuses, finally reprimanding Lindsay for her cruel behavior in front of the rest of the student body. Other students speak up to voice their own contempt towards Lindsay, and celebrate as she storms off in humiliation. Meanwhile, the state legislature passes a bill criminalizing cyberbullying, which is signed into law in honor of Taylor and all victims of bullying.

== Cast ==
- Emily Osment as Taylor Hillridge, a 17-year-old girl who gets her own laptop computer for her birthday
- Kay Panabaker as Samantha Caldone, Taylor's best friend
- Kelly Rowan as Kris Hillridge, Taylor's mother. She divorced her husband three months ago.
- Jon McLaren as Scott Ozsik, Taylor's love interest
- Meaghan Rath as Cheyenne Mortenson, Taylor's other best friend
- Nastassia Markiewicz as Lindsay Fordyce, the main antagonist and the queen bee at Taylor's high school. She constantly harasses people online. Her mother died two years ago.
- Jade Hassouné as Caleb, a gay student at Taylor's school who is also a victim of cyberbullying
- Robert Naylor as Eric Hillridge, Taylor's younger brother

== Reception ==
The film received a generally positive review from Common Sense Media, who gave the film a 4 out of 5 star rating, stating "Cyberbully is a great jumping-off point for talking to teens about the very real dangers that exist online. The movie does a good job of working in most of the hot-button issues related to this topic, including the anonymity that exists online, the legal loopholes that enable cyberbullying, the social pressure on teens to partake in digital relationships, and the emotional devastation that bullying inflicts on its victims and their families."

Cyberbully gained 3.4 million views on its official release date. It was TV's number-one telecast for the 8-10 p.m. time slot and became the week's number-one TV film, and the second most viewed TV film of the 2010 and 2011 season.

== Promotion ==
ABC Family created "badges" that people could add to their profile pictures on sites like Twitter and Facebook; the badge says "[delete] digital drama!".

On July 14, 2011, ABC Family hosted a live event called "The Rally to Delete Digital Drama" in Glendale, California. The rally included appearances from Shay Mitchell, Tyler Blackburn, Daren Kagasoff, Skyler Samuels, Grey Damon, Katie Leclerc, Vanessa Marano, Emily Osment, and more. Emily Osment performed her song "Drift", as well as other songs. There was also an autograph signing and gift giveaways.

== Music ==
Emily Osment released a song called "Drift" which was featured in the film. It was released on July 12, 2011. The film also features "Breathe Me" by Sia. Television spots of the film contain the song "Perfect" by Pink.

== Awards and nominations ==
Award	Year	Category	Recipient	Result	Source
Prism Awards	2012	Best TV Movie or Miniseries	Cyberbully	Nominated	
Prism Awards	2012	Best TV Movie Performance	Emily Osment	Won	
Young Artist Award	2012	Best Performance in a TV Movie, Miniseries or Special – Supporting Young Actor	Robert Naylor	Nominated	
Canadian Society of Cinematographers	2012	Best Cinematography in TV Drama	Pierre Gill	Nominated	
Directors Guild of Canada	2012	Direction - Television Movie/Mini-Series	Charles Binamé	Nominated	
Canadian Screen Award	2013	Best Performance by an Actress in a Featured Supporting Role in a Dramatic Program or Series	Kelly Rowan	Nominated	
Canadian Screen Award	2013	Best Direction in a Dramatic Program or Mini-Series	Charles Binamé	Nominated	
Canadian Screen Award	2013	Best Writing in a Dramatic Program or Mini-Series	Teena Booth	Nominated	
Canadian Screen Award	2013	Best Dramatic Mini-Series or TV Movie	Michael Prupas, Jesse Prupas, Joel S. Rice	Nominated	
Canadian Screen Award	2013	Best Performance by an Actress in a Leading Role in a Dramatic Program or Mini-Series	Emily Osment	Won	

== See also ==
- Megan Meier
