= The Haunting Hour: Don't Think About It =

2007 American children's horror film

R. L. Stine's The Haunting Hour: Don't Think About It
- DVD cover
- Directed by: Alex Zamm
- Written by: Dan Angel; Billy Brown
- Produced by: Bill Siegler
- Starring: Emily Osment; Cody Linley; Brittany Elizabeth Curran; Alex Winzenread; Tobin Bell
- Cinematography: Jacques Haitkin
- Edited by: John Gilbert; Todd C. Ramsay
- Music by: Chris Hajian
- Production companies: Universal Studios Family Productions; The Hatchery; Steeltown Entertainment; Creata Entertainment
- Distributed by: Universal Pictures Home Entertainment
- Release date: September 4, 2007
- Running time: 87 minutes
- Country: United States
- Language: English

R. L. Stine's The Haunting Hour: Don't Think About It is a 2007 American children's horror film based on the children's book of the same name by R. L. Stine. The film was directed by Alex Zamm, written by Dan Angel and Billy Brown, and stars Emily Osment, Cody Linley, Brittany Curran, and Tobin Bell. It was released direct-to-DVD. The plot follows a goth girl named Cassie (Emily Osment) moving into a new town and fascinated by the occult. At a mysterious Halloween store, the store owner (Tobin Bell) insists on selling her an old book. Stuck with her brother Max (Alex Winzenread) on Halloween night, she reads the book to him, despite the book's warnings not to read it out loud or think about its monster. After the monster comes to life and captures Max, Cassie, with help from her friend, must save Max and defeat the monster before their parents return from a Halloween party.

The film was a joint production with Universal Studios Family Productions, The Hatchery, and Steeltown Entertainment. The film was released on DVD by Universal Pictures Home Entertainment on September 4, 2007, and aired on Cartoon Network three days later. The film received mostly positive reviews from media critics upon release.

== Plot ==
Cassie Keller (Emily Osment) is a goth girl who just moved with her family to a new neighborhood and school. She loves to play scary pranks on the popular kids at school and her younger brother Max. Priscilla Wright (Brittany Elizabeth Curran), a bully, is elected Halloween Queen for the school's annual Halloween fair. Cassie retaliates against Priscilla's rude comments against her by putting live cockroaches in the Halloween piñata, which Priscilla is due to break; she is showered with the insects after she breaks it, and is mocked by the student body.

Cassie finds a mysterious Halloween store in an alley. The owner (Tobin Bell) insists on selling her an old book titled The Evil Thing, which contains a warning not to read it aloud or think about "the Evil Thing", a two-headed monster: one head sucks its victim's blood while the other head eats flesh. That night, Cassie ignores the warning and reads the book to Max as revenge for him unplugging her computer.

Cassie's parents leave for a Halloween party and the Evil Thing is brought to life by Max's thoughts. it captures him, Priscilla and a Papa John's Pizza deliveryman. It is up to Cassie and Sean (Cody Linley), a popular boy she likes, to save them. Cassie goes to the store owner for help and discovers that he travels around the world each Halloween, searching for a person who loves to scare people, and tricks them into releasing the Evil Thing by reading the book in order to teach them a lesson. He leaves them with the riddle, "Two heads are better than one; that is the way to get the bloody job done" before his shop disappears. Sean and Cassie deduce that if they get blood from a roast that Cassie's mother made and throw it onto the Evil Thing, one head will attack the other. In doing so, it will devour itself. Meanwhile, the Evil Thing's babies hatch and try to eat the victims. The pair try to lure the monster away but fail. They accidentally drop the blood on the ground near Max, who must now conquer his fears. Encouraged by Cassie, Max tosses the blood onto the Evil Thing, causing its heads to attack each other. The monster eats itself, exploding in a shower of yellow blood, killing itself and its offspring.

Max, Sean and Cassie save Priscilla and pizza deliveryman. Cassie and Sean then burn the book and set aside their thoughts about the Evil Thing. When Cassie's parents come home, however, they find the book in the fireplace. The father mockingly reads it out loud, reviving the Evil Thing once again. The film concludes with Cassie realizing that the Evil Thing has been brought back to life.

== Cast ==
- Emily Osment as Cassie Keller, a goth girl who likes to read and enjoys pulling pranks on classmates and her brother. While walking to the library, Cassie visits a Halloween shop, which she did not think was there before. After ignoring the warning within the book to not read it aloud, a monster known as the Evil Thing escapes into the city after her brother thinks about it.
- Cody Linley as Sean Redford, a popular boy in middle school who likes Priscilla Wright. After feeling regret for helping Priscilla to bully Cassie, he leaves her, befriending Cassie and helping her defeat the monster.
- Brittany Elizabeth Curran as Priscilla Wright, a popular girl in middle school, who bullies Cassie for her goth appearance and takes pride in holding the festive title of "Pumpkin Queen".
- Alex Winzenread as Maximilian "Max" Keller, Cassie's little brother, who is easily frightened. Cassie thinks that her brother is annoying and a nuisance, so she frequently scares him. After Cassie, Max, and Sean work together to defeat the Evil Thing, she gains respect for her brother.
- Tobin Bell as the Stranger, who owns the Halloween shop. His shop is not always in the same location, as he moves from place to place to find people who like to terrify others.
- Michelle Duffy as Eileen Keller, Cassie & Max's mother
- John Hawkinson as Jack Keller, Cassie & Max's father

== Production ==
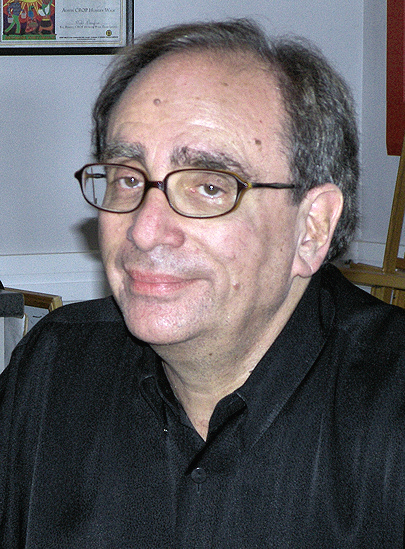
R. L. Stine wrote the book The Haunting Hour, upon which the film was based.

Margaret Loesch, who founded Fox Kids and the Hallmark Channel, served as the executive producer. The film's music score was composed by Chris Hajian. Dan Angel wrote the script. Angel stated that this film is aimed at younger audience and does not feature explicit graphic elements.

R. L. Stine was consulted for how the script should be written. There was supposed to be a series based on the short stories in R. L. Stine's book, but the executive producers decided to film their own original story, and Stine contributed what he thought should be added to it. Stine said that the film does not differentiate too much from his short stories.

Filming took place in the borough of Carnegie, Pennsylvania as well as Cranberry Township in October and November 2006. Filmed in Pittsburgh, the local Steeltown Entertainment Project has a credit in the film's beginning for investing in the film's production. Other people in Pittsburgh have credits at the end of the film. Over 100 local citizens had a part in the film's production. Loesch stated that the filming could not have happened in Pittsburgh without the help of Steeltown. A problem during the production was how many hours children can work each day, due to child labor laws.

Product placement for the film includes a cookie from the restaurant chain Eat'n Park and Papa John's Pizza. The use of pizza delivery by Papa John's Pizza in the film was regarded by Common Sense Media reviewer Heather Boerner as "overly integrated product placement", which she criticized it.

Gregory Nicotero and Howard Berger designed the animatronic monster, The Evil Thing, which was created by Nicotero's company KNB FX, the same company that did the special effects for The Chronicles of Narnia: The Lion, the Witch and the Wardrobe. The monster's two heads were controlled by two people. Cody Linley described the monster as "nasty", while the director Alex Zamm said, "That's lunch".

== Release ==
=== Home media ===
In the United States, the film was rated as "PG" by the Motion Picture Association for "scary content and thematic elements". It was rated "12" by the British Board of Film Classification in the United Kingdom.

The Haunting Hour: Don't Think About It was released on DVD with seven special features, including Emily Osment singing "I Don't Think About It", a behind the scenes video of the production, a personality test that compares the viewer to the characters, an interview with R. L. Stine and the film's cast, and three trailers for other films. The DVD is in widescreen format with English Dolby Digital 5.0 sound. Subtitles on the DVD are available in English, French, and Spanish. The DVD was released on September 4, 2007 in the United States, and on October 22 in the United Kingdom.

The DVD release of The Haunting Hour: Don't Think About It was reported as the fourth top children's DVD rental on a chart from the Orlando Sentinel, published in September 2007.

=== Television ===
The film aired on the children's cable channel Cartoon Network on September 7, 2007. A re-airing of the film received the most viewers of that week for the channel.

== Reception ==
=== Critical response ===
The film received mostly positive reviews. William Lee, a reviewer writing for the Movie Metropolis, said: "Don't Think About It is a very simplistic and straightforward tale. The characters all fit into the standard roles of popular boy, outsider and mean girl, and they never advance beyond those descriptions".

Nick Lyons of DVD Talk wrote: "As the children's horror movie/television field is sparse, this film is a perfect opportunity for youngins to experience the genre before eventually moving on to classic horror movies. Hopefully we shall see more Haunting Hour films in the future". In her review for About.com, Carey Bryson said: "The movie is a great Halloween flick for kids in the target age group (about ages 8-14, depending on their ability to handle scary content), and stars some of the big names in current kid culture". Melanie Dee of Yahoo! Voices called The Haunting Hour: Don't Think About It "a fast-paced movie" and noted that both children and parents would enjoy it.

=== Accolades ===
In 2008, film writers Dan Angel and Billy Brown were nominated for a Writers Guild of America Award for the Children's Script - Long Form or Special category. At the 29th Young Artist Awards, Cody Linley and Emily Osment were nominated for Best Performance in a TV Movie, Miniseries, or Special - Leading Young Actor and Actress categories, respectively.

== Spin-off ==
The film spawned a television spin-off series called R. L. Stine's The Haunting Hour, which premiered in October 2010 on the Hub Network. The series was similar to R. L. Stine's previous anthology television series, Goosebumps, and had a different story in each episode. The show was cancelled in 2014.

== See also ==
- List of films set around Halloween
