= You Are the Only One (Emily Osment song) =

Single by Emily Osment

from the album All the Right Wrongs
- Released: February 27, 2010
- Recorded: 2009
- Genre: Pop rock
- Length: 2:57
- Label: Wind-up
- Songwriters: Emily Osment; Anthony Fagenson; James Maxwell Collins

Emily Osment singles chronology
"All the Way Up" (2009)	"You Are the Only One" (2010)	"Let's Be Friends" (2010)

You Are the Only One is a song recorded by American actress and singer Emily Osment for her debut extended play (EP), All the Right Wrongs (2009). The song was released through Wind-up Records on February 27, 2010, as the second and final single from the EP. The song failed to chart in the United States, however, it made some impact on the Canadian Digital Charts.

== Background ==
"You Are the Only One" was co-written by Emily Osment, along with James Maxwell Collins and Anthony Fagenson. The song was recorded by Osment while on the set of the hit Disney show, Hannah Montana. She stated during an interview that the song was finished after nearly 3 months of working on it. It is the fifth track from Osment's debut extended play, All the Right Wrongs. Originally, "You Are the Only One" was intended to be released as the lead single. However, Osment pushed for the release of "All the Way Up", and eventually her record label agreed to release it as her debut single.

== Reception ==
Critical response to "You Are the Only One" was generally mixed. Andrew Leahy, of Allmusic, stated that "After flirting with pop and country on her early recordings, Emily Osment underwent a rock & roll makeover for her debut EP, All the Right Wrongs." They also went on to state that "Despite some fairly catchy songs, [Osment] never quite shakes [herself] free of the Disney machine: [she] embraces Auto-Tune, emphasizes overly polished production, and generally whittles away at the sharp teeth these tunes might've otherwise had. In their review of the album, absolutepunk.net began by saying "You Are the Only One" was "unfortunately the next" and the song is most nauseating, and the lyrics are atrocious at best. They even went on to say that Osment was suffering a major identity crisis (referring to her signing with Wind-up Records instead of Hollywood Records like most Disney artist.).

Paul Schultz, by The trades stated that "an 80s-era arrangement on "You Are the Only One" that explores the flips and flops of teenage love. It is the most impressive vocal delivery of the set, as Emily sings harmony with herself in spirited concord". The single did receive positive reviews as well, though. In their review of the single, sodahead.com said the song has a catchy beat and a good message. They went on to say that the song "is one of the slower songs on Emily’s album, but still a great listen! The guitars pick up during the chorus and definitely add something very special to the song".

== Music video ==
=== Concept ===
The official music video for "You Are the Only One" was directed by Aaron A. The director is known by working many artists as Nelly Furtado on the video "Do It" and the videography of the band Down with Webster and the singer Fefe Dobson. It was filmed in last January, and was released on February 26, 2010, one day before the release date of the song. The video shows Osment in various scenes at a house party, with her (seemingly) boyfriend. At one point in the video, it starts raining lightly inside the house. Guests slowly leave as the raining slowly gets harder. At the end, the raining stops and her boyfriend is the only person left in the house. He kisses her on the cheek, takes her by the hand, and they leave. As of September 27, 2012, the video has 2,493,269 views on YouTube.

=== Synopsis ===
The video was released on February 26, 2010, a day before the release of the single. The concept is very simple. Emily is at a party with her love interest, and she is trying to get his attention, but he keeps ignoring her and spends more time with his friends. Every time he leaves her, it starts to pour rain inside the house, but every time they are together, the storm ends. The indoor rainstorm symbolizes that there is no hiding from the hard times. The storm will follow them inside the house. At the end of the video, however, the boy is back with Emily, and he gives her a kiss and leads her out of the house, holding her hand.

== Promotion ==
Unlike Osment's previous songs (the ones recorded for soundtracks on Disney), "You Are the Only One", like "All the Way Up", didn't receive any promotion from Disney Channel, due to Osment's label being Wind-up Records, instead of Hollywood Records. Osment also performed the single on her "Halloween Bash", as well as on her Clap Your Hands Tour, along with previous single "All the Way Up". She also toured in Canada, where promoted the song. She also performed a set of songs on the local television station Orange Loung, Universal Citywalk, and at a Walmart concert. On March 25, 2010 Osment performed the single on TV show Good Day New York.

== Track listing ==
Single version

No.	Title	Writer(s)	Length
1.	"You Are the Only One"	Emily Osment, Anthony Fagenson, James Maxwell Collins	2:56
