= Lovesick (Emily Osment song) =

2011 single by Emily Osment

Single by Emily Osment

from the album Fight or Flight
- Released: October 19, 2010
- Recorded: 2010
- Genre: Electropop; dance-pop
- Length: 3:25
- Label: Wind-up
- Songwriters: Emily Osment; Toby Gad; Lindy Robbins
- Producer: Nellee Hooper

Emily Osment singles chronology
"Let's Be Friends" (2010)	"Lovesick" (2010)	"Black Coffee Morning" (2019)

"Lovesick" is a song recorded by American actress and singer Emily Osment for her debut studio album, Fight or Flight (2010). It was released through Wind-up Records on October 19, 2010, as the second and final single from the album. It was written by Osment, Toby Gad, Lindy Robbins and was produced by Nellee Hooper. The music video for "Lovesick" premiered on January 14, 2011, exclusively on Myspace.

"Lovesick" was released as Osment's first single in the UK, using a different cover art that was previously used to promote "Let's Be Friends"; it's also used for the EP version of the song. It has been used as the official track to promote popular multichannel ITV2 in the spring of 2011 and thus, has received strong download sales due to its popularity.

== Music video ==
The music video is directed by Daniel "Cloud" Campos, premiered exclusively on MySpace and YouTube. The video featured a whole new look to Osment with a metallic dress and a new hairstyle. The entire video took place in the dark with various types of lighting revealing Osment and the band performing. These various lights include colored lighting and flashlights attached to the hands of Osment's band members. The video was shot on location somewhere in Los Angeles, CA. On December 15, 2010, Osment uploaded a fan music video to the song onto her YouTube channel. The video features pictures of her fans with the word "Lovesick." On December 17, 2010, a behind-the-scenes look at the music video was released, which also discusses the theme, design, costumes, etc.

== Chart performance ==
"Lovesick" debuted on the UK Singles Chart at number 156. On April 17, 2011, the single entered the UK top 100 at number 67. On April 24, the song jumped 10 places to number 57.

== Track listing ==
Single version

No.	Title	Writer(s)	Length
1.	"Lovesick"	Emily Osment, Toby Gad, Lindy Robbins	3:26

EP version

No.	Title	Writer(s)	Length
1.	"Lovesick"	Osment, Gad, Robbins	3:26
2.	"Lovesick (The Elder Jepson Remix)"	Osment, Gad, Robbins	4:23
3.	"Lovesick (The Price Villiam Remix)"	Osment, Gad, Robbins	3:37
4.	"Lovesick (The Coltman Remix)"	Osment, Gad, Robbins	5:43

== Personnel ==
Credits for "Lovesick" adapted from AllMusic.

- Doug Fenske - mixing
- Toby Gad - engineering, vocal producer
- Nellee Hooper - producer
- Scott Hull - mastering
- Emily Osment - primary artist
- Lindy Robbins - composer

== Charts ==
Chart performance for "Lovesick"
Chart (2011)	Peak position
Canada Hot 100 (Billboard)	66
Lithuania (EHR)	60
Scottish Singles Sales (Official Charts)	45
South Korea (International Chart) (Gaon Chart)	2
UK Singles (Official Charts)	57

== Release history ==
Country	Release date	Format
United States	October 19, 2010	Contemporary hit radio
Australia	February 4, 2011	Digital download
France	February 4, 2011	Digital download
Japan	February 4, 2011	Digital download
Ireland	March 11, 2011	Digital download
United Kingdom	March 11, 2011	Digital download
Ireland	April 29, 2011	Digital EP
United Kingdom	April 29, 2011	Digital EP
