= Push Play =

American pop/rock band

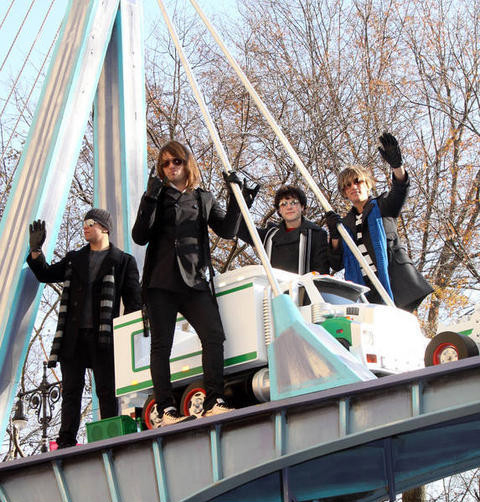

Background information
- Origin: Long Island, New York
- Genres: Pop rock
- Years active: 2005–2012
- Label: Wind-up
- Past members: CJ Baran; Steve Scarola; Nick DeTurris; Derek Ries
- Website: pushplaysite.com

Push Play was an American pop/rock band formed on Long Island, New York, in 2006. The band consisted of CJ Baran (lead vocals, rhythm guitar, keyboards), Steve Scarola (lead guitar, keyboards, backing vocals), Nick DeTurris (bass) and Derek Ries (drums). The band originally found independent success by utilizing social networks, new media, touring, and distributing their own music on various digital vendors including iTunes. Their charitable efforts were nationally recognized through the Push Play for Purpose campaign, a commitment to donate free performances in effort to raise funds for a multitude of charities. Push Play eventually signed to record label Wind-up Records in June 2009, where they released the album Found. In April 2010, the band announced they were parting ways to pursue personal goals, ending their four years as a band.

== Music ==
Push Play's first self-released album Deserted, was made available in 2007. Deserted remained on the chart for multiple weeks throughout December 2007. Dear Santa, the band's second self-release was a 10-track, limited-edition, Christmas album made available on November 28, 2008 during the band's performance at the Patchogue Theatre. In June 2009, Push Play landed a record deal with Wind-up Records. The band immediately began recording their debut album as a signed act. The album's first single "Midnight Romeo" received national radio airplay and reached No. 37 on the mainstream Top 40 radio chart. The full-length album Found was released nationwide on September 29, 2009 and soon after landed on the Billboard Top Heatseekers chart.

== Notable performances and appearances ==
In the summer of 2008, the band was a featured guest at Billboard’s What Teens Want conference. Through June 30, 2008, the band had raised over $97,000 for charity through their commitment to donating performances for charity. This was part of their nationally recognized Push Play for Purpose campaign. Their efforts through the Purpose Tour allowed the band to raise money for an extensive list of charities including Friends of the Arts and Fight for Charity. Other charitable efforts included their extensive work with Do Something, where the band helped raise over $10,000 and increase awareness of community efforts. The band also helped raise donations for Invisible Children with a charity concert held at the Richfield Chalet in Hubertus, WI. Push Play soon began receiving media notoriety, landing front page articles in the arts and entertainment sections of both Newsday and The New York Times. Print placement also included a front page feature on the cover of Goodtimes Magazine and being voted Best Band in the Long Island Press' Best of L.I. 2010. Push Play was selected to perform at the 2008 Macy's Thanksgiving Day Parade on Hess’ Bridge of the Future float, a first for an unsigned artist. They followed up with other holiday performances at the 85th annual New York Stock Exchange Christmas tree lighting, headlined by Aretha Franklin and a CW televised performance at the Reckson Plaza tree lighting. The band also landed an appearance as featured guests on CBS's The Morning Show with Mike and Juliet. At the 2009 Bamboozle, Push Play was the only band to play all 3 days of the event. This included the band channeling Muse at Friday’s The Hoodwink show. Later that summer, Push Play was booked to play the Bay Stage at Jones Beach Theater. In 2009, Push Play headlined a sold out show at The Fillmore Irving Plaza serving as a record release party for their most recent album, Found. Their last performance came on February 20, 2010 at the Nassau Coliseum in Uniondale, NY where Push Play took the main stage of PopCon in support of Justin Bieber and Selena Gomez.

== Band members ==
- CJ Baran – lead vocals, rhythm guitar, keyboards
- Steve Scarola – backing vocals, lead guitar
- Nick DeTurris – bass
- Derek Ries – drums

== Discography ==
=== Albums ===
- Deserted (2007)
- Dear Santa (2008)
- Found (2009)

=== Singles ===
Year	Title	Peak chart positions		Album
Year	Title	US Pop	T40 Main	Album
2008	"There She Goes Again"	—	—	Deserted
2009	"Midnight Romeo"	16	37	Found
2009	Covergirl	—	—	Found
2009	"Stay Here This Christmas"	—	—	n/a
2010	"My Everything" (Radio Edit)	—	—	Found
