= Mandi Perkins =

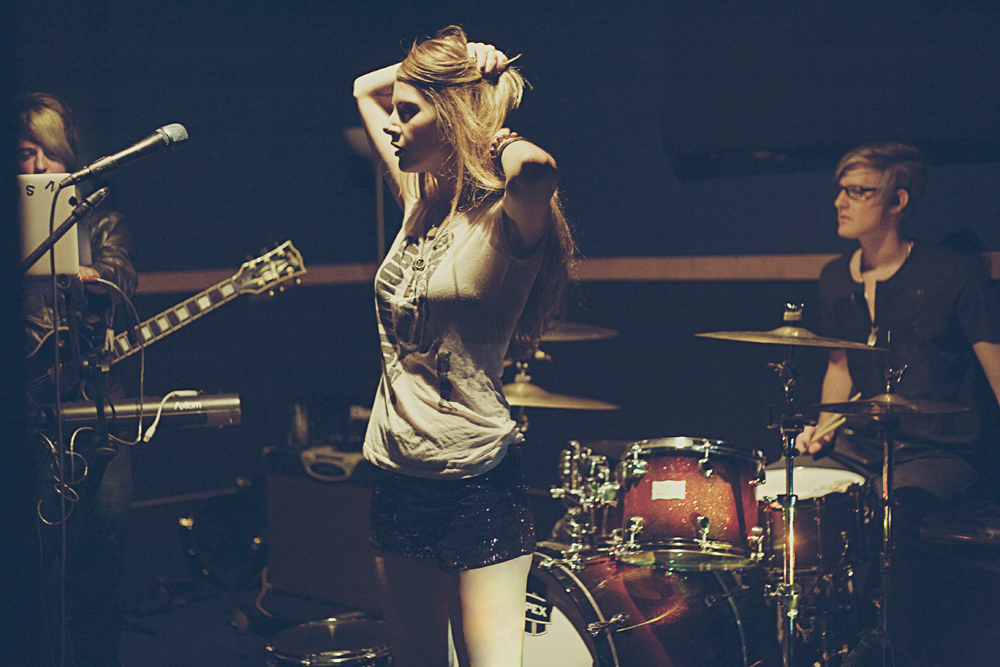
- Mandi Perkins, 2012

Background information
- Born: Toronto, Ontario, Canada
- Genres: Alternative rock; pop; electro; indie
- Occupations: Singer, songwriter
- Instrument: Vocals
- Years active: 2003—present
- Labels: Sony Music/RCA Victor, BMG, Sony/ATV
- Member of: of Verona
- Website: ofverona.com

Mandi Perkins is a Canadian songwriter and lead singer of the band of Verona.

== Biography ==
Mandi Perkins was born and raised in Toronto, Ontario, Canada. She attended UC Berkeley where she graduated with a degree in English literature. Following graduation, she moved to Los Angeles to pursue a career in music while attending law school.

Perkins toured the country and performed regularly on the Sunset Strip, Silverlake and in Echo Park at such venues as The Roxy, The Viper Room, The Satellite, The Echo and The Troubadour. She completed her first independent full-length album, bleeding the line ..., in 2007 with producer Warren Huart.

She then began working with music producer Jeff Rosen, who introduced her to executives at Sony Music, which signed her to a record deal. Mandi immediately began work on her major label debut album, Alice in No Man's Land. All the lyrics on Alice in No Man's Land were written by Perkins and the album was produced by Warren Huart and mixed by Michael Brauer. After the collapse of the RCA Victor label and the firing of her label head, Alice in No Man's Land only saw a limited digital release.

In the first half of 2009, Perkins played the South by Southwest festival and did a club tour in the United States. Perkins asked for a release from her contract with Sony in June 2009 and started a new band named of Verona in July 2011.

== Discography ==
Release date	Title	Label
2003	Mandi Perkins (EP)	Self-released Demo
2003	The Mandi Perkins Band (EP)	Self-released Demo
May 18, 2005	Broken Window (EP)	Self-released Demo
August 14, 2007	Bleeding the Line	De Novo Music
August 4, 2008	Alice in No Man's Land	Sony BMG
2009	Everybody Knows EP	De Novo Music
