= If I Didn't Have You (Disney song) =

2001 single by Billy Crystal and John Goodman

Song by John Goodman and Billy Crystal

from the album Monsters, Inc.
- Released: 2001
- Recorded: 2000
- Genre: Dixieland; jazz
- Length: 3:41
- Label: Walt Disney
- Songwriter: Randy Newman

Audio
- "If I Didn't Have You" on YouTube

"If I Didn't Have You" is a song written by Randy Newman, that appears during the end credits of the 2001 Disney·Pixar animated film, Monsters, Inc. Sung by John Goodman and Billy Crystal (voices of James P. Sullivan and Mike Wazowski, respectively), the song won the 2001 Academy Award for Best Original Song. This was Newman's first Oscar. Previously, Newman had been nominated fifteen times in the Best Score and Best Song categories, but had never won. Arguably "the film's lone song", the tune serves as the major motif for the film.

== Critical reception ==
AllMusic said, "For all its charm, it can't help but sound a bit like a second-rate version of Toy Story's 'You've Got a Friend in Me', but it's still a winning song." JazzHistoryOnline deemed it a "heartfelt love song". The New York Times described it as "one of his lesser efforts". Sydney Morning Herald deemed it "his input in the film's feel-good soundtrack", adding, "Newman's astute musical nuances are crucial in cementing the film's broad appeal". JazzTimes called it "charming". DVDDizzy called it "a pleasant number that captures the protagonists' friendship".

Newman received a standing ovation when collecting his Best Original Song trophy for the song. He said: "I want to thank, first of all, the music branch [of the Motion Picture Academy] for giving me so many chances to be humiliated over the years...I am absolutely astounded that I won for this." During the ceremony he performed "If I Didn't Have You" with help from actor John Goodman. Later, he said "I'd rather have had it for a score, but I was much more moved by the event than I ever thought I would be. You know it's not a measure of anything real, but I was up there and so was Jennifer Lopez and the orchestra stood up and it kind of got to me. I was almost embarrassed – but not quite."

== Versions ==
=== Film versions ===
Two versions of "If I Didn't Have You" appear on the film's soundtrack: one sung by Billy Crystal and John Goodman, who voice the film's main characters, Mike and Sulley and one sung by Newman. The tune also serves as the film's theme, which plays during the opening credits.

=== Riders in the Sky version ===
The song was covered by Riders in the Sky on the 2002 album Monsters, Inc. Scream Factory Favorites. The album won the 2003 Grammy Award for Best Musical Album for Children.

== Mitchel Musso and Emily Osment version ==
"If I Didn't Have You"

Single by Mitchel Musso and Emily Osment

from the album Disneymania 6
- Released: May 10, 2008
- Recorded: 2007
- Genre: Dance-pop; teen pop
- Length: 4:38
- Label: Walt Disney
- Songwriter: Randy Newman
- Producer: Bryan Todd

Hannah Montana co-stars Mitchel Musso and Emily Osment recorded a cover version of the song for the Disneymania 6 album. The song was produced by Bryan Todd. The two also filmed a music video for their remake.

=== Charts ===
Chart performance for "If I Didn't Have You"
Chart (2008)	Peak position
US Bubbling Under Hot 100 (Billboard)	10
US Digital Song Sales (Billboard)	64
