= Kongos discography =

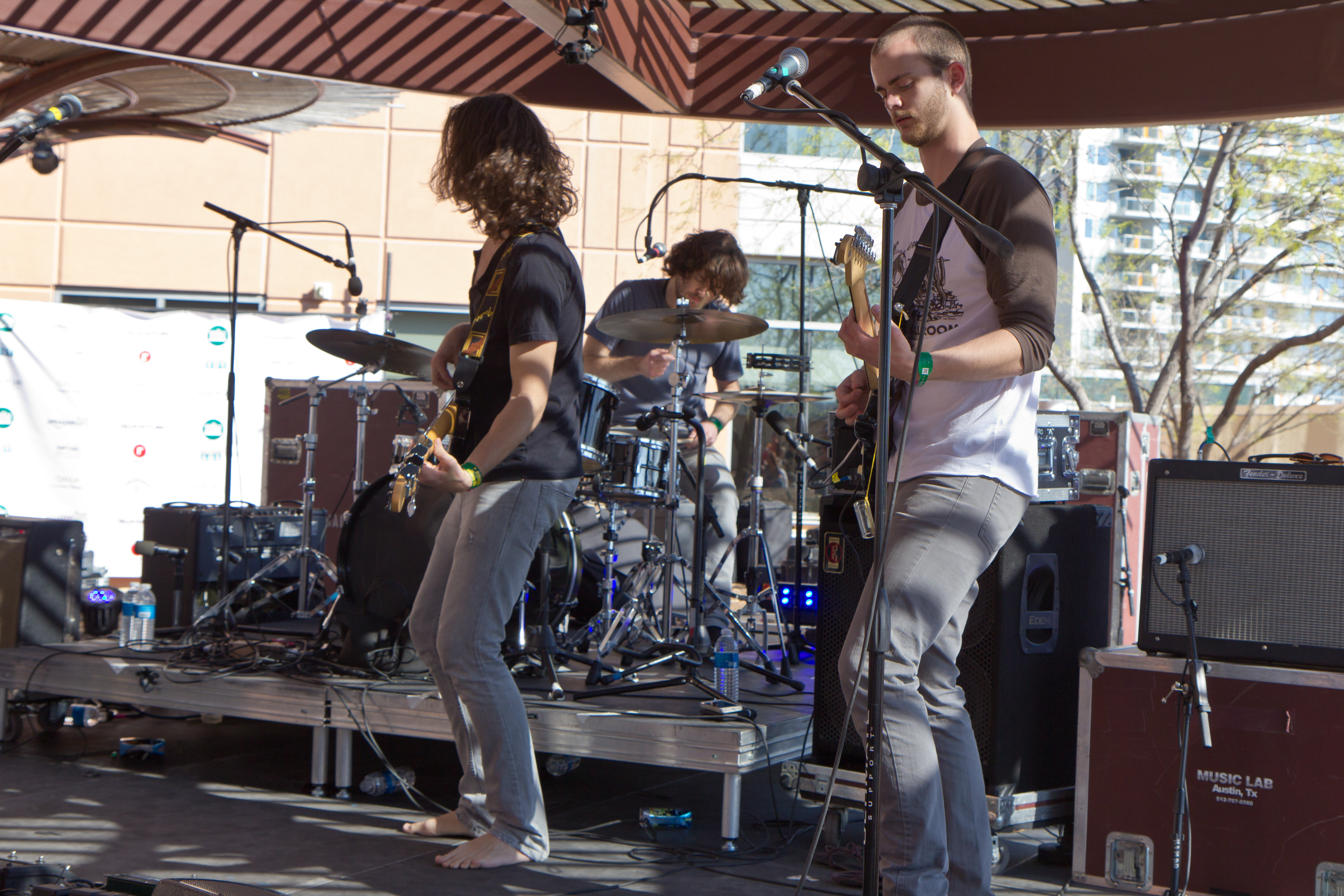
- Kongos performing live in 2013
- Studio albums: 5
- Singles: 7
- Music videos: 9

South African alternative rock band Kongos has released five studio albums.

== Albums ==
=== Studio albums ===
Title	Details	Peak chart positions				
Title	Details	AUS Hit.	CAN	UK DL	US	US Rock
Kongos	Released: August 14, 2007; Label: Epic	—	—	—	—	—
Lunatic	Released: December 28, 2012; Label: Tokoloshe, Epic	18	22	96	39	11
Egomaniac	Released: June 10, 2016; Label: Epic	15	42	—	80	11
1929, Pt. 1	Released: January 18, 2019; Label: Tokoloshe	—	—	—	—	—
1929, Pt. 2	Released: October 11, 2019; Label: Tokoloshe	—	—	—	—	—
1929, Pt. 3	Released: April 22, 2022; Label: Tokoloshe	—	—	—	—	—

=== Instrumental albums ===
Title	Details
1929, Pt. 1 (Instrumentals)	Released: January 1, 2020; Label: Tokoloshe
1929, Pt. 2 (Instrumentals)	Released: January 8, 2020; Label: Tokoloshe

== EPs ==
Title	Details
Lunatic Acoustics	Released: November 20, 2015; Label: Epic
1929, Pt. 1 (Altermixes)	Released: June 4, 2019; Label: Tokoloshe
Far Away	Released: November 27, 2020; Label: Tokoloshe
Speak Free	Released: March 11, 2022; Label: Tokoloshe

== Singles ==
=== As lead artist ===
List of singles, with selected chart positions and certifications, showing year released and album name
Single	Year	Peak chart positions										Certifications	Album
Single	Year	AUS	AUT	CAN	NZ	POL	SCO	SPA	UK	US	US Rock	Certifications	Album
"I'm Only Joking"	2011	—	—	—	—	—	—	—	—	—	24		Lunatic
"Come with Me Now"	2012	94	65	7	36	38	58	47	125	31	2	BPI: Silver; MC: 2× Platinum; RIAA: 2× Platinum	Lunatic
"I Want to Know"	2012	—	—	—	—	—	—	—	—	—	— (Note: "I Want to Know" did not enter the Hot Rock & Alternative Songs chart, but peaked at number 37 on the Alternative Airplay chart.)		Lunatic
"Escape"	2012	—	—	—	—	—	—	—	—	—	—		Lunatic
"Sex on the Radio"	2012	—	—	—	—	—	—	—	—	—	—		Lunatic
"Take It from Me"	2016	—	—	—	—	—	—	—	—	—	16		Egomaniac
"The World Would Run Better"	2016	—	—	—	—	—	—	—	—	—	—		Egomaniac
"I Want It Free"	2016	—	—	—	—	—	—	—	—	—	—		Egomaniac
"Real Life"	2018	—	—	—	—	—	—	—	—	—	—		1929, Pt. 1
"Everything Must Go"	2018	—	—	—	—	—	—	—	—	—	—		1929, Pt. 1
"Keep Your Head"	2018	—	—	—	—	—	—	—	—	—	—		1929, Pt. 1
"Pay for the Weekend"	2018	—	—	—	—	—	—	—	—	—	—		1929, Pt. 1
"Western Fog"	2019	—	—	—	—	—	—	—	—	—	—		1929, Pt. 2
"Tomorrow"	2019	—	—	—	—	—	—	—	—	—	—		1929, Pt. 2
"You Are Strange"	2019	—	—	—	—	—	—	—	—	—	—		1929, Pt. 2
"Nothing of My Own"	2019	—	—	—	—	—	—	—	—	—	—		1929, Pt. 2
"I Forgot To"	2019	—	—	—	—	—	—	—	—	—	—		1929, Pt. 2
"Fools"	2019	—	—	—	—	—	—	—	—	—	—		1929, Pt. 2
"Push"	2019	—	—	—	—	—	—	—	—	—	—		1929, Pt. 2
"We're Almost Home"	2019	—	—	—	—	—	—	—	—	—	—		1929, Pt. 2
"Stuck in Time"	2019	—	—	—	—	—	—	—	—	—	—		1929, Pt. 2
"Fly"	2020	—	—	—	—	—	—	—	—	—	—		1929, Pt. 3
"Autocorrect (Rock Remix)"	2020	—	—	—	—	—	—	—	—	—	—		Non-album single
"Terrified (Friday Night)"	2020	—	—	—	—	—	—	—	—	—	—		1929, Pt. 3
"Mad Men"	2020	—	—	—	—	—	—	—	—	—	—		1929, Pt. 3
"Lord of the Flies"	2020	—	—	—	—	—	—	—	—	—	—		1929, Pt. 3
"Small Talk"	2020	—	—	—	—	—	—	—	—	—	—		1929, Pt. 3
"Far Away"	2020	—	—	—	—	—	—	—	—	—	—		1929, Pt. 3
"—" denotes a recording that did not chart or was not released in that territory.

=== As featured artist ===
List of singles showing year released and album name
Single	Year	Album
"Because I Want To" (Chevy Mustang featuring Eve 6, Kongos, and Fitness)	2020	Non-album singles
"Aphrodisiac" (Chevy Mustang featuring Kongos, Eve 6, and Fitness)	2020	Non-album singles
"Can I Be Your Friend" (Chevy Mustang featuring Evan Rachel Wood, Kongos, Eve 6, and Fitness)	2020	Non-album singles
"Panpsychic" (Chevy Mustang featuring Kongos, Eve 6, and Fitness)	2020	Non-album singles
"I Don't Care" (Chevy Mustang featuring Kongos, Eve 6, and Fitness)	2020	Non-album singles
"Man in the Middle" (Chevy Mustang featuring Kevin Federline, Kongos, Eve 6, and Fitness)	2020	Non-album singles
"Blue State" (Chevy Mustang featuring Kongos, Eve 6, and Fitness)	2020	Non-album singles
"Friction" (Ray Little featuring Kongos)	2020	Non-album singles
"Wrong Things" (Chevy Mustang featuring The one and only PPL MVR, Kongos, and Eve 6)	2020	Non-album singles
"Coming Down" (Ray Little featuring Kongos)	2021	Non-album singles
"Never Give Up" (Ray Little featuring Kongos)	2021	Non-album singles

== Music videos ==
List of music videos, showing year released
Title	Year
"I'm Only Joking"	2011
"Come with Me Now"	2012
"Hey I Don't Know"	2012
"Escape"	2012
"Traveling On"	2012
"I Want to Know"	2015
"Take It from Me"	2016
"I Don't Mind"	2017
"Everything Must Go"	2018
