= Eve 6 discography =

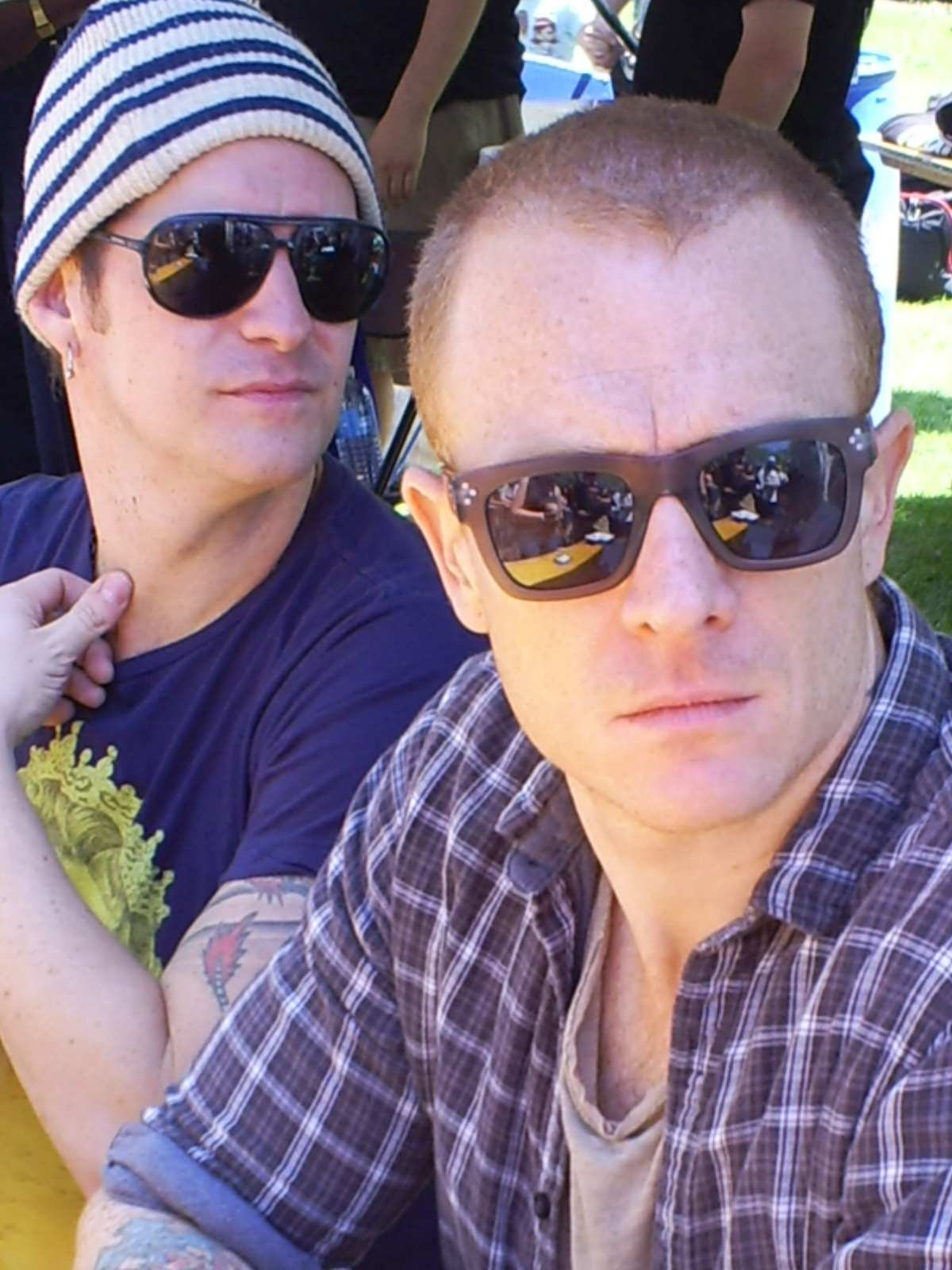
- Studio albums: 6
- Extended plays: 2
- Live albums: 1
- Singles: 13
- B-sides: 15

This is a comprehensive discography of official recordings by Eve 6, an American rock band from La Crescenta, California. They have released six studio albums and two EPs, of which 1.5 million copies have been certified by the RIAA.

== Albums ==
=== Studio albums ===
List of studio albums, with selected chart positions, sales figures and certifications
Title	Album details	Peak chart positions						Sales	Certifications
Title	Album details	US	CAN	US Alt.	US Heat.	US Indie	US Rock	Sales	Certifications
Eve 6	Released: April 28, 1998; Label: RCA; Formats: CD, CS, DI, LP	33	70	—	1	—	—		RIAA: Platinum
Horrorscope	Released: July 25, 2000; Label: RCA; Formats: CD, CS, DI, LP	34	26	—	—	—	—	US: 657,000	RIAA: Gold; MC: Gold
It's All in Your Head	Released: July 22, 2003; Label: RCA; Formats: CD, CS, DI	27	73	—	—	—	—	US: 192,000	
Speak in Code	Released: April 24, 2012; Label: Fearless; Formats: CD, DI, LP	40	-	10	—	8	14		
Hyper Relevisation	Released: September 23, 2022; Label: Velocity; Formats: CD, DI, LP	—	-	—	—	—	—		
Dream Fist	Released: October 4, 2024; Label: Self released; Formats: CD, DI, LP	—	-	—	—	—	—		
"—" denotes a release that did not chart.

=== Live albums ===
Title	Details
Extended Versions	Released: November 9, 2010; Label: BMG; Format: CD, digital download
The Fly Record Live	Released: October 24, 2020; Label: Eve 6; Format: LP, digital download

== Extended plays ==
List of EPs, with selected chart positions
Title	EP details	Peak chart positions
Title	EP details	US Current
Eleventeen	Released: 1996; Label: Deuce Industries; Format: CD	—
Grim Value	Released: June 25, 2021; Label: Velocity; Format: CD, LP, cassette, digital download	78
"—" denotes a release that did not chart.

== Singles ==
List of singles, with selected chart positions, showing year released and album name
Title	Year	Peak chart positions										Certifications	Album
Title	Year	US	US Adult	US Alt.	US Main.	US Pop	US Rock	CAN	ICE	NZ	UK	Certifications	Album
"Inside Out"	1998	28	16	1	5	11	— (Note: "Inside Out" did not enter the US Hot Rock & Alternative Songs but peaked at number four on the US Active Rock chart.)	36	24	—	—	RMNZ: Gold	Eve 6
"Leech"	1998	—	—	6	10	—	— (Note: "Leech" did not enter the US Hot Rock & Alternative Songs but peaked at number eight on the US Active Rock chart.)	—	—	—	79		Eve 6
"Superhero Girl"	1998	—	—	—	—	—	—	—	—	—	—		Eve 6
"Open Road Song"	1999	—	—	23	—	—	—	—	—	—	—		Eve 6
"Tongue Tied"	1999	—	—	—	—	—	—	—	—	—	—		Eve 6
"Promise"	2000	— (Note: "Promise" did not enter the Billboard Hot 100, but peaked at number 8 on the Bubbling Under Hot 100 Singles chart.)	33	3	25	40	— (Note: "Promise" did not enter the US Hot Rock & Alternative Songs but peaked at number 27 on the US Active Rock chart.)	—	—	—	—		Horrorscope
"On the Roof Again"	2000	—	—	19	—	—	— (Note: "On the Roof Again" did not enter the US Hot Rock & Alternative Songs but peaked at number 35 on the US Heritage Rock chart.)	—	—	—	—		Horrorscope
"Here's to the Night"	2001	30	7	33	—	14	—	—	—	34	—		Horrorscope
"Think Twice"	2003	—	—	9	—	—	—	—	—	—	—		It's All in Your Head
"At Least We're Dreaming"	2003	—	—	—	—	—	—	—	—	—	—		It's All in Your Head
"Victoria"	2012	—	—	25	—	—	50	—	—	—	—		Speak in Code
"Curtain"	2012	—	—	—	—	—	—	—	—	—	—		Speak in Code
"Black Nova"	2021	—	—	—	—	—	—	—	—	—	—		Grim Value
"You Were Right" (with Bass Drum of Death)	2021	—	—	—	—	—	—	—	—	—	—		Non-album single
"Can We Combine"	2021	—	—	—	—	—	—	—	—	—	—		Grim Value
"Sound System" (with We Are the Union)	2021	—	—	—	—	—	—	—	—	—	—		Non-album single
"Androgyne Friend"	2021	—	—	—	—	—	—	—	—	—	—		Hyper Relevisation
"Get You"	2022	—	—	—	—	—	—	—	—	—	—		Hyper Relevisation
"—" denotes a recording that did not chart or was not released in that territory.

== B-sides and other appearances ==
Year	Song	Album
1998	"Open Road Song" (acoustic version)	"Leech" single, Eve 6 (Japanese release)
1998	"Inside Out" (acoustic version)	"Leech" single, Eve 6 (Japanese release)
1999	"Allison"	Where Is My Mind? - A Pixies Tribute
2000	"Jet Plane"	Horrorscope (Japanese release)
2000	"Waterfalls" (TLC cover)	"Promise" single, "Here's to the Night" single
2000	"First Noel (I Like Christmas)"	Kevin and Bean's The Real Slim Santa
2001	"Anytime"	Out Cold soundtrack
2001	"Noel!, Noel!"	A Very Special Christmas 5
2002	"You Really Got Me"	The New Guy soundtrack
2003	"Velociraptor"	It's All in Your Head (Japanese release)
2003	"405"	EVE6MediaHQ exclusive digital download
2003	"Bring the Night On" (demo)	EVE6MediaHQ exclusive digital download
2003	"Burning Out"	EVE6MediaHQ exclusive digital download
2003	"Not Gonna Be Alone Tonight" (demo)	EVE6MediaHQ exclusive digital download
2003	"Still Here Waiting" (demo)	EVE6MediaHQ exclusive digital download

== Music videos ==
List of music videos, showing year released and directors
Title	Year	Director
"Inside Out"	1998	Scott Sampler
"Leech"	1998	Gavin Bowden
"Open Road Song"	1999	Mike Drumm
"Tongue Tied"	1999	Scott Sampler
"Promise"	2000	Marcos Siega
"Here's to the Night"	2001	Marcos Siega
"Think Twice"	2003	Bryan Barber
"Victoria"	2012	Bill Fishman
"Curtain"	2012	Patrick Meier
"Black Nova"	2021	Max Collins and Hether Fortune
"Can We Combine"	2021	April Clark and Callie Zucker
"I Wanna Bite Your Face"	2021	Naz Massaro
"Androgyne Friend"	2021	Andrew Nguyen
