= Speak in Code =

Studio album by Eve 6
- Released: April 24, 2012
- Genre: Alternative rock
- Length: 42:05
- Label: Fearless
- Producer: Don Gilmore

Eve 6 chronology
It's All in Your Head (2003)	Speak in Code (2012)	Grim Value (2021)

Singles from Speak in Code
- 1. "Victoria" Released: February 28, 2012; 2. "Curtain" Released: November 21, 2012

Speak in Code is the fourth studio album by American alternative rock band Eve 6, released on April 24, 2012, through Fearless Records. It was the band's first album in nine years since the release of It's All in Your Head in 2003 and is also the only album by the band that was released through Fearless Records.

This is the band's last album to feature founding drummer Tony Fagenson, who parted ways with the band in April 2018.

== Background ==
The band signed with Fearless Records on May 3, 2011 and started planning on entering the studio that June to record their fourth album with producer Don Gilmore.

== Recording ==
Various Evelogs were released on the band's official website throughout the band's recording of the album.

It was announced that Chris Lord-Alge finished the mixing of the album on September 30, 2011.

== Release ==
On January 15, 2012, Eve 6 announced that their fourth studio album, Speak In Code, would release on April 24, 2012, and that the lead single, "Victoria", would be released to rock radio on March 19, 2012. The songs "Lost & Found" and "Behind The Curtain" were also released ahead of the album.

== Critical response ==
Professional ratings
Review scores
Source	Rating
Allmusic	3/5 stars
USA Today	3/4 stars
The Washington Times	2.5/4 stars
Sputnikmusic	3.5/5 stars

Speak in Code received a positive three-star review from USA Today saying "the sound is lean and bright" and the band shows "enduring energy."

Andrew Leahey of The Washington Times said "For those who wish Eve 6 had never lost their mojo, “Speak in Code” is a nice trip down memory lane."

== Track listing ==
All lyrics are written by Max Collins.

No.	Title	Music	Length
1.	"Curtain"	Collins, Jon Siebels, Tony Fagenson, Don Gilmore	4:03
2.	"Victoria"	Collins, Fagenson	3:15
3.	"Situation Infatuation"	Collins, Siebels, Fagenson, Gilmore	3:33
4.	"B.F.G.F."	Collins, Fagenson	3:08
5.	"Lion's Den"	Collins	4:05
6.	"Blood Brothers"	Collins, Siebels, Fagenson, Gilmore	3:37
7.	"Lost & Found"	Collins, Fagenson	3:34
8.	"Moon"	Collins, Siebels, Fagenson	3:23
9.	"Downtown"	Collins, Fagenson, Gilmore	3:32
10.	"Trust Me"	Collins, Siebels, Fagenson	2:43
11.	"Everything"	Collins, Siebels, Fagenson, Gilmore	3:26
12.	"Pick Up the Pieces"	Collins, Fagenson	3:41
Total length:			42:05

iTunes bonus tracks
No.	Title	Length
13.	"Underachiever"	3:16
14.	"Red and Black"	4:14
15.	"Inside Out" (Acoustic version)	3:31
16.	"Here's to the Night" (Acoustic version)	3:49

Amazon bonus track
No.	Title	Length
17.	"Victoria" (Acoustic Version)	3:10

== Personnel ==
- Max Collins – bass, lead vocals
- Jon Siebels – guitar, backing vocals
- Tony Fagenson – drums, keyboards

Additional

- Jordan Feldstein – Management
- The Skeletones – Horns
- Scott Harrington – Legal
- Don Gilmore – Producer, Mixer (1, 5, 6, 7, 8, 9, 10, 11, 12)
- Chris Lord-Alge – Mixer (2, 3, 4)
- Brad Blackwood – Mastering
- Chris Foitle – A&R
- Michael Farrell – Artwork
- Ken Fermaglich – Booking

== Chart performance ==
Chart (2012)	Peak position
US Billboard 200	40
US Billboard Top Rock Albums	14
US Billboard Independent Albums	8
US Billboard Top Alternative Albums	12
