= One Assassination Under God Tour =

2024–26 concert tour by Marilyn Manson

- World tour by Marilyn Manson
- Promotional poster for the One Assassination Under God Tour
- Location: Asia; Europe; North America; South America
- Associated albums: One Assassination Under God – Chapter 1, One Assassination Under God – Chapter 2
- Start date: August 3, 2024
- End date: November 1, 2026
- Legs: 9
- No. of shows: 153
- Supporting acts: The Funeral Portrait; 5¢ Freakshow; The Blackmordia; Black Satellite; Seven Hours After Violet; Dead Posey; VOWWS; Orgy; The Hu

Marilyn Manson concert chronology
- Marilyn Manson 2019 Tour (2019); One Assassination Under God Tour (2024–26); Freaks on Parade Tour (2026)

The One Assassination Under God Tour is a concert tour by American rock band Marilyn Manson. It was launched in support of their twelfth studio album, One Assassination Under God – Chapter 1, which was released on November 22, 2024. The tour continued to 2026, in support of their thirteenth studio album One Assassination Under God – Chapter 2, which was issued on August 14, 2026.

The first leg of the tour was a North American co-headlining tour with metal bands Five Finger Death Punch and Slaughter to Prevail, with The Funeral Portrait appearing as opening act. The tour was interspersed with Marilyn Manson's own headlining shows. They went on to embark on their own tours of Europe, North and South America, and Asia. The tour is the band's first following abuse allegations leveled at the band's eponymous vocalist, and an ensuing criminal investigation, which resulted in no charges filed against Manson. The allegations have been cause to some minor protesting and criticism of the tour.

== Band members and opening acts ==
The band's first lineup for the tour consisted of Marilyn Manson on vocals, guitarist Tyler Bates and drummer Gil Sharone. These returning members were joined by two new members: guitarist Reba Meyers and bassist Piggy D., also known as Matthew Montgomery. Meyers, the first female member of the band, was met with a mixture of support and criticism on social media after it was revealed she had joined. In response, she issued a statement saying she was "proud to represent the growth, confidence, forgiveness, humanity, and change that comes with this, and to be up there [on stage] with such talented motherfuckers. Everyone is aiming for growth and not stagnation. World needs that attitude right now." She received messages of support from Ray Luzier of Korn, Andy Williams of Every Time I Die, Greg Puciato of Better Lovers, and her bandmates.

The tour's first leg was a co-headlining arena and amphitheater tour with American bands Five Finger Death Punch and Slaughter to Prevail. The opening act, The Funeral Portrait, were also the opener for a series of Marilyn Manson solo dates, which were interspersed throughout the co-headlining tour. These were Marilyn Manson's first solo headlining dates in five years. The Funeral Portrait were harassed online after it was revealed they would be performing alongside Manson. In response, the band's bassist said: "I'm sorry my band that has consistently played 200 cap[acity] venues for 7 years + has a chance to open shows in front of thousands of people, and people wanna be upset by it. ... If what we are doing isn't affecting your life personally, then why get mad about it? You weren't a fan before, and that's fine. No one is forcing anyone to go to these shows." The Funeral Portrait's song "Suffocate City" became their first number single on Billboard's Mainstream Rock chart shortly after the completion of their portion of the tour. Other opening acts for the remainder of the tour have included of 5¢ Freakshow, The Blackmordia, Black Satellite, Seven Hours After Violet, Dead Posey, and VOWWS.

Marilyn Manson continued to tour throughout 2025 and 2026. In January 2026, Bates announced he amicably departed the live band in order to focus on his film score work, but said he would be "actively supporting" their upcoming release One Assassination Under God – Chapter 2. The following month, the band's former bassist and producer Tim Sköld said he had rejoined the band. When the band resumed touring in April, it was confirmed Reba Meyers left to pursue her solo career, with Piggy D. and Nick Annis of Black Light Burns taking over on lead guitar. The band embarked on the "Freaks on Parade Tour" from August to September 2026, a co-headlining tour of North American arenas and amphitheatres with Rob Zombie, with The Hu and Orgy appearing as opening acts.

== Box office and reception ==
The tour's September 6, 2024 date at the Honda Center in Anaheim was met with a small protest. Billboard contributor Dave Brooks said overall sales for the Five Finger Death Punch, Marilyn Manson and Slaughter to Prevail tour were "OK at best". He said that Manson had previously done well in markets such as California, and that "some" of the Californian shows not selling out was "not great" for Manson. He said the real test of Manson's commercial viability as a touring act would come when he "does a small headline show or a real co-headline run". A writer for Houston Music Review said they were "blown away" by the amount of audience members who exited the 16,500-capacity Cynthia Woods Mitchell Pavilion in Houston following the completion of Manson's set. They said: "How would I know if it were hundreds or a thousand or more? All I can report is that I have never seen a massive exit like this one." Their writer noted: "I don't think it was at all a boycott of [Five Finger Death Punch]. I believe it was simply that Marilyn Manson was who they came to see and, satisfied, they were ready to go home."

The second leg of the tour was a sold-out Marilyn Manson headlining tour of Europe, which began in February 2025. In reviewing the band's show at Columbiahalle in Berlin, Rolling Stone Germany commended Manson's stage presence, saying: "The show that Manson delivers is fantastic. Manson, now clean, is so good, so physically present, that he no longer has to hide behind show/shock effects and costumes; his pure physical presence carries the entire evening." When reviewing the band's show at the Eventim Apollo in London, The Daily Telegraph praised the stage show and the band's musicianship, but their writer said they felt uncomfortable during the band's cover of "Sweet Dreams (Are Made of This)" due to its lyrics, despite saying fans were "kind, polite and rational."

The band appeared at the Arizona Bike Week Festival at WestWorld in Scottsdale on April 5. Their appearance was announced just three weeks before the festival took place, after Five Finger Death Punch withdrew "due to a family matter". The festival's organizer abandoned their no refunds policy as a result, and provided ticket holders with instructions on how to obtain a full refund. The festival's producer said: "We haven't had a ton of requests. A few people, but a lot of people are just as excited about Marilyn Manson."

In June in the United Kingdom, the Liberal Democrats leader of Bournemouth, Christchurch and Poole Council, Millie Earl, called for the cancellation of the October 31 concert at Bournemouth International Centre. The venue is owned by the Council, but the artists chosen to perform there are determined by the external entity BH Live. Earl contacted BH Live to protest the concert, but said the council could not force a cancellation due to the terms of the lease agreement. Earl was acting in response to an online campaign organized by Björn Suttka, who fights for "men accused of abuse to be denied a public platform." The concert went ahead as scheduled.

That same month, Green Party MP Siân Berry called for the cancellation of the October 29 concert at the Brighton Centre. She had written an open letter to the leader of Brighton & Hove City Council, asking them to cancel the concert at the Brighton Centre, which is wholly under state ownership. This campaign was also organized by Suttka. A week later, Ticketmaster informed customers that the show had been canceled. Supporters of Manson noted he had not been charged or convicted of any of the accusations following a four-year investigation by law enforcement, and said the cancellation was a result of cancel culture, artistic censorship, and was an infringement on freedom of speech.

Suttka additionally lobbied Nottingham City Council to cancel the band's November 2 at Motorpoint Arena Nottingham. Similar to the Bournemouth International Centre, the acts who perform at the Motorpoint Arena are determined by an external body. The Labour MP Alex Norris wrote to that external body, asking them to cancel the show, while the leader of Nottingham City Council, Neghat Khan, wrote to Home Secretary Yvette Cooper for legal advice. Khan said the council were reluctant to cancel the show outright, as they were forced to pay over £11,000 in legal bills and compensation, and issue a public apology, after they forced the cancellation of a talk by Julie Bindel at a library.

Nick Tyrone of Spiked said it was "striking" how progressives in the United Kingdom in the 2020s used the same tactics as the conversatives and religious right in North America in the 1990s to ban Manson from performing. He noted both campaigns threatened the future funding of state-owned venues, and amplified unproven claims in mainstream media, to achieve their goal of cancelling a concert. He said both groups were "absolutely convinced that Manson's mere presence" would have a "terrible impact on 'locals and the wider community'. And they're also absolutely convinced that they are in the right. ... It isn't enough for [people] to disagree with something—they have to ban it on behalf of everyone else. As they see it, no one in society should be subjected to something as supposedly morally wicked as Marilyn Manson. Won't anyone think of the children?"

The Archbishop of the Roman Catholic Archdiocese of San Luis Potosí in Mexico, Jorge Cavazos Arizpe, wrote to the state's governor Ricardo Gallardo Cardona, asking him to cancel the band's appearance at the Potosina National Fair in San Luis Potosí on August 10 "for the sake of society and the sake of all Christians". In response, governor Cardona said the concert would go ahead, saying: "We're [no longer] in the time of the Holy Inquisition to forbid artistic expression." Archbishop Arizpe's request was described by Mexican journalist Rafael Aguilar as a "hypocritical publicity stunt", considering the "scandals involving some priests." Despite the cancellation attempt, the concert went ahead as scheduled, with the band performing to over 205,000 people at the event.

== Set lists ==
Hersheypark Stadium on August 2, 2024
1. "We Know Where You Fucking Live"
2. "Disposable Teens"
3. "Angel With the Scabbed Wings"
4. "This Is the New Shit"
5. "SAY10"
6. "Deep Six"
7. "Tourniquet"
8. "mOBSCENE"
9. "The Dope Show"
10. "Sweet Dreams (Are Made of This)"
11. "The Love Song"
12. "The Beautiful People"
The Fillmore Silver Spring on August 3, 2024
1. "Cruci-Fiction in Space"
2. "Disposable Teens"
3. "Angel with the Scabbed Wings"
4. "SAY10"
5. "This Is the New Shit"
6. "Great Big White World"
7. "Deep Six"
8. "Third Day of a Seven Day Binge"
9. "mOBSCENE"
10. "Tourniquet"
11. "The Dope Show"
12. "As Sick as the Secrets Within"
13. "Sweet Dreams (Are Made of This)"
14. "The Love Song"
15. "The Beautiful People"
16. "Coma White"
Alcatraz on February 11, 2025
1. "Nod If You Understand"
2. "Disposable Teens"
3. "Angel with the Scabbed Wings"
4. "Tourniquet"
5. "Meet Me in Purgatory"
6. "This Is the New Shit"
7. "Death Is Not a Costume"
8. "SAY10"
9. "Raise the Red Flag"
10. "mOBSCENE"
11. "Great Big White World"
12. "The Dope Show"
13. "As Sick as the Secrets Within"
14. "Sweet Dreams (Are Made of This)"
15. "The Love Song"
16. "The Beautiful People"
17. "Coma White"
GLC Live at 20 Monroe on May 2, 2025
1. "Nod If You Understand"
2. "Disposable Teens"
3. "Get Your Gunn"
4. "Tourniquet"
5. "Meet Me in Purgatory"
6. "This Is the New Shit"
7. "The Nobodies"
8. "SAY10"
9. "Sacrilegious"
10. "mOBSCENE"
11. "Long Hard Road Out of Hell"
12. "The Dope Show"
13. "As Sick as the Secrets Within"
14. "Sweet Dreams (Are Made of This)"
15. "The Beautiful People"
16. "Coma White"

== Tour dates ==
† denotes a solo show performed by the band during their co-headlining tour with Five Finger Death Punch.
‡ denotes a festival performance.

List of concerts, showing date, city, country, venue, opening acts and notes
Date	City	Country	Venue	Opening act	Note
Leg 1: North America (with Five Finger Death Punch and Slaughter to Prevail)
August 2, 2024	Hershey	United States	Hersheypark Stadium	The Funeral Portrait	
August 3, 2024	Silver Spring	United States	The Fillmore Silver Spring	The Funeral Portrait	†
August 5, 2024	Holmdel	United States	PNC Bank Arts Center	The Funeral Portrait	
August 7, 2024	Clarkston	United States	Pine Knob Music Theatre	The Funeral Portrait	
August 8, 2024	Cincinnati	United States	Riverbend Music Center	The Funeral Portrait	
August 10, 2024	St. Louis	United States	Hollywood Casino Amphitheatre	The Funeral Portrait	
August 11, 2024	Madison	United States	The Sylvee	The Funeral Portrait	†
August 13, 2024	Rogers	United States	Walmart Arkansas Music Pavilion	The Funeral Portrait	
August 14, 2024	Nashville	United States	Bridgestone Arena	The Funeral Portrait	
August 16, 2024	Noblesville	United States	Ruoff Music Center	The Funeral Portrait	
August 17, 2024	Chicago	United States	Byline Bank Aragon Ballroom	The Funeral Portrait	†
August 19, 2024	Des Moines	United States	Wells Fargo Arena	The Funeral Portrait	
August 21, 2024	Omaha	United States	CHI Health Center	The Funeral Portrait	
August 22, 2024	Denver	United States	Ball Arena	The Funeral Portrait	
August 24, 2024	Calgary	Canada	Grey Eagle Resort & Casino	5¢ Freakshow	†
August 27, 2024	Vancouver	Canada	Rogers Arena	The Funeral Portrait	
August 28, 2024	Tacoma	United States	Temple Theater	The Funeral Portrait	†
August 29, 2024	Spokane	United States	BECU Live at Northern Quest	The Funeral Portrait	
August 31, 2024	Portland	United States	RV Inn Style Resorts Amphitheater	The Funeral Portrait	
September 1, 2024	Reno	United States	Grand Sierra Resort	The Funeral Portrait	†
September 3, 2024	Mountain View	United States	Shoreline Amphitheatre	The Funeral Portrait	
September 4, 2024	Chula Vista	United States	North Island Credit Union Amphitheatre	The Funeral Portrait	
September 6, 2024	Anaheim	United States	Honda Center	The Funeral Portrait	
September 8, 2024	Las Vegas	United States	MGM Grand Garden Arena	The Funeral Portrait	
September 10, 2024	Phoenix	United States	Talking Stick Resort Amphitheatre	The Funeral Portrait	
September 11, 2024	Albuquerque	United States	Isleta Amphitheater	The Funeral Portrait	
September 13, 2024	Durant	United States	Choctaw Grand Theater	The Funeral Portrait	
September 15, 2024	Atlanta	United States	Lakewood Amphitheatre	The Funeral Portrait	
September 16, 2024	Biloxi	United States	Mississippi Coast Coliseum	The Funeral Portrait	
September 18, 2024	Austin	United States	Germania Insurance Amphitheater	The Funeral Portrait	
September 19, 2024	Houston	United States	Cynthia Woods Mitchell Pavilion	The Funeral Portrait	
November 30, 2024 (Note: Machaca Fest 2024)	Monterrey	Mexico	Fundidora Park	‡	
Leg 2: Europe
February 10, 2025	Zurich	Switzerland	Halle 622	The Blackmordia	
February 11, 2025	Milan	Italy	Alcatraz	The Blackmordia	
February 13, 2025	Munich	Germany	Zenith	The Blackmordia	
February 14, 2025	Brno	Czech Republic	Sportovní hala Vodova	The Blackmordia	
February 16, 2025	Berlin	Germany	Columbiahalle	The Blackmordia	
February 19, 2025	Amsterdam	Netherlands	AFAS Live	The Blackmordia	
February 21, 2025	London	England	Eventim Apollo	The Blackmordia	
February 22, 2025	Newcastle upon Tyne	England	O_{2} City Hall	The Blackmordia	
February 23, 2025	Wolverhampton	England	Wolverhampton Civic Hall	The Blackmordia	
Leg 3: South and North America
March 29, 2025 (Note: Festival Vivo x El Rock 2025)	Lima	Peru	Lurin Live	‡	
April 5, 2025 (Note: Arizona Bike Week Festival)	Scottsdale	United States	WestWorld at Scottsdale	‡	
May 2, 2025	Grand Rapids	United States	GLC Live at 20 Monroe	Black Satellite	
May 3, 2025	Gary	United States	Hard Rock Live Northern Indiana	Black Satellite	
May 4, 2025	Detroit	United States	The Fillmore Detroit	Black Satellite	
May 6, 2025	Huntington	United States	The Paramount	Black Satellite	
May 7, 2025	Bethlehem	United States	Wind Creek Event Center	Black Satellite	
May 9, 2025	Philadelphia	United States	The Met	Black Satellite	
May 10, 2025	Boston	United States	Citizen's House of Blues	Black Satellite	
May 12, 2025	Montclair	United States	Wellmont Theater	Black Satellite	
May 13, 2025	Baltimore	United States	Pier Six Pavilion	Black Satellite	
May 15, 2025	Myrtle Beach	United States	House of Blues	Black Satellite	
May 16, 2025	Charlotte	United States	The Fillmore	Black Satellite	
May 18, 2025 (Note: Welcome to Rockville Festival)	Daytona Beach	United States	Daytona International Speedway	‡	
May 20, 2025	Atlanta	United States	Tabernacle	Black Satellite	
May 21, 2025	New Orleans	United States	The Fillmore	Black Satellite	
May 24, 2025 (Note: Buzzfest)	Houston	United States	Cynthia Woods Mitchell Pavilion	‡	
May 25, 2025 (Note: KEGL BFD Festival)	Dallas	United States	Dos Equis Pavilion	‡	
Leg 4: North America and Asia
July 17, 2025 (Note: Hog Fest)	Milwaukee	United States	Fiserv Forum	‡	
July 18, 2025 (Note: Rock Fest)	Cadott	United States	Chippewa Valley Music Festival Grounds	‡	
July 19, 2025 (Note: Inkcarceration Festival)	Mansfield	United States	Ohio State Reformatory	‡	
August 7, 2025 (Note: Sturgis Motorcycle Rally)	Sturgis	United States	Buffalo Chip Campground	‡	
August 10, 2025 (Note: Potosina National Fair)	San Luis Potosí	Mexico	Feria Nacional Potosina	‡	
August 29, 2025 (Note: Rocklahoma Festival)	Pryor	United States	Rockin' Red Dirt Ranch Festival Grounds	‡	
September 3, 2025 (Note: The Unforbidden Festival)	Istanbul	Turkey	Bonus Parkorman	‡	
September 6, 2025 (Note: Park Live Almaty Festival)	Almaty	Kazakhstan	Pervomaysky Ponds	‡	
September 16, 2025	Cleveland	United States	House of Blues	Seven Hours After Violet	
September 18, 2025 (Note: Louder Than Life)	Louisville	United States	Kentucky Exposition Center	‡	
September 20, 2025	Pittsburgh	United States	Roxian Theatre	Seven Hours After Violet	
September 22, 2025	St. Louis	United States	The Pageant	Seven Hours After Violet	
September 23, 2025	Kansas City	United States	Midland Theatre	Seven Hours After Violet	
September 25, 2025	Denver	United States	Fillmore Auditorium	Seven Hours After Violet	
September 27, 2025	Albuquerque	United States	Revel	Seven Hours After Violet	
September 28, 2025	Phoenix	United States	The Van Buren	Seven Hours After Violet	
September 30, 2025	Anaheim	United States	House of Blues	Seven Hours After Violet	
October 1, 2025	San Diego	United States	SOMA San Diego	Seven Hours After Violet	
October 3, 2025	Las Vegas	United States	Pearl Concert Theater	Seven Hours After Violet	
October 5, 2025 (Note: Aftershock Festival)	Sacramento	United States	Discovery Park	‡	
Leg 5: Europe
October 31, 2025	Bournemouth	England	Windsor Hall	Dead Posey	
November 1, 2025	Cardiff	Wales	Utilita Arena Cardiff	Dead Posey	
November 2, 2025	Nottingham	England	Motorpoint Arena	Dead Posey	
November 4, 2025	Manchester	England	O_{2} Apollo	Dead Posey	
November 7, 2025	London	England	OVO Arena Wembley	Dead Posey	
November 9, 2025	Nantes	France	Zénith Nantes	Dead Posey	
November 11, 2025	Paris	France	Zénith Paris	Dead Posey	
November 13, 2025	Antwerp	Belgium	Lotto Arena	Dead Posey	
November 14, 2025	Düsseldorf	Germany	Mitsubishi Electric Halle	Dead Posey	
November 15, 2025	Prague	Czech Republic	Sportovní hala Fortuna	Dead Posey	
November 17, 2025	Berlin	Germany	Max-Schmeling-Halle	Dead Posey	
November 19, 2025	Warsaw	Poland	Torwar Hall	Dead Posey	
November 20, 2025	Leipzig	Germany	Quarterback Immobilien Arena	Dead Posey	
November 22, 2025	Bern	Switzerland	Festhalle Bern	Dead Posey	
November 23, 2025	Grenoble	France	Le Summum	Dead Posey	
November 25, 2025	Bergamo	Italy	ChorusLife Arena	Dead Posey	
November 27, 2025	Barcelona	Spain	Palau Municipal d'Esports de Badalona	Dead Posey	
November 28, 2025	Madrid	Spain	Palacio Vistalegre	Dead Posey	
November 30, 2025	Lisbon	Portugal	Sagres Campo Pequeno	Dead Posey	
Leg #6: North America
December 6, 2025 (Note: Knotfest Mexico)	Monterrey	Mexico	Estadio Banortre	‡	
April 22, 2026	Highland	United States	Yaamava' Theatre	none	
April 23, 2026	Highland	United States	Yaamava' Theatre	none	
April 24, 2026 (Note: Sick New World)	Las Vegas	United States	Las Vegas Festival Grounds	‡	
May 8, 2026	Minneapolis	United States	The Armory	VOWWS	
May 10, 2026	Green Bay	United States	Epic Event Center	VOWWS	
May 12, 2026	Louisville	United States	Palace Theatre	VOWWS	
May 13, 2026	Memphis	United States	Graceland Soundstage	VOWWS	
May 15, 2026	Nashville	United States	The Pinnacle	VOWWS	
May 16, 2026 (Note: Sonic Temple)	Columbus	United States	Historic Crew Stadium	‡	
Leg #7: Europe
July 4, 2026 (Note: Resurrection Fest)	Viveiro	Spain	Plaza Fuente Nueva	‡	
July 5, 2026 (Note: Evil Live Festival)	Lisbon	Portugal	MEO Arena	‡	
July 6, 2026 (Note: Icónica Santalucía Fest)	Seville	Spain	Plaza de España	VOWWS	
July 8, 2026 (Note: Festival de Nîmes)	Nîmes	France	Arena of Nîmes	VOWWS	
July 11, 2026 (Note: Ferrara Summer Festival)	Ferrara	Italy	Piazza Ariostea	VOWWS	
July 13, 2026	Bari	Italy	Fiera del Levante	VOWWS	
July 14, 2026 (Note: Rock in Roma)	Rome	Italy	Parco della Musica	VOWWS	
July 16, 2026	Zagreb	Croatia	Arena Zagreb	VOWWS	
July 18, 2026	Łódź	Poland	Atlas Arena	VOWWS	
July 19, 2026 (Note: Masters of Rock)	Vizovice	Czech Republic	Areál Likérky Rudolf Jelínek	‡	
July 21, 2026 (Note: Metastadt Open Air Festival)	Vienna	Austria	METAstadt	VOWWS	
July 22, 2026 (Note: Budapest Park Festival)	Budapest	Hungary	Budapest Park	VOWWS	
July 24, 2026 (Note: Hills of Rock Festival)	Plovdiv	Bulgaria	Plovdiv Canal	‡	
July 27, 2026 (Note: Rockstadt Extreme Fest)	Ghimbav	Romania	Strada Hermann Oberth	‡	
Leg #8: North America (Freaks on Parade Tour with Rob Zombie)
August 20, 2026	West Palm Beach	United States	iTHINK Financial Amphitheatre	Orgy and The Hu	
August 21, 2026	Tampa	United States	MidFlorida Credit Union Amphitheatre	Orgy and The Hu	
August 23, 2026	Alpharetta	United States	Ameris Bank Amphitheatre	Orgy and The Hu	
August 24, 2026	Charlotte	United States	Truliant Amphitheater	Orgy and The Hu	
August 26, 2026	Holmdel	United States	PNC Bank Arts Center	Orgy and The Hu	
August 27, 2026	Mansfield	United States	Xfinity Center	Orgy and The Hu	
August 29, 2026	Burgettstown	United States	The Pavilion at Star Lake	Orgy and The Hu	
August 30, 2026	Darien Center	United States	Darien Lake Amphitheatre	Orgy and The Hu	
September 1, 2026	Toronto	Canada	RBC Amphitheatre	Orgy and The Hu	
September 2, 2026	Cuyahoga Falls	United States	Blossom Music Center	Orgy and The Hu	
September 4, 2026	Clarkston	United States	Pine Knob Music Theatre	Orgy and The Hu	
September 5, 2026	Tinley Park	United States	Credit Union 1 Amphitheatre	Orgy and The Hu	
September 6, 2026	Noblesville	United States	Ruoff Music Center	Orgy and The Hu	
September 9, 2026	Maryland Heights	United States	Hollywood Casino Amphitheatre	Orgy and The Hu	
September 10, 2026	Kansas City	United States	Morton Amphitheater	Orgy and The Hu	
September 12, 2026	Greenwood Village	United States	Fiddler's Green Amphitheatre	Orgy and The Hu	
September 14, 2026	West Valley City	United States	Utah First Credit Union Amphitheatre	Orgy and The Hu	
September 16, 2026	Airway Heights	United States	BECU Live at Northern Quest	Orgy	
September 17, 2026	Auburn	United States	White River Amphitheatre	Orgy and The Hu	
September 18, 2026	Ridgefield	United States	Cascades Amphitheater	Orgy and The Hu	
September 20, 2026	Concord	United States	Toyota Pavilion at Concord	Orgy and The Hu	
Leg #9: North America
October 15, 2026	New Orleans	United States	The Fillmore	not announced	
October 17, 2026	San Antonio	United States	Aztec Theatre	not announced	
October 18, 2026	San Antonio	United States	Aztec Theatre	not announced	
October 21, 2026	Austin	United States	Emo's	not announced	
October 22, 2026	Austin	United States	Emo's	not announced	
October 24, 2026	Fort Worth	United States	Texas Motor Speedway	‡	
October 31, 2026	Los Angeles	United States	Wiltern Theatre	not announced	
November 1, 2026	Los Angeles	United States	Wiltern Theatre	not announced	

== Canceled dates ==
List of concerts, showing date, city, country, venue, and reason for cancelation
Date	City	Country	Venue	Reason
February 17, 2025	Copenhagen	Denmark	K.B. Hallen	Manson diagnosed with laryngitis
October 29, 2025	Brighton	England	Brighton Centre	Pressure from activists and local authorities.

== Box office data ==
List of box scores, showing date, city, venue, tickets sold compared to the number of available tickets and amount of gross revenue
Date	City	Venue	Attendance / Capacity	Revenue	Ref.
February 21, 2025	London	Eventim Apollo	5,088 / 5,088	$391,785	
