= It's All in Your Head (Eve 6 album) =

It's All In Your Head

Studio album by Eve 6
- Released: July 22, 2003
- Recorded: Autumn–Winter 2002
- Genres: Post-grunge; punk rock; alternative rock
- Length: 44:36
- Label: RCA
- Producer: Gregg Wattenberg

Eve 6 chronology
Horrorscope (2000)	It's All In Your Head (2003)	Speak in Code (2012)

Singles from It's All In Your Head
- 1. "Think Twice" Released: May 27, 2003; 2. "At Least We're Dreaming" Released: October 22, 2003

Professional ratings
Aggregate scores
Source	Rating
Metacritic	58/100
Review scores
Source	Rating
AllMusic	3/5 stars
Alternative Press	3/5
Blender	2/5 stars
E!	C−
Entertainment Weekly	C
Rolling Stone	2/5 stars

It's All in Your Head is the third studio album by American rock band Eve 6. The album was released on July 22, 2003 through RCA.

== Background ==
Released right before they were dropped from RCA Records and subsequently went on hiatus in 2004. Although the album is praised by fans, it is considered an experimental album, which may explain the lackluster sales that led to the band's release from their RCA contract. The first single, "Think Twice", was a hit on alternative rock radio stations. The second single, "At Least We're Dreaming", highlighted a darker side of Eve 6. "Girlfriend" was intended to be the third single from the album, but Eve 6 was released from their contract with RCA before an official release.

The album art for It's All in Your Head, a headless man raising his arms, derives from a wood etching done by a friend of Max Collins. None of the design is computerized and is all from wood etchings.

== Track listing ==
All lyrics are written by Max Collins; all music is composed by Eve 6.

No.	Title	Length
1.	"Without You Here"	2:23
2.	"Think Twice"	3:43
3.	"At Least We're Dreaming"	4:08
4.	"Still Here Waiting"	2:17
5.	"Good Lives"	4:26
6.	"Hey Montana"	5:03
7.	"Bring the Night On"	3:31
8.	"Friend of Mine"	3:33
9.	"Girlfriend"	4:11
10.	"Not Gonna Be Alone Tonight"	3:46
11.	"Hokis"	3:31
12.	"Arch Drive Goodbye"	4:04
Total length:		44:36

Japanese Bonus Track
No.	Title	Length
13.	"Velociraptor"	3:51

EVE6MediaHQ exclusive digital download

No.	Title	Length
1.	"405"	4:17
2.	"Bring the Night On" (Demo)	3:18
3.	"Burning Out"	3:55
4.	"Not Gonna Be Alone Tonight" (Demo)	3:47
5.	"Still Here Waiting" (Demo)	2:05

== Personnel ==
- Max Collins – bass, lead vocals
- Jon Siebels – guitar, backing vocals
- Tony Fagenson – drums

Additional

- David Campbell – String arrangements on "Girlfriend"
- Joel Derouin — Violin
- Charlie Bisharat — Violin
- Mario DeLeon — Violin
- Natalie Leggett — Violin
- Sara Parkins — Violin
- Mark Robertson — Violin
- Bob Becker — Viola
- Denyse Buffum — Viola
- Suzie Katayama — Cello, contractor
- Steve Richards — Cello

== Singles ==
Year	Single	Chart	Position
2003	"Think Twice"	US Alternative Airplay (Billboard)	9

== Charts ==
Chart performance for It's All in Your Head
Chart (2003)	Peak position
US Billboard 200	27
