= Victoria (Eve 6 song) =

Single by Eve 6

from the album Speak in Code
- Released: February 28, 2012
- Recorded: 2011
- Genre: Alternative rock
- Length: 3:15
- Label: Fearless Records
- Songwriter: Max Collins

Eve 6 singles chronology
"At Least We're Dreaming" (2003)	"Victoria" (2012)	"Curtain" (2012)

"Victoria" is a song by American rock band Eve 6. It was released February 28, 2012, as the first single from their comeback album Speak in Code. The song impacted radio on March 20, 2012.

== Background ==
The song premiered February 27, 2012, as their comeback single (Lost & Found was released a month prior as a preview track from the album).

== Charts ==
Chart (2012)	Peak position
US Alternative Airplay (Billboard)	25

== Release history ==
Region	Date	Format	Label
United States	March 19, 2012	Modern rock radio	Fearless Records
