= Eve 6 (album) =

Studio album by Eve 6
- Released: April 28, 1998
- Recorded: 1997
- Studios: Sound City Studios, Van Nuys, California, Chomsky Ranch, Hollywood, California, Stepping Stone, Seattle, Washington
- Genres: Alternative rock; power pop
- Length: 38:17
- Label: RCA
- Producer: Don Gilmore

Eve 6 chronology
Eleventeen (1996)	Eve 6 (1998)	Horrorscope (2000)

Singles from Eve 6
- 1. "Inside Out" Released: May 1998; 2. "Leech" Released: 1998; 3. "Superhero Girl" Released: 1998; 4. "Open Road Song" Released: 1999; 5. "Tongue Tied" Released: 1999

Professional ratings
Review scores
Source	Rating
AllMusic	4/5 stars
The Rolling Stone Album Guide	2.5/5 stars

Eve 6 is the debut studio album by American alternative rock band Eve 6. The album was produced by Don Gilmore and released on April 28, 1998, by RCA Records.

== Reception ==
"Inside Out" quickly rose to the number 1 spot on the Modern Rock charts and topping Billboard's Heatseekers new artists chart. It went platinum, receiving a boost from MTV play of videos for "Inside Out" and "Leech". A video was also made for "Tongue Tied", which featured a young Katie Holmes and Marisa Coughlan from the film Teaching Mrs. Tingle.

== Track listing ==
All lyrics are written by Max Collins except "Leech" co-written with Jon Siebels; all music is composed by Eve 6.

No.	Title	Length
1.	"How Much Longer"	3:06
2.	"Inside Out"	3:39
3.	"Leech"	3:59
4.	"Showerhead"	3:03
5.	"Open Road Song"	3:15
6.	"Jesus Nitelite"	4:48
7.	"Superhero Girl"	3:36
8.	"Tongue Tied"	3:11
9.	"Saturday Night"	2:50
10.	"There's a Face"	2:38
11.	"Small Town Trap"	4:19
Total length:		38:17

Japanese edition bonus tracks
No.	Title	Length
12.	"Open Road Song" (acoustic version)	3:36
13.	"Inside Out" (acoustic version)	3:43
Total length:		45:36

== Personnel ==
=== Performance ===
- Don Gilmore – background vocals
- Max Collins – bass guitar, vocals
- Tony Fagenson – drums, percussion
- Jonathan Siebels – guitar, background vocals

=== Technical ===
- Don Gilmore – producer, engineer, mixer
- Stephen Marcussen – mastering
- Don C. Taylor – digital editing
- Billy Bowers – assistant engineer
- John Burton – assistant engineer
- Zach Belica – assistant engineer
- John Seymour – assistant engineer
- Doug Trantow – assistant engineer
- Jason Martin – artist development
- Jonathan Rosen – illustrations
- Brett Kilroe – art direction
- Julie Bruzzone – artist development

== Charts ==
=== Weekly charts ===
Chart (1998)	Peak position
Canada Top Albums/CDs (RPM)	70
US Billboard 200	33
US Heatseekers Albums (Billboard)	1

=== Year-end charts ===
Chart (1998)	Position
US Billboard 200	125
Chart (1999)	Position
US Billboard 200	147

== Certifications ==
Region	Certification	Certified units/sales
United States (RIAA)	Platinum	1,000,000^{^}
^{^} Shipments figures based on certification alone.
