= Horrorscope (Eve 6 album) =

Studio album by Eve 6
- Released: July 25, 2000
- Recorded: 1999–2000
- Studios: NRG Recording Studios, North Hollywood, California
- Genres: Pop rock; alternative rock
- Length: 41:04
- Label: RCA
- Producer: Don Gilmore

Eve 6 chronology
Eve 6 (1998)	Horrorscope (2000)	It's All in Your Head (2003)

Singles from Horrorscope
- 1. "Promise" Released: May 23, 2000; 2. "On the Roof Again" Released: 2000; 3. "Here's to the Night" Released: March 6, 2001

Horrorscope is the second studio album by American rock band Eve 6. It was recorded at NRG Recording Studios in North Hollywood, California. The album was influenced by Lit's A Place in the Sun (1999). It was released on July 25, 2000, through RCA Records.

== Singles ==
The first single, "Promise", was a hit on alternative rock radio, reaching #3 on the US Modern Rock Tracks chart and #25 on the Mainstream Rock Tracks chart. Around this time, "On the Roof Again" made it to #19 on the Modern Rock Tracks chart. The follow-up single, "Here's to the Night" was a major mainstream hit in 2001, reaching #30 on the Billboard Hot 100. "Here's to the Night" became a hit at senior proms and graduation parties.

== Critical reception ==
Professional ratings
Aggregate scores
Source	Rating
Metacritic	(53/100)
Review scores
Source	Rating
AllMusic	3/5 stars
The A.V. Club	(unfavorable)
Drowned in Sound	8/10
Entertainment Weekly	B−
Rolling Stone	2.5/5 stars
Spin	(2/10)
Sputnikmusic	4/5 stars
Wall of Sound	(81/100)

Horrorscope was met with "mixed or average" reviews from critics. At Metacritic, which assigns a weighted average rating out of 100 to reviews from mainstream publications, this release received an average score of 53 based on 10 reviews.

In a review for AllMusic, critic reviewer MacKenzie Wilson said: "It's another conventional rock record with thrashing guitar hooks and throbbing basslines firmly in place, but frontman Max Collins has lyrically improved. There isn't anything intellectually impressive and the hyperactive little boy excitement is still present, but a lush sweet side also shines through the album." David Hiltbrand of Entertainment Weekly wrote "the band's music and lyrics often still sound labored."

== Commercial performance ==
The album was certified Gold by the RIAA in the U.S., and also by the CRIA in Canada in 2001.

== Track listing ==
All lyrics are written by Max Collins except "Jet Plane" by John Denver; all music is composed by Eve 6 except "Jet Plane" by Denver.

No.	Title	Length
1.	"Rescue"	3:56
2.	"Promise"	2:56
3.	"On the Roof Again"	3:05
4.	"Sunset Strip Bitch"	3:18
5.	"Here's to the Night"	4:09
6.	"Amphetamines"	2:46
7.	"Enemy"	3:48
8.	"Nocturnal"	3:07
9.	"Jet Pack"	3:33
10.	"Nightmare"	3:07
11.	"Bang"	3:34
12.	"Girl Eyes"	3:45
Total length:		41:04

Japanese Bonus Track
No.	Title	Length
13.	"Jet Plane" (John Denver cover)	2:54
Total length:		43:58

== Personnel ==
- Max Collins – bass, lead vocals
- Jon Siebels – guitar, backing vocals
- Tony Fagenson – drums

Additional

- David Campbell – String arrangements on "Here's to the Night"

== Charts ==
Chart performance for Horrorscope
Chart (2000)	Peak position
Canada Top Albums/CDs (RPM)	26
US Billboard 200	34

== Certifications ==
Region	Certification	Certified units/sales
Canada (Music Canada)	Gold	50,000^{^}
United States (RIAA)	Gold	500,000^{^}
^{^} Shipments figures based on certification alone.
