= Fagenson =

Fagenson is a surname. Notable people with the surname include:

- Don Fagenson (born 1952), better known as Don Was, American musician, record producer, and record executive
- Tony Fagenson (born 1978), American guitarist, producer, songwriter, and multi-instrumentalist
