= Millie Earl =

British Liberal Democrat politician

Councillor Millie Earl

Leader of Bournemouth, Christchurch and Poole Council
- Incumbent
- Assumed office 14 July 2024
- Preceded by: Vikki Slade

Councillor for Newtown and Heatherlands
- Incumbent
- Assumed office 2 May 2019

Personal details
- Born: 1990 or 1991 (aged 36 or 35) Poole, Dorset, England
- Party: Liberal Democrats

Millie Clementine Earl (born 1990 or 1991) is a British Liberal Democrat politician who has served as the leader of Bournemouth, Christchurch and Poole Council since 2024.

== Early life ==
Millie was born in Poole and grew up on Ashley Road.

== Career ==
Earl is a veteran campaigner working with charities like Dorset Wildlife Trust and the Bournemouth Foodbank. In the 2015 Poole Borough Council election, she was a Liberal Democrat candidate in Creekmoor ward but was not elected.

In the 2019 Bournemouth, Christchurch and Poole Council election, she was elected in Newtown and Heatherlands. In the 2023 Bournemouth, Christchurch and Poole Council election, she was re-elected in her ward topping the poll with 1,966 votes. In the election the Liberal Democrats became the largest party and took control of the council holding the most seats. The Liberal Democrats formed a coalition with Christchurch Independents, Poole People Party and the Bournemouth Independent Group. Earl was appointed Deputy Council Leader with the portfolio of "Connected Communities". In 2023, Earl was awarded the Belinda Eyre-Brook Award at the Liberal Democrat Conference in Bournemouth.

In the 2024 United Kingdom general election, council leader Vikki Slade was elected Member of Parliament (MP) for Mid Dorset and North Poole, so Earl took over as interim council leader. When the council reconvened she was elected. She became the fifth council leader in five years. As council leader she has been responsible in negotiations surrounding the future of the Bournemouth Air Festival. In September 2024, the "Best Value Notice" the Government put on BCP Council was lifted with Earl saying the council was in a "much healthier place".

As council leader she launched a consultation on new parish and town councils, despite there being overwhelming opposition from local residents and major concerns around the increased costs to tax payers, Earl and the Lib Dem led BCP council decided to press on regardless, choosing to ignore these concerns. In April 2025, she cut the ribbon at the new soft play facility at Kings Park Leisure and Learning Centre in Boscombe. In June 2025, Earl called for the cancellation of a planned concert in Bournemouth by the American musician Marilyn Manson for his One Assassination Under God Tour. This was due to the allegations made by actress Evan Rachel Wood. On 24 June 2025, BCP Council was won Senior Leadership Team of the Year at the Municipal Journal (MJ) Local Government Achievement Awards. Earl said "this award is real recognition for the remarkable work BCP Council does despite facing significant and unique challenges".

In July 2025, she warned that BCP Council was under "imminent financial threat" over increased demand for SEND services. The council has taken on debt to pay for those demands. Earl wrote a letter to Deputy Prime Minister of the United Kingdom Angela Rayner asking for further SEND support. In September 2025, she opened the Liberal Democrat Conference in Bournemouth alongside MP Vikki Slade. In May 2026, she was a candidate for Poole Town Council in Newtown. She was defeated by Reform UK. On 3 November 2026, the opposition Conservatives tabled a motion of no confidence in her leadership before full council meets on 8 December.

== Political views ==
Earl supported the use of "hybrid and online participation" for council meetings. During the COVID-19 pandemic Earl helped organise a community festival in Parkstone. She presented a petition on measures to prevent anti-social behaviour in her ward. The petition entitled "Make Ashley Road Safe" was drawn up following a number of incidents in the area. Earl has advocated the government allowing councils to levy a tourist tax. In order to repurpose vacant town centre properties the council introduced a High Street Rental Auction scheme. She has been a critic of Reform UK. She supported the expansion of the JPMorgan Chase campus in Littledown. As council leader Earl has promoted a residents card scheme. The BCP Life programme launched on 27 August 2026. The card enables perks and discounts for local residents including parking.

Earl opposed Conservative proposals to enforce Public Spaces Protection Orders (PSPO) which included fining homeless people in the local authority, calling the policy "very cruel". Earl supports devolution but was critical of the English Devolution Bill proposed by the Labour government which offered a devolution deal and metro mayor for the region. Following a council vote, it was decided that the unitary authority would join the Heart of Wessex Combined Authority instead of Hampshire and Solent, in which Earl described as the "best option". After the government did not proceed with the plans, Earl advocated for a devolved mayor for the Wessex region alongside leaders in Dorset, Wiltshire and Somerset.
