= Fitness (band) =

American rock band

- Origin: Los Angeles, California, U.S.
- Genres: Rock, alternative rock, synth-pop
- Years active: 2016–2020
- Labels: Killphonic; No Smoke Management
- Formerly of: Awolnation
- Members: Max Collins; Kenny Carkeet
- Website: https://www.fitnesswastaken.com

Fitness was an American synth-rock duo based in Los Angeles, California. It consisted of Max Collins, from Eve 6, and Kenny Carkeet, formerly from Awolnation. Ben Hilzinger was their accompanying drummer.

== History ==
Max Collins and Kenny Carkeet originally first met at a music festival in upstate New York in 2012. Fitness was formed in late 2016. In March 2017, Carkeet announced that he would be leaving Awolnation to spend more time with Fitness.

In late 2016 and early 2017, Fitness released two stand-alone singles: "Get Dead" and "Supafeeler (Vice Grip)." The next single the band released was "Feel The Weight," on April 14, 2017. Another single, "I Don't Feel Anything" was released on August 24, 2017. Their debut EP, Aggroculture, was announced on the same day and was released on September 15, 2017. The title of the EP is a portmanteau of "aggro", which is a slang term meaning aggravation or aggression, and "culture".

On February 2, 2018, they released the single Matter of Time, with a music video on the same day. Max Collins once said that the song "Matter of Time", like the phrase "it's just a matter of time" itself, can have a positive or negative connotation depending on how the person looks at it. A remix of the song by Matthew Koma was released on August 27, 2018. Koma also makes a cameo appearance in the song's music video.

The band's debut album, Karate, was released on June 29, 2018. Although they did not upload the audio of their songs on their YouTube channel, the audio was instead uploaded by SoulSpazm14. IndieCentralMusic described it as a "kick-ass album." Fitness then began touring with Wild Moccasins and Kongos in mid-late 2018. On January 9, 2019, the band released a lyric video for "Cold Rain" on their YouTube channel.

On May 2, 2019, they released a single called "AMEN!!," with a music video on the same day. Over the course of the next few months, they released several other singles: "Yellowjackets", "High", and "Dirty Work". They also embarked on another tour with Kongos from October 1 to October 16. They released three new songs on March 27, 2020, including "Keep It Good", the lead single to their upcoming EP. The EP, titled Opera Cadaver, was released on April 10, 2020. The band did not go on tour, most likely because of COVID-19 pandemic, though they did not make an official statement.

Since the release of Opera Cadaver, the band has been inactive, as Max Collins has returned his focus to Eve 6.

== Musical styles ==
Fitness's sound has been best described as alternative rock and aggressive synth-pop. All-Access Music has described the project as a "middle finger to convention and expectations."

== Band name ==
The band chose the name Fitness because it makes them intentionally difficult to search for on the internet. The band does not want to be popular, as their focus is on simply having fun.

There is also an unrelated Canadian band from Edmonton called Fitness.

== Personnel ==
=== Main ===
- Max Collins (lead vocals, bass)
- Kenny Carkeet (backing vocals, guitar, synthesizers)

=== Touring member ===
- Ben Hilzinger (drums)

== Discography ==
=== Studio albums ===
- Karate (2018)

=== EPs ===
- Aggroculture (2017)
- Opera Cadaver (2020)

=== Singles ===
Song title	Release date	Album
"Get Dead"	Dec 11, 2016	Non-album singles
"Supafeeler (Vice Grip)"	Jan 20, 2017	Non-album singles
"Feel the Weight"	Apr 14, 2017	Aggroculture
"I Don't Feel Anything"	Aug 25, 2017	Aggroculture
"Matter of Time"	Feb 2, 2018	Karate
"Cold Rain"	Jun 25, 2018	Karate
"AMEN!!"	May 2, 2019	Non-album singles
"Yellowjackets"	Jul 26, 2019	Non-album singles
"High"	Sep 30, 2019	Non-album singles
"Dirty Work"	Dec 5, 2019	Non-album singles
"Keep It Good"	Mar 27, 2020	Opera Cadaver
"Anvil"	Mar 27, 2020	Opera Cadaver
"A Way to Be Saved"	Mar 27, 2020	Non-album single
