= Dead Posey =

American rock band

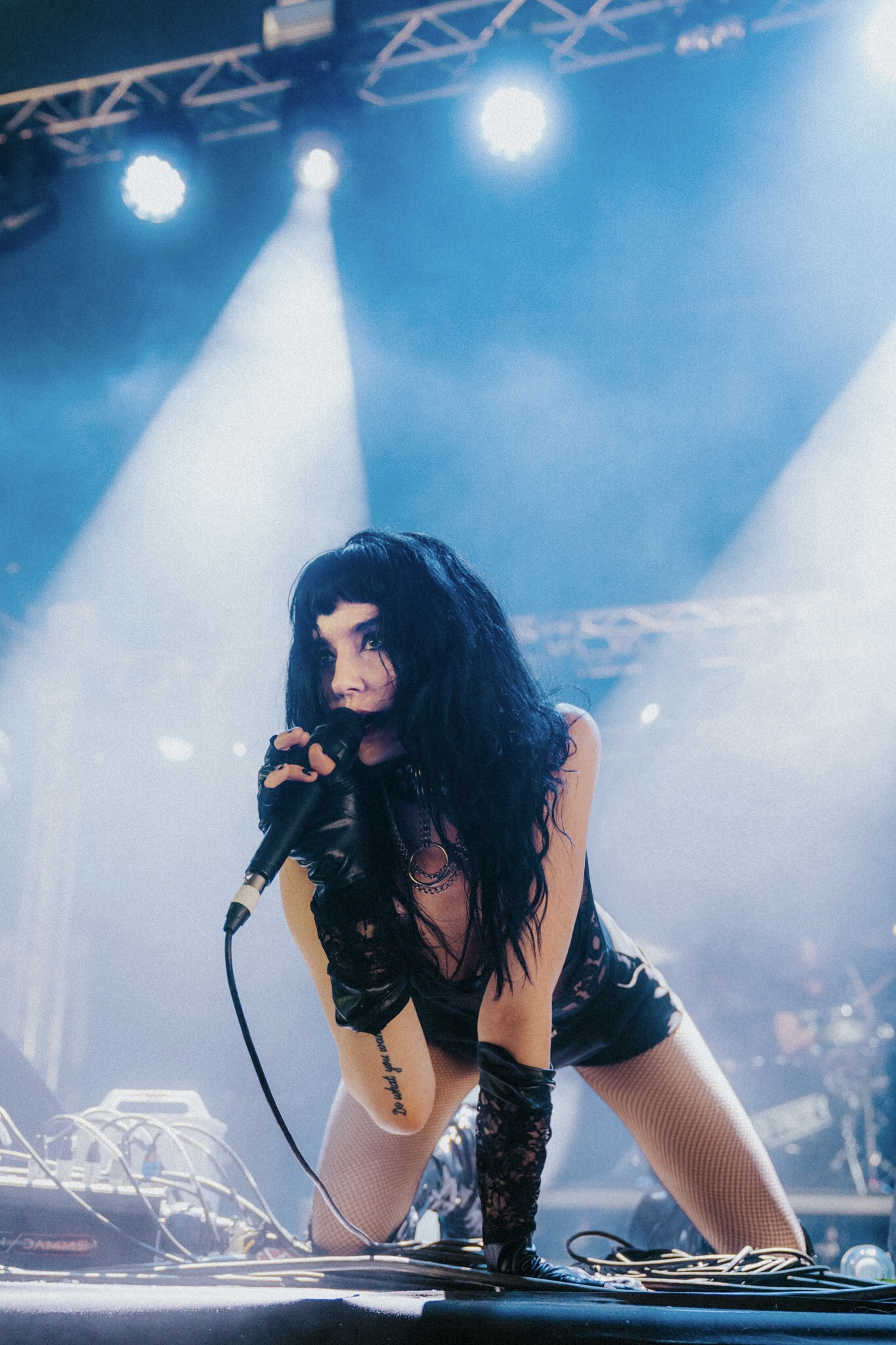
- Danyell Souza with Dead Posey at Download Festival 2022

Background information
- Origin: Los Angeles, California
- Genres: Alternative rock, alternative metal, industrial rock, garage rock revival, gothic rock
- Years active: 2016–present
- Label: Sumerian Position Music
- Members: Danyell Souza, Tony Fagenson
- Website: www.deadposey.com

Dead Posey is an American rock band founded in Los Angeles, California by lead singer Danyell Souza and guitarist/multi-instrumentalist Tony Fagenson also known as Tony Nova former drummer of Eve 6.

The band started releasing music independently in 2016 and signed a publishing deal with Position Music soon after. On August 27, 2018, Dead Posey signed to rock/metal label Sumerian Records and released three EP's with the label: Freak Show, Malfunction, and Malfunction X Broken Down.

Dead Posey released their debut album Are You in a Cult? on October 18, 2024, via Position Music. Ahead of the album, the band received radio play with singles, "Welcome to the Nightmare" and "Can't Take Me Down", which debuted on Kerrang! Radio's Fresh Blood hosted by Alex Baker and were The Featured Artist Of The Week. Dead Posey's single She Went Bad was also featured on SiriusXM Octane Test Drive with host Jose Mangin.

The band has played notable festivals Download, Louder Than Life, Aftershock, Shiprocked, MadCool Festival summer 2024 as well as toured with bands such as Theory of a Deadman, Palaye Royale, Bones UK, Sophie Lloyd, Through Fire, The Birthday Massacre, and in November 2025 joined Marilyn Manson on his One Assassination Under God UK/EU tour as direct support. In addition Dead Posey underwent their first headlining club tour "The Damned & The Dead Tour" in both the US & UK/EU in 2025.

Dead Posey's music has been featured in numerous television shows such as Syfy's Wynonna Earp, Fox's Lucifer, MTV's Teen Wolf, Marvel's Cloak & Dagger, CBS's Fire Country, Netflix's Jack Whitehall: Travels With My Father and The Most Hated Man on the Internet. Ads for Taco Bell, Sony PlayStation, Back 4 Blood, and Riot Games’ League of Legends have also featured their music. In 2019 the bands song "Don't Stop the Devil" was the theme song for WWE's Elimination Chamber.

Dead Posey has received positive write-ups from the likes of Spin, Guitar World and Kerrang! Magazine. Loudwire featured the band's single "Can't Take Me Down" among best rock and metal songs. They collaborated with Hot Topic on their "I Like Scary Movies Experience" feature. Podcasts such as The Boo Crew, The Fred Minnick Show, and She Will Rock You have interviewed them.

== Influences ==
The band has cited Garbage, Nine Inch Nails, The Kills, Nirvana, Hole, Marilyn Manson, Depeche Mode, Rob Zombie, and PJ Harvey as musical influences and David Lynch, Edgar Allan Poe and Salvador Dalí, as artistic influences.
