= Max Collins (musician) =

American musician

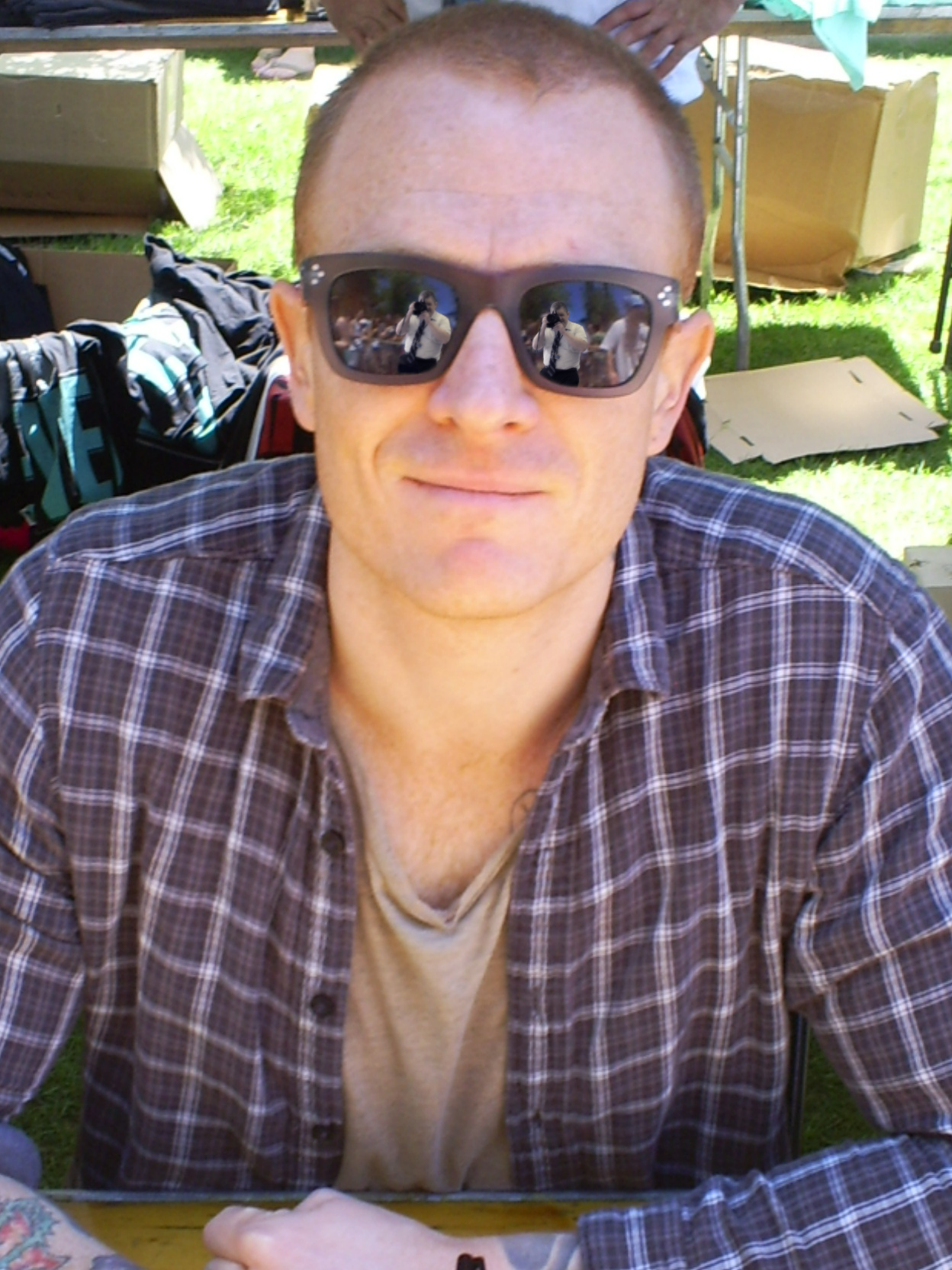
- Collins in 2012

Background information
- Born: James Maxwell Stuart Collins; August 28, 1978 (age 48)
- Occupations: Musician; producer; songwriter
- Instruments: Vocals; bass; guitar; piano
- Years active: 1995–present
- Label: RCA
- Member of: Eve 6
- Formerly of: Brotherhood of Lost Dogs; The Sugi Tap; Fitness
- Spouse: Victoria Misirli (m. 2007; sep. 2019)

James Maxwell Stuart Collins (born August 28, 1978) is an American musician, best known as the lead vocalist, primary songwriter, and bassist of the alternative rock band Eve 6, which he co-founded with Jon Siebels. In 2013, he launched a solo career as Marms + The Car Deaths. Collins has other musical projects, including the band Fitness. More recently, he has created a singing Germanic alter-ego, Chevy Mustang.

== Career ==
Max Collins (bass, lead vocals), Jon Siebels (guitar, backing vocals), and Nick Meyers (drums) formed a band in 1995 in La Crescenta, California, first known as Yakoo and then Eleventeen; the name Eve 6 was adopted later.^{[1]}

The band issued the self-titled Eve 6 in 1998, attaining platinum success with hit singles "Inside Out" and "Leech," the former capturing the #1 spot on the Modern Rock charts and crossing over successfully to pop/Top 40 radio. More widespread recognition came with gold-selling sophomore effort Horrorscope (1999), with songs "Promise," "On the Roof Again", and Top 40 hit "Here's to the Night".

From mid-2004 until May 2005, Collins performed in the band Brotherhood of Lost Dogs with Fountains of Wayne drummer Brian Young and bassist Joe "Bass" Howard, formerly of The Posies. They played live shows in the Los Angeles area but never released any recorded material. In June 2005, Collins began a new project, The Sugi Tap, with former Eve 6 bandmember Tony Fagenson. In October 2007, The Sugi Tap was put on hold "indefinitely". The band had released an EP, formerly available at The Sugi Tap's website; now, only the album art of the EP and a link to Eve 6's Myspace page is available.

Collins primarily plays Fender Jazz Basses. As of October 2007, Eve 6 officially said that they are returning, minus Jon Siebels, who was replaced by a temporary guitarist, Matt Bair of The Sequel. As of July 2011, Eve 6 has reunited, with all three original members returning. Their fourth studio album, Speak in Code, was released on April 24, 2012.

In early 2013, Collins began a barrage of songwriting, which launched his solo career. With the support of fans, he fully funded his album Honey from the Ice Box in an online campaign through PledgeMusic. On September 6, 2013, the digital version of the album was released early for his PledgeMusic supporters. In 2015, he collaborated with Pegboard Nerds, providing vocals for their track "Pink Cloud."

Collins started a new project, Fitness, with Eve 6 bandmate Ben Hilzinger and Kenny Carkeet of Awolnation. In 2020, Collins launched his alter-ego, "Chevy Mustang", a complex artist/self-styled guru with a Germanic-sounding accent and a following of students whom he refers to as disciples. Chevy Mustang's first single was "Because I Want To", seemingly in response to the limitations of COVID restrictions. In June 2020, the next Chevy Mustang single, "Can I Be Your Friend", featured Evan Rachel Wood, and a version of this song became an electronic birthday card option at JibJab on August 31, 2020.

From April to September 2022, Collins wrote an advice column named "Heart in a Blender" for the Input section of the online magazine Inverse, covering various topics such as mental health, toxic family members, and drug use. As of November 2022, he relaunched the advice column on BuzzFeed News and is also working on a book with the same name, due in 2023.

In 2025, it was announced Collins will be playing bass for Fountains of Wayne on a set of festival shows later in the year.

== Personal life ==
On July 21, 2007, Collins married Victoria Misirli. Collins announced the birth of his daughter Isla (pronounced eye-la) Elizabeth Collins who was born on July 11, 2014. Collins' second daughter, Zia (pronounced zee-a) Victoria, was born on November 4, 2016. He and Misirli separated in 2019.

He is the nephew of former actor Stephen Collins. His brother was in a band, Controlling the Famous. In December 2020, multiple media outlets took note of the fact that Collins had become a prolific poster to Eve 6's official Twitter account, which was "quickly becoming a trove of internet comedy," including queries to various public figures asking if they "like the heart in a blender song," "choice tidbits ... about his fellow washed stars," and "generic observations about wallet chains, weight gain, and merch with palm trees on it, as well as a running bit about not knowing the difference between Vertical Horizon, Dishwalla, Matchbox 20, et al." Loudwire crowned Collins the "new king of Twitter" and "the anti-Trapt of Twitter," the latter contrasting Collins' celebrated output with that of Trapt lead singer Chris Taylor Brown.

== Indecent exposure incident ==
On May 26, 2003, Collins was cited for indecent exposure after employees at a Crowne Plaza hotel reported him walking around the hotel naked.

== Discography ==
For Collins' work with Eve 6, see Eve 6 discography.

=== Studio albums ===
- Honey from the Icebox (2014)
