= Black Satellite =

American rock band

- Origin: New York City, New York
- Genres: Industrial metal; Industrial rock; Alternative rock; Alternative metal
- Years active: 2017-present
- Members: Larissa Vale, Kyle Hawken
- Website: https://blacksatellite.com/

Black Satellite is an American rock band from New York City, New York, led by vocalist Larissa Vale and guitarist Kyle Hawken

Following the release of their single Valkyrie in April 2017, Black Satellite was booked as support for Starset during their 2017 Vessels tour. Their follow-up single Blind premiered on idobi radio on May 11, 2017. Their debut album Endless was released on July 7, 2017. In January 2018, the band was named one of Alternative Press' "12 Bands You Need To Know", and they released two covers of songs by Type O Negative as a tribute to late vocalist Peter Steele on April 14 of that year. Black Satellite announced their second studio album Aftermath with the release of a new single Void on August 14, 2020, mixed by Ben Grosse. The band was scheduled to tour with Fozzy, Through Fire, and Royal Bliss on the Save The World Tour in 2020. In 2021, they toured with Nita Strauss.

== Discography ==
=== Studio albums ===
- Endless (2017)
- Aftermath (2025)

=== Singles ===
- "I Don't Wanna Be Me" (April 14, 2018)
- "My Girlfriend's Girlfriend" (April 14, 2018)
- "Void" (August 14, 2020)
- "Sonne" (July 28, 2021)
- "Broken" (March 3, 2023)
- "Downfall" (May 7, 2025)
- "Kill For You" (Sep 4, 2025)
