= Pervomaysky, Kazakhstan =

Pervomayskiy
- Village
- Location in Kazakhstan
- Coordinates: 43°22′25″N 76°56′24″E
- Country: Kazakhstan
- Region: Almaty
- Time zone: UTC+6 (Omsk Time)

Pervomayskiy (Kazakh: Pervomaıskıı, Russian: Первомайский) is a settlement in the city of Almaty (previously in Almaty Region), in south-eastern Kazakhstan.
