= Come with Me Now =

Single by Kongos

from the album Lunatic
- Released: July 31, 2012
- Recorded: 2011
- Genre: Alternative rock; kwaito
- Length: 3:31
- Label: Tokoloshe; Epic; Rock All Night Productions LLC
- Songwriters: Johnny Kongos; Dylan Kongos
- Producer: Kongos

Kongos singles chronology
"I'm Only Joking" (2011)	"Come with Me Now" (2012)	"I Want to Know" (2012)

Music video
- "Come with Me Now" on YouTube

"Come with Me Now" is a song by South African American band Kongos. Initially released to iTunes in December 2012 as a single from their album Lunatic, "Come with Me Now" earned commercial success in the United States in 2014, eventually peaking at number one on the Billboard Alternative Songs chart and becoming their first charting single in the United States.

== Background and release ==
Kongos first uploaded the song to YouTube on September 27, 2011. In 2012, they released their album Lunatic. With the band performing the song live while opening for American band Linkin Park in South Africa, "Come with Me Now" was considered a fan favorite there though it initially struggled to find an audience in the United States. The band admitted that when "it didn't seem like things were getting along we really lost heart – we were ready to move on to new material".

In early January 2014, the song began receiving airplay in the US, generating major label attention for the band which was eventually signed to Epic Records. It was released to US contemporary hit radio on 15 April 2014. The song appears on the soundtrack of the movie The Expendables 3.

The song was released in the UK as the lead single off Lunatic on August 17, 2014.

== Composition ==
"Come with Me Now" has been described by Billboard as an "accordion-tinged" rock song. Members of the band themselves say that the song is heavily influenced by kwaito music, which is described as being a blend of South African jazz, township pop, and Western house music. It was written by keyboard/accordion player Johnny Kongos and singer/bassist Dylan Kongos.

== Commercial performance ==
On April 9, 2014, "Come with Me Now" debuted at number 98 on the Billboard Hot 100, making it their first charting single on the chart; it peaked at number 31. It also topped the Billboard Alternative Songs chart. By reaching the summit of the chart in 10 weeks, it was the quickest song of a rookie band to top the chart since American rock band Evanescence's 2003 song "Bring Me to Life". The single peaked at number 4 on the Billboard Hot Rock Songs chart and number 7 on the Canadian Hot 100. The song has sold 1.3 million copies in the United States, as of December 2014. The single also peaked at number 14, number 16, and number 18 on the Mainstream Rock Tracks, Mainstream Top 40 and Adult Top 40 charts, respectively. The song also topped the Official South African Singles Chart and peaked in the top 40 in New Zealand. It has sold over 160,000 copies in Canada.

== Music video ==
The music video for "Come with Me Now" was uploaded on July 31, 2012. The video includes footage of the band playing the song, intercut with looped shots of people performing other activities such as applying makeup, exercising, and flipping through a magazine before they fall into water.

== Live performances ==
The band performed the song on Jimmy Kimmel Live! on 5 March 2014.

== Personnel ==
- Dylan Kongos – Lead vocals, bass guitar, Lap steel guitar
- John J. Kongos – Accordion, keyboards, vocoder, vocals
- Jesse Kongos – Drums, percussion, vocals
- Daniel Kongos – Guitar, vocals

== Use in popular culture ==
- "Come with Me Now" has been used in commercials for TV shows, theme parks and networks including The Grand Tour, The Originals, NBC Sports, MSNBC, Syfy, Hemlock Grove, HBO's 2014 summer programming lineup, CNN, National Geographic Channel Philippines, History Channel (South Africa), NCIS: New Orleans, the Spike TV app, Universal Orlando Resort and Running Wild with Bear Grylls.
- The song was used in the "50 Cameos segment" to kick off the 2014 MTV Movie Awards hosted by Conan O'Brien.
- "Come with Me Now" was the official theme song for WWE's May 2014 pay-per-view Extreme Rules.
- The song was also used for televised sporting events, including the 2013 Rose Bowl, 2013 Orange Bowl and games for the 2014 NCAA Division I baseball tournament. It was used as an unofficial theme song for the 2015 Copa América.
- The song appeared in the trailer for the films Holy Motors and Horrible Bosses 2.
- The song was featured in Season 1 Episode 13 The Crescent City of supernatural tv show The Originals.
- The song was featured in the 2014 NASCAR on Fox season, Tampa Bay Lightning's 2014–15 season and during the pregame of Game 7 of the 2014 World Series.
- The song was featured in the BBC Sport "Get Carried Away with the Cup" campaign, promoting the return of coverage of the FA Cup to the broadcaster.
- The song appeared in the "Last Hope" trailer for the video game Borderlands: The Pre-Sequel.
- The song appeared in the film The Expendables 3, the TV show CSI: Crime Scene Investigation, season 15, episode 1 and the video game Guitar Hero Live.

== Charts ==
=== Weekly charts ===
Weekly chart performance for "Come with Me Now"
Chart (2014–2016)	Peak position
Australia (ARIA)	94
Austria (Ö3 Austria Top 40)	65
Canada Hot 100 (Billboard)	7
Canada CHR/Top 40 (Billboard)	17
Canada Hot AC (Billboard)	11
Canada Rock (Billboard)	1
New Zealand (Recorded Music NZ)	36
Scottish Singles Sales (Official Charts)	58
South Africa (EMA)	1
Spain (Promusicae)	47
UK Singles (Official Charts Company)	125
US Billboard Hot 100	31
US Adult Pop Airplay (Billboard)	17
US Hot Rock & Alternative Songs (Billboard)	2
US Pop Airplay (Billboard)	16
US Rock & Alternative Airplay (Billboard)	1

=== Year-end charts ===
Year-end chart performance for "Come with Me Now"
Chart (2014)	Position
Canada (Canadian Hot 100)	27
US Billboard Hot 100	88
US Hot Rock Songs (Billboard)	10
US Rock Airplay (Billboard)	2

== Certifications ==
Certifications and sales for "Come with Me Now"
Region	Certification	Certified units/sales
Canada (Music Canada)	2× Platinum	160,000^{*}
New Zealand (RMNZ)	Platinum	30,000^{‡}
United Kingdom (BPI)	Silver	200,000^{‡}
United States (RIAA)	2× Platinum	1,300,000
^{*} Sales figures based on certification alone.^{‡} Sales+streaming figures based on certification alone.

== Release history ==
Release dates and formats for "Come with Me Now"
Country	Date	Format	Label	Ref.
South Africa	15 December 2012	Digital download	Tokoloshe	
United States	15 April 2014	Contemporary hit radio	Epic	
United Kingdom	4 September 2014	Digital download	Epic	
