= Lunatic (Kongos album) =

Studio album by Kongos
- Released: 28 December 2012 (original); October 2013 (US self-release); 27 January 2014 (iTunes re-release); 25 February 2014 (re-release)
- Recorded: 2012
- Studio: Tokoloshe Studios in South Africa
- Genre: Alternative rock; kwaito
- Length: 51:36
- Label: Tokoloshe (independent); Epic (2014 re-release)
- Producer: Kongos

Kongos chronology
Kongos (2007)	Lunatic (2012)	Egomaniac (2016)

Singles from Lunatic
- 1. "I'm Only Joking" Released: 2011; 2. "Come with Me Now" Released: 15 December 2012; 3. "I Want to Know" Released: 2012; 4. "Escape" Released: 2012; 5. "Sex on the Radio" Released: 2012

Professional ratings
Aggregate scores
Source	Rating
Metacritic	58/100
Review scores
Source	Rating
AllMusic	3.5/5 stars
Alternative Addiction	3.5/5 stars
The Guardian	3/5 stars
Renowned for Sound	4.5/5 stars

Lunatic is the second studio album by South African rock band Kongos. It was released independently by Tokoloshe on 28 December 2012. After signing with Epic Records, they re-released the album on 25 February 2014.

== Track listing ==
Original release
No.	Title	Lyrics	Music	Length
1.	"Come with Me Now"	John J. Kongos	John J. Kongos, Dylan Kongos	3:32
2.	"Sex on the Radio"	Dylan Kongos	Dylan	3:57
3.	"Escape"	Jesse Kongos	Jesse Kongos	4:34
4.	"Kids These Days"	Daniel Kongos	Daniel Kongos	3:56
5.	"As We Are"	John J.	John J.	4:43
6.	"I Want to Know"	Jesse	Jesse	3:55
7.	"Hey I Don't Know"	Jesse	John J., Dylan	4:01
8.	"Traveling On"	Dylan	Dylan	4:32
9.	"Take Me Back"	John J.	Dylan, John J.	4:46
10.	"It's a Good Life"	Jesse	Jesse	3:59
11.	"I'm Only Joking"	Jesse	Dylan, Jesse	3:45
12.	"This Time I Won't Forget"	John J.	John J.	5:46

Epic reissue
No.	Title	Lyrics	Music	Length
1.	"I'm Only Joking"	Jesse Kongos	Dylan Kongos, Jesse Kongos	3:45
2.	"Come with Me Now"	John J. Kongos	John J., Dylan	3:32
3.	"I Want to Know"	Jesse	Jesse, John J.	3:55
4.	"Escape"	Jesse	Jesse	4:34
5.	"Kids These Days"	Daniel Kongos	Daniel Kongos	3:56
6.	"As We Are"	John J.	John J.	4:43
7.	"Sex on the Radio"	Dylan	Dylan	3:57
8.	"Hey I Don't Know"	Jesse	John J., Dylan	4:01
9.	"Traveling On"	Dylan	Dylan	4:32
10.	"Take Me Back"	John J.	Dylan, John J.	4:46
11.	"It's a Good Life"	Jesse	Jesse	3:59
12.	"This Time I Won't Forget"	John J.	John J. Kongos	5:46

== Personnel ==
Adapted from the Lunatic liner notes.

Kongos

- Dylan Kongos – lead vocals (1,2,4,5,8,9,12), bass, pedal-steel guitar (1), acoustic guitar, programming, backing vocals
- Johnny Kongos – accordion, piano, synths, programming, backing vocals
- Jesse Kongos – drums, percussion, programming, lead vocals (3,6,7,10,11), backing vocals
- Danny Kongos – guitar, backing vocals

Artwork

- Kongos – artwork
- Danny Kongos – photography

Production

- Kongos – producer, recording, mixing
- Jesse Kongos – mastering

Additional musician

- John Kongos – executive producer, additional backing vocals

== Charts ==
=== Weekly charts ===
Chart (2014)	Peak position
US Billboard 200	39
US Heatseekers Albums (Billboard)	2
US Top Rock Albums (Billboard)	19
US Top Alternative Albums (Billboard)	9

=== Year-end charts ===
Chart (2014)	Position
US Top Rock Albums	53
US Alternative Albums (Billboard)	38
