= Egomaniac (album) =

Studio album by Kongos
- Released: June 10, 2016
- Genre: Alternative rock
- Length: 43:49
- Label: Epic

Kongos chronology
Lunatic (2014)	Egomaniac (2016)	1929, Pt. 1 (2019)

Professional ratings
Review scores
Source	Rating
AllMusic	3.0/5 stars
Rolling Stone	3.0/5 stars

Egomaniac is the third studio album by South African rock band Kongos. It was released through Epic Records on June 10, 2016. Egomaniac is the first and last album signed with Epic Records. After the single "Take It from Me" was released, the label changed their minds and decided not to support the radio campaign, thus stopping the album's active promotion. Because of this, Kongos decided to stop working with the label, but it wasn't until two years later that the contract with Epic Records was terminated. John Joseph Kongos said, "We have already been suffocated by this label. It's killed a process of everything for us and we've lost energy in it. They have killed music for us."

== Track listing ==
No.	Title	Lyrics	Music	Length
1.	"Take It from Me"	Jesse Kongos	Jesse Kongos	3:10
2.	"The World Would Run Better"	Danny Kongos	Danny Kongos	3:00
3.	"I Want It Free"	Johnny Kongos, Jesse Kongos	Dylan Kongos, Johnny Kongos	3:45
4.	"Underground"	Dylan Kongos	Dylan Kongos	3:17
5.	"Autocorrect"	Jesse Kongos	Jesse Kongos	3:23
6.	"Where I Belong"	Danny Kongos	Danny Kongos	3:08
7.	"Birds Do It"	Johnny Kongos	Johnny Kongos	3:15
8.	"2 in the Morning"	Danny Kongos	Danny Kongos	3:12
9.	"Look at Me"	Jesse Kongos	Johnny Kongos	3:52
10.	"I Don't Mind"	Dylan Kongos	Dylan Kongos	3:26
11.	"Hey You, Yeah You"	Dylan Kongos	Dylan Kongos	3:00
12.	"Repeat After Me"	Johnny Kongos	Johnny Kongos	3:49
13.	"If You Could"	Jesse Kongos	Jesse Kongos	3:32
Total length:				43:49

== Personnel ==
Kongos

- Dylan Kongos – vocals, bass, lead guitar (3,10), synths (4,11), programming, backing vocals
- Johnny Kongos – accordion, piano, synths, programming, vocals
- Jesse Kongos – drums, programming, vocals
- Danny Kongos – guitars, slide guitar, vocals

== Charts ==
Chart (2016)	Peak position
Canadian Albums (Billboard)	41
US Billboard 200	80
