= Kongos (band) =

South African band

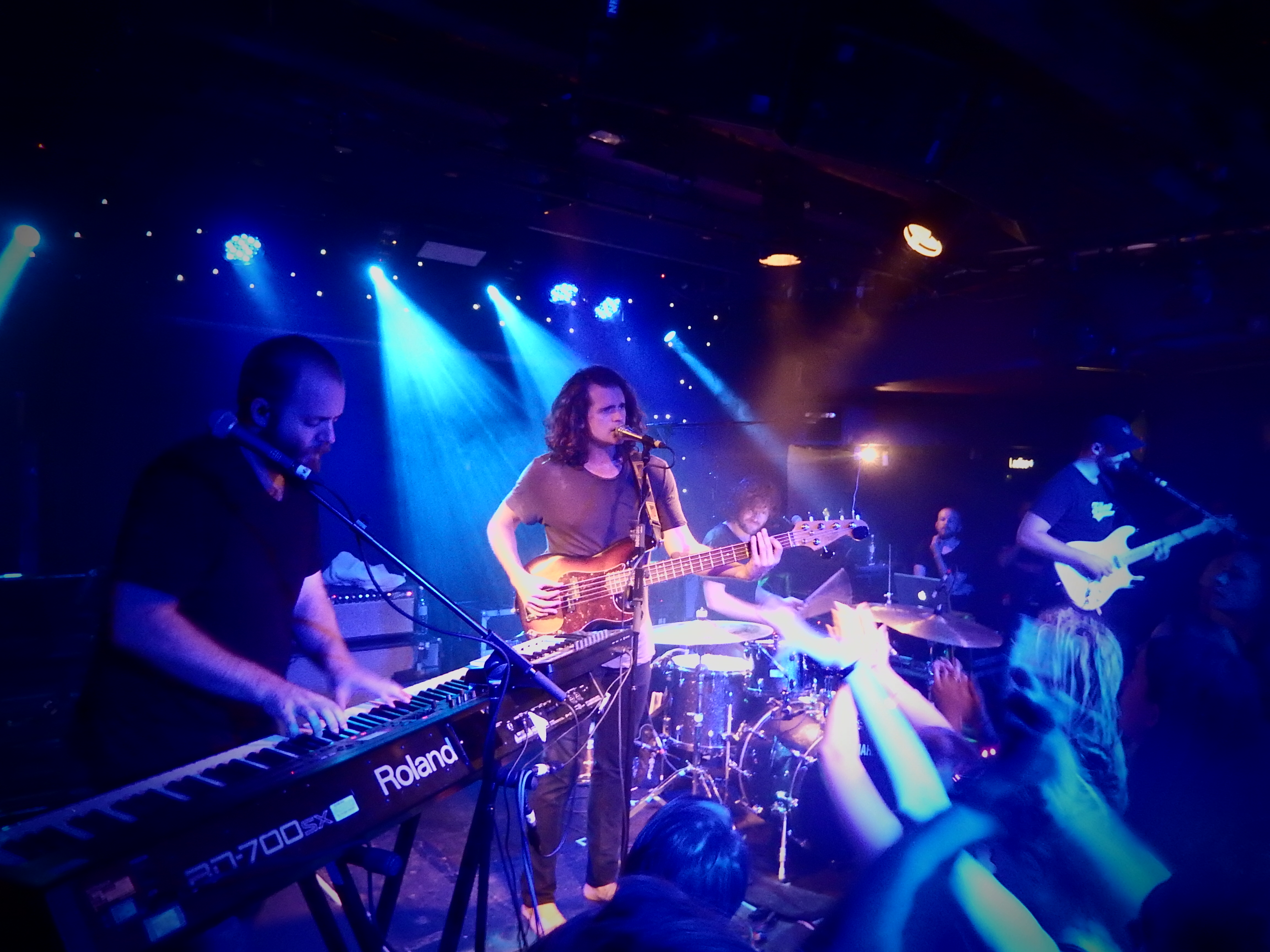
- Kongos performing at Dingwalls, London, 2016

Background information
- Origin: Pretoria, South Africa
- Genres: Alternative rock; kwaito; hard rock
- Years active: 2003–present
- Labels: Tokoloshe; Epic; Rock All Night Productions LLC
- Members: Dylan Kongos; Johnny Kongos; Jesse Kongos; Daniel Kongos
- Website: kongos.com

Kongos (often styled as KONGOS) is a South African-American band, now based in Austin, Texas. The alternative rock group consists of four brothers: Dylan (vocals, bass guitar, guitar), Johnny (accordion, keyboards, vocals), Jesse (drums, percussion, vocals) and Daniel Kongos (guitar, vocals).

== Beginnings ==
They spent their childhoods in the city of East London, South Africa. They compose, record and perform in Austin, Texas. They graduated from Chaparral High School in Scottsdale, Arizona and attended Arizona State University. The four men are the sons of recording artist John Kongos. They are of Greek, American and Mexican origin and have attended the Greek SAHETI School in Gauteng, South Africa.

== History ==
=== Lunatic (2011–2015) ===
The band's second album Lunatic was released in 2012. The single "I'm Only Joking" topped various South African charts, including all three of Tuks FM's charts, and received copious airtime on 5FM and on many other stations in South Africa. The music video for the song debuted on TV 5 on SABC 3 and was in rotation on MKTV. Their second single "Come with Me Now" was in rotation on both 5FM and Tuks FM. The song appeared on the 5FM Top 40 and the Tuks FM Top 30 charts.

In late October 2013, the band self-released Lunatic in the United States. In 2014, both "I'm Only Joking" and "Come with Me Now", the latter of which being their top song, began receiving noticeable exposure in the United States, gaining momentum in airplay on radio and being featured in television commercials there. Their song "Come with Me Now" was used as the official theme song for WWE's pay-per-view event Extreme Rules and in the motion picture The Expendables 3. As a result, the band was signed by Epic Records in late January 2014 and the band re-released Lunatic. "Come with Me Now" had sold more than 70,000 copies as of March 2014, but has since been certified Platinum by the RIAA, signifying sales of more than a million copies.

=== Egomaniac (2016) ===
On 27 March 2016, Kongos announced via their newsletter that their third album, Egomaniac, would be released on 10 June 2016 and that the first single, "Take It from Me", would premiere on 15 April. On 28 April 2016, the second instant grat track "I Don't Mind" was released to album pre-order customers. The official Egomaniac tour was announced in June 2016 commencing in September.

=== The Front Lounge, Bus Call and 1929 (2017–present) ===
On 16 November 2017, the band released the first installment of their new podcast, The Front Lounge, to be updated weekly. It was here they hinted towards the documentary of their lives on the road while touring for three years. The band officially announced the documentary, titled Bus Call, on 31 January 2018. On 5 February 2018, the band released the title of their fourth album, 1929, with no further information. They had been sharing photos and videos from their studio, hinting towards the album's release on their social media pages.

1929, Pt. 1 was released on 18 January 2019. 1929, Pt. 2 was released on 11 October 2019.

== Members ==
- Dylan Kongos – vocals, bass guitar, rhythm guitar (2011–present), lead guitar (2007–2011), keyboards, programmer
- Daniel Kongos – rhythm guitar (2007–2011), lead guitar (2011–present), vocals
- Johnny Kongos – accordion, keyboards, programmer, vocals
- Jesse Kongos – drums, percussion, programmer, vocals

== In popular culture ==
The film Holy Motors, and the video game Borderlands: The Pre-Sequel used "Come with Me Now" in the trailer, The Claptrap Trailer, and WWE also used this song as the theme for their 2014 pay-per-view event Extreme Rules. It is also the theme song for the Australian version of reality television series I'm a Celebrity...Get Me Out of Here! since 2015. It was used in the soundtrack to the movie The Expendables 3 and for the trailer to the automotive show The Grand Tour. The song was also used in an advertisement for Universal Studios Florida, as well as an advertisement for Strongbow

Heartland Radio 2.0, presented by The Pat McAfee Show, used their song "I Want to Know" for a recurring Q&A segment.

== Discography ==
- Kongos (2007)
- Lunatic (2012)
- Egomaniac (2016)
- 1929, Pt. 1 (2019)
- 1929, Pt. 2 (2019)
- 1929, Pt. 3 (2022)
