= Here's to the Night =

2001 single by Eve 6

Single by Eve 6

from the album Horrorscope
- B-side: "Inside Out"; "Tongue Tied"; "Waterfalls"
- Released: March 6, 2001
- Length: 4:09
- Label: RCA
- Songwriters: Max Collins; Eve 6
- Producer: Don Gilmore

Eve 6 singles chronology
"On the Roof Again" (2000)	"Here's to the Night" (2001)	"Think Twice" (2003)

Music video
- "Here's to the Night" on YouTube

"Here's to the Night" is a song by American alternative rock band Eve 6. It was released by RCA Records on March 6, 2001, as the third single from the band's second album, Horrorscope (2000). It peaked at number 30 on the US Billboard Hot 100 on July 28, 2001. "Here's to the Night", along with "Inside Out", is one of the band's best-known songs.

== Composition ==
According to the sheet music published at Musicnotes.com by Alfred Publishing, the song is written in the key of G major and is set in time signature of common time with a tempo of 100 beats per minute. Collins's vocal range spans one octave, from D_{4} to D_{5}.

== Track listing ==
- Australian CD single
1. "Here's to the Night" – 4:09
2. "Inside Out" – 3:39
3. "Tongue Tied" – 3:10
4. "Waterfalls" – 3:18

== Credits and personnel ==
Credits and personnel are adapted from the Australian CD single liner notes.

- Eve 6 – writing
- Max Collins – writing
- Don Gilmore – production, engineering
- John Ewing Jr. – additional engineering, editing
- Tom Lord-Alge – mixing

== Charts ==
=== Weekly charts ===
Chart (2001)	Peak position
New Zealand (Recorded Music NZ)	34
US Billboard Hot 100	30
US Adult Pop Airplay (Billboard)	7
US Alternative Airplay (Billboard)	33
US Pop Airplay (Billboard)	14

=== Year-end charts ===
Chart (2001)	Position
US Billboard Hot 100	90
US Adult Top 40 (Billboard)	17
US Mainstream Top 40 (Billboard)	45

== Release history ==
Region	Date	Format(s)	Label(s)	Ref.
United States	March 6, 2001	Alternative radio	RCA	
United States	April 17, 2001	Contemporary hit radio	RCA	
Australia	November 12, 2001	CD	RCA; BMG	
