= Inside Out (Eve 6 song) =

1998 single by Eve 6

Single by Eve 6

from the album Eve 6
- B-side: "Showerhead"; "Saturday Night"
- Released: May 1998
- Studio: Sound City (Van Nuys); Chomsky Ranch (Hollywood); Stepping Stone (Seattle)
- Genre: Alternative rock
- Length: 3:39
- Label: RCA
- Songwriter: Max Collins
- Producer: Don Gilmore

Eve 6 singles chronology
"Inside Out" (1998)	"Leech" (1998)

Music video
- "Inside Out" on YouTube

"Inside Out" is a song by American alternative rock band Eve 6, released in May 1998 from their self-titled debut album as their debut single. The song was a hit in North America, topping the US Billboard Modern Rock Tracks chart for four nonconsecutive weeks. In September 2023, for the chart's 35th anniversary (by which time it had been renamed to Alternative Airplay), Billboard ranked the song at number 58 on its list of the 100 most successful songs in the chart's history. It also reached number 28 on the Billboard Hot 100, number 36 on Canada's RPM 100 Hit Tracks chart, and number 24 in Iceland.

It was the band's biggest hit; however, it would not be accurate to say that they were a one-hit wonder, as their 2001 single "Here's to the Night" was also successful.

== Content ==
Eve 6, at the time named "Yakoo", were a trio of teenagers who played occasional punk-rock shows at their high school. An A&R representative for a local punk label called Doctor Dream was at one of their high school shows, and she was impressed by the band, eventually recommending them to an A&R representative from RCA Records. The RCA Records representatives were unimpressed by Yakoo's demos, but one RCA producer, Don Gilmore, saw potential. Gilmore helped the band rearrange their "Inside Out" demo, including lengthening the verses and adding the "I alone..." bridge. Singer Max Collins admitted that the band initially was upset by these suggestions and took them personally, but they later realized the tweaks were beneficial.

"We were 16 and 17 years old when we wrote Eve 6, and it sounds like it,” said Collins in 2018. "For that whole record, I was pretty much writing it at this one girl who cheated on me and broke my heart," he said. "My muse would have been that relationship and that girl, and not really having the emotional equipment to know how to deal with it."

== Track listings and formats ==
- Australian and European maxi-CD single
1. "Inside Out" – 3:39
2. "Showerhead" – 3:04
3. "Saturday Night" – 2:51
- European 7-inch single
1. "Inside Out" – 3:39
2. "Showerhead" – 3:04

== Charts ==
=== Weekly charts ===
Chart (1998–1999)	Peak position
Canada Top Singles (RPM)	36
Iceland (Íslenski Listinn Topp 40)	24
US Billboard Hot 100	28
US Adult Pop Airplay (Billboard)	16
US Alternative Airplay (Billboard)	1
US Mainstream Rock (Billboard)	5
US Pop Airplay (Billboard)	11

=== Year-end charts ===
Chart (1998)	Position
US Adult Top 40 (Billboard)	77
US Mainstream Rock Tracks (Billboard)	34
US Mainstream Top 40 (Billboard)	76
US Modern Rock Tracks (Billboard)	2

Chart (1999)	Position
US Adult Top 40 (Billboard)	43
US Mainstream Rock Tracks (Billboard)	66
US Mainstream Top 40 (Billboard)	51
US Modern Rock Tracks (Billboard)	56

== Certifications ==
Certification for "Inside Out"
Region	Certification	Certified units/sales
New Zealand (RMNZ)	Gold	15,000^{‡}
^{‡} Sales+streaming figures based on certification alone.

== In popular culture ==
In December 2020, Eve 6's official Twitter account became the subject of media attention as "a trove of internet comedy" owing, in part, to its querying of various public figures as to whether they "like the heart in a blender song" (referring to the most well-known lyric of "Inside Out").

== See also ==
- List of number-one alternative singles of the 1990s (U.S.)
