= Eve 6 =

American rock band

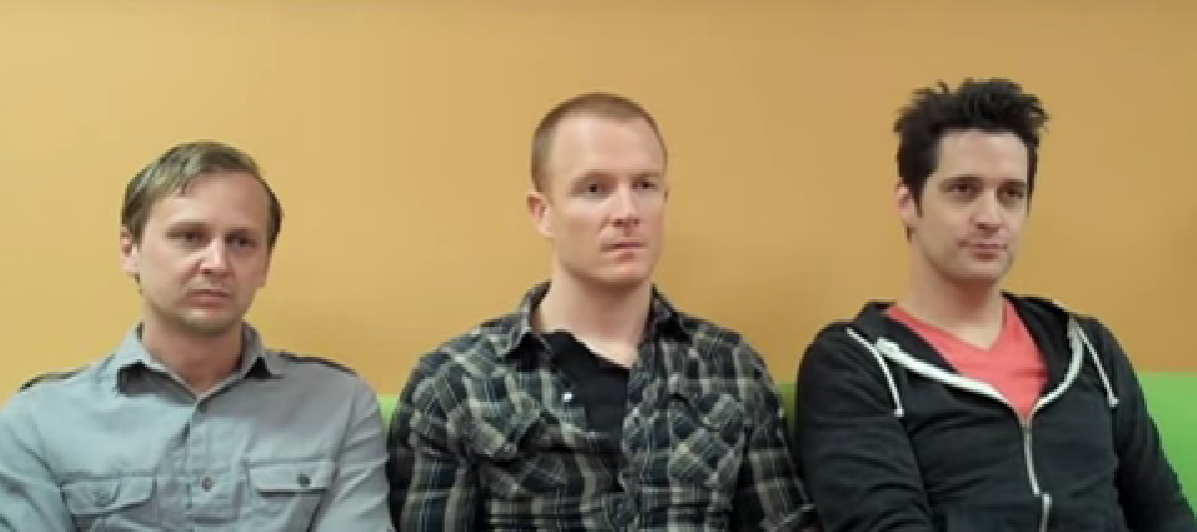
- The lineup in 2012 (left to right: Jon Siebels, Max Collins, Tony Fagenson)

Background information
- Also known as: Yakoo (1995–1996) Eleventeen (1996–1997)
- Origin: La Crescenta-Montrose, California, U.S.
- Genres: Alternative rock; post-grunge
- Years active: 1995–2004; 2007–present
- Labels: RCA; BMG; Sony; Fearless; Velocity
- Members: Max Collins; Jon Siebels; Ben Hilzinger
- Past members: Nick Meyers; Tony Fagenson; Matt Bair
- Website: eve6.com

Eve 6 is an American rock band formed in 1995 in Southern California, best known for its hit singles "Inside Out" and "Here's to the Night". It disbanded in 2004, returned for numerous tours in 2007 with a new lineup, and finally reunited with all three original members in early 2011. It signed to Fearless Records in the spring of that year, and released its fourth album, Speak in Code, containing the singles "Victoria" and "Curtain", in April 2012. In 2021, it released a new EP, Grim Value, and in 2022, a full-length album, Hyper Relevisation, on Velocity Records. In 2024, the band self-released their sixth album titled Dream Fist.

== History ==
=== Initial run (1995–2004) ===
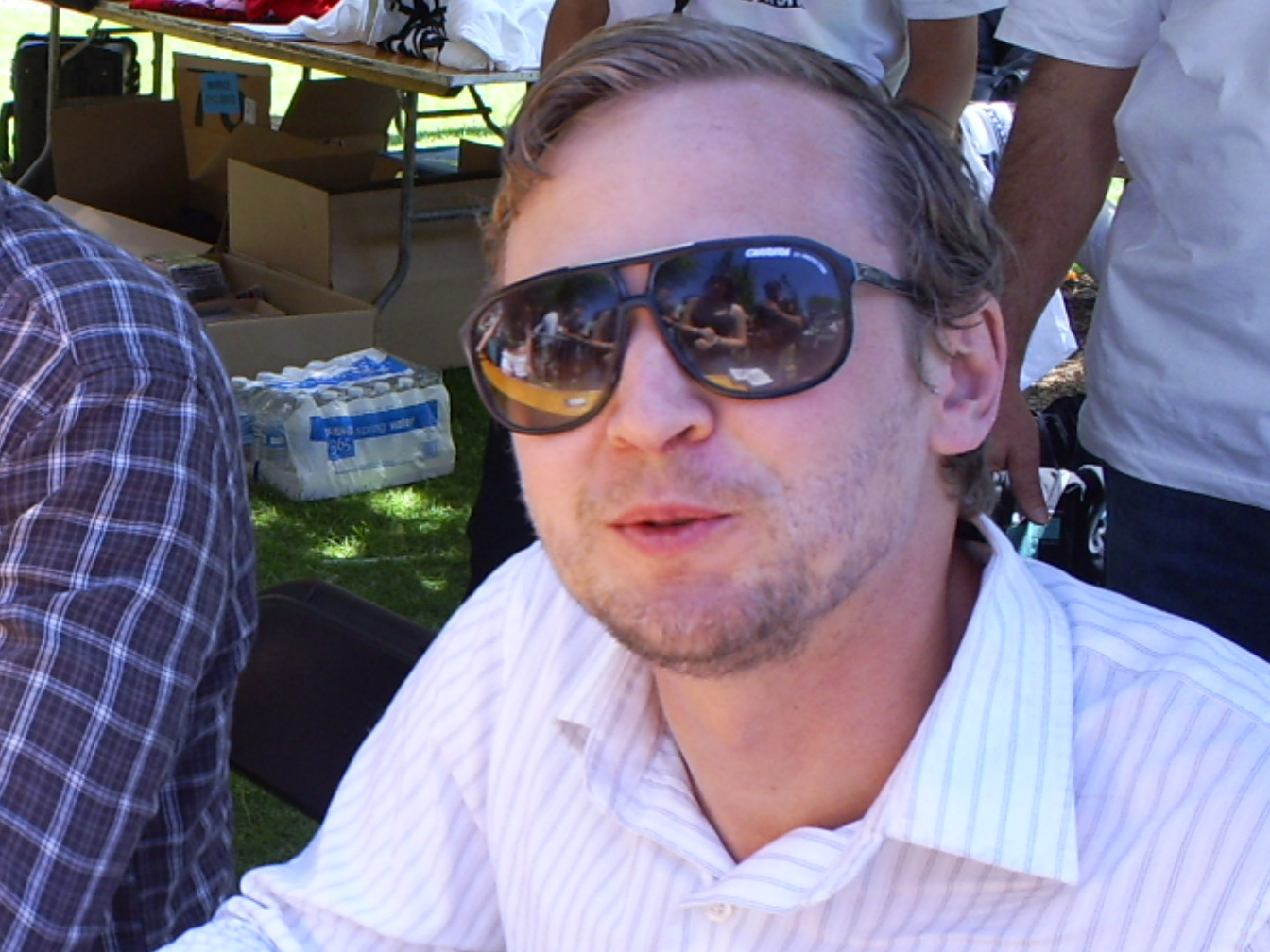
Guitarist Jon Siebels in 2012

The band originally consisted of Max Collins (bass, lead vocals), Jon Siebels (guitar, backing vocals), and Nick Meyers (drums). The band formed in 1995 in La Crescenta, California first as Yakoo, then Eleventeen; the name Eve 6 was adopted later. Their first gig was at Eagle's Coffee Pub in North Hollywood, Los Angeles. Eleventeen had secured a recording contract with RCA while the band's members were still in high school and being managed by Jake Knight. After recording the unreleased Eleventeen EP, Meyers left the band; he was replaced by Tony Fagenson.

The band's final name is a reference to The X-Files. Fagenson, a fan of the show, suggested the name after seeing an episode titled "Eve," which included a character who went by the name of "Eve 6."

The band issued the self-titled Eve 6 in 1998, attaining platinum success with hit singles "Inside Out" and "Leech;" the former capturing the No. 1 spot on the Modern Rock charts, spending several weeks on the top ten list on MTV's Total Request Live, and crossing over successfully to pop/Top 40 radio. The album also includes "Tongue Tied" which was used as a soundtrack for the racing game Test Drive 6. More widespread recognition came with gold-selling sophomore effort Horrorscope (2000), which spawned "Promise," "On the Roof Again," and the Top 40 hit "Here's to the Night."

The band made appearances on The Tonight Show with Jay Leno, The Late Show with David Letterman, Jimmy Kimmel Live!, Late Night with Conan O'Brien, and TRL with Carson Daly. Their videos were in constant rotation on MTV; the most notable was the video for "Here's To The Night", which sat near the top of MTV's TRL countdown for much of the summer of 2001. The band then released the more experimental It's All in Your Head in 2003, featuring top 10 Modern Rock hit "Think Twice," but parted ways with RCA thereafter. Their rapid rise to prominence at an early age had led to mental and physical exhaustion; in 2004, Eve 6 announced an indefinite hiatus.

"There were parts which were fucking incredible, and amazing and awesome, and there were aspects that were terrifying and freaky that you don't know how to handle. I feel like we did some growing up in public," says Collins. "I needed to stop drinking. In order to do that, the wheels had to come off. I don't think I could have done it if the band was still going."

=== Breakup (2004–2007) ===
Relatively poor sales of It's All in Your Head resulted in Eve 6's release from their contract with RCA. Announcing their breakup, Eve 6 played their final show together on July 15, 2004, under the Gateway Arch in St. Louis. Collins had a short-lived project called Brotherhood of Lost Dogs, before Collins and Fagenson reunited to form a new band called The Sugi Tap. They recorded some demos and played shows throughout the California region during 2006. Collins and Fagenson also began writing and producing for other artists, including Puddle of Mudd's "We Don't Have to Look Back Now". "It was an inspiring time, going down different musical avenues together and trying things we wouldn't have in Eve 6," reflects Fagenson. "Ironically, when we did reform Eve 6 a couple years later, those experiments allowed us to progress the sound of the band more freely than if we had been in the band the whole time."

=== Reunion (2007–2012) ===
On October 1, 2007, after performing for over a year as The Sugi Tap, it was leaked that a newly reunited Eve 6 including Collins, Fagenson, and new guitarist Matt Bair would be going on tour. The Sugi Tap, as a result, was put on indefinite hiatus.

Collins and Fagenson played extensively as Eve 6 starting in 2008, with Bair temporarily replacing Siebels who was occupied with his project Monsters Are Waiting. The band spent the next three years touring, writing, and reconnecting with fans before signing with Fearless Records in 2011. A month within inking the deal, Collins and Fagenson finally convinced Siebels to return to the band. "After going down some different paths it hit me that there was this thing out there that people wanted and wanted to hear," explains Siebels. "It just clicked and made sense to me. After such a long break I was so happy to be playing with these guys again." Fagenson continues, "The way [Siebels] hits the strings and puts that muscle into the chords is very distinctive to our band, and that was a welcome piece of the sound that we had missed. Songs that had been kicking around for a couple years got new life with his playing put into them."

Eve 6 then re-enlisted Don Gilmore (Linkin Park, Dashboard Confessional, Good Charlotte)—who produced the first two Eve 6 albums—to helm the sessions for Speak in Code. The album contains a mix of compositions that began as far back as the side project, as well as recent works written in the months leading up to the recording process. "We were really taking a 'best of everything' sort of approach, almost like a band's first album, in which there's a lot of material to choose from," Fagenson notes. "About half the songs were standouts from what Max and I had been working on and demoing over the years, and the other half were newer ideas that came with the inspiration of Jon's return and all that was happening to us at the time. We have a unique process, where each song is sort of its own animal. Don was crucial in helping us tighten everything up, and inspiring Max to dig really deep lyrically and get to some root emotion down there." Collins explains, "Neil Finn [of Crowded House] once said, 'A great producer is someone whom you admire musically and otherwise, who you feel compelled to show up and show off for.' I feel like Don is that figure for me and the band."

=== Speak in Code (2012–2020) ===
Eve 6 released Speak in Code on April 24, 2012, their fourth full-length release. It contains the singles "Victoria" and "Curtain", the former receiving substantial airplay on the Modern Rock format in 2012. Music videos were made for both singles and were released on digital outlets such as Vevo and Music Choice. The band toured throughout much of 2012 in support of Speak in Code, including stints with The All-American Rejects and Everclear, and a headlining tour throughout the U.S. The song "Lost & Found" was released as an advance single three months prior to the album's release.

"Overall I'm really proud of it, and I think we're doing right by our fans, who've waited a long time for us to make another record. I think we're giving them something they'll enjoy," says singer/bassist Max Collins. "Once we got in the studio there was a lot of energy. There aren't any filler moments; each song has its purpose. This is the strongest collection of songs we've ever had on one record."

"In some of the songs frustration is a theme. I was sort of looking at difficult personal relationships with a humorous spin in some places, and with more earnestness in others," explains Collins. "The title Speak in Code is a lyric from 'Curtain,' and there was something kind of evocative about it. In that song, I'm referring to being newly sober and just feeling like an open nerve, feeling freaked out, having people and life being sort of overwhelming. It's almost like people are speaking a language you don't understand."

The band announced that they would release Eve 6 on vinyl on December 9.

On April 7, 2018, drummer Tony Fagenson announced his departure from the group. The band then announced new drummer Ben Hilzinger, formerly of Beautiful Ben and the Unmistakable Stems, on Instagram. He is also the drummer of Fitness, which features Max Collins, as well as Kenny Carkeet (formerly of AWOLNATION).

=== Grim Value, Hyper Relevisation and Dream Fist (2021–present) ===
On February 4, 2021, the band released a music video for their new song "Black Nova," the announcement came with a release of their new EP titled "Grim Value" and release date of June 25, 2021, through Velocity Records. The band released "You Were Right" a collaboration with Bass Drum of Death on February 19, 2021. In April, the band streamed a live concert that debuted the new song called "Can We Combine", releasing a music video for that song the next day. Another music video for the new EP was released in August for the song "I Wanna Bite Your Face." A cover and music video of Operation Ivy (band)'s "Sound System" featured a collaboration by Eve 6 and We Are The Union was premiered on October 7 at Riot Fest. "Good For You (Better Version)" was posted on Facebook by the band on October 23. The new single "Androgyne Friend" premiered on December 5, and in an interview with Spin Magazine, Collins shared that they would release a new song "on the eve of the 6th of every month, leading up to the release of the rock trio’s self-produced fifth studio album, Hyper Relevisation [Velocity Records], late next year." The latest single "Get You" was released on January 5, 2022.

In early February 2022, Eve 6 joined in Neil Young's protest of streaming service Spotify. Collins told Fortune, “We're grateful that Neil Young was able to cause this critical mass and get all of this attention on Spotify. That’s making our boycott effort possible ... It's making people more receptive to our message, but at the same time it obscures the more interesting and devastating story, which is Spotify’s predatory business practices.” In protest of various Spotify business decisions, including the amount of money paid to artists per stream, the band changed their Spotify banner image in February 2022 to read "DELETE SPOTIFY" on a bright green background. In continuing their protest of Spotify, the band tweeted that their new song, "Revolushow", a protest song, was "available on Tidal and literally everywhere except Spotify and Amazon".

On February 9, they announced the Extreme Wealth Tour with We Are the Union, Field Medic, and comedian Jake Flores.

On August 10 the band announced their fifth album, Hyper Relevisation, would be released on September 23, 2022. In addition to the announcement, the album cover, the 10-song track-list and the song "Mr. Darkside" was also released. Pre-orders for the album were made available through the band's label.

Beginning in 2023, the band set up a Patreon account to release their new music, cover songs and essays. On September 24, 2024, the band announced their sixth studio album titled Dream Fist; it was released on October 4, 2024.

== Musical style ==
Eve 6's sound has been categorized as alternative rock and post-grunge. Screen Rant characterized the band's early material as fusing the commercial sounds of Goo Goo Dolls and Matchbox Twenty "and turning up the distortion and energy."

== Twitter account ==
In December 2020, multiple media outlets took note of the fact that Max Collins had become a prolific poster to Eve 6's official Twitter account. The account was "quickly becoming a trove of internet comedy," including queries to various public figures asking if they "like the heart in a blender song," "choice tidbits ... about his fellow washed stars," and "generic observations about wallet chains, weight gain, and merch with palm trees on it, as well as a running bit about not knowing the difference between Vertical Horizon, Dishwalla, Matchbox 20, et al." Loudwire crowned Collins the "new king of Twitter" and "the anti-Trapt of Twitter," the latter contrasting Collins' celebrated social media posts with those of Trapt lead singer Chris Taylor Brown.

== Band members ==
Current

- Max Collins – lead vocals, bass (1995–2004, 2007–present)
- Jon Siebels – guitar, backing vocals (1995–2004, 2011–present)
- Ben Hilzinger – drums, percussion (2018–present)

Touring

- Gabe Witcher – bass, backing vocals (2000–2001)
- JJ Bannasch – bass, backing vocals (2003–2004)

Former

- Nick Meyers – drums, percussion (1995–1996)
- Tony Fagenson – drums, percussion, backing vocals, keyboards, programming (1996–2004, 2007–2018)
- Matt Bair – guitar, backing vocals (2007–2011)

Timeline

== Discography ==
- Eve 6 (1998)
- Horrorscope (2000)
- It's All in Your Head (2003)
- Speak in Code (2012)
- Hyper Relevisation (2022)
- Dream Fist (2024)
