= Jon Siebels =

American musician (born 1979)

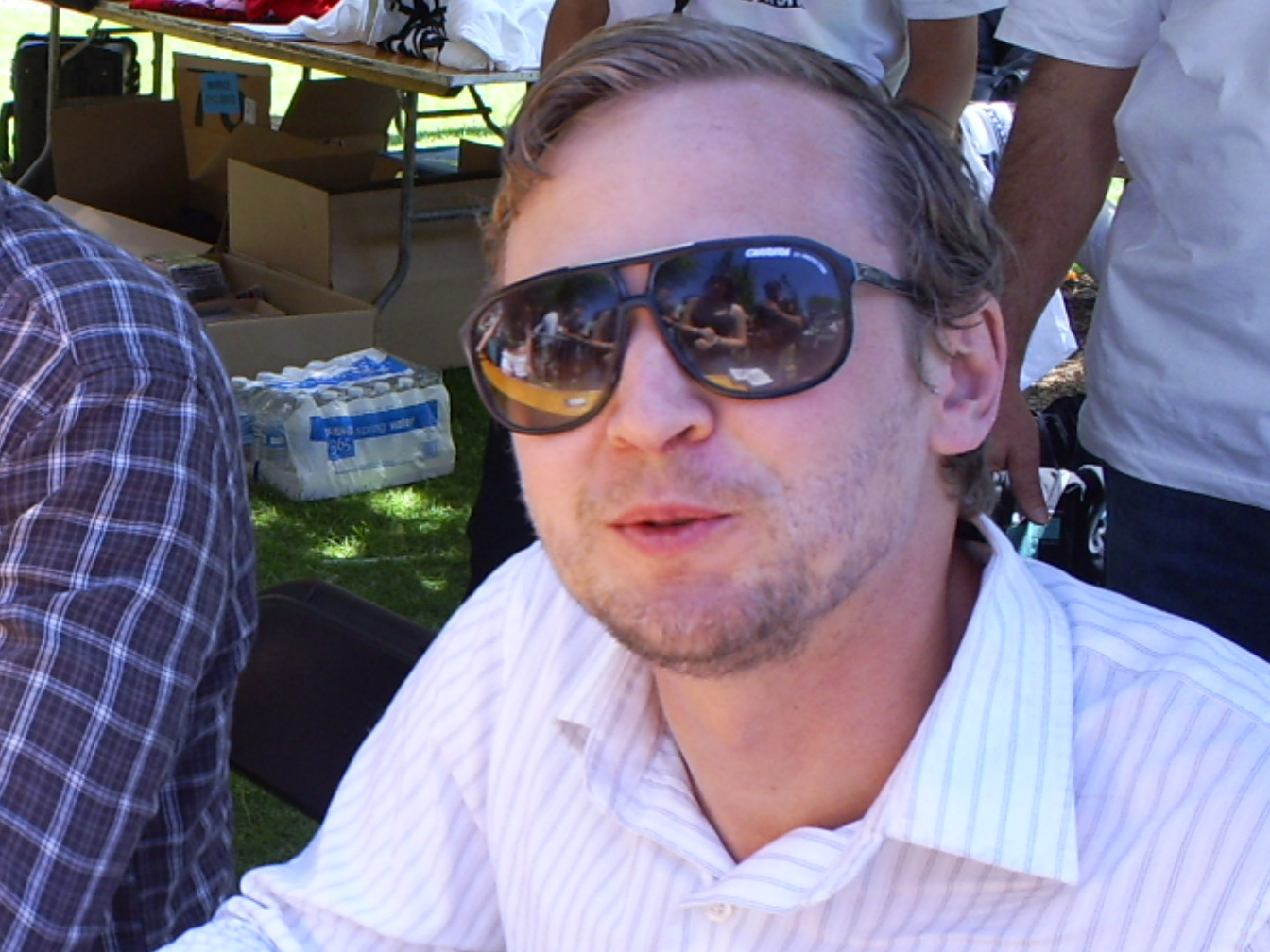
- Siebels in 2012

Background information
- Birth name: Jonathan Lee Siebels
- Born: August 27, 1979 (age 45)
- Occupation: Guitarist/Producer
- Instrument(s): Guitar, bass, vocals
- Years active: 1995–present

Jonathan Lee "Jon" Siebels (born August 27, 1979) is an American musician, best known as the guitarist of the band Eve 6.

In 2005, Siebels co-founded the business Be in A Band, which offered courses to teach people how to be in a band.

In 2006, Siebels was part of the band Monsters are Waiting.
