= Tony Fagenson =

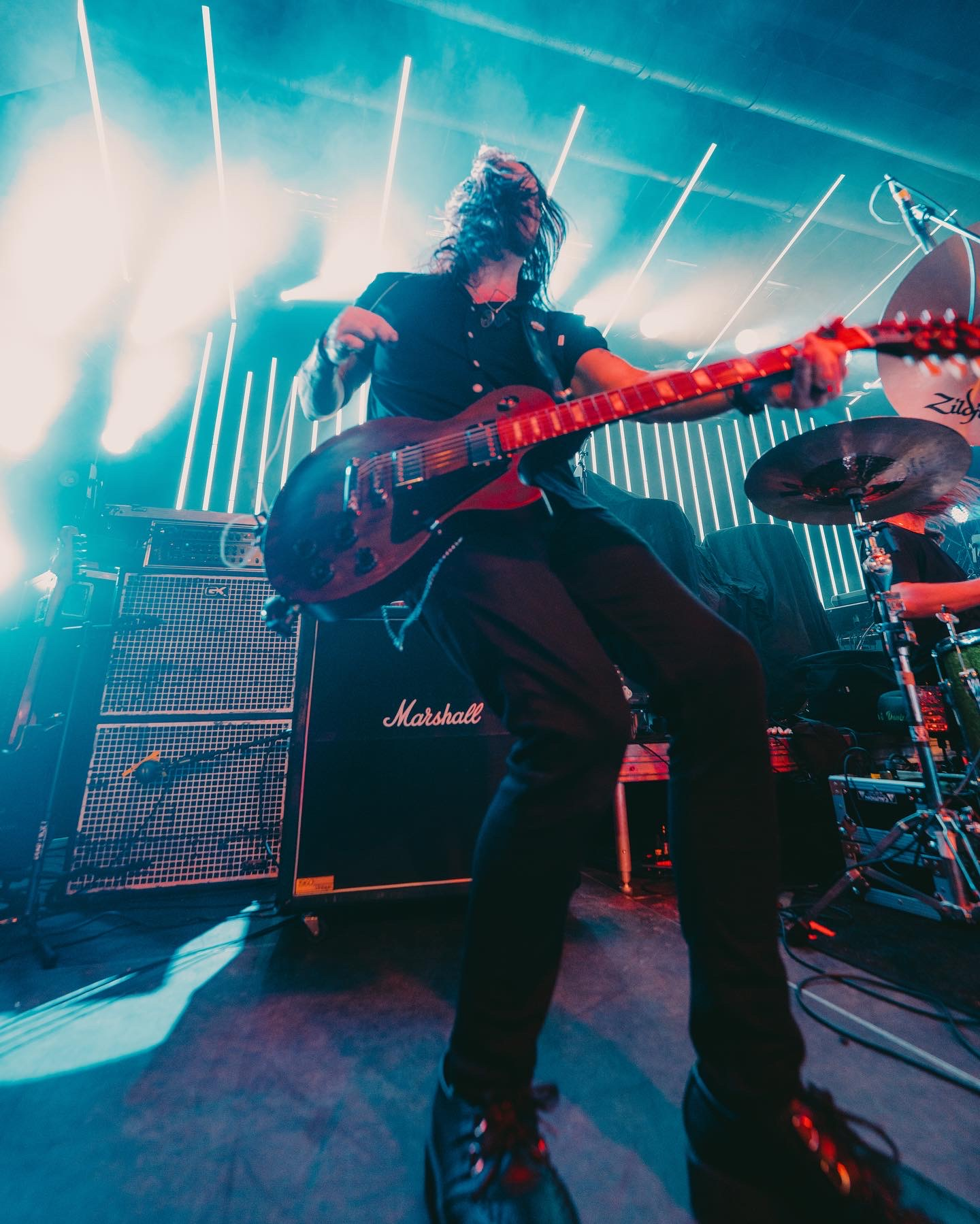
- Fagenson performing with Dead Posey in 2022

Background information
- Born: July 18, 1978 (age 48); Michigan, U.S.
- Occupations: Musician; producer
- Instruments: Guitar; drums; percussion; bass guitar; keyboards; piano; programming; vocals
- Years active: 1996–present
- Labels: Sumerian; Fearless; RCA
- Member of: Dead Posey
- Formerly of: Eve 6
- Spouse: Danyell Souza

Anthony Edward Fagenson (born July 18, 1978), also known as Tony Nova, is a guitarist, producer, songwriter and multi-instrumentalist who is best known for his work with rock bands Eve 6 and Dead Posey.

== Early life ==
Fagenson was born July 18, 1978 in Michigan, to Don Fagenson, known professionally as Don Was, and former Virgin Records A&R executive and video director Gemma Corfield.

== Eve 6 ==
While attending the University of Southern California at the age of 18, he auditioned for a band from La Crescenta, California called Eleventeen (eventually to become Eve 6) to replace their drummer. A fan at the time of the Fox TV show The X-Files, Fagenson and singer Max Collins were inspired to name the band Eve 6 after seeing the X-Files episode "Eve" while recording their first album. Fagenson played on and co-wrote the four Eve 6 albums released between 1998 and 2012.

Fagenson announced his departure from Eve 6 via Instagram and Twitter on April 7, 2018 and is now full time playing in his band Dead Posey.

== Producer and songwriter ==
When not spending time on band matters, Fagenson produced and co-wrote songs for artists such as Puddle of Mudd, Emily Osment (of Disney's Hannah Montana), The Johnsons & Bryce Vine, Sandra N, Illustrated, Malbec and more, as well as vocal editing and engineering for artists such as Gregg Allman. In 2005, Fagenson joined former Eve 6 member Max Collins in forming a new band, The Sugi Tap while Eve 6 was on hiatus.

== Dead Posey ==
In 2018, Fagenson started his current band Dead Posey as guitarist, co-writer & producer with partner Danyell Souza. The band released 3 EP's on Sumerian Records / Position Music - Freak Show, Malfunction] & Malfunction X Broken Down. Dead Posey released their debut album 'Are You In A Cult?' on October 18, 2024.

Dead Posey has played notable festivals Download, Louder Than Life, Aftershock, Shiprocked and Mad Cool Festival as well as touring with bands such as Theory of a Deadman, Palaye Royale, Bones UK, Sophie Lloyd and The Birthday Massacre.

Dead Posey's music has been heard in Fox's Lucifer, MTV's Teen Wolf, Marvel's Cloak & Dagger, and Netflix's Jack Whitehall: Travels With My Father, as well as in ads for Taco Bell, Sony PlayStation, Riot Games’ League of Legends, and more. In 2019 their song "Don't Stop The Devil" was the theme song for WWE's Elimination Chamber. The band's song "Parasite" from the Malfunction EP made the 68 Best Rock Songs of 2020 by Loudwire. Dead Posey has received positive write ups from the likes of Spin, Guitar World, Kerrang! Magazine and has collaborated with Hot Topic on their "I Like Scary Movies Experience" feature. They have also appeared on podcasts such as The Boo Crew, The Fred Minnick Show and She Will Rock You. In June 2022 Dead Posey have made their debut on Kerrang! Radio's show Fresh Blood hosted by Alex Baker and were picked as The Featured Artist Of The Week.

== Show One ==
Fagenson is the co-creator of ShowOne, a mobile backing tracks app for musicians.

== Personal life ==
Fagenson is married to bandmate Danyell Souza (Dead Posey). He is the son of the Grammy Award winning producer Don Was.
