= Attention: Miley Live =

Live album by Miley Cyrus
- Released: April 1, 2022
- Recorded: February 12, 2022
- Venues: Crypto.com Arena, Los Angeles
- Length: 82:12
- Label: Columbia

Miley Cyrus chronology
Plastic Hearts (2020)	Attention: Miley Live (2022)	Endless Summer Vacation (2023)

Attention: Miley Live (stylized in all caps) is the third live album by American singer Miley Cyrus. It was released on April 1, 2022, by Columbia Records. Most of the album was recorded during her concert as part of the Super Bowl Music Fest at the Crypto.com Arena in Los Angeles on February 12, 2022, with the set list including songs from her albums Plastic Hearts (2020), Miley Cyrus & Her Dead Petz (2015), Bangerz (2013), The Time of Our Lives (2009), Breakout (2008), and Meet Miley Cyrus (2007), along with multiple cover songs. The album also includes two unreleased tracks — "Attention" and "You", in which the latter would appear on her next studio album, Endless Summer Vacation. Cyrus said the album was "curated by the fans for the fans".

== Background ==
Cyrus announced the album at the end of her set at Lollapalooza Brazil in São Paulo on March 27, 2022. "You" was first performed by Cyrus during her Miley's New Year's Eve Party special in Miami on December 31, 2021, while "Attention" was teased during the Super Bowl Music Fest concert. The album was recorded in February 2022.

Music videos for "Attention", "We Can't Stop x Where Is My Mind?", "Wrecking Ball x Nothing Compares 2 U", "Never Be Me", and "Like a Prayer" were released on March 27, 28, 29, 30, and April 1, 2022, respectively.

On April 25, 2022, Cyrus announced the release of the deluxe version of the album, which would include six additional songs, that are mostly part of her time at the Lollapalooza festival in Brazil and other shows in Latin America, and she comments on the addition of "Angels like You" at her concert in Colombia in gratitude due to the song reaching the number one spot on iTunes in that country and because her fans sang the song all night outside the hotel where she was staying in Bogotá.

== Critical reception ==
Professional ratings
Review scores
Source	Rating
Clash	8/10
Pitchfork	5.6/10

Emily Swingle of Clash gave acclaim to Cyrus's versatile vocals, saying "Cyrus' voice is truly a force to be reckoned with, seamlessly fitting whatever genre Cyrus chooses to tackle. From the playful, country-hip-hop banger that is '4x4', to rap-heavy '23', to the bluesy, rich cover of Janis Joplin's 'Maybe', it seems like Cyrus can fit into just about any genre she gets her paws on." Pitchfork writer Dani Blum praised the album's covers, but questioned the inclusions of lesser songs from Cyrus' catalog like "23", saying "Cyrus sounds limp, drowned out by the constantly swirling siren that underpins the song. It's jarring to hear these songs now, and the appropriation baked into their legacy. For years, Cyrus clung to hip hop stylings and aesthetics, creating controversy after controversy, but here, she sounds barely committed to the Bangerz stretch of songs."

== Track listing ==
Standard edition
No.	Title	Writer(s)	Origin	Length
1.	"Attention"	Cyrus; Maxx Morando	previously unreleased	1:35
2.	"We Can't Stop X Where Is My Mind?"	Cyrus; Timothy Thomas; Theron Thomas; Pierre Slaughter; Michael Williams II; Douglas Davis; Ricky Walters; Charles Thompson IV	Bangerz (2013) X Pixies cover	5:34
3.	"Plastic Hearts"	Cyrus; Ryan Tedder; Alexandra Tamposi; Andrew Wotman; Louis Bell	Plastic Hearts (2020)	3:26
4.	"Heart of Glass"	Debbie Harry; Christopher Stein	Blondie cover, Plastic Hearts	3:07
5.	"4x4"	Cyrus; Pharrell Williams; Cornell Haynes Jr.	Bangerz	3:00
6.	"(SMS) Bangerz"	Cyrus; Sean Garrett; Marquel Middlebrooks; Williams II	Bangerz	3:20
7.	"Dooo It!"	Cyrus; Wayne Coyne; Stephen Drozd; Dennis Coyne	Miley Cyrus & Her Dead Petz (2015)	1:08
8.	"23"	Cyrus; T. Thomas; T. Thomas; Slaughter; Williams II; Jordan Houston; Cameron Thomaz	non-album single (2013)	8:53
9.	"Never Be Me"	Cyrus; Ilsey Juber; Mark Ronson	Plastic Hearts	3:33
10.	"Maybe"	Richie Barrett	Janis Joplin cover	4:07
11.	"7 Things"	Cyrus; Timothy James; Antonina Armato	Breakout (2008)	3:40
12.	"Bang Bang X See You Again"	Cyrus; James; Armato; Sonny Bono	Cher cover X Meet Miley Cyrus (2007)	4:32
13.	"Jolene"	Dolly Parton	Dolly Parton cover	4:26
14.	"High"	Cyrus; Caitlyn Smith; Jennifer Decilveo	Plastic Hearts	3:29
15.	"You"	Cyrus; Bibi Bourelly; Michael Pollack; Ian Kirkpatrick	previously unreleased, later included in Endless Summer Vacation (2023)	3:01
16.	"Like a Prayer"	Madonna Ciccone; Patrick Leonard	Madonna cover	3:27
17.	"Edge of Midnight" (Midnight Sky remix)	Cyrus; Juber; Jonathan Bellion; Tamposi; Wotman; Stephanie Nicks	Plastic Hearts	3:40
18.	"The Climb"	Jessi Alexander; Jonathan Mabe	Hannah Montana: The Movie (2009)	6:00
19.	"Wrecking Ball X Nothing Compares 2 U"	Sacha Skarbek; Maureen McDonald; Stephan Moccio; Lukasz Gottwald; Henry Walter; Prince Nelson	Bangerz X Sinéad O'Connor cover	5:13
20.	"Party in the U.S.A."	Jessica Cornish; Claude Kelly; Gottwald	The Time of Our Lives (2009)	7:00
Total length:				82:12

Deluxe edition
No.	Title	Writer(s)	Origin	Length
21.	"WTF Do I Know"	Cyrus; Tedder; Tamposi; Wotman; Bell	Plastic Hearts	2:59
22.	"Mother's Daughter X Boys Don't Cry" (with Anitta)	Cyrus; Andrew Wyatt; Alma Miettinen; Larissa Machado; Bourelly; Sean Douglas; Rami Yacoub; Matthew Burns	She Is Coming (2019) X Versions of Me (2022)	5:21
23.	"You" (Take 2)	Cyrus; Bourelly; Pollack; Kirkpatrick	previously unreleased, later included in Endless Summer Vacation	3:09
24.	"Nothing Breaks Like a Heart"	Cyrus; Juber	Late Night Feelings (2019)	3:54
25.	"Angels like You"	Cyrus; Tedder; Tamposi; Wotman; Bell	Plastic Hearts	4:10
26.	"Fly on the Wall"	Cyrus; Armato; James; Devrim Karaoglu	Breakout	3:03
Total length:				104:48

=== Notes ===
- All tracks are noted as "Live", except "Attention".
- "Attention" is stylized in all caps.

== Personnel ==
Musicians

- Miley Cyrus – lead vocals
- Anitta – featured vocals on 22
- Aaron Encinas – background vocals
- Ayotunde Awosika – background vocals
- Danielle Fleming – background vocals
- Joseph Ayotub – bass
- Stacy Jones – drums
- Jamie Arentzen – guitar
- Max Bernstein – guitar
- Michael Schmid – keyboards
- Demian Arriaga – percussion
- Steven Salcedo – saxophone
- Reginald Chapman – trombone
- Matthew Owens – trumpet

Technical

- Miley Cyrus – production
- Chris Gehringer – mastering
- Paul David Hager – mixing, engineering, recording
- Vish Wadi – engineering
- Craig Frank – editing, engineering assistance
- Cameron Manes – miscellaneous production
- Cody Clark – miscellaneous production
- David Jun – miscellaneous production
- Derek Purciful – miscellaneous production
- Evan Bovee – miscellaneous production
- Kyle Ronan – miscellaneous production
- Takyuki Nakai – miscellaneous production

== Charts ==
Chart performance for Attention: Miley Live
Chart (2022)	Peak position
Belgian Albums (Ultratop Flanders)	151
Czech Albums (ČNS IFPI)	49
Irish Albums (IRMA)	98
Norwegian Albums (VG-lista)	39
Spanish Albums (Promusicae)	71
Swiss Albums (Schweizer Hitparade)	46
UK Album Downloads (Official Charts)	5
US Top Current Album Sales (Billboard)	63

== Release history ==
Release dates and formats for Attention: Miley Live
Region	Date	Formats	Version	Labels	Ref.
Various	April 1, 2022	Digital download; streaming	Standard	Columbia	
Various	April 29, 2022	Digital download; streaming	Deluxe	Columbia	
