= Cattitude =

Cattitude may refer to:

- A song from the stage production of Garfield
- A song on the Miley Cyrus album She Is Coming
