= Versions of Me =

Studio album by Anitta
- Released: April 12, 2022
- Genre: Pop; reggaeton; Brazilian funk; trap
- Length: 43:54
- Language: English; Spanish; Portuguese; French (Note: Sung by Dadju, in the Deluxe edition)
- Label: Warner
- Producer: Beazy Tymes; The Best Soundz; Julian Bunetta; Burns; Charlie Handsome; Kuk Harrell; Mag; Mighty Mike; Mojam; Papatinho; RDD; Mauricio Rengifo; Van Riper; Ruckus; Mike Sabath; Jon Spencer; Stargate; Súbelo NEO; Ryan Tedder; Andrés Torres; Rami Yacoub

Anitta chronology
Kisses (2019)	Versions of Me (2022)	Funk Generation (2024)

Singles from Versions of Me
- 1. "Me Gusta" Released: September 18, 2020; 2. "Girl from Rio" Released: April 29, 2021; 3. "Faking Love" Released: October 14, 2021; 4. "Envolver" Released: November 11, 2021; 5. "Boys Don't Cry" Released: January 27, 2022; 6. "Gata" Released: August 5, 2022

Versions of Me is the fifth studio album by Brazilian singer Anitta, released on April 12, 2022, through Warner Records and originally planned to be titled Girl from Rio. Anitta covered her various versions on the album, with Ryan Tedder serving as one of the executive producers for the album. Her second multilingual visual album after her fourth studio album, Kisses (2019), Versions of Me contains collaborations with Chencho Corleone, Ty Dolla Sign, Afro B, Khalid, Saweetie, YG, Papatinho, MC Kevin o Chris, Mr. Catra, Cardi B and Myke Towers (in the standard edition), as well as Missy Elliott, Maluma, L7nnon, Maffio, ASAP Ferg, Harv, Pedro Sampaio, Dadju, Nicky Jam and MC Pedrinho (in the deluxe edition).

After Kisses (2019), Anitta conceived and recorded the album during the COVID-19 pandemic, as a way of showing her various versions as an artist and also in order to address the artist's sexual, romantic and affective relationships and each track works almost each of these situations separately. Building an album for two years, Anitta wanted to bring an impeccable album to the international market. Her collaborations with composers and record producers produced a softer tone, developing diverse vocal styles and influences from funk, reggaeton, hip hop music, and trap. The album's lyrical content explores themes such as feminism, women's independence, types of affective relationships, sex, relationship issues, inspired by the artist's desire to assert her creative freedom completely. The album also has a deluxe edition, intended to commercialize the contrasting facets of Anitta's art.

Versions of Me was preceded by eight singles: "Me Gusta" (featuring Cardi B and Myke Towers), "Girl from Rio", "Faking Love" (featuring Saweetie), "Envolver", "Boys Don't Cry", "Gata" (with Chencho Corleone), "El Que Espera" (featuring Maluma) and "Lobby" (featuring Missy Elliott). "Envolver" was a huge commercial success, becoming the first solo Latin song to reach the top of the Spotify Global Daily chart as well as reaching no. 2 on the Billboard Global 200. Upon release, the album received generally positive reviews from music critics, who praised its production. The album broke records on Spotify, opening with over six million streams and thus becoming the biggest debut of a Brazilian artist on the platform. The album also holds the record for biggest streaming week for a Brazilian artist on Spotify, with over 39 million streams. By May 2022, the album had earned 111.7 million on-demand song streams in the United States. In October 2022, Versions of Me became the first Brazilian pop album to hit 1 billion streams on Spotify.

== Background ==
After releasing her trilingual visual album Kisses (2019), Anitta started working on her fifth studio album, which was originally titled Girl from Rio. In a 2020 interview for the Brazilian magazine Veja, Anitta confirmed at that time that she had 30 songs ready for the album and was selecting the tracklist with her manager Brandon Silverstein. In April 2021, Anitta released the single "Girl from Rio", which was announced as the then-title track of the album, but Anitta and her team decided to hold off on releasing the album that year.

Anitta announced the album's changed title, release date and cover art on April 1, 2022, also saying that she would subsequently explain her thinking behind the album cover and that she "loved" that it was "causing controversy", stating that was her intent. She later released a statement on her social media accounts that read in part, "Even after millions of plastic surgeries, doctors and interventions... my inside just stays the same", which references the "notable plastic surgery differences" between the different faces on the cover. She also remarked that the title was changed to Versions of Me as it "made more sense".

In July 2022, Anitta confirmed the release of a deluxe edition of the album featuring collaborations with Maluma, "El Que Espera", and Missy Elliott, "Lobby". Both songs will have music videos and she also confirmed a music video for "Gata". "Gata" was then confirmed as the first single from the deluxe edition of the album released on August 5, 2022.

== Promotion ==
"Versions of Me" was released on April 12, 2022, through Warner Records, Anitta's first to be released under the label. The standard edition was released as a digital download and streaming. The deluxe edition was released on August 25, 2022.

To promote the single "Girl from Rio", Anitta performed on several American talk shows in May 2021, including The Tonight Show Starring Jimmy Fallon, Today and Jimmy Kimmel Live!. On September 12, 2021, she performed the song during the 2021 MTV Video Music Awards break, as part of a campaign by Burger King. She performed on The Tonight Show again on January 31, 2022, singing "Boys Don't Cry".

"Faking Love" featuring rapper Saweetie was released as the third single on October 14, 2021. Its music video directed by Bradley & Pablo was released the following day. The song was sent to US pop and rhythmic radio on October 19, 2021. "Faking Love" reached numbers 34 and 35 on Billboard's Mainstream Top 40 and Rhythmic charts, respectively. "Faking Love" was performed on the American talk show The Late Late Show with James Corden, where she sang the song with the rapper Saweetie in November 2021. The single was performed in various other events throughout that year, including Miley's New Year's Eve Party, KIIS-FM Jingle Ball 2021, among others.

On March 26, 2022, Anitta sang "Boys Don't Cry" with Miley Cyrus during the singer's show on the 2022 edition of Lollapalooza Brazil.

A brazilian funk remix of song "Practice" was performed by Anitta on Savage X Fenty Show. A simlish version of it was released for The Sims game.

== Singles ==
"Me Gusta" featuring Cardi B and Myke Towers, was released on September 18, 2020, as the official lead single from the album. In the United States, the song debuted at number 91 on the Billboard Hot 100 dated October 3, 2020, becoming Anitta's first entry on the chart.

"Girl from Rio" was released as the second single on April 29, 2021. It was released as the original title track before the concept of the album changed. A remix was released featuring DaBaby was released on June 11, 2021. Anitta then released her next English track, "Faking Love" featuring Saweetie, as the third single on October 14, 2021.

"Envolver" was released as the fourth single on November 11, 2021. The single managed to become one of Anitta's most successful singles to date and was her second Billboard Hot 100 entry reaching number 70 following a viral TikTok trend in March 2022. A remix featuring Justin Quiles was released on February 17, 2022.

"Boys Don't Cry" was released as the fifth single on January 27, 2022. Its accompanying music video was directed by Anitta herself and Christian Breslauer. The song was sent to US pop radio on February 8, 2021. The song reached number 33 on Billboard's Mainstream Top 40 chart.

On June 23, 2022, "Dançarina Remix" was released as a promotional single, later added to the deluxe edition of the album, with a music video and features Pedro Sampaio, Dadju, Nicky Jam and MC Pedrinho.

On August 4, 2022, Anitta announced "Gata" as the six single with its music video released the following day.

"El Que Espera" with Maluma was released on August 11, 2022, and "Lobby" with Missy Elliott was released the week after. Both are included on the deluxe edition of Versions of Me, released on August 25 with five additional songs and a different cover.

== Composition ==
Versions of Me is a reggaetón and power pop album with elements of electropop, EDM, alternative R&B, funk carioca, electro, and trap-pop. It is a trilingual album, just like Anitta's previous album, Kisses, with multicultural and diverse references and whose tracks "explore the diverse women and facets that inhabit Anitta's complex personality".

== Critical reception ==
=== Reviews ===
Professional ratings
Aggregate scores
Source	Rating
Album of the Year	77/100
Review scores
Source	Rating
The Line of Best Fit	7/10
NME	4/5 stars
Rolling Stone	4/5 stars
Tracklist	7,5/10
The Bulletin	70/100

Versions of Me received generally positive reviews from critics. On review aggregator Album of the Year, the album has a rating of 77 out of 100 based on 3 reviews.

Reviewing positively for NME, Nick Levine called the album "a searingly ambitious affair from a star who knows exactly what she wants", scoring it four out of five stars. In another positive review for Forbes, Chis Méndez affirmed Anitta "shows that she's more than just a pretty face—one that she's proud of after "hundreds" of cosmetic procedures. She easily hops between English, Spanish, and Portuguese as she sings about love, lust, loss, and everything in between".

For Rolling Stone, Julissa Lopez stated that Anitta's search for an international market "worked, and it made Anitta one of the biggest stars in the Latin pop world. For her next act, she's ready to take on the rest of the planet, and she's planning to do so by sharing the most uncompromising portrait of herself on Versions of Me". Reviewing the album for Rolling Stone, Charles Aaron found it to be "a tirelessly bewitching global dance-floor experience", adding "some may harbor doubts [of Anitta's success], but Anitta has the talent – and data – she needs", rating it four out of five stars.

Billboard affirmed the record "proves Anitta's versatility and chameleonic abilities to dabble in multiple genres". Ana Claro Ribeiro for The Life of Best Fit, said "as [Anitta] dreams of becoming Brazilian funk's poster girl and pave the way for more Brazilian artists to have a global platform, Anitta knows damn well that the route to success requires a few concessions and adjustments, and she's very willing to make them", rating the album 7 out of 10. In June 2022, Rolling Stone, ranked Versions of Me as one of the 58 best albums of 2022. The same month, Billboard ranked Versions of Me as one of the best 22 Latin albums of 2022.

=== Year-end lists ===
Select Year-end rankings
Publication	List	Rank	Ref,
Billboard	The 20 Best Pride Albums of 2022: Staff Picks	N/A	
Billboard	The 22 Best Latin Albums of 2022: Staff Picks	N/A	
Billboard	The 25 Best Pride Songs of 2022 - "Boys Don't Cry"	N/A	
YardBarker	The Best Songs that Defined 2022 - "Lobby"	N/A	
Eolor	Best Clips from Brazil in 2022 - "Boys Don't Cry"	4	
Rolling Stone	The 100 Best Albums of 2022	31	
Stereogum	The 10 Best Pop Albums of 2022	5	
UPROXX	The Best Latin Albums of 2022	N/A	
UPROXX	The Best Pop Albums of 2022	N/A	
Variety	The 10 Best Latin Albums of 2022	9	

== Awards and nominations ==
Year presented, name of the award ceremony, category, and result of nomination
Year	Award ceremony	Category	Result	Ref.
2022	Capricho Awards	Album of the Year	Won	
2022	LOS40 Music Awards	Best Latin Album	Nominated	
2022	MTV Millennial Awards Brazil	Album of the Year	Nominated	
2022	Multishow Brazilian Music Awards	Album of the Year	Nominated	
2022	Multishow Brazilian Music Awards	Cover of the Year	Nominated	
2023	GLAAD Media Awards	Outstanding Music Artist	Nominated	
2023	Premios Lo Nuestro	Urban - Album of the Year	Nominated	

== Track listing ==
Versions of Me — Standard edition
No.	Title	Lyrics	Music	Producer(s)	Length
1.	"Envolver"	Larissa Machado; Julio Gonzalez	Jose Cruz; Freddy Montalvo; Cristian Salazar	Súbelo NEO	3:13
2.	"Gata" (featuring Chencho Corleone)	Machado; Chencho Corleone; Gale	Abby Keen; Sly Dunbar; Everton Bonner; Marty Maro; John Taylor; Edwin Vega; Lloyd Willis	Ryan Tedder; Dennis DJ^{[a]}	3:26
3.	"I'd Rather Have Sex"	Alex Izquierdo; Sherwyn Nichols; Tia Scola	Marco Borrero; Julian Bunetta; Ben Free	Mag; Bunetta; Kuk Harrell^{[v]}	2:53
4.	"Gimme Your Number" (with Ty Dolla Sign)	Tyrone Griffin Jr.; Izquierdo; A. Keen	Daecolm Holland; Patrizio Pigliapoco; Ritchie Valens	Beazy Tymes; Ruckus; Van Riper; Harrell^{[v]}	2:37
5.	"Maria Elegante" (featuring Afro B)	Machado; Osmar Escobar; Donny Flores	Ross-Emmanuel Bayeto; Juan Castaneda; Joseph Charles; A. Keen; Santiago López; Dashawn White	The Best Soundz; Harrell^{[v]}	3:06
6.	"Love You"	Machado; Rachel Keen; Rook Monroe	Mike Sabath; Jon Spencer	Sabath; Spencer; Harrell^{[v]}	3:02
7.	"Boys Don't Cry"	Bibi Bourelly; Sean Douglas	Machado; Rami Yacoub; Matthew Burns	Burns; Yacoub^{[p]}; Harrell^{[v]}	2:16
8.	"Versions of Me"	Bourelly; Madison Love	Machado; Burns; Yacoub	Burns	3:04
9.	"Turn It Up"	Alyssa Cantu	Machado; Mighty Mike; Mauricio Rengifo; Tedder; Andrés Torres	Tedder; A. Torres; Rengifo; Mighty Mike; Harrell^{[v]}	2:39
10.	"Ur Baby" (featuring Khalid)	Eyelar; Gregory Hein; Khalid Robinson	Machado; James Murray; Mustafa Omer; Shakka Philipi; Lonnie Smith	Mojam; Harrell^{[v]}; Denis Kosiak^{[v]}	2:43
11.	"Girl from Rio"	Machado; R. Keen; Gale	Vinicius de Moraes; Antônio Carlos Jobim; Stargate	Stargate; Harrell^{[v]}	3:14
12.	"Faking Love" (featuring Saweetie)	Diamonté Harper; Kaine; A. Keen	Machado; Rengifo; Tedder; A. Torres	Tedder; A. Torres; Rengifo; Harrell^{[p]}	2:28
13.	"Que Rabão" (with Papatinho and MC Kevin o Chris featuring Mr. Catra and YG)	Machado; Wagner Domingues; Keenon Jackson; MC Copinho; Kevin de Oliveira	Papatinho	Papatinho	2:56
14.	"Me Gusta" (with Cardi B and Myke Towers)	Machado; Belcalis Almanzar; Gale; Benito Garcia; Michael Torres	Rengifo; Tedder; Rafa Dias; Wallace Chibatinha	Tedder; A. Torres; Rengifo; RDD; Harrell^{[v]}; Jean Rodriguez^{[v]}	3:00
15.	"Love Me, Love Me"	Machado; Gale	Ryan Vojtesak	Tedder; Charlie Handsome; Harrell^{[v]}	3:11
Total length:					43:48

Versions of Me — Deluxe edition
No.	Title	Lyrics	Music	Producer(s)	Length
1.	"Lobby" (with Missy Elliott)	Nija Charles; Melissa Elliott; Michael Pollack	Machado; Zach Skelton; Tedder	Tedder; Skelton; Harrell^{[v]}	2:37
2.	"El Que Espera" (with Maluma)	Machado; Juan Londoño Arias; Omar Sabino	Andy Clay; Luís Salazar	Clay; Salazar	2:50
3.	"Yo No Sé" (featuring L7nnon and Maffio)	Machado; Cris Chill; Carlos Peralta Mendoza	Symon Dice; Lennon dos Santos	Maffio	3:01
4.	"Practice" (featuring ASAP Ferg and Harv)	Tayla Parx; Emelie Walcott; Darold Ferguson Jr.	Remy Geutreau; Bernard Harvey; Kaya Kurchner; Julian McGuire	Harv	3:23
5.	"Dançarina" (remix; with Pedro Sampaio and Dadju, featuring Nicky Jam and MC Pedrinho)	Machado; Chill; Dadju Nsungula; Nick Rivera Caminero; Pedro Sampaio; Pedro Tempester	Mike Fraga dos Santos; William Mundala; Seydou Cissé; Rafael Silva de Queiroz; Jean Rodriguez	Dadju; Maikinho DJ; Sampaio; Rafinha RSQ	3:32
Total length:					59:19

=== Notes ===
- ^{^[p]} indicates a primary and vocal producer
- ^{^[a]} indicates an additional producer
- ^{^[v]} indicates a vocal producer
- "Gata" samples "Guatauba" performed by Plan B.
- "Gimme Your Number" sample "La Bamba" performed by Ritchie Valens.
- "Girl from Rio" interpolates "Garota de Ipanema" performed by Vinicius de Moraes e Tom Jobim.
- The song "Boys Don't Cry" became a track on the deluxe edition of the album Attention: Miley Live by Miley Cyrus after Anitta's participation in the performance of "Mother's Daughter" at Lollapalooza Brazil.

== Charts ==
Chart performance for Versions of Me
Chart (2022)	Peak position
French Albums (SNEP)	55
Spanish Albums (PROMUSICAE)	51
US Heatseekers Albums (Billboard)	2

== Certifications ==
Certifications for Versions of Me
Region	Certification	Certified units/sales
Brazil (Pro-Música Brasil)	Diamond	300,000^{‡}
^{‡} Sales+streaming figures based on certification alone.

== Release history ==
Release dates and formats for Versions of Me
Region	Date	Format(s)	Edition	Label	Ref.
Various	April 12, 2022	Digital download; streaming	Standard	Warner Records	
Various	August 25, 2022	Digital download; streaming	Deluxe	Warner Records	
