= Prisoner (Miley Cyrus song) =

2020 single by Miley Cyrus featuring Dua Lipa

Single by Miley Cyrus featuring Dua Lipa

from the album Plastic Hearts
- Released: November 19, 2020
- Recorded: July 2020
- Studio: Gold Tooth Music (Los Angeles, California); Glenwood Studios (Burbank, California)
- Genre: Dark pop; disco-punk; disco-rock; glam rock; nu-disco
- Length: 2:49
- Label: RCA
- Songwriters: Miley Cyrus; Andrew Wotman; Jordan K. Johnson; Marcus Lomax; Stefan Johnson; Ali Tamposi; Jonathan Bellion; Michael Pollack; Dua Lipa
- Producers: Andrew Watt; The Monsters & Strangerz

Miley Cyrus singles chronology
| "Midnight Sky" (2020) | "Prisoner" (2020) | "Angels like You" (2021) |

Dua Lipa singles chronology
| "Fever" (2020) | "Prisoner" (2020) | "Real Groove" (Studio 2054 remix) (2020) |

Music video
- "Prisoner" on YouTube

"Prisoner" is a song by American singer Miley Cyrus featuring English singer Dua Lipa. It was released on November 19, 2020, through RCA Records as the second single from Cyrus' seventh studio album Plastic Hearts (2020). It was also included on the re-issue of Lipa's second studio album Future Nostalgia: The Moonlight Edition (2021). A dark pop, disco-punk, disco-rock, glam rock and nu-disco song, it was produced by Andrew Watt and the Monsters & Strangerz.

The music video was released on the same day as the single and was co-directed by Cyrus and Alana O'Herlihy. It features the singers driving a tour bus and draws references to the films The Rocky Horror Picture Show and Female Trouble. "Prisoner" received mostly positive reviews from music critics, though some of them deemed it one of the weaker moments of the album. The song reached number one in Bulgaria, Croatia, and Malta, the top ten in ten additional countries, and the top forty in nineteen additional countries. It also peaked at number 12 on the Billboard Global 200 and number 54 on the US Billboard Hot 100.

== Background and release ==
Following the October 2019 release of her single "Don't Start Now", Dua Lipa confirmed that she and Miley Cyrus were planning on recording a collaboration. In May of the following year, Lipa stated that she and Cyrus had decided to scrap their collaboration and record something different. On September 14, 2020, Cyrus confirmed the collaboration with Lipa and that it would be included on her seventh studio album, Plastic Hearts. At the beginning of October, after being spotted shooting a video together in New York City, rumblings that Cyrus and Lipa were working on a secret project got even bigger. In an interview with Spanish radio station Cadena 100 on October 13, 2020, Cyrus stated that due to her and Lipa's fans "begging" for their collaboration to be released, they "[could] expect something pretty soon". On November 13, 2020, Cyrus announced the song's title as "Prisoner", along with the Plastic Hearts track listing reveal. Cyrus began teasing the single in a series of tweets where she confirmed its release and posted videos of her fans reacting to its music video. Cyrus and Lipa announced the release of the song on November 18, 2020. The song was released on November 19. The song was written by the two singers alongside Andrew Wotman, Jordan K. Johnson, Marcus Lomax, Stefan Johnson, Ali Tamposi, Jonathan Bellion, Michael Pollack with production from Andrew Watt and The Monsters & Strangerz. The song was engineered at Gold Tooth Music in Los Angeles and Glenwood Studios in Burbank, California. Mixing took place at MixStar Studios in Virginia Beach, Virginia while the mastering was done at Sterling Sound in New York City. "Prisoner" was later included in Lipa's 2021 reissue of her Future Nostalgia album, titled The Moonlight Edition.

In an interview with Zane Lowe for Apple Music, Cyrus said they had worked on other songs together in the past and praised Lipa:

For her and I, there's just no competition. That changes just everything. There's a true partnership. Then I also liked that it wasn't the first song we'd cut together. We actually cut other songs. She wanted to keep going until it was right, until we found the one that honors our individuality. [...] We just waited until we felt like, 'Now this is Dua-Miley song. You can just, everything about it reflects us.' I mean, there's even something to me, like how I talk about like fashion being a way to flip yourself inside out. The colors that I see, when I listen to a song, I see colors. Some people's charisma is really overwhelming. I see, when Dua's around, that her charisma, there's no sense of desperation to it, like, 'I've got to be the best because if I'm not what if...' There's a calmness to her success, which I really like. Because I feel like when you can tell someone is too much of a... or a survivalist. That I don't like.

In 2025, Cyrus revealed on the Every Single Album podcast that the collaboration with Lipa on Plastic Hearts wasn't her idea, adding the song "isn't cohesive with the album". Cyrus said Lipa's involvement was at the insistence of her record label at the time, who she claims was not pleased with the direction of the album. She felt a Lipa collaboration would have been more appropriate for her follow-up album, Endless Summer Vacation (2023).

== Composition and lyrics ==
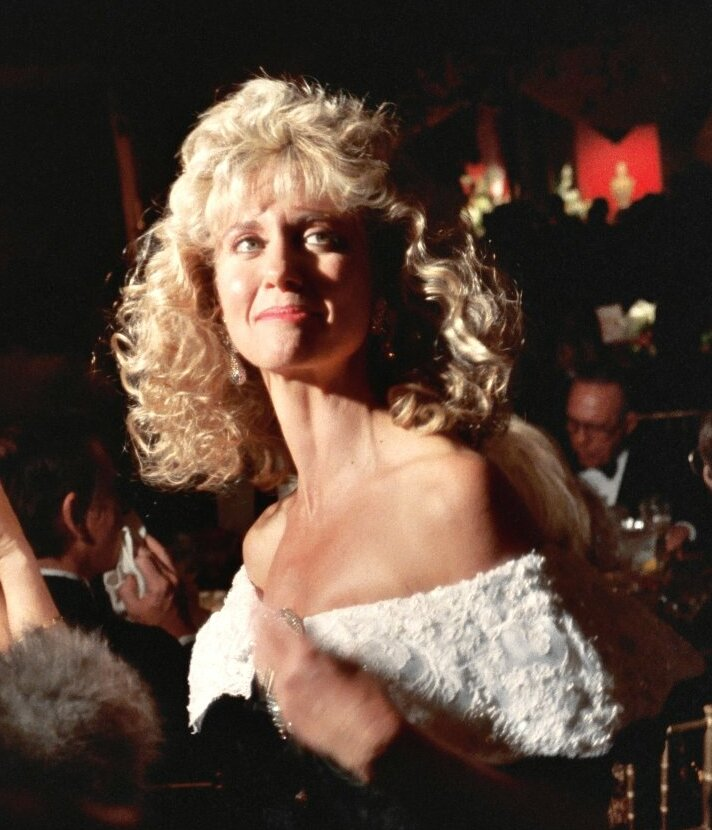
"Prisoner" draws influence from Olivia Newton-John's "Physical" (1981). Dua Lipa, who features on Cyrus's track, already sampled it earlier in 2020, in her own song called "Physical".

Cyrus described "Prisoner" as a perfect blend of her and Lipa's styles. It is a dark-pop, disco-punk, disco-rock, glam rock and nu-disco track with a length of two minutes and forty nine seconds. The song draws influence from and references Olivia Newton-John's 1981 single "Physical". Earlier in 2020, the track was already sampled by Dua Lipa in her own song, also called "Physical". "Prisoner" was composed using 4/4 in the key of E♭ minor, with a moderately-fast tempo of 126–132 beats per minute. Cyrus' and Lipa's vocals range from the low note of B♭_{3} to the high note of C♯_{5}.

The lyrics to "Prisoner" relate to angst inspired by isolation feelings and were described by critics as a "heartache anthem" and a "glam declaration of independence". In an article about the song's lyrics for Elle, Alyssa Bailey described the track as "a dark song that captures what it's like to be trapped in an unhealthy, manipulative relationship where their partner keeps pulling them back". Some parallels can be drawn between the lyrics to "Prisoner" and Cyrus' old songs. The verse: "I try to replace it with the city lights" is an allusion to Cyrus' 2019 song "Slide Away", about her separation from then-husband Liam Hemsworth, on which she sings: "So won't you slide away?/Back to the ocean, I'll go back to the city lights". Another reference to an old Cyrus song can be found in the pre-chorus where she sings: "You keep making it harder to stay", which is a contrast to the lyrics to her 2010 song "Stay" that contains the lyric "And if you ask me, I will stay".

As "Prisoner" was released during the COVID-19 pandemic, Cyrus felt that it also reflects being in quarantine: "I mean, in a way... I feel too, I mean, we're just trapped in our emotions right now. I mean, really me, there's no escaping it. It's like, 'Locked up, can't get you off my mind.' Anything that you've tried to suppress or compartmentalize at that point, it's coming up. It's yours to own, to own it or release it."

== Critical reception ==
Ali Shutler of NME gave the song five out of five stars, calling it "a disco-punk anthem that goes off like a cherry bomb", stating that it "hit[s] the sour-sweet spot between grit and glam" and described Lipa as "the perfect partner in crime for [Cyrus], as they take the basement snarl of punk and give it some '80s disco swagger". Shutler also remarked that "the track gives [Lipa]'s excitably shiny Future Nostalgia space to shine without forcing [Cyrus] out of the spotlight", further praising the artists for "elevat[ing] each other rather than competing" and added: "If only every collaboration had this balance." The New York Times' team of music critics ranked "Prisoner" as the most notable song of the week in their weekly updated column "The Playlist", where Lindsay Zoladz called the track "truly outrageous" and stated that Cyrus and Lipa "make a harmonious pair". Justin Curto from Vulture called the collaboration "a match made in '70s heaven". Eli Enis from Consequence said that "the two stars exude a natural chemistry" on "Prisoner", even though "the pairing is a little bit unusual on paper". Mike Wass of Idolator remarked that Cyrus' previous single "'Midnight Sky' set the bar exceedingly high, but Miley Cyrus proves that lightning (or pop genius) can strike twice with 'Prisoner'", pointed the inspiration by "the unique fusion of pop, dance and rock that briefly occurred in the early 1980s" in Cyrus' Plastic Hearts era and stated that "there are elements of all three genres in 'Prisoner' which wouldn't sound out of place sandwiched between Pat Benatar and Blondie on '80s playlist". Erica Gonzalez from Harper's Bazaar praised "Prisoner" calling it a "killer collaboration" and saying "the song itself also evokes a gritty, vintage feel". Jon Blistein of Rolling Stone wrote that the track "perfectly splits the difference between Dua Lipa's neo-disco-pop and the late-Seventies/early-Eighties rock vibe that's defined Cyrus' Plastic Hearts era".

Claire Shaffer, also from Rolling Stone was less positive, writing that "one area where the album falters" is the collaborations, as "they feel more than a little tacked on", thinking that "Prisoner" would be a better fit to Lipa's Future Nostalgia album. The Guardian's Alexis Petridis compared "Prisoner" unfavorably to its music video and Lipa's solo songs from the same year, opining it is "far less interesting than its blood-spattered, spider-eating, John Waters-quoting video: its sound isn't a million miles from Lipa's own Future Nostalgia, but the song itself isn't anything like as strong as that album's hits. Dan DeLuca of The Philadelphia Inquirer brought up "Prisoner" with its eight credited writers as an example for how Plastic Hearts "suffers from ordinary, by-committee songwriting". In her album review, Katie Tymochenko of Exclaim! opined that Cyrus's confidence is "overshadowed by large-scale dance numbers", "Prisoner" and "Gimme What I Want", and added: "Longtime fans might appreciate these contributions, but, for most people, there's nothing here that's not already overplayed on the radio." In Beats Per Minute's evaluation of Plastic Hearts, "Prisoner" is where "it becomes clear that this isn't Miley's Coral Fang. The duet with Dua Lipa is the straight '80s throwback'-track we've heard many times this decade, a typical referential single that any Gen-X'er could call out." Variety's A. D. Amorosi felt that "Prisoner" was lacking in originality and catchiness, calling it "a surprise, spun-synth-sugar mess, with Cyrus' voice neutered by AutoTune and Lipa's listless vocal lines blurred in its mix.

== Music video ==
=== Background and release ===
The music video for "Prisoner" was filmed over two days from September 30 to October 1, 2020, in Brooklyn. The video was co-directed by Cyrus and Alana O'Herlihy. On November 18, 2020, Cyrus teased the music video release on her social media with a 20-second clip where the two artists are seen, covered in blood, partying it up and eating cherries. On November 19, the next day, the video premiered on YouTube alongside the song's release and it was described by Liam Hess of Vogue as "packed with grunge-inspired fashion and enough black eyeliner to make [Joan] Jett herself jealous".

=== Synopsis ===
The road trip-inspired video begins with Cyrus' mouth singing the first verses of the song with a visual reference to the 1975 film The Rocky Horror Picture Show. Performing as unnamed rockstars, the clip follows with Cyrus and Lipa driving a tour bus together, where the two then vamp it up and party in the back of the bus like an 1980s rock band. During the party it can be seen both of them dancing and smoking together until Cyrus dumps a jar of maraschino cherries down her face, making it look like she is covered in blood. Right after that, Cyrus and Lipa start grinding on, licking each other's bodies and singing the song's chorus face to face. Subsequently, the video portrays the duo arriving at a dive bar and delivering a riotous show with Lipa giving the audience the middle finger while wearing an ultra-rare 1990s Gucci cut-out dress designed by Tom Ford. Lastly, a message pops up onscreen: "In loving memory of all my exes, eat shit". The video ends with an extraction of John Waters' film Female Trouble, in which Divine's character Dawn Davenport says, "I'm a free woman now and my life is ready to begin".

=== Reception ===
After calling it "truly outrageous" and "blood-splattered", Lindsay Zoladz of The New York Times drew parallels between the video and two classic films: "Rock of Love: Thelma & Louise? The Runaways biopic if it were directed by Ozzy Osbourne?", she reflected in her review of the song. Similarly, Ali Shutler of NME pointed that the video is "packed with attitude and big on Thelma & Louise energy" in a five out of five stars review. Sydney Bucksbaum of Entertainment Weekly described the video as "a sexy, bloody road trip" and Eli Enis of Consequence stated that "the two stars exude a natural chemistry". Justin Curto of Vulture praised the video saying: "emotionally and physically, however, they are quite free, dancing and licking each other on the bus before rocking out at a dive bar together." Mehera Bonner of Cosmopolitan pointed the final scene with a message to Cyrus' and Lipa's exes as the standout moment of the video, calling it "iconique". Wonderland magazine called it "already iconic", "a trip itself" and noticed its "references to Jennifer's Body, The Runaways and even The Rocky Horror Picture Show, we're also getting mad Thelma & Louise vibes, just without any death defying cliff jumps (as of yet)." Erica Gonzalez of Harper's Bazaar praised its visuals saying it "exude[s] pure raunchy, '80s rock 'n' roll vibes, complete with mullets, a disheveled tour bus, and ripped fishnet tights" and further commented "they play up the old-school aesthetic with film footage, heavy eye makeup, and layers and layers of jewels".

== Live performances ==
Cyrus performed "Prisoner" first time without Lipa on the first episode of the Amazon Music Holiday Plays digital concert series on December 1. Later she performed on The Howard Stern Show. She again performed "Prisoner" on Jimmy Kimmel Live! on December 7. Cyrus performed "Prisoner" on the newest episode of the YouTube series Released on December 10. Cyrus again performed "Prisoner" along with "Party in the U.S.A." and "Edge of Midnight (Midnight Sky Remix)" on Dick Clark's New Year's Rockin' Eve with Ryan Seacrest in Times Square on December 31. Cyrus again performed "Prisoner" along with "Golden G String" and a cover of "Fade Into You" by Mazzy Star on Tiny Desk Concert hosted by NPR Music on January 28, 2021. Cyrus performed "Prisoner" along with several songs off Plastic Hearts at 2021 Super Bowl with TikTok Tailgate.

== Awards and nominations ==
| Year | Organization | Award | Result | Ref. |
|---|---|---|---|---|
| 2021 | MTV Video Music Awards | Best Collaboration | Nominated | |
| 2021 | MTV Video Music Awards | Best Editing | Nominated | |
| 2021 | MTV Millennial Awards Brazil | Feat Gringo | Nominated | |

== Track listings ==
- Digital download and streaming
1. "Prisoner" (featuring Dua Lipa) – 2:49
- Digital download and streaming – Jax Jones remix
1. "Prisoner" (featuring Dua Lipa) [Jax Jones remix] – 3:46

== Personnel ==
- Miley Cyrus – vocals, backing vocals, executive production
- Dua Lipa – vocals, backing vocals
- Andrew Watt – production, executive production, backing vocals, bass, drums, guitar, keyboards
- The Monsters & Strangerz – production, backing vocals, keyboards
- Jonathan Bellion – backing vocals, additional production
- Michael Pollack – backing vocals
- Paul LaMalfa – engineering
- Serban Ghenea – mixing
- John Hanes – engineering for mix
- Randy Merrill – mastering

== Charts ==
=== Weekly charts ===
Weekly chart performance for "Prisoner"
| Chart (2020–2021) | Peak position |
|---|---|
| Argentina Hot 100 (Billboard) | 48 |
| Australia (ARIA) | 13 |
| Austria (Ö3 Austria Top 40) | 15 |
| Belgium (Ultratop 50 Flanders) | 28 |
| Belgium (Ultratop 50 Wallonia) | 31 |
| Bulgaria Airplay (PROPHON) | 1 |
| Canada Hot 100 (Billboard) | 17 |
| Canada AC (Billboard) | 49 |
| Canada CHR/Top 40 (Billboard) | 17 |
| Canada Hot AC (Billboard) | 26 |
| CIS Airplay (TopHit) | 69 |
| Croatia International Airplay (HRT) | 1 |
| Czech Republic Airplay (ČNS IFPI) | 43 |
| Czech Republic Singles Digital (ČNS IFPI) | 14 |
| Denmark (Tracklisten) | 18 |
| El Salvador (Monitor Latino) | 17 |
| Finland (Suomen virallinen lista) | 15 |
| France (SNEP) | 76 |
| Germany (GfK) | 20 |
| Germany Airplay (BVMI) | 1 |
| Global 200 (Billboard) | 12 |
| Global Excl. US (Billboard) | 10 |
| Greece (IFPI) | 5 |
| Guatemala Anglo (Monitor Latino) | 1 |
| Hungary (Rádiós Top 40) | 2 |
| Hungary (Single Top 40) | 7 |
| Hungary (Stream Top 40) | 7 |
| Iceland (Tónlistinn) | 19 |
| Ireland (IRMA) | 5 |
| Israel International Airplay (Media Forest) | 18 |
| Italy (FIMI) | 34 |
| Japan Hot Overseas (Billboard Japan) | 7 |
| Lebanon (Lebanese Top 20) | 19 |
| Lithuania (AGATA) | 4 |
| Mexico (Billboard Mexican Airplay) | 7 |
| Netherlands (Dutch Top 40) | 10 |
| Netherlands (Single Top 100) | 20 |
| New Zealand (Recorded Music NZ) | 24 |
| Norway (VG-lista) | 11 |
| Panama Anglo (Monitor Latino) | 8 |
| Peru Anglo (Monitor Latino) | 9 |
| Poland Airplay (ZPAV) | 4 |
| Portugal (AFP) | 13 |
| Portugal Airplay (AFP) | 14 |
| Romania (Airplay 100) | 69 |
| San Marino (SMRRTV Top 50) | 11 |
| Singapore (RIAS) | 27 |
| Slovakia Airplay (ČNS IFPI) | 11 |
| Slovakia Singles Digital (ČNS IFPI) | 10 |
| Slovenia (SloTop50) | 15 |
| Spain (Promusicae) | 26 |
| Sweden (Sverigetopplistan) | 23 |
| Switzerland (Schweizer Hitparade) | 11 |
| UK Singles (Official Charts) | 8 |
| US Billboard Hot 100 | 54 |
| US Adult Pop Airplay (Billboard) | 21 |
| US Pop Airplay (Billboard) | 23 |
| US Rolling Stone Top 100 | 18 |

=== Year-end charts ===
Year-end chart performance for "Prisoner"
| Chart (2021) | Position |
|---|---|
| Canada (Canadian Hot 100) | 72 |
| Chile (Monitor Latino) | 35 |
| Croatia (ARC Top 100) | 34 |
| Denmark (Tracklisten) | 90 |
| Germany (Official German Charts) | 90 |
| Global 200 (Billboard) | 98 |
| Hungary (Rádiós Top 40) | 14 |
| Hungary (Stream Top 40) | 53 |
| Netherlands (Dutch Top 40) | 83 |
| Poland (ZPAV) | 60 |
| Portugal (AFP) | 151 |
| UK Singles (OCC) | 82 |

== Certifications ==
Certifications and sales for "Prisoner"
| Region | Certification | Certified units/sales |
|---|---|---|
| Australia (ARIA) | 2× Platinum | 140,000^{‡} |
| Austria (IFPI Austria) | Platinum | 30,000^{‡} |
| Belgium (BRMA) | Gold | 20,000^{‡} |
| Brazil (Pro-Música Brasil) | 2× Diamond | 320,000^{‡} |
| Canada (Music Canada) | Gold | 40,000^{‡} |
| Denmark (IFPI Danmark) | Platinum | 90,000^{‡} |
| France (SNEP) | Gold | 100,000^{‡} |
| Germany (BVMI) | Gold | 200,000^{‡} |
| Italy (FIMI) | Platinum | 70,000^{‡} |
| Mexico (AMPROFON) | Platinum | 140,000^{‡} |
| New Zealand (RMNZ) | 2× Platinum | 60,000^{‡} |
| Norway (IFPI Norway) | Gold | 30,000^{‡} |
| Poland (ZPAV) | Platinum | 20,000^{‡} |
| Portugal (AFP) | 2× Platinum | 20,000^{‡} |
| Spain (Promusicae) | Platinum | 60,000^{‡} |
| Switzerland (IFPI Switzerland) | Gold | 10,000^{‡} |
| United Kingdom (BPI) | Platinum | 600,000^{‡} |
| United States (RIAA) | Platinum | 1,000,000^{‡} |
Streaming
| Greece (IFPI Greece) | Gold | 1,000,000^{†} |
| Sweden (GLF) | Gold | 4,000,000^{†} |
^{‡} Sales+streaming figures based on certification alone.^{†} Streaming-only figures based on certification alone.

== Release history ==
Release dates and formats for "Prisoner"
| Region | Date | Format(s) | Version | Label | Ref. |
|---|---|---|---|---|---|
| Various | November 19, 2020 | Digital download; streaming | Original | RCA | |
| United States | November 24, 2020 | Contemporary hit radio | Original | RCA | |
| United States | December 7, 2020 | Adult contemporary radio | Original | RCA | |
| Italy | December 11, 2020 | Radio airplay | Original | Sony | |
| Various | February 5, 2021 | Digital download; streaming | Jax Jones remix | RCA | |
