= Plastic Hearts =

Studio album by Miley Cyrus
- Released: November 27, 2020
- Recorded: 2018–2020
- Studios: Gold Tooth Music (Los Angeles, California); Kitchy Studio (London); Abbey Road Studios (London); Glenwood Place Studios (Burbank, California); Bonnie Hill Studios (Los Angeles, California); Tileyard (London); Rockhouse Studios (Long Beach, New York); Zelig Studios (London); Shangri-La (Malibu, California); Electric Lady Studios (New York City, New York)
- Genres: Rock; pop; synth-pop; glam rock
- Length: 38:15
- Label: RCA
- Producers: Louis Bell; Emile Haynie; The Monsters & Strangerz; Happy Perez; Mark Ronson; Take a Daytrip; Andrew Watt; Andrew Wyatt

Miley Cyrus chronology
She Is Coming (2019)	Plastic Hearts (2020)	Attention: Miley Live (2022)

Singles from Plastic Hearts
- 1. "Midnight Sky" Released: August 14, 2020; 2. "Prisoner" Released: November 19, 2020; 3. "Angels like You" Released: March 12, 2021

Plastic Hearts is the seventh studio album by American singer Miley Cyrus. It was released on November 27, 2020, by RCA Records, and was her final album with the label; she signed with Columbia Records in early 2021. Marking a departure from Cyrus' previous releases, Plastic Hearts is primarily a rock, pop, synth-pop, and glam rock record, with influences from country, punk rock, new wave, arena rock, industrial, disco, and power pop. Most of the album was produced by Andrew Watt and Louis Bell, with further collaboration with Mark Ronson and Andrew Wyatt. Guest vocals include Dua Lipa, Billy Idol, Joan Jett and Stevie Nicks.

Plastic Hearts charted at number one in Canada and within the top five in Australia, Ireland, Lithuania, New Zealand, Norway, Scotland, Spain, Switzerland, the United Kingdom, and the United States. It received positive reviews from music critics, who felt the sonic direction suited Cyrus well. Three singles were released from the album: "Midnight Sky", "Prisoner", and "Angels Like You".

== Background ==
"[Younger Now] was obviously a little bit more country influenced, but I still really love pop music and I love music that can be played at the club."

— Cyrus on her shift in musical direction since Younger Now (2017)

Feeling distant from the mainstream urban culture she explored on Bangerz (2013) and the musical experimentalism of Miley Cyrus & Her Dead Petz (2015), Cyrus decided to go for "rootsy" country music elements while making her sixth studio album Younger Now (2017). The album was released on September 29, 2017, to lukewarm critical and commercial performance. It received an average score of 58 out of 100 on Metacritic, and debuted at number two on the US Billboard 200 with first-week sales of 60,000 album-equivalent units. Its lead single "Malibu" became her ninth top-ten single on the US Billboard Hot 100, while the title track peaked at number 79. Cyrus confirmed there would be no further singles only one month after the album was released and that she would not be touring for it.

Two weeks prior to Younger Now being released, Cyrus claimed that she was "over [the album]" and was "already two songs deep on the next one"; however, she later said that she began working on the album in early 2018. In December 2018, Cyrus acknowledged that the musical direction of Younger Now "wasn't exactly the home for [her]" and credited Ronson with "[helping her] carve out [her] sound, where [she] could do everything that [she wanted], which is more modern." Cyrus later cited Britney Spears and Metallica as musical influences on the album.

== Development and release ==
"My record is called She Is Miley Cyrus. 'She' does not represent a gender. She is not just a woman. 'She' doesn't refer to a vagina. She is a force of nature. She is power. She can be anything you want to be, therefore, she is everything. She is the super she. She is the she-ro. She is the She-E-O."

— Cyrus describing the meaning of the album's original title

In November 2018, Cyrus announced she was collaborating with Ronson, and continued work on her forthcoming record. Cyrus and Ronson told Matt Wilkinson of Beats 1 that they were "80% done" with their albums, and tentatively planned for Cyrus' project to be released in June 2019.

Cyrus held a private listening session of the album for iHeartRadio executives upon announcing its completion in May. On May 9, Cyrus announced on social media she would be releasing new music on May 30, and later stated the rollout of her new music would be "unconventional". On May 31, Cyrus tweeted that the album would be titled She Is Miley Cyrus, and that it would be preceded by three six-track extended plays: She Is Coming on May 31, She Is Here in the summer, and She Is Everything in the fall. Cyrus described the three EPs as "different [chapters] to a trilogy" that together would form the full-length album. Their track listings were to be "seasonal" in nature; she related She Is Coming to "[wanting to feel] light and feel the warmth" of early summer, and She Is Here and She Is Everything to being "colder and a little darker" as the release cycle was to extend into the fall. She Is Here was inspired by "the present of where [Cyrus is] at", while She Is Everything was to be comparatively more ballad-driven. She later explained that the "she" pronoun in the album title described the "most confident version of herself".

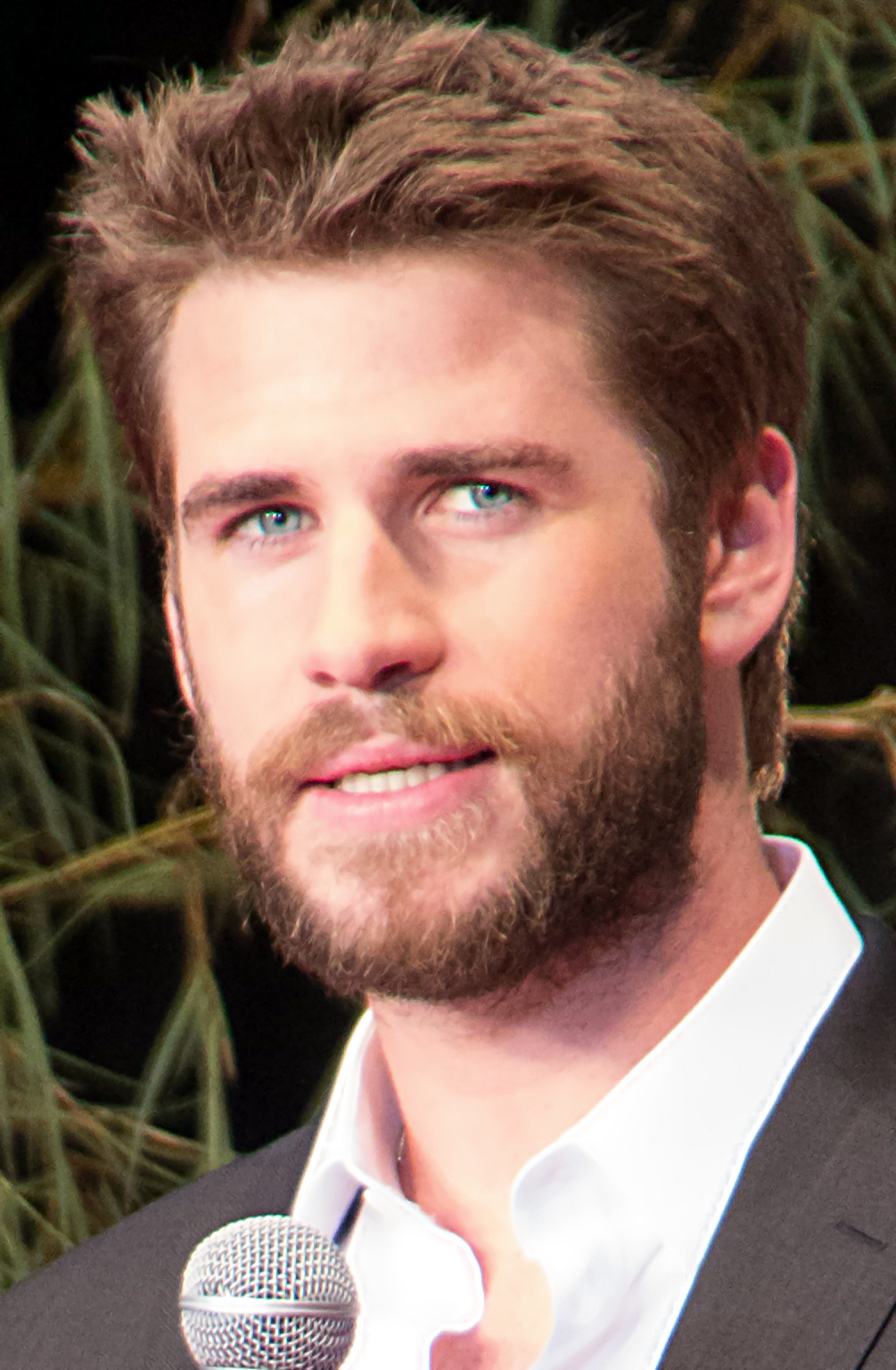
Plastic Hearts was primarily written about Cyrus' lead-up to her divorce with Liam Hemsworth (pictured).

Cyrus continued work on the record following her separation from then-husband Liam Hemsworth in August. The following month, it was reported that Cyrus was undecided between updating the existing album that was completed before her divorce or scrapping that version of the record altogether. On October 20, it was speculated from Cyrus' Instagram Live video that the release date for the full-length album was scheduled for her birthday on November 23, 2019. On November 3, Ronson stated that Cyrus' collaborations with him were tentatively planned to be released before the end of that year. On November 9, however, it was reported that Cyrus' new music would be delayed until early 2020 due to her vocal cord surgery earlier that month.

On New Year's Day 2020, Cyrus uploaded a highlight video of the past decade and announced that "[the] new era starts now". She stated "[she was] getting super close [and was] feeling the urgency" during an interview with DJ Smallzy on March 4. She posted a clip of the music video for her song "Start All Over" with the hashtags "#sheiscoming" and "#butforrealthistime" on August 4. With the release of the single "Midnight Sky" on August 14, Cyrus confirmed the cancellation of the She Is Here and She Is Everything EPs, stating "this year has been extremely unexpected [and] I guess I was feeling like it didn't make sense for me to continue the next two projects." She stated she did not have plans to release the full-length album in the near future because "when you write a record, a lot of the time, you're writing your experiences, and then by the time the record comes out, you've evolved past that experience" whereas releasing standalone singles "allows you to talk to your fans in real time". She later claimed she would wait until she could tour again to release the record, however the album was later reported to be released in November. On October 23, Cyrus announced the album's new title to be Plastic Hearts and that it would be released on November 27; it became available for preorder that day.

=== Artwork ===
The album artwork for Plastic Hearts was photographed by Mick Rock, who is widely known for his work with artists including Joan Jett and Debbie Harry. It was the last album cover taken by Rock who died in 2021. The standard cover includes the name of the album written sideways and an image of Cyrus with a pink filter, reminiscent of the cover of Generation X's 1981 album, Kiss Me Deadly. There are also limited edition copies from Cyrus' website featuring black-and-white and full color variants. Cyrus is pictured on the cover with a blonde mullet, wearing a Jean Paul Gaultier sleeveless black-and-white shirt with the word "censored" printed on it, and accessorized with silver jewelry.

== Composition ==
=== Influences ===
In terms of musical influence, Cyrus described the album as "[having] kind of everything". She later explained that she considers it to be "genderless" and a "mosaic of all the things [she's] been in before" in an interview for Vanity Fair. She compared her work with Ronson to "rocked, modern Debbie Harry or Joan Jett", while her respective collaborations with Mike Will Made It and Wyatt brought elements of hip hop and alternative pop. In September 2020, the singer cited the band Metallica and singer Britney Spears as influences for the album.

=== Music and lyrics ===
Plastic Hearts' opening track "WTF Do I Know" was described by British Vogue as "a galloping rock stomper that recalls the stop-start rhythm of The Strokes with a tinge of glam rock", with People magazine describing its lyrics as "Cyrus singing about the uncertainty of life and is a clear nod to Hemsworth, 30, who she split from last year." Cyrus stated the song is "not that it's how I feel every second of the day, it's how I felt for a moment". The title track "Plastic Hearts" "opts for a more jam-orientated rock flavour, slowly blooming out of a piano and percussion intro". "Angels like You", the album's third track, was compared by British Vogue to Cyrus' 2013 single "Wrecking Ball", where "Cyrus glides between fragile heartbreak ("Won't call me by name, only baby") in the verses, to a full-throated roar of defiance on the sky-scraping chorus ("I know that you're wrong for me, gonna wish we never met on the day I leave"), with Cosmopolitan referring to Cyrus' 2019 relationship with Kaitlynn Carter as the song's lyrical inspiration.

Second single "Prisoner" was described by NME as a "heartache anthem" and "is a glam declaration of independence". The theme of independence is shared with "Midnight Sky", in which Cyrus is said to be "tak[ing] back her narrative" and being confident in herself. Fifth track "Gimme What I Want" shows industrial influences and reflects on the singer's choice of giving herself to someone else but if they don't want it, she'd be alright by herself. The track received many comparisons to Nine Inch Nails.

Eighth track "High", co-produced by Mark Ronson and co-written with Caitlyn Smith, is a country ballad that "channels the rustic, singsong around the campfire varnished hurt of the A Star Is Born soundtrack". "Hate Me" is a bittersweet song that shows Cyrus making the blame for busted romance. The track has also been interpreted as a response to the negative press about Cyrus and a reflection on how the media attention surrounding her would suddenly become positive if she died.

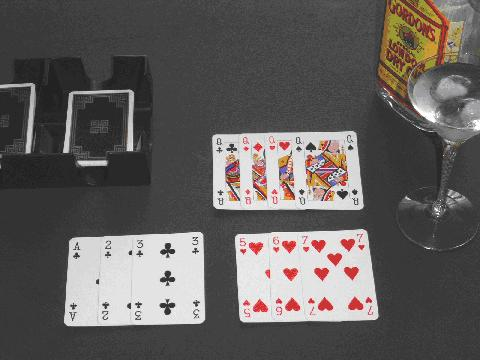
The game Gin Rummy is mentioned in the last track of the album as a metaphor for the powerful men of the world.

Tenth track "Bad Karma" features Joan Jett on vocals and Angel Olsen on guitar. It is a high-camp panto of '80s hard rock, which finds Cyrus and Jett trading one-liners over one of the record's few live drum tracks with the singer lightly playing with her own self-image ("I've always picked a giver 'cause I've always been the taker"). "Never Be Me" was compared to a ballad from the 1980s and "over a bubbling synth pulse, Cyrus lays out what she will and won't do vis-à-vis new relationships. So, "If you're looking for faithful, that'll never be me" later morphs into the climactic, heart-bursting, "If you think that I'm someone to give up and leave, that'll never be me".

Closing track "Golden G String", classified by many critics as the most complex, according to Cyrus, is "reflective of Donald Trump as president and the men hold all the cards -- and they ain't playing gin, and they determine your fate." Co-written only with its producer Andrew Wyatt, the track also sees Cyrus reflecting about her mid-2010s antics on lines like "I was tryin' to own my power/Still I'm tryin' to work it out/And at least it gives the paper somethin' they can write about".

== Promotion ==
=== Live performances ===
Cyrus performed "Angels Like You", "High", "Plastic Hearts" and "Golden G String" for an exclusive Backyard Sessions released on November 27, along her album on Apple Music. She then performed "Plastic Hearts", "Midnight Sky", and "Prisoner" on the first episode of the Amazon Music Holiday Plays digital concert series on December 1, 2020. She sang "Golden G String" at NPR's Tiny Desk Concert on January 28, 2021. The singer performed "Angels Like You" for a special Rehearsal - Behind the Scenes YouTube video, of her Pre Super Bowl Show, on February 3, 2021. She gave a performance consisting of the tracks "Plastic Hearts", "Midnight Sky", "Prisoner", "High", "Angels Like You", "Bad Karma" and "Night Crawling" during the TikTok Tailgate pre-game concert before Super Bowl LV in Tampa, Florida on February 7, 2021. The singer performed "Plastic Hearts" at Saturday Night Live on May 8, 2021. "Hate Me" and "Gimme What I Want" was performed next on June 10, 2021, on Magnum's 8D Special Performance. Cyrus performed "Plastic Hearts", "Midnight Sky", at Resort Las Vegas Grand Opening on July 4, 2021. On July 29, she sang "Midnight Sky", "Angels Like You", "WTF Do I Know", "Plastic Hearts" and "Night Crawling" at the Lollapalooza festival.

=== Singles ===
Plastic Hearts was made available for pre-order on October 24, 2020, with three songs available to download. These were lead single "Midnight Sky", live covers of "Heart of Glass" (originally released September 29, 2020) and "Zombie". "Edge of Midnight (Midnight Sky Remix)", a mash-up of "Midnight Sky" with Stevie Nicks' song "Edge of Seventeen" was released as the fourth pre-release download on November 6, 2020.

"Prisoner", featuring Dua Lipa, was released as the album's second single on November 19, 2020. The music video was released the same day. A remix of the song was released later on.

"Angels Like You" was released as the third single from the album. The music video for the song was released on March 8, 2021, was co-directed by Cyrus and Alana O'Herlihy and contains footage taken from singer's Super Bowl pre-game performance on February 7, 2021. Sony Music serviced it to contemporary hit radio stations in Australia on March 12. British radio station BBC Radio 1 added "Angels Like You" to rotation on March 20, and the record label sent it to contemporary hit stations in Italy on April 9, 2021.

== Critical reception ==
Professional ratings
Aggregate scores
Source	Rating
AnyDecentMusic?	7.0/10
Metacritic	75/100
Review scores
Source	Rating
AllMusic	4/5 stars
Clash	8/10
Exclaim!	7/10
The Guardian	3/5 stars
The Independent	4/5 stars
The Line of Best Fit	8/10
MusicOMH	4/5 stars
NME	4/5 stars
Pitchfork	6.4/10
Rolling Stone	4/5 stars

Upon release, the album was met with positive reviews from music critics. At Metacritic, which assigns a normalized rating out of 100 to reviews from mainstream critics, the album has an average score of 75, indicating "generally favorable reviews".

Katie Tymochenko of Exclaim! described Plastic Hearts as "Cyrus' gateway into the world of rock", but stated that "although she's proven herself to be a musical chameleon throughout all aspects of her career, Cyrus still caters to her pop following that's been with her since day one". El Hunt of NME said that Cyrus was reflecting her Black Mirror character Ashley O in her transition from teen pop star to rock star, and complimented the "glam-rock tendencies" of "Prisoner" and "industrial undercurrent" of "Gimme What I Want". Elly Watson of DIY praised her new musical direction saying "Overall, Miley's seventh era seems to be the one that suits her best". Bella Fleming of The Line of Best Fit also praised Cyrus' new found independence and passion, saying "with Plastic Hearts, comes a wonderful album about life as a fiercely independent woman. Cyrus has found the perfect balance of pushing her own musical boundaries whilst proving she's one of the strongest and bravest names in the constant celebrity whirlwind."

Reviewing the album for AllMusic, Heather Phares claimed the album to be both "Passionate and self-aware" and that it is "easily the finest incarnation of Cyrus' music yet." Claire Shaffer of Rolling Stone called the album a "karaoke night out that ends up being something more substantial" and pointed that Cyrus "knows exactly what kind of leather-jacket-and-combat-boot show she's putting on here, and her full embrace of rock at its most bombastic, artificial, hair-metal glory is refreshing to say the least". In a positive review, Shaad D'Souza from Pitchfork defined Plastic Hearts as a "genuinely pleasing, though sometimes hamfisted record that staves off the awkwardness and missteps that plagued her previous albums" and said the album's greatest success is that "for the first time in a long time, a Miley Cyrus record is music first, headlines second".

=== Year-end lists ===
Publication	List	Rank	Ref.
Good Morning America	50 Best Albums of 2020	50	
NME	The 50 Best Albums of 2020	32	
Nylon	Top Albums of 2020	—N/a	
People	People's Top 10 Albums of 2020	6	
PopBuzz	The 20 Best Albums of 2020	4	
Rolling Stone	The Best Albums of 2020	23	
Rolling Stone	Rob Sheffield's Top 20 Albums of 2020	14	
Wonderland	The Best Albums of 2020	—N/a	

== Commercial performance ==
The album was a commercial success, although in the United States, physical copies of Plastic Hearts were unavailable on the release date due to major retailers' stock limitations of physical music in anticipation of Black Friday, on which the release date fell. Cyrus stated that she and her team had not been informed of these expected distribution disruptions when selecting "the suggested [November 27] date", adding that she was "equally/if not more frustrated" than her fans. Nevertheless, the album debuted at number two on the US Billboard 200 with 60,000 album-equivalent units, making it her ninth release to chart within the top five and her highest-charting release since Bangerz (2013). During its second week of release, Plastic Hearts dropped to number 12 with sales of 37,500 copies, and dropped to number 20 in its third week after moving 31,000 units. Additionally, the album became Cyrus' first entry and chart-topper on the Billboard Top Rock Albums chart, with seven of its songs entering the Hot Rock & Alternative Songs chart. According to weekly chart data from the Rolling Stone Top 200, Plastic Hearts has moved over 406,000 units in the US since release, as of May 2021.

Plastic Hearts debuted at number four on the UK Albums Chart, with sales of 15,318 units. In Canada, the album debuted atop the Canadian Albums Chart, making it her fourth number-one and ninth top-ten album on the chart.

== Legacy ==
With Plastic Hearts, Cyrus was pointed as one of the top artists who led the commercial resurgence of rock music in 2020–2021. American independent newspaper The Diamondback pointed Cyrus alongside Post Malone as the main current artists who "helped to rebrand rock", stating that she "could very well become the female face of a rock revival". Consequence named Plastic Hearts as a "big pivot to rock in the pop world" along with Poppy's I Disagree. In 2020, close to the album's release, British rock magazine Kerrang! published an article called "Is Pop going Metal?" on which they stated: "Miley Cyrus going rock will bring in legions of new fans to our scene". One year later, the aforementioned magazine listed Cyrus as one of the names who are "offering hope that rock music is slowly-but-surely returning to the centre of popular culture". MTV News writer Katiee McKinstry pointed Plastic Hearts as one of the main things responsible for the return of nostalgia in popular culture, adding that with the record Cyrus "completely reinvented herself as a glam-rock icon, diving into the past as she cleared a path forward in the pop-rock sphere". Upon its release, The New York Times wrote that with Plastic Hearts "rock music has found its most earnest and high-profile millennial ambassador", adding: "Maybe rock's not dead — it's just in the capable hands of Miley Cyrus".

== Track listing ==
Plastic Hearts track listing
No.	Title	Writer(s)	Producer(s)	Length
1.	"WTF Do I Know"	Miley Cyrus; Ryan Tedder; Alexandra Tamposi; Andrew Watt; Louis Bell	Watt; Bell	2:51
2.	"Plastic Hearts"	Cyrus; Tedder; Tamposi; Watt; Bell	Watt; Bell	3:25
3.	"Angels like You"	Cyrus; Tedder; Tamposi; Watt; Bell	Watt; Bell	3:16
4.	"Prisoner" (featuring Dua Lipa)	Cyrus; Lipa; Tamposi; Michael Pollack; Watt; Jordan K. Johnson; Stefan Johnson; Marcus Lomax; Jonathan Bellion	Watt; The Monsters & Strangerz; Bellion^{[a]}	2:49
5.	"Gimme What I Want"	Cyrus; Majid Al-Maskati; Tamposi; Watt; Bell	Watt; Bell	2:31
6.	"Night Crawling" (featuring Billy Idol)	Cyrus; Idol; Tedder; Pollack; Tamposi; Watt; Nathan Perez; Taylor Hawkins	Watt; Happy Perez	3:09
7.	"Midnight Sky"	Cyrus; Ilsey Juber; Bellion; Tamposi; Watt; Bell	Watt; Bell	3:43
8.	"High"	Cyrus; Jennifer Decilveo; Caitlyn Smith	Mark Ronson; Take a Daytrip; Andrew Wyatt	3:16
9.	"Hate Me"	Cyrus; Tamposi; Watt; Bell	Watt; Bell	2:37
10.	"Bad Karma" (featuring Joan Jett)	Cyrus; Juber	Ronson; Kenny Laguna^{[a]}; Picard Brothers^{[a]}	3:08
11.	"Never Be Me"	Cyrus; Juber; Ronson	Ronson; Brandon Bost^{[a]}	3:35
12.	"Golden G String"	Cyrus; Wyatt	Wyatt; Emile Haynie	3:55
Total length:				38:15

Digital and LP bonus tracks
No.	Title	Writer(s)	Producer(s)	Length
13.	"Edge of Midnight (Midnight Sky Remix)" (featuring Stevie Nicks)	Cyrus; Nicks; Tamposi; Juber; Bellion; Watt; Bell	Watt; Bell	3:40
14.	"Heart of Glass" (Live from the iHeart Festival)	Chris Stein; Debbie Harry	Stacy Jones	3:33
15.	"Zombie" (Live from the NIVA Save Our Stage Festival)	Dolores O'Riordan	Jones	4:50
Total length:				50:18

Japanese CD bonus track
No.	Title	Writer(s)	Length
16.	"Who Owns My Heart" (Live from the iHeart Festival)	Cyrus; Antonina Armato; Tim James; Devrim Karaoglu	4:16
Total length:			54:37

=== Notes ===
- ^{^[a]} indicates an additional producer
- Apple Music Backyard Sessions Edition includes four live bonus videos of "High," "Plastic Hearts," "Golden G String," and "Angels like You".

== Personnel ==
Credits adapted from Tidal.

Musicians

- Miley Cyrus – vocals, background vocals
- Andrew Watt – background vocals (1, 2, 4, 6, 7, 9), bass guitar (1–7, 9), drums (1, 3–5, 7, 9), guitar (1–7, 9, 15), percussion (1, 3, 9), keyboards (2, 4–7), piano (3, 6, 9), programming (7)
- Louis Bell – keyboards (1–3, 5, 7, 9), programming (1, 3, 5, 9), piano (2)
- Chad Smith – drums and percussion (2)
- Will Malone – strings (3)
- Dua Lipa – vocals and background vocals (4)
- Jon Bellion – background vocals (4)
- Michael Pollack – background vocals (4), keyboards (6)
- The Monsters & Strangerz – background vocals and keyboards (4)
- Majid Jordan – background vocals (5)
- Paul Lamalfa – programming (5)
- Ali Tamposi – background vocals (6, 7)
- Billy Idol – vocals and background vocals (6)
- Taylor Hawkins – drums (6)
- Happy Perez – keyboards and programming (6)
- Ilsey Juber – background vocals (7)
- Jennifer Decilveo – acoustic guitar (8)
- Leo Abrahams – acoustic and electric guitar (8)
- Mark Ronson – keyboards (8), percussion (8), programming (8), synthesizer (10, 11), guitar (11)
- Take a Daytrip – keyboards and programming (8)
- Riccardo Damian – programming (8)
- Andrew Wyatt – keyboards (8), strings (12)
- Ben Lester – steel guitar (8)
- Joan Jett – vocals and background vocals (10)
- Homer Steinweiss – drums (10, 11)
- Angel Olsen – guitar (10)
- The Picard Brothers – programming (10), synthesizer (10)
- John Carroll Kirby – synthesizer (10, 11)
- Brandon Bost – keyboards (11), programming (11)
- Teo Halm – keyboards (11)
- Justin Cantor – cello (12)
- Emile Haynie – programming (12)
- Mario Gotoh – viola (12)
- Christina Liberis – violin (12)
- Marc Szammer – violin (12)
- Joe Ayoub – bass guitar (14)
- Stacy Jones – drums (14, 15)
- Jamie Arentzen – guitar (14, 15)
- Max Bernstein – guitar (14)
- Mike Schmid – keyboards (14, 15)
- Josh Moreau – bass guitar (15)
- Jaco Caraco – guitar (15)

Technical

- Mark "Spike" Stent – mixing engineer (1–3, 5, 6, 9)
- Şerban Ghenea – mixing engineer (4, 7, 8, 12, 13)
- Tom Elmhirst – mixing engineer (10, 11)
- Brandon Bost – mixing engineer (11), engineer (10)
- Paul David Hager – mixing engineer (14, 15)
- Randy Merrill – mastering engineer (1–12, 14, 15)
- Paul Lamalfa – mastering engineer (13), engineer (1–6, 9), recording engineer (7, 13), vocal engineer (10)
- Geoff Swan – engineer (1–3, 5, 6, 9)
- Louis Bell – engineer (1–3, 5, 9)
- Michael Freeman – engineer (1–3, 5, 6, 9)
- Andrew Dudman – engineer (3)
- Ryan Carline – engineer (3)
- John Hanes – engineer (4, 7, 12, 13), assistant engineer (8)
- Jacob Munk – engineer (10–12)
- Todd Monfalcone – engineer (10), assistant engineer (11)
- Andrew Wyatt – engineer (12), recording engineer (8)
- Riccardo Damian – recording engineer (8), engineer (10, 11)
- Lizzie Arnold – assistant engineer (8)
- Tileyard – assistant engineer (8)
- Matthew Scatchell – assistant engineer (10)
- Tyler Beans – assistant engineer (11)

== Charts ==
=== Weekly charts ===
Chart (2020–2021)	Peak position
Argentine Albums (CAPIF)	8
Australian Albums (ARIA)	3
Austrian Albums (Ö3 Austria)	8
Belgian Albums (Ultratop Flanders)	7
Belgian Albums (Ultratop Wallonia)	9
Canadian Albums (Billboard)	1
Croatian International Albums (HDU)	9
Czech Albums (ČNS IFPI)	14
Danish Albums (Hitlisten)	16
Dutch Albums (Album Top 100)	9
Finnish Albums (Suomen virallinen lista)	7
French Albums (SNEP)	42
German Albums (Offizielle Top 100)	15
Greek Albums (IFPI)	47
Hungarian Albums (MAHASZ)	35
Irish Albums (Official Charts)	3
Italian Albums (FIMI)	9
Lithuanian Albums (AGATA)	3
New Zealand Albums (RMNZ)	2
Norwegian Albums (VG-lista)	5
Polish Albums (ZPAV)	11
Portuguese Albums (AFP)	9
Scottish Albums (Official Charts)	5
Slovak Albums (ČNS IFPI)	18
Spanish Albums (PROMUSICAE)	4
Swedish Albums (Sverigetopplistan)	12
Swiss Albums (Schweizer Hitparade)	4
UK Albums (Official Charts)	4
US Billboard 200	2
US Top Rock Albums (Billboard)	1

=== Year-end charts ===
2020 year-end chart performance for Plastic Hearts
Chart (2020)	Position
Spanish Albums (PROMUSICAE)	94

2021 year-end chart performance for Plastic Hearts
Chart (2021)	Position
Australian Albums (ARIA)	61
Belgian Albums (Ultratop Flanders)	108
Danish Albums (Hitlisten)	77
Dutch Albums (Album Top 100)	76
New Zealand Albums (RMNZ)	38
Spanish Albums (PROMUSICAE)	72
Swedish Albums (Sverigetopplistan)	71
UK Albums (OCC)	99
US Billboard 200	104
US Top Rock Albums (Billboard)	12

== Certifications ==
Certifications for Plastic Hearts
Region	Certification	Certified units/sales
Australia (ARIA)	Gold	35,000^{‡}
Brazil (Pro-Música Brasil)	3× Platinum	120,000^{‡}
Denmark (IFPI Danmark)	Platinum	20,000^{‡}
France (SNEP)	Gold	50,000^{‡}
Italy (FIMI)	Gold	25,000^{‡}
New Zealand (RMNZ)	Platinum	15,000^{‡}
Norway (IFPI Norway)	Gold	10,000^{‡}
Poland (ZPAV)	2× Platinum	40,000^{‡}
Spain (Promusicae)	Gold	20,000^{‡}
Switzerland (IFPI Switzerland)	Gold	10,000^{‡}
United Kingdom (BPI)	Gold	100,000^{‡}
^{‡} Sales+streaming figures based on certification alone.

== Release history ==
Release history for Plastic Hearts
Region	Date	Formats	Labels	Refs.
Various	November 27, 2020	CD; digital download; streaming	RCA	
Japan	December 16, 2020	CD	Sony Music	
Various	July 23, 2021	LP	RCA	

== See also ==
- List of 2020 albums
- List of number-one albums of 2020 (Canada)
- List of UK top-ten albums in 2020
