= D.R.E.A.M. =

2019 song by Miley Cyrus featuring Ghostface Killah

Song by Miley Cyrus featuring Ghostface Killah

from the EP She Is Coming
- Released: May 31, 2019
- Genre: Pop; R&B; alternative hip hop; indie pop
- Length: 2:48
- Label: RCA
- Songwriters: Miley Cyrus; John Cunningham; Ilsey Juber; Clifford Smith; Corey Woods; David Porter; Dennis Coles; Gary Grice; Isaac Hayes; Jason Hunter; Lamont Hawkins; Robert Diggs; Russell Jones
- Producers: John Cunningham; RZA

Music video
- D.R.E.A.M. on YouTube

"D.R.E.A.M." (an acronym for "Drugs Rule Everything Around Me") is a song by American singer Miley Cyrus from her second extended play, She Is Coming (2019). It features guest vocals by American rapper Ghostface Killah, and was written by Cyrus, Killah, John Cunningham, RZA, and Ilsey Juber, while being produced by Cunningham and RZA. It samples Wu-Tang Clan's 1993 song "C.R.E.A.M." throughout, with the group members credited as co-writers.

"D.R.E.A.M." is a pop, R&B, alternative hip hop and indie pop song with elements of trap that references the singer's relationship with drugs. Promotion for the track began with a live debut of the song at BBC Radio 1's Big Weekend on May 27, 2019, and subsequently continued on other music festivals. A one-minute accompanying clip sequence for the song was released on May 31, 2019, through Cyrus' official YouTube channel. It features black and white footage of the singer, wearing a black sheer bra.

== Composition ==
"D.R.E.A.M." is two minutes and forty-eight seconds long. It was written by Cyrus, Ghostface Killah, John Cunningham, RZA, and Ilsey Juber, while its production was done by Cunningham and RZA. It samples Wu-Tang Clan's 1993 song "C.R.E.A.M." throughout, which in turn samples the Charmels' 1967 song, "As Long As I've Got You", with Wu-Tang members credited as co-writers.

It references the singer's relationship with drugs and honors her party lifestyle: "Always last to leave the party/Drugs rule everything around me/Wake up with new tattoos on my body/Drugs rule everything around me/Hit the Goose, raise a toast, pop the molly," she sings in part of the chorus. Killah's verse drops in the outro, offering his own perspective on drug use: "The drugs rule everything around me/You could call me a king/I got it all in my store, you should crown me/Purple Perc, sticky green Mollies, sipping lean."

Cyrus namechecks American boxer Muhammad Ali and country singer and godmother Dolly Parton, while Killah references Michael Jackson's 1982 song "Billie Jean".

== Critical reception ==
Writing for Vulture, Craig Jenkins found that "D.R.E.A.M." "wisely revisits the chipper mood of Miley’s best-loved hits," and that the song's "understated trap production and festive lyrics work well." He also complimented the sequencing of "D.R.E.A.M." with the track "Cattitude", which schedules RuPaul's voice directly after Killah's verse. Erica Gonzales of Harper's Bazaar described the song as "an airy, chilled-out pop tune," and speculated that "Miley got [Wu-Tang Clan's] blessing if she was able to get the sample cleared and managed to get [Killah] to drop a verse in the outro." She also pointed that "considering the amount of backlash Cyrus has received on social media for her take on hip hop during her Bangerz era, it's unclear how this collaboration will ride with rap fans." Nick Levine wrote in NME that the "narco-R&B" song includes a moment when the singer hallucinates that other girls look like Dolly Parton. Mike Neid from Idolator described Killah's verse as "vibe-killing."

== Live performances ==
Cyrus first performed "D.R.E.A.M." at BBC Radio 1's Big Weekend in North Yorkshire on May 27, 2019, four days before the song's release. On May 31, she performed the song at Primavera Sound festival in Barcelona. She also sang "D.R.E.A.M." the following day at the Orange Warsaw Festival in Warsaw.

== Credits and personnel ==
Credits adapted from Tidal.

- Miley Cyrus – main vocals, songwriting
- Ghostface Killah – featured vocals, songwriting
- Ilsey Juber – background vocals, songwriting, record engineering assistance, guitar
- John Cunningham – production, songwriting, mixing engineering, guitar, keyboards, programming
- RZA – production, songwriting
- Method Man – songwriting
- Raekwon – songwriting
- David Porter – songwriting
- GZA – songwriting
- Isaac Hayes – songwriting
- Inspectah Deck – songwriting
- U-God – songwriting
- Ol' Dirty Bastard – songwriting

== Charts ==
Chart (2019)	Peak position
Ireland (IRMA)	77
New Zealand Hot Singles (RMNZ)	9
US Bubbling Under Hot 100 (Billboard)	11
