= Slide Away (Miley Cyrus song) =

2019 single by Miley Cyrus

Single by Miley Cyrus
- Released: August 16, 2019
- Genre: Pop
- Length: 3:53
- Label: RCA
- Songwriters: Miley Cyrus; Alma; Andrew Wyatt; Mike Will Made It
- Producers: Wyatt; Mike Will Made It

Miley Cyrus singles chronology
"Mother's Daughter" (2019)	"Slide Away" (2019)	"Don't Call Me Angel" (2019)

Music video
- "Slide Away" on YouTube

"Slide Away" is a song by American singer Miley Cyrus. It was released as a single on August 16, 2019, by RCA Records. It was written by Cyrus, Alma, and its producers Andrew Wyatt and Mike Will Made It. The song's lyrics discuss the deterioration of a relationship, and are often likened to Cyrus' separation from ex-husband Liam Hemsworth.

"Slide Away" received favorable reviews from music critics. It charted at number 47 on the US Billboard Hot 100. The accompanying music video was released on September 6, 2019.

Originally planned to be the lead single of one of two remaining parts of Cyrus' scrapped 3-part project, the song was added to her previously released second extended play, She Is Coming, on the project's fourth anniversary.

== Composition and lyrics ==
"Slide Away" is three minutes and fifty-three seconds long. It was written by Cyrus, Finnish singer Alma, and American producers Mike Will Made It and Andrew Wyatt; Cyrus had most recently collaborated with Alma and Wyatt on the song "Mother's Daughter" and with Mike Will Made It on "Party Up the Street", both from her EP She Is Coming (2019). The track features a combination of "hip-hop drums, warm guitars, sweeping strings, and layered samples" over a "snappy" beat. Its arrangement has been compared to 1990s British music "when everyone started jet-setting around genres and playing with samples", including the songs "Tender" by Blur and "Bitter Sweet Symphony" by the Verve. It is acknowledged to contrast with the sound of Cyrus' three most recent albums Bangerz (2013), Miley Cyrus & Her Dead Petz (2015), and Younger Now (2017).

The lyrics are described as "much more introspective [and] somber" than the "funky" tracks released from She Is Coming. They are often compared to Cyrus' separation from husband Liam Hemsworth, which was announced on August 11, 2019. The line "move on, we're not seventeen / I'm not who I used to be" is believed to reference their first meeting while filming The Last Song (2010), and the line "so won't you slide away / back to the ocean, I'll go back to the city lights" supposedly addresses Cyrus' sighting in Los Angeles and Hemsworth's sighting surfing in Australia after their separation was announced. The lyrics "I want my house in the hills / don't want the whiskey and pills" have been attributed to "a big separation between 2019 Miley and the [2013] party girl persona."

== Critical reception ==
Bonnie Stiernberg from Billboard called the song "three-and-a-half minutes of emotional, self-reflection [that] appears to reflect the dramas in her own life". Brittany Vincent from MTV News commented that "it's hard to deny the heartbreak" in the perceived context of the lyrics, but spoke favorably of "[the] beauty in the acceptance". Craig Jenkins from Vulture wrote that the lyrics were "just about knowing when to cut your losses and move on" and avoided being "vindictive or tabloid-y", and that the production "suits Cyrus' voice, pushing her without overwhelming her." The publication included the song on its "Best Songs of 2019 (So Far)" list in September.

== Commercial performance ==
"Slide Away" debuted at number 47 on the US Billboard Hot 100 on the chart dated August 31, 2019. It is Cyrus' 48th entry on the chart.

== Music video ==
The accompanying music video for "Slide Away" was directed by Alexandre Moors, and released on September 6, 2019. It comprises scenes of Cyrus underwater in a pool, leaning on the edge of a pool, and amongst partygoers at a house party. Many scenes have been compared to the music video for her 2013 single "We Can't Stop"; Glenn Rowley from Billboard wrote that Cyrus appeared "fully detached from the revelry happening around her" compared to the previous video, and Christian Holub from Entertainment Weekly commented that she seemed "clearly unsatisfied."

== Live performances ==
Cyrus performed "Slide Away" at the 2019 MTV Video Music Awards in Newark, New Jersey on August 26. She previously stated that she would not perform at the award show in July, and her performance was announced on the day of the event. Cyrus performed in center stage through the entire song and was accompanied by a string section behind her. The performance was broadcast in black and white. Later Cyrus performed song on iHeartRadio Music Festival 2019 in Las Vegas. On September 1, 2020, Cyrus performed "Slide Away" on BBC Radio1 Live Lounge along with her 2020 hit Midnight Sky and cover of Billie Eilish's "My Future" and the Eagles' "Take It to the Limit".

== Credits and personnel ==
Credits adapted from Tidal.

- Miley Cyrus – vocals, songwriter
- Andrew Wyatt – producer, songwriter
- Mike Will Made It – producer, songwriter
- Alma Miettinen – songwriter
- Brandon Bost – assistant engineer
- Tom Elmhirst – mixing engineer
- Dave Kutch – mastering engineer
- Jacob Munk – engineer

== Charts ==
Chart performance for "Slide Away"
Chart (2019–2020)	Peak position
Australia (ARIA)	15
Austria (Ö3 Austria Top 40)	49
Belgium (Ultratip Bubbling Under Flanders)	1
Belgium (Ultratip Bubbling Under Wallonia)	29
Canada Hot 100 (Billboard)	28
Czech Republic Singles Digital (ČNS IFPI)	18
France (SNEP Sales Chart)	46
Germany (GfK)	67
Greece (IFPI)	21
Hungary (Single Top 40)	25
Hungary (Stream Top 40)	27
Ireland (IRMA)	25
Latvia (LAIPA)	16
Lithuania (AGATA)	14
New Zealand (Recorded Music NZ)	12
Norway (VG-lista)	28
Poland Airplay (ZPAV)	46
Portugal (AFP)	83
Scottish Singles Sales (Official Charts)	16
Slovakia Airplay (ČNS IFPI)	54
Slovakia Singles Digital (ČNS IFPI)	11
Sweden Heatseeker (Sverigetopplistan)	1
Switzerland (Schweizer Hitparade)	20
UK Singles (Official Charts)	40
US Billboard Hot 100	47
US Rolling Stone Top 100	18

== Certifications ==
Region	Certification	Certified units/sales
Australia (ARIA)	3× Platinum	210,000^{‡}
Brazil (Pro-Música Brasil)	2× Platinum	80,000^{‡}
Canada (Music Canada)	Gold	40,000^{‡}
Denmark (IFPI Danmark)	Gold	45,000^{‡}
Mexico (AMPROFON)	Gold	30,000^{‡}
New Zealand (RMNZ)	2× Platinum	60,000^{‡}
Norway (IFPI Norway)	Gold	30,000^{‡}
Poland (ZPAV)	Gold	25,000^{‡}
United Kingdom (BPI)	Gold	400,000^{‡}
^{‡} Sales+streaming figures based on certification alone.

== Release history ==
"Slide Away" release history
Region	Date	Format(s)	Label	Ref.
Various	August 16, 2019	Digital download; streaming	RCA	
Australia	August 16, 2019	Radio airplay	RCA	
Italy	September 13, 2019	Radio airplay	Sony	
