= Alexandre Moors =

French director, writer and editor (born 1972)

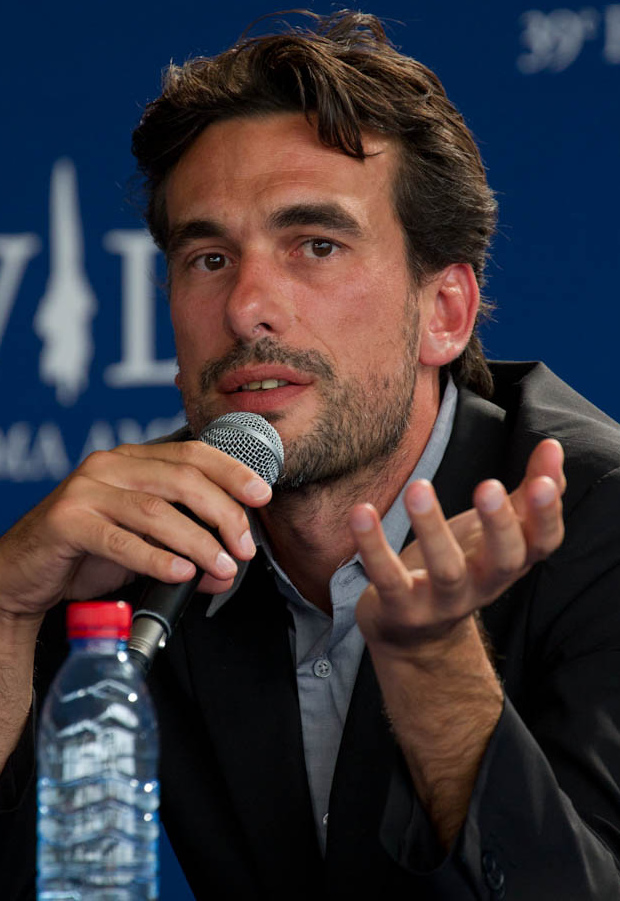
- Born: 1972 (age 53–54); Suresnes, France
- Occupations: Director; writer; editor
- Years active: 2000–present

Alexandre Moors (born 1972) is a French director, writer and editor.

== Early life ==
Alexandre Moors is a French filmmaker born in Suresnes in 1972. As a teenager, he was an active member of the Parisian "graffiti" scene before attending Penninghen School and then the Arts Decos’ (ENSAD). He left Paris for New York City in 1998 where he has since worked as graphic designer, director and artistic director.

== Career ==
He has directed several music video for singers like Miley Cyrus, Christina Aguilera, Chris Brown, Tyga, Big Sean, Kendrick Lamar, and Jennifer Lopez.

== Filmography ==
Short film

| Year | Title | Role |
|---|---|---|
| 2000 | How People Do | Director, writer & editor |
| 2001 | Shutter | Special effects |
| 2002 | The Lady Lovelace Deception System | Director, writer & special effects |
| 2006 | Cherry Bloom | Director, writer & editor |
| 2010 | Runaway | Creative consultant |
| 2012 | Cruel Summer | Co-director with Kanye West & writer |

TV series

| Year | Title | Role | Notes |
|---|---|---|---|
| 2009 | Clash of the Gods | Special effects | 10 episodes |

Music video

| Year | Title | Artist |
|---|---|---|
| 2009 | "Drown in the Now" | The Crystal Method & Matisyahu |
| 2010 | "All I Want Is You" | Miguel & J. Cole |
| 2010 | "Good Hit" | Jennifer Lopez |
| 2010 | "Midnight Hour" | Talib Kweli & Estelle |
| 2011 | "Quickie" | Miguel |
| 2012 | "Good Girls" | Cris Cab & Big Sean |
| 2013 | "Bad" | Wale & Tiara Thomas |
| 2014 | "Main Chick" | Kid Ink, Chris Brown & Tyga |
| 2014 | "i" | Kendrick Lamar |
| 2019 | "Mother's Daughter" | Miley Cyrus |
| 2019 | "Fast" | Juice WRLD |
| 2019 | "Slide Away" | Miley Cyrus |
| 2019 | "Icy" | Kim Petras |
| 2019 | "Dangerous" | Schoolboy Q & Kid Cudi |
| 2020 | "Wrong Direction" | Hailee Steinfeld |
| 2021 | "Pa' Mis Muchachas" | Christina Aguilera |
| 2023 | "Eras of Us" | Fletcher |

Feature film

| Year | Title | Role | Notes |
|---|---|---|---|
| 2013 | Blue Caprice | Director, writer, producer & editor | Black Reel Award - Outstanding Independent Feature; Nominated - Independent Spirit Award for Best First Feature; Nominated - Deauville American Film Festival - Grand Special Prize; Nominated - Gotham Award for Bingham Ray Breakthrough Director; Nominated - NAACP Image Award for Outstanding Independent Motion Picture; Nominated - Indiewire Critics' Poll - Best First Feature |
| 2017 | The Yellow Birds | Director | Nominated - Sundance Film Festival - Grand Jury Prize: Dramatic |

Advertisement

| Year | Title | Notes |
|---|---|---|
| 2015 | Beats by Dre | With Draymond Green |
| 2015 | Beats by Dre | With Dez Bryant |
| 2015 | Beats by Dre | With Tony Parker & Thierry Henry |

Documentary

| Year | Title | Role | Notes |
|---|---|---|---|
| 2026 | Booman I | Co-director with LaConnie Govan | For Casino by Baby Keem |
| 2026 | Booman II | Co-director with LaConnie Govan | For Casino by Baby Keem |
| 2026 | Booman III | Co-director with LaConnie Govan | For Casino by Baby Keem |
