= Boys Don't Cry (Anitta song) =

Single by Anitta

from the album Versions of Me
- Language: English
- Released: 27 January 2022
- Genre: Pop rock; electropop
- Length: 2:15
- Label: Warner
- Songwriters: Anitta; Bibi Bourelly; Burns; Rami Yacoub; Sean Douglas
- Producers: Burns; Rami Yacoub

Anitta singles chronology
"No Chão Novinha" (2021)	"Boys Don't Cry" (2022)	"Dançarina (Remix)" (2022)

Music video
- "Boys Don't Cry" on YouTube

"Boys Don't Cry" is a song by Brazilian singer Anitta, recorded for her fifth studio album Versions of Me (2022). The song was released for digital download and streaming as the fifth single from the album on January 27, 2022, by Warner Records. It was also included in the soundtrack of the telenovela Cara e Coragem.

A live version recorded by Anitta and American singer Miley Cyrus was released on April 29, 2022, and is included in Cyrus's third live album, Attention: Miley Live.

== Background and release ==
During the release of the single "Faking Love" in October 2021, Anitta confirmed that her next song would be her biggest single among her recent releases. "The big song, the one I truly believe in and have always mentioned in interviews in English, will be released in January. " On January 21, 2022, "Boys Don't Cry" was announced during an interview with Glamour, where the cover art and release date were revealed. The song was released for digital download and streaming through Warner Records as the fifth single from Versions of Me on January 27, 2022. It was sent to mainstream radio in the United States on February 8, 2022.

== Music video ==
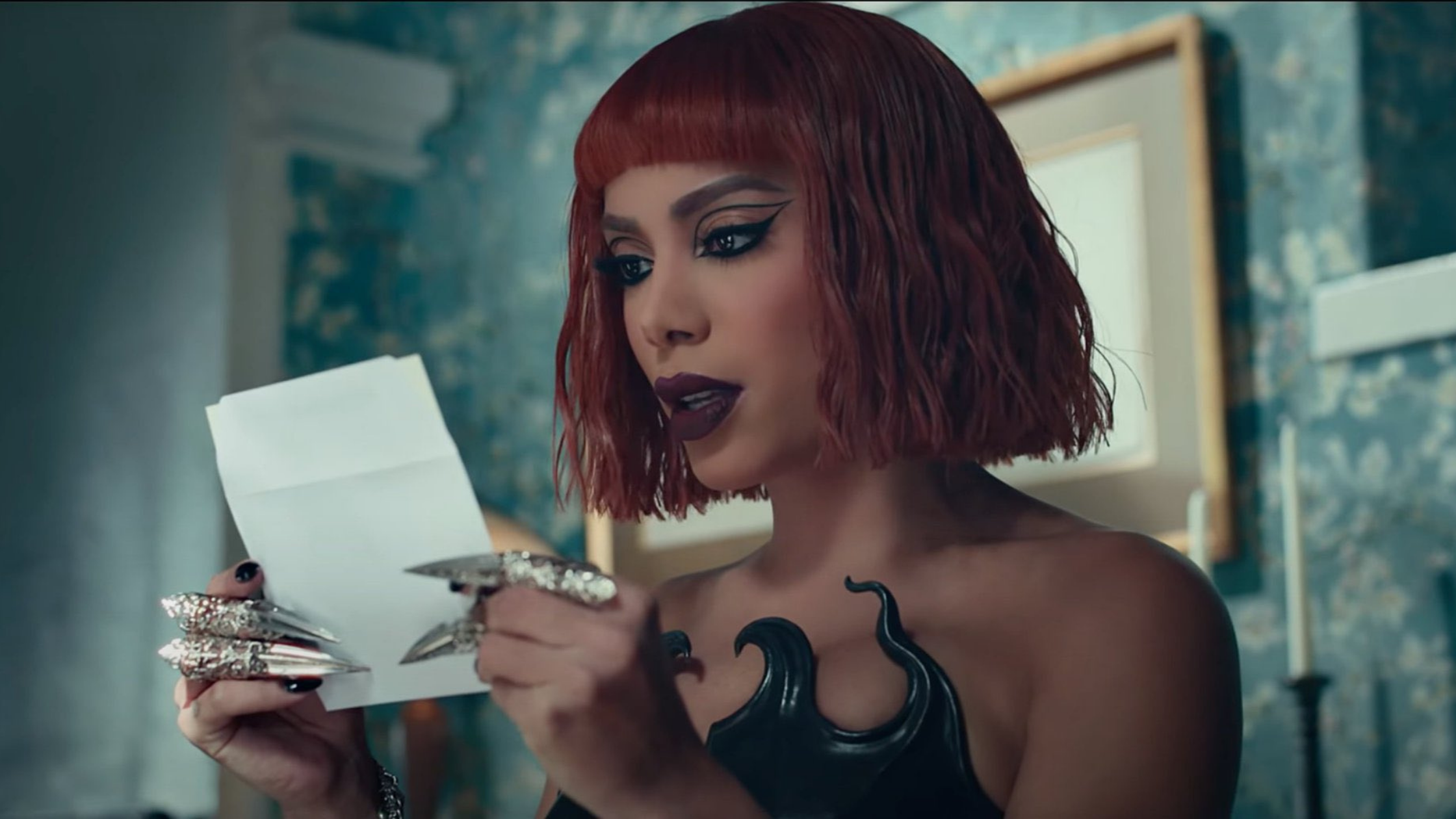
A scene in the music video for "Boys Don't Cry", which references many popular films.

Directed by Anitta herself and Christian Breslauer, the music video premiered in cinemas in São Paulo and Rio de Janeiro, with selected fans attending through a raffle organized by the singer's team. The production features various pop culture cinematic references, including Beetlejuice, Harry Potter, Runaway Bride, The Adventures of Priscilla, Queen of the Desert, Titanic, Resident Evil, Warm Bodies, The Fifth Element, and SLC Punk!.

== Live performances ==
Anitta performed "Boys Don't Cry" for the first time on The Tonight Show Starring Jimmy Fallon on January 31, 2022. On April 15, Anitta performed the song on Good Morning America. On March 26, Anitta was invited by Miley Cyrus to perform the song on stage at Lollapalooza 2022, where she delivered a live rendition of the track.

== Tracks ==
No.	Title	Length
1.	"Boys Don't Cry"	2:15
2.	"Boys Don't Cry [live] with Miley Cyrus"	2:34

== Awards ==
Year	Award ceremony	Category	Result	Ref.
2022	Multishow Brazilian Music Award	Clipe TVZ do Ano	Won	

== Charts ==
=== Weekly charts ===
Chart (2022)	Peak position
Brazil (Billboard)	17
Brazil (Top 100 Brasil)	33
Brazil (Top 10 Pop Internacional)	1
Global 200 (Billboard)	124
Panama (Monitor Latino Top 20 Anglo)	15
Paraguay (Monitor Latino Top 20 Anglo)	12
Portugal (AFP)	23
Uruguay (Monitor Latino Top 20 Anglo)	13
US Pop Airplay (Billboard)	33

== Release history ==
Region	Date	Format(s)	Version	Label	Ref.
Various	January 27, 2022	Download digital; streaming	Studio	Warner	
Italy	January 28, 2022	Mainstream radios	Studio	Warner	
United States	February 8, 2022	Mainstream radios	Studio	Warner	
Various	April 29, 2022	Digital download; streaming	Live	Columbia • Smiley Miley	
