= Angels like You =

2021 single by Miley Cyrus

"Angels Like You"

Single by Miley Cyrus

from the album Plastic Hearts
- Released: April 21, 2021
- Recorded: 2020
- Studio: Abbey Road Studios (London, England); Gold Tooth Music (Los Angeles, CA)
- Genre: Rock
- Length: 3:16
- Label: RCA
- Songwriters: Miley Cyrus; Ryan Tedder; Ali Tamposi; Andrew Watt; Louis Bell
- Producers: Louis Bell; Andrew Watt

Miley Cyrus singles chronology
"Prisoner" (2020)	"Angels Like You" (2021)	"Without You" (2021)

Music video
- "Angels like You" on YouTube

"Angels Like You" is a song by American singer Miley Cyrus, from her seventh studio album Plastic Hearts, released on November 27, 2020, through RCA Records. The song was written by Cyrus, Ali Tamposi, and Ryan Tedder with the song's producers Louis Bell and Andrew Watt. It was sent to radio as the third and final single from the album in Australia on March 12, 2021, it was also Cyrus' last single with RCA, whom she ended her contract with after 8 years. She subsequently signed with Columbia.

The song received positive reviews from critics. Commercially, the song reached number one in the Philippines and the top 10 in Indonesia and Malaysia. A music video for "Angels Like You" was released on March 8, 2021. It contains footage taken from Cyrus' Super Bowl pre-game performance on February 7, 2021.

== Background ==
"Angels like You" was originally released on November 27, 2020, alongside Cyrus' seventh studio album Plastic Hearts. A music video for the song was released on March 8, 2021. It impacted contemporary hit radio stations in Australia, as the third single from the album, four days later. British radio station BBC Radio 1 added "Angels like You" to rotation on March 20, and Sony Music sent it to contemporary hit radio stations in Italy on April 9, 2021.

== Composition ==
The lyrics of "Angels like You" were speculated to be about Kaitlynn Carter, who Cyrus previously dated.

== Music video ==
An official music video for "Angels like You" was released on March 8, 2021. The video was recorded on February 7, 2021, at Cyrus' performance at the Super Bowl LV pre-game show. At the end of the video, Cyrus endorsed the COVID-19 vaccine.

== In popular culture ==
Despite minimal support from Cyrus's former label, the track has remained popular since its release, initially gaining moderate traction on Spotify thanks to the singer's Attention Tour. Between January and July 2023, the song experienced a major resurgence, primarily on TikTok, which led it to spend many weeks in the top 20 on Global Spotify. As a result, 'Angels Like You' has become one of Cyrus's biggest streaming hits.

In November 2024, Cyrus appeared on an episode of Spotify's Billions Club: The Series, where she discussed the success of 'Angels Like You.' She shared, "Angels Like You is really all about the fans. It wasn't released as a single, it didn't have an official video. It was actually my first choice for the (lead) single from Plastic Hearts, but it wasn't selected at the time, and the fans made it happen."

It later charted for weeks and reached new peaks in official charts such as the Billboard Global 200 (peaking at #73) and Billboard Global Excluding US (peaking at #43), as well as some other major markets such as Billboard Canada and Asian countries such as the Philippines, where it went #1, making Miley Cyrus the first ever female artist to reach the #1 spot on the Philippines’ official chart multiple times (twice), later joined by Blackpink and Taylor Swift.

== Credits and personnel ==
Credits adapted from Tidal.

- Miley Cyrus – vocals, backing vocals, songwriting, executive production
- Andrew Watt – songwriting, production, executive production, backing vocals, bass, drums, guitar, keyboards
- Louis Bell – songwriting, production, keyboards, programming, engineering
- Ryan Tedder – songwriting
- Ali Tamposi – songwriting
- Will Malone – strings
- Paul Lamalfa – engineering
- Geoff Swan – engineering
- Michael Freeman – engineering
- Andrew Dudman – engineering
- Ryan Carline – engineering
- Mark "Spike" Stent – mixing
- Randy Merrill – mastering

== Charts ==
=== Weekly charts ===
2020–2021 weekly chart performance for "Angels like You"
Chart (2020–2021)	Peak position
Argentina Hot 100 (Billboard)	84
Australia (ARIA)	92
Belgium (Ultratip Bubbling Under Flanders)	1
Canada Hot 100 (Billboard)	55
Czech Republic Airplay (ČNS IFPI)	1
Global 200 (Billboard)	87
Iceland (Tónlistinn)	37
Ireland (IRMA)	43
Lithuania (AGATA)	69
Netherlands (Dutch Top 40)	21
Netherlands (Single Top 100)	51
Portugal (AFP)	71
San Marino (SMRRTV Top 50)	38
Slovakia (ČNS IFPI)	93
Sweden Heatseeker (Sverigetopplistan)	17
Switzerland (Schweizer Hitparade)	91
UK Singles (OCC)	66
US Bubbling Under Hot 100 (Billboard)	7

2023 weekly chart performance for "Angels like You"
Chart (2023)	Peak position
Global 200 (Billboard)	73
Indonesia (Billboard)	4
Malaysia (Billboard)	4
Malaysia International (RIM)	2
Philippines (Billboard)	1
Singapore (RIAS)	12

2025 weekly chart performance for "Angels like You"
Chart (2025)	Peak position
Venezuela Airplay (Record Report)	113

=== Year-end charts ===
2021 Year-end chart performance for "Angels like You"
Chart (2021)	Position
Netherlands (Dutch Top 40)	99

2023 Year-end chart performance for "Angels like You"
Chart (2023)	Position
Billboard Global Excl. U.S. (Billboard)	166

== Certifications ==
Certifications for "Angels like You"
Region	Certification	Certified units/sales
Australia (ARIA)	Gold	35,000^{‡}
Brazil (Pro-Música Brasil)	2× Diamond	320,000^{‡}
Denmark (IFPI Danmark)	Gold	45,000^{‡}
France (SNEP)	Gold	100,000^{‡}
Mexico (AMPROFON)	Diamond+Gold	770,000^{‡}
New Zealand (RMNZ)	Platinum	30,000^{‡}
Poland (ZPAV)	Gold	25,000^{‡}
Spain (Promusicae)	Platinum	60,000^{‡}
United Kingdom (BPI)	Gold	400,000^{‡}
United States (RIAA)	Platinum	1,000,000^{‡}
^{‡} Sales+streaming figures based on certification alone.

== Release history ==
Release dates and format(s) for "Angels like You"
Region	Date	Format	Label	Ref.
Australia	March 12, 2021	Radio airplay	Sony	
Italy	April 9, 2021	Radio airplay	Sony	
