= Midnight Sky =

2020 single by Miley Cyrus

Single by Miley Cyrus

from the album Plastic Hearts
- Released: August 14, 2020
- Studio: Gold Tooth Music (Los Angeles, CA)
- Genre: Disco; pop; synth-pop; electropop; pop rock
- Length: 3:43
- Label: RCA
- Songwriters: Miley Cyrus; Ilsey Juber; Jon Bellion; Alexandra Tamposi; Andrew Wotman; Louis Bell
- Producers: Louis Bell; Andrew Watt

Miley Cyrus singles chronology
"Don't Call Me Angel" (2019)	"Midnight Sky" (2020)	"Prisoner" (2020)

Music video
- "Midnight Sky" on YouTube

"Midnight Sky" is a song by American singer Miley Cyrus, released on August 14, 2020, by RCA Records as the lead single from her seventh studio album Plastic Hearts. The single was written by Cyrus, Ali Tamposi, Ilsey Juber and Jon Bellion with song's producers: Louis Bell and Andrew Watt. It is a disco, pop, synth-pop, electropop and pop rock song with lyrics about independence and self-confidence. The song's music video was Cyrus' first self-directed music video and was released on the same day as the single.

"Midnight Sky" was included on several year-end lists of best songs of 2020. Commercially, the song reached number one in Bulgaria, Lebanon, and Serbia, as well as the top five in the United Kingdom and has reached the top ten on music charts in over 15 territories. It also peaked at number 15 on the Billboard Global 200 chart. It was also the longest-running number-one single on UK radio in 2020, spending six weeks on top.

== Background and release ==
On August 4, 2020, Cyrus posted on her social media a clip of the music video for her song "Start All Over" with the hashtags "#sheiscoming" and "#butforrealthistime", in reference to her long-delayed seventh studio album She Is Miley Cyrus. Later that day, she shared a preview of "Midnight Sky" on social media. The track was released on August 14 as planned.

A preview of "Midnight Sky" was released to coincide with the launch of Instagram Reels, a video-sharing service similar to TikTok, on August 6, 2020. On August 31, the Midnight Sky Truck, an experiential pop-up, appeared in Los Angeles, with various influencers sharing photographs and videos of themselves in the truck.

The song and video were inspired by other female musicians, such as Stevie Nicks, Joan Jett and Debbie Harry, specifically, Nicks' song "Edge of Seventeen". Cyrus reached out to Nicks before release, asking for her blessing of the song. In an interview with Hits 1, Cyrus explained the song's background, stating:

You just definitely want to feel like you are just in control of your own life and not trying to control anyone else's, so for me to be able to really have a good, clear understanding of the last two years, which there was some traumatic experiences – losing the house in Malibu and going through a really public breakup – I think I just really needed some clarity. And so it was just really important to me to be able to like really sit with my thoughts.

Just hours before it was released, reports surfaced that the singer and Cody Simpson had split. Although unconfirmed, the reported breakup came as the singer explained to SiriusXM Hits 1 that much of the song focuses on the idea of personal evolution.

== Composition and lyrics ==
"Midnight Sky" is a disco and pop song with "raw arena rock vocals and the pristinely glossy production", as described by Rolling Stone. It has also been characterized as "Prince-esque", synth-pop, electropop and pop rock. Written in the key of E minor, it has a tempo of 110 beats per minute, with Cyrus' vocal range spanning from the low note of D_{3} to the high note of D_{5}.

Its lyrics are inspired by Cyrus' divorce from Liam Hemsworth and relationships with Kaitlynn Carter and Cody Simpson, and show the singer "tak[ing] back her narrative" and being confident in herself. She also revealed in an interview in Alex Cooper's Call Her Daddy podcast that her desire was for the song to be an anthem that normalized pansexuality and provided visibility for those living in fear of rejection over their authentic selves. Cyrus described the song as a "reflection of everyone kind of having this personal kind of woke moment" during an interview on the Zach Sang Show, where she declared:

I feel like a lot of us are waking up. And you know, the midnight sky, I think is kind of a road that feels like it could be nice to take with our head up in the clouds. You know, I feel like right now in society, we don't want to live with our heads in the clouds. But I think in time that's maybe why I've created worlds like this. Because this is kind of my idea of living with my head in the clouds of my own kind of fantasy and the world I wanna create. So I think that it's a cool message, to tell people to create the environment and the world that you wanna live in and I think that's happening on a very political level right now. But also we can do it especially in this quarantine time, in these intimate spaces of our home that we have a place that feels like we've created our own environment, our own head in the clouds, so this is mine.

Singing about the idea of forever being no more in the track, Cyrus explained that she wanted to capture the idea of personal growth. "I think we're kind of set up for devastation — in that, from the time we're little kids, we're taught to claim other humans as our best friends forever. And you just don't know who you're going to be sitting with here right now. You never know who you're going to evolve to be and who they're going to evolve to be," she said to SiriusXM Hits1.

Cyrus opens the song with the declaration that "it's been a long time since I felt this good on my own" and she later sings "I don't need to be loved by you." The moment is a personal one, exploring independence in the wake of her divorce from Liam Hemsworth. As she told Zane Lowe in an Apple Music interview, some of "Midnight Sky" stemmed from a personal desire to be the one to tell her story, since looking back, she explained that it often felt as if the press were the ones to tell her story. With the release of the song, Cyrus wanted to speak directly to her fans, and to have more control over an identity that's been shaped by a lifetime in the public eye.

== Critical reception ==
"Midnight Sky" was highly praised by music critics. Brittany Spanos of Rolling Stone believed "the 27-year-old Disney darling-turned-pop provocateur has returned with yet another bold reinvention, looking to the raw arena rock vocals and the pristinely glossy production of the era for her new single". She also wrote that Cyrus channeled Stevie Nicks at her solo 80s peak, calling the track a "Stand Back" 2.0, and added that it is "a Prince-esque come hither full of biting, bewitching heartbreak confidence that Nicks invented". Nina Corcoran of Consequence of Sound described it as a "flashy synthpop number" stating that is "arguably sleeker than anything Cyrus has released before".

Alex Gallagher of NME described "Midnight Sky" as an "assertive disco-tinged bop". Gallagher praised the song's lyrics for "Cyrus asserting [her] control and independence," adding that the song's chorus was "rousing." Similarly, Michael Cragg of The Guardian called the song a "disco-tinged, post-divorce banger", commenting that it "sounds suitably refreshed after the double-meh of 2017's country singer rebirth and last year's, erm, 'Cattitude', 'Midnight Sky' is everything all that wasn't: impassioned, energised and delivered by someone brave enough to sport a platinum-blonde mullet". Mike Wass of Idolator described it as a "dreamy disco anthem"; he praised the personal lyrics stating that "the first taste of MC7 is a deeply autobiographical account of the pop star's emotional journey post-divorce".

The New York Times' pop critics ranked "Midnight Sky" as one of the week's most notable releases in their weekly updated column "The Playlist", where Lindsay Zoladz highlighted that "Cyrus's punchy, muscular alto is the true center of this song's power". Entertainment Weekly's music team also ranked the track as one of the best songs of the week in their weekly column "Friday Five" and Marcus Jones commented: "the single lets her still be the rock star she's branded herself over the last five years while catering to those who first embraced her during the Hannah Montana era". Claire Dodson of Teen Vogue included "Midnight Sky" in the magazine's selection of the week's best new tunes, stating that "Cyrus' musical journey continues to twist and turn, but her rebellious sensibilities (and recent '80s Joan Jett-esque haircut) are perfectly at home on 'Midnight Sky' an electro-dance track about not belonging to anyone".

=== Year-end lists ===
Select rankings of "Midnight Sky"
Publication	List	Rank	Ref.
Billboard	The Best Songs of 2020	16	
Billboard	The 30 Best Pop Songs of 2020: Staff Picks	—N/a	
Consequence of Sound	Top 50 Songs of 2020	17	
DIY	DIY's Best Songs of 2020	9	
Idolator	The 100 Best Pop Songs of 2020	10	
NME	The 50 Best Songs of 2020	21	
PopBuzz	The 20 Best Singles of 2020	5	
Rolling Stone	Best Songs of 2020	11	
Spin	The 30 Best Songs of 2020	18	
Pitchfork	Pitchfork Reader's Top 100 Songs of 2020	37	

== Commercial performance ==
In the United States, "Midnight Sky" debuted at number 14 on the Billboard Hot 100, becoming Cyrus' 15th top-20 hit in the country and 50th entry on the chart, making her one of the artists with most Hot 100 entries. The song also became her best solo debut on the chart since "Malibu", which peaked at number ten in 2017, although in the meantime Cyrus had also reached number 13 with "Don't Call Me Angel", along with Ariana Grande and Lana Del Rey. In its first week "Midnight Sky" was the 20th most heard song in the United States in streaming and the third most downloaded legally. The single debuted at number three on Billboard Hot Digital Songs chart after only Cardi B & Megan Thee Stallion's "WAP" and Morgan Wallen's "7 Summers", another release of the week. The single was certified two-times platinum by the Recording Industry Association of America (RIAA) in April 2023.

In the United Kingdom, the song debuted at number 15 on the UK Singles Chart for the issue dated August 21, 2020 and reached number seven in its seventh week there, becoming Cyrus' sixth top-ten hit in the country. In its tenth week, it reached a new peak of number five. The song is also the longest-running number-one single on UK radio in 2020, with six weeks so far, and on iTunes, with 29 days atop the chart. Thus, "Midnight Sky" became United Kingdom's biggest song by a female artist of 2020 and second overall, according to The Official Big Top 40 making it Cyrus' second year on a roll having the biggest female song of the year in the country, following "Nothing Breaks Like a Heart" in 2019. The song was also the 11th best-selling single in pure sales of 2020 on the UK Singles Chart. On June 20, 2022, PPL reported that "Midnight Sky" was United Kingdom's 9th most played track in 2021 and also the only solo song by a female artist in the top 10.

"Midnight Sky" also debuted at number 16 in Australia, later peaking at number seven, number eight in Canada and number one in Scotland.

== Remix ==
"Edge of Midnight (Midnight Sky Remix)"

Single by Miley Cyrus featuring Stevie Nicks

from the album Plastic Hearts
- Released: November 6, 2020
- Studio: Gold Tooth Music (Los Angeles, CA)
- Length: 3:43
- Label: RCA
- Songwriters: Miley Cyrus; Ilsey Juber; Jon Bellion; Alexandra Tamposi; Andrew Wotman; Louis Bell; Stevie Nicks
- Producers: Louis Bell; Andrew Watt

On November 6, 2020, Cyrus released a remix of "Midnight Sky" featuring Stevie Nicks, titled "Edge of Midnight". The song is a mashup of "Midnight Sky" and Stevie Nicks's own 1982 single "Edge of Seventeen". Nicks lends her own vocals in this version, singing the chorus of "Midnight Sky", while Cyrus does the same singing "just like the white winged dove" from Nicks's "Edge of Seventeen". The remix has a unique cover featuring both Nicks and Cyrus.

== Music video ==
An accompanying, self-directed music video for "Midnight Sky" was released on August 14, 2020. It features Cyrus in various settings, such as a room with mirrors, a "colorful" gumball pit and a neon disco setting with streamers and Technicolor statues of jungle animals, while wearing a mullet, glittery makeup, black Chanel bodysuit, Swarovski gem-covered black gloves. In a mini-doc about the making of the video, Cyrus is detailed in her references, calling upon Pat Benatar and David Bowie as visual inspirations. She's even more specific and studied when she talks about the acid-trip theme of the video: "You went to a Blondie show at CBGB with a hit of acid for later [in tow], head to an afterparty at Indochine, and pop the tab when you know you'll be at Studio 54," she says.

According to Lauren Valenti of Vogue, the music video shows Cyrus ushering in a new aesthetic era that harks back to the glamour and rebellion of the late 1970s. "It's a dizzying display of self-expression all Cyrus's own, though she did work off the right blueprints, drawing inspiration for her sparkling short from her female rock icons Joan Jett, Debbie Harry, and Stevie Nicks" pointed Valenti.

In an interview with Apple Music, Cyrus explained she was in fact creating the music video for another song when the "Midnight Sky" song idea came out to her, along the music video concept:

[F]or this record, actually, the way that I even wrote "Midnight Sky" was I was prepping to create a video for another song. I wrote and directed and conceptualized the video for "Midnight Sky," but it started because I was doing that with another song. Then Andrew Watt, my creative partner, came over and played me this track, and I scratched everything and said, "I've got to write this. This is the foundation of which I feel like I can lay my story on top of that."

In a radio interview with Chris Kelly for Toronto's KiSS 92.5, Cyrus said the bubble gum in the video represents "[her] being lost in the bubblegum pop scene" and the disco ball reflected that "it's this kind of broken pieces that were put back together to make something whole again".

== Live performances ==
Cyrus performed "Midnight Sky" for the first time at the 2020 MTV Video Music Awards on August 30, where she swung on a disco ball, in reference to her 2013 song, "Wrecking Ball". The next day, she performed the song on Live Lounge. On September 10, she performed the song at The Tonight Show Starring Jimmy Fallon. Ten days later she performed the song on iHeartRadio Music Festival 2020. On October 9, she performed "Midnight Sky" on The Graham Norton Show amongst "a million Mileys". On October 16, Cyrus performed the song on her MTV Unplugged: Backyard Sessions special. She performed the song at Save Our Stages, the event was held on October 20, 2020. She performed again in Amazon Music Holiday Plays digital concert series on December 1. Later she performed the remix version of Midnight Sky, "Edge of Midnight" for the first time on The Howard Stern Show. Cyrus again performed the "Edge of Midnight" along with "Party in the U.S.A." and "Prisoner" on Dick Clark's New Year's Rockin' Eve with Ryan Seacrest in Times Square on December 31. Cyrus also performed "Edge of Midnight" along with several songs of Plastic Hearts at the 2021 Super Bowl with TikTok Tailgate. On December 31, 2022, Cyrus performed the song with FLETCHER as a duet on the TV program Miley's New Year's Eve Party.

== Awards and nominations ==
Year	Organization	Award	Result	Ref.
2020	MTV Video Music Awards	Song of Summer	Nominated	
2021	MTV Millennial Awards Brazil	Hit Global	Nominated	

== Charts ==
=== Weekly charts ===
Weekly chart performance
Chart (2020–2021)	Peak position
Argentina Hot 100 (Billboard)	40
Australia (ARIA)	7
Austria (Ö3 Austria Top 40)	33
Belgium (Ultratop 50 Flanders)	6
Belgium (Ultratop 50 Wallonia)	6
Bulgaria (PROPHON)	1
Canada Hot 100 (Billboard)	8
Canada AC (Billboard)	21
Canada CHR/Top 40 (Billboard)	10
Canada Hot AC (Billboard)	9
CIS Airplay (TopHit)	56
Colombia Anglo (Monitor Latino)	17
Croatia (HRT)	2
Czech Republic Airplay (ČNS IFPI)	3
Czech Republic Singles Digital (ČNS IFPI)	19
Denmark (Tracklisten)	24
El Salvador (Monitor Latino)	12
Estonia (Eesti Tipp-40)	27
Euro Digital Song Sales (Billboard)	2
Finland Airplay (Radiosoittolista)	2
France (SNEP)	123
Germany (GfK)	27
Germany Airplay (BVMI)	1
Global 200 (Billboard)	15
Greece (IFPI)	17
Hungary (Rádiós Top 40)	1
Hungary (Single Top 40)	2
Hungary (Stream Top 40)	14
Iceland (Tónlistinn)	5
Ireland (IRMA)	4
Israel (Media Forest)	3
Italy (FIMI)	72
Lebanon (Lebanese Top 20)	1
Lithuania (AGATA)	14
Netherlands (Dutch Top 40)	7
Netherlands (Single Top 100)	23
New Zealand (Recorded Music NZ)	27
Norway (VG-lista)	25
Panama (PRODUCE)	24
Poland Airplay (ZPAV)	8
Portugal (AFP)	44
Romania (Airplay 100)	58
Russia Airplay (TopHit)	92
San Marino (SMRRTV Top 50)	12
Scottish Singles Sales (Official Charts)	1
Slovakia Airplay (ČNS IFPI)	6
Slovakia Singles Digital (ČNS IFPI)	26
Slovenia (SloTop50)	7
Spain (Promusicae)	52
Sweden (Sverigetopplistan)	31
Switzerland (Schweizer Hitparade)	20
UK Singles (Official Charts)	5
US Billboard Hot 100	14
US Adult Contemporary (Billboard)	20
US Adult Pop Airplay (Billboard)	11
US Dance Airplay (Billboard)	26
US Pop Airplay (Billboard)	17
US Rolling Stone Top 100	8
Wales (OCC)	2

=== Year-end charts ===
2020 year-end chart performance
Chart (2020)	Position
Australia (ARIA)	92
Belgium (Ultratop Flanders)	69
Canada (Canadian Hot 100)	94
Germany (Official German Charts)	100
Hungary (Rádiós Top 40)	54
Hungary (Single Top 40)	26
Hungary (Stream Top 40)	40
Netherlands (Dutch Top 40)	32
Netherlands (Single Top 100)	98
Poland (Polish Airplay Top 100)	83
Switzerland (Schweizer Hitparade)	75
UK Singles (OCC)	69
US Adult Top 40 (Billboard)	46

2021 year-end chart performance
Chart (2021)	Position
Australia (ARIA)	94
Belgium (Ultratop Flanders)	94
Canada (Canadian Hot 100)	81
Global 200 (Billboard)	108
Hungary (Rádiós Top 40)	19
Hungary (Single Top 40)	75
UK Singles (OCC)	70

2022 year-end chart performance
Chart (2022)	Position
Hungary (Rádiós Top 40)	83

== Certifications ==
Certifications for "Midnight Sky"
Region	Certification	Certified units/sales
Australia (ARIA)	3× Platinum	210,000^{‡}
Austria (IFPI Austria)	Platinum	30,000^{‡}
Belgium (BRMA)	Gold	20,000^{‡}
Brazil (Pro-Música Brasil)	Diamond	160,000^{‡}
Brazil (Pro-Música Brasil) Edge of Midnight (Midnight Sky Remix)	Gold	20,000^{‡}
Denmark (IFPI Danmark)	Platinum	90,000^{‡}
France (SNEP)	Gold	100,000^{‡}
Germany (BVMI)	Gold	200,000^{‡}
Italy (FIMI)	Gold	35,000^{‡}
Mexico (AMPROFON)	Gold	30,000^{‡}
New Zealand (RMNZ)	2× Platinum	60,000^{‡}
New Zealand (RMNZ) Edge of Midnight (Midnight Sky Remix)	Gold	15,000^{‡}
Norway (IFPI Norway)	Platinum	60,000^{‡}
Poland (ZPAV)	2× Platinum	40,000^{‡}
Portugal (AFP)	Gold	5,000^{‡}
Spain (Promusicae)	Platinum	60,000^{‡}
United Kingdom (BPI)	2× Platinum	1,200,000^{‡}
United States (RIAA)	2× Platinum	2,000,000^{‡}
Streaming
Sweden (GLF)	Platinum	8,000,000^{†}
^{‡} Sales+streaming figures based on certification alone.^{†} Streaming-only figures based on certification alone.

== Release history ==
Release dates and formats for "Midnight Sky"
Region	Date	Format(s)	Version	Label	Ref.
Various	August 14, 2020	Digital download; streaming	Original	RCA	
United States	August 17, 2020	Adult contemporary radio; hot adult contemporary radio; modern adult contemporary radio	Original	RCA	
United States	August 18, 2020	Contemporary hit radio	Original	RCA	
Italy	August 28, 2020	Radio airplay	Original	Sony	
Various	November 6, 2020	Digital download; streaming	"Edge of Midnight"	RCA	
Italy	November 9, 2020	Radio airplay	"Edge of Midnight"	Sony	
