= Mother's Daughter (song) =

2019 single by Miley Cyrus

Single by Miley Cyrus

from the EP She Is Coming
- Released: May 31, 2019
- Genre: Pop; trap rock; trip hop
- Length: 3:39
- Label: RCA
- Songwriters: Miley Cyrus; Andrew Wyatt; Alma Miettinen
- Producer: Andrew Wyatt

Miley Cyrus singles chronology
"Nothing Breaks Like a Heart" (2018)	"Mother's Daughter" (2019)	"Slide Away" (2019)

Music video
- "Mother's Daughter" on YouTube

"Mother's Daughter" is a song by American singer Miley Cyrus. It was released consecutively as the lead single with Cyrus' second EP She Is Coming, on May 31, 2019 by RCA Records. It was written by Cyrus, Alma Miettinen, and its producer Andrew Wyatt. The Wuki remix debuted in August, and received a nomination for Best Remixed Recording at the 62nd Annual Grammy Awards. Its music video won two MTV Video Music Awards in 2020.

== Composition ==
"Mother's Daughter" is 3 minutes and 39 seconds long. A pop, trap rock and trip hop song, it was written by Cyrus, Alma Miettinen and its producer Andrew Wyatt. Lyrically, the song was described as a women's empowerment anthem. It focuses on the mother-daughter duo's strong relationship, and references how the singer's mother, Tish Cyrus, told her she'd "make it", singing: "I put my back into it, my heart in it/So I did it, yeah I did it.". Additionally, Cyrus describes herself as "nasty and evil", and explains that she has the freedom to do as she wishes: "Don't fuck with my freedom/I came up to get me some/I'm nasty, I'm evil/Must be something in the water or that I'm my mother's daughter", she sings in the chorus.

== Commercial performance ==
Following the release of She Is Coming, "Mother's Daughter" debuted at number 54 on the US Billboard Hot 100. It is Cyrus' 47th entry on the chart, and her highest debut since "Adore You" entered at number 42 following the release of Bangerz in 2013.

== Music video ==
The official music video was released on July 2, 2019. Alexandre Moors—who has helmed videos for Kendrick Lamar, Jennifer Lopez, ScHoolboy Q and Miguel, as well as the Jennifer Aniston-Alden Ehrenreich war drama The Yellow Birds—directed it. He and Cyrus finalized the concept as the anti-abortion "heartbeat bill" gained traction across the country.

The video is about the woman’s body—the right to own your own body and make it free from the male gaze, in any way shape and form, [...] It’s a broad message, and we’re not trying to be dogmatic. But we’re living in difficult times in America, and what I get from this video is that it injects a lot of energy and determination and the right fuel for the struggle.

— director Alexandre Moors talking about the music video to Los Angeles Times

It features Cyrus wearing a red latex catsuit against red lighting and aesthetics, and features shots of diverse women and nonbinary people, including plus-size women, women of color, disabled women, transgender women, and a nonbinary person using they/them pronouns, sitting and posing in different places. Cyrus' real-life mother Tish Cyrus makes a cameo appearance in the video. The video also shows nude scenes and has feminist signs flashing on-screen at random intervals. It is also sprinkled with images of breastfeeding, C-sections, menstrual pads—everything about the female body that's supposed to carry some taboo. The video is presented in 4:3 aspect ratio format.

Cyrus' red latex catsuit, calls back to the memorable outfits worn in Britney Spears' "Oops!...I Did It Again" and Lady Gaga's "Bad Romance" videos. Her version, however, has a bejeweled vagina dentata, as a notable embellishment. She also appears wearing a gold armor while atop a horse, holding a sword à la Joan of Arc. That latex look, otherwise, was not meant to be an explicit callback to the aforementioned musicians, but rather, "it was interesting to subvert some of the codes of the sexual attire, and actually transform beyond it into more of an armor or a fight suit" Moors said, "They look more like warriors than anything with sexual implications."

In coordination with the video drop, Cyrus shared 18 posts on her Instagram account that featured statements from those who make cameos.

The Insider placed the music video second on their list of the best music videos of 2019, commenting that "aside from the genius styling and gorgeous direction, the real triumph of Cyrus' video is how it highlights a wide variety of people who might connect with the song's message of empowerment and freedom".

== Live performances ==
Cyrus first performed "Mother's Daughter" at BBC Radio 1's Big Weekend in Middlesbrough on May 25, 2019. It was also performed at Primavera Sound in Barcelona on May 31, Orange Warsaw Festival in Warsaw on June 1, Tinderbox in Odense on June 28, and at Glastonbury Festival in Pilton on June 30. Later Cyrus performed song on iHeartRadio Music Festival 2019 in Las Vegas.

== Legacy ==
On October 22, 2020, the Constitutional Tribunal of Poland ruled that an abortion in cases of "disability or incurable illness" of fetus is unconstitutional (in practice, the provision that was ruled unconstitutional represented the majority of more than 90% abortions legally done in Poland each year). Due to this, "Mother's Daughter" went viral in Poland, becoming one of the most listened to songs at the time. Thousands of women took the streets to demand decriminalization of abortion with phrases inspired by the verses of the song such as "Don't mess with my freedom" written on posters. The phenomenon had several pictures circulating the internet, as well as videos of the protesters singing the song, and was also shared and endorsed by Cyrus on her social media.

== Track listing ==
- Digital single
1. "Mother's Daughter" (White Panda Remix) – 2:55
2. "Mother's Daughter" (R3HAB Remix) – 2:32
3. "Mother's Daughter" (Wuki Remix) – 3:08

== Credits and personnel ==
Credits adapted from Tidal.

- Miley Cyrus – vocals, songwriter
- Alma – songwriter
- Andrew Wyatt – producer, songwriter
- Jacob Munk – recording engineer
- John Hanes – recording engineer
- Tay Keith – programmer
- Şerban Ghenea – mixing engineer

== Awards and nominations ==
Year	Organization	Award	Result
2019	MTV Video Music Awards	Song of Summer	Nominated
2020	Grammy Awards	Best Remixed Recording	Nominated
2020	MTV Video Music Awards	Best Art Direction	Won
2020	MTV Video Music Awards	Best Editing	Won

== Charts ==
=== Weekly charts ===
Weekly chart performance
Chart (2019)	Peak position
Australia (ARIA)	21
Austria (Ö3 Austria Top 40)	49
Belgium (Ultratip Bubbling Under Flanders)	9
Belgium (Ultratip Bubbling Under Wallonia)	38
Bulgaria (PROPHON)	3
Canada Hot 100 (Billboard)	31
China Airplay/FL (Billboard)	4
Czech Republic Airplay (ČNS IFPI)	19
Czech Republic Singles Digital (ČNS IFPI)	10
Finland Airplay (Radiosoittolista)	7
France (SNEP)	177
Germany (GfK)	75
Hungary (Single Top 40)	10
Hungary (Stream Top 40)	8
Ireland (IRMA)	22
Italy (FIMI)	86
Latvia (LAIPA)	5
Lithuania (AGATA)	14
Netherlands (Single Top 100)	100
New Zealand (Recorded Music NZ)	21
Poland Airplay (ZPAV)	20
Romania (Airplay 100)	55
Scottish Singles Sales (Official Charts)	14
Slovakia Singles Digital (ČNS IFPI)	10
Spain (Promusicae)	81
Sweden (Sverigetopplistan)	76
Switzerland (Schweizer Hitparade)	48
UK Singles (Official Charts)	29
US Billboard Hot 100	54
US Adult Pop Airplay (Billboard)	40
US Pop Airplay (Billboard)	27
US Rolling Stone Top 100	88

=== Year-end charts ===
Year-end chart performance
Chart (2019)	Position
Latvia (LAIPA)	65

== Certifications ==
Certifications and sales
Region	Certification	Certified units/sales
Australia (ARIA)	2× Platinum	140,000^{‡}
Brazil (Pro-Música Brasil)	3× Platinum	120,000^{‡}
Canada (Music Canada)	Platinum	80,000^{‡}
Denmark (IFPI Danmark)	Gold	45,000^{‡}
New Zealand (RMNZ)	Platinum	30,000^{‡}
Poland (ZPAV)	3× Platinum	60,000^{‡}
United Kingdom (BPI)	Gold	400,000^{‡}
^{‡} Sales+streaming figures based on certification alone.

== Release history ==
Release dates and formats
Region	Date	Format(s)	Version	Label(s)	Ref.
Australia	May 31, 2019	Radio airplay	Original	RCA; Sony	
Italy	June 7, 2019	Radio airplay	Original	Sony	
United States	June 11, 2019	Contemporary hit radio	Original	RCA	
Various	August 2, 2019	Digital download; streaming	R3hab remix	RCA	
Various	August 2, 2019	Digital download; streaming	Wuki remix	RCA	
Various	August 9, 2019	Digital download; streaming	White Panda remix	RCA	
