= She Is Coming =

2019 EP by Miley Cyrus

EP by Miley Cyrus
- Released: May 31, 2019
- Recorded: 2018–2019
- Genres: Pop; electronic; rock
- Length: 19:05
- Label: RCA
- Producers: John Cunningham; King Henry; Mike Will Made It; Pluss; Mark Ronson; RZA; Jasper Sheff; Andrew Wyatt

Miley Cyrus chronology
Younger Now (2017)	She Is Coming (2019)	Plastic Hearts (2020)

Singles from She Is Coming
- 1. "Mother's Daughter" Released: May 31, 2019

She Is Coming (stylized in all caps) is the third extended play (EP) by American singer Miley Cyrus. It was released on May 31, 2019, by RCA Records. She Is Coming was intended to be the first of three EPs that would comprise Cyrus' seventh studio album She Is Miley Cyrus, but the other two EPs were never released. Her completed seventh studio album Plastic Hearts (2020) includes some songs from these recording sessions.

She Is Coming is described as a pop, electronic and rock record with hip hop, R&B and trap influences. Andrew Wyatt and John Cunningham produced most of the EP. She also collaborated with producers Mike Will Made It, Mark Ronson. Featured artists include Ghostface Killah, RuPaul, and Swae Lee. The EP received positive reviews from music critics. It debuted at number five on the US Billboard 200. The lead single "Mother's Daughter" was released on May 31. On August 16, 2019, Cyrus released the single "Slide Away", which was added on a reissue of the EP on May 31, 2023. To promote the EP, Cyrus performed at several European music festivals during spring and summer 2019.

== Background ==
Cyrus collaborated with producers including Mike Will Made It, Mark Ronson, and Andrew Wyatt for her then-untitled seventh studio album, which was completed between fall 2017 and May 2019. The first track from these recording sessions, the Ronson-produced "Nothing Breaks Like a Heart" for his own album Late Night Feelings (2019), was released on November 29, 2018; it peaked at number two on the UK Singles Chart and number 43 on the US Billboard Hot 100. Cyrus described the sound of the song to be a "nice introduction" to and "heavier" than her own record.

Cyrus first used the phrase "She Is Coming" on social media in anticipation of the Met Gala on May 6, 2019. On May 9, she used the phrase to announce that new music would be released on May 30. On May 27, it was announced that She Is Coming would be released as a multi-track extended play, instead of a lead single on its own, on May 31. Consequently, it is Cyrus' first EP since The Time of Our Lives (2009). The cover artwork, photographed by Gray Sorrenti, was revealed that day; the black-and-white picture sees Cyrus standing over the camera dressed in a crop top reading "never mind the bollocks", making reference to Never Mind the Bollocks, Here's the Sex Pistols (1977) by the Sex Pistols.

Upon its release, Cyrus revealed that She Is Coming was the first of three EPs that tell "different [chapters] to a trilogy" that would together form the full-length record that was confirmed to be titled She Is Miley Cyrus. However, the project was ultimately scrapped, and Cyrus announced that Plastic Hearts would be the new album title in October 2020. It was released on November 27, 2020.

== Composition ==
She Is Coming is a pop project with hip hop, rock and trap influences and R&B elements. Cyrus described the three EPs to be "seasonal" in nature, and related She Is Coming to "[wanting to feel] light and feel the warmth" of early summer compared to She Is Here and She Is Everything being "colder and a little darker" as the release cycle was planned to extend into the fall. However, the planned EP trilogy was cancelled, due to major recent changes in her life that did not fit the essence of the project, including Cyrus' divorce from Liam Hemsworth, and the burning of the couple's house during the Woolsey Fire in California, as well as the singer's vocal cord surgery. Cyrus ended up using some of the recorded material for Plastic Hearts.

== Promotion ==
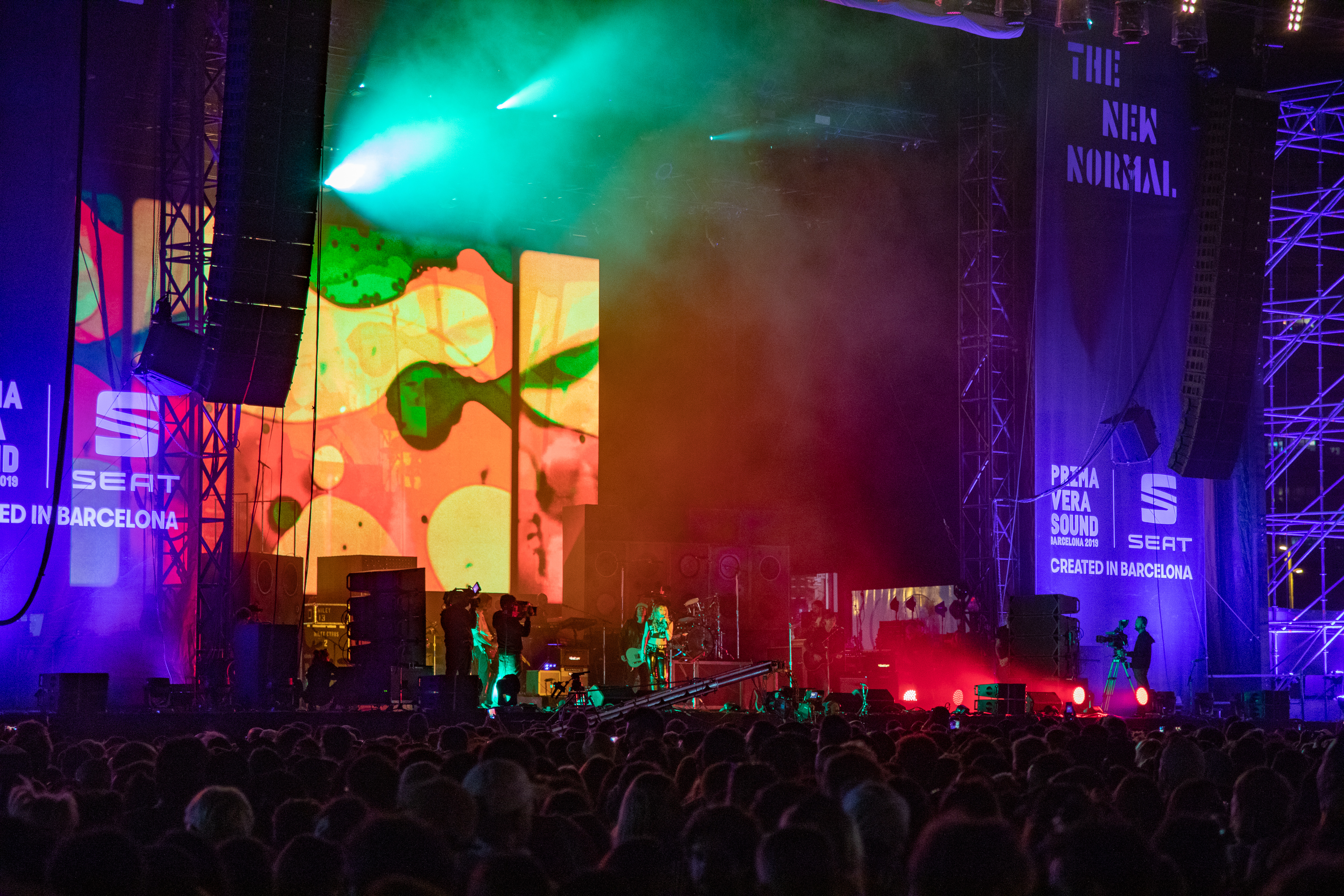
Cyrus performing in Barcelona at Primavera Sound, May 2019

Sam Keywanfar, founder of the media buying company MilkMoney, acknowledged that Cyrus conceptualized much of the marketing campaign for She Is Coming. Cyrus launched the hotline 1-833-SHE-IS-MC, which randomly plays messages prerecorded by Cyrus and prompts callers to leave a message, to coincide with the release of She Is Coming. International versions of the phone number were launched in Australia, Canada, Peru, Poland, Singapore, Spain, and the United Kingdom. The American hotline phone number appeared on out-of-home advertisements in Las Vegas, Los Angeles, Miami, Nashville, New York City, and London for four weeks following the release of the EP. It is a motif on several pieces of merchandise from her online store, including a condom being sold for US$20 that was particularly discussed.

Cyrus first performed "Cattitude", "D.R.E.A.M.", and "Mother's Daughter", the lead single, at BBC Radio 1's Big Weekend in North Yorkshire on May 25, 2019. Cyrus performed at Primavera Sound in Barcelona on May 31, the Orange Warsaw Festival in Warsaw on June 1, Tinderbox in Odense on June 28, the Glastonbury Festival in Somerset on June 30 and the Sunny Hill Festival in Pristina on August 2. In the United States, she performed at the 2019 iHeartRadio Music Festival in Las Vegas on September 21. Tom Poleman, president of national programming for iHeartMedia, stated that Cyrus' participation was a significant factor in "driving ticket sales for the event." Cyrus was scheduled to headline Woodstock 50 in Watkins Glen, New York on August 16. Her participation was confirmed when the event lineup was announced on March 19; she withdrew from the lineup on July 30, and the event was cancelled altogether the following day.

=== Singles ===
"Mother's Daughter" was released as the lead single from She Is Coming on May 31, 2019.

"Slide Away" was originally released as a standalone single on August 16, 2019, and was later added to the EP on the project's fourth anniversary.

== Critical reception ==
Professional ratings
Aggregate scores
Source	Rating
AnyDecentMusic?	6.1/10
Metacritic	64/100
Review scores
Source	Rating
AllMusic	2.5/5 stars
Consequence of Sound	B−
The Guardian	4/5 stars
Los Angeles Times	positive
NME	4/5 stars
Pitchfork	4.6/10
Slant Magazine	2.5/5 stars

At Metacritic, which assigns a normalized rating out of 100 to reviews from mainstream critics, the EP received an average score of 64 indicating "generally favorable reviews". Aimee Cliff from The Guardian felt that She Is Coming successfully blended musical influences from Cyrus' previous releases "without resorting to extreme stereotypes" in terms of promotion, and complimented Cyrus for "making some of the best pop songs she has made in years." Mikael Wood from the Los Angeles Times described the EP "as a means of keeping up with the kids" that have emerged in the industry since Cyrus' last project, and complimented it for possessing "a daffy energy that reminds you why it was fun to pay attention to Cyrus in the first place."

== Commercial performance ==
She Is Coming debuted at number five on the US Billboard 200 with 36,000 album-equivalent units, of which 12,000 were pure album sales. It is Cyrus' 12th top-ten entry on the chart.

As of July 2023, the extended version of the EP was streamed more than 800 million times on Spotify.

== Track listing ==
She Is Coming track listing
No.	Title	Writer(s)	Producer(s)	Length
1.	"Mother's Daughter"	Miley Cyrus; Andrew Wyatt; Alma Miettinen	Wyatt	3:39
2.	"Unholy"	Cyrus; Wyatt; Ilsey Juber; Jasper Sheff; John Cunningham	Cunningham; Sheff	2:10
3.	"D.R.E.A.M." (featuring Ghostface Killah)	Cyrus; Cunningham; Juber; Clifford Smith; Corey Woods; David Porter; Dennis Coles; Isaac Hayes; Jason Hunter; Lamont Hawkins; Robert Diggs; Russell Jones	Cunningham; RZA	2:48
4.	"Cattitude" (featuring RuPaul)	Cyrus; Wyatt; Miettinen; Juber; RuPaul Andre Charles	Wyatt; King Henry	3:09
5.	"Party Up the Street" (with Swae Lee and Mike Will Made It)	Cyrus; Wyatt; Khalif Malik Ibn Shaman Brown; Asheton Hogan; Michael Williams II	Mike Will Made It; Pluss	3:37
6.	"The Most"	Cyrus; Juber; Mark Ronson; Jonny Price; Marcus Lomax; Stefan Johnson; Brandon Joyner Burton	Ronson; BJ Burton	3:41
Total length:				19:05

2023 reissue bonus track
No.	Title	Writer(s)	Producer(s)	Length
7.	"Slide Away"	Cyrus; Miettinen; Wyatt; Williams II	Wyatt; Mike Will Made It	3:54
Total length:				23:00

=== Notes ===
- Revised version includes the White Panda Remix of "Mother's Daughter".

=== Sample credits ===
- "D.R.E.A.M." samples Wu Tang Clan's "C.R.E.A.M."
- "Cattitude" samples "Sweet Pussycat of Mine" by RuPaul.

== Charts ==
Chart performance for She Is Coming
Chart (2019)	Peak position
Australian Albums (ARIA)	10
Austrian Albums (Ö3 Austria)	21
Belgian Albums (Ultratop Flanders)	21
Belgian Albums (Ultratop Wallonia)	35
Canadian Albums (Billboard)	4
Czech Albums (ČNS IFPI)	9
Danish Albums (Hitlisten)	12
Finnish Albums (Suomen virallinen lista)	11
French Albums (SNEP)	85
German Albums (Offizielle Top 100)	74
Irish Albums (IRMA)	19
Italian Albums (FIMI)	44
Latvian Albums (LAIPA)	6
Lithuanian Albums (AGATA)	4
New Zealand Albums (RMNZ)	14
Norwegian Albums (VG-lista)	4
Scottish Albums (Official Charts)	35
Spanish Albums (Promusicae)	17
Swedish Albums (Sverigetopplistan)	17
Swiss Albums (Schweizer Hitparade)	27
UK Albums (Official Charts)	18
US Billboard 200	5

== Certifications ==
Certifications for She Is Coming
Region	Certification	Certified units/sales
Brazil (Pro-Música Brasil)	Gold	20,000^{‡}
Poland (ZPAV)	Gold	10,000^{‡}
^{‡} Sales+streaming figures based on certification alone.
