= List of songs recorded by Miley Cyrus =

Songs by American singer and actress

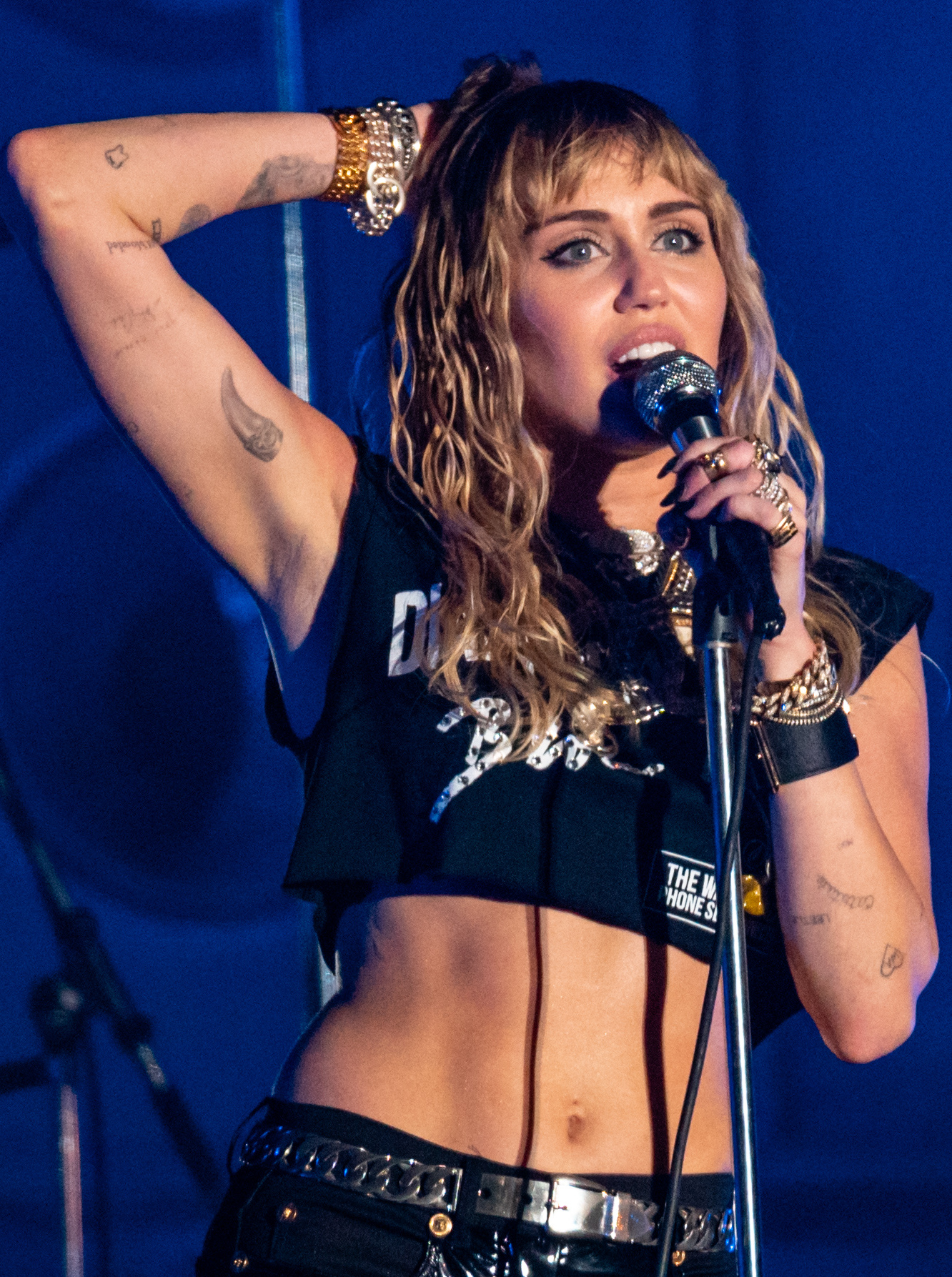
Cyrus performing on Primavera Sound in Barcelona, May 2019

American singer Miley Cyrus has recorded songs for eight studio albums, five soundtrack albums, two EPs and other album or singles appearances. Some of her songs are credited to the fictional characters she has played: Hannah Montana and Ashley O.

She first came to prominence within the entertainment industry for her portrayal of Hannah Montana in the television series of the same name, which premiered in March 2006. Cyrus is credited as Hannah Montana for eight of the thirteen tracks featured on its first soundtrack album Hannah Montana, which was released in October 2006. Matthew Gerrard was responsible for much of its songwriting and production, and tended towards a "sugary - sweet" sound. In 2006, Cyrus additionally signed a recording contract with Hollywood Records. The following year, Walt Disney Records and Hollywood Records jointly released the double album Hannah Montana 2: Meet Miley Cyrus; the first disc served as the soundtrack album for the second season of Hannah Montana, while the second disc served as Cyrus' debut studio album. Cyrus' music incorporated prominent elements of pop and pop rock musical styles; she shared writing credits with Antonina Armato and Tim James, who collectively form the production team Rock Mafia, on the tracks "See You Again", "Let's Dance", "Right Here", and "Good and Broken". "See You Again" was serviced as the lead single from the record, and became Cyrus' first top-ten entry on the U.S. Billboard Hot 100.

Cyrus' second studio album Breakout (2008) was her first record released separately from the Hannah Montana franchise. She again collaborated with Armato and James during its production; together, they co-wrote "7 Things", "Fly on the Wall", "Bottom of the Ocean", "Wake Up America", and "Goodbye". In 2009, Cyrus recorded and released the soundtrack albums Hannah Montana: The Movie and Hannah Montana 3, which were credited to Montana. The lead single from the former record, "The Climb", was written by Jessi Alexander and Jon Mabe. "Party in the U.S.A." was written by Jessie J, Dr. Luke, and Claude Kelly for her first extended play The Time of Our Lives (2009); its songwriting was largely handled by Dr. Luke, Kelly, and John Shanks. Cyrus released her third studio album Can't Be Tamed in June 2010; Cyrus co-wrote much of its material with Armato, James, and Shanks, including the lead single "Can't Be Tamed"; the song peaked at number eight on the Billboard Hot 100. The record was followed by the soundtrack Hannah Montana Forever in October 2010.

Cyrus left Hollywood Records and subsequently joined RCA Records in 2013; her fourth studio album Bangerz was released through the label that October. Cyrus expressed intentions of incorporating elements of "dirty south hip-hop" into the record. Consequently, she co-wrote several of its tracks with hip hop producer Mike Will Made It, who handled most of its production; Pharrell Williams also co-wrote four songs for the album. The lead single "We Can't Stop" reached number two on the Billboard Hot 100, while its second single "Wrecking Ball" became Cyrus' first track to peak at number one in the United States. In August 2015 she released her fifth studio album, Miley Cyrus & Her Dead Petz, was available for free streaming on SoundCloud. In September 2017 she released her sixth studio album, Younger Now. In 2019 she released her second major extended play, She Is Coming, and two songs recorded as Ashley O for the television series Black Mirror. In November 2020 she released her seventh studio album, Plastic Hearts. In March 2021 she left RCA Records and subsequently joined Columbia Records. Her eight studio album, Endless Summer Vacation, was released in March 2023. Her ninth studio album, Something Beautiful was released in May 2025, accompanied by a visual film.

== Songs ==
Key
†	Indicates songs covered by Miley Cyrus
‡	Indicates song written solely by Miley Cyrus
#	Indicates songs with background vocals by Miley Cyrus

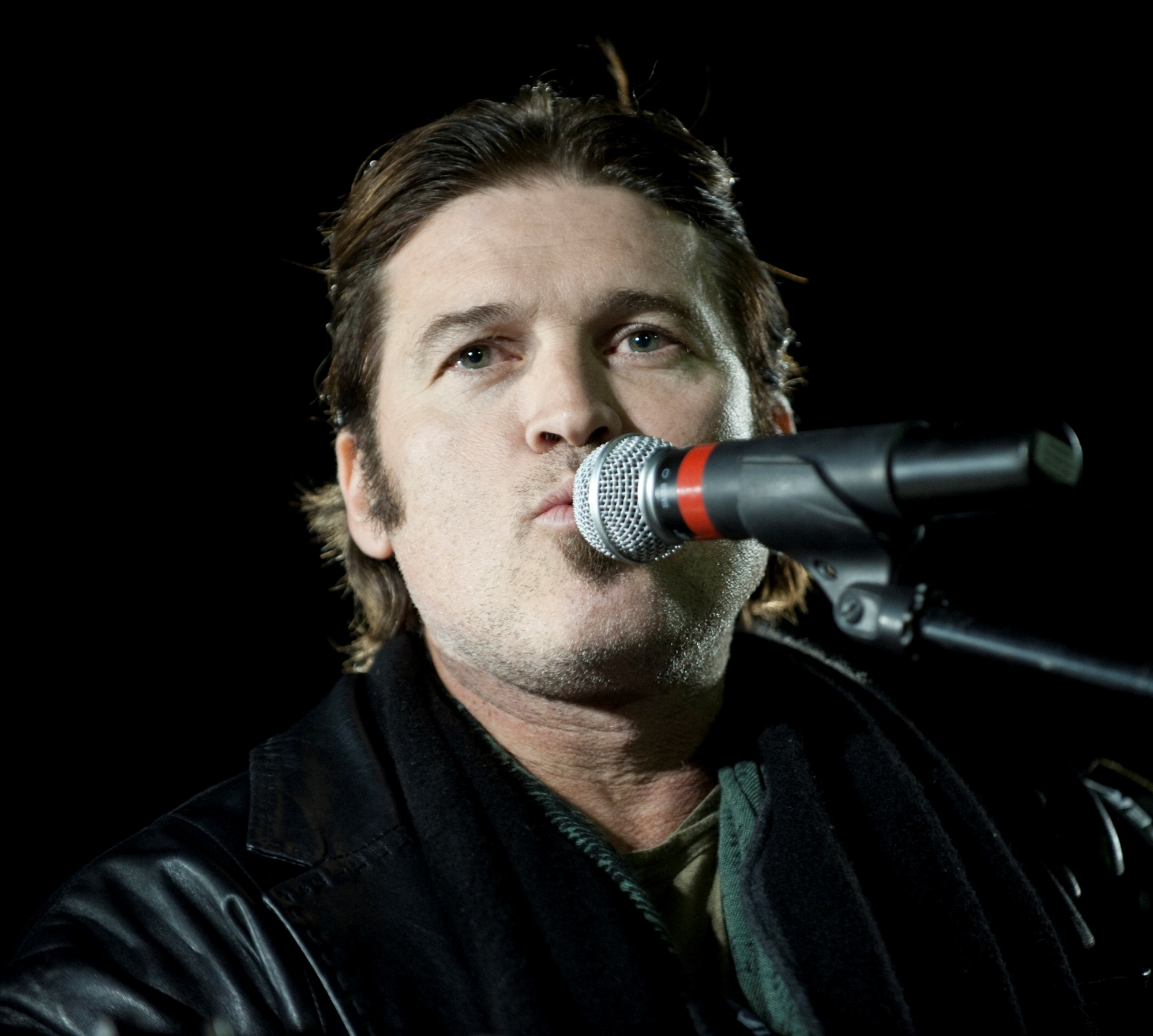
Billy Ray Cyrus (pictured) collaborated with Cyrus, his daughter, on seven songs.

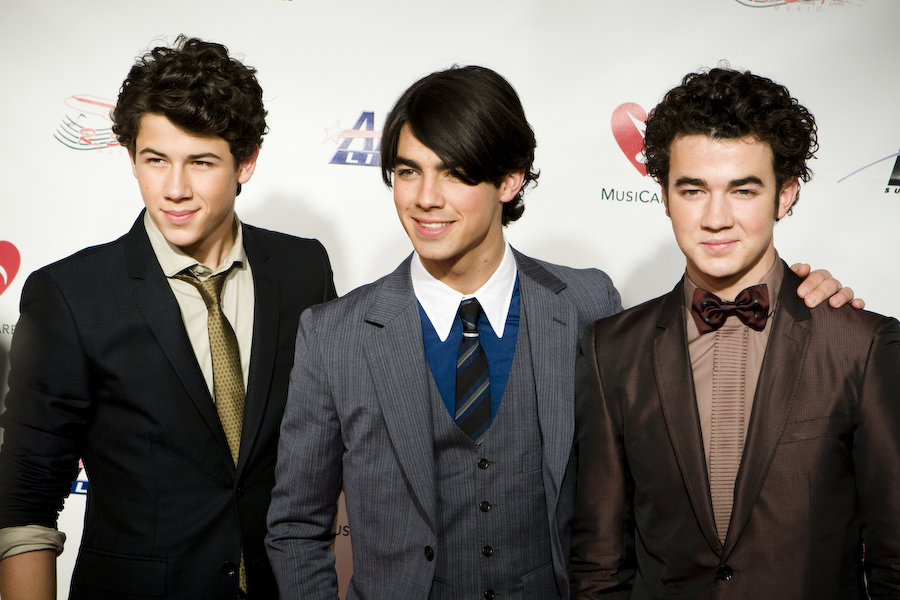
Jonas Brothers (pictured) collaborated with Cyrus on "We Got the Party", "Before the Storm" and "Send It On".

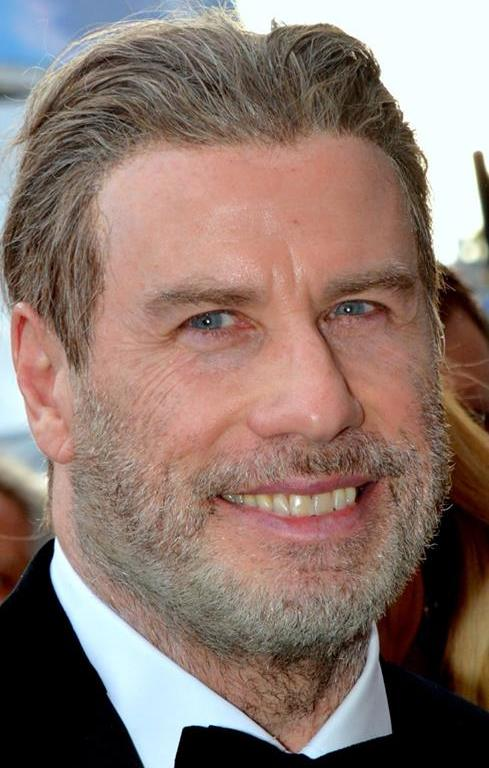
John Travolta (pictured) collaborated with Cyrus on "I Thought I Lost You".

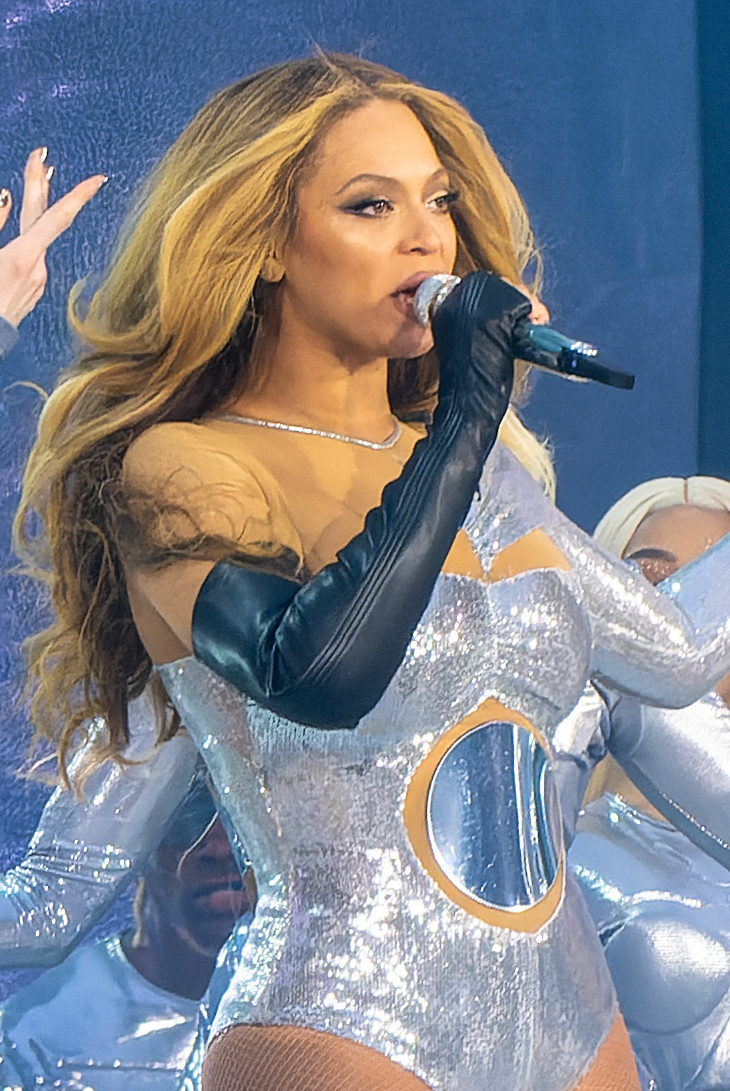
Beyoncé (pictured) collaborated with Cyrus on "Just Stand Up!" and "II Most Wanted".

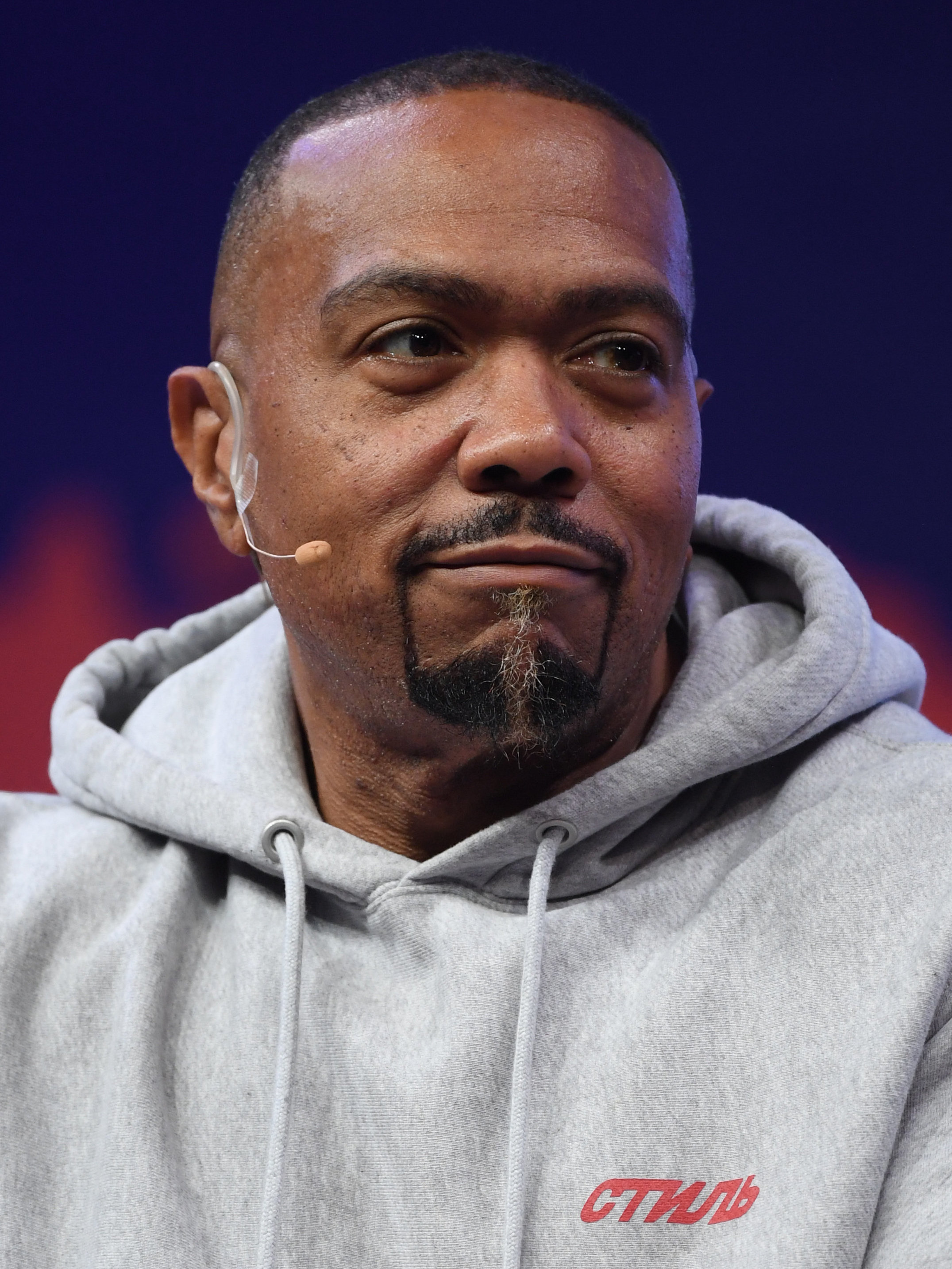
Timbaland (pictured) collaborated with Cyrus on "We Belong to the Music".

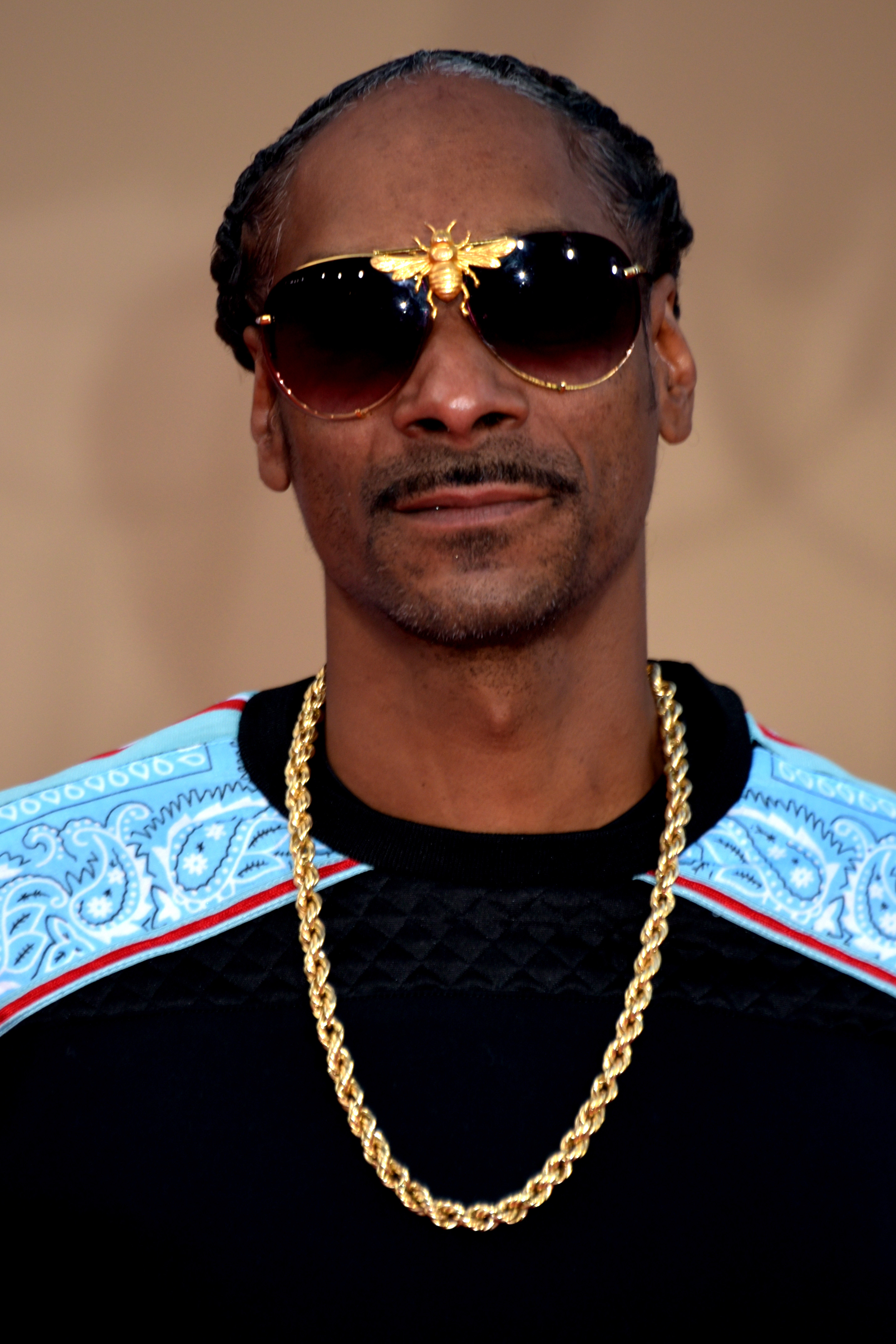
Snoop Dogg (pictured) collaborated with Cyrus on "We Are the World 25 for Haiti" and "Ashtrays and Heartbreaks".

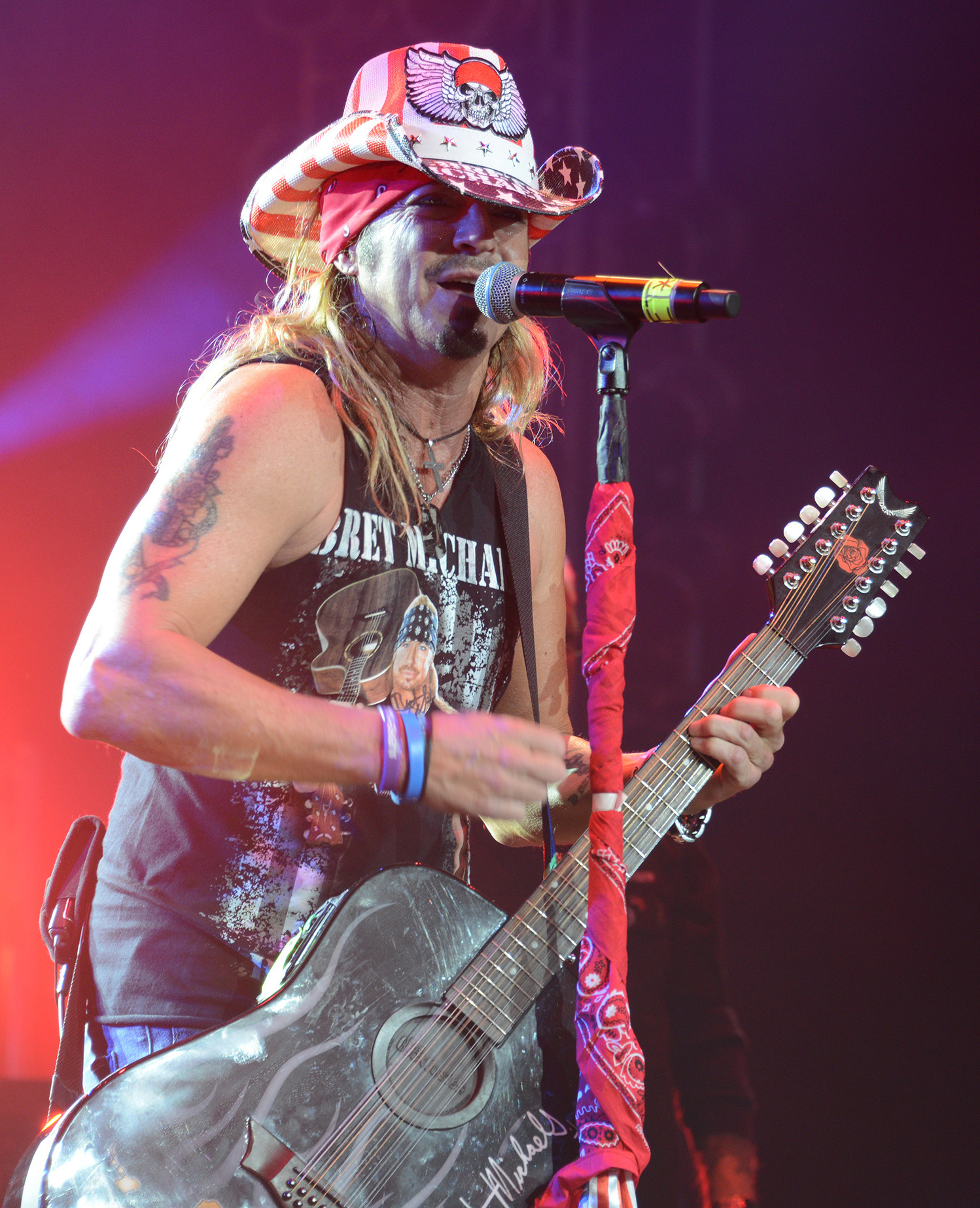
Bret Michaels (pictured) collaborated with Cyrus on "Nothing to Lose".

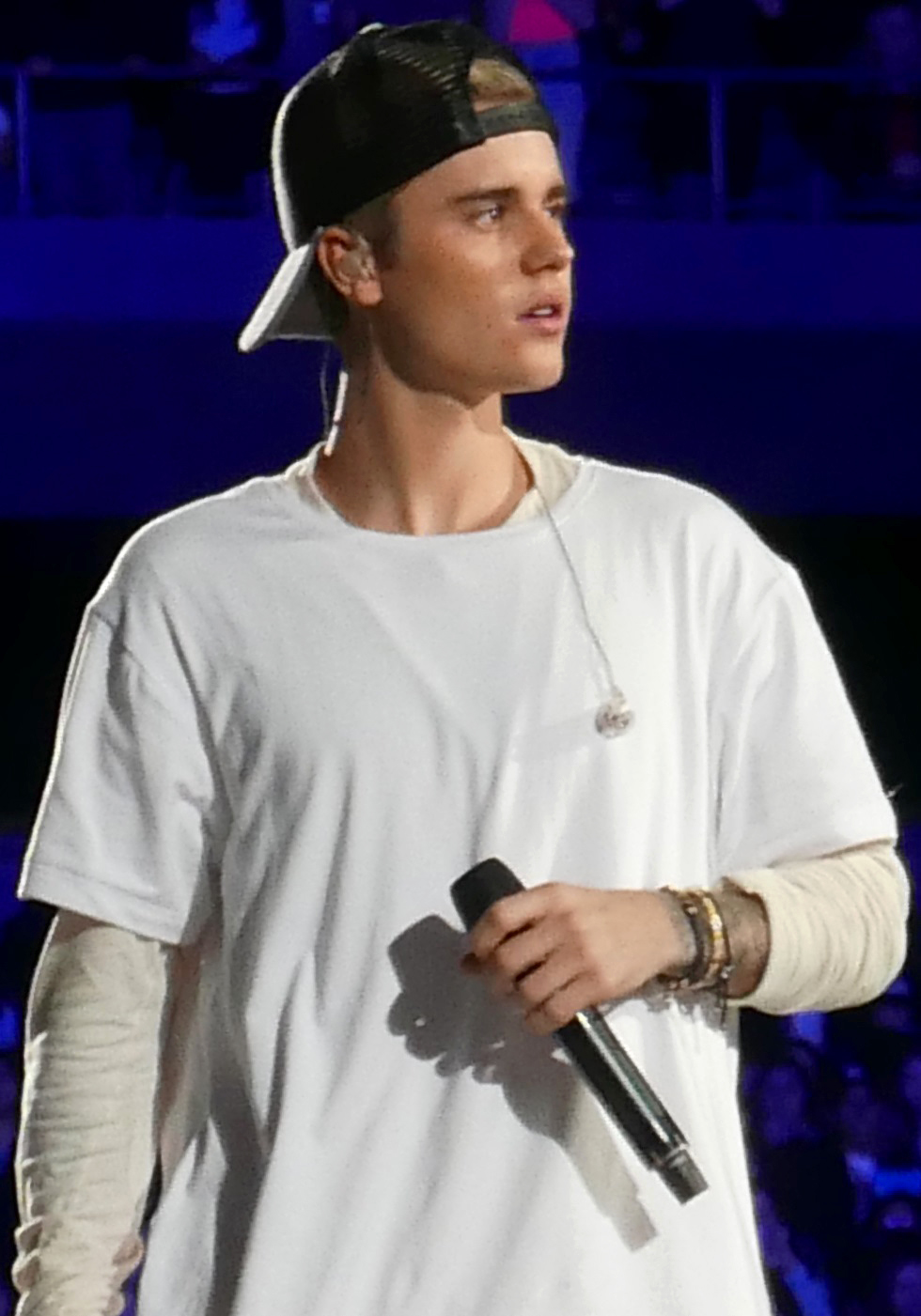
Justin Bieber (pictured) collaborated with Cyrus on "Overbroad".

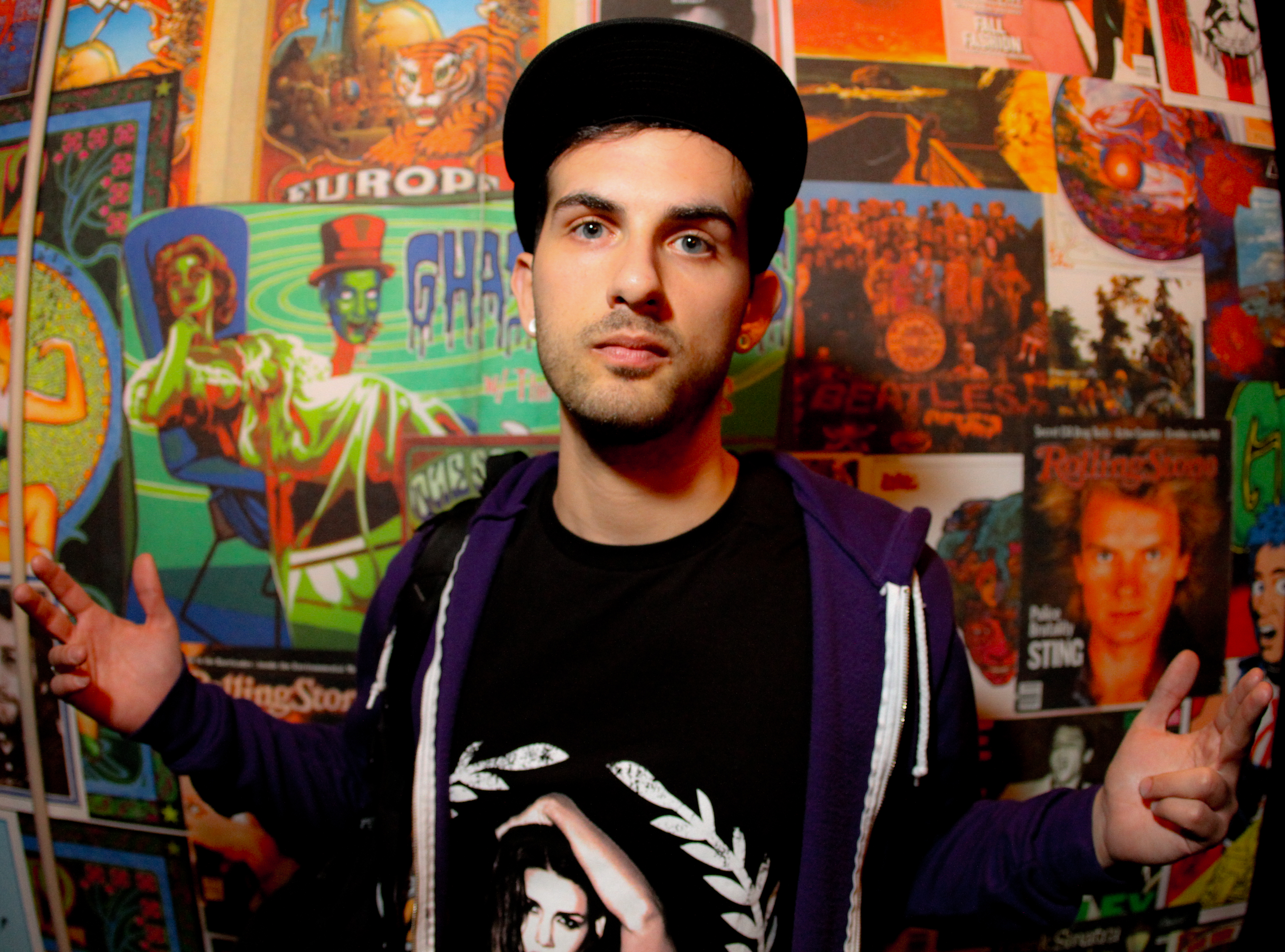
Borgore (pictured) collaborated with Cyrus on "Decisions".

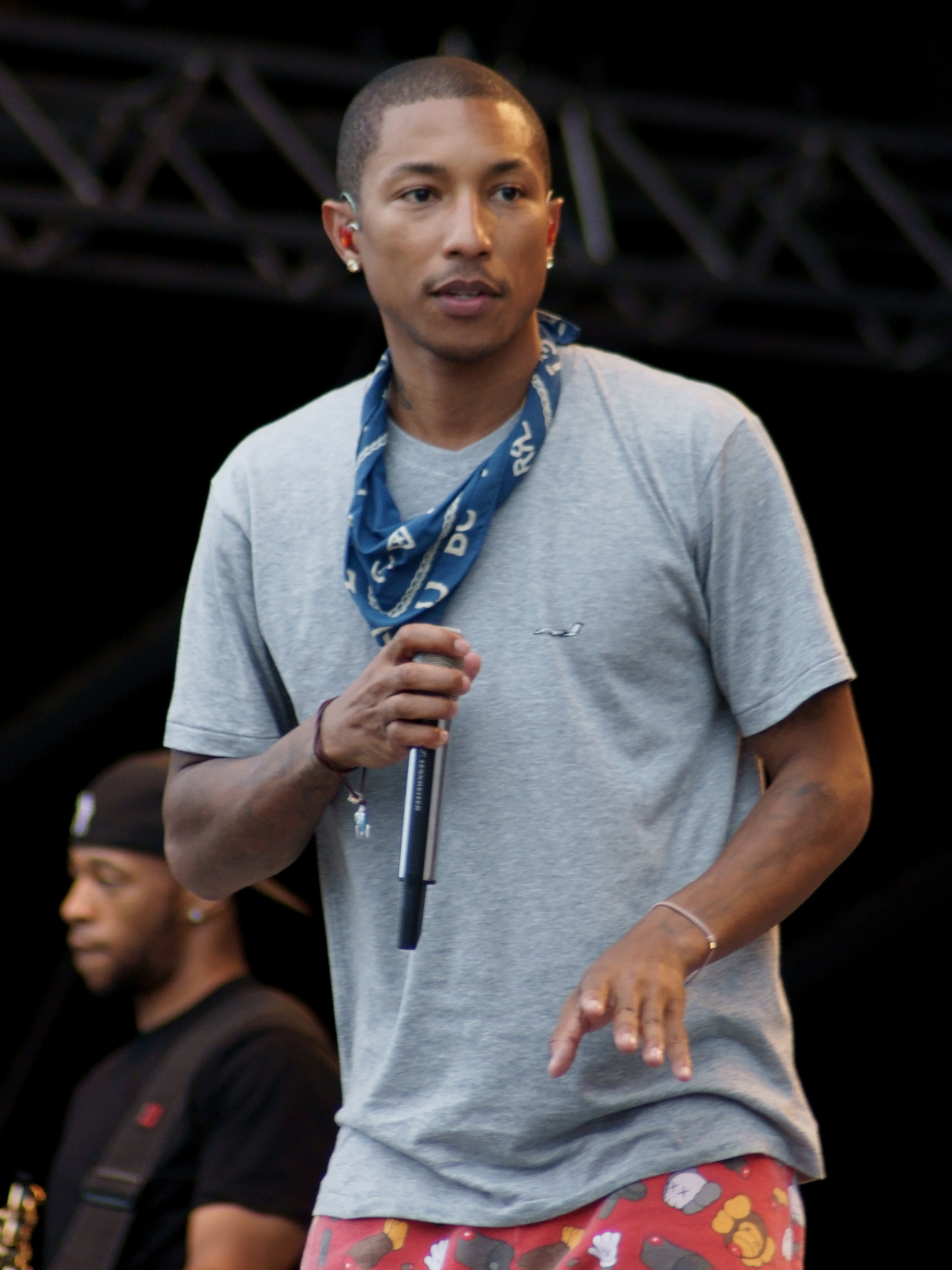
Pharrell Williams (pictured) collaborated with Cyrus on "Doctor (Work It Out)" and co-wrote four songs on Bangerz. Cyrus also provided vocals on his song "Come Get It Bae".

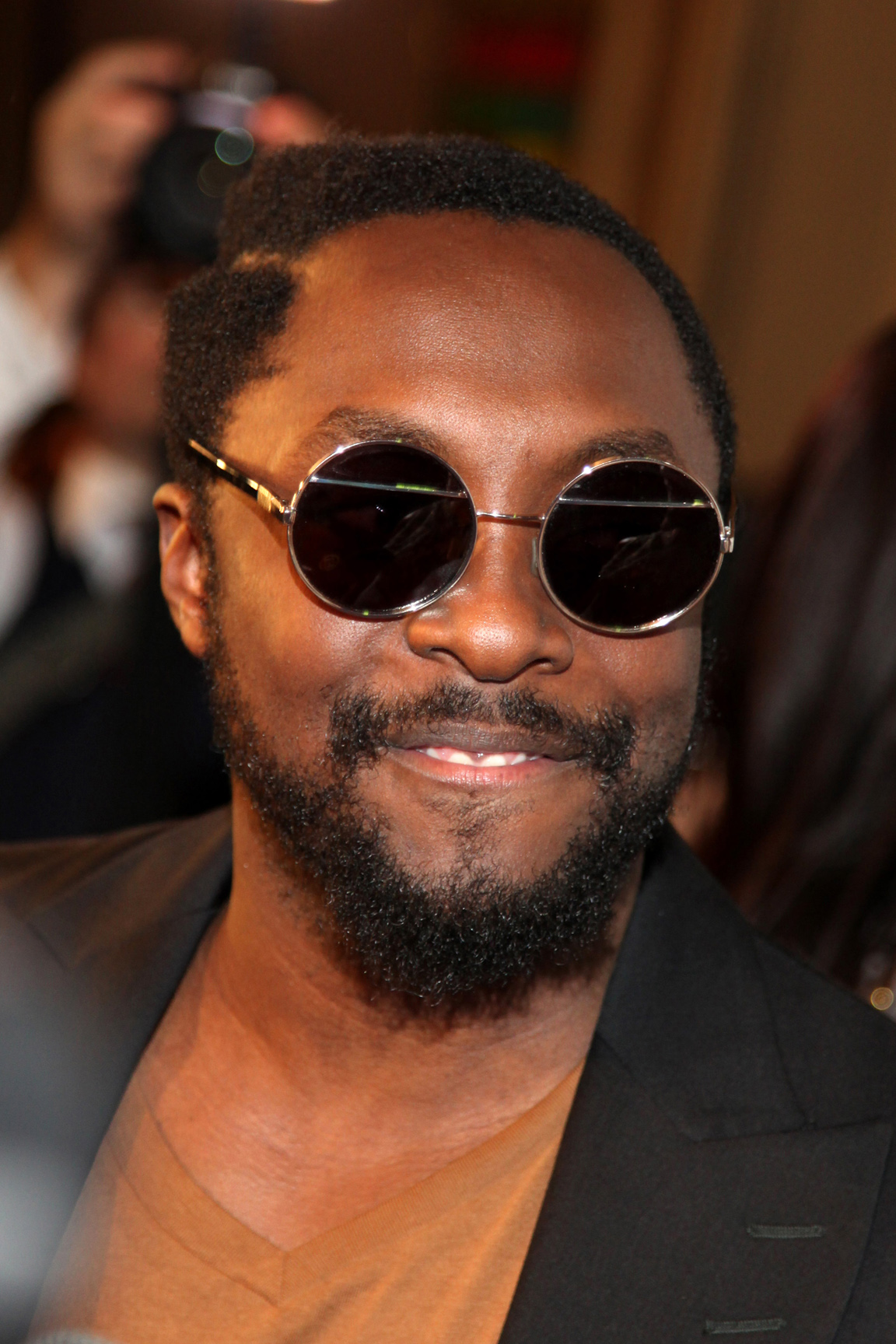
will.i.am (pictured) collaborated with Cyrus on "Fall Down" and "Feelin' Myself". He also co-wrote "Do My Thang".

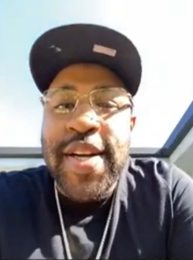
Mike Will Made It (pictured) collaborated with Cyrus on "23". He also co-wrote several songs on Bangerz, She Is Coming and Endless Summer Vacation.

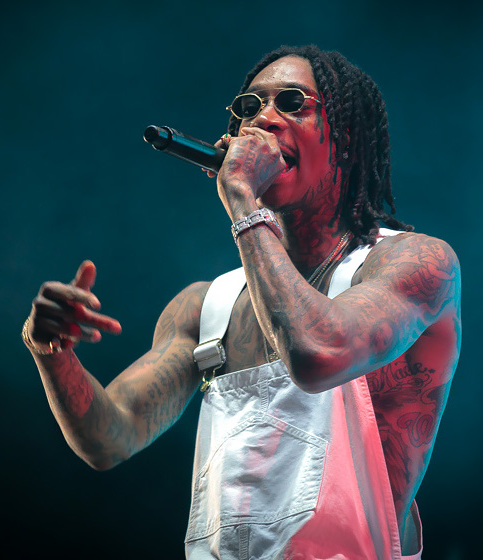
Wiz Khalifa (pictured) collaborated with Cyrus on "23" and "Feelin' Myself".

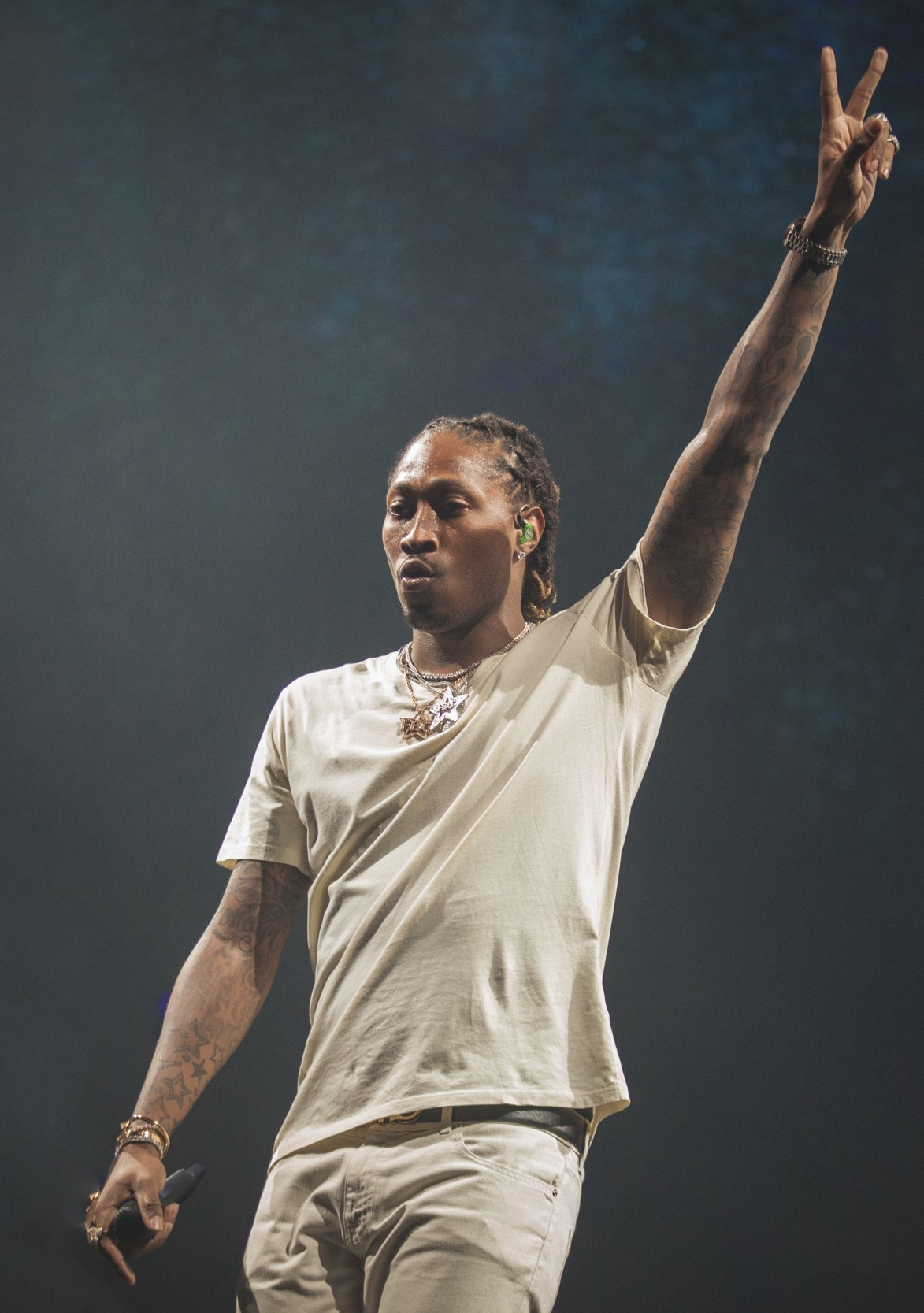
Future (pictured) collaborated with Cyrus on "My Darlin'" and "Real and True". He also co-wrote "Love Money Party".

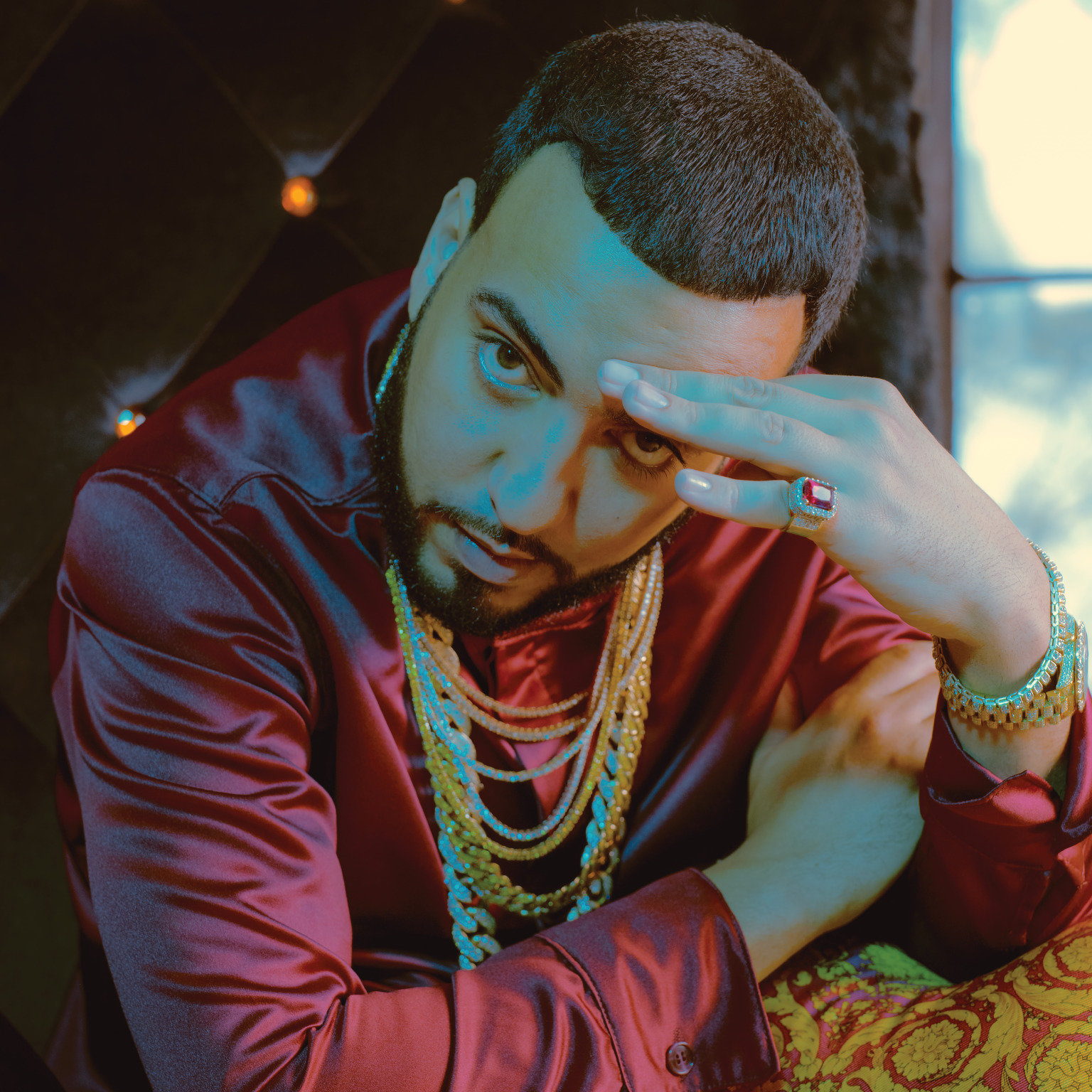
French Montana (pictured) collaborated with Cyrus on "FU" and "Feelin' Myself".

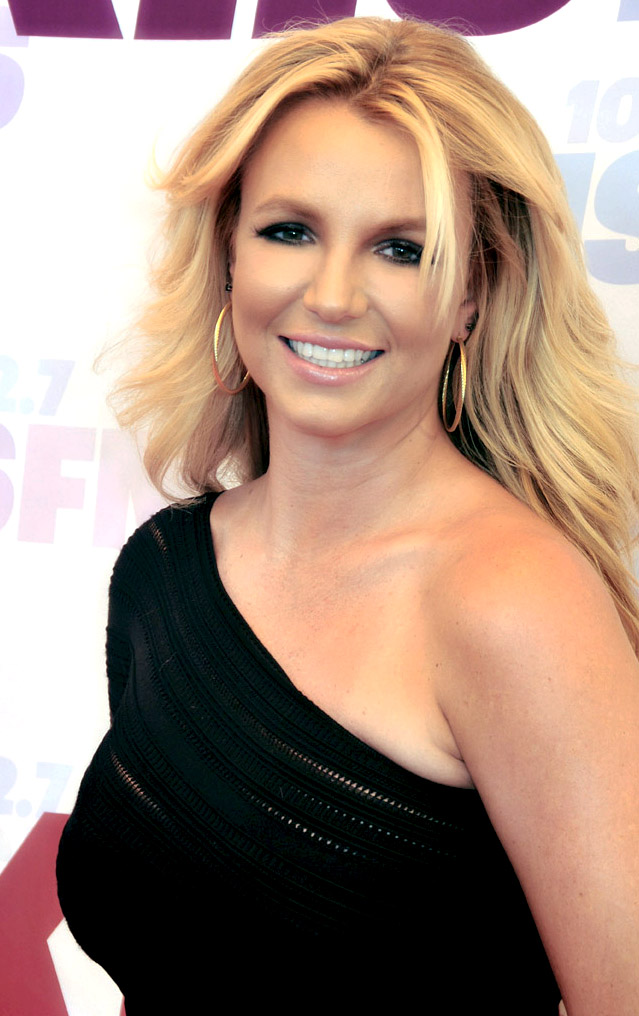
Britney Spears (pictured) collaborated with Cyrus on "SMS (Bangerz)".

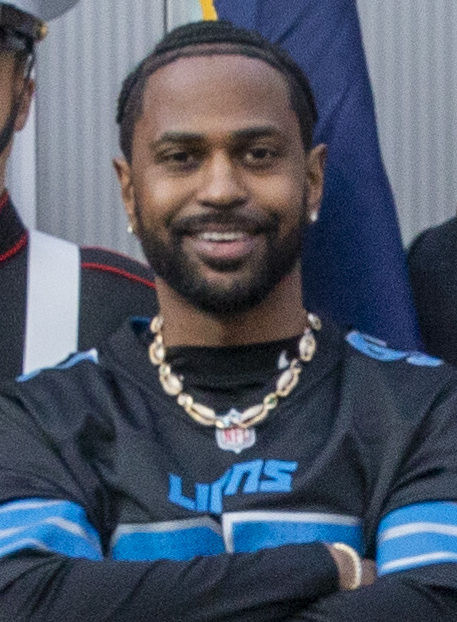
Big Sean (pictured) collaborated with Cyrus on "Love Money Party" and "Tangerine".

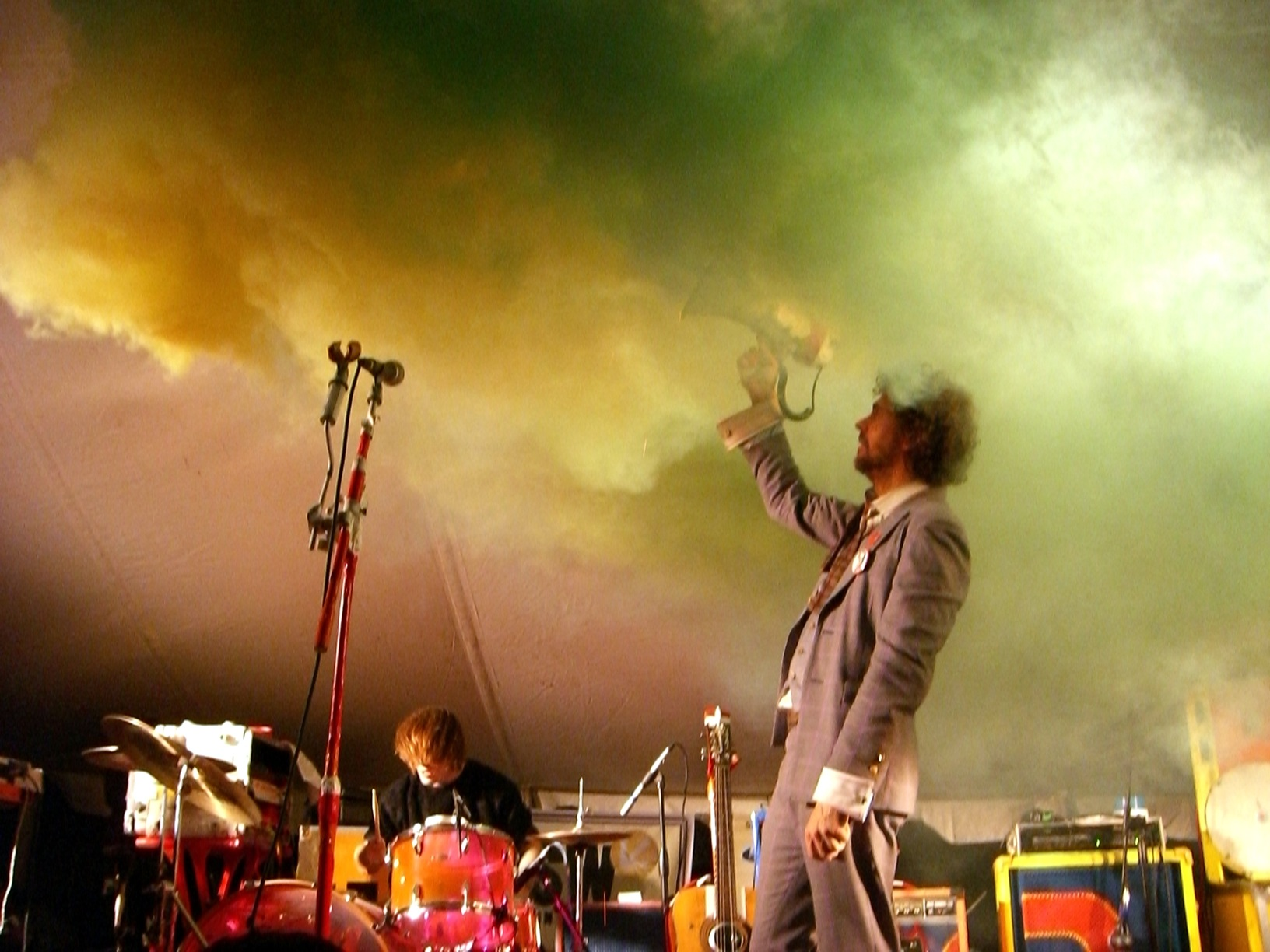
The Flaming Lips (pictured) collaborated with Cyrus on "Lucy in the Sky with Diamonds", "A Day in the Life" and "We a Famly".

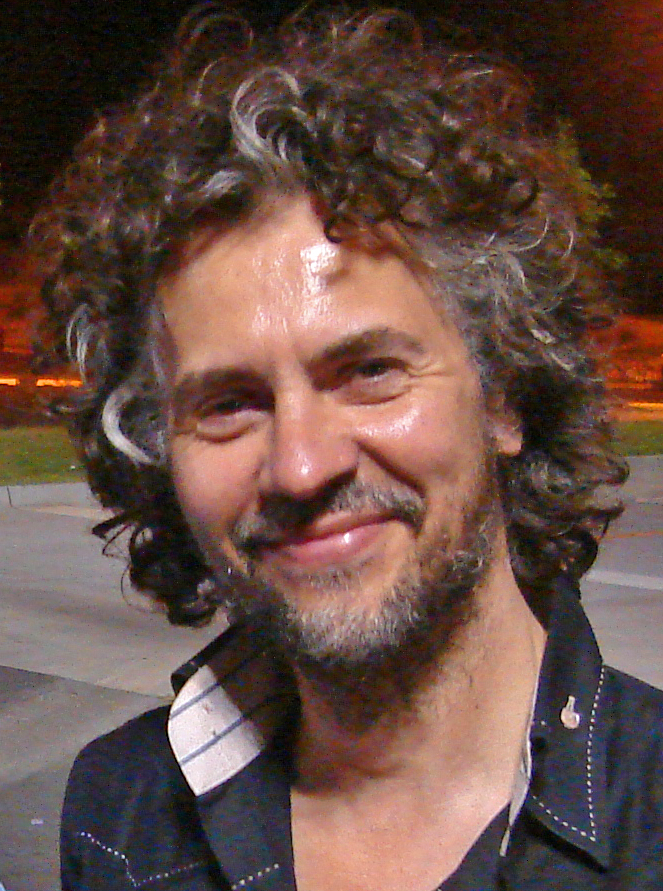
Wayne Coyne (pictured) co-wrote eleven songs on Miley Cyrus & Her Dead Petz.

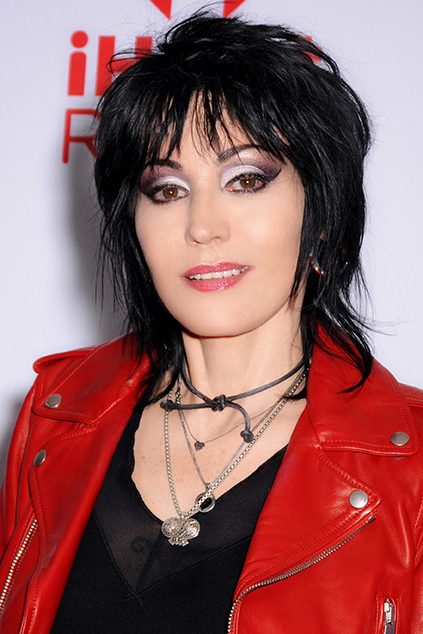
Joan Jett (pictured) collaborated with Cyrus on "Crimson and Clover", "Androgynous" and "Bad Karma".

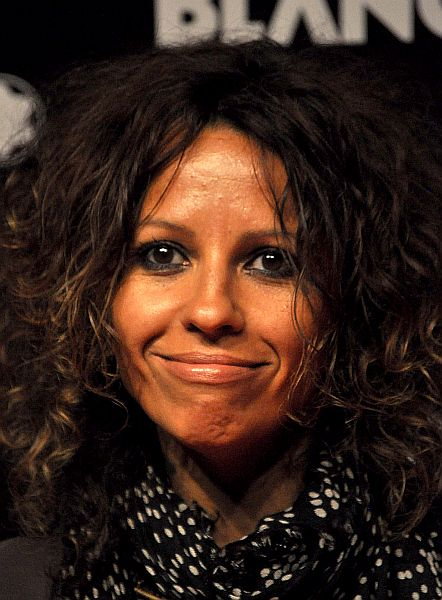
Linda Perry (pictured) wrote "Hands of Love".

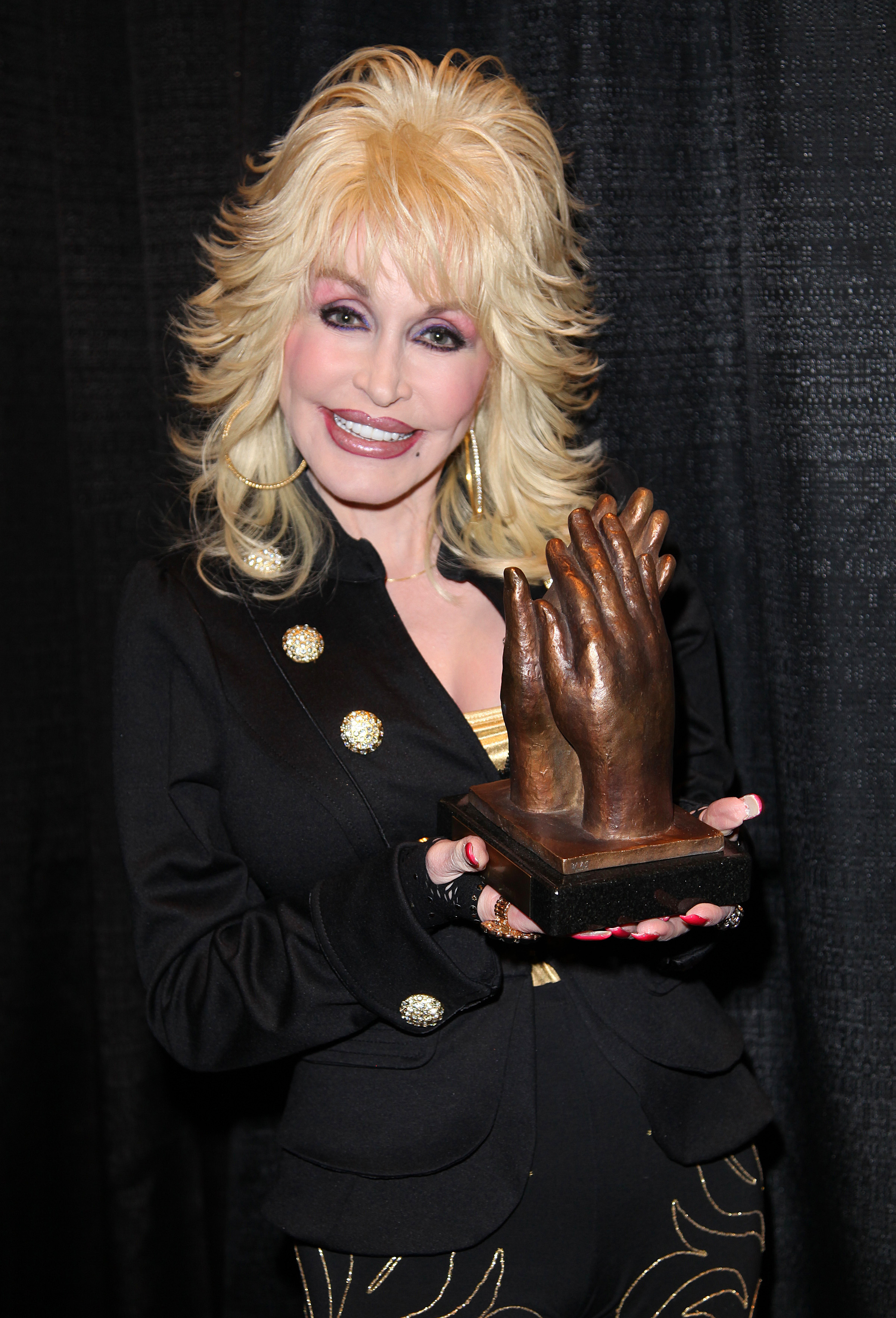
Dolly Parton (pictured) collaborated with Cyrus on "Rainbowland", "Christmas Is", "Wrecking Ball" and "Light of a Clear Blue Morning". Cyrus also covered her song "Jolene".

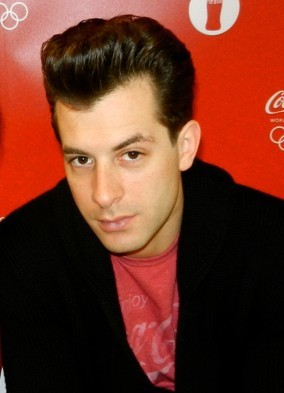
Mark Ronson (pictured) collaborated with Cyrus on "Nothing Breaks Like a Heart" and "Happy Xmas (War Is Over)". He also co-wrote two songs on She Is Coming and "Dream as One".

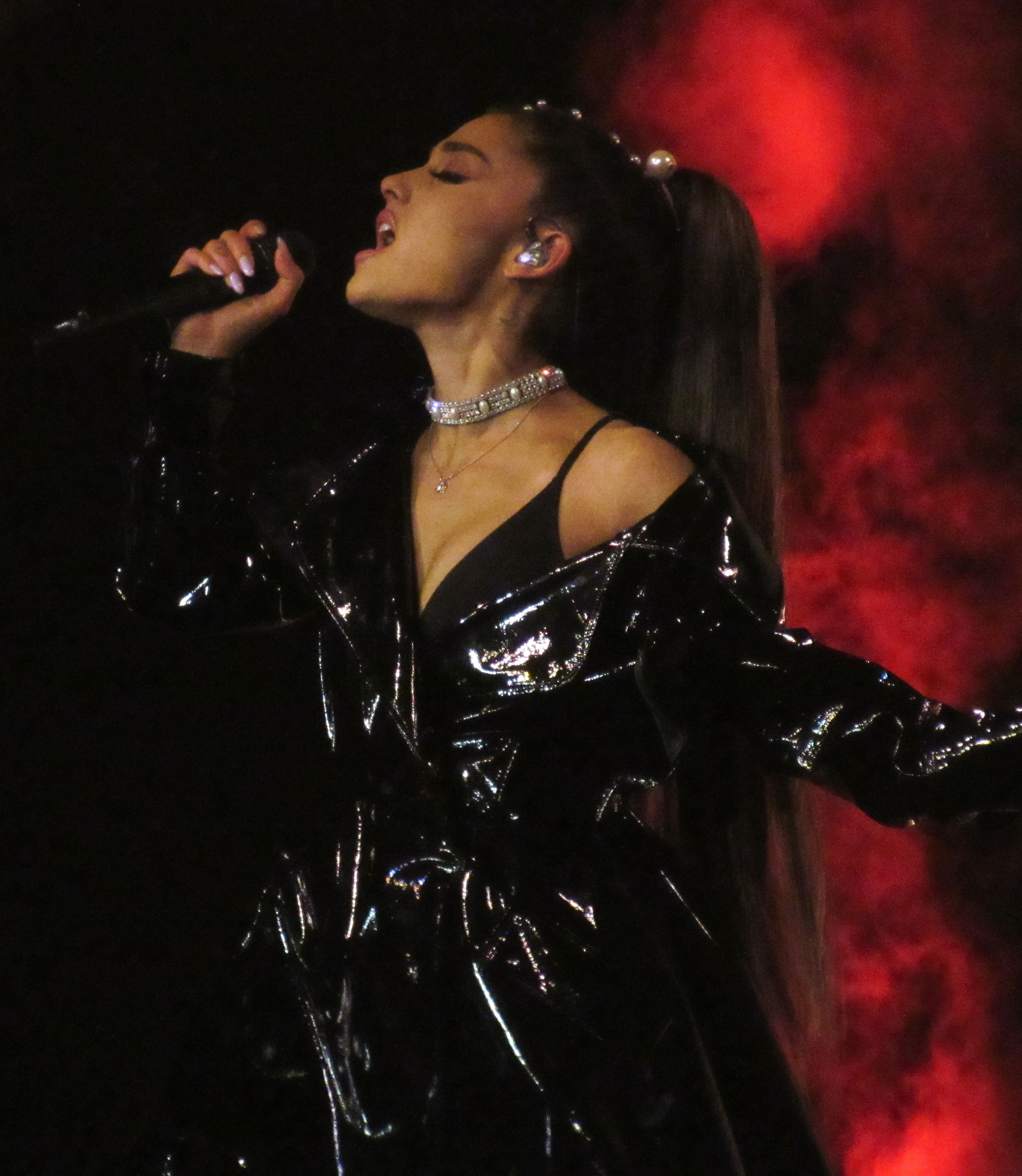
Ariana Grande (pictured) collaborated with Cyrus on "Don't Call Me Angel".

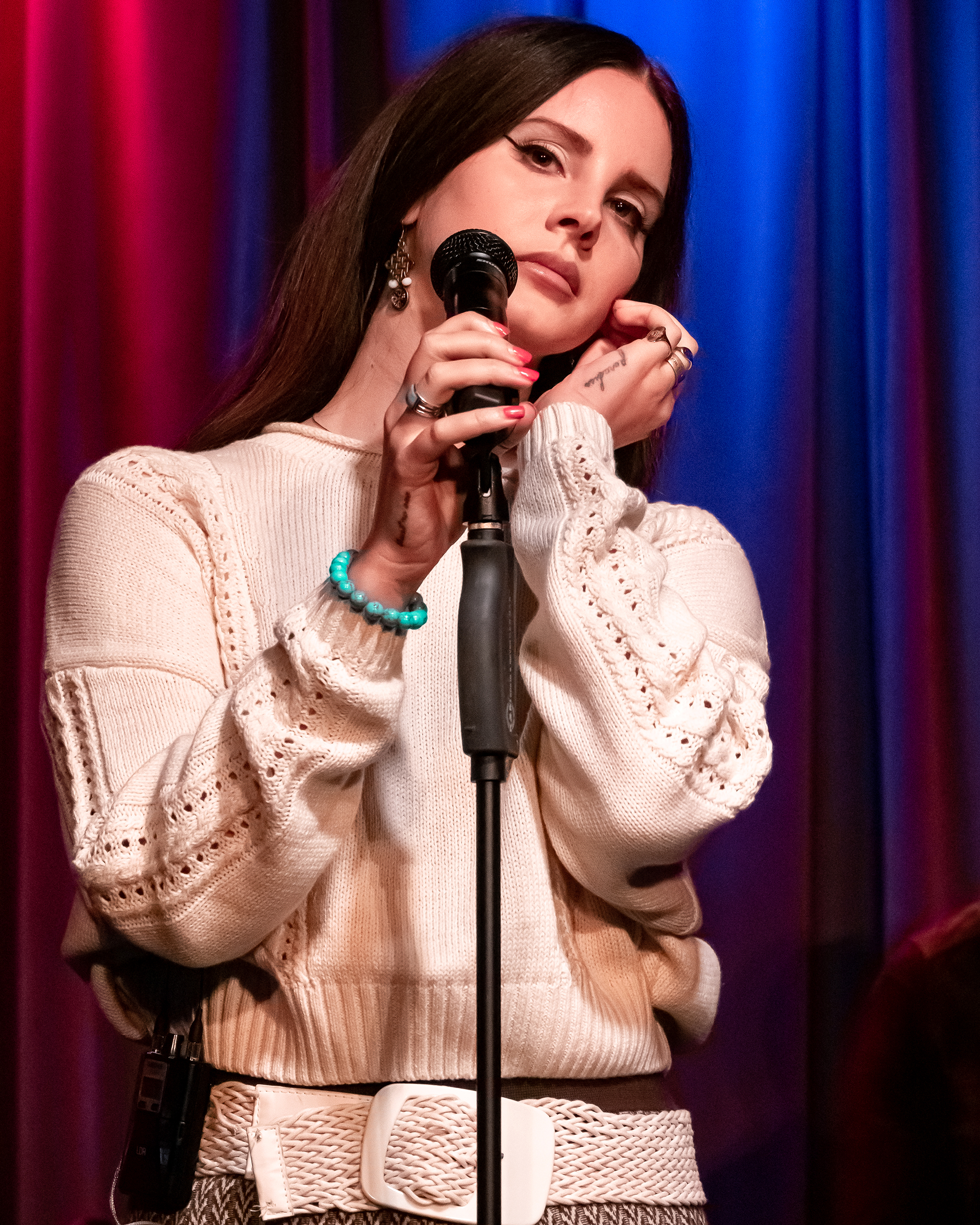
Lana Del Rey (pictured) collaborated with Cyrus on "Don't Call Me Angel". Cyrus also covered her song "Summertime Sadness".

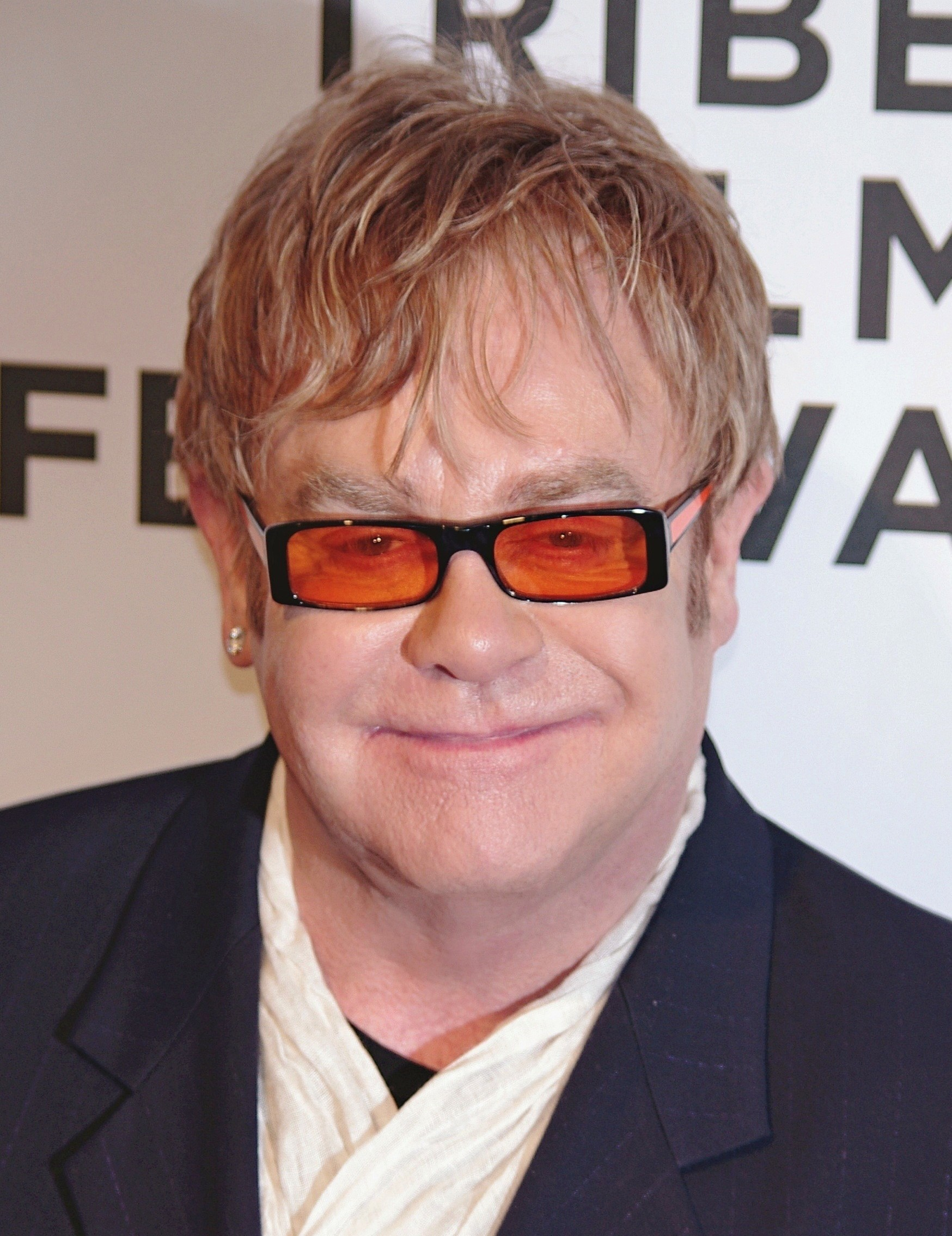
Elton John (pictured) collaborated with Cyrus on "Nothing Else Matters". Cyrus also covered his songs "The Bitch Is Back" and "Don't Let the Sun Go Down on Me".

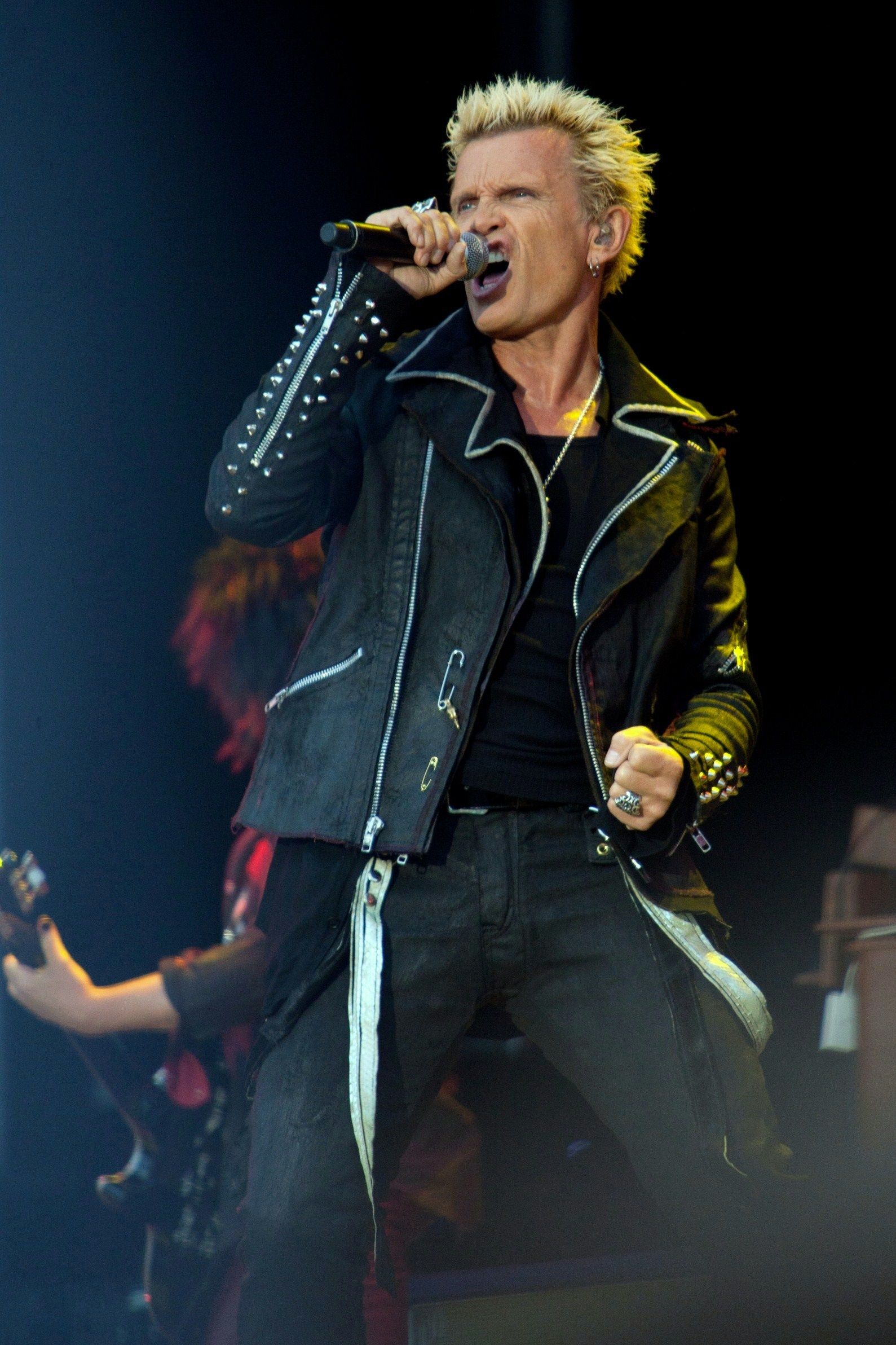
Billy Idol (pictured) collaborated with Cyrus on "Night Crawling".

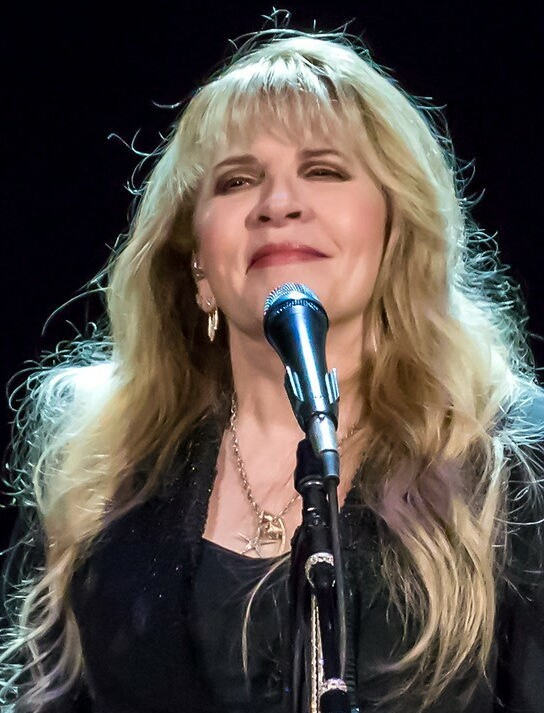
Stevie Nicks (pictured) collaborated with Cyrus on "Edge of Midnight (Midnight Sky Remix)".

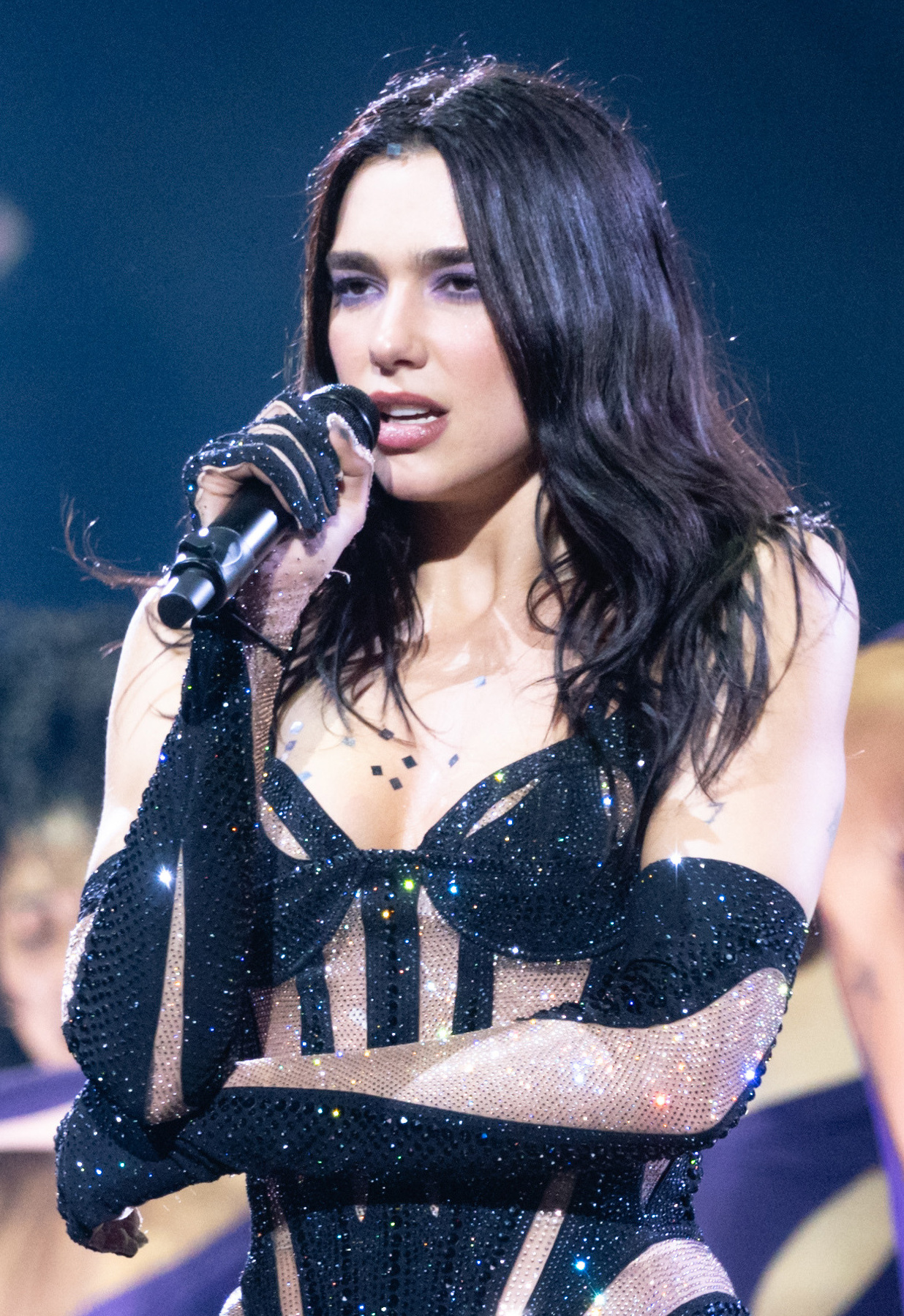
Dua Lipa (pictured) collaborated with Cyrus on "Prisoner".

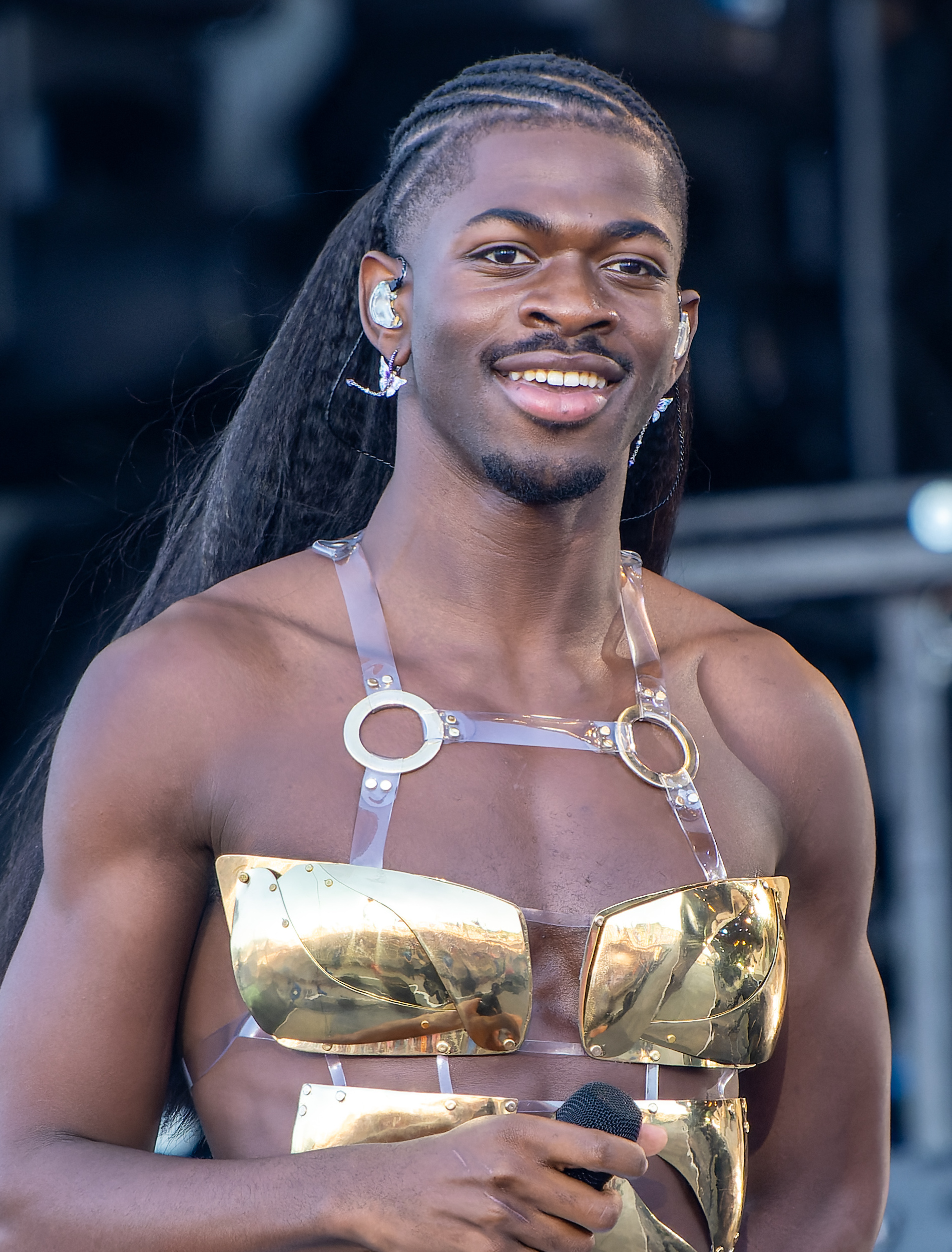
Lil Nas X (pictured) collaborated with Cyrus on "Am I Dreaming".

The Kid Laroi (pictured) collaborated with Cyrus on the remix of "Without You".

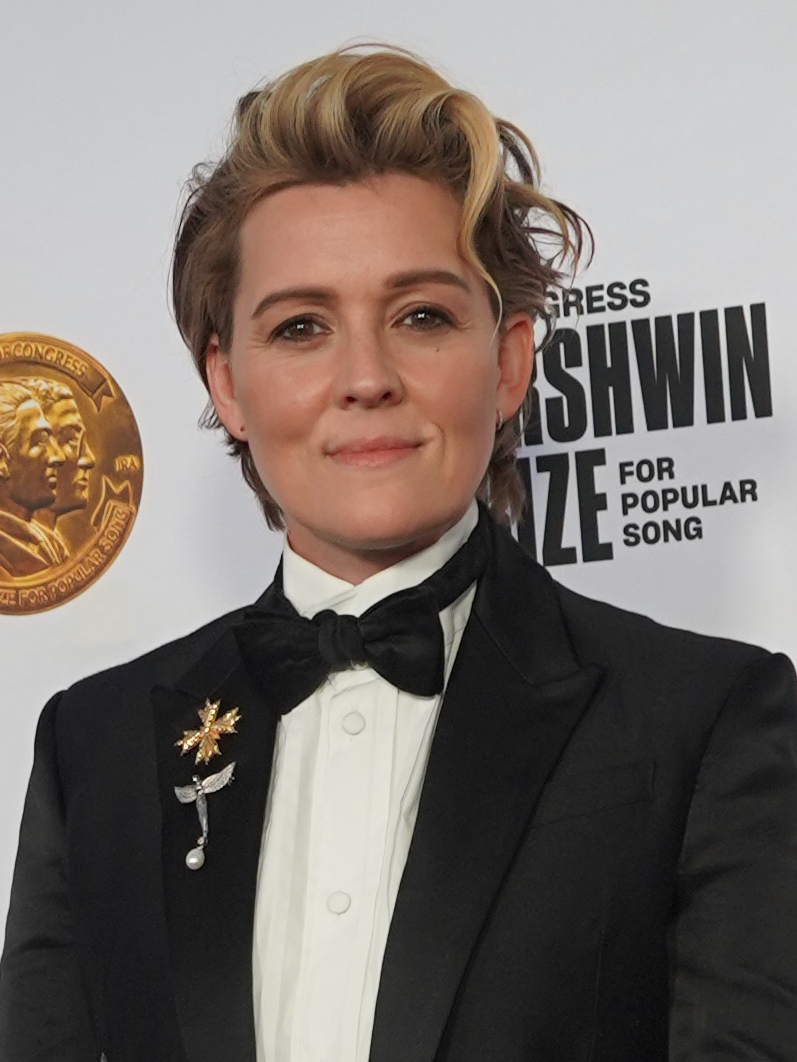
Brandi Carlile (pictured) collaborated with Cyrus on "Thousand Miles".

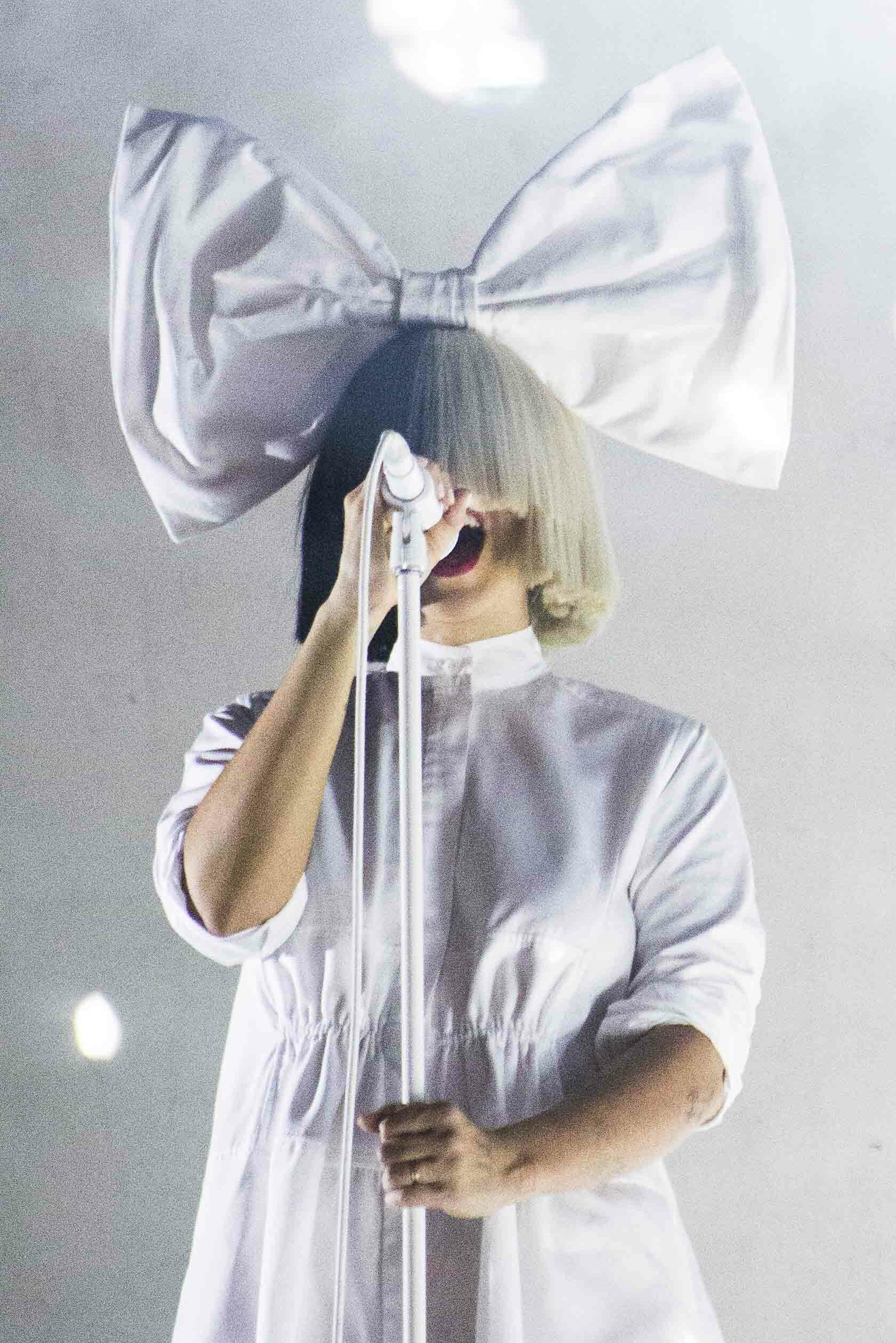
Sia (pictured) collaborated with Cyrus on "Muddy Feet". She also co-wrote "Violet Chemistry".

Name of song, featured performers, writers, originating album, and year released
Song	Performer(s)	Writer(s)	Album	Year	Ref(s).
"1 Sun"	Miley Cyrus	Miley Cyrus ‡	Miley Cyrus & Her Dead Petz	2015	
"23"	Mike Will Made It featuring Miley Cyrus, Wiz Khalifa and Juicy J	Juicy J Wiz Khalifa; Mike Will Made It; Miley Cyrus; Theron Thomas; Timothy Thomas; Pierre Ramon Slaughter	None	2013	
"4x4"	Miley Cyrus featuring Nelly	Nelly; Pharrell Williams; Miley Cyrus	Bangerz	2013	
"7 Things"	Miley Cyrus	Miley Cyrus; Antonina Armato; Tim James	Breakout	2008	
"Adore You"	Miley Cyrus	Stacy Barthe; Oren Yoel	Bangerz	2013	
"Aftermath"	Miley Cyrus	Miley Cyrus; Michael Pollack; Griff Clawson; Jordan Johnson; Stefan Johnson; Maxx Morando	Bass Persuades	2026	
"Am I Dreaming"	Lil Nas X featuring Miley Cyrus	Lil Nas X Miley Cyrus; David Biral; Denzel Baptiste; Omer Fedi; 18yoman William K. Ward	Montero	2021	
"Androgynous" † (originally by The Replacements)	Joan Jett, Miley Cyrus and Laura Jane Grace	Paul Westerberg	Bad Reputation	2018	
"Angels like You"	Miley Cyrus	Miley Cyrus; Ryan Tedder; Ali Tamposi; Andrew Watt; Louis Bell	Plastic Hearts	2020	
"Angels Protect This Home"	Billy Ray Cyrus featuring Miley Cyrus	Billy Ray Cyrus; Miley Cyrus	Thin Line	2016	
"As I Am"	Miley Cyrus	Miley Cyrus; Shelly Peiken; Xandy Barry	Meet Miley Cyrus	2007	
"Ashtrays and Heartbreaks"	Snoop Lion featuring Miley Cyrus	Snoop Lion; Diplo; Ariel Rechtshaid; Andrew Hershey; Angela Hunte	Reincarnated	2013	
"Attention"	Miley Cyrus	Miley Cyrus; Maxx Morando	Attention: Miley Live	2022	
"Bad Karma"	Miley Cyrus featuring Joan Jett	Miley Cyrus; Ilsey Juber	Plastic Hearts	2020	
"Bad Mood"	Miley Cyrus	Miley Cyrus; Oren Yoel	Younger Now	2017	
"Bang Me Box"	Miley Cyrus	Miley Cyrus ‡	Miley Cyrus & Her Dead Petz	2015	
"Bass Persuades"	Miley Cyrus	Miley Cyrus; Gregory Aldae Hein; Kid Harpoon; Michael Pollack	Bass Persuades	2026	
"BB Talk"	Miley Cyrus	Miley Cyrus ‡	Miley Cyrus & Her Dead Petz	2015	
"Beautiful That Way"	Miley Cyrus	Andrew Wyatt; Miley Cyrus; Lykke Li	The Last Showgirl	2024	
"Before the Storm"	Jonas Brothers featuring Miley Cyrus	Nick Jonas; Joe Jonas; Kevin Jonas; Miley Cyrus	Lines, Vines and Trying Times	2009	
"The Bitch Is Back" † (originally by Elton John)	Miley Cyrus	Elton John; Bernie Taupin	Restoration: Reimagining the Songs of Elton John and Bernie Taupin	2018	
"Bottom of the Ocean"	Miley Cyrus	Miley Cyrus; Antonina Armato; Tim James	Breakout	2008	
"Breakout"	Miley Cyrus	Gina Schock; Ted Bruner; Trey Vittetoe	Breakout	2008	
"Butterfly Fly Away" (Note: The extented version of "Butterfly Fly Away" was released on the 2009 Billy Ray Cyrus album Back to Tennessee.)	Miley Cyrus and Billy Ray Cyrus	Glen Ballard; Alan Silvestri	Hannah Montana: The Movie	2009	
"Can't Be Tamed"	Miley Cyrus	Miley Cyrus; Antonina Armato; Tim James; Marek Pompetzki; Paul NZA	Can't Be Tamed	2010	
"Cattitude"	Miley Cyrus featuring RuPaul	Miley Cyrus; Andrew Wyatt; Alma; Ilsey Juber; RuPaul	She Is Coming	2019	
"Christmas Is"	Dolly Parton featuring Miley Cyrus	Dolly Parton	A Holly Dolly Christmas	2020	
"Clear"	Miley Cyrus	Miley Cyrus; Shelly Peiken; Xandy Barry	Meet Miley Cyrus	2007	
"The Climb"	Miley Cyrus	Jessi Alexander; Jon Mabe	Hannah Montana: The Movie	2009	
"Come Get It Bae" #	Pharrell Williams	Pharrell Williams	Girl	2014	
"Crimson and Clover" (Live) † (originally by Tommy James and the Shondells)	Joan Jett featuring Miley Cyrus, Gary Ryan, Dave Grohl and Tommy James	Tommy James; Peter Lucia	The Rock & Roll Hall of Fame: In Concert 2015	2015 (Note: Released in 2018.)	
"Cyrus Skies"	Miley Cyrus	Miley Cyrus; Steven Drozd; Wayne Coyne	Miley Cyrus & Her Dead Petz	2015	
"D.R.E.A.M."	Miley Cyrus featuring Ghostface Killah	Miley Cyrus; John Cunningham; Ilsey Juber; Method Man; Raekwon; David Porter; Ghostface Killah; Isaac Hayes; Inspectah Deck; U-God; RZA; Ol' Dirty Bastard	She Is Coming	2019	
"A Day in the Life" † (originally by The Beatles)	The Flaming Lips featuring Miley Cyrus and New Fumes	John Lennon; Paul McCartney	With a Little Help from My Fwends	2014	
"Decisions"	Borgore featuring Miley Cyrus	Borgore	Newgoreorder	2012	
"Different Religion"	Miley Cyrus featuring Model/Actriz	Miley Cyrus; Aaron Shapiro; Cole Haden; Kid Harpoon; Michael Pollack; Jack Wetmore; Ruben Radlauer	Bass Persuades	2026	
"Do My Thang"	Miley Cyrus	will.i.am Michael McHenry; Ryan Buendia; Kyle Edwards; Jean-Baptiste; Miley Cyrus	Bangerz	2013	
"Doctor (Work It Out)"	Pharrell Williams and Miley Cyrus	Pharrell Williams; Miley Cyrus; Michael Pollack	None	2024	
"Don't Call Me Angel"	Ariana Grande, Miley Cyrus and Lana Del Rey	Ariana Grande; Max Martin; Savan Kotecha; ILYA; Miley Cyrus; Alma; Lana Del Rey	Charlie's Angels: Original Motion Picture Soundtrack	2019	
"Don't Let the Sun Go Down on Me" † (originally by Elton John)	Miley Cyrus	Elton John; Bernie Taupin	Revamp: Reimagining the Songs of Elton John & Bernie Taupin	2018	
"Don't Walk Away"	Miley Cyrus	Miley Cyrus; John Shanks; Hillary Lindsey	Hannah Montana: The Movie	2009	
"Dooo It!"	Miley Cyrus	Miley Cyrus; Wayne Coyne; Steven Drozd; Dennis Coyne	Miley Cyrus & Her Dead Petz	2015	
"Dream" † (originally by Diana DeGarmo as "Dream, Dream, Dream")	Miley Cyrus	John Shanks; Kara DioGuardi	Hannah Montana: The Movie	2009	
"Dream as One"	Miley Cyrus	Miley Cyrus; Mark Ronson; Andrew Wyatt; Simon Franglen	Avatar: Fire and Ash (Original Motion Picture Soundtrack)	2025	
"Drive"	Miley Cyrus	Mike Will Made It; P-Nasty; Samuel Jean; Schmugge; Miley Cyrus	Bangerz	2013	
"The Driveway"	Miley Cyrus	Scott Cutler; Anne Preven; Miley Cyrus	Breakout	2008	
"Earth" #	Lil Dicky	Benny Blanco; Lil Dicky; Jamil Chammas; Ammo; Cashmere Cat	None	2019	
"East Northumberland High"	Miley Cyrus	Antonina Armato; Tim James; Samantha Jo Moore	Meet Miley Cyrus	2007	
"Easy Lover"	Miley Cyrus	Miley Cyrus; Michael Pollack; Omer Fedi; Ryan Tedder	Something Beautiful	2025	
"Edge of Midnight (Midnight Sky Remix)" (mashup of "Midnight Sky" and "Edge of Seventeen")	Miley Cyrus featuring Stevie Nicks	Miley Cyrus; Stevie Nicks; Ali Tamposi; Ilsey Juber; Jon Bellion; Andrew Watt; Louis Bell	Plastic Hearts	2020	
"End of the World"	Miley Cyrus	Miley Cyrus; Alec O'Hanley; Gregory Aldae Hein; Jonathan Rado; Michael Pollack; Molly Rankin; Shawn Everett	Something Beautiful	2025	
"Every Girl You've Ever Loved"	Miley Cyrus featuring Naomi Campbell	Miley Cyrus; Alec O'Hanley; David Dewaele; Jonathan Rado; Marie Davidson; Michael Pollack; Molly Rankin; Pierre Guerineau; Shawn Everett; Stephen Dewaele	Something Beautiful	2025	
"Every Rose Has Its Thorn" † (originally by Poison)	Miley Cyrus	Bret Michaels; Rikki Rockett; Bobby Dall; C.C. DeVille	Can't Be Tamed	2010	
"Everybody Hurts" † (originally by R.E.M.)	Helping Haiti (Note: Leona Lewis, Rod Stewart, Mariah Carey, Cheryl, Mika, Michael Bublé, Joe McElderry, Miley Cyrus, James Blunt, Gary Barlow, Mark Owen, Jon Bon Jovi, James Morrison, Alexandra Burke, Jason Orange, Susan Boyle, JLS, Shane Filan, Mark Feehily, Kylie Minogue, Robbie Williams, Kian Egan and Nicky Byrne.)	Bill Berry; Peter Buck; Mike Mills; Michael Stipe	None	2010	
"Evil Is but a Shadow"	Miley Cyrus	Miley Cyrus; Wayne Coyne; Steven Drozd; Derek Brown; Dennis Coyne	Miley Cyrus & Her Dead Petz	2015	
"Fall Down"	will.i.am featuring Miley Cyrus	will.i.am Dr. Luke; Benny Blanco; Cirkut	#willpower	2013	
"Feelin' Myself"	will.i.am featuring Miley Cyrus, French Montana, Wiz Khalifa and DJ Mustard	will.i.am Jean-Baptiste; Mustard; French Montana; Mike Free; Wiz Khalifa	#willpower	2013	
"Flowers"	Miley Cyrus	Miley Cyrus; Gregory Aldae Hein; Michael Pollack	Endless Summer Vacation	2023	
"The Floyd Song (Sunrise)"	Miley Cyrus	Miley Cyrus; Steven Drozd; Wayne Coyne; Dennis Coyne	Miley Cyrus & Her Dead Petz	2015	
"Fly on the Wall"	Miley Cyrus	Miley Cyrus; Antonina Armato; Tim James; Devrim Karaoğlu	Breakout	2008	
"Forgiveness and Love"	Miley Cyrus	Miley Cyrus; Antonina Armato; Tim James; Adam Schmalholz	Can't Be Tamed	2010	
"FU"	Miley Cyrus featuring French Montana	French Montana; Rami Samir Afuni; Mozella; Miley Cyrus	Bangerz	2013	
"Fuckin Fucked Up"	Miley Cyrus	Miley Cyrus; Dennis Coyne	Miley Cyrus & Her Dead Petz	2015	
"Full Circle"	Miley Cyrus	Scott Cutler; Anne Preven; Miley Cyrus	Breakout	2008	
"Fweaky"	Miley Cyrus	Miley Cyrus ‡	Miley Cyrus & Her Dead Petz	2015	
"G.N.O. (Girl's Night Out)"	Miley Cyrus	Miley Cyrus; Matthew Wilder; Tamara Dunn	Meet Miley Cyrus	2007	
"#GETITRIGHT"	Miley Cyrus	Pharrell Williams	Bangerz	2013	
"Gimme What I Want"	Miley Cyrus	Miley Cyrus; Majid Al Maskati; Ali Tamposi; Andrew Watt; Louis Bell	Plastic Hearts	2020	
"Girls Just Wanna Have Fun" † (originally by Cyndi Lauper)	Miley Cyrus	Robert Hazard	Breakout	2008	
"Give Me Love"	Miley Cyrus	Miley Cyrus; Kid Harpoon; Tyler Johnson	Something Beautiful	2025	
"Golden Burning Sun"	Miley Cyrus	Miley Cyrus; Bibi Bourelly; Jonathan Rado; Michael Pollack; Shawn Everett; Tobias Jesso Jr.	Something Beautiful	2025	
"Golden G String"	Miley Cyrus	Miley Cyrus; Andrew Watt	Plastic Hearts	2020	
"Good and Broken"	Miley Cyrus	Miley Cyrus; Antonina Armato; Tim James	Meet Miley Cyrus	2007	
"Goodbye"	Miley Cyrus	Miley Cyrus; Antonina Armato; Tim James	Breakout	2008	
"Hands in the Air"	Miley Cyrus featuring Ludacris	Ludacris; Mike Will Made It; P-Nasty; Samuel Jean; Asia Bryant; Miley Cyrus	Bangerz (deluxe version)	2013	
"Hands of Love"	Miley Cyrus	Linda Perry	None	2015	
"Handstand"	Miley Cyrus	Miley Cyrus; Harmony Korine; Maxx Morando	Endless Summer Vacation	2023	
"Happy Xmas (War Is Over)" † (originally by Plastic Ono Band)	Miley Cyrus and Mark Ronson featuring Sean Ono Lennon	John Lennon; Yoko Ono	None	2018	
"Hate Me"	Miley Cyrus	Miley Cyrus; Ali Tamposi; Andrew Watt; Louis Bell	Plastic Hearts	2020	
"Heart of Glass" (Live) † (originally by Blondie)	Miley Cyrus	Debbie Harry; Chris Stein	Plastic Hearts	2020	
"High"	Miley Cyrus	Miley Cyrus; Jennifer Decilveo; Caitlyn Smith	Plastic Hearts	2020	
"Hoedown Throwdown"	Miley Cyrus	Adam Anders; Nikki Hassman	Hannah Montana: The Movie	2009	
"Hovering"	Miley Cyrus	Antonina Armato; Tim James	Breakout (platinum edition)	2008	
"I Forgive Yiew"	Miley Cyrus	Miley Cyrus; Sam Hook	Miley Cyrus & Her Dead Petz	2015	
"I Get So Scared"	Miley Cyrus	Miley Cyrus ‡	Miley Cyrus & Her Dead Petz	2015	
"I Got So High That I Saw Jesus" (Live) † (originally by Noah Cyrus)	Noah Cyrus featuring Miley Cyrus	Noah Cyrus; PJ Harding	None	2020	
"I Hope You Find It"	Miley Cyrus	Jeffrey Steele; Steven Robson	The Last Song	2010	
"II Most Wanted"	Beyoncé and Miley Cyrus	Beyoncé; Miley Cyrus; Ryan Tedder; Michael Pollack	Cowboy Carter	2024	
"I Learned from You"	Miley Cyrus and Billy Ray Cyrus	Matthew Gerrard; Steve Diamond	Hannah Montana	2006	
"I Miss You"	Miley Cyrus	Miley Cyrus; Brian Green; Wendi Foy Green	Meet Miley Cyrus	2007	
"I Thought I Lost You"	Miley Cyrus and John Travolta	Miley Cyrus; Jeffrey Steele	Bolt	2008	
"I Would Die for You"	Miley Cyrus	Miley Cyrus; Oren Yoel	Younger Now	2017	
"I'm So Drunk"	Miley Cyrus	Miley Cyrus ‡	Miley Cyrus & Her Dead Petz	2015	
"Innocent Ways"	Miley Cyrus	Miley Cyrus; Maxx Morando	Bass Persuades	2026	
"Inspired"	Miley Cyrus	Miley Cyrus; Oren Yoel	Younger Now	2017	
"Interlude 1"	Miley Cyrus	Miley Cyrus; Jonathan Rado; Max Taylor-Sheppard; Maxx Morando; Michael Pollack; Shawn Everett	Something Beautiful	2025	
"Interlude 2"	Miley Cyrus	Miley Cyrus; Jonathan Rado; Maxx Morando; Michael Pollack; Shawn Everett	Something Beautiful	2025	
"Island"	Miley Cyrus	Miley Cyrus; BJ Burton; Jennifer Decilveo; Caitlyn Smith; Michael Pollack; Dani Miller	Endless Summer Vacation	2023	
"Jaded"	Miley Cyrus	Miley Cyrus; Greg Kurstin; Sarah Aarons	Endless Summer Vacation	2023	
"Jolene" (Live) † (originally by Dolly Parton)	Miley Cyrus	Dolly Parton	Attention: Miley Live	2022	
"Just Stand Up!"	Artists Stand Up to Cancer (Note: Beyoncé, Carrie Underwood, Rihanna, Miley Cyrus, Sheryl Crow, Fergie, Leona Lewis, Keyshia Cole, Natasha Bedingfield, LeAnn Rimes, Melissa Etheridge, Mary J. Blige, Ciara, Mariah Carey and Ashanti.)	Babyface; Ronnie Walton	None	2008	
"Karen Don't Be Sad"	Miley Cyrus	Miley Cyrus; Wayne Coyne; The Aristocrats; Steven Drozd	Miley Cyrus & Her Dead Petz	2015	
"Kicking and Screaming" † (originally by Ashlee Simpson)	Miley Cyrus	John Shanks; Kara DioGuardi	The Time of Our Lives	2009	
"Know This"	Braison Cyrus featuring Miley Cyrus	Braison Cyrus; Jordan Lindley	None	2025	
"Let's Dance"	Miley Cyrus	Miley Cyrus; Antonina Armato; Tim James	Meet Miley Cyrus	2007	
"Let's Get Married"	Miley Cyrus	Miley Cyrus; Michael Pollack; Jordan Johnson; Stefan Johnson; Gregory Aldae Hein	Bass Persuades	2026	
"Liberty Walk"	Miley Cyrus	Miley Cyrus; Antonina Armato; Tim James; Nicholas J. Scapa; John Read Fasse; Michael McGinnis	Can't Be Tamed	2010	
"Light of a Clear Blue Morning" † (originally by Dolly Parton)	Dolly Parton featuring Lainey Wilson, Miley Cyrus, Queen Latifah and Reba McEntire	Dolly Parton	None	2026	
"Lighter"	Miley Cyrus	Miley Cyrus ‡	Miley Cyrus & Her Dead Petz	2015	
"Like a Prayer" (Live) † (originally by Madonna)	Miley Cyrus	Madonna; Patrick Leonard	Attention: Miley Live	2022	
"Lockdown"	Miley Cyrus featuring David Byrne	Miley Cyrus; David Byrne; Jonathan Rado; Maxx Morando; Max Taylor-Sheppard; Shawn Everett; Pino Palladino; Michael Pollack; Aldae	Something Beautiful (deluxe version)	2025	
"Love Money Party"	Miley Cyrus featuring Big Sean	Big Sean; Mike Will Made It; Marquel Middlebrooks; Future; Sean Garrett; Miley Cyrus	Bangerz	2013	
"Love Someone"	Miley Cyrus	Miley Cyrus; Oren Yoel	Younger Now	2017	
"Lucy in the Sky with Diamonds" † (originally by The Beatles)	The Flaming Lips featuring Miley Cyrus and Moby	John Lennon; Paul McCartney	With a Little Help from My Fwends	2014	
"Malibu"	Miley Cyrus	Miley Cyrus; Oren Yoel	Younger Now	2017	
"Maybe You're Right"	Miley Cyrus	Mike Will Made It; P-Nasty; Cam; John Shanks; Tyler Johnson; Miley Cyrus	Bangerz	2013	
"Maybe" (Live) † (originally by The Chantels)	Miley Cyrus	Richie Barrett	Attention: Miley Live	2022	
"Midnight Sky"	Miley Cyrus	Miley Cyrus; Ilsey Juber; Jon Bellion; Ali Tamposi; Andrew Watt; Louis Bell	Plastic Hearts	2020	
"Miley Tibetan Bowlzzz"	Miley Cyrus	Miley Cyrus; Steven Drozd	Miley Cyrus & Her Dead Petz	2015	
"Milky Milky Milk"	Miley Cyrus	Miley Cyrus; Wayne Coyne; Steven Drozd; Dennis Coyne	Miley Cyrus & Her Dead Petz	2015	
"Miss You So Much"	Miley Cyrus	Miley Cyrus; Oren Yoel	Younger Now	2017	
"More to Lose"	Miley Cyrus	Miley Cyrus; Autumn Rowe; Michael Pollack	Something Beautiful	2025	
"The Most"	Miley Cyrus	Miley Cyrus; Ilsey Juber; Mark Ronson; Jonny Price; Marcus "MarcLo" Lomax; Stefan Johnson; BJ Burton	She Is Coming	2019	
"Mother's Daughter"	Miley Cyrus	Miley Cyrus; Andrew Wyatt; Alma	She Is Coming	2019	
"Muddy Feet"	Miley Cyrus featuring Sia	Miley Cyrus; Michael Pollack; Mike Will Made It; Bibi Bourelly; Gregory Aldae Hein; Jesse Shatkin; Sia; Jesse van der Meulen; David Frank; Steve Kipner; Pam Sheyne	Endless Summer Vacation	2023	
"My Darlin'"	Miley Cyrus featuring Future	Future; Mike Will Made It; P-Nasty; Jeremih; Jerry Leiber; Mike Stoller; Ben E. King; Miley Cyrus	Bangerz	2013	
"My Heart Beats for Love"	Miley Cyrus	Miley Cyrus; John Shanks; Hillary Lindsey; Gordie Sampson	Can't Be Tamed	2010	
"Neon Signs"	Miley Cyrus featuring Andrew Wyatt of Miike Snow	Miley Cyrus; Kid Harpoon; Michael Pollack	Bass Persuades	2026	
"Never Be Me"	Miley Cyrus	Miley Cyrus; Ilsey Juber; Mark Ronson	Plastic Hearts	2020	
"Night Crawling"	Miley Cyrus featuring Billy Idol	Miley Cyrus; Billy Idol; Ryan Tedder; Michael Pollack; Ali Tamposi; Andrew Watt; Louis Bell; Happy Perez; Taylor Hawkins	Plastic Hearts	2020	
"Nothing Breaks Like a Heart"	Mark Ronson featuring Miley Cyrus	Mark Ronson; Miley Cyrus; Ilsey Juber; Thomas Brenneck; Maxime Picard; Clément Picard; Conor Rayne	Late Night Feelings	2018	
"Nothing Else Matters" † (originally by Metallica)	Miley Cyrus featuring Watt, Elton John, Yo-Yo Ma, Robert Trujillo and Chad Smith	James Hetfield; Lars Ulrich	The Metallica Blacklist	2021	
"Nothing to Lose"	Bret Michaels featuring Miley Cyrus	Bret Michaels	Custom Built	2010	
"Obsessed"	Miley Cyrus	Roger Lavoie	The Time of Our Lives	2009	
"On a Roll" † (originally by Nine Inch Nails as "Head Like a Hole")	Ashley O	Miley Cyrus; Charlie Brooker; Trent Reznor	None	2019	
"On My Own"	Miley Cyrus	Pharrell Williams	Bangerz (deluxe version)	2013	
"Orbit"	Miley Cyrus	Miley Cyrus; Michael Pollack; Jordan Johnson; Stefan Johnson	Bass Persuades	2026	
"Overbroad" (Live) † (originally by Justin Bieber)	Justin Bieber featuring Miley Cyrus	Bruce Waynne; Dirty Swift; Dapo Torimiro; Adonis Shropshire; Justin Bieber	Never Say Never: The Remixes	2011	
"Pablow the Blowfish"	Miley Cyrus	Miley Cyrus ‡	Miley Cyrus & Her Dead Petz	2015	
"Part of Your World" † (originally by Jodi Benson)	Miley Cyrus	Alan Menken; Howard Ashman	Disneymania 5	2007	
"Party in the U.S.A."	Miley Cyrus	Dr. Luke; Claude Kelly; Jessie J	The Time of Our Lives	2009	
"Party Up the Street"	Miley Cyrus featuring Swae Lee and Mike Will Made It	Miley Cyrus; Andrew Wyatt; Swae Lee; Pluss; Mike Will Made It	She Is Coming	2019	
"Permanent December"	Miley Cyrus	Miley Cyrus; John Shanks; Claude Kelly	Can't Be Tamed	2010	
"Plastic Hearts"	Miley Cyrus	Miley Cyrus; Ryan Tedder; Ali Tamposi; Andrew Watt; Louis Bell	Plastic Hearts	2020	
"Prelude"	Miley Cyrus	Miley Cyrus; Cole Haden; Jonathan Rado; Maxx Morando; Michael Pollack; Shawn Everett	Something Beautiful	2025	
"Pretend You're God"	Miley Cyrus	Miley Cyrus; Andrew Wyatt; Emile Haynie; Gregory Aldae Hein; Jonathan Rado; Maxx Morando; Michael Pollack; Shawn Everett	Something Beautiful	2025	
"Prisoner"	Miley Cyrus featuring Dua Lipa	Miley Cyrus; Dua Lipa; Ali Tamposi; Michael Pollack; Andrew Watt; Jordan K. Johnson; Stefan Johnson; Marcus "MarcLo" Lomax; Jon Bellion	Plastic Hearts	2020	
"Psycho Killer" † (originally by Talking Heads)	Miley Cyrus	David Byrne; Chris Frantz; Tina Weymouth	Everyone's Getting Involved: A Tribute to Talking Heads' Stop Making Sense	2024	
"Rainbowland"	Miley Cyrus featuring Dolly Parton	Miley Cyrus; Oren Yoel; Dolly Parton	Younger Now	2017	
"Ready, Set, Don't Go"	Billy Ray Cyrus featuring Miley Cyrus	Billy Ray Cyrus; Casey Beathard	Home at Last	2007	
"Real and True"	Future and Miley Cyrus featuring Mr Hudson	Future; Miley Cyrus; Mr Hudson	None	2013	
"Reborn"	Miley Cyrus	Miley Cyrus; Ethan Shevin; Gregory Aldae Hein; Ian Gold; Jonathan Rado; Max Taylor-Sheppard; Maxx Morando; Michael Pollack; Shawn Everett	Something Beautiful	2025	
"Redlights"	Miley Cyrus	Miley Cyrus; Michael Pollack	Bass Persuades	2026	
"Right Here"	Miley Cyrus	Miley Cyrus; Antonina Armato; Tim James	Meet Miley Cyrus	2007	
"Right Where I Belong" † (originally by Nine Inch Nails as "Right Where It Belongs")	Ashley O	Trent Reznor	None	2019	
"River"	Miley Cyrus	Miley Cyrus; Justin Tranter; Kid Harpoon; Tyler Johnson	Endless Summer Vacation	2023	
"Robot"	Miley Cyrus	Miley Cyrus; John Shanks	Can't Be Tamed	2010	
"Rockin' Around the Christmas Tree" † (originally by Brenda Lee)	Miley Cyrus	Johnny Marks	Spotify Singles – Holiday	2017	
"Rooting for My Baby"	Miley Cyrus	Pharrell Williams; Miley Cyrus	Bangerz (deluxe version)	2013	
"Rose Colored Lenses"	Miley Cyrus	Miley Cyrus; Kid Harpoon; Tyler Johnson	Endless Summer Vacation	2023	
"Santa Claus Is Comin' to Town" † (originally by Harry Reser)	Miley Cyrus	John Frederick Coots; Haven Gillespie	All Wrapped Up	2008	
"Scars"	Miley Cyrus	Miley Cyrus; John Shanks	Can't Be Tamed	2010	
"Secrets"	Miley Cyrus featuring Lindsey Buckingham and Mick Fleetwood	Miley Cyrus; Kid Harpoon; Tyler Johnson; Jonathan Rado; Michael Pollack; Shawn Everett	Something Beautiful (deluxe version)	2025	
"See You Again"	Miley Cyrus	Miley Cyrus; Antonina Armato; Tim James	Meet Miley Cyrus	2007	
"Send It On"	Disney's Friends for Change (Note: Demi Lovato, Jonas Brothers, Miley Cyrus and Selena Gomez.)	Adam Anders; Nikki Hassman; Peer Åström	None	2009	
"She's Not Him"	Miley Cyrus	Miley Cyrus; Oren Yoel	Younger Now	2017	
"Simple Song" † (originally by Jeffrey Steele)	Miley Cyrus	Jeffrey Steele; Jesse Littleton	Breakout	2008	
"Slab of Butter (Scorpion)"	Miley Cyrus featuring Sarah Barthel	Miley Cyrus; Wayne Coyne; Steven Drozd; Dennis Coyne	Miley Cyrus & Her Dead Petz	2015	
"Sleigh Ride" † (originally by Leroy Anderson)	Miley Cyrus	Leroy Anderson; Mitchell Parish	Spotify Singles – Holiday	2017	
"Slide Away"	Miley Cyrus	Miley Cyrus; Alma; Andrew Wyatt; Mike Will Made It	She Is Coming (digital re-issue)	2019	
"Smile"	Miley Cyrus	Miley Cyrus; Gregory Aldae Hein; Kid Harpoon; Michael Pollack	Bass Persuades (exclusive edition)	2026	
"SMS (Bangerz)"	Miley Cyrus featuring Britney Spears	Mike Will Made It; Marquel Middlebrooks; Sean Garrett; Miley Cyrus	Bangerz	2013	
"Snow"	Miley Cyrus	Miley Cyrus; Kid Harpoon; Michael Pollack; Gregory Aldae Hein; Cole Haden; Jack Wetmore; Aaron Shapiro; Ruben Radlauer	Bass Persuades	2026	
"Someday"	Miley Cyrus	Miley Cyrus; Antonina Armato; Tim James; Devrim Karaoğlu	Breakout (platinum edition)	2008	
"Someone Else"	Miley Cyrus	Mike Will Made It; P-Nasty; Timothy Thomas; Theron Thomas; Mozella; Miley Cyrus	Bangerz	2013	
"Something About Space Dude"	Miley Cyrus	Miley Cyrus; Wayne Coyne; Derek Brown; Steven Drozd; Dennis Coyne	Miley Cyrus & Her Dead Petz	2015	
"Something Beautiful"	Miley Cyrus	Miley Cyrus; Max Taylor-Sheppard; Maxx Morando; Michael Pollack; Ryan Beatty	Something Beautiful	2025	
"Space Bootz"	Miley Cyrus	Miley Cyrus ‡	Miley Cyrus & Her Dead Petz	2015	
"Stand"	Billy Ray Cyrus featuring Miley Cyrus	Billy Ray Cyrus; Andy Dodd; Adam Watts	Wanna Be Your Joe	2006	
"Start All Over"	Miley Cyrus	Scott Cutler; Anne Preven; Fefe Dobson	Meet Miley Cyrus	2007	
"Stay"	Miley Cyrus	Miley Cyrus; John Shanks	Can't Be Tamed	2010	
"Summertime Sadness" (Live) † (originally by Lana Del Rey)	Miley Cyrus	Lana Del Rey; Rick Nowels	BBC Radio 1's Live Lounge: The Collection	2013 (Note: Released in 2019.)	
"Take Me Along"	Miley Cyrus	Miley Cyrus; John Shanks	Can't Be Tamed	2010	
"Talk Is Cheap"	Miley Cyrus	John Shanks; Amy Lindop	The Time of Our Lives	2009	
"Tangerine"	Miley Cyrus featuring Big Sean	Miley Cyrus; Steven Drozd; Wayne Coyne; Dennis Coyne; Big Sean	Miley Cyrus & Her Dead Petz	2015	
"Teardrop"	Lolawolf featuring Miley Cyrus	Zoë Kravitz; Miley Cyrus; Jimmy Giannopoulos; James Levy	None	2016	
"These Four Walls" † (originally by Cheyenne Kimball as "Four Walls")	Miley Cyrus	Scott Cutler; Anne Preven; Cheyenne Kimball	Breakout	2008	
"Thinkin'"	Miley Cyrus	Miley Cyrus; Oren Yoel	Younger Now	2017	
"Thousand Miles"	Miley Cyrus featuring Brandi Carlile	Miley Cyrus; Tobias Jesso Jr. Bibi Bourelly; Mike Will Made It	Endless Summer Vacation	2023	
"The Thrill Is Gone / Django" † (originally by Everett Marshall / Modern Jazz Quartet)	Jeff Goldblum & The Mildred Snitzer Orchestra featuring Miley Cyrus	John Lewis; Lew Brown; Ray Henderson	I Shouldn't Be Telling You This	2019	
"Thrillbilly" (Live) † (originally by Billy Ray Cyrus)	Billy Ray Cyrus featuring Miley Cyrus	J.R. Shelby; Marty Dodson; Danny Orton	iTunes Live from London	2009	
"Tiger Dreams"	Miley Cyrus featuring Ariel Pink	Miley Cyrus; Steven Drozd; Wayne Coyne	Miley Cyrus & Her Dead Petz	2015	
"The Time of Our Lives"	Miley Cyrus	Dr. Luke; Claude Kelly; Kesha; Pebe Sebert	The Time of Our Lives	2009	
"Twinkle Song"	Miley Cyrus	Miley Cyrus ‡	Miley Cyrus & Her Dead Petz	2015	
"Two More Lonely People"	Miley Cyrus	Miley Cyrus; Kevin Kadish; Brandon Jane; Angie Aparo; Antonina Armato	Can't Be Tamed	2010	
"Unholy"	Miley Cyrus	Miley Cyrus; Andrew Wyatt; Ilsey Juber; Jasper Sheff; John Cunningham	She Is Coming	2019	
"Used to Be Young"	Miley Cyrus	Gregory Aldae Hein; Michael Pollack; Miley Cyrus	Endless Summer Vacation (digital reissue)	2023	
"Violet Chemistry"	Miley Cyrus	Miley Cyrus; Mike Will Made It; Jesse Shatkin; James Blake; Sia	Endless Summer Vacation	2023	
"Wake Up America"	Miley Cyrus	Miley Cyrus; Antonina Armato; Tim James; Aaron Dudley	Breakout	2008	
"Walk of Fame"	Miley Cyrus featuring Brittany Howard	Miley Cyrus; Brittany Howard; Jonathan Rado; Maxx Morando; Michael Pollack; Shawn Everett	Something Beautiful	2025	
"We a Famly"	The Flaming Lips featuring Miley Cyrus and New Fumes	The Flaming Lips	Oczy Mlody	2017	
"We Are the World 25 for Haiti" † (originally by USA for Africa as "We Are the World")	Artists for Haiti (Note: Justin Bieber, Nicole Scherzinger, Jennifer Hudson, Jennifer Nettles, Josh Groban, Tony Bennett, Mary J. Blige, Toni Braxton, Michael Jackson, Janet Jackson, Barbra Streisand, Miley Cyrus, Enrique Iglesias, Jamie Foxx, Wyclef Jean, Adam Levine, Pink, BeBe Winans, Usher, Celine Dion, Orianthi, Fergie, Nick Jonas, Mary Mary, T.I., Isaac Slade, Carlos Santana, Lil Wayne, Akon, T-Pain, LL Cool J, will.i.am, Snoop Dogg, Nipsey Hussle, Busta Rhymes, Swizz Beatz, Kid Cudi, Iyaz, Mann and Kanye West.)	Michael Jackson; Lionel Richie	None	2010	
"We Belong to the Music"	Timbaland featuring Miley Cyrus	Timbaland; J-Roc; Jim Beanz; Walter Milsap; Candice Nelson	Shock Value II	2009	
"We Can't Stop"	Miley Cyrus	Mike Will Made It; P-Nasty; Timothy Thomas; Theron Thomas; Miley Cyrus; Doug E. Fresh; Slick Rick	Bangerz	2013	
"Week Without You"	Miley Cyrus	Miley Cyrus; Oren Yoel	Younger Now	2017	
"When I Look at You"	Miley Cyrus	John Shanks; Hillary Lindsey	The Time of Our Lives	2009	
"Who Owns My Heart"	Miley Cyrus	Miley Cyrus; Antonina Armato; Tim James; Devrim Karaoğlu	Can't Be Tamed	2010	
"Wildcard"	Miley Cyrus	Miley Cyrus; Kid Harpoon; Tyler Johnson; Tobias Jesso Jr.	Endless Summer Vacation	2023	
"Wildflowers" † (originally by Tom Petty)	Miley Cyrus	Tom Petty	Spotify Singles	2017	
"Without You" (Remix)	The Kid Laroi and Miley Cyrus	Billy Walsh; Blake Slatkin; The Kid Laroi; Miley Cyrus; Omer Fedi	None	2021	
"Wonder Woman"	Miley Cyrus	Miley Cyrus; Michael Pollack; Gregory Aldae Hein; Kid Harpoon; Tyler Johnson	Endless Summer Vacation	2023	
"Wrecking Ball"	Miley Cyrus	Dr. Luke; Mozella; Stephan Moccio; Sacha Skarbek; Cirkut	Bangerz	2013	
"Wrecking Ball" (re-recording)	Dolly Parton featuring Miley Cyrus	Dr. Luke; Mozella; Stephan Moccio; Sacha Skarbek; Cirkut	Rockstar	2023	
"WTF Do I Know"	Miley Cyrus	Miley Cyrus; Ryan Tedder; Ali Tamposi; Andrew Watt; Louis Bell	Plastic Hearts	2020	
"You"	Miley Cyrus	Miley Cyrus; Bibi Bourelly; Michael Pollack; Ian Kirkpatrick	Endless Summer Vacation	2023	
"You're Gonna Make Me Lonesome When You Go" † (originally by Bob Dylan)	Miley Cyrus	Bob Dylan	Chimes of Freedom	2012	
"Younger Now"	Miley Cyrus	Miley Cyrus; Oren Yoel	Younger Now	2017	
"Younger You"	Miley Cyrus	Gregory Aldae Hein; Jon Bellion; Jordan K. Johnson; Michael Pollack; Miley Cyrus; Stefan Johnson	None	2026	
"Zip-a-Dee-Doo-Dah" † (originally by James Baskett)	Miley Cyrus	Allie Wrubel; Ray Gilbert	Disneymania 4	2006	
"Zombie" (Live) † (originally by The Cranberries)	Miley Cyrus	Dolores O'Riordan	Plastic Hearts	2020	

== Songs released as Hannah Montana ==
Key
†	Indicates songs covered by Hannah Montana

Name of song, featured performers, writers, originating album, and year released
Song	Performer(s)	Writer(s)	Album	Year	Ref(s).
"Are You Ready"	Hannah Montana	Toby Gad; BC Jean; Lyrica Anderson	Hannah Montana Forever	2010	
"Barefoot Cinderella"	Hannah Montana	Jamie Houston; James Dean Hicks	Hannah Montana Forever	2010	
"Been Here All Along"	Hannah Montana	Jennie Lurie; Aris Archontis; Chen Neeman	Hannah Montana Forever	2010	
"The Best of Both Worlds"	Hannah Montana	Matthew Gerrard; Robbie Nevil	Hannah Montana	2006	
"The Best of Both Worlds" (The 2009 Movie Mix; re-recording)	Hannah Montana	Matthew Gerrard; Robbie Nevil	Hannah Montana	2009	
"Bigger than Us"	Hannah Montana	Antonina Armato; Tim James	Hannah Montana 2	2007	
"Don't Wanna Be Torn"	Hannah Montana	Kara DioGuardi; Mitch Allan	Hannah Montana 3	2009	
"Every Part of Me"	Hannah Montana	Adam Watts; Andy Dodd	Hannah Montana 3	2009	
"Gonna Get This"	Hannah Montana featuring Iyaz	Niclas Molinder; Joacim Persson; Johan Alkenäs; Drew Ryan Scott	Hannah Montana Forever	2010	
"The Good Life"	Hannah Montana	Matthew Gerrard; Bridget Benenate	Hannah Montana: The Movie	2009	
"He Could Be the One"	Hannah Montana	Kara DioGuardi; Mitch Allan	Hannah Montana 3	2009	
"I Got Nerve"	Hannah Montana	Jeannie Lurie; Ken Hauptman; Aruna	Hannah Montana	2006	
"I Wanna Know You" (duet version)	Hannah Montana featuring David Archuleta	Chen Neeman; Jeannie Lurie; Aris Archontis	Hannah Montana 3	2009	
"I Wanna Know You" (solo version)	Hannah Montana	Chen Neeman; Jeannie Lurie; Aris Archontis	Hannah Montana 3	2009	
"I'll Always Remember You"	Hannah Montana	Mitch Allan; Jessi Alexander	Hannah Montana Forever	2010	
"I'm Still Good"	Hannah Montana	Jennie Lurie; Aris Archontis; Chen Neeman	Hannah Montana Forever	2010	
"Ice Cream Freeze (Let's Chill)"	Hannah Montana	Matthew Gerrard; Robbie Nevil	Hannah Montana 3	2009	
"If We Were a Movie" (solo version)	Hannah Montana	Jeannie Lurie; Holly Mathis	Hannah Montana	2006	
"If We Were a Movie" (duet version)	Hannah Montana and Corbin Bleu	Jeannie Lurie; Holly Mathis	Hannah Montana 3	2009	
"It's All Right Here"	Hannah Montana	Antonina Armato; Tim James	Hannah Montana 3	2009	
"Just a Girl"	Hannah Montana	Toby Gad; Arama Brown	Hannah Montana 3	2009	
"Just Like You"	Hannah Montana	Adam Watts; Andy Dodd	Hannah Montana	2006	
"Kiss It Goodbye"	Hannah Montana	Niclas Molinder; Joacim Persson; Jakob Hazell; Charlie Masson; Christoffer Wikberg	Hannah Montana Forever	2010	
"Let's Do This"	Hannah Montana	Derek George; Tim Owens; Adam Tefteller; Ali Theodore	Hannah Montana: The Movie	2009	
"Let's Get Crazy"	Hannah Montana	Vitamin C Michael Kotch; Dave Derby; Michael "Smidi" Smith; Stefanie Ridel; Mim Nervo; Liv Nervo	Hannah Montana: The Movie	2009	
"Life's What You Make It"	Hannah Montana	Matthew Gerrard; Robbie Nevil	Hannah Montana 2	2007	
"Love That Lets Go"	Hannah Montana featuring Billy Ray Cyrus	Adam Anders; Nikki Hassman	Hannah Montana Forever	2010	
"Make Some Noise"	Hannah Montana	Andy Dodd; Adam Watts	Hannah Montana 2	2007	
"Mixed Up"	Hannah Montana	Kara DioGuardi; Marti Frederiksen	Hannah Montana 3	2009	
"Need a Little Love"	Hannah Montana featuring Sheryl Crow	Jamie Houston	Hannah Montana Forever	2010	
"Nobody's Perfect"	Hannah Montana	Matthew Gerrard; Robbie Nevil	Hannah Montana (special edition)	2007	
"Old Blue Jeans"	Hannah Montana	Michael Bradford; Pam Sheyne	Hannah Montana 2	2007	
"One in a Million" (originally by Sandy Mölling)	Hannah Montana	Toby Gad; Negin Djafari	Hannah Montana 2	2007	
"One in a Million" (acoustic version; originally by Sandy Mölling)	Hannah Montana	Toby Gad; Negin Djafari	Hannah Montana 2	2007	
"Ordinary Girl"	Hannah Montana	Toby Gad; Arama Brown	Hannah Montana Forever	2010	
"The Other Side of Me"	Hannah Montana	Matthew Gerrard; Robbie Nevil	Hannah Montana	2006	
"Pumpin' Up the Party"	Hannah Montana	Matthew Gerrard; Jamie Houston	Hannah Montana	2006	
"Que Sera"	Hannah Montana	Toby Gad; BC Jean; Denise Eisenberg Rich; Ray Evans; Jay Livingston	Hannah Montana Forever	2010	
"Rock Star"	Hannah Montana	Aris Archontis; Jeannie Lurie; Chen Neeman	Hannah Montana 2	2007	
"Rockin' Around the Christmas Tree" † (originally by Brenda Lee)	Hannah Montana	Johnny Marks	Hannah Montana	2006	
"Spotlight"	Hannah Montana	Scott Cutler; Anne Preven	Hannah Montana: The Movie	2009	
"Supergirl"	Hannah Montana	Daniel James; Kara DioGuardi	Hannah Montana 3	2009	
"This Is the Life"	Hannah Montana	Jeannie Lurie; Shari Short	Hannah Montana	2006	
"True Friend"	Hannah Montana	Jeannie Lurie; Jeannie Lurie	Hannah Montana 2	2007	
"We Got the Party" (duet version)	Hannah Montana featuring Jonas Brothers	Greg Wells; Kara DioGuardi	Hannah Montana 2	2007	
"We Got the Party" (solo version)	Hannah Montana	Greg Wells; Kara DioGuardi	Hannah Montana 2	2007	
"What's Not to Like"	Hannah Montana	Matthew Gerrard; Robbie Nevil	Hannah Montana: The Movie	2009	
"Wherever I Go"	Hannah Montana	Adam Watts; Andy Dodd; HitmanKTI	Hannah Montana Forever	2010	
"Who Said"	Hannah Montana	Matthew Gerrard; Robbie Nevil; Jay Landers	Hannah Montana	2006	
"You and Me Together"	Hannah Montana	Jamie Houston	Hannah Montana 2	2007	
"You'll Always Find Your Way Back Home"	Hannah Montana	Taylor Swift; Martin Johnson	Hannah Montana: The Movie	2009	
