= Beaumont Music =

British musical instrument accessory company

- Industry: Musical Instrument Company
- Founded: 2010
- Founder: Thea Paraskevaides; Tim Walker
- Headquarters: Brighton, UK
- Website: www.beaumontmusic.co

Beaumont Music is a British musical instrument accessory company, distributing worldwide and focussing on woodwind.

Beaumont Music began as an instrument manufacturer and refurbisher, producing student flutes, clarinets and oboes and repairing instruments for re-sale.

Founded in 2010 by Thea Paraskevaides and Tim Walker in Brighton, the company now makes accessories for musicians with an emphasis on fashion, such as flute bags, clarinet cases, saxophone straps and so on.

In 2020, due to the struggles facing musicians during the COVID-19 pandemic, Beaumont Music founded the Virtual Sounds Festival, a remote music festival. Artists from around the world performed online and offered masterclasses and backstage chats, providing a source of income for musicians and entertainment for the house-bound public. Performers included Beatboxing saxophonist Derek Brown, pianist Ayse Deniz and flute and drums duo RoSaWay.

Beaumont has a roster of artists, with notable musicians including violinist Esther Abrami, and Rachel Ombredane and Stephen Clark both flute players. The brand has an emphasis on sustainability, with cleaning materials made from recycled plastic bottles and bamboo charcoal. Both co-founders have a scientific background with a medical degree and a masters in Science between them, they cite this as the reason for focusing on the use of technical materials in their products.

In 2022, the Beaumont brand was purchased by US musical instrument company JLSmith & Co.

Beaumont are recognised by their colourful designs, including rainbows, polka dots, pinstripes and animal prints.
