= Schmugge =

Schmugge is a surname. Notable people with the surname include:

- Ludwig Schmugge (born 1939), German historian
- Thomas Schmugge, American physicist and hydrologist
- Thorsten Schmugge (born 1971), German footballer
