= Derek Brown (musician) =

American saxophonist

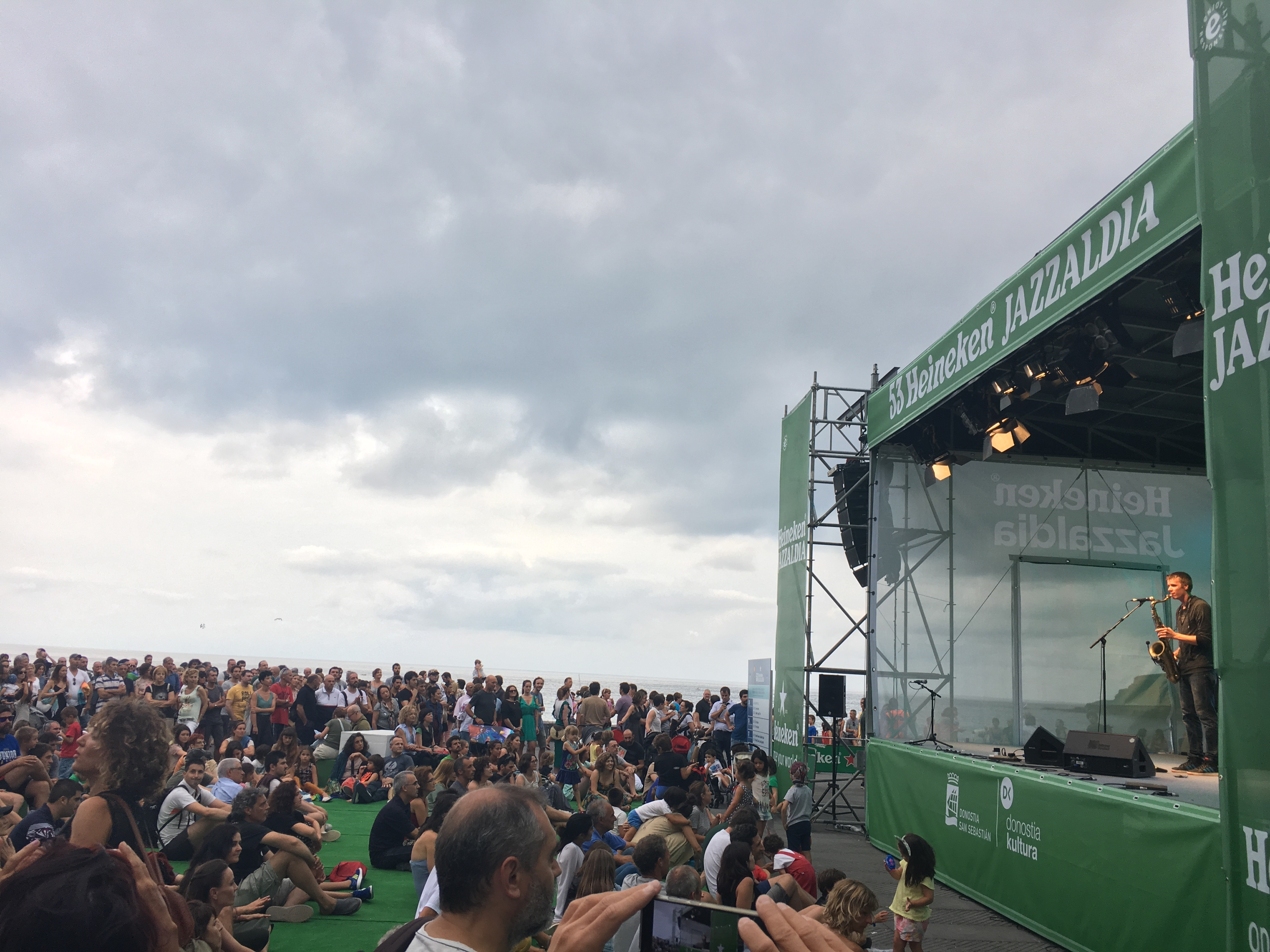
Derek Brown performs at the 53rd Heineken Jazzaldia Festival in San Sebastian, Spain in July 2018.

Derek Brown (born July 18, 1983) is an American saxophonist based out of Chicago, IL. Brown is best known for his particular style of playing, dubbed "BEATBoX SAX," which combines various extended techniques, percussive effects (e.g. stomping and beating his saxophone), and at times vocal elements. He is currently performing a tour involving visiting every US state within 12 months.

Brown has released two solo albums, BEATBoX SAX (2016) and FiftyFifty (2018).

Additional albums include “All Figured Out” in collaboration with the Holland Concert Jazz Orchestra, and “Symbiosis”, a collaboration with Jeff Coffin.

== Early life and career ==
Derek Brown grew up in southwest Michigan and graduated from Hope College with bachelor's degrees in both jazz and classical performance. He earned his master's degree in jazz studies from the University of Cincinnati's College Conservatory of Music. Brown was the director of jazz studies and instructor of saxophone at Abilene Christian University from 2008 to 2014. In 2014 Brown moved to Chicago, IL at which point he began his solo career.

== Solo career ==
In November 2014, Brown began his YouTube channel, BEATBoX SAX. Brown recorded and released his first album, BEATBoX SAX, in 2016, which charted on Billboard's Jazz Albums in Nov. 2016. Brown has been featured on NPR's Weekend Edition, in DownBeat Magazine and on WGN Radio in Chicago, IL (USA).

Brown has performed at music festivals around the world, such as the Heineken Jazzaldia in Spain, Jazz Province festival in Russia, and the Penang Island Jazz Festival in Malaysia. During the COVID-19 Pandemic of 2020, Brown performed at the first Virtual Sounds Festival curated by Beaumont Music.

Brown released his second album, entitled FiftyFifty, on Aug. 31, 2018. Brown's CD release coincided with the start of his FiftyFifty Tour, which includes at least one performance in all 50 states in the US from Aug. 2018 - May 2019.

== Discography ==
Solo Albums:

- BEATBoX SAX (2016)
- FiftyFifty (2018)
- All Figured Out - with the Holland Concert Jazz Orchestra (2020)
