= List of Miley Cyrus live performances =

Miley Cyrus live performances
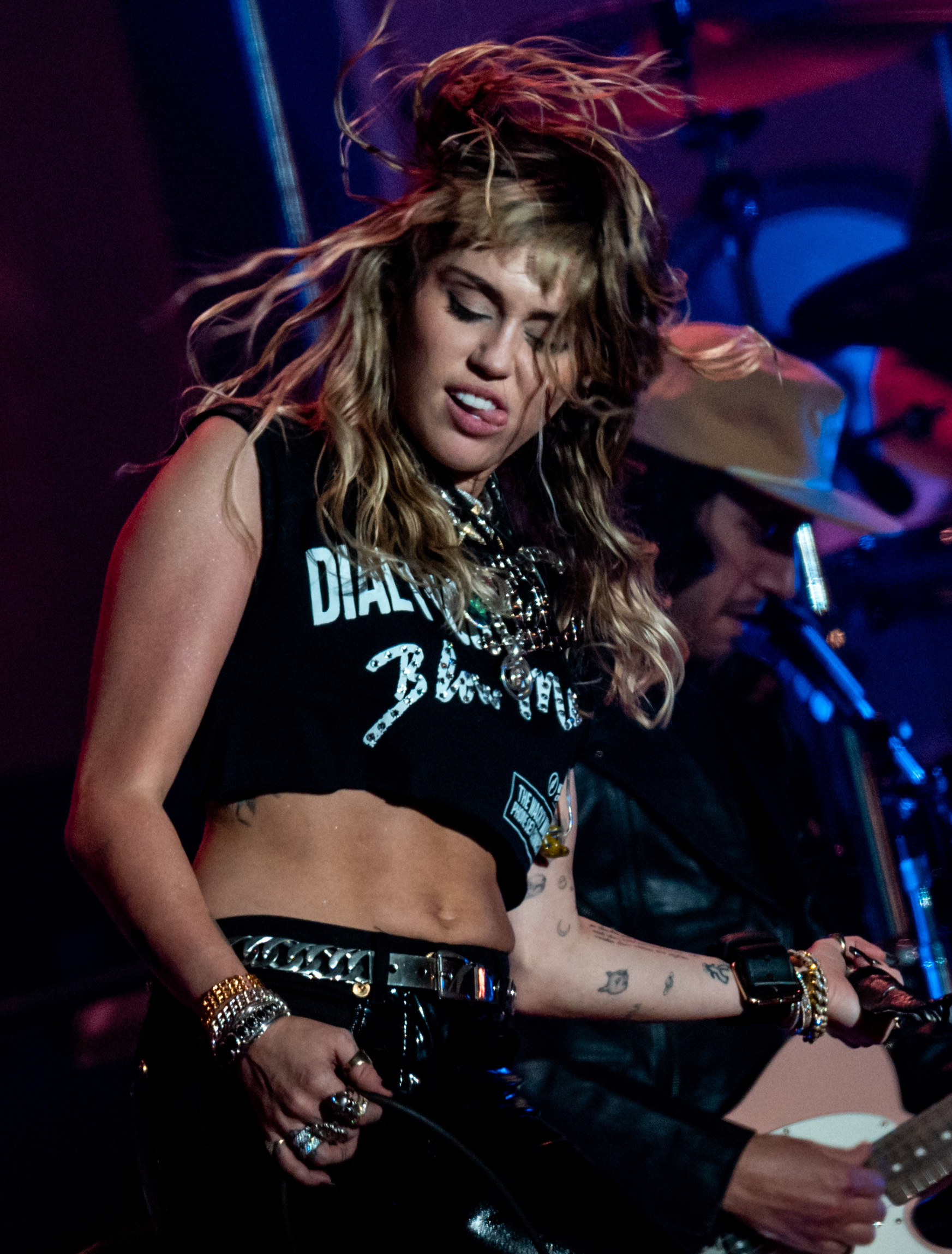
- Cyrus performing at Primavera Sound in Barcelona in 2019
- Concert tours: 7
- One-off concerts: 17
- Music festivals: 39
- Benefit concerts: 11
- Award shows: 29

American singer Miley Cyrus has performed on 7 concert tours, 17 one-off concerts, 39 music festivals, 11 benefit concerts and 29 award shows.

In 2006, she was an opening act for The Cheetah Girls on several American concerts of The Party's Just Begun Tour. In 2007–08 she held her first headlining tour, Best of Both Worlds Tour, promoting her double album Hannah Montana 2: Meet Miley Cyrus. Each show was divided between two parts: the first, where she performed as Hannah Montana, and the second, where she performed her solo songs. Due to 70 shows in North America, it grossed $54 million. In 2009 she embarked her second tour, Wonder World Tour, which visited North America, the United Kingdom and Ireland, grossing $67 million. In 2011 her next tour, Gypsy Heart Tour, visited Latin America, Philippines and Oceania, grossing $29 million. In 2014 she embarked her last to date major tour, Bangerz Tour, supporting Bangerz. Due to almost 80 shows in North America, Europe, South America and Oceania it grossed $64 million. In 2015, she embarked a short, theatre-only Milky Milky Milk Tour, promoting Miley Cyrus & Her Dead Petz. In 2022 she held a series of festival shows during the Attention Tour in Los Angeles and South America.

She played several one-off concerts, including the 2014 MTV Unplugged show, aired on MTV. In 2010 she headlined Rock in Rio festivals in Lisbon and Madrid. In 2013 she held a series of shows on Jingle Ball festival tour. In 2019 she played on a series of European festivals promoting She Is Coming, including BBC Radio 1's Big Weekend and Glastonbury Festival 2019. In 2021 she headlined several American festivals, including Lollapalooza.

== Concert tours ==
=== Headlining ===
List of concert tours, showing dates, associated album(s), number of shows, and relevant statistics
Title	Dates	Associated album	Continent(s)	Shows	Attendance	Gross	Ref.
Best of Both Worlds Tour	October 18, 2007 – January 31, 2008	Hannah Montana 2: Meet Miley Cyrus	North America	70	1,000,000 (est.)	$54,000,000 (est.)	
Wonder World Tour	September 14, 2009 – December 29, 2009	Breakout; The Time of Our Lives	North America; Europe	56	787,004	$66,961,720	
Gypsy Heart Tour	April 29, 2011 – July 2, 2011	Can't Be Tamed	South America; North America; Asia; Oceania	21	289,441	$29,034,075	
Bangerz Tour	February 14, 2014 – October 23, 2014	Bangerz	North America; Europe; South America; Oceania	78	777,718	$63,706,390	
Milky Milky Milk Tour	November 19, 2015 – December 19, 2015	Miley Cyrus & Her Dead Petz	North America	8	Unknown	Unknown	
Attention Tour	February 12, 2022 – March 26, 2022	—N/a	North America; South America	5	Unknown	Unknown	

=== As opening act ===
List of concert tours, showing main act(s), dates, associated album(s) and number of shows
Title	Main act(s)	Dates	Associated album	Continent(s)	Shows	Ref.
The Party's Just Begun Tour	The Cheetah Girls	September 15, 2006 – October 15, 2006	Hannah Montana	North America	20	

== One-off concerts ==
Date	Event	Venue	City	Country	Ref.
March 28, 2007	Hannah Montana: Live in London	Koko	London	England	
June 26, 2007	Hannah Montana 2: Meet Miley Cyrus promotional concert	Hollywood and Highland Center	Los Angeles	United States	
September 27, 2008	—N/a	MGM Grand at Foxwoods Resort Casino	Ledyard	United States	
September 27, 2008	Miley Cyrus: Live in Berlin	Goya	Berlin	Germany	
April 24, 2009	iTunes Live	Apple Store Regent Street	London	England	
May 16, 2009	Atlantis Live	Paradise Island Resort	Nassau	United States	
June 1, 2010	—N/a	1515 Club	Paris	France	
June 5, 2010	—N/a	G-A-Y	London	England	
June 21, 2010	Miley Cyrus: Live in L.A.	House of Blues	Los Angeles	United States	
January 28, 2014	MTV Unplugged	Sunset Gower Studios	Los Angeles	United States	
May 9, 2014	—N/a	G-A-Y	London	England	
September 29, 2017	Younger Now release party	Tootsie's Orchid Lounge	Nashville	United States	
February 2, 2021	TikTok Tailgate	Raymond James Stadium	Tampa	United States	
June 8, 2021	Miley Cyrus Presents Stand By You	Ryman Auditorium	Nashville	United States	
June 18, 2025	Spotify's Billions Club Live	Maxim's	Paris	France	
October 16, 2026	Miley: Bass Persuades - Live at the Hollywood Bowl	Hollywood Bowl	Los Angeles	United States	
October 18, 2026	Miley: Bass Persuades - Live at the Hollywood Bowl	Hollywood Bowl	Los Angeles	United States	

== Music festivals ==
Date	Festival	Venue	City	Country	Ref.
March 9, 2008	Houston Livestock Show and Rodeo	Reliant Stadium	Houston	United States	
May 10, 2008	Wango Tango	Verizon Wireless Amphitheatre	Irvine	United States	
May 17, 2008	Z100 Zootopia	Izod Center	East Rutherford	United States	
July 4, 2008	Stadium of Fire	LaVell Edwards Stadium	Provo	United States	
December 5, 2009	Jingle Bell Ball	The O_{2} Arena	London	England	
May 29, 2010	Rock in Rio Lisboa	Bela Vista Park	Lisbon	Portugal	
September 21, 2013	Rock in Rio Madrid	Ciudad del Rock	Arganda del Rey (Madrid)	Spain	
September 21, 2013	iHeartRadio Music Festival	MGM Grand Garden Arena	Las Vegas	United States	
December 6, 2013	KIIS-FM Jingle Ball	Staples Center	Los Angeles	United States	
December 10, 2013	KDWB's Jingle Ball	Xcel Energy Center	Saint Paul	United States	
December 11, 2013	Power 96.1's Jingle Ball	Philips Arena	Atlanta	United States	
December 13, 2013	Z100 Jingle Ball	Madison Square Garden	New York City	United States	
December 16, 2013	Hot 99.5 Jingle Ball	Verizon Center	Washington, D.C.	United States	
December 18, 2013	93.3 FLZ Jingle Ball	Tampa Bay Times Forum	Tampa	United States	
December 20, 2013	Y100 Jingle Ball	BB&T Center	Sunrise	United States	
June 21, 2014	Summertime Ball	Wembley Stadium	London	England	
September 23, 2016 (Note: Performed as a guest during Billy Idol's set for "Rebel Yell".)	iHeartRadio Music Festival	T-Mobile Arena	Las Vegas	United States	
May 13, 2017	Wango Tango	StubHub Center	Carson	United States	
June 3, 2017	KTUphoria	Northwell Health at Jones Beach Theater	Wantagh	United States	
June 16, 2017	BLI Summer Jam	Northwell Health at Jones Beach Theater	Wantagh	United States	
June 16, 2017	Kiss Concert	Xfinity Center	Mansfield	United States	
September 23, 2017	iHeartRadio Music Festival	T-Mobile Arena	Las Vegas	United States	
May 4, 2019	Beale Street Music Festival	Tom Lee Park	Memphis	United States	
May 24, 2019 (Note: Performed as a guest during Mark Ronson's set for "Nothing Breaks Like a Heart".)	BBC Radio 1's Big Weekend	Stewart Park	Middlesbrough	England	
May 25, 2019	BBC Radio 1's Big Weekend	Stewart Park	Middlesbrough	England	
May 31, 2019	Primavera Sound	Parc del Fòrum	Barcelona	Spain	
June 1, 2019	Orange Warsaw Festival	Służewiec Racetrack	Warsaw	Poland	
June 28, 2019	Tinderbox	Tusindårsskoven	Odense	Denmark	
June 30, 2019	Glastonbury Festival	Worthy Farm	Pilton	England	
August 2, 2019	Sunny Hill Festival	Germia Park	Pristina	Kosovo	
September 21, 2019	iHeartRadio Music Festival	T-Mobile Arena	Las Vegas	United States	
September 3, 2020	iHeartRadio Music Festival	iHeartRadio Theater	Burbank	United States	
July 29, 2021	Lollapalooza	Grant Park	Chicago	United States	
September 4, 2021	BottleRock Napa Valley	Napa Valley Expo	Napa	United States	
September 17, 2021	Summerfest	American Family Insurance Amphitheater	Milwaukee	United States	
September 19, 2021	Music Midtown	Piedmont Park	Atlanta	United States	
October 1, 2021	Austin City Limits Music Festival	Zilker Park	Austin	United States	
October 8, 2021	Austin City Limits Music Festival	Zilker Park	Austin	United States	
November 20, 2022	Corona Capital	Autódromo Hermanos Rodríguez	Mexico City	Mexico	

== Benefit concerts ==
Date	Show	Venue	City	Country	Performed song(s)	Ref.
September 5, 2008	Fashion Rocks	Radio City Music Hall	New York City	United States	"Just Stand Up!" (as a part of Artists Stand Up to Cancer)	
September 14, 2008	Concert for Hope	Gibson Amphitheatre	Universal City	United States	Multiple	
January 19, 2009	Kids' Inaugural: "We Are the Future"	Verizon Center	Washington, D.C.	United States	"The Climb"; "Fly on the Wall"; "See You Again"; "Ready, Set, Don't Go" (with Billy Ray Cyrus)	
October 25, 2009	Concert of Hope	Nokia Theater	Los Angeles	United States	Multiple	
December 7, 2009	Royal Variety Performance	Opera House Theatre	Blackpool	England	"Party in the U.S.A."	
June 22, 2010	Nashville Rising Benefit Concert	Bridgestone Arena	Nashville	United States	"The Climb"	
December 11, 2011	CNN Heroes	Shrine Auditorium	Los Angeles	United States	"The Climb"	
October 17, 2015	Hilarity for Charity	Hollywood Palladium	Los Angeles	United States	"Super Freak"; "I'm Your Man"; "We Can't Stop"; "Shout"	
May 15, 2017	Robin Hood Foundation Gala	Jacob K. Javits Convention Center	New York City	United States	"Talkin' 'bout a Revolution"; "Inspired"	
June 4, 2017	One Love Manchester	Old Trafford Cricket Ground	Manchester	England	"Happy" (with Pharrell Williams); "Inspired"; "Don't Dream It's Over" (with Ariana Grande)	
June 27, 2020	Global Goal: Unite for Our Future	Rose Bowl	Pasadena	United States	"Help!"	

== Award shows ==
Date	Show	Venue	City	Country	Performed song(s)	Ref.
March 29, 2008	2008 Kids' Choice Awards	Pauley Pavilion	Los Angeles	United States	"G.N.O. (Girl's Night Out)"	
April 14, 2008	2008 CMT Music Awards	Curb Event Center	Nashville	United States	"Ready, Set, Don't Go" (with Billy Ray Cyrus)	
August 4, 2008	2008 Teen Choice Awards	Gibson Amphitheatre	Universal City	United States	"7 Things"	
November 23, 2008	American Music Awards of 2008	Nokia Theatre	Los Angeles	United States	"Fly on the Wall"	
February 8, 2009	51st Annual Grammy Awards	Staples Center	Los Angeles	United States	"Fifteen" (with Taylor Swift)	
April 5, 2009	43rd Academy of Country Music Awards	MGM Grand Garden Arena	Las Vegas	United States	"The Climb"	
August 9, 2009	2009 Teen Choice Awards	Gibson Amphitheatre	Universal City	United States	"Party in the U.S.A."	
June 20, 2010	2010 MuchMusic Video Awards	299 Queen Street West	Toronto	Canada	"Party in the U.S.A."; "Can't Be Tamed"	
November 7, 2010	2010 MTV Europe Music Awards	Caja Mágica	Madrid	Spain	"Who Owns My Heart"	
November 21, 2010	American Music Awards of 2010	Nokia Theatre	Los Angeles	United States	"Forgiveness and Love"	
August 25, 2013	2013 MTV Video Music Awards	Barclays Center	New York City	United States	"We Can't Stop"; "Blurred Lines" (with Robin Thicke)	
November 10, 2013	2013 MTV Europe Music Awards	Ziggo Dome	Amsterdam	Netherlands	"We Can't Stop"; "Wrecking Ball"	
November 14, 2013	2013 Bambi Awards	Theater am Potsdamer Platz	Berlin	Germany	"Wrecking Ball"	
November 24, 2013	American Music Awards of 2013	Nokia Theatre	Los Angeles	United States	"Wrecking Ball"	
May 18, 2014 (Note: Pre-recorded during her Bangerz Tour concert in Manchester.)	2014 Billboard Music Awards	Phones 4u Arena	Manchester	England	"Lucy in the Sky with Diamonds" (with the Flaming Lips)	
May 27, 2014	2014 World Music Awards	Salle des Etoiles	Monaco	Monaco	"Wrecking Ball"	
April 18, 2015	30th Annual Rock and Roll Hall of Fame Induction Ceremony	Public Auditorium	Cleveland	United States	"Crimson and Clover" (with Joan Jett and the Blackhearts and others) (Note: Also participated in a group accompanying Ringo Starr and Paul McCartney during the performance of "With a Little Help from My Friends" and "I Wanna Be Your Man".)	
August 30, 2015	2015 MTV Video Music Awards	Microsoft Theater	Los Angeles	United States	"Dooo It!"	
October 23, 2016	2016 Mark Twain Prize for American Humor	Kennedy Center	Washington, D.C.	United States	"My Way"	
May 21, 2017	2017 Billboard Music Awards	T-Mobile Arena	Las Vegas	United States	"Malibu"	
August 27, 2017	2017 MTV Video Music Awards	The Forum	Inglewood	United States	"Younger Now"	
January 26, 2018	2018 MusiCares Person of the Year	Radio City Music Hall	New York City	United States	"Landslide"	
January 28, 2018	60th Annual Grammy Awards	Madison Square Garden	New York City	United States	"Tiny Dancer" (with Elton John)	
June 7, 2018	46th AFI Life Achievement Award	Dolby Theatre	Los Angeles	United States	"Man of Constant Sorrow"	
February 8, 2019	2019 MusiCares Person of the Year	Los Angeles Convention Center	Los Angeles	United States	"Islands in the Stream" (with Shawn Mendes and Mark Ronson)	
February 10, 2019	61st Annual Grammy Awards	Staples Center	Los Angeles	United States	"In My Blood" (with Shawn Mendes); "Jolene"/"After the Gold Rush"/"9 to 5" (with Dolly Parton and others)	
August 26, 2019	2019 MTV Video Music Awards	Prudential Center	Newark	United States	"Slide Away"	
August 30, 2020	2020 MTV Video Music Awards	Unknown	New York City	United States	"Midnight Sky"	
February 4, 2024	66th Annual Grammy Awards	Crypto.com Arena	Los Angeles	United States	"Flowers"	
