= Attention Tour =

2021–2022 concert tour by Miley Cyrus

- Continental tour by Miley Cyrus
- Promotional image for the tour in Colombia
- Location: North America; South America
- Associated album: Plastic Hearts
- Start date: July 29, 2021
- End date: March 26, 2022
- No. of shows: 11

Miley Cyrus concert chronology
- Milky Milky Milk Tour (2015); Attention Tour (2021–2022); ...

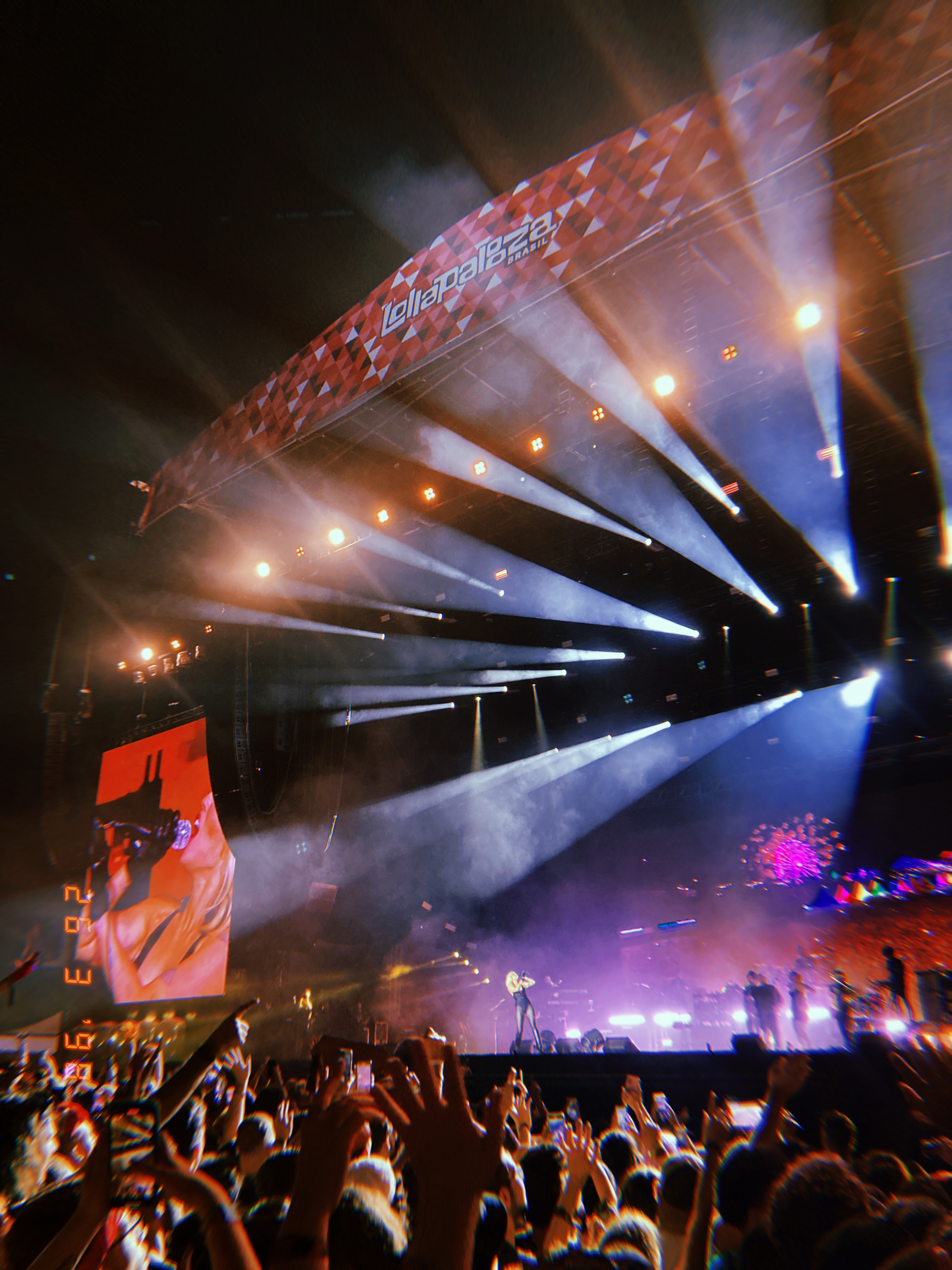
Cyrus performing for the tour at Lollapalooza Brazil

The Attention Tour was a festival tour by American singer Miley Cyrus in support of her seventh studio album, Plastic Hearts (2020). It was her sixth headlining tour. The tour began on July 29, 2021, in Chicago, United States, and concluding on March 26, 2022, in São Paulo, Brazil. On April 1, six days after the tour's end, Cyrus released a live album of the Los Angeles performance entitled Attention: Miley Live.

== Set list ==
This set list is representative of the concert on March 21, 2022. It does not represent all concerts for the duration of the tour.

1. "Attention" (Video Introduction)
2. "We Can't Stop" (contains elements of "Where Is My Mind?")
3. "WTF Do I Know"
4. "Plastic Hearts"
5. "Heart of Glass"
6. "Mother's Daughter"
7. "4x4"
8. "(SMS) Bangerz"
9. "Dooo It!"
10. "23"
11. "Never Be Me"
12. "Angels like You"
13. "High"
14. "You"
15. "The Climb"
16. "7 Things"
17. "Bang Bang" / "See You Again"
18. "Fly on the Wall"
19. "Nothing Breaks Like a Heart"
20. "Jolene"
21. "Midnight Sky"

Encore

22. "Wrecking Ball"
23. "Party in the U.S.A."

=== Notes ===
- During the performance in São Paulo, Cyrus dedicated the show to Taylor Hawkins, who died the day before, and Cyrus performed with Anitta.

== Tour dates ==
List of 2021 concerts with date, city, country, and venue
Date	City	Country	Venue
July 29, 2021 (Note: Part of Lollapalooza)	Chicago	United States	Grant Park
September 4, 2021 (Note: Part of Bottlerock Festival)	Napa	United States	Napa Valley Expo
September 17, 2021 (Note: Part of Summerfest)	Milwaukee	United States	Henry Maier Festival Park
September 19, 2021 (Note: Part of Music Midtown)	Atlanta	United States	Piedmont Park
October 1, 2021 (Note: Part of Austin City Limits)	Austin	United States	Zilker Park
October 8, 2021 (Note: Part of Austin City Limits)	Austin	United States	Zilker Park

List of 2022 concerts with date, city, country, and venue
Date	City	Country	Venue
February 12, 2022 (Note: Part of Bud Light Super Bowl Music Fest)	Los Angeles	United States	Crypto.com Arena
March 18, 2022 (Note: Part of Lollapalooza)	San Isidro	Argentina	Hipódromo de San Isidro
March 19, 2022	Santiago	Chile	Bicentennial Park
March 21, 2022	Bogotá	Colombia	Movistar Arena
March 26, 2022	São Paulo	Brazil	Interlagos Circuit

=== Cancelled shows ===
List of cancelled shows
Date (2022)	City	Country	Venue	Reason
March 23 (Note: Part of Asunciónico)	Asunción	Paraguay	Espacio Idesa	Weather conditions
