= Milky Milky Milk Tour =

2015 concert tour by Miley Cyrus

- Continental tour by Miley Cyrus
- Promotional banner for the tour
- Location: North America
- Associated album: Miley Cyrus & Her Dead Petz
- Start date: November 19, 2015
- End date: December 19, 2015
- Legs: 1
- No. of shows: 8

Miley Cyrus concert chronology
- Bangerz Tour (2014); Milky Milky Milk Tour (2015); Attention Tour (2021–2022)

The Milky Milky Milk Tour (initially called the Miley Cyrus & Her Dead Petz Tour) was the fifth concert tour by American singer Miley Cyrus, held in support of her fifth studio album, Miley Cyrus & Her Dead Petz (2015). The limited-run tour visited eight cities across North America. She was joined by the Flaming Lips and Dan Deacon throughout the tour.

== Background and development ==
Cyrus announced the tour on October 3, 2015 through her Instagram account after her appearance on Saturday Night Live, adding tickets for the tour would be on sale on October 7, 2015. Live Nation promoted the tour. On November 4, 2015, Cyrus announced two additional tour dates in Vancouver, British Columbia, Canada and Los Angeles. She also announced the tour had been renamed the Milky Milky Milk Tour.

One of the outfits Cyrus wore on the tour was an S&M/bondage style top that included fake breasts (to give the illusion of toplessness), and a giant prosthetic penis. Cyrus wore this outfit while performing "Karen Don't Be Sad". The costume was designed and created by artist Colin Christian.

On December 19, 2015, go90 live streamed Cyrus' December 19 show in Los Angeles, the farewell night of the tour. The stream ran for a length of 130 minutes, recording the entire show.

== Set list ==
This set list is representative of the concert on November 28, 2015. It does not represent all concerts for the duration of the tour.

1. "Dooo It!"
2. "Love Money Party"
3. "1 Sun"
4. "The Floyd Song (Sunrise)"
5. "Something About Space Dude"
6. "Space Bootz"
7. "BB Talk"
8. "Fweaky"
9. "Bang Me Box"
10. "Lighter"
11. "Slab of Butter"
12. "I Forgive Yiew"
13. "Milky Milky Milk"
14. "Miley Tibetan Bowlzzz"
15. "Tiger Dreams"
16. "Pablow the Blowfish"
17. "Twinkle Song"

Encore

18. "Karen Don't Be Sad"
19. "Evil Is But a Shadow"
20. "We Can't Stop"

=== Notes ===
- During the concert in Detroit, Cyrus performed "You Are My Sunshine" and "Miss You So Much" (which would later be released on Younger Now).

== Tour dates ==
List of concerts with date, city, country and venue
Date (2015)	City	Country	Venue
November 19	Chicago	United States	Riviera Theatre
November 21	Detroit	United States	The Fillmore Detroit
November 27	Washington, D.C.	United States	Echostage
November 28	New York City	United States	Terminal 5
December 5	Philadelphia	United States	Electric Factory
December 6	Boston	United States	House of Blues
December 14	Vancouver	Canada	Queen Elizabeth Theatre
December 19	Los Angeles	United States	Wiltern Theatre

List of box office score data
Venue	City	Tickets sold / available	Gross revenue
House of Blues	Boston	2,436 / 2,553 (95%)	$169,218
