= BB Talk =

2015 song by Miley Cyrus

Song by Miley Cyrus

from the album Miley Cyrus & Her Dead Petz
- Released: August 30, 2015
- Studio: Love Yer Brain Studios
- Genre: Trip hop
- Length: 4:32
- Label: Smiley Miley; RCA
- Songwriter: Miley Cyrus
- Producers: Oren Yoel; The Flaming Lips; Miley Cyrus

Music video
- "BB Talk" on YouTube

"BB Talk" is a song by American singer Miley Cyrus for her fifth studio album Miley Cyrus & Her Dead Petz (2015). It was premiered through SoundCloud on August 30, 2015 alongside the parent record. Its lyrics discuss Cyrus' frustration with an overbearing romantic interest over primarily spoken verses. "BB Talk" was supplemented with an accompanying music video on December 11, 2015, featuring Cyrus as an adult baby. Cyrus performed the track during her Milky Milky Milk Tour in November and December.

== Composition ==
The track was written and produced by Cyrus, with additional production provided by Oren Yoel and The Flaming Lips. "BB Talk" is the seventh track on Miley Cyrus & Her Dead Petz, and plays for a duration of four minutes and thirty-two seconds. The previous track "Fuckin Fucked Up" is a 51-second interlude between "Space Bootz" and "BB Talk", repeating the latter's opening lyrics "this is really fucked up". The song is "about a girl who’s tired of hearing her boyfriend make baby talk every time they have sex" and features Cyrus singing the lyric "Fuck me so you stop baby talking". NME described the song as being "hip-hop-flavoured [sic]".

== Music video ==
MTV posted a 10-second preview of the music video for "BB Talk" on their website on December 9, showing Cyrus dressed in a curly blonde wig and purple pajama onesie while sucking on a pacifier. The clip was premiered in its entirety through their website on December 11, and was released onto Vevo platforms later that evening. Directed by Cyrus herself alongside longtime collaborator Diane Martel, it drew media attention for its depiction of Cyrus as an adult baby.

== Credits and personnel ==
Credits adapted from Cyrus' website.

Recording

- Recorded at Love Yer Brain Studios
- Mixed at Whitley Room Studios (Hollywood, California)

Personnel

- Miley Cyrus – lead vocals, songwriting, vocal production, mixing
- Doron Dina – assistant
- The Flaming Lips – vocal production, mixing
- Oren Yoel – production, instruments, programming

== Charts ==
Chart (2016)	Peak position
Canada Hot 100 (Billboard)	86
UK Video Streaming (Official Charts)	93
