= When I Look at You =

2010 single by Miley Cyrus

Single by Miley Cyrus

from the EP The Time of Our Lives
- Released: February 15, 2010
- Recorded: 2009
- Studio: 3180 Media Group (Savannah, GA)
- Genre: Pop rock
- Length: 4:10
- Label: Hollywood
- Songwriters: Hillary Lindsey; John Shanks
- Producer: Shanks

Miley Cyrus singles chronology
"Party in the U.S.A." (2009)	"When I Look at You" (2010)	"Nothing to Lose" (2010)

Music video
- "When I Look at You" on YouTube

"When I Look at You" is a song recorded by American singer Miley Cyrus. The song was written by Hillary Lindsey and its producer John Shanks. It was released on February 15, 2010 by Hollywood Records as the second and final single from Cyrus' first EP, The Time of Our Lives (2009). The song was featured in the 2010 film The Last Song (starring Cyrus) and its corresponding soundtrack, being used to promote the film. The track contains an instrumentation primarily based on piano, while its lyrics speak of a dream boy.

"When I Look at You" received mixed critical reception and was unable to duplicate the commercial success of Cyrus' previous single, "Party in the U.S.A.". The song peaked at number 16 on the Billboard Hot 100 and charted within the top thirty on charts in Australia, Canada, and New Zealand. It is certified triple platinum in the US and Australia, platinum in Norway, and gold in Denmark, Germany, Spain, and the United Kingdom. The song's accompanying music video was directed by Adam Shankman. It features Cyrus playing a grand piano throughout several settings, including a beach and forest. Two other versions of the video were released: one replacing several scenes with clips from The Last Song and another featuring David Bisbal. The song was included on her first world tour, the Wonder World Tour (2009).

In 2020, the song unexpectedly gained popularity again due to being featured in a video challenge on the popular video sharing app TikTok. It skyrocketed up the charts on Spotify and Apple Music, even managing to become one of Cyrus' top-ten most popular songs on Spotify.

== Background ==
"When I Look at You" was written by Hillary Lindsey and John Shanks. It was used to promote the 2010 coming-of-age romantic drama film The Last Song based on Nicholas Sparks' novel of the same name, in which Cyrus stars as Veronica "Ronnie" Miller, an angry, rebellious seventeen-year-old forced to spend a summer with her estranged father, Steve (Greg Kinnear). The song was first included on Cyrus's 2009 extended play The Time of Our Lives and then on the film and its corresponding soundtrack. The song was initially to be included on Cyrus's 2010 album Can't Be Tamed; however, it was decided to include it on The Time of Our Lives as well as The Last Song because it fit the film's concept well. According to Cyrus, when she sings "When I Look at You", she thinks of family and love. "It's kind of what this movie is all about", she said. A remix version titled "Te Miro a Ti", featuring Spanish singer David Bisbal was released later; in it, Cyrus sings her lines in English, while Bisbal's are mingled in English and Spanish.

== Composition ==
"When I Look at You" (2010)
A sample of Miley Cyrus's "When I Look at You". Taken from the latter half of the song, the sample contains an electric guitar solo and the beginning of the third chorus.

"When I Look at You" is a length of four minutes and ten seconds. According to Katie Byrne of MTV News, the song is a power ballad. The pop rock song is set in 3/4 time and has a moderate tempo of 138 beats per minute. It is written in the key of G♭ major and Cyrus's vocals span two octaves, from G♭_{3} to E♭_{5}. The song begins with piano in its intro and then transitions to Cyrus singing in a hushed tone. She begins to belt towards the second verse and an electric guitar solo follows the second chorus, showing the influence of country music on the song. It follows the chord progression E♭m–G♭–D♭–C♭–C♭. Jocelyn Vena, also of MTV News, interpreted the lyrics of "When I Look at You" to be about Cyrus' dream boy. According to Byrne, the last line — "You appear just like a dream to me" — is very fantasy-like.

== Critical reception ==
Reception from contemporary critics for the song has been average to mixed, with Variety magazine's Lael Lowenstein calling it an "almost inevitable hit single" and Allmusic's Heather Phares noting that "When she lets her ... ballad-singing diva come to the fore, Cyrus really shines." Phares added, "She is just as accomplished on the EP's ballads". Bill Lamb of About.com disagreed and stated, "the two ballad songs, 'When I Look At You' and 'Obsessed,' feel like throwaways. Miley Cyrus did have a big hit with the highly inspirational 'The Climb,' but the ballads here flush out the distinctiveness in her voice and simply feel ordinary." Michael Hann of the English newspaper The Guardian referred to "When I Look at You" as one of the "inferior ballads" on The Time of Our Lives. The song won the 2010 Teen Choice Award for "Choice Music: Love Song".

== Chart performance ==
In the United States, on the week ending January 30, 2010, "When I Look at You" debuted at number 88 on the Billboard Hot 100. On the week ending April 17, 2010, "When I Look at You" ascended to its peak at number 16, from its previous position at number 25, on the Billboard Hot 100. The song peaked at number 18 on Billboard's Adult Contemporary Chart. The song first appeared on the Canadian Hot 100 at number 59 and peaked at number 24. As of March 2023, "When I Look At You" has sold over 3,000,000 copies in the United States and was certified triple platinum by the Recording Industry Association of America (RIAA).

The song also made moderate success in Australia and New Zealand. The song entered the Australian Singles Chart at number 50 and, after three weeks of ascending the chart, reached its peak at number 19. In New Zealand, "When I Look at You" debuted and peaked at number 27. The song debuted at number 79 on the UK Singles Chart. On the week ending April 1, 2010, it debuted and peaked at number 45 on the Irish Singles Chart. In mainland Europe, "When I Look at You" peaked at number 23 on the Wallonian (French-speaking) Belgian Ultratip Singles Chart and number 49 on the Swiss Singles Chart.

== Music video ==
Cyrus sitting beside Australian actor Liam Hemsworth while playing a black grand piano in the music video for "When I Look at You".

The music video for "When I Look at You" was directed by Adam Shankman, producer of The Last Song. The video was filmed on August 16, 2009 in several outdoor settings in Savannah, Georgia. "The premise of the video for 'When I Look at You' is to put together the relationships between Miley, the piano, and music, her relationship with Liam, her relationship to the song", Shankman commented, in regards to the video's concept. He believed Cyrus and Hemsworth had "great chemistry" while filming The Last Song and brought it into the set of the video. The video opens by showing a black grand piano alone on a pier, which transitions to a close-up of Cyrus with her wavy hair styled loose. She is shown playing the piano in a long white dress. Australian actor Liam Hemsworth, who portrays Will Blakelee in The Last Song, appears next to the piano, Cyrus not being present. Throughout the rest of the video, Cyrus sings and plays the piano in a forest, the beach, and a mansion's front yard. Cut-scenes feature Cyrus and Hemsworth interacting romantically, at one point kissing in a wheat field. The video ends by, again, showing the piano alone in the pier. Two alternate versions of the music video were later released: one replaces the cut-scenes of Cyrus and Hemsworth with clips from The Last Song, and another for the song's remix featuring Bisbal. The latter version replaces cut-scenes with shots of Bisbal signing in a forest and beach; his scenes were directed by Marc Roussel.

The video was officially premiered on February 21, 2010 on ABC Family, but was previously leaked to the Internet on September 11, 2009. Jocelyn Vena of MTV News congratulated Shankman for capturing romance in the video. She further commented, "Cyrus is definitely growing up, something she's wanted to prove to the world for a while now. And although there's nothing particularly jarring in the clip, the vibe shows that Cyrus is most certainly ready to leave Hannah Montana behind." Jefferson Reid of E! reviewed the version where clips from the film are used, and said the clips made production values high, "but also helping to keep things easy on the eyes".

== Live performances ==
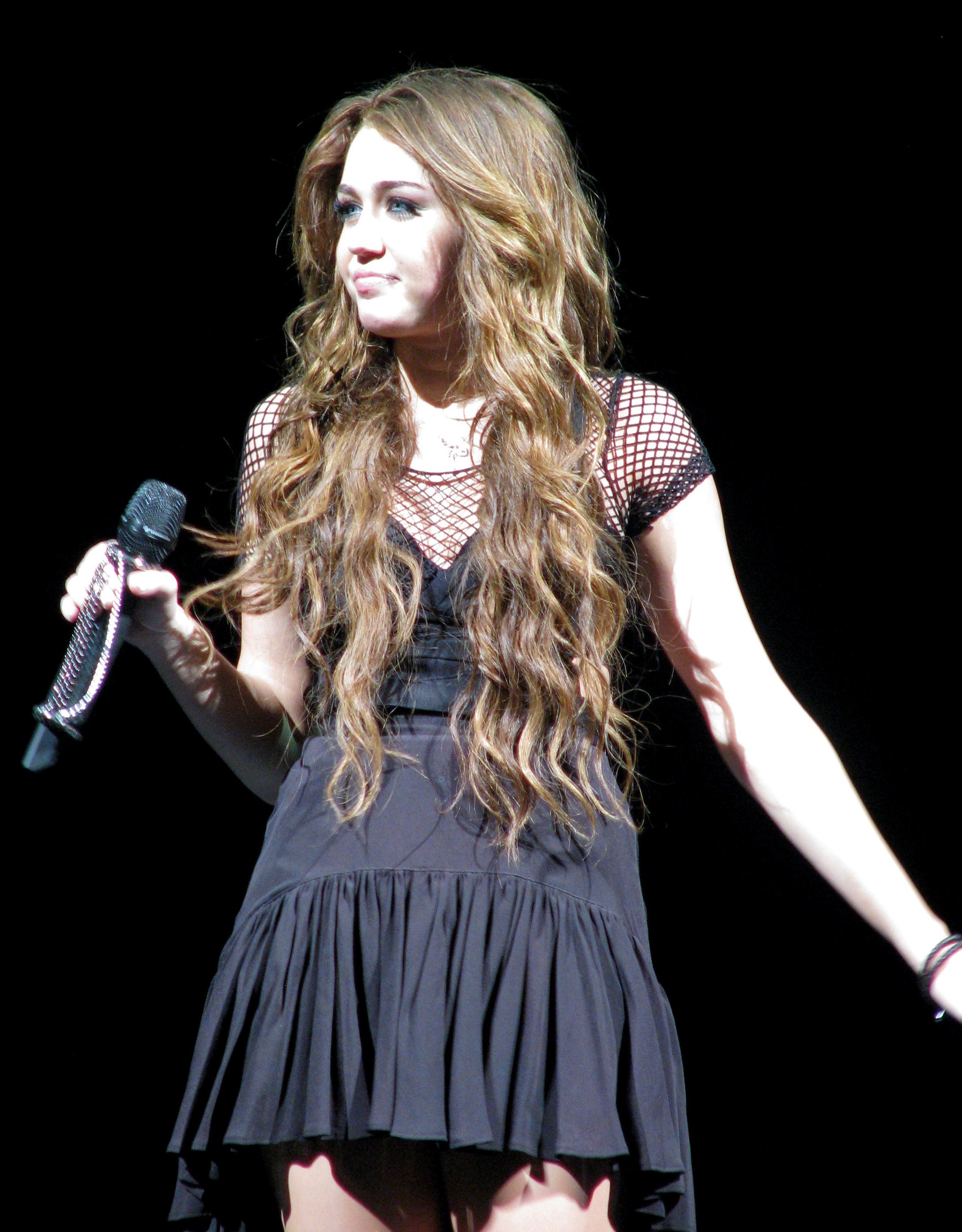
Cyrus performing "When I Look at You" during the Wonder World Tour.

Cyrus performed "When I Look at You" at the 2009 Wonder World Tour, her first world tour. She performed the song at each venue during the tour, wearing a black dress with tail that extended below her knees. The performances began with large video screens surrounding the stage displaying The Last Song's trailer; the trailer premiered the on September 14 concert in Portland, Oregon, at the Rose Garden Arena, the Wonder World Tour's opening night. Cyrus then emerged from the bottom of the stage while playing a white grand piano, sitting on a bench. Midway through the song, Cyrus stood up and continued performing while the video screens were brought down to Cyrus' height. Cyrus described the performance as a "sneak preview" of The Last Song, adding that her excitement about the life imitating art scenario she experienced while filming The Last Song led her to show the movie on tour. Melinda M. Thompson of The Oregonian believed that by playing the piano at the opening night's performance of "When I Look at You", Cyrus "showcased her many talents and proved she really just beginning to grasp her star power." Mikael Wood of The Los Angeles Times attended the September 22 concert in Los Angeles, California at the Staples Center and commented, "Once again, make-believe Miley was more compelling than the real thing."

Upon its release as a single, Cyrus performed "When I Look at You" on the ninth season of singing competition American Idol on March 24, 2010, the same week she mentored the contestants on the show. Dressed in a long, white satin dress, she began by sitting in a bench to play the piano and later standing up to sing; the set was decorated with trees and twinkling outdoor lighting. Katie Byrne of MTV News commented, "Cyrus seemed to take her own advice by connecting with the audience and making eye contact during the dramatic performance." Monica Herrera of Billboard said Cyrus, after mentoring the contestants, she "showed them how it's really done". Cyrus later performed the song on MSN Movies. Her first televised performance of the song outside the United States was at the Rock in Rio concert in Lisbon, Portugal on May 29, 2010. Cyrus was joined by David Bisbal to perform "When I Look at You" at the Rock in Rio concert in Madrid, Spain on June 4, 2010.

== Charts ==
=== Weekly charts ===
Weekly chart performance for "When I Look at You"
Chart (2010)	Peak position
Australia (ARIA)	19
Austria (Ö3 Austria Top 40)	57
Belgium (Ultratip Bubbling Under Wallonia)	23
Canada Hot 100 (Billboard)	24
Germany (GfK)	60
Ireland (IRMA)	45
New Zealand (Recorded Music NZ)	27
Sweden Heatseeker (Sverigetopplistan)	4
Switzerland (Schweizer Hitparade)	49
UK Singles (Official Charts)	79
US Billboard Hot 100	16
US Adult Contemporary (Billboard)	18
US Adult Pop Airplay (Billboard)	38

=== Year-end charts ===
Year-end chart performance for "When I Look at You"
Chart (2010)	Position
US Adult Contemporary (Billboard)	39

== Certifications ==
Certifications for "When I Look at You"
Region	Certification	Certified units/sales
Australia (ARIA)	3× Platinum	210,000^{‡}
Brazil (Pro-Música Brasil)	Gold	30,000^{‡}
Denmark (IFPI Danmark)	Platinum	90,000^{‡}
Germany (BVMI)	Gold	150,000^{‡}
New Zealand (RMNZ)	2× Platinum	60,000^{‡}
Norway (IFPI Norway)	Platinum	60,000^{‡}
Spain (Promusicae)	Gold	30,000^{‡}
United Kingdom (BPI)	Gold	400,000^{‡}
United States (RIAA)	3× Platinum	3,000,000^{‡}
^{‡} Sales+streaming figures based on certification alone.

== Release history ==
"When I Look at You" release history
Region	Date	Format(s)	Label	Ref.
United States	February 15, 2010	Adult contemporary radio; hot adult contemporary radio; modern adult contemporary radio	Hollywood	
United States	February 16, 2010	Contemporary hit radio	Hollywood	
