= The Time of Our Lives (EP) =

2009 EP by Miley Cyrus

- Standard cover

EP by Miley Cyrus
- Released: August 28, 2009
- Genre: Pop rock
- Length: 26:20
- Label: Hollywood
- Producers: Dr. Luke; John Shanks

Miley Cyrus chronology
| Hannah Montana 3 (2009) | The Time of Our Lives (2009) | Can't Be Tamed (2010) |

Alternative cover
- International cover

Singles from The Time of Our Lives
- 1. "Party in the U.S.A." Released: August 11, 2009; 2. "When I Look at You" Released: February 15, 2010

The Time of Our Lives is the first extended play (EP) by American singer Miley Cyrus. The EP was released on August 28, 2009, by Hollywood Records, initially as a Walmart exclusive in the United States. Most of the album was produced by John Shanks; Dr. Luke also produced. The Time of Our Lives was originally conceived as a release to accompany Cyrus' apparel line with Max Azria. Cyrus had fairly limited involvement in the composition of the release, only having writing credits on one track: a live version of the previously released Jonas Brothers collaboration, "Before the Storm".

The Time of Our Lives received generally positive reactions from critics, with some reviews suggesting that the EP was an effective step into adulthood for Cyrus. Some reviews were critical of the ballads which appear on the record, however. The EP was a commercial success, charting within the top ten in nine countries. In the United States, The Time of Our Lives peaked at number two on the Billboard 200 and was certified triple platinum by the Recording Industry Association of America (RIAA). Moreover, the EP had success internationally, peaking at number three in Greece, number five in Austria, and number six in Spain.

Two singles were released from The Time of Our Lives. The lead single, "Party in the U.S.A.", became Cyrus' best-selling effort up to that point, peaking at number two in the Billboard Hot 100. It also became one of the best-selling singles in the United States and Hollywood Records' best- and fastest-selling single. The second and final single released from the EP was "When I Look at You". It was used to promote the 2010 film The Last Song, which Cyrus starred in. Unable to match the success of "Party in the U.S.A.", the single peaked within the top twenty in Australia and the United States. In late 2009, Cyrus embarked on her first world tour, the Wonder World Tour, to promote the EP.

== Background ==
"It is a transitioning album. Everything is like a stepping stone. And that was really to introduce people to what I want my next record to sound like and with time I will be able to do that a little more and timing is just everything. So it is really about us working our way up to being able to do the music you really love."

— Cyrus discussing the transition she experienced during the production of The Time of Our Lives.

In order to support Cyrus' then newly launched, joint apparel line with Max Azria, sold exclusively by Walmart stores, an EP was chosen for release. "I feel it goes perfect for that kind of look", she commented. For Cyrus, The Time of Our Lives was a transitional EP and a method of re-introducing herself to new audiences. Speaking about the EP's sound, she said, "I kind of kept it in the lines of what I usually do, which is kind of a pop rock sound — I don't even like using the word 'rock,' because I feel like it's an honor to be put in that title. This is kind of my transition. The next record, I definitely want to be able to step it up a bit." Cyrus originally planned for her succeeding album to be edgier and more predominant in rock music. She said that, after completing promotion for The Time of Our Lives, she wanted to "step out and maybe take a break" for some time in order to compose music that inspires her. Cyrus' next album, Can't Be Tamed was released approximately ten months later, on June 18, 2010.

At first, The Time of Our Lives was exclusively released through the American retail company Walmart, available in American stores and at Walmart.com. The album was originally planned for release on August 31, 2009, but because of a confusion at various stores, the album was released three days prior than intended. Several months afterwards, an international edition was released in numerous countries, beginning with the United Kingdom on October 16, 2009. With the addition of "The Climb" from Hannah Montana: The Movie, released earlier in 2009, the edition also featured new cover artwork, with photography by Annie Leibovitz. On January 5, 2010, the EP became available for purchasing on other digital retailers in the United States.

== Development ==
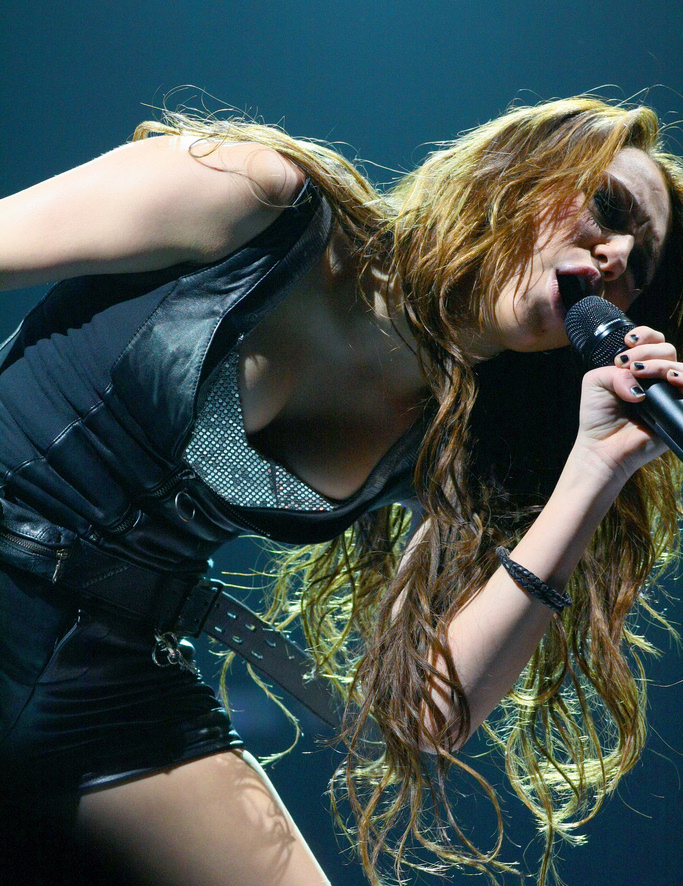
Cyrus performing "Kicking and Screaming" during the Wonder World Tour

Cyrus recorded a cover version of "Kicking and Screaming", written by John Shanks and Kara DioGuardi, and originally recorded by Ashlee Simpson for her 2005 album I Am Me. "Party in the U.S.A." was written by Dr. Luke, Claude Kelly, and Jessica Cornish. The song was not originally meant for Cyrus to perform, but, once it reached Cyrus, the writing team reworked the lyrics, intending to write an accompanying theme for the clothing line. In order to please audiences, Dr. Luke, Kelly, and Cornish fixated on composing a fun, upbeat song that narrated reflections of Cyrus' personality. To write his contributions to the song, Kelly said he tried to mimic Cyrus' songwriting: "It's the same song from a different point of view, you just have to find that unique perspective." Cyrus was pleased with the song and selected it partially due to the need for tracks to appear on The Time of Our Lives. "When I Look at You", written by Shanks and Hillary Lindsey, was initially to be included on Cyrus' succeeding album; it was eventually chosen to promote the 2010 film The Last Song after Cyrus recognized that it fit the film's concept well. According to Cyrus, when she sings "When I Look at You", she thinks of family and love. "It's kind of what this movie is all about", she said. The title track, "The Time of Our Lives", was composed by Dr. Luke, Kelly, Kesha Sebert (known as Kesha), and Pebe Sebert. Kesha co-wrote her contributions to "The Time of Our Lives" with the ideal of constructing a party anthem for young audiences, based on her first impression of Cyrus' personality; comedic and likable.

"Obsessed" was written by Roger Lavoie. Because the EP's production personnel did not understand it, the song was at first denied of inclusion. However, once "Obsessed" reached Cyrus, she continually insisted the track be included on the EP because she felt related to it. Cyrus described the song as depicting the emotions one feels when one cannot stop thinking of a person and believed it related to numerous fans having their first love. "It's a really romantic song", she concluded. "Before the Storm", originally released on the Jonas Brothers' fourth studio album Lines, Vines and Trying Times (2009), is included on The Time of Our Lives as a live rendition. The song was written by Nick Jonas, Joe Jonas, Kevin Jonas, and Cyrus. At first, the song was solely written by the Jonas Brothers for their third studio album A Little Bit Longer (2008), but did not make the final cut. Nick and Cyrus later reworked the song's lyrics to fit their past romance using a grand piano.

== Composition ==
"Party in the U.S.A." (2009)
Cyrus' "Party in the U.S.A." contains reggae elements. Its lyrics reflect her relocating from Nashville to Hollywood.

"Kicking and Screaming" is the most prominent representation of rock music on The Time of Our Lives. The track features instrumentation that relies on glam electric guitar riffing and ragged, gutsy vocals, which, at several points, feature a gravelly element. It results in an uptempo electronic rock number. Lyrically, "Kicking and Screaming" is a merciless message to an ex-boyfriend. "Party in the U.S.A." is a pop song with reggae elements while having instrumentation that includes a "clash between feathery jazz guitar chords and a booming synth bassline serving as a hook". Cyrus' vocals display an undertone of alternative country twang and features belter refrains. The lyrics for "Party in the U.S.A." discuss Cyrus' relocation from Nashville, Tennessee to Hollywood, California. The refrains mainly speak of how her favorite songs make her feel more confident. "When I Look at You" is a power ballad that transitions in instrumentation, from piano to electric guitar. Throughout the song, Cyrus keeps a hushed tone, but starts to belt soon before the arrival of the second verse. Lyrically, it speaks of a dream lover. "The Time of Our Lives" is a bouncy, dance-pop song characterized by 1980s synths and a fizzy sound caused by a bubblegum pop background. Cyrus' processed vocals display a prominent use of auto-tune; influences derive from new wave music. The song's lyrics talk about not worrying so much about the future and simply focusing on the present and having a good time together. "Talk Is Cheap" is a pop-punk, garage rock song with disco influences and a number of hooks. "Talk Is Cheap" features lyrics that speak of being extremely irritated after encountering predicaments at a club and others smoking cigarettes. "Obsessed" is a power ballad with soft rock characteristics and husky vocals. "Obsessed"'s lyrics deal with teenage lust. "Before the Storm" is a country pop ballad about a melancholic romantic breakup.

== Singles ==
"Party in the U.S.A." was released on August 11, 2009, as the lead single from The Time of Our Lives through digital distribution. It received praise from critics for its musical composition, reflecting aspects of R&B and catchy effect. "Party in the U.S.A." was also a commercial success for Cyrus; it charted within the top ten of eight countries. In the United States, the song peaked at number two, becoming Cyrus' best-charting single up to that point and the sixth best selling digital single of 2009. It was also deemed Hollywood Records' fastest and best-selling single to date. The single was certified thirteen-times Platinum by the Recording Industry Association of America (RIAA) and quadruple platinum by the Canadian Recording Industry Association (CRIA). A music video for "Party in the U.S.A.", directed by Chris Applebaum, was set mainly at a drive-in theater and pays tribute to the film Grease (1978) and Cyrus's parents' courting days.

"When I Look at You" was released to promote the film The Last Song, which Cyrus' starred in and became the EP's second and last single. "When I Look at You" received average to mixed critical reception, ranging from "inevitable hit single" to "inferior ballad", and was unable to duplicate the commercial success of "Party in the U.S.A." Its highest international peak was achieved in the United States, where it reached number sixteen, followed by Australia, where it peaked at number eighteen. The song's accompanying music video was directed by Adam Shankman. It features Cyrus playing a grand piano in several settings, including a beach and forest.

== Promotion ==
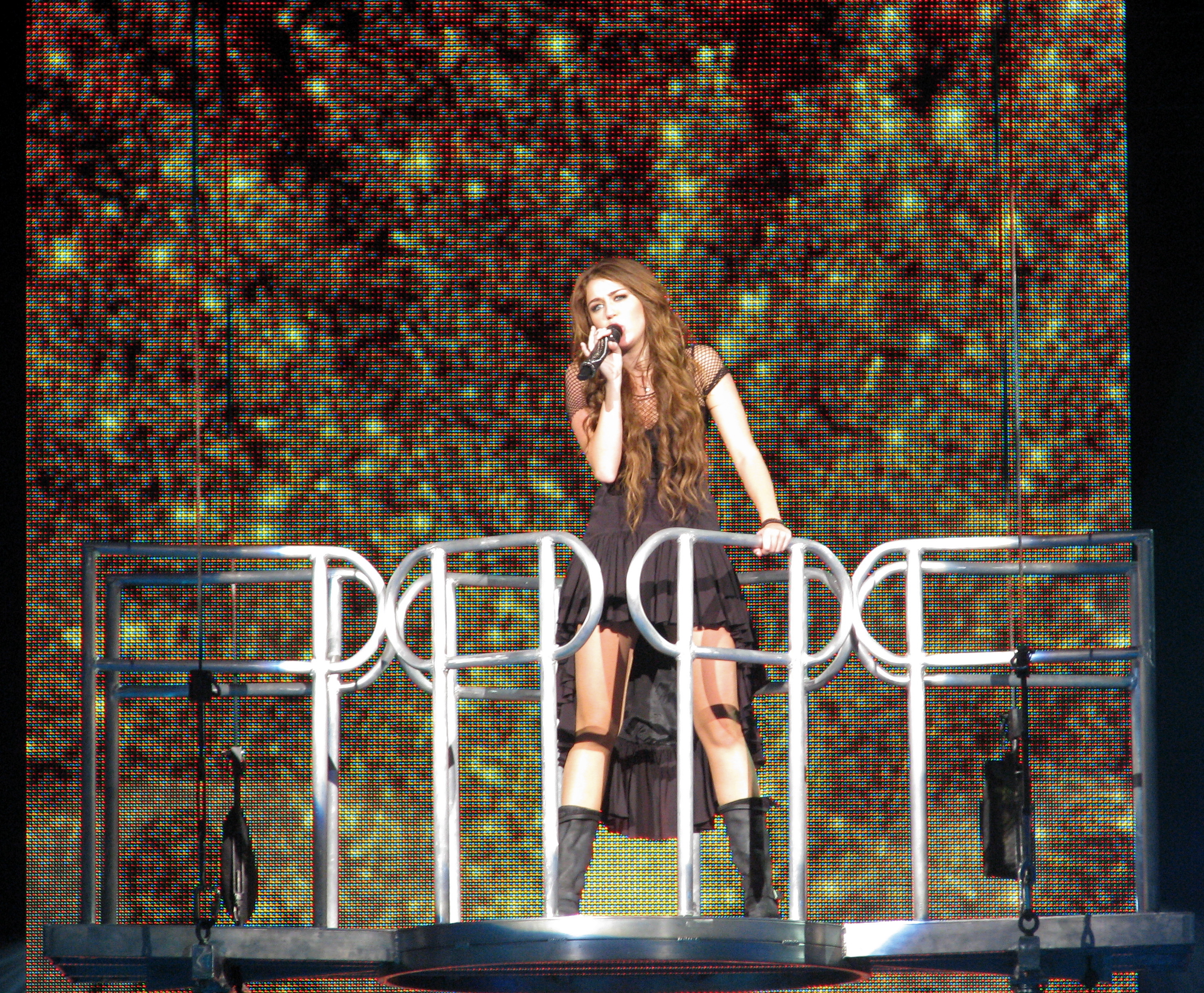
Cyrus performing "Obsessed" during the Wonder World Tour

Cyrus' first live performance of "Party in the U.S.A." was at the Teen Choice Awards held on August 10, 2009. Clothed in a tank top that revealed a portion of her bra, black hot pants, and leather boots, Cyrus and her backup dancers appeared from a trailer. Midway through the performance, Cyrus danced atop an ice cream cart with a pole (which was suggested to be a dance pole by numerous critics) for approximately forty seconds. The performance was met with a media uproar, with some critics suggesting that her dancing was too suggestive and sexual for a teen-oriented event, which caused The Walt Disney Company to issue a statement distancing themselves from the performance. Other critics came to Cyrus' defense, stating that viewers should have fixated on her accomplishments that night, winning six awards, rather than the sexuality of the performance. In continuation, Cyrus promoted the EP on The Today Show and VH1 Divas in the United States. In December, Cyrus undertook promotion in the United Kingdom at 95.8 Capital FM's Jingle Bell Ball, the Royal Variety Performance—the annual gala for the British royal family— and various other venues.

"The Time of Our Lives" was released for airplay, exclusively on Radio Disney, in order to promote the EP. "The Time of Our Lives" peaked at number twenty-three on the Bubbling Under Hot 100 Singles Chart (Billboard Hot 100 – 123) and at number fifty-one on the Canadian Hot 100. Cyrus embarked on her second concert tour, the Wonder World Tour, to promote The Time of Our Lives and her second studio album Breakout (2008). The tour was Cyrus's first to not have her costumed as Hannah Montana, and was announced in June 2009, with dates revealed for American venues. Dates for venues in the United Kingdom were later announced. In to order to avoid the extensive scalping that occurred during her previous tour, all tickets were sold exclusively through paperless ticket delivery, which required audiences to bring identification to gain entry into the concert. The tour expanded from September to December 2009.

== Critical reception ==
Professional ratings
Aggregate scores
| Source | Rating |
|---|---|
| Metacritic | 63/100 |
Review scores
| Source | Rating |
| About.com | 4/5 stars |
| AllMusic | 3.5/5 stars |
| Entertainment Weekly | B+ |
| Digital Spy | 4/5 stars |
| The Guardian | 2/5 stars |
| The Observer | Favorable |
| Yahoo! Music | 5/10 stars |

The Time of Our Lives received generally positive reviews, earning a collective score of 63 out of 100 on Metacritic. Bill Lamb of About.com said, "Cyrus is developing one of the more distinctive vocal instruments in current pop music, and her songs are turning slowly to reflective adult concerns. Consistent growth and improvement is the key here, and looks likely to turn Miley Cyrus into a long-term pop star." Lamb did, however, state that the ballads on The Time of Our Lives were throwaways. Heather Phares of AllMusic thought otherwise, saying that the EP's highlights came when Cyrus "lets her inner rock chick and ballad-singing diva come to the fore." Phares stated that "If Breakout began to establish Miley Cyrus as a singing star in her own right, free of Hannah Montana baggage, then this Walmart Exclusive EP is another confident step in that direction." Phares concluded that the EP was a good representation of Cyrus's vocal growth and presumed that her vocal abilities would enhance further as she grew into an adult. Mikeal Wood of Entertainment Weekly graded The Time of Lives a B+ because of its execution of various musical styles and genres.

Nick Levin of Digital Spy reviewed The Time of Our Lives, saying that, although not offering much original material, it did provide evidence that Cyrus could successfully dump her Disney Channel-affiliated image. He said that each of "the six genuinely new songs" are worth listening to, resulting in a worthwhile EP release. Michael Hann of The Guardian felt that Cyrus managed to project a very wholesome image of herself but argued that she did not succeed in convincing adult audiences there was anything else to her: "She has her name on plenty of inventive, imaginative and precisely calibrated examples of modern chart pop, songs that would have been noticed beyond her audience of young girls had they come from a more credible source". Jessica Holland of British newspaper The Observer wrote a favorable review of the EP, noting: "Still not yet 17, Miley doesn't need to worry about slipping yet." Jaime Gill of Yahoo! Music described the uptempo numbers on the EP as "brilliantly feisty skate pop" but described the record's ballads as tedious. Gill concluded that, if Cyrus were to take her music more seriously, instead of releasing albums in between various other projects, she might make a great pop album and stated that "As it is, The Time Of Our Lives is a great pop EP drowning in a sea of bilge."

== Commercial performance ==
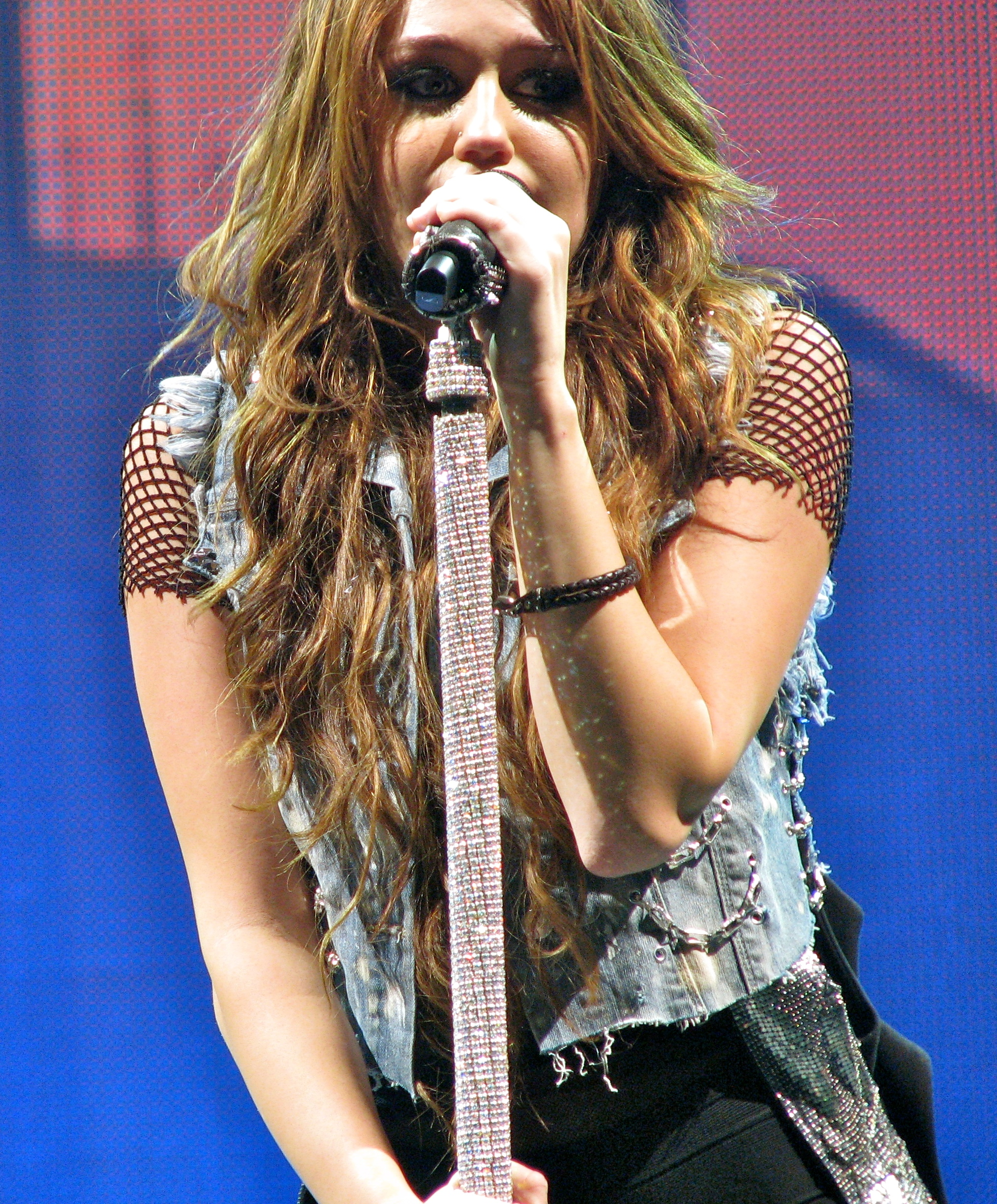
Cyrus performing "Party in the U.S.A." during the Wonder World Tour

On the week ending September 12, 2009, The Time of Our Lives entered the Billboard 200 at number three, selling a total of 62,000 copies and becoming Cyrus's eighth release to chart within the top ten. The EP peaked at number two in the following week due to a 154 percent increase in sales (153,000 copies sold). Spending another consecutive week at its peak, The Time of Our Lives continued to sell strongly throughout the remainder of 2009. On the week ending December 12, 2009, the EP experienced a sudden increase sales, rising from number twenty-nine to number seven with sales of 150,000 copies. The Time of Our Lives was certified three-times platinum by the Recording Industry Association of America (RIAA) for shipments of over three million copies. According to Nielsen SoundScan, the EP has sold 1.4 million copies in the United States as of July 2013. It debuted and peaked at number nine on the Canadian Albums Chart on the week ending January 30, 2010.

On the week ending November 11, 2009, the EP debuted and peaked at number eleven on the Australian Albums Chart. It later dropped to number thirteen and ascended and descended until its last week on the chart on May 18, 2010. The Time of Our Lives was certified gold by the Australian Recording Industry Association (ARIA) for shipments exceeding 35,000 copies. The Time of Our Lives entered the New Zealand Singles Chart at its peak of number nine. In the following week the EP dropped to number eleven, where it stayed for two consecutive weeks. It was certified gold by the Recording Industry Association of New Zealand (RIANZ) for shipments exceeding 7,500 copies. On the fourth week ending of January 2010, The Time of Our Lives debuted at number ten on the Japanese Albums Chart, selling an estimated 15,000 copies. In its second week on the chart, the EP descended to number nineteen.

On the week ending November 26, 2009, the EP debuted and peaked at number seventeen on the UK Albums Chart. The Time of Our Lives was certified gold by the British Phonographic Industry (BPI) for shipments of 100,000 copies. In Ireland, it peaked at number nine and was certified platinum by the Irish Recorded Music Association (IRMA) for shipments exceeding 15,000 copies. In mainland Europe, The Time of Our Lives peaked at number thirty-three on the European Top 100 Albums Chart, number five on the Austrian Albums Chart, number nine on the German Albums Chart, and number three on the Greek Albums Chart. On the week ending November 1, 2009, it debuted and peaked at number six in Spain, where it was also certified platinum by the Productores de Música de España (PROMUSICAE) for shipments of more than 60,000 copies. Elsewhere in Europe, the EP reached the top twenty of charts in the Czech Republic and Portugal.

== Track listing ==
The Time of Our Lives track listing
| No. | Title | Writer(s) | Producer(s) | Length |
|---|---|---|---|---|
| 1. | "Kicking and Screaming" | John Shanks; Kara DioGuardi | Shanks | 2:58 |
| 2. | "Party in the U.S.A." | Lukasz Gottwald; Claude Kelly; Jessica Cornish | Dr. Luke; Kelly^{[a]}; Emily Wright^{[a]} | 3:22 |
| 3. | "When I Look at You" | Shanks; Hillary Lindsey | Shanks | 4:09 |
| 4. | "The Time of Our Lives" | Gottwald; Kelly; Kesha Sebert; Pebe Sebert | Dr. Luke; Kelly^{[a]}; Wright^{[a]} | 3:32 |
| 5. | "Talk Is Cheap" | Shanks; Amy Lindop | Shanks | 3:40 |
| 6. | "Obsessed" | Roger Lavoie | Shanks | 4:04 |
| 7. | "Before the Storm" (live; with Jonas Brothers) | Nick Jonas; Joe Jonas; Kevin Jonas II; Miley Cyrus | John Zonars^{[b]}; John Fields^{[c]} | 4:35 |
| Total length: | | | | 26:20 |

International bonus track
| No. | Title | Writer(s) | Producer(s) | Length |
|---|---|---|---|---|
| 8. | "The Climb" | Jessi Alexander; Jon Mabe | Shanks | 3:55 |
| Total length: | | | | 30:15 |

=== Notes ===
- ^{^[a]}signifies a vocal producer
- ^{^[b]}signifies a live producer
- ^{^[c]}signifies an additional producer
- International iTunes Store deluxe edition includes the music videos of "The Climb", "When I Look at You", and "Party in the U.S.A.".
- Japanese deluxe edition includes a bonus DVD which contains the music videos of "Party in the U.S.A.", and "The Climb".
- "Kicking and Screaming" is a cover of the song by Ashlee Simpson, which was released in 2005.

== Credits and personnel ==
As listed in the liner notes.

- Jason Coons – audio mixing assistant (track 7)
- Jessica "Jessie J" Cornish – background vocals (track 2)
- Miley Cyrus – background vocals (tracks 1, 3, 5–6), lead vocals (All tracks)
- Tish Cyrus – executive producer
- John Fields – additional producer (track 7)
- Brian Gardener – mastering
- Şerban Ghenea – audio mixing (tracks 2, 4)
- Aniela Gottwald – assistant production coordinator (tracks 2, 4)
- Lukasz "Dr. Luke" Gottwald – background vocals (track 2), drums (2, 4), guitar (2, 4), keyboards (2, 4), music producer (2, 4), music programming (2, 4), vocal producer (2, 4)
- Tatiana Gottwald – assistant production coordinator
- Phil Hadaway – assistant production coordinator (tracks 2, 4)
- John Hanes – audio mixing engineer (tracks 2, 4)
- James "Hootsie" Huth – recording engineer (track 7)
- Joe Jonas – guest appearance (track 7)
- Kevin Jonas – guest appearance (track 7)

- Nick Jonas – guest appearance (track 7)
- Claude Kelly – background vocals, vocal producer (tracks 2, 4)
- Jon Lind – A&R
- Brian Reeves – audio mixing (track 7)
- Tim "Tom" Roberts – assistant mixing engineer (tracks 2, 4)
- Jeff Rothschild – recording engineer, audio mixing (tracks 1, 3, 5–6)
- Kesha Sebert – background vocals (track 4)
- John Shanks – producer (tracks 1, 3, 5–6)
- Shakur Green – producer
- Vanessa Silberman – assistant production coordinator (tracks 2, 4)
- Gary "G" Silver – production coordinator (track 2)
- Cindy Warden – A&R coordinator
- Emily Wright – recording engineer, vocal editing, vocal producer (tracks 2, 4)
- Douglas Wright – background vocals (track 2)
- John Zonars – recording engineer, live producer (track 7)

== Charts ==
=== Weekly charts ===
| Chart (2009–10) | Peak position |
|---|---|
| Argentinean Albums Chart | 18 |
| Australian Albums Chart | 11 |
| Austrian Albums Chart | 5 |
| Belgian Albums Chart (Flanders) | 74 |
| Belgian Albums Chart (Wallonia) | 42 |
| Canadian Albums Chart | 9 |
| Czech Albums Chart | 15 |
| European Top 100 Albums | 33 |
| French Albums Chart | 36 |
| German Albums Chart | 9 |
| Greek Albums Chart | 3 |
| Hungarian Albums Chart | 22 |
| Irish Albums Chart | 9 |
| Italian Albums Chart | 32 |
| Japanese Albums Chart | 10 |
| Mexican Albums Chart | 24 |
| New Zealand Albums Chart | 9 |
| Norway Albums Chart | 33 |
| Polish Albums Chart | 32 |
| Portuguese Albums Chart | 16 |
| Spanish Albums Chart | 6 |
| Swiss Albums Chart | 23 |
| UK Albums Chart | 17 |
| US Billboard 200 | 2 |

=== Year-end charts ===
| Chart (2009) | Position |
|---|---|
| Australian Albums Chart | 81 |
| Austrian Albums Chart | 71 |
| French Albums Chart | 136 |
| Hungarian Albums (MAHASZ) | 94 |
| New Zealand Albums Chart | 36 |
| Spanish Albums Chart | 25 |
| UK Albums Chart | 148 |
| US Billboard 200 | 34 |
| Chart (2010) | Position |
| European Top 100 Albums | 80 |
| French Albums Chart | 188 |
| Spanish Albums Chart | 47 |
| US Billboard 200 | 38 |

== Certifications ==
| Region | Certification | Certified units/sales |
|---|---|---|
| Australia (ARIA) | Gold | 35,000^{^} |
| Austria (IFPI Austria) | Gold | 10,000^{*} |
| Denmark (IFPI Danmark) | Gold | 10,000^{‡} |
| France (SNEP) | Gold | 50,000^{*} |
| Germany (BVMI) | Gold | 100,000^{^} |
| Hungary (MAHASZ) | Gold | 3,000^{^} |
| Ireland (IRMA) | Platinum | 15,000^{^} |
| New Zealand (RMNZ) | 2× Platinum | 30,000^{‡} |
| Singapore (RIAS) | Gold | 5,000^{*} |
| Spain (Promusicae) | Platinum | 80,000^{^} |
| United Kingdom (BPI) | Gold | 100,000^{^} |
| United States (RIAA) | 3× Platinum | 3,000,000^{‡} |
^{*} Sales figures based on certification alone.^{^} Shipments figures based on certification alone.^{‡} Sales+streaming figures based on certification alone.
