= Miley Cyrus & Her Dead Petz =

2015 studio album by Miley Cyrus

Studio album by Miley Cyrus
- Released: August 30, 2015
- Recorded: 2014–2015
- Studios: Pink Floor Studios (Oklahoma City, OK); Love Yer Brain Studios; Kung Fu Gardens (North Hollywood, CA)
- Genres: Experimental; psychedelic; psychedelic pop; psychedelic rock
- Length: 92:05
- Labels: Smiley Miley; RCA
- Producers: Miley Cyrus; The Flaming Lips; Oren Yoel; Mike Will Made-It

Miley Cyrus chronology
Bangerz (2013)	Miley Cyrus & Her Dead Petz (2015)	Younger Now (2017)

Miley Cyrus & Her Dead Petz is the fifth studio album by American singer-songwriter Miley Cyrus. It was surprise released independently to SoundCloud on August 30, 2015, and later released commercially to digital music stores and music streaming services by RCA Records on April 10, 2017. Cyrus began planning this album before releasing her fourth album Bangerz (2013), and befriended the Flaming Lips while she continued working on the album in 2014. In addition to the psychedelic rock band, Cyrus worked with producers Mike Will Made It and Oren Yoel (with whom she had collaborated on Bangerz). The album features guest vocals by Big Sean (who had appeared on Bangerz), Sarah Barthel of Phantogram and Ariel Pink.

Without previous promotion, Cyrus announced that Miley Cyrus & Her Dead Petz was available for free online streaming when she hosted the 2015 MTV Video Music Awards, released independently. Critics were divided in their opinions of the album; some applauded Cyrus' ambition and experimentation, and others considered its production and overall finish lacking. Cyrus promoted the album with music videos for "Dooo It!", "Lighter" and "BB Talk", and performances of "Karen Don't Be Sad" and "Twinkle Song" when she hosted Saturday Night Live. Additionally, she embarked on her fifth and short concert tour, the Milky Milky Milk Tour between November and December 2015.

== Background and production ==
On my last record, everything we did was with computers. But [the Flaming Lips are] real musicians – they can change keys on a whim. I've never seen anything like it. They've had me on this journey that's greater than anything I've been on. It's really deep.

— Cyrus, describing her artistic transition during the album's production

On October 4, 2013, after the release of Bangerz, Cyrus announced that she was working on a follow-up album. She said, "I'm already at a different time than I was when I finished [Bangerz]" and was so removed from daily life because of her career that "I need something to work for". In an interview to The New York Times, Cyrus explained the personal evolution, including death and love as she'd never known, that led to this project. First came the killing in April 2014 of her beloved dog, Floyd, by coyotes while she was touring for Bangerz. Two weeks later, after bawling through some performances, Cyrus was hospitalized for more than a week in Kansas with a severe allergic reaction to antibiotics. There she was visited by Wayne Coyne, long one of her musical heroes, with whom she had recently begun collaborating.

Cyrus befriended Coyne and his band, the Flaming Lips; they joined her for performances during her Bangerz Tour, and Cyrus recorded cover versions of the Beatles' "Lucy in the Sky with Diamonds" and "A Day in the Life" for the Flaming Lips' 2014 fifteenth studio album With a Little Help from My Fwends. Fascinated by their live instrumentation and its contrast with Bangerz' computerized elements, Cyrus began writing material with the Flaming Lips for her then-untitled fifth studio album in May 2014 and expected to finish it after the Bangerz Tour later that year. Producer Mike Will Made It, who collaborated with Cyrus on Bangerz, hinted in July that they were working on a new project and said in December that they had recorded six unfinished tracks for her record. That year, Cyrus severed creative ties with producer Dr. Luke to pursue a "different direction musically", and punk rock singer Kathleen Hanna offered to help her with a record "only [Cyrus is] daring enough to make".

== Composition ==
=== Music genres ===
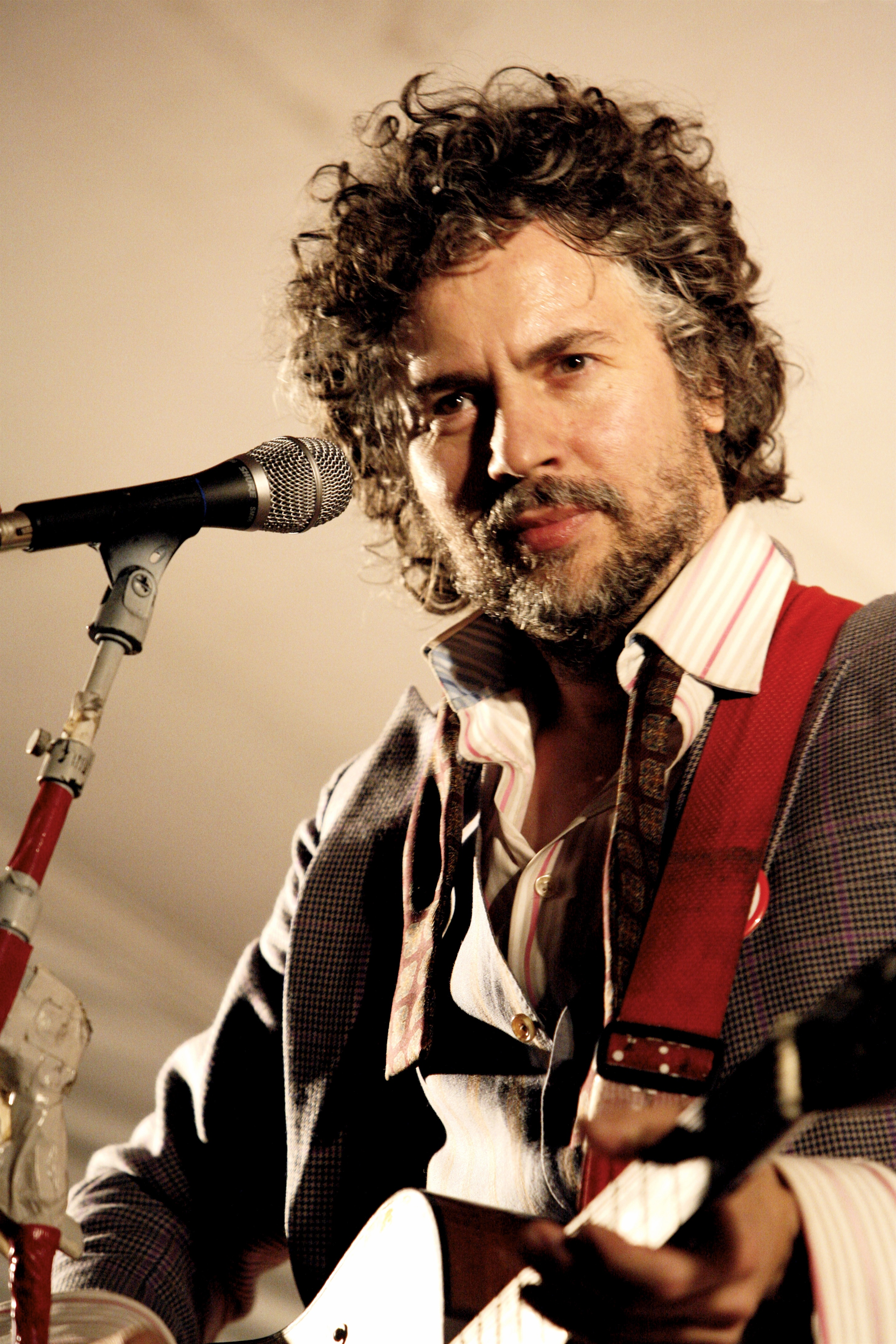
Wayne Coyne (pictured) influenced the production of Miley Cyrus & Her Dead Petz.

In its early conceptual stages, Cyrus called Miley Cyrus & Her Dead Petz "a little psychedelic, but still in that pop world". Mike Will Made It described it as "like country Lana Del Rey backed by a choir, except it's Miley pouring her heart out". The album is experimental, psychedelic, psychedelic pop, and psychedelic rock with elements of alternative pop, synth-pop, art pop, and space rock.

=== Songs and lyrical content ===
The first half of Miley Cyrus & Her Dead Petz has "a healthy dose of the [Flaming Lips]' warm guitars and uniquely unsettling approach to melody"; in its second half, the band's "organic approach" is integrated with the "throbbing computer [pop]" of Mike Will Made It's production. Jason Lipshutz of Billboard interpreted the album's drug and sexual references as Cyrus' way of "addressing the parents put off by her twerk-happy antics during her Bangerz run: You ain't seen nothin' yet!" "Dooo It!" incorporates elements of hip hop and trap music as Cyrus sings, "Yeah, I smoke pot / yeah, I love peace / but I don't give a fuck / I ain't no hippie" in a style called reminiscent of "M.I.A.'s abrasive bravado". "Karen Don't Be Sad" is a "hazy ballad" that has been described as a "lost track from Yoshimi Battles the Pink Robots." "The Floyd Song (Sunrise)" was written after the April 2014 death of Cyrus' dog, Floyd, while she was on the Bangerz Tour. The combination of "acoustic guitar, zapping electronics and warm synth pads" has been said to make Cyrus' vocals sound like she is "fronting a Flaming Lips cover band".

Like "Karen Don't Be Sad", the acoustic "Something About Space Dude" has been compared to material from the Flaming Lips' Yoshimi Battles the Pink Robots (2002). In "Space Bootz", Cyrus expresses affection for a love interest who is "emotionally unavailable", with a more "cosmic-pop" production and "interstellar whooshes and synths" than the lyrically similar "Something About Space Dude". "Fuckin Fucked Up" is a witch house-inspired interlude before "BB Talk"; in "BB Talk" Cyrus expresses distaste for public displays of affection from a love interest and a desire for him to "fuck [her] so [he stops] baby talking." The "swaying, stoney, piano-based" "Fweaky" describes a sexual encounter after drinking and using drugs. "Bang Me Box", a "raunchy electro R&B" song, expresses an explicit desire for lesbian sex.

Cyrus sings the tenth song, "Milky Milky Milk", in a "robotic" voice over a "wiggy synth" beat. It shares the lyrics "I feel like a slab of butter / that is melting in the sun / oppression melts away / now that you and me are one" with the next track, "Slab of Butter (Scorpion)", which features Sarah Barthel of Phantogram. The "'80s robo-funk" interlude "I'm So Drunk" precedes "I Forgive Yiew", with its elements of "cartoonish funk-hop." "I Get So Scared" is a "soulful" number about moving on from a former love interest, and "Lighter" combines a Cyndi Lauper-esque vocal style with "percolating '80s pop" experimentation. "Tangerine" is a "spacey, acid dipped slow burner", with a verse by rapper Big Sean in the middle, followed by the chime-heavy "Tiger Dreams" with Ariel Pink as a background vocalist. The eighteenth track, "Evil Is But a Shadow", was compared to Portishead; when heard with "Tangerine" and "Tiger Dreams", it has "druggy" and "hypnotic" elements.

In "Cyrus Skies", Cyrus sings "I’ve been alive but I’ve been a liar" in an exaggerated manner over an "opulent pop" beat that "comes off like a horror movie Lana Del Rey." "1 Sun" has been called a "Lady Gaga-Sky Ferreira hybrid" with an "industrial-electro-tinged" production and environmentally-conscious lyrics reminiscent of "Wake Up America" from Cyrus' second studio album, Breakout (2008). According to Cyrus, she "passive aggressively" included "Miley Tibetan Bowlzzz" on the album as a demonstration of artistic control and independence when her team expressed concern that the album might be "too long". Her father, Billy Ray Cyrus, recorded her playing the Tibetan bowls; she "[wanted] people to listen all the way through just once, because it’s a nice story". "Pablow the Blowfish" is a piano-based ballad addressing Cyrus' grief for her pet fish, with "silly" and "endearing" lyrics (including "watching my friends eat my friends ruined my appetite", referring to a sushi outing). Miley Cyrus & Her Dead Petz closes with "Twinkle Song", inspired by the death of her friend's cat; Cyrus' vocal begins in a "controlled country-ballad voice" which becomes "powerful yelling."

== Release ==
At the 2014 MTV Video Music Awards, Cyrus said that Miley Cyrus & Her Dead Petz (untitled at the time) "might take me five years" to finish: "I'll just work on it until I'm done". According to the singer, the album is "about music [and is] not about twerking". In January 2015, Cyrus expressed her intention "to get this stuff out ASAP", adding that she was working on the album nearly every day. Although Bangerz cost "a couple million" dollars to produce, Miley Cyrus & Her Dead Petz cost about $50,000; she said that RCA Records, her label, did not hear the final product until she completed it. The album does not count towards her multi-album recording contract with the label, but RCA said: "Miley Cyrus continues to be a groundbreaking artist. She has a strong point of view regarding her art and expressed her desire to share this body of work with her fans directly. RCA Records is pleased to support Miley's unique musical vision".

Cyrus mentioned that the possibility of a free album in an August 2015 Marie Claire interview, with her manager adding that the singer was "prepared to buy herself out of the label" if RCA Records did not cooperate with her plan. That month, Cyrus was reportedly working on two albums simultaneously and considered releasing her project with the Flaming Lips for free. On the red carpet for the 2015 MTV Video Music Awards on August 30 (which she hosted), she said: "It's been kind of the most magical week of my life ... It feels like Christmas". Cyrus closed the show with a previously unannounced performance of "Dooo It!" with Coyne, before telling the audience that Miley Cyrus & Her Dead Petz was available for free online streaming. Vinyl pressings of the record were announced in October 2015, but minimal were released. In April 2017, the album was officially uploaded to iTunes and paid music subscription services like Apple Music and Spotify, after only being available for free on SoundCloud for almost 2 years.

=== Reaction ===
Dan Weiss of Spin found that the most interesting aspect of Miley Cyrus & Her Dead Petz was RCA Records' willingness to let Cyrus release the material outside her recording contract: "Before the era of the surprise free album, record companies would refuse to release an uncommercial record, or let it choke to death without promotion". According to Weiss, the label supported Cyrus' launch strategy when it determined that none of the material "was worth fighting Big Miley LLC over". Chris DeVille of Stereogum said, "After a second straight year dotted by surprise drops by everyone from Drake to Death Grips to Miley Cyrus and the Flaming Lips" (after Beyoncé's self-titled fifth studio album in 2013), the practice ran the risk of becoming "standard". DeVille questioned the accuracy of the word "surprise", when the projects' existence had been extensively discussed by the media before their release.

Joe Coscarelli wrote for The New York Times that, given the success and duration of her career, Cyrus earned the privilege of "[debuting] a different, decidedly noncommercial version of herself" and her "performative, post-Disney, anything-goes ethos is more than a retail strategy – it's her all-encompassing aesthetic and lifestyle". Coscarelli also stated that "whereas Bangerz saw a freshly unfettered pop renegade experimenting with her newfound power — roiling some with its hip-hop tourism and provocative visuals — the id-heavy experiments of Dead Petz reveal Miley as she exists now: aware of her position as a youth-culture spokeswoman, and openly keen on drugs, sex, animals and the environment". John Mayer called the album "a masterwork of whack genius" on Twitter, praising Cyrus' demonstration that "you can be one artist one year and the next discover some crazy light inside yourself and shine it everywhere". Elton John commended the singer for her unorthodox collaboration with the Flaming Lips, which he called the "spur of the moment, out of leftfield stuff ... that would have happened during the '60s". Father John Misty's J. Tillman placed the album tenth on his list of ten favorite albums of 2015.

=== Promotion ===
Before the announcement of Miley Cyrus & Her Dead Petz, Cyrus sang "Twinkle Song" at Art Basel in Miami Beach, Florida on December 7, 2014. She and the Flaming Lips introduced "Tiger Dreams" during the Adult Swim upfront party at Terminal 5 in New York City on May 13, 2015. After the album's release, Cyrus was the host and musical guest for the 41st-season premiere of Saturday Night Live on October 3. She and the Flaming Lips were introduced by U.S. presidential candidate Hillary Clinton for their performance of "Karen Don't Be Sad" in animal onesies; Cyrus "[stood] before the microphone wearing a blond beehive made of dreadlocks, tangled with string and sparkling things". She soloed on "Twinkle Song" for the second performance, where she "[sat] down at a piano covered in photos of animals [and] small blue lights"; the performance ended with Cyrus "in tears [and] her voice breaking". That night she announced her Miley Cyrus & Her Dead Petz Tour (later renamed the Milky Milky Milk Tour), which visited eight North American clubs in November and December. The Flaming Lips performed "Karen Don't Be Sad" and "Tiger Dreams" during an impromptu performance at the Observatory in Santa Ana, California on October 12; Wayne Coyne sang the lead vocal, explaining that Cyrus was "at home".

Music videos for "Dooo It!", "Lighter" and "BB Talk" were released on August 31, November 21 and December 11, respectively. After the video premiered, "Dooo It!" and "BB Talk" charted at 60th and 86th place on the Billboard Canadian Hot 100. However, these three songs weren't released as a single from the album.

== Critical reception ==
Professional ratings
Aggregate scores
Source	Rating
AnyDecentMusic?	6.0/10
Metacritic	60/100
Review scores
Source	Rating
AllMusic	3.5/5 stars
The A.V. Club	C
Billboard	3/5 stars
Consequence of Sound	C−
DIY	3/5 stars
Entertainment Weekly	A−
New York Daily News	3/5 stars
NME	4/5 stars
Pitchfork	3.0/10
Rolling Stone	3.5/5 stars

Miley Cyrus & Her Dead Petz received mixed reviews from music critics. At Metacritic, which assigns a normalized rating out of 100 to reviews from mainstream critics, Miley Cyrus & Her Dead Petz received an average score of 60 ("mixed or average reviews") based on 21 reviews. According to Kyle Anderson of Entertainment Weekly, the project saw Cyrus "pulling 'a reverse Liz Phair' in that she [started] with the glossy pop stuff and [ended] up producing something as intense and naked as Exile in Guyville"; the record represented a "distillation of an artist’s soul that is both rare and wonderful". He noted that "Dead Petz is a remarkable accomplishment because Cyrus appears to have grasped all of her potential at once", highlighting the album's varied sound and influence. Nick Levine of NME wrote that "1 Sun" and "I Get So Scared" were lyrically similar to Cyrus' earlier "Wake Up America" and "Adore You", which made the new album "[feel] like a wonderfully unexpected progression" instead of a "contrived bid for credibility". Rob Sheffield called "Something About Space Dude" an album highlight in Rolling Stone, citing the line "our lips get me so wet / while I'm singing all the verses from the Tibetan Book of the Dead" from "Milky Milky Milk" as the project's best, although Cyrus attempted several "Coyne-like high notes that don't suit her lowdown voice".

In a mixed review, Annie Zaleski of The A.V. Club called the 92-minute album's unrefined production a "slog to get through", although it was "commendable for its devil-may-care bravery". According to Jason Lipshutz of Billboard, the album should be enjoyed "as the work of an artist who ... will not be bound to the post-teen pop stardom she inherited less than two years ago"; although portions were "unlistenable", the overall project was "messy, imperfect, provocative and entertaining". In DIY, Kyle Macneill wrote that the tracks alternated between success and failure, praising Cyrus' "gigantic foam finger to industry constraints" and describing the album as "a dazzling insight into the twinkling mind of one of pop's biggest stars".

Jim Faber of the New York Daily News wrote that Cyrus' vocals sounded like "they were recorded through a bong"; the album "could use a hefty dose of editing" and was "annoying to any listener". According to Dan Weiss of Spin, "the total lack of unpredictability ... is what betrays Cyrus' true lack of imagination" and he raised the possibility of an "all-time backlash" she might experience if her return to the mainstream market "doesn't woo radio". Sasha Geffen wrote in Consequence of Sound that the album "is a huge mess, but at least it's an honest one"; Pitchfork's Meaghan Garvey criticized Cyrus for releasing "the definition of a vanity project". The album was ranked 10th, 25th and 42nd, respectively, on Entertainment Weekly's, Time Out London's and NME's lists of the best albums of 2015.

=== Year-end lists ===
Publication	List	Rank	Ref.
Entertainment Weekly	40 Best Albums of 2015	10	
Popjustice	Top 33 Albums of 2015	24	
Time Out London	50 Best Albums of 2015	25	
NME	Top 50 Albums of 2015	42	
Variance	50 Best Albums of 2015	50	
Crack Magazine	Best Albums of 2015	100	

== Impact ==
"Forgotten as quickly as it arrived, Dead Petz may also have predicted today's brisk, ephemeral post-album landscape."

— Tatiana Cirisiano of Billboard

The surprise release of Miley Cyrus & Her Dead Petz caused mixed reactions among critics and fans, but Cyrus was praised for her pursuit of artistic freedom. Some critics applauded Cyrus's choice to release the record for free online outside her multi-album contract with RCA Records. Billboard's Tatiana Cirisiano said Cyrus made "a bold and potentially lethal move for any artist today, let alone a pop star in 2015". The project was recognized for "asserting that pop stars, too, should be afforded the freedom to experiment with one-offs - while they certainly can use the 'era' model if it serves their artistry best, not every release must connote the beginning of a heavily-promoted album cycle and matching persona". Dead Petz has been considered "a predecessor of today's rule-breaking, tradition-flipping pop scene".

Nolan Feeney from Time called the project "one of the most prominent surprise releases" since Beyoncé's 2013 self-titled album. The journalist noted: "Cyrus does the musical equivalent of pivoting away from the cameras' gaze in search of something more fulfilling. The songs may not satisfy listeners the same way, but the process behind them is fascinating to watch. Even when Cyrus isn't demanding our attention, she manages to hold it anyway". Writing for Consequence Of Sound, Sasha Geffen said: "if the world’s still looking — and Cyrus made sure they were looking — why not give them something to look at? Dead Petz succeeds as a spectacle, even if it collapses under the weight of its own irreverence".

In her review for Pitchfork, Meaghan Garvey wrote: "In a way, Dead Petz is a fascinating milemarker of pop music in the post-album, post-Internet era: a major pop album that lands with a splash, then sinks like a brick, as ephemeral as the Tumblr culture Cyrus draws from. Maybe that’s the most visionary aspect of Dead Petz: it feels like it was built to disintegrate." Reviewing the album for NME, Nick Levine said that it was "the weirdest album made by a massive pop star in recent memory" and "an essential listen". Miley Cyrus & Her Dead Petz helped Cyrus earn a nomination for Outstanding Music Artist at the 2016 GLAAD Media Awards. The album has been applauded by musicians Troye Sivan, Anthony Green, Courtney Act, and Charli XCX. In 2025, on Pitchfork's My Perfect 10 social media series singer Cobrah chose Miley Cyrus & Her Dead Petz as the record she gives a 10 score.

== Track listing ==
Miley Cyrus & Her Dead Petz track listing
No.	Title	Writer(s)	Producer(s)	Length
1.	"Dooo It!"	Miley Cyrus; Wayne Coyne; Steven Drozd; Dennis Coyne	Cyrus; The Flaming Lips; D. Coyne^{[a]}; Dave Fridmann^{[a]}	3:38
2.	"Karen Don't Be Sad"	Cyrus; W. Coyne; Drozd	Cyrus; The Flaming Lips; D. Coyne^{[a]}; Fridmann^{[a]}	4:52
3.	"The Floyd Song (Sunrise)"	Cyrus; Drozd; W. Coyne; D. Coyne	Cyrus; The Flaming Lips; D. Coyne^{[a]}; Fridmann^{[a]}	5:16
4.	"Something About Space Dude"	Cyrus; W. Coyne; Derek Brown; Drozd; D. Coyne	Cyrus; The Flaming Lips; D. Coyne^{[a]}; Fridmann^{[a]}	3:28
5.	"Space Bootz"	Cyrus	Oren Yoel; Cyrus^{[b]}	4:39
6.	"Fuckin Fucked Up"	Cyrus; D. Coyne	Cyrus; The Flaming Lips; D. Coyne^{[a]}; Fridmann^{[a]}	0:50
7.	"BB Talk"	Cyrus	Yoel; The Flaming Lips^{[b]}; Cyrus^{[b]}	4:32
8.	"Fweaky"	Cyrus	Mike Will Made It; A+^{[c]}	3:47
9.	"Bang Me Box"	Cyrus	Mike Will Made It; Resource^{[c]}	3:41
10.	"Milky Milky Milk"	Cyrus; W. Coyne; Drozd; D. Coyne	Cyrus; The Flaming Lips; D. Coyne^{[a]}; Fridmann^{[a]}	4:47
11.	"Slab of Butter (Scorpion)" (featuring Sarah Barthel)	Cyrus; W. Coyne; Drozd; D. Coyne	Mike Will Made It; Cyrus; The Flaming Lips; Ryder Ripps^{[c]}; Jon Baken^{[c]}; Josh Knapp^{[c]}; Fridmann^{[a]}; Barthel^{[a]}	5:01
12.	"I'm So Drunk"	Cyrus	Cyrus; The Flaming Lips; D. Coyne^{[a]}; Fridmann^{[a]}	0:46
13.	"I Forgive Yiew"	Cyrus; Sam Hook	Mike Will Made It; Ripps^{[c]}; Baken^{[c]}; Knapp^{[c]}	3:14
14.	"I Get So Scared"	Cyrus	Yoel	3:53
15.	"Lighter"	Cyrus	Mike Will Made It; A+^{[c]}	5:19
16.	"Tangerine" (featuring Big Sean)	Cyrus; Drozd; W. Coyne; D. Coyne; Sean Anderson	Cyrus; The Flaming Lips; D. Coyne^{[a]}; Fridmann^{[a]}	5:05
17.	"Tiger Dreams" (featuring Ariel Pink)	Cyrus; Drozd; W. Coyne	Cyrus; The Flaming Lips; D. Coyne^{[a]}; Fridmann^{[a]}	5:52
18.	"Evil Is but a Shadow"	Cyrus; W. Coyne; Drozd; Brown; D. Coyne	Cyrus; The Flaming Lips; D. Coyne^{[a]}; Fridmann^{[a]}	4:35
19.	"Cyrus Skies"	Cyrus; Drozd; W. Coyne	Cyrus; The Flaming Lips; D. Coyne^{[a]}; Fridmann^{[a]}	5:33
20.	"1 Sun"	Cyrus	Yoel	3:59
21.	"Miley Tibetan Bowlzzz"	Cyrus; Drozd	The Flaming Lips	2:09
22.	"Pablow the Blowfish"	Cyrus	Cyrus	3:30
23.	"Twinkle Song"	Cyrus	Cyrus	3:43
Total length:				92:06

=== Notes ===
- ^{^[a]}Additional production
- ^{^[b]}Vocal producer
- ^{^[c]}Co-producer
- First uploaded version on SoundCloud had "Cyrus Skies" at track 11, as well as "Miley Tibetan Bowlzzz" and "Pablow the Blowfish" switched. It was updated to the current tracklist later.

== Personnel ==
Credits adapted from Cyrus' website.

- A+ – producer
- Jon Baken – producer
- Sarah Barthel – producer
- Dennis Coyne – mixing, recording, producer
- Billy Ray Cyrus – recording
- Miley Cyrus – vocals, piano, Tibetan bowls, keyboards, executive producer, mixing, producer, recording
- Doron Dina – mixing
- The Flaming Lips – mixing, producer, recording
- Luis Flores – assisting
- Dave Fridmann – mixing, producer
- Mike Fridmann – assisting
- Darryle Gayle – assisting
- Paul David Hager – mixing, sound engineering
- Steve "The Sauce" Hybicki – mixing
- Josh Knapp – producer
- Dave Kutch – mastering
- Randy Lanphear – assistance
- Mike Will Made It – producer, recording
- Resource – producer
- Ryder Ripps – producer
- Sean Tallman – mixing
- Oren Yoel – instrumentation, mixing, producer, programming

== Release history ==
List of release dates, showing region, formats, labels and references.
Region	Date	Format(s)	Label(s)	Ref.
Various	August 30, 2015	Streaming (SoundCloud exclusive)	Smiley Miley; RCA	
Various	April 10, 2017	Digital download; streaming	RCA	
