= Graduation2020 =

Virtual broadcast

#Graduation2020: Facebook and Instagram Celebrate the Class of 2020 was a special virtual broadcast by Facebook and Instagram on May 15, 2020. It aired during the COVID-19 pandemic, which had led to the general cancellation of in-person school graduation ceremonies. The special had various celebrities make commencement speeches and performances by various singers and high school/college choirs and bands.

The special was hosted by Mindy Kaling and B. J. Novak. Oprah Winfrey delivered the featured commencement address. Awkwafina, Jennifer Garner, Lil Nas X, and Simone Biles also delivered speeches during the broadcast.

Throughout it, every high school and college was listed by their respective state in alphabetical order, while showcasing various students' photos from Instagram and comments from Facebook. Teachers and families gave shoutouts as well.
