= The Climb (song) =

2009 single by Miley Cyrus

Single by Miley Cyrus

from the album Hannah Montana: The Movie
- Released: March 5, 2009
- Genre: Country pop; country rock
- Length: 3:54
- Label: Hollywood; Walt Disney
- Songwriters: Jessi Alexander; Jon Mabe
- Producer: John Shanks

Miley Cyrus singles chronology
| "Fly on the Wall" (2008) | "The Climb" (2009) | "Let's Get Crazy" (2009) |

Music video
- "The Climb" on YouTube

"The Climb" is a song recorded by American singer Miley Cyrus, for the 2009 film Hannah Montana: The Movie. The song was written by Jessi Alexander and Jon Mabe, and produced by John Shanks. It was released on March 5, 2009, as the lead single from the film's soundtrack by Walt Disney Records, and is also included as a bonus track on the international release of The Time of Our Lives. The song is a power ballad with lyrics that describe life as a difficult but rewarding journey. It is styled as a country pop ballad, and was Cyrus' first solo song to be released to country radio. The instrumentation includes piano, guitar, and violins.

The song was nominated for Best Song Written for a Motion Picture, Television, or Other Visual Media at the 52nd Annual Grammy Awards; however, the song was withdrawn from consideration by Walt Disney Records because it had not been written specifically for a film as the category's eligibility rules required. The song became a top-ten single on charts in Australia, Canada, Norway, and the United States. In the United States, it peaked at number four on the Billboard Hot 100 and became the eighth-best selling digital single of 2009. Five months after its release, the single was certified triple platinum by the Recording Industry Association of America. As of 2025, the single has been certified septuple platinum in both the US and Australia.

The song's accompanying music video was directed by Matthew Rolston, and depicts scenes of Cyrus climbing a mountain or singing, intercut with clips of Hannah Montana: The Movie. Cyrus promoted the song with several live performances. Cyrus performed the song as the closing number of her Wonder World Tour. The song was also performed during her Gypsy Heart Tour. "The Climb" has been covered by several artists and was the most popular choice of song among auditioners for the ninth season of the American singing contest, American Idol, with Hollie Cavanagh performing it in the top six of the eleventh season. Simon Cowell, creator of the British television talent show The X Factor, chose "The Climb" to be the debut single of the winner of the competition's sixth series. Winner Joe McElderry's cover, released on December 14, 2009, by Syco Music, was produced by Quiz & Larossi and topped the Irish Singles Chart and the UK Singles Chart.

Before its official release, the song was premiered at Kids Inaugural: "We Are the Future" event on January 19, 2009.

== Background ==
"The Climb" was not intentionally written for the 2009 musical film Hannah Montana: The Movie. Co-writer Jessi Alexander conceived the song's melody while driving to the home of songwriting partner Jon Mabe. Once she arrived, Mabe and her developed a song about overcoming life's obstacles inspired by their personal struggles in the music industry. Alexander referred to the process as a form of "therapy" and recalled,

"I was just driving to work one day. It's just a typical day, nothing really special about that day. And I just had this melody in my head. And I couldn't get to my co-writer Jon Mabe or my guitar fast enough because I just wanted to play what I was hearing. And, you know, we just kinda put it down pretty fast and didn't really think anything about it. The lyrics kinda started to come, I think for both of us, being kinda underdogs in the business. My co-writer was a songplugger, just turned songwriter, and I'd had record deals and ups and downs in the music business. I think for both of us, we just came from a place of, you know, 'it's not a race'."

The song they created was titled "It's the Climb" and was written in the third person. Alexander described the original song as "more spiritual" than the version that was released, and said it contained lines about prayer. However, she claimed she knew it was pop and suitable for the Walt Disney Company.

Before reaching Cyrus, the song had been rejected by several country artists. It was eventually picked up by Peter Chelsom, director of Hannah Montana: The Movie, who gave it to Cyrus to record for the film. Chelsom found what would become "The Climb" while visiting Nashville, Tennessee, during a quest to find 11 new songs for the movie. After hearing Alexander's music, Chelsom asked her to submit songs for consideration. Alexander recorded "It's the Climb" on a CD and gave it to him. Several weeks later, Chelsom called to say, "the song was gonna be an integral part of the movie". However, he wanted Mabe and Alexander to rework some of the song's content and to change the song from third person to first person. Alexander felt the changes amounted to a "substantial amount of the song" and commented, "For me, when you change something from third person to first person, it can change the whole meaning of a line." Mabe and her "wrestl[ed] over taking words out" and how much they could change while maintaining the song's integrity. After a number of drafts, Mabe and Alexander finally created a version they felt was "perfect for the movie".

Upon receiving the final draft, filmmakers told the songwriters, "This is perfect for Miley, it's gonna change her life, gonna change your life." Chelsom commented that the song "turned up" the film's music level by tapping into Cyrus's newfound vocal range. As with the other songs featured in Hannah Montana: The Movie, the song is "tightly woven into the fabric of the story and the characters". In the film, Cyrus plays Miley Stewart, a character with a secret double life as superstar Hannah Montana. Keeping this secret causes trouble between Miley and many of the other characters in the film, and leaves Miley confused and contrite. She expresses her emotions by writing "The Climb". According to film producer Alfred Gough, "The song is her journey, the lessons she's learned in the movie. It's an epic [...] power ballad that encapsulates Miley's journey and the message of the film."

"The Climb" was chosen as the lead single from the soundtrack due to its country elements, which introduced Cyrus to listeners beyond her usual pop audience. The song is Cyrus's first solo effort marketed directly to country radio, though she had previously recorded and released a country duet with her father, Billy Ray Cyrus, which was titled "Ready, Set, Don't Go", in 2007. Warren Truitt of About.com referred to the song as "Miley's serious attempt to break into the contemporary country world." The song became available as a digital download on March 5, 2009 through a marketing agreement with Rick Hendrix Company and Apple Music. It was released to US country radio, and adult contemporary radio on March 10. On April 24, it was released in Germany as a CD. In October 2009, it was re-released to countries outside the United States in the international version of Cyrus' extended play, The Time of Our Lives.

== Composition ==
"The Climb"
A 24-second sample of "The Climb". The song is a power ballad. Its lyrics refer to staying optimistic and use a metaphor to compare mountaineering and life.

"The Climb" is a country pop power ballad that incorporates soft rock and pop rock styles and lasts 3 minutes and 55 seconds. However, at two minutes and forty-five seconds, a "sudden, spiky burst of violins" enters the song, and the song switches to full power. Todd Martens, co-editor of the Los Angeles Times music column, says Cyrus uses "a raspy voice [that] brings a bit of country grit" to the song. "The Climb" is set in common time at a moderate tempo of 80 beats per minute. The song is sung in the key of E major, and Cyrus' vocal range spans one and a half octaves from the low note of E_{3} to the high note of C♯_{5}. The song uses a standard-issue ballad arrangement with the chord progression, E5–Asus2–F♯7sus.

According to music reviewer Fraser McAlpine of the BBC, the song's lyrics assert that life should be viewed as "a journey which is difficult but rewarding". Both Martens and McAlpine took special interest in the line "It's always gonna be an uphill battle/Sometimes I'm gonna have to lose". Martens interpreted the line as an acknowledgment by the singer of her own mistakes in life, while McAlpine wrote, "In this song which is about plugging away at things, the writers have slipped in [...] that the occasional setback isn't the end of the world." Others have suggested that Cyrus is also borrowing from Albert Camus' The Myth of Sisyphus, highlighting the absurdity of life.

== Critical reception ==
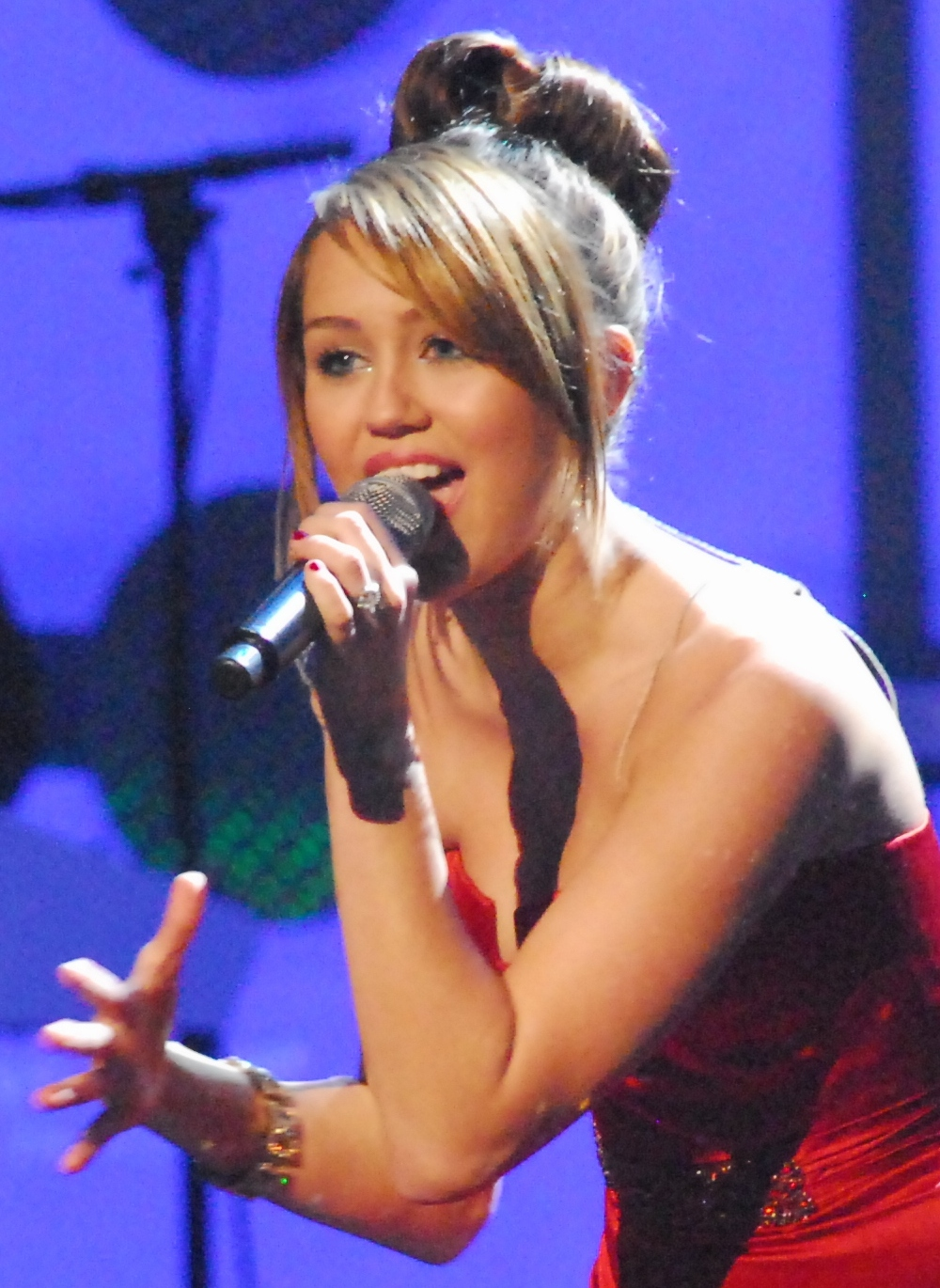
Cyrus premiered "The Climb" at the Kids' Inaugural: "We Are the Future" event in January 2009.

Critical reception for the song was generally positive. Fraser McAlpine of the BBC felt the song's lyrics were generic, but complimented Cyrus vocals: "Miley acquits herself well vocally—there are moments where her voice sounds a tad strained, but it's good to hear her on a track that's a little more subdued and with less frantic production than the uptempo, sassy pop songs we're used to." Michael Menachem of Billboard magazine called the song "one of the year's strongest ballads". Wesley Morris of The Boston Globe praised "The Climb" for being a "pretty liberation anthem". Leah Greenblatt of Entertainment Weekly said, "On tunes like [...] 'The Climb', the 16-year-old Tennessee native turns up her homegrown inflections, but a few elongated r's won't exactly shut out her huge pop audience." Todd Martens of The Los Angeles Times believed that "The Climb" was "buried in cheese" and described it as "pre-Valentine's Day gooeyness". However, Martens said, "'The Climb' is the rare Miley ballad that's on par with some of her more spunky teen pop." Matt Bjorke of Roughstock praised this song as a reminder to enjoy life, "even with 'struggles they're facing' being almost too numerous to mention."

Heather Phares of AllMusic said, "the best songs that Cyrus sings on the soundtrack have her own name on them". She also made musical comparisons to Shania Twain and described the song as "natural, [...] down to earth and grown-up". While reviewing The Time of Our Lives, Michael Hann of The Guardian called "The Climb" a "one rather superior ballad", compared to "When I Look at You" and "Obsessed". Hann said the song was added to the extended play to "add some ballast since this collection's US release." Jon Caraminica of The New York Times described "The Climb" as an "appealing new single [that] is just the sort of demure, inspirational country-rock that could easily be mistaken for self-reckoning." While reviewing a concert performance, James Reed of The Boston Globe called the song "bland but inspirational fare".

=== Awards and nominations ===
"The Climb" won "Best Song from a Movie" at the 2009 MTV Movie Awards and "Music Choice: Single" at the 2009 Teen Choice Awards. At the 52nd Grammy Awards, "The Climb" received a nomination for the Best Song Written for a Motion Picture, Television or Other Visual Media, a songwriter's award. However, Walt Disney Records withdrew the song from consideration because the song was not "written specifically for a motion picture, television or other visual media", as the Grammy eligibility rules dictated. According to Rolling Stone, "The Climb" was submitted for consideration by mistake. The National Academy of Recording Arts and Sciences (NARAS), the presenters of the Grammy Awards, released a statement stating, "Walt Disney Records was proactive and forthcoming to our awards department and verified that the song was not written specifically for the film Hannah Montana: The Movie. Based on this information, the Academy has complied with the label's request." NARAS replaced the nomination with the song with the next highest initial vote count, "All is Love", which was written by Karen O and Nick Zinner for the film Where the Wild Things Are. Dan Milliken of Country Universe gave the song a D+. His review consisted solely of two motivational posters: one reading "Life: Its [sic] not about the destination, but the journey" to describe the song's content, and a mock poster reading "Success: Everything is easy when you're cute" for his actual review. He later expanded his review, calling it "a soulless rephrasing of an extremely famous philosophical message (so famous it borders on cliche) that doesn't provide an emotionally coherent context or justification". Milliken gave the song a higher grade because "she's a pretty good singer for someone her age".

== Commercial performance ==
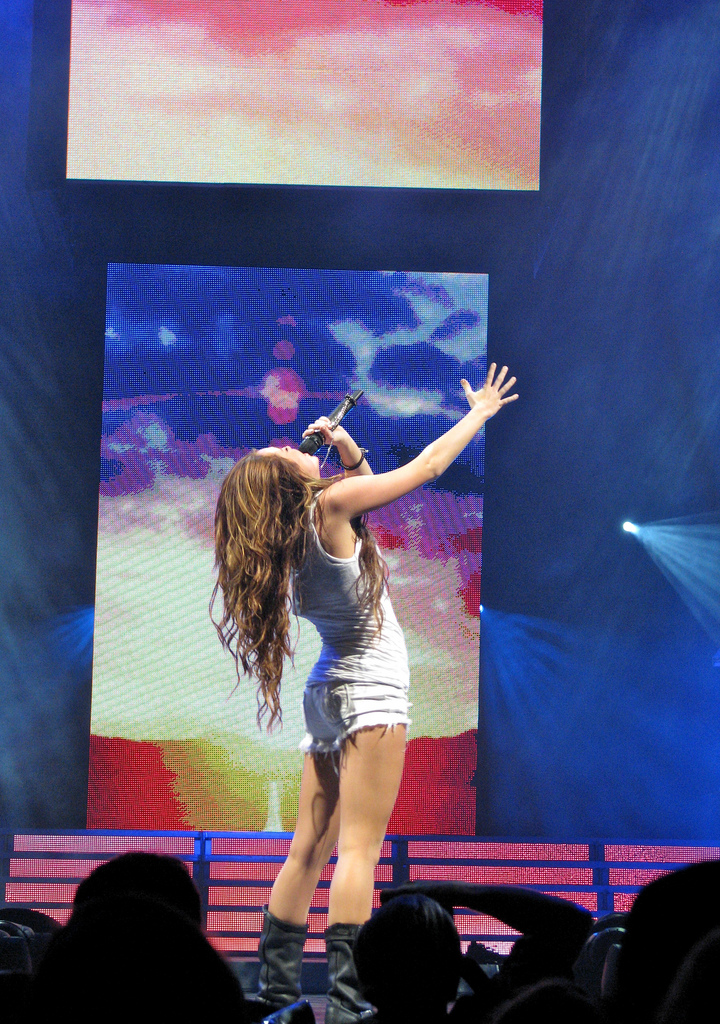
Cyrus performing "The Climb" as the closing number of her Wonder World Tour

On the week ending March 7, 2009, "The Climb" debuted at number 48 on Billboard's Hot Country Songs. It was, incidentally, the same week that "Back to Tennessee", by Cyrus' father, Billy Ray Cyrus, debuted at number 59, the first time a father and daughter had separate charting songs on the chart since Johnny and Rosanne Cash charted in 1990 with "Silver Stallion" and "One Step Over the Line", respectively. "The Climb" eventually peaked at number 25 on the country-genre chart. For the week ending March 21, 2009, the song debuted at number six on the Billboard Hot 100 due to sales of 166,000 digital downloads, thus making "The Climb" Cyrus's highest-charting effort at the time, surpassing her previous best-charting effort "7 Things", which peaked at number nine in July 2008. For the week ending May 2, 2009, the song reached its peak at number four on the Hot 100. "The Climb" also peaked at number seven on the Pop 100 chart, 42 on Hot Christian Songs, and at number one for 15 consecutive weeks on Hot Adult Contemporary Tracks. Cyrus became the youngest artist to top Adult Contemporary since LeAnn Rimes entered the chart in 1997 with "How Do I Live". According to Billboard, "The Climb" was the eighth best selling digital single of 2009. The single was certified six times platinum by the Recording Industry Association of America (RIAA) for the sales of over six million sales. As of January 2014, "The Climb" has sold 3,709,000 copies in the United States. In Canada, "The Climb" entered at number 17 and eventually peaked at number five. The single was certified triple platinum by Music Canada for the sales of 240,000 digital downloads.

"The Climb" was also a success in Australia and New Zealand. The song made its debut on the Australian Singles Chart at number 46 on April 19, 2009. After 10 weeks on the chart, "The Climb" reached number five on the chart, where it stayed for two consecutive weeks. "The Climb" was placed at number 84 on the decade-end Australian Singles Chart. The song has been certified platinum by the Australian Recording Industry Association for sales above 70,000. "The Climb" debuted in the New Zealand Singles Chart at number 25 on April 13, 2009, and reached its peak at number 12 on June 15, 2009.

In the UK Singles Chart, "The Climb" made its entry at number 82 on March 28, 2009, and reached its peak at number 11 on June 16, 2009. With its peak at number 11, it tied for Cyrus's best-charting effort on the chart with "See You Again" from October 2008. The single was certified silver by the British Phonographic Industry (BPI) for the shipment of over 200,000 copies. In Ireland, the song also peaked at number 11. In mainland Europe, the song peaked at number 23 on Eurochart Hot 100 Singles, number 11 on Belgian Tip Singles Chart (Flanders), and number five on Norwegian Singles Chart. The song experienced similar commercial outcomes throughout the rest of Europe; it appeared within the top 30 of charts in Austria, Belgium (Wallonia), and France.

== Music video ==
Cyrus shown singing at the top of the mountain in the music video for "The Climb". This setting is similar to that of the music video for "I'm Not a Girl, Not Yet a Woman" by Britney Spears.

The music video for "The Climb" premiered on Cyrus' Myspace page on February 11, 2009. The video commences with a shot of Cyrus holding a guitar and a suitcase as she begins to walk down a long path extending through a valley. At the end of the valley, the sun breaks out over a distant mountain. The entire scene is enhanced with computer-generated imagery. Cyrus has her hair tied in a bun and wears a traveling jacket, a gray tank top, and cowboy boots. In a separate setting, Cyrus, wearing a gray short-sleeved shirt and her hair loose, begins to sing "The Climb" beneath a blue spotlight in a purple room. The two settings alternate throughout the video. A vignetted scene from Hannah Montana: The Movie appears in front of Cyrus as she walks on the path. The video zooms into the scene and a montage of film clips plays, featuring Cyrus's character and her love interest, Travis Brody (played by Lucas Till) horseback riding. The video returns to Cyrus walking; she picks up a rose fallen on the path, then throws it behind her. As the video progresses, she also sees things such as a herd of horses and a shooting star cross her path. A new setting enters the video in which Cyrus dances in a purple room with a countdown, or occasionally, film clips projected on the wall behind her. Rain begins to pour in the path setting. Cyrus puts down her jacket, guitar case, suitcase, and boots, and continues onwards with only her guitar strapped to her shoulder. More film clip montages play in the same manner as the first. As the last montage ends, Cyrus finally reaches the summit of a reddish, CGI mountain and triumphantly looks over the cliff's edge to watch the sun shining over a shimmering lake. An alternate version of the music video excluding the Hannah Montana: The Movie clips exists and was sent to several channels, including VH1.

Todd Martens of the Los Angeles Times wrote that while he enjoyed the song, he was unsure about the video. He commented that while the video was an improvement since Cyrus' video for "7 Things" (2008), the settings in "The Climb" music video looked as though they had been painted by Thomas Kinkade and Cyrus' dancing appeared off-beat. Travis of MTV described the video as "beautifully shot (although heavily digitized)". Lyndsey Parker of Yahoo! Music remarked that the summit setting was similar to that of the music video for Britney Spears' "I'm Not a Girl, Not Yet a Woman". Parker also felt the scene in which Cyrus looks out over the cliff, shot using large sweeps with an aerial camera, had been "lifted straight out of an '80s Bon Jovi video". In 2009, the video received a MuchMusic Video nomination for Best International Artist Video, but lost to Lady Gaga's music video for "Poker Face".

As of April 2026, the video was briefly blocked outside of the United States, Canada, United Kingdom and South Korea, but on April 22, 2026, the video was restored worldwide except for Russia and Belarus.

== Live performances ==
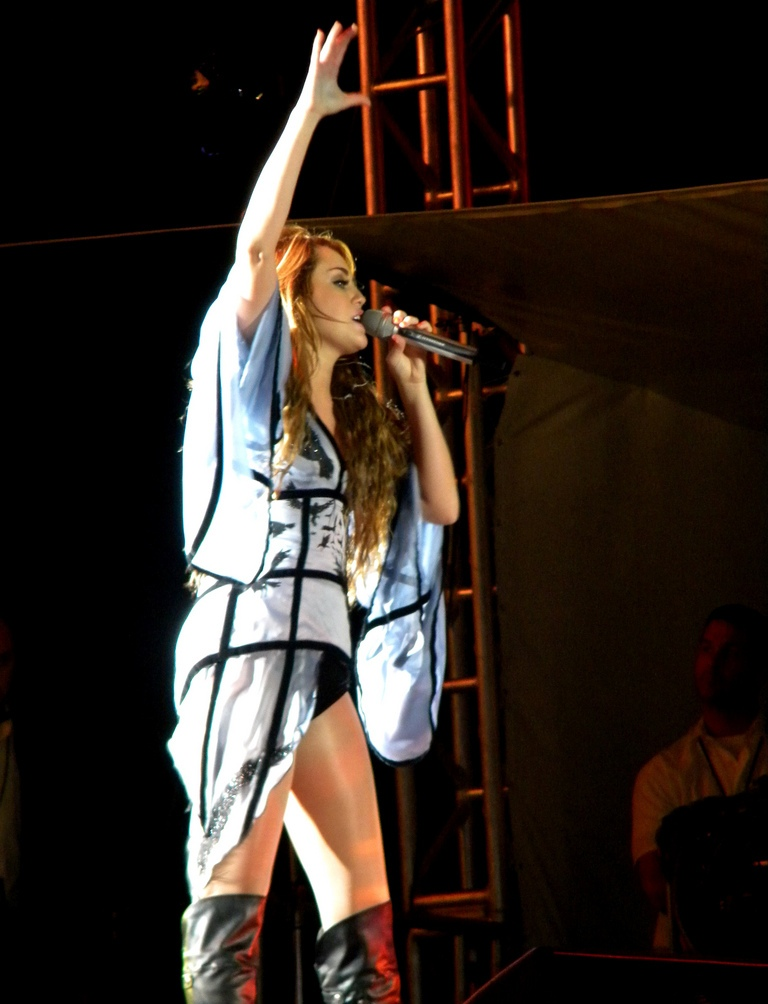
Cyrus performing "The Climb" during the Gypsy Heart Tour

Cyrus opened the Kids' Inaugural: "We Are the Future" event with the premiere of "The Climb". The event was held on January 19, 2009, in Washington DC, at the Verizon Center to celebrate the inauguration of Barack Obama as President of the United States. Cyrus, dressed in an embroidered red ball gown made by Reem Acra, dedicated the song to Obama's daughters, Sasha and Malia Obama. Following the song's official release in March 2009, Cyrus resumed promotion for "The Climb", performing live for shows including American Idol, The Tonight Show with Jay Leno, the 44th annual Academy of Country Music Awards, Good Morning America, and Live with Regis and Kelly throughout April. On April 13, Cyrus performed "The Climb" as part of her set for the Sessions@AOL. On April 24, Cyrus sang "The Climb" and other songs in a London Apple Store. The performances were recorded and sold exclusively by the United Kingdom iTunes Store as a live extended play titled iTunes Live from London. On June 7, 2009, Cyrus performed the song at the 20th annual A Time for Heroes Celebrity Carnival, an outdoor carnival supporting the Elizabeth Glaser Pediatric AIDS Foundation. Cyrus also sang "The Climb" on The Today Show on August 28 and at the first D23 Expo on September 11, 2009.

To promote the Hannah Montana: The Movie soundtrack, Cyrus performed "The Climb" on a six-day, five-city acoustic radio promotional tour that reached over 250 radio shows. The song was also used as the closing number of Cyrus' 2009 Wonder World Tour, her first world tour. During the tour performances, Cyrus performed in a white tank top and shorts, boots, and a metallic vest, while giant overhead video screens displayed sunsets. After finishing, Cyrus exited through a passageway in the stage while the images of shooting stars and the earth in space appeared on the screen. Melinda M. Thompson of the Oregonian described the performance as "really a moment to remember—Miley's soulful and touching rendition of 'The Climb'", while Jim Harrington of The Oakland Tribune said the performance was a "tender closer" that drew a large response at the September 18 concert in Oakland, California, at the Oracle Arena.

Cyrus performed the song during the Gypsy Heart Tour. She also performed this song on CNN Heroes on December 11, 2011. Six years later, in 2017, she performed the song on The Tonight Show Starring Jimmy Fallon, followed by an acoustic version on The Howard Stern Show, and on March 24, 2018, Cyrus performed it before a massive outdoor crowd protesting gun violence at the March For Our Lives in Washington, DC. On May 15, 2020, Cyrus performed the song for #Graduation 2020: Facebook and Instagram Celebrate the Class of 2020.

In 2023, Cyrus did a version of the song as part of her Backyard Sessions live performance series. It was the only track from the session that was not from her 2023 album Endless Summer Vacation.

== Charts ==
=== Weekly charts ===
Weekly chart performance
| Chart (2009) | Peak position |
|---|---|
| Australia (ARIA) | 5 |
| Austria (Ö3 Austria Top 40) | 30 |
| Canada Hot 100 (Billboard) | 5 |
| Canada AC (Billboard) | 1 |
| Canada CHR/Top 40 (Billboard) | 21 |
| Canada Country (Billboard) | 22 |
| Canada Hot AC (Billboard) | 5 |
| Denmark (Tracklisten) | 37 |
| France (SNEP) | 16 |
| Germany (GfK) | 41 |
| Ireland (IRMA) | 11 |
| Italy (FIMI) | 40 |
| New Zealand (Recorded Music NZ) | 12 |
| Norway (VG-lista) | 5 |
| Scottish Singles Sales (Official Charts) | 9 |
| Spain (Promusicae) | 46 |
| Sweden (Sverigetopplistan) | 40 |
| Switzerland (Schweizer Hitparade) | 40 |
| UK Singles (Official Charts) | 11 |
| US Billboard Hot 100 | 4 |
| US Adult Contemporary (Billboard) | 1 |
| US Adult Pop Airplay (Billboard) | 5 |
| US Hot Christian Songs (Billboard) | 42 |
| US Hot Country Songs (Billboard) | 25 |
| US Pop Airplay (Billboard) | 5 |

=== Year-end charts ===
2009 year-end chart performance
| Chart (2009) | Position |
|---|---|
| Australia (ARIA) | 16 |
| Brazil (Crowley) | 68 |
| Canada (Canadian Hot 100) | 10 |
| New Zealand (RIANZ) | 43 |
| UK Singles (Official Charts Company) | 84 |
| US Billboard Hot 100 | 21 |
| US Adult Contemporary (Billboard) | 6 |
| US Adult Top 40 (Billboard) | 30 |
| US Mainstream Top 40 (Billboard) | 33 |

2010 year-end chart performance
| Chart (2010) | Position |
|---|---|
| US Adult Contemporary (Billboard) | 19 |

=== Decade-end charts ===
Decade-end chart performance
| Chart (2000–09) | Position |
|---|---|
| Australia (ARIA) | 84 |

== Certifications ==
Certifications
| Region | Certification | Certified units/sales |
|---|---|---|
| Australia (ARIA) | 7× Platinum | 490,000^{‡} |
| Brazil (Pro-Música Brasil) | Platinum | 60,000^{‡} |
| Canada (Music Canada) | 3× Platinum | 120,000^{*} |
| Denmark (IFPI Danmark) | Platinum | 90,000^{‡} |
| Germany (BVMI) | Gold | 150,000^{‡} |
| New Zealand (RMNZ) | 3× Platinum | 90,000^{‡} |
| Spain (Promusicae) | Platinum | 60,000^{‡} |
| United Kingdom (BPI) | 2× Platinum | 1,200,000^{‡} |
| United States (RIAA) | 7× Platinum | 7,000,000^{‡} |
^{*} Sales figures based on certification alone.^{‡} Sales+streaming figures based on certification alone.

== Release history ==
Release history
| Region | Date | Format | Version(s) | Label(s) | Ref. |
|---|---|---|---|---|---|
| Various | March 5, 2009 | Digital download | Original | Hollywood | |
| United States | March 10, 2009 | Adult contemporary radio | Original | Walt Disney; Hollywood | |
| United States | March 10, 2009 | Country radio | Original | Walt Disney; Hollywood; Lyric Street | |
| Germany | April 24, 2009 | CD | Original; stripped | Hollywood | |
| United States | November 11, 2022 | 12" vinyl | Original; stripped; full pop mix | Walt Disney | |

== Cover versions ==
"The Climb" has been covered several times. At auditions for the ninth season of the television singing competition American Idol, "The Climb" was the most popular choice of song amongst contestants. The song was covered by students in GEMS Wellington International School as a charity single, which debuted at the top of UAE download and UK soundtrack charts on iTunes within hours of being released. The proceeds went to Harmony House, an orphanage in India.

For BBC Children in Need in 2015 1661 children performed the song live in unison from 10 towns across the UK to raise money for the charity. The choir is a regular feature on the telethon and performs a different song each year. The performance starting in the studio cut between the 10 choirs giving them about 15 seconds of air time before going back to the studio to finish. The choirs sang from: Elstree at Elstree Studios the studio on the outskirts of London where the main telethon was held, Gloucester at Gloucester Cathedral, Belfast at BBC Blackstaff House, Keswick at The Rawnsley Centre, Great Yarmouth at The Hippodrome, Llandudno at Venue Cymru, Jersey at Fort Regent, Blackpool at Blackpool Tower Circus, Glasgow at BBC Pacific Quay and Arundel at Arundel Castle

== Joe McElderry version ==
"The Climb"

Single by Joe McElderry

from the album Wide Awake
- Released: December 14, 2009
- Genre: Country pop
- Length: 3:36
- Label: Syco
- Songwriters: Jessi Alexander, Jon Mabe
- Producer: Quiz & Larossi

Joe McElderry singles chronology
| "The Climb" (2009) | "Ambitions" (2010) |

=== Background and composition ===
In the same year of "The Climb"'s original release, British executive Simon Cowell chose for Joe McElderry, Olly Murs, and Stacey Solomon, the three finalists of the sixth series of the British television talent contest The X Factor, to record the song in preparation for a single release as soon as the winner was announced. After Solomon's elimination, Murs and McElderry sang the song on December 13, 2009, as their final performance in the competition. Upon winning the competition, McElderry's version of "The Climb", produced by Quiz & Larossi, was released as a single on December 14, 2009, by Syco Music.

McElderry said that the lyrics to "The Climb" meant a lot to him: "It's an emotional song because it's what's been happening in the last few months. It all feels very, very surreal." According to Peter Robinson of The Guardian, the cover has a "plinky" piano in its introduction. In regards to lyrics, Robinson interpreted, "lines about 'uphill battles' and 'having to lose' do seem to talk of Joe's probable future."

=== Reception ===
Peter Robinson of The Guardian described "The Climb" as a "controversially uncontroversial choice" for a cover and continued, "While 'The Climb' might be a suitable choice for a winner's single, the fact that it's a cover of such a recent song means that it's still slightly odd."

On the week ending 26 December 2009, "The Climb" debuted at number two on the UK Singles Chart; its debut position was influenced by a campaign composed of Facebook group members, aimed at getting Rage Against the Machine's 1992 single "Killing in the Name" to the top position during Christmas week. In the following week, the song reached number one, becoming the final number one of the 2000s decade, where it maintained for a week. It became 2009's New Years number one. The single was certified Platinum by the British Phonographic Industry (BPI) for shipments exceeding 600,000 copies. The song has sold 810,000 copies in the UK as of January 2015.

"The Climb" debuted at number one on the Irish Singles Chart on the week ending December 17, 2009, where it maintained in the top position for four consecutive weeks. In mainland Europe, the song charted in the Eurochart Hot 100 Singles at number four on the week ending January 9, 2010.

=== Music video ===
McElderry performing in a flooded cityscape in "The Climb" music video

The video was shot on December 16, 2009, in London, England. The video begins with footage from The X Factor and then transitions to a close-up shot of McElderry in the main setting, a flooded cityscape—the scene was shot in a flooded set with a cityscape backdrop. McElderry is clothed by a grey vest and a grey shirt, as he stands in the setting and performs. Throughout the entire video, scenes alternate between the flooded cityscape setting and recycled footage from The X Factor, which are in black and white until it shows him in the live shows in colour. The video concludes with McElderry being informed he won the competition, hugging his peers.

=== Track listings ===
- Digital download
1. "The Climb" – 3:36
- CD single
1. "The Climb" – 3:36
2. "Somebody to Love" – 2:38
3. "Don't Let the Sun Go Down on Me" – 2:27

=== Charts and certifications ===
==== Weekly charts ====
| Chart (2009–10) | Peak position |
|---|---|
| Eurochart Hot 100 Singles | 4 |
| Ireland (IRMA) | 1 |
| Scottish Singles Sales (Official Charts) | 1 |
| UK Singles (Official Charts) | 1 |

==== Year-end charts ====
| Chart (2009) | Position |
|---|---|
| Ireland (IRMA) | 1 |
| UK Singles (Official Charts Company) | 5 |

==== Certifications ====
| Region | Certification | Certified units/sales |
|---|---|---|
| United Kingdom (BPI) | Platinum | 810,000 |

== See also ==
- List of Billboard Adult Contemporary number ones of 2009
- List of number-one singles of 2009 (Ireland)
- List of number-one singles of 2010 (Ireland)
- List of UK Singles Chart number ones of the 2010s
