= Dooo It! =

2015 song by Miley Cyrus

Song by Miley Cyrus

from the album Miley Cyrus & Her Dead Petz
- Studio: Pink Floor Studios (Oklahoma City, OK)
- Genre: Southern hip hop; R&B
- Length: 3:35
- Label: Smiley Miley; RCA
- Songwriters: Miley Cyrus; Wayne Coyne; Steven Drozd; Dennis Coyne
- Producers: Miley Cyrus; The Flaming Lips

Music video
- "Dooo It!" on YouTube

"Dooo It!" is a song by American singer Miley Cyrus from her fifth studio album Miley Cyrus & Her Dead Petz (2015). It was premiered on August 30, 2015, with a live performance during the 2015 MTV Video Music Awards, which Cyrus hosted, and was made available free online without prior announcement alongside the parent album. It serves to promote the project.

== Composition ==
Lyrically, "Dooo It!" is "primarily about [Cyrus'] love of marijuana and peace". NY Daily News said the song "hits some new sweet spot between loopy R&B and the more drug-friendly forms of Southern hip hop".

== Live performances ==
Cyrus first performed the song as a collaborative effort with The Flaming Lips and dozens of RuPaul's Drag Race contestants in haute couture designs for the 2015 MTV Video Music Awards, which she hosted. RuPaul's Drag Race contestants, including Courtney Act, Willam Belli, Pandora Boxx, Tammie Brown, Carmen Carrera, Violet Chachki, Alyssa Edwards, Monica Beverly Hillz, Laganja Estranja, Alexis Mateo, Gia Gunn, Miss Fame, Pearl, Shangela Laquifa Wadley, and Jessica Wild, were featured in the performance. The Flaming Lips frontman Wayne Coyne came to the front of the stage to launch confetti cannons between Cyrus' legs at the end of the song.

== Music video ==
The music video for "Dooo It!" features a close-up shot of Cyrus smoking marijuana, licking and regurgitating glitter and pouring home-made facial masks on her face. It was shot in July 2015. Billboard's Erin Strecker said of the video: "It's gross, intriguing, performance art-y and may make you want to take up crafting, stat." Jezebel described it as "glitter bukkake", and The Harvard Crimson suggests that "[i]f you look closely enough, given that you have the stomach to do so, you can probably see the seven deadly sins represented. Perhaps in 'Dooo It!,' Cyrus, like John Doe in that one Fincher flick, merely holds a mirror to her morally empty society. If we recoil in horror, it is hardly the mirror's fault."

== Charts ==
Chart (2015)	Peak position
Canada Hot 100 (Billboard)	60
