= Week Without You =

Promotional single by Miley Cyrus

from the album Younger Now
- Released: September 21, 2017
- Studio: United Recording (Los Angeles)
- Genre: Country
- Length: 3:44
- Label: RCA
- Composers: Miley Cyrus; Oren Yoel
- Lyricist: Miley Cyrus
- Producers: Oren Yoel; Miley Cyrus

Miley Cyrus singles chronology
"Inspired" (2017)	"Week Without You" (2017)	"Happy Xmas (War Is Over)" (2018)

Licensed audio
- "Week Without You" on YouTube

"Week Without You" is a song by American singer Miley Cyrus. It was released on September 21, 2017, through RCA Records, as the second promotional single from Cyrus' sixth studio album, Younger Now. As of September 2017, the song has moved around 3,400 digital copies in the United States according to Nielsen SoundScan.

== Background ==
Cyrus stated in a press release: "This writing process has been a really different experience because I've never put out an album this way. People have been asking me, 'is this like a re-introduction of yourself?' But it's not that at all. Actually, it's more like, I am this person who embraces all my past selves. This album is the most me for right now that I can be."

== Critical reception ==
Tatiana Cirisano of Billboard described the song as "a twangy, country-tinged break-up waiting to happen". Ross McNeilage of MTV News called the song a "a country kiss-off to an unsatisfying lover", and felt it is "full-out country in its production, compared to the airy fun vibes of 'Malibu' and 'Younger Now', as Miley sings of leaving over a familiar-sounding guitar melody". Deepa Lakshmin of the same publication opined that the song "takes the opposite approach" of "Malibu", as it "is basically one giant breakup fantasy". Chris Thomas of Out called it a "twangy, country song", and felt it would make listeners "strumming their imaginary guitar on their fire escape while they cry and chainsmoke". Luke Britton of NME regarded the song as "another country-tinged, retro affair" that "concerns a break-up".

== Charts ==
Chart performance for "Week Without You"
Chart (2017)	Peak position
New Zealand Heatseekers (RMNZ)	8
