= Nicole Row =

American bass guitarist

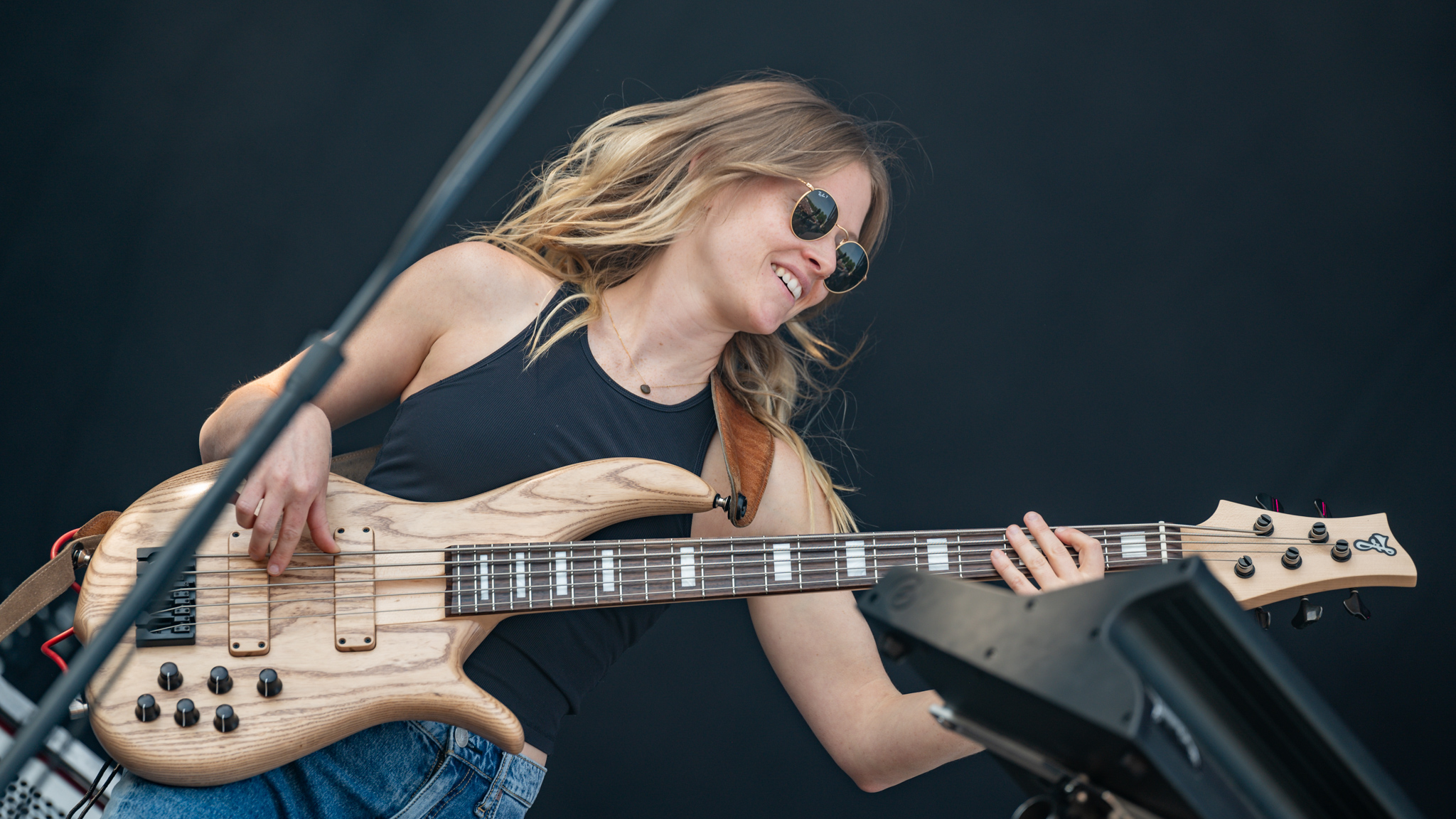
- Row with Incubus in 2023

Background information
- Born: Nicole Sue Row; June 30, 1991 (age 35); Fresno, California, U.S.
- Genres: Alternative rock; indie rock; alternative metal; pop rock
- Occupation: Musician
- Instruments: Bass guitar; upright bass; keyboard bass; vocals
- Years active: 2010–present
- Member of: Incubus

Nicole Sue Row (born June 30, 1991) is an American musician who is the current bassist of the rock band Incubus. She first gained visibility by touring with Miley Cyrus in 2017, and she was the touring bass player for Panic! at the Disco from 2018 until 2023. She joined Incubus on tour in March 2023 and was made a full band member in February 2024.

Row started her career in Los Angeles studying at the Musicians Institute. She jammed with locals, supported a Top 40 cover band, and played single dates with various musicians including Troye Sivan, Ty Dolla Sign and Dua Lipa. Her bass-playing style has adapted over time, changing from a purist finger-picking stance to incorporating 5-string bass and synth bass, a wide collection of guitar pedals, and occasional usage of guitar picks.

== Early career ==
Row was born and raised in Fresno, California. She grew up in a house without musical instruments, so her first music participation was through singing. Her father worked as an electrician and competed as a bodybuilder. Her mother is a medium. Her siblings turned to music: the older brother played drums and the younger brother embraced guitar. Her first concert experience was seeing the Deftones play the indoor arena at California State University, Fresno, when she was about 13 years old. Row was "obsessed with" the ska punk band Sublime, and was inspired by their bassist Eric Wilson. She picked up the bass guitar at age 17. She moved to Los Angeles in 2010, enrolling in the Musicians Institute to study bass. She leaned toward jazz and funk music, practicing music by Larry Graham, Marcus Miller and John Paul Jones.

Row participated in jam nights at the Black Rabbit Rose theatre and lounge in Los Angeles, and eventually hosted her own night on Thursdays. She gigged regularly at The Stratosphere in Las Vegas, handling bass and vocal duties for a Top 40 cover band. Row supported one-off performances by other artists such as Troye Sivan, Daya, Fat Joe, Remy Ma, Ty Dolla Sign, Dallas Austin, Christina Perri and Dua Lipa.

Row recorded bass on the Miley Cyrus single "Inspired", which was included on the album Younger Now (2017). She toured with Cyrus for most of 2017, supporting the album. Row came into rehearsals expecting to play nothing but keyboard bass, but Cyrus directed her musicians to bring more personal flair to the live show. On upright bass, Row backed Cyrus singing "Malibu" at the 2017 Billboard Music Awards in May, and again in June for The Tonight Show Starring Jimmy Fallon, also performing "Inspired". Cyrus included Row for a performance on the television series The Voice. Again on upright bass, Row accompanied Cyrus performing "Younger Now" on BBC Radio 1's Live Lounge in September. Playing electric bass guitar in October, Row supported Cyrus singing "The Climb" on The Tonight Show Starring Jimmy Fallon. Row appeared several times backing Cyrus on Saturday Night Live in 2017–18.

== Panic! at the Disco ==
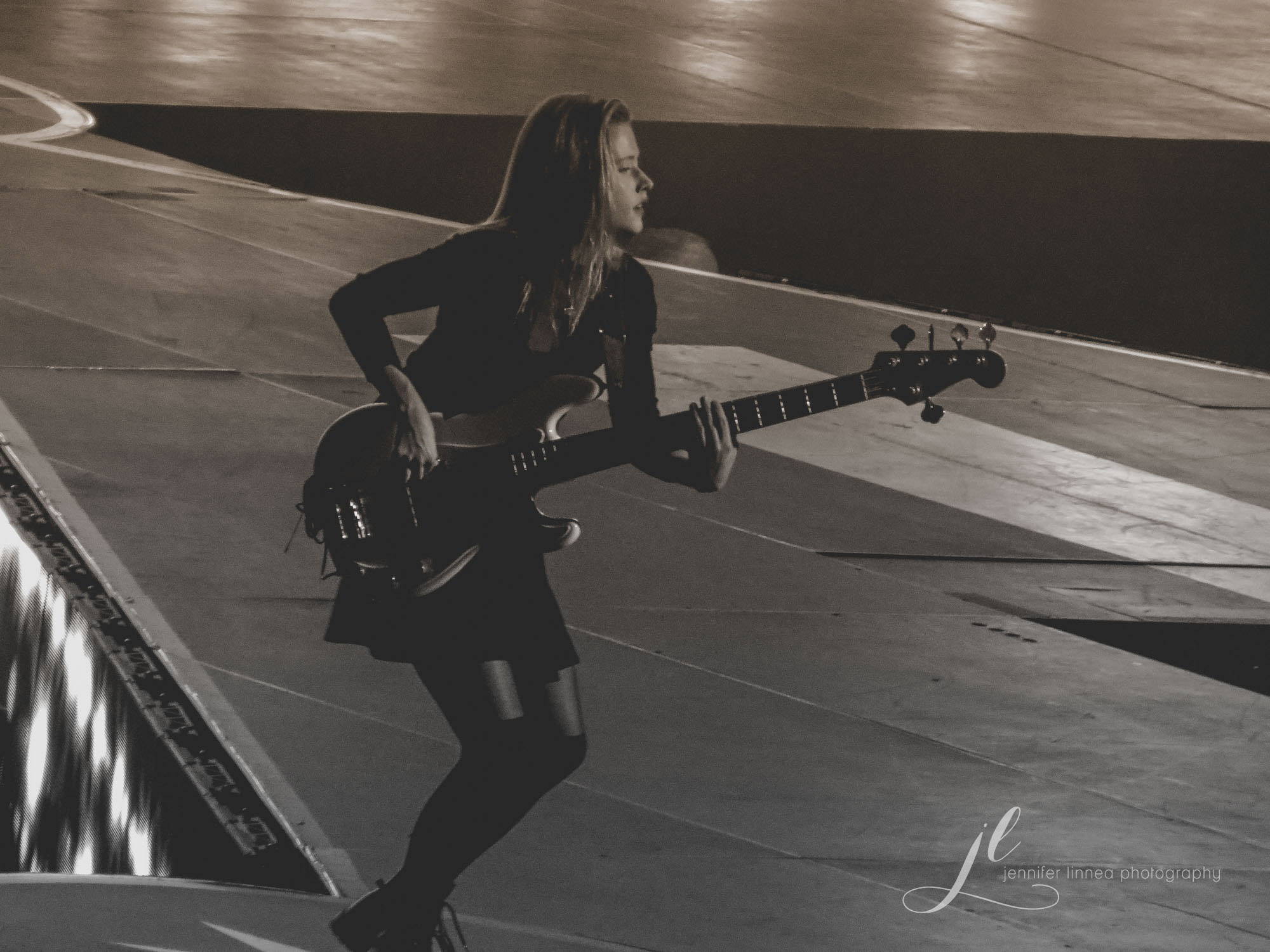
Row with Panic! at the Disco in 2018, playing a 5-string bass

As a touring musician, Row replaced Panic! at the Disco bass player Dallon Weekes who left the band in December 2017. When Row was asked to join the group, she only had two weeks to learn the band's songs spanning fourteen years and six albums. Her first concert with the band was in Cleveland, Ohio, on March 19, 2018. Longtime Panic! at the Disco frontman Brendon Urie kept Row in a touring role; she did not appear on the band's albums. In January 2023, Urie announced that the band would break up in March. Row's final date with the band was at the conclusion of the Viva Las Vengeance Tour in England on March 10, closing out five years of touring with Panic! at the Disco. The next morning before her flight home, she was informed that Incubus was asking whether she would join their band on tour.

Between Panic dates, Row collaborated with other musicians, including Dua Lipa on the song "Levitating" performed live for Time 100 Next in May 2021. Row backed Christina Perri singing "Evergone" on The Ellen DeGeneres Show in April 2022. She joined Jack Conte's Scary Pockets YouTube project covering Chicago's "Saturday in the Park" in July 2022, and also for a re-invention of the Bruno Mars song "Grenade".

In Las Vegas, Row played again with Panic at the fifth When We Were Young festival on October 18, 2025, performing Panic's first album A Fever You Can't Sweat Out in its entirety, commemorating its 20th anniversary.

== Incubus ==
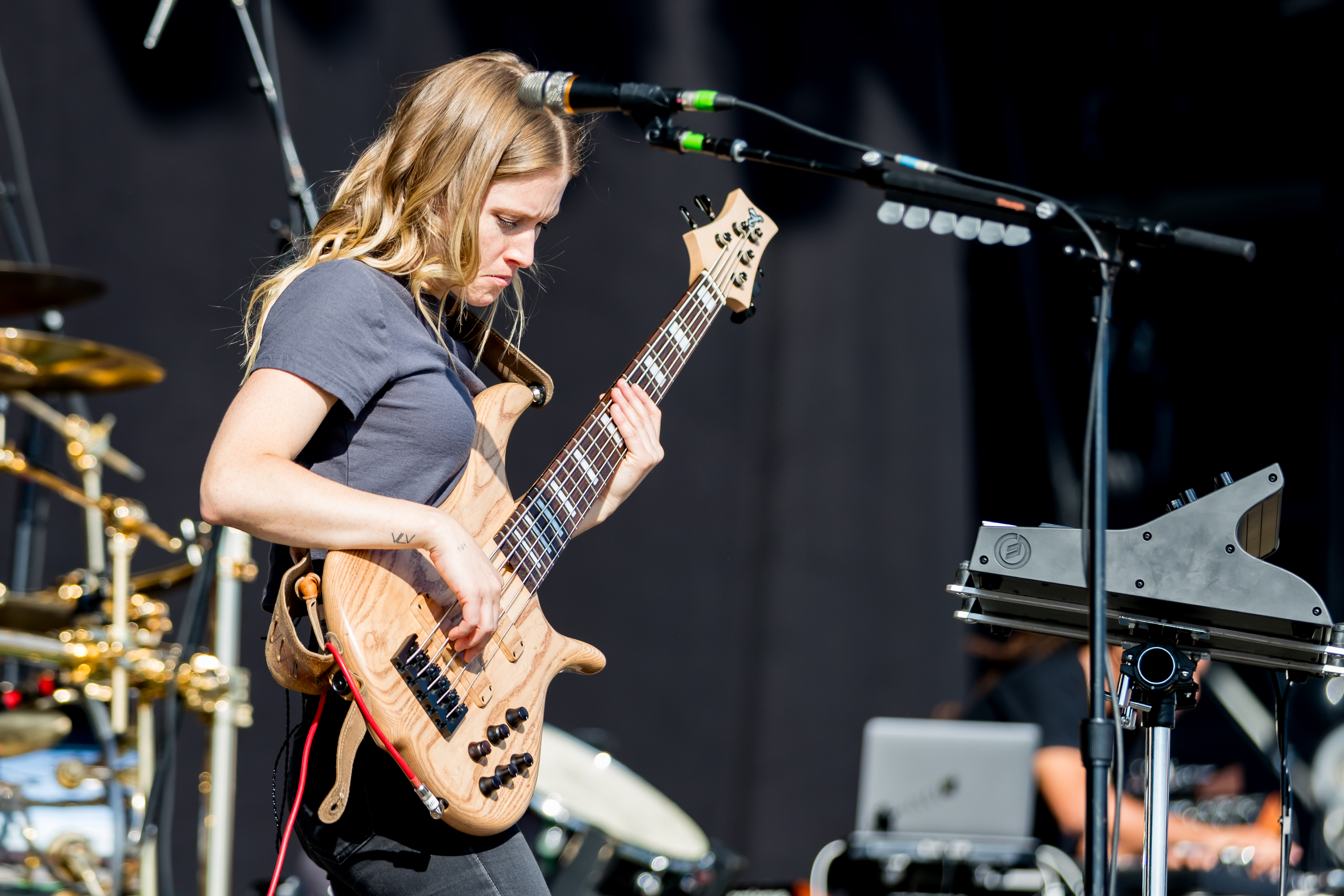
Row performing in Germany with Incubus in June 2023. She is playing an F Bass BN5 model, while a Moog Little Phatty analog synth is available on a stand, wired to the pedalboard.

Row first worked with Incubus as a temporary replacement for bass player Ben Kenney who was recovering from brain surgery. Kenney's first replacement was Tal Wilkenfeld who toured with Incubus for two months, then in March 2023 Row began rehearsing to replace Wilkenfeld. The band was surprised to learn that Row had been a fan of Incubus during her school years, and could already sing their songs by heart. The tour spanned May to October, with 46 dates in North America and Europe. Incubus lead singer Brandon Boyd said that Row "brought a whole new universe into our band, which has been amazing." The band joked about her youth, noting that her birth year of 1991 was the same year that Incubus was founded. DJ Chris Kilmore observed that she "brings our collective age down".

In the studio, Row covered bass duties on Morning View XXIII, a 2023 re-recording of the 2001 Incubus album Morning View. Boyd praised Row's musicianship, saying she "put her own stamp" on the old songs, for instance adding a chordal style intro to "Nice to Know You". Row said she used four different basses for the recording, with half of the sessions played in hotel rooms while touring. After Kenney notified the band that he would not return, Row officially joined Incubus on bass and Boyd said she had "become part of this band family."

== Equipment ==
Row's first bass guitar was a Gretsch Junior Jet. She often performs using her fingers rather than a pick. She endorsed Fender guitars, and her first professional instrument was a Fender Marcus Miller Signature Jazz Bass. She has also played acoustic upright bass, keyboard synth bass, and acoustic bass guitar.

In her early years, she endorsed Form Factor Audio amplifiers. Later, she switched to EICH Amplification bass heads. She also endorsed Bartolini pickups and electronics.

During her years with Panic! at the Disco, she was sponsored by the pedal division of EBS Professional Bass Equipment, and used many EBS pedals along with other makes. To fit her hands, she ordered a custom-made bass guitar from Fender: a 30-inch (76.2 cm) short-scale Jazz Bass with five strings. The low B-string was required to play Panic! songs.

Joining Incubus, Row chose to bring two familiar, "comfortable" basses, the Fender Marcus Miller model, and a short-scale 5-string BN5 model custom-made by F Bass. She became an F Bass Artist in August 2023. To honor the sound established by the band's previous bassist, Ben Kenney, she uses a pick on some songs rather than her fingers. She said in September 2024 that she was looking forward to adding more of the slap bass technique used by Incubus's first bassist, Dirk Lance, on nu metal songs such as "A Certain Shade of Green". Row has expanded her pedal collection to its greatest extent with Incubus, having previously been a minimalist: "I was that annoying person who felt all of the sound had to come from their hands." Her pedals now include a Dunlop Mini Crybaby Wah, a Dunlop Volume Pedal Mini, an Electro-Harmonix POG (polyphonic octave generator), an MXR Phaser, an Ibanez Chorus, a Darkglass Vintage Microtubes, an Electro-Harmonix Bass Big Muff, a Darkglass Microtubes B3K, and an MXR Envelope Filter. She sometimes augments her performance with various electronic sounds from a keyboard bass made by Moog Music.

She has played bass guitars made by Kala and Marco Bass Guitars. Under luthier Roger Sadowsky, Row learned how to construct bass guitars, and she began to design her own models with the guidance of L. Ellis Hahn of L.E.H. Guitars.

== Personal life ==
Row is based in Greater Los Angeles with her dog Scout. An outline representing Scout is inlaid into her custom F Bass BN5 instrument. She relaxes by hiking. Row told Pauly Shore in 2022 that her boyfriend was a videographer. She has been seen wearing her older brother Josh's drum key on a necklace; he was a drummer who became addicted to heroin and died in 2010 of an overdose.
