= Chase N. Cashe =

American producer, songwriter, rapper (born 1987)

- Also known as: Chase N. Cashe
- Born: Jesse Woodard IV; September 11, 1987 (age 38); New Orleans, Louisiana, U.S.
- Genres: Hip hop; R&B; pop
- Occupations: Record producer; songwriter; rapper
- Years active: 2007–present
- Labels: Can't Buy Respect Agency; BMI; Crown Bearer; Zone 4; Interscope

Jesse Woodard (born September 11, 1987), also known as Chase N. Cashe, is an American record producer, best known for co-producing Lil Wayne's 2009 single "Drop the World", which peaked within the top 20 of the Billboard Hot 100.

== Career ==
Woodard graduated high school in New Orleans at the time of Hurricane Katrina and was forced to move to Los Angeles in 2006 at 17 after losing his familial home. He began releasing early productions on MySpace, resulting in area artists and producers reaching out to inquire. After one such inquiry, Woodard and fellow producer Hit-Boy would meet to work with new artist Sean Kingston, forming music collective Surf Club. Surf Club would grow to include singer-songwriter Stacy Barthe, Chili Chil, fellow producer Brandon Carrier, and other members.

Woodard next moved to Atlanta where he began ghost-producing for Grand Hustle Records producer Khao, who would pay him a flat $5000 rate for his productions, tweak them, and give Woodard drum production credits. This resulted in his first unofficial placements ("Double Up" from R. Kelly's 2007 studio album Double Up, and "Pak Man" from 2007 Yung Joc album Hustlenomics). Woodard would receive his first official placement working with Hit-Boy, as well as singer Frank Ocean (then known as Christopher Breaux - a fellow co-writer) on Brandy's "1st & Love" from her 2008 album Human.

Other than his early work with Frank Ocean, Woodard is noted for working with rappers Drake, J. Cole, and Kendrick Lamar in the early stages of their respective careers. In 2010, he was mentioned in early Drake cut "9AM in Dallas" from his debut studio album Thank Me Later after motivating him to record the song to a beat Woodard selected from producer Boi-1da and recommended for Drake. In 2012, Woodard released 17-track 'beat-tape' Verde to acclaim. In 2013, he would reunite with founding Surf Club member Hit-Boy to release Beyoncé song "Rise Up" from animated film Epic co-written with Sia. Woodard and Hit-Boy would later reunite again in 2015 for project The Heir Up There 2, before Woodard executive-produced Currensy's 7-track mixtape Cathedral. Rapper Mac Miller surprise-released single "Speed Racer" (produced by Woodard) soon after the release of this third studio album GO:OD AM.

Woodard is also known for various Troy Ave, Young Money Entertainment and The Pussycat Dolls productions.

== Discography ==
- Gumbeaux (2011)
- Charm (2012)
- The Heir Up There (2012)
- Verde (2012)
- Heir Waves (Deluxe Edition) (2013)
- The Best There Is... (2014)
- The Heir Up There 2 (2015)
- Cashe Rules 2 (2016)
- We Never Close 2 (2018)
- Mannie Fest (2019)

== Songwriting and production credits ==
Credits are courtesy of Discogs, Tidal, Apple Music, and AllMusic.

Title	Year	Artist	Album
"1st & Love"	2008	Brandy	Human
"Takin' Over the World"	2008	The Pussycat Dolls	Doll Domination
"Love the Way You Love Me"	2008	The Pussycat Dolls	Doll Domination
"Lay Back & Chill"	2008	Tiffany Evans	Tiffany Evans
"Priceless" (Featuring Birdman)	2008	Flo Rida	Mail on Sunday
"New Shit"	2009	Young Money	We Are Young Money
"Pass the Dutch" (Featuring Short Dawg)	2009	Young Money	We Are Young Money
"F*** da Bullshit" (Featuring Birdman)	2009	Young Money	We Are Young Money
"Get Up, Get Down"	2009	Willy Northpole	Tha Connect
"Top of the World" (featuring Chili Chil)	2009	Rich Boy	More than a Game (soundtrack)
"Drop the World" (Featuring Eminem)	2010	Lil Wayne	Rebirth
"The Sellout"	2010	Macy Gray	The Sellout
"Look What You've Done"	2011	Drake	Take Care
"Neverland"	2011	J. Cole	Any Given Sunday #5
"World Goes Round"	2011	Trouble	December 17th
"I Can't"	2011	Trouble	Green Light
"I Gotta Make A Move" (Featuring Alley Boy)	2011	Trouble	Green Light
"Just Might"	2012	Skeme	Alive & Living
"We Ball" (Featuring Kendrick Lamar)	2012	Dom Kennedy	Yellow Album
"La La La (The Floating Song)"	2012	Machine Gun Kelly	Lace Up (Deluxe)
"Lullaby"	2013	Troy Ave	New York City: The Album
"Rise Up"	2013	Beyoncé	Epic (Soundtrack)
"You Made Me" (Featuring Tish Hyman)	2014	Fabolous	The Young OG Project
"Poet"	2014	Rocko	Poet
"Pain"	2014	Rocko	Poet
"Problems"	2014	Iamsu!	Sincerely Yours
"Do Me No Favors" (Featuring Fabolous and Jadakiss)	2015	Troy Ave	Major Without a Deal
"Taste of Revenge"	2015	Troy Ave	Major Without a Deal
"Your Style (Remix)" (Featuring Puff Daddy, Mase, and T.I.)	2015	Troy Ave	Major Without a Deal
"Here I Am"	2015	Stacy Barthe	Becoming
"Speed Racer"	2015	Mac Miller	Non-album single
"Love Song"	2018	Chico	Steak X Shrimp, Vol. 3
"Commitment"	2021	Lloyd Banks	The Course of the Inevitable

=== Executive-produced projects ===
Albums with more than 90% Chase N. Cashe production/songwriting credits, showing year released and album name
Album	Artist	Year	Label
Cathedral	Currensy	2015	Jet Life Recordings
Green In Gold	Krondon	2015	Premium Sound Company / Crown Bearers Records

== Awards and nominations ==
Year	Ceremony	Award	Result	Ref
2011	BMI 14th Annual Unsigned Urban Showcase	First Place	Won	
