= Younger Now (song) =

2017 single by Miley Cyrus

Single by Miley Cyrus

from the album Younger Now
- Released: August 18, 2017
- Studio: Rainbowland (Malibu)
- Genre: Pop
- Length: 4:08
- Label: RCA
- Composer(s): Miley Cyrus; Oren Yoel
- Lyricist(s): Miley Cyrus
- Producer(s): Oren Yoel; Miley Cyrus

Miley Cyrus singles chronology
"Malibu" (2017)	"Younger Now" (2017)	"Nothing Breaks Like a Heart" (2018)

Music video
- "Younger Now" on YouTube

"Younger Now" is a song by American singer Miley Cyrus, from her sixth studio album of the same name (2017). It was released on August 18, 2017, by RCA Records as the second and final single from the album. Its lyrics were written by Cyrus and its musical composition and production done by Cyrus and Oren Yoel. An accompanying music video was released on the same day.

== Background and release ==
After Miley Cyrus & Her Dead Petz (2015), Cyrus spent time reclaiming her once wholesome image in the run up to her new material, Younger Now. Prior to the album's release on September 29, 2017, Cyrus released "Malibu" as the lead single and "Inspired" a promotional single before unveiling the album's title track as the second single on August 18, 2017, along with its music video. It is a twangy pop song featuring one of her grade school portraits as the cover artwork.

== Composition ==
Younger Now (2017)
A sample of the song, where the chorus can be heard.

The song is performed in the key of A major, with a moderately fast tempo of 122 beats per minute in common time. Cyrus vocals span from E_{3} to Db_{5}. Lyrically, Ben Kate of Consequence of Sound described the track as "a soaring reclamation of changes Cyrus experienced over the last several years, ending with a declaration she now is the best version of herself. 'I'm not afraid of who I used to be / No one stays the same,' she proclaims. 'Change is a thing you can count on / I feel so much younger now'".

== Critical reception ==
USA Today's Maeve McDermott claimed "the song is infinitely more listenable than most of the music from her Dead Petz phase", but criticized Cyrus for "not offering much in the way of meaningful self-reflection on the song".

== Track listing ==
Digital download (the remixes EP)

1. "Younger Now" (R3hab remix) – 2:40
2. "Younger Now" (Niko the Kid remix) – 3:44
3. "Younger Now" (DJ Premier remix) – 2:57
4. "Younger Now" (Burns remix) – 4:23
5. "Younger Now" (Fred Falke remix) – 3:52
6. "Younger Now" (Syn Cole remix) – 3:23

== Live performances ==
Cyrus first performed "Younger Now" at the 2017 MTV Video Music Awards on August 27, featuring a varied array of senior citizen men and women, many of whom in their late eighties, as the main dancers, as well as several young children riding mini-motorcycles. On September 7, Cyrus performed the song on The Ellen DeGeneres Show. She also performed "Younger Now" live for the third time in the BBC Radio 1 Live Lounge, accompanied by other songs like "Malibu", "See You Again", "Party in the U.S.A." and a cover of Roberta Flack's "The First Time Ever I Saw Your Face", the following week.

== Music video ==
=== Background and synopsis ===
Accompanying the song was a music video featuring a "mishmash" of 1950s-inspired imagery. In the video's most on-the-nose moment, one of the sideshow characters populating its carnival setting spins upside down on a stripper pole, as the words "No one stays the same" flash in front. Cyrus helped co-direct the video alongside her friend and collaborator Diane Martel. The video features Cyrus interacting with a puppet of her younger self and dancing with a group of senior citizens.

=== Reception ===
USA Today suggested the stripper scene is "a flashback to Cyrus grinding on Robin Thicke and twerking in the "We Can't Stop" video during her Bangerz years".

== Charts ==
Chart performance for "Younger Now"
Chart (2017)	Peak position
Australia (ARIA)	49
Canada (Canadian Hot 100)	48
France (SNEP Sales Chart)	53
Japan (Japan Hot 100) (Billboard)	64
Sweden (Sverigetopplistan)	75
Portugal (AFP)	92
Switzerland (Schweizer Hitparade)	84
UK Singles (OCC)	54
US Billboard Hot 100	79
US Adult Pop Airplay (Billboard)	39

== Certifications ==
Certifications for "Younger Now"
Region	Certification	Certified units/sales
Australia (ARIA)	Gold	35,000^{‡}
Brazil (Pro-Música Brasil)	Gold	20,000^{‡}
New Zealand (RMNZ)	Gold	15,000^{‡}
Norway (IFPI Norway)	Gold	30,000^{‡}
^{‡} Sales+streaming figures based on certification alone.

== Release history ==
"Younger Now" release history
Region	Date	Format(s)	Version	Label	Ref.
Various	August 18, 2017	Digital download; streaming	Original	RCA	
United States	August 22, 2017	Contemporary hit radio	Original	RCA	
Italy	September 15, 2017	Radio airplay	Original	Sony	
Various	October 5, 2017	Digital download; streaming	The remixes	RCA	
