= Younger Now =

2017 studio album by Miley Cyrus

Studio album by Miley Cyrus
- Released: September 29, 2017
- Recorded: 2016–2017
- Studios: Capitol Studios, United Recording, The Whitley Room (Los Angeles); Rainbowland (Malibu)
- Genres: Country pop; pop rock
- Length: 41:11
- Label: RCA
- Producers: Miley Cyrus; Oren Yoel

Miley Cyrus chronology
Miley Cyrus & Her Dead Petz (2015)	Younger Now (2017)	She Is Coming (2019)

Singles from Younger Now
- 1. "Malibu" Released: May 11, 2017; 2. "Younger Now" Released: August 18, 2017

Younger Now is the sixth studio album by American singer-songwriter Miley Cyrus. It was released on September 29, 2017, by RCA Records. Cyrus began planning a commercial follow-up record to her fourth studio album Bangerz (2013) while simultaneously making her experimental fifth studio album Miley Cyrus & Her Dead Petz (2015), although later became influenced by her reconciliation with fiancé Liam Hemsworth in 2016. Younger Now was written and produced by Cyrus and Oren Yoel, with whom she had collaborated on her previous two full-lengths. Not concerning herself with radio airplay, their efforts resulted in an "honest" final product that sees Cyrus "leaning into her roots." It features guest vocals from singer Dolly Parton, Cyrus' godmother. Musically, it is a country pop and pop rock record.

Younger Now received mixed reviews from music critics, who felt that the songwriting and production lacked substance. It charted at number one in Spain and within the top five in Australia, Canada, Ireland, New Zealand, and the United States while receiving platinum certifications from New Zealand and Norway. "Malibu" and "Younger Now" were released as singles, with the former track being certified double platinum by the Recording Industry Association of America (RIAA) and peaking at number ten on the Billboard Hot 100.

Looking to remove herself from the provocative reputation she had developed while promoting Bangerz and Miley Cyrus & Her Dead Petz, promotional efforts for Younger Now associated Cyrus with an increasingly conservative image. She performed during several television programs, including the Billboard Music Awards and MTV Video Music Awards, before stating the month following the release of the album that she would neither release any further singles from the record nor tour for it, so she could focus on her work on The Voice.

== Background and development ==
After a three-year break from music, Cyrus released her fourth album Bangerz in 2013. She worked with mainstream producers to attract new listeners, and developed a sexually provocative image, which is credited with reviving Cyrus' career and turning her into a pop music icon. She followed that with a psychedelic album, Miley Cyrus & Her Dead Petz, which was released for free on SoundCloud in 2015. It received mixed reviews, and Cyrus generated accusations of cultural appropriation for her wearing dreadlocks during promotional activities for the album. Cyrus also came out as pansexual in 2015, nearly a year after establishing the Happy Hippie Foundation to support homeless and LGBT youth.

Cyrus became a coach on The Voice in 2016, and spent time campaigning for Hillary Clinton during the presidential election after Bernie Sanders, the candidate Cyrus originally endorsed, lost the Democratic nomination to Clinton. Cyrus admitted to being saddened by Clinton's loss, inspiring her to write songs like Inspired.

Two weeks before Younger Now was released, Cyrus stated that she was "over [the album]" and was "already two songs deep on the next one," which would become the EP She Is Coming (2019). In December 2018, Cyrus acknowledged that the musical direction of Younger Now "wasn't exactly the home for [her]" and credited producer Mark Ronson with "[helping her] carve out [her] sound, where [she] could do everything that [she wanted], which is more modern" for the follow-up record. She later stated that elements of the follow-up album could be related to the "country-influenced things that [she] did on Younger Now."

== Composition ==
Younger Now is considered a country pop and pop rock record. It written by Cyrus and Oren Yoel, with whom Cyrus first collaborated on the Bangerz track "Adore You" in 2013.

== Promotion ==
=== Release ===
"[Cyrus' mother Tish] was like, 'When you were a little girl, all you wanted to do was wear high heels and tights.' I wanted to be so mature. And she said, 'I swear to God, you are younger now than you were years ago,' And it just hit me: I am fucking younger now, and I am proud of that."

— Cyrus describing the meaning of the album title to Billboard magazine

Cyrus' then-untitled sixth studio album was first discussed in a Billboard cover story published in May 2017. On August 7, she announced that the record would be titled Younger Now and would be released on September 29. It was made available for preorder on August 18. The album was available on CD, digital download, and streaming on the release date; a vinyl pressing followed on February 9, 2018.

=== Singles ===
The lead single "Malibu" was announced on May 3, 2017, and released with its music video on May 11. It debuted at number 64 on the US Billboard Hot 100, and peaked at number ten the following week. The track was certified double-platinum by the Recording Industry Association of America (RIAA) in January 2019. The second and final single, title track "Younger Now", was released with its music video on August 18. It peaked at number 79 on the Billboard Hot 100. Promotional singles "Inspired" and "Week Without You" were released on June 9 and September 21, respectively. On October 30, Cyrus confirmed there would be no further singles and that she would not be touring in support of Younger Now.

=== Live performances ===
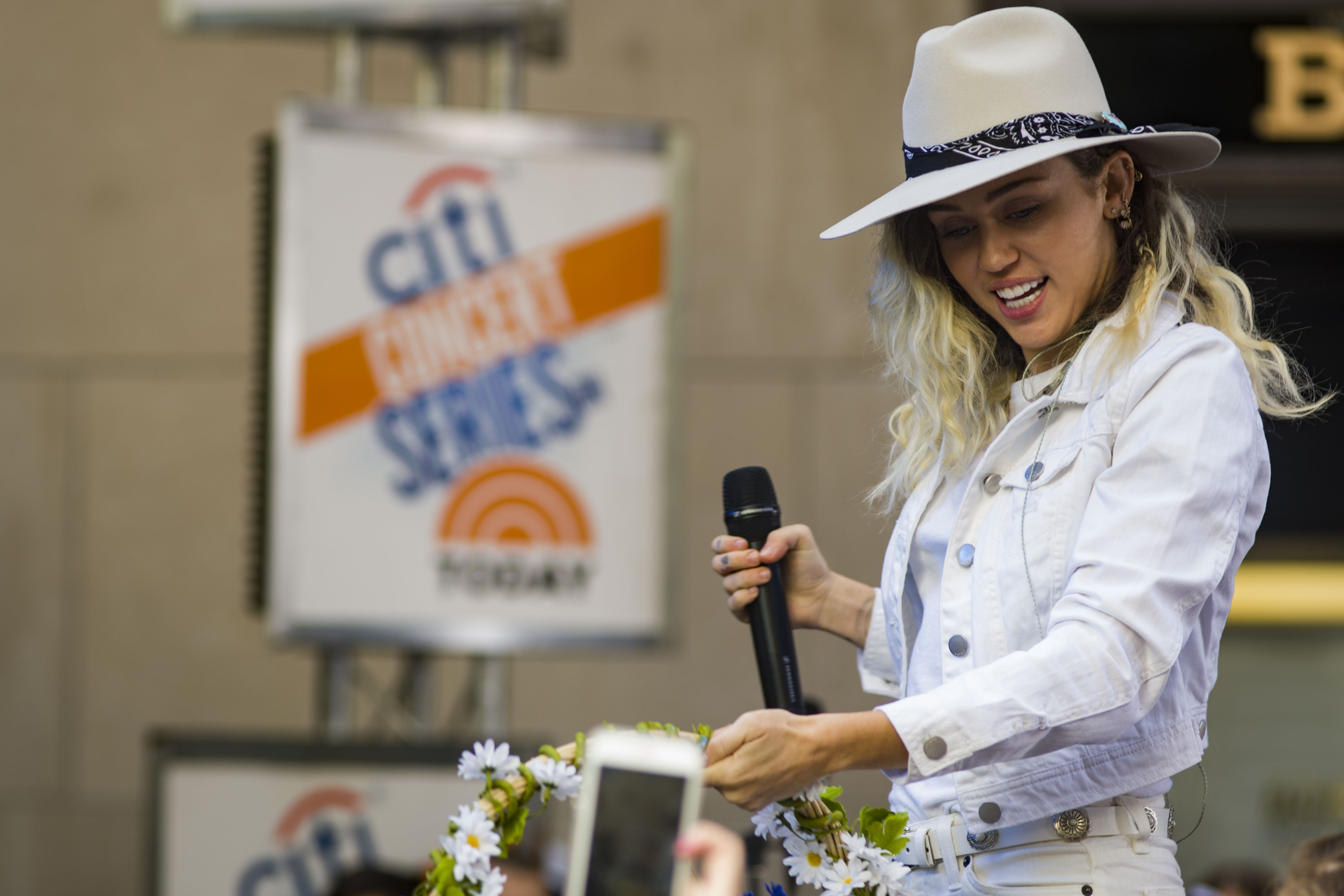
Cyrus performing in New York City on Today, May 2017

Cyrus first performed the album's lead single, "Malibu", at Wango Tango on May 13. She sang "Malibu" again at the Billboard Music Awards and The Voice on May 21 and 22, respectively. She performed the song again on The Today Show on May 26 as a part of their Citi Concert series. That same day, she also made a surprise guest appearance on The Tonight Show Starring Jimmy Fallon to promote her musical guest spot on Late Night with Seth Meyers later that night. Cyrus was also a performer at the One Love Manchester benefit concert on June 4. Cyrus performed "Malibu" and "Inspired" on Fallon on June 14. On August 22, Cyrus launched a website, youngernow.com, where fans could upload photos onto the artwork of the "Younger Now" single. On August 27, Cyrus performed "Younger Now" for the first time at the MTV Video Music Awards. On September 7, Cyrus performed the song on The Ellen DeGeneres Show.

From October 2 to October 6, Cyrus made appearances on The Tonight Show Starring Jimmy Fallon and performed "Week Without You". On November 4, she performed "Bad Mood" and "I Would Die for You" on Saturday Night Live.

== Critical reception ==
Professional ratings
Aggregate scores
Source	Rating
AnyDecentMusic?	5.4/10
Metacritic	58/100
Review scores
Source	Rating
AllMusic	3.5/5 stars
Consequence of Sound	C−
Entertainment Weekly	B
The Guardian	3/5 stars
The Independent	3/5 stars
NME	4/5 stars
Pitchfork	4.7/10
Slant Magazine	3/5 stars

At Metacritic, Younger Now received a weighted score of 58 out of 100 from review aggregate website Metacritic, indicating "mixed or average reviews", based on 17 reviews from music critics. Stephen Thomas Erlewine of AllMusic gave Younger Now 3.5 stars out of 5, saying the album "seems slightly scattered as it flits from song to song, it nevertheless adds up to a portrait of a pop star so confident of her swagger, she doesn't bother with such niceties as old-fashioned flow." Dave Simpson of The Guardian opined, "On Younger Now, she has taken control of the songwriting and production and emerges as a conservative, big-lunged, country-tinged pop star with songs about breaking free." Pitchfork writer Claire Lobenfeld rated the album 4.7 out of 10, complaining that "Bland production and weak songwriting hamstring the personalized nature of Younger Now, making it merely a suggestion of the kind of artist Miley Cyrus could be." Spin's Jordan Sargent called Younger Now Cyrus' "least honest album ever", further stating: "Where her past albums felt messy but painfully sincere, Younger Now comes off as safe and overly sanitized, with the frisson that made Cyrus a star all but entirely blasted away." Billboard highlighted the progressive nature of one of the tracks, "She's Not Him", by saying it legitimizes bisexual and pansexual identities.

=== Controversies ===
Cyrus' comments on growing distant from hip hop culture in her Billboard cover story sparked controversy in May 2017. That month, she clarified that "[she] respects all artists who speak their truth and appreciate all genres of music" and elaborated on her preference for "uplifting, conscious rap", citing Kendrick Lamar as an example, over the sex- and materialism-based lyrics that she explained "pushed [her] out of the hip-hop scene a little" in the article. Cyrus issued another apology in the comments of a YouTube video titled "Miley Cyrus Is My Problematic Fav...Sorry" in June 2019, where she wrote that "[she] fucked up and [she] sincerely apologizes" and expressed regret that "[her] words became a divider in a time where togetherness and unity is crucial."

In March 2023, teachers at an elementary school in Waukesha County, Wisconsin were ordered to remove the song "Rainbowland", a duet between Cyrus and Dolly Parton, from a program in which it was to be performed by first grade students. School district administration issued a statement that said the song's lyrics “could be deemed controversial” according to a school board policy on controversial issues in the classroom. The teacher who selected the song said the lyrics promote "love and acceptance" of all types of people and believes the school board's objection was due to the possibility the song could be interpreted to promote acceptance of LGBTQ people.

== Commercial performance ==
Younger Now debuted at number five on the US Billboard 200 with first-week figures of 45,000 album-equivalent units, of which 33,000 were traditional sales. It placed behind Shania Twain's Now (137,000 units), Tom Petty and the Heartbreakers' Greatest Hits (84,000 units), Demi Lovato's Tell Me You Love Me (74,000 units), and A Boogie wit da Hoodie's The Bigger Artist (67,000 units). The charting earned Cyrus her eleventh top-ten entry in the United States, including material she recorded as Hannah Montana, and marked her first entry there since Bangerz debuted at number one in 2013. In its second week on the chart, Younger Now fell to number 36. As of April 2023, the album has been certified gold by the Recording Industry Association of America (RIAA) for selling over 500,000 copies.

Younger Now debuted at number eight on the UK Albums Chart with 10,024 copies sold in its first week, becoming her fifth top 10 album in the United Kingdom. It also became her fourth top 10 album in Australia after Breakout (which topped the charts), Can't Be Tamed (which reached number four), and Bangerz (which also reached the top position), entering at number two on the ARIA Albums Chart. The record became her eighth overall top 10 entry in Canada, combining both music under her real name and while performing as the character Hannah Montana, debuting at number three in the country.

By June 2023, the album surpassed 1 billion streams on Spotify, which makes it her 6th project to achieve this milestone.

== Track listing ==
All tracks are written by Miley Cyrus and Oren Yoel, with an additional writing credit by Dolly Parton on “Rainbowland”.

Younger Now track listing
No.	Title	Length
1.	"Younger Now"	4:08
2.	"Malibu"	3:51
3.	"Rainbowland" (featuring Dolly Parton)	4:25
4.	"Week Without You"	3:44
5.	"Miss You So Much"	4:53
6.	"I Would Die for You"	2:53
7.	"Thinkin'"	4:05
8.	"Bad Mood"	2:59
9.	"Love Someone"	3:19
10.	"She's Not Him"	3:33
11.	"Inspired"	3:21
Total length:		41:11

=== Notes ===
- Japanese edition includes the Tiësto Remix of "Malibu".

== Credits and personnel ==
Credits adapted from AllMusic.

- Miley Cyrus – vocals, writer, producer, executive producer, art direction, design
- Oren Yoel – producer, writer, instrumentation, horn arrangements, string arrangements
- Dolly Parton – vocals, writer (track 3)
- Jamie Arentzen – guitar
- Jaco Caraco – guitar
- Nicole Row – bass (track 11)
- Paul Dateh – violin
- Jerry Johnson – cello
- Matt Walker – cello
- Taylor Andrew Covey – trombone
- Antoine Séverman – fiddle
- Adam Wolf – French horn
- Harris Majors Ostrander – trumpet
- Paul Franklin – pedal steel
- Stacy Jones – drum, musical director
- Doran Dina – engineer
- Tom Rutledge – vocal engineer
- Paul David Hager – mixing, engineer
- Manny Marroquin – mixing
- Chris Galland – mixing engineer
- Jeff Fitzpatrick – assistant engineer
- Scott Moore – assistant engineer
- Mark Ralston – assistant engineer
- Scott Desmarais – mixing assistant
- Robin Florent – mixing assistant
- Dave Kutch – mastering
- Pres Rodriguez – art direction, design
- Olivia Malone – cover art, photography
- Brian Bowen-Smith – photography
- Liam Hemsworth – photography
- Ryan Kenny – photography

== Charts ==
=== Weekly charts ===
Weekly chart performance for Younger Now
Chart (2017)	Peak position
Australian Albums (ARIA)	2
Austrian Albums (Ö3 Austria)	8
Belgian Albums (Ultratop Flanders)	17
Belgian Albums (Ultratop Wallonia)	21
Canadian Albums (Billboard)	3
Czech Albums (ČNS IFPI)	9
Danish Albums (Hitlisten)	25
Dutch Albums (Album Top 100)	11
French Albums (SNEP)	51
German Albums (Offizielle Top 100)	16
Greek Albums (IFPI)	25
Hungarian Albums (MAHASZ)	35
Irish Albums (IRMA)	5
Italian Albums (FIMI)	9
Japanese Albums (Oricon)	44
Japanese Hot Albums (Billboard Japan)	97
Mexican Albums (AMPROFON)	11
New Zealand Albums (RMNZ)	4
Norwegian Albums (VG-lista)	9
Polish Albums (ZPAV)	19
Portuguese Albums (AFP)	6
Scottish Albums (Official Charts)	7
Slovak Albums (ČNS IFPI)	8
South Korean Albums (Gaon)	81
Spanish Albums (Promusicae)	1
Swedish Albums (Sverigetopplistan)	11
Swiss Albums (Schweizer Hitparade)	11
UK Albums (Official Charts)	8
US Billboard 200	5

=== Monthly charts ===
Monthly chart performance for Younger Now
Chart (2017)	Peak position
Argentine Albums (CAPIF)	5

== Certifications ==
Region	Certification	Certified units/sales
Brazil (Pro-Música Brasil)	Gold	20,000^{‡}
Canada (Music Canada)	Gold	40,000^{‡}
Mexico (AMPROFON)	Gold	30,000^{‡}
New Zealand (RMNZ)	Platinum	15,000^{‡}
Norway (IFPI Norway)	Platinum	20,000^{‡}
Poland (ZPAV)	Gold	10,000^{‡}
United States (RIAA)	Gold	500,000^{‡}
^{‡} Sales+streaming figures based on certification alone.

== Release history ==
Region	Date	Edition	Format(s)	Label	Ref.
Various	September 29, 2017	Standard	CD; digital download	RCA	
Various	February 9, 2018	Standard	LP	RCA	
