= New York City: The Album =

Studio album by Troy Ave
- Released: November 4, 2013
- Recorded: 2013
- Genres: East coast hip hop; hardcore hip hop
- Length: 63:55
- Label: BSB Records
- Producers: Troy Ave (exec.); AraabMuzik; Chase N. Cashe; DJ Uneek; Harry Fraud; John Scino; Mally The Martian; Marcè Reazon; Myles William; Prime & Keyz; Reefa; Rubi Rosa; Scram Jones; Sledgren; Yankee

Troy Ave chronology
BSB Vol. 3 (2013)	New York City: The Album (2013)	Major Without a Deal (2015)

New York City: The Album is the debut studio album by American rapper Troy Ave. It was released on November 4, 2013, by BSB Records. The album features guest appearances from King Sevin, N.O.R.E., Prodigy, Raekwon, DJ Uneek, Pusha T and Young Lito.

== Critical reception ==
Professional ratings
Review scores
Source	Rating
HipHopDX	4/5 stars
XXL	4/5 (XL)

Bruce Smith of HipHopDX praised Ave for displaying his "wittiness and overall personality" throughout the record without coming across as "formulaic" when telling different hip-hop stories, saying: "Without feeling forced, Troy Ave has created an album that is sure to give New Yorkers something to be proud of, and those outside of the five boroughs something resembling the music they most likely also loved from the NYC." Despite finding it over-long in its "drug-fueled rap" track listing and narrow in its NYC viewpoint, Brian Josephs of XXL praised Ave's "street narratives and braggadocios barks" he delivers with an assured vibe and the overall self-awareness throughout the album's "standard humanizing introspective cuts" ("Regretful" and "Mama Tears"), saying that "New York City: The Album isn't the sound of an album that's all that interested in the progressive rap conversation or even finding its own place in that conversation. It's an insular affair that recalls the cold ruthlessness and chest-beating confidence required to take over a turn of the millennium Brooklyn.

== Track listing ==
No.	Title	Producer(s)	Length
1.	"Classic Feel"	Mally The Martian	3:27
2.	"Cigar Smoke" (featuring King Sevin)	Scram Jones	4:15
3.	"Divas & Dimes"	John Scino	3:25
4.	"New York City" (featuring Raekwon, N.O.R.E., and Prodigy)	John Scino	5:14
5.	"Mama Tears"	John Scino	3:27
6.	"Viking"	Marcè Reazon	3:28
7.	"Me Against The World" (featuring Mila Brown)	Prime & Keyz	4:50
8.	"My Grind"	Rubi Rosa	3:48
9.	"Your Style"	Yankee	3:20
10.	"Piggy Bank"	Harry Fraud	3:34
11.	"Lullaby"	Chase N. Cashe	3:34
12.	"Hot Out"	Scram Jones	2:58
13.	"Everything" (featuring Pusha T)	DJ Uneek	2:50
14.	"I Know Why You Mad"	Meth	3:16
15.	"Regretful"	AraabMuzik	6:16
16.	"Beneath Me"	Sledgren	3:44
17.	"I'm Dat Nigga" (featuring Young Lito)	Reefa; Myles William; Stats	5:49

iTunes bonus track
No.	Title	Producer(s)	Length
18.	"Hurt"	Scram Jones	3:44
