= Dollywood Foundation =

US non-profit organization

- The Dollywood Foundation Logo
- Formation: 1988
- Founder: Dolly Parton
- Headquarters: Sevierville, Tennessee
- Location: United States
- Key people: Jeff Conyers (President)
- Website: dollywoodfoundation.org

The Dollywood Foundation is an American non-profit organization founded by Dolly Parton in 1988 and headquartered in Sevierville, Tennessee. The foundation was established to support educational opportunities for children in Sevier County, Tennessee, Parton's home county. The president of the Dollywood Company is Jeff Conyers as of 2026.

The foundation operates Dolly Parton's Imagination Library, a children's program established in 1995 that provides participating children with a free, age-appropriate book each month from birth until age five. The foundation also operates scholarships and awards programs, and provides support to numerous non-profit organizations that aim to improve the quality of life of children and others in need.

== History ==
=== Founding ===
Dolly Parton established the Dollywood Foundation in April 1988 to improve educational opportunities for children in Sevier County, Tennessee. The foundation initially focused on increasing high-school graduation rates and encouraging local students to remain in school.

=== Buddy Program ===
On April 29, 1988, Parton kicked off the Buddy Program, which partnered seventh and eighth grade students with a friend to act as each other's motivational "buddy" to remain in school through graduation. Students who graduated received $500 from Parton.

In the spring of 1992, the first class of graduating buddies each received their $500, with former Tennessee Governor and then U.S. Secretary of Education Lamar Alexander in attendance.

The foundation reported that the dropout rate among the participating classes decreased from 35 percent to 6 percent during the program's implementation.

=== Dolly Parton's Imagination Library ===
External videos
- "Dolly Parton's Imagination Library's 100 Millionth Book Donation", U.S. Library of Congress, February 27, 2018, C-SPAN

In November 1995, Parton launched Dolly Parton's Imagination Library, a free children's book gifting program, in Sevier County, Tennessee. The charity was started as a tribute to Parton's father, whose "inability to read probably kept him from fulfilling all of his dreams."

The program operates through partnerships between the Dollywood Foundation and local organizations. The foundation provides administrative support and negotiates book pricing, while local partners raise funds to cover the wholesale and mailing costs associated with children in their communities. In 1996, the first Imagination Library books were distributed to children in Sevier County. By 2000, the foundation expanded to establish partnerships with other local communities. The Imagination Library distributed one million books by 2003, expanded state-wide by 2004, and has since expanded to over 1,800 local communities in the US, Canada, Australia, Ireland and the United Kingdom.

The Library of Congress hosted an event in February 2018 commemorating the 100 millionth book distributed by the Imagination Library. At the event, Parton held a Story Time for children attending the event. In 2021, the number was nearly 155 million. As of 2026, the program delivered books to over 120 million children.

As of 2021, at least 1.7 million children in the U.S. were enrolled in the program, with a net monthly increase of 20,000 to 30,000 children. The Imagination Library program sends roughly 3 million books to children every month, including bilingual and braille books.

In 2026, the Imagination Library was one of the beneficiaries of Taylor Swift and Travis Kelce's $26 million charity wedding donations, receiving $2 million from the newlyweds. Parton took to Instagram to thank the couple for making "giving back a key part of your lives."

=== My People Fund ===
In November 2016, two teenage boys were charged with setting a fire in the Great Smoky Mountains National Park, known as the 2016 Great Smoky Mountains wildfires, which killed fourteen people, including two children, and burned down thousands of homes and businesses. Charges against the two juvenile suspects were later dropped due to insufficient evidence. Dolly gathered her Dollywood companies – Dolly Parton’s Stampede, Dolly Parton’s Lumberjack Adventure, Pirates Voyage, and The Dollywood Company – to establish the ‘My People Fund,’ which ultimately donated $1,000 per month to Sevier County households who lost their homes in the fire. Those collecting charitable donations from the Dollywood Foundation could collect their funds for up to six months. Significant donors to the fund included Verizon, Tanger Outlets, Miley Cyrus’ Happy Hippie Foundation, CoreCivic, and The Blalock Company. The My People Fund raised over $9 million and assisted more than 900 families.

== Scholarships and awards ==
Having graduated from Sevier County High School in 1964, Dolly Parton launched The Dollywood Foundation in 1988 with the initial intention of raising scholarship funds for local high school students. The Dolly Parton Scholarship was first offered in August 2000 to a Sevier County High School student. The scholarship would grant a total of $15,000 per student. With further sponsorship, the scholarship was later offered to four additional high schools, including Pigeon Forge High School, Seymour High School, Northview Academy, and Gatlinburg-Pittman. Additional scholarships have been created over the years.

When the Imagination Library reached its 100-million total book distribution mark, Dolly Parton announced she would be awarding a scholarship to a participant in the library’s program. In November 2016, Parton granted a $30,000 scholarship to a two-year-old girl, one of the library’s newest participants. The little girl was announced as the winner during the Pure & Simple Tour stop in Pigeon Forge, Tennessee. The money was placed in an account that will hold the money until the girl enrolls in college. The scholarship, after the 16-year wait, will amount to nearly $50,000.

The Chasing Rainbows Award was created by the National Network of State Teachers of the Year (NNSTOY) in Parton's name. First presented to Parton in 2002, the award is now given annually to a deserving teacher who has overcome hardship. The Imagination Library has since partnered with the NNSTOY.

== Impact ==
By 2006, the Dollywood Foundation’s Imagination Library had spread to 471 communities in 41 states. The overall rating of the organization was given 4 out of 4 stars by Charity Navigator. The program later expanded to the United Kingdom, Republic of Ireland, Australia, and Canada. The program helps about 1 million children each month.

Following Parton's death in August 2026, commentators widely cited the Imagination Library as one of her most enduring legacies, with several outlets noting that the program's continued growth and reach had come to overshadow even her musical catalogue in discussions of her impact. Parton's family requested that, in lieu of flowers, donations be directed to the Imagination Library or its local partner organizations.
