= Major Without a Deal =

Studio album by Troy Ave
- Released: June 5, 2015
- Recorded: 2014–2015
- Genre: Hip-hop
- Length: 1:06:37
- Label: BSB; EMPIRE
- Producer: Chase N. Cashe; John Scino; Kid Capri; Rubirosa; Ted Smooth; Tha Bizness; Troy Ave; Yaiquab; Yankee; Roofeo

Troy Ave chronology
New York City: The Album (2013)	Major Without a Deal (2015)

Major Without a Deal is the second studio album by American rapper Troy Ave. It was released on June 5, 2015, through BSB Records with distribution via EMPIRE. Produced by Yankee, Chase N. Cashe, Rubirosa, John Scino, Kid Capri, Ted Smoove, Tha Bizness, Yaiquab and Troy Ave himself, it features guest appearances from A$AP Ferg, Cam'Ron, Fat Joe, Jadakiss, Puff Daddy, Snoop Dogg, Ty Dolla $ign Ma$e, as well as others.

The album debuted at number 109 on the Billboard 200, number 14 on both the Top R&B/Hip-Hop Albums and the Independent Albums, and number 13 on the Top Rap Albums charts in the United States.

== Critical reception ==
Professional ratings
Aggregate scores
Source	Rating
Metacritic	61/100
Review scores
Source	Rating
AllMusic	3.5/5 stars
Complex	2.5/5 stars
HipHopDX	2.5/5
RapReviews	3.5/10
XXL	XL (4/5)

Major Without a Deal was met with generally favorable reviews from music critics. At Metacritic, which assigns a normalized rating out of 100 to reviews from mainstream publications, the album received an average score of 61, based on five reviews.

Roger Krastz of XXL praised the album, calling it "another step forward for Troy Ave, but it's also another win for the birthplace of hip-hop". AllMusic's David Jeffries described it as "an album that effortlessly jumps between the hardcore and the hilarious", stating: "the LP presents Troy as a punchline-dealing party gangsta who knows the power of a good hook".

In mixed reviews, Craig Jenkins of Complex resumed: "Major Without a Deal's concept songs miss almost as much as they hit". Jesse Fairfax of HipHopDX wrote: "Troy Ave's self-confidence skews towards myopic arrogance, as high points like "Young King" are practically ruined by intentionally off-key vocal melodies and "Real Nigga" comes off as Maybach Music Group karaoke".

Grant Jones of RapReviews found the album's production is predictable, yet "strong enough as a platform for a dope emcee to weave their words on", concluding: "the real reason this album is disappointing is because Troy Ave is completely unremarkable as an emcee. He's a hollow rapper with no unique trait or style".

== Track listing ==
No.	Title	Producer(s)	Length
1.	"Quarter Million" (featuring Cam'Ron)	Ted Smooth	3:08
2.	"I'm Bout It" (featuring Fat Joe)	Yankee	3:39
3.	"Young King"	Yankee; Troy Ave	3:31
4.	"Real One / Real Nigga"	Yankee; Troy Ave	4:31
5.	"Doo Doo"	Tha Bizness	2:59
6.	"Bang Bang" (featuring 50 Cent)	Yankee; Troy Ave	3:05
7.	"A Bronx Tale"	Kid Capri	3:22
8.	"Love You/How I'm on It" (featuring Lil Twin Contraban)	Rubirosa	6:23
9.	"Fake Butt Busta"	Rubirosa	3:34
10.	"Do Betta" (featuring Ty$)		4:55
11.	"Finagle the Bagel" (featuring Young Lito)	Yankee	3:12
12.	"Gimmie That" (featuring A$AP Ferg and Young Lito)	Yaiquab	3:55
13.	"Do Me No Favors" (featuring Fabolous and Jadakiss)	Chase N. Cashe	3:39
14.	"Anytime" (featuring Snoop Dogg)	John Scino	4:04
15.	"Taste of Revenge"	Chase N. Cashe	3:50
16.	"All About the Money" (featuring Young Jeezy and Rick Ross)	Roofeo; Yankee	4:51
17.	"Your Style (Remix)" (featuring Puff Daddy, Ma$e and T.I.)	Chase N. Cashe	5:07
Total length:			1:06:37

== Charts ==
Chart (2015)	Peak position
US Billboard 200	109
US Top R&B/Hip-Hop Albums (Billboard)	14
US Top Rap Albums (Billboard)	13
US Independent Albums (Billboard)	14
