= Benny Cassette =

American record producer

- Also known as: Benn Good
- Origin: Los Angeles, California, U.S.
- Genres: Hip hop; pop; rock
- Occupations: Record producer; rapper; singer; songwriter
- Instrument: D.A.W.
- Website: bennycassette.com

Benny Cassette (born in Los Angeles) is an American record producer, rapper, singer, and songwriter. Signed to Kanye West's Very Good Beats as a producer since 2013, he worked on Kanye West's Yeezus and The Life of Pablo albums among other collaborative projects with artists including SZA, Earthgang, Isaiah Rashad, Diana Gordon, Jacob Banks and Ciara among others.

In 2018 Cassette began to release work as a solo artist under the name Benn Good. His first body of work included features from Isaiah Rashad and BJ The Chicago Kid.

== Early life ==
Benny Cassette was born in Los Angeles, California. Neither of his parents were involved in the music industry; his father worked as an architect. Cassette was nonetheless exposed to the diverse local music. He has stated, "I came up in the LA hip hop scene listening to N.W.A and the Beastie Boys. On top of that, I grew up in a Latino neighborhood where I heard salsa, ranchero and oldies. At home, my dad listened to jazz, and at school kids either played rap at lunchtime, or rock after school." In high school he began rapping as part of a youth performance group, which inspired him to consider pursuing music as a career. He toured with the group during his summers, performing at diverse locations, including prisons. He stated, "I learned real quick how to cover stuff up because if you mess up there, on stage, you get booed."

== Career ==
=== 2013–2014: Early work and G.O.O.D. Music ===
In 2013 Cassette signed with G.O.O.D. Music as a producer. His first project was Kanye West's Yeezus album. Cassette has since collaborated with artists and friends such as Miguel, John Legend, SZA, EarthGang, Eric Bellinger, the Band Perry, Burna Boy, and Bree Runway.

On April 1, 2014, Cassette released two official remixes of Sky Ferreira songs: "I Blame Myself" and "You're Not the One." Both songs were originally on Ferreira's 2013 debut Night Time, My Time, and the remixes were exclusively released through Spin Magazine. Spin said, "Cassette bolsters the tight snares of the singer's 'I Blame Myself' into a trap-addled bounce and softens the lovelorn 'You're Not the One' into a breezy, skip-along groove."

In 2014, Cassette co-wrote, co-produced, and co-executive produced the Mary Lambert album Heart on My Sleeve, which she recorded for Capitol Records. He co-wrote the album track "Secrets" with Lambert, Eric Rosse, and MoZella. The single was released in early August 2014, along with the track "When You Sleep."

In 2015, Cassette began working with SZA. on currently unreleased songs.

In 2019, Cassette worked as a producer on "Collide" and "My Money, My Baby" off Queen & Slim (soundtrack), which was released in November through Motown Records. The former went on to be nominated for Best R&B Song at the 63rd annual GRAMMY Awards.

=== 2014–present: Artist projects ===
External videos
- "Raging Bull" Music Video on MTVu (May 30, 2014)

In 2014 Cassette released the song "Raging Bull," which "features Benny Cassette's own vocals over his synthesized and drum-pounding production", and which was followed by a music video. About Cassette's production, AFRSH.com wrote that Cassette "has mastered a distinct hybrid of hip-hop, alternative and pop music (which is evident on ("Raging Bull") that proves utterly infectious."

Around 2014, Cassette announced several upcoming EPs. In September 2014, Cassette released his single "Virgo Season," which featured Isaiah Rashad. He premiered the music video for his "Sex and Faith" single in December. In May 2016, Benny released "Entertain Us", the first single off his upcoming album Broken Hearts and Dollar Signs. It reached No. 6 on the Billboard Viral Spotify 50 chart.

On May 27, 2021, Cassette released his EP 'Love God Get Money' under his artist name Benn Good on Capitol Records. The title track was the leading single off the 7-track EP and debuted with an official music video.

== Personal life ==
Cassette continues to live in his hometown of Los Angeles, and remains involved in the local music scene there. He is a follower of the Baháʼí Faith, with which community he remains involved. He frequently participates in Baháʼí activities and Baháʼí community life.

== Discography ==
=== Singles (as Benn Good) ===
Year	Title	Album	Notes
2014	"Raging Bull"	Non-album singles	Music video (MTVu, VEVO)
2014	"Virgo Season" (featuring Isaiah Rashad)	Non-album singles	September 2014
2014	"Sex and Faith"	Non-album singles	Music video (December 2014)

=== Albums (as Benn Good) ===
Year	Title
2021	Love God, Get Money EP

=== Remixes ===
Year	Title	Artist
2014	"You're Not the One"	Sky Ferreira
2014	"I Blame Myself"	Sky Ferreira
2014	"You And I"	John Legend

=== Collaborations ===
Year	Releases	Release details
2012	Angel Dust EP (with Chuck Inglish)	October 30, 2012

=== Production credits ===
==== Albums ====
Year	Release	Artist(s)	Notes
2014	Convertibles	Chuck Inglish	Engineer, featured artist, vocals
2014	Heart on My Sleeve	Mary Lambert	Co-producer, co-writer
2014	R.P.Y.	Moxie	Co-producer
2020	A Motown Holiday	Tiana Major9, Asiahn, Njomza	Co-producer, co-writer

==== Songs ====
Year	Single name	Primary artist(s)	Album	Role
2013	"Black Skinhead"	Kanye West	Yeezus	Co-producer
2013	"New Slaves"	Kanye West	Yeezus	Co-producer
2013	"Hold My Liquor"	Kanye West	Yeezus	Co-producer
2013	"Send It Up"	Kanye West	Yeezus	Co-producer
2014	"Secrets"	Mary Lambert	Heart on My Sleeve	Co-producer, co-writer
2014	"When You Sleep"	Mary Lambert	Heart on My Sleeve	Co-Producer
2014	"No Good In Goodnight"	Ferras	Ferras (EP)	Producer
2014	"Honey Dip"	Dev	Bittersweet July	Producer
2015	"nwa" (featuring Kurupt)	Miguel	WILDHEART	Co-producer, Co-writer
2015	"You Wonder Why?"	Stacy Barthe	BEcoming	Producer
2015	"Barbwire"	Allen Stone	Radius	Producer
2015	"Freedom"	Allen Stone	Radius	Producer
2015	"Bleeding Out"	Diana Gordon	Five Needle EP	Producer
2015	"Home"	Diana Gordon	Five Needle EP	Co-producer
2015	"World On Fire"	Diana Gordon	Five Needle EP	Co-producer
2016	"Comeback Kid"	The Band Perry	Non-album singles	Co-producer
2017	"Close Your Eyes"	The All-American Rejects	Non-album singles	Producer, Co-Writer
2018	"Monster"	Jacob Banks	Non-album singles	Co-producer
2018	"Love Ain't Enough"	Jacob Banks	Non-album singles	Co-producer
2019	"I Love Myself"	Ciara	Beauty Marks	Co-producer, Co-writer
2019	"Na Na"	Ciara	Beauty Marks	Co-producer, Co-writer
2019	"Collide"	Tiana Major9, EarthGang	Queen & Slim: The Soundtrack	Co-producer, Co-writer
2019	"My Money, My Baby"	Burna Boy	Queen & Slim: The Soundtrack	Co-producer, Co-writer
2020	"Think About You"	Tiana Major9	At Sixes And Sevens EP	Co-producer, Co-writer
2020	"fade away"	kai	like water EP	Co-producer, Co-writer
