= Becoming (Stacy Barthe album) =

BEcoming
- Creative Direction & Design by Joe Perez

Studio album by Stacy Barthe
- Released: July 10, 2015
- Genres: r&b; soul
- Length: 62:59
- Labels: Motown; Homeschool
- Producers: John Legend (exec.); Malay (exec.); Stacy Barthe (exec.); Eddie Blackmon (exec.); Hit-Boy; Oren Yoel; DJ Camper; Ran Pink; Dirty Harry; James Poyser; Benny Cassette; The ClassMatez

Stacy Barthe chronology
P.S. I Love You (2013)	BEcoming (2015)	FKA Stacy Barthe (2016)

Singles from BEcoming
- 1. "War IV Love" Released: March 18, 2014; 2. "Flawed Beautiful Creatures" Released: December 15, 2014; 3. "Angel" Released: December 23, 2014; 4. "Live For Today" Released: January 15, 2015; 5. "You Wonder Why?" Released: June 29, 2015

Becoming (stylized as BEcoming) is the debut studio album by Haitian American singer and songwriter Stacy Barthe. It was released on July 10, 2015, by Motown and Homeschool Records. It features guest appearances from John Legend and Common.

== Release and promotion ==
To help promote the album's long-awaited release, a 6-track sampler was uploaded to SoundCloud on December 22, 2014. BEcoming was officially released for digital download and streaming on July 10, 2015, by Motown and John Legend's Homeschool Records. A short film of the same name was released on July 14, 2015—documenting Barthe's struggles with depression, attempted suicide, and weight loss journey.

=== Singles ===
"War IV Love" was released on March 18, 2014, as the album's lead single. "Flawed Beautiful Creatures" was released as the album's second single on December 15, 2014. Both "War IV Love" and "Flawed Beautiful Creatures"—along with non-album cut, "Extraordinary Love"—were featured on BET's NAACP award-winning drama series, Being Mary Jane. A cover of Anita Baker's "Angel", featuring John Legend, was released as the album's third single on December 23, 2014. An abridged version of the cover first appeared on John Legend's fourth studio album, Love in the Future, as an interlude. "Live For Today", featuring Common, was released as the album's fourth single on January 15, 2015. The fifth and final single released was "You Wonder Why?" on June 29, 2015. The single would become Barthe's highest performing release, peaking at number twenty-three on US Billboard's Adult R&B Songs.

== Critical reception ==
Professional ratings
Review scores
Source	Rating
AllMusic	4/5 stars
The Irish Times	4/5 stars
YourMusicMyWorld	4/5 stars

Upon its release, BEcoming received positive reviews from critics. Bobby Carter of npr music proclaimed, "BEcoming is all about brutal, fearless honesty ... when taken as a whole, it feels like a powerful and necessary purge." Gail Mitchell of Billboard described BEcoming as "a powerful, raw narrative about the joys and pains of life." Online R&B publication ThisIsR&B praised the album, stating: "Stacy didn’t simply record an album. Rather she penned an often raw, always real, and undeniably riveting audio diary—recounting her own unbelievable, yet universal story."

=== Year-end lists ===
Publication	List	Year	Ref.
BET	The Best R&B Albums of 2015	2015	
WDET	New Soul Sunday's Best of 2015	2015	

== Legacy ==
In response to the stay-at-home orders enacted to suppress the COVID-19 pandemic in the United States, the New York Post listed BEcoming at number eight on their list of 10 albums to revisit in 2020—calling it "one of the best R&B LPs of the '10s."

== Track listing ==
Album credits adapted from Tidal.

BEcoming track listing
No.	Title	Writer(s)	Producer(s)	Length
1.	"My Suicide Note (Intro)"	Stacy Barthe; Chauncey Hollis; James Ryan Ho	Hit-Boy; Malay^{[a]}	2:28
2.	"In My Head"	Barthe; Oren Kleinman	Oren Yoel	3:00
3.	"Sleep to Dream"	Barthe; Ho; Josiah Bashta	Malay	3:43
4.	"Eyes Wide Shut"	Barthe^{[b]}; Ho	Malay	3:33
5.	"Here I Am"	Barthe; Ho; Corey Gibson; Jesse Woodard; John Stephens; Joi Campbell	Malay	4:00
6.	"Me Versus Me"	Barthe; Darhyl Camper Jr.; Claude Kelly	DJ Camper	4:18
7.	"Find It (Transition)"	Barthe; Ran Pink	Ran Pink	4:33
8.	"Live For Today" (feat. Common)	Barthe; Benedetto Rotondi; Karla Elie; Lonnie Rashid Lynn	Ran Pink^{[c]}	3:46
9.	"Flawed Beautiful Creatures (Summer Version)"	Barthe; Camper Jr.	DJ Camper	3:12
10.	"Hey You There"	Barthe; Ho; Edward Blackmon; Ronnie Tucker; Shane Abrahams	Malay	3:22
11.	"Walk On Water"	Barthe; Ho	Malay	2:35
12.	"Born to Belong (Interlude)"	Barthe; Ho	Malay	3:03
13.	"War IV Love (Spring Version)"	Barthe; Ho	Malay	3:42
14.	"Angel" (feat. John Legend)	Patrick Moten^{[d]}; Sandra Sully^{[d]}	Dirty Harry; James Poyser	3:05
15.	"You Wonder Why?"	Barthe; Rotondi; Blackmon; Abrahams	Benny Cassette	3:50
16.	"In the Meantime"	Barthe; Pink	Ran Pink	4:21
17.	"Enough Is Enough..."	Barthe; Darnell Brock; Frankie Page Jr.; Sharone Scott; Timothy Prater	The ClassMatez	6:28
Total length:				62:59

Notes

- ^{^[a]} signifies a co-producer

Sample credits

- ^{^[b]} "Here I Am" contains samples of "Drink My Pain Away", as written by Stacy Barthe, Jesse Woodard IV, Joi Nicole Campbell & Corey Gibson.
- ^{^[c]} "Live For Today" contains an interpolation of "Mas que Nada", as written and performed by Jorge Ben.
- ^{^[d]} "Angel" is a cover of "Angel", as written by Anita Baker, Patrick Moten & Sandra Sully; and contains a drum beat from "Make the Music with Your Mouth, Biz", as performed by Biz Markie.

== Personnel ==
Personnel credits adapted from the liner notes of BEcoming.

=== Studios ===
Recording locations

- The Studio (Los Angeles, CA)
- The Boom Boom Room (Burbank, CA)
- Yoelian's Chambers (Los Angeles, CA)
- KMA Studios (New York, NY)
- Fonogenic Studios (Van Nuys, CA)
- The Pentagon (Silver Lake, CA)

- 4220 Studios (Los Angeles, CA)
- Capitol Studios (Hollywood, CA)
- Homeschool Studios (Los Angeles, CA)
- Germano Studios (New York, NY)
- Glenwood Studios (Burbank, CA)
- Studio for the Talented and Gifted (Los Angeles, CA)

Mixing & mastering locations

- Larrabee Sound Studios (North Hollywood, CA)
- Jinju Sounds (Hoboken, NJ)

- Sterling Sound (New York, NY)

=== Vocals ===
- Stacy Barthe – main artist
- Common – featured artist (track 8)
- John Legend – featured artist (track 14)

- Iris Belson – backing vocals (track 3)
- Joseph Walker – backing vocals (track 3)
- Ro James – backing vocals (track 13)

=== Musicians ===
- Malay – guitar (tracks 3–5, 10–13), bass (tracks 3–5, 10–13), keyboards (tracks 3–5, 10–13)
- Joseph Walker – guitar (track 3)
- Tykie Irby – guitar (track 17), bass (track 17)
- Matt Chamberlain – drums (tracks 1, 3, 12, 13)
- Charles LA Harper – percussion (tracks 3, 5, 15)
- Chris Arceneaux – percussion (tracks 3, 5, 15)

- Fall of Ai Chamber Orchestra – strings (tracks 1, 4)
- Geoff Gallegos – saxophone (tracks 3, 8)
- Shaunte Palmer – trombone (tracks 3, 8)
- Jamelle Williams - trumpet (tracks 3, 8)
- Darhyl Camper Jr. – piano (track 6)
- Jeff Babko – piano (track 6)

=== Production ===
- Stacy Barthe – executive production
- John Legend – executive production
- Malay – executive production, production (tracks 1, 3–5, 10–13), co-production (track 1)
- Eddie Blackmon – executive production
- Hit-Boy – production (track 1)
- Oren Yoel – production (track 2)

- DJ Camper – production (tracks 6, 9)
- Ran Pink – production (tracks 7, 8, 16)
- Dirty Harry – production (track 14)
- James Poyser – production (track 14)
- Benny Cassette – production (track 15)
- The ClassMatez – production (track 17)

=== Technical ===
- Malay – recording engineer (tracks 1, 3–5, 10–13), programming (tracks 1, 4, 5, 10–12)
- Oren Kleinman – recording engineer (track 2)
- Michael Piazza – recording engineer (track 6)
- Ran Pink – recording engineer (tracks 7, 16)
- Benny Cassette – recording engineer (tracks 8, 15)
- Michael Thomas – recording engineer (track 8)
- Joe Napolitano – recording engineer (track 9)
- James Caruana – recording engineer (track 14)

- Jacob Dennis – additional engineering (track 14)
- Jason Agel – mixing (track 9), recording engineer (track 14)
- Manny Marroquin – mixing (tracks 1–8, 10–17)
- Chris Galland – mix assistant (tracks 1–8, 10–17)
- Ike Schultz – mix assistant (tracks 1–8, 10–12, 14–17)
- Delbert Bowers – mix assistant (track 13)
- Chris Gehringer – mastering
- Dave Kutch – mastering

=== Management ===
- Eddie Blackmon – a&r, management
- Rex Rideout – a&r
- Elizabeth Isik – a&r admin
- Terese Joseph – a&r admin

- A Shade of Red Entertainment – management
- Lynn M. Scott – marketing coordinator
- Wealth Management Associates – business management
- Myman Greenspan Fineman/Fox Rosenberg & Light LLP – legal

=== Design ===
- Joe R. Perez – creative direction & design
- Jenna Marsh – art direction

- Geo Owen – assistant graphic design
- Pavel Paratov – animation

== Charts ==
Chart performance for BEcoming
Chart (2015)	Peak position
US Billboard 200	92
US Top Current Albums (Billboard)	36
US Top R&B Albums (Billboard)	4
US Top R&B/Hip-Hop Albums (Billboard)	8

== Release history ==
Region	Date	Format(s)	Label	Catalog #	Ref.
Worldwide	July 10, 2015	digital download • streaming	Motown • Homeschool • Universal	B0021473-02	
Worldwide	July 10, 2015	CD	Motown	B0021473-02	
