= Inspired (song) =

Promotional single by Miley Cyrus

from the album Younger Now
- Released: June 9, 2017
- Studio: House of Blues Studios (Nashville)
- Genre: Country
- Length: 3:21
- Label: RCA
- Songwriters: Miley Cyrus; Oren Yoel
- Producers: Oren Yoel; Miley Cyrus

Miley Cyrus promotional singles chronology
"Hands of Love" (2015)	"Inspired" (2017)	"Week Without You" (2017)

"Inspired" is a song recorded by American singer Miley Cyrus. It was released on June 9, 2017, as a promotional single from her sixth studio album Younger Now (2017). Written and produced by Cyrus and Oren Yoel, "Inspired" is a country ballad about creating a difference in the world. Hillary Clinton's 2016 presidential campaign inspired Cyrus to write the track, which references her father Billy Ray and her childhood in Tennessee. Media suggested that this song was as an example of Cyrus' career change following the more hip hop approach to her fourth studio album Bangerz.

"Inspired" was first made available for music download and streaming during Pride Month. Cyrus donated her personal profits from the song to her Happy Hippie Foundation, which deals with homelessness among LGBTQ youth. Her fans created a lyric video, which she shared on her Instagram account. Critics had a mixed response to the song. "Inspired" charted in Australia, Commonwealth of Independent States, and Spain. Cyrus promoted the track with live performances, including at the One Love Manchester benefit concert.

== Background and recording ==
Miley Cyrus wrote and produced "Inspired" with Oren Yoel for her sixth studio album Younger Now (2017). The pair have writing and production credits on all of the album's tracks. Paul David Hager recorded "Inspired" at the House of Blues Studios in Nashville, Tennessee, and mixed it with assistance from Mark Ralston. Doran Dina was the audio engineer and Dave Kutch mastered the final version. Backing musicians included: Nicole Row, bass guitar; Matt Walker, cello; Antoine Silverman, fiddle; Jaco Caraco and James Arentzen, guitar; and Paul Franklin, pedal steel guitar. As well as playing drums, Stacy Jones was the song's music director.

Cyrus based the lyrics on Hillary Clinton's 2016 presidential campaign. A week prior to campaigning for Clinton, Cyrus was caught in the middle of a funeral procession and was surrounded by mourners. The situation caused her to reflect on her family and environmental issues, leading her to develop the concept for the song. The day after the 2016 United States presidential election, Cyrus sent the song to Clinton, who responded with a letter.

== Music and lyrics ==
"Inspired" is a country ballad lasting three minutes and 21 seconds. Composed in the key of G major, the song uses common time and a tempo of 104 beats per minute. The instrumental focuses on string instruments, and Entertainment Weekly's Eric King described the sound as "backroad [and] fiddle-prone." The Ringer's Lindsay Zoladz identified the song as acoustic and downtempo. Music journalist John Norris wrote that the final version had a richer production than the more sparse demo he had heard while visiting Cyrus in April 2017. Cyrus' vocal range, described as raspy by Billboard's Zachariah Porter, is between the low note of G_{3} and the high note of C_{5}. Music critics referred to "Inspired" as the singer's return to country music, following Cyrus' foray into hip hop music for her fourth studio album, Bangerz. Media outlets wrote that Cyrus adopted a flower child persona for the song.

In an interview on The Zach Sang Show, Cyrus said "Inspired" was a "new, older version" of her 2009 single "The Climb". Throughout the song, she hopes the world will improve. "Inspired" begins with the lyrics "I'm writing down my dreams, all I'd like to see, starting with the bees, or else they're gonna die", which Bustle's Dana Getz interpreted as a commentary on climate change. The song transitions into Cyrus' memories of her father Billy Ray Cyrus and her childhood in Tennessee. She sings about running barefoot, spending time with her dad in a creek, and getting words of encouragement from him.

Cyrus said she was inspired by the stories Clinton told of her father, Hugh Rodham, during the 2016 United States presidential debates. Norris interpreted the chorus "we are meant for more, with a handle on the door, that opens up for change" as intended to celebrate the victory of Clinton in the 2016 election. On the other hand, Getz attributed the chorus as Cyrus reaching out to her fans. The final verse, with the lyrics "death is life, it's not a curse, reminds us of time and what it's worth", is about fear and the future. The song ends with the lyric "is anyone watching us down here" which Anna Gaca of Spin likened to an appeal to God. E! News' Zach Johnson wrote that "Inspired" also addresses mental health.

== Release and promotion ==
RCA released "Inspired" as a promotional single from Younger Now. It was the second song from the album, following the release of its lead single "Malibu". "Inspired" was made available on June 9, 2017, via music download and streaming. Cyrus donated her personal profits from the song to her Happy Hippie Foundation, which focuses on homelessness among LGBTQ youth. The single's cover photograph was taken by her fiancé, Liam Hemsworth, who also did the artwork for "Malibu". Cyrus released the song during Pride Month in response to what she called a "desperate cry for more love in this world." On July 1, she shared a fan-made lyric video through her Instagram account. In the video, the singer's fans hold handwritten lyrics while lip syncing to the track; Cyrus said she "shed a few tears" on seeing it.

Cyrus promoted the track with live performances. She first performed "Inspired" on May 26, 2017, during an episode of Today. She also sang it as part of the One Love Manchester concert where she dedicated it to Manchester. Her performance received positive reviews from media outlets. On June 11, she sang it during the Washington, D.C. pride festival, where she was the headliner for the event. On June 16, she performed "Inspired" and "Malibu" as the closing for an episode of The Tonight Show Starring Jimmy Fallon. She also sang it for the iHeartSummer '17 concert, sponsored by iHeartMedia, and dedicated the performance to the LGBT community.

Commercially, "Inspired" reached number 152 on the French SNEP singles chart for one week. It debuted and peaked at number 97 on the Australian ARIA chart. The single reached number 450 on the Tophit chart in Commonwealth of Independent States. According to Cantor, "Inspired" performed poorly during its first day on Spotify and the iTunes Store.

== Critical reception ==
"Inspired" received positive reviews. Getz said the simplicity of the lyrics was appropriate for the divisive political climate in the United States. Porter described "Inspired" as a gay anthem and enjoyed its focus on LGBT equality and self-confidence. Teen Vogue's Suzannah Weiss summed up the single as being an "uplifting message [that] is much-needed right now." Cillea Houghton of Taste Of Country praised "Inspired" as Miley's dedication to her dad, and Norris called it one of the best Father's Day presents. Alex Young of Consequence of Sound likened the single to music recorded by Loretta Lynn and Emmylou Harris. McDermott praised Cyrus' vocals for her "soaring harmonies" and "blissful croon", and Brian Cantor of Headline Planet wrote that she balanced her emotional performance with restraint. NME's Leonie Cooper praised the instrumental was "delicate [and] fiddle-laced."

Other critics had a more negative response. Tom Breihan of Stereogum cited the single as an example of how Cyrus' career change was "absolutely forced and cynical", and McDermott questioned the effectiveness of the lyrics, which he compared to a word salad. Gaca criticized "Inspired" as lacking the intensity of "The Climb" and referred to Halsey's duet with Lauren Jauregui on "Strangers" as a superior LGBT anthem. Along with the album tracks "I Would Die For You" and "Miss You So Much", Noisey's Richard S. Hei felt Cyrus was unsuccessful in her attempt to emotionally bond with the listener. Gaca questioned Cyrus' decision to record a tribute to her father when he had said that his daughter's Hannah Montana fame ruined their family.

== Personnel ==
Credits adapted from the liner notes of Younger Now:

Recording location

- House of Blues Studios (Nashville)

Credits

- Bass – Nicole Row
- Cello – Matt Walker
- Drums, music director, producer – Stacy Jones
- Fiddle – Antoine Silverman
- Guitar – Jaco Caraco, James Arentzen
- Mixed By [Assistant], Recorded By [Assistant] – Mark Ralston
- Mixed By, Recorded By – Paul David Hager
- Pedal Steel Guitar – Paul Franklin
- Producer – Oren Yoel, Miley Cyrus
- Written By – Miley Cyrus, Oren Yoel
- Mastered By – Dave Kutch
- Engineer – Doron Dina

== Charts ==
Chart (2017)	Peak position
Australia (ARIA)	97
France (SNEP)	152

== Release history ==
Region	Date	Format(s)	Label(s)	Ref.
Various	June 9, 2017	Music download; streaming	RCA	
