= Stacy Barthe =

American singer and songwriter (born 1985)

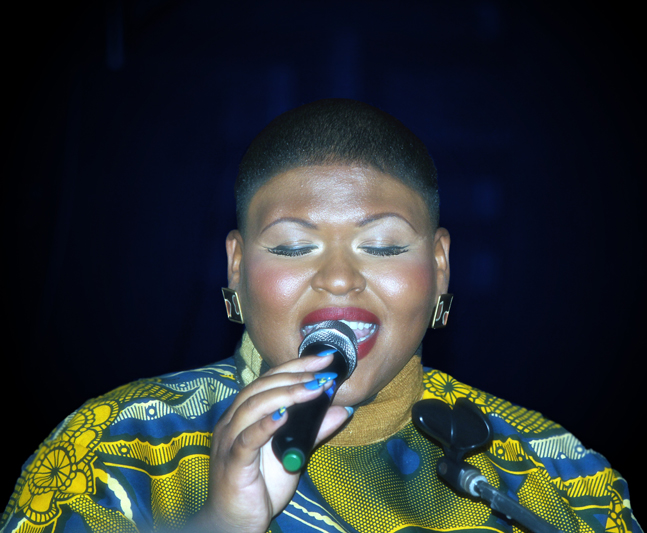
- Barthe performing at the Infusion Lounge in 2011

Background information
- Also known as: St. Barthe
- Born: July 19, 1985 (age 41); New York City, U.S.
- Genres: R&B; pop; soul
- Occupations: Songwriter; singer
- Years active: 2007–present
- Labels: Motown; Homeschool
- Website: iamstacybarthe.com

Stacy Barthe (born July 19, 1985) is an American singer and songwriter. Born and raised in Brooklyn, she began her musical career as an intern for Geffen and Jive Records' urban divisions from 2003 to 2005. She met producer Hit-Boy in 2006, and signed with Universal Music Publishing Group the following year to pursue songwriting work for other artists. As a recording artist, She signed with John Legend's Homeschool Records and Motown to release her debut studio album Becoming (2015), which entered the Billboard 200 and was met with positive critical reception.

As a songwriter, Barthe has been credited on songs for artists including Beyoncé, Kelly Rowland, Heidi Montag, Britney Spears, Katy Perry, Brandy, Miley Cyrus, Alicia Keys, Nipsey Hussle, Tiwa Savage, and Rihanna. The latter's 2011 single, "Cheers (Drink to That)", co-written by Barthe, peaked at number seven on the Billboard Hot 100. Barthe has worked with producers including Malay, Cool & Dre, The Runners, Jerry Duplessis, Supa Dups, Danja, Dapo Torimiro, and Tricky Stewart. She has received eight Grammy Award nominations, for her contributions to Katy Perry's Teenage Dream, Rihanna's Loud, Miley Cyrus' Bangerz, Nipsey Hussle's Victory Lap, and Beyoncé's The Lion King: The Gift.

Barthe made her feature film debut as Black Madonna in the 2021 romantic drama Venus as a Boy, directed by Ty Hodges.

== Career ==
In December 2010, Barthe released her debut extended play (EP), Sincerely Yours, Stacy Barthe. In November 2011, "Silent Night" by Brandy Norwood, which featured Barthe, was leaked online.

On March 12, 2015, French future house producer Tchami released the song "After Life" which featured Barthe's vocals. The song received over 8 million plays on SoundCloud as of April 2016. In July 2015, Barthe's debut studio album BEcoming reached number 92 on the Billboard 200.

== Discography ==
=== Extended plays ===
List of extended plays, with release details
Title	EP Details
Sincerely Yours, Stacy Barthe	Released: August 29, 2011; Formats: digital download
The Seven Days of Christmas	Released: December 5, 2011; Formats: digital download
In the InBetween	Released: February 7, 2012; Label: Homeschool / Stellar Music Ink'd; Formats: digital download
P.S. I Love You	Released: January 1, 2013; Label: Motown / Homeschool; Formats: digital download, streaming
FKA Stacy Barthe	Released: May 27, 2016; Label: format records; Formats: digital download, streaming

=== Studio albums ===
List of studio albums, with release details
Title	Album details
Becoming	Released: July 10, 2015; Label: Motown / Homeschool; Formats: CD, digital download, streaming

=== Singles ===
==== As lead artist ====
List of singles as lead artist, with release year and project name
Title	Year	Album	Ref
"No Strings Attached" (featuring John Legend)	2012	In the InBetween	
"Keep It Like It Is"	2012	In the InBetween	
"Home in My Heart"	2013	P.S. I Love You	
"Hell Yeah!" (featuring Rick Ross)	2013	P.S. I Love You	
"Extraordinary Love (Fall Version)"	2014	non-album single	
"War IV Love"	2014	Becoming	
"Flawed Beautiful Creatures"	2014	Becoming	
"Angel" (featuring John Legend)	2014	Becoming	
"Live For Today" (featuring Common)	2015	Becoming	
"You Wonder Why?"	2015	Becoming	
"Virgin"	2016	FKA Stacy Barthe	
"One More Time" (with The Chemistri)	2018	non-album singles	
"Shoot"	2020	non-album singles	
"Heaven on Earth" (with DJ Ruckus)	2020	non-album singles	
"Sugar Cane" (with June Freedom)	2020	Anchor Baby	

==== As featured artist ====
List of singles as featured artist, with release year and project name
Title	Year	Album / EP	Ref
"SoBelieve" (Theron "Neff-U" Feemster featuring Stacy Barthe)	2009	non-album single	
"Looking You Up" (Mateo featuring Stacy Barthe)	2012	Suite 823	
"Everything Was the Same" (Fabolous featuring Stacy Barthe)	2013	The S.O.U.L. Tape 3	
"Live for You" (Bonez tha Truth featuring Stacy Barthe)	2015	non-album singles	
"Born To Love" (Softy featuring Stacy Barthe)	2015	non-album singles	
"After Life" (Tchami featuring Stacy Barthe)	2015	After Life	
"I Wanna Know" (Joe Budden featuring Stacy Barthe)	2016	Rage & The Machine	
"What It Feel Like" (Marcus Black featuring Stacy Barthe)	2017	non-album single	
"All We Need Is Love" (Lil Debbie featuring Stacy Barthe)	2017	OG in My System	
"Black Woman" (Nick Grant featuring Stacy Barthe)	2018	Dreamin' Out Loud	
"Good on You" (Dorion featuring Stacy Barthe)	2018	non-album singles	
"Do Over" (Replay featuring Stacy Barthe)	2019	non-album singles	
"Oh My God (Skoof Remix)" (Jimmy Cozier featuring Stacy Barthe)	2019	non-album singles	
"Love Her (Remix)" (Jimmy Cozier featuring Runtown and Stacy Barthe)	2019	non-album singles	
"Mercy (Remix)" (Anh Jesslyn featuring Stacy Barthe)	2019	non-album singles	
"Last Man Standing" (DJ Ruckus featuring Stacy Barthe)	2019	non-album singles	
"Immortal" (Capozzi featuring Stacy Barthe)	2020	non-album singles	
"Rebirth" (Tchami featuring Stacy Barthe)	2020	Year Zero	

==== Promotional singles ====
List of promotional singles, with release year and project name
Title	Year	Album / EP	Ref
"Sober"	2018	non-album single	

=== Guest appearances ===
List of non-single guest appearances, with release year, project name and other performing artist(s)
Title	Year	Album / EP	Other Artist(s)	Ref
"Paper"	2011	Gumbeaux	Chase N. Cashe	
"Running In Place"	2012	HITstory	Hit-Boy	
"Angel (Interlude)"	2013	Love in the Future	John Legend	
"Astronaut Pussy / Welcome to California"	2013	OKE: Operation Kill Everything	The Game, ScHoolboy Q, Skeme, Too $hort	
"Still I Rise"	2014	The Art of Chill	Nitty Scott	
"The Purge"	2014	Blood Moon: Year of the Wolf	The Game	
"Last Time You Seen"	2015	The Documentary 2.5	The Game, Scarface	
"Not Ready To Go"	2015	Welcome To Gilladelphia	Gillie Da Kid	
"Stay Up"	2016	The Definition Of...	Fantasia	
"Mercy"	2016	Slauson Boy 2	Nipsey Hussle	
"Do Better"	2017	Party & Pain	Maino	
"Victory Lap"	2018	Victory Lap	Nipsey Hussle	
"Happifeelins'"	2019	5: The mAlbum	KING LEO BAKARi, TC Carson	
"Further"	2019	Audio Mars	Audio Push, MyGuyMars	
"Supernatural"	2019	Wah Gwaan?!	Shaggy, Shenseea	
"The Quarantine"	2020	Covid 1na (The Cure)	Amillion The Poet, J'ne Indigo	
"Livin What I Know"	2020	Occupational Hazard	Mozzy, Tsu Surf	

== Tours ==
=== Headlining ===
- Bessie's 81 Theatre Tour (2015) (event series by HBO)

=== Opening act ===
- The "All of Me" Tour (2012) (supporting Estelle)

== Awards and nominations ==
=== Grammy Awards ===
Year	Work	Category	Result	Ref
2011	Teenage Dream "Hummingbird Heartbeat"	Album of the Year	Nominated	
2011	Teenage Dream "Hummingbird Heartbeat"	Best Pop Vocal Album	Nominated	
2012	Loud "Cheers (Drink to That)"	Album of the Year	Nominated	
2012	Loud "Cheers (Drink to That)"	Best Pop Vocal Album	Nominated	
2015	Bangerz "Adore You"	Best Pop Vocal Album	Nominated	
2019	Victory Lap "Victory Lap"	Best Rap Album	Nominated	
2020	The Lion King: The Gift "BIGGER" and "BROWN SKIN GIRL"	Best Pop Vocal Album	Nominated	
2021	"Collide"	Best R&B Song	Nominated	

=== Soul Train Music Awards ===
Year	Work	Category	Result	Ref
2013	Stacy Barthe	Centric Certified Award	Nominated	
2019	"BROWN SKIN GIRL"	The Ashford & Simpson; Songwriter's Award	Won	

=== Black Reel Awards ===
Year	Work	Category	Result	Ref
2020	"Collide"	Outstanding Original Song	Won	

== Songwriting credits ==
Indicates a single release
Indicates a promotional single release

Title	Year	Artist(s)	Album / EP	Co-writers	Ref
"Blur"	2008	Britney Spears	Circus	Nathaniel Hills • Marcella Araica	
"Heaven" (featuring will.i.am)	2009	Cheryl Cole	3 Words	William Adams • Cheryl Cole	
"Everywhere You Go" (featuring Rhythm of Africa United)	2010	Kelly Rowland	2010 FIFA World Cup; MTN Theme Song	N/A	
"Face the Light"	2010	Girlicious	Rebuilt	Corey Chorus	
"Cheers (Drink to That)"	2010	Rihanna	Loud	Andrew Harr • Jermaine Jackson • Laura Pergolizzi • Corey Gibson • Chris Ivery • Avril Lavigne • Robyn Fenty • Lauren Christy • Graham Edwards • Scott Spock	
"I'll Do It"	2010	Heidi Montag	Superficial	Steve Morales • Keithin Pittman	
"Hummingbird Heartbeat"	2010	Katy Perry	Teenage Dream	Katy Perry • Christopher Stewart • Monte Neuble	
"I Don't Care"	2011	Brandy	A Family Business	Corey Gibson • Clinton Sparks • Brandy Norwood • Grigancine	
"Sorry" (featuring André 3000)	2012	T.I.	Trouble Man: Heavy Is the Head	Clifford Harris, Jr. • André Benjamin • Phalon Alexander • Derel "Sir Clef" Haynes • Aldric "Po" Johns	
"When It's All Over"	2012	Alicia Keys	Girl on Fire	Alicia Keys • John Stephens	
"Limitedless"	2012	Alicia Keys	Girl on Fire	Alicia Keys • Andrew "Pop" Wansel • Warren "Oak" Felder • Sevyn Streeter	
"Like I Love You"	2012	Melanie Fiona	The MF Life	Melanie Hallim • Luke James Boyd • Jason Gilbert • Dwayne Chin-Quee • Mitchum Chin	
"Speak Ya Mind"	2012	Estelle	All of Me	Estelle Swaray • George Clinton • Bootsy Collins • Corey Gibson	
"Adore You"	2013	Miley Cyrus	Bangerz	Oren Yoel	
"So Good"	2014	Marsha Ambrosius	Friends & Lovers	Marsha Ambrosius • Marcos Palacios • Ernest Clark • Kevin Randolph • Tony Russell	
"La La La La La"	2014	Marsha Ambrosius	Friends & Lovers	Marsha Ambrosius • Eric Hudson • Minnie Riperton • Andrew "Hit Drew" Clifton • Richard Rudolph	
"Outta My League"	2014	Teyana Taylor	VII	Teyana Taylor • Uforo Ebong • Christopher Umana • Eric Bellinger • Jaramye "JRM" Daniels • Akil "Fresh" King • Kyle "KO" Owens	
"Just A Man" (featuring Stephen Marley)	2015	Akon	Stadium	Aliaune Thiam	
"Bad Timing"	2016	Ro James	ELDORADO	Ronnie Tucker • Mamaou "Dula" Adula • Nesbitt Wesonga Jr. • Mario Lionel Loving	
"I'm Sorry (Interlude)"	2016	Ro James	ELDORADO	Ronnie Tucker • Antonio Golson • Maurice Ryan Toby • Nathaniel Flowers • Clarence Hutchinson • Leo Breckenridge	
"Glory Days" (featuring Hayley Kiyoko)	2017	Sweater Beats	For the Cold	Antonio Cuna • James Roston • Uzoechi Emenike • Rachel Keen	
"Bigger"	2019	Beyoncé	The Lion King: The Gift	Beyoncé Knowles-Carter • Derek Dixie • Rachel Keen • Akil King • Ricky Lawson	
"Brown Skin Girl" (feat. Blue Ivy Carter)	2019	Beyoncé	The Lion King: The Gift	Beyoncé Knowles-Carter • Carlos St. John • Adio Marchant • Shawn Carter • Anathi Mnyango • Ayodeji Balogun • Michael Uzowuru • Richard Isong	
"Collide" (featuring EarthGang)	2019	Tiana Major9	Queen & Slim: The Soundtrack	Akil King • Benny Cassette • Josh Lopez • Kaveh Rastegar • Olu Fann • Sam Barsh • Sonyae Elise	
"Us (Interlude)"	2020	Tiwa Savage	Celia	Tiwatope Savage • Muhammad Basit Animashaun • Phillip Kayode Moses	
"FWMM (F*ck with My Mind)"	2020	Tiwa Savage	Celia	Tiwatope Savage • Muhammad Basit Animashaun • Michael Hunter • Segun Michael Ajayi • Princewill Emmanuel	
"Glory"	2020	Tiwa Savage	Celia	Tiwatope Savage • Akil "Fresh" King • Maurice Simmonds • Nana Afriyie • Shama Joseph • Kheil Harrison • Jerry "Juice" Alexidor • Segun Michael Ajayi	
"Celia's Song"	2020	Tiwa Savage	Celia	Tiwatope Savage • Muhammad Basit Animashaun • Phillip Kayode Moses • Emmanuel Aladeloba	
