= Cathedral (Currensy album) =

Mixtape by Curren$y & Chase N. Cashe
- Released: August 5, 2015
- Recorded: 2015
- Genre: Hip hop
- Length: 25:34
- Label: Jet Life Recordings
- Producer: Chase N. Cashe

Curren$y chronology
Even More Saturday Night Car Tunes (2015)	Cathedral (2015)	Canal Street Confidential (2015)

Cathedral is a mixtape by American rapper Curren$y and producer Chase N. Cashe. It was released for online download on August 5, 2015.

== Track listing ==
- All tracks are produced by Chase N. Cashe.

No.	Title	Length
1.	"Intro"	1:53
2.	"In the Night" (featuring Raheem DeVaughn)	2:44
3.	"All Over"	3:21
4.	"Gold"	3:25
5.	"Like Five Duece Four Trey"	4:32
6.	"2 Us It's Nothing"	2:56
7.	"Plug"	3:32
8.	"T.Y." (featuring T.Y.) (Bonus)	3:12
Total length:		25:34
