= Happy Hippie Foundation =

Nonprofit organization founded by Miley Cyrus

- Founded: September 17, 2014; 12 years ago
- Founder: Miley Cyrus
- Type: NGO
- Location: Santa Monica, California, U.S.
- Key people: Stephanie Green, Principal Officer
- Website: happyhippies.org

The Happy Hippie Foundation is an American non-profit organization founded by American singer and entertainer Miley Cyrus on September 17, 2014, and officially launched to the public on May 5, 2015. The foundation focuses on youth homelessness (particularly among LGBTQ youth), the LGBTQ community, and other vulnerable populations.

== Background ==
By 2012, Miley Cyrus had a history of using her fame as a platform for philanthropy, including significant donations to charitable organizations, charity singles, performances at benefit concerts and the donation of personal items to auctions.

At the 2014 MTV Video Music Awards (in August 2014), Miley Cyrus's award for Video of the Year ("Wrecking Ball") was accepted by a young man named Jesse Helt in honor of "the 1.6 million runaways and homeless youth in the United States who are starving, lost and scared for their lives right now." Helt directed viewers to get involved by visiting Cyrus's Facebook page and donating to My Friend's Place, an organization helping homeless youth in the Los Angeles area; they raised more than $200,000 in twenty-four hours. Cyrus took inspiration from the 45th Academy Awards in 1973, at which Marlon Brando sent Sacheen Littlefeather to decline his Best Actor award.

Cyrus began planning and developing her organization over the summer of 2014, after getting involved with My Friend's Place, and registered the website on September 17. Cyrus drove even harder to launch her non-profit to the public after the death of Leelah Alcorn in late December. Alcorn was a male-to-female transgender teenager whose suicide attracted international attention. Cyrus stated, "That's what I wanted to do. That's what made me happy. And that's what Happy Hippie is about: doing what you do, being happy, and not hurting anyone. It gave me meaning in everything." Cyrus was also a spokesperson for the MAC AIDS Fund in 2015, to help transgender people living with HIV in L.A. and San Francisco find medical care and housing.

In 2024 Cyrus announced that the foundation would be renamed as Miley Cyrus Foundation.

== Activities ==
Mission statement

The Happy Hippie Foundation rallies young people to fight injustice and provides homeless youth, LGBTQ youth, and other vulnerable populations with support services, direct needs services, and prevention services. The Happy Hippie Foundation also engages young people through public education, fundraising, and awareness campaigns.

— GuideStar

By 2016, Happy Hippie and My Friend's Place had donated "40,000 meals, 20,000 snacks, and 40,000 pairs of underwear and socks" to homeless children. Happy Hippie "treats at-risk kids with art and animal therapies".

In an effort to provide a safe, moderated, and interactive space to discuss gender, Happy Hippie and Gender Spectrum hosted a digital "Meet-Up". As a result of donations received, Gender Spectrum was able to begin hosting weekly digital support groups, serving "over 1,300 transgender and gender-expansive youth and their families".

Happy Hippie often aims to provide immediate relief in the wake of emergencies or tragedies. For instance, the foundation partnered with the Zebra Coalition, a network of organizations providing support for LGBTQ youth in Central Florida, to offer immediate counseling following the 2016 Orlando nightclub shooting. In the aftermath of the 2016 Great Smoky Mountains wildfires, the Happy Hippie Foundation contributed to the Dollywood Foundation's My People Fund to help those affected in the Gatlinburg, Tennessee area. The Dollywood Foundation was founded by Cyrus's godmother, country music icon Dolly Parton.

In June 2017, Cyrus performed at Capital Pride in Washington, D.C., wearing the Happy Hippie Foundation's logo on a white t-shirt. She released the song "Inspired" in honor of LGBT Pride Month, with her portion of any proceeds going directly to the Happy Hippie Foundation. Cyrus also created a collection of 22 pride-themed sneakers and 11 t-shirts for shoe company Converse and their 2017 pride collection. All net proceeds from the 2017 Converse Pride Collection were donated to the It Gets Better Project and the Happy Hippie Foundation. The 2018 Converse pride collection was designed by Cyrus with the Happy Hippie logo being featured on the line and the net proceeds going to the foundation along with other pride-related charities. The design theme, motto and hashtag was "Yes to all."

=== Social media campaigns ===
Cyrus met with Instagram in 2015 to offer the photo-sharing platform feedback on their product, discussing potential features like allowing users to designate "word sensitivities" that would ban certain words from appearing on their feeds. The Happy Hippie Foundation and Instagram collaborated on a social justice campaign called Happy Hippie Presents #InstaPride, a gender identity-focused portrait series that launched on June 15, 2015. The portraits, which lived on Instagram, aimed to increase awareness and acceptance of people outside of the gender binary. "The portraits and the people in them are meant to serve as positive examples for young people who might be struggling to figure themselves out, as well as reference points for those who might not personally know anyone who doesn't feel at home in their own body," Cyrus told Time. Notable participants included YouTube personalities Gigi Gorgeous and Brendan Jordan.

In September 2016, Happy Hippie teamed up with the band Phantogram and The Trevor Project to support LGBTQ youth and raise suicide prevention awareness across Instagram, Facebook and Twitter; the campaign coincided with Suicide Prevention Month. The foundation, Cyrus and Phantogram shared mental health facts, suicide prevention resources and crisis intervention hotline information. Following the result of the 2016 U.S. presidential election, in which Donald Trump was elected the 45th President of the United States, Cyrus launched a new campaign called #HopefulHippies that "encourage[d] people to take action in their communities." In an Instagram post announcing the #HopefulHippies campaign, Cyrus announced that Happy Hippie would begin supporting public school classroom projects with DonorsChoose. Cyrus stated that the focus on education was "in honor of Clinton". The #HopefulHippies campaign was able to raise over $11,000, helping over 10,000 students across 60 schools between November 10, 2016, and February 13, 2017.

=== The Backyard Sessions ===
In 2012, Cyrus released a series of videos called the Backyard Sessions, in which she performed covers of her favorite songs in her own backyard. In 2015, she released a new set of Backyard Sessions videos to publicize the launch of the Happy Hippie Foundation, beginning on May 6 when she performed "Different" with Joan Jett. The sessions were a collaboration with Facebook, and allowed for donations to be made to the foundation through the site. Cyrus also collaborated with singer Ariana Grande to perform the Crowded House cover of "Don't Dream It's Over". The video became the most popular from the sessions, and the duo also performed it in honor of Ariana Grande's One Love Manchester, a benefit concert for the attacks at the singers' concert in Manchester, England. Some of the songs in the sessions reflected the foundation's themes: Cyrus's cover of Dido's "No Freedom" was dedicated to Leelah Alcorn, and she performed "Androgynous" and "True Trans Soul Rebel" with Laura Jane Grace, who came out as transgender in 2012.
