= Troy Ave =

American rapper (born 1985)

- Born: Roland Collins; November 23, 1985 (age 40); Brooklyn, New York, U.S.
- Genre: East Coast hip-hop
- Occupation: Rapper
- Years active: 2006–present
- Labels: BSB; EMPIRE
- Website: www.troyave.com

Roland Collins (born November 23, 1985), better known by his stage name Troy Ave, is an American rapper. Hailing from New York City's Crown Heights neighborhood, his moniker is adapted from a street near his childhood home. His two studio albums, New York City: The Album (2013) and Major Without a Deal (2015), were both self-released and entered the Billboard Top R&B/Hip-Hop Albums chart; the latter entered the Billboard 200. He was named in XXL magazine's 2014 Freshmen Class.

== Career ==
Collins began his rap career in early 2006 with his singles "Rep It Wit My Heart" and "BK BK" airing on BET: Uncut and Rap City.

He announced that his new street album, Dope Boy Troy Vol. 2: NuPac was released in April 2017.

== Feud with Joey Badass ==
In June 2015, tensions began brewing between Troy Ave and a fellow Brooklyn-native rapper Joey Badass, when the latter declared himself the "#1 independent hip hop recording artist and a brand in the world" in a series of tweets, to which the former responded in another tweet by pointing out that he has been signed to Cinematic Music Group, whose music is distributed by RED Distribution, a subsidiary of Sony Music Entertainment. Joey Badass later refuted reports of a feud between him and Troy Ave in another tweet.

On July 7, 2015, in an interview with Ebro Darden on Hot 97, Joey Badass had words of praise for Troy Ave, stating: "At some point you gotta [sic] have some level of respect for Troy because, at the end of the day, we're both independent artists who are standing on major platforms next to a whole bunch of major artists and they know who we are." In February 2016, he reignited the feud in a single, titled "Ready", where he raps: "60k, first week for the badass / 200k to this day, I know you niggas mad / With that 80-20 split, my nigga do the math / my nigga Kirk just outsold Troy Ave" (in reference to Kirk Knight's debut studio album Late Knight Special and Troy Ave's second studio album Major Without a Deal). In response, Troy Ave released a diss track, titled "Badass" the following week, in which he not only insulted Joey Badass, but also targeted fellow Pro Era member Capital Steez, who committed suicide by jumping off a building in December 2012.

...Don't get suicidal like your friend, here's a casket / Steez burning in hell, my burner's in my belt / I'm really killing shit, you niggas killing yourself / Fucking weirdos, off the roof, "Steer clear, yo!" / This nigga's trying to fly, he think he a superhero / Splat man, fuck you and that man / and all three labels you signed to, they whack man...

— Troy Ave, on his song "Badass".

"Badass"
25-second sample of the diss track "Badass" by Troy Ave.

Following the release of "Badass", Troy Ave called in at Sway in the Morning on Shade 45, stating: "He didn't pass away; he killed himself. There's a difference. He took his own life. God gave you life, it ain't your right to take that. That's a fact. I got niggas in jail who got life sentences, they might as well be dead. They could've traded their life for his." He then received heavy criticism from fans and fellow artists alike, including Styles P, ASAP Ant and ASAP Twelvyy, who wrote, amongst a series of other tweets: "Wish I had a time machine to go back and give these niggas moms [sic] that abortion money."

On March 29, 2016, in a freestyle on Sway in the Morning, Joey Badass responded to "Badass" in a series of lines aimed at Troy Ave, though never referring to him directly. Among other lines, he rapped: "Now I won't even lie, can't agree with suicide / but in the darkest times, there's still a brighter side / He took a leap of faith and only brightened his light / You took a cheap shot at hate and only shortened your life." In an interview with HipHopDX the following day, Fat Joe stated that he personally reached out to both Joey Badass and Troy Ave to try and squash the feud, but failed.

== Legal issues ==
On May 26, 2016, Collins was arrested for attempted murder and illegal weapon possession for shooting at a T.I. concert. During the event at Irving Plaza, where T.I. and others were scheduled to perform, four people were shot, one fatally, by a shooter from the VIP section of the event. The man who died, Ronald McPhatter, 33, was said to be a friend of Collins, who was first taken to NYU Langone Medical Center and then transferred to nearby NYC Health + Hospitals/Bellevue where he was arrested as a primary suspect in the shooting. While at the hospital, it was alleged that the gunshot wound was self-inflicted.

Collins pleaded not guilty, claiming self-defense and that he and McPhatter were shot by an unnamed assailant. He was remanded without bail. His lawyer then urged the public to come forward with any information that witnesses could provide.

Collins dropped a single called "Chuck Norris (Hoes & Gangstas)" and a mixtape called Free Troy Ave, in reference to his condition of being charged with shootings. It was released on June 6, 2016. On July 11, 2016, he made bail and was temporarily released.

== Discography ==
=== Studio albums ===
List of studio albums, with selected chart positions and certifications
Title	Album details	Peak chart positions		
Title	Album details	US	US R&B	US Rap
New York City: The Album	Released: November 4, 2013 (US); Label: BSB Records; Formats: CD, download	—	47	—
Major Without a Deal	Released: June 5, 2015 (US); Label: BSB Records; Formats: download	109	14	13
"—" denotes a title that did not chart, or was not released in that territory.

=== Mixtapes ===
List of mixtapes, with year released
Title	Album details
I'm In Traffick	Released: August 17, 2009; Label: BSB Records; Format: Download
Bricks In My Backpack	Released: September 27, 2010; Label: BSB Records; Format: Download
KFC (Kilos For Cheap)	Released: December 24, 2010; Label: BSB Records; Format: Download
Bricks In My Backpack 2: Powder To The People	Released: August 30, 2011; Label: BSB Records; Format: Download
Bricks In My Backpack 3: The Harry Powder Trilogy	Released: June 12, 2012; Label: BSB Records; Format: Download
White Christmas	Released: December 25, 2012; Label: BSB Records; Format: Download
BSB Vol. 1	Released: March 4, 2013; Label: BSB Records; Format: Download
BSB Vol. 2	Released: May 15, 2013; Label: BSB Records; Format: Download
BSB Vol. 3	Released: July 4, 2013; Label: BSB Records; Format: Download
White Christmas 2	Released: December 24, 2013; Label: BSB Records; Format: Download
BSB Vol. 4	Released: May 7, 2014; Label: BSB Records; Format: Download
BSB Vol. 5	Released: August 18, 2014; Label: BSB Records; Format: Download
BSB Vol. 5: The Extras (EP)	Released: August 18, 2014; Label: BSB Records; Format: Download
Major Without A Deal (Reloaded)	Released: October 6, 2015; Label: BSB Records; Format: Download
White Christmas 3	Released: December 18, 2015; Label: BSB Records; Format: Download
Free Troy Ave	Released: June 6, 2016; Label: BSB Records; Format: Download
Roland Collins	Released: August 12, 2016; Label: BSB Records; Format: Download
White Christmas 4	Released: December 23, 2016; Label: BSB Records; Format: Download
Dope Boy Troy	Released: March 23, 2017; Label: BSB Records; Format: Download
Nupac	Released: April 17, 2017; Label: BSB Records; Format: Download
Style 4 Free	Released: June 17, 2017; Label: BSB Records; Format: Download
Album of The Summer	Released: August 25, 2017; Label: BSB Records; Format: Download
White Christmas 5	Released: December 25, 2017; Label: BSB Records; Format: Download
More Money More Problems	Released: November 16, 2018; Label: BSB Records; Format: Download
White Christmas 6	Released: December 24, 2018; Label: BSB Records; Format: Download
White Christmas 7	Released: December 13, 2019; Label: BSB Records; Format: Download
Troy Ave, Vol. 1	Released: May 15, 2020; Label: BSB Records; Format: Download
Troy Ave, Vol. 2	Released: August 28, 2020; Label: BSB Records; Format: Download
White Christmas 8	Released: December 25, 2020; Label: BSB Records; Format: Download
Kill or Be Killed	Released: May 7, 2021; Label: BSB Records; Format: Download
God Is Great Paper Straight	Released: November 26, 2021; Label: BSB Records; Format: Download
The 2022 Season	Released: February 4, 2022; Label: BSB Records; Format: Download
THE SUNDAY SERVICE	Released: April 22, 2022; Label: BSB Records; Format: Download

=== Singles ===
List of singles as lead artist, with selected chart positions, showing year released and album name
Title	Year	Album
"Hot Out"	2013	New York City: The Album
"New York City" (featuring Raekwon, N.O.R.E. and Prodigy)	2013	New York City: The Album
"Your Style" (featuring Lloyd Banks)	2014	BSB Vol. 4
"All About The Money" (featuring Young Lito & Manolo Rose)	2014	Non-album single
"All About The Money" (Remix) (featuring Young Jeezy & Rick Ross)	2014	Major Without a Deal
"Doo Doo"	2015	Major Without a Deal
"Bang Bang" (featuring 50 Cent)	2015	Major Without a Deal
"Do Betta" (featuring Ty Dolla Sign)	2015	Major Without a Deal
"She Belongs to the Game" (featuring Young Lito) Certification : Gold	2015	Non-album single

=== Promotional singles ===
List of promotional singles, showing year released and album name
Title	Year	Album
"Your Style (Remix)" (featuring Puff Daddy, T.I. and Ma$e)	2014	BSB Vol. 5 and Major Without A Deal

== Guest appearances ==
List of non-single guest appearances, with other performing artists, showing year released and album name
Title	Year	Other artist(s)	Album
"Only Life I Know"	2012	Fabolous	The S.O.U.L. Tape 2
"If It Aint About Money"	2014	Pyro Prada, Grand Hustle	SXEW Vol. 1: The Grand Hustle
"Self Made"	2014	Uncle Murda, GMG	Ain't Nothing Sweet
"What They Want"	2014	Drake, GMG, Raekwon, Drake, Tank, Jerry Wonda	Ain't Nothing Sweet
"Famous as Fuck"	2014	Pink Grenade	Fear of a Pink Planet
"Drug Money"	2015	Young Buck, 50 Cent	—N/a
