= Malibu (Miley Cyrus song) =

2017 single by Miley Cyrus

Single by Miley Cyrus

from the album Younger Now
- Released: May 11, 2017
- Studio: Capitol Studios (Los Angeles)
- Genre: Pop rock; soft rock
- Length: 3:51
- Label: RCA
- Composers: Miley Cyrus; Oren Yoel
- Lyricist: Miley Cyrus
- Producers: Oren Yoel; Miley Cyrus

Miley Cyrus singles chronology
"Lucy in the Sky with Diamonds" (2014)	"Malibu" (2017)	"Younger Now" (2017)

Music video
- "Malibu" on YouTube

"Malibu" is a song by American singer Miley Cyrus. It was released on May 11, 2017, by RCA Records as the lead single from her sixth studio album, Younger Now. Its lyrics were written by Cyrus and its music and production were done by her and Oren Yoel. The song first premiered on Beats 1 on May 11 and was then subsequently released for digital download and streaming that day. It was commercially successful, reaching the top 10 in the US, and number eleven in the UK. "Malibu" became Cyrus's ninth top-ten entry on the Billboard Hot 100 chart. The song has been certified sextuple-platinum in Australia, quadruple-platinum in Norway, triple platinum in Canada, double platinum in Spain and the United States, and platinum in multiple European territories, including the United Kingdom.

The song discusses Cyrus' relationship with her then-fiancé and The Last Song co-star, Liam Hemsworth. Critics viewed "Malibu" as indicative of Cyrus' transition into becoming a more mellow artist, and more removed from her previously controversial image. An accompanying music video was released on the same day as the song. It features Cyrus in various all-white outfits as she is shown frolicking in various outdoor locations.

== Background and release ==
It can so easily be generalized into a love song. I had to really heal myself individually, and then this song – about finding a new love with an old love, maybe you're finding a new freedom – is also about individuality and the freedom in that. And realizing that certain doors lead you to one place you never imagined you would be, and if that can be through a person, that's really awesome.

— Cyrus, speaking on Elvis Duran and the Morning Show regarding the song

Following the release of her fifth studio album, Miley Cyrus & Her Dead Petz, Cyrus resumed working on her upcoming sixth studio album. Cyrus announced in October 2016 that she was re-engaged to actor and now ex-husband Liam Hemsworth, with whom she starred in the Nicholas Sparks film adaptation of the novel of the same name, The Last Song. Cyrus wrote the lyrics to "Malibu" in June 2016, while taking an Uber on her way to her job on The Voice.

"Malibu" was first announced in a May 2017 cover story for Billboard magazine, where Cyrus announced that the song, which would be the lead single from her upcoming sixth studio album, which was later announced to be titled Younger Now, and it would be released on May 11, 2017. In the same interview, she also addressed being sober for three weeks prior, and noting that this affected the song. While its title references the city of Malibu, California, the song mainly discusses her relationship with Hemsworth. Cyrus described the song as being about "finding a new love with an old love", and about finding a "new freedom" in that. The production of the song was handled by Oren Yoel, with whom Cyrus worked on songs such as "Adore You".

The cover artwork of "Malibu" was revealed on May 10, showing Cyrus lying on top of the grass back in her backyard, with her engagement ring on; it was taken by Hemsworth. The song first premiered on Beats 1 on May 11, 2017, presented by Zane Lowe. It was then released for streaming on Apple Music and other streaming platforms.

== Composition and lyrical interpretation ==
Rolling Stone characterized the song as pop rock, whereas Spin described it as "SoCal soft rock". It is performed in the key of A♭ major with a tempo of 140 beats per minute. Cyrus' vocals span from E♭_{3} to E♭_{5}.

The song's lyrics differ from Cyrus's previous two albums, and provide introspection on her love life with Liam Hemsworth, whom she lived with in Malibu at the time of writing the song. The New York Times said Cyrus sings about "past insecurities, current contentment and 'Hoping I just stay the same, and nothing will change/And it'll be us, just for a while.'"

== Critical reception ==
"Malibu" received mixed reviews from music critics. The New York Times's Jon Pareles described the song as "nice as can be", saying, "The only shock is that there's no shock." Jon Blistein of Rolling Stone called "Malibu" a "stripped-down song ... [which] buoys Cyrus' simple vocals and lovestruck lyrics." Forbes writer Hugh McIntyre says "'Malibu' is unexpected upon first listen", and notes Cyrus "has gone in an Americana direction, opting for a guitar-based composition instead of the electronic sound her fans have become used to over the past few years." Joey Nolfi of Entertainment Weekly gave the song a positive review, describing it as "minimal, refreshing, and simple in tone", as well as "radio-friendly". Time's Raisa Bruner called "Malibu" a "stripped-down" and "breezy" track, and noted that the track deviates from her previous work, which included "zany stage antics" and "conversation-sparking politics".

Amanda Petrusich of The New Yorker recognised the musical strength of the song, stating "Musically, 'Malibu' is a mix of Laurel Canyon and Nashville, equal parts bohemian and smarmy; it is as if Dolly Parton were finally called upon to sing a late-era Stevie Nicks track"; however, the review called Cyrus' performance of it "lifeless", writing that her disposal to the hip-hop culture she once embraced now feels "disingenuous, if not sinister". Petrusich stated that "this is too bad, because Cyrus has a rich, husky voice, and, when she inhabits it with more gusto, like on her previous singles "The Climb" and "Wrecking Ball" it conveys both fragility and tremendous strength." Pitchfork writer Jillian Mapes found the song "sedated", "wholly inoffensive", and "a shrug of a song", while saying that "[Malibu is] so breezy, it makes Sheryl Crow seem edgy, or Lady Gaga's Joanne resemble a legit rock'n'roll reinvention." Variety writer Chris Willman called it "sweet" and "deeply felt", praising Cyrus's "guilelessness" and Oren Yoel's production skills while also comparing her sound on the song to that of Seals and Crofts, but adding that the track itself has "any number of clunker lines" and non-sequiturs. Spin's Andy Cush said that while it boasts "earnest lyrics, unfussy production with handclaps and clean electric guitars, [and] a mild twang to remind you of her status as the progeny of a country star", he found the track to be "utterly inoffensive" and that Cyrus's persona in "Malibu" felt like "her most deliberately constructed persona yet", while likening her sound to that of Sheryl Crow and Don Henley.

== Commercial performance ==
In the United States, with less than a day of tracking, "Malibu" debuted at number 64 on the Billboard Hot 100 with 29,000 downloads and 4 million streams. In its first full week, the single soared to number 10 with 77,000 copies sold (106,000 total), 21.5 million streams, and logged 13.5 million in airplay audience. The feat makes "Malibu" Cyrus' ninth top 10 entry on the chart and her first since "Wrecking Ball" in 2013. On the Billboard Adult Contemporary chart the song debuted at number 27 the week of July 15, 2017 with 103 spins and 0.167 million audience impressions across American adult contemporary radio stations. "Malibu" has moved 1 million equivalent units in the United States as of September 2017.

In United Kingdom, the single debuted at number eleven on the UK Singles Chart, becoming her fourth song to peak at this position. In Oceania, "Malibu" peaked at number three on the ARIA Charts in Australia and at number four on the Official New Zealand Music Chart.

== Music video ==
The music video for "Malibu" was released on May 11, 2017, and was directed by Cyrus and Diane Martel. It features several shots of Cyrus on a beach with balloons, sitting in front of a waterfall, in wildflower fields, and running with a dog, all while dressed in various white outfits. In the video, she also shows her engagement ring. The video garnered over 50 million views within its first two weeks. As of July 2024, it has over 530 million views.

== Live performances ==
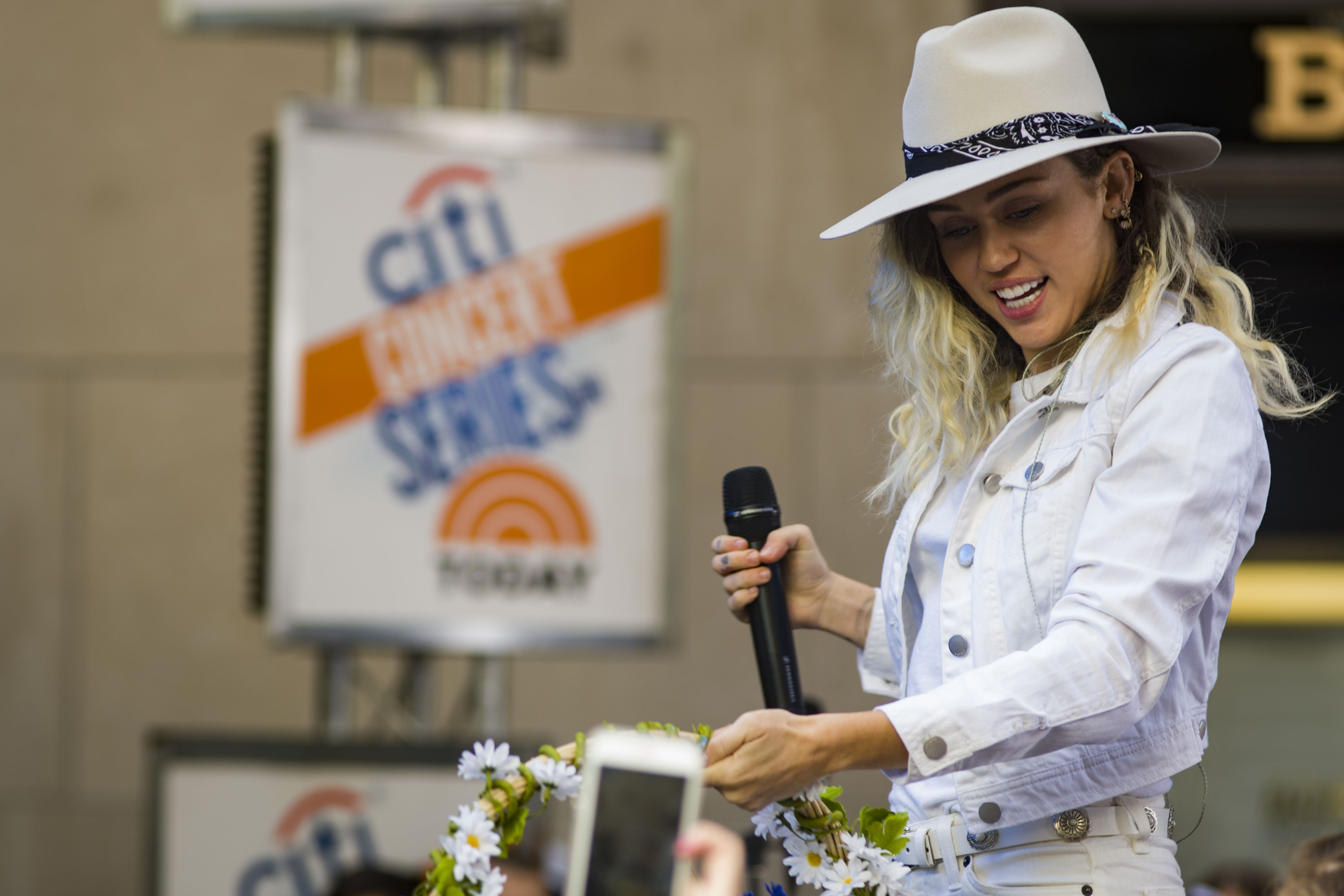
Cyrus performed the single on the Today Show on May 26, 2017.

Cyrus performed "Malibu" live for the first time at Wango Tango on May 13, 2017, as a special guest performer. A little over a week later, she gave her first televised performance of the track at the 2017 Billboard Music Awards on May 21. She was introduced by both her father, Billy Ray Cyrus, and sister, Noah Cyrus, before performing the song. She wore a pair of white jean shorts, a white crop top, and a tan cowboy hat. Cyrus began to choke up towards the end of the performance, becoming teary-eyed and thanking her fans. A day later, she performed the song on The Voice finale, in front of a forest-themed backdrop similar to in the song's music video. She prefaced the performance by dedicating it to Ariana Grande and the victims of the Manchester Arena bombing, which had occurred 2 two days prior to her performance, saying, "I'd like to dedicate this song to my good friend Ariana Grande and to everyone who experienced that horrific attack yesterday. Our hearts are with you." On May 26, Cyrus also performed the song on the Today show as part as their Citi Concert series.

On June 10, Cyrus performed "Malibu" during the iHeartRadio Summer Pool Party. She also performed the song on The Tonight Show Starring Jimmy Fallon, along with "Inspired" which Fallon called her "the real deal", the following Wednesday. On September 15, Cyrus performed "Malibu" for the BBC Radio 1 Live Lounge, accompanied with other songs like "Younger Now", "See You Again", "Party in the U.S.A." and a cover of Roberta Flack's "The First Time Ever I Saw Your Face".

== Track listing ==
Digital download

1. "Malibu" – 3:51

Digital download – The Him Remix

1. "Malibu" (The Him Remix) – 3:38

Digital download – Tiësto Remix

1. "Malibu" (Tiësto Remix) – 3:19

Digital download – Lost Frequencies Remix

1. "Malibu" (Lost Frequencies Remix) – 3:20

Digital download – Gigamesh Remix

1. "Malibu" (Gigamesh Remix) – 3:22

Digital download – Dillon Francis Remix

1. "Malibu" (Dillon Francis Remix) – 3:41

Digital download – Alan Walker Remix

1. "Malibu" (Alan Walker Remix) – 3:06

== Charts ==
=== Weekly charts ===
Chart (2017)	Peak position
Argentina Anglo (Monitor Latino)	17
Australia (ARIA)	3
Austria (Ö3 Austria Top 40)	8
Belgium (Ultratop 50 Flanders)	27
Belgium (Ultratip Bubbling Under Wallonia)	1
Canada Hot 100 (Billboard)	4
Canada AC (Billboard)	29
Canada CHR/Top 40 (Billboard)	17
Canada Hot AC (Billboard)	14
Croatia (HRT)	20
Czech Republic Airplay (ČNS IFPI)	5
Czech Republic Singles Digital (ČNS IFPI)	4
Denmark (Tracklisten)	14
Euro Digital Songs (Billboard)	7
Finland (Suomen virallinen lista)	12
France (SNEP)	85
Germany (GfK)	20
Greece Digital Songs (Billboard)	4
Guatemala (Monitor Latino)	18
Hungary (Rádiós Top 40)	26
Hungary (Single Top 40)	15
Ireland (IRMA)	7
Italy (FIMI)	24
Lebanon (Lebanese Top 20)	20
Mexico (Billboard Mexican Airplay)	20
Netherlands (Dutch Top 40)	12
Netherlands (Single Top 100)	30
New Zealand (Recorded Music NZ)	4
Norway (VG-lista)	4
Paraguay (Monitor Latino)	14
Philippines (Philippine Hot 100)	17
Poland Airplay (ZPAV)	25
Portugal (AFP)	12
Scottish Singles Sales (Official Charts)	2
Spain (Promusicae)	20
Sweden (Sverigetopplistan)	21
Switzerland (Schweizer Hitparade)	16
UK Singles (Official Charts)	11
Uruguay (Monitor Latino)	13
US Billboard Hot 100	10
US Adult Contemporary (Billboard)	22
US Adult Pop Airplay (Billboard)	14
US Dance Club Songs (Billboard)	1
US Dance Airplay (Billboard)	19
US Pop Airplay (Billboard)	16

=== Year-end charts ===
Chart (2017)	Position
Australia (ARIA)	47
Austria (Ö3 Austria Top 40)	47
Belgium (Ultratop Flanders)	95
Canada (Canadian Hot 100)	44
Denmark (Tracklisten)	87
Iceland (Tónlistinn)	42
Latvia Airplay (LaIPA)	37
Hungary (Single Top 40)	56
Hungary (Stream Top 40)	79
Netherlands (Dutch Top 40)	74
Portugal (AFP)	80
Spain (PROMUSICAE)	87
Switzerland (Schweizer Hitparade)	79
UK Singles (Official Charts Company)	81
US Billboard Hot 100	89
US Dance Club Songs (Billboard)	49

== Certifications ==
Region	Certification	Certified units/sales
Australia (ARIA)	6× Platinum	420,000^{‡}
Austria (IFPI Austria)	Platinum	30,000^{‡}
Belgium (BRMA)	Gold	10,000^{‡}
Brazil (Pro-Música Brasil)	Diamond	250,000^{‡}
Canada (Music Canada)	3× Platinum	240,000^{‡}
Denmark (IFPI Danmark)	Platinum	90,000^{‡}
France (SNEP)	Gold	100,000^{‡}
Germany (BVMI)	Gold	200,000^{‡}
Italy (FIMI)	Platinum	50,000^{‡}
Mexico (AMPROFON)	4× Platinum	240,000^{‡}
New Zealand (RMNZ)	4× Platinum	120,000^{‡}
Norway (IFPI Norway)	4× Platinum	240,000^{‡}
Poland (ZPAV)	Platinum	20,000^{‡}
Portugal (AFP)	Gold	5,000^{‡}
Spain (Promusicae)	2× Platinum	120,000^{‡}
Sweden (GLF)	Platinum	40,000^{‡}
Switzerland (IFPI Switzerland)	Platinum	20,000^{‡}
United Kingdom (BPI)	2× Platinum	1,200,000^{‡}
United States (RIAA)	2× Platinum	2,000,000^{‡}
^{‡} Sales+streaming figures based on certification alone.

== Release history ==
List of regions and release dates, showing formats, labels and references
Region	Date	Format(s)	Version	Label	Ref.
Various	May 12, 2017	Digital download; streaming	Original	RCA	
Italy	May 12, 2017	Radio airplay	Original	Sony	
United States	May 15, 2017	Adult contemporary radio; hot adult contemporary music; modern adult contemporary radio	Original	RCA	
United States	May 16, 2017	Contemporary hit radio	Original	RCA	
Various	June 9, 2017	Digital download	The Him remix	RCA	
Various	June 23, 2017	Digital download	Tiësto remix	RCA	
Various	June 23, 2017	Digital download	Lost Frequencies remix	RCA	
Various	June 23, 2017	Digital download	Gigamesh remix	RCA	
Various	June 30, 2017	Digital download	Dillon Francis remix	RCA	
Various	June 30, 2017	Digital download	Alan Walker remix	RCA	
