= Oren Yoel =

American singer-songwriter

- Origin: Los Angeles, California, U.S.
- Occupations: Record producer; multi instrumentalist; songwriter
- Years active: 2008–present
- Website: orenyoel.com

Oren Yoel is an American record producer, songwriter, and multi-instrumentalist who has amassed 3.7 billion streams and 20 million records sold worldwide.

== Career ==
Yoel produced the bulk of Asher Roth’s Asleep in the Bread Aisle including songs "Lark on My Go-Kart" and "Be by Myself". He later worked with numerous recording artists including Miley Cyrus, XXXTentacion, Joji, Bryce Vine, They (duo) and Fitz and the Tantrums.

Yoel's song with Miley Cyrus "Adore You", which he co wrote and produced, charted at #21 Billboard & #15 on the Top 40. The song received positive critical response for Miley Cyrus's 'versatile voice'. 2013 also saw the release of Parachute's breakout album Overnight with Oren producing "Can't Help" with Ryan Tedder

Part of Adidas "All or Nothing Campaign" included a track by Kanye West called "God Level" which was produced by Hudson Mohawke, 88-Keys, Mike Dean, Noah Goldstein, and West.

Yoel, Ryan Tedder, and Noel Zancanella co-produced Rozzi Crane's "Painkiller" featuring Adam Levine off of her Space EP which was released in February 2015. Stacy Barthe's 2015 debut album, BEcoming, featured "In My Head" produced by Oren.

Unbreakable Smile, Tori Kelly's debut album features "Art of Letting You Go", which Oren Yoel produced and co-wrote.

On August 30, 2015, Miley Cyrus announced and released her fifth studio album Miley Cyrus & Her Dead Petz. Oren produced four songs from the album, "Space Bootz", "BB Talk", "I Get So Scared", and "1 Sun".

In 2017, Miley Cyrus announced and released her single "Malibu" written by Cyrus and produced by Oren. The song hit the top 10 after its second week on the Billboard Hot 100. He was also the main producer and co-writer on the rest of the parent album, Younger Now.

Oren Yoel was a co-writer on XXXTentacion's new album ? on the track "NUMB" released in March 2018. In that same year Oren Yoel was a producer/co-writer on multiple releases. This includes 88rising's Head in the Clouds album for the song "Peach Jam" featuring Joji and BlocBoy JB, Lupe Fiasco's "Kingdom" featuring Damian Marley off of his album "Drogas Wave", and THEY.'s EP "Fireside" for the song "Tell Me" featuring Vic Mensa.

2019 saw the release of the Fitz and the Tantrums album All the Feels with two songs, "Belladonna" and "Stop", produced and co-written by Oren Yoel. Also the deluxe version of XXXTentacion's ? was released with an acoustic version of "NUMB", co-written by Oren Yoel.. This year also saw the release of Ben Platt's debut studio album Sing To Me Instead with Oren Yoel co-writing the song "Share Your Address"

In 2024, Oren Yoel was part of the team that produced Schoolboy Q's album Blue Lips. Met with widespread acclaim, Oren produced three songs from the album, "Cooties", "Love Birds", and "First". The end of 2024 saw Oren Yoel produce and cowrite a range of artists including Dasha's "Heartbreaker from Tennessee" and Jeleel's Xistence.

2025 saw many releases by Oren Yoel including the collaboration with James The Seventh whose recent releases has garnered her plenty of attention as a new and upcoming artist.
