= Miley Cyrus =

American singer and actress (born 1992)

- Cyrus during the 2024 Grammy Awards
- Born: Destiny Hope Cyrus; November 23, 1992 (age 33); Franklin, Tennessee, U.S.
- Other names: Miley Ray Cyrus; Miley Ray Hemsworth (Note: While married to Liam Hemsworth (2018–2020))
- Occupations: Singer; songwriter; actress; director
- Years active: 2001–present
- Organizations: Happy Hippie Foundation; the Miley Cyrus Foundation
- Works: Discography (Note: For her discography as Hannah Montana, see Hannah Montana discography.); songs; videos; performances
- Spouses: Liam Hemsworth (m. 2018; div. 2020) Maxx Morando (m. 2026)
- Parents: Billy Ray Cyrus (father); Tish Cyrus (mother)
- Relatives: Ron Cyrus (grandfather); Trace Cyrus (half-brother); Noah Cyrus (sister); Brandi Cyrus (half-sister)
- Awards: Full list
- Musical career
- Genres: Pop; rock
- Instruments: Vocals; guitar; piano
- Labels: Hollywood; RCA; Columbia; Atlantic
- Website: mileyofficial.com

Miley Ray Cyrus (/ˈmaɪli ˈsaɪrəs/ MY-lee SY-rəs; born Destiny Hope Cyrus, November 23, 1992) is an American singer, songwriter, and actress. An influential figure in popular music, Cyrus is known for her evolving artistry and image reinventions. She was an established child actress before developing a successful entertainment career as an adult. Cyrus emerged as a teen idol with her portrayal of Miley Stewart in the Disney Channel television series Hannah Montana (2006–2011), growing a profitable franchise and achieving two number-one soundtracks on the US Billboard 200.

Cyrus's music career outside of Hannah Montana began with her US number-one albums Meet Miley Cyrus (2007) and Breakout (2008). "Party in the U.S.A.", from her EP The Time of Our Lives (2009), became one of the best-selling singles in the United States. She explored a more provocative image with the dance-pop album Can't Be Tamed (2010) and the trap-infused album Bangerz (2013). The latter's singles "We Can't Stop" and "Wrecking Ball" reached numbers two and one on the US Billboard Hot 100 respectively. She explored psychedelic, country, and rock genres on Miley Cyrus & Her Dead Petz (2015), Younger Now (2017), and Plastic Hearts (2020). Her eighth studio album, Endless Summer Vacation (2023), spawned her second US number-one single "Flowers", which became the best-selling single of 2023 and won two Grammy Awards, including Record of the Year. Her following albums, Something Beautiful (2025) and Bass Persuades (2026), received mixed critical and commercial success.

As an actress and television personality, Cyrus starred in the films Bolt (2008), Hannah Montana: The Movie (2009), The Last Song (2010), LOL (2012), and So Undercover (2013). On television, she was the subject of the documentary Miley: The Movement (2013), served as a coach on two seasons of The Voice (2016–2017), and starred in the miniseries Crisis in Six Scenes (2017) and an episode of Black Mirror (2019). She also hosted the holiday special Miley's New Year's Eve Party (2021–2022).

Cyrus has received various accolades, including three Grammy Awards, one Brit Award, five Billboard Music Awards, three MTV Video Music Awards, and eight Guinness World Records. She has received a star on the Hollywood Walk of Fame, was named a Disney Legend, and ranked among the greatest pop stars of the 21st century by Billboard. Cyrus is also the ninth-highest-certified female digital singles artist by the RIAA. She has featured in lists such as the Time 100 (2008 and 2014), Forbes 30 under 30 in the music category, and Forbes Celebrity 100 (2010 and 2015). In 2014, she founded the Happy Hippie Foundation, focusing on the LGBTQ community and youth homelessness.

== Early life and career beginnings ==
Destiny Hope Cyrus was born on November 23, 1992, in Franklin, Tennessee, to Leticia "Tish" Jean Cyrus (née Finley) and country singer Billy Ray Cyrus. She was born with supraventricular tachycardia, a condition causing an abnormal resting heart rate. Her birth name, Destiny Hope, expressed her parents' belief that she would accomplish great things. Her parents nicknamed her "Smiley", which they later shortened to "Miley", because she often smiled as an infant. In 2008, she legally changed her name to Miley Ray Cyrus; her middle name honors her grandfather, Democratic politician Ronald Ray Cyrus, who was from Kentucky. Cyrus's godmother was singer-songwriter Dolly Parton.

Against the advice of her father's record company, Cyrus's parents secretly married on December 28, 1993, a year after her birth. They had two more children, son Braison and daughter Noah. From a previous relationship, her mother has two other children, Brandi and Trace. Her father's first child, Christopher Cody, was born in April 1992 and grew up separately with his mother, waitress Kristin Luckey, in South Carolina.

All of Cyrus's maternal siblings are established entertainers. Trace was a vocalist and guitarist for the electronic pop band Metro Station. Noah is an actress and, along with Braison, models, sings, and is a songwriter. Brandi was formerly a musician for the indie rock band Frank + Derol and is a professional DJ. The Cyrus farmhouse is located on 500 acres of land outside Nashville.

Cyrus attended Heritage Elementary School in Williamson County while she and her family lived in Thompson's Station, Tennessee. When she was cast in Hannah Montana, the family moved to Los Angeles and she attended Options for Youth Charter Schools studying with a private tutor on set. Raised as a Christian, she was baptized in a Southern Baptist church before moving to Hollywood in 2005. She attended church regularly while growing up and wore a purity ring. In 2001, when Cyrus was eight, she and her family moved to Toronto, Canada, while her father filmed the television series Doc. After Billy Ray Cyrus took her to see a 2001 Mirvish production of Mamma Mia! at the Royal Alexandra Theatre, Miley Cyrus grabbed his arm and told him, "This is what I want to do, daddy. I want to be an actress." She began to take singing and acting lessons at the Armstrong Acting Studio in Toronto.

Cyrus's first acting role was as Kylie in her father's television series Doc. In 2003, she received credit under her birth name for her role as "Young Ruthie" in Tim Burton's Big Fish. During this period, she auditioned with Taylor Lautner for the feature film The Adventures of Sharkboy and Lavagirl in 3-D. Although she was one of two finalists for the role, she chose to appear in Hannah Montana instead. Her mother took on the role of Miley's manager and worked to acquire a team to build her daughter's career. Cyrus signed with Mitchell Gossett, director of the youth division at Cunningham Escott Slevin Doherty. Gossett is often credited with "discovering" Cyrus and played a key role in her auditioning for Hannah Montana. She later signed with Jason Morey of Morey Management Group to handle her music career; Dolly Parton steered her to him. She hired her father's finance manager as part of her team.

== Career ==
=== 2006–2009: Hannah Montana and early musical releases ===
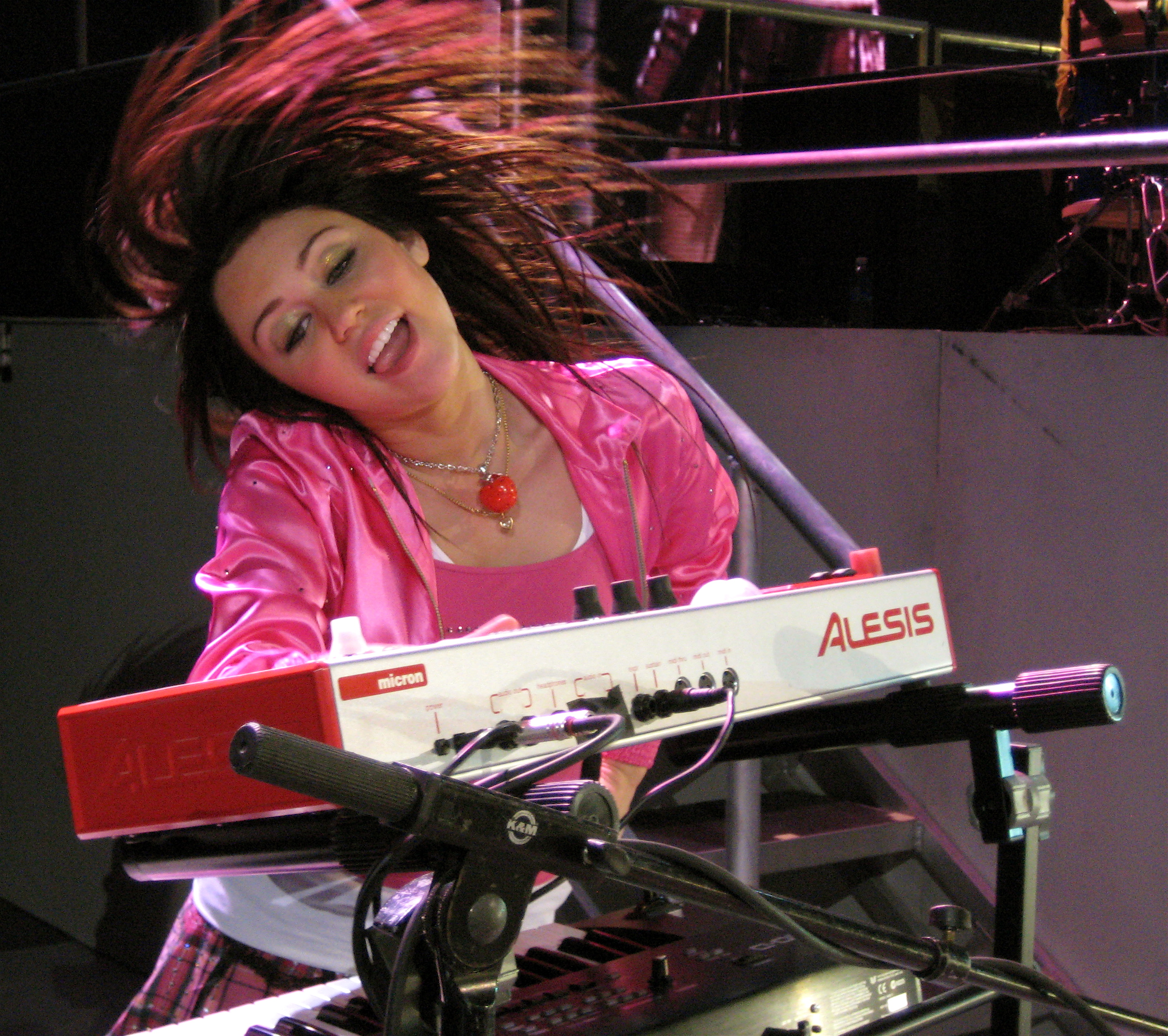
Cyrus performing on her Best of Both Worlds Tour in 2007

Cyrus auditioned for the Disney Channel television series Hannah Montana when she was thirteen years old. She auditioned for the role of the best friend, Lilly Truscott, but was called to audition for the primary character instead seeing her comical performance. Despite being denied the part at first because she was "too small and too young" for the role, she was later cast as Miley Stewart because of her singing and goofy acting abilities. The series premiered in March 2006 to the largest audience for a Disney Channel program and quickly ranked among the highest-rated series on basic cable. The success of the series led to Cyrus' being labeled a "teen idol". She toured with the Cheetah Girls as Hannah Montana in September 2006 and performed songs from the show's first season. Walt Disney Records released a soundtrack credited to Cyrus's character in October of that year. The record was both a critical and commercial success, topping the Billboard 200 chart in the United States; it went on to sell over three million copies worldwide. With the release of the soundtrack, Cyrus became the first act within the Walt Disney Company to have deals in television, film, consumer products, and music.

Cyrus signed a four-album deal with Hollywood Records to distribute music under her own persona. She released the two-disc album Hannah Montana 2: Meet Miley Cyrus in June 2007. The first disc was credited as the second soundtrack by "Hannah Montana", while the second disc served as Cyrus's debut studio album. The album became her second to reach the top of the Billboard 200, and has sold over three million copies. Months after the release of the project, "See You Again" (2007) was released as the lead single from the album. The song was a commercial success, and has sold over two million copies in the United States since its release. She collaborated with her father on the single "Ready, Set, Don't Go" (2007). Next Cyrus embarked on her highly successful Best of Both Worlds Tour (2007–08) to promote its release. Ticketmaster officials commented that "there [hadn't] been a demand of this level or intensity since The Beatles or Elvis." The tour's success led to the theatrical release of the 3D concert film Hannah Montana & Miley Cyrus: Best of Both Worlds Concert (2008). While initially intended to be a limited release, the film's success led to a longer run.

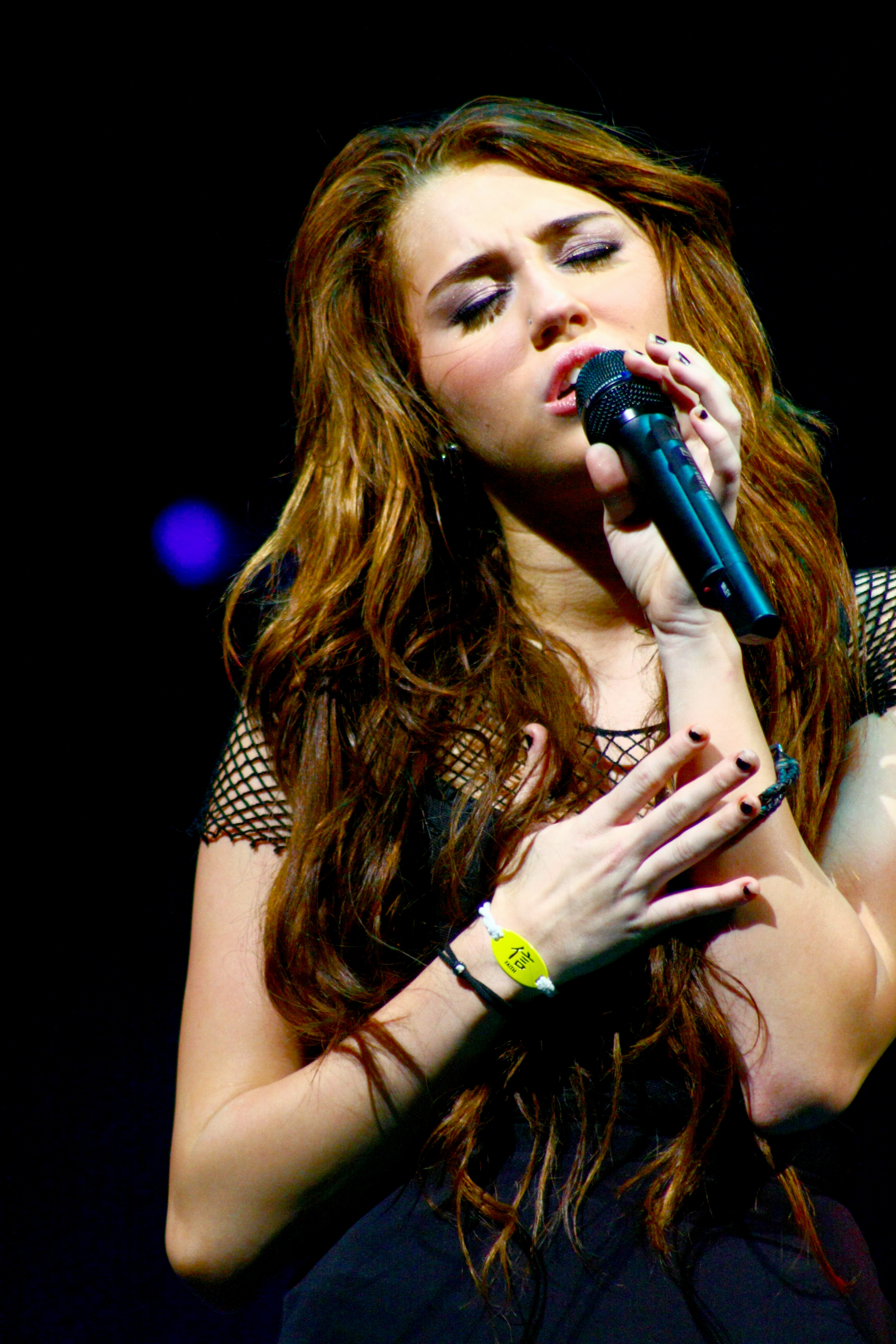
Cyrus singing on her 2009 Wonder World Tour

Cyrus and friend Mandy Jiroux began posting videos on YouTube in February 2008, referring to the clips as "The Miley and Mandy Show"; the videos garnered a large online following. In April 2008, several pictures of Cyrus in her underwear and swimsuit were leaked online by a teenager who hacked her Gmail account. Further controversy erupted when it was reported that the then-15-year-old Cyrus had posed topless during a photo shoot by Annie Leibovitz for Vanity Fair. The New York Times subsequently clarified that although the shot left the impression that Cyrus was bare-breasted, she was wrapped in a bed sheet and was not topless.

Cyrus went on to release her second studio album, Breakout (2008), in June of that year. The album earned the highest first-week sales of her career thus far and became her third to top the Billboard 200. Cyrus later starred with John Travolta in the animated film Bolt (2008), her debut as a film actress; she also co-wrote the song "I Thought I Lost You" (2008) for the film, which she sings as a duet with Travolta. The film was both a critical and commercial success and earned her a Golden Globe Award nomination for Best Original Song.

In March 2009, Cyrus released "The Climb" (2009) as a single from the soundtrack to Hannah Montana: The Movie. It was met with a warm critical and commercial reaction, becoming a crossover hit in both pop and country music formats. The soundtrack, which features the single, went on to become Cyrus's fourth entry to top the Billboard 200; at age 16, she became the youngest artist in history to have four number-one albums on the chart. She released her fourth soundtrack as Hannah Montana in July 2009, which debuted at number two on the Billboard 200. Cyrus later launched her first fashion line, Miley Cyrus and Max Azria, through Walmart. It was promoted by the release of "Party in the U.S.A." (2009) and the EP The Time of Our Lives (2009). Cyrus said the record was "a transitioning album [...] really to introduce people to what I want my next record to sound like and with time I will be able to do that a little more". "Party in the U.S.A." became one of Cyrus's most successful singles to date and is considered to be one of her signature songs. She embarked on her first world tour, the Wonder World Tour (2009) which was a critical and commercial success. On December 7, 2009, Cyrus performed for Queen Elizabeth II and other members of the British royal family at the Royal Variety Performance in Blackpool, Lancashire. Billboard ranked her as the fourth best-selling female music artist of 2009.

=== 2010–2012: New image with Can't Be Tamed and focus on acting ===
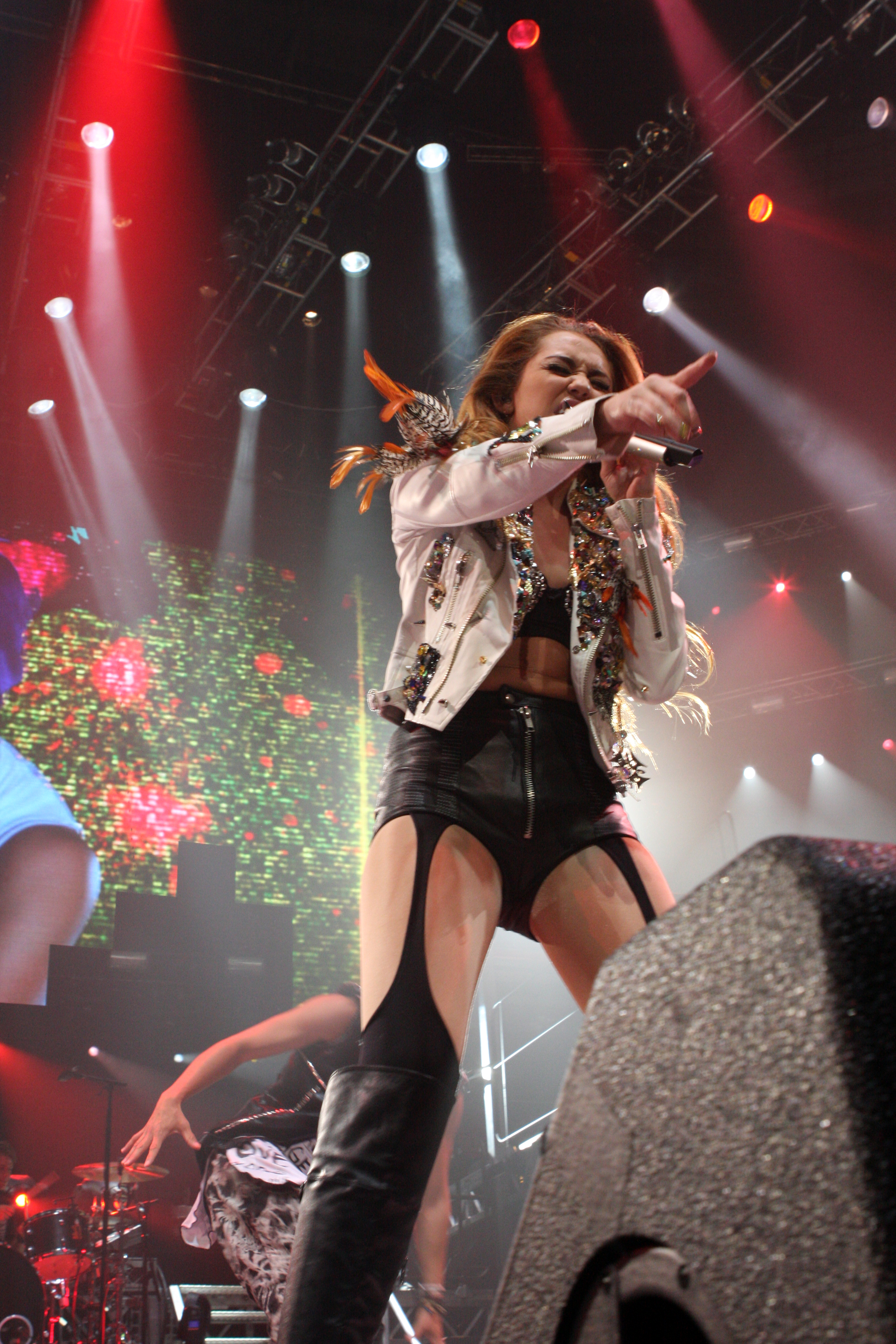
Cyrus performing on her Gypsy Heart Tour in São Paulo, 2011

Hoping to foster a more mature image, Cyrus starred in the film The Last Song (2010), based on the Nicholas Sparks novel. It was met with negative critical reviews but was a box office hit. Cyrus further attempted to shift her image with the release of her third studio album, Can't Be Tamed (2010). The album featured a more dance-oriented sound than her prior releases and stirred a considerable amount of controversy over its lyrical content and Cyrus's live performances. It sold 106,000 copies in its first week of release and became her first studio album not to top the Billboard 200 chart in the United States. Cyrus released her final soundtrack as Hannah Montana in October 2010; it was seen as a commercial failure due to its low position on the charts compared to her previous albums.

Cyrus was the subject of further controversy when a video posted online in December 2010 showed her, then aged eighteen, smoking salvia with a bong. 2010 ended with her ranking at number thirteen on the Forbes Celebrity 100 list. She embarked on her worldwide Gypsy Heart Tour in April 2011 which had no North American dates; she cited her various controversial moments as the reason, claiming that she only wanted to travel where she felt "the most love". Following the release of Can't Be Tamed, Cyrus officially parted ways with Hollywood Records. With her obligations to Hannah Montana fulfilled, Cyrus announced her plans to take a hiatus from music so she could focus on her acting career. She confirmed she would not be going to college.

Cyrus hosted the March 5, 2011, episode of Saturday Night Live where she poked fun at her recent controversies. That November it was announced that Cyrus would be the voice of Mavis in the animated film Hotel Transylvania; however by February 2012 she was dropped from the project and replaced with Selena Gomez. At the time Cyrus said her reason for leaving the movie was wanting to work on her music; later it was revealed the real reason behind her exit was because she bought her then-boyfriend Liam Hemsworth a birthday cake shaped like a penis and licked it. She made an appearance on the MTV television series Punk'd with Kelly Osbourne and Khloé Kardashian. Cyrus starred alongside Demi Moore in the independent film LOL (2012). The film had a limited release; it was a critical and commercial failure. She starred in the comedy film So Undercover playing the role of an undercover FBI agent at a college sorority.

Cyrus released a string of live performances known as the Backyard Sessions on YouTube during the spring and summer of 2012; the performances were of classic songs she personally liked. She collaborated with producers Rock Mafia on their song "Morning Sun" (2012), which was made available for free download online. She had previously appeared in the music video for their debut single, "The Big Bang" (2010). Cyrus later provided guest vocals on "Decisions" (2012) by Borgore. Both Cyrus and Hemsworth appeared in the song's music video. She went on to guest star as Missi in two episodes of the CBS sitcom Two and a Half Men. Cyrus drew significant media attention when she cut her traditionally long, brown hair in favor of a blonde, pixie cut; she commented that she had "never felt more [herself] in [her] whole life" and that "it really changed [her] life."

=== 2013–2015: Bangerz and Miley Cyrus & Her Dead Petz ===
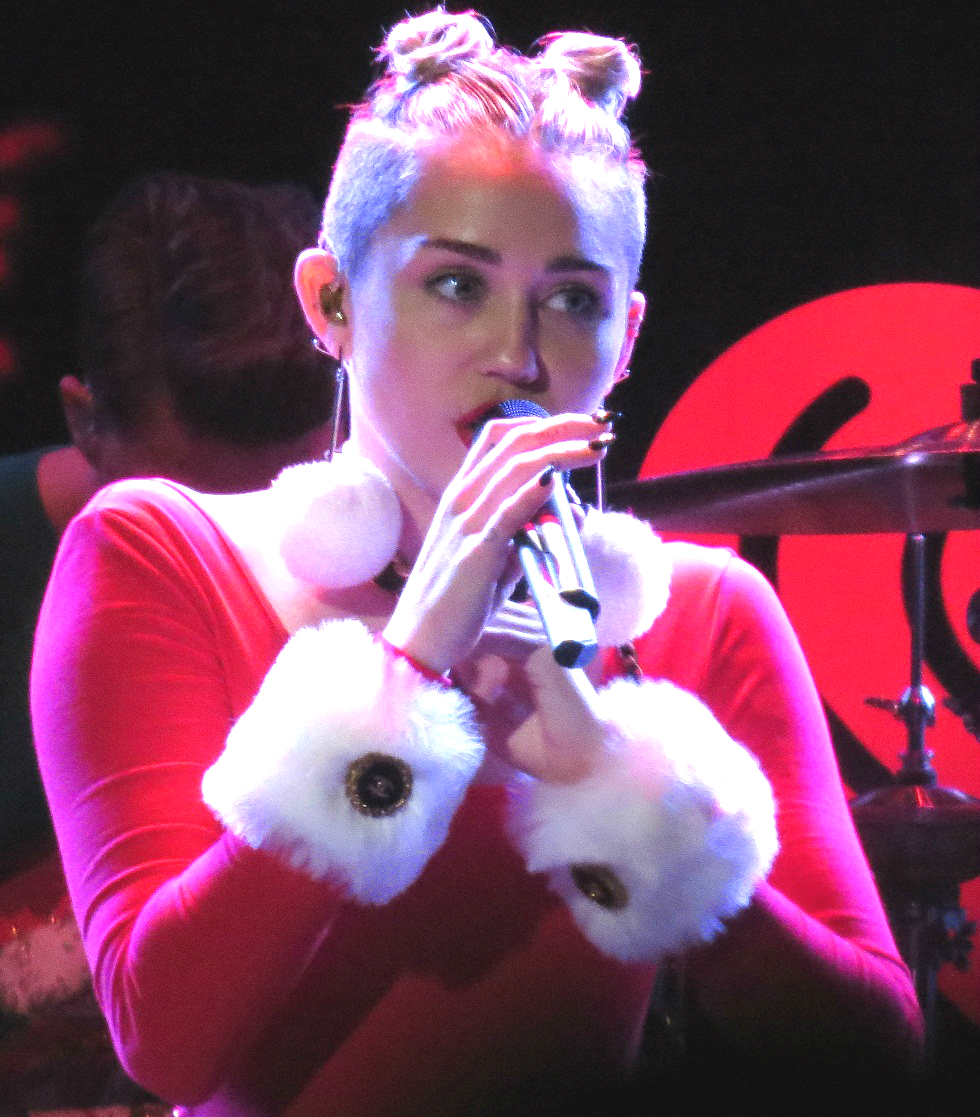
Cyrus performing at the 2013 Jingle Ball in Tampa, Florida

In 2013, Cyrus hired Larry Rudolph to be her manager, best known for previously representing Britney Spears. It was confirmed that Cyrus had signed with RCA Records for her future releases. She worked with producers such as Pharrell Williams and Mike Will Made-It on her fourth studio album, resulting in a hip hop-influenced sound. She collaborated with numerous hip hop artists releases and appeared on the Snoop Lion song "Ashtrays and Heartbreaks" (2013), released as the lead single from his twelfth studio album, Reincarnated. She collaborated with will.i.am on the song "Fall Down" (2013), released as a promotional single that same month. The song entered the Billboard Hot 100 at number fifty-eight, marking her first appearance on the chart since "Can't Be Tamed" (2010). She provided guest vocals on the Lil Twist song "Twerk", which also featured vocals by Justin Bieber. The song was unreleased for unknown reasons but leaked online. On May 23, 2013, it was confirmed that Cyrus would be featured on the Mike Will Made It single "23", with Wiz Khalifa and Juicy J. The single went on to peak at number eleven on the Hot 100, and had sold over one million copies worldwide as of 2013.

Cyrus released her new single "We Can't Stop" on June 3. Touted as her comeback single, it became a worldwide commercial success, topping charts in territories such as the United Kingdom. The song's music video set the Vevo record for most views within twenty-four hours of release and became the first to reach 100 million views on the site. Cyrus performed with Robin Thicke at the 2013 MTV Video Music Awards, a performance that resulted in widespread media attention and public scrutiny. Her simulated sex acts with a foam finger were described as "disturbing" and the whole performance as "cringe-worthy". Cyrus released "Wrecking Ball" (2013) as the second single from Bangerz on the same day as the VMAs. The accompanying music video, which showed her swinging naked on a wrecking ball, was viewed over nineteen million times within 24 hours of its release, and drew criticism from some for allegedly objectifying Cyrus, including fellow singer Sinéad O'Connor, who said that "you will obscure your talent by allowing yourself to be pimped, whether it's the music business or yourself doing the pimping". Despite this, the single became Cyrus's first to top the Hot 100 in the US, and maintained the number-one spot for three weeks. It sold over two million copies.

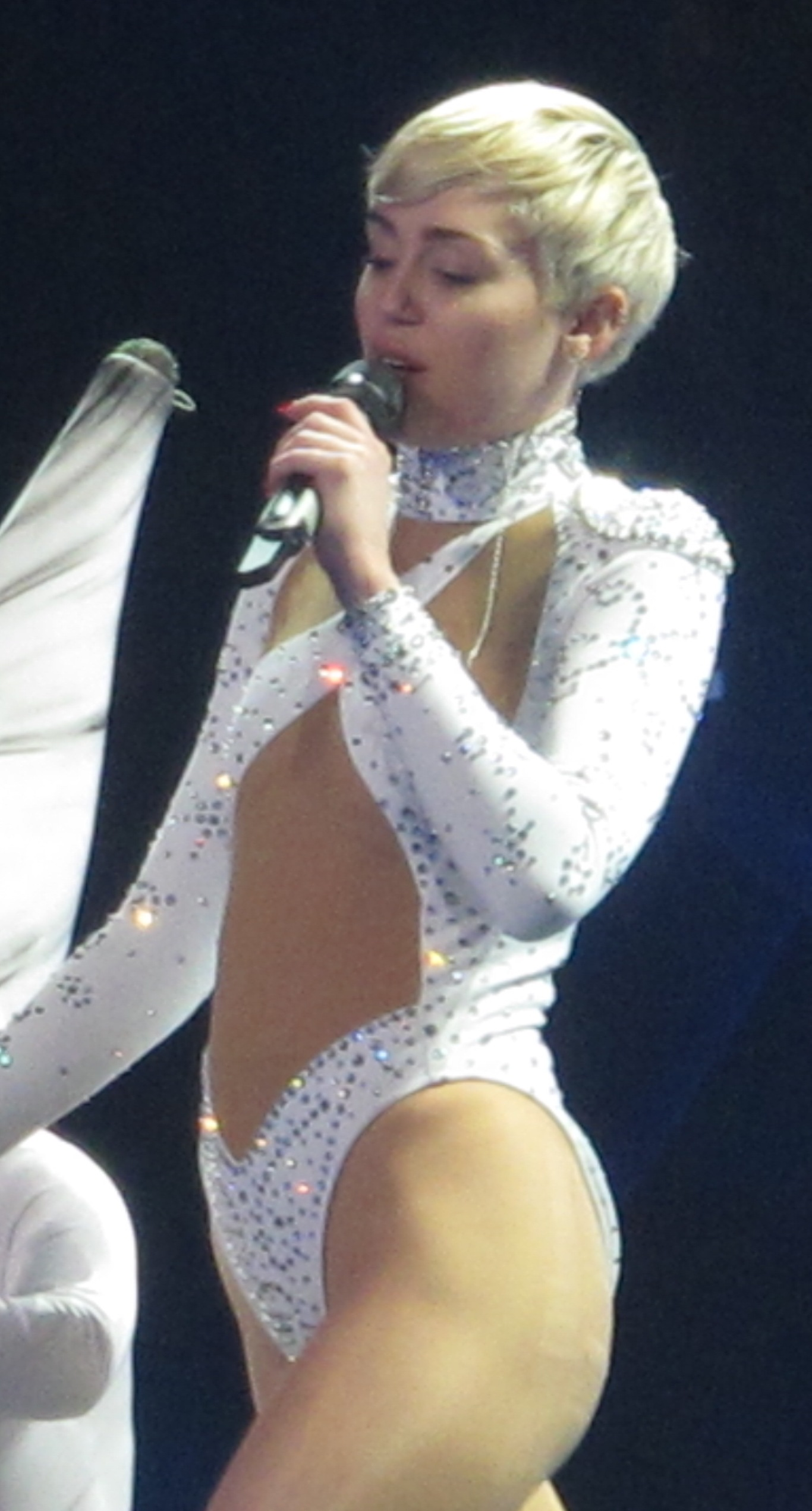
Cyrus performing on her 2014 Bangerz Tour

On October 2, 2013, MTV aired the documentary Miley: The Movement, that chronicled the recording of her fourth studio album Bangerz, which was released on October 4. The album was a commercial success, debuting at number one on the Billboard 200 with first week sales of 270,000 copies. On October 5, Cyrus hosted Saturday Night Live for the second time. On November 5, Cyrus featured on rapper Future's "Real and True" with Mr. Hudson; an accompanying music video premiered five days later on November 10, 2013. On December 9, 2013, she was declared Artist of the Year by MTV.

On January 29, 2014, she played an acoustic concert show on MTV Unplugged, performing songs from Bangerz featuring a guest appearance by Madonna. It became the highest-rated MTV Unplugged in the past decade, with over 1.7 million streams. Cyrus was also featured in the Marc Jacobs Spring 2014 campaign along with Natalie Westling and Esmerelda Seay Reynolds. She launched her controversial Bangerz Tour (2014) that year, which was positively received by critics. Two months into her tour, Cyrus's Alaskan Klee Kai was found mauled to death at her home after fighting with a coyote. Two weeks later, Cyrus suffered an allergic reaction to the antibiotic cephalexin, prescribed to treat a sinus infection, resulting in her hospitalization in Kansas City. Though she rescheduled some of her US tour dates, she resumed the tour two weeks later, beginning with the European leg.

While collaborating with the Flaming Lips on their remake of the Beatles' Sgt. Pepper's Lonely Hearts Club Band, With a Little Help from My Fwends, Cyrus began working with Wayne Coyne on her fifth studio album. She said that she was taking her time to focus on the music, and that the album would not be released until she felt it was ready. Coyne compared his collaborative material with Cyrus to the catalogs of Pink Floyd and Portishead and described their sound as being "a slightly wiser, sadder, more true version" of Cyrus's pop music output. Cyrus also worked on the films The Night Before (2015) and A Very Murray Christmas (2015) during this period; both roles were cameos.

Reports began to surface in 2015 that Cyrus was working on two albums simultaneously, one of which she hoped to release at no charge. This was confirmed by her manager who claimed she was willing to end her contract with RCA Records if they refused to let her release a free album. Cyrus was the host of the 2015 MTV Video Music Awards, making her its first openly pansexual host, and gave a surprise performance of a new song "Dooo It!" (2015) during the show's finale. Immediately following the performance, Cyrus announced that her fifth studio album, Miley Cyrus & Her Dead Petz (2015), was available for free streaming on SoundCloud. The album was written and produced primarily by Cyrus, and has been called experimental and psychedelic, with elements of psychedelic pop, psychedelic rock, and alternative pop.

=== 2016–2017: The Voice and Younger Now ===
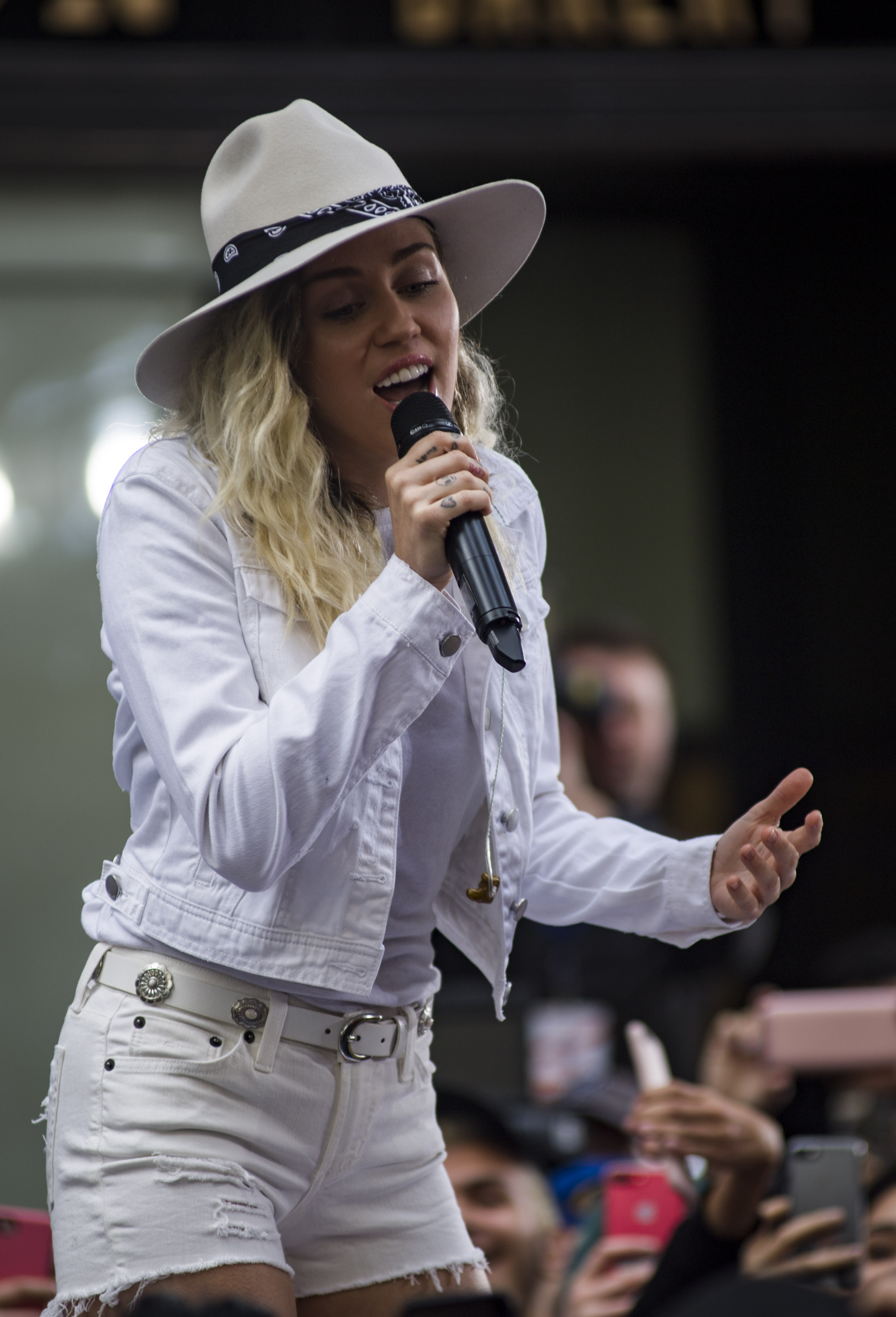
Cyrus performing on The Today Show in 2017

In 2015, following the release of her fifth studio album, Cyrus resumed working on her sixth studio effort. She was a key advisor during the tenth season of the reality singing competition The Voice. In March 2016, Cyrus had signed on as a coach for the eleventh season of The Voice as a replacement for Gwen Stefani; Cyrus became the youngest coach to appear in any incarnation of the series. In September 2016, Cyrus co-starred in Crisis in Six Scenes, a television series Woody Allen created for Amazon Studios. She played a radical activist who causes chaos in a conservative 1960s household while hiding from the police. On September 17, 2016, she appeared on The Tonight Show Starring Jimmy Fallon and covered Bob Dylan's "Baby, I'm In the Mood for You". Cyrus also had an uncredited voice cameo as Mainframe in the superhero film Guardians of the Galaxy Vol. 2, released in May 2017.

On May 11, 2017, Cyrus released "Malibu" as the lead single from her sixth album. The single debuted at No. 64 on the Billboard Hot 100 and peaked at No. 10 on the chart on its second week. On June 9, Cyrus released "Inspired" after performing the song at the One Love Manchester benefit concert. It served as a promotional single from the album. On August 8, Cyrus announced that her sixth studio album would be titled Younger Now and would be released on September 29, 2017. The album's title track was released as the second single from the album on August 18 and debuted and peaked at No. 79 on the Billboard Hot 100. On August 27, Cyrus performed the track at the 2017 MTV Video Music Awards. On September 15, she performed "Malibu", "Younger Now", "See You Again", "Party in the U.S.A." and a cover of the Roberta Flack hit "The First Time Ever I Saw Your Face" (written by Ewan McColl) for the BBC Radio 1 Live Lounge. On October 2, as part of her one-week regular musical appearances on The Tonight Show Starring Jimmy Fallon, Cyrus sang her 2009 hit single "The Climb" for the first time since 2011 alongside a cover of "No Freedom" by Dido to honor the victims of the Las Vegas shooting. The former song has since been performed at multiple charity events, protests, and marches, including at the March For Our Lives demonstrations in Washington, D.C. That same year, Cyrus returned as a coach in the thirteenth season of The Voice after taking a one-season hiatus. On October 5, 2017, Cyrus confirmed that she would not be returning to The Voice for season fourteen. On October 30, 2017, Cyrus revealed she would not release any further singles from Younger Now, nor would she tour for it.

=== 2018–2019: She Is Coming and Black Mirror ===
Before the release of Younger Now in September 2017, Cyrus expressed she was "already two songs deep on the next [album]". Producers attached to her seventh studio album included previous collaborator Mike Will Made It and new collaborators Mark Ronson and Andrew Wyatt. Her first collaboration with Ronson, "Nothing Breaks Like a Heart" from his 2019 album Late Night Feelings, was released on November 29, 2018, to great commercial reception, especially in Europe, where it peaked at number two on the UK Singles Chart as well as in Ireland and topped the charts in several Eastern European countries including Hungary or Croatia.

During the first quarter of 2019, Cyrus became quite notable for her cover songs. Having already taken part in MusiCares Person of the Year in 2018 celebrating Fleetwood Mac, she returned the year after to honor the career of her godmother Dolly Parton by performing "Islands in the Stream" alongside Canadian singer-songwriter Shawn Mendes, with whom she also performed "In My Blood" a couple days later at the 61st Grammy Awards. Cyrus's other covers include her version of Ariana Grande's "No Tears Left to Cry" for BBC Radio's Live Lounge, her participation at the Chris Cornell tribute concert I Am The Highway, where she sang "As Hope & Promise Fade" as well as her cover record of Elton John's "Don't Let The Sun Go Down On Me", included in the tribute album Revamp: Reimagining the Songs of Elton John & Bernie Taupin. Cyrus also honored John at the I'm Still Standing: A Grammy Salute to Elton John tribute concert in 2018, where she covered "The Bitch Is Back".

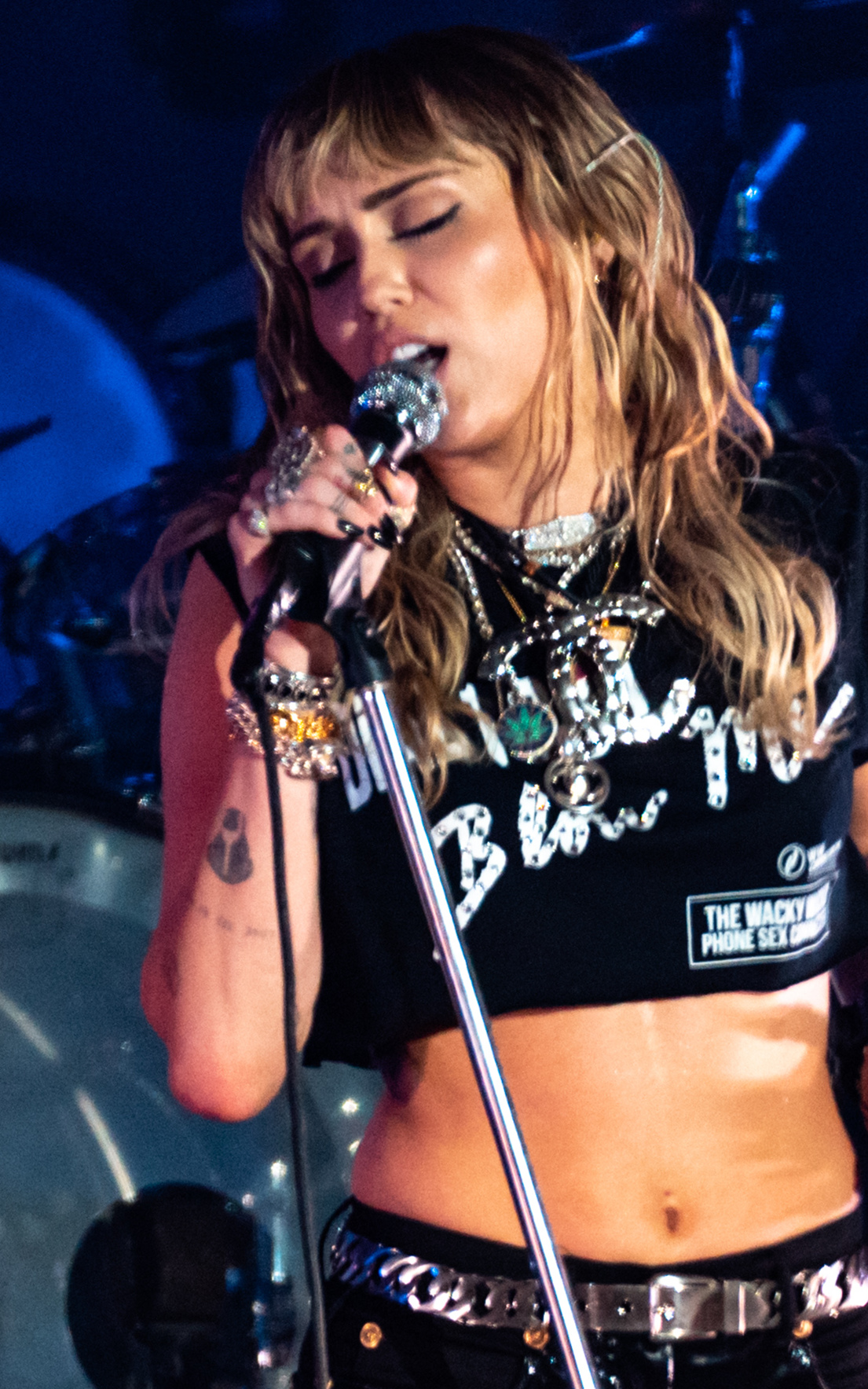
Cyrus performing She Is Coming at Primavera Sound

On May 31, 2019, Cyrus tweeted that her seventh studio album would be titled She Is Miley Cyrus and would comprise three six-song EPs, which would be released before the full-length album: She Is Coming on May 31, She Is Here in the summer, and She Is Everything in the fall. She Is Coming, which also included vocal collaborations with RuPaul, Swae Lee, Mike Will Made It and Ghostface Killah, debuted at number five on the US Billboard 200 with 36,000 album-equivalent units, while the lead single "Mother's Daughter" entered at number 54 on the US Billboard Hot 100. The Wuki remix of "Mother's Daughter" received a nomination for Best Remixed Recording at the 62nd Annual Grammy Awards while the original music video won two MTV Video Music Awards. Cyrus promoted the EP with a summer European tour that visited A-list festivals like Glastonbury and Primavera Sound.

Cyrus starred in "Rachel, Jack and Ashley Too", an episode of the Netflix sci-fi series Black Mirror, which was filmed in South Africa in November 2018. It was released on Netflix on June 5, 2019. In the episode, she played fictional pop star Ashley O and voiced her AI doll extension, Ashley Too. The plot was compared to Britney Spears's conservatorship and the Free Britney movement, which Cyrus has been an advocate for. The music video for the song "On a Roll" from the episode was released on June 13; the song itself and the B-side "Right Where I Belong" were released to digital platforms the next day.

On June 27, it was revealed that Cyrus had collaborated with Ariana Grande and Lana Del Rey on "Don't Call Me Angel", the lead single of the soundtrack to the 2019 film Charlie's Angels. It was released on September 13, 2019. In August 2019, Cyrus released "Slide Away", her first song since announcing her separation from then-husband Hemsworth. The song hinted at their breakup and contained lyrics such as "Move on, we're not 17, I'm not who I used to be". A music video was released in September 2019 that contained further references, including a ten of hearts playing card at the bottom of a pool to represent the end of her decade-long relationship with Hemsworth.

=== 2020–2022: Plastic Hearts and television projects ===
On August 14, 2020, Cyrus released the lead single from her seventh studio album, "Midnight Sky" and confirmed the cancellation of the EPs She Is Here and She Is Everything due to major recent changes in her life that did not fit the essence of the project, including her divorce from Hemsworth, and the burning of the couple's house during the Woolsey Fire in California. "Midnight Sky" became her highest-charting solo single since "Malibu" in 2017, peaking at number 14 on the US Billboard Hot 100. Internationally, in the United Kingdom the song has thus far peaked at number five on the UK Singles Chart. The track was later mashed up with Stevie Nicks' "Edge of Seventeen".

In October, Cyrus had a third Backyard Session on MTV and announced via Instagram that her seventh studio album Plastic Hearts would be released on November 27, 2020. It was previously intended to be called She Is Miley Cyrus, completing the EP series once finalized. The album was released to positive reviews from critics and performed well, debuting at number two on the Billboard 200, with 60,000 units, becoming her twelfth top ten entry on the chart. With that entry, Cyrus broke the record for attaining the most US Billboard 200 top-five albums in the 21st century by a female music artist. Plastic Hearts marked a step of Cyrus into rock and glam rock music and spawned two other singles: "Prisoner" featuring English singer Dua Lipa and "Angels like You", which peaked at 8 and 66 respectively in the United Kingdom. The album also included vocal collaborations with Billy Idol and Joan Jett. Due to popular demand and social media virality, Cyrus included the live covers of Blondie's "Heart of Glass" and The Cranberries' "Zombie".

Cyrus won a 2020 Webby Special Achievement Award. In February 2021, Cyrus performed at the first TikTok Tailgate show in Tampa, for 7,500 vaccinated healthcare workers. It served as a pre-show before Super Bowl LV. It aired on TikTok and CBS. The performance was featured in the music video for "Angels like You". In March 2021, Cyrus departed RCA and signed with Columbia Records, a sister label of RCA under the Sony Music umbrella. That same month Cyrus embraced her days as Hannah Montana and wrote an open letter to the character on social media for the show's 15th anniversary, despite all statements that her days as Montana gave Cyrus an identity crisis. Rumors about a possible revival of the show have been around ever since. On April 23, 2021, The Kid Laroi released a remix of his single "Without You" featuring Cyrus, her first release under Columbia Records. On April 3, 2021, Cyrus performed at the NCAA March Madness Final Four in Indianapolis with the frontline health care workers in the audience.

In May 2021, Cyrus signed an overall deal with NBCUniversal, including a first-look deal with her studio Hopetown Entertainment, as part of which she would develop projects for the company's outlets and star in three specials; with the first project off the deal being the Stand By You Pride concert special, which was released the following month on Peacock. In June, Cyrus released a studio cover version of Metallica's "Nothing Else Matters", which was included in The Metallica Blacklist, a tribute album to the band's homonymous record, featuring renditions recorded by various artists and released in conjunction to the original album's 30th anniversary. The track also features Elton John on the piano, Yo-Yo Ma and Red Hot Chili Peppers' Chad Smith. The singer initially teased a Metallica cover album in October 2020 and had already performed the track live during her set at Glastonbury.

To promote Plastic Hearts, Cyrus teased a concert tour around the album's release. The tour was postponed due to the pandemic but Cyrus was able to headline several music festivals in the country during summer 2021, including Austin City Limits, Lollapalooza, and Music Midtown. Later that year, she revealed she would tour South America for the first time in seven years in early 2022. The second special off her deal with NBCUniversal was Miley's New Year's Eve Party, which Cyrus co-hosted from Miami with Saturday Night Live cast member Pete Davidson and also co-executive produced under her production company Hopetown Entertainment, featuring performances by Cyrus, 24kGoldn, Anitta, Billie Joe Armstrong, Brandi Carlile, Jack Harlow, Kitty Cash, and Saweetie.

In February 2022, Cyrus embarked on her music festival concert tour, Attention Tour, in support of Plastic Hearts, which took place in North, South, and Central America. This marked her first tour to South America since her Gypsy Heart Tour in 2011. The tour concluded on March 26, 2022. On April 1, 2022, Cyrus released her third live album, Attention: Miley Live. Most of the album was recorded during her concert as part of the Super Bowl Music Fest at the Crypto.com Arena in Los Angeles on February 12, 2022, with the set list including songs from her albums Plastic Hearts, Miley Cyrus & Her Dead Petz, Bangerz, The Time of Our Lives, Breakout, and Meet Miley Cyrus, along with multiple cover songs. The album also includes two unreleased tracks—"Attention" and "You". She said the album was "curated by the fans for the fans". Emily Swingle of Clash gave acclaim to Cyrus's versatile vocals, saying her "voice is truly a force to be reckoned with, seamlessly fitting whatever genre she chooses to tackle. From the playful, country-hip-hop banger that is '4x4', to rap-heavy '23', to the bluesy, rich cover of Janis Joplin's 'Maybe', it seems like Cyrus can fit into just about any genre she gets her paws on." By the end of that month, Cyrus released the deluxe version of the album, which includes six additional songs including a mashup of "Mother's Daughter" and "Boys Don't Cry" featuring Anitta, that are mostly part of her time at the Lollapalooza festival in Brazil and other shows in Latin America; she commented on the addition of her single "Angels Like You" at her concert in Colombia in gratitude due to the song reaching the number one spot on iTunes in that country and because her fans sang the song all night outside the hotel where she was staying in Bogotá. The following month, NBC announced that Miley's New Year's Eve Party had been renewed for a second iteration set to be aired on New Year's Eve 2022–23. In August 2022, it was announced that Cyrus was set to star in a Christmas television film Dolly Parton's Mountain Magic Christmas, produced by Dolly Parton for NBC.

=== 2023–2025: Endless Summer Vacation, Something Beautiful, and other projects ===
In late 2022, Cyrus and her longtime collaborator Mike Will Made It teased new music to be released in 2023. Days later, during the second edition of Miley's New Year's Eve Party, the singer's next lead single, "Flowers", was announced. It was released on January 13, 2023, and debuted at number one on the Billboard Hot 100, Global 200, and Global Excl. US charts. With thirteen weeks each atop the Global 200 and Global Excl. US charts, it became the longest-running leader on the former chart, at the time. Topping the Hot 100 for eight non-consecutive weeks, it was Cyrus's second US number-one single—her first in a decade, since "Wrecking Ball" (2013)—and her longest-running chart-topper. "Flowers" became a global success, reaching number one in 37 countries, including Australia, Canada, France, Germany, and the UK. It was 2023's most-streamed and most-downloaded song across various platforms in numerous countries, and the most-consumed song on US radio. On Spotify, the single became the fastest track to surpass 100 million and 1 billion plays (7 and 112 days), at the time. Due to 57 weeks atop the Billboard Adult Contemporary chart, it became the longest-running number one song on any Billboard airplay chart in history. It also earned the most cumulative weeks atop all Billboard airplay charts (106 weeks). "Flowers" topped the year-end charts in various regions, and ranked as the second best-performing song of the year on the year-end Hot 100 chart of 2023. According to the International Federation of the Phonographic Industry (IFPI), it was the best-selling song in 2023 globally. A demo version of the track was made available in March 2023. "Flowers" was certified seven-times platinum by the RIAA in March 2025.

Cyrus's eighth studio album, Endless Summer Vacation, was released on March 10, 2023. Her first studio effort with Columbia Records, she described the record as "[her] love letter to LA", which reflects upon physical and mental growth she experienced during production. Cyrus decided to primarily focus on songcraft, before handling production, on the album—a pop and dance-pop record. It debuted at number three on the US Billboard 200, earning 119,000 album-equivalent units. "River", the second single off the record, was released on March 13, 2023, and reached number 32 on the US Hot 100. "Jaded", which peaked at number 56, became the third single in April 2023. Endless Summer Vacation was the 19th best-selling album globally in 2023, according to the IFPI.

A documentary concert special—as part of Cyrus's Backyard Sessions series—titled Endless Summer Vacation (Backyard Sessions), premiered on Disney+ on March 10, accompanying the album's release. Executive produced by Cyrus, it features her performing songs from the album, and her 2009 single "The Climb", with an appearance by Rufus Wainwright. In June, she voiced Van, a nihilistic female creature, in the second season of the Netflix adult animated sitcom Human Resources. An updated version of Cyrus's Disney+ special, titled Endless Summer Vacation: Continued (Backyard Sessions), premiered on ABC on August 24, 2023. The day after, Cyrus released the single "Used to Be Young", which was included in the digital reissue of Endless Summer Vacation and debuted at number eight in the US. On October 20, Dolly Parton released a rock re-recording of Cyrus's "Wrecking Ball" featuring her as a guest vocalist, as the final single off her studio album Rockstar (2023). Billboard ranked Cyrus as the ninth-best-selling musician of 2023.

At the 66th Annual Grammy Awards, Cyrus received six nominations, including Album of the Year and Best Pop Vocal Album for Endless Summer Vacation, and won Record of the Year and Best Pop Solo Performance for "Flowers"—her first set of wins. She also performed "Flowers" at the ceremony. The track won International Song of the Year at the 2024 Brit Awards, marking Cyrus's first win. She appeared in a cameo role as Tiffany Plastercaster—inspired by Cynthia Plaster Caster—in the Ethan Coen-directed comedy road film Drive-Away Dolls, released in February 2024. Cyrus then featured on "Doctor (Work It Out)" by Pharrell Williams, an outtake from her fourth album Bangerz (2013). Leaked online in 2017, the track was reworked and re-recorded before being released on March 1, 2024. Cyrus was then featured on the duet "II Most Wanted" from Beyoncé's album Cowboy Carter. It was released as the album's third single in April 2024, and reached the top ten in the US, the UK, and on the Global 200. "II Most Wanted" won Best Country Duo/Group Performance at the 67th Annual Grammy Awards, marking Cyrus's third career-win. In May 2024, as one of 16 acts featured on the Talking Heads tribute album Everyone's Getting Involved: A Tribute to Talking Heads' Stop Making Sense, Cyrus provided a synth-driven dance-pop rendition of the band's "Psycho Killer". She co-wrote and recorded "Beautiful That Way" for the soundtrack album to the Gia Coppola-directed The Last Showgirl, released as a promotional single on December 9. It won Best Original Song in an Independent Film at the 15th Hollywood Music in Media Awards, and was nominated for Best Original Song at the 82nd Golden Globe Awards and Best Song at the 30th Critics' Choice Awards. In February 2025, Cyrus performed "Flowers", and covers of "Crazy Little Thing Called Love" and "Nothing Compares 2 U" with Brittany Howard, on SNL50: The Homecoming Concert and Saturday Night Live 50th Anniversary Special.

Her ninth studio album, Something Beautiful, was released on May 30, 2025. Cyrus described it as "hypnotic" and "an attempt to medicate somewhat of a sick culture through music". The album is a progressive pop record centered around themes of "healing". It was preceded by the lead single "End of the World" on April 3; as well as four promotional singles: "Prelude" and the title track in March, and "More to Lose" and "Walk of Fame" (featuring Brittany Howard) in May. Something Beautiful received generally positive reviews from music critics, with many considering it one of Cyrus's most ambitious and introspective records to date. Rolling Stone's Rob Sheffield described the album as "Cyrus aiming higher than ever" while Nick Levine of NME called it "a fully realized artistic statement". The album debuted at number four on the Billboard 200 with 44,000 units, marking Cyrus's 11th top-five and 15th top-ten album. Elsewhere, it reached number three in the UK and number four in Australia. A musical film of the same name, written and directed by Cyrus, Jacob Bixenman, and Brendan Walter premiered on June 6, 2025, during the Tribeca Festival and was theatrically released—for one night only—on June 12 in North America, and on June 27 internationally, as a visual companion to the record. Billboard called the visual album a "one of a kind pop opera"; it was released to Disney+ and Hulu in July. Later that month, Billions Club Live with Miley Cyrus: A Concert Film, documenting her June 2025 Paris concert for Spotify, was released on the platform. The deluxe edition of Something Beautiful was released on September 19, 2025. In December 2025, Cyrus released "Dream as One" for the soundtrack to Avatar: Fire and Ash; it was nominated for Best Original Song at the 83rd Golden Globes.

=== 2026: Hannah Montana 20th anniversary and Bass Persuades ===
Cyrus executive produced and appeared in the Hannah Montana 20th Anniversary Special, which was released on March 24, 2026, on Disney+. On the special, she performed a new Hannah Montana song, "Younger You", which was released three days later. A duet version of the song with Cyrus and Lainey Wilson was released on April 17, 2026. In July 2026, it was announced Cyrus had transferred to Atlantic Records. That same month, she previewed the potential release of new music to Wonderland. In August 2026, Cyrus relaunched her official website, teasing the release of new music. The relaunch sparked discussions about her potentially dropping her surname from her music career or if the project would be titled Miley. Cyrus' tenth studio album, Bass Persuades, was released on September 18, 2026. To celebrate the album's release, she performed two one-off concerts at the Hollywood Bowl on October 16 and 18, 2026.

On October 23, 2026, Cyrus is set to release two songs for the soundtrack of the third season of Nobody Wants This, entitled "Cold-Blooded" and "You (Demo)".

== Artistry ==
=== Influences and musical style ===
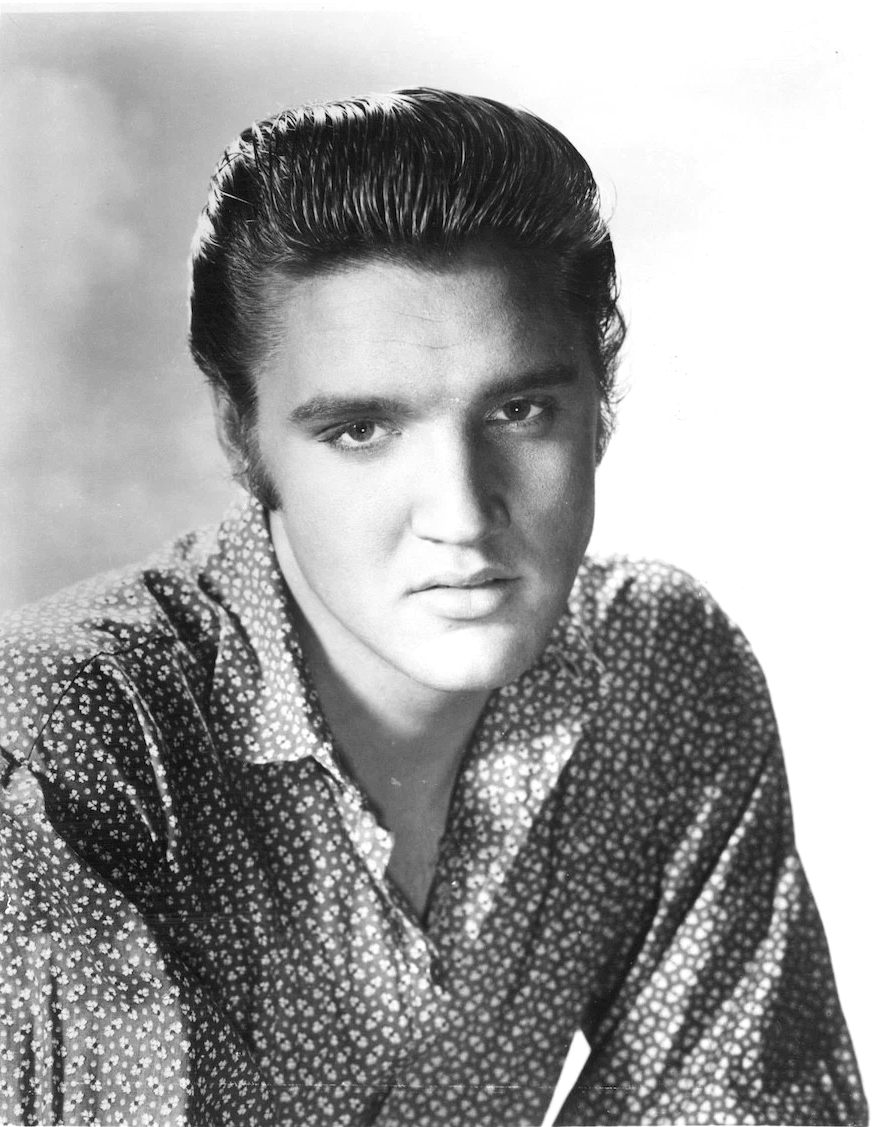
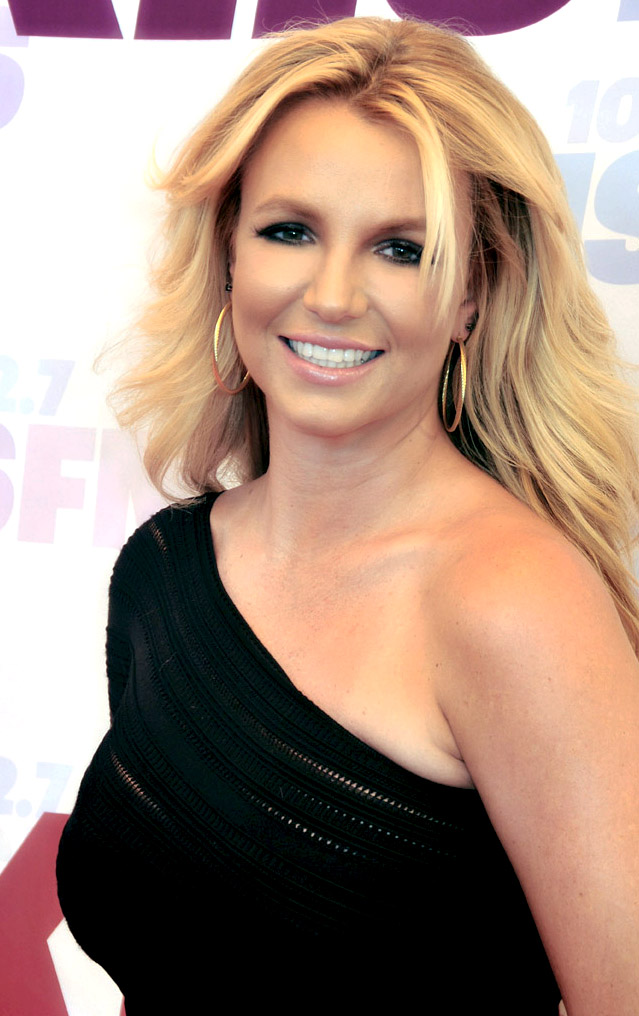
Cyrus credits singers Elvis Presley (left) and Britney Spears (right) as influences.

Cyrus has mainly been described as a pop singer, although her later work has earned her the title of a "millennial ambassador" for rock music. Her music has also incorporated elements of many other different genres including country, hip-hop, indie, and psychedelic. Cyrus has cited Elvis Presley as her biggest inspiration. She has also cited artists such as Madonna, Lana Del Rey, Dolly Parton, Timbaland, Whitney Houston, Christina Aguilera, Joan Jett, Lil Kim, Shania Twain, Hanson, OneRepublic, and Britney Spears as influences. Since the beginning of her music career, Cyrus has been described as being predominantly a pop artist. Her Hannah Montana 2: Meet Miley Cyrus debut studio effort was characterized as sounding similar to her releases as "Hannah Montana" featuring a pop-rock and bubblegum pop sound. Cyrus hoped that the release of Breakout (2008) would help distance her from this sound; the record featured Cyrus experimenting with various genres. Cyrus co-wrote eight songs for the album and was quoted as saying: "I just hope this record showcases that, more than anything, I'm a [song]writer." The songs on her early releases feature lyrics on the topics of love and relationships.

Cyrus possesses a mezzo-soprano vocal range, although her vocals were once described as alto with a "Nashville twang" in both her spoken and singing voice. Her voice has a distinctive raspy sound to it, similar in vein to that of Pink and Amy Winehouse. On "Party in the U.S.A." (2009), her vocals feature belter refrains, while those on the song "Obsessed" (2009) are described as "husky". Releases such as "The Climb" (2009) and "These Four Walls" (2008) feature elements of country music and showcase Cyrus's "twangy vocals". Cyrus experimented with an electropop sound on "Fly on the Wall" (2008), a genre that she would explore further with the release of Can't Be Tamed (2010), her third studio album. It was initially intended to feature rock elements prior to its completion, and Cyrus claimed after its release that it could be her final pop album. The album's songs speak of Cyrus's desire to achieve freedom in both her personal and professional life. She began working on Bangerz (2013) during a musical hiatus, and described the record as having a "dirty south feel" prior to its release. Critics noted the use of hip-hop and synthpop on the album. The album's songs are placed in chronological order telling the story of her failed relationship with Liam Hemsworth. Cyrus described Miley Cyrus & Her Dead Petz (2015) as "a little psychedelic, but still in that pop world". For her rock-influenced album, Plastic Hearts, Cyrus cited Britney Spears and Metallica as major influences. Inspired by pop and dance-pop, Endless Summer Vacation (2023) "feels like a recap of her career's 15-plus years, with Cyrus breezing through genres with the ease of a well-seasoned tourist". Cyrus related its overall concept to her affection for Los Angeles.

=== Live performances ===
Cyrus's live performances have been noted for combining theatrical pop staging with a vocal style influenced by rock and country music. Reviewing a 2010 performance at the House of Blues, Ann Powers of the Los Angeles Times described Cyrus as a capable rock singer with considerable vocal power and a rough quality to her voice, and noted that the concert included covers of songs associated with Joan Jett, including "I Love Rock 'n' Roll", "Cherry Bomb" and "Bad Reputation". During the Bangerz Tour in 2014, Alexis Petridis of The Guardian contrasted the production's elaborate visual spectacle with an acoustic portion of the show, writing that performances of Bob Dylan's "You're Gonna Make Me Lonesome When You Go" and Dolly Parton's "Jolene" highlighted the earthier qualities of Cyrus's voice and her background as a Nashville performer. A 2015 Los Angeles Times review of the Milky Milky Milk Tour similarly credited Cyrus's live performances with adding force and emotional intensity to material from Miley Cyrus & Her Dead Petz, particularly its ballads.

Cover songs have become a recurring feature of Cyrus's live repertoire. Her 2012 Backyard Sessions included versions of "Lilac Wine", "Look What They've Done to My Song Ma" and Parton's "Jolene"; the latter continued to appear in her subsequent concert sets. Reviewing her first live album, Attention: Miley Live (2022), Dani Blum of Pitchfork attributed Cyrus's effectiveness as a cover performer to the strength and texture of her voice; seven of the album's twenty original-edition tracks contained complete or partial covers, including "Jolene", "Nothing Compares 2 U" and "Bang Bang (My Baby Shot Me Down)".

==== Pre-2023 ====
Cyrus's performances have also attracted controversy and extensive media attention. Her performance of "Party in the U.S.A." at the 2009 Teen Choice Awards prompted criticism over her outfit and the use of a pole as part of the choreography. She faced similar controversy after performing "Can't Be Tamed" on Britain's Got Talent in 2010, during which she simulated a kiss with a female backup dancer. Cyrus defended the performance and rejected the resulting criticism.

Cyrus received widespread media and public scrutiny following her performance of "We Can't Stop" and "Blurred Lines" with Robin Thicke at the 2013 MTV Video Music Awards. Wearing a flesh-colored latex outfit, Cyrus used an oversized foam finger as a prop and twerked against Thicke during the performance. The performance generated extensive media coverage; contemporary reviews characterized it as both a "bad acid trip" and a "trainwreck". The provocative imagery continued on the Bangerz Tour, where Cyrus entered the stage by sliding down a large tongue-shaped slide and incorporated elaborate costumes, props and sexually suggestive staging.

Alongside the attention surrounding her stage image, Cyrus increasingly incorporated rock standards and reinterpretations into her live performances. In January 2019, she performed Temple of the Dog's "Say Hello 2 Heaven" at I Am the Highway, a tribute concert for Chris Cornell at The Forum in Los Angeles. Mikael Wood of the Los Angeles Times wrote that Cyrus's performance demonstrated her suitability for the tribute, highlighting the raspy and blues-influenced qualities of her vocals.

At the 2019 Glastonbury Festival, Cyrus performed a set that combined her own material with covers of Amy Winehouse's "Back to Black", Led Zeppelin's "Black Dog", Metallica's "Nothing Else Matters", Parton's "Jolene" and Nine Inch Nails' "Head Like a Hole". She also brought Billy Ray Cyrus and Lil Nas X onstage for "Old Town Road". NME described the appearance as a rock-oriented reinvention of Cyrus's stage persona and praised her vocals and stage presence, identifying the "Old Town Road" collaboration as a notable moment of the festival.

Cyrus's cover performances received renewed attention in 2020. Her version of Blondie's "Heart of Glass" at the iHeartRadio Music Festival circulated widely online and was subsequently released to streaming services. For MTV Unplugged Presents Miley Cyrus Backyard Sessions, she performed songs by artists including Britney Spears, The Cardigans, Pearl Jam, The Velvet Underground and Jackson Browne. Rolling Stone observed that her series of televised and streamed covers had drawn significant online attention and praised her ability to reinterpret songs from different genres. At the Save Our Stages festival that October, she performed The Cranberries' "Zombie" and The Cure's "Boys Don't Cry".

In February 2021, Cyrus headlined the Super Bowl LV TikTok Tailgate, a pregame concert held for invited healthcare workers. The performance featured guest appearances by Joan Jett and Billy Idol and combined Cyrus's songs with covers including "Heart of Glass", "Bad Reputation", "White Wedding", "Head Like a Hole", "Rebel Girl" and "Jolene". The prevalence of covers and rearranged versions of her own songs was subsequently documented on Attention: Miley Live, her first non-Hannah Montana live album.

==== 2023–present ====
In March 2023, Cyrus released Endless Summer Vacation (Backyard Sessions), a Disney+ concert special in which she performed eight songs from Endless Summer Vacation, including "Flowers", "River" and "Jaded", as well as "The Climb" from her earlier career. An expanded version aired on ABC in August 2023 in conjunction with the release of "Used to Be Young".

Cyrus marked her 31st birthday in November 2023 with a private performance at the Chateau Marmont in Los Angeles. The show included the first live performance of "Flowers", a cover of Journey's "Faithfully", "Used to Be Young" and "Jingle Bells". At the 66th Annual Grammy Awards in February 2024, she gave the first televised performance of "Flowers". During the performance, Cyrus altered the lyrics to acknowledge having won her first Grammy Award earlier in the ceremony. Rolling Stone described the performance as a showcase for her gravelly vocals and noted its visual and vocal references to Tina Turner.

In July 2024, Cyrus co-hosted the Gucci Summer Celebration at Chateau Marmont and performed a slowed-down, jazz-influenced arrangement of "Flowers" during the private event.

During the promotion of Something Beautiful in 2025, Cyrus favored a series of smaller-scale appearances rather than a conventional tour. In May, she held an intimate TikTok listening event at Chateau Marmont for approximately 100 attendees, performing new songs including "End of the World", "Easy Lover" and "More to Lose", as well as "The Climb", which she had not performed publicly for several years. Cyrus also performed "More to Lose" on Jimmy Kimmel Live! on May 22, marking the song's live television debut with a stripped-down arrangement.

On May 30, Cyrus made an unannounced appearance at an album-release event at 3 Dollar Bill in Brooklyn, where she performed "Easy Lover". On June 2, she performed "More to Lose", "Easy Lover" and "Flowers" during another surprise appearance at Bemelmans Bar inside The Carlyle Hotel in New York City. Paper described the performance and Cyrus's other small-venue appearances of the period as a shift toward more intimate live settings. On June 4, Cyrus held an album signing at Rough Trade in New York and surprised attendees with a live performance. She appeared on The Tonight Show Starring Jimmy Fallon later that day, and an interview with Cyrus on the Every Single Album podcast was released the following day.

== Public image ==
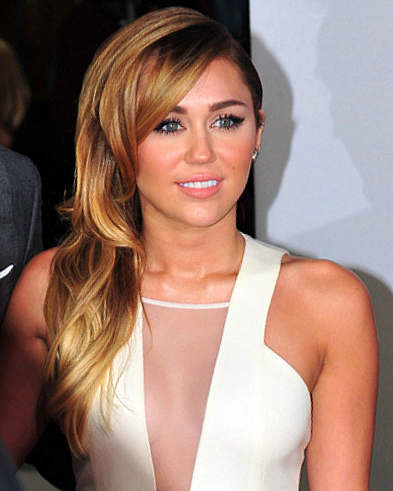
Cyrus at the 2012 People's Choice Awards

In the early years of her career, Cyrus had a generally wholesome image as a teen idol. Her fame increased dramatically in the wake of the Vanity Fair photo scandal in 2008, and it was reported that photographs of Cyrus could be sold to photo agencies for up to $2,000 per photo. In subsequent years, her image continued to shift dramatically from her teen idol status. In 2008, Donny Osmond wrote of Cyrus's imminent transition to adulthood: "Miley will have to face adulthood... As she does, she'll want to change her image, and that change will be met with adversity." The release of her 2010 album Can't Be Tamed saw Cyrus officially attempting to distance herself from her teenage persona by releasing controversial music videos for her songs "Can't Be Tamed" and "Who Owns My Heart". Her behavior throughout 2013 and 2014 sparked a substantial amount of controversy, although her godmother Dolly Parton said "...the girl can write. The girl can sing. The girl is smart. And she doesn't have to be so drastic. But I will respect her choices. I did it my way, so why can't she do it her way?" Liel Leibovitz at Tablet noted in 2013: "Talking to the website Hunger, the singer argued that those adults who deem her gyrations too sultry and her music too saccharine were simply too ancient—and Jewish—to get it. 'With magazines, with movies, it's always weird when things are targeted for young people yet they're driven by people that are like 40 years too old', Cyrus opined. And one group stands out in [her] mind as deserving of most of the blame: 'It can't be like this 70-year-old Jewish man that doesn't leave his desk all day, telling me what the clubs want to hear.'"

Cyrus was ranked number 17 on Forbes's list of the most powerful celebrities in 2014; the magazine notes that "The last time she made our list was when she was still rolling in Hannah Montana money. Now the pop singer is all grown up and courting controversy at every turn." In August 2014, her life was documented in a comic book titled Fame: Miley Cyrus; it begins with her controversial 2013 MTV Video Music Awards performance and covers her Disney fame as well as exploring her childhood in Tennessee. The comic book was written by Michael L. Frizell, drawn by Juan Luis Rincón, and is available in both print and digital formats. In September 2010, Cyrus placed tenth on Billboard's first-ever edition of its 21 Under 21 listicle; she was ranked twenty-first in 2011 and eighteenth in 2012. In 2013, Maxim listed Cyrus as number one on their annual Hot 100 list. Cyrus was chosen by Time magazine as one of the finalists for Person of the Year in November 2013; she came in third place with 16.3% of the staff vote. In March 2014, Skidmore College in New York began to offer a special topics sociology course entitled "The Sociology of Miley Cyrus: Race, Class, Gender and Media" which was "using Miley as a lens through which to explore sociological thinking about identity, entertainment, media and fame". In 2015, Cyrus was listed as one of the nine runners-up for The Advocate's Person of the Year. In March 2024, to commemorate the 65th anniversary of International Women's Day, Cyrus was one of a number of celebrities who had their likeness turned into Bratz doll.

== Personal life ==
Cyrus resides in Hidden Hills, California, and also owns a $5.8 million home in her hometown of Franklin. She was raised as a Christian and identified herself as such during her childhood and early adult life, but she included references to Tibetan Buddhism in her 2015 song "Milky Milky Milk" and is also influenced by Hindu beliefs.

Since 2019, she has been a vocally childfree person.

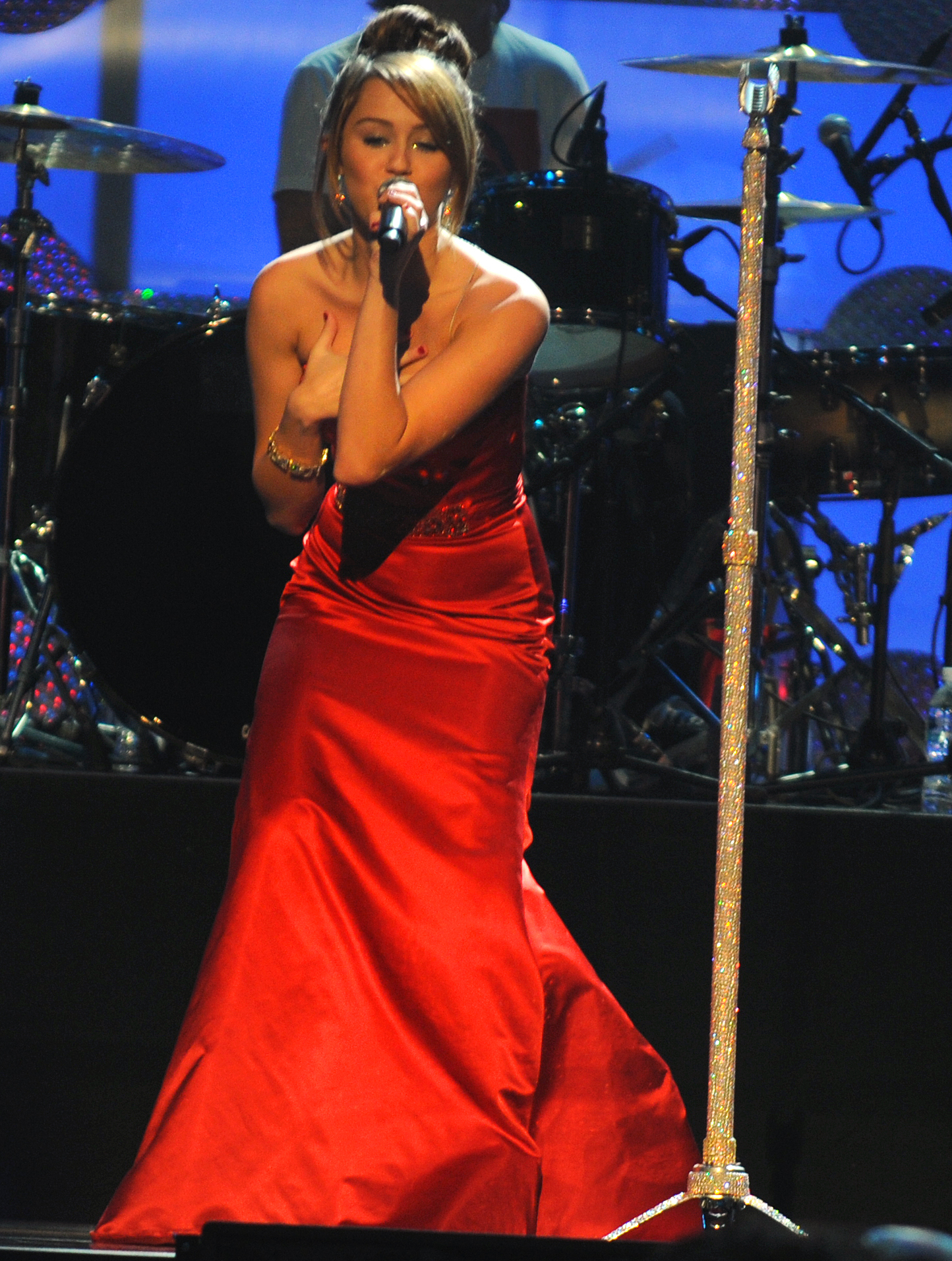
Cyrus performing at the Verizon Center in Washington, D.C. on January 19, 2009

=== Sexuality and gender ===
Cyrus came out to her mother at age 14 and has said: "I never want to label myself! I am ready to love anyone that loves me for who I am! I am open." In June 2015, Time magazine reported that she identified as gender fluid. She said she "doesn't relate to being boy or girl, and I don't have to have my partner relate to boy or girl", adding that she is "literally open to every single thing that is consenting and doesn't involve an animal and everyone is of age".

Cyrus is a supporter of the LGBTQ community. Her 2010 song "My Heart Beats for Love" was written for one of her gay friends, and she has since said London is her favorite place to perform due to its extensive gay scene. Cyrus has an equals sign tattooed on her ring finger in support of same-sex marriage. After her 2018 marriage to Liam Hemsworth, Cyrus went on record to say she still identified as queer. In 2014, she founded the Happy Hippie Foundation, which works to "fight injustice facing homeless youth, LGBTQ youth and other vulnerable populations".

=== Veganism ===
Cyrus became a vegan and stopped eating animal products in 2014. In 2020, she said on The Joe Rogan Experience that she had to switch to a pescatarian diet after suffering from omega-3 deficiency: "I've been a vegan for a very long time and I had to introduce fish and omegas into my life because my brain wasn't functioning properly." Cyrus said she cried when eating her first fish after her vegan diet, saying "I cried for the fish ... it really hurts me to eat fish."

=== Cannabis use ===
Cyrus has been open about her recreational use of cannabis. She told Rolling Stone in 2013 that it was "the best drug on earth" and called it, along with MDMA, a "happy drug". While accepting the Best Video Award at the 2013 MTV Europe Music Awards, Cyrus appeared to smoke a joint onstage; this was removed from the delayed broadcast of the show in the United States. In a 2014 interview with W magazine, Cyrus said "I love weed" and "I just love getting stoned." In a 2017 interview on The Tonight Show Starring Jimmy Fallon, she said she had quit cannabis before the press tour for Younger Now so she could be "super clear" when discussing the record. In May 2018, she told Jimmy Kimmel: "I also think it's the most magical, amazing... it's my first and true love. It's just not for me right now at this time in my life, but I'm sure there will be a day I will happily indulge." During a December 2018 interview with Andy Cohen, she credited her mother for reintroducing her to cannabis. In 2019, Cyrus sent "Nothing Breaks Like a Heart" collaborator Mark Ronson a cannabis bouquet from Lowell Herb Co as a tongue-in-cheek Valentine's Day gift. She invested in the company in August.

Before and shortly after vocal cord surgery in November 2019, Cyrus said she had abstained from cannabis and alcohol.

=== Relationships ===
Cyrus has said that she dated singer-actor Nick Jonas from June 2006 to December 2007, claiming they were "in love" and began dating soon after they first met. Their relationship attracted considerable media attention. Cyrus was in a nine-month relationship with model Justin Gaston from 2008 to 2009. In 2009, while filming The Last Song, she began an on-again, off-again relationship with her co-star Liam Hemsworth. They were first engaged from May 2012 to September 2013. She has also dated actor Patrick Schwarzenegger (2014–2015) and model Stella Maxwell (2015).

Cyrus and Hemsworth rekindled their relationship in March 2016, and got engaged again that October. In November 2018, their home burned down in the Woolsey Fire in California. On December 23, Cyrus and Hemsworth married in a private ceremony at their home in Nashville. She said her marriage redefined "what it looks like for someone that's a queer person like me to be in a hetero relationship" while "still very sexually attracted to women". Cyrus said the ceremony was "kind of out of character for me" because they had "worn rings forever [and] definitely didn't need it in any way". She believed the loss of their home to be the catalyst for the wedding, saying "the timing felt right" and that "no one is promised the next day, or the next, so I try to be 'in the now' as much as possible". On August 10, 2019, Cyrus announced their separation; on August 21, Hemsworth filed for divorce, citing "irreconcilable differences". Their divorce was finalized on January 28, 2020.

After announcing her separation from Hemsworth, Cyrus dated Kaitlynn Carter from August to September 2019. In October 2019, Cyrus began dating Australian singer Cody Simpson, a longtime friend. In August 2020, Cyrus announced that she and Simpson had split up. Her announcement coincided with the release of her single "Midnight Sky", which was inspired by her breakups with Hemsworth, Carter, and Simpson. In 2021, Cyrus began dating American musician Maxx Morando, who worked as a producer on her 2023 album, Endless Summer Vacation. On December 2, 2025, it was reported that Cyrus and Morando are engaged. On November 21, 2026, Cyrus married Morando in Palm Springs, with her mom, Tish Cyrus, and sister, Noah Cyrus, attending.

== Philanthropy ==
Throughout her career Cyrus has sung on several charity singles such as: "Just Stand Up!", "Send It On", "Everybody Hurts" and "We Are the World 25 for Haiti". She is an avid supporter of the City of Hope National Medical Center in California, having attended benefit concerts in 2008, 2009 and 2012. In 2008 and 2009, during her Best of Both Worlds and Wonder World Tours, for every concert ticket sold, she donated one dollar to the organization. Cyrus celebrated her 16th birthday at Disneyland by delivering a US$1 million donation from Disney to Youth Service America. In July 2009, Cyrus performed at the Elizabeth Glaser Pediatric AIDS Foundation's 20th annual Time for Heroes celebrity picnic and donated several items including autographed merchandise, and a script from Hannah Montana for the Ronald McDonald House Auction.

Cyrus has supported charities including the Elton John AIDS Foundation, Entertainment Industry Foundation, Habitat for Humanity, United Service Organizations, Youth Service America and Music for Relief. In January 2010, Cyrus posted the final video to her mileymandy YouTube Account. In the video, Cyrus promoted support for To Write Love on Her Arms, and the next day appeared in a promotional video for the film with Joaquin Phoenix, and Liv Tyler. In February 2010, she donated several items, including the dress she wore to the 52nd Annual Grammy Awards, and two tickets to the Hollywood premiere of her film The Last Song, to raise money for the victims of the 2010 Haiti earthquake. In April 2010, Cyrus, working with the Make-A-Wish Foundation, performed for and met with 29 children at the Grove at Farmers Market in Los Angeles, California. Cyrus continued to support The Make-A-Wish Foundation, and met with at least 150 children.

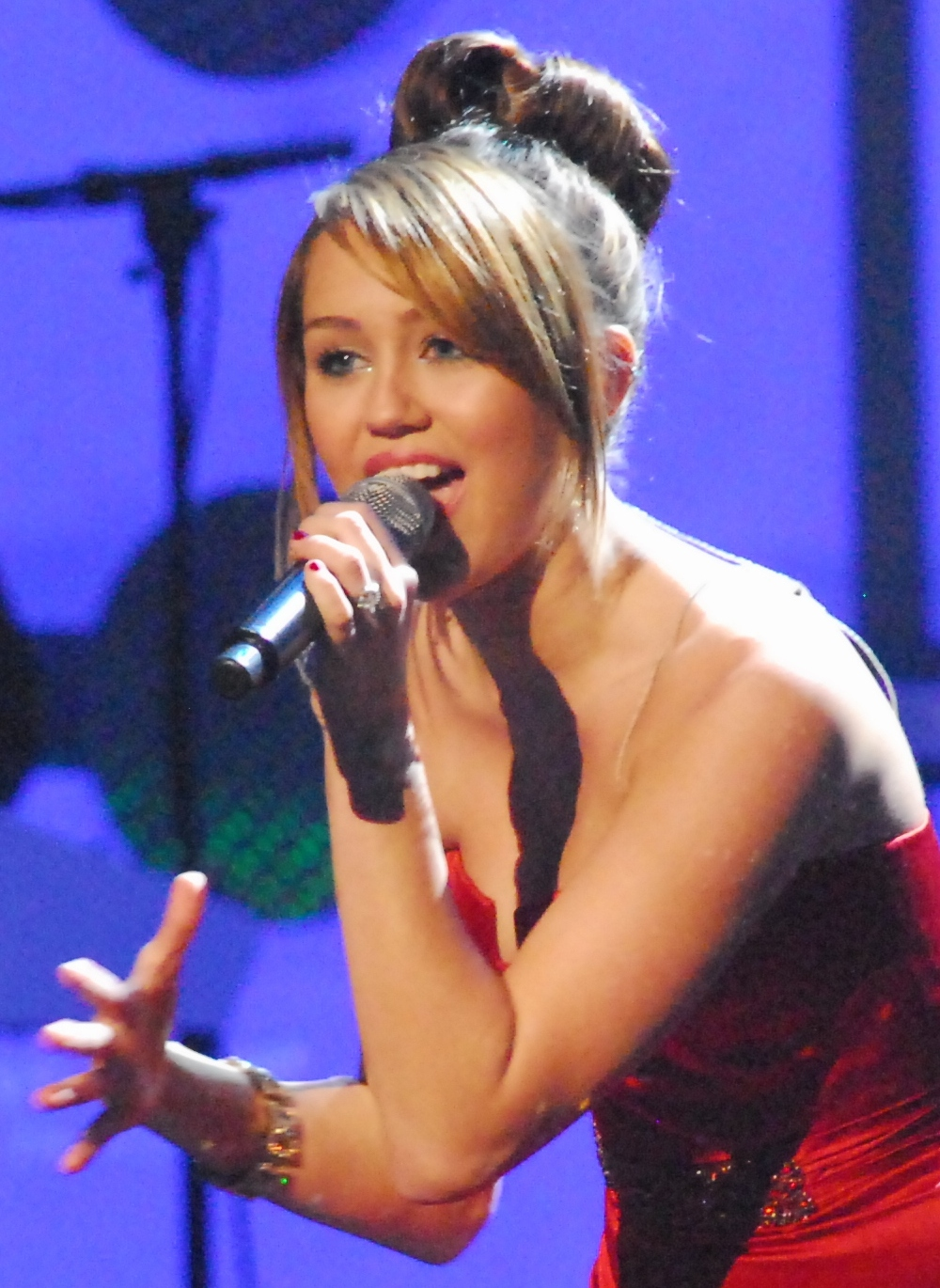
Cyrus performing at the Kids Inaugural: We Are the Future concert in 2009

In January 2011, Cyrus met an ailing fan with spina bifida with the charity Kids Wish Network. In April 2011, she appeared in a commercial for the American Red Cross asking people to pledge $10 to help those affected by the 2011 Tōhoku earthquake and tsunami. That same year, Hilary Duff presented Cyrus with the first-ever Global Action Youth Leadership Award at the first Annual Global Action Awards Gala for her support of Blessings in a Backpack, an organization that works to feed hungry children in schools, and her personal Get Ur Good On campaign with the Youth Services of America. Cyrus stated: "I want (kids) to do something they love. Not something that seems like a chore because someone tells them that's the right thing to do or what their parents want or what's important to people around them, but what's in their heart." In December 2011, she appeared in a commercial for the charity J/P Haitian Relief Organization, and teamed up with her elder brother Trace Cyrus to design a limited-edition T-shirt and hoodie for charity. All proceeds from the sale of these items went to her charity, Get Ur Good On, which supports education for under-privileged children. That month, she performed "The Climb" at the CNN Heroes: An All-Star Tribute at the Shrine Auditorium in Los Angeles.

In 2012, Cyrus released a cover version of Bob Dylan's "You're Gonna Make Me Lonesome When You Go" with Johnzo West for the charity Amnesty International as a part of the album Chimes of Freedom. She also appeared in a commercial for the Rock the Vote campaign, which encouraged young people to make their voices heard by voting in the 2012 federal election. For her 20th birthday, activists at People for the Ethical Treatment of Animals (PETA) adopted a pig called Nora in her name. Cyrus also supports 39 well-known charities, including Make-a-Wish Foundation, Cystic Fibrosis Foundation, St. Jude's Children's Research Hospital, To Write Love on Her Arms, NOH8 Campaign, Love Is Louder Than the Pressure to Be Perfect and the Jed Foundation. In 2013, Cyrus was named the fourteenth-most-charitable celebrity of the year by Do Something. She also appeared with Justin Bieber and Pitbull in a television special entitled The Real Change Project: Artists for Education. On August 28, 2014, Miley appeared alongside Justin Timberlake at an HIV/AIDS charity event in the White House.

At the 2014 MTV Video Music Awards, Cyrus won Video of the Year for her song Wrecking Ball. Instead of accepting the award herself, she invited a 22-year-old homeless man by the name of Jesse to collect it on her behalf; she had met him at My Friend's Place, an organization that helps homeless youth find shelter, work, health care, and education. His acceptance speech urged musicians to learn more about youth homelessness in Los Angeles through Cyrus's Facebook page. Cyrus then launched a Prizeo campaign to raise funds for the charity; those who made donations were entered into a sweepstake for a chance to meet Cyrus on her Bangerz Tour in Rio de Janeiro that September. In early 2015, Cyrus teamed up with MAC Cosmetics to launch her own branded Viva Glam lipstick, with proceeds to the Mac AIDS Fund.

In June 2017, Cyrus performed at One Love Manchester, a televised benefit concert organized by Ariana Grande following the Manchester Arena bombing on her concert two weeks earlier. During an appearance on The Ellen DeGeneres Show in August 2017, Cyrus said that she would donate $500,000 to Hurricane Harvey relief efforts. In August 2019, she performed at the Sunny Hill Festival in Kosovo, a festival to raise funds to help people with financial difficulties there, created by Dua Lipa and her father. In September 2019, Cyrus met with another fan through the Make-A-Wish Foundation at the 2019 iHeartRadio Music Festival in Las Vegas, Nevada. Cyrus and her boyfriend Cody Simpson donated 120 tacos to healthcare workers amid the COVID-19 pandemic in April 2020. That same month, she partnered again with MAC Cosmetics's annual Viva Glam campaign to donate $10 million toward 250 local organizations nationwide heavily impacted by the pandemic.

Cyrus showed support for the Black Lives Matter movement by sharing links and resources on social media, donning a Black Lives Matter face mask, and attending protests following the murder of George Floyd.

=== Happy Hippie Foundation ===
Cyrus is the founder of the Happy Hippie Foundation, which works to "fight injustice facing homeless youth, LGBTQ youth, and other vulnerable populations". From 2014 to 2016 the foundation served nearly 1,500 homeless youth in Los Angeles, reached more than 25,000 LGBTQ youth and their families with resources about gender, and provided social services to transgender individuals, youth in conflict zones, and people affected by crises. Happy Hippie encourages Cyrus's fans to support causes including gender equality, LGBTQ rights and mental health through awareness campaigns and fundraising. Leading up to the 2020 presidential election, Happy Hippie encouraged its Instagram followers to seek out VoteRiders for assistance ensuring that gender identity would not affect their right to vote.

On June 15, 2015, Cyrus launched the campaign #InstaPride in collaboration with Instagram. The campaign features a series of portraits starring transgender and gender-expansive people, which were posted to her Instagram feed with the hashtags "#HappyHippiePresents" and "#InstaPride". It stated that it was aimed at encouraging diversity and tolerance by showing these people in a positive light as examples for others who might be struggling to figure themselves out, and as a reference point for people who did not know personally anyone in that situation. Cyrus was behind the camera for the entire photoshoot, and interviewed her 14 subjects to share their personal stories. She said she wanted to bring attention to and celebrate people who would not normally find themselves being the stars of a photoshoot or portrayed on the cover of a magazine.

Following the loss of Miley and Hemsworth's Malibu home from the Woolsey Fire, the community and they launched the Malibu Foundation for relief efforts following the 2018 California wildfires, Miley's Happy Hippie Foundation donating $500,000 to the Malibu Foundation.

In 2024, Cyrus announced that the foundation would be renamed as Miley Cyrus Foundation.

== Legacy ==
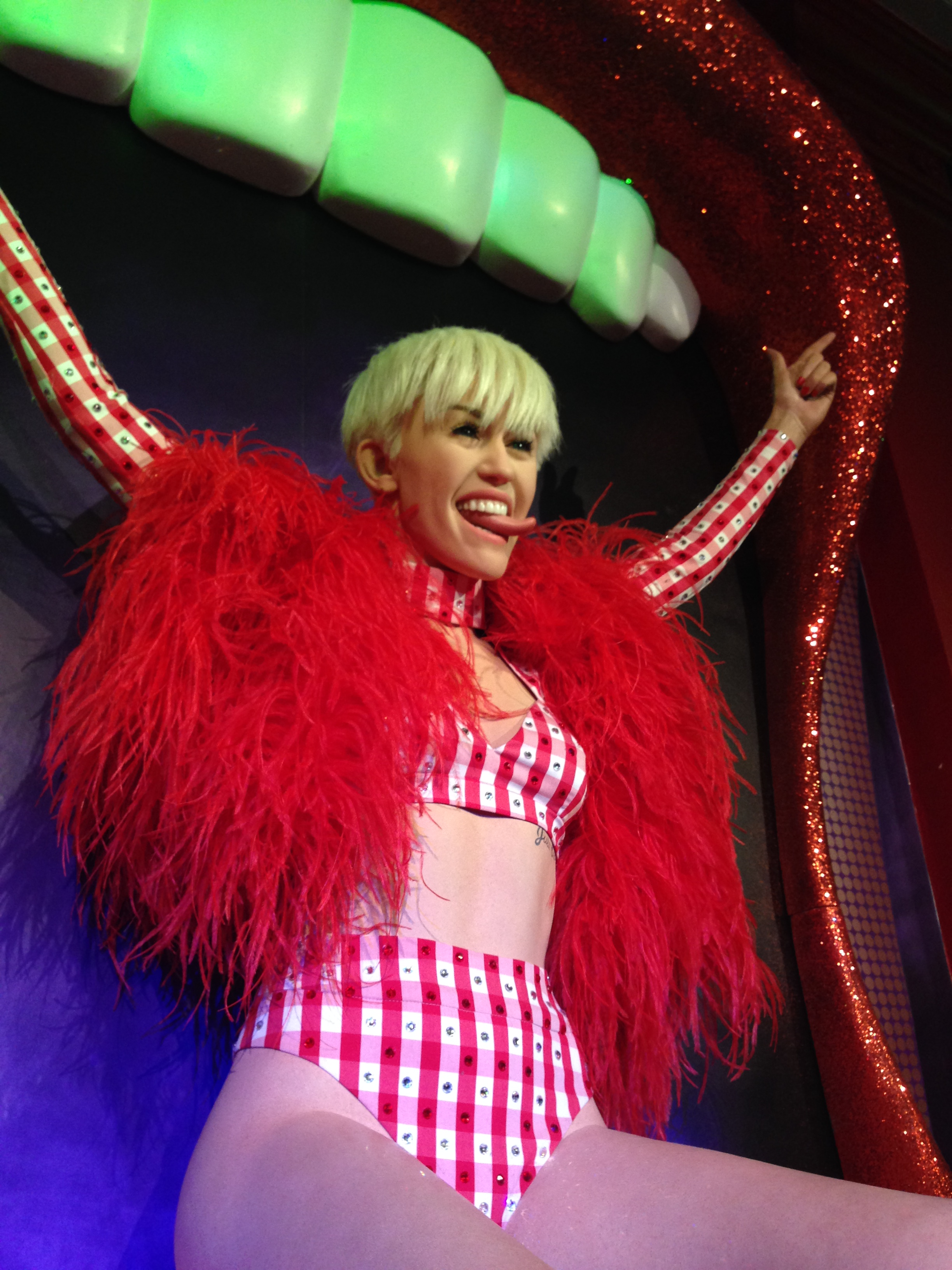
Miley Cyrus figure at Madame Tussauds London in 2016

Cyrus's early success as a teen idol and the face of Disney Channel's billion-dollar franchise Hannah Montana played an important role in shaping the 2000s teen pop culture, earning her the honorific nickname of "Teen Queen". Bickford stated Hannah Montana adopted a business model of combining celebrity acts with film, television, and popular music for a pre-adolescent audience. He called the series "genre-defining" and likened this model to 1990s teen pop artists such as Britney Spears and NSYNC, who were also marketed to children. Morgan Genevieve Blue of Feminist Media Studies stated the series' primary female characters, Miley and her alter ego Hannah, are positioned as post-feminist subjects in a way their representation is confined to notions of femininity and consumerism. The Times journalist Craig McLean named Cyrus the "world's biggest-ever teenage star".

During the Best of Both Worlds Tour, tickets were sold out in minutes and stadiums were completely filled making it the highest-grossing concert tour for a new act in 2007 and 2008. According to Billboard boxscore, the Best of Both Worlds Tour had a total attendance of approximately one million people and grossed over US$54 million, earning Cyrus the award for Breakthrough Act at the 2008 Billboard Touring Awards. In 2012, Rolling Stone ranked Cyrus as one of the top 25 teen idol breakout moments of the rock era, which Andy Greene wrote: "Miley's rise was meteoric. Tickets to her 2007 Best of Both Worlds tour sold out faster than any tour in memory ... It seemed like she was poised to become a more stable version of Britney Spears – especially after singles 'The Climb' and 'Party In The USA'". Due to her popularity, Paul McCartney compared their success to that of the Beatles in an interview during his tour in 2011. In this regard, he commented: "I think when they have new sensations, like Miley Cyrus or Justin Bieber, teenagers identify with them, in the same way that the boys identified with The Beatles, [...] when you have thousands of teenagers feeling the same, they become elated because they have this love for something in common, whether it is The Beatles, Miley Cyrus, Justin Bieber, or whatever."

Over the years, Cyrus's song "Party in the U.S.A." gained popularity in American culture on holidays and historic events. The song has re-entered the charts every Independence Day since its release. Following the death of Osama bin Laden on May 2, 2011, a resurgence in popularity of the music video occurred. The official YouTube video was flooded with comments regarding the death of bin Laden and it was immediately deemed a celebratory anthem for the event. In 2013, an online petition on the White House's "We the People" petitions website was urging then-president Barack Obama to change the U.S. national anthem from "The Star-Spangled Banner" to "Party in the U.S.A." Following the 2020 presidential election, as major news outlets announced Democratic nominee Joe Biden the winner of the presidential race, on November 7, 2020, supporters in New York City started singing "Party in the U.S.A." at Times Square.

Cyrus's album Bangerz (2013), along with its promotional events, is considered to be one of the most controversial moments in the 2010s wider popular culture and established Cyrus among the decade's most controversial figures. Glamour writer Mickey Woods likened the promotional "era" for the album to those of Britney Spears's and Christina Aguilera's third and fourth studio albums Britney (2001) and Stripped (2002), respectively, adding that Cyrus's record "will probably be retrospectively deemed iconic, maybe even classic". Billboard listed Bangerz as one of the greatest and most influential albums of the 2010s noting that "with this pivotal album release, Cyrus took control of her public persona, surprising less with her provocative antics than with her constant artistic evolution". The album was ranked number 230 on Rolling Stone's "250 Greatest Albums of the 21st Century". Bangerz is considered a trendsetter in "weaving together urban and pop influences, what's most revered now is what it represented then" according to Lyndsey Havens. Patrick Ryan of USA Today commented that Cyrus's collaborations with Mike Will Made It on the album contributed to his new-found prominence, stating that Mike Will Made It's position as an executive producer has helped him "[jump] to the forefront as an interesting character [...] in an era where a lot of producers have fallen behind the scenes again". Vice described Cyrus as "the most punk rock musician out there" and that she was "spinning circles around every single pop star who [was] trying to be edgy" at the time. MTV named Cyrus their Best Artist of 2013, and James Montgomery of MTV News elaborated on the network's decision that Cyrus "[declared] her independence and [dominated] the pop-culture landscape", adding that "she schooled—and shocked—us all in 2013, and did so on her own terms." Billboard staff called Cyrus the "Most Talked About Pop Star" of 2013, and also recognized the controversial evolution of her career as the "Top Music Moment" of the year, elaborating that she was a "maelstrom that expanded and grazed nearly every aspect of pop culture in 2013". The publication also ranked "We Can't Stop" as the best song of 2013 for being "one of the bolder musical choices in recent memory", and as one of the songs that defined the 2010s decade. The song's music video and Cyrus's controversial 2013 VMAs performance with Robin Thicke were declared as the 27th greatest music video and one of the most "defining" pop culture moments of the 2010s. In 2025, The Needle Drop's Anthony Fantano pointed Cyrus as "one of a few artists who's actually managed to keep her career interesting after riding the Disney Channel actress to pop star pipeline" stating that "in a lot of ways, you could actually say she set the tone for some of these newer faces who took a similar path and also got a bit edgier in their transition into pop stardom".

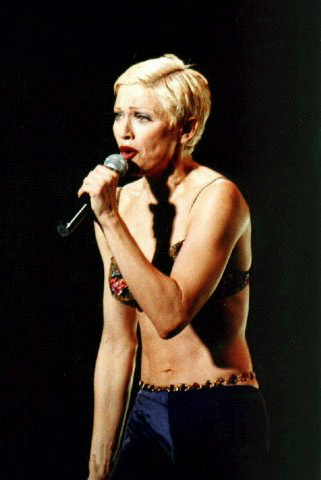
Cyrus has been compared to American singer, Madonna, being considered by others as the "Madonna of her generation".

In 2015, Rebecca Nicholson from The Guardian published an article calling Cyrus the Madonna of her generation, saying that "she's a Disney survivor with a fluid approach to gender identity. And, like the old three-chord punks, she gives really good quote". According to Nicholson, Cyrus takes "the 90s Madonna approach to public sexuality: it's deliberately provocative, and crucially, it is not being served up for male consumption." Likewise, she defends Cyrus's controversial rebellion, highlighting that behind the character there is a human, talented and strong person who manages to connect with the public, just like the "Queen of Pop". In November of the same year, Vulture ranked Cyrus number one on its "Disney and Nickelodeon Stars Gone Pop" listicle, writing that "no post-millennium child star [had] grown up as wildly, rapidly, or successfully as [Cyrus]" at the time. Appearing at number eight on the 2021 revision of the ranking, the publication named her as one of the few child stars with a successful music career as an adult, calling her "the archetype for Disney 2.0 stars" who "picked up the child-star trap of getting pigeonholed and set it on fire". Billboard cataloged the singer as one of the "Greatest of All Time Billboard 200 Artists", occupying position thirty-one; she was on the ninth rank among female artists. In 2017, the aforementioned magazine also published an article naming the singer a "Queer Superhero" for her philanthropic fight for the LGBTQ+ community. In 2019, Billboard ranked her 62nd on its "Greatest of All Time Artists" chart, and 55th on the 2010s decade-end chart of Top Artists, signifying the most successful acts of the decade.

Due to her continual artistic reinventions, sonic and stylistic evolution, and versatility, Cyrus has been nicknamed the "Pop Chameleon" by media and various publications. She has also been considered a pop icon by several publications, with the BBC calling her "the ultimate 21st century pop star". In 2023, The Hollywood Reporter named Cyrus as one of its "Platinum Players" in music. Billboard included Cyrus in its "Greatest Pop Stars of 2023" listicle, naming her the "Comeback Artist of the Year". The magazine called her 2023 single "Flowers" the "biggest chart smash of her career" and noted that it "re-established [Cyrus] as one of pop's foremost hitmakers". In 2024, at age 31, Cyrus became the youngest recipient of the Disney Legends award, for her outstanding contributions to the Walt Disney Company. That year, she was ranked number 15 on Billboard's "Greatest Pop Stars of the 21st Century"; the magazine wrote that Cyrus has "endured as one of the century's most significant pop stars—because no matter what style she's trying out, at the end of the day, she's always still just being Miley". In 2025, Billboard ranked her twenty-first on its "Top Artists of the 21st Century" list, and ninth on its "Top 100 Women Artists of the 21st Century" list. Cyrus was honored with the Innovator Award at the 2026 iHeartRadio Music Awards. In May 2026, she received her own star in the Hollywood Walk of Fame as a recognition of her success. Artists that have cited Cyrus or her work as inspiration or an influence include Adéla, Chappell Roan, JoJo Siwa, Lea Michele, Lil Nas X, and Troye Sivan.

== Discography ==
- Meet Miley Cyrus (2007)
- Breakout (2008)
- Can't Be Tamed (2010)
- Bangerz (2013)
- Miley Cyrus & Her Dead Petz (2015)
- Younger Now (2017)
- Plastic Hearts (2020)
- Endless Summer Vacation (2023)
- Something Beautiful (2025)
- Bass Persuades (2026)

== Filmography ==
Films

- Big Fish (2003)
- Bolt (2008)
- Hannah Montana: The Movie (2009)
- The Last Song (2010)
- LOL (2012)
- So Undercover (2012)
- Miley Cyrus: Tongue Tied (2014)
- Guardians of the Galaxy Vol. 2 (2017)
- Drive-Away Dolls (2024)
- Something Beautiful (2025)

Television

- Hannah Montana (2006–2011)
- Crisis in Six Scenes (2016)
- Miley's New Year's Eve Party (2021–2022)
- Human Resources (2023)

Documentary and concert films

- Hannah Montana & Miley Cyrus: Best of Both Worlds Concert (2008)
- Miley: The Movement (2013)
- MTV Unplugged Presents: Miley Cyrus Backyard Sessions (2020)
- Endless Summer Vacation (Backyard Sessions) (2023)
- Hannah Montana 20th Anniversary Special (2026)

== Tours ==
Headlining

- Best of Both Worlds Tour (2007–2008)
- Wonder World Tour (2009)
- Gypsy Heart Tour (2011)
- Bangerz Tour (2014)

Promotional

- Milky Milky Milk Tour (2015)
- Attention Tour (2022)

Opening act

- The Cheetah Girls – The Party's Just Begun Tour (2006–2007)

== Recognition ==
Throughout her career, Cyrus has received several awards and nominations. In 2009, at only 16 years old, she received her first Golden Globe nomination for Best Original Song with the song "I Thought I Lost You" featuring John Travolta for the movie Bolt, since then she has received two more nominations in the same category, in 2025 with the song "Beautiful That Way" for the movie The Last Showgirl and in 2026 with the song "Dream As One" for the movie Avatar: Fire and Ash. She also won the MTV Movie Award for Best Song From A Movie with her song "The Climb" in 2009. She received 16 nominations at the World Music Awards in 2014 and 50 Teen Choice Award nominations from 2006 to 2014, making her the most nominated person in the history of the Teen Choice Awards. In 2024, she won her first two Grammy Awards at the 66th Annual Grammy Awards and by 2026 she has accumulated 10 nominations.

== See also ==
- Honorific nicknames in popular music
- List of Billboard Social 50 number-one artists
- List of most-followed Instagram accounts
