= We Can't Stop =

2013 single by Miley Cyrus

Single by Miley Cyrus

from the album Bangerz
- Released: June 3, 2013
- Studio: Nightbird Recording Studios (West Hollywood, CA); Conway Recording Studios (Los Angeles, CA); Glenwood Studios (Burbank, CA)
- Genre: Pop; R&B; electropop
- Length: 3:51
- Label: RCA
- Songwriters: Mike L. Williams II; Pierre Ramon Slaughter; Timothy Thomas; Theron Thomas; Miley Cyrus; Douglas Davis; Ricky Walters
- Producers: Mike Will Made It; P-Nasty; R. City

Miley Cyrus singles chronology
"Fall Down" (2013)	"We Can't Stop" (2013)	"Wrecking Ball" (2013)

Music videos
- "We Can't Stop" on YouTube; "We Can’t Stop" (Director’s Cut) on YouTube

"We Can't Stop" is a song by American singer Miley Cyrus, from her fourth studio album Bangerz (2013). It was released on June 3, 2013, by RCA Records as the lead single from the album. The song was written and produced by Mike Will Made It, P-Nasty, and R. City, with additional songwriting provided by Cyrus, Doug E. Fresh, and Slick Rick. "We Can't Stop" is a pop, R&B and electropop song about a house party and recreational drug use.

The song received mixed reviews from music critics, who appreciated its overall production but were scathing toward its lyrical content. It peaked at number two on the Billboard Hot 100, thus tying with "Party in the U.S.A." (2009) as Cyrus's highest-charting single in the United States at the time. It was kept off the top spot by "Blurred Lines" by Robin Thicke featuring Pharrell and T.I. With varying success internationally, "We Can't Stop" reached the peak position in countries including New Zealand and the United Kingdom, and peaked moderately in several national record charts in Europe. The song is certified eight-times platinum in the United States, seven-times platinum in Australia and Norway, multi-platinum in Canada, Sweden, and the United Kingdom; and gold or higher in eight additional countries.

An accompanying music video for "We Can't Stop" was released on June 19, 2013. It received mixed reviews from critics, who were divided in their opinions regarding Cyrus's increasingly provocative image. With 10.7 million views in the first 24 hours of its release, the clip held the record for having the most views in that time-frame across Vevo platforms; after reaching 100 million views within 37 days, it also set the record for being the fastest music video to attain a Vevo certification. Both records were eventually broken by the music video for Cyrus's follow-up single "Wrecking Ball" in September 2013. "We Can't Stop" was additionally promoted with a highly controversial performance at the 2013 MTV Video Music Awards.

== Background ==
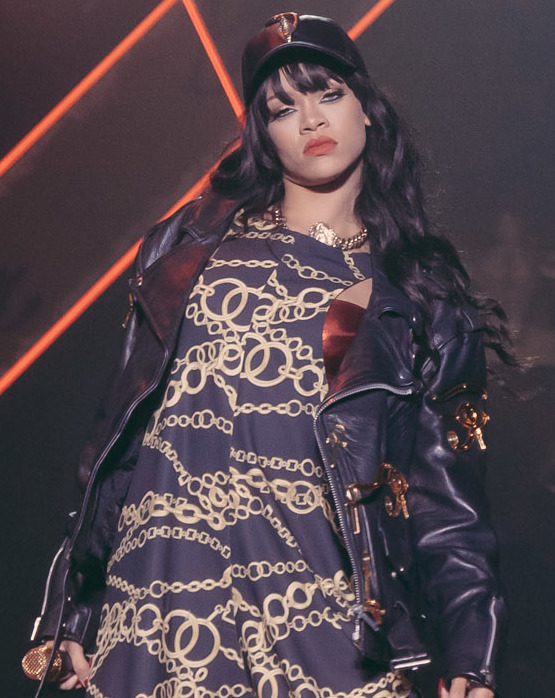
"We Can't Stop" was originally written with Rihanna (pictured) in mind before being offered to Cyrus.

In 2010, Cyrus announced plans to focus on her film career, effectively putting her musical endeavors on hiatus. She later appeared in the films LOL and So Undercover. She was also confirmed as a primary voice actress in the feature film Hotel Transylvania, but dropped out of the project to coordinate a musical comeback. In January 2013, Cyrus ended her recording contract with Hollywood Records, under which she released the studio albums Meet Miley Cyrus (2007), Breakout (2008), Can't Be Tamed (2010), and the extended play (EP) The Time of Our Lives (2009), signing a recording contract with RCA Records. In March, she confirmed that her fourth studio album would be released by the end of 2013.

Production duo Rock City stated that "We Can't Stop" was originally written with singer Rihanna in mind before offering it to record producer Mike Will Made It, who ultimately offered it to Cyrus. They felt that "this could be somebody’s first single", and decided against Rihanna because of the commercial success of her track "Diamonds" in 2012. Cyrus commented that "it really just turned out to be perfect and exactly what I wanted, and exactly what I wanted my first sound to be, and my first look to be".

During the 2013 Billboard Music Awards on May 19, 2013, Cyrus announced that the track would be released on June 3. The cover artwork for "We Can't Stop" was unveiled in a billboard in Times Square on May 28. It shows the arms of two people holding Solo Cups, with several people in the background; Cyrus is notably absent from the image. Cyrus herself appeared on On Air with Ryan Seacrest on June 3 to premiere the track on the radio program, hosted by Ryan Seacrest.

== Composition ==
"We Can't Stop"
A 16-second sample of "We Can't Stop" by Miley Cyrus, where a portion of the chorus is heard.

"We Can't Stop" is a mid-tempo pop, R&B and electropop song. It is written in the key of E major with a tempo of 80 beats per minute in common time, and Cyrus' vocals span two octaves, from the low note of B_{2} to a high F♯_{5}. The song follows the chord progression E–G♯m–C♯m–A (I–iii–vi–IV). The track also includes a sample of the track "La Di Da Di" by Doug E. Fresh and MC Ricky D. John Kennedy of Vibe compared the track to the works of Rihanna.

Cyrus has stated that "We Can't Stop" represents "where I'm at in my life now". Lyrically, the track describes a house party, as mentioned in the opening lines "It's our party, we can do what we want / It's our party, we can say what we want / It's our party, we can love who we want / We can kiss who we want / We can live how we want". It also makes several references to recreational drug use, including "dancing with molly", using a slang term for ecstasy, and "trying to get a line [of cocaine] in the bathroom".

== Critical reception ==
"We Can't Stop" received mixed reviews from music critics, who appreciated its overall production but were negative towards its lyrical content. Adam Carlson of Entertainment Weekly provided a favorable review, writing that the lyrics were questionable but "infectious", adding that it reminded him of "Kesha on Benadryl." Sam Lansky from Idolator noted that stands apart from other songs recently played on mainstream radio, adding that it "just feels strange, and kind of wonderful", while the Los Angeles Times' Mikael Woods labeled it "the calmest, most clear-eyed rebel yell since Janet Jackson's "Control." Sean Daly of the Tampa Bay Times and The Wall Street Journal's staff both appreciated the catchy melody, while Lyndsey Parker from Yahoo! Music felt that "We Can't Stop" acted as a sequel to Cyrus's earlier single "Party in the U.S.A.", with the difference that "she's just partying a little harder now."

However, in a more mixed review, Randall Roberts of the Los Angeles Times felt that the song "seems as if it were written by a ninth-grader imagining her rebellious college sister’s lifestyle" and felt that it lacked creativity within Cyrus's catalog. Writing for Rolling Stone, Jon Dolan was skeptical of Cyrus's increasingly provocative image, stating that the lyrics in the chorus would be "an odd fit for any singer" and opining that "there's still a bit too much Disney in her voice to fill the track." Naomi Zeichner of The Fader praised the song, writing, "Cyrus said in her recent MTV doc (Miley: The Movement), that she chose it to be her album's first single: 'Not everyone came to me and said okay, you've got the first single. I had to say no, I know this is it and I'll go to battle if I have to, against anyone who doesn't believe in it. Now I have this freedom to do whatever I want, because people trust me.' She was right about this one. The song's straightforward party is now tied to a sordid universe of visuals- the official video and the VMA performance." Common Sense Media gave the song two stars out of five saying that "After listening to the weird intro to "We Can't Stop" you'll kind of wish the song did just stop right there."

"We Can't Stop" won the award for "Choice Summer Song" and was nominated for "Choice Single: Female Artist" at the 2013 Teen Choice Awards in August. In December, Billboard critics listed it as the best song of 2013 for being "one of the bolder musical choices in recent memory, and that risk paid off tremendously." The Village Voice's Pazz & Jop annual critics' poll ranked "We Can't Stop" at number nine on their poll to find the best music of 2013. Pitchfork Media ranked "We Can't Stop" at number 131 on the websites list of the 200 Best Tracks of the Decade So Far (2010-2014). Upon the release of "Flowers" (2023), Billboard staff ranked all Cyrus's lead singles and put "We Can't Stop" at first in which Jason Lipchutz wrote: "no other Cyrus lead single is as crucial to her career as 'We Can’t Stop'."

== Commercial performance ==
In the United States, "We Can't Stop" debuted at number 11 on the Billboard Hot 100 with first-week sales of 214,000 downloads. In its seventh week on the chart the track reached number two, and remained at that peak for three weeks, but it was blocked off of number one by "Blurred Lines" by Robin Thicke. This peak allowed "We Can't Stop" to tie with "Party in the U.S.A." as Cyrus's highest-peaking single in the country at the time until she topped the Hot 100 with "Wrecking Ball". As of December 2014, the song has sold 3,280,000 copies in the United States. "We Can't Stop" peaked at number three on the Canadian Hot 100, and has been certified quadruple-platinum by Music Canada.

"We Can't Stop" experienced varying commercial success throughout Europe. In the United Kingdom, it debuted at the top of the UK Singles Chart on August 11, 2013 ― for the week ending date August 17, 2013 ― becoming her first top-ten success and number-one hit in Britain. She also became the first Disney star to top the charts in that country. It has since been certified double-platinum by the British Phonographic Industry (BPI). "We Can't Stop" peaked at number eight on the Ö3 Austria Top 40. It also peaked at numbers 11 and 20 on the Belgian Ultratop in Wallonia and Flanders, respectively. "We Can't Stop" charted at number 11 on the Danish Tracklisten, where it was also recognized with a platinum certification for streaming. The song charted at number three on the Norwegian VG-lista, and number five on both the Spanish Singles Chart and the Swedish Sverigetopplistan, number seven on the Irish Singles Chart, and number nine in the Czech Republic. The track also reached number ten on the Official Lebanese Top 20.

In other parts of the continent, "We Can't Stop" charted in the lower ends of national record charts. The track reached number 15 on the Official Finnish Chart, number 16 on the German GfK Entertainment chart, and number 19 in both Slovakia and on the Swiss Hitparade. It peaked at numbers 26, 33, and 48 on the French SNEP, Italian FIMI, and Dutch Single Top 100, respectively. In Oceania, "We Can't Stop" peaked at numbers four and one on the Australian ARIA Chart and the Official New Zealand Music Chart, respectively. It was certified 7× platinum in the former territory, and 4× platinum in the latter. In Asia, the song reached number seven on the Japan Hot 100 and number 29 on the South Korean Circle Digital Chart.

== Music video ==
=== Summary ===
A screenshot of the music video for "We Can't Stop", where Cyrus is seen twerking

An accompanying music video for "We Can't Stop" was directed by Diane Martel, and was premiered through Vevo on June 19, 2013. The clip depicts an ongoing house party, where guests are engaging in numerous bizarre actions. Among the activities taking place are the creation of a mountain made of white bread, the kicking of a skull made of French fries, and the simulated slicing of a woman's fingers. Also seen are clips of the parametric 3D modeled human face created by Frederic Parke at the University of Utah in 1974. Product placement is also commonplace as Cyrus amplifies her Beats Pill speaker and applies her EOS lip balm. A director's cut of the music video was released on July 29, which Carl Williott of Idolator noted featured "more simulated sex, one oral sex gesture near the end and actually less Miley tongue overall."

=== Reception ===
The clip received generally mixed reviews from critics, who were divided in their opinions regarding Cyrus's increasingly provocative image. Jeremy Cabalona from Mashable compared its concept to that of "Just Dance" by Lady Gaga, while James Montgomery of MTV News noted similarities to the music videos for "Dirrty" by Christina Aguilera and "Criminal" by Fiona Apple. Jason Lipshutz of Billboard provided a favorable review, calling it "fantastically unhinged and purposefully button-pushing", while Bonnie Fuller from The Huffington Post praised the "high-spirited celebration of the freedom that young women are blessed with today to fully explore and celebrate their sexuality." On their list of the ten best music videos of 2013, Rolling Stone placed "We Can't Stop" at number one, describing it as a "masterpiece for the ages".

Writing for The Washington Post, Cara Kelly provided a mixed review, feeling that the video recalled "episodes of Girls mashed with Rita Ora and Chanel West Coast." Patrick Ryan from USA Today called the clip a "bizarre, entertaining but arguably desperate effort", while Haley Dodd from RyanSeacrest.com thought that the video presented "maybe a little too much" of Cyrus's "edgier side". It was later nominated for Best Pop Video, Best Female Video, Best Editing, and Best Song of the Summer for the 2013 MTV Video Music Awards.

With 10.7 million views in the first 24 hours of its release, the clip held the record for having the most views in that time-frame across Vevo platforms. However, she was later surpassed by "Best Song Ever" by One Direction, which generated 12.3 million views in 24 hours. After reaching 100 million views in 37 days, it also set the record for being the fastest music video to attain a Vevo certification. Both records were eventually broken by the music video for Cyrus's follow-up single "Wrecking Ball" in September; it reached 19.3 million first-day views and passed 100 million views in six days.

== Live performances ==
Cyrus first performed "We Can't Stop" at Jimmy Kimmel Live! on June 26, 2013, and at Good Morning America the following day. In September 2013, Cyrus sang "We Can't Stop" on Schlag den Raab in Germany, Le Grand Journal in France, and Alan Carr: Chatty Man in England. On September 21, she sang twice at iHeartRadio Music Festival in Las Vegas, in the afternoon at festival village and in the evening at MGM Grand Garden Arena. Despite generating media attention for a provocative wardrobe, the performance was considered to be "fairly tame considering the VMAs."

On October 5, 2013, Cyrus served as the host and musical guest during an episode of Saturday Night Live, and performed an acoustic version of the song, in addition to a parody of the song titled "We Did Stop" about the 2013 United States federal government shutdown. The following Monday, Cyrus performed "We Can't Stop" on Today as part of their Toyota Concert Series. She appeared on Late Night with Jimmy Fallon and The Ellen DeGeneres Show later that month, and sang the track during both programs. In November, Cyrus traveled to Europe again to sing "We Can't Stop" at the 2013 MTV Europe Music Awards in Amsterdam on November 10; she garnered media attention for smoking a joint of marijuana on-stage. In December, she performed at Jingle Ball concerts in Los Angeles (KIIS-FM Jingle Ball), Saint Paul, Atlanta, New York City, Washington, D.C., Tampa and Sunrise. An episode of MTV Unplugged starring Cyrus premiered through MTV on January 29, 2014; Madonna appeared as a surprise guest that evening to sing an acoustic medley of "We Can't Stop" and her 2000 single "Don't Tell Me". Later that year, Cyrus performed "We Can't Stop" during her headlining Bangerz Tour. A critic from the Nashville Scene praised Cyrus's performance, writing, "We Can't Stop was sung by Miley and hilariously lip-synced by a kitten on screen." Blake Hannon provided a positive review, writing, "The crowd erupted for the opening notes of We Can't Stop." Cyrus returned to perform the song during the musical festival on June 21, 2014, Summertime Ball at Wembley Stadium of London, in front of 80,000 people.

=== MTV Video Music Awards ===
In August 2013, Cyrus became the subject of widespread international media attention and public scrutiny following a performance and duet with Robin Thicke at the 2013 MTV Video Music Awards at Barclays Center in New York City. The performance began with Cyrus performing "We Can't Stop" in bear-themed attire. Following this, Thicke entered the stage and Cyrus stripped down to a flesh-colored two-piece latex outfit while they performed "Blurred Lines" in a duet. Cyrus subsequently touched Thicke's crotch area with a giant manicured foam finger and twerked against him. The Hollywood Reporter described the performance as "crass" and "reminiscent of a bad acid trip". The performance was described by XXL critic B. J. Steiner as a "trainwreck in the classic sense of the word as the audience reaction seemed to be a mix of confusion, dismay and horror in a cocktail of embarrassment", while the BBC said Cyrus stole the show with a "raunchy performance". The performance generated 306,100 tweets per minute on Twitter, breaking the record for the most tweeted-about event in the history of the social network; the previous record, held by the Super Bowl XLVII halftime show featuring Beyoncé, generated 268,000 tweets per minute. Rob Sheffield of Rolling Stone magazine published an article on the presentation of Cyrus at the MTV Video Music Awards 2013, writing that "Miley was the one star in the room who truly understood what the MTV Video Music Awards are all about — waggling your tongue, grabbing your crotch, rocking a foam finger, going to third with the Care Bears, twerking and shrieking and acting out America's goriest pop-psycho nightmares. She showed up Robin Thicke as one uptight douche, though he helped by dressing as the world's edgiest Foot Locker manager. Miley stole the night, which is why the nation is still in recovery today. Thanks, Miley." According to Forbes, Cyrus's performance resulted in a gain of over 213,000 Twitter followers, 226,000 likes on Facebook, and 90,000 downloads of her new promotional single, "Wrecking Ball", within days of the controversial performance. This amounted to a total 112% increase in Cyrus's social media activity.

== Cover versions ==
In July 2013, Rebecca Black released an acoustic cover of "We Can't Stop", for which there were lyrical changes made. In September 2013, Scott Bradlee's band Postmodern Jukebox made a doo-wop cover of the song. Later in September, British band Bastille performed a rock version of the song at BBC Radio 1's Live Lounge, using portions of "Lose Yourself" by Eminem in the introduction, "I Just Can't Wait to Be King" from the 1994 film The Lion King at the end of each chorus, and referencing "Achy Breaky Heart" by Cyrus's father Billy Ray. They won an award for this cover at the MTV Woodies. Mike Wass from Idolator commented that they brought "emotional depth and a previously absent musicality" and that they turned the song into "an eerily pretty mid-tempo ballad". Later that month, indie musician Logan Lynn released a cover version of the track, which Lindsey Weber of New York Magazine called "dreamy [and] guitar-heavy" and an editor from The Huffington Post called "bold" and "warmer" than the original. British singer Neon Hitch released a cover of "We Can't Stop" with lyrical adjustments, which Jenna Hally Rubenstein from MTV Buzzworthy called a "kinda-reggae-kinda-jazz-kinda ska-definitely-awesome cover". The track was also performed by Avery, the Vamps, and Tay Zonday. In 2014, the Electrical Fire released a cover version of the song, as well as an alternate version which combined it with Kanye West's "Runaway", pointing out the similarity between the two songs. Later in 2014 Bastille won Best Cover Woodie award in the mtvU Woodie Awards for covering the track.

A marching band version of the song, by Sonic Boom of the South, Jackson State University's marching band, is featured at the end of the 2018 black comedy film Assassination Nation.

== Lawsuit ==
In 2018, Jamaican artist Flourgon filed a copyright infringement suit in the United States District Court for the Southern District of New York against Cyrus and RCA Records, alleging that Cyrus had unlawfully used the "original, creative and unique lyrical phraseology" of his 1988 reggae song "We Run Things" as the repeated chorus and hook of "We Can't Stop"; specifically, he alleged that the phrase "We run things/ Things don't run we" from "We Can't Stop" was substantially similar to the phrase "We run things/Things no run we" from "We Run Things".

The parties settled the lawsuit out of court and the case was subsequently dismissed in early 2020.

== Track listing and formats ==
Digital download

1. "We Can't Stop" – 3:52

CD

1. "We Can't Stop" – 4:00
2. "We Can't Stop" (instrumental) – 3:57

== Credits and personnel ==
Credits adapted from the liner notes of Bangerz.

Recording

- Recorded at NightBird Recording Studios (West Hollywood, California); Conway Recording Studios (Los Angeles, California); Glenwood Studios, (Burbank, California)
- Mixed at The Penua Project/Innersound Management at Larrabee Sound Studios (North Hollywood, California)

Personnel

- Miley Cyrus – backing vocals, lead vocals, songwriter
- Douglas Davis – songwriter
- Mike Gaydusek – assistant
- Trehy Harris – assistant
- Stephen Hybicki – recording
- Jaycen Joshua – mixing
- Mike Will Made It – songwriter, producer
- Chris "TEK" O'Ryan – mixing
- Eva Reistad – assistant
- Ruben Rivera – recording
- Tim Roberts – recording
- Pierre Ramon Slaughter – songwriter, producer
- Timothy Thomas – songwriter, producer, vocal production
- Theron Thomas – songwriter, producer, vocal production
- Ricky Walters – songwriter

== Charts ==
=== Weekly charts ===
Weekly chart performance for "We Can't Stop"
Chart (2013–2014)	Peak position
Australia (ARIA)	4
Austria (Ö3 Austria Top 40)	8
Belgium (Ultratop 50 Flanders)	20
Belgium (Ultratop 50 Wallonia)	11
Canada Hot 100 (Billboard)	3
CIS Airplay (TopHit)	25
Czech Republic Airplay (ČNS IFPI)	9
Denmark (Tracklisten)	11
Finland (Suomen virallinen lista)	15
France (SNEP)	26
Germany (GfK)	16
Ireland (IRMA)	7
Italy (FIMI)	33
Japan Hot 100 (Billboard)	7
Lebanon (Lebanese Top 20)	10
Mexico (Billboard Mexican Airplay)	33
Netherlands (Dutch Top 40 Tipparade)	4
Netherlands (Single Top 100)	48
New Zealand (Recorded Music NZ)	1
Norway (VG-lista)	3
Romania (Airplay 100)	86
Russia Airplay (TopHit)	17
Scottish Singles Sales (Official Charts)	1
Slovakia Airplay (ČNS IFPI)	19
Slovenia Airplay (SloTop50)	35
South Africa Airplay (EMA)	5
South Korea (Gaon)	29
Spain (Promusicae)	5
Sweden (Sverigetopplistan)	5
Switzerland (Schweizer Hitparade)	19
Ukraine Airplay (TopHit)	146
UK Singles (Official Charts)	1
US Billboard Hot 100	2
US Adult Pop Airplay (Billboard)	40
US Dance Club Songs (Billboard)	34
US Dance Airplay (Billboard)	14
US Pop Airplay (Billboard)	9
US Rhythmic Airplay (Billboard)	16

=== Year-end charts ===
2013 year-end chart performance for "We Can't Stop"
Chart (2013)	Position
Australia (ARIA)	30
Austria (Ö3 Austria Top 40)	59
Belgium (Ultratop 50 Flanders)	78
Belgium (Ultratop 50 Wallonia)	72
Canada (Canadian Hot 100)	32
Denmark Streaming (Tracklisten)	44
France (SNEP)	127
Germany (Media Control AG)	92
New Zealand (Recorded Music NZ)	26
Russia Airplay (TopHit)	156
Spain (PROMUSICAE)	39
Sweden (Sverigetopplistan)	34
Taiwan (Hito Radio)	4
UK Singles (OCC)	28
US Billboard Hot 100	17
US Mainstream Top 40 (Billboard)	44

2014 year-end chart performance for "We Can't Stop"
Chart (2014)	Position
Spain Streaming (PROMUSICAE)	100

== Certifications ==
Certifications for "We Can't Stop"
Region	Certification	Certified units/sales
Australia (ARIA)	7× Platinum	490,000^{‡}
Austria (IFPI Austria)	Gold	15,000^{*}
Brazil (Pro-Música Brasil)	2× Diamond	500,000^{‡}
Canada (Music Canada)	4× Platinum	320,000^{*}
Germany (BVMI)	Gold	150,000^{^}
Italy (FIMI)	Platinum	50,000^{‡}
Mexico (AMPROFON)	Platinum	60,000^{*}
New Zealand (RMNZ)	5× Platinum	150,000^{‡}
Norway (IFPI Norway)	7× Platinum	420,000^{‡}
Spain (Promusicae)	2× Platinum	120,000^{‡}
Sweden (GLF)	3× Platinum	120,000^{‡}
Switzerland (IFPI Switzerland)	Gold	15,000^{^}
United Kingdom (BPI)	2× Platinum	1,200,000^{‡}
United States (RIAA)	8× Platinum	8,000,000^{‡}
Streaming
Denmark (IFPI Danmark)	Platinum	1,800,000^{†}
^{*} Sales figures based on certification alone.^{^} Shipments figures based on certification alone.^{‡} Sales+streaming figures based on certification alone.^{†} Streaming-only figures based on certification alone.

== Release history ==
"We Can't Stop" release history
Region	Date	Format(s)	Version(s)	Label	Ref.
United States	June 3, 2013	Digital download	Original	RCA	
France	June 4, 2013	Digital download	Original	RCA	
Germany	June 4, 2013	Digital download	Original	RCA	
Italy	June 4, 2013	Digital download	Original	RCA	
United States	June 11, 2013	Contemporary hit radio; rhythmic contemporary radio	Original	RCA	
Italy	July 13, 2013	Radio airplay	Original	Sony	
United Kingdom	August 4, 2013	Digital download	Original	RCA	
Germany	September 6, 2013	CD	Original; instrumental	RCA	

== See also ==
- List of UK Singles Chart number ones of the 2010s
