= Miley: The Movement =

2013 documentary starring Miley Cyrus

- Promotional poster
- Genre: Documentary
- Directed by: Paul Bozymowski
- Starring: Miley Cyrus
- Country of origin: United States

Production
- Producers: Joanna Bomberg; Miley Cyrus; Tish Cyrus; Jon Doran; Jon Kamen; Jonathan Mussman; Melissa Ruderman; Larry Rudolph; Frank Scherma; Dave Sirulnick; Justin Wilkes
- Running time: 60 minutes (standard); 90 minutes (deluxe)
- Production company: RadicalMedia

Original release
- Network: MTV
- Release: October 2, 2013
- Release: October 6, 2013 (extended)

Miley: The Movement is a 2013 documentary television film about American entertainer Miley Cyrus, following her return to the music industry in the lead-up to her fourth studio album Bangerz (2013). It premiered on October 2, 2013, on MTV, shortly before the release of her record, for which the documentary served as a promotional tool. The documentary depicts Cyrus finalizing details regarding its launch, making public appearances for additional promotion, and rehearsing for her controversial performance at the 2013 MTV Video Music Awards.

Miley: The Movement received generally mixed reviews from mainstream critics, who appreciated Cyrus' seemingly genuine commentary, but were disappointed by its failure to fully discuss her recent controversies and public criticisms. According to Nielsen ratings, it was watched by approximately 1.6 million viewers in the United States. An extended version of the documentary was broadcast by MTV on October 6, 2013.

== Background and production ==
It was first announced that Cyrus would appear in a documentary broadcast by MTV in July 2013; an official statement published by the network elaborated that it would "[follow] Cyrus as she works on the album and delves deep into the transformation she has experienced over the past few years." Its title was announced on September 10, with a broadcast date confirmed for October 2. It premiered shortly before the release of Cyrus' fourth studio album Bangerz, for which the documentary served as a promotional tool. An official trailer was released by MTV on September 18. Miley: The Movement was screened to mainstream critics the week prior to its official release, although it was further reworked before being broadcast on the network.

== Synopsis ==
"My whole life it was never about having control. Shit would just come out with my face on it, and that was it. So now nothing can have my face on it, my name on it, that isn't dope, that isn't a part of the movement."

— Cyrus describing her image with her "movement".

Miley: The Movement commences with Cyrus stating "I don't apologize for anything." Shortly after, she comments that "For me, the movement needs to be something bigger than just a record. For me, a movement is something that represents, like, taking over the world." Cyrus notably avoids specifically naming her former television series Hannah Montana, instead calling it "my show" when flashback pictures of her earlier career was shown, presumably to distance herself from the franchise. However, she commented that after its conclusion "I made one movie, and I never wanted to do it again. I want to make music for the rest of my life." Having been filmed after Bangerz was recorded, the documentary instead depicts Cyrus finalizing details including its album artwork and track listing. A brief discussion in a recording studio with Britney Spears, who is featured on the track "SMS (Bangerz)" is additionally included.

Cyrus' former fiancé Liam Hemsworth, whom she had been in a highly publicized relationship with before ending her engagement in September 2013, and father Billy Ray Cyrus are not mentioned during the program in an intentional effort to "focus on music and professional footage." Cyrus' mother Tish frequently appears during Miley: The Movement, and on one occasion describes her initial hesitation after Cyrus befriended hip hop producers and recording artists Juicy J, Pharrell Williams, and Mike Will Made It. Cyrus is seen making promotional appearances for further promotion of Bangerz in the three months before its release. The preparation for her controversial performance of "We Can't Stop" at the 2013 MTV Video Music Awards serves as a recurring theme; she expresses concern that the track itself charted lower than Cyrus expected on the iTunes Store immediately after its release, experiences a brief illness during rehearsals, and becomes upset after her planned entrance to the event did not come to fruition. The final performance itself is not shown, although Cyrus briefly addresses criticism and describes it as "a strategic hot mess."

== Reception ==
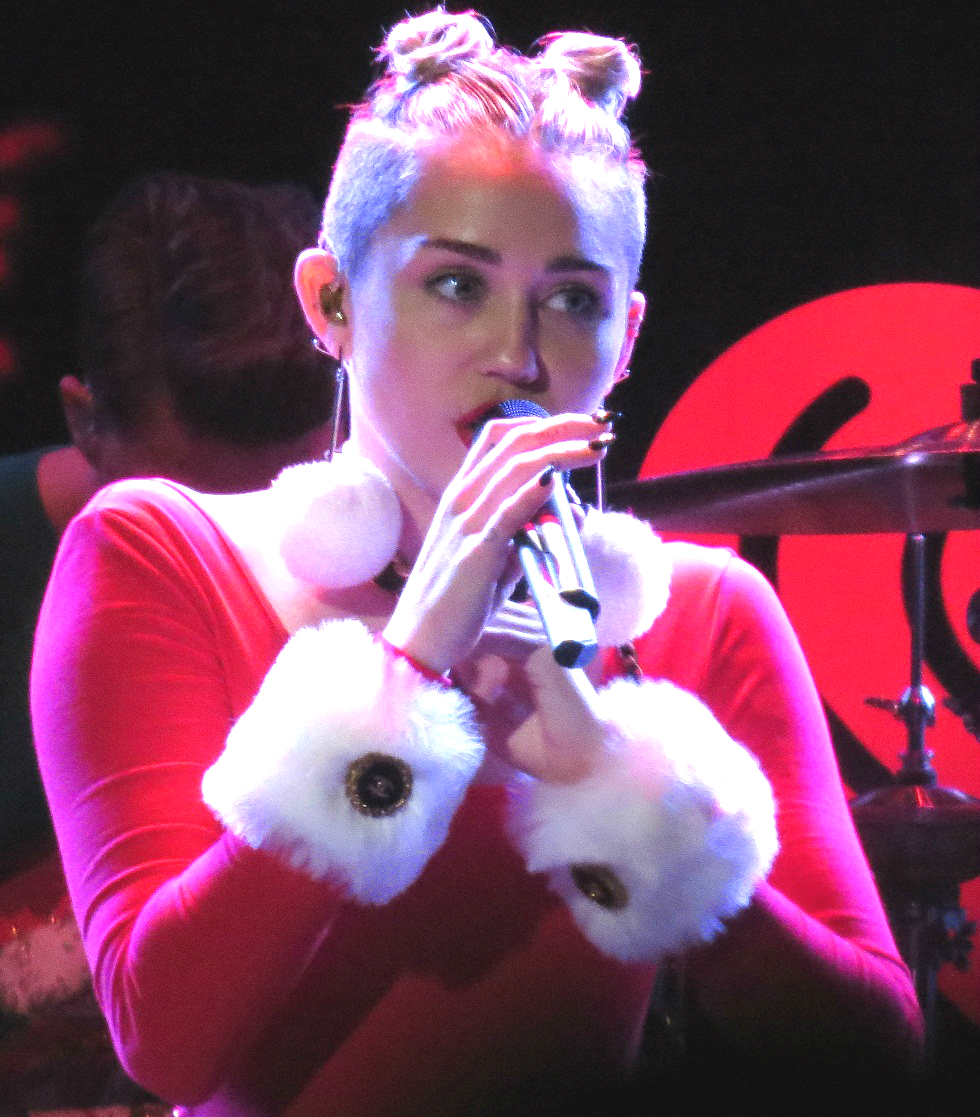
Critics were divided in their opinions of how Cyrus (pictured) responded to her critics on the documentary.

Miley: The Movement received generally mixed reviews from mainstream critics. Writing for E!, Bruna Nessif provided a favorable review; she opined that the documentary was "pretty entertaining" and reminded the general public that Cyrus "takes her job very seriously and still gets nervous." Andrew Asare from Entertainment Weekly felt that Cyrus' footage with her mother and Spears were among "her most candid moments", although noted the absences of her father and Hemsworth. Newsday's Glenn Gamboa gave a positive review, appreciating that Cyrus "surprises with her words, not her twerks." Elysa Gardner of USA Today opined that Cyrus appeared "good-humored and grateful to her fans" throughout the documentary, but questioned if her evolving image and public persona would become "yet another cautionary tale."

In a mixed review, Kia Makarechi from The Huffington Post was critical of the decision to avoid mentioning Hemsworth and toning-down of the criticism Cyrus received after the MTV Video Music Awards. She implied that MTV treated Cyrus like "an honest-to-god civil rights advocate", although felt that Spears' appearance was among the only "redeeming moments" of the documentary. Kate Dries from Jezebel suggested that frequent flashback footage of Cyrus' idols Madonna and Spears implied that MTV was "clearly proud" that all three women generated controversies at the MTV Video Music Awards in years past. Writing for Refinery29, Leila Brillson felt that "very little was clarified" by Miley: The Movement, and suggested that the documentary suffered from a lack of focus.

In its original broadcast in the United States on October 2, 2013, Miley: The Movement was watched by approximately 1.6 million viewers, and earned a 0.8 rating in the 18–49 demographic. An expanded version of the program with an additional thirty minutes of content was broadcast by MTV on October 6, 2013; it contained behind-the-scenes footage that was excluded from the original version, and expanded upon existing segments.
