= The Electrical Fire =

Background information
- Origin: Boston, Massachusetts, U.S.
- Genres: Electronic rock, indie rock
- Website: Official website

The Electrical Fire is an electronic rock project created by Anthony Barounis. Based in Boston, Massachusetts their debut album Don't They Know was released on May 29, 2012. They followed that up by scoring Barounis' feature documentary Ride Crazy: The Single Man March which was a regional hit, garnering attention from major publications, such as the Boston Globe. Their second album, Bubble Moon, was released on April 30, 2013 and is their first to feature original lyrics and vocals by Barounis.

In December, 2013, The Electrical Fire released Merry Christmas From The Electrical Fire, an EP of holiday-themed songs which included their version of Mariah Carey's All I Want for Christmas is You.

Barounis spent the next two years working with a variety of musicians and collaborators, eventually resulting in the release of Music by The Electrical Fire, Volume One, which was released on September 25, 2015 and features the singles "Always at Sunset" and "Snapshots".

== Collaborators ==
- Nat Simpkins, saxophone
- The Reverend Al Gaktapus
- Jakob White, guitar

== Discography ==
- Don't They Know LP, (May 29, 2012)
- Bubble Moon (LP, April 30, 2013)
- Merry Christmas From The Electrical Fire (EP, December 2013)
- "Always at Sunset" (Single, August 2015)
- "Snapshots" (Single, September 2015)
- Music by The Electrical Fire, Volume One (LP, September 25, 2015)
- Music by The Electrical Fire, Volume Two (LP, July 24, 2017)
