= Rebel Girl =

Rebel Girl may refer to:

- "Rebel Girl" (Angels & Airwaves song), 2019
- "Rebel Girl" (Bikini Kill song), 1993
- "Rebel Girl" (Survivor song), 1980
- "The Rebel Girl", a 1911 song by Joe Hill, written for Elizabeth Gurley Flynn
- Elizabeth Gurley Flynn (1890–1964), labor leader, activist, and feminist
- Rebel Girl, an EP by Endless Shame
- Rebel Girls, the children's book publisher and media company
