= Miley Cyrus discography =

Recordings by American singer

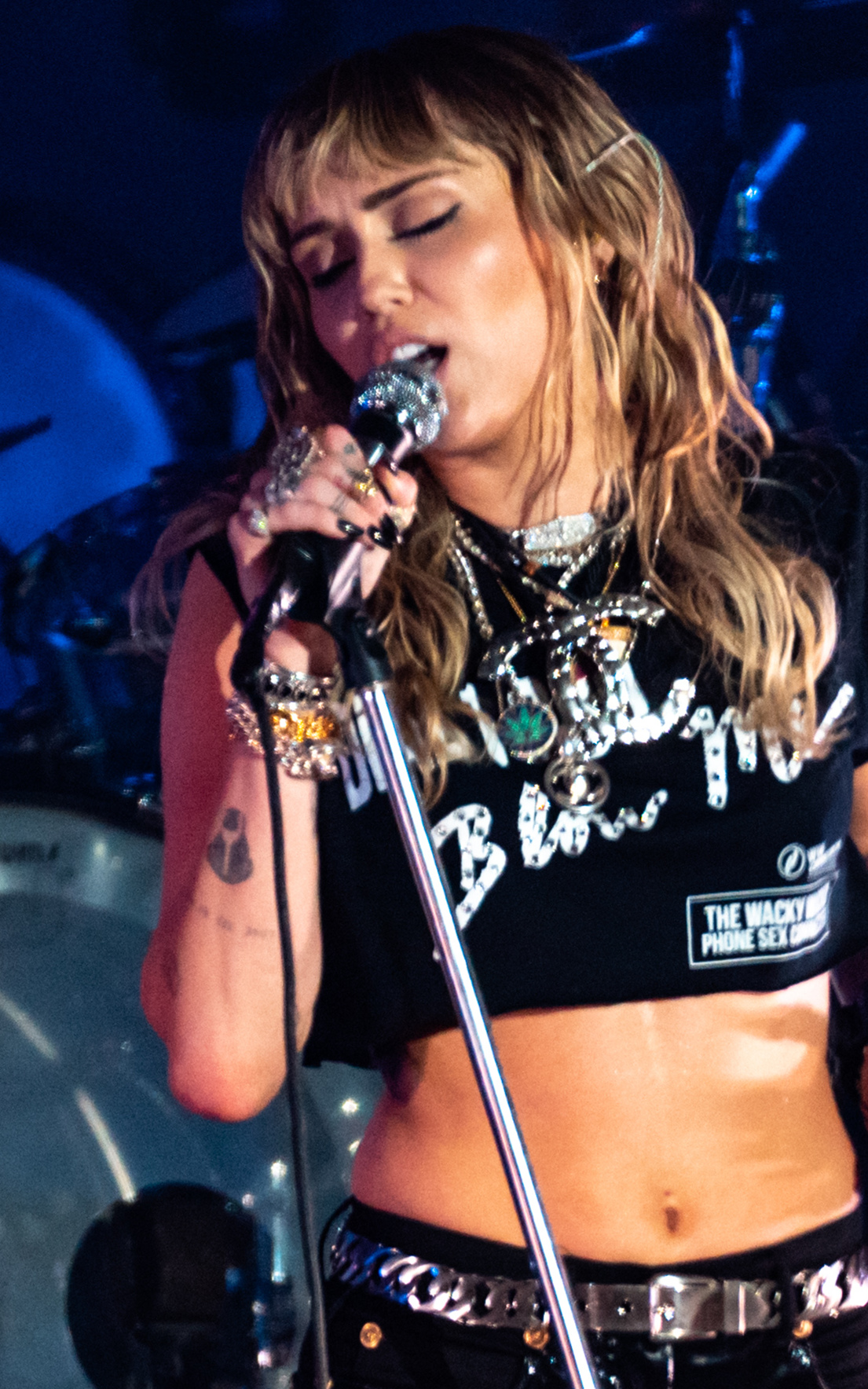
- Cyrus performing at Primavera Sound in Barcelona in 2019
- Studio albums: 10
- Extended plays: 4
- Live albums: 3
- Singles: 47
- Promotional singles: 19
- Charity singles: 6

American singer Miley Cyrus has released ten studio albums, three live albums, four extended plays and 47 singles. Popularly referred as the original "Teen Queen", Cyrus has sold 55 million singles and 20 million albums worldwide. According to Recording Industry Association of America, she has sold 32 million singles and 10 million albums in the US. Billboard ranked Cyrus as the ninth greatest Billboard 200 female music artist of all time and the 62nd greatest artist of all time.

Cyrus' first musical effort credited to the Hannah Montana character was on March 1, 2006, with the show's first soundtrack, which debuted at number one in the United States, and peaked in the top ten on the UK Compilations Chart. In June 2007, the series' second soundtrack and Cyrus' debut studio album were jointly released by Walt Disney and Hollywood Records, as the double album Hannah Montana 2: Meet Miley Cyrus, after Cyrus signed a four-album deal with the latter. The project reached number one in the United States. Its latter disc included the single "See You Again", which became Cyrus' first track to impact the top-ten in the United States, Australia, and Canada. On her debut live album Best of Both Worlds Concert, released in March 2008, Cyrus performed seven songs as herself and seven tracks as her title character Montana. The Hannah Montana: The Movie soundtrack peaked at number one in Austria, Canada, New Zealand, Spain, the U.S., and Turkey, and Hannah Montana 3 topped the Billboard Kid Albums and Soundtracks charts. The fifth and final soundtrack, was released on October 19, 2010, peaked at number 11 on the Billboard 200.

The singer's second studio album Breakout was released in July 2008, topping the United States, Australian, and Canadian charts. Its lead single "7 Things" reached the top 10 in the United States, Australia, and Norway. Cyrus' first extended play The Time of Our Lives followed in August 2009, and its track "Party in the U.S.A." made the top five in the United States, Canada, Ireland, and New Zealand. In that same year she released a live album titled iTunes Live from London. She released her third studio album Can't Be Tamed in June 2010, peaking within the top five in the United States, Australia, Austria, Canada, Germany, Ireland, Italy, and New Zealand. While the title track reached the top 10 in the United States, Canada, Ireland, and New Zealand, the album was less commercially successful than her past efforts.

Cyrus' fourth studio album Bangerz was released through RCA Records in October 2013, topping the United States, Australia, Canada, Ireland, Norway, and the United Kingdom charts. Its songs "We Can't Stop" and "Wrecking Ball" both reached the summit in the United Kingdom while former also topped the charts in New Zealand and the latter went number one in the United States and Canada. Her fifth album, Miley Cyrus & Her Dead Petz, was self-released via streaming in August 2015 and did not chart. She released her sixth album Younger Now in September 2017, which charted within the top five in the United States, Australia, Canada, Ireland, and New Zealand. Its lead single "Malibu" reached the top five in Australia, Canada, Norway, and New Zealand. In 2019, Cyrus released her fourth EP titled She Is Coming. In 2020, Cyrus released her seventh studio album Plastic Hearts, which spawned the top-twenty single "Midnight Sky". In 2023, she released Endless Summer Vacation, which featured her second number-one single "Flowers".

== Albums ==
=== Studio albums ===
List of albums, with selected chart positions and certifications
Title	Album details	Peak chart positions										Sales	Certifications
Title	Album details	US	AUS	AUT	CAN	GER	IRE	ITA	NOR	NZ	UK	Sales	Certifications
Meet Miley Cyrus	Released: June 26, 2007; Labels: Walt Disney, Hollywood; Formats: CD, digital download, LP, streaming	1	20	13	3	35	—	—	8	6	— (Note: Hannah Montana 2: Meet Miley Cyrus did not enter the UK Albums Chart, but peaked at number eight on the UK Compilation Chart.)		RIAA: 4× Platinum; ARIA: Platinum; BPI: Gold; MC: 2× Platinum; RMNZ: Platinum
Breakout	Released: July 22, 2008; Label: Hollywood; Formats: CD, digital download, LP, streaming	1	1	12	1	16	11	6	15	2	10		RIAA: 2× Platinum; ARIA: Platinum; BPI: Platinum; BVMI: Gold; IFPI AUT: Gold; IRMA: Platinum; RMNZ: 2× Platinum
Can't Be Tamed	Released: June 22, 2010; Label: Hollywood; Formats: CD, digital download, LP, streaming	3	4	2	2	4	5	4	8	2	8	US: 351,000	RIAA: Gold; ARIA: Gold; BPI: Silver; RMNZ: Gold
Bangerz	Released: October 8, 2013; Label: RCA; Formats: CD, digital download, LP, streaming	1	1	4	1	9	1	3	1	2	1	US: 1,100,000	RIAA: 3× Platinum; ARIA: Platinum; BPI: Gold; BVMI: Gold; FIMI: Gold; IFPI AUT: Gold; IFPI NOR: Platinum; MC: 2× Platinum; RMNZ: 3× Platinum
Miley Cyrus & Her Dead Petz	Released: August 30, 2015; Labels: Self-released (initial release), RCA (re-release); Formats: Digital download, streaming	―	―	―	―	―	―	―	―	―	―		
Younger Now	Released: September 29, 2017; Label: RCA; Formats: CD, digital download, LP, streaming	5	2	8	3	16	5	9	9	4	8	US: 33,000	RIAA: Gold; IFPI NOR: Platinum; MC: Gold; RMNZ: Platinum
Plastic Hearts	Released: November 27, 2020; Label: RCA; Formats: CD, digital download, LP, streaming	2	3	8	1	15	3	9	6	2	4	US: 20,000	ARIA: Gold; BPI: Gold; FIMI: Gold; IFPI NOR: Gold; RMNZ: Platinum
Endless Summer Vacation	Released: March 10, 2023; Label: Columbia; Formats: CD, digital download, LP, streaming	3	1	1	2	2	1	4	1	1	1	US: 55,000	RIAA: Platinum; BPI: Gold; MC: Platinum; RMNZ: Platinum
Something Beautiful	Released: May 30, 2025; Label: Columbia; Formats: CD, digital download, LP, streaming, box set	4	4	1	13	4	14	23	14	2	3	US: 27,000	
Bass Persuades	Released: September 18, 2026; Label: Atlantic; Formats: CD, digital download, LP, streaming	1	2	2	7	4	50	10	35	4	13	US: 47,000	
"—" denotes releases that did not chart or were not released.

=== Live albums ===
List of live albums, with selected chart positions and certifications
Title	Album details	Peak chart positions										Certifications
Title	Album details	US	AUS	AUT	BEL (FL)	BEL (WA)	CAN	GER	IRE	NZ	UK	Certifications
Best of Both Worlds Concert	Released: March 11, 2008; Labels: Walt Disney, Hollywood; Formats: CD, digital download, streaming	3	16	14	6	100	3	94	10	27	29	ARIA: Gold
Attention: Miley Live	Released: April 1, 2022; Label: Columbia; Formats: Digital download, streaming	— (Note: Attention: Miley Live did not enter the Billboard 200, but peaked at number 63 on the Current Albums Sales chart.)	—	—	151	—	—	—	98	—	— (Note: Attention: Miley Live did not enter the UK Albums Chart, but peaked at number five on the UK Album Downloads Chart.)	
"—" denotes releases that did not chart or were not released.

== Extended plays ==
List of extended plays, with selected chart positions and certifications
Title	Album details	Peak chart positions										Certifications
Title	Album details	US	AUS	AUT	CAN	GER	IRE	ITA	NOR	NZ	UK	Certifications
The Time of Our Lives	Released: August 28, 2009; Label: Hollywood; Formats: CD, digital download, LP, streaming	2	11	5	9	9	9	32	33	9	17	RIAA: 3× Platinum; ARIA: Gold; BPI: Gold; BVMI: Gold; IFPI AUT: Gold; IRMA: Platinum; RMNZ: 2× Platinum
iTunes Live from London	Released: May 12, 2009; Label: Hollywood; Formats: Digital download, streaming	—	—	—	—	—	—	—	—	—	—	
She Is Coming	Released: May 31, 2019; Label: RCA; Formats: Digital download, streaming	5	10	21	4	74	19	44	4	14	18	
Something Beautiful (Edits)	Released: August 8, 2025; Label: Columbia; Formats: Digital download, streaming	—	—	—	—	—	—	—	—	—	—	
"—" denotes releases that did not chart or were not released.

== Singles ==
=== As lead artist ===
==== 2000s ====
List of singles as lead artist, with selected chart positions and certifications, showing year released and album name
Title	Year	Peak chart positions										Certifications	Album
Title	Year	US	AUS	AUT	CAN	GER	IRE	NOR	NZ	SWE	UK	Certifications	Album
"Ready, Set, Don't Go" (with Billy Ray Cyrus)	2007	37	—	—	47	—	—	—	—	—	—		Home at Last
"See You Again"	2007	10	6	30	4	52	13	11	—	—	11	RIAA: 3× Platinum; ARIA: 3× Platinum; BPI: Gold; RMNZ: Platinum	Meet Miley Cyrus
"Start All Over"	2008	68	41	—	91	—	—	—	—	—	—	RIAA: Gold	Meet Miley Cyrus
"7 Things"	2008	9	10	14	13	17	26	8	24	—	25	RIAA: 2× Platinum; ARIA: 2× Platinum; BPI: Silver; RMNZ: Gold	Breakout
"Fly on the Wall"	2008	84	54	57	73	62	23	—	—	—	16	RIAA: Gold; ARIA: Gold	Breakout
"The Climb"	2009	4	5	30	5	41	11	5	12	40	11	RIAA: 7× Platinum; ARIA: 7× Platinum; BPI: Platinum; BVMI: Gold; MC: 3× Platinum; RMNZ: 3× Platinum	Hannah Montana: The Movie
"Party in the U.S.A."	2009	2	6	30	3	—	5	12	3	22	11	RIAA: 17× Platinum; ARIA: 14× Platinum; BPI: 3× Platinum; BVMI: Platinum; IFPI NOR: 3× Platinum; MC: 4× Platinum; RMNZ: 10× Platinum	The Time of Our Lives
"—" denotes releases that did not chart or were not released.

==== 2010s ====
List of singles as lead artist, with selected chart positions and certifications, showing year released and album name
Title	Year	Peak chart positions										Certifications	Album
Title	Year	US	AUS	AUT	CAN	GER	IRE	NOR	NZ	SWE	UK	Certifications	Album
"When I Look at You"	2010	16	19	57	24	85	45	—	27	— (Note: "When I Look at You" did not enter the Swedish Singellista Chart, but peaked at number one on the Swedish Heatseeker Chart.)	79	RIAA: 3× Platinum; ARIA: 3× Platinum; BPI: Gold; BVMI: Gold; IFPI NOR: Platinum; RMNZ: 2× Platinum	The Time of Our Lives
"Can't Be Tamed"	2010	8	14	21	6	29	5	15	5	42	13	RIAA: 2× Platinum; ARIA: 2× Platinum; BPI: Silver	Can't Be Tamed
"Who Owns My Heart"	2010	— (Note: "Who Owns My Heart" did not enter the Billboard Hot 100, but peaked at number 47 on the Streaming Songs chart.)	—	35	—	24	—	—	—	—	—	RIAA: Gold; ARIA: Gold	Can't Be Tamed
"We Can't Stop"	2013	2	4	8	3	16	7	3	1	5	1	RIAA: 8× Platinum; ARIA: 7× Platinum; BPI: 2× Platinum; BVMI: Gold; MC: 4× Platinum; GLF: 3× Platinum; IFPI AUT: Gold; IFPI NOR: 7× Platinum; RMNZ: 5× Platinum	Bangerz
"Wrecking Ball"	2013	1	2	2	1	6	2	2	2	3	1	RIAA: 9× Platinum; ARIA: 8× Platinum; BPI: 3× Platinum; BVMI: Platinum; GLF: 3× Platinum; IFPI AUT: Gold; IFPI NOR: 5× Platinum; MC: 4× Platinum; RMNZ: 3× Platinum	Bangerz
"Real and True" (with Future featuring Mr Hudson)	2013	— (Note: "Real and True" did not enter the Billboard Hot 100, but peaked at number three on the Bubbling Under Hot 100 chart.)	—	—	—	—	—	—	—	—	92	RIAA: Gold	Non-album single
"Adore You"	2013	21	25	—	36	—	—	—	15	—	27	RIAA: 3× Platinum; ARIA: 2× Platinum; BPI: Silver; IFPI NOR: Gold; MC: Platinum; RMNZ: Platinum	Bangerz
"Malibu"	2017	10	3	8	4	20	7	4	4	21	11	RIAA: 2× Platinum; ARIA: 6× Platinum; BPI: Platinum; BVMI: Gold; GLF: Platinum; IFPI AUT: Platinum; IFPI NOR: 4× Platinum; MC: 3× Platinum; RMNZ: 4× Platinum	Younger Now
"Younger Now"	2017	79	49	—	48	—	73	—	— (Note: "Younger Now" did not enter the NZ Top 40 Singles Chart, but peaked at number two on the NZ Heatseekers Singles Chart.)	75	54	ARIA: Gold; IFPI NOR: Gold; RMNZ: Gold	Younger Now
"Mother's Daughter"	2019	54	21	49	31	75	22	—	21	76	29	ARIA: 2× Platinum; BPI: Gold; MC: Platinum; RMNZ: Platinum	She Is Coming
"Slide Away"	2019	47	15	49	28	67	25	28	12	— (Note: "Slide Away" did not enter the Swedish Singellista Chart, but peaked at number one on the Swedish Heatseeker Chart.)	40	ARIA: 3× Platinum; BPI: Gold; IFPI NOR: Gold; MC: Gold; RMNZ: 2× Platinum	She Is Coming
"Don't Call Me Angel" (with Ariana Grande and Lana Del Rey)	2019	13	4	12	7	11	2	13	6	25	2	ARIA: Platinum; BPI: Gold; IFPI NOR: Gold; MC: Gold; RMNZ: Gold	Charlie's Angels
"—" denotes releases that did not chart or were not released.

==== 2020s ====
List of singles as lead artist, with selected chart positions and certifications, showing year released and album name
Title	Year	Peak chart positions										Certifications	Album
Title	Year	US	AUS	AUT	CAN	GER	IRE	NOR	NZ	SWE	UK	Certifications	Album
"Midnight Sky"	2020	14	7	33	8	27	4	25	27	31	5	RIAA: 2× Platinum; ARIA: 3× Platinum; BPI: 2× Platinum; BVMI: Gold; GLF: Platinum; IFPI AUT: Platinum; IFPI NOR: Platinum; RMNZ: 2× Platinum	Plastic Hearts
"Prisoner" (featuring Dua Lipa)	2020	54	13	15	17	20	5	11	24	23	8	RIAA: Platinum; ARIA: 2× Platinum; BPI: Platinum; BVMI: Gold; GLF: Gold; IFPI AUT: Platinum; IFPI NOR: Gold; MC: Gold; RMNZ: 2× Platinum	Plastic Hearts
"Angels like You"	2021	— (Note: "Angels like You" did not enter the Billboard Hot 100, but peaked at number seven on the Bubbling Under Hot 100 chart.)	92	—	55	—	43	—	— (Note: "Angels like You" did not enter the NZ Top 40 Singles Chart, but peaked at number one on the NZ Hot Singles Chart.)	—	66	RIAA: Platinum; ARIA: Gold; BPI: Silver; RMNZ: Platinum	Plastic Hearts
"Without You" (Remix) (with the Kid Laroi)	2021	8	—	—	—	—	—	—	—	10	—	ARIA: 8× Platinum; GLF: Platinum; IFPI NOR: 3× Platinum	Non-album single
"Flowers"	2023	1	1	1	1	1	1	1	1	1	1	RIAA: 7× Platinum; ARIA: 10× Platinum; BPI: 3× Platinum; BVMI: 2× Platinum; GLF: Platinum; FIMI: 4× Platinum; IFPI AUT: 3× Platinum; MC: Diamond; RMNZ: 7× Platinum	Endless Summer Vacation
"River"	2023	32	22	24	17	35	13	32	30	56	16	MC: Gold	Endless Summer Vacation
"Jaded"	2023	56	75	—	30	—	21	—	— (Note: "Jaded" did not enter the NZ Top 40 Singles Chart, but peaked at number two on the NZ Hot Singles Chart.)	—	27	RIAA: Gold; BPI: Silver; MC: Gold; RMNZ: Gold	Endless Summer Vacation
"Used to Be Young"	2023	8	13	29	8	53	7	12	12	23	12	RIAA: Platinum; ARIA: Gold; BPI: Silver; MC: Gold; RMNZ: Platinum	Endless Summer Vacation
"Doctor (Work It Out)" (with Pharrell Williams)	2024	74	— (Note: "Doctor (Work It Out)" did not enter the top 50 of the ARIA Singles Chart, but peaked at number 20 on the ARIA New Music Singles Chart.)	—	41	—	44	—	— (Note: "Doctor (Work It Out)" did not enter the NZ Top 40 Singles Chart, but peaked at number five on the NZ Hot Singles Chart.)	90	46		Non-album single
"II Most Wanted" (with Beyoncé)	2024	6	16	55	17	—	13	23	17	24	9	RIAA: Gold; BPI: Silver; MC: Gold	Cowboy Carter
"Psycho Killer"	2024	—	—	—	—	—	—	—	— (Note: "Psycho Killer" did not enter the NZ Top 40 Singles Chart, but peaked at number 16 on the NZ Hot Singles Chart.)	—	—		Everyone's Getting Involved
"End of the World"	2025	52	—	34	32	40	40	50	— (Note: "End of the World" did not enter the NZ Top 40 Singles Chart, but peaked at number 3 on the NZ Hot Singles Chart.)	59	23		Something Beautiful
"Easy Lover"	2025	82	—	—	60	—	57	—	— (Note: "Easy Lover" did not enter the NZ Top 40 Singles Chart, but peaked at number 5 on the NZ Hot Singles Chart.)	—	64		Something Beautiful
"Secrets" (featuring Lindsey Buckingham and Mick Fleetwood)	2025	—	—	—	—	—	—	—	— (Note: "Secrets" did not enter the NZ Top 40 Singles Chart, but peaked at number 16 on the NZ Hot Singles Chart.)	—	—		Something Beautiful (digital deluxe)
"Dream as One"	2025	—	—	—	—	—	—	—	—	—	—		Avatar: Fire and Ash
"Younger You"(from Hannah Montana 20th Anniversary Special)	2026	69	—	—	90	—	83	—	— (Note: "Younger You" did not enter the NZ Top 40 Singles Chart, but peaked at number 6 on the NZ Hot Singles Chart.)	—	53		Non-album single
"Bass Persuades"	2026	35	61	38	20	55	44	—	— (Note: "Bass Persuades" did not enter the NZ Top 40 Singles Chart, but peaked at number 3 on the NZ Hot Singles Chart.)	— (Note: "Bass Persuades" did not enter the Swedish Singellista Chart, but peaked at number eight on the Swedish Heatseeker Chart.)	31		Bass Persuades
"—" denotes releases that did not chart or were not released.

=== As featured artist ===
List of singles as featured artist, with selected chart positions and certifications, showing year released and album name
Title	Year	Peak chart positions										Certifications	Album
Title	Year	US	AUS	AUT	CAN	GER	IRE	ITA	NOR	NZ	UK	Certifications	Album
"Nothing to Lose" (Bret Michaels featuring Miley Cyrus)	2010	—	—	—	—	—	—	—	—	—	—		Custom Built
"Decisions" (Borgore featuring Miley Cyrus)	—	—	—	—	—	—	—	—	—	—		Newgoreorder	
"Ashtrays and Heartbreaks" (Snoop Lion featuring Miley Cyrus)	2013	—	—	—	—	—	—	—	—	—	—		Reincarnated
"Fall Down" (will.i.am featuring Miley Cyrus)	2013	58	14	45	15	48	17	93	—	15	34	ARIA: Platinum; GLF: Gold; RMNZ: Platinum	#willpower
"23" (Mike Will Made It featuring Miley Cyrus, Wiz Khalifa and Juicy J)	2013	11	39	—	26	—	—	56	—	26	85	RIAA: 4× Platinum; BVMI: Gold; RMNZ: Gold	Bangerz (Deluxe Version)
"Feelin' Myself" (will.i.am featuring Miley Cyrus, French Montana, Wiz Khalifa and DJ Mustard)	2013	96	34	—	—	55	—	83	—	16	2	BPI: Platinum; RMNZ: Platinum	#willpower
"Lucy in the Sky with Diamonds" (The Flaming Lips featuring Miley Cyrus and Moby)	2014	—	—	—	—	—	—	—	—	—	—		With a Little Help from My Fwends
"Come Get It Bae" (Pharrell Williams featuring Miley Cyrus)	2014	—	—	—	—	—	—	—	—	—	—		Girl
"Teardrop" (Lolawolf featuring Miley Cyrus)	2016	—	—	—	—	—	—	—	—	—	—		Non-album single
"We a Famly" (The Flaming Lips featuring Miley Cyrus)	2017	—	—	—	—	—	—	—	—	—	—		Oczy Mlody
"Nothing Breaks Like a Heart" (Mark Ronson featuring Miley Cyrus)	2018	43	6	24	19	16	2	33	19	11	2	RIAA: Platinum; ARIA: 6× Platinum; BPI: 2× Platinum; BVMI: Platinum; FIMI: Platinum; IFPI AUT: Gold; IFPI NOR: Platinum; MC: 2× Platinum; RMNZ: 3× Platinum	Late Night Feelings
"Wrecking Ball" (Dolly Parton featuring Miley Cyrus)	2023	—	—	—	—	—	—	—	—	—	—		Rockstar
"—" denotes releases that did not chart or were not released.

=== Promotional singles ===
List of promotional singles, with selected chart positions, showing year released and album name
Title	Year	Peak chart positions										Certifications	Album
Title	Year	US	AUS	AUT	CAN	GER	IRE	NOR	NZ	SWE	UK	Certifications	Album
"I Thought I Lost You" (with John Travolta)	2008	—	—	—	—	—	—	—	—	—	192		Bolt
"Hoedown Throwdown"	2009	18	20	41	15	66	10	17	40	—	18	RIAA: Platinum; ARIA: Platinum; BPI: Silver; RMNZ: Gold	Hannah Montana: The Movie
"We Belong to the Music" (Timbaland featuring Miley Cyrus)	2009	— (Note: "We Belong to the Music" did not enter the Billboard Hot 100, but peaked at number 11 on the Bubbling Under Hot 100 chart.)	—	—	63	—	—	—	—	—	—		Shock Value II
"Hands of Love"	2015	— (Note: "Hands of Love" did not enter the Billboard Hot 100, but peaked at number seven on the Bubbling Under Hot 100 chart.)	—	—	58	—	—	—	—	—	135		Freeheld (Original Motion Picture Soundtrack)
"Week Without You"	2017	—	—	—	— (Note: "Week Without You" did not enter the Canadian Hot 100, but peaked at number 49 on the Hot Canadian Digital Song Sales chart.)	—	—	—	— (Note: "Week Without You" did not enter the NZ Top 40 Singles Chart, but peaked at number eight on the NZ Heatseeker Singles Chart.)	—	—		Younger Now
"(Happy Xmas) War Is Over" (with Mark Ronson featuring Sean Lennon)	2018	— (Note: "Happy Xmas (War Is Over)" did not enter the Billboard Hot 100, but peaked at number 47 on the Digital Songs chart.)	—	—	— (Note: "Happy XMAS (War Is Over)" did not enter the Canadian Hot 100, but peaked at number 34 on the Hot Canadian Digital Song Sales chart.)	—	—	—	— (Note: "(Happy Xmas) War Is Over!" did not enter the NZ Top 40 Singles Chart, but peaked at number 10 on the NZ Hot Singles Chart.)	99	—		Non-album promotional singles
"On a Roll" (as Ashley O)	2019	— (Note: "On a Roll" did not enter the Billboard Hot 100, but peaked at number 16 on the Bubbling Under Hot 100 chart.)	86	—	77	—	35	—	— (Note: "On a Roll" did not enter the NZ Top 40 Singles Chart, but peaked at number 18 on the NZ Hot Singles Chart.)	—	65		Non-album promotional singles
"Heart of Glass" (live from the iHeartRadio Music Festival)	2020	— (Note: "Heart of Glass" did not enter the Billboard Hot 100, but peaked at number 24 on the Bubbling Under Hot 100 chart.)	81	—	86	—	17	—	— (Note: "Heart of Glass" did not enter the NZ Top 40 Singles Chart, but peaked at number 11 on the NZ Hot Singles Chart.)	—	38	RIAA: Gold; BPI: Silver; IFPI NOR: Gold; RMNZ: Gold	Plastic Hearts
"Zombie" (live from NIVA Save Our Stages Festival)	2020	— (Note: "Zombie" did not enter the Billboard Hot 100, but peaked at number 34 on the Digital Songs chart.)	—	—	—	—	79	—	—	—	— (Note: "Zombie" did not enter the UK Singles Chart, but peaked at number 85 on the UK Singles Sales Chart.)		Plastic Hearts
"Edge of Midnight (Midnight Sky Remix)" (featuring Stevie Nicks)	2020	—	—	—	—	—	—	—	—	—	—	RMNZ: Gold	Plastic Hearts
"I Got So High That I Saw Jesus" (Live version) (Noah Cyrus featuring Miley Cyrus)	2020	—	—	—	—	—	—	—	—	—	—		Non-album promotional single
"Nothing Else Matters" (featuring Watt, Elton John, Yo-Yo Ma, Robert Trujillo and Chad Smith)	2021	—	—	—	—	—	—	—	— (Note: "Nothing Else Matters" did not enter the NZ Top 40 Singles Chart, but peaked at number 26 on the NZ Hot Singles Chart.)	—	— (Note: "Nothing Else Matters" did not enter the UK Singles Chart, but peaked at number 29 on the UK Singles Sales Chart.)		The Metallica Blacklist and The Lockdown Sessions
"Prelude"	2025	—	—	—	—	—	—	—	—	—	—		Something Beautiful
"Something Beautiful"	2025	—	—	—	—	—	—	—	— (Note: "Something Beautiful" did not enter the NZ Top 40 Singles Chart, but peaked at number 20 on the NZ Hot Singles Chart.)	—	—		Something Beautiful
"More to Lose"	2025	— (Note: "More to Lose" did not enter the Billboard Hot 100, but peaked at number five on the Bubbling Under Hot 100 chart.)	—	—	90	—	—	—	— (Note: "More to Lose" did not enter the NZ Top 40 Singles Chart, but peaked at number 9 on the NZ Hot Singles Chart.)	— (Note: "More to Lose" did not enter the Swedish Singellista Chart, but peaked at number 10 on the Swedish Heatseeker Chart.)	91		Something Beautiful
"Walk of Fame" (featuring Brittany Howard)	2025	—	—	—	—	—	—	—	— (Note: "Walk of Fame" did not enter the NZ Top 40 Singles Chart, but peaked at number 16 on the NZ Hot Singles Chart.)	—	—		Something Beautiful
"Every Girl You've Ever Loved" (featuring Naomi Campbell)	2025	—	—	—	—	—	—	—	—	—	—		Something Beautiful
"Reborn"	2025	—	—	—	—	—	—	—	—	—	—		Something Beautiful
"Maybe It's"	2025	—	—	—	—	—	—	—	—	—	—		Non-album promotional single
"Different Religion" (featuring Model/Actriz)	2026	—	—	—	—	—	—	—	— (Note: "Different Religion" did not enter the NZ Top 40 Singles Chart, but peaked at number 22 on the NZ Hot Singles Chart.)	—	—		Bass Persuades
"Let's Get Married"	2026	99	—	—	—	—	—	—	— (Note: "Let's Get Married" did not enter the NZ Top 40 Singles Chart, but peaked at number 4 on the NZ Hot Singles Chart.)	—	—		Bass Persuades
"Cold Blooded (Demo)"	2026	—	—	—	—	—	—	—	—	—	—		Nobody Wants This: Season 3 (Soundtrack from the Netflix Series)
"You (Demo)"	2026	—	—	—	—	—	—	—	—	—	—		Nobody Wants This: Season 3 (Soundtrack from the Netflix Series)
"—" denotes releases that did not chart or were not released.

=== Charity singles ===
List of singles as lead artist, with selected chart positions and certifications, showing year released and album name
Title	Year	Peak chart positions										Notes
Title	Year	US	AUS	AUT	CAN	GER	IRE	ITA	NOR	NZ	UK	Notes
"Just Stand Up!" (among Artists Stand Up to Cancer)	2008	11	39	73	10	—	11	—	—	19	26	Release of a live performance with an all-female-ensemble of singers for Stand Up to Cancer.
"Send It On" (with Jonas Brothers, Demi Lovato and Selena Gomez)	2009	20	—	—	—	—	—	—	—	—	—	Released in order to benefit international environmental associations.
"Everybody Hurts" (among Helping Haiti)	2010	— (Note: "Everybody Hurts" did not enter the Billboard Hot 100, but peaked at number 21 on the Bubbling Under Hot 100 chart.)	28	23	59	16	1	—	—	17	1	Released in order to raise money for victims of the 2010 Haiti earthquake.
"We Are the World 25 for Haiti" (among Artists for Haiti)	2010	2	18	—	7	—	9	10	1	8	50	Released in order to raise money for victims of the 2010 Haiti earthquake.
"Inspired"	2017	—	97	—	—	—	—	—	—	—	— (Note: "Inspired" did not enter the UK Singles Chart, but peaked at number 35 on the UK Singles Sales Chart.)	A promotional single from Younger Now, Cyrus donated her personal profits from the song to her Happy Hippie Foundation, which deals with homelessness among LGBTQ youth.
"Earth" (among various artists)	2019	—	—	—	—	—	—	—	—	—	—	Released to raise awareness of environmental issues and support environmental causes.
"Light of a Clear Blue Morning" (Dolly Parton featuring Lainey Wilson, Queen Latifah, Miley Cyrus, and Reba McEntire)	2026	—	—	—	—	—	—	—	—	— (Note: "Light of a Clear Blue Morning" did not enter the NZ Top 40 Singles Chart, but peaked at number 39 on the NZ Hot Singles Sales Chart.)	—	Released to raise money for pediatric cancer research at the Monroe Carell Jr. Children's Hospital at Vanderbilt.
"—" denotes releases that did not chart or were not released.

== Other charted songs ==
List of songs, with selected chart positions, showing year released and album name
Title	Year	Peak chart positions										Certifications	Album
Title	Year	US	US Holiday Dig.	US Rock	AUS	CAN	IRE	NZ Hot	POR	UK	WW	Certifications	Album
"G.N.O. (Girl's Night Out)"	2007	91	—	—	—	—	—	—	—	—	—		Meet Miley Cyrus
"I Miss You"	2007	— (Note: "I Miss You" did not enter the Billboard Hot 100, but peaked at number nine on the Bubbling Under Hot 100 chart.)	—	—	—	—	—	—	—	—	—	RIAA: Gold	Meet Miley Cyrus
"Breakout"	2008	56	—	—	94	45	—	—	—	—	—		Breakout
"Girls Just Wanna Have Fun"	2008	— (Note: "Girls Just Wanna Have Fun" did not enter the Billboard Hot 100, but peaked at number 13 on the Bubbling Under Hot 100 chart.)	—	—	—	92	—	—	—	—	—		Breakout
"Goodbye"	2008	— (Note: "Goodbye" did not enter the Billboard Hot 100, but peaked at number 24 on the Bubbling Under Hot 100 chart.)	—	—	—	—	—	—	—	—	—		Breakout
"Butterfly Fly Away" (with Billy Ray Cyrus)	2009	56	—	—	56	50	46	—	—	78	—	RIAA: Platinum; ARIA: Platinum; BPI: Silver; RMNZ: Gold	Hannah Montana: The Movie
"The Time of Our Lives"	2009	— (Note: "The Time of Our Lives" did not enter the Billboard Hot 100, but peaked at number 23 on the Bubbling Under Hot 100 chart.)	—	—	—	51	—	—	—	—	—		The Time of Our Lives
"I Hope You Find It"	2010	— (Note: "I Hope You Find It" did not enter the Billboard Hot 100, but peaked at number five on the Bubbling Under Hot 100 chart.)	—	—	—	—	—	—	—	—	—		The Last Song
"Liberty Walk"	2010	— (Note: "Liberty Walk" did not enter the Billboard Hot 100, but peaked at number three on the Bubbling Under Hot 100 chart.)	—	—	—	79	—	—	—	—	—		Can't Be Tamed
"Stay"	2010	75	—	—	—	61	—	—	—	—	—	RIAA: Gold	Can't Be Tamed
"SMS (Bangerz)" (featuring Britney Spears)	2013	— (Note: "SMS (Bangerz)" did not enter the Billboard Hot 100, but peaked at number 10 on the Bubbling Under Hot 100 chart.)	—	—	—	—	—	—	—	157	—		Bangerz
"4x4" (featuring Nelly)	2013	—	—	—	—	— (Note: "4x4" did not enter the Canadian Hot 100, but peaked at number 64 on the Hot Canadian Digital Song Sales chart.)	—	—	—	—	—		Bangerz
"My Darlin'" (featuring Future)	2013	— (Note: "My Darlin'" did not enter the Billboard Hot 100, but peaked at number 12 on the Bubbling Under Hot 100 chart.)	—	—	—	80	—	—	—	—	—		Bangerz
"Drive"	2013	87	—	—	—	90	—	—	—	136	—		Bangerz
"FU" (featuring French Montana)	2013	— (Note: "FU" did not enter the Billboard Hot 100, but peaked at number one on the Bubbling Under Hot 100 chart.)	—	—	—	— (Note: "FU" did not enter the Canadian Hot 100, but peaked at number 53 on the Hot Canadian Digital Song Sales chart.)	—	—	—	—	—	RIAA: Gold	Bangerz
"Do My Thang"	2013	— (Note: "Do My Thang" did not enter the Billboard Hot 100, but peaked at number 23 on the Bubbling Under Hot 100 chart.)	—	—	—	—	—	—	—	—	—	RIAA: Platinum	Bangerz
"Maybe You're Right"	2013	— (Note: "Maybe You're Right" did not enter the Billboard Hot 100, but peaked at number six on the Bubbling Under Hot 100 chart.)	—	—	—	85	—	—	—	141	—		Bangerz
"Someone Else"	2013	93	—	—	—	97	—	—	—	172	—		Bangerz
"Hands in the Air" (featuring Ludacris)	2013	— (Note: "Hands in the Air" did not enter the Billboard Hot 100, but peaked at number 25 on the Bubbling Under Hot 100 chart.)	—	—	—	99	—	—	—	169	—		Bangerz
"Dooo It!"	2015	—	—	—	—	60	—	—	—	—	—		Miley Cyrus & Her Dead Petz
"BB Talk"	2015	—	—	—	—	86	—	—	—	—	—		Miley Cyrus & Her Dead Petz
"Unholy"	2019	— (Note: "Unholy" did not enter the Billboard Hot 100, but peaked at number 16 on the Bubbling Under Hot 100 chart.)	—	—	—	—	78	7	—	—	—		She Is Coming
"D.R.E.A.M." (featuring Ghostface Killah)	2019	— (Note: "D.R.E.A.M." did not enter the Billboard Hot 100, but peaked at number 11 on the Bubbling Under Hot 100 chart.)	—	—	—	—	77	9	—	—	—		She Is Coming
"The Most"	2019	—	—	—	—	—	—	13	—	—	—		She Is Coming
"Christmas Is" (Dolly Parton featuring Miley Cyrus)	2020	—	13	—	—	—	—	—	—	—	—		A Holly Dolly Christmas
"WTF Do I Know"	2020	—	—	13	—	—	—	6	—	—	—		Plastic Hearts
"Plastic Hearts"	2020	— (Note: "Plastic Hearts" did not enter the Billboard Hot 100, but peaked at number 11 on the Bubbling Under Hot 100 chart.)	—	8	—	85	48	4	—	96	174	RIAA: Gold; ARIA: Gold; BPI: Silver; RMNZ: Gold	Plastic Hearts
"Gimme What I Want"	2020	—	—	16	—	—	—	—	—	—	—		Plastic Hearts
"Night Crawling" (featuring Billy Idol)	2020	—	—	12	—	— (Note: "Night Crawling" did not enter the Canadian Hot 100, but peaked at number 29 on the Hot Canadian Digital Song Sales chart.)	—	—	—	—	—		Plastic Hearts
"High"	2020	—	—	18	—	—	—	—	—	—	—		Plastic Hearts
"Bad Karma" (featuring Joan Jett)	2020	—	—	19	—	—	—	—	—	—	—		Plastic Hearts
"Am I Dreaming" (Lil Nas X featuring Miley Cyrus)	2021	97	—	—	—	80	—	—	79	—	89		Montero
"Like a Prayer"	2022	— (Note: "Like a Prayer" did not enter the Billboard Hot 100, but peaked at number 41 on the Digital Songs chart.)	—	—	—	—	48	—	—	79	—		Attention: Miley Live
"Rose Colored Lenses"	2023	91	—	—	—	59	—	5	157	—	96		Endless Summer Vacation
"Thousand Miles" (featuring Brandi Carlile)	2023	68	—	—	—	65	—	6	197	— (Note: "Thousand Miles" did not enter the UK Singles Chart, but peaked at number 75 on the UK Singles Sales Chart.)	92		Endless Summer Vacation
"You"	2023	— (Note: "You" did not enter the Billboard Hot 100, but peaked at number three on the Bubbling Under Hot 100 chart.)	—	—	—	74	—	—	—	—	151		Endless Summer Vacation
"Handstand"	2023	— (Note: "Handstand" did not enter the Billboard Hot 100, but peaked at number 22 on the Bubbling Under Hot 100 chart.)	—	—	—	—	—	—	—	—	—		Endless Summer Vacation
"Violet Chemistry"	2023	— (Note: "Violet Chemistry" did not enter the Billboard Hot 100, but peaked at number 13 on the Bubbling Under Hot 100 chart.)	—	—	—	93	—	—	—	—	191		Endless Summer Vacation
"Muddy Feet" (featuring Sia)	2023	— (Note: "Muddy Feet" did not enter the Billboard Hot 100, but peaked at number nine on the Bubbling Under Hot 100 chart.)	—	—	—	81	—	—	—	—	163		Endless Summer Vacation
"Island"	2023	—	—	—	—	—	—	—	—	— (Note: "Island" did not enter the UK Singles Chart, but peaked at number 80 on the UK Singles Sales Chart.)	—		Endless Summer Vacation
"Golden Burning Sun"	2025	—	—	—	—	—	—	17	—	—	—		Something Beautiful
"Orbit"	2026	—	—	—	—	—	—	25	—	—	—		Bass Persuades
"—" denotes releases that did not chart or were not released in that territory.
