= Something Beautiful =

Something Beautiful may refer to:

== Albums ==
- Something Beautiful (Great Big Sea album) or the title song, 2004
- Something Beautiful (Jordan Smith album), 2016
- Something Beautiful (Miley Cyrus album), 2025
- Something Beautiful, by Ernie Haase & Signature Sound, 2020
- Something Beautiful, a video album by Gaither Homecoming, 1996

== Songs ==
- "Something Beautiful" (Robbie Williams song), 2003
- "Something Beautiful" (Miley Cyrus song), 2025
- "Something Beautiful", by Connie Stevens, 1965
- "Something Beautiful", by Detective, 1977
- "Something Beautiful", by Duffy, 2020
- "Something Beautiful", by the Equals, 1978
- "Something Beautiful", by Jars of Clay from The Eleventh Hour, 2002
- "Something Beautiful", by Needtobreathe from The Outsiders, 2009
- "Something Beautiful", by Newsboys from Go, 2006
- "Something Beautiful", by Todd Agnew from Reflection of Something, 2005
- "Something Beautiful", by Tracy Bonham from Blink the Brightest, 2005
- "Something Beautiful (To Remember)", by Slim Whitman, 1971
- "Something Beautiful", by Tom Walker featuring Masked Wolf, 2021

== Other uses ==
- Something Beautiful (film), a 2025 musical film and visual album by Miley Cyrus
- "Something Beautiful" (Better Call Saul), a television episode
- Something Beautiful, a 2008 photobook by Zhang Jingna
