= Easy Lover (Miley Cyrus song) =

2025 single by Miley Cyrus

Single by Miley Cyrus

from the album Something Beautiful
- Released: July 4, 2025
- Studio: The Village Recorder (Los Angeles, CA)
- Genre: Pop; pop rock; soft rock
- Length: 3:06
- Label: Columbia; Sony
- Songwriters: Miley Cyrus; Michael Pollack; Ryan Tedder; Omer Fedi
- Producers: Miley Cyrus; Shawn Everett; Michael Pollack; Jonathan Rado

Miley Cyrus singles chronology
| "End of the World" (2025) | "Easy Lover" (2025) | "Secrets" (2025) |

Music video
- "Easy Lover" on YouTube

"Easy Lover" is a song by the American singer Miley Cyrus from her ninth studio album, Something Beautiful (2025). Intended to be included on her own Plastic Hearts (2020) and Beyoncé's Cowboy Carter (2024), Cyrus kept the idea of "Easy Lover" for years and reimagined it for Something Beautiful. She was accompanied by the American musician Brittany Howard during the final conception of the song, and references her in the lyrics. "Easy Lover" is a pop, pop rock, and soft rock track with an up-tempo beat and lyrics about the emotions present in the end of a romantic relationship.

Cyrus wrote "Easy Lover" with Michael Pollack, Ryan Tedder, and Omer Fedi, and produced it with Pollack, Shawn Everett, and Jonathan Rado. It became available as the sixth track from Something Beautiful on May 30, 2025, when it was released by Columbia Records, and was sent to Italian radio by Sony Music on July 4, 2025, as the album's second single. Cyrus, Jacob Bixenman, and Brendan Walter directed the music video for "Easy Lover", which premiered in parallel to the album; the video follows the singer in a showgirl style, singing in a stage of a film studio. Cyrus has performed the song live at private events in the United States. Commercially, it has reached the top 60 in the national charts of Canada, Ireland, Panama, and Venezuela.

== Development ==
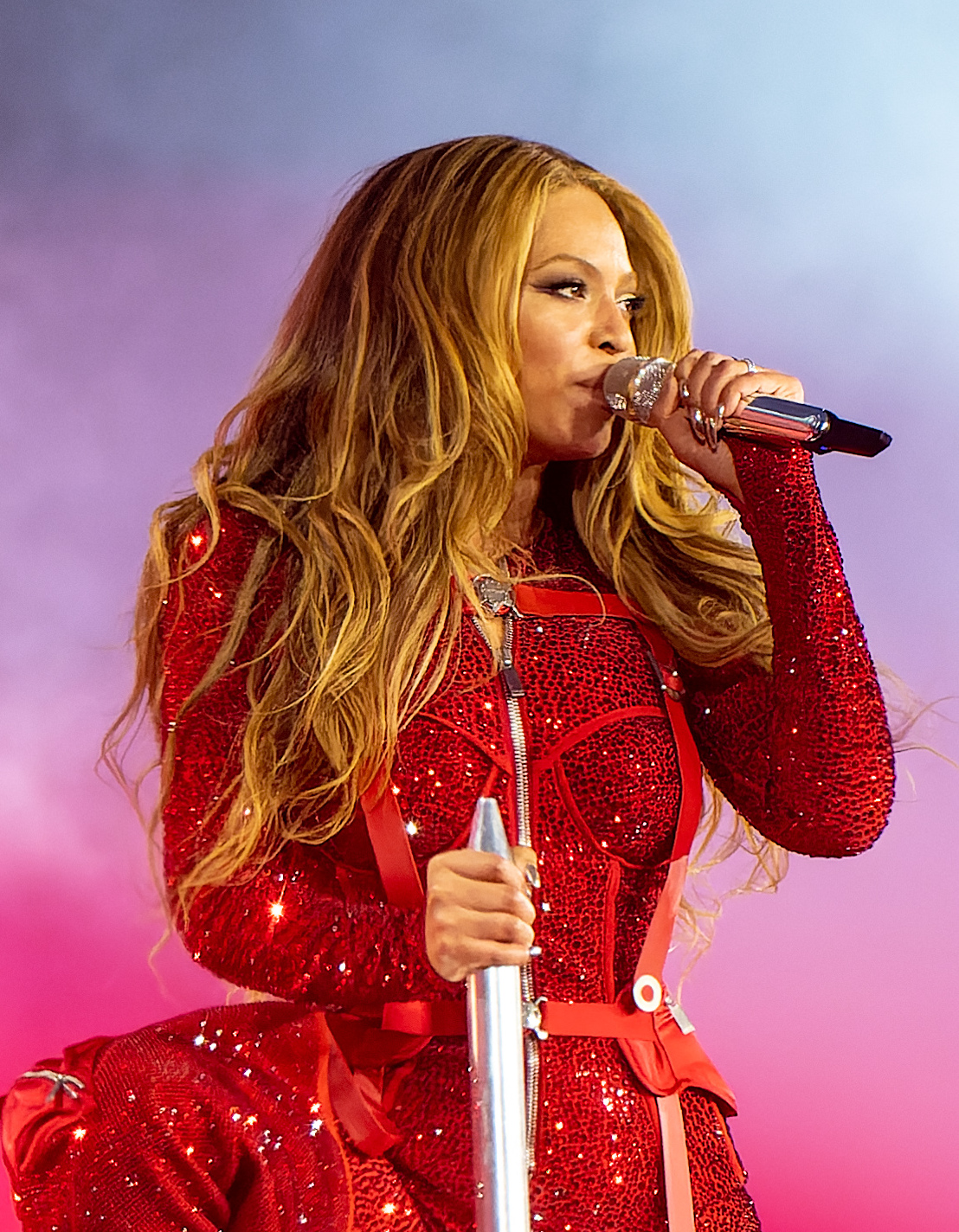
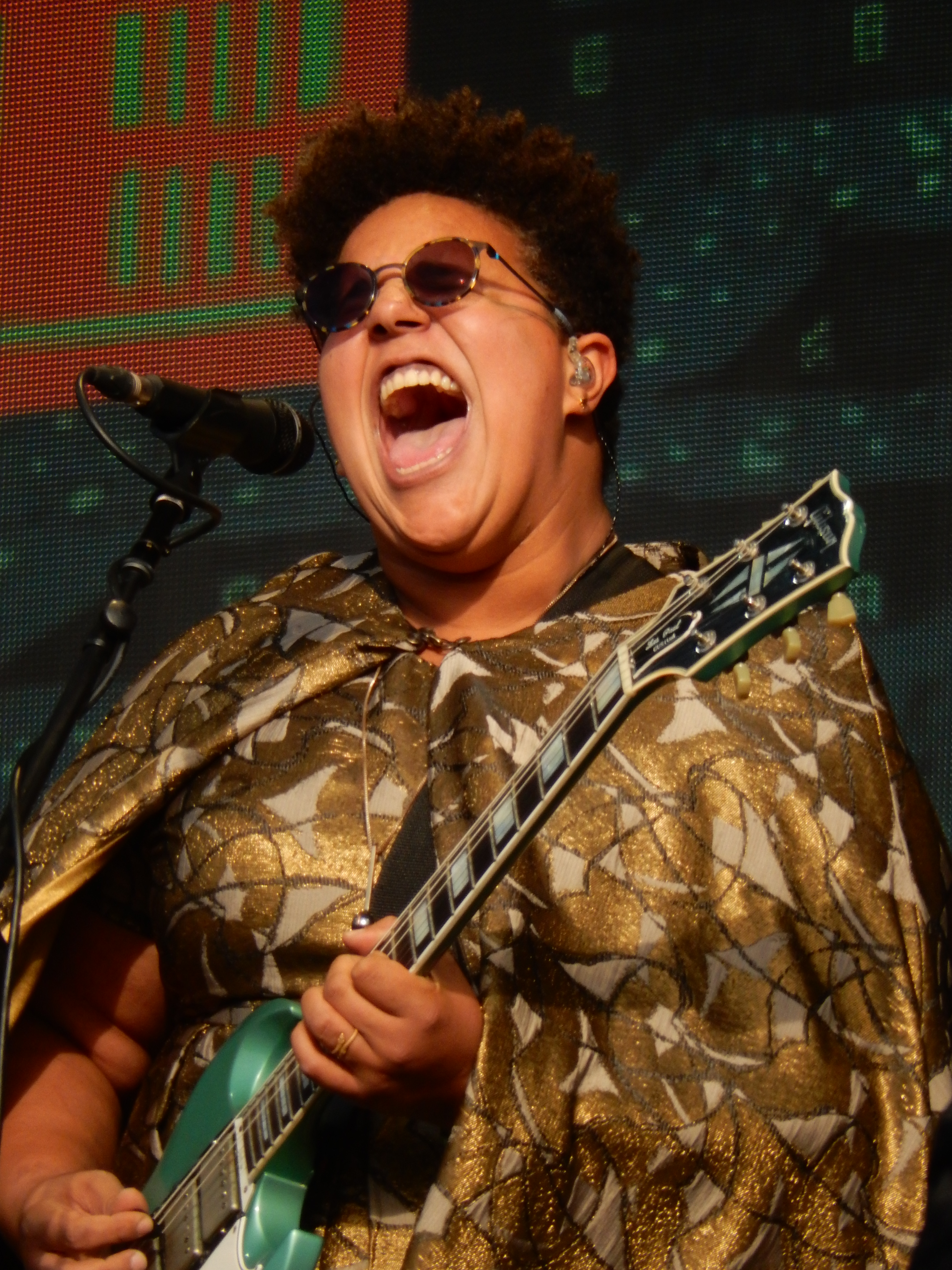
"Easy Lover" had an ad lib reference to the intended collaborator, Beyoncé (left), before it was redefined for Brittany Howard (right)

Cyrus originally wrote "Easy Lover" to include it on her rock-influenced album, Plastic Hearts (2020); as the song did not reach the sound she wanted, it was scrapped from the record. Years later, Cyrus was asked by the American singer and songwriter Beyoncé to collaborate on her country album Cowboy Carter (2024). She accepted and sent the demos of "Easy Lover" and "II Most Wanted"—originally titled "Shotgun Rider"—to Beyoncé. Cyrus added an ad lib saying "Tell 'em B" to the former song, in reference to Beyoncé, and believed that the chorus could be adapted to a country sound. "II Most Wanted" was ultimately chosen for Cowboy Carter.

Prior to the release of her ninth studio album, Something Beautiful (2025), Cyrus reimagined "Easy Lover" to include it on the release. During its conception, she was accompanied by the American musician Brittany Howard, who played electric guitar, and kept the aforementioned ad lib to reference Howard.

== Release and promotion ==
Cyrus announced the visual album Something Beautiful in March 2025, followed by the release of music videos as part of its promotion. On May 19, she revealed its track listing and shared a 23-second snippet of the sixth song, titled "Easy Lover". The song was previewed in other occasions, including as the background for the trailer of the accompanying music film for the album, also titled Something Beautiful (2025). Shortly before the album's release, Cyrus sang "Easy Lover" live during private events, including in a TikTok-hosted special set at the Chateau Marmont hotel and a fan celebration at the 3 Dollar Bill bar. Something Beautiful, including "Easy Lover", was released on May 30, 2025. A music video for "Easy Lover" premiered on the same date. Directed by Cyrus, Jacob Bixenman, and Brendan Walter, it stars the singer in a showgirl style, preparing her outfit, hair, and make-up in a dressing room, and later performing the track in a stage of a film studio. "Easy Lover" was sent to Italian radio by Sony Music on July 4, 2025, as the second single from Something Beautiful.

== Composition ==
Music critics categorized "Easy Lover" as a pop, pop rock, and soft rock song, with elements of blues, and country. It is built over an up-tempo beat, described by Billboard's Hannah Dailey as "groovy", and predominantly features bass and guitars. Several reviewers perceived similarities between the styles of "Easy Lover" and Cyrus's country-styled album Younger Now (2017). Rob Sheffield of Rolling Stone wrote that the song has a close to the "laid-back vibe" of the British-American rock band Fleetwood Mac. Other critics compared it to disco artists: Roisin O'Connor of The Independent found it reminiscent of the sound from the Swedish group ABBA, and Ed Power from The Irish Times compared it to the "disco-apocalypse energy" of the Jamaican singer Grace Jones.

As the album's sixth track, "Easy Lover" is separated by an interlude to "More to Lose", in which Cyrus shares her sadness and frustration throughout the end of a romantic relationship. On "Easy Lover", she is more driven by her anger and acceptance. Billboard's Lyndsey Havens wrote that the song's title has a double entendre; the critic believed that Cyrus is describing the partner as being difficult to love, and yet she does it easily.

== Reception ==
Havens named "Easy Lover" the third best song from Something Beautiful. It was named by Rolling Stone one of the best songs from its release week. Sal Cinquemani of Slant Magazine praised the song's chorus and said that it "begs [the listener] to sing along". O'Connor lauded the instrumental participation of Pino Palladino in bass and Sara Watkins in fiddle. In a negative album review, Madison Bloom of Pitchfork dubbed it "another Bruno Mars castoff" and described it as "referential, uninspired, and really just a rearrangement of pieces that don't quite fit in their new configuration".

Commercially, "Easy Lover" has reached the main charts in Ireland and the United Kingdom, peaking at numbers 57 and 64, respectively. It also appeared on the New Zealand Hot Singles secondary chart at number 5.

== Personnel ==
The personnel is adapted from the liner notes of Something Beautiful.

- Miley Cyrus – vocals, writer, producer
- Michael Pollack – writer, producer, stomps, Wurlitzer 200a
- Ryan Tedder – writer
- Omer Fedi – writer
- Shawn Everett – producer, engineer, vocal engineer, stomps, string synthesizers, programmer, sound effects, Foley
- Jonathan Rado – producer, guitar, stomps, sound effects, Foley
- Ian Gold – engineer, stomps, background vocal effects, sound effects, Foley
- Pièce Eatah – engineer, vocal engineer, sound effects, Foley
- JC LeResche – assistant engineer, tape operator
- Tim Reitnouer – fiddle engineer
- Justin Brown – drums
- Pino Palladino – bass
- Sara Watkins – fiddle
- Matt Pynn – pedal steel guitar
- Brittany Howard – electric guitar
- Bronte Araghi – background vocal effects

== Charts ==
=== Weekly charts ===
Weekly chart performance
| Chart (2025–2026) | Peak position |
|---|---|
| Argentina Anglo Airplay (Monitor Latino) | 2 |
| Bolivia Airplay (Monitor Latino) | 14 |
| Canada Hot 100 (Billboard) | 60 |
| Central America Anglo Airplay (Monitor Latino) | 10 |
| Chile Airplay (Monitor Latino) | 15 |
| Colombia Anglo Airplay (Monitor Latino) | 12 |
| Costa Rica Anglo Airplay (Monitor Latino) | 9 |
| Croatia International Airplay (Top lista) | 40 |
| Dominican Republic Anglo Airplay (Monitor Latino) | 2 |
| Ecuador Anglo Airplay (Monitor Latino) | 6 |
| Estonia Airplay (TopHit) | 52 |
| Global 200 (Billboard) | 79 |
| Greece International (IFPI) | 65 |
| Guatemala Anglo Airplay (Monitor Latino) | 6 |
| Israel International Airplay (Media Forest) | 10 |
| Italy Airplay (EarOne) | 14 |
| Ireland (IRMA) | 57 |
| Japan Hot Overseas (Billboard Japan) | 12 |
| Latin America Anglo Airplay (Monitor Latino) | 9 |
| Latvia Airplay (LaIPA) | 8 |
| Lithuania Airplay (TopHit) | 44 |
| Mexico Anglo Airplay (Monitor Latino) | 15 |
| New Zealand Hot Singles (RMNZ) | 5 |
| Nicaragua Anglo Airplay (Monitor Latino) | 6 |
| Panama International (PRODUCE) | 44 |
| Panama Anglo Airplay (Monitor Latino) | 5 |
| Paraguay Airplay (Monitor Latino) | 13 |
| Peru Airplay (Monitor Latino) | 16 |
| Portugal (AFP) | 158 |
| Romania Airplay (TopHit) | 169 |
| San Marino Airplay (SMRTV Top 50) | 3 |
| Slovakia Airplay (ČNS IFPI) | 32 |
| Suriname (Nationale Top 40) | 10 |
| UK Singles (OCC) | 64 |
| Uruguay Anglo Airplay (Monitor Latino) | 3 |
| US Billboard Hot 100 | 82 |
| Venezuela Airplay (Record Report) | 44 |

=== Monthly charts ===
Monthly chart performance
| Chart (2025) | Peak position |
|---|---|
| Estonia Airplay (TopHit) | 60 |
| Lithuania Airplay (TopHit) | 54 |

=== Year-end charts ===
Year-end chart performance
| Chart (2025) | Position |
|---|---|
| Argentina Anglo Airplay (Monitor Latino) | 19 |
| Chile Airplay (Monitor Latino) | 89 |
| Lithuania Airplay (TopHit) | 151 |
