= Something Beautiful (film) =

2025 film and visual album by Miley Cyrus

- Promotional poster
- Directed by: Miley Cyrus; Jacob Bixenman; Brendan Walter
- Written by: Miley Cyrus; Brendan Walter; Jacob Bixenman
- Produced by: Miley Cyrus; Panos Cosmatos; Nick Spicer; Nate Bolotin; Aram Tertzakian
- Starring: Miley Cyrus; Naomi Campbell; Brittany Howard; Maxx Morando
- Cinematography: Benoît Debie
- Edited by: Brendan Walter
- Music by: Miley Cyrus; Shawn Everett; Michael Pollack; Jonathan Rado; Maxx Morando
- Production companies: Hopetown Entertainment; Crush Music; Columbia Records; Sony Music Vision; Live Nation Entertainment; XYZ Films
- Distributed by: Trafalgar Releasing; Sony Music Vision
- Release dates: June 6, 2025 (Tribeca Festival); June 12, 2025 (United States)
- Running time: 55 minutes
- Country: United States
- Language: English

Something Beautiful is a musical film and visual album by American singer Miley Cyrus, and serves as a visual companion to her ninth studio album, Something Beautiful (2025). Written and directed by Cyrus, Jacob Bixenman and Brendan Walter, it was produced by Columbia Records, Sony Music Vision, Live Nation Entertainment and XYZ Films. It premiered on June 6, 2025, at the Tribeca Festival, and released theatrically on June 12.

== Summary ==
=== Act 1 ===
As images of flowers flash onscreen, Miley Cyrus narrates a poem describing her existential thoughts and ideas of small pieces of beauty in passing moments ("Prelude"). She then performs on a stage as it crumbles and explodes around her and the band ("Something Beautiful"). She performs again in a shimmering, green dress, singing about how she would spend the moments before the world's end with her lover while her boyfriend, Maxx Morando, plays the drums beside her ("End of the World"). In black-and-white, she tearfully sings a ballad describing a tragic breakup while wearing a glittering bodysuit in one scene and a black suit that covers the top half of her face in another ("More to Lose"). Cyrus then struts through a series of dark hallways and into a dressing room, where she removes the black getup, and changes into a bright teal country showgirl outfit, then exiting to a studio lot. She dances through the lot and into a soundstage as she sings about a lover of hers that she cannot stand yet cannot live without ("Interlude 1"/"Easy Lover").

=== Act 2 ===
As lights flash in the soundstage, Cyrus's dancers remove her clothing and she changes into an all-leather outfit. They dance before Cyrus hops onto a motorcycle and drives down a long highway behind bright red lights with a ginormous, orange sun setting behind her. She sings about a mysterious lover that she feels is the only one she is capable of truly loving ("Interlude 2"/"Golden Burning Sun"). Arriving at a shady back alley, Cyrus walks into and through the streets of Hollywood at night, almost completely alone except for a brief encounter with Morando. She dances and crawls around the Walk of Fame, lamenting about the inescapable nature of stardom, as Brittany Howard appears and tells her that her image will live forever ("Walk of Fame"). Caught in a heavy storm with lights flashing around her, Cyrus screams about being haunted by the feeling that her current lover doesn't care for her anymore, and that she is willing to do anything to make them love her again ("Pretend You're God"). In a New York warehouse, she struts and poses, saying that she is everything any man could want, yet her current lover avoids commitment. She goes toe-to-toe with supermodel Naomi Campbell, who sings a series of praises for Cyrus ("Every Girl You've Ever Loved"). On a CRT monitor, Cyrus sings about rebirth by way of ego death and love while dressed in a tiny two-piece black bikini with three liberty spikes atop her head, as a man thrashes around in a different room. She then encounters Morando once again, who she kisses and lies in bed with before he departs and she is left alone ("Reborn").

== Background and production ==
In November 2024, through an interview with Harper's Bazaar, Cyrus announced she was working on a new album titled Something Beautiful (2025) in collaboration with Panos Cosmatos. Inspired by Pink Floyd's The Wall (1979), she described the record as a visual album that centers around the theme of "healing". She initially planned to hold a series of intimate performances of the album in "visually pleasing spaces" like forests, but she abandoned the idea in favor of the visual film. Speaking to Zane Lowe for Apple Music, she described the film as her "way of touring". Cyrus began teasing her upcoming album on March 17, 2025, by updating her visuals on social media and her website as well as teasing the project through posters around the world. The singer announced the album and film on March 24, teasing the film's theatrical release on June and describing it as "a unique visual experience fueled by fantasy" and "one of a kind pop opera".

The film was produced by Cyrus' record label Columbia Records, Sony Music Vision, Live Nation Entertainment and XYZ Films. It was written and directed by Cyrus, Jacob Bixenman and Brendan Walter and produced by Cyrus, Panos Cosmatos, Nick Spicer, Nate Bolotin and Aram Tertzakian. Its executive producers are Adam Folk, Columbia Records CEO Ron Perry, Sony Music executive Tom Mackay, Krista Wegener, Live Nation CEO Michael Rapino, and Live Nation executives Brad Wavra and Ryan Kroft. Benoît Debie served as its cinematographer.

== Release and promotion ==
On March 25, 2025, the film's trailer was released. Its excerpts were released, serving as music videos for the album's songs. On March 31, 2025, the visual videos for "Prelude" and "Something Beautiful" were released. The videos for "End of the World", "More to Lose" and "Easy Lover" were released on April 3, May 9 and May 30, respectively. Spotify hosted "An Evening with Miley Cyrus" album listening and film screening event for a limited number of fans in New York City on May 6, 2025. The second trailer was released on May 22, 2025.

The film premiered on June 6, 2025, at the Beacon Theatre in New York City, during the Tribeca Festival. It was distributed theatrically by Trafalgar Releasing and Sony Music Vision and shown for one night only, on June 12, in the United States and Canada. Another limited one-night engagement took place internationally on June 27. It released on Disney+ and Hulu on July 16 in the United States and Canada, and was followed by an international release on July 30. On July 31, 2026, the film was released for free in its entirety on Cyrus' YouTube channel.

== Reception ==
=== Critical response ===
Variety's Owen Gleiberman wrote that "Cyrus struts and pouts and lets it all out, she throws her body around like a gymnastic weapon, and in a way she throws her beauty around, as though she were trying to sear the power of her erotic presence into our souls". According to The Guardian's Alexis Petridis, "it has absolutely no plot, not because it's a wilfully confusing exercise in non-linear arthouse cinema, but because it's just a load of pop videos, albeit divided into three "acts" and interspersed with spoken-word interludes. A lot of them are straightforward in-studio performances; the rest look like extended perfume commercials...". Mary Kassel of Screen Rant acknowledged that Something Beautiful is a well-made project that reflects Miley Cyrus' commitment to her art, but criticized it for lacking "perspective or purpose". While the film is "fun" and technically solid, she felt it lacked engaging ideas or memorable moments, ultimately concluding that it "won't make much of an impact." Pavel Snapkou from Showbiz by PS praised Cyrus's ambition but said that Something Beautiful "ends up being either a very low-budget music film or a relatively expensive full-length visualizer."

=== Accolades ===
Year	Award	Category	Nominee(s)	Result	Ref.
2025	MTV Video Music Awards	Best Long Form Video	Miley Cyrus	Nominated	
2026	Art Directors Guild Awards	Best Variety Special - Film	Something Beautiful	Nominated	
