= Something Beautiful (Miley Cyrus song) =

Promotional single by Miley Cyrus

from the album Something Beautiful
- Released: March 31, 2025
- Genre: Jazz; psychedelic pop
- Length: 4:31
- Label: Columbia
- Songwriters: Max Taylor-Sheppard; Maxx Morando; Michael Pollack; Miley Cyrus; Ryan Beatty
- Producers: Jonathan Rado; Max Taylor-Sheppard; Maxx Morando; Michael Pollack; Miley Cyrus; Shawn Everett

Music video
- "Something Beautiful" on YouTube

"Something Beautiful" is the a 2025 song by Miley Cyrus and the title track of her 9th studio album, Something Beautiful.

== Background ==
In November 2024, Cyrus revealed in an interview with Harper's Bazaar that she was working on a new album titled Something Beautiful. Drawing inspiration from Pink Floyd's 1979 concept album The Wall, Cyrus described the project as a visual album centered around the theme of healing. She began teasing the album on March 17, 2025, through updated visuals on social media and her website, as well as global poster campaigns. The album was officially announced on March 24. On March 31, 2025, the song "Something Beautiful" was released alongside a visual video for the track "Prelude", which premiered on her YouTube channel.

== Composition ==
Cyrus co-produced the song with Panos Cosmatos, Nick Spicer, Nate Bolotin, and Aram Tertzakian.

Pitchfork described "Something Beautiful" as a "jazzy, psych-pop-infused" song. Variety said the song has "a psych-pop chorus that builds". Stereogum said the song "starts out as a lush, slinky ballad before exploding into jagged power chords and noisy sax blurts. When the chorus comes in, Cyrus switches from a bold, brassy delivery to a distorted squeak".

== Music video ==
The song's music video was directed by Cyrus, Jacob Bixenman, and Brendan Walter. Cinematography is by Benoît Debie. Variety called the video "elegant". The video sees Cyrus "marching into a warehouse in a furry green jacket and singing over a slinky bass line". Stereogum said she "strikes rock-star poses" in the video.
