= Walk of Fame (song) =

2025 song by Miley Cyrus

Promotional single by Miley Cyrus featuring Brittany Howard

from the album Something Beautiful
- B-side: "Reborn" (edit)
- Released: May 30, 2025
- Genre: Synth-pop; dance-pop; disco; art pop
- Length: 6:00 (album version); 3:37 (edit)
- Label: Columbia
- Songwriters: Miley Cyrus; Maxx Morando; Michael Pollack; Shawn Everett; Brittany Howard; Jonathan Rado
- Producers: Cyrus; Everett; Pollack; Rado; Morando

"Walk of Fame" is a song by American singer Miley Cyrus featuring American musician Brittany Howard, from Cyrus's ninth studio album, Something Beautiful (2025). An edit version of the song was released on May 28, 2025, two days before the album. Cyrus, Maxx Morando, Michael Pollack, Shawn Everett, Howard, and Jonathan Rado wrote the song. Cyrus, Everett, Pollack, Rado, and Morando produced it, with additional production by Howard.

== Background and release ==
Cyrus announced Something Beautiful, her ninth studio album, in March 2025. It was promoted as a visual album inspired in part by Pink Floyd's The Wall, with a companion film directed by Cyrus, Jacob Bixenman, and Brendan Walter. Glen Luchford photographed the album artwork, which shows Cyrus wearing archival 1997 Thierry Mugler couture.

Before the album's release, Cyrus previewed the project with the songs "Prelude", "Something Beautiful", "End of the World", and "More to Lose". The album's track listing, revealed in May 2025, listed "Walk of Fame" as one of its two featured collaborations, alongside "Every Girl You've Ever Loved" with Naomi Campbell. "Walk of Fame" was written by Cyrus, Maxx Morando, Michael Pollack, Shawn Everett, Howard, and Jonathan Rado.

An edited version of "Walk of Fame" was released as a promotional single coinciding with the album, and later included on a 7-inch vinyl with an edited version of "Reborn" on November 14, 2025. The full album version was released with Something Beautiful.

"Walk of Fame" was featured in the 2026 film The Devil Wears Prada 2 and its soundtrack. Paper ranked "Walk of Fame" fifth on its list of the film's needle drops, writing that the song fit with the soundtrack's pop selections.

== Composition ==
"Walk of Fame" is a dance-pop song with rock, disco, and electropop influences. Writing for Bustle, Jake Viswanath described it as a "dance anthem". Lyrically, "Walk of Fame" uses images of performance, public attention, and walking away to explore fame, emotional conflict, and self-mythologizing.

Several reviews discussed "Walk of Fame" in the context of the album's broader dance-oriented sound. Riff Magazine called the song "unexpected and modern-sounding" in its review of the album. Rock The Joint Magazine wrote that the track returned the album to the dance floor, comparing its feel to The Communards and noting its keyboard-pop arrangement and energetic drum sound. In a broader review of Something Beautiful, The Guardian said the album's second half drew on hi-NRG and mid-1980s club music, singling out "Walk of Fame" as part of that stylistic turn. Bustle interpreted the song as partly addressing a breakup, noting that Cyrus sings about leaving despite being asked to stay.

The album version of the song runs for six minutes, while the edit version runs for three minutes and thirty-seven seconds. Howard contributes vocals and electric guitar to the track, and Danielle Haim also plays electric guitar. Additional instrumentation includes clavinet by Money Mark and Syndrum and Vermona DRM-1 by Jay Rudolph.

== Critical reception ==
Critical response to "Walk of Fame" was mixed. In a negative review of Something Beautiful, Pitchfork criticized the song's disco production and self-mythologizing tone, as well as Howard's outro. The review grouped "Walk of Fame" with "Every Girl You've Ever Loved" as examples of what it considered the album's weaker pop material, arguing that the track's guest musicians could not rescue its concept.

Other critics responded more favorably to the same elements. Anthony Fantano of The Needle Drop described the song as a "six-minute monster" and highlighted its shifting production and climactic vocal passages. The Guardian also noted the song in the album's second half, comparing its melodic style to a Eurovision finalist and praising Howard's vocal contribution as a forceful, Grace Jones-like presence.

== Music video ==
Cyrus lying on Arnold Schwarzenegger's Hollywood Walk of Fame star in the music video for "Walk of Fame"

The official music video for "Walk of Fame" was uploaded to Cyrus's official YouTube channel on July 18, 2025. It runs for approximately six minutes and functions as the song's sequence in the Something Beautiful visual album. The film was directed and written by Cyrus, Jacob Bixenman, and Brendan Walter. The visual album premiered at the Tribeca Festival on June 6, 2025, and was later released on Disney+ and Hulu in July 2025.

The video is set on the Hollywood Walk of Fame, and shows Cyrus performing on the sidewalk at night, crawling and moving across the stars as the camera emphasizes the glare, texture, and tourist-iconography of Hollywood Boulevard. Brittany Howard also appears in the video, reflecting her featured vocal and guitar contribution to the track.

During a May 2025 appearance on Jimmy Kimmel Live!, Cyrus said that after filming the video on the Hollywood Walk of Fame in October 2024, she developed an infection around her kneecap that resulted in a brief hospitalization in the ICU. She described filming at night on the unsanitized sidewalk and later telling doctors that she had been rolling on the ground during production.

The video's setting gained additional notice in July 2025, when Cyrus was announced as part of the Hollywood Walk of Fame's 2026 class. She responded to the announcement by sharing footage from the "Walk of Fame" video and writing about childhood visits to Hollywood Boulevard with her father, Billy Ray Cyrus.

== Track listing ==
- Urban Outfitters limited edition 7-inch vinyl
1. "Walk of Fame" (edit) – 3:37
2. "Reborn" (edit) – 3:58

== Credits and personnel ==
Credits adapted from Pitchfork.

Musicians

- Miley Cyrus – vocals, songwriting, production
- Brittany Howard – featured vocals, electric guitar, songwriting, additional production
- Danielle Haim – electric guitar
- Money Mark – clavinet
- Jay Rudolph – Syndrum, Vermona DRM-1
- Maxx Morando – songwriting, production
- Michael Pollack – songwriting, production
- Shawn Everett – songwriting, production
- Jonathan Rado – songwriting, production

Technical

- Shawn Everett – engineering, vocal engineering
- Ian Gold – engineering, vocal engineering
- Ivan Wayman – engineering
- Pièce Eatah – engineering, vocal engineering
- JC LeResche – assistant engineering, tape operator
- JC Chiam – assistant engineering
