= Secrets (Miley Cyrus song) =

2025 single by Miley Cyrus

Single by Miley Cyrus featuring Lindsey Buckingham and Mick Fleetwood

from the album Something Beautiful (deluxe)
- Released: September 18, 2025
- Length: 3:49
- Label: Columbia
- Songwriters: Miley Cyrus; Gregory Aldae Hein; Tyler Johnson; Jonathan Rado; Michael Pollack; Shawn Everett
- Producers: Miley Cyrus; Jonathan Rado; Michael Pollack; Shawn Everett

Miley Cyrus singles chronology
"Easy Lover" (2025)	"Secrets" (2025)	"Dream as One" (2025)

Lindsey Buckingham singles chronology
"Scream" (2021)	"Secrets" (2025)

Mick Fleetwood singles chronology
"Need Your Love So Bad" (2024)	"Secrets" (2025)

Music video
- "Secrets" on YouTube

"Secrets" is a song by American singer Miley Cyrus from the deluxe edition of her ninth studio album, Something Beautiful (2025). Released on September 18, 2025 through MCEO Inc. and Columbia Records, it features contributions from former Fleetwood Mac members Mick Fleetwood and Lindsey Buckingham.

"Secrets" has been described as a deeply personal work dedicated to Cyrus' father, Billy Ray Cyrus, incorporating lyrical themes of trust and vulnerability. Critics noted the song's intimate vocal delivery and the historical weight of Cyrus' collaboration with Fleetwood and Buckingham, framing it as a cross-generational moment that bridges musical legacies.

== Background and promotion ==
In May 2025, Cyrus released her ninth studio album Something Beautiful, which included contributions from Kid Harpoon, Michael Pollack, Maxx Morando, and Shawn Everett. The experimental record was accompanied by a film directed by Cyrus, Brendan Walter, and Jacob Bixenman, which premiered at the Tribeca Film Festival in June and was later screened in theaters for one night. Upon release, the album debuted at number four on the Billboard 200.

In September, Cyrus announced that the deluxe edition of Something Beautiful would be released on September 19. The reissue added two new tracks: "Secrets", featuring Fleetwood Mac members Mick Fleetwood and Lindsey Buckingham, and "Lockdown", featuring David Byrne. Cyrus teased the new songs through social media posts, describing "Secrets" as a personal gift for her father, Billy Ray Cyrus, on his 64th birthday.

Billy Ray referred to the song on social media as a "gift of music" and revealed that it featured two of his longtime musical influences, former Fleetwood Mac members Mick Fleetwood and Lindsey Buckingham. Walking through a field, he simply soaked in the lyrics, captioning the post, "For my birthday, Miley gave me the gift of music and wrote me a song called 'Secrets' and got my favorite musicians Fleetwood Mac to play on it! I love you Mile". (Note: Attributed to multiple sources) According to People, Cyrus had previously previewed the song during an appearance on Monica Lewinsky's podcast, where she explained that the writing process helped her reconcile tensions in her relationship with her father. (Note: Attributed to multiple sources) Cyrus first teased the track several weeks before its release. The first public snippet appeared when Billy Ray posted a video of himself listening to the song.

== Composition ==
"Secrets"
Sample of Cyrus performing "Secrets"

"Secrets" is a soft-rock influenced ballad described by Cyrus as a deeply personal work reflecting her connection with her father. Cyrus explained that she wanted the song to make her father feel safe sharing difficult truths and framed herself as mature enough to carry the weight of family challenges.

Harper's Bazaar's Chelsey Sanchez noted that "Secrets" is a heartfelt plea to a loved one who "come[s] and go[es] as [they] want" and needs reassurance that "love is not a prison". Like the rest of Something Beautiful, the track blends elements of rock and pop, with Cyrus' rich, gravelly vocals bolstered by features from Buckingham and Fleetwood. As noted by Jillian Giandurco of Nylon, "Secrets" is a song that avoids direct callbacks to Cyrus' Hannah Montana era, instead blending a little country and rock elements.

== Music video ==
The music video for "Secrets" was directed by Cyrus, Jacob Bixenman, and Brendan Walter. It features Cyrus performing at Los Angeles' Million Dollar Theatre, the same location where the artwork for Something Beautiful was originally photographed. Throughout the video, she appears in haute couture looks designed by Iris Van Herpen and Maison Margiela, alternating between a flowing white sheer ensemble and a sleek black halterneck gown complemented by a bejewelled face mask.

== Critical reception ==
Reagan Denning of Melodic Magazine noted that Cyrus is "certainly making a case for artist of a lifetime" and highlights the historical weight of her collaboration with Fleetwood and Buckingham. InStyle's Hannah Malach and KZOK-FM's Doc Reno compared Cyrus's vocals to those of another Fleetwood Mac member Stevie Nicks.

== Personnel ==
Credits were adapted from Apple Music.

=== Performers and musicians ===
- Miley Cyrus – vocals
- Mick Fleetwood – drums
- Lindsey Buckingham – electric guitar, synthesizers, drum programming
- Pino Palladino – bass
- Jonathan Rado – synthesizer, guitar, piano, percussion
- Shawn Everett – synthesizer, drums

=== Songwriting ===
- Miley Cyrus – songwriter, vocals
- Tom Hull – songwriter
- Tyler Johnson – songwriter
- Jonathan Rado – songwriter
- Michael Pollack – songwriter
- Shawn Everett – songwriter

=== Production and engineering ===
- Miley Cyrus – producer
- Jonathan Rado – producer
- Michael Pollack – producer
- Shawn Everett – producer, mixing engineer, mastering engineer
- Ian Gold – engineer
- Piéce Eatah – vocal recording engineer
- JC LeResche – assistant engineer, additional producer

== Charts ==
=== Weekly charts ===
Weekly chart performance
Chart (2025–2026)	Peak position
Argentina Hot 100 (Billboard)	56
Argentina Airplay (Monitor Latino)	7
Bolivia Anglo Airplay (Monitor Latino)	3
Bulgaria Airplay (PROPHON)	9
Central America Anglo Airplay (Monitor Latino)	17
Chile Anglo Airplay (Monitor Latino)	14
Costa Rica Anglo Airplay (Monitor Latino)	10
Croatia International Airplay (Top lista)	13
Ecuador Anglo Airplay (Monitor Latino)	6
Iceland (Tónlistinn)	33
Italy Airplay (EarOne)	3
Japan Hot Overseas (Billboard Japan)	14
Kazakhstan Airplay (TopHit)	103
Latin America Anglo Airplay (Monitor Latino)	15
Mexico Anglo Airplay (Monitor Latino)	16
New Zealand Hot Singles (RMNZ)	16
Netherlands (Single Tip)	29
Nicaragua Anglo Airplay (Monitor Latino)	2
Panama Anglo Airplay (Monitor Latino)	5
Paraguay Airplay (Monitor Latino)	16
Romania Airplay (TopHit)	47
Slovakia Airplay (ČNS IFPI)	60
UK Singles Sales (OCC)	16
Uruguay Anglo Airplay (Monitor Latino)	5

=== Monthly charts ===
Monthly chart performance
Chart (2025)	Peak position
Romania Airplay (TopHit)	51

=== Year-end charts ===
Year-end chart performance
Chart (2025)	Position
Argentina Anglo Airplay (Monitor Latino)	16

== Release history ==
List of release dates and formats
Region	Date	Format(s)	Label	Ref.
Various	September 18, 2025	Digital download; streaming	Columbia	
Italy	October 23, 2025	Radio airplay	Sony	
