= End of the World (Miley Cyrus song) =

Single by Miley Cyrus

from the album Something Beautiful
- Released: April 3, 2025
- Studio: The Village Recorder (Los Angeles, CA)
- Genre: Europop; dance-pop
- Length: 4:10; 3:49 (radio edit)
- Label: Columbia
- Composers: Jonathan Rado; Alec O'Hanley; Michael Pollack; Molly Rankin; Shawn Everett
- Lyricists: Miley Cyrus; Gregory Aldae Hein
- Producers: Miley Cyrus; Maxx Morando; Michael Pollack; Shawn Everett; Jonathan Rado; Molly Rankin; Alec O'Hanley; Max Taylor-Sheppard

Miley Cyrus singles chronology
"II Most Wanted" (2024)	"End of the World" (2025)	"Easy Lover" (2025)

Music video
- "End of the World" on YouTube

"End of the World" is a song by American singer Miley Cyrus. It was released through Columbia Records on April 3, 2025, as the lead single from her ninth studio album, Something Beautiful (2025). Alec O'Hanley and Molly Rankin of the band Alvvays were among its co-writers. Rankin performs backing vocals while O'Hanley plays guitar and synthesizers on the song.

"End of the World" is a disco-influenced pop, dance, and Europop song that explores themes of living fully amid uncertainty. Characterized by '70s-style piano chords, live strings, and a midtempo beat, the song references cultural icons and locations such as Paul McCartney and Malibu. Accompanied by a visually retro-inspired music video co-directed by Cyrus, the release has received praise for its production style, lyrical tone, and vocal performance.

== Background ==
On March 31, 2025, Cyrus' YouTube channel premiered the visual video for "Prelude". The video was directed by Cyrus alongside Jacob Bixenman and Brendan Walter. That same day, the music video for the title track, "Something Beautiful", was unveiled. In Times Square, New York City, billboards started hinting at the release of another song, "End of the World", while a teaser video was also posted on Cyrus' official website. The track was scheduled to be released as the lead single from the studio album on April 3, 2025.

== Composition ==
Slant Magazine described the song as "pop-friendly" with a "rollicking midtempo beat, live strings, and '70s-coded piano chords". Rob Sheffield of Rolling Stone described the genre as Europop. Elle called the song an "anthemic bop" in which Cyrus sings about "making the most of life". According to Stereogum, "End of the World" is a "disco-inflected anthem about partying during the apocalypse — a classic pop song topic that only gets more relevant". The song's lyrics reference partying like Paul McCartney and driving to Malibu, California for a final time. Cosmopolitan said the song has a "lighthearted production and moving lyrics".

During a preview of the song, Cyrus mentioned that she wrote this song for her mom, Tish Cyrus. In an interview with The New York Times, Cyrus expanded on that by revealing the song had been inspired by her mother going on vacation in Italy for a week without Miley and "it felt like the end of the world to both of us".

== Music video ==
The "disco-inspired" music video is directed by Cyrus, Jacob Bixenman, and Brendan Walter. In the video, Cyrus wears a dress with green sequins. Rolling Stone called the video "sexy and retro".

== Live performances ==
On May 27, Cyrus performed "End Of The World" in a private concert at the Chateau Marmont in Los Angeles for select fans discovered on TikTok. On June 18, she performed it along with older songs, during her concert at Maxim's in Paris, held for Spotify's Billions Club Live series.

== Critical reception ==
The critic Mary Siroky from Consequence called the song "timely". Paper's Shaad D'Souza said, "there is an appealing fullness to the track that suggests a little more intention than we're used to from Cyrus. It's a dance track that's weird and winsome, and Cyrus's voice sounds great on it." Atwood Magazine said the song "feels like an anthem for the present moment with an exhilarating blend of hedonism, nostalgia, and defiance in the face of looming uncertainty". Ilana Kaplan of People said the song "evokes a timeless flair as Cyrus channels ABBA". The New York Times's Jon Pareles described "End of the World" as "a luxurious pop extravaganza".

== Charts ==
=== Weekly charts ===
Weekly chart performance
Chart (2025–2026)	Peak position
Argentina Airplay (Monitor Latino)	12
Austria (Ö3 Austria Top 40)	34
Belarus Airplay (TopHit)	136
Belgium (Ultratop 50 Flanders)	5
Belgium (Ultratop 50 Wallonia)	9
Bolivia Airplay (Monitor Latino)	12
Bulgaria Airplay (PROPHON)	3
Canada Hot 100 (Billboard)	32
Canada AC (Billboard)	15
Canada CHR/Top 40 (Billboard)	22
Canada Hot AC (Billboard)	14
Central America Anglo Airplay (Monitor Latino)	2
Chile Anglo Airplay (Monitor Latino)	7
Colombia Anglo Airplay (Monitor Latino)	13
CIS Airplay (TopHit)	17
Costa Rica Anglo Airplay (Monitor Latino)	2
Croatia International Airplay (Top lista)	2
Czech Republic Airplay (ČNS IFPI)	1
Denmark Airplay (Tracklisten)	3
Dominican Republic Anglo Airplay (Monitor Latino)	7
Ecuador Anglo Airplay (Monitor Latino)	1
El Salvador Anglo Airplay (Monitor Latino)	2
Estonia Airplay (TopHit)	5
Finland Airplay (Radiosoittolista)	7
France Airplay (SNEP)	36
Germany (GfK)	40
Global 200 (Billboard)	43
Greece International (IFPI)	70
Guatemala Airplay (Monitor Latino)	6
Honduras Anglo Airplay (Monitor Latino)	4
Hungary (Editors' Choice Top 40)	9
Iceland (Tónlistinn)	20
Ireland (IRMA)	40
Italy Airplay (EarOne)	2
Japan Hot Overseas (Billboard Japan)	8
Kazakhstan Airplay (TopHit)	56
Latin America Anglo Airplay (Monitor Latino)	4
Latvia Airplay (LaIPA)	1
Lithuania Airplay (TopHit)	16
Mexico Anglo Airplay (Monitor Latino)	3
Netherlands (Dutch Top 40)	11
Netherlands (Single Top 100)	70
New Zealand Hot Singles (RMNZ)	3
Nicaragua Anglo Airplay (Monitor Latino)	1
Norway (VG-lista)	50
Panama Anglo Airplay (Monitor Latino)	3
Paraguay Airplay (Monitor Latino)	8
Peru Anglo Airplay (Monitor Latino)	4
Poland (Polish Airplay Top 100)	9
Portugal (AFP)	116
Puerto Rico Anglo Airplay (Monitor Latino)	9
Romania Airplay (Media Forest)	8
Romania TV Airplay (Media Forest)	9
Russia Airplay (TopHit)	30
San Marino Airplay (SMRTV Top 50)	3
Slovakia Airplay (ČNS IFPI)	8
South Africa Airplay (TOSAC)	4
Spain Airplay (Promusicae)	10
Suriname (Nationale Top 40)	24
Sweden (Sverigetopplistan)	59
Switzerland (Schweizer Hitparade)	57
Switzerland Airplay (IFPI)	4
Ukraine Airplay (TopHit)	6
UK Singles (Official Charts)	23
Uruguay Anglo Airplay (Monitor Latino)	6
US Billboard Hot 100	52
US Adult Contemporary (Billboard)	11
US Adult Pop Airplay (Billboard)	17
US Pop Airplay (Billboard)	19
Venezuela Airplay (Record Report)	49

=== Monthly charts ===
Monthly chart performance
Chart (2025)	Peak position
CIS Airplay (TopHit)	22
Estonia Airplay (TopHit)	9
Lithuania Airplay (TopHit)	17
Paraguay Airplay (SGP)	36
Romania Airplay (TopHit)	22
Russia Airplay (TopHit)	46
Ukraine Airplay (TopHit)	8

=== Year-end charts ===
Year-end chart performance
Chart (2025)	Position
Argentina Airplay (Monitor Latino)	28
Belgium (Ultratop 50 Flanders)	11
Belgium (Ultratop 50 Wallonia)	40
Bolivia Airplay (Monitor Latino)	85
Canada AC (Billboard)	24
Canada CHR/Top 40 (Billboard)	78
Canada Hot AC (Billboard)	46
Central America Anglo Airplay (Monitor Latino)	9
CIS Airplay (TopHit)	64
Costa Rica Anglo Airplay (Monitor Latino)	14
Dominican Republic Anglo Airplay (Monitor Latino)	34
Ecuador Anglo Airplay (Monitor Latino)	11
El Salvador Anglo Airplay (Monitor Latino)	45
Estonia Airplay (TopHit)	33
Germany (GfK)	89
Guatemala Anglo Airplay (Monitor Latino)	2
Iceland (Tónlistinn)	56
Lithuania Airplay (TopHit)	64
Mexico Anglo Airplay (Monitor Latino)	14
Netherlands (Dutch Top 40)	22
Nicaragua Anglo Airplay (Monitor Latino)	45
Panama Anglo Airplay (Monitor Latino)	81
Paraguay Anglo Airplay (Monitor Latino)	10
Peru Anglo Airplay (Monitor Latino)	69
Romania Airplay (TopHit)	60
Uruguay Anglo Airplay (Monitor Latino)	32
US Adult Contemporary (Billboard)	22
Venezuela Anglo Airplay (Monitor Latino)	26

== Certifications ==
Certifications for "End of the World"
Region	Certification	Certified units/sales
Austria (IFPI Austria)	Gold	15,000^{‡}
Brazil (Pro-Música Brasil)	Gold	20,000^{‡}
^{‡} Sales+streaming figures based on certification alone.

== Release history ==
Release history
Region	Date	Format(s)	Label	Ref.
Various	April 3, 2025	Digital download; streaming	Columbia	
Italy	April 4, 2025	Radio airplay	Sony Italy	
United States	April 7, 2025	Hot adult contemporary radio	Columbia	
United States	April 8, 2025	Contemporary hit radio	Columbia	
