= II Most Wanted =

Single by Beyoncé and Miley Cyrus

from the album Cowboy Carter
- Released: April 15, 2024
- Recorded: 2021
- Studio: The Village (Los Angeles); Westlake Recording (West Hollywood, California)
- Genre: Country
- Length: 3:28
- Label: Parkwood; Columbia
- Composer: Michael Pollack
- Lyricists: Beyoncé Knowles-Carter; Miley Cyrus; Ryan Tedder
- Producers: Beyoncé; Miley Cyrus; Shawn Everett; Michael Pollack

Beyoncé singles chronology
"Texas Hold 'Em" and "16 Carriages" (2024)	"II Most Wanted" (2024)	"Morning Dew (Donk)" (2026)

Miley Cyrus singles chronology
"Doctor (Work It Out)" (2024)	"II Most Wanted" (2024)	"End of the World" (2025)

Lyric video
- "II Most Wanted" on YouTube

"II Most Wanted" is a song by American singers Beyoncé and Miley Cyrus. It was released on April 15, 2024, through Parkwood Entertainment and Columbia Records as the third and final single from Beyoncé's eighth studio album, Cowboy Carter.

Beyoncé and Cyrus wrote "II Most Wanted" with Ryan Tedder and Michael Pollack. The track is produced by Shawn Everett, Jonathan Rado and Pollack. The song received positive reviews from music critics, naming it one of the best tracks on the album. It won the Grammy Award for Best Country Duo/Group Performance at the 2025 ceremony, both singers' first win in the country field.

Commercially "II Most Wanted" became Beyoncé's 23rd and Cyrus' 13th top-ten song on the Billboard Hot 100. The song also debuted at number two on the Hot Country Songs, scoring Beyoncé's third and Cyrus' second top-ten on the chart. During the Cowboy Carter Tour at the Paris stop of the tour, Cyrus joined Beyoncé on stage to perform the song, marking the only time the song was performed live.

== Background ==
So when Beyoncé reached out to me about music, I thought of it right away because it really encompasses our relationship. I told her, "We don't have to get country; we are country. We've been country." I said, "You know, between you being from Texas and me being from Tennessee, so much of us is going to be in this song."

— Miley Cyrus to W in 2024

Beyoncé and Cyrus previously collaborated on "Just Stand Up!" (2008) as part of the charity supergroup Artists Stand Up to Cancer, where Cyrus remembers Beyoncé being "protective" of her. In a June 2024 interview with fashion magazine W, Cyrus explained their budding friendship further: "That Christmas [(2008)], Beyoncé sent me a House of Deréon jacket that said 'Miley' on the back in gold studs, which is my favorite, and some jeans with my name on it," Cyrus said ― and the gesture clearly meant a lot to her. "In one of my songs, 'Cattitude (from project She Is Coming),' I say, 'And for my 16th birthday, I got Deréon from the house of the queen.'"

"II Most Wanted" was initially written by Cyrus around 2020 for her sixth studio album Plastic Hearts (2020). The song was used after Beyoncé reached out to her about collaborating. The song was originally titled "Shotgun Rider", and was sent to Beyoncé alongside another song, "Easy Lover", which would later be reworked for inclusion on Cyrus' eighth album Something Beautiful (2025).

In 2022, prior to the release of Beyoncé's seventh studio album Renaissance, a Variety article citing an anonymous industry source teased an unknown album featuring both "dance and country-leaning tracks... with contributions from hit songwriter Ryan Tedder." It was unclear at the time as to whether the country songs would appear as a separate album or as a component of her upcoming album.

On March 28, 2024, Beyoncé revealed the song and the collaboration as part of her studio album Cowboy Carter. Upon release, Cyrus took to Twitter to express her admiration for Beyoncé that only deepened in the process of creating the song alongside each other.

== Composition ==
The title "II Most Wanted" is a reference to their status in the music industry. The "twangy, down-tempo duet" sees the two singers "blend their distinctive voices" while trading lines and harmonizing. It features "simplistic vocal runs" by Cyrus and more "boisterous rifts" by Beyoncé, accompanied by an instrumental blend of "back porch country" and "pop rock" in the vein of Fleetwood Mac. Additional production, acoustic guitar, and keyboards were provided by Jonathan Rado of Foxygen, while the electric guitar was played by Adam Granduciel of the War on Drugs.

Although Beyoncé confirmed that all the tracks on Cowboy Carter were inspired by films, "II Most Wanted" also draws reference from a friendship or "a more romantic love". Meeting their significant other changed their lives in a profound way so they are committed "to being there for them". The lyrical content was also linked to the theme of a "ride or die" partnership, reminiscent of films like Buck and the Preacher (1972), Thelma & Louise (1991) and Bonnie and Clyde (1967). A prominent motif within the track is the use of "cowboy imagery".

== Critical reception ==
The song received widespread critical acclaim upon its release, with critics praising the complementarity of their voices. Rolling Stone's Brittany Spanos deemed "II Most Wanted" as the best collaboration on Cowboy Carter. She likened Carter's and Cyrus' personas to Butch Cassidy and Sundance Kid, respectively, and praised how their voices "melt[ed] into each other instead of fighting for the spotlight." Rolling Stone ranked the song 46th among "The 70 Greatest Beyoncé Songs".

Kyle Denis of Billboard ranked "II Most Wanted" as the third best track on the album, praising their "smoky tones" that "pair beautifully". Denis viewed the collaboration as both artists being at the "peak of their powers" that makes every stylistic choice "a home run". They evoke "a sense of emotional gravitas" that makes the song appear "a lot more high-stakes".

Mary Siroky of Consequence defined the song as "one of the more straightforward tracks on the album", describing it "a bit mournful and nostalgic, acknowledging the ever-flowing passage of time and our inability to stop it".

== Accolades ==
Awards and nominations
Organization	Year	Category	Result	Ref.
People's Choice Country Awards	2024	The Crossover Song of 2024	Nominated	
Grammy Awards	2025	Best Country Duo/Group Performance	Won	

== Commercial performance ==
The song debuted at number ten on the Billboard Global 200, scoring Beyoncé's third top-ten on the chart, after "Break My Soul" (2022) and "Texas Hold 'Em" (2024), and Cyrus' third after "Flowers" and "Used to Be Young" (2023).

In the United States, "II Most Wanted" debuted at number 6 on the Billboard Hot 100, scoring Beyoncé's 23rd and Cyrus' 13th top-ten on the chart. The song also became Cowboy Carter's third top-ten, charting simultaneously with "Texas Hold 'Em" and "Jolene". The three songs also occupied the top three positions on the Hot Country Songs, with "II Most Wanted" at second, making Beyoncé the first female artist to achieve it.

"II Most Wanted" debuted at number 9 on the UK Singles Chart on 5 April 2024, one of three songs from Cowboy Carter to chart in the top ten that week. The simultaneous top-ten debut of Beyoncé's cover of "Jolene" brought Beyoncé's tally of UK top ten singles to 24 and Cyrus' to 9.

== Charts ==
=== Weekly charts ===
Weekly chart performance
Chart (2024–2025)	Peak position
Australia (ARIA)	16
Austria (Ö3 Austria Top 40)	55
Brazil Hot 100 (Billboard)	60
Canada Hot 100 (Billboard)	17
Canada CHR/Top 40 (Billboard)	25
Canada Hot AC (Billboard)	36
Denmark (Tracklisten)	27
France (SNEP)	63
Global 200 (Billboard)	10
Greece International (IFPI)	48
Iceland (Tónlistinn)	27
Ireland (IRMA)	13
Japan Hot Overseas (Billboard Japan)	15
Lithuania (AGATA)	58
Netherlands (Single Top 100)	27
New Zealand (Recorded Music NZ)	17
Norway (VG-lista)	23
Portugal (AFP)	25
Sweden (Sverigetopplistan)	24
Switzerland (Schweizer Hitparade)	20
UK Singles (Official Charts)	9
US Billboard Hot 100	6
US Adult Pop Airplay (Billboard)	18
US Hot Country Songs (Billboard)	2
US Pop Airplay (Billboard)	19
US Rhythmic Airplay (Billboard)	33

=== Year-end charts ===
2024 year-end chart performance
Chart (2024)	Position
US Hot Country Songs (Billboard)	67

== Certifications ==
Certifications
Region	Certification	Certified units/sales
Brazil (Pro-Música Brasil)	Platinum	40,000^{‡}
Canada (Music Canada)	Gold	40,000^{‡}
United Kingdom (BPI)	Silver	200,000^{‡}
United States (RIAA)	Gold	500,000^{‡}
^{‡} Sales+streaming figures based on certification alone.

== Release history ==
Release dates and formats
Region	Date	Format	Label	Ref.
United States	April 15, 2024	Hot adult contemporary radio	Columbia	
United States	April 16, 2024	Contemporary hit radio	Columbia	
Canada	April 20, 2024	Contemporary hit radio	Columbia	
United States	April 23, 2024	Rhythmic contemporary radio	Columbia	
Various	April 26, 2024	Digital download; streaming	Columbia	
