= Every Girl You've Ever Loved =

2025 song by Miley Cyrus

Promotional single by Miley Cyrus featuring Naomi Campbell

from the album Something Beautiful
- Released: July 11, 2025
- Studio: Bandrika Studios (Los Angeles, CA) (strings and organ); The Village Recorder (Los Angeles, CA)
- Genre: Disco; disco pop
- Length: 5:18
- Label: Columbia
- Songwriters: Miley Cyrus; Michael Pollack; Shawn Everett; Alec O'Hanley; Jonathan Rado; Marie Davidson; David Dewaele; Stephen Dewaele; Pierre Guerineau; Molly Rankin
- Producers: Miley Cyrus; Michael Pollack; Shawn Everett; Jonathan Rado; Ian Gold

Music video
- "Every Girl You've Ever Loved" on YouTube

"Every Girl You've Ever Loved" is a song by the American singer Miley Cyrus featuring the British model Naomi Campbell, from the former's ninth studio album, Something Beautiful (2025). Musically, it is a disco and disco pop song with empowering lyrics and spoken-word verses performed by Campbell. Upon the album's release, music critics highlighted "Every Girl You've Ever Loved" as a standout.

Cyrus wrote "Every Girl You've Ever Loved" with Michael Pollack, Shawn Everett, Alec O'Hanley, Jonathan Rado, Pierre Guerineau, and Molly Rankin, and was in charge of its production alongside Pollack, Everett, Rado, and Ian Gold. The song contains a sample of a Soulwax remix to Marie Davidson's "Work It". A music video for "Every Girl You've Ever Loved" was released on June 30, 2025, starring both Cyrus and Campbell. Columbia Records issued a limited vinyl edition of the song on July 11, 2025.

== Background and release ==
In March 2025, the American singer Miley Cyrus announced her ninth studio album, Something Beautiful, and shared the trailer to its accompanying musical film, also titled Something Beautiful. In May, she revealed the album's track listing through a visual trailer, which featured footage of the British model Naomi Campbell. "Every Girl You've Ever Loved", the eleventh track, was announced to feature Campbell. Cyrus stated that she decided to create the song after Dolly Parton's positive reception to its title, when Cyrus shared it to her before the writing process began.

Columbia Records released the album Something Beautiful, including "Every Girl You've Ever Loved", on May 30, 2025. On the same date, Cyrus performed the track and "Easy Lover" at the 3 Dollar Bill bar in New York, where an album release party took place. In the visuals for the song included on the accompanying film, Cyrus and Campbell perform and dance in an empty warehouse with dim lights. The visuals were released as a music video on June 30, 2025, one day after being teased by Cyrus on her social media accounts. Columbia Records issued the song as a limited edition vinyl on July 11, promoted by a signing event that took place weeks prior in London's Rough Trade.

== Composition ==
Cyrus, Michael Pollack, Shawn Everett, Jonathan Rado, Alec O'Hanley, Pierre Guerineau, and Molly Rankin wrote "Every Girl You've Ever Loved", while the former three produced it with Ian Gold. The song contains a sample of a Soulwax remix to a Marie Davidson track titled "Work It"; consequently, Davidson and Soulwax members (David and Stephen Dewaele) received writing credits.

Music critics categorized "Every Girl You've Ever Loved" as a disco and disco pop song. Campbell appears to perform a spoken-word speech, in which she praises Cyrus: "She's got that kind of grace / Did Botticelli paint her face? / She's got the perfect scent / She speaks the perfect French". For NME, Nick Levine compared the sound to the ballads by the British band Coldplay, and Campbell's participation to the English musical duo Pet Shop Boys.

== Critical reception ==
Several critics highlighted "Every Girl You've Ever Loved" as a standout on Something Beautiful. Elle included "Every Girl You've Ever Loved" on a list of the best music released in May 2025; the magazine's writer Samuel Maude perceived it as a "fashion anthem" and said that it had possibilities to become "[Cyrus's] next big hit". Billboard's Lyndsey Havens ranked it as the fourth best track on the album and described its latter half as "the perfect soundtrack for a spellbinding vogue-off". Several music publications believed that the lyrics of "Every Girl You've Ever Loved" referenced the English-Albanian singer Dua Lipa. In a more negative review, Daisy Carter of DIY criticized its lyrics as cliche and "a laboured emulation of 'yass queen' sass", and Campbell's participation as not beneficial to the song.

== Usage in media ==
In April 2026, "Every Girl You've Ever Loved" was featured in the 'lip sync for the crown' segment of the grand finale of RuPaul's Drag Race season eighteen. Finalists Myki Meeks and Nini Coco performed the song, with Myki Meeks winning the lip sync and, consequently, the season. Cyrus was present to watch the performance, as she had been honored with the show's Giving Us Lifetime Achievement Award in the same episode.

== Charts ==
Chart performance for "Every Girl You've Ever Loved"
| Chart (2025) | Peak position |
|---|---|
| Central America Anglo Airplay (Monitor Latino) | 12 |
| Nicaragua Airplay (Monitor Latino) | 12 |
