= Something Beautiful (Miley Cyrus album) =

Studio album by Miley Cyrus
- Released: May 30, 2025
- Genres: Pop; progressive pop
- Length: 52:05
- Label: Columbia
- Producers: BJ Burton; Miley Cyrus; Shawn Everett; Ian Gold; Kid Harpoon; Maxx Morando; Alec O'Hanley; Michael Pollack; Jonathan Rado; Molly Rankin; Max Taylor-Sheppard

Miley Cyrus chronology
Endless Summer Vacation (2023)	Something Beautiful (2025)	Bass Persuades (2026)

Singles from Something Beautiful
- 1. "End of the World" Released: April 3, 2025; 2. "Easy Lover" Released: July 4, 2025

Singles from Something Beautiful (digital deluxe)
- 1. "Secrets" Released: September 19, 2025

Something Beautiful is the ninth studio album by American singer Miley Cyrus. It was released through Columbia Records on May 30 and was accompanied by a musical film on June 6, 2025. It was her final album with the label as she signed with Atlantic Records in mid-2026. Something Beautiful is a visual album with existential themes, centered on healing from trauma, and finding beauty in the darkest moments of life. Cyrus was an executive producer of the album with Shawn Everett and collaborated with various musicians, including Molly Rankin and Alec O'Hanley of Alvvays, Cole Haden of Model/Actriz, Danielle Haim, Flea, Pino Palladino, and Adam Granduciel of the War on Drugs. Naomi Campbell and Brittany Howard appear as guest artists. The deluxe edition, featuring two additional tracks, was released on digital platforms on September 19, 2025. It includes two members of rock band Fleetwood Mac and musician David Byrne.

The album was supported by the lead single, "End of the World"; as well as the promotional singles with "Prelude", the title track, and "More to Lose". "Easy Lover" was issued as a single weeks after the album's release. Something Beautiful was met with generally positive reviews from music critics, who praised its ambitiousness and introspection, but were more ambivalent about the songwriting and the album's lack of cohesion. The album topped the charts in Austria and has charted within the top 10 in Australia, Belgium, Germany, the Netherlands, New Zealand, Scotland, Switzerland, the United Kingdom, and the United States. The album was nominated for Best Pop Vocal Album at the 68th Annual Grammy Awards.

== Concept ==
In November 2024, in an interview with Harper's Bazaar, Miley Cyrus announced she was working on a new album, titled Something Beautiful. Inspired by Pink Floyd's The Wall (1979), she described the record as a visual album centered on the theme of "healing". She initially planned to hold a series of intimate performances of the album in "visually pleasing spaces" like forests, but she abandoned the idea in favor of the visual film, which she described as her "way of touring". She began teasing the project on March 17, 2025, by updating the visuals on her social media accounts and website and through posters around the world. She announced the album on March 24. On May 19, she revealed the track listing for the album, including features with Brittany Howard and Naomi Campbell. On September 17, she announced that the deluxe edition of the album would be released two days later and would contain two new tracks, one featuring Lindsey Buckingham and Mick Fleetwood and the other featuring David Byrne.

== Themes and composition ==
Consisting of thirteen songs, Something Beautiful was executive produced by Cyrus and Shawn Everett. It is a pop and progressive pop record. Its artwork was photographed by Glen Luchford and features Cyrus draped in archival 1997 Thierry Mugler couture, which was described as a "striking nod" to the album's "bold" aesthetic and visual storytelling. Cyrus described the album as "hypnotic" and as "an attempt to medicate somewhat of a sick culture through music". The album's themes center around beauty, death, psychedelia, impermanence, heartbreak, and destruction. When discussing the thematic inspiration for the album, she claimed "the nastiest times of our life do have a point of beauty. They are the shadow, they are the charcoal, they are the shading. You can't have a painting without highlights and contrast."

=== Songs ===
Something Beautiful begins with "Prelude", an existential spoken word intro supported by electronic instrumentals. In its lyrics, Cyrus details the experience of capturing beauty in passing moments, explores existential thoughts, and contemplates the duality of beauty. It drew comparisons to Tangerine Dream, sci-fi scores, spaghetti Western overtures and Laurie Anderson. The album's title track begins as an alternative R&B ballad fused with soul and jazz influences. During the chorus, it "explodes" into experimental rock and psychedelic pop, highlighted by Cyrus' distorted vocals. "End of the World" is a disco-inflected pop anthem about mortality and escapism in the face of an inevitable apocalypse. The song explores the "juxtaposition between the happiness of being with someone you love while the world is crashing down around you". "More to Lose" is a "cinematic" ballad with guitar, piano, and string instrumentation; its introspective lyrics reflect on a failed relationship.

== Accompanying film ==
The album's accompanying musical film was written and directed by Cyrus, Jacob Bixenman and Brendan Walter. It was produced by Columbia Records, Sony Music Vision, Live Nation Entertainment and XYZ Films. It premiered on June 6, 2025, at the Tribeca Festival. It was released theatrically for one night only, on June 12, 2025, in the United States and Canada and on June 27 internationally.

== Promotion ==
=== Singles and promotional singles ===
On March 31, 2025, "Prelude" was released, along with its music video. The same day, the title track and its music video were also released.

Billboards in Times Square, New York City, began teasing the release of another track, "End of the World", with a teaser video published on Cyrus' official website. It was released on April 3, 2025, as the album's lead single. The song peaked at the 43rd position on the Billboard Global 200. In the United States, it debuted and peaked at number 52 on the Billboard Hot 100 and reached the top 20 on Pop Airplay, Adult Pop Airplay, and Adult Contemporary charts. In the United Kingdom, it debuted at number 23 on the UK Singles Chart. The song performed better in Europe, peaking in the top 10 in multiple countries. (Note: Belgium (Flanders), Bulgaria, Croatia, Czech Republic, Estonia, Latvia, Poland, Romania, San Marino and Slovakia.)

On May 9, "More to Lose" was released along with its music video. An edited version of "Walk of Fame" was released alongside the album, a vinyl release also including the edited version of "Reborn" was released on November 14, 2025. Coinciding with the album's release, the music video for "Easy Lover" was released. It was released as the album's second official single on July 4, serviced to Italian radio stations. A limited edition vinyl of "Every Girl You've Ever Loved" was released on July 11, 2025 as a promotional single. "Secrets" was released as the only single from the digital deluxe edition on September 19, 2025.

=== Live performances and appearances ===
On May 3, Cyrus premiered "More to Lose" during a small-scale performance at Casa Cipriani in New York City. Spotify hosted "An Evening with Miley Cyrus" album listening and film screening event for a limited number of fans in New York City on May 6. On May 21, her interview with Zane Lowe for Apple Music was released. The following day, she appeared on Jimmy Kimmel Live!, where she performed "More to Lose". On May 27, she held a private concert at Chateau Marmont in Los Angeles for selected fans discovered on TikTok, where she performed "More to Lose", "Easy Lover", "Flowers", "The Climb" and "End of the World".

After the album's release, she held a series of intimate performances. On May 30, she appeared unannounced at the album release ball at the 3 Dollar Bill Club in Brooklyn, where she performed "Easy Lover". On June 2, she sang "More to Lose", "Easy Lover" and "Flowers" during a surprise performance at Bemelmans Bar in the Carlyle Hotel in New York City. On June 4, she held an album signing along with a live performance at the Rough Trade shop in New York. On the same day, she appeared on The Tonight Show Starring Jimmy Fallon. The next day, her interview on the Every Single Album podcast was released. On June 18, she performed "End of the World", "More to Lose" and "Easy Lover", along with older songs, during her concert at the Maxim's in Paris, held for Spotify's Billions Club Live.

== Critical reception ==
Professional ratings
Aggregate scores
Source	Rating
AnyDecentMusic?	6.5/10
Metacritic	71/100
Review scores
Source	Rating
AllMusic	4/5 stars
Consequence	B
The Daily Telegraph	2/5 stars
The Guardian	3/5 stars
The Independent	3/5 stars
NME	4/5 stars
Paste	8/10
Pitchfork	5.6/10
Rolling Stone	4/5 stars
Slant Magazine	4/5 stars

Upon its release, Something Beautiful was met with generally favorable reviews from music critics, with many praising it as one of Cyrus' most ambitious and introspective works to date. According to the review aggregator Metacritic, Something Beautiful received "generally favorable reviews" based on a weighted average score of 71 out of 100 from 16 critic scores.

Rolling Stone's Rob Sheffield described the album as "Cyrus aiming higher than ever", calling it "a wide-ranging search for light (and sax solos) in the darkness", and noting its conceptual ambition inspired by The Wall. Nick Levine of NME called it "a fully realized artistic statement", adding that Cyrus "records what she wants, when she wants, because she knows she's got the chops to pull it off". He highlighted the album's cinematic elements and praised its genre-blending confidence. Roisin O'Connor of The Independent opined that the album "isn't quite as crazy or groundbreaking as she seems to think, but its spirit of adventure encapsulates what we've come to know and love about one of our most frustrating yet endearing pop stars". In Slant Magazine, Sal Cinquemani wrote that "unlike that of its predecessor [Endless Summer Vacation], the music on Something Beautiful oozes as much personality as the singer herself". Alexis Petridis of The Guardian called the album "very well written and well made, a varied succession of good vehicles for Cyrus’s powerfully raspy voice". Matt Mitchell wrote in Paste that "Miley Cyrus at her very best was well worth the wait", adding that "eclecticism is no longer lost in the void of marketable tracklists". Sputnikmusic's Dakota West Foss called the album "an absolute triumph that casts aside any qualifiers to make a strong bid for the best major pop album of 2025 so far". AllMusic's Heather Phares opined that "Cyrus' restless creativity and expert craft is a formidable combination, and at its best, Something Beautiful has a fearlessness and sensuality that could be the beginning of something exciting for her music".

The Arts Desk's Joe Muggs opined that the album "sounds like a billion dollars" and praised the production, but criticized the songwriting. He called it "yet another wonderfully messy instalment in a brilliantly messy career – and maybe, maybe a hint of the masterpiece she surely has in her yet". Wren Graves, writing in Consequence, described it as a "top-to-bottom vocal showcase, with some poetry and a couple of conceptual touches" but "far from perfect", adding that "the result is messy, ambitious, occasionally frustrating, and one-of-a-kind". Megan LaPierre of Exclaim! complimented the production and vocals, but opined that "dizzy on the comedown, you're unable to remember a single lyrical platitude or recycled melody", describing the album as "all style and no substance". Clash's Robin Murray opined that the album "is searching for a unity that doesn’t quite coalesce, all while lacking some of the towering peaks of Miley's more commercially-focussed work".

In Pitchfork, Madison Bloom described Something Beautiful as a tonally inconsistent concept album that begins powerfully with its lead singles but stumbles with generic pop-rock and nonsensical lyrics. While praising Cyrus' vocals, Bloom complained about the album's lack of direction and did not believe its ambitions were fully embodied, calling this "a concept album without a concept". The Daily Telegraph's Neil McCormick deemed it "practically unlistenable" and a "parade of trite ditties". Ed Power of The Irish Times called the album an "ambitious yet patchy and underwhelming record", as well as "largely colourless and lustreless".

=== Accolades ===
Awards and nominations
Organization	Year	Category	Result	Ref.
Grammy Awards	2026	Best Pop Vocal Album	Nominated	

Year-end lists
Publication	List	Rank	Ref.
Slant Magazine	The 50 Best Albums of 2025	21	
The Needle Drop	Top 50 Albums of 2025	27	
Still Listening Magazine	Top 50 Albums of 2025	46	

== Commercial performance ==
In the United States, Something Beautiful debuted at number four on the Billboard 200, earning 44,000 album-equivalent units, including 27,000 pure album sales, becoming Cyrus' fifteenth top 10 album. However, it only stayed one week at the top 10 before falling down to position #102 in its second week and leaving the chart in its third week. It is her shortest-charting album to date. Within the United Kingdom, it entered at number three on the UK Albums Chart, becoming the highest new entry of the week and Cyrus' seventh top 10 album. Elsewhere, it opened at number four on Australia's ARIA Albums Chart.

== Track listing ==
Credits were adapted from Pitchfork.

Standard edition
No.	Title	Writer(s)	Producer(s)	Length
1.	"Prelude"	Miley Cyrus; Maxx Morando; Cole Haden; Shawn Everett; Jonathan Rado; Michael Pollack	Cyrus; Morando; Everett; Rado; Pollack	2:35
2.	"Something Beautiful"	Cyrus; Morando; Max Taylor-Sheppard; Pollack; Ryan Beatty	Cyrus; Morando; Taylor-Sheppard; Everett; Rado; Pollack	4:31
3.	"End of the World"	Cyrus; Pollack; Gregory Aldae Hein; Everett; Rado; Molly Rankin; Alec O'Hanley	Cyrus; Everett; Pollack; Rado; Morando; Taylor-Sheppard; Rankin; O'Hanley	4:10
4.	"More to Lose"	Cyrus; Pollack; Autumn Rowe	Cyrus; Everett; Pollack; Rado; BJ Burton	4:35
5.	"Interlude 1"	Cyrus; Morando; Taylor-Sheppard; Everett; Rado; Pollack	Cyrus; Morando; Everett; Taylor-Sheppard; Rado; Pollack	1:14
6.	"Easy Lover"	Cyrus; Pollack; Ryan Tedder; Omer Fedi	Cyrus; Everett; Pollack; Rado	3:06
7.	"Interlude 2"	Cyrus; Morando; Everett; Rado; Pollack	Cyrus; Morando; Everett; Rado; Pollack	1:30
8.	"Golden Burning Sun"	Cyrus; Pollack; Everett; Rado; Bibi Bourelly; Tobias Jesso Jr.	Cyrus; Everett; Rado; Pollack; Burton	4:54
9.	"Walk of Fame" (featuring Brittany Howard)	Cyrus; Morando; Pollack; Everett; Howard; Rado	Cyrus; Everett; Pollack; Rado; Morando	6:00
10.	"Pretend You're God"	Cyrus; Morando; Hein; Pollack; Andrew Wyatt; Emile Haynie; Everett; Rado	Cyrus; Everett; Rado; Pollack; Morando	4:39
11.	"Every Girl You've Ever Loved" (featuring Naomi Campbell)	Cyrus; Pollack; Everett; O'Hanley; Rado; Marie Davidson; David Dewaele; Stephen Dewaele; Pierre Guerineau; Rankin	Cyrus; Everett; Rado; Pollack; Ian Gold	5:18
12.	"Reborn"	Cyrus; Hein; Pollack; Morando; Taylor-Sheppard; Everett; Rado; Ethan Shevin; Gold	Cyrus; Everett; Rado; Pollack; Morando; Taylor-Sheppard; Shevin	5:42
13.	"Give Me Love"	Cyrus; Tom Hull; Tyler Johnson	Cyrus; Everett; Rado; Pollack; Kid Harpoon; Johnson	3:51
Total length:				52:05

Digital deluxe edition
No.	Title	Writer(s)	Producer(s)	Length
14.	"Secrets" (featuring Lindsey Buckingham and Mick Fleetwood)	Cyrus; Hull; Johnson; Rado; Pollack; Everett	Cyrus; Rado; Pollack; Everett	3:49
15.	"Lockdown" (featuring David Byrne)	Cyrus; Byrne; Rado; Morando; Taylor-Sheppard; Everett; Pino Palladino; Pollack; Hein	Cyrus; Rado; Morando; Taylor-Sheppard; Everett	13:31
Total length:				69:25

=== Notes ===
- "Every Girl You've Ever Loved" contains a sample of "Work It" (Soulwax remix), written by Marie Davidson, David Dewaele, Stephen Dewaele, and Pierre Guerineau, and performed by Davidson.

== Credits and personnel ==
Credits were adapted from album liner notes.

=== Locations ===
- Strings and organ recorded at Bandrika Studios, Los Angeles (tracks 1, 5, 7, 11)
- Engineered at the Village, Los Angeles
- Mixed and mastered at Subtle McNugget Studios, Los Angeles

=== Musicians ===
- Miley Cyrus – vocals (all tracks), vocal loop pad (track 4), Minimoog (12)
- Shawn Everett – sound effects, foley (tracks 1, 2, 5–7, 12); drum programming (1, 3, 8–12), synthesizer programming (1, 4, 7, 9, 12); Teenage Engineering choir programming, claps programming (3); vocal loop pad programming (4); stomps, string synthesizers, programming (6); ambient sculpture (8), TB-303 (9), MS-20 programming (10), TB-303 programming (11, 12); LinnDrum programming, vocoder programming (11); TR-909 programming, choir instrument (12); screen horns, string programming, choir programming, guitar programming (13)
- Jonathan Rado – EMS Synthi (tracks 1–5, 7, 8, 12, 13); sound effects, foley (1, 2, 4–7); Moog System 55 (1, 5, 7, 10, 11), Fairlight CMI (1, 5, 7, 11, 13), Barr-Fox Wurlitzer Theater Organ programming (1, 7), MS-20 (1, 8–13), Mellotron (2, 3, 12), vibraphone (2, 4, 5, 7, 8, 12), piano (2, 4), CS-80 (2, 8–10, 12), Lexicon Prime Time (2, 12), electric guitar (3, 4, 8, 9, 11–13), acoustic guitar (3, 4, 10, 12, 13); Yamaha CP-70, six-string bass, Juno-106, LinnDrum, high-strung acoustic guitar, glockenspiel, bass, percussion (3); treatments (4, 5, 8, 9, 12); Hammond B3, tape loops (4, 8); Marxophone (4, 10, 13), tubular bells (4, 13); drums, choir sample programming, Rhodes (4), synthesizer programming (5, 9); guitar, stomps (6); Wurlitzer 200a (8, 10–12), ARP Quartet (9, 11, 12); Waldorf Wave, JP-8000, clavinet, JV-1080, Juno-60 (9); slide guitar (10); LinnDrum programming, MPC programming, melodic bass, TR-808 programming, Elka Synthex (11); Oberheim, trem synthesizer, Akai filtering (12); timpani (13)
- Pino Palladino – bass guitar (tracks 1–6, 8–13), fretless bass (4)
- Maxx Morando – OB-6 (tracks 1, 3, 7, 10), Minimoog (1, 7); ARP Solina String Ensemble, drum programming (1); drums (2–4, 9, 10), bass (2–4, 9), Pulsar-23 drum machine (2, 4, 7), electric guitar (2, 9, 10); guitar, Moog DFAM, Tascam Portastudio 424 MK2 (4); Perkons HD-01 (7, 9); Prophet-5, Overstayer modular channel (7); drum machine, Kurzweil K2000 (12)
- Ian Gold – sound effects, foley (tracks 1, 2, 4–8); Barr-Fox Wurlitzer Theater Organ programming (1); stomps, background vocal effects (6); string programming (7), TR-808 programming (11); TB-303 programming, TR-909 programming, choir instrument, Juno-106, Wurlitzer (12)
- Pièce Eatah – sound effects, foley (tracks 1, 2, 4–8)
- Maxwell Karmazyn – arrangement (tracks 1, 3, 5, 7, 8, 11–13), string leader (1, 5, 7, 11), violin (3, 8); viola, shoulder cello (13)
- Tim Curtis – Fairlight CMI programming (tracks 1, 5, 7, 11, 13), Moog System 55 programming (1, 5, 7, 11)
- Henry Solomon – saxophone (tracks 1, 7, 11), clarinets (5, 7); alto saxophone, baritone saxophone, bass clarinet (5)
- Alyssa Park – first violin (tracks 1, 5, 7, 11)
- Luanne Homzy – first violin (tracks 1, 5, 7, 11)
- Ben Jacobson – first violin (tracks 1, 5, 7, 11)
- Molly Rogers – first violin (tracks 1, 5, 7, 11), viola (3, 8)
- Wynton Grant – first violin (tracks 1, 5, 7, 11)
- Andrew Kwon – first violin (tracks 1, 5, 7, 11)
- Jessica Guediri – second violin (tracks 1, 5, 7, 11)
- Maya Magub – second violin (tracks 1, 5, 7, 11)
- Aiko Richter – second violin (tracks 1, 5, 7, 11)
- Stephanie Yu – second violin (tracks 1, 5, 7, 11)
- Eun-Mee Ahn – second violin (tracks 1, 5, 7, 11)
- Clayton Penrose-Whitmore – second violin (tracks 1, 5, 7, 11)
- Luke Maurer – viola (tracks 1, 5, 7, 11)
- Zach Dellinger – viola (tracks 1, 5, 7, 11)
- Rita Andrade – viola (tracks 1, 5, 7, 11)
- Drew Forde – viola (tracks 1, 5, 7, 11)
- Jake Braun – cello (tracks 1, 5, 7, 11)
- Charlie Tyler – cello (tracks 1, 5, 7, 11)
- Caleb Vaughn-Jones – cello (tracks 1, 5, 7, 11)
- Christine Kim – cello (tracks 1, 5, 7, 11)
- Eric Shetzen – double bass (tracks 1, 5, 7, 11)
- Jules Levy – double bass (tracks 1, 5, 7, 11, 13)
- Tim Davies – conductor (tracks 1, 5, 7, 11)
- Ty Woodward – organ (tracks 1, 7, 11)
- Max Sheppard – Modor NF-1, Prophet-10 (tracks 2, 4, 12); Hammond B3 (2); Rhodes, OB-6 (3); Kurzweil K2000 (4, 12); bass, drums, Waldorf Quantum (4), drum machine (12)
- Adam Granduciel – electric guitar (tracks 2, 10)
- Kenny Segal – Omnichord (tracks 2, 10), sampler (10)
- Nick Hakim – Rhodes, Moog Model D (track 2); prepared piano (13)
- Adam Schatz – tenor saxophone (track 2)
- Josh Johnson – alto saxophone, saxophone solo (track 2)
- Jon Natchez – baritone saxophone (track 2)
- Xoco Everett – vocals (track 2)
- Alec O'Hanley – synthesizers (tracks 3, 9, 11, 12), electric guitar (3, 12); Juno, ARP, Prophet, acoustic guitar, piano, emulator (3); Oberheim DMX (11)
- Adam Millstein – violin (tracks 3, 8)
- Dennis Karmazyn – cello (tracks 3, 8)
- Molly Rankin – vocals (tracks 3, 11)
- Michael Pollack – Wurlitzer 200a (tracks 4, 11); piano, choir sample programming, harpsichord (4); ARP Quartet (9, 11); Juno-60, Waldorf Wave (9); MS-20 (11), Yamaha Portasound (12)
- BJ Burton – saxophone programming, violin programming, modular piano (track 4)
- Nelson Devereaux – saxophone (track 4)
- Bed Gaunt – violin (track 4)
- Drew Erickson – harpsichord, Hammond B3 (track 4)
- Larry Goldings – harpsichord, Hammond B3 (track 4)
- Sara Kawai – harp (track 4)
- Sarah Barthel – choir vocals (track 4)
- Nate Smith – rhythmic programming (track 4)
- Bob Everett – drums (tracks 5, 12)
- Charlie Anastasis – bass (track 5)
- Sam De La Torre – guitar (track 5)
- Brittany Howard – electric guitar (tracks 6, 9), vocals (9)
- Justin Brown – drums (track 6)
- Sara Watkins – fiddle (track 6)
- Matt Pynn – pedal steel guitar (track 6)
- Bronte Araghi – background vocal effects (track 6)
- Joey Waronker – drums (tracks 8, 11)
- Nick Zinner – electric guitar (track 8)
- Fabrienne Grisel – motorcycle (track 8)
- Money Mark – clavinet (track 9)
- Danielle Haim – electric guitar (track 9)
- Jay Rudolph – Syndrum, Vermona DRM-1 (track 9)
- Kane Ritchotte – drums (tracks 11, 12)
- Thomas Bloch – Cristal Baschet, Ondes Martenot (tracks 11, 13)
- Flea – bass (track 11)
- Naomi Campbell – spoken word (track 11)
- Joseph Shabason – saxophone (track 11)
- Soulwax – bass sample (track 11)
- Ethan Shevin – drum machine, Kurzweil K2000, Prophet-10 (track 12)
- Michael Lichtenauer – choir vocals (track 12)
- David Morales – choir vocals (track 12)
- Luc Kleiner – choir vocals (track 12)
- Dermot Kiernan – choir vocals (track 12)
- Eric Lyn – choir vocals (track 12)
- Matthew Broen – choir vocals (track 12)
- Mariachi los Camperos – trumpets, violins, guitarrón, vihuela, harp, acoustic guitar (track 13)
- Randy George – theremin (track 13)
- Ashley Jarmack – flute, bass flute, clarinet, oboe, tin whistle (track 13)
- John R. Walters – clarinet, bass clarinet (track 13)
- Patrick R. Posey – alto saxophone, baritone saxophone (track 13)
- Niall Taro Ferguson – cello (track 13)
- Andrew Synowiec – sitar, electric sitar (track 13)
- Michael D'Addario – nylon-string acoustic guitar (track 13)
- Kid Harpoon – drum programming, 12-string acoustic guitar, bass (track 13)

=== Technical ===
- Shawn Everett – mixing, mastering, engineering, vocal engineering
- Ian Gold – engineering, mixing assistance (all tracks); vocal engineering (track 9)
- Pièce Eatah – engineering, vocal engineering
- Ivan Wayman – engineering (tracks 2, 3, 12)
- BJ Burton – engineering (track 4)
- Kid Harpoon – engineering, vocal engineering (track 13)
- JC LeResche – engineering assistance, tape operation
- Alisse Laymac – engineering assistance (tracks 2, 3, 13)
- Ben Miller – engineering assistance (tracks 2, 11, 12)
- JC Chiam – engineering assistance (tracks 3, 4, 9, 12, 13)
- Nick Hodges – engineering assistance (tracks 10, 13)
- Nicole Schmidt – engineering assistance (track 11)
- Claudia Iatalese – engineering assistance (track 13)
- Harry Risoleo – string engineering assistance, Barr-Fox Wurlitzer Theater Organ engineering (tracks 1, 5, 7, 11)
- Joyie Lai – string engineering assistance (tracks 1, 5, 7, 11)
- Tristan Curbishley – string engineering assistance (tracks 1, 5, 7)
- Tim Reitnouer – fiddle engineering (track 6)
- Teo Suarez – studio assistance (tracks 1, 5, 7)

=== Design ===
- Jacob Bixenman – creative direction
- Glen Luchford – photography
- Zak Group – design

== Charts ==
Chart performance
Chart (2025)	Peak position
Australian Albums (ARIA)	4
Austrian Albums (Ö3 Austria)	1
Belgian Albums (Ultratop Flanders)	6
Belgian Albums (Ultratop Wallonia)	2
Canadian Albums (Billboard)	13
Croatian International Albums (HDU)	14
Czech Albums (ČNS IFPI)	28
Danish Albums (Hitlisten)	18
Dutch Albums (Album Top 100)	6
Finnish Albums (Suomen virallinen lista)	31
French Albums (SNEP)	13
German Albums (Offizielle Top 100)	4
Greek Albums (IFPI)	38
Hungarian Albums (MAHASZ)	10
Irish Albums (Official Charts)	14
Italian Albums (FIMI)	23
Japanese Western Albums (Oricon)	13
Lithuanian Albums (AGATA)	32
New Zealand Albums (RMNZ)	2
Norwegian Albums (VG-lista)	14
Polish Albums (ZPAV)	7
Portuguese Albums (AFP)	3
Scottish Albums (Official Charts)	4
Slovak Albums (ČNS IFPI)	69
Spanish Albums (Promusicae)	6
Swedish Albums (Sverigetopplistan)	24
Swiss Albums (Schweizer Hitparade)	3
UK Albums (Official Charts)	3
US Billboard 200	4
