= Tape op =

Assistant recording engineer

A tape operator or tape op, also known as a second engineer, is a person who performs menial operations in a recording studio in a similar manner to a tea boy or gopher. They may act as an apprentice or an assistant to a recording engineer and duties can consist of threading audio tape, setting up microphones and stands, configuring MIDI equipment and cables, and sometimes pressing the relevant transport controls on the recorder or digital audio workstation. Abbey Road Studios always assigned at least one tape op to each recording session.

== History and prospects ==
The role of tape op was a useful entry into a professional recording environment, and several went on to successful careers as engineers and record producers. The music and film soundtrack producer John Kurlander started his production career at Abbey Road Studios in 1967 as a tea boy, progressing to principal tape op (or assistant engineer) by 1969. He was partially responsible for including "Her Majesty" on the Beatles' Abbey Road after carefully splicing a discarded take of the song onto the master tape. Alan Parsons also began his production career as an Abbey Road tape op, which led to him to assisting with the mixing of Pink Floyd's Atom Heart Mother and engineering on The Dark Side of the Moon.

Due to the increasing ability to produce professional-quality recordings at home studios, the experience that can be gained by working as a tape op is being lost, resulting in people having a harder learning curve with music engineering and production.
