= 3 Dollar Bill =

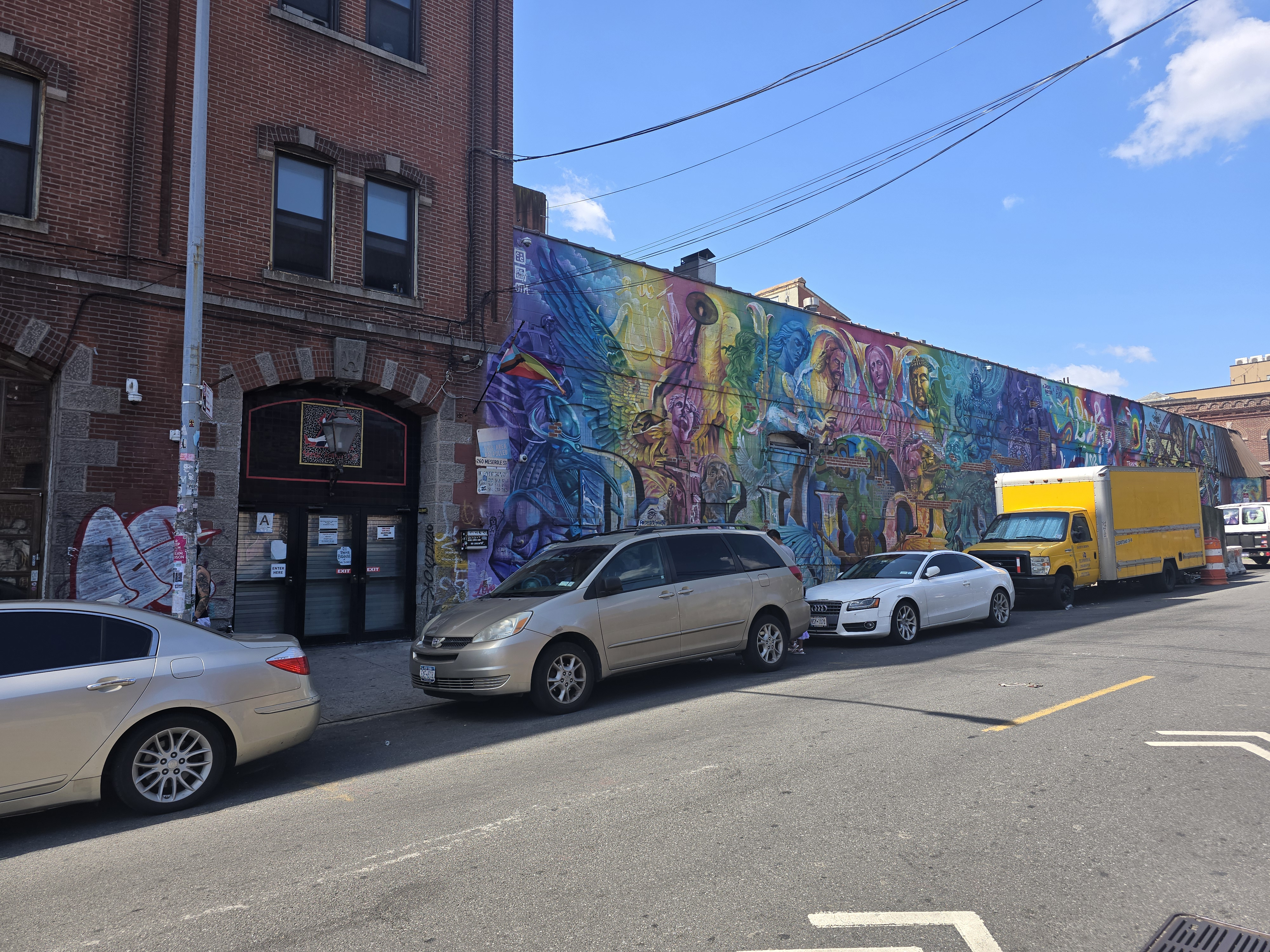
- The bar's exterior features a vibrant mural
- Interactive map of 3 Dollar Bill

Restaurant information
- Location: 260 Meserole Street, Brooklyn, New York, 11206, United States
- Coordinates: 40°42′30″N 73°56′17″W

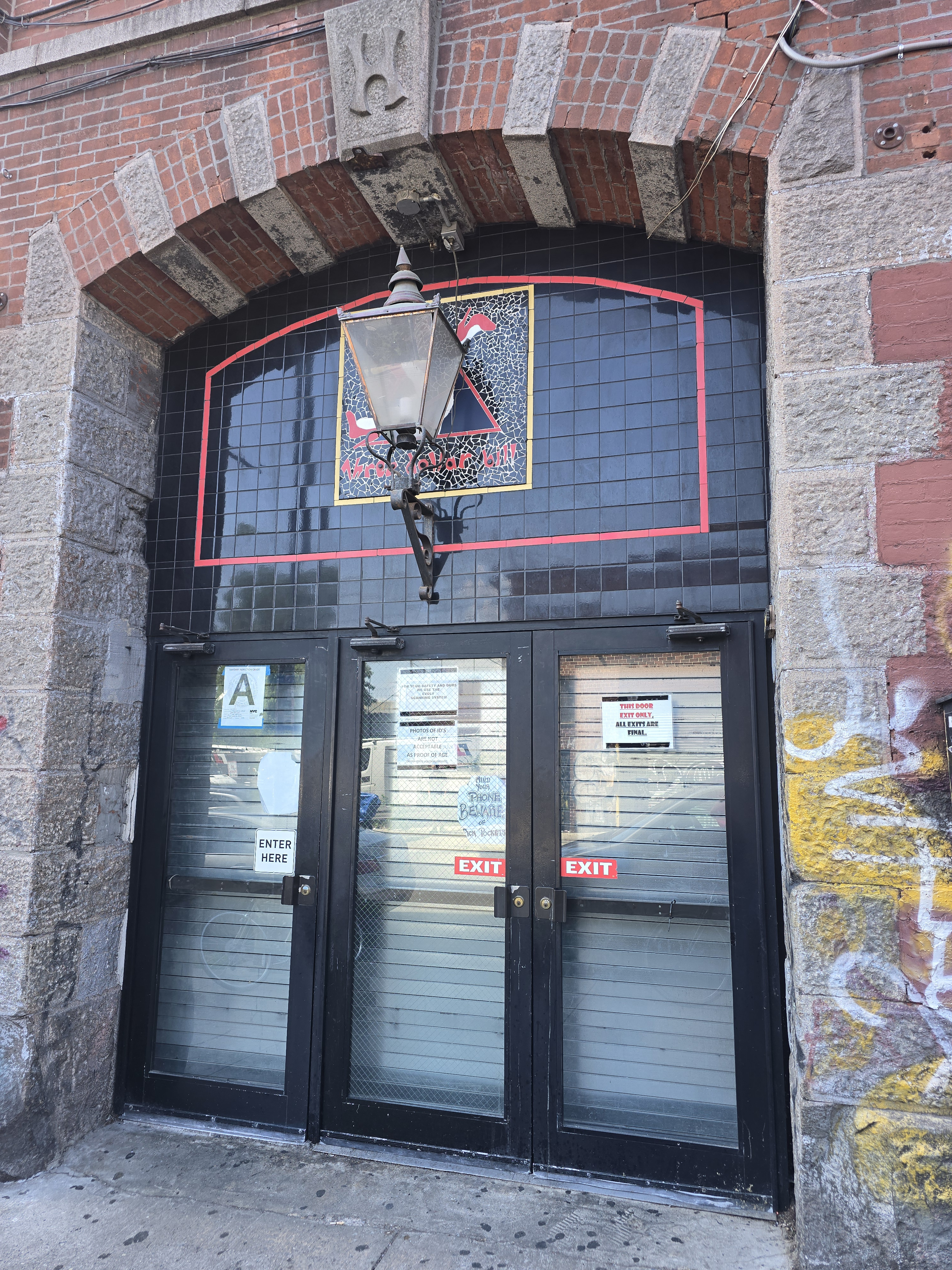
The entrance to Three Dollar Bill

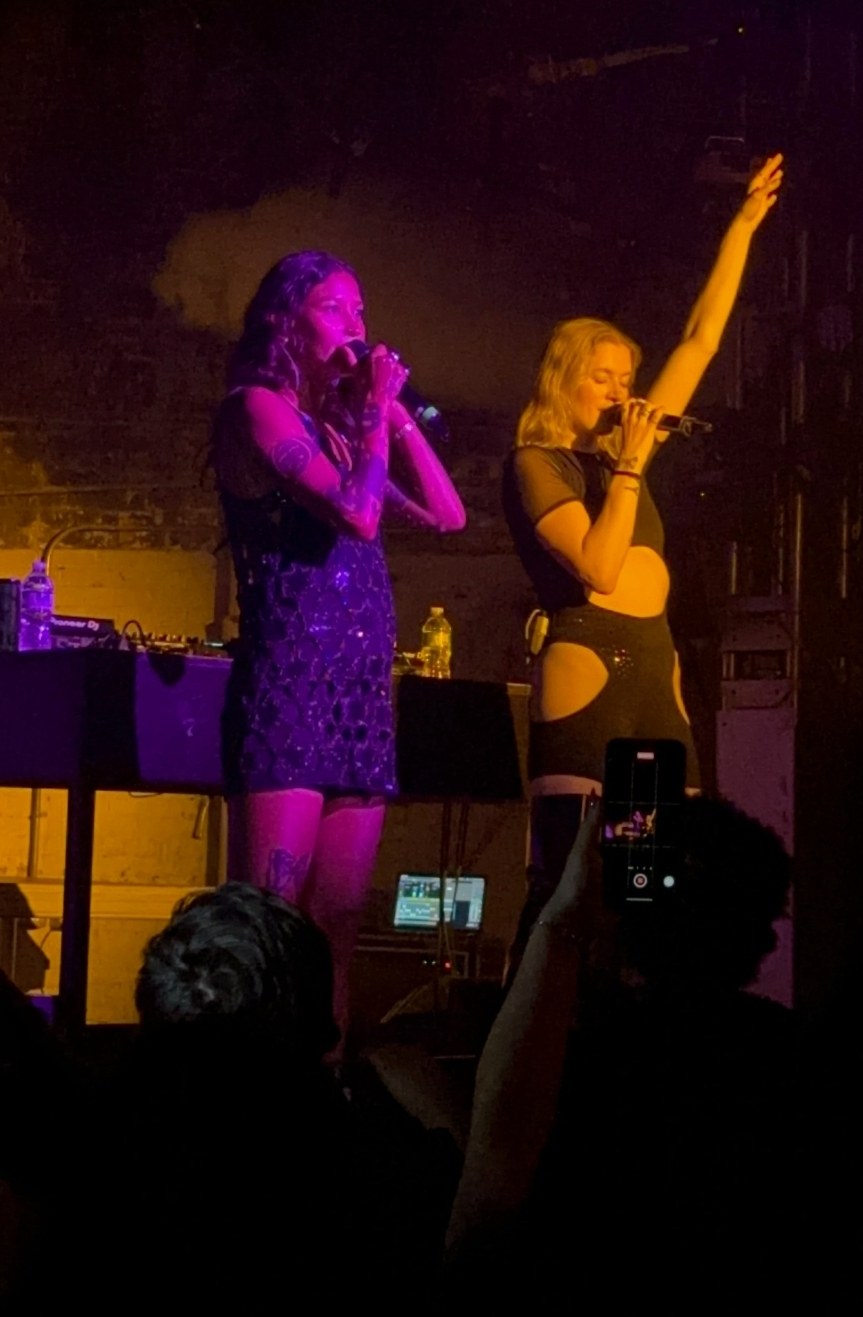
Icona Pop performs at 3 Dollar Bill

3 Dollar Bill is a bar in East Williamsburg that is said to be the city's largest LGBTQ+ owned venue. The bar, which opened in 2018, takes its name from the phrase queer as a three dollar bill. The building in which the bar is located is a series of red brick buildings had been the Otto Huber Brewery until the 1950s, rendering it large enough for parties and a community space, with the bar occupying 10,000 square feet (930 m^{2}) of space.

The bar's owner, Brenda Breathnach, is a lesbian from Ireland. She also owned Phoenix, a gay bar in Manhattan's East Village.

== See also ==
- List of LGBTQ bars
