= Jacob Bixenman =

American model and director (born 1994)

- Born: Jacob Taylor Bixenman; May 27, 1994 (age 32)
- Occupations: Model, director, creative director, photographer
- Website: jacobbixenman.com

Jacob Taylor Bixenman (born May 27, 1994) is an American model, director, creative director, and photographer.

== Career ==
Bixenman is represented by IMG Models. He has modeled for Dolce & Gabbana, Jean-Paul Gaultier, and Valentino.

He has worked as a director and/or creative director with artists and brands including Miley Cyrus, Gucci Beauty, Ryan Beatty, Elias Rønnenfelt, and Sabrina Carpenter.

== Personal life ==
He started dating Australian singer and actor Troye Sivan in 2016. In early 2020, they broke up.
