= Brendan Walter =

American film director and guitarist (born 1986)

- Born: June 16, 1986 (age 40); Philadelphia, Pennsylvania, U.S.
- Occupations: Director; Photographer; Filmmaker; Musician
- Website: brendanwalter.net

Brendan Stuart Walter (born June 16, 1986) is an American film maker, photographer, musician, and music video and commercial director. He was also the lead guitarist of Valencia.

== Biography ==
Walter was born on June 16, 1986 in Philadelphia, Pennsylvania. He attended Drexel University for one year and was one of 32 students sued by the RIAA in its first round file-sharing suits. He dropped out of school to begin touring and releasing records with the band Valencia.

== Valencia ==
Walter spent seven years touring, writing, and recording music with Valencia. He signed with I Surrender Records in 2005, and then with Columbia records in 2007. Valencia went on to release 3 major records.

On October 11, 2011, Valencia announced that they were going on hiatus. Their last show was at the Electric Factory on December 28, 2011. The band reunited for 2 sold out shows in Philadelphia and New York in December 2016.

== Music videos and photography ==
After moving to New York in 2011, Walter began other creative pursuits. He took a job at Crush Music and began overseeing creative work for their roster of artists. Since then he has moved on to film and TV with the launch of Crush Pictures in 2017 with partner Jon Lullo. He has directed music videos, taken photos and designed album covers for multiple artists, such as Sia, Weezer, Lorde, Kesha, Fall Out Boy, The Lonely Island, American Authors, Train, Panic! at the Disco, Green Day, Marina, and Shawn Mendes.

Walter's work has landed him an MTV VMA. He was nominated for Best Rock Video for the 2017 MTV Video Music Awards for his directing on Fall Out Boy's "Young and Menace" music video.

Walter's photography has been featured on billboards and album covers, and he has worked with brands and bands around the world. His portfolio includes portraits, landscapes and product photography.

== Film and television ==
His work in directing music videos and commercials has started his move towards feature films. Walter made his first feature-length film, Spell, a dark comedy psychological thriller in 2018.
