= Miley Cyrus videography =

Videos and media by American singer and actress

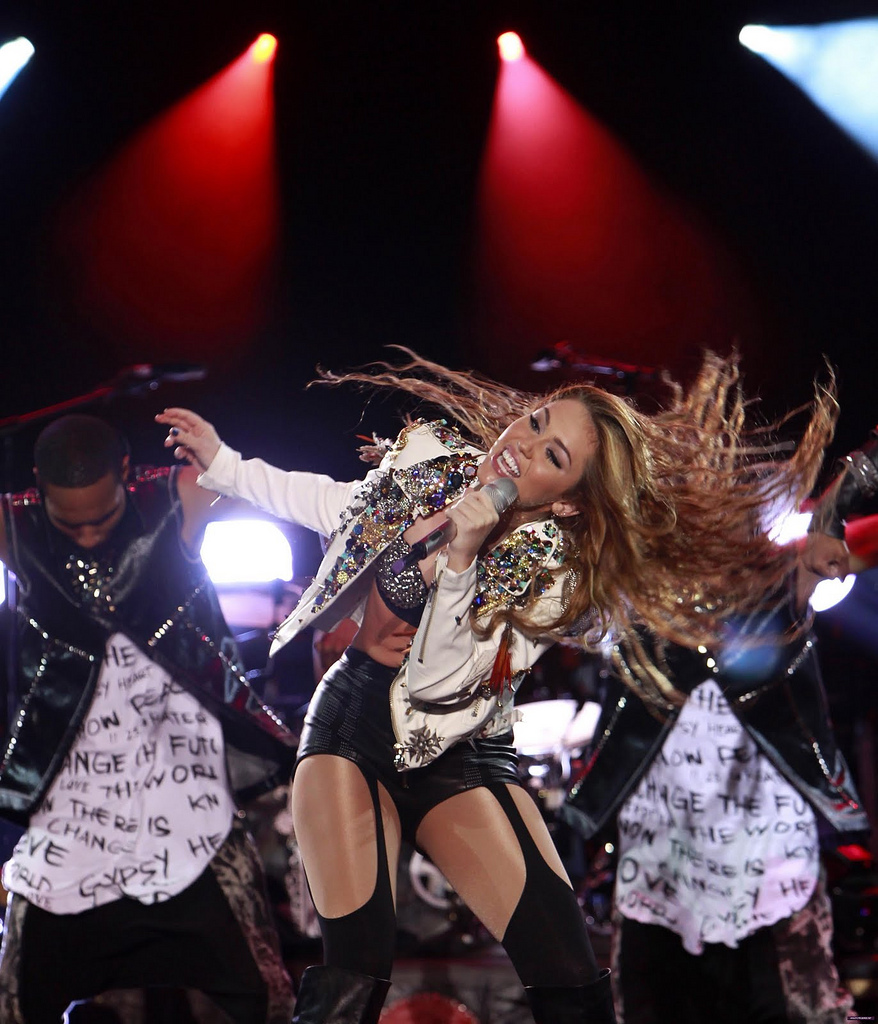
Cyrus performing at her Gypsy Heart Tour in 2011

American singer, songwriter, and actress Miley Cyrus has appeared in music videos, films, television series and video games. From 2006 to 2011, Cyrus grew into mega popularity after starring in the Disney Channel television series Hannah Montana as Miley Stewart and her alter ego, Hannah Montana. In 2009, Cyrus starred in the show's feature film Hannah Montana: The Movie, whose soundtrack included her lead single "The Climb". Her other films included voicing the role of Penny in the animated film Bolt in 2008, The Last Song with Liam Hemsworth in 2010, LOL with Demi Moore and So Undercover, both in 2012. Her song "When I Look at You" was part of The Last Song soundtrack with the music video directed by the film's producer, Adam Shankman. She has released 39 music videos and appeared on 12 music videos.

In 2007, Cyrus released her first official music video for the second single "Start All Over" of her debut album Meet Miley Cyrus, the second disc of the dual album Hannah Montana 2: Meet Miley Cyrus. Her second music video for "7 Things", was the lead single from her second studio album Breakout. She then released music videos for her songs "Fly on the Wall" (2008), and "Party in the U.S.A." (2009), which won the MuchMusic Video Award for Best International Artist Video.

In 2010, to transition Cyrus away from the "good-girl" image she had developed through Hannah Montana, she released music videos for the singles "Can't Be Tamed" and "Who Owns My Heart" from her third studio album Can't Be Tamed. Both videos were directed by Robert Hales. She went on to cover the song "You're Gonna Make Me Lonesome When You Go" for the tribute album Chimes of Freedom and released a music video with Johnzo West. In 2013, Cyrus released the music videos "We Can't Stop", "Wrecking Ball", and "Adore You" from her fourth studio album Bangerz. The music video for "Wrecking Ball" won the 2014 MTV Video Music Award for Video of the Year.

Cyrus has made guest appearances in other artists' music videos including Metro Station's "Seventeen Forever" in 2009, Rock Mafia's "The Big Bang" in 2010, Borgore's "Decisions" in 2012, and Future's "Real and True" and will.i.am's "Feelin' Myself" in 2013. She was also both featured as a vocalist and appeared in the videos for "Ashtrays and Heartbreaks" by Snoop Dogg and "23" by Mike Will Made It in 2013.

== Music videos ==
Key
‡	Indicates videos directed or co-directed by Miley Cyrus

Title	Year	Performer(s)	Director(s)	Ref(s)
"Start All Over"	2007	Miley Cyrus	Marc Webb	
"7 Things"	2008	Miley Cyrus	Brett Ratner	
"Fly on the Wall"	2008	Miley Cyrus	Philip Andelman	
"The Climb"	2009	Miley Cyrus	Matthew Rolston	
"Send It On"	2009	Disney's Friends for Change	Michael Blum and Tracy Pion	
"Party in the U.S.A."	2009	Miley Cyrus	Chris Applebaum	
"Everybody Hurts"	2010	Helping Haiti	Joseph Kahn	
"We Are the World 25 for Haiti"	2010	Artists for Haiti	Paul Haggis	
"When I Look at You"	2010	Miley Cyrus	Adam Shankman	
"Can't Be Tamed"	2010	Miley Cyrus	Robert Hales	
"Who Owns My Heart"	2010	Miley Cyrus	Robert Hales	
"You're Gonna Make Me Lonesome When You Go"	2012	Miley Cyrus featuring Johnzo West	James Minchin III	
"Decisions"	2012	Borgore featuring Miley Cyrus	Christian Lamb	
"Ashtrays and Heartbreaks"	2013	Snoop Lion featuring Miley Cyrus	P. R. Brown	
"We Can't Stop"	2013	Miley Cyrus	Diane Martel	
"Wrecking Ball"	2013	Miley Cyrus	Terry Richardson	
"23"	2013	Mike Will Made It featuring Miley Cyrus, Wiz Khalifa and Juicy J	Hannah Lux Davis	
"Real and True"	2013	Future and Miley Cyrus featuring Mr Hudson	Rankin	
"Feelin' Myself"	2013	will.i.am featuring Miley Cyrus, French Montana, Wiz Khalifa and DJ Mustard	Pasha Shapiro	
"Adore You"	2013	Miley Cyrus	Rankin	
"Dooo It!"	2015	Miley Cyrus	Unknown	
"Lighter"	2015	Miley Cyrus	Miley Cyrus and Wayne Coyne	
"BB Talk"	2015	Miley Cyrus	Miley Cyrus and Diane Martel	
"Malibu"	2017	Miley Cyrus	Miley Cyrus and Diane Martel	
"Younger Now"	2017	Miley Cyrus	Miley Cyrus and Diane Martel	
"Nothing Breaks Like a Heart"	2018	Mark Ronson featuring Miley Cyrus	We Are from L.A.	
"On a Roll"	2019	Ashley O	Anne Sewitsky	
"Mother's Daughter"	2019	Miley Cyrus	Alexandre Moors	
"Slide Away"	2019	Miley Cyrus	Alexandre Moors	
"Don't Call Me Angel"	2019	Ariana Grande, Miley Cyrus and Lana Del Rey	Hannah Lux Davis	
"Midnight Sky"	2020	Miley Cyrus	Miley Cyrus	
"Prisoner"	2020	Miley Cyrus featuring Dua Lipa	Miley Cyrus and Alana O'Herlihy	
"Angels like You"	2021	Miley Cyrus	Miley Cyrus and Alana O'Herlihy	
"Without You" (Remix)	2021	The Kid Laroi and Miley Cyrus	Miley Cyrus	
"Flowers"	2023	Miley Cyrus	Jacob Bixenman	
"River"	2023	Miley Cyrus	Jacob Bixenman	
"Jaded"	2023	Miley Cyrus	Jacob Bixenman	
"Used to Be Young"	2023	Miley Cyrus	Jacob Bixenman and Brendan Walter	
"Doctor (Work It Out)"	2024	Pharrell Williams and Miley Cyrus	Jacob Bixenman	
"Prelude"	2025	Miley Cyrus	Miley Cyrus, Jacob Bixenman and Brendan Walter	
"Something Beautiful"	2025	Miley Cyrus	Miley Cyrus, Jacob Bixenman and Brendan Walter	
"End of the World"	2025	Miley Cyrus	Miley Cyrus, Jacob Bixenman and Brendan Walter	
"More to Lose"	2025	Miley Cyrus	Miley Cyrus, Jacob Bixenman and Brendan Walter	
"Easy Lover"	2025	Miley Cyrus	Miley Cyrus, Jacob Bixenman and Brendan Walter	
"Every Girl You've Ever Loved"	2025	Miley Cyrus featuring Naomi Campbell	Miley Cyrus, Jacob Bixenman and Brendan Walter	
"Walk of Fame"	2025	Miley Cyrus featuring Brittany Howard	Miley Cyrus, Jacob Bixenman and Brendan Walter	
"Secrets"	2025	Miley Cyrus featuring Lindsey Buckingham and Mick Fleetwood	Miley Cyrus, Jacob Bixenman and Brendan Walter	
"Dream as One"	2025	Miley Cyrus	Glen Luchford	

=== Guest appearances ===
Title	Year	Performer(s)	Director(s)	Ref(s)
"If Heartaches Had Wings"	2003	Rhonda Vincent	Unknown	
"Ready, Set, Don't Go"	2007	Billy Ray Cyrus	Elliot Lester	
"Seventeen Forever"	2008	Metro Station	Josh Forbes	
"Last Song"	2010	Dave Days	Dave Days	
"The Big Bang"	2010	Rock Mafia	Unknown	
"Twisted"	2013	Tiffany Foxx featuring Lil Kim	Jonathan Andrade	
"Juice"	2013	KPTN	Unknown	
"Fire"	2013	Big Sean	Jack Heller and Matthew Williams	
"Bitch"	2014	Lolawolf	Trevor Andrew	
"Come Get It Bae"	2014	Pharrell Williams	Luis Cerveró	
"Like It Bic"	2015	Rae Sremmurd	Max Hliva	
"Drinks On Us"	2015	Mike Will Made It featuring Swae Lee and Future	Matt Swinsky	
"Bitch I'm Madonna"	2015	Madonna featuring Nicki Minaj	Jonas Åkerlund	
"All I Want for Christmas Is You" (Festive Lambs Edition)	2023	Mariah Carey	Unknown	

== Video albums ==
Title	Album details	Peak chart positions				Certifications
Title	Album details	US	AUS	ITA	UK	Certifications
Best of Both Worlds Concert	Released: August 19, 2008; Label: Walt Disney; Format: DVD · Blu-ray	—	—	—	1	BPI: Gold
Can't Be Tamed Mini DVD	Released: June 18, 2010; Label: Hollywood; Format: DVD	—	—	—	4	
Bangerz Tour	Released: March 23, 2015; Label: RCA; Format: DVD · Blu-ray	1	1	1	2	

== Commercials ==
Year	Promoting	Description	Ref.
2003	Banquet Homebake Styles creamy chicken & biscuit	Promotes Banquet's Homestyle Creamy Chicken and Biscuit Bake.	
2005 – 2010	Hannah Montana commercials	Promotes the Hannah Montana show on the Disney Channel.	
2008	Dannon Danimals commercial	Promotes Dannon Danimals yogurt.	
2009	Disney's Friends for Change	Promotes cleaning up the environment (3 commercials).	
2009	Miley Cyrus & Max Azria	Promotes Cyrus and Max Azria's clothing line at Walmart.	
2010	Ink It Pink	Promotes the fight against breast cancer	
2011	Japan Relief	Promotes helping those affected by the 2011 Japan earthquake and tsunami.	
2011	Help Haiti Home	Promotes J/P Haitian Relief Organization.	
2011–2021	Saturday Night Live ('s weekly promotions)	Weekly commercials that promoted Miley's turn as host &/or musical guest on SNL in 2011, 2013, 2015, 2017, 2018 & 2021.	
2012	Feeding America	Illustrates American hunger.	
2012	Rock the Vote	Encourages young people to vote.	
2013	2013 MTV Video Music Awards	Promotes Cyrus' performance at the 2013 MTV Video Music Awards.	
2013	2013 MTV Europe Music Awards	Promotes Cyrus' performance at the 2013 MTV Europe Music Awards.	
2014	NRJ	Promotes NRJ radio station.	
2014	2014 MTV Video Music Awards	Promotes Cyrus at the 2014 MTV Video Music Awards.	
2014	Golden Lady	Promotes Rock Your Legs leggings by Golden Lady.	
2015	2015 MTV Video Music Awards	Promotes Cyrus at the 2015 MTV Video Music Awards.	
2016	The Voice US (season 10) commercial	Promotes Miley's debut as a coach on the tenth season of the USA version of The Voice	
2017	2017 Billboard Music Awards	Promotes Cyrus at the 2017 Billboard Music Awards.	
2017	Converse	Promotes Cyrus' collaboration with Converse sneakers.	
2021	Hers Skincare Line	Promotes new Hers skincare line.	
2021	Gucci Frangance Flora Gardenia	Promotes Gucci Perfum "Flora Gardenia".	
2022	T-Mobile Super Bowl Commercial	Promotes T-Mobile communications company at Super Bowl LVI	
2024	Gucci Fragance Flora	Promotes Gucci Perfum "Flora Gorgeous Orchid".	

== Filmography ==
Key
†	Denotes films or shows that have not yet been released
‡	Indicates a cameo appearance

=== Narrative ===
==== Film ====
Year	Title	Role	Notes	Ref.
2003	Big Fish	Ruthie	Credited as Destiny Cyrus	
2008	Bolt	Penny	Voice	
2009	Hannah Montana: The Movie	Miley Stewart / Hannah Montana		
2010	The Last Song	Veronica "Ronnie" Miller		
2010	Sex and the City 2	Herself ‡		
2012	LOL	Lola Williams		
2012	So Undercover	Molly Morris / Brooke Stonebridge		
2014	Miley Cyrus: Tongue Tied	Herself	Short film	
2015	The Night Before	Herself ‡		
2015	A Very Murray Christmas	Herself ‡		
2017	Guardians of the Galaxy Vol. 2	Mainframe ‡		
2024	Drive-Away Dolls	Tiffany Plastercaster ‡	Uncredited	
2025	Something Beautiful	Herself	Co-directed and co-written with Jacob Bixenman and Brendan Walter; also producer	

==== Television ====
Year	Title	Role	Notes	Ref.
2001, 2003	Doc	Kylie	3 episodes; credited as Destiny Cyrus	
2006–2011	Hannah Montana	Miley Stewart / Hannah Montana	Main role; 98 episodes	
2006	The Suite Life of Zack & Cody	Miley Stewart / Hannah Montana	Episode: "That's So Suite Life of Hannah Montana"	
2007–2008	The Emperor's New School	Yatta	Voice; 11 episodes	
2007	The Replacements	Celebrity Starr	Voice; episode: "The Frog Prince"	
2007	High School Musical 2	Girl at Pool ‡	Television film	
2009	The Suite Life on Deck	Miley Stewart / Hannah Montana	Episode: "Double-Crossed"	
2012	Two and a Half Men	Missi	2 episodes	
2015	Stone Quackers	Skateboarding Pigeon	Voice; episode: "A Farewell to Kings/The Bug Show"	
2016	Crisis in Six Scenes	Lennie Dale	Miniseries; 5 episodes	
2019	Black Mirror	Ashley O / Ashley Too	Episode: "Rachel, Jack and Ashley Too"	
2022	Dolly Parton's Mountain Magic Christmas	Herself	Television film	
2023	Human Resources	Van	Voice; 5 episodes	
2026	Sesame Street	Herself	Episode: "Elmo's Toy Swap"	

=== Non-narrative ===
==== Concert film ====
Year	Title	Credited as		Notes	Ref.
Year	Title	Actor	Exec. producer	Notes	Ref.
2007	Hannah Montana: Live in London	Yes	No	Television special	
2008	Hannah Montana and Miley Cyrus: Best of Both Worlds Concert	Yes	No		
2010	Miley Cyrus: Live from London	Yes	No	Television special	
2011	Justin Bieber: Never Say Never	Yes	No	Guest performance	
2014	Miley Cyrus: MTV Unplugged	Yes	No	Television special	
2014	Miley Cyrus: Bangerz Tour	Yes	Yes	Television special	
2020	MTV Unplugged Presents: Miley Cyrus Backyard Sessions	Yes	No	Television special	
2021	Miley Cyrus Presents Stand By You	Yes	No	Television special	
2023	Endless Summer Vacation (Backyard Sessions)	Yes	Yes	Disney+ special	
2023	Endless Summer Vacation: Continued (Backyard Sessions)	Yes	Yes	Television special	

==== Documentary film ====
Year	Title	Credited as		Notes	Ref.
Year	Title	Actor	Exec. producer	Notes	Ref.
2013	Miley: The Movement	Yes	Yes	Television film	
2015	Jeremy Scott: The People's Designer	Yes	No		
2018	Bad Reputation	Yes	No		
2025	Ladies & Gentlemen... 50 Years of SNL Music	Yes	No	Television film	

==== Television ====
Year	Title	Credited as		Role	Notes	Ref.
Year	Title	Actor	Exec. producer	Role	Notes	Ref.
2007	Billy Ray Cyrus: Home at Last	Yes	No	Herself		
2008	Extreme Makeover: Home Edition	Yes	No	Herself	Episode: "The Gilyeat Family"	
2008	Studio DC: Almost Live	Yes	No	Herself	Television special	
2008	2008 Teen Choice Awards	Yes	No	Host	Television special	
2008	FNMTV Presents: A Miley-Sized Surprise	Yes	No	Herself	Television special	
2009	Food Network Challenge	Yes	No	Herself	Episode: "Miley Cyrus' Sweet 16 Cake"	
2009	Dreams Come True: A Celebration of Disney Animation	Yes	No	Herself	Television special	
2010	American Idol	Yes	No	Guest mentor	Episode: "Top 11 Performance"	
2010	2010 MuchMusic Video Awards	Yes	No	Co-host	Television special	
2010	Dolly Celebrates 25 Years of Dollywood	Yes	No	Herself	Television special	
2011–2021	Saturday Night Live	Yes	No	Host / musical guest / various	9 episodes	
2012	Punk'd	Yes	No	Herself	2 episodes	
2013	Dolly Parton: Song by Song	Yes	No	Herself	6 episodes	
2013	The Real Change Project: Artists for Education	Yes	No	Herself	Television special	
2013	Styled to Rock	Yes	No	Herself	Episode: "Miley’s Sexy Night Out"	
2014	Cause For Paws: An All Star Dog Spectacular	Yes	No	Herself	Television special	
2015	Saturday Night Live 40th Anniversary Special	Yes	No	Herself	Television special	
2015	2015 MTV Video Music Awards	Yes	No	Host	Television special	
2015	The All-Star Dog Rescue Celebration	Yes	No	Herself	Television special	
2016–2017	The Voice	Yes	No	Guest mentor (season 10) / Coach (season 11 and 13)	55 episodes	
2017	Cyrus vs. Cyrus: Design and Conquer	Yes	No	Herself	Episode: "Family is Everything"	
2019	RuPaul's Drag Race	Yes	No	Guest judge	Episode: "Whatcha Unpackin?"	
2021	Miley's New Year's Eve Party	Yes	Yes	Co-host	Television special; hosted with Pete Davidson	
2022	Miley's New Year's Eve Party	Yes	Yes	Co-host	Television special; hosted with Dolly Parton	
2025	Saturday Night Live 50th Anniversary Special	Yes	No	Herself	Television special	
2026	Hannah Montana 20th Anniversary Special	Yes	Yes	Herself	Television special	

== Video games ==
Year	Title	Role
2006	Hannah Montana	Miley Stewart / Hannah Montana
2007	Hannah Montana Spotlight World Tour	Miley Stewart / Hannah Montana
2007	Hannah Montana: Music Jam	Miley Stewart / Hannah Montana
2009	Hannah Montana: The Movie	Miley Stewart / Hannah Montana
2009	Hannah Montana: Rock Out the Show	Miley Stewart / Hannah Montana
