= List of awards and nominations received by Miley Cyrus =

Miley Cyrus awards and nominations
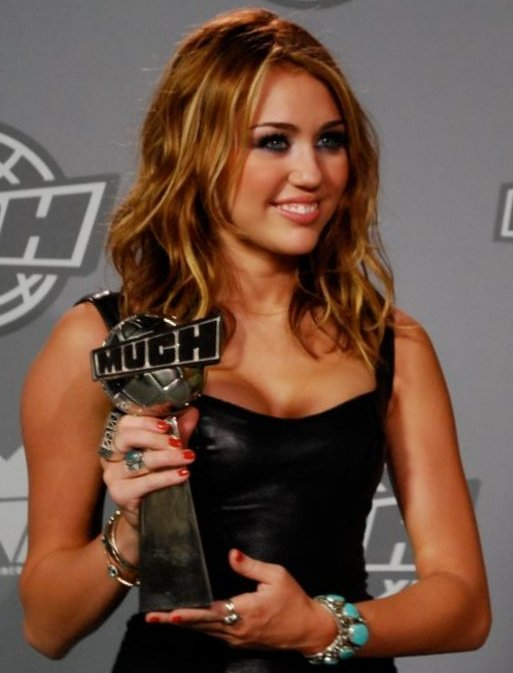
- Cyrus at the 2010 MuchMusic Video Awards with her award for Best International Artist Video
Awards and nominations
Award	Wins	Nominations
American Music Awards	0	2
Billboard Music Awards	5	20
Golden Globe Awards	0	3
Grammy Awards	3	11
MTV Europe Music Awards	2	20
MTV Movie Awards	1	2
MTV Video Music Awards	3	26
People's Choice Awards	1	11
Satellite Awards	1	2
Teen Choice Awards	19	50
World Music Awards	4	16
Young Artist Award	1	4

Totals (Note: Certain award groups do not simply award one winner. They acknowledge several different recipients, have runners-up, and have third place. Since this is a specific recognition and is different from losing an award, runner-up mentions are considered wins in this award tally. For simplification and to avoid errors, each award in this list has been presumed to have had a prior nomination.)
- Wins: 134
- Nominations: 416

Miley Cyrus is an American singer, songwriter, and actor. Cyrus rose to prominence for starring as the title character in the Disney Channel series Hannah Montana. Cyrus has released eight studio albums Meet Miley Cyrus (2007), Breakout (2008), Can't Be Tamed (2010), Bangerz (2013), Miley Cyrus & Her Dead Petz (2015), Younger Now (2017), Plastic Hearts (2020), and Endless Summer Vacation (2023) and she released the EP The Time of Our Lives (2009). In 2008, Cyrus was nominated for a Golden Globe for Best Original Song and won the MTV Movie Award for Best Song From A Movie with her song "The Climb" in 2009. She received 16 nominations at the World Music Awards in 2014 and 50 Teen Choice Award nominations from 2006 to 2014, making her the most nominated person in the history of the Teen Choice Awards. In 2024, she won her first two Grammy Awards at the 66th Annual Grammy Awards.

== Major associations ==
=== Golden Globe Awards ===
Year	Category	Nominated Work	Result	Ref.
2009	"I Thought I Lost You"	Best Original Song	Nominated	
2025	"Beautiful That Way"	Best Original Song	Nominated	
2026	"Dream As One"	Best Original Song	Nominated	

=== Grammy Awards ===
Year	Category	Nominated Work	Result	Ref.
2015	Bangerz	Best Pop Vocal Album	Nominated	
2022	Montero (Note: As a featured artist and songwriter.)	Album of the Year	Nominated	
2024	"Flowers"	Record of the Year	Won	
2024	"Flowers"	Song of the Year	Nominated	
2024	"Flowers"	Best Pop Solo Performance	Won	
2024	Endless Summer Vacation	Album of the Year	Nominated	
2024	Endless Summer Vacation	Best Pop Vocal Album	Nominated	
2024	"Thousand Miles" (featuring Brandi Carlile)	Best Pop Duo/Group Performance	Nominated	
2025	"II Most Wanted" (with Beyoncé)	Best Country Duo/Group Performance	Won	
2026	Something Beautiful	Best Pop Vocal Album	Nominated	
2027	"Light of a Clear Blue Morning" (with Dolly Parton, Lainey Wilson, Queen Latifah and Reba McEntire)	Best Country Duo/Group Performance	Pending	

== Other associations ==
Award	Year (Note: Indicates the year of ceremony. Each year is linked to the article about the awards held that year, wherever possible.)	Recipient(s) and nominee(s)	Category	Result	Ref.
American Music Awards	2009	Hannah Montana: The Movie Soundtrack	Favorite Soundtrack	Nominated	
American Music Awards	2009	Hannah Montana Season 3 Soundtrack	Favorite Soundtrack	Nominated	
AmfAR	2015	Miley Cyrus	Inspiration Award	Won	
APRA Music Awards	2020	"Nothing Breaks Like a Heart" (Mark Ronson featuring Miley Cyrus)	Most Performed International Work	Nominated	
APRA Music Awards	2024	"Flowers"	Most Performed International Work	Nominated	
ARIA Music Awards	2021	Plastic Hearts	Best International Artist	Nominated	
ARIA Music Awards	2021	"Without You" (with The Kid Laroi)	Song of the Year	Nominated	
Australian Commercial Radio Awards	2023	"Flowers"	Most Played New Song on Commercial Radio	Won	
Bambi Award	2013	Miley Cyrus	Best International Pop	Won	
BBC Radio 1's Lockdown Awards	2020	Miley Cyrus covering Billie Eilish in the Live Lounge	Best Live Performance	Nominated	
BBC Radio 1's Lockdown Awards	2020	Miley Cyrus' bad internet connection	Zoom Fail	Nominated	
Billboard.com Mid-Year Music Awards	2013	"We Can't Stop"	Best Music Video	Won	
Billboard.com Mid-Year Music Awards	2013	Miley Cyrus	Best Comeback	Won	
Billboard.com Mid-Year Music Awards	2013	Miley Cyrus	Best Style	Won	
Billboard.com Mid-Year Music Awards	2014	Miley Cyrus	Best Style	Nominated	
Billboard Music Awards	2014	"Wrecking Ball"	Top Hot 100 Song	Nominated	
Billboard Music Awards	2014	"Wrecking Ball"	Top Streaming Song (Video)	Won	
Billboard Music Awards	2014	"We Can't Stop"	Top Streaming Song (Video)	Nominated	
Billboard Music Awards	2014	Miley Cyrus	Top Artist	Nominated	
Billboard Music Awards	2014	Miley Cyrus	Top Female Artist	Nominated	
Billboard Music Awards	2014	Miley Cyrus	Top Hot 100 Artist	Nominated	
Billboard Music Awards	2014	Miley Cyrus	Top Digital Songs Artist	Nominated	
Billboard Music Awards	2014	Miley Cyrus	Top Streaming Artist	Won	
Billboard Music Awards	2014	Miley Cyrus	Top Social Artist	Nominated	
Billboard Music Awards	2015	Miley Cyrus	Top Social Artist	Nominated	
Billboard Music Awards	2021	Plastic Hearts	Top Rock Album	Nominated	
Billboard Music Awards	2023	Miley Cyrus	Top Female Artist	Nominated	
Billboard Music Awards	2023	Miley Cyrus	Top Radio Songs Artist	Nominated	
Billboard Music Awards	2023	Miley Cyrus	Top Song Sales Artist	Nominated	
Billboard Music Awards	2023	"Flowers"	Top Hot 100 Song	Nominated	
Billboard Music Awards	2023	"Flowers"	Top Streaming Song	Nominated	
Billboard Music Awards	2023	"Flowers"	Top Radio Song	Won	
Billboard Music Awards	2023	"Flowers"	Top Selling Song	Nominated	
Billboard Music Awards	2023	"Flowers"	Top Billboard Global 200 Song	Won	
Billboard Music Awards	2023	"Flowers"	Top Billboard Global (Excl. U.S.) Song	Won	
Billboard Touring Awards	2008	Miley Cyrus	Breakthrough Act	Won	
BMI London Awards	2011	"Can't Be Tamed"	Award-Winning Songs (Note: Awards and nominations Cyrus has received as songwriter.)	Won	
BMI Pop Awards	2009	"See You Again"	Most-Performed Songs of the Year	Won	
BMI Pop Awards	2015	"We Can't Stop"	Most-Performed Songs of the Year	Won	
BMI Pop Awards	2018	"Malibu"	Most-Performed Songs of the Year	Won	
BMI Pop Awards	2021	"Midnight Sky"	Most-Performed Songs of the Year	Won	
BMI Pop Awards	2021	"Without You"	Most-Performed Songs of the Year	Won	
BMI Pop Awards	2024	"Flowers"	Song of the Year	Won	
BMI Pop Awards	2024	"Flowers"	Most-Performed Songs of the Year	Won	
BMI Pop Awards	2024	"Jaded"	Most-Performed Songs of the Year	Won	
BMI Pop Awards	2025	"Used to Be Young"	Most-Performed Songs of the Year	Won	
BMI R&B/Hip-Hop Awards	2015	"23"	Most Performed R&B/Hip-Hop Songs	Won	
Bravo Otto	2007	Miley Cyrus	TV star female	Bronze	
Bravo Otto	2008	Miley Cyrus	Singer	Gold	
Bravo Otto	2008	Miley Cyrus	TV Star	Silver	
Bravo Otto	2009	Miley Cyrus	Super Singer	Bronze	
Bravo Otto	2009	Miley Cyrus	Super TV Star	Gold	
Bravo Otto	2009	Miley Cyrus	Super Movie Star	Nominated	
Bravo Otto	2010	Miley Cyrus	Super Female Singer	Nominated	
Bravo Otto	2010	Miley Cyrus	Super Movie Star	Gold	
Bravo Otto	2010	Miley Cyrus	Super Female TV Star	Nominated	
Bravo Otto	2011	Miley Cyrus	Super Female Singer	Nominated	
Bravo Otto	2011	Miley Cyrus	Super Female TV Star	Nominated	
Bravo Otto	2011	Miley Cyrus	Super Female Movie Star	Nominated	
Bravo Otto	2012	Miley Cyrus	Super Female Movie Star	Nominated	
Bravo Otto	2013	Miley Cyrus	Superstar	Nominated	
Bravo Otto	2013	Miley Cyrus	Sexy Babe	Nominated	
Bravo Otto	2013	Miley Cyrus & Britney Spears	Super-BFFs	Nominated	
Bravo Otto	2019	Miley Cyrus	International Female Singer	Nominated	
Bravo Otto	2023	Miley Cyrus	International Artist	Nominated	
Brit Awards	2020	"Nothing Breaks Like a Heart" (Mark Ronson featuring Miley Cyrus)	Song of the Year	Nominated	
Brit Awards	2021	Miley Cyrus	International Female Solo Artist	Nominated	
Brit Awards	2024	Miley Cyrus	International Artist of the Year	Nominated	
Brit Awards	2024	"Flowers"	Best International Song	Won	
British LGBT Awards	2015	Miley Cyrus	Music Artists	Nominated	
British LGBT Awards	2017	Miley Cyrus	Music Artists	Nominated	
British LGBT Awards	2017	Happy Hippie Foundation	Top 10 Solidarity initiatives	Nominated	
Buenos Aires Music Video Festival	2021	"Midnight Sky"	Video Pop	Nominated	
City of Hope	2009	Miley Cyrus	Spirit of Life Award	Won	
Clio Awards	2014	VEVO Tour Exposed: Miley Cyrus-Bangerz	Music Marketing	Bronze	
Clio Awards	2020	"Mother's Daughter"	Music Videos	Bronze	
Critics' Choice Movie Awards	2009	"I Thought I Lost You" (with Jeffrey Steele)	Best Song	Nominated	
Critics' Choice Movie Awards	2025	"Beautiful That Way"	Best Song	Nominated	
Danish Music Awards	2023	Endless Summer Vacation	International Album of the Year	Nominated	
Danish Music Awards	2023	"Flowers"	International Hit of the Year	Won	
Disney Legends	2024	Miley Cyrus	Disney Legend	Won	
Do Something Awards	2012	Miley Cyrus	Twitter	Nominated	
Emma Gaala	2024	"Flowers"	Most Streamed International Song of the Year	Won	
GAFFA Awards (Denmark)	2013	Miley Cyrus	International Female Artist of the Year	Nominated	
GAFFA Awards (Denmark)	2024	Endless Summer Vacation	International Album of the Year	Won	
GAFFA Awards (Denmark)	2024	"Flowers"	International Hit of the Year	Won	
GAFFA Awards (Sweden)	2013	Miley Cyrus	International New Artist of the Year	Won	
GAFFA Awards (Sweden)	2024	"Flowers"	International Song of the Year	Nominated	
Gaygalan Awards	2024	"Flowers"	Song of the Year	Nominated	
GLAAD Media Awards	2016	Miley Cyrus & Her Dead Petz	Outstanding Music Artist	Nominated	
GLAAD Media Awards	2018	Younger Now	Outstanding Music Artist	Nominated	
GLAAD Media Awards	2021	Plastic Hearts	Outstanding Music Artist	Nominated	
GLAAD Media Awards	2024	Endless Summer Vacation	Outstanding Music Artist	Nominated	
Global Awards	2024	"Flowers"	Best Song	Nominated	
Global Awards	2024	Miley Cyrus	Best Female	Nominated	
Global Awards	2024	Miley Cyrus	Best Pop	Nominated	
Global Action Awards	2011	Miley Cyrus	Global Action Youth Leadership Award	Won	
Golden Raspberry Awards	2009	Hannah Montana: The Movie	Worst Actress	Nominated	
Golden Raspberry Awards	2010	The Last Song	Worst Actress	Nominated	
Gracie Awards	2008	Hannah Montana	Outstanding Female Lead - Comedy Series (Children/Adolescent)	Won	
Gracie Awards	2009	Hannah Montana	Outstanding Female Lead - Comedy Series (Children/Adolescent)	Won	
Guild of Music Supervisors Awards	2020	"Don't Call Me Angel" (with Ariana Grande and Lana Del Rey)	Song Written and/or Recorded for a Film	Nominated	
Hit FM Music Awards	2024	"Flowers"	Top 10 Singles	Won	
Hit FM Music Awards	2024	"Used to Be Young"	Top 10 Singles	Nominated	
Hit FM Music Awards	2024	Miley Cyrus	Female Artist of the Year	Nominated	
Hit FM Music Awards	2025	"II Most Wanted" (with Beyoncé)	Collaboration of the Year	Nominated	
Hit FM Music Awards	2025	"II Most Wanted" (with Beyoncé)	Top 10 Singles	Nominated	
Hollywood Music in Media Awards	2024	"Beautiful That Way"	Best Original Song in an Independent Film	Won	
Hollywood Music in Media Awards	2025	"Dream As One"	Best Original Song in a Feature Film	Nominated	
Houston Film Critics Society	2008	"I Thought I Lost You" (with Jeffrey Steele)	Best Original Song	Nominated	
Hungarian Music Awards	2024	"Endless Summer Vacation"	International Modern Pop/Rock Album or Recording of the Year	Won	
IFPI Awards	2024	"Flowers"	IFPI Global Single Award of 2023	Won	
iHeartRadio Music Awards	2014	"Wrecking Ball"	Best Lyrics	Won	
iHeartRadio Music Awards	2018	"Malibu"	Best Music Video	Nominated	
iHeartRadio Music Awards	2018	Pig Pig	Cutest Musician's Pet	Nominated	
iHeartRadio Music Awards	2018	Miley Cyrus	Best Fan Army	Nominated	
iHeartRadio Music Awards	2020	"Black Dog"	Best Cover Song	Nominated	
iHeartRadio Music Awards	2021	"Heart of Glass"	Best Cover Song	Nominated	
iHeartRadio Music Awards	2022	"Nothing Else Matters"	Best Cover Song	Nominated	
iHeartRadio Music Awards	2024	Miley Cyrus	Artist of the Year	Nominated	
iHeartRadio Music Awards	2024	Miley Cyrus	Pop Artist of the Year	Nominated	
iHeartRadio Music Awards	2024	"Flowers"	Song of the Year	Nominated	
iHeartRadio Music Awards	2024	"Flowers"	Pop Song of the Year	Won	
iHeartRadio Music Awards	2024	"Flowers"	Best Music Video	Nominated	
iHeartRadio Music Awards	2024	"Flowers"	Best Lyrics	Nominated	
iHeartRadio Music Awards	2026	Miley Cyrus	iHeartRadio Innovator	Won	
iHeartRadio Titanium Award	2023	"Flowers"	1 Billion Total iHeartRadio Audience Spins	Won	
Japan Gold Disc Awards	2024	"Flowers"	Song of the Year by Streaming (Western music)	Won	
KKBox Music Awards	2024	Miley Cyrus	100 Top Artists	Won	
Las Vegas Film Critics Society	2024	"Beautiful That Way"	Best Song	Won	
LiveXLive's Lockdown Awards (Note: The Lockdown Awards presented by LiveXLive is an award focuses on performances that took place virtually or in large outdoor areas during the COVID-19 pandemic.)	2020	Talk Show Host “BrightMinded”	Musicians Not Playing Music	Nominated	
LOS40 Music Awards	2014	"Wrecking Ball"	Best International Song	Nominated	
LOS40 Music Awards	2014	"Wrecking Ball"	Best International Video	Nominated	
LOS40 Music Awards	2019	Miley Cyrus	International Artist of the Year	Nominated	
LOS40 Music Awards	2023	Miley Cyrus	Best International Artist	Nominated	
LOS40 Music Awards	2023	Endless Summer Vacation	Best International Album	Nominated	
LOS40 Music Awards	2023	"Flowers"	Best International Song	Nominated	
LOS40 Music Awards	2025	Miley Cyrus	Best International Artist	Nominated	
Los Premios MTV Latinoamérica	2009	Miley Cyrus	Best Pop Artist — International	Nominated	
Los Premios MTV Latinoamérica	2009	Miley Cyrus	Fashionista Award — Female	Nominated	
Lunas del Auditorio	2015	Miley Cyrus	Best Foreign Pop	Nominated	
Make-A-Wish Foundation	2012	Miley Cyrus	World Wish Day Star Award	Won	
MTV Africa Music Awards	2014	Miley Cyrus	Best International Act	Nominated	
MTV Europe Music Awards	2008	Miley Cyrus	Best New Act	Nominated	
MTV Europe Music Awards	2010	Miley Cyrus	Best Female	Nominated	
MTV Europe Music Awards	2010	Miley Cyrus	Best Pop	Nominated	
MTV Europe Music Awards	2013	Miley Cyrus	Best Pop	Nominated	
MTV Europe Music Awards	2013	Miley Cyrus	Best Female	Nominated	
MTV Europe Music Awards	2013	Miley Cyrus	Best US Act	Won	
MTV Europe Music Awards	2013	Miley Cyrus	Best North American Act	Nominated	
MTV Europe Music Awards	2013	"Wrecking Ball"	Best Video	Won	
MTV Europe Music Awards	2014	Miley Cyrus	Best Pop	Nominated	
MTV Europe Music Awards	2015	Miley Cyrus	Best Female	Nominated	
MTV Europe Music Awards	2017	Miley Cyrus	Best Artist	Nominated	
MTV Europe Music Awards	2017	Miley Cyrus	Best Pop	Nominated	
MTV Europe Music Awards	2019	Miley Cyrus	Best Artist	Nominated	
MTV Europe Music Awards	2019	"Nothing Breaks Like a Heart" (with Mark Ronson)	Best Collaboration	Nominated	
MTV Europe Music Awards	2020	Miley Cyrus	Best Artist	Nominated	
MTV Europe Music Awards	2020	Miley Cyrus	Best US Act	Nominated	
MTV Europe Music Awards	2023	Miley Cyrus	Best Artist	Nominated	
MTV Europe Music Awards	2023	Miley Cyrus	Best Pop	Nominated	
MTV Europe Music Awards	2023	"Flowers"	Best Song	Nominated	
MTV Europe Music Awards	2023	"Flowers"	Best Video	Nominated	
MTV Italian Music Awards	2014	Miley Cyrus	Wonder Woman	Nominated	
MTV Italian Music Awards	2014	Miley Cyrus	Twitstar	Nominated	
MTV Italian Music Awards	2014	"Wrecking Ball"	Best Video	Nominated	
MTV Italian Music Awards	2014	Miley Cyrus	Artist Saga	Nominated	
MTV Italian Music Awards	2015	Miley Cyrus	Top Instagram Star	Nominated	
MTV Italian Music Awards	2015	Miley Cyrus	Artist Saga	Nominated	
MTV Italian Music Awards	2016	Miley Cyrus	Artist Saga	Nominated	
MTV Italian Music Awards	2017	Miley Cyrus	Artist Saga	Nominated	
MTV Italian Music Awards	2017	Miley Cyrus	MTV Awards Star	Nominated	
MTV MIAW Awards	2014	Miley Cyrus	Global Instagram Star	Won	
MTV MIAW Awards	2015	Miley and the Mexican Flag	Epic Fail	Nominated	
MTV MIAW Awards	2015	Miley Cyrus	Instagramer of the Year	Nominated	
MTV MIAW Awards	2023	"Flowers"	Global Hit of the Year	Nominated	
MTV Millennial Awards Brazil	2021	"Midnight Sky"	Global Hit	Nominated	
MTV Millennial Awards Brazil	2021	"Prisoner" (featuring Dua Lipa)	International Collaboration	Nominated	
MTV Movie & TV Awards	2009	"The Climb"	Best Song From A Movie	Won	
MTV Movie & TV Awards	2009	Hannah Montana: The Movie	Breakthrough Performance Female	Nominated	
MTV Video Music Awards	2008	"7 Things"	Best New Artist	Nominated	
MTV Video Music Awards	2009	"7 Things"	Best Editing	Nominated	
MTV Video Music Awards	2013	"We Can't Stop"	Best Editing	Nominated	
MTV Video Music Awards	2013	"We Can't Stop"	Best Pop Video	Nominated	
MTV Video Music Awards	2013	"We Can't Stop"	Best Female Video	Nominated	
MTV Video Music Awards	2013	"We Can't Stop"	Song of Summer	Nominated	
MTV Video Music Awards	2014	"Wrecking Ball"	Video of the Year	Won	
MTV Video Music Awards	2014	"Wrecking Ball"	Best Direction	Nominated	
MTV Video Music Awards	2017	"Malibu"	Best Pop Video	Nominated	
MTV Video Music Awards	2019	"Mother's Daughter"	Best Power Anthem	Nominated	
MTV Video Music Awards	2019	"Mother's Daughter"	Best Song of the Summer	Nominated	
MTV Video Music Awards	2020	"Mother's Daughter"	Best Art Direction	Won	
MTV Video Music Awards	2020	"Mother's Daughter"	Best Editing	Won	
MTV Video Music Awards	2020	"Midnight Sky"	Best Song of the Summer	Nominated	
MTV Video Music Awards	2021	"Prisoner" (featuring Dua Lipa)	Best Collaboration	Nominated	
MTV Video Music Awards	2021	"Prisoner" (featuring Dua Lipa)	Best Editing	Nominated	
MTV Video Music Awards	2023	"Flowers"	Video of the Year	Nominated	
MTV Video Music Awards	2023	"Flowers"	Song of the Year	Nominated	
MTV Video Music Awards	2023	"Flowers"	Best Pop	Nominated	
MTV Video Music Awards	2023	"Flowers"	Best Cinematography	Nominated	
MTV Video Music Awards	2023	"River"	Best Editing	Nominated	
MTV Video Music Awards	2023	Endless Summer Vacation	Album of the Year	Nominated	
MTV Video Music Awards	2025	Miley Cyrus	Best Pop Artist	Nominated	
MTV Video Music Awards	2025	Something Beautiful	Best Long Form Video	Nominated	
MTV Video Music Awards	2025	"Easy Lover"	Best Cinematography	Nominated	
MTV Video Music Awards	2025	"End of the World"	Best Art Direction	Nominated	
MTV Video Music Awards Japan	2014	"We Can't Stop"	Best Female Video	Won	
MTV Video Music Awards Japan	2014	"Ashtrays and Heartbreaks" (with Snoop Lion)	Best Reggae Video	Nominated	
MuchMusic Video Awards	2008	"Start All Over"	Best International Artist Video	Nominated	
MuchMusic Video Awards	2009	"The Climb"	Best International Artist Video	Nominated	
MuchMusic Video Awards	2010	"Party in the U.S.A."	Best International Artist Video	Won	
MuchMusic Video Awards	2010	"Party in the U.S.A."	Ur Fave International Video	Nominated	
MuchMusic Video Awards	2014	Miley Cyrus	Your Fave International Artist/Group	Nominated	
MuchMusic Video Awards	2014	"Wrecking Ball"	International Video of the Year – Artist	Nominated	
Musa Awards	2023	Miley Cyrus	International Anglo Act of the Year	Nominated	
Musa Awards	2023	"Flowers"	International Anglo Song of the Year	Won	
Music Week Awards	2024	Miley Cyrus & RCA/Sony Music	Artist Marketing Campaign	Nominated	
MYX Music Awards	2009	"7 Things"	Favorite International Music Video	Nominated	
MYX Music Awards	2010	"The Climb"	Favorite International Video	Nominated	
MYX Music Awards	2014	"Wrecking Ball"	Favorite International Video	Nominated	
Nickelodeon Argentina Kids' Choice Awards	2011	Miley Cyrus	Favorite International Singer	Nominated	
Nickelodeon Australian Kids' Choice Awards	2008	Miley Cyrus	Fave International Singer	Won	
Nickelodeon Australian Kids' Choice Awards	2008	Miley Cyrus	Fave International TV Star	Won	
Nickelodeon Australian Kids' Choice Awards	2009	Miley Cyrus	Fave International TV Star	Nominated	
Nickelodeon Australian Kids' Choice Awards	2009	Miley Cyrus	Fave International Singer	Nominated	
Nickelodeon Australian Kids' Choice Awards	2010	The Last Song	Fave Movie Star	Won	
Nickelodeon Australian Kids' Choice Awards	2010	The Last Song (with Liam Hemsworth)	Fave Kiss	Won	
Nickelodeon Australian Kids' Choice Awards	2010	Miley Cyrus and Liam Hemsworth	Cutest Couple	Nominated	
Nickelodeon Kids' Choice Awards	2007	Hannah Montana	Favorite TV Actress	Won	
Nickelodeon Kids' Choice Awards	2008	Hannah Montana	Favorite TV Actress	Won	
Nickelodeon Kids' Choice Awards	2008	Miley Cyrus	Favorite Female Singer	Won	
Nickelodeon Kids' Choice Awards	2009	Miley Cyrus	Favorite Female Singer	Won	
Nickelodeon Kids' Choice Awards	2009	Bolt	Favorite Voice from an Animated Movie	Nominated	
Nickelodeon Kids' Choice Awards	2009	Hannah Montana	Favorite TV Actress	Nominated	
Nickelodeon Kids' Choice Awards	2010	Hannah Montana	Favorite TV Actress	Nominated	
Nickelodeon Kids' Choice Awards	2010	"Party in the U.S.A."	Favorite Song	Nominated	
Nickelodeon Kids' Choice Awards	2010	Hannah Montana: The Movie	Favorite Movie Actress	Won	
Nickelodeon Kids' Choice Awards	2010	Miley Cyrus	Favorite Female Singer	Nominated	
Nickelodeon Kids' Choice Awards	2011	Miley Cyrus	Favorite Female Singer	Nominated	
Nickelodeon Kids' Choice Awards	2011	Hannah Montana	Favorite TV Actress	Nominated	
Nickelodeon Kids' Choice Awards	2011	The Last Song	Favorite Movie Actress	Won	
Nickelodeon Kids' Choice Awards	2014	"Wrecking Ball"	Favorite Song	Nominated	
Nickelodeon Kids' Choice Awards	2024	Miley Cyrus	Favorite Female Artist	Nominated	
Nickelodeon Kids' Choice Awards	2024	"Flowers"	Favorite Song	Nominated	
Nickelodeon Kids' Choice Awards	2024	Endless Summer Vacation	Favorite Album	Nominated	
Nickelodeon Kids' Choice Awards	2024	"Doctor (Work It Out)"	Favorite Music Collaboration	Nominated	
Nickelodeon Kids' Choice Awards	2026	Miley Cyrus	Favorite Female Artist	Pending	
Nickelodeon Kids' Choice Awards	2026	"Dream as One"	Favorite Song from a Movie	Pending	
Nickelodeon Mexico Kids' Choice Awards	2010	Hannah Montana	Favorite International Female Character	Nominated	
Nickelodeon Mexico Kids' Choice Awards	2023	Miley Cyrus	Favourite Global Artist	Nominated	
Nickelodeon Mexico Kids' Choice Awards	2023	"Flowers"	Global Hit of the Year	Nominated	
Nickelodeon UK Kids' Choice Awards	2007	Hannah Montana	Best TV Actress	Nominated	
Nickelodeon UK Kids' Choice Awards	2008	Hannah Montana	Favorite Female TV Star	Won	
New Music Awards	2009	Miley Cyrus	AC Female Artist of the Year	Won	
New Music Awards	2024	Miley Cyrus	AC Female Artist of the Year	Nominated	
New Music Awards	2024	Miley Cyrus	Top40/CHR Female Artist of the Year	Nominated	
NewNowNext Awards	2013	Miley Cyrus	Best New 'Do	Nominated	
NME Awards	2014	Miley Cyrus	Villain of the Year	Nominated	
NRJ Music Awards	2013	Miley Cyrus	Best Female International	Nominated	
NRJ Music Awards	2013	"Wrecking Ball"	Best Video of the Year	Nominated	
NRJ Music Awards	2017	Miley Cyrus	International Female Artist of the Year	Nominated	
NRJ Music Awards	2020	Miley Cyrus	International Female Artist of the Year	Nominated	
NRJ Music Awards	2023	Miley Cyrus	International Female Artist of the Year	Nominated	
NRJ Music Awards	2023	"Flowers"	International Song of the Year	Won	
NRJ Music Awards	2023	"Flowers"	International Video of the Year	Won	
NRJ Music Awards	2025	Miley Cyrus	International Female Artist of the Year	Nominated	
NRJ Music Awards	2026	"Dream as One"	International Hit of the Year	Pending	
NR1 Video Müzik Ödülleri	2026	Miley Cyrus	Best Foreign Artist	Pending	
People's Choice Country Awards	2024	"II Most Wanted" (with Beyoncé)	The Crossover Song of 2024	Nominated	
Palm Springs International Film Festival	2026	"Dream as One"	Outstanding Artistic Achievement Award	Won	
People's Choice Awards	2010	Miley Cyrus	Favorite Breakout Movie Actress	Won	
People's Choice Awards	2010	Miley Cyrus	Favorite Web Celeb	Nominated	
People's Choice Awards	2014	Bangerz	Favorite Album	Nominated	
People's Choice Awards	2014	"Wrecking Ball"	Favorite Music Video	Nominated	
People's Choice Awards	2019	Miley Cyrus	Female Artist of the Year	Nominated	
People's Choice Awards	2019	Miley Cyrus	Social Celebrity of the Year	Nominated	
People's Choice Awards	2020	Miley Cyrus	Female Artist of the Year	Nominated	
People's Choice Awards	2024	Miley Cyrus	The Female Artist of the Year	Nominated	
People's Choice Awards	2024	Miley Cyrus	The Pop Artist of the Year	Nominated	
People's Choice Awards	2024	Endless Summer Vacation	The Album of the Year	Nominated	
People's Choice Awards	2024	"Flowers"	The Song of the Year	Nominated	
PETA's Libby Awards	2016	Miley Cyrus	Best Voice for Animals	Won	
PETA's Libby Awards	2017	Miley Cyrus	Best Voice for Animals	Won	
Population Matters Awards	2024	Miley Cyrus	Family Choice Champion	Won	
Premios Odeón	2024	"Flowers"	Best International Song	Won	
Qmusic Q-Pop Awards	2023	"Flowers"	International Hit of the Year	Won	
Qmusic Top 40 Awards	2024	"Flowers"	Biggest International Hit	Won	
Queerties Awards	2023	"Boys Don't Cry (Live)" (Anitta with Miley Cyrus)	Anthem	Nominated	
Queerties Awards	2024	"River"	Music Video	Nominated	
Radio Disney Music Awards	2006	"The Best of Both Worlds"	Best Song	Won	
Radio Disney Music Awards	2006	Miley Cyrus	Best New Artist	Won	
Radio Disney Music Awards	2006	Miley Cyrus	Best Female Singe	Won	
Radio Disney Music Awards	2006	"I Got Nerve"	Best Song to Listen to While Getting Ready for School	Won	
Radio Disney Music Awards	2006	Miley Cyrus	Favorite TV Star Who Sings	Won	
Radio Disney Music Awards	2006	Miley Cyrus	Most Stylish Singer	Won	
Radio Disney Music Awards	2006	"The Best of Both Worlds"	Best Song to Put on Repeat	Won	
Radio Disney Music Awards	2007	Miley Cyrus	Best Female Artist	Nominated	
Radio Disney Music Awards	2007	"See You Again"	Best Song	Nominated	
Radio Disney Music Awards	2007	Miley Cyrus	Most Stylish Singer	Nominated	
Rockbjörnen	2023	"Flowers"	International Song of the Year	Won	
RTHK International Pop Poll Awards	2019	"Nothing Breaks Like a Heart" (Mark Ronson featuring Miley Cyrus)	Top Ten International Gold Songs	Nominated	
RTHK International Pop Poll Awards	2023	Miley Cyrus	Top Female Singers	Bronze	
RTHK International Pop Poll Awards	2023	"Flowers"	Top Ten International Gold Songs	Won	
RTHK International Pop Poll Awards	2023	"Used to Be Young"	Top Ten International Gold Songs	Nominated	
RTHK International Pop Poll Awards	2024	Miley Cyrus	Top Female Singers	Nominated	
RTHK International Pop Poll Awards	2024	"II Most Wanted"	Top Ten International Gold Songs	Nominated	
Satellite Awards	2019	"Don't Call Me Angel" (with Ariana Grande and Lana Del Rey)	Best Original Song	Nominated	
Satellite Awards	2026	"Dream as One"	Best Original Song	Won	
Shorty Awards	2012	Miley Cyrus	Celebrity	Nominated	
Shorty Awards	2012	Miley Cyrus	Actress	Nominated	
Shorty Awards	2012	Miley Cyrus	Singer	Nominated	
Shorty Awards	2013	Miley Cyrus	Celebrity	Nominated	
Shorty Awards	2018	Miley Cyrus	Celebrity	Nominated	
Shorty Awards	2022	Chipotle Mexican Grill X Miley Cyrus	TikTok Partnership	Won	
Shorty Awards	2022	Chipotle Mexican Grill X Miley Cyrus	Real Time Response	Bronze	
Society of Composers & Lyricists Awards	2025	"Beautiful That Way"	Outstanding Original Song for a Dramatic or Documentary Visual Media Production	Nominated	
Swiss Music Awards	2024	Miley Cyrus	Best Solo Act – International	Won	
Swiss Music Awards	2024	"Flowers"	Best Hit – International	Won	
Teen Choice Awards	2006	Hannah Montana	Choice TV: Breakout Star	Nominated	
Teen Choice Awards	2007	Hannah Montana	Choice TV Actress: Comedy	Won	
Teen Choice Awards	2008	Hannah Montana	Choice TV Actress: Comedy	Won	
Teen Choice Awards	2008	Miley Cyrus	Choice Music: Female Artist	Won	
Teen Choice Awards	2008	Miley Cyrus	Choice Most Fanatic Fans	Nominated	
Teen Choice Awards	2008	"See You Again"	Choice Music: Single	Nominated	
Teen Choice Awards	2008	"7 Things"	Choice Summer: Song	Nominated	
Teen Choice Awards	2009	"Before the Storm"	Choice Summer: Single	Won	
Teen Choice Awards	2009	Miley Cyrus	Choice Music: Female Artist	Nominated	
Teen Choice Awards	2009	Hannah Montana	Choice TV Actress – Comedy	Won	
Teen Choice Awards	2009	Hannah Montana: The Movie	Choice Movie: Liplock	Nominated	
Teen Choice Awards	2009	Hannah Montana: The Movie	Choice Movie Actress: Music/Dance	Won	
Teen Choice Awards	2009	Hannah Montana: The Movie	Choice Movie: Hissy Fit	Won	
Teen Choice Awards	2009	Miley Cyrus	Choice Female Hottie	Nominated	
Teen Choice Awards	2009	Miley Cyrus	Choice Celebrity Dancer: Female	Nominated	
Teen Choice Awards	2009	Miley Cyrus	Choice Red Carpet Icon: Female	Nominated	
Teen Choice Awards	2009	"The Climb"	Choice Music: Single	Won	
Teen Choice Awards	2010	The Last Song	Choice Movie Actress: Drama	Won	
Teen Choice Awards	2010	The Last Song	Choice Movie: Chemistry	Nominated	
Teen Choice Awards	2010	The Last Song	Choice Movie: Liplock	Nominated	
Teen Choice Awards	2010	The Last Song	Choice Movie: Hissy Fit	Won	
Teen Choice Awards	2010	The Last Song (with Liam Hemsworth)	Choice Movie: Dance	Nominated	
Teen Choice Awards	2010	Miley Cyrus and Max Azria	Choice Fashion: Celebrity Fashion Line	Won	
Teen Choice Awards	2010	Miley Cyrus	Choice Red Carpet Fashion Icon: Female	Nominated	
Teen Choice Awards	2010	Miley Cyrus	Choice Fanatic Fans	Nominated	
Teen Choice Awards	2010	Miley Cyrus	Choice Music: Female Artist	Nominated	
Teen Choice Awards	2010	"When I Look at You"	Choice Music: Love Song	Won	
Teen Choice Awards	2010	"Can't Be Tamed"	Choice Music: Single	Nominated	
Teen Choice Awards	2010	Miley Cyrus	Choice Music: Female Summer Artist	Nominated	
Teen Choice Awards	2011	Hannah Montana	Choice TV Actress – Comedy	Nominated	
Teen Choice Awards	2011	Miley Cyrus	Choice Red Carpet Icon: Female	Nominated	
Teen Choice Awards	2012	Miley Cyrus	Choice Female Hottie	Won	
Teen Choice Awards	2012	Miley Cyrus	Choice Twit	Nominated	
Teen Choice Awards	2012	Miley Cyrus	Choice Fashion Icon: Female	Nominated	
Teen Choice Awards	2012	LOL	Actress Romance	Nominated	
Teen Choice Awards	2013	Miley Cyrus	Choice Female Hottie	Nominated	
Teen Choice Awards	2013	Miley Cyrus	Candie's Choice Style Icon	Won	
Teen Choice Awards	2013	Miley Cyrus	Choice Summer Music Star: Female	Nominated	
Teen Choice Awards	2013	Miley Cyrus	Candie's Fashion Trendsetter	Won	
Teen Choice Awards	2013	"We Can't Stop"	Choice Single: Female Artist	Nominated	
Teen Choice Awards	2013	"We Can't Stop"	Choice Summer Song	Won	
Teen Choice Awards	2013	Two and a Half Men	Choice TV Female Scene Stealer	Won	
Teen Choice Awards	2014	Miley Cyrus	Choice Female Artist	Nominated	
Teen Choice Awards	2014	Miley Cyrus	Choice Instagrammer	Won	
Teen Choice Awards	2017	Miley Cyrus	Ultimate Choice Award	Won	
Teen Choice Awards	2017	Miley Cyrus	Choice Female Artist	Nominated	
Teen Choice Awards	2017	Miley Cyrus	Choice Summer Female Artist	Nominated	
Teen Choice Awards	2017	"Malibu"	Choice Female Song	Nominated	
Teen Choice Awards	2017	"Malibu"	Choice Summer Song	Nominated	
Teen Choice Awards	2017	Miley Cyrus	Choice Fandom	Nominated	
Telehit Awards	2011	Miley Cyrus	International Youth Artist	Nominated	
Telehit Awards	2013	Miley Cyrus	Most Popular Artist on Telehit	Nominated	
Telehit Awards	2013	"We Can't Stop"	Most Popular Video on Telehit	Nominated	
Telehit Awards	2014	"Adore You"	Most Popular Video on Telehit	Nominated	
UK Music Video Awards	2013	"We Can't Stop"	Best Pop Video - International	Nominated	
UK Music Video Awards	2019	"Nothing Breaks Like a Heart" (Mark Ronson featuring Miley Cyrus)	Best Pop Video - UK	Nominated	
Variety Awards	2016	Happy Hippie Foundation	Power of Women Award	Won	
Virgin Media Music Awards	2011	"Can't Be Tamed"	Best Video	Won	
Webby Awards	2020	Miley Cyrus	Webby Special Achievement	Won	
World Music Awards	2014	"23"	World's Best Song	Nominated	
World Music Awards	2014	"Adore You"	World's Best Song	Nominated	
World Music Awards	2014	"Fall Down" (with will.i.am)	World's Best Song	Nominated	
World Music Awards	2014	"We Can't Stop"	World's Best Song	Nominated	
World Music Awards	2014	"Wrecking Ball"	World's Best Song	Nominated	
World Music Awards	2014	Bangerz	World's Best Album	Nominated	
World Music Awards	2014	"23"	World's Best Video	Nominated	
World Music Awards	2014	"Adore You"	World's Best Video	Nominated	
World Music Awards	2014	"Fall Down" (with will.i.am)	World's Best Video	Nominated	
World Music Awards	2014	"We Can't Stop"	World's Best Video	Nominated	
World Music Awards	2014	"Wrecking Ball"	World's Best Video	Won	
World Music Awards	2014	Miley Cyrus	World's Best Female Artist	Won	
World Music Awards	2014	Miley Cyrus	World's Best Pop/Rock Artist	Won	
World Music Awards	2014	Miley Cyrus	World's Best Live Act	Nominated	
World Music Awards	2014	Miley Cyrus	World's Best Entertainer of the Year	Nominated	
World Music Awards	2014	Miley Cyrus	World's Most Talked About Artist on Facebook	Won	
World Soundtrack Awards	2025	"Beautiful That Way"	Best Original Song	Nominated	
Young Artist Awards	2008	Hannah Montana	Best Performance in a TV Series – Leading Young Actress	Won	
Young Artist Awards	2008	Hannah Montana	Best Young Ensemble Performance in a TV Series	Nominated	
Young Artist Awards	2009	Hannah Montana	Best Performance in a TV Series – Leading Young Actress	Nominated	
Young Artist Awards	2010	Hannah Montana	Best Performance in a TV Series – Leading Young Actress	Nominated	
YouTube Music Awards	2013	"We Can't Stop"	Video of the Year	Nominated	
YouTube Music Awards	2015	Miley Cyrus	50 Artists to Watch	Won	
Žebřík Music Awards	2024	"Flowers"	Foreign Song	Nominated	
Žebřík Music Awards	2024	Miley Cyrus	Foreign Female Artist	Bronze	
Ziggo Dome Awards	2014	Bangerz Tour	Best Goosebumps Moment	Won	

== Other accolades ==
=== World records ===
Key
†	Indicates a now former world record holder

Name of publication, year the record was awarded, name of the record, and the name of the record holder
Publication	Year	World record	Record holder	Ref.
Guinness World Records	2006	Most entries simultaneously in the US top 100 in one week	Hannah Montana (Miley Cyrus)	
Guinness World Records	2006	† Most new entries in the Billboard Hot 100	Miley Cyrus	
Guinness World Records	2008	Highest grossing film of a music tour	Hannah (Miley Cyrus): Best of Both Worlds Tour	
Guinness World Records	2008	Highest annual earnings for a child actor	Miley Cyrus	
Guinness World Records	2009	Most charted teenager (USA)	Miley Cyrus	
Guinness World Records	2015	Most searched-for Pop Star on the Internet	Miley Cyrus	
Guinness World Records	2023	Most streamed track on Spotify in one week	"Flowers"	
Guinness World Records	2023	Most monthly listeners on Spotify (female)	Miley Cyrus	

=== Listicles ===
Name of publisher, name of listicle, year(s) listed, and placement result
Publisher	Listicle	Year(s)	Result	Ref.
Billboard	Greatest of All Time Billboard 200 Women Artists	2017	9th	
Billboard	The 100 Best Deep Cuts by 21st Century Pop Stars	2017	49th ("Lighter")	
Billboard	The 100 Best Deep Cuts by 21st Century Pop Stars	2017	93rd ("Rooting for My Baby")	
Billboard	Billboard's 100 Best Songs of 2017	2017	75th ("Malibu")	
Billboard	Greatest of All Time Artists	2019	62nd	
Billboard	Billboard's Top Artists of the 2010s	2019	55th	
Billboard	The 100 Greatest Albums of the 2010s	2019	91st ("Bangerz")	
Billboard	The 100 Greatest Music Video Artists of All Time	2020	33rd	
Billboard	The 100 Greatest Song Bridges of the 21st Century	2021	43rd ("We Can't Stop")	
Billboard	The 100 Greatest Disneyverse Songs of All Time	2023	8th ("The Climb")	
Billboard	The 100 Greatest Disneyverse Songs of All Time	2023	58th ("The Best of Both Worlds")	
Billboard	The 100 Greatest Disneyverse Songs of All Time	2023	80th ("Send It On")	
Billboard	The 100 Best Songs of 2023	2023	4th ("Flowers")	
Billboard	The 100 Best Songs of 2023	2023	81st ("Used to Be Young")	
Billboard	Greatest Pop Stars of the 21st Century	2024	15th	
Brandwatch	Most Influential People on Twitter	2019	20th	
Brandwatch	Most Influential People on Twitter	2022	19th	
Comic Book Resources	10 Most Successful Actors From 2000s Kids' Shows	2022	7th	
Forbes	30 Under 30	2014	Placed	
Forbes	30 Under 30	2021	Placed	
Rolling Stone	50 Most Inspirational LGBTQ+ Anthems of All Time	2023	25th ("The Climb")	
Time	Time 100	2008	Placed	
Time	Time 100	2014	Placed	
