= Backyard Sessions =

Series of music performances by Miley Cyrus

The Backyard Sessions are a series of music performances by American singer Miley Cyrus. The first sessions featured Cyrus performing cover versions of classic songs in an outdoor setting, and were released in 2012. Subsequent sessions have since been released in support of Cyrus' own projects, including the launch of her Happy Hippie Foundation in 2015 and the release of her albums Plastic Hearts (2020) and Endless Summer Vacation (2023).

== The Backyard Sessions (2012) ==
The first series was released on YouTube between September and December 2012, and showed Cyrus performing covers of classic songs with her band in an outdoor setting. The sessions began in September 2012 when Cyrus posted a video of her singing James Shelton's song "Lilac Wine". MTV explains the setting of the Backyard sessions by stating "She's also shown sitting down with her band in a serene garden space as she sings huskily into a standing mic." The second session was posted in October 2012 as Cyrus performed the Melanie Safka song "Look What They've Done To My Song Ma". The third and final video posted of the original sessions featured Cyrus singing "Jolene", originally performed and written by her godmother, Dolly Parton.

=== List of performances ===
Date	Song	Original artist	Ref.
September 6, 2012	"Lilac Wine"	Eartha Kitt	
October 4, 2012	"Look What They've Done to My Song Ma"	Melanie	
December 24, 2012	"Jolene"	Dolly Parton	

== Happy Hippie Presents Backyard Sessions (2015) ==
Backyard Sessions logo

In 2015, Cyrus released a new set of Backyard Sessions videos to publicize the launch of the Happy Hippie Foundation. On May 6, the first daily video was posted to social media, with Cyrus joined by Joan Jett in covering Jett's 2013 song "Different". In a second video posted later that day, Cyrus covered Dido's "No Freedom", dedicated to Leelah Alcorn, a teenage transgender girl who killed herself by walking out in front of traffic the previous December. Two more videos were posted on May 9, 2015. In the first, Cyrus performed "Androgynous" by The Replacements alongside Jett and Against Me! frontwoman Laura Jane Grace, who came out as transgender in 2012. In the fourth installment of the Happy Hippie Backyards Sessions, Cyrus provided backing vocals for Grace's performance of the Against Me! song "True Trans Soul Rebel".

In videos posted May 12, Cyrus was joined by Melanie Safka for performances of "Peace Will Come (All According to Plan)" and "What Have They Done to My Song Ma," as covered in the original Backyards Sessions videos. On performing with Cyrus, Safka commented that Cyrus showed "only the part she wanted me to see," but added that she was "very accommodating" and "totally real [...] Her heart is really in the music. The true test of character, for me, is if your heart is in the music." Safka credited the videos with an increase in young people at her concerts. Safka also performed a rendition of "Yaw Baby (Break My Heart)" while Cyrus watched in the background.

In a May 15 video, Cyrus was joined by Ariana Grande for a cover of "Don't Dream It's Over" by Crowded House. Cyrus wore a unicorn onesie, while Grande wore a mouse onesie. The pair reprised the performance at the One Love Manchester benefit concert organized by Grande in June 2017.

In two videos posted on May 19, Cyrus performed covers of "Happy Together" by The Turtles, and Paul Simon's "50 Ways to Leave Your Lover". In the final video, released May 23, she sang "Pablow the Blowfish" in memory of her recently deceased pet fish. The song later appeared on Miley Cyrus & Her Dead Petz (2015).

=== List of performances ===
Date	Song	Original artist	Ref.
May 6, 2015	"Different" (featuring Joan Jett)	Joan Jett and the Blackhearts	
May 6, 2015	"No Freedom"	Dido	
May 9, 2015	"Androgynous" (featuring Joan Jett, Laura Jane Grace, and Atom Willard)	The Replacements	
May 9, 2015	"True Trans Soul Rebel" (featuring Laura Jane Grace and Atom Willard)	Against Me!	
May 12, 2015	"Peace Will Come (According to Plan)"	Melanie	
May 12, 2015	"Yaw Baby (Break My Heart)" (featuring Melanie)	Melanie	
May 12, 2015	"Look What They've Done to My Song Ma"	Melanie	
May 15, 2015	"Don't Dream It's Over" (featuring Ariana Grande)	Crowded House	
May 19, 2015	"Happy Together"	The Turtles	
May 19, 2015	"50 Ways to Leave Your Lover"	Paul Simon	
May 23, 2015	"Pablow the Blowfish"	Miley Cyrus	

== MTV Unplugged Presents: Miley Cyrus Backyard Sessions (2020) ==
MTV Unplugged Presents: Miley Cyrus Backyard Sessions
- MTV Unplugged episode
- Original air date: October 16, 2020
- Running time: 26 minutes

Guest appearance
- Noah Cyrus

Episode chronology
← Previous "Fobia"	Next → "BTS"

On October 16, 2020, Cyrus premiered a full Backyard Sessions concert on MTV. Her band called themselves "Miley Cyrus and the Social Distancers," and all members except the singers wore masks in performance. On October 17, she posted six concert videos to her YouTube channel. Four were covers: "Gimme More" by Britney Spears, "Communication" by The Cardigans, "Sweet Jane" by the Velvet Underground, and "Just Breathe" by Pearl Jam. She also posted a live version of her song "Midnight Sky" from her album Plastic Hearts and a duet with her sister Noah Cyrus of Noah's song "I Got So High That I Saw Jesus." During the concert, she also performed a cover of Jackson Browne's "These Days," but this was not uploaded to Cyrus's channel in October.

=== List of performances ===
Date	Song	Original artist	Ref.
October 16, 2020	"Gimme More"	Britney Spears	
October 16, 2020	"I Got So High That I Saw Jesus" (featuring Noah Cyrus)	Noah Cyrus	
October 16, 2020	"Midnight Sky"	Miley Cyrus	
October 16, 2020	"Sweet Jane"	The Velvet Underground	
October 16, 2020	"Communication"	The Cardigans	
October 16, 2020	"Just Breathe"	Pearl Jam	
October 16, 2020	"These Days"	Nico	

== Apple Music Backyard Sessions (2020) ==
Furthermore, upon the release of her seventh studio album Plastic Hearts, Cyrus also released a second edition of the album onto Apple Music. This edition included four videos for the backyard sessions for a few of the newly released songs, namely "High", "Plastic Hearts", "Golden G String" and "Angels like You".

=== List of performances ===
Date	Song	Ref.
November 27, 2020	"High"	
November 27, 2020	"Plastic Hearts"	
November 27, 2020	"Golden G String"	
November 27, 2020	"Angels like You"	

== Endless Summer Vacation (Backyard Sessions) (2023) ==
The concert special Endless Summer Vacation (Backyard Sessions) was released on Disney+ on March 10, 2023, in promotion of the release of Cyrus' eighth studio album Endless Summer Vacation (2023). The special featured performances of eight songs from the new album, and a special performance of "The Climb". An updated version titled Endless Summer Vacation: Continued (Backyard Sessions) aired on ABC on August 24, 2023, before the release of Cyrus' single "Used to Be Young" the next day.

Date	Song	Ref.
March 10, 2023	"Jaded"	
March 10, 2023	"Rose Colored Lenses"	
March 10, 2023	"Thousand Miles"	
March 10, 2023	"Wildcard"	
March 10, 2023	"Island"	
March 10, 2023	"Wonder Woman" (with Rufus Wainwright on piano)	
March 10, 2023	"The Climb"	
March 10, 2023	"River"	
March 10, 2023	"Flowers"	
