= 1000 Miles =

1000 Miles may refer to:

== Music ==
- "1000 Miles" (Grinspoon song)
- "1000 Miles" (H.E.A.T song)
- "Thousand Miles" (Destine song)
- "Thousand Miles" (The Kid Laroi song)
- "Thousand Miles", a song by Miley Cyrus from Endless Summer Vacation, 2023
- "A Thousand Miles", Vanessa Carlton song
- "1000 Miles Away", 1991 song by Australian rock group Hoodoo Gurus
- 1000 Miles Per Hour

== Books ==
- A Thousand Miles to Freedom: My Escape from North Korea, by Eunsun Kim

== See also ==
- Rally 1000 Miglia or Rally 1000 Miles, a 1000-mile rally race
- 500 Miles (disambiguation)
