= Kim Eun-sun =

Kim Eun-sun may refer to:

- Kim Eun-sun (footballer) (born 1988), South Korean footballer
- Kim Eun-sun (conductor) (born 1980), South Korean conductor and music director
- one of the authors of the book A Thousand Miles to Freedom
