= 500 Miles (disambiguation) =

500 Miles may refer to:

- "500 Miles", or "500 Miles Away from Home", a song made popular in the U.S. and Europe during the 1960s folk revival
- "I'm Gonna Be (500 Miles)", a 1988 song by The Proclaimers
- "500 Miles", a song by Tori Amos from the 2009 album Abnormally Attracted to Sin
- Five Hundred Miles (film), a 2023 Chinese film
- 500 Miles Away from Home (album), a 1963 album by Bobby Bare
- 500 Miles (film), a 2026 English-language film

== See also ==
- "500 Miles High", a 1973 jazz fusion song by Chick Corea and Return to Forever
- 500 Miles High (album), a 1974 album by Flora Purim
- 500 Miles to Memphis, an Americana punk band
- Race of Two Worlds, or 500 Miles of Monza, an Italian automobile race 1957 and 1958
