= Endless Summer Vacation =

2023 studio album by Miley Cyrus

Studio album by Miley Cyrus
- Released: March 10, 2023
- Recorded: 2021–2022
- Studios: The Cave (Nashville); Coffer Family BBQ (London); Dr. Preuss (Los Angeles); Larrabee (Los Angeles); No Expectations (Los Angeles); The Ribcage (Los Angeles); Ridgemont (Los Angeles); Ridgemont High (Los Angeles)
- Genres: Pop; dance-pop
- Length: 39:44
- Label: Columbia
- Producers: Kid Harpoon; Tyler Johnson; Greg Kurstin; Mike Will Made It; Jay Moon; Maxx Morando; Jesse Shatkin; Max Taylor-Sheppard; Jerome Williams; BJ Burton; Jonny Coffer; Zwiffa

Miley Cyrus chronology
| Attention: Miley Live (2022) | Endless Summer Vacation (2023) | Something Beautiful (2025) |

Singles from Endless Summer Vacation
- 1. "Flowers" Released: January 12, 2023; 2. "River" Released: March 13, 2023; 3. "Jaded" Released: April 17, 2023

Singles from Endless Summer Vacation (Digital reissue)
- 1. "Used to Be Young" Released: August 25, 2023

Endless Summer Vacation is the eighth studio album by American singer and songwriter Miley Cyrus. It was released on March 10, 2023, via Columbia Records. It is her first new body of work since leaving RCA Records after her seventh studio album, Plastic Hearts (2020), and signing with Columbia in early 2021. A pop and dance-pop record, Endless Summer Vacation is a shift from the synth-pop, rock, and glam rock genres that features on Plastic Hearts. Cyrus related its overall concept to her affection for Los Angeles, California, where the album was mainly recorded, and its track sequencing to the course of a day. Brandi Carlile and Sia are featured as guest vocalists.

The album was supported by three singles. The lead single, "Flowers", set several streaming and chart records and spent eight weeks atop the US Billboard Hot 100, marking Cyrus' second number-one in the country, and topped the charts in 36 other countries. The second and third singles —"River" and "Jaded"— followed in March and April, respectively. The digital edition of the album that features the fourth single, "Used to Be Young", was released in August 2023. With its release, Endless Summer Vacation became Cyrus's first album to feature multiple US top-ten singles since Bangerz (2013).

Upon its release, Endless Summer Vacation received praise from music critics, who complimented its production, commercial appeal, and Cyrus' vocal performance. Commercially, it reached number-one in ten countries and the top 10 in 17 countries. The album was nominated for Album of the Year and Best Pop Vocal Album at the 66th Annual Grammy Awards, whilst "Flowers" won Record of the Year and Best Pop Solo Performance.

Cyrus performed eight of the twelve tracks for the Disney+ documentary concert special, Endless Summer Vacation (Backyard Sessions), which was released on the same day as the album. An updated version of the special was broadcast on ABC on August 24, 2023, and was released on Hulu the day after.

== Background and recording ==
After ending her eight-year contract with RCA, Miley Cyrus signed with Columbia Records in March 2021. Her first releases with the label were a remix of the Kid Laroi's "Without You", and the live album, Attention: Miley Live, between April 2021 and April 2022, respectively. In an article published in October 2021, Billboard confirmed that Cyrus was working on her next album. The album was described as "her love letter to LA" that represents the physical and mental growth she experienced during production.

Cyrus wrote several songs with Michael Pollack and Gregory "Aldae" Hein. They were conceived only with piano, then evolving into their final versions. Pollack said that Cyrus decided to focus on songcraft before tackling the production. She worked with several producers including Kid Harpoon, Tyler Johnson, Greg Kurstin, and Mike Will Made It, the latter of whom contributed to Bangerz (2013), Miley Cyrus & Her Dead Petz (2015), and She Is Coming (2019). The album was recorded in Los Angeles.

== Composition ==
Endless Summer Vacation is a pop and dance-pop record, incorporating rock, country and experimental songs. Cyrus explained that the album is divided into two parts: AM and PM. AM represents "the morning time, where there's a buzz and energy and there's a potential of new possibilities", while PM represents the nighttime, which "feels like there's a slinky, seediness and kind of a grime but a glamour at the same time".

== Release and artwork ==
On December 16, 2022, posters with the caption "New Year, New Miley" were placed in major cities worldwide. Cyrus revealed the album title, cover, and release date on January 5, 2023. The cover was photographed by Brianna Capozzi and "fully executed by [Cyrus] without visual effects", and depicts a blonde Cyrus wearing a black one-piece swimsuit hanging from a helicopter ladder. It was compared to a similar photograph of Madonna for her coffee table book, Sex (1992). The album trailer was released the same day, and "reflects the visual world that [Cyrus] has built around this very personal body of work" with a monologue and visuals that reference Los Angeles sights. Limited quantities of postcards featuring the album cover were autographed by Cyrus and offered through her website later that month. On February 27, 2023, Cyrus revealed the album's tracklist.

Endless Summer Vacation was released on both digital and physical formats through Columbia on March 10. Red and clear vinyl copies of the album were made exclusive to Cyrus' website, and white vinyl copies were made exclusive to retailers, including Target in the United States, HMV in the United Kingdom, and JB Hi-Fi in Australia.

== Promotion ==
Cyrus announced Endless Summer Vacation (Backyard Sessions), a special released on Disney+ on March 10, 2023, featuring live performances and discussion about the creative process behind the album. It follows her Backyard Sessions performances series, started in 2012. Cyrus performed eight songs from the album: "Jaded", "Rose Colored Lenses", "Thousand Miles", "Wildcard", "Island", "Wonder Woman", "River" and "Flowers", as well as her 2009 single "The Climb". Rufus Wainwright joined her on a piano during the performance of "Wonder Woman".

On November 21, 2023, she performed a private show at the Chateau Marmont hotel in Los Angeles, where she sang "Flowers", "Used to Be Young", as well as the covers of Journey's "Faithfully" and "Jingle Bells". The performances were uploaded to her YouTube channel. On February 4, 2024, she performed "Flowers" during the 66th Annual Grammy Awards.

=== Singles ===
"Flowers", in which serves as the album's lead single, was released on January 12, 2023, along with its music video, directed by Jacob Bixenman. Its demo version was released digitally on March 3. "Flowers" was met with mostly positive reception from critics, with many complimenting Cyrus' vocal delivery. It experienced widespread commercial success, becoming the best-selling global single of 2023, earning 2.70 billion subscription streams equivalents globally, according to the International Federation of the Phonographic Industry (IFPI). It broke record as the most streamed song in a week on Spotify during both its first and second week. It spent eleven weeks atop the Billboard Global 200 chart and became the second song in the chart's history to gain over 100 million streams worldwide in eight weeks. It topped the charts in over 35 countries, including the United States, United Kingdom, Australia, Canada, Germany and France. In the United States, it spent eight weeks atop the Billboard Hot 100, becoming Cyrus' second number-one single on the chart after 2013's "Wrecking Ball". Due to 57 weeks atop the Billboard Adult Contemporary chart, it became the longest-running number one song on any Billboard airplay chart in history. In the United Kingdom, it spent its ten debut weeks atop the UK Singles Chart, becoming Cyrus' third number-one single. In Australia, it broke the record of the most streams in a song's first week of release. It spent its twelve debut weeks atop the ARIA Singles Chart, becoming Cyrus' first number-one single.

"River" was released as the album's second single on March 13, after a music video was released on March 10. "Jaded" was sent to American adult contemporary radio as the third single on April 17, and was sent to contemporary hit radio the following day. "Used to Be Young" was released as the fourth single from the digital edition of the album alongside the music video on August 25. The music video for the song was released on the same day and was directed by Jacob Bixenman and Brendan Walter.

== Critical reception ==
Professional ratings
Aggregate scores
| Source | Rating |
|---|---|
| AnyDecentMusic? | 7.4/10 |
| Metacritic | 79/100 |
Review scores
| Source | Rating |
| AllMusic | 4/5 stars |
| Clash | 8/10 |
| The Daily Telegraph | 4/5 stars |
| Evening Standard | 4/5 stars |
| The Guardian | 4/5 stars |
| The Independent | 4/5 stars |
| The Line of Best Fit | 6/10 |
| NME | 4/5 stars |
| Pitchfork | 6.2/10 |
| Slant Magazine | 3/5 stars |

Upon its release, the album was met with favorable reviews from music critics, becoming Cyrus' most acclaimed album to date. At Metacritic, which assigns a weighted mean rating out of 100 to reviews from mainstream critics, the album received an average score of 79, indicating "generally favorable reviews". Rolling Stone's Brittany Spanos called it Cyrus' "sharpest, most independent album yet" and "a powerful artistic statement, focused and clear-eyed as Cyrus seems to have found herself in her thirties". Maura Johnston of the same outlet wrote that the album "feels like a recap of her career's 15-plus years, with Cyrus breezing through genres with the ease of a well-seasoned tourist." Helen Brown of The Independent called it a "lovely long bask in Cyrus's maturing talent." According to Nick Levine of NME, the album "may appear subdued by [Cyrus'] standards, but it remains remarkably intriguing" and "feels like an accurate reflection of who she is as an artist – and a person – in 2023." Emily Swingle of Clash believed that "while previous releases have been Cyrus attempting to don the outfit of another artist she admires, this release feels like she is fully embodying her own skin – this is a release that aims for timelessness in its own right, allowing the true, unfiltered Miley Cyrus to step into the sunlight."

The Daily Telegraph's Neil McCormick wrote "there is much to be admired in Cyrus's defiant will to keep messing about on pop's more eccentric fringes." Mary Siroky of Consequence called the album "cohesive without feeling repetitive", adding that "that sort of plain-spoken storytelling might have made for a good record; Cyrus' vocals take things further into the territory of greatness." Chris Willman of Variety described it as "a fairly unpretentious pop record that has some stylistic micro-shifts that don't announce themselves too proudly or loudly," noting that it balances "mellow gold and dance-pop." David Smyth of Evening Standard felt that "the strength of Cyrus is suiting her mighty voice to so many styles, on an album where even those with the shortest attention spans should find a new favourite". Alexis Petridis of The Guardian opined Cyrus "has delivered a hazily atmospheric album that plays to her provocative strengths." Heather Phares of AllMusic praised Cyrus's growth both as a vocalist and a songwriter, and wrote, "this is a mature album in the best sense of the word; like a good relationship, it's smooth, but not dull, grounded in resilience and self-love." Vulture's Craig Jenkins opined the album "showcases a more unified and refined version of Miley," feeling that "the sound is pliable and chewy, and the lyrics are unpretentious."

In a more mixed review, Sal Cinquemani of Slant Magazine complemented Cyrus' vocal performance, but criticized "nondescript lyricism." For David Cobbals of The Line of Best Fit, Endless Summer Vacation "is a good album with each track deserving of a listen, but in the same breath, the majority of them aren't worthy of a replay either." Pitchfork's Shaad D'Souza called it "edgeless and synthetic." Mark Richardson of The Wall Street Journal felt that it "boasts several songs that rank among her best", but criticized its second half, which "reveals the limitations of Ms. Cyrus's small-plate method of construction." Los Angeles Times' Mikael Wood was critical of the album's lyrics, however opining that "[Cyrus'] singing is vivid enough on Endless Summer Vacation to make up for some mushy songwriting." Kyle Denis of Uproxx called it a "perfectly fine record" and "undeniable proof that Miley Cyrus is still capable of playing and thriving in the mainstream pop game," however feeling that it "ultimately suffers from how safe it is."

=== Year-end lists ===
Select year-end rankings
| Publication/critic | Accolade | Rank | Ref. |
|---|---|---|---|
| Billboard | The 50 Best Albums of 2023: Staff List | 16 | |
| Cosmopolitan | The 30 Best Albums of 2023 | —N/a | |
| Esquire | The 20 Best Albums of 2023 | 12 | |
| People | The 10 Best Albums of 2023 | 3 | |
| PopMatters | The 20 Best Pop Albums of 2023 | 19 | |
| Rolling Stone | The 100 Best Albums of 2023 | 30 | |

== Commercial performance ==
Upon its release, Endless Summer Vacation was a commercial success. The album officially debuted at No. 1 in ten countries, and was in the top 5 of seventeen official charts. In the United States, Endless Summer Vacation performed moderately debuting at number three on the US Billboard 200, earning 119,000 album-equivalent units, including 55,000 pure album sales. It is Cyrus's 14th US top-10 album, and her biggest week by units since Billboard began calculating them in December 2014. In Canada, it debuted at number two on the Canadian Albums Chart.

In the United Kingdom, on the UK Albums Chart, the album went No. 1, becoming Cyrus' second number one album after 2013's Bangerz. On March 29, 2024, the album was certified Gold by the British Phonographic Industry for shipment of 100,000 units. In Germany, it debuted at number two on the GfK Entertainment chart, becoming Cyrus' highest-charting album. In the Netherlands, the album debuted at number one, becoming her first number one album there. In Australia, Endless Summer Vacation debuted atop the ARIA Album Charts, becoming Cyrus' first number one album since Bangerz. In New Zealand, it debuted at number one on the Official New Zealand Music Chart, becoming her second number one album after 2009's Hannah Montana: The Movie soundtrack.

Endless Summer Vacation was the 19th best-selling global album of 2023 across streaming, download and physical sale, according to the International Federation of the Phonographic Industry (IFPI).

== Accolades ==
Awards and nominations
| Organization | Year | Category | Result | Ref. |
|---|---|---|---|---|
| MTV Video Music Awards | 2023 | Album of the Year | Nominated | |
| Los 40 Music Awards | 2023 | Best International Album | Nominated | |
| Danish Music Awards | 2023 | International Album of the Year | Nominated | |
| Grammy Awards | 2024 | Album of the Year | Nominated | |
| Grammy Awards | 2024 | Best Pop Vocal Album | Nominated | |
| People's Choice Awards | 2024 | The Album of the Year | Nominated | |
| Gaffa Awards (Denmark) | 2024 | International Album of the Year | Won | |
| GLAAD Media Awards | 2024 | Outstanding Music Artist | Nominated | |
| Nickelodeon Kids' Choice Awards | 2024 | Favorite Album | Nominated | |

== Track listing ==
Endless Summer Vacation track listing
| No. | Title | Writer(s) | Producer(s) | Length |
|---|---|---|---|---|
| 1. | "Flowers" | Miley Cyrus; Gregory Aldae Hein; Michael Pollack | Kid Harpoon; Tyler Johnson | 3:20 |
| 2. | "Jaded" | Cyrus; Greg Kurstin; Sarah Aarons | Kurstin | 3:05 |
| 3. | "Rose Colored Lenses" | Cyrus; Thomas Hull; Johnson | Kid Harpoon; Johnson | 3:43 |
| 4. | "Thousand Miles" (featuring Brandi Carlile) | Cyrus; Tobias Jesso Jr.; Bibi Bourelly; Michael Williams | Kid Harpoon; Mike Will Made It; Johnson | 3:51 |
| 5. | "You" | Cyrus; Bourelly; Pollack; Ian Kirkpatrick | Jay Moon; Jonny Coffer | 2:59 |
| 6. | "Handstand" | Cyrus; Harmony Korine; Maxx Morando | Morando | 3:25 |
| 7. | "River" | Cyrus; Justin Tranter; Hull; Johnson | Kid Harpoon; Johnson | 2:42 |
| 8. | "Violet Chemistry" | Cyrus; Williams; Jesse Shatkin; James Blake; Sia Furler | Shatkin; Max Taylor-Sheppard; Morando; Mike Will Made It | 4:06 |
| 9. | "Muddy Feet" (featuring Sia) | Cyrus; Pollack; Williams; Bourelly; Hein; Shatkin; Furler; Jesse van der Meulen; David Frank; Steve Kipner; Pam Sheyne | Jerome Williams; Shatkin; Coffer; Mike Will Made It; Zwiffa | 2:16 |
| 10. | "Wildcard" | Cyrus; Hull; Johnson; Jesso | Kid Harpoon; Johnson | 3:13 |
| 11. | "Island" | Cyrus; BJ Burton; Jennifer Decilveo; Caitlyn Smith; Pollack; Dani Miller | Burton | 3:59 |
| 12. | "Wonder Woman" | Cyrus; Pollack; Hein; Hull; Johnson | Kid Harpoon; Johnson | 3:05 |
| Total length: | | | | 39:44 |

Digital bonus tracks
| No. | Title | Writer(s) | Producer(s) | Length |
|---|---|---|---|---|
| 4. | "Used to Be Young" | Cyrus; Hein; Pollack | Cyrus; Pollack; Shawn Everett | 3:11 |
| 14. | "Flowers" (demo) | Cyrus; Hein; Pollack | | 3:30 |
| Total length: | | | | 46:32 |

=== Sample credit ===
- "Muddy Feet" contains elements of "Starving for Love", performed by Ella Washington.
- "Used to Be Young" was added to a second digital variation of Endless Summer Vacation, simultaneously when the song premiered.

== Credits and personnel ==
Credits adapted from Tidal, Pitchfork and the liner notes.

Locations

- Recorded at:

- Sunset Sound Recorders (1)
- No Expectations Studios, Los Angeles (2)
- The Cave, Nashville (3)
- Ridgemont Studios, Los Angeles (3)
- Larrabee Sound Studios, Los Angeles (4, 6, 11, 12, 13)
- Coffer Family BBQ, London (5, 9)
- Dr. Preuss Studios, Los Angeles (6)
- Ridgemont High, Los Angeles (4, 7, 10, 12)
- The Ribcage, Los Angeles (8)

- Mixed at Windmill Lane Studios, Dublin
- Mastered at Sterling Sound, Edgewater

Musicians

- Miley Cyrus – vocals (all tracks), vocal percussion (1, 4)
- Jamie Arentzen – harmonica (4)
- James Blake – synthesizer (8)
- BJ Burton – drum machine, guitar, synthesizer (11)
- Brandi Carlile – vocals (4)
- Matt Chamberlain – tom-toms (11)
- Jonny Coffer – bass guitar, synthesizer (5, 9); keyboards, percussion, programming (5); guitar, piano (9)
- Keyon Harrold – trumpet (8)
- Ivan Jackson – horn (7)
- Tobias Jesso Jr. – keyboards (4)
- Josh Johnson – saxophone (3)
- Tyler Johnson – electric guitar (1), keyboards (1, 4), synthesizer (1, 3, 4, 7, 10), drums (4); bass guitar, drum machine, vocals (7)
- Kid Harpoon – bass guitar, synthesizer (1, 3, 4, 7, 10, 12); drums, guitar (1, 3, 4, 7, 10); percussion (1), acoustic guitar (3), piano (3, 4); drum machine, vocals (7)
- Greg Kurstin – acoustic guitar, bass guitar, drums, electric guitar, keyboards, percussion, synthesizer (2)
- Mike Will Made It – drums (4, 8); piano, synthesizer (9)
- Jay Moon – programming (5), guitar (9)
- Rob Moose – strings, viola, violin (1)
- Maxx Morando – all instruments (6); bass guitar, drums, keyboards, synthesizer (8)
- Michael Pollack – keyboards (1, 13), piano (12)
- Buddy Ross – keyboards (11)
- Jesse Shatkin – bass guitar, drum machine, keyboards, synthesizer (8); vocals (9)
- Doug Showalter – keyboards (1)
- Sia – vocals (9)
- Jake Sinclair – guitar (5)
- Aaron Steele – drums (3)
- Alex Sutton – bass guitar, guitar (11)
- Max Taylor-Sheppard – bass guitar, drum machine, drums, keyboards, synthesizer (8)
- Emi Trevena – piano (4)
- Zwiffa – piano, synthesizer (9)

Production

- Miley Cyrus – executive production
- Julian Burg – engineering (2)
- Samuel Dent – engineering (8)
- Pièce Eatah – engineering (4, 6, 11, 12, 13)
- Craig Frank – engineering (13)
- Paul Hager – engineering (13)
- Stacy Jones – engineering (13)
- Greg Kurstin – engineering (2)
- Joe LaPorta – mastering
- Nick Lobel – engineering (3, 10)
- Maxx Morando – engineering (6)
- Brian Rajaratnam – engineering (1, 3, 4, 7, 10, 12)
- Mark "Spike" Stent – mixing (1–12)
- Emi Trevena – engineering (4)
- Matt Tuggle – engineering (2)
- Matt Wolach – engineering assistance (1–12)

Design

- Miley Cyrus – concept
- Jacob Bixenman – creative direction
- Brianna Capozzi – photography
- Brent David Freaney – art direction
- Savannah Ioakimedes – art direction
- Sophia Marinelli – art direction
- Brendan Walter – additional art direction

== Charts ==
=== Weekly charts ===
Weekly chart performance
| Chart (2023) | Peak position |
|---|---|
| Australian Albums (ARIA) | 1 |
| Austrian Albums (Ö3 Austria) | 1 |
| Belgian Albums (Ultratop Flanders) | 2 |
| Belgian Albums (Ultratop Wallonia) | 3 |
| Canadian Albums (Billboard) | 2 |
| Croatian International Albums (HDU) | 5 |
| Czech Albums (ČNS IFPI) | 3 |
| Danish Albums (Hitlisten) | 4 |
| Dutch Albums (Album Top 100) | 1 |
| Finnish Albums (Suomen virallinen lista) | 2 |
| French Albums (SNEP) | 6 |
| German Albums (Offizielle Top 100) | 2 |
| Greek Albums (IFPI) | 16 |
| Hungarian Albums (MAHASZ) | 3 |
| Irish Albums (Official Charts) | 1 |
| Icelandic Albums (Tónlistinn) | 4 |
| Italian Albums (FIMI) | 4 |
| Japanese Digital Albums (Oricon) | 24 |
| Japanese Hot Albums (Billboard Japan) | 60 |
| Lithuanian Albums (AGATA) | 2 |
| New Zealand Albums (RMNZ) | 1 |
| Norwegian Albums (VG-lista) | 1 |
| Polish Albums (ZPAV) | 2 |
| Portuguese Albums (AFP) | 1 |
| Scottish Albums (Official Charts) | 1 |
| Slovak Albums (ČNS IFPI) | 3 |
| Spanish Albums (Promusicae) | 4 |
| Swedish Albums (Sverigetopplistan) | 2 |
| Swiss Albums (Schweizer Hitparade) | 1 |
| UK Albums (Official Charts) | 1 |
| US Billboard 200 | 3 |

=== Year-end charts ===
2023 year-end chart performance
| Chart (2023) | Position |
|---|---|
| Australian Albums (ARIA) | 75 |
| Austrian Albums (Ö3 Austria) | 67 |
| Belgian Albums (Ultratop Flanders) | 54 |
| Belgian Albums (Ultratop Wallonia) | 64 |
| Canadian Albums (Billboard) | 23 |
| Danish Albums (Hitlisten) | 38 |
| Dutch Albums (Album Top 100) | 38 |
| French Albums (SNEP) | 47 |
| German Albums (Offizielle Top 100) | 61 |
| Global Albums (IFPI) | 19 |
| Hungarian Albums (MAHASZ) | 60 |
| Icelandic Albums (Tónlistinn) | 69 |
| Italian Albums (FIMI) | 81 |
| Polish Albums (ZPAV) | 41 |
| Portuguese Albums (AFP) | 37 |
| Spanish Albums (PROMUSICAE) | 45 |
| Swedish Albums (Sverigetopplistan) | 33 |
| Swiss Albums (Schweizer Hitparade) | 52 |
| UK Albums (OCC) | 78 |
| US Billboard 200 | 45 |

2024 year-end chart performance
| Chart (2024) | Position |
|---|---|
| French Albums (SNEP) | 177 |
| US Billboard 200 | 175 |

== Certifications ==
Certifications
| Region | Certification | Certified units/sales |
|---|---|---|
| Austria (IFPI Austria) | Platinum | 15,000^{‡} |
| Belgium (BRMA) | Platinum | 20,000^{‡} |
| Brazil (Pro-Música Brasil) | 3× Platinum | 120,000^{‡} |
| Canada (Music Canada) | 2× Platinum | 160,000^{‡} |
| Denmark (IFPI Danmark) | Platinum | 20,000^{‡} |
| France (SNEP) | Platinum | 100,000^{‡} |
| Italy (FIMI) | Gold | 25,000^{‡} |
| Mexico (AMPROFON) | Gold | 70,000^{‡} |
| New Zealand (RMNZ) | Platinum | 15,000^{‡} |
| Poland (ZPAV) | 3× Platinum | 60,000^{‡} |
| Spain (Promusicae) | Gold | 20,000^{‡} |
| Sweden (GLF) | Gold | 15,000^{‡} |
| Switzerland (IFPI Switzerland) | Gold | 10,000^{‡} |
| United Kingdom (BPI) | Gold | 100,000^{‡} |
| United States (RIAA) | Platinum | 1,000,000^{‡} |
^{‡} Sales+streaming figures based on certification alone.

== Release history ==
Release history
| Region | Date | Format(s) | Edition(s) | Label | Ref. |
|---|---|---|---|---|---|
| Various | March 10, 2023 | CD; digital download; streaming; vinyl | Standard | Columbia | |
| Japan | March 29, 2023 | CD | Standard | Sony | |
| Various | August 25, 2023 | Digital download; streaming | Reissue | Columbia | |

== See also ==
- List of number-one albums from the 2020s (New Zealand)
- List of number-one albums of 2023 (Australia)
- List of number-one albums of 2023 (Ireland)
- List of number-one albums of 2023 (Portugal)
- List of UK Albums Chart number ones of the 2020s
