= Send It On (Disney song) =

2009 single by Demi Lovato, Jonas Brothers, Miley Cyrus and Selena Gomez

Promotional single by Miley Cyrus, Jonas Brothers, Demi Lovato and Selena Gomez
- Released: August 11, 2009
- Genre: Pop
- Length: 3:26
- Label: Walt Disney; Hollywood
- Songwriters: Adam Anders; Nikki Hassman; Peer Åström
- Producers: Adam Anders; Peer Åström

Music video
- "Send It On" on YouTube

"Send It On" is a song recorded by American recording artists Miley Cyrus, Jonas Brothers, Demi Lovato and Selena Gomez from charity project Disney's Friends for Change. The track's producers Adam Anders and Peer Åström co-wrote it with Nikki Hassman. The song was released on August 11, 2009, by Walt Disney and Hollywood Records as a promotional charity single in order to benefit international environmental associations. In regard to the song and the campaign, the six singers noted that it is a good cause and that it is one dear to them. Lyrically, the pop ballad is about passing on an environmentalist message.

The song received mixed reviews from critics, who noted the lyrics make no mention of the environment. It peaked at number twenty on the Billboard Hot 100. The corresponding music video has all four acts singing into microphones on top of a brightly lit stage and running across a park setting where many children are following them.

== Background ==
Initially known as "Pass It On", the song was written by Adam Anders and Nikki Hassman in collaboration with Peer Åström. The four artists went through several recording sessions in early April 2009. Each person shared their opinion in regards to the song and Disney's Friends for Change in an interview with Access Hollywood. Joe Jonas said that the song is one with a "great message." He added that the song is about helping the Earth in whichever way possible and that it is mainly about letting "everyone know." Joe Jonas said the song even reminds oneself to be more eco-friendly. Gomez stated,

If I could describe the feeling of performing 'Send It On,' it would have to be very empowering. It's more of a power you can't control. It's very sweet and it's got a message behind it. And I think that's what makes it really beautiful, because it's not just about us wearing cute clothes and performing on the stage, it's about us giving this message.

Cyrus mentioned that her favorite part to record was the line "One spark starts a fire." Cyrus said she "loved" the line because it was true for her and that if children send on the message, everyone will know. She also believed that they were "encouraging kids to do it", which she found inspirational. Lovato stated: "It's very important to us to be good to the environment" and that the song is a part of a "big movement" that they are attempting to achieve. Kevin Jonas said it was a "big honor" and that "the vibe [...] is great" because they have "all known each other for years now." Nick Jonas said that the song is just about "taking those tiny steps" that could make the Earth better.

== Music, vocal arrangements and lyrics ==
"Send It On" (2009)
A sample of Disney's Friends for Change's "Send It On." The song is a pop ballad that talks about passing on a message.

The song is set in common time with a ballad tempo of 90 beats per minute. It is written in a key of A major. The artists' vocals span three octaves, from the low note of F♯_{3} to the high note of E_{5}. The song has the following chord progression, A–F#m–C#m–E5.

The song is sung from a first person viewpoint, allowing an audience to "internalize" the message—which involves everybody—by singing the word "we" together. "Send It On" commences with acoustic guitars and then transitioning to violins. Together, Miley Cyrus and Nick Jonas sing the first verse, "A word's just a word till you mean what you say." Then, the two sing the first chorus together. Demi Lovato and Joe Jonas then sing main lines of the second verse with the other group (Miley Cyrus and Nick Jonas) singing, "If we take the chances to change circumstances." Miley Cyrus, Nick Jonas, Demi Lovato, and Joe Jonas sing the interlude, with Selena Gomez and Kevin Jonas sing the bridge. Everyone sings the second chorus and the remaining parts of the song. The overall theme and message of the song is to encourage to pass on the environmental pledge; this can be heavily interpreted from the lines: "Just one spark starts a fire."

== Release ==
Snippets of the song was first heard as the opening theme for commercials that aired on Disney Channel in regards to Disney's Friends for Change. "Send It On" later debuted on Radio Disney on August 7, 2009. Later on August 11, the song was released digitally, via iTunes Store. Disney directed 100% of the proceeds from "Send it On" to environmental charities through the Disney Worldwide Conservation Fund (DWCF). The music video premiered on Disney Channel on August 14 and the day later to Disney.com and ABC. On August 15, a digital extended play was released to the iTunes Store, featuring the song, its music video, two commercials in regards to the project that aired on Disney Channel and a digital booklet.

== Reception ==
=== Critical reception ===
“Send It On” received mixed reviews from critics. Bill Lamb of About.com stated: "The song may sound a bit tedious. It's not likely to be much more enduring than the typical American Idol winner's finale song. However, the purchase of this song is for a very good cause." Gina Sepre and Whitney English of E! said that the song was Disney's take on "We are the World" by a super-group billed as USA for Africa, a group which included successful acts such as Michael Jackson and Diana Ross.

Leo Hickman of The Guardian criticized the artists as hypocritical and the song's lyrics as ineffective, noting that "there are no references at all to the environment to be found within the song," as opposed to Cyrus's song "Wake Up America" from her second album which he mentioned was more influential. In 2023, it was chosen by Billboard as one of the 100 Greatest Disney Songs of All Time.

=== Chart performance ===
The song debuted at number nine on Hot Digital Songs which led to it making into the Billboard Hot 100, issue dated August 29, 2009. "Send It On" debuted and peaked at number twenty in the Hot 100. It then fell to number twenty-one, and stayed on for three more weeks before falling off.

== Music video ==
Left to right: Joe Jonas, Demi Lovato, Nick Jonas, Miley Cyrus, Selena Gomez, and Kevin Jonas singing into their microphones on top of a stage in the "Send It On" music video.

On June 6, 2009, Lovato confirmed to be on set of the corresponding music video to the song, via Lovato's official Twitter account. The music video to "Send It On" was first seen on Disney Channel on August 14, 2009, and on ABC Family on April 22, 2010.

The music video, directed by Michael Blum and Tracy Pion, begins with Miley Cyrus and Nick Jonas sitting on the edge of a dark stage where Nick, also playing the acoustic guitar, and Miley singing the first verse. The video then changes to the two walking onto the brightly lighted stage, singing the chorus, and then being joined by Demi Lovato and Joe Jonas who sing the second verse. The entire group is then shown on the stage as they sing the chorus. Kevin and Joe Jonas then remove a curtain covering the background of stage to reveal a sky-painted backdrop in which Selena Gomez and Kevin Jonas proceed to sing the bridge. The ending of the video follows the entire group running out of a large stage door and through a "park-like" setting while finishing the song. A crowd of kids also begin running behind the group. The video ends with the group jumping onto and sitting on a couch in the middle of the park with the crowd stopping in the background to watch the sunset.

== Charts ==
Chart (2009)	Peak position
US Billboard Hot 100	20
