= MuchMusic Video Award for Best International Artist Video =

The following is a list of the MuchMusic Video Awards winners for Best International Artist Video. Lady Gaga and Rihanna hold the record for most wins, with 2 each.

| Year | Artist | Video | Ref. |
|---|---|---|---|
| 1998 | Madonna | "Ray of Light" | |
| 2001 | Eminem featuring Dido | "Stan" | |
| 2002 | Shakira | "Whenever, Wherever" | |
| 2003 | Sean Paul | "Like Glue" | |
| 2004 | Beyoncé featuring Jay-Z | "Crazy in Love" | |
| 2005 | Usher | "Caught Up" | |
| 2006 | Rihanna | "SOS" | |
| 2007 | Fergie | "Fergalicious" | |
| 2008 | Rihanna | "Don't Stop the Music" | |
| 2009 | Lady Gaga | "Poker Face" | |
| 2010 | Miley Cyrus | "Party in the U.S.A." | |
| 2011 | Lady Gaga | "Judas" | |
| 2012 | Katy Perry | "Last Friday Night (T.G.I.F.)" | |
| 2013 | Demi Lovato | "Heart Attack" | |
| 2014 | Lorde | "Royals" | |
| 2015 | Ed Sheeran | "Thinking Out Loud" | |
