= A Thousand Miles to Freedom =

2012 memoir by Eunsun Kim

A Thousand Miles to Freedom: My Escape from North Korea
- First edition (French)
- Author: Eunsun Kim; Sébastien Falletti
- Audio read by: Emily Woo Zeller
- Original title: Corée du Nord: 9 ans pour fuir l'enfer
- Translator: David Tian
- Language: English
- Subject: North Korea
- Publisher: Michel Lafon Publishing; St. Martin's Press
- Publication date: 2012
- English publication date: 21 July 2015
- Pages: 240
- ISBN: 978-1250064646

A Thousand Miles to Freedom: My Escape from North Korea (French: Corée du Nord: 9 ans pour fuir l'enfer, Korean: 열한 살의 유서) is a 2012 memoir by Eunsun Kim, with Sébastien Falletti. It was translated into English by David Tian in 2015.

The English-language version was first released on 21 July 2015 and was available on Amazon, at Barnes & Noble, and at other bookstores. Immediately upon release, it was ranked #1 in several categories on Amazon, including New Releases, South Korean History, and others.

The book was originally written in French, and subsequently translated to Norwegian and Korean. David Tian translated the book from French to English, not from Korean to English, as many media outlets have assumed.

Eunsun Kim, whose story the memoir recounts, says that there were parts of her life that remain a little difficult to talk about, and hence she left them out of her memoir.
