= Endless Summer Vacation (Backyard Sessions) =

2023 documentary concert special

- Official poster
- Based on: Endless Summer Vacation by Miley Cyrus
- Directed by: Jacob Bixenman; Brendan Walter
- Starring: Miley Cyrus
- Country of origin: United States
- Original language: English

Production
- Producer: Miley Cyrus
- Cinematography: Marcell Rév
- Running time: 42 minutes
- Production companies: RadicalMedia; HopeTown Entertainment; Crush Management; Columbia Records; MCEO

Original release
- Network: Disney+ Sony Music Entertainment
- Release: March 10, 2023

Endless Summer Vacation (Backyard Sessions) is an American documentary concert special directed by Jacob Bixenman and Brendan Walter, and starring American singer Miley Cyrus, released on Disney+ on March 10, 2023. It is a companion piece to her eighth studio album Endless Summer Vacation (2023), where Cyrus performs eight songs from the album alongside her single, "The Climb" (2009), while discussing the creative process behind the album.

== Synopsis ==
The official synopsis released to Disney+ states "Miley Cyrus takes the stage in this must-see, Disney+ music event, Miley Cyrus – Endless Summer Vacation (Backyard Sessions). For the first time ever, Miley performs songs from her highly anticipated eighth studio album, Endless Summer Vacation, including her hit single "Flowers", seven additional tracks from the album, plus a special performance. The global superstar's cinematic, one-of-a-kind performances are threaded together with exclusive interviews in the famed Los Angeles house where Frank Sinatra once lived, and where Miley shot the celebrated official music video for "Flowers". With this special, Miley opens the door to audiences around the world providing insight into her new album and the person she is today."

== Release and promotion ==
On March 3, 2023, Cyrus announced the television special programme to promote her eighth studio album, Endless Summer Vacation. The special is executive produced by Cyrus under her production company, Hopetown Entertainment, with Crush Management, and Columbia Records as co-producers.

== Set list ==
1. "Jaded"
2. "Rose Colored Lenses"
3. "Thousand Miles"
4. "Wildcard"
5. "Island"
6. "Wonder Woman" (with Rufus Wainwright on piano)
7. "The Climb"
8. "River"
9. "Flowers"

== Endless Summer Vacation: Continued (Backyard Sessions) ==
Official poster for Endless Summer Vacation: Continued (Backyard Sessions)

An updated version of the special titled Endless Summer Vacation: Continued (Backyard Sessions) aired on ABC on August 24, 2023, before the release of her single "Used to Be Young" the day after. It was also released on Hulu on August 25 to stream. The original interview is replaced by a new interview in which Cyrus reflects on career highlights. Cyrus dedicated the performance of "Wonder Woman" to Sinéad O'Connor.
