= Doctor (Work It Out) =

2024 single by Pharrell Williams and Miley Cyrus

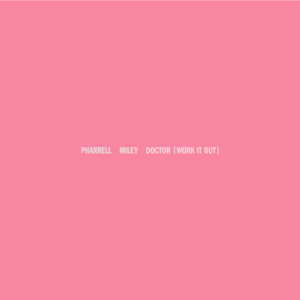

Single by Pharrell Williams and Miley Cyrus
- Written: 2012
- Released: March 1, 2024
- Genre: Glam pop; pop rock
- Length: 3:02
- Label: Columbia
- Songwriters: Pharrell Williams; Miley Cyrus; Michael Pollack
- Producer: Pharrell Williams

Pharrell Williams singles chronology
"Good People" (2024)	"Doctor (Work It Out)" (2024)	"Double Life" (2024)

Miley Cyrus singles chronology
"Wrecking Ball" (2023)	"Doctor (Work It Out)" (2024)	"II Most Wanted" (2024)

Music video
- "Doctor (Work It Out)" on YouTube

"Doctor (Work It Out)" is a song produced by Pharrell Williams and performed by American singer Miley Cyrus. It is their first collaboration in ten years, after Cyrus featured on Williams's 2014 single "Come Get It Bae"; Williams previously produced four songs for Cyrus's fourth studio album, Bangerz (2013). "Doctor (Work It Out)" is a restructured and re-recorded version of a song recorded during the Bangerz recording sessions. They worked with songwriter Michael Pollack and released it on March 1, 2024.

== Background and release ==
We just believe so much in timing and in everything happening when it's supposed to. And around the Grammys, Pharrell and I were talking about putting the song out, and it just felt like it was so serendipitous, and there were so many alignments and so many moments that made me know that now was the perfect time. And then sometimes things in our past make more sense in our present than they ever did then. [So] this song, I think the nature, the celebration, the feeling, especially with the video, the joy, the dancing, the letting go, it's what this song really always needed.

— Cyrus, Pitchfork

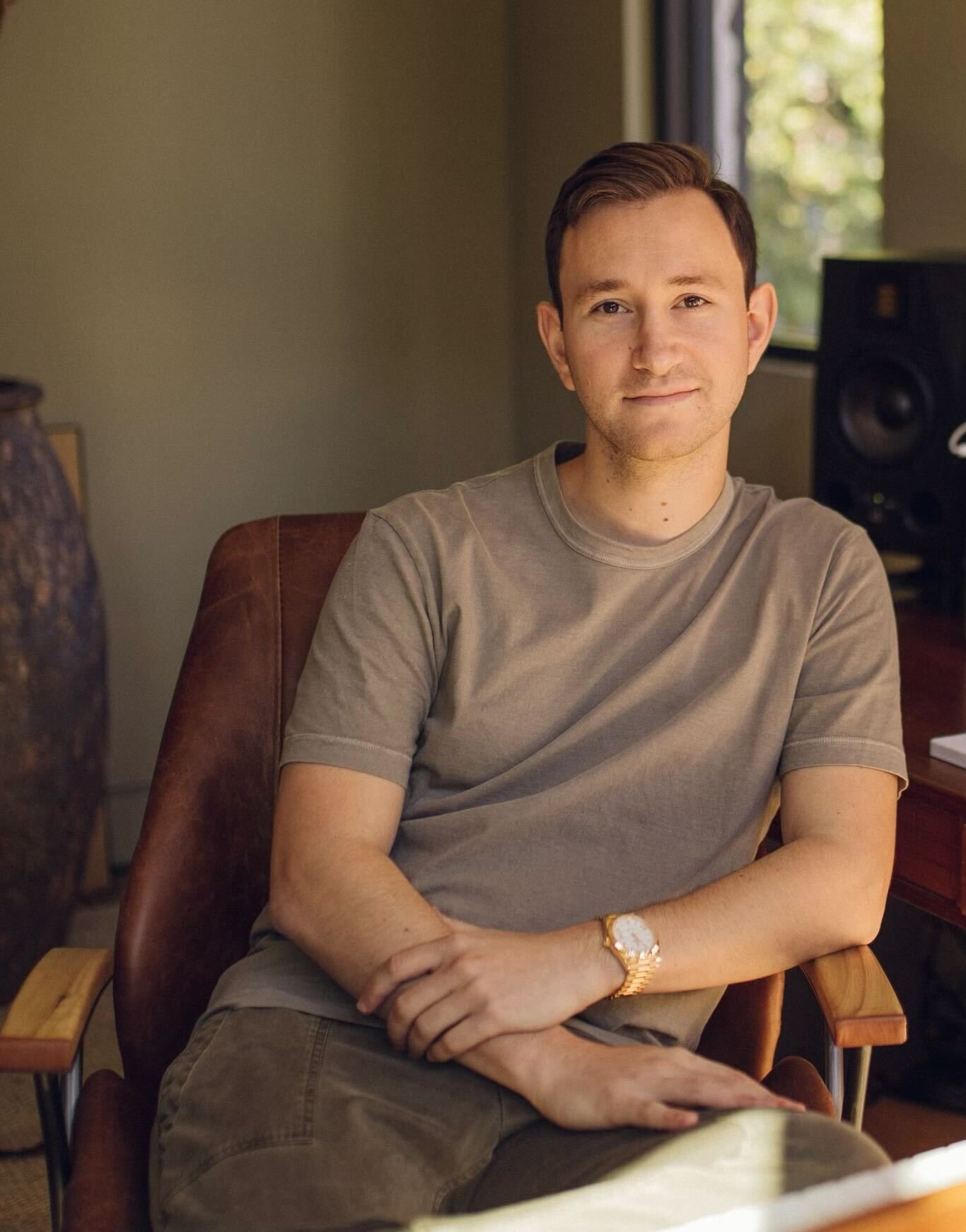
Michael Pollack co-wrote the song.

The song was initially written and recorded by Cyrus—with co-writing and production by Williams—for her fourth studio album, Bangerz (2013), but did not make the final tracklist. Cyrus and Williams collaborated on four tracks that were released as part of the album, and the single "Come Get It Bae" from the latter's second studio album, Girl (2014). A demo titled "Doctor" was leaked online in December 2017.

Over a decade later, the track was reworked and re-recorded by 2023, and was previewed during the livestream of Williams's Louis Vuitton menswear fall-winter show during Paris Fashion Week, on January 16, 2024. In February, Cyrus's website and social media layouts were updated with new pictures from a Polaroid-themed photoshoot, which prompted speculation on new music. Later that month, Williams previewed the song via his social media and alluded to an official release, with his post captioned as "soon".

On February 27, Cyrus announced the single's title as "Doctor (Work It Out)", shared a promotional image, and released a 30-second snippet via her social media. The picture featured Cyrus standing against a gray background and looking into the camera, styled with big hair and wearing a blue fur coat. The title appears in pink at the top of the image. Pre-save links to the song were made available simultaneously. The day after, Cyrus released a preview of the song's music video of her dancing and singing along to the lyrics, and announced the release date as March 1, 2024.

"Doctor (Work It Out)" is Cyrus's first collaboration with Williams in over a decade, after "Come Get It Bae", and their fifth, overall.

== Critical reception ==
In a four out of five stars review, Roisin O'Connor of The Independent described the song as a "glam-pop-rock jam" with "funky bass hook". The writer assimilated its "melody and rhythm" to "I Wanna Be Your Slave" by Måneskin and called the intro as "redolent of the one on "Blurred Lines", finding that "Cyrus elevates what could've been a forgettable bop, adding the thrills and spills with a gasp, a moan."

== Music video ==
The music video for "Doctor (Work It Out)" is directed by Jacob Bixenman. It premiered simultaneously with the release of the song, via Cyrus's Vevo channel on YouTube.

== Accolades ==
Awards and nominations for "Doctor (Work It Out)"
Organization	Year	Category	Result	Ref.
Nickelodeon Kids' Choice Awards	2024	Favorite Music Collaboration	Nominated	

== Charts ==
=== Weekly charts ===
Weekly chart performance
Chart (2024)	Peak position
Argentina Hot 100 (Billboard)	70
Australian New Music Singles (ARIA)	20
Belarus Airplay (TopHit)	125
Belgium (Ultratop 50 Wallonia)	47
Canada Hot 100 (Billboard)	41
Canada CHR/Top 40 (Billboard)	31
Canada Hot AC (Billboard)	36
CIS Airplay (TopHit)	94
Croatian International Airplay (Top lista)	5
Czech Republic Singles Digital (ČNS IFPI)	90
Estonian Airplay (TopHit)	31
Finland Airplay (Radiosoittolista)	88
French Airplay (SNEP)	58
Global 200 (Billboard)	60
Ireland (IRMA)	44
Israeli International Airplay (Media Forest)	3
Japan Hot Overseas (Billboard Japan)	4
Latvian Airplay (LaIPA)	16
Lithuanian Airplay (TopHit)	10
New Zealand Hot Singles (RMNZ)	5
Nigeria (TurnTable Top 100)	79
Panama Airplay (Monitor Latino)	10
Poland (Polish Airplay Top 100)	95
Poland (Polish Streaming Top 100)	93
Portugal (AFP)	116
Romanian Airplay (TopHit)	104
Serbian Airplay (Radiomonitor)	6
Slovakia Airplay (ČNS IFPI)	43
Sweden (Sverigetopplistan)	90
Switzerland (Schweizer Hitparade)	61
UK Singles (Official Charts)	46
US Billboard Hot 100	74
Venezuelan Airplay (Record Report)	38

=== Year-end charts ===
Year-end chart performance
Chart (2025)	Position
Argentina Anglo Airplay (Monitor Latino)	64

== Certifications ==
Certifications for "Doctor (Work It Out)"
Region	Certification	Certified units/sales
Brazil (Pro-Música Brasil)	Gold	20,000^{‡}
^{‡} Sales+streaming figures based on certification alone.

== Release history ==
Release dates and formats for "Doctor (Work It Out)"
Region	Date	Format	Label	Ref.
Various	March 1, 2024	Digital download; streaming	Columbia	
Italy	March 8, 2024	Radio airplay	Sony	
