= Used to Be Young =

2023 single by Miley Cyrus

Single by Miley Cyrus

from the album Endless Summer Vacation
- Written: 2021
- Released: August 25, 2023
- Studio: Subtle McNugget Studios (Los Angeles, CA)
- Genre: Pop; soft rock
- Length: 3:11
- Label: Columbia
- Songwriters: Miley Cyrus; Gregory Aldae Hein; Michael Pollack
- Producers: Miley Cyrus; Michael Pollack; Shawn Everett

Miley Cyrus singles chronology
"Jaded" (2023)	"Used to Be Young" (2023)	"Wrecking Ball" (2023)

Music video
- "Used to Be Young" on YouTube

"Used to Be Young" is a song by American singer Miley Cyrus. It was released as a single on August 25, 2023, through Columbia Records, after the broadcast of the ABC documentary concert special Endless Summer Vacation: Continued (Backyard Sessions) the day before, and appears on the digital reissue of Cyrus's eighth studio album Endless Summer Vacation (2023). The song was written by Cyrus alongside Aldae and Michael Pollack, with the singer, Pollack, and Shawn Everett handling production.

"Used to Be Young" debuted at number eight on the Billboard Hot 100, becoming Cyrus' 12th top ten song and her second one from Endless Summer Vacation, following "Flowers".

== Background ==
These lyrics were written almost 2 years ago at the beginning of my [Endless Summer Vacation]. It was at a time I felt misunderstood. I have [painted] a sonic picture of my perspective to share with you. The time has arrived to release a song that I could perfect forever. Although my work is done, this song will continue to write itself every day. The fact it remains unfinished is a part of its beauty. That is my life at this moment ... unfinished yet complete.

— Cyrus on writing the song, Billboard

Cyrus first teased the song and an upcoming release in her June 2023 cover story for British Vogue; she revealed its lyrics: "I know I used to be crazy / I know I used to be fun / You say I used to be wild / I say I used to be young". On August 15, 2023, Cyrus posted a clip to her social media of a street covered in posters of her, captioned with song lyrics of her past eras along with the lyric "I say I used to be young". These posters were spotted in various cities worldwide that day, including Brussels, Los Angeles, New York City, and Paris. The words "Used to Be Young" also appeared on all of her music video thumbnails on YouTube.

Cyrus announced the single along with the ABC documentary concert special, Endless Summer Vacation: Continued (Backyard Sessions) through a trailer on her social media on August 17. She revealed the song's cover art and release date—August 25, 2023, a day after the broadcast of the special, an updated and "reimagined" version of Endless Summer Vacation (Backyard Sessions) (2023). A limited edition 7-inch vinyl of the song was made available to pre-order, along with its pre-save on streaming platforms. In an accompanying statement, Cyrus said that "Used to Be Young" is dedicated to her "loyal fans" for "loving every version of [her]". She revealed that she chose to release the song on August 25, 2023, as it marked a decade since her controversial 2013 MTV VMAs performance, as well as the release of her single "Wrecking Ball" (2013) and its respective music video. The singer posted the entirety of the song's lyrics on August 22 to her social media. Cyrus revealed it was written in 2021 during the initial stages of development of her eighth studio album, Endless Summer Vacation (2023); she "[painted] a sonic picture of [her] perspective to share with [her fans]". The song is written in the key of E major.

== Commercial performance ==
"Used to Be Young" became Miley Cyrus's 12th top-ten song on the Billboard Hot 100, debuting at number eight with 25.9 million in airplay audience, 17.8 million streams and 19,000 downloads. It debuted at number 2 on the Digital Song Sales, number 9 on Streaming Songs and number 19 on Radio Songs. It also marked Cyrus's second song to appear in the top ten of the Hot 100 in 2023, following "Flowers".

== Credits and personnel ==
Credits adapted from YouTube.

- Miley Cyrus – vocals, songwriter, producer
- Michael Pollack – songwriter, producer, associated performer, celeste, keyboards, organ, piano, synthesizer
- Shawn Everett – producer, keyboards, synthesizer, engineer, mixing engineer, vocal engineer
- Gregory Aldae Hein – songwriter
- Pino Palladino – bass
- Delicate Steve – guitar
- Maxx Morando – drums, programmer, synthesizer
- Ian Gold – engineer
- Pièce Eatah – engineer, vocal engineer
- Chris Gehringer – mastering engineer

== Charts ==
=== Weekly charts ===
Weekly chart performance
Chart (2023–2024)	Peak position
Australia (ARIA)	13
Austria (Ö3 Austria Top 40)	29
Belgium (Ultratop 50 Flanders)	6
Belgium (Ultratop 50 Wallonia)	13
Canada Hot 100 (Billboard)	8
Canada AC (Billboard)	4
Canada CHR/Top 40 (Billboard)	2
Canada Hot AC (Billboard)	1
CIS Airplay (TopHit)	56
Croatia International Airplay (HRT)	8
Czech Republic Airplay (ČNS IFPI)	52
Czech Republic Singles Digital (ČNS IFPI)	31
Denmark (Tracklisten)	25
France (SNEP)	101
Germany (GfK)	53
Global 200 (Billboard)	6
Greece International (IFPI)	69
Iceland (Tónlistinn)	19
Ireland (IRMA)	7
Israel (Media Forest)	12
Italy (FIMI)	72
Latvia (EHR)	33
Lebanon (Lebanese Top 20)	2
Lithuania (AGATA)	33
Netherlands (Dutch Top 40)	22
Netherlands (Single Top 100)	60
New Zealand (Recorded Music NZ)	12
Norway (VG-lista)	12
Panama (Monitor Latino)	16
Panama (PRODUCE)	45
Poland (Polish Airplay Top 100)	7
Poland (Polish Streaming Top 100)	77
Portugal (AFP)	45
Russia Airplay (TopHit)	105
Singapore (RIAS)	29
Slovakia Airplay (ČNS IFPI)	8
Slovakia Singles Digital (ČNS IFPI)	32
Spain (Promusicae)	81
Sweden (Sverigetopplistan)	23
Switzerland (Schweizer Hitparade)	23
UK Singles (Official Charts)	12
US Billboard Hot 100	8
US Adult Contemporary (Billboard)	7
US Adult Pop Airplay (Billboard)	1
US Dance Airplay (Billboard)	18
US Pop Airplay (Billboard)	4
Vietnam (Vietnam Hot 100)	61

=== Monthly charts ===
Monthly chart performance
Chart (2023)	Peak position
CIS (TopHit)	63

=== Year-end charts ===
Year-end chart performance
Chart (2023)	Position
Belgium (Ultratop 50 Flanders)	77
Estonia Airplay (TopHit)	21
Iceland (Tónlistinn)	93
Israel (Galgalatz)	17
Netherlands (Dutch Top 40)	94
Poland (Polish Airplay Top 100)	81
US Adult Contemporary (Billboard)	32
US Adult Top 40 (Billboard)	49
US Digital Song Sales (Billboard)	51

Chart (2024)	Position
Canada (Canadian Hot 100)	49
Estonia Airplay (TopHit)	103
Iceland (Tónlistinn)	71
US Adult Contemporary (Billboard)	15
US Adult Top 40 (Billboard)	10
US Mainstream Top 40 (Billboard)	22
US Radio Songs (Billboard)	26

== Certifications ==
Certifications for "Used to Be Young"
Region	Certification	Certified units/sales
Australia (ARIA)	Gold	35,000^{‡}
Belgium (BRMA)	Gold	20,000^{‡}
Brazil (Pro-Música Brasil)	Platinum	40,000^{‡}
Canada (Music Canada)	Gold	40,000^{‡}
Denmark (IFPI Danmark)	Gold	45,000^{‡}
Mexico (AMPROFON)	Gold	70,000^{‡}
New Zealand (RMNZ)	Platinum	30,000^{‡}
Poland (ZPAV)	Gold	25,000^{‡}
United Kingdom (BPI)	Gold	400,000^{‡}
United States (RIAA)	Platinum	1,000,000^{‡}
^{‡} Sales+streaming figures based on certification alone.

== Release history ==
Release dates and formats for "Used to Be Young"
Region	Date	Format(s)	Label	Ref.
Various	August 25, 2023	Digital download; streaming	Columbia	
United States	August 29, 2023	Contemporary hit radio	Columbia	
Various	October 13, 2023	7-inch vinyl	Columbia	
Italy	November 3, 2023	Radio airplay	Sony	
