= Jaded (Miley Cyrus song) =

Single by Miley Cyrus

from the album Endless Summer Vacation
- Released: April 17, 2023
- Recorded: 2022
- Studio: No Expectations Studios (Los Angeles)
- Genre: Pop rock
- Length: 3:05
- Label: Columbia
- Songwriters: Miley Cyrus; Sarah Aarons; Greg Kurstin
- Producer: Greg Kurstin

Miley Cyrus singles chronology
"River" (2023)	"Jaded" (2023)	"Used to Be Young" (2023)

Music video
- "Jaded" on YouTube

"Jaded" is a song by American singer Miley Cyrus. It was released on April 17, 2023, by Columbia Records as the third single from her eighth studio album Endless Summer Vacation (2023). The track was written by Cyrus, Sarah Aarons, and its producer Greg Kurstin.

== Composition ==
"Jaded" is a pop rock song with alt-rock flavors. Lyrically, it reflects on a breakup and the impact it had on an unnamed ex-partner.

== Music video ==
The music video for "Jaded" was directed by Jacob Bixenman and Brendan Walter. Cyrus shared a teaser video on May 15, 2023, and released the full-length video the following day.

== Live performance ==
Cyrus performed "Jaded" live for the first time, in the documentary concert special, Miley Cyrus – Endless Summer Vacation (Backyard Sessions), which was released on Disney+ on March 10, 2023.

== Accolades ==
Awards and nominations for "Jaded"
Organization	Year	Category	Result	Ref.
ASCAP Pop Music Awards	2024	Winning Songwriters and Publishers (Note: Awarded to co-writer Greg Kurstin, who is a member of the American Society of Composers, Authors and Publishers.)	Won	
BMI Pop Awards	2024	Most-Performed Songs of the Year (Note: Awarded to Sarah Aarons and Miley Cyrus, who are members of the Broadcast Music, Inc.)	Won	

== Credits and personnel ==
Credits adapted from Tidal, Pitchfork and the liner notes of Endless Summer Vacation.

=== Recording ===
- Recorded at No Expectations Studios, Los Angeles.
- Mixed at Windmill Lane Studios, Dublin.
- Mastered at Sterling Sound, Edgewater.

=== Personnel ===
- Sarah Aarons – songwriting
- Julian Burg – engineering
- Miley Cyrus – vocals, songwriting, executive production
- Greg Kurstin – songwriting, production, engineering, instrumentation
- Joe LaPorta – mastering engineering
- Mark "Spike" Stent – mixing engineering
- Matt Tuggle – engineering
- Matt Wolach – assistant engineering

== Charts ==
=== Weekly charts ===
Weekly chart performance
Chart (2023)	Peak position
Australia (ARIA)	75
Belgium (Ultratop 50 Wallonia)	19
Canada Hot 100 (Billboard)	30
Canada AC (Billboard)	14
Canada CHR/Top 40 (Billboard)	4
Canada Hot AC (Billboard)	16
CIS Airplay (TopHit)	134
Croatia International Airplay (HRT)	9
Czech Republic Airplay (ČNS IFPI)	26
Finland Airplay (Radiosoittolista)	42
France (SNEP)	198
Global 200 (Billboard)	44
Hungary (Rádiós Top 40)	33
Iceland (Tónlistinn)	30
Ireland (IRMA)	21
New Zealand Hot Singles (RMNZ)	2
Poland (Polish Airplay Top 100)	22
Portugal (AFP)	94
San Marino (SMRRTV Top 50)	13
Slovakia Airplay (ČNS IFPI)	29
Switzerland (Schweizer Hitparade)	70
UK Singles (Official Charts)	27
US Billboard Hot 100	56
US Adult Contemporary (Billboard)	20
US Adult Pop Airplay (Billboard)	10
US Dance Airplay (Billboard)	30
US Pop Airplay (Billboard)	14

=== Monthly charts ===
Monthly chart performance
Chart (2023)	Peak position
Paraguay (SPG)	75

=== Year-end charts ===
Year-end chart performance
Chart (2023)	Position
Canada (Canadian Hot 100)	52
US Adult Top 40 (Billboard)	29
US Mainstream Top 40 (Billboard)	39

== Certifications ==
Certifications for "Jaded"
Region	Certification	Certified units/sales
Brazil (Pro-Música Brasil)	Platinum	40,000^{‡}
Canada (Music Canada)	Gold	40,000^{‡}
New Zealand (RMNZ)	Gold	15,000^{‡}
Poland (ZPAV)	Gold	25,000^{‡}
United Kingdom (BPI)	Silver	200,000^{‡}
United States (RIAA)	Gold	500,000^{‡}
^{‡} Sales+streaming figures based on certification alone.

== Release history ==
Release history
Region	Date	Format(s)	Label	Ref.
United States	April 17, 2023	Adult contemporary radio; hot adult contemporary radio; modern adult contemporary radio	Columbia	
United States	April 18, 2023	Contemporary hit radio	Columbia	
Italy	July 13, 2023	Radio airplay	Sony	
