= River (Miley Cyrus song) =

Single by Miley Cyrus

from the album Endless Summer Vacation
- Released: March 13, 2023
- Recorded: 2022
- Studio: Ridgemont High (Los Angeles)
- Genre: Dance-pop; synth-pop
- Length: 2:42
- Label: Columbia
- Songwriters: Miley Cyrus; Justin Tranter; Thomas Hull; Tyler Johnson
- Producers: Kid Harpoon; Tyler Johnson

Miley Cyrus singles chronology
"Flowers" (2023)	"River" (2023)	"Jaded" (2023)

Music video
- "River" on YouTube

"River" is a song by the American singer Miley Cyrus. It was released on March 13, 2023, through Columbia Records as the second single from Cyrus' eighth studio album Endless Summer Vacation (2023). It was written by Cyrus, Justin Tranter, and the song producers Kid Harpoon and Tyler Johnson.

"River" reached the top 10 in Croatia, Hungary and Israel as well as number 32 on the Billboard Hot 100 and number 16 on the Billboard Global 200 chart.

== Background and development ==
On December 31, 2022, while hosting her NBC live special Miley's New Year's Eve Party, Cyrus announced the release of the new single "Flowers". Following its January 12, 2023, release, the song experienced widespread critical acclaim, as well as a global commercial success despite minimal promotion. "Flowers" became Cyrus' second number one single in the United States, hitting the top spot on Billboard Hot 100 on chart issue January 28 and staying there for six continuous weeks. A week prior to the lead single's release, the singer unveiled that her next album will be called Endless Summer Vacation with a release date of March 10.

Cyrus stated that "River" had begun as a much sadder song, since its development started within a turbulent time in her life. However, as the result of parts she organized, the track "evolved from a trouble where it felt like it never stopped raining, to then raining down love". The singer added, that in order to take part in the event, [one] needed to "bring [their] gay best friend". During the interview for Miley Cyrus – Endless Summer Vacation (Backyard Sessions), she admitted that "River" is about ejaculation. However this word was censored, resulting in theories regarding what she actually said. "River" shares the same production team as its previous single "Flowers" – it was produced by Kid Harpoon and Tyler Johnson, with additional writing done by the singer and Justin Tranter.

== Composition ==
"River" is a dance-pop and synth-pop song with elements of new wave, synthwave, post-disco and acid pop, described by Cyrus as a "dancefloor banger". The song features a Roland TB-303 acid line, pulsating synths, and guitars. Clash's Emily Swingle found it to be reminiscent of Cyrus's 2010 album Can't Be Tamed. Andrew Sacher of BrooklynVegan called the track a "retro synthpop banger," adding it would fit on her 2020 album Plastic Hearts. George Griffiths of the Official Charts Company described it as a "new wave-esque" tune, consisting of "wonky" instrumental inspired by 1980s synth-pop and electronic music. Chris Willman of Variety noted the song for the inclusion of "retro synth sounds" and further found inspiration from the style of Giorgio Moroder. Uproxx's Alex Gonzalez wrote that it follows the "dance-ready theme established by 'Flowers'". Nick Levine of NME felt that it "feels like a relative of her Stevie Nicks-inspired hit 'Midnight Sky'." Alexis Petridis of The Guardian called it an EDM anthem with "an undeniable dancefloor rush," despite its "tendency to flicker between squelchy video game sounds and out of kilter hip hop breaks." Mary Siroky of Consequence called it "the album's disco-inspired centerpiece", likening it to the 2020 albums Future Nostalgia by Dua Lipa and Chromatica by Lady Gaga.

Helen Brown of The Independent described the song as a "straightforward romancer about a paramour who's restored her faith after the love drought." Rolling Stone's Brittany Spanos felt that it is "buzzing with the hope of new love and the end of sexual and romantic droughts."

== Release and promotion ==
On March 7, 2023, Cyrus started teasing "River" through teasers released on her social media. She shared a portion of the song's instrumental, as well as its lyrics. On March 13, 2023, it was officially released to adult contemporary radio and its hot and modern sub-formats in the United States. The song was also sent to contemporary hit radio in the country the following day. A week later, the song impacted rhythmic contemporary radio. It impacted Italian radio airplay on April 20. Cyrus performed "River" live for the first time, in the documentary concert special, Miley Cyrus – Endless Summer Vacation (Backyard Sessions), which was released on Disney+ on March 10, 2023.

"River" commercially failed to achieve similar success as "Flowers", debuting at number 32 on the Billboard Hot 100, charting alongside four other songs from the album. (Note: Other songs by Miley Cyrus present on the chart were: "Flowers" (1), "Jaded" (56), "Thousand Miles" (68), and "Rose Colored Lenses" (91).) It was backed-up by 13.7 million radio audience impressions, leading to the single's entry on the Radio Songs chart at number 48. On other airplay surveys, it appeared at numbers 26 and 27 on Adult Top 40 and Pop Airplay, respectively, peaking at number 17 on the former and number 20 on the latter. It also debuted on the Hot Dance/Electronic Songs at number two, becoming the highest debut on the chart since "Hold Me Closer" (2022) by Elton John and Britney Spears, as well as Cyrus's highest peaking on the chart yet, surpassing her 2013 collaboration with will.i.am, "Fall Down". It crowned its steaming component chart with 10.9 million streams, while on Dance/Electronic Digital Song Sales "River" entered at number four with 1,600 downloads. Elsewhere, it debuted at numbers 16 and 22 in the UK Singles Chart and ARIA Singles Chart, respectively.

== Critical reception ==
Sal Cinquemani of Slant Magazine noted the song's "enticing, high-stakes chorus worthy of Cyrus's fierce vocals and personality." Pitchfork's Shaad D'Souza called it one of the best songs on Endless Summer Vacation, adding: "Cyrus effectively showcases who she is at this point in her career: Mature but still messy, not above a theatrical turn of phrase ('You're pourin' down, baby, drown me out') and, very occasionally, still in tune with the big-hearted optimism that characterized her earlier music." David Cobbals of The Line of Best Fit called it a "confused mash of one too many ideas that leave it being more underwhelming than interesting."

== Music video ==
The black-and-white music video for "River" was directed by Jacob Bixenman. On March 7, 2023, Cyrus announced its release date and shared a teaser video. The music video premiered on March 10, 2023. It features Cyrus in a black minidress, dancing under a spotlight on a raised, lit-up platform, joined by a group of shirtless men. Near the end, rain begins to fall. Erica Gonzales of Elle called the video "sleek and sexy", while Billboard's Glenn Rowley called it "moody".

== Accolades ==
Awards and nominations for "River"
Organization	Year	Category	Result	Ref.
MTV Video Music Awards	2023	Best Editing	Nominated	

== Credits and personnel ==
Credits adapted from Tidal, Pitchfork and the liner notes of Endless Summer Vacation.

=== Recording ===
- Recorded at Ridgemont High, Los Angeles.
- Mixed at Windmill Lane Studios, Dublin.
- Mastered at Sterling Sound, Edgewater.

=== Personnel ===
- Miley Cyrus – vocals, songwriting, executive production
- Kid Harpoon – songwriting, production, drums, bass guitar, guitar, synth bass, synthesizer, drum programming, additional vocal
- Ivan Jackson – horns
- Tyler Johnson – songwriting, drum programming, synth bass, synthesizer, additional vocal
- Joe LaPorta – mastering engineering
- Brian Rajaratnam – engineering
- Mark "Spike" Stent – mixing engineering
- Justin Tranter – songwriting
- Matt Wolach – assistant engineering

== Charts ==
=== Weekly charts ===
Weekly chart performance for "River"
Chart (2023)	Peak position
Australia (ARIA)	22
Austria (Ö3 Austria Top 40)	24
Canada Hot 100 (Billboard)	17
Canada CHR/Top 40 (Billboard)	25
Canada Hot AC (Billboard)	33
Croatia International Airplay (Top lista)	7
Czech Republic Singles Digital (ČNS IFPI)	47
France (SNEP)	132
Germany (GfK)	35
Global 200 (Billboard)	16
Greece International (IFPI)	28
Hungary (Single Top 40)	5
Israel International Airplay (Media Forest)	6
Ireland (IRMA)	13
Latvia Streaming (LaIPA)	15
Lithuania (AGATA)	20
Netherlands (Dutch Top 40)	29
Netherlands (Single Top 100)	53
New Zealand (Recorded Music NZ)	30
Norway (VG-lista)	32
Panama (PRODUCE)	30
Poland (Polish Streaming Top 100)	28
Portugal (AFP)	30
San Marino Airplay (SMRTV Top 50)	29
Slovakia Airplay (ČNS IFPI)	19
Slovakia Singles Digital (ČNS IFPI)	39
Spain (PROMUSICAE)	73
Sweden (Sverigetopplistan)	56
Switzerland (Schweizer Hitparade)	30
UK Singles (OCC)	16
US Billboard Hot 100	32
US Adult Contemporary (Billboard)	29
US Adult Pop Airplay (Billboard)	17
US Hot Dance/Electronic Songs (Billboard)	2
US Pop Airplay (Billboard)	20
US Rhythmic Airplay (Billboard)	37
Venezuela (Record Report)	39
Vietnam (Vietnam Hot 100)	57

=== Year-end charts ===
Year-end chart performance for "River"
Chart (2023)	Position
US Hot Dance/Electronic Songs (Billboard)	11

== Certifications ==
Certifications for "River"
Region	Certification	Certified units/sales
Brazil (Pro-Música Brasil)	Platinum	40,000^{‡}
Canada (Music Canada)	Gold	40,000^{‡}
^{‡} Sales+streaming figures based on certification alone.

== Release history ==
"River" release history
Region	Date	Format(s)	Label	Ref.
United States	March 13, 2023	Adult contemporary radio; hot adult contemporary radio; modern adult contemporary radio	Columbia	
United States	March 14, 2023	Contemporary hit radio	Columbia	
United States	March 21, 2023	Rhythmic contemporary radio	Columbia	
Italy	April 20, 2023	Radio airplay	Sony	
