= Adore You (Miley Cyrus song) =

2013 single by Miley Cyrus

Single by Miley Cyrus

from the album Bangerz
- Released: December 17, 2013
- Recorded: 2013
- Studio: Glenwood Studios (Burbank, CA)
- Genre: Pop; R&B
- Length: 4:38 (album version); 4:09 (radio edit)
- Label: RCA
- Songwriters: Stacy Barthe; Oren Yoel
- Producer: Oren Yoel

Miley Cyrus singles chronology
"Feelin' Myself" (2013)	"Adore You" (2013)	"Lucy in the Sky with Diamonds" (2014)

Music video
- "Adore You" on YouTube

"Adore You" is a song recorded by American singer Miley Cyrus. It is the opening track of her fourth studio album Bangerz (2013) and was released as its third and final single on December 17, 2013, by RCA Records. The song was written and produced by Oren Yoel, with additional songwriting provided by Stacy Barthe. "Adore You" is a pop and R&B ballad in which Cyrus discusses her affection towards her boyfriend.

"Adore You" received favorable reviews from music critics, who complimented its overall production and Cyrus' vocals; it was further recognized as being among the more conservative offerings from its parent album. The song peaked at number 21 on the Billboard Hot 100. It performed moderately on national record charts throughout Europe and Oceania, with a gold certification in Australia. The music video for "Adore You" was officially premiered through Vevo on December 26, 2013. It depicts Cyrus suggestively posing in a bed and a bathtub, and is interspersed with night vision footage that resembles a celebrity sex tape.

== Composition and release ==
"Adore You"
A 20-second sample of "Adore You" by Miley Cyrus, where a portion of the chorus is heard

"Adore You" is a pop and R&B ballad, which lasts for four minutes and 38 seconds. The song performs in common time, at a tempo of 60 beats per minute. Played in the key of C major, the chord structure of C—Fmaj7—Am is followed throughout, and Cyrus's vocal range spans from G_{3} to A_{4}. Its lyrics discuss "power imbalance in love"; in the chorus, she states her affection towards her boyfriend through the lines "When you say you need me / Know I need you more / Boy, I adore you", although Kyle Fowle of Slant Magazine felt that Cyrus' reliance in her partner is admittedly detrimental to her personal well-being as the song continues.

In December 2013, Cyrus announced that "Adore You" would be serviced as the third single from her fourth studio album, Bangerz (2013). Its launch followed the tracks "We Can't Stop" and "Wrecking Ball", which were respectively released as the first and second singles from the record earlier that year. It was originally scheduled to impact mainstream radio stations in the United States on January 6, 2014, although it was released three weeks earlier on December 17.

On December 18, Cyrus unveiled the official artwork for "Adore You" through her Instagram and Twitter accounts. It shows the lower half of Cyrus' face covered by a bouquet of roses, with the title "Adore You" stylized in an all-capitalized sans serif font. The artwork was complimented for its uncharacteristically conservative nature in comparison to her earlier projects which by this time had become associated with Cyrus' new sexually provocative public image.

== Critical reception ==
Upon its release, "Adore You" received favorable reviews from music critics, who complimented its overall production and Cyrus' vocals. Heather Phares from AllMusic felt that opening Bangerz with an "unabashedly romantic slow song" was "almost as bold a move as the publicity events that preceded the album's release." Jon Dolan of Rolling Stone, who had a similar opinion to Phares', called the track a "starkly beautiful album opener". Nick Catucci of Entertainment Weekly complimented the track for "[flaunting] a key facet of her versatile voice: the throaty diva swoon." Kitty Empire from The Guardian suggested that "Adore You" was one of the "least showy and most successful cuts" from Bangerz. Writing for Slant Magazine, Kyle Fowle appreciated the "careful balance of vulnerability and strength" for "[elevating the] potentially tired themes [of destructive dependence]". Jason Lipshutz of Billboard thought that the song was "emotionally mature but not overly provocative" and a "[wise]" choice for opening the album. However, in a more mixed review, Evan Sawdey from PopMatters felt that the track "[featured] almost zero rising action [and did] little to drive the point home."

== Commercial performance ==
"Adore You" was the highest-charting non-single from Bangerz in the United States, having entered at number 42 on the Billboard Hot 100 the week that the record was released in October. In its second week, the track dropped to number 79 before falling off the following week. After its accompanying music video was released in December, "Adore You" re-entered the chart at its new peak position of number 22. It has since risen to number 21. The track underperformed relative to "We Can't Stop" and "Wrecking Ball", which respectively peaked at numbers two and one after being serviced as the first and second singles from Bangerz. However, the track debuted at number 1 on the Billboard Streaming Songs chart the week that its music video was released. Elsewhere in North America, the song reached number 36 on the Canadian Hot 100.

"Adore You" charted moderately on national record charts throughout Europe. It respectively reached numbers 21 and 27 on the Scottish Singles Chart and the UK Singles Chart, both of which are managed by the Official Charts Company. The song additionally charted at number 24 on the Danish Tracklisten, number 44 on the Irish Singles Chart, and number 50 on the Spanish PROMUSICAE. The track peaked at number 143 on the French SNEP, and reached numbers 19 and 20 on the Belgian Ultratip charts in Flanders and Wallonia, respectively, which represent the songs that failed to enter the primary Ultratop chart. In Oceania, "Adore You" reached number 25 on the Australian ARIA Charts and number 15 on the Official New Zealand Music Chart; in the former country, the track was certified double platinum in 2023.

== Music video ==
The accompanying music video for "Adore You" directed by Rankin was scheduled to be premiered through Vevo on December 26, 2013; in the days preceding its release, Cyrus uploaded two brief previews of the clip through her Instagram account. However, the final product was leaked on the evening of December 25, 2013, one day earlier than expected; this led to speculation that Cyrus intentionally leaked the video as a publicity stunt, although she later refuted the accusations through her Twitter account. It depicts Cyrus suggestively posing in a bed and a bathtub, and is interspersed with night vision footage that appears to simulate a sex tape.

Several critics discussed whether the music video for "Adore You" was more provocative than the visuals for Cyrus' previous single "Wrecking Ball". Noting the frequent sexually explicit gestures seen throughout, a writer for Fox News wondered if Cyrus had successfully created a music video "that's somehow more scandalous" than its predecessor, although suggested that its commercial success would suffer from its unauthorized release. Writing for MTV News, Gil Kaufman complimented Cyrus for not appearing particularly concerned with outdoing her previous controversies, and nonetheless felt that Cyrus "ups the ante even more" in the video; he noted the inclusion of "envelope-pushing imagery" often used by mainstream artists including Madonna, Lady Gaga, and Katy Perry, and cited the clip as "the latest example of Cyrus leaving her girlish ways behind."

== Live performances ==
An episode of MTV Unplugged starring Cyrus premiered through MTV on January 29, 2014; she performed an acoustic version of "Adore You", among several additional tracks from Bangerz. The entire episode followed a theme inspired by country music. During "Adore You" in particular, Cyrus was dressed in a matching jean jacket, bra, and pants set; she performed the full track while standing in place on the stage.

Cyrus has performed the song during her ongoing Bangerz Tour. Cyrus wore a black sequined cat suit during the performance. During this segment of the tour, a kiss cam was featured on the Jumbotron of the hosting arena. The performance also featured a red and white gingham horse during select shows. During a performance on February 22, Cyrus kissed recording artist Katy Perry in the middle of the track, which resulted in a minor conflict between the women. During a later showing on February 27, Cyrus invited Matt Peterson, who notably asked Cyrus to his high school prom through YouTube that January, onstage while she sang.

== Cedric Gervais remix ==
"Adore You (Remix)"

Single by Miley Cyrus vs. Cedric Gervais
- Released: March 11, 2014
- Genre: EDM; house
- Length: 3:35 (radio version); 6:42 (club version)
- Label: Spinnin'; RCA
- Songwriters: Stacy Barthe; Oren Yoel
- Producer: Cedric Gervais

Miley Cyrus singles chronology
"Feelin' Myself" (2013)	"Adore You (Remix)" (2014)	"Lucy in the Sky with Diamonds" (2014)

Cedric Gervais singles chronology
"Young and Beautiful (Remix)" (2013)	"Adore You (Remix)" (2014)	"Through the Night" (2014)

Music video
- "Adore You (Remix)" on YouTube

A remix of "Adore You" produced by Cedric Gervais was premiered on February 13, 2014, and was officially released on March 3, 2014, by his record label Spinnin' Records. It replaces the original mid-tempo pop music elements with an up-tempo dance music production, while maintaining Cyrus' original vocals. The remix received generally favorable reviews from music critics, who felt that it complimented the album version. An accompanying music video was premiered through Spinnin' Records on February 13, 2014, and is composed of re-edited footage of the clip for the original version of the song.

=== Background and composition ===
"Adore You" (Remix)
A 22-second sample of the remix of "Adore You" by Miley Cyrus vs. Cedric Gervais. In the snippet of the chorus provided, the newly included drop is heard.

Cyrus first contacted Gervais over the possibility of remixing "Adore You" in January 2014, shortly after he received the Grammy Award for Best Remixed Recording, Non-Classical for his version of "Summertime Sadness" by Lana Del Rey.

Gervais' version of the track surfaced online on February 11, although it was not officially acknowledged by Gervais' record label Spinnin' Records until the premiere of its music video on February 13. It was announced through Gervais' official website that it would be officially released on March 3, 2014.

The remixed version of "Adore You" substitutes the original "amorphous rhythms" with prominent elements of dance music, which incorporates a "thumping beat" and progresses into a "dazzling drop" during the chorus. The production maintains the "emotional center of the song" while adding "a cascading signal boost." An accompanying music video for the Cedric Gervais remix of "Adore You" was premiered through Spinnin' Records on February 13, 2014; it is a re-edited version of the original music video, primarily using scenes where Cyrus is seen lying under a bed sheet dressed in her bra and underwear. Mike Wass from Idolator felt that the remix "works quite well with the existing visual".

=== Reception and performance ===
Gervais' remix of "Adore You" received generally favorable reviews from music critics. Jason Lipshutz from Billboard and Lewis Corner from Digital Spy wrote favorably of the redone production; the former complimented the conversion of the original "yearning ballad" into a "first-pumping anthem", while the latter appreciated its transition into a "club anthem" from the first "romantic ballad". Noting that the original version of the track had not charted as strongly as Cyrus' previous singles "We Can't Stop" and "Wrecking Ball", Esi Mensah from Entertainmentwise thought that Gervais "rescued the track" after becoming "a fun electronic dance song."

James Shotwell from Under the Gun Review felt that the album version of the track was "a bit of a snoozer", and jokingly said to attempt to "resist" enjoying the remix. Vanyaland contributor Michael Marotta agreed that the song benefited from "a much-needed energy injection" that he hoped would "[get] exposed" through Cyrus' Bangerz Tour. Writing for Idolator, Mike Wass commented the track worked better with the original "minimal production" and thought that the remix was "cheesy", although he admitted that he "wouldn't switch channels if it came on the radio."

== Credits and personnel ==
Credits adapted from the liner notes of Bangerz.

Production locations

- Recorded at Glenwood Studios, Burbank, California
- Mixed at Larrabee Studios, North Hollywood, Los Angeles, California

Personnel

- Oren Yoel – songwriter, producer
- Stacy Barthe – songwriter
- Delbert Bowers – assistant
- Miley Cyrus – lead vocals
- Paul Dateh – violin
- Doron Dina – assistant
- Chris Galland – assistant
- Todd Hurtt – assistant
- Manny Marroquin – mixing
- Sean Tallman – recording
- Dr. Luke – programmer, instrumentation

== Charts ==
=== Weekly charts ===
Weekly chart performance for "Adore You"
Chart (2013–2014)	Peak position
Australia (ARIA)	25
Belgium (Ultratip Bubbling Under Flanders)	19
Belgium (Ultratip Bubbling Under Wallonia)	20
Canada Hot 100 (Billboard)	36
CIS Airplay (TopHit)	117
Czech Republic Airplay (ČNS IFPI)	33
Denmark (Tracklisten)	24
France (SNEP)	143
Ireland (IRMA)	44
New Zealand (Recorded Music NZ)	15
Scottish Singles Sales (Official Charts)	21
Spain (Promusicae)	39
UK Singles (Official Charts)	27
US Billboard Hot 100	21
US Adult Pop Airplay (Billboard)	33
US Dance Club Songs (Billboard)	42
US Pop Airplay (Billboard)	15

=== Year-end charts ===
Year-end chart rankings for "Adore You"
Chart (2014)	Position
US Billboard Hot 100	100

== Certifications ==
Certifications for "Adore You"
Region	Certification	Certified units/sales
Australia (ARIA)	2× Platinum	140,000^{‡}
Brazil (Pro-Música Brasil)	Platinum	60,000^{‡}
Canada (Music Canada)	Platinum	80,000^{*}
New Zealand (RMNZ)	2× Platinum	60,000^{‡}
Norway (IFPI Norway)	Gold	30,000^{‡}
Sweden (GLF)	Gold	20,000^{‡}
United Kingdom (BPI)	Gold	400,000^{‡}
United States (RIAA)	3× Platinum	3,000,000^{‡}
Streaming
Denmark (IFPI Danmark)	Gold	1,300,000^{†}
^{*} Sales figures based on certification alone.^{‡} Sales+streaming figures based on certification alone.^{†} Streaming-only figures based on certification alone.

== Release history ==
Release dates for "Adore You"
Region	Date	Format	Version	Label	Ref.
United States	December 17, 2013	Contemporary hit radio	Original	RCA	
Italy	January 24, 2014	Radio airplay	Original	RCA	
Italy	February 20, 2014	Radio airplay	Cedric Gervais remix	RCA	
United States	March 3, 2014	Digital download (Beatport exclusive)	Cedric Gervais remix	Spinnin'	
United States	March 11, 2014	Digital download	Cedric Gervais remix	Spinnin'	
United Kingdom	March 11, 2014	Digital download	Cedric Gervais remix	Spinnin'	
