= Bangerz Tour =

2014 concert tour by Miley Cyrus

- Transcontinental tour by Miley Cyrus
- Location: North America; South America; Europe; Oceania
- Associated album: Bangerz
- Start date: February 14, 2014
- End date: October 23, 2014
- Legs: 5
- No. of shows: 78
- Supporting acts: My Crazy Girlfriend; Icona Pop; Sky Ferreira; Lily Allen
- Box office: $68.9 million (Note: US$93.7 million in 2025 dollars.)

Miley Cyrus concert chronology
- Gypsy Heart Tour (2011); Bangerz Tour (2014); Milky Milky Milk Tour (2015)

The Bangerz Tour was the fourth concert tour by American singer Miley Cyrus. It was held in support of her fourth studio album, Bangerz (2013). The tour visited the Americas, Europe, and Oceania through five legs. It spanned from February 14 to October 23, 2014. Cyrus performed all songs from the album excluding "Hands in the Air", among covers of songs by other artists. Cyrus' allergic reaction along with logistical issues led to three cancellations in the tour's scheduled dates. A show in Santo Domingo, Dominican Republic was banned by the government citing moral grounds.

The tour was noted for its sexual imagery. Described as "campy", "surreal", and "raunchy", it received acclaim from critics, who praised Cyrus' stage presence, vocals, originality, and self-mockery. It was the 16th highest-grossing tour of 2014, earning $62.9 million. Footage from the shows at Barcelona and Lisbon was filmed, airing on NBC on July 6, 2014. It was then released on DVD and Blu-ray on March 24, 2015.

== Background and development ==
"Literally my whole life is revolving around this tour right now. Diane Martel..... and I, we're putting together this tour that's going to be insane..... The minute you step into my arena, the whole thing feels like you're a part of this crazy different world and you step in to a show the minute you walk in the door, rather than it being a show when I come onstage."

— Cyrus describing the preparation and concept for the Bangerz Tour.

In 2012, Cyrus announced plans to focus on her film career, effectively putting her musical endeavors on hiatus. That year, she appeared in the films LOL and So Undercover. She was also confirmed as a primary voice actress in the feature film Hotel Transylvania, but dropped out of the project to coordinate a musical comeback. In January 2013, Cyrus ended her recording contract with Hollywood Records, under which she released the studio albums Meet Miley Cyrus (2007), Breakout (2008), Can't Be Tamed (2010), and EP The Time of Our Lives (2009). Later that month, she signed a recording contract with RCA Records. In March, she confirmed that her fourth studio album would be released by the end of 2013.

The final product, Bangerz, was released on October 4, 2013. At Metacritic, which assigns a normalized rating out of 100 to reviews from mainstream critics, the album received an average score of 61, which indicates "generally favorable reviews", based on 21 reviews. It debuted at number one on the U.S. Billboard 200, having moved 270,000 units, and charted strongly in several countries worldwide. During her appearance on Today on October 7, Cyrus first mentioned her intentions to tour in 2014. On October 26, she made a surprise appearance on another episode of Saturday Night Live to officially announce the Bangerz Tour. Claire Atkinson from the New York Post reported that concert promoters Live Nation Entertainment and AEG Live engaged in much competition to promote the tour, with the former ultimately being selected to represent the North American leg after agreeing to pay Cyrus $500,000 per presentation.

On November 11, a series of three promotional videos were released to YouTube to promote the Bangerz Tour. Cyrus originally announced that The Blonds and Kenzo were enlisted as costume designers in December, although Roberto Cavalli was later confirmed for the position after six sketches of costume designs were released in January 2014. Cyrus began rehearsals later that month, at which time John Kricfalusi, creator of The Ren & Stimpy Show, was enlisted to create artwork and animation for the tour.

During a teleconference on July 30, 2014, Cyrus stated that the goal of the tour was to make something that was "really fun", "real" and had a "good energy about it". She further stated- "I think the best thing for an artist is to see people sing along to your songs, and also to have people participating in your show... this show is a really hard show to not want to get up and be involved... there's a feminist energy there, and if people enjoy taking a chance and coming to a show that's different, I really appreciate that. I hope my fans are kind of inspired by my show to take it to the next level."

== Opening acts ==
The three main opening acts of the tour were Icona Pop, Sky Ferreira and Lily Allen. Icona Pop praised Cyrus – "She's crazy and she's fun but that's her expressing herself on stage and in her music. But she's really a smart woman and everything on stage was her idea. She's the boss of everything and it's just very inspiring to be around someone who's having a lot of fun because she's doing stuff her way and with her friends and her crew, but in a very professional way." Ferreira stated – "I really like when she does the acoustic set [in her show]. I think that's kind of the biggest fuck-you to everyone who's talked shit about her, because she has a really great voice. The whole show kind of shows everyone up. No one can deny it." Allen praised Cyrus and the tour, stating – "I saw it at the O2 in London [in May], and I'm not exaggerating when I say it's one of the best shows that I've seen in years... It's up there with an Oasis show or The Stone Roses or something. It's kind of incredible to watch – she's a real force. There's no two ways about it, she's meant to be up there doing that." She also added that the Bangerz tour stage production was "impressive", but even without the bells and whistles, Cyrus would have been able to pull off an "unforgettable pop experience."

== Concert synopsis ==
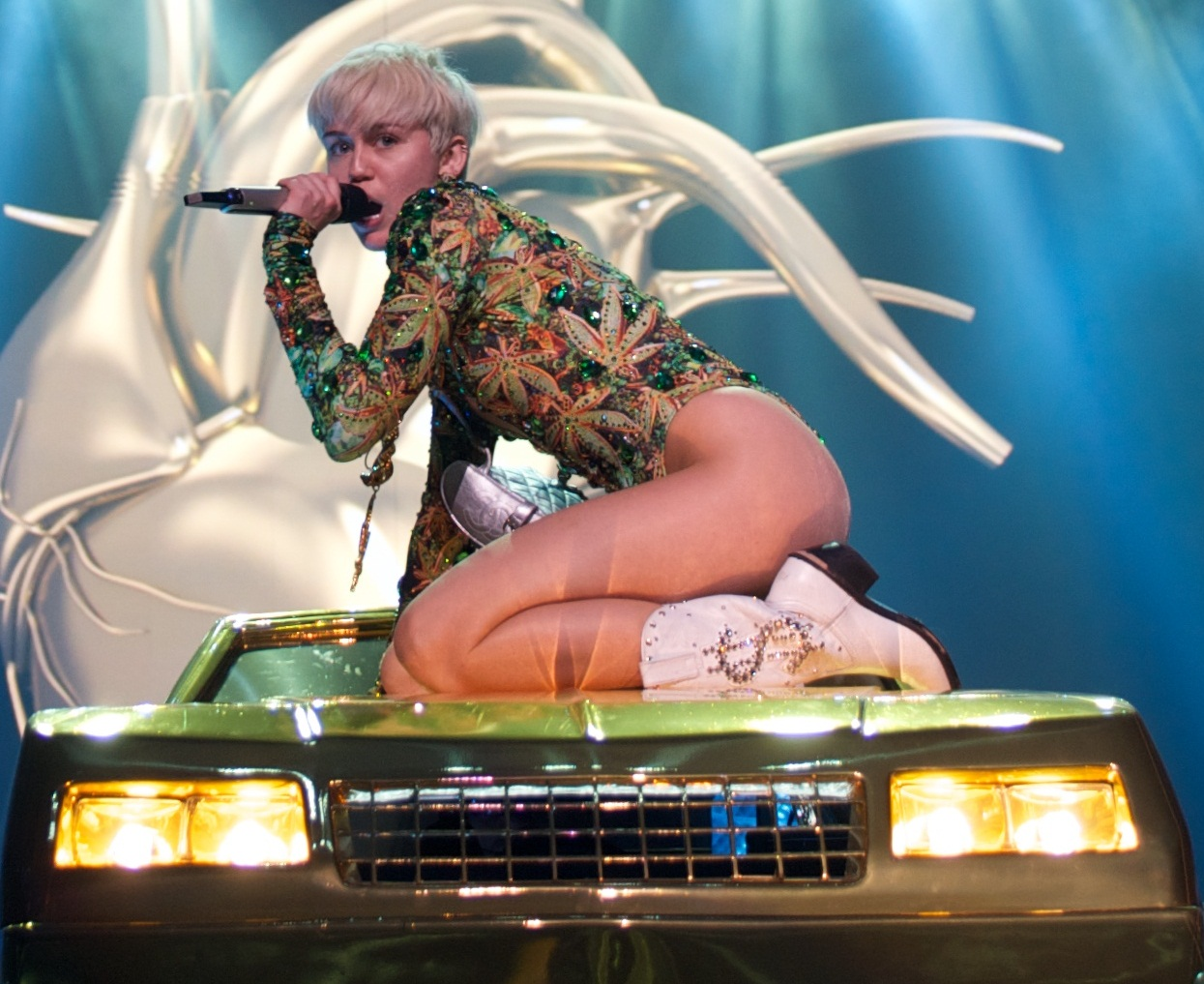
Miley performing "Love, Money, Party"

The tour commenced with a close-up of Cyrus' face on the video screen while her dancers appeared on stage. Cyrus, in a red leotard, entered the stage from a slide that appeared where her tongue would be located; and performed "SMS (Bangerz)", joined by people dressed as furries and cartoon characters while an animation by John Kricfalusi, creator of The Ren and Stimpy Show, plays on screen. "4x4" followed with Cyrus' dancers dressed as chickens. Following a brief outfit change to a green marijuana-inspired outfit, she re-appeared singing "Love Money Party" on a golden car (a 1983 Chevrolet Monte Carlo SS modified in the style of a donk) before a larger-than-life-size puppet of Big Sean was unveiled to rap his verse. Cyrus later jumped off the car as it was driving up the stage and threw counterfeit money featuring her face into the audience.

Afterwards "My Darlin'" and "Maybe You're Right" were performed. Cyrus went backstage and changed into a red latex outfit to perform "FU" and a country version of "Do My Thang". Next, Cyrus sang "Get It Right" while pictures of candy representing female genitalia were shown on the video screen. The next act began with Cyrus, in a black and white feathered outfit, performing "Can't Be Tamed", accompanied by an inflatable replica of her late dog Floyd. Following this performance, Cyrus left for a quick change, while a video featuring an animated Cyrus on a jet ski was shown on the video screen. A kiss cam appeared as Cyrus returned to stage and sang "Adore You". During the performance of "Drive", Cyrus prompted the audience to put their flashlights on their phones on and wave them while blue lasers were displayed from under the stage.

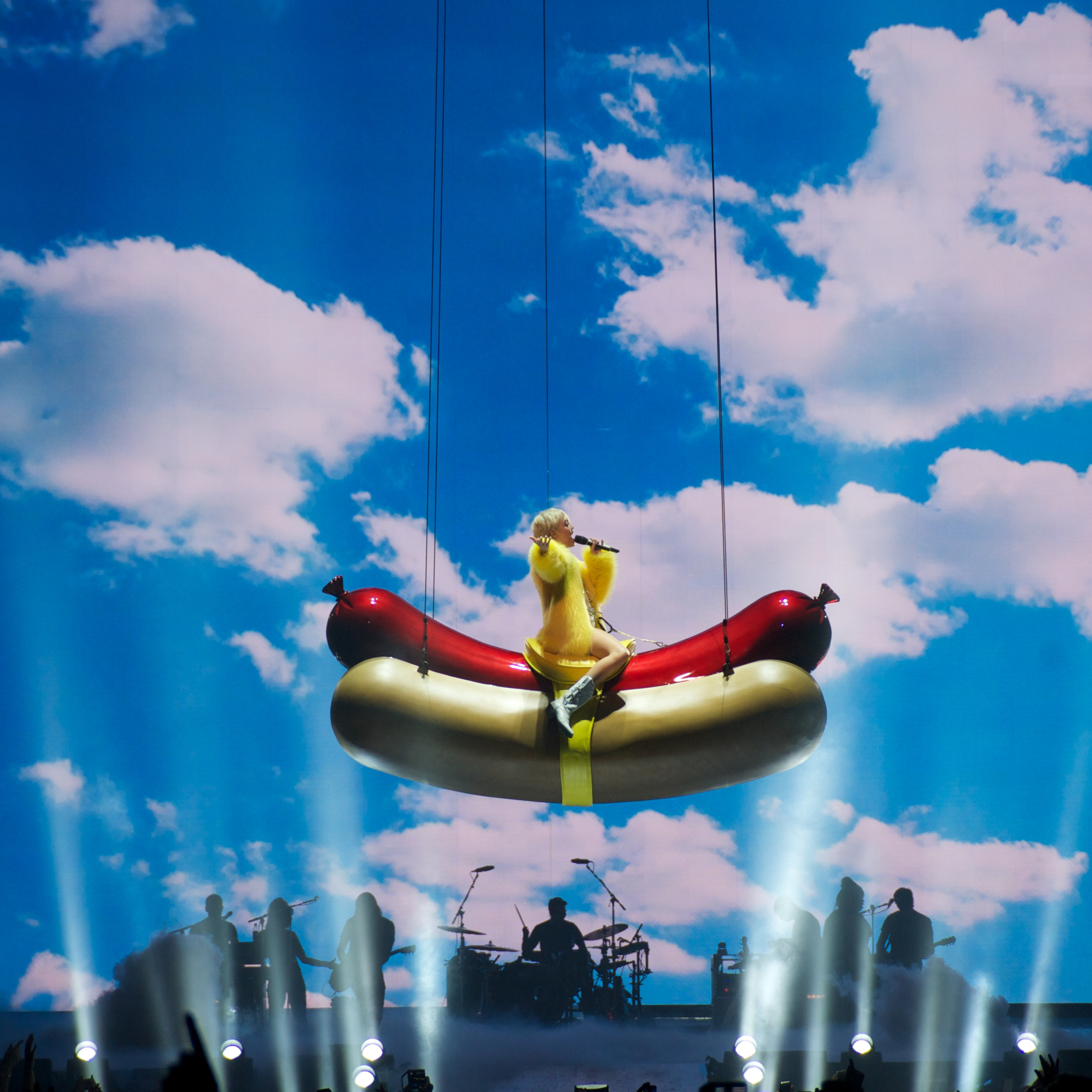
Cyrus performing "Someone Else"

During an outfit change, a black and white video interlude of a partially dressed Cyrus making several poses while wearing sexual bondage, with the track "Fitzpleasure" by Alt-J playing in the background was shown on the video screen. However, after May 1, a short film called "Miley Cyrus: Tongue Tied", playing 30s' "Stockholm Syndrome" featuring Zoe, played instead. Cyrus then appeared on a smaller stage at the back of the arena in an oversized shirt with her face on it for a performance of "Rooting for My Baby". She then performed covers of "Hey Ya!" by Outkast and "Jolene" by Dolly Parton. After exiting the B stage, an unreleased track titled "Pretty Girls (Fun)" played while the LA Bakers appeared on the main stage dancing and twerking to the song. Cyrus then re-appeared on the main stage for a performance of "23" by Mike Will Made It (in which Cyrus was a featured artist). Cyrus then had a brief outfit change before performing "On My Own" where she was surrounded by her dancers dressed as colorful animals, and "Someone Else" where she rode a flying hot dog above the audience. Following this, she re-appeared in a white leotard to perform "We Can't Stop" and "Wrecking Ball" followed with dark blue lasers being projected from behind the video screen. For the encore she came back on stage in an American themed outfit wearing a short blonde wig and a cowboy hat for the performance of "Party in the U.S.A." while some of her dancers were dressed as the Statue of Liberty, Abraham Lincoln, the Liberty Bell and Mount Rushmore. Cyrus then said her goodbyes to the audience and exited the stage while fireworks were shot into the sky with elements of the United States National Anthem playing in the background.

== Critical reception ==
After Cyrus' premiere performance, the Bangerz Tour received praise from critics. Victoria Pavlova from Contact Music spoke favorably of Cyrus' stage presence and wardrobe, and stated that her entrance was "enough to recommend the show right there." Mike Wass from Idolator described the performance as being "weird and wonderful" and jokingly called it the musical version of the film Spring Breakers (2012). He appreciated that she "[owned] all her headline-grabbing antics from 2013 (the twerking, that foam finger and those skimpy outfits)" and mainly performed tracks from Bangerz, although he was more critical of her vocal delivery during the slower tracks and the inclusion of "filler" songs, which he felt "[didn't] quite cut it." Writing for Rolling Stone, Denise Sheppard noted that "the fact that there really wasn't anything jaw-droppingly shocking about the entire night" was the most unexpected component of the concert, and felt that Cyrus achieved her goal of being viewed as a legitimate singer instead of primarily receiving attention for her controversial behavior. She also opined that "her taste in other people's music is quite impressive", commending the uses of "Fitzpleasure", "Jolene", and "Hey Ya!".

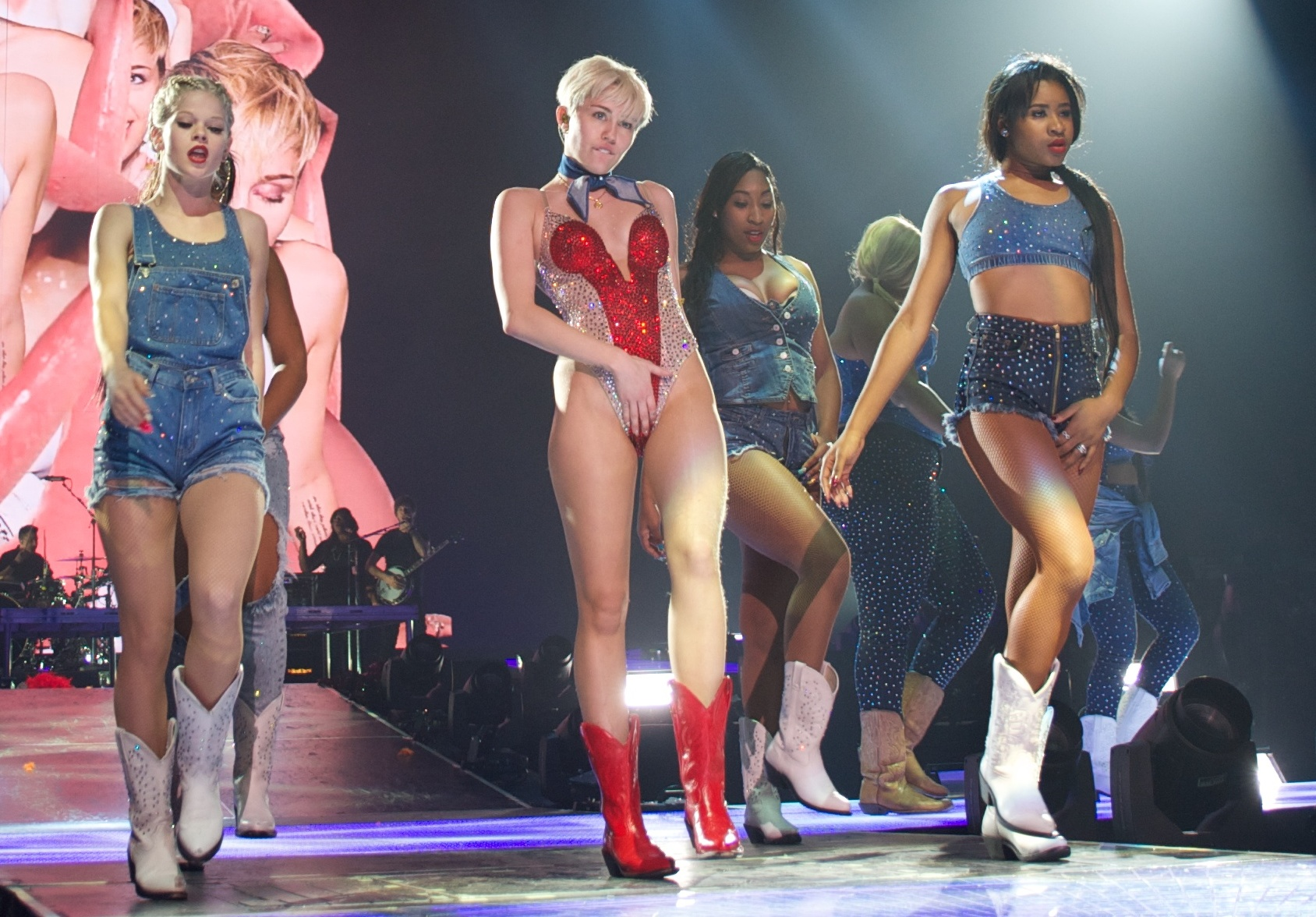
Cyrus performing "Do My Thang"

Jane Stevenson from the Toronto Sun praised Cyrus' performance, writing, "Cyrus seemed dead serious about having some very colorful fun for two hours. She opened her show sliding down a giant pink tongue extended from her gaping mouth on an enormous video screen that showed her pretty face in all its blue-eyed, blond-cropped hair glory... It was a real spectacle." Shawn Conner from USA Today wrote that Cyrus' performance proved that "the time has come to move the conversation [...] beyond the notorious move she pulled on Robin Thicke at last year's MTV Video Music Awards"; he spoke favorably of the on-screen visuals seen alongside Cyrus and appreciated that she did not lip sync along pre-recorded tracks. Conner also opined that "Cyrus has the charisma and maybe the smarts to be the post-Madonna Madonna", and added that she appeared to be "approachable, on- and off-stage, in a way that Madonna never did."

However, in a more mixed review, François Marchand from The Vancouver Sun provided a more negative review; he suggested that Cyrus was "a pop artist in a shiny, attention-grabbing wrapper", and that the performance was neither "the evolution of pop, female empowerment, [or] mindless fun", but rather "capitalism at work". Sam Lansky writing for Time magazine praised the singer's performance in Brooklyn calling her one of the "most dynamic performers of her generation." Adam Graham from The Detroit News gave a positive review of the performance in Auburn, writing the show "is like a blast of confetti to the face, a dizzying, non-stop party that leaves you reeling and questioning what you just saw."

On July 30, 2014, John J. Moser of The Morning Call included the tour in his list of Top 3 Concerts alongside tours by Billy Joel and Katy Perry stating "...Miley shockers these days are about her topless desert photos and cameo in Pharrell's newest video. That doesn't mean the show's not still worth seeing." Glenn Gamboa of the Newsday praised the show and Cyrus' vocals, writing "...She then proceeded to take on Bob Dylan's "You're Gonna Make Me Lonesome When You Go", The Smiths’ "There Is a Light That Never Goes Out", Lana Del Rey's "Summertime Sadness" and Dolly Parton's "Jolene" with no special effects or choreographed moves – just her powerful voice. That she can get an arena filled with teens and young adults to sing along with Dolly Parton's country hit from 1973 speaks to the power of Cyrus. And, for the most part, during this version of the Bangerz tour, she uses that power for good." Kelly Roncace of the South Jersey Times reviewed the show positively, writing, "While Miley has been surrounded by some controversy since her transformation from child star to a less inhibited adult performer, the artist's raw talent and ability to entertain was evident from the first note of the show to the last."

Dan DeLuca of The Philadelphia Inquirer, also gave a positive review, writing, "... she was straightforward and serious minded when it came to augmenting her own material – she performed all of Bangerz, plus two older hits, "Can't Be Tamed" and "Party in the U.S.A." – with a selection of covers designed to challenge herself. The show is also funny, and doesn't come off as pre-programmed and scripted as most over the top arena spectacles... that unpredictable eclecticism is just a broad stroke representation of the new genre-jumping normal, and it's from some combination of those elements that Cyrus will become a new Someone Else." Scott Mervis of the Pittsburgh Post-Gazette praised the show and Cyrus' vocals, calling it an "over-the-top dance-pop extravaganza with a wacky sense of humor, artful musical gestures and a big-voiced playful star who seemed thrilled to be there." Théoden Janes of The Charlotte Observer praised the show, writing, "Beneath all the audaciousness was a fair amount of awesomeness. Cyrus didn't lip-synch a word. Her voice was both flexible and appropriately raw. Throughout, she managed to come across as gracious and accessible, bantering with fans and accepting pretty much any gift that came her way."

Chris Talbott of the Star Tribune provided a positive review, opining that Cyrus showed her growing prowess as an entertainer during the show. He also praised Cyrus' vocal delivery and called the show a "real spectacle." A critic from the Nashville Scene praised the show and Cyrus' strong vocal delivery. He further commented on the show's theme, writing, "It was an impressive pop-culture aggregation and the entire production was like a party scene from an over-serious 90s movie about a future dystopia...The thing about Miley Cyrus is that she's a genuinely beautiful woman unafraid of making herself look like a total goober: it's hard not to be charmed by that." Blake Hannon provided a positive review, praising Cyrus' powerful vocal delivery and calling the show a "campy, cartoonishly over-the-top spectacle and musical showcase that was unforgettable... You can't help but admire (or scratch your head at) the girl's go-big-or-go-home approach." Kevin C. Johnson of St. Louis Post-Dispatch provided a favorable review, praising Cyrus' "solid and consistent" vocal delivery and calling the show a "silly and entertaining spectacle."

== NBC television special ==
Bangerz Tour

Video by Miley Cyrus
- Released: March 23, 2015
- Recorded: June 13, 15 and 17, 2014
- Venues: Palau Sant Jordi (Barcelona); MEO Arena (Lisbon); Barclaycard Center (Madrid)
- Length: 88:00
- Label: RCA
- Directors: Diane Martel; Russell Thomas

Miley Cyrus chronology
Miley Cyrus: Live from London (2010)	Bangerz Tour (2015)

During her performance in Barcelona, Spain, Cyrus announced that footage from the concert was being filmed for a special to be broadcast by NBC. Officially announced by Cyrus and NBC on June 26, 2014, and premiering on July 6, 2014, the two-hour special featured performances from her tour stops in Barcelona and Lisbon, Portugal, along with behind-the-scenes content focusing on aspects of the tour and her personal life. Regarding the decision to broadcast the special, NBC alternative programming president, Paul Telgedy stated that it was to "offer an exclusive peek on how Cyrus engages with her crew and fans."

The special scored extremely low ratings; with 2 million viewers and a 0.7 share of the 18-49 demographic, Miley Cyrus: Bangerz Tour was the lowest-rated program of the night, and was beaten by new episodes of Reckless and Unforgettable on CBS, as well as a new episode of Rising Star on ABC; reruns aired over the Independence Day weekend by CBS, ABC, and Fox also contributed to the extremely low ratings. According to reports, the date chosen for the special's broadcast was not ideal, as Americans would not be watching television during the holiday weekend. However, it left a large impact on social networks, becoming a trending topic worldwide at various times of the night on Twitter. In August 2014, the Federal Communications Commission began to investigate three formal complaints surrounding the special, which argued that the special contained material inappropriate for broadcast television.

=== Bangerz Tour DVD ===
The NBC television special was released on DVD and Blu-ray on March 23, 2015, by RCA Records.

Chart (2015)	Peak position
Australian Music DVD (ARIA)	1
Brazilian Music DVD (ABPD)	1
Italian Music DVD (FIMI)	1
Spanish Music DVD (PROMUSICAE)	1
UK Music Video DVD (OCC)	2
US Music Video DVD (Billboard)	1

== Dominican Republic concert cancellation controversy ==
On August 21, 2014, the Dominican Republic government commission that oversees public performances banned a September 13 concert in Santo Domingo on morality grounds. The commission said in a statement that it took the action because Cyrus often "undertakes acts that go against morals and customs, which are punishable by Dominican law." Daniel Papalia of Forbes commented that the "country's ruling may contradict this 'Diplomacy in Action' piece published by the US Bureau of Democracy, Human Rights, and Labor. The study states that as of 2008 there were no government restrictions on 'academic freedom or cultural events' in Dominican Republic, the terms academic and cultural leaving ample room for interpretation."

== Set list ==
This set list is representative of the performance in Vancouver. It is not representative of all concerts for the duration of the tour.

1. "SMS (Bangerz)"
2. "4x4"
3. "Love Money Party"
4. "My Darlin'"
5. "Maybe You're Right"
6. "FU"
7. "Do My Thang"
8. "GetItRight"
9. "Can't Be Tamed"
10. "Adore You"
11. "Drive"
12. "Rooting for My Baby"
13. "Hey Ya!"
14. "Jolene"
15. "23"
16. "On My Own"
17. "Someone Else"
18. "We Can't Stop"
19. "Wrecking Ball"
20. "Party in the U.S.A."

=== Notes ===
- During the second North American leg, "Lucy in the Sky with Diamonds" replaced "23" at select concerts.
- During the performance in Oakland, Cyrus performed "Landslide" and "Yoshimi Battles the Pink Robots".
- During the performance in Phoenix, Cyrus performed "You're Gonna Make Me Lonesome When You Go".
- During the performance in Las Vegas and London, Cyrus performed covers of "Summertime Sadness" by Lana Del Rey, "Why'd You Only Call Me When You're High?" by Arctic Monkeys, and "Ruler of My Heart" by Linda Ronstadt.
- During the performance in Rosemont, Cyrus performed "It Ain't Me Babe".
- During the performance in Tulsa, Cyrus performed "The Scientist".
- During the performance in Houston, Cyrus performed "Love Is Like a Butterfly".
- During the performance in Helsinki, Finland, Cyrus performed a cover of "Wild Horses" by The Rolling Stones.
- During the performance in Antwerp, Belgium and Amsterdam, the Netherlands, Cyrus performed a cover of "In the Morning of the Magicians" by The Flaming Lips with her brother Braison Cyrus.
- During the performance in Uniondale, Cyrus performed "There Is a Light That Never Goes Out".
- During the performance in Philadelphia, Cyrus performed "There Is a Light That Never Goes Out" and "The Scientist".

== Tour dates ==
List of concerts
Date (2014)	City	Country	Venue	Attendance	Revenue
February 14	Vancouver	Canada	Rogers Arena		
February 16	Tacoma	United States	Tacoma Dome		
February 20	Anaheim	United States	Honda Center		
February 22	Los Angeles	United States	Staples Center	15,440 / 15,440	$1,180,766
February 24	Oakland	United States	Oracle Arena	—N/a	—N/a
February 25	San Jose	United States	SAP Center	—N/a	—N/a
February 27	Phoenix	United States	US Airways Center	—N/a	—N/a
March 1	Las Vegas	United States	MGM Grand Garden Arena	—N/a	—N/a
March 4	Denver	United States	Pepsi Center	—N/a	—N/a
March 6	Omaha	United States	CenturyLink Center Omaha	—N/a	—N/a
March 7	Rosemont	United States	Allstate Arena	—N/a	—N/a
March 9	Milwaukee	United States	BMO Harris Bradley Center	—N/a	—N/a
March 10	Saint Paul	United States	Xcel Energy Center	—N/a	—N/a
March 12	Dallas	United States	American Airlines Center	14,136 / 14,136	$911,689
March 13	Tulsa	United States	BOK Center	—N/a	—N/a
March 15	San Antonio	United States	AT&T Center	—N/a	—N/a
March 16	Houston	United States	Toyota Center	—N/a	—N/a
March 18	New Orleans	United States	New Orleans Arena	—N/a	—N/a
March 20	Tampa	United States	Tampa Bay Times Forum	—N/a	—N/a
March 22	Miami	United States	American Airlines Arena	—N/a	—N/a
March 24	Orlando	United States	Amway Center	10,821 / 12,434	$899,649
March 25	Atlanta	United States	Philips Arena	—N/a	—N/a
March 29	Montreal	Canada	Bell Centre	15,100 / 15,100	$1,115,660
March 31	Toronto	Canada	Air Canada Centre	16,623 / 16,623	$1,202,660
April 2	Boston	United States	TD Garden	—N/a	—N/a
April 3	East Rutherford	United States	Izod Center	—N/a	—N/a
April 5	New York City	United States	Barclays Center	—N/a	—N/a
April 8	Raleigh	United States	PNC Arena	—N/a	—N/a
April 10	Washington, D.C.	United States	Verizon Center	—N/a	—N/a
April 12	Auburn Hills	United States	The Palace of Auburn Hills	15,637 / 15,637	$1,011,923
April 13	Columbus	United States	Schottenstein Center	—N/a	—N/a
May 6	London	England	The O_{2} Arena	12,806 / 16,088	$1,221,720
May 10	Leeds	England	First Direct Arena	—N/a	—N/a
May 12	Glasgow	Scotland	SSE Hydro	—N/a	—N/a
May 14	Manchester	England	Phones 4u Arena	8,658 / 10,371	$795,424
May 16	Birmingham	England	National Indoor Arena	—N/a	—N/a
May 19	Belfast	Northern Ireland	Odyssey Arena	5,703 / 7,000	$543,706
May 20	Dublin	Ireland	O_{2} Dublin	7,362 / 8,477	$686,532
May 23	Montpellier	France	Park&Suites Arena	—N/a	—N/a
May 24	Lyon	France	Halle Tony Garnier	—N/a	—N/a
May 26	Cologne	Germany	Lanxess Arena	—N/a	—N/a
May 28	Oslo	Norway	Telenor Arena	21,120 / 21,120	—N/a
May 30	Stockholm	Sweden	Ericsson Globe	—N/a	—N/a
June 1	Helsinki	Finland	Hartwall Arena	—N/a	—N/a
June 4	Copenhagen	Denmark	Forum Copenhagen	—N/a	—N/a
June 6	Frankfurt	Germany	Festhalle Frankfurt	—N/a	—N/a
June 7	Zürich	Switzerland	Hallenstadion	12,628 / 13,000	$1,230,050
June 8	Milan	Italy	Mediolanum Forum	11,858 / 11,858	$1,122,304
June 10	Vienna	Austria	Wiener Stadthalle	—N/a	—N/a
June 13	Barcelona	Spain	Palau Sant Jordi	17,512 / 17,512	$1,461,807
June 15	Lisbon	Portugal	MEO Arena	15,620 / 15,620	$1,902,589
June 17	Madrid	Spain	Barclaycard Center	11,540 / 11,540	$940,823
June 20 (Note: The June 20, 2014 show at Sportpaleis in Antwerp was originally scheduled to take place on May 4, 2014, but was rescheduled due to Cyrus recovering from a severe allergic reaction.)	Antwerp	Belgium	Sportpaleis	16,740 / 18,936	$1,187,240
June 22 (Note: The June 22, 2014 show at the Ziggo Dome in Amsterdam was originally scheduled to take place on May 2, 2014, but was rescheduled due to Cyrus recovering from a severe allergic reaction.)	Amsterdam	Netherlands	Ziggo Dome	12,617 / 14,088	$856,860
August 1 (Note: The August 1, 2014 show at the Nassau Coliseum in Uniondale was originally scheduled to take place on April 24, 2014, but was rescheduled due to Cyrus recovering from a severe allergic reaction.)	Uniondale	United States	Nassau Coliseum	—N/a	—N/a
August 2 (Note: The August 2, 2014 show at the Wells Fargo Center in Philadelphia was originally scheduled to take place on April 22, 2014, but was rescheduled to April 21, 2014 due to the 2014 Stanley Cup playoffs. The show was later rescheduled to August 2 due to Cyrus recovering from a severe allergic reaction.)	Philadelphia	United States	Wells Fargo Center	—N/a	—N/a
August 4	Pittsburgh	United States	Consol Energy Center	—N/a	—N/a
August 6 (Note: The August 6, 2014 show at the Time Warner Cable Arena in Charlotte was originally scheduled to take place on April 7, 2014, but was cancelled due to Cyrus having the flu. The show was later rescheduled.)	Charlotte	United States	Time Warner Cable Arena	13,734 / 13,734	$897,314
August 7 (Note: The August 7, 2014 show at the Bridgestone Arena in Nashville was originally scheduled to take place on April 18, but was rescheduled due to Cyrus being hospitalized for a severe allergic reaction.)	Nashville	United States	Bridgestone Arena	—N/a	—N/a
August 9 (Note: The August 9, 2014 show at the KFC Yum! Center in Louisville was originally scheduled to take place on April 19, 2014, but was rescheduled due to Cyrus being hospitalized for a severe allergic reaction.)	Louisville	United States	KFC Yum! Center	—N/a	—N/a
August 10 (Note: The August 10, 2014 show at the Scottrade Center in St. Louis was originally scheduled to take place on April 16, 2014, but was cancelled due to Cyrus being hospitalized for a severe allergic reaction. The show was later rescheduled.)	St. Louis	United States	Scottrade Center	—N/a	—N/a
August 12 (Note: The August 12, 2014 show at the Sprint Center in Kansas City was originally scheduled to take place on April 15, 2014, but was cancelled due to Cyrus being hospitalized for a severe allergic reaction. The show was later rescheduled.)	Kansas City	United States	Sprint Center	—N/a	—N/a
August 14	Chicago	United States	United Center	—N/a	—N/a
September 11	San Juan	Puerto Rico	Coliseo de Puerto Rico	6,411 / 6,411	$458,793
September 16	Monterrey	Mexico	Arena Monterrey	—N/a	—N/a
September 17	Monterrey	Mexico	Arena Monterrey	—N/a	—N/a
September 19 (Note: The September 18, 2014 show in Mexico City was rescheduled for the following day, the 19th, by logistic problems.)	Mexico City	Mexico	Mexico City Arena	—N/a	—N/a
September 21	Zapopan	Mexico	Telmex Auditorium	—N/a	—N/a
September 26	São Paulo	Brazil	Arena Anhembi	13,229 / 32,528	$1,516,560
September 28	Rio de Janeiro	Brazil	Praça da Apoteose	18,712 / 31,543	$1,043,660
October 1	Santiago	Chile	Movistar Arena	—N/a	—N/a
October 3	Buenos Aires	Argentina	Estadio G.E.B.A.	18,000 / 18,000	$2,000,000
October 8	Auckland	New Zealand	Vector Arena	11,833 / 11,833	$1,226,230
October 10	Melbourne	Australia	Rod Laver Arena	12,472 / 12,472	$1,356,320
October 15	Brisbane	Australia	Brisbane Entertainment Centre	11,059 / 11,578	$1,082,370
October 17	Sydney	Australia	Allphones Arena	15,308 / 15,635	$1,510,970
October 20	Adelaide	Australia	Entertainment Centre Arena	7,264 / 8,311	$603,030
October 23	Perth	Australia	Perth Arena	12,554 / 12,822	$1,021,350

List of cancelled shows
Date (2014)	City	Country	Venue	Reason
April 25	Mashantucket	United States	MGM Grand Theater	Medical issues
September 13	Santo Domingo	Dominican Republic	Estadio Quisqueya	Banned by government
September 24	Brasília	Brazil	Nilson Nelson Gymnasium	Logistical issues
