= Bangerz =

2013 studio album by Miley Cyrus

- Standard edition cover (Note: The five deluxe edition covers feature different images of Cyrus, and the 10th anniversary vinyl cover features a black background with white font.)

Studio album by Miley Cyrus
- Released: October 4, 2013
- Recorded: 2013
- Studios: Glenwood; Glenwood Place (Burbank); NightBird (West Hollywood); Conway; Westlake (Los Angeles); Circle House (Miami); South Beach (Miami Beach); Record Plant; Chalice (Hollywood); MilkBoy (Philadelphia)
- Genres: Pop; R&B; trap-pop
- Length: 50:30
- Label: RCA
- Producers: Mike Will Made It; Oren Yoel; Rami Samir Afuni; Dr. Luke; Cirkut; Michael McHenry; Pharrell Williams; Kyle Edwards

Miley Cyrus chronology
| Hannah Montana Forever (2010) | Bangerz (2013) | Miley Cyrus & Her Dead Petz (2015) |

Singles from Bangerz
- 1. "We Can't Stop" Released: June 3, 2013; 2. "Wrecking Ball" Released: August 25, 2013; 3. "Adore You" Released: December 17, 2013

Bangerz is the fourth studio album by the American singer Miley Cyrus. It was released on October 4, 2013. It was her first body of original work since leaving Hollywood Records after the release of her third studio album Can't Be Tamed (2010) and her signing to RCA in early 2013. Cyrus began to work on the album, and she decided against prioritizing her acting career as originally stated, in 2012. Primarily a pop and R&B record with lyrical themes that revolve largely around romance, Bangerz is a shift in both genre and tone from her previous work, which she began to feel "disconnected" from. Pop singer Britney Spears and rappers Big Sean, French Montana, Future, Ludacris, and Nelly are featured on the record.

Bangerz originally received generally positive reviews from music critics, who were divided on Cyrus' provocative image but praised its production and originality. In retrospect, the album has received acclaim for its influence on pop culture. It became Cyrus' fifth number-one album on the US Billboard 200, and it debuted with the third-highest opening week for a female artist in 2013. The album has since been certified triple-platinum by the Recording Industry Association of America (RIAA). It was also nominated for the Best Pop Vocal Album at the 57th Annual Grammy Awards, which marked Cyrus' first career Grammy nomination.

The album was supported by the singles "We Can't Stop", "Wrecking Ball", and "Adore You". "We Can't Stop" peaked at number two on the US Billboard Hot 100, and "Wrecking Ball" became Cyrus' first number-one single in the United States. Both singles' music videos became the fastest videos to reach 100 million views on Vevo, and the latter won the award for Video of the Year at the 2014 MTV Video Music Awards. Cyrus further promoted the album with the Bangerz Tour in 2014.

Bangerz and its promotional efforts are lauded as a turning point in Cyrus' career, in which her public image successfully evolved from being a child star who was synonymous with her former television series Hannah Montana, to being a musical artist in her own right. Cyrus' controversial and sexually charged behavior during this time period resulted in various defining moments in pop culture, including her polarizing performance at the 2013 MTV Video Music Awards, and the release of the controversial music video for the single "Wrecking Ball".

== Background and production ==
"Right now, when people go to iTunes and listen to my old music, it's so irritating to me because I can't just erase that stuff and start over. My last record I feel so disconnected from – I was 16 or 17 when I made it. When you're in your 20s, you just don't really know that person anymore."

— Cyrus describing the artistic transition she experienced during the production of Bangerz.

In 2010, Cyrus announced plans to focus on her film career, effectively putting her musical endeavors on a hiatus. In 2012, she appeared in the films LOL and So Undercover. She was also confirmed as a primary voice actress in the feature film Hotel Transylvania, but was fired from the project due to a scandal involving her licking a suggestive cake. This fallout ended up serving her well to coordinate a musical comeback. In January 2013, Cyrus signed a recording contract with RCA Records. In March, she confirmed that her fourth studio album would be released by the end of 2013. Cyrus stated that she "started over" as an artist after terminating the services of her previous professional connections, who she felt "would have [been] scared" by her evolving public image. In a later interview, she elaborated that she recognizes Bangerz to be her official debut record, deprecating her earlier projects released during the production of Hannah Montana. While recording the then-untitled album, Cyrus intended to produce a "very adult and sexy and believable" final product, and was "having fun making music [for] the first time in her career." She said the album was influenced by Motown Sound. Musical acts which inspired the album included OneRepublic and Timbaland. According to Cyrus, Bangerz cost "a couple million" dollars to produce.

She described the music as "dirty south hip-hop" and combining the genres of hip-hop and country, which she felt was a "good hybrid". To achieve this sound, Cyrus worked with various hip hop producers including Mike Will Made It, Mac Miller, Pharrell Williams, and Tyler, the Creator in cities including Atlanta, Georgia. They helped her to incorporate hip hop music elements into the project, which Cyrus acknowledged resulted in a "really different sound". Cyrus further commented that her project would "shut everyone up", and later compared the record to Bad (1987) by Michael Jackson, in that "people still are listening to [it] because it's so fucking dope" and "[wants] people to listen to [her] album like that." She also expressed her desire to "set a new standard for pop music". Producer Sean Garrett called the record "fun [and] exciting", and stated that a collaboration that Cyrus recorded with Britney Spears would appear on the final track listing. Mike Will Made It explained that the title for the album was decided upon after realizing that "whole album was bangers".

== Release and artwork ==
External images
- Four of the five deluxe version covers for Bangerz, found on CD pressings at several music retailers.
- The fifth deluxe version cover for Bangerz, found on CD and vinyl pressings sold exclusively through Cyrus' website.

On August 6, 2013, after reaching 13 million followers on Twitter, Cyrus tweeted that the record would be titled Bangerz. Its cover sleeve and images were shot by British photographer Tyrone Lebon. On August 24, 2013, Cyrus unveiled the album artworks for the standard and deluxe versions of the album; both depict a blonde Cyrus wearing a short black coat with the title "Bangerz" stylized in fluorescent neon lighting in front of palm trees. It was described as being reminiscent of the 1980s television series Miami Vice and an unexpected choice given her recent influence by hip hop culture. Later on August 25, Bangerz was made available for pre-order through the iTunes Store. She later confirmed that it would be released on October 4, 2013, in the United States. After her music video for the track "Wrecking Ball" broke the Vevo record for the most views in the first twenty-four hours of its release, Cyrus revealed the track listing for Bangerz through Twitter on September 10.

On September 18, 2013, Cyrus unveiled four additional covers for the physical version of the deluxe record, which were sporadically distributed across international retailers and voted on by fans to determine the official cover to be printed for future pressings. Two of the covers display Cyrus dressed in alternate outfits, one with a black jacket and another with a white bra and checkered black pants. The third version depicts a close-up of Cyrus surrounded by roses, while the fourth version highlights a topless Cyrus covering her chest. The topless cover is featured for an online-exclusive edition of the record and is also the primary visual for the vinyl pressings, released on November 26 through Cyrus' online store. It was compared to her music video for "Wrecking Ball", which also showcased an unclothed Cyrus, while the others were deemed conservative by comparison. On October 15, it was announced through Cyrus' Facebook profile that the original deluxe artwork would remain the official cover. The record is additionally marked with the Parental Advisory label, affixed by the Recording Industry Association of America (RIAA) to identify explicit content. On September 29, 30-second snippets of each track on Bangerz were made available through AllMusic. On April 22, 2017, the album was rereleased on vinyl for Record Store Day. A 10th anniversary edition was released on September 29, 2023. Two editions were made available, one featuring two black LPs and the other one two seaglass colored LPs, both featuring '23' as a bonus track.

== Composition ==
=== Music and lyrics ===
Bangerz is primarily a pop, R&B, and trap-pop record, which also integrates elements of hip-hop, synth-pop and country music. During an interview on The Ellen DeGeneres Show on October 10, host Ellen DeGeneres asked Cyrus if the record was inspired by her relationship with Liam Hemsworth, to which she replied "the whole album is a story of that and I think it says that starting with "Adore You" and ending with "Someone Else" ..... I think I knew more intuitively where my life was going than I actually thought I did at the time."

=== Songs and lyrical content ===
The record opens with "Adore You", a pop and R&B ballad, which lyrically addresses a lover through lyrics including "We were meant to be/In holy matrimony". Nick Catucci from Entertainment Weekly opined that the track allowed Cyrus to showcase her vocal abilities. "We Can't Stop" is a midtempo pop, and R&B with influences from EDM and hip hop song that lyrically discusses the events of a house party. Mikael Wood of the Los Angeles Times calling the song "the calmest, most clear-eyed rebel yell since Janet Jackson's 'Control'." Catucci described "SMS (Bangerz)" as a "merry rap-off" with pop singer Britney Spears, who appears as a guest vocalist in the second verse. "4x4" features hip hop recording artist Nelly, and lyrically discusses the story of a "female rebel" looking to find bail for her romantic partner. Country music elements are present throughout the song. "My Darlin'" features Future; Cyrus' vocal abilities were complimented, though were deemed to be overpowered by a "sea of blinking synths and unthawed crooning". "Wrecking Ball" is a synthpop ballad speaking of a failed relationship.

The seventh track "Love Money Party" features Big Sean, and incorporates a "grimy, haunted-house beat". Jason Lipshutz from Billboard noted that Cyrus appeared more comfortable with rapping in the recording, compared to an earlier performance on the Mike Will Made It single "23". "#GetItRight" is a "stylish breeze" that sees the inclusion of "whistling [...] and a chopped guitar lick". It was described as being reminiscent of "Twisted" by Usher and "Kickin' In" by Adam Lambert, all three of which were produced by Pharrell Williams. Cyrus stated that "Drive" was inspired by "needing to leave someone but not really wanting to completely cut yourself off from the relationship." The track was described as "a sad-Kanye-esque track" and her comments were assumed to reference her engagement to Hemsworth by the media. The tenth track "FU" features French Montana, and according to Catucci, blends "starry Adele-style sass and a French Montana verse into expertly inlaid dubstep wub-wubs". He went on to describe "Do My Thang" as a "ripping dance track", while Lipshutz recognized influences from "gooey synthesizers and snapping percussion". "Maybe You're Right" incorporates drum instrumentation with "hints of gospel influence", and was also questioned to be addressing Hemsworth. The thirteenth and final track "Someone Else" combines hip hop and synthpop styles, and lyrically discusses Cyrus' evolving public image.

== Promotion ==
=== Singles ===
"We Can't Stop"
A sample of "We Can't Stop" by Miley Cyrus, serviced as the lead single from Bangerz. Musically, the track marks a departure from her earlier recordings, and incorporates pop, R&B, and dance elements.

"Wrecking Ball"
A sample of "Wrecking Ball" by Miley Cyrus, serviced as the second single from Bangerz. It strays from the styles displayed in its predecessor, instead focusing on synthpop styles.

"We Can't Stop" was released as the lead single from Bangerz on June 3, 2013. It received generally mixed reviews from music critics, who were ambivalent towards its production and lyrics. The song peaked at number 2 on the US Billboard Hot 100, tying it with "Party in the U.S.A." as Cyrus' highest-peaking single in the country at the time. Internationally, it enjoyed varying success across Europe and Oceania, and peaked at number one in New Zealand. The accompanying music video was released on June 19, 2013, and was noted for depicting an increasingly provocative Cyrus, an effort begun with her third record Can't Be Tamed (2010). With 10.7 million views in its first day, the clip briefly held the Vevo record for the most views in 24 hours, before being surpassed by "Best Song Ever" by One Direction. It was also the fastest video to reach 100 million views, having done so in 37 days.

"Wrecking Ball" was released as the album's second single on August 25, 2013. The song peaked atop the Billboard Hot 100, becoming Cyrus' first single to do so in the United States. It additionally peaked within the top-twenty of several international singles charts, and reached at number 2 in Australia and New Zealand. The accompanying music video was released on September 9, 2013, and garnered significant media attention for showcasing a nude Cyrus. With 19.3 million views, it broke the Vevo record for the most views in 24 hours, and additionally became the fastest video to reach 100 million views, having done so in 6 days. The first-day viewing record was later surpassed by the visuals for "Anaconda" by Nicki Minaj in August 2014, which received 19.6 million views, upon its premiere. On December 4, 2013, "Wrecking Ball" returned to the peak position of the Billboard Hot 100 with assistance from online streaming of a viral Chatroulette parody video, and consequently became the largest gap between number-one sittings in Billboard history. On the same month, the music videos for "Wrecking Ball" and "We Can't Stop" were announced as the first and second most-viewed videos on Vevo in 2013, respectively.

"Adore You" was released as the third and final single from Bangerz; it was serviced to contemporary hit radio stations on December 17, 2013. It received generally favorable reviews, with critics appreciating its mid-tempo production, although they criticized the use of Auto-Tune in its vocals. The accompanying music video was leaked on the evening of December 25, and was officially premiered on the morning of December 26. The clip depicts Cyrus suggestively posing in a bed and a bathtub, and is interspersed with night vision footage that appears to simulate a sex tape. It reached at number 21 on the Billboard Hot 100. The remix for "Adore You", was officially released on Beatport through his label Spinnin' Records on March 3.

=== Performances ===
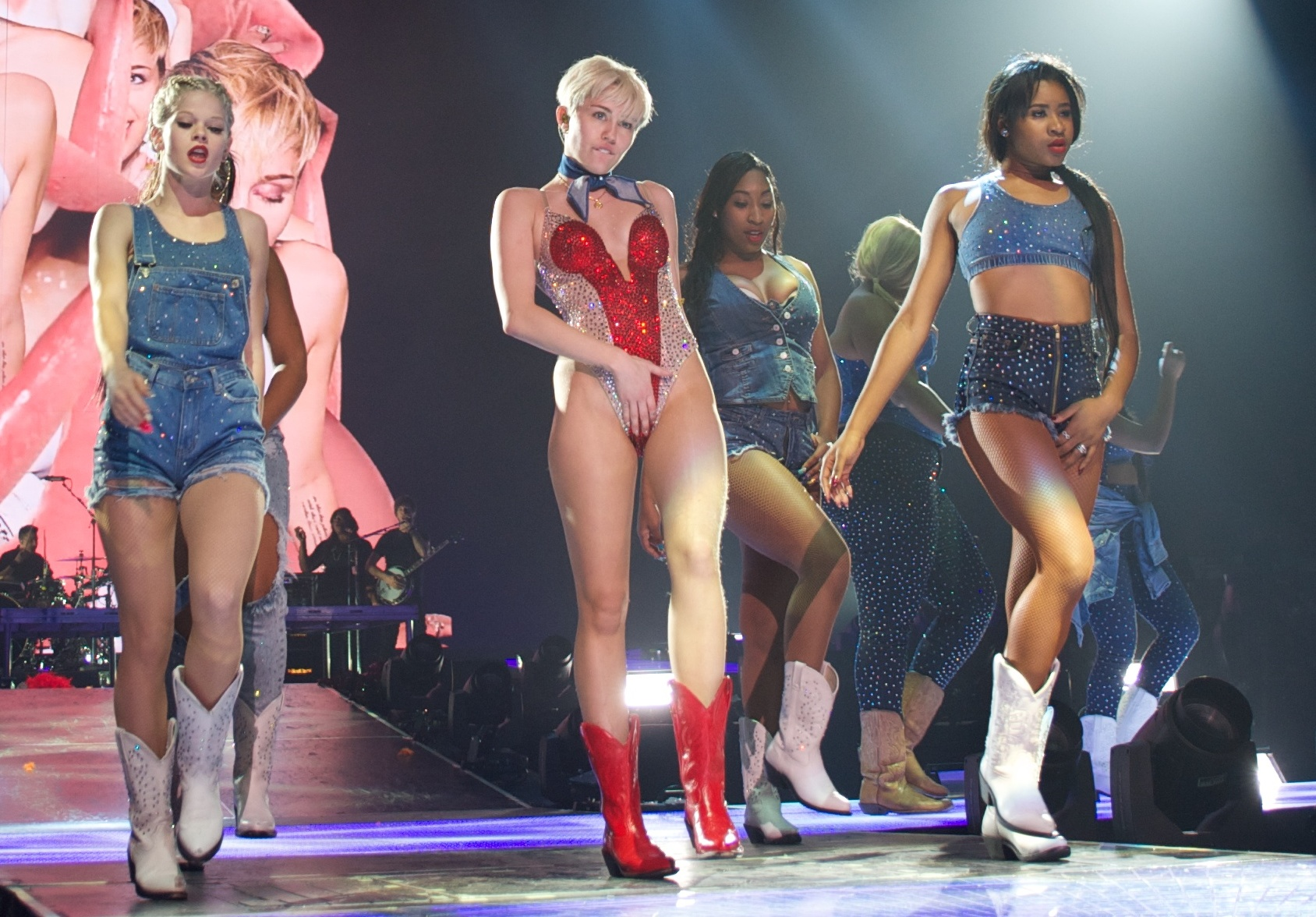
Cyrus performing on the Bangerz Tour, February 2014

Cyrus first performed "We Can't Stop" on Jimmy Kimmel Live! on June 26, 2013, and on Good Morning America the following day. In August 2013, she became the subject of widespread media attention and public scrutiny following a controversial performance and duet with Robin Thicke at the 2013 MTV Video Music Awards at Barclays Center in New York City. The performance began with Cyrus performing "We Can't Stop" in bear-themed attire. Halfway through the act, Cyrus stripped down to a skin-colored two-piece outfit as Thicke joined her on stage to perform "Blurred Lines". Cyrus subsequently touched Thicke's crotch area with a giant foam finger and twerked against his crotch. An article published in The Hollywood Reporter described the performance as "crass" and "reminiscent of a bad acid trip". Media attention of the performance largely overshadowed the attention that was given to other major events of the night, such as the reunion of NSYNC and performances by Lady Gaga and Katy Perry. The performance was described by XXL critic B. J. Steiner as a "trainwreck in the classic sense of the word as the audience reaction seemed to be a mix of confusion, dismay and horror in a cocktail of embarrassment", while the BBC said Cyrus stole the show with a "raunchy performance". The performance generated 306,100 tweets per minute on Twitter, breaking the record for the most tweeted-about event in the history of the social network; the previous record, held by the Super Bowl XLVII halftime show featuring Beyoncé, generated 268,000 tweets per minute. According to Forbes, Cyrus' performance resulted in a gain of over 213,000 Twitter followers, 226,000 likes on Facebook, and 90,000 downloads of her new promotional single, "Wrecking Ball", within days of the controversial performance. This amounted to a total 112% increase in Cyrus' social media activity.

In September 2013, Cyrus sang "We Can't Stop" on Schlag den Raab in Germany (September 7), Le Grand Journal in France (September 9), and Alan Carr: Chatty Man in England (September 13). On September 21, she performed twice at iHeartRadio Music Festival in Las Vegas, in the afternoon at festival village and in the evening at MGM Grand Garden Arena. During both shows she sang "We Can't Stop" and, for the first time, "Wrecking Ball". Despite generating media attention for a provocative wardrobe, the performance was considered to be "fairly tame considering the VMAs." On October 5, Cyrus served as the host and musical guest during an episode of Saturday Night Live. She appeared in several sketches, including a parody of "We Can't Stop" titled "We Did Stop (The Government)", referencing the federal government shutdown, and performed an acoustic version of "We Can't Stop" and "Wrecking Ball". The following Monday, Cyrus performed both singles on Today as part of their Toyota Concert Series. She held an album signing on October 8 at Planet Hollywood in Times Square, and also appeared on Late Night with Jimmy Fallon and The Ellen DeGeneres Show later that month, also singing both singles there.

Bangerz was additionally promoted through the documentary Miley: The Movement, which premiered through MTV on October 2; it covered the production of the project and the lead-up to its release. In November, Cyrus traveled to Europe again to sing both "We Can't Stop" and "Wrecking Ball" at the 2013 MTV Europe Music Awards in Amsterdam on November 10; she garnered media attention for smoking a joint of marijuana on-stage while accepting the Best Video Award for the latter single. During her trip, she also performed "Wrecking Ball" on Wetten, dass..? in Germany (November 9), BBC Radio 1's Live Lounge in London (November 12), and the 2013 Bambi Awards in Germany (November 14). On November 17, she performed "Wrecking Ball" on The X Factor in London. After being criticized for delivering a lackluster vocal performance, Cyrus was placed under "vocal rest" by her doctors in preparation of the Bangerz Tour. On November 24, Cyrus performed "Wrecking Ball" at the 2013 American Music Awards; a digitally animated cat projected on the screen behind her lip-synced the lyrics alongside Cyrus. In December, she performed at Jingle Ball concerts in Los Angeles (KIIS-FM Jingle Ball), Saint Paul, Atlanta, New York City, Washington, D.C., Tampa and Sunrise. She was expected to perform in Boston during the series, although her flight from New York City was cancelled due to Winter Storm Electra and was therefore unable to attend.

Cyrus also performed "#GetItRight" and "Wrecking Ball" on Dick Clark's New Year's Rockin' Eve with Ryan Seacrest in Times Square on December 31; she had previously been expected to perform at the Fontainebleau Miami Beach with Pharrell Williams. On January 25, 2014, Cyrus sang "#GetItRight" during Clive Davis' party the evening before the 56th Annual Grammy Awards; after an unenthusiastic response from the audience, she performed a cover version of "Jolene" by Dolly Parton which received a more favorable reception. An episode of MTV Unplugged starring Cyrus premiered through MTV on January 29. She performed acoustic versions of "Adore You", "SMS (Bangerz)", "4x4", "Wrecking Ball", "#GetItRight", "Drive", "Do My Thang", and "Rooting for My Baby". Cyrus also performed a cover version of "Jolene", while Madonna appeared as a surprise guest that evening to sing a medley of Cyrus "We Can't Stop" and her own "Don't Tell Me". An uncensored version of the special was released online on February 6, and included an additional cover version of "Why'd You Only Call Me When You're High?" by the Arctic Monkeys. Cyrus performed "Wrecking Ball" during the 2014 World Music Awards in Monte-Carlo on May 27. Cyrus participated in the Summertime Ball at Wembley Stadium in London on June 21, where she sang "SMS (Bangerz)", "4x4", "Love Money Party", "Wrecking Ball", "We Can't Stop" and "Party in the U.S.A.".

=== Tour ===
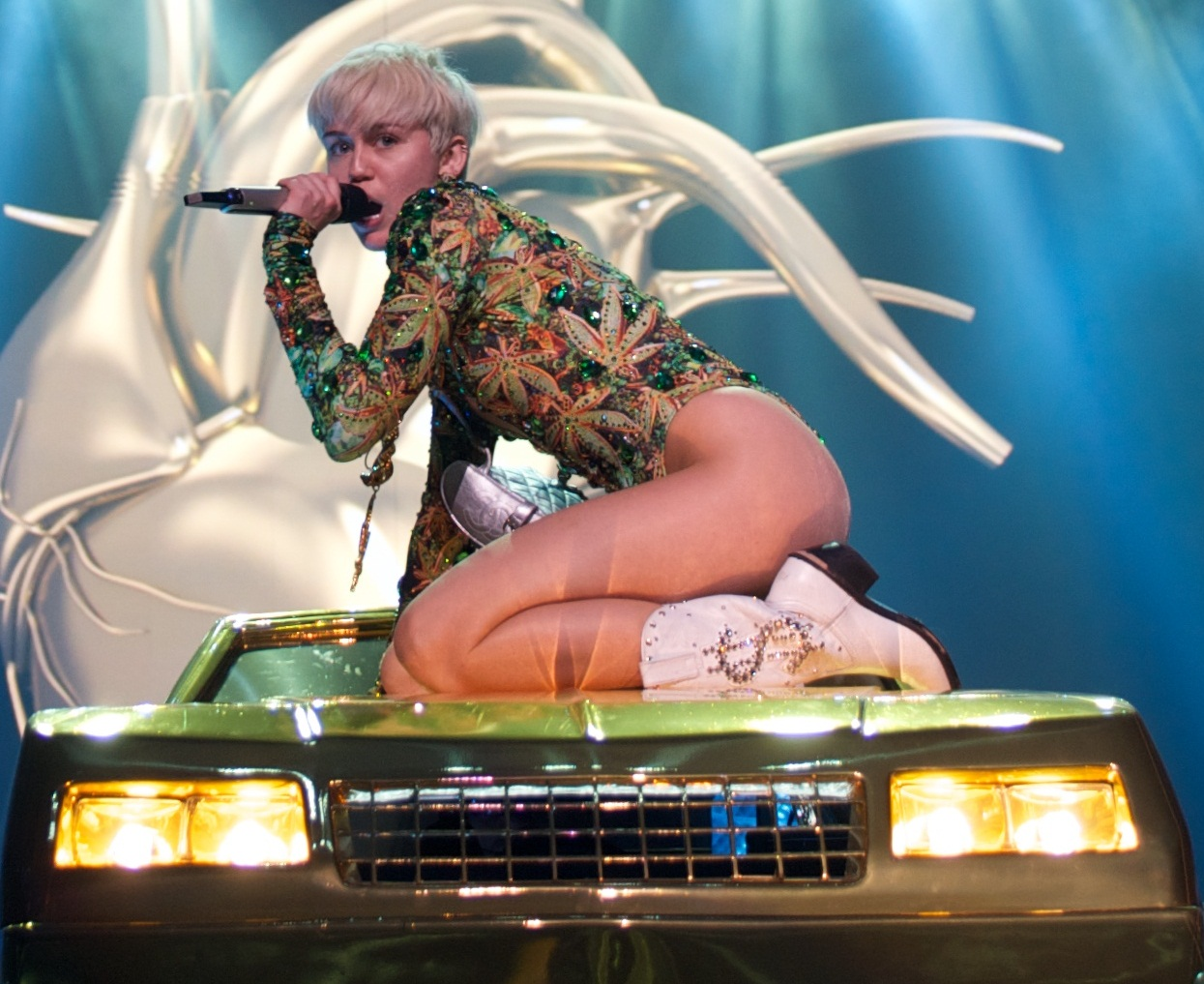
Cyrus performing on the Bangerz Tour, February 2014

During her appearance on Today on October 7, Cyrus first mentioned her intentions to tour in 2014. On October 26, she made a surprise appearance on another episode of Saturday Night Live to officially announce the Bangerz Tour. It was promoted by the American entertainment company Live Nation Entertainment, which was reported to be paying Cyrus $500,000 per presentation. The first leg of the tour visited North America and was originally scheduled to include thirty-eight shows, for which Swedish duo Icona Pop and American recording artist Sky Ferreira were announced as its opening acts.

Tickets for the North American leg became available for purchase on November 16; it began at the Rogers Arena in Vancouver on February 14, 2014, and was originally planned conclude on April 24 at the Nassau Veterans Memorial Coliseum in Uniondale, New York. However, several showings were postponed after Cyrus experienced an allergic reaction to medication on April 15. The rescheduled North American dates saw the inclusion of two additional performances; they began on August 1 at the Nassau Veterans Memorial Coliseum in Uniondale, and concluded on August 14 at the United Center in Chicago. The second leg of the tour visited Europe and included eighteen shows, for which tickets became available for purchase on December 13. It began on May 6 at The O2 Arena in London, and concluded on June 22 at the Ziggo Dome in Amsterdam. The two-hour television special Miley Cyrus: Bangerz Tour was filmed during Cyrus' performances in Spain and Portugal, and was broadcast on July 6 on NBC in the United States. The tour resumed on August 1 at Nassau Coliseum in Uniondale and concluded on October 23 at the Perth Arena in Perth, Australia.

== Critical reception ==
Professional ratings
Aggregate scores
| Source | Rating |
|---|---|
| AnyDecentMusic? | 5.5/10 |
| Metacritic | 61/100 |
Review scores
| Source | Rating |
| AllMusic | 3.5/5 stars |
| The A.V. Club | B |
| Entertainment Weekly | A− |
| The Guardian | 3/5 stars |
| Los Angeles Times | 3/4 stars |
| The Observer | 2.0/5 stars |
| PopMatters | 4/10 |
| Rolling Stone | 3.5/5 stars |
| Slant Magazine | 3.5/5 stars |
| Spin | 4/10 |

Bangerz received mixed reviews from music critics. At Metacritic, which assigns a normalized rating out of 100 to reviews from mainstream critics, the album received an average score of 61, which indicates "generally favorable reviews", based on 21 reviews. Writing for AllMusic, Heather Phares provided a favorable review, opining that it "accomplishes [the] mission" of "[selling] Cyrus as an independent woman", further commenting that the incorporation of several genres within the project "introduces Miley as an A-list pop star." Jason Lipshutz of Billboard complimented the album for being "fiercely individual", but stated that the "dramatic breakup songs" became repetitive. Lipshutz stated that the album is "neither the best nor worst pop album" released in 2013, and stated power ballad songs like "Wrecking Ball" would increase her career longevity. Nick Catucci of Entertainment Weekly described Bangerz as being "utterly fresh" and a "pop blitz from a hip hop blue print", and stated that Cyrus had visibly transitioned from her former persona established by the Disney Channel.

"I still really can't stand the way people keep pinning Miley's cribbing from a wide variety of other cultures and styles as somehow evil. And, it's not just hip-hop on this album, but country, EDM, vampy balladry, and more. This is basically what white girls in America do. Why? Because there is essentially no culture for white women in America beyond sex, daughter/wife roles, and beauty, and for some of us, that is not enough."

— Caitlin White for Consequence of Sound

Mikael Wood from the Los Angeles Times noted that the album favored a "grittier, hip-hop-inspired vibe" instead of the "glossy electro-pop" from her previous material, and further opined that "We Can't Stop" "still astounds; it might be the calmest, most clear-eyed rebel yell since Janet Jackson's 'Control.' An album beyond its years." Rolling Stone's Jon Dolan complimented the album's "wide-ranging production", labeling it a "Rihanna-meets-Gaga-meets-Pink-meets-Britney party grenade of a record". Writing for Fact, Tom Lea provided a more mixed review of Bangerz, calling it a "hot mess of country, Southern hip-hop and more", but concluded that the record contained "more—ahem—bangers than clangers." Caroline Sullivan from The Guardian shared a similar sentiment, but also concluded that the overall record held "more hits than misses". John Murphy of MusicOMH described the tracks as being "rather run of the mill material", but nonetheless complimented Cyrus' promotional efforts for making the record "one of the most anticipated pop albums of the year". Caitlin White from Consequence of Sound praised the album saying that "though gawky and unwieldy, this is a portrait of a woman with fierce, interesting instincts".

Kitty Empire from The Observer was more negative of Bangerz, stating that the project "feels stitched together in the dark, and the attention-seeking begins to grate." Elysa Gardner for USA Today described the record's composition as "mediocre" and consisting of "competent, mostly generic tunes". Jessica Hopper from Spin was also more negative of the record, remarking that it is a "precise album that flits between bombastic and turgid" and "is very fun".

== Accolades ==
On his list of the ten best albums of 2013, Nick Catucci from Entertainment Weekly placed Bangerz third, complimenting Cyrus' ability for "cutting-edge rap [...], a soulful voice capable of showstoppers [...], and an underappreciated emotional directness". The Guardian ranked Bangerz thirty-fourth on their list of the forty best albums, commenting that it "[winds] people up for commercial, rather than transgressive, ends" despite initially commenting that "the attention-seeking begins to grate". Rolling Stone placed Bangerz at number twenty-seven on their list of the fifty best albums, writing that Cyrus "[brought] depth and vulnerability to one hell of a party [...] amid all the foam-finger hub-hub". Ann Powers from NPR ranked the record tenth on her list of ten records, suggesting that it "should earn her entry into every celebration of pop this year", while the Associated Press ranked it ninth for being "banging". Joey Guerra from Houston Chronicle listed Bangerz as the fourth-best record of the year, calling it a "fun, feisty pop album that produced two of the year's biggest, best singles" and summarizing that "with one flick of her tongue, Cyrus easily outdoes recent fare from Gaga, Katy and Britney." FACT Magazine ranked Bangerz forty-ninth on their list of the fifty best albums of 2013, stating that "in a year where few albums from pop music’s big names lived up to potential (step forward Gaga, Britney and Jay-Z), Miley Cyrus undoubtedly ruled the roost".

Billboard listed Bangerz at number ninety-one on their list of the 100 best albums of the 2010s pointing that "with this pivotal album release, Cyrus took control of her public persona, surprising less with her provocative antics than with her constant artistic evolution." Consequence of Sound ranked Bangerz twentieth on their list of the 25 best pop albums of the 2010s.

=== Awards ===
| Year | Organization | Award | Result |
|---|---|---|---|
| 2014 | People's Choice Awards | Favorite Album | Nominated |
| 2014 | World Music Awards | World's Best Album | Nominated |
| 2015 | Grammy Awards | Best Pop Vocal Album | Nominated |

=== Year-end lists ===
| Publication | List | Rank | Ref. |
|---|---|---|---|
| Amazon | Amazon's 100 Best Albums of 2013 | 18 | |
| Associated Press | Top 10 Albums of the Year | 9 | |
| Entertainment Weekly | 10 Best Albums of 2013 | 3 | |
| FACT Magazine | 50 Best Albums of 2013 | 49 | |
| The Guardian | Best Albums of 2013 | 34 | |
| Houston Chronicle | Best Albums of 2013 | 4 | |
| NPR | Ann Powers' Top 10 Albums of 2013 | 10 | |
| Rolling Stone | 50 Best Albums of 2013 | 27 | |
| Rolling Stone | Rob Sheffield's Top 20 Albums of 2013 | 4 | |

=== Decade-end lists ===
| Publication | List | Rank | Ref. |
|---|---|---|---|
| Billboard | Billboard's 100 Greatest Albums of the 2010s | 91 | |
| Consequence of Sound | Top 25 Pop Albums of the 2010s | 20 | |

== Commercial performance ==
Bangerz debuted at number one on the Billboard 200 dated October 16, 2013, with first-week sales of 270,000 copies, surpassing Can't Be Tamed by 168,000 copies. This earned Cyrus her fifth non-consecutive number-one album in the United States and became the best-selling debut week for a female artist in 2013 at that point, later passed by Katy Perry's Prism and Beyoncé's self-titled album. During its second week of release, Bangerz dropped to number two with sales of 72,000 copies, and dropped to number four in its third week after moving 53,000 units. As of February 2014, Bangerz has sold one million copies in the United States, and has been certified platinum by the Recording Industry Association of America (RIAA). On June 20, 2018, the album was certified 3× Platinum by the RIAA denoting 3 million album-equivalent units. It also debuted at number one on the Canadian Albums Chart, where it was eventually certified double platinum, and entered the Top 100 Mexico chart at number three.

Bangerz charted moderately throughout Europe. In the United Kingdom, the record and her track "Wrecking Ball" both debuted at number one on their respective charts in the same week, making Cyrus the first artist of 2013 to achieve a "chart double" in the country. The album was later recognized with a silver certification. It also reached the peak position in Ireland, Norway, and Scotland. Furthermore, it respectively debuted at numbers two and three in Spain and Italy. The album peaked at number four on the Ö3 Austria Top 40 and the Swedish Sverigetopplistan. It also debuted at number four on the Portuguese Albums Chart. The album also reached number six on the Dutch MegaCharts, number seven on the Swiss Music Charts, number eight on the Hungarian MAHASZ, and number three on the Danish Hitlisten and number nine on both the French Albums Chart and the German Media Control Charts. In Belgium, the record respectively peaked at numbers eight and nineteen in Flanders and Wallonia. The album reached number 23 on The Official Finnish Charts, and debuted at number 45 on the Polish ZPAV. In South America, Bangerz charted at number one on the Argentinian CAPIF chart and the Brazilian ABPD chart. The record experienced similar success in Oceania, where it debuted in the peak position of the Australian ARIA Charts and reached number two in New Zealand. In the latter country, it was certified gold.

== Legacy ==
"This doesn't mean that this personality can't change again. One need only look at the many faces of Christina Aguilera through her formative years or Madonna, for that matter, to know that artists can evolve and stay relevant in an ever-changing market."

— Lori Landew of Fox Rothschild notes the potential of Cyrus adopting another public image by comparison to women from a similar background.

Bangerz and its promotional events have been largely credited with establishing a sexually provocative image for Cyrus. Zack O'Malley Greenburg from Forbes noted that her performances, music videos, and public behavior received "plenty of condemnation along with all the attention" in the lead-up to the record; he suggested that this was intentionally done so "[parents will] never again buy any products related to Cyrus–or her former alter-ego, tween sensation Hannah Montana." John Murphy from MusicOMH stated that Cyrus' performance at the MTV Video Music Awards became "the seismic event that ensured we'd never recall 2013 without thinking of her", further opining that the anticipation it built for Bangerz made it "impossible not to admire her PR operation."

Andrew Unterberger of Billboard felt that Bangerz developed the maturing image for Cyrus that her third album Can't Be Tamed (2010) failed to accomplish. He suggested that she had "no true backup plan" for creating a new public persona in 2010, and stated that she "now feels firmly in control of her music and her image" in 2013. Marlow Stern from The Daily Beast shared a similar sentiment, stating that Cyrus "is completely in control of what she's doing" after her controversies that year, which he described as "pure artistic calculation born out of mild desperation", and has successfully done "just about anything to gain our attention". Zack O'Malley Greenburg of Forbes commented that despite widespread criticism of "chasing YouTube views and record sales at the expense of her image", the "new Cyrus" appears "marketable as ever." Writing for Glamour, Mickey Woods compared the promotional "era" for Bangerz to those of Britney Spears' and Christina Aguilera's third and fourth studio albums Britney (2001) and Stripped (2002), respectively, in that "both albums by these legends were wildly experimental", adding that Cyrus' project "will probably be retrospectively deemed iconic, maybe even classic." Mark Jacobs of V likened the album to Control (1986) by Janet Jackson, in that Cyrus was "an artist coming into her own" in a fashion similar to Jackson.

Patrick Ryan of USA Today commented that Cyrus' collaborations with Mike Will Made It contributed to his new-found prominence, stating that Mike Will Made It's position as an executive producer has helped him "[jump] to the forefront as an interesting character [...] in an era where a lot of producers have fallen behind the scenes again". From a commercial standpoint, however, Suzanne Cowie of Babble suggested that Cyrus' opening-week sales figures and subsequent decline supported the idea that the studio album format is reaching its end, having used her example to exemplify that "consumers are only interested in the single". She further opined that they do not "[have] the time to sit and listen through to an album in its entirety", and credited the rise of digital downloads with promoting a less engaging listening process, where consumers "[have not] connected in any way with the band/singer and their hopes for the record."

In December 2013 MTV named Cyrus as their Best Artist of 2013, for which criteria including Bangerz's sales were taken into consideration. James Montgomery from MTV News elaborated on the network's decision that Cyrus "[declared] her independence and [dominated] the pop-culture landscape", adding that "she schooled—and shocked—us all in 2013, and did so on her own terms." In early December 2013, Cyrus was listed in the top ten finalists for Time Person of the Year, the only entertainer in the list, though she lost to Pope Francis; she was also listed on Barbara Walters' "Most Fascinating People of the Year". Billboard staff called Cyrus the "Most Talked About Pop Star" of 2013, and also recognized the controversial evolution of her career as the "Top Music Moment" of the year, elaborating that she was a "maelstrom that expanded and grazed nearly every aspect of pop culture in 2013." Cyrus was also the most-searched person of the year on Google, with Leah Chernikoff of Elle writing that "most folks, even famous ones, only strike Internet gold like that once in a lifetime (or maybe once a year), but Cyrus hit it again—and again—in 2013."

In 2025, reviewing Cyrus' Something Beautiful, The Needle Drop's Anthony Fantano noted: "[...] in a lot of ways, you could actually say [Cyrus] set the tone for some of these newer faces who took a similar path and also got a bit edgier in their transition into pop stardom. I mean, it's funny to think of how many people just freak out on social media over stuff like Sabrina Carpenter's 'Juno' live performance poses. But I don't know. To me, that's nothing in comparison with the stuff Miley Cyrus was doing on stage during the Bangerz era."

== Track listing ==
Standard edition
| No. | Title | Writer(s) | Producer(s) | Length |
|---|---|---|---|---|
| 1. | "Adore You" | Stacy Barthe; Oren Yoel | Yoel | 4:38 |
| 2. | "We Can't Stop" | Michael Williams II; Pierre Slaughter; Timothy Thomas; Theron Thomas; Miley Cyrus; Douglas Davis; Ricky Walters | Mike Will Made It; P-Nasty^{[a]}; Rock City^{[b]} | 3:51 |
| 3. | "SMS (Bangerz)" (featuring Britney Spears) | M. Williams; Marquel Middlebrooks; Sean Garrett; Cyrus | Mike Will Made It; Marz^{[a]} | 2:49 |
| 4. | "4x4" (featuring Nelly) | Cornell Haynes, Jr.; Pharrell Williams; Cyrus | P. Williams | 3:11 |
| 5. | "My Darlin'" (featuring Future) | Nayvadius Wilburn; M. Williams; Slaughter; Jeremy Felton; Jerry Leiber; Mike Stoller; Ben E. King; Cyrus | Mike Will Made It; P-Nasty^{[a]}; Tyler Sam Johnson^{[c]} | 4:03 |
| 6. | "Wrecking Ball" | Lukasz Gottwald; Maureen McDonald; Stephan Moccio; Sacha Skarbek; Henry Walter; David Kim | Dr. Luke; Cirkut | 3:41 |
| 7. | "Love Money Party" (featuring Big Sean) | Sean Anderson; M. Williams; Middlebrooks; Wilburn; Garrett; Cyrus | Mike Will Made It; Marz^{[a]} | 3:39 |
| 8. | "#GetItRight" | P. Williams | P. Williams | 4:24 |
| 9. | "Drive" | M. Williams; Slaughter; Samuel Jean; Ethan Lowery; Cyrus | Mike Will Made It; P-Nasty^{[a]} | 4:15 |
| 10. | "FU" (featuring French Montana) | Karim Kharbouch; Rami Samir Afuni; McDonald; Cyrus | Afuni | 3:51 |
| 11. | "Do My Thang" | William Adams; Michael McHenry; Ryan "DJ Replay" Buendia; Kyle Edwards; Jean-Baptiste; Cyrus | McHenry; Edwards; will.i.am^{[a]} | 3:45 |
| 12. | "Maybe You're Right" | M. Williams; Slaughter; Camaron Ochs; John Shanks; T. Johnson; Cyrus | Mike Will Made It; P-Nasty^{[a]} | 3:33 |
| 13. | "Someone Else" | M. Williams; Slaughter; Timothy Thomas; Theron Thomas; McDonald; Cyrus | Mike Will Made It; P-Nasty^{[a]} | 4:48 |
| Total length: | | | | 50:28 |

Deluxe edition
| No. | Title | Writer(s) | Producer(s) | Length |
|---|---|---|---|---|
| 14. | "Rooting for My Baby" | P. Williams; Cyrus | P. Williams | 3:20 |
| 15. | "On My Own" | P. Williams | P. Williams | 3:52 |
| 16. | "Hands in the Air" (featuring Ludacris) | Christopher Bridges; M. Williams; Slaughter; Jean; Asia Bryant; Cyrus | Mike Will Made It; P-Nasty^{[a]} | 3:22 |
| Total length: | | | | 61:02 |

10th anniversary edition
| No. | Title | Writer(s) | Producer(s) | Length |
|---|---|---|---|---|
| 17. | "23" (Mike Will Made It featuring Miley Cyrus, Wiz Khalifa, and Juicy J) | M. Williams; Cyrus; Jordan Houston; Cameron Thomaz; Timothy Thomas; Theron Thomas; Slaughter | Mike Will Made It; P-Nasty^{[a]} | 4:12 |
| Total length: | | | | 65:14 |

=== Notes ===
- ^{^[a]}signifies a co-producer
- ^{^[b]}signifies a vocal producer
- ^{^[c]}signifies an additional producer
- "We Can't Stop" contains a portion of the composition "La Di Da Di", written by Douglas Davis and Ricky Walters.
- "SMS (Bangerz)" contains a portion of the composition "Push It", written by Hurby Azor and Ray Davies.
- "My Darlin'" contains a portion of the composition "Stand by Me", written by Jerry Leiber, Mike Stoller, and Ben E. King.

== Credits and personnel ==
Management

- Miley Cyrus – executive producer
- Mike Will Made It – executive producer

Vocals

- Miley Cyrus – lead vocals, background vocals
- Britney Spears – featured vocals
- Nelly – rap, featured vocals
- Future – rap, featured vocals
- Big Sean – rap, featured vocals
- French Montana – rap, featured vocals
- Ludacris – rap, featured vocals

Production

- Miley Cyrus – songwriter
- Oren Yoel – songwriter, producer
- Mike Will Made It – songwriter, producer
- Rock City – songwriter, vocal producer
- Doug E. Fresh – songwriter
- Slick Rick – songwriter
- P-Nasty – songwriter, co-producer
- Marz – songwriter, producer
- Sean Tallman – recording
- Sean Garrett – songwriter
- Pharrell Williams – songwriter, producer
- Nelly – songwriter
- Future – songwriter
- Jeremih – songwriter
- Jerry Leiber – songwriter
- Mike Stoller – songwriter
- Ben E. King – songwriter
- Tyler Sam Johnson – songwriter, additional producer
- Dr. Luke – songwriter, producer, programming
- Maureen McDonald – songwriter
- Stephan Moccio – songwriter
- Sacha Skarbek – songwriter
- Sven Heidinga – engineer
- Big Sean – songwriter
- French Montana – songwriter
- Rami Samir Afuni – songwriter, producer
- Michael McHenry – songwriter, producer
- Ryan Buendia – songwriter
- Mike Caffrey – engineer
- Kyle Edwards – songwriter, producer
- Samuel Jean – songwriter
- Andrew Colleman – arrangement, recording, digital editing
- Jean Baptiste – songwriter
- Cameron Ochs – songwriter
- Phil Allen – engineer
- John Shanks – songwriter
- Todd Robinson – recording assistant
- Asia Bryant – songwriter
- Jacob Dennis – recording assistant
- Manny Marroquin – mixing
- Chris Galland – mixing assistant
- Rene Toledo, Jr. – recording assistant
- Delbert Bowers – mixing assistant
- Doron Dina – recording assistant
- Chris O'Brian – engineering
- Chris "Tek" O'Ryan – sound engineering

Instrumentation

- Paul Dateh – instrumentation
- David Richard Campbell – string arrangement, conductor
- Rudy Stein – cello
- Steve Richards – cello
- Suzie Katayama – cello
- Steven Wolf – drum
- Dr. Luke – instrumentation
- Cirkut – instrumentation
- Stephan Moccio – piano
- Andrew Duckles – viola
- Darrin McCann – viola
- Alyssa Park – violin
- Charlie Bisharat – violin
- Grace Oh – violin
- Joel Pargman – violin
- John Wittenberg – violin
- Kevin Connolly – violin
- Sara Parkins – violin
- Songa Lee – violin
- Chad Hugo – guitar, whistle
- Chris Cab – guitar

Credits adapted from Bangerz liner notes.

== Charts ==
=== Weekly charts ===
2013–14 weekly chart performance for Bangerz
| Chart (2013–14) | Peak position |
|---|---|
| Argentine Albums (CAPIF) | 1 |
| Australian Albums (ARIA) | 1 |
| Austrian Albums (Ö3 Austria) | 4 |
| Belgian Albums (Ultratop Flanders) | 5 |
| Belgian Albums (Ultratop Wallonia) | 11 |
| Canadian Albums (Billboard) | 1 |
| China Albums (Sino Chart) | 10 |
| Czech Albums (ČNS IFPI) | 11 |
| Danish Albums (Hitlisten) | 3 |
| Dutch Albums (Album Top 100) | 6 |
| Finnish Albums (Suomen virallinen lista) | 23 |
| French Albums (SNEP) | 9 |
| German Albums (Offizielle Top 100) | 9 |
| Greek Albums (IFPI) | 5 |
| Hungarian Albums (MAHASZ) | 8 |
| Irish Albums (IRMA) | 1 |
| Italian Albums (FIMI) | 3 |
| Japanese Albums (Oricon) | 24 |
| Mexican Albums (Top 100 Mexico) | 1 |
| New Zealand Albums (RMNZ) | 2 |
| Norwegian Albums (VG-lista) | 1 |
| Polish Albums (ZPAV) | 20 |
| Portuguese Albums (AFP) | 4 |
| Spanish Albums (Promusicae) | 2 |
| South African Albums (RISA) | 5 |
| South Korean Albums (Circle) | 21 |
| South Korean International Albums (Circle) | 4 |
| Swedish Albums (Sverigetopplistan) | 4 |
| Swiss Albums (Schweizer Hitparade) | 7 |
| Scottish Albums (Official Charts) | 1 |
| Taiwan International Albums (G-Music) | 1 |
| UK Albums (Official Charts) | 1 |
| US Billboard 200 | 1 |

2023 weekly chart performance for Bangerz
| Chart (2023) | Peak position |
|---|---|
| Greek Albums (IFPI) | 2 |

2025 weekly chart performance for Bangerz
| Chart (2025) | Peak position |
|---|---|
| Portuguese Streaming Albums (AFP) | 194 |

=== Monthly charts ===
Monthly chart performance for Bangerz
| Chart (2013) | Peak position |
|---|---|
| Uruguayan Albums (CUD) | 5 |

=== Year-end charts ===
2013 year-end chart performance for Bangerz
| Chart (2013) | Position |
|---|---|
| Argentine Albums (CAPIF) | 22 |
| Australian Albums (ARIA) | 64 |
| Belgian Albums (Ultratop Flanders) | 100 |
| Belgian Albums (Ultratop Wallonia) | 161 |
| Canadian Albums (Billboard) | 32 |
| French Albums (SNEP) | 159 |
| Italian Albums (FIMI) | 86 |
| Mexican Albums (Top 100 Mexico) | 47 |
| Spanish Albums (PROMUSICAE) | 35 |
| Swedish Albums (Sverigetopplistan) | 30 |
| UK Albums (OCC) | 71 |
| US Billboard 200 | 51 |
| Worldwide Albums (IFPI) | 20 |

2014 year-end chart performance for Bangerz
| Chart (2014) | Position |
|---|---|
| Belgian Albums (Ultratop Flanders) | 142 |
| Belgian Albums (Ultratop Wallonia) | 175 |
| Canadian Albums (Billboard) | 44 |
| Mexican Albums (Top 100 Mexico) | 95 |
| Swedish Albums (Sverigetopplistan) | 37 |
| US Billboard 200 | 23 |

=== Decade-end charts ===
Decade-end chart performance for Bangerz
| Chart (2010–2019) | Position |
|---|---|
| US Billboard 200 | 108 |

== Certifications ==
Certifications and sales for Bangerz
| Region | Certification | Certified units/sales |
|---|---|---|
| Australia (ARIA) | Platinum | 70,000^{‡} |
| Austria (IFPI Austria) | Gold | 7,500^{*} |
| Brazil (Pro-Música Brasil) | 3× Platinum | 120,000^{‡} |
| Canada (Music Canada) | 2× Platinum | 160,000^{‡} |
| Denmark (IFPI Danmark) | Platinum | 20,000^{‡} |
| Germany (BVMI) | Gold | 100,000^{‡} |
| Italy (FIMI) | Gold | 25,000^{‡} |
| Mexico (AMPROFON) | Gold | 30,000^{^} |
| New Zealand (RMNZ) | 3× Platinum | 45,000^{‡} |
| Norway (IFPI Norway) | 4× Platinum | 80,000^{‡} |
| Poland (ZPAV) | Platinum | 20,000^{*} |
| Spain (Promusicae) | Gold | 20,000^{‡} |
| Sweden (GLF) | Platinum | 40,000^{‡} |
| United Kingdom (BPI) | Gold | 100,000^{*} |
| United States (RIAA) | 3× Platinum | 3,000,000^{‡} |
^{*} Sales figures based on certification alone.^{^} Shipments figures based on certification alone.^{‡} Sales+streaming figures based on certification alone.

== Release history ==
Bangerz release history
| Region | Date | Format | Edition(s) | Label | Ref. |
|---|---|---|---|---|---|
| Australia | October 4, 2013 | Standard; deluxe | Digital download | RCA | |
| Austria | October 4, 2013 | Deluxe | Digital download | RCA | |
| Belgium | October 4, 2013 | Standard; deluxe | Digital download | RCA | |
| Canada | October 4, 2013 | Standard; deluxe | Digital download | RCA | |
| Finland | October 4, 2013 | Deluxe | Digital download | RCA | |
| France | October 4, 2013 | Standard; deluxe | Digital download | RCA | |
| Germany | October 4, 2013 | CD; digital download | Standard | RCA | |
| Germany | October 4, 2013 | Digital download | Deluxe | RCA | |
| Hong Kong | October 4, 2013 | Digital download | Deluxe | RCA | |
| Italy | October 4, 2013 | Digital download | Standard; deluxe | RCA | |
| Japan | October 4, 2013 | Digital download | Standard; deluxe | RCA | |
| Netherlands | October 4, 2013 | Digital download | Standard; deluxe | RCA | |
| New Zealand | October 4, 2013 | Digital download | Standard; deluxe | RCA | |
| Poland | October 4, 2013 | Digital download | Deluxe | RCA | |
| Russia | October 4, 2013 | Digital download | Deluxe | RCA | |
| United States | October 4, 2013 | Digital download | Standard; deluxe | RCA | |
| France | October 7, 2013 | CD | Standard; deluxe | Sony | |
| United Kingdom | October 7, 2013 | CD; digital download | Standard; deluxe | RCA | |
| Brazil | October 8, 2013 | CD | Deluxe | Sony | |
| Canada | October 8, 2013 | CD | Standard; deluxe | Sony | |
| Italy | October 8, 2013 | CD | Standard; deluxe | RCA | |
| Poland | October 8, 2013 | CD | Standard; deluxe | Sony | |
| Spain | October 8, 2013 | CD | Standard; deluxe | Sony | |
| United States | October 8, 2013 | CD | Standard; deluxe | RCA | |
| Mexico | October 15, 2013 | CD | Deluxe | Sony | |
| Japan | October 23, 2013 | CD | Deluxe | Sony | |
| United States | November 26, 2013 | Picture disc | Deluxe | RCA | |
| India | January 24, 2014 | CD | Standard | Sony | |
| United States | April 22, 2017 | LP | Deluxe | RCA | |
| Various | September 29, 2023 | LP | 10th anniversary reissue | Sony | |

== See also ==
- List of number-one albums of 2013 (Australia)
- List of number-one albums of 2013 (Canada)
- List of UK Albums Chart number ones of the 2010s
- List of Billboard 200 number-one albums of 2013
