= 23 (Mike Will Made It song) =

2013 single by Mike Will Made It featuring Miley Cyrus, Wiz Khalifa, and Juicy J

Single by Mike Will Made It featuring Miley Cyrus, Wiz Khalifa and Juicy J
- Released: September 10, 2013
- Recorded: 2013
- Genre: Hip-hop; trap
- Length: 4:12
- Label: Interscope
- Songwriters: Mike Will Made It; Miley Cyrus; Jordan Houston; Cameron Thomaz; Theron Thomas; Timothy Thomas; Pierre Ramon Slaughter
- Producers: Mike Will Made It; P-Nasty

Mike Will Made It singles chronology
"23" (2013)	"Buy the World" (2014)

Miley Cyrus singles chronology
"Wrecking Ball" (2013)	"23" (2013)	"Real and True" (2013)

Wiz Khalifa singles chronology
"We Own It (Fast & Furious)" (2013)	"23" (2013)	"Think About It" (2013)

Juicy J singles chronology
"Bounce It" (2013)	"23" (2013)	"Clappers" (2013)

Music video
- "23" on YouTube

"23" is a song by American record producer Mike Will Made It, featuring American singer Miley Cyrus and American rappers Wiz Khalifa and Juicy J, released as the former's debut single on September 10, 2013, by Interscope Records. Written by the artists alongside R. City and fellow producer Pierre "P-Nasty" Slaughter, it is set to a midtempo beat and lyrically references Air Jordan sneakers and recreational drug use.

"23" received generally mixed reviews from music critics, who were ambivalent towards its production and Cyrus' rapping ability. It peaked at number 11 on the U.S. Billboard Hot 100, and performed moderately on international charts. An accompanying music video was filmed in Brooklyn on August 26, 2013, and premiered through Vevo on September 24, 2013. Cyrus performed the song during the first and second leg of her Bangerz Tour.

== Production and composition ==
"23"
A 7-second sample of "23" by Mike Will Made It featuring Miley Cyrus, Wiz Khalifa, and Juicy J, where the beginning of the chorus is heard.

During the production of "23", Mike Will Made It prepared a verse for himself to rap, which he originally planned to include alongside verses by Juicy J and Wiz Khalifa. However, after the latter two finished their respective recordings, Mike Will Made It decided that his contribution should be replaced by a woman. Mike Will Made It had recently finished producing Miley Cyrus' track "We Can't Stop" for her fourth studio album Bangerz (2013) when she first heard "23" and expressed interest in being included on the track. Mike Will Made It was initially hesitant of her suggestion, having met her earlier that day, although he "left her on there" after "she laid down the verse [and] killed it."

"23" is a synth-driven hip hop song set to a midtempo beat and a "bass-heavy" arrangement. It is distinguished in Cyrus' catalog as the first track in which she raps. In the chorus, Cyrus mentions recreational drug use, particularly in the line "I'm in the club high off purp with some shades on". The track later transitions into the repeated hook "J's on my feet" delivered by Juicy J, which references Air Jordan sneakers.

== Critical reception ==
In a favorable review, Mike Wass of Idolator was complimentary of Mike Will Made It's "slick, multi-layered production" and was indifferent towards Cyrus' contributions. Sharing a similar sentiment, a writer for That Grape Juice stated that the artists "[gave] fans just what they want", adding that they "[went] along to make the jam the smash that it is." Complex ranked "23" at number 23 on their list of the 50 best songs of 2013, saying that Mike Will Made It knew that Miley would make this collaboration even better. However, in a more mixed review, Danielle Cheesman of MSN opined that "the song sounds like everything else Mike WiLL's touched and turned to gold so it will be a smash but, much to Miley's chagrin, it won't be because of her", and criticized Cyrus' verses for "[stealing 2 Chainz's] whole flow." Tony Maglio from The Wrap also questioned her lyrical content, specifically criticizing the lyrics "I back it up, cause I don’t give a fuck" and "I’m MC Hammer fly." Jordan Sargent from Spin called the track "far from Mike Will's best work" and negatively compared Cyrus' delivery to that of Lil Debbie.

== Commercial performance ==
In the United States, "23" entered the Billboard Hot 100 at number 70, and later peaked at number 11. It additionally peaked at number 2 on the Billboard Hot R&B/Hip-Hop Songs component chart.

Elsewhere in North America, the track reached number 26 on the Canadian Hot 100. In Europe, "23" respectively peaked at numbers 19 and 85 on the UK Singles Chart and the UK R&B Chart, both of which are organized by the Official Charts Company. The track respectively peaked at numbers 27 and 1 on the Ultratip component charts in Flanders and Wallonia, representing the fifty songs that failed to reach the flagship Ultratop chart in each Belgian region. It also peaked at number 30 on the French Syndicat National de l'Édition Phonographique, and number 44 on the Spanish Productores de Música de España. In Oceania, "23" reached number 39 on the Australian ARIA Charts and number 22 on the Official New Zealand Music Chart.

== Music video ==
An accompanying music video for "23" was filmed at Bishop Ford Central Catholic High School in Brooklyn on August 26, 2013; it was directed by Hannah Lux Davis and styled by Haley Wollens. An advertisement for a casting call posted to Juicy J's Instagram account requested "edgy, rebellious, sexy, [and] hood types" to appear as extras in the clip, and further stated that individuals "must wear [their] favorite pair of Jordans".

The music video was premiered through Vevo on September 24. The music video takes place in a high school; it begins with the school principal leaving his office, which Mike Will Made It enters and begins playing "23" on a Beats Pill over the intercom. Interspersed throughout are scenes of Cyrus wearing a bikini similar to Michael Jordan's Chicago Bulls basketball jersey; she is frequently shown smoking in the bathroom and writing on its mirrors with red lipstick. Khalifa raps his verse in a chemistry lab, while Juicy J's verse is rapped in a trophy room. A school-wide pep rally later takes place, where Cyrus is gyrating against Mike Will Made It and notably wearing the foam finger used in her controversial performance at the 2013 MTV Video Music Awards in August. Cash Money rappers Birdman and Mack Maine make cameos.

Critics were divided in their opinions for the music video. In a more favorable review, Zayda Rivera of Daily News stated that Cyrus is "undoubtedly the star of the video" and that the "ultimate cameo takes place when Cyrus brings back the infamous foam finger she waved and gyrated against during her MTV Video Music Awards performance". Ray Rahman from Entertainment Weekly recognized the prominent 1990s influence throughout the clip, and felt it was "reminiscent" to the visuals for "Make 'Em Say Uhh!" by Master P. In a more critical review, Carl Williott of Idolator opined that the music video was "sort of like a massive hip-hop version of the "Smells Like Teen Spirit" video, with Air Jordans and Beats instead of anarchy symbols", while Kayla Upadhyaya from The Michigan Daily called it a "pile of red and black vomit and a poorly edited mishmash of uninspired shots".

== Live performances ==
Cyrus performed the song during the first and second legs of her Bangerz Tour. During the third leg of the tour, "23" was replaced with The Beatles' "Lucy in the Sky with Diamonds". During the performance, Cyrus wore black-and-red Jordan 1 sneakers, a striped fishnet bikini and crotchless leather chaps with "Miley" scrawled down the side, through which she paid homage to Christina Aguilera's "Dirrty" music video. Aguilera herself approved of the outfit and named Cyrus her 'dirrty girl' successor, writing, "Cheers from one dirrty girl to the next @MileyCyrus...wear em' loud & proud, girl- yes!!" on her Twitter account. Jane Stevenson of the Toronto Sun praised the performance and wrote that it saw Cyrus finally twerk it out with her dancers.

== Charts ==
=== Weekly charts ===
Weekly chart performance
Chart (2013–2014)	Peak position
Australia (ARIA)	39
Belgium (Ultratip Bubbling Under Flanders)	27
Belgium (Ultratop Flanders Urban)	18
Belgium (Ultratip Bubbling Under Wallonia)	1
Bulgaria Airplay (BAMP)	5
Canada Hot 100 (Billboard)	26
France (SNEP)	30
New Zealand (Recorded Music NZ)	22
Spain (Promusicae)	44
UK Singles (Official Charts Company)	85
UK Hip Hop/R&B (Official Charts)	19
US Billboard Hot 100	11
US Hot R&B/Hip-Hop Songs (Billboard)	2
US Rhythmic Airplay (Billboard)	8

=== Year-end charts ===
Annual chart rankings
Chart (2013)	Position
Australia Urban (ARIA)	43
Belgium (Ultratop Flanders Urban)	71
US Hot R&B/Hip-Hop Songs (Billboard)	32
US Rap Songs (Billboard)	26
US Streaming Songs (Billboard)	46

Chart (2014)	Position
France (SNEP)	152
US Billboard Hot 100	90
US Hot R&B/Hip-Hop Songs (Billboard)	25
US Rhythmic (Billboard)	47

== Certifications ==
Region	Certification	Certified units/sales
Brazil (Pro-Música Brasil)	3× Platinum	180,000^{‡}
Denmark (IFPI Danmark)	Gold	45,000^{‡}
Germany (BVMI)	Gold	150,000^{‡}
New Zealand (RMNZ)	Gold	15,000^{‡}
Sweden (GLF)	Gold	20,000^{‡}
United Kingdom (BPI)	Silver	200,000^{‡}
United States (RIAA)	4× Platinum	4,000,000^{‡}
^{‡} Sales+streaming figures based on certification alone.

== Release history ==
Country	Date	Format	Label	Ref.
The Americas	September 10, 2013	Digital download	Interscope	
Various	September 13, 2013	Digital download	Interscope	
United States	September 17, 2013	Rhythmic contemporary	Interscope	
