= FU (song) =

2013 song by Miley Cyrus featuring French Montana

Song by Miley Cyrus featuring French Montana

from the album Bangerz
- Released: September 30, 2013
- Recorded: 2013
- Studio: Milkboy Studios (Philadelphia, PA); Westlake Recording Studios (Los Angeles, CA)
- Genre: Dubstep; EDM
- Length: 3:51
- Label: RCA
- Songwriters: Rami Samir Afuni; Maureen McDonald; Karim Kharbouch; Miley Cyrus
- Producer: Afuni

"FU" is a dubstep and EDM song by American singer Miley Cyrus, featuring American rapper French Montana for her fourth studio album, Bangerz (2013). It was written by Cyrus and Montana themselves, alongside Rami Samir Afuni and MoZella. Production was helmed by Afuni. The song was recorded at Milkboy Studios, based in Philadelphia, and Westlake Recording Studios, based in Los Angeles, California. Musically, the song is a dubstep-influenced track about the dismissal of a cheating ex.

"FU" received generally favorable reviews from contemporary music critics. The song itself was compared to the music of Amy Winehouse, Lady Gaga and Skrillex. However, some criticized its lyrics and the appearance of French Montana. The song peaked at number one on the Billboard Bubbling Under Hot 100 Singles chart, number 22 on the Pop Digital Songs chart and number 85 in Canada. "FU" was used in the 2013 Victoria's Secret Fashion Show. Cyrus performed the song during her Bangerz Tour.

== Production and composition ==
"FU" was written by Cyrus, Rami Samir Afuni, French Montana and MoZella. It was produced by Afuni. Karl Petersen recorded the track with help from Matthew Testa, and Manny Marroquin mixed it with assistants Chris Galland and Delbert Bowers. According to the sheet music published at Musicnotes.com by Kobalt Music Publishing America, the track is written in the key of G minor with a tempo of 56 beats per minute. Critics identified elements of dubstep and EDM in the song. According to Kyle Fowle of Slant Magazine, the amalgamation of popular genres Cyrus employs throughout the album is perhaps best executed on "FU". He further wrote that although "I've got two, two, two letters for you/One of them is F, and the other is U" may not be wittiest couplet, but when sung by Cyrus atop a heavy dubstep wobble, it feels biting and ferocious.

"FU"
A 21-second sample of "FU" by Miley Cyrus, where a portion of the chorus is heard.

Montana told MTV News about working with Cyrus, "I was in L.A. and she happened to be doing the 'Ain't Worried About Nothin'' remix for me. She came by the studio and let me hear her album, which was crazy, and we just went through a couple tracks to see which one I fit on." He continued, "Then she played 'FU' and I fell in love with it. We just went in there and did it together." Regarding the theme of the song, he explained, "It's two letters 'F' and 'U.' You've just got two letters for somebody when you get to that point, when somebody breaks your heart and you're in a relationship which has gone sour. So now you've only got two letters for them, 'F' and 'U'." Its lyrics dismiss a cheating ex, as mentioned in the lines "I don't really have much to say/ I was over it the second that I saw her name/ I got two letters for you/ One of them is F/ And the other one is U/ 'Cause what you gotta do/ is go get yourself a clue."

== Reception ==
Upon its release, the song received praise from music critics. Heather Phares of AllMusic gave the song a favorable review, calling it a "brassy empowerment jam which sells Cyrus as an independent woman." Nick Catucci of Entertainment Weekly praised the song, describing it as folding "starry Adele-style sass and a French Montana verse into expertly inlaid dubstep wub-wubs." Mikael Wood from the Los Angeles Times praised Cyrus' vocals and compared the song to Amy Winehouse, writing "Her vocals are equally strong in the surprisingly Amy Winehouse-like 'FU'." Caroline Sullivan from The Guardian deemed it one of the album's best songs, writing "FU's mix of raw heartbreak, sub-bass and scathing rhyming from French Montana is devastating." Kitty Empire from The Observer reviewed the song positively, writing "Cyrus liberates her inner Christina Aguilera in the company of rapper French Montana, blending old-time jazzy balladry, I Put a Spell on You, romantic righteousness and dubstep sub-bass." Writing for MTV, John Walker reviewed the song positively, calling it an "innovative surprisingly cabaret-friendly track" and compared it to the works of Amanda Palmer. John Murphy of MusicOMH compared the song to works by Lady Gaga and called it "rather excellent." Kyle Fowle from Slant Magazine heavily praised the track while comparing it to the works of Amy Winehouse and Skrillex, writing, "Cyrus plays the femme fatale with an exaggerated Southern drawl, ready to rip into male suitors and their tired pick-up lines." Catriona Wightman of Digital Spy speculated it to be inspired by Cyrus' former fiancé Liam Hemsworth and deemed it the best song of the album.

Jason Lipshutz of Billboard gave the song a mixed review, calling it a "campy piano flare-up", but criticizing French Montana's appearance, calling it "as inexplicable as the song itself." Marah Eakin of The A.V. Club described it as "EDM-aping". She further stated that the song "seems perfect for the album, rather than just thrown in to stay with the times." Channing Freeman from Sputnikmusic praised Cyrus' vocals, writing, "the chorus is so good, with a pulsing beat that allows Miley plenty of room to show off her voice (which is and always has been lovely)" although criticized the lyrics. Commercially, the song debuted at number three on the US Billboard Bubbling Under Hot 100 Singles Chart and at number 22 on Billboard Pop Digital Songs chart. When the song was used in the 2013 Victoria's Secret Fashion Show, it reached number one on Billboard Bubbling Under Hot 100 Singles Chart. In Canada, the song debuted at number 85 on the Canadian Hot 100. The song also charted at number 54 on the US Digital Song Sales chart and number 9 on the Circle Chart's South Korea Foreign chart. It was later certified Gold by the Recording Industry Association of America (RIAA) for equivalent sales of 500,000 units in the United States.

== Live performances ==
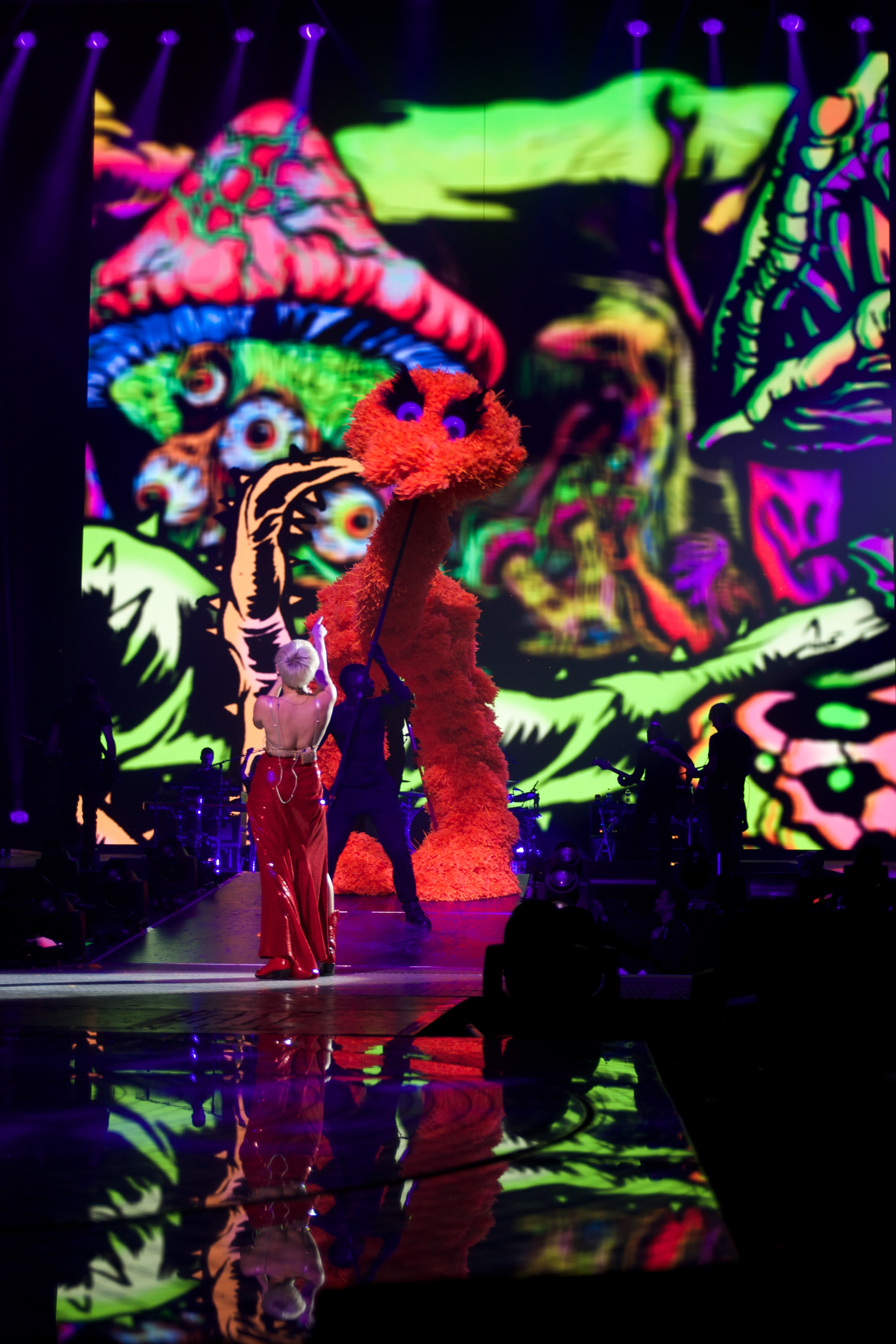
Cyrus performing "FU" at the Rogers Arena in Vancouver, British Columbia, Canada, February 14, 2014

Cyrus has performed the song during her Bangerz Tour. Critics praised her performance of the song, specifically praising Cyrus' vocals and showmanship. While performing "FU" during the first leg of the tour, Cyrus wore a long red sequined skirt over a sequined red and white leotard designed by "The Blonds". She also wore matching gloves and cowboy boots. During the second leg of the show, she replaced the center color of the leotard from red to neon yellow and wore a long feathery yellow skirt with yellow elbow-length gloves. David Blond of The Blonds stated that the pave crystal bodysuit and the rip-away sequin skirt were inspired by Jessica Rabbit. A Sesame Street-esque, bi-pod puppet joined her during the performance. Of her August 4, 2014 performance at the Consol Energy Center in Pittsburgh, Scott Mervis of the Pittsburgh Post-Gazette wrote that she bought the house down "with a show-stopping cabaret vocal" during "FU".

On June 8, 2014, during Cyrus' performance of "FU" at Mediolanum Forum in Milan, Italy; Cyrus performed the song with a fan made cardboard cutout of Selena Gomez wearing a poorly scrawled black bikini. In the middle of the performance, she threw the cardboard cutout back into the crowd. This incident lead to many outlets speculating that Cyrus specifically directed the performance at Gomez. Neither Cyrus nor Gomez responded to the speculations.

== Credits and personnel ==
Credits are adapted from the liner notes of Bangerz.

=== Recording locations ===
- Recorded at Milkboy Studios Philadelphia, Pennsylvania and Westlake Recording Studios, Los Angeles, California
- Mixed at Larrabee Sound Studios (North Hollywood, California)

=== Personnel ===
- Miley Cyrus – lead vocals, songwriter
- French Montana – featured lead vocals, songwriter
- Rami Samir Afuni – songwriter
- Maureen Anne McDonald - songwriter
- Karl Petersen – recording
- Matthew Testa – recording
- Manny Marroquin – mixing
- Chris Galland – assistant
- Delbert Bowers – assistant

== Charts ==
Chart performance for "FU"
| Chart (2013) | Peak position |
|---|---|
| Canada Hot 100 (Billboard) | 85 |
| South Korea Foreign (Circle) | 9 |
| US Bubbling Under Hot 100 (Billboard) | 1 |
| US Digital Song Sales (Billboard) | 54 |
| US Pop Digital Songs (Billboard) | 22 |

== Certifications ==
| Region | Certification | Certified units/sales |
|---|---|---|
| United States (RIAA) | Gold | 500,000^{‡} |
^{‡} Sales+streaming figures based on certification alone.
