= Kiss cam =

Social pastime during sporting events

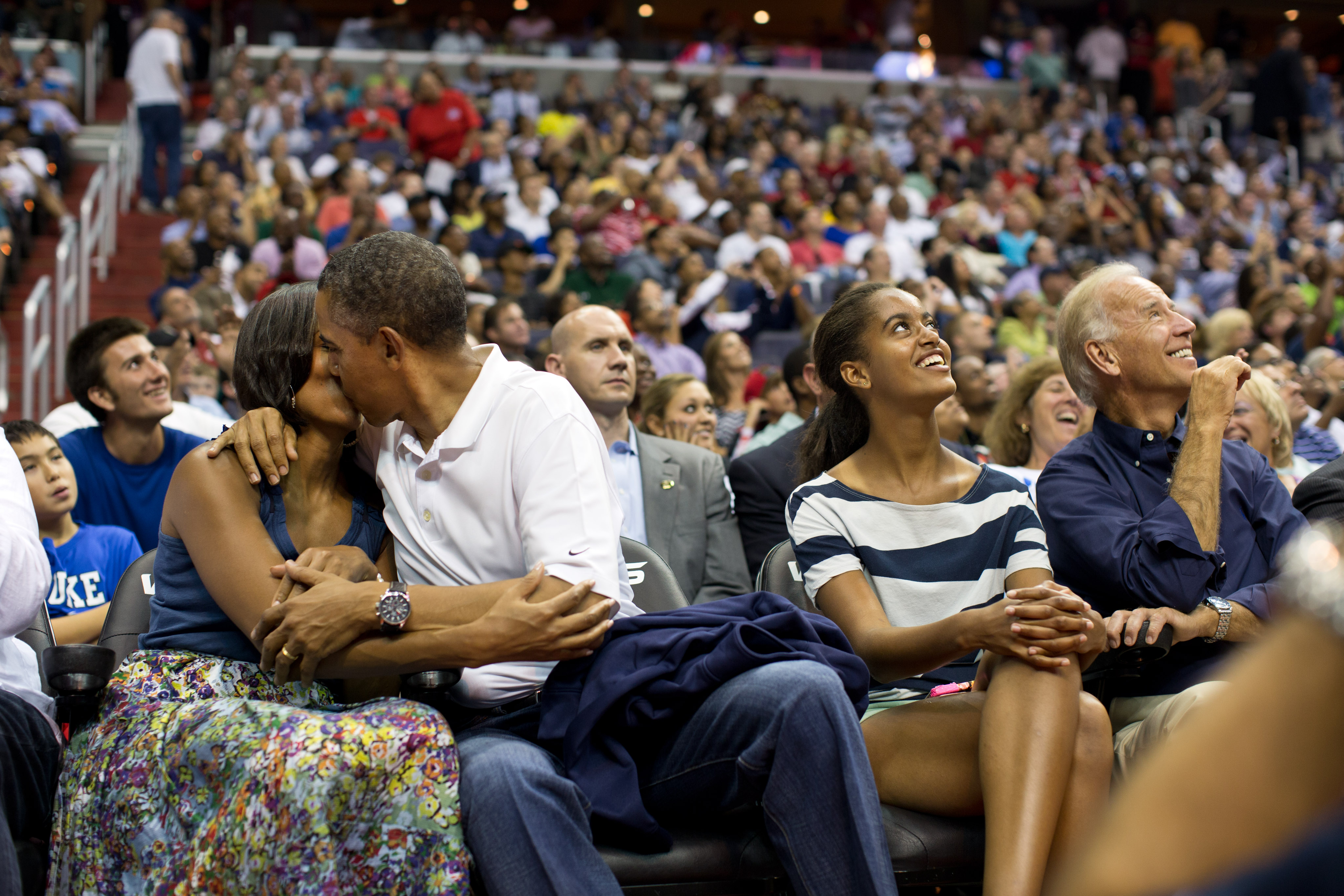
US president Barack Obama and his wife, Michelle Obama, kissing for the kiss cam while Malia Obama and Joe Biden watch on the jumbotron during a basketball game in Washington, DC

A kiss cam is a video camera feature used at sports and entertainment venues in which the camera selects two people in the audience, typically a couple, and broadcasts their image on a large screen with the expectation that they will kiss. The practice is intended as a lighthearted diversion during breaks in the main event, such as timeouts in sports games. A kiss is usually met with cheers or applause from the crowd, while a refusal may prompt boos or laughter.

== Overview ==
The kiss cam tradition originated in California in the early 1980s, as a way to fill in the gaps in play in professional baseball games, taking advantage of the possibilities of the then-new giant video screens.

When the kiss cam is in action, the audience may be alerted by a known 'kiss-related' song being played, and/or an announcer warning the crowd. The crowd attending then pay attention to the marked 'kiss cam' video screen. Normally, several consecutive couples are selected, and appear on the screen. As each pair appear onscreen, they are then expected to kiss. Additionally, sporting event staff may appear as couples who reject kisses or proposals in order to entertain or surprise the attending audience.

A kiss is traditionally rewarded by applause, clapping, cheers and whistles, whereas a refusal to kiss is booed. It is intended as a light-hearted diversion to the main event during a timeout, television timeout, or similar downtime.

In the case of particularly original or sensational shots, the situation may be staged.

== 2025 Coldplay concert ==
On July 16, 2025, during a concert leg of Coldplay's Music of the Spheres World Tour at Gillette Stadium in Foxborough, Massachusetts, a couple appeared on the venue’s kiss-cam during the band's Jumbotron Song segment, where frontman Chris Martin improvised lyrics about audience members shown on screen. The pair reacted by attempting to avoid the camera, drawing attention online. A video of the moment went viral, receiving over 90 million views on TikTok. The individuals were later identified as Andy Byron and Kristin Cabot, executives at a technology startup called Astronomer. Media reports noted that both were married to other people, who were not present at the concert, leading to speculation about a possible extramarital relationship.

Following public scrutiny, Astronomer placed Byron and Cabot on leave and began an internal investigation. The incident became widely discussed online, leading to internet memes, satire in television programs and conversations about media overexposure. The event inspired a mobile game by Jonathan Mann and coincided with increased search traffic for office and infidelity-themed content on adult websites such as Pornhub. Byron resigned from Astronomer three days later and Cabot resigned a week after that. Cabot filed for divorce from her husband on August 13, 2025. A spokesperson for her husband revealed that "he and Kristin were privately and amicably separated several weeks before the Coldplay concert".
