= The Voice (American TV series) season 10 =

The Voice
- Season 10
- Promotional poster featuring coaches Williams, Levine, Aguilera, and Shelton
- Hosted by: Carson Daly
- Coaches: Adam Levine; Pharrell Williams; Christina Aguilera; Blake Shelton
- No. of contestants: 48 artists
- Winner: Alisan Porter
- Winning coach: Christina Aguilera
- Runner-up: Adam Wakefield
- No. of episodes: 28

Release
- Original network: NBC
- Original release: February 29 – May 24, 2016

Season chronology
- ← Previous; Season 9 Next → Season 11

The tenth season of the American reality talent show The Voice premiered on February 29, 2016, on NBC. Carson Daly returned as the show's host. Adam Levine, Blake Shelton, and Pharrell Williams all returned as coaches. Meanwhile, Christina Aguilera returned after a one-season hiatus, replacing Gwen Stefani who did not return as a coach for this season; Stefani instead served as an advisor for Team Blake in the Battles.

For the first time in the show's history, iTunes bonus multipliers were applied to live performances during the finals with the "Cumulative iTunes Vote Total"; duets were also made eligible for downloads but didn't count as a vote for iTunes (although this would later became intact a year later in season twelve).

Alisan Porter was named the winner of the season, marking Christina Aguilera's first win as a coach. Aguilera also became the first female coach to win a season of The Voice, and Porter is the oldest female winner. Additionally, Porter became the first female singer to win a season in any major singing competition in North America (USA, Canada, and Mexico), excluding Got Talent franchises, since female artists achieved a quadruple of winners in 2013: Alex and Sierra's victory on X Factor USA season 3, Candice Glover won American Idol season 12, Danielle Bradbery won season 4 of The Voice USA, and Tessanne Chin won season 5 of The Voice USA.

== Coaches and hosts ==
Adam Levine and Blake Shelton returned for their tenth season as coaches. Pharrell Williams returned for his fourth season and Christina Aguilera returned for her sixth season, after a season's hiatus. The advisor for this season was next season's coach Miley Cyrus, who served as an advisor for all teams during the Knockouts.

Coaches and Host of The Voice Season 10

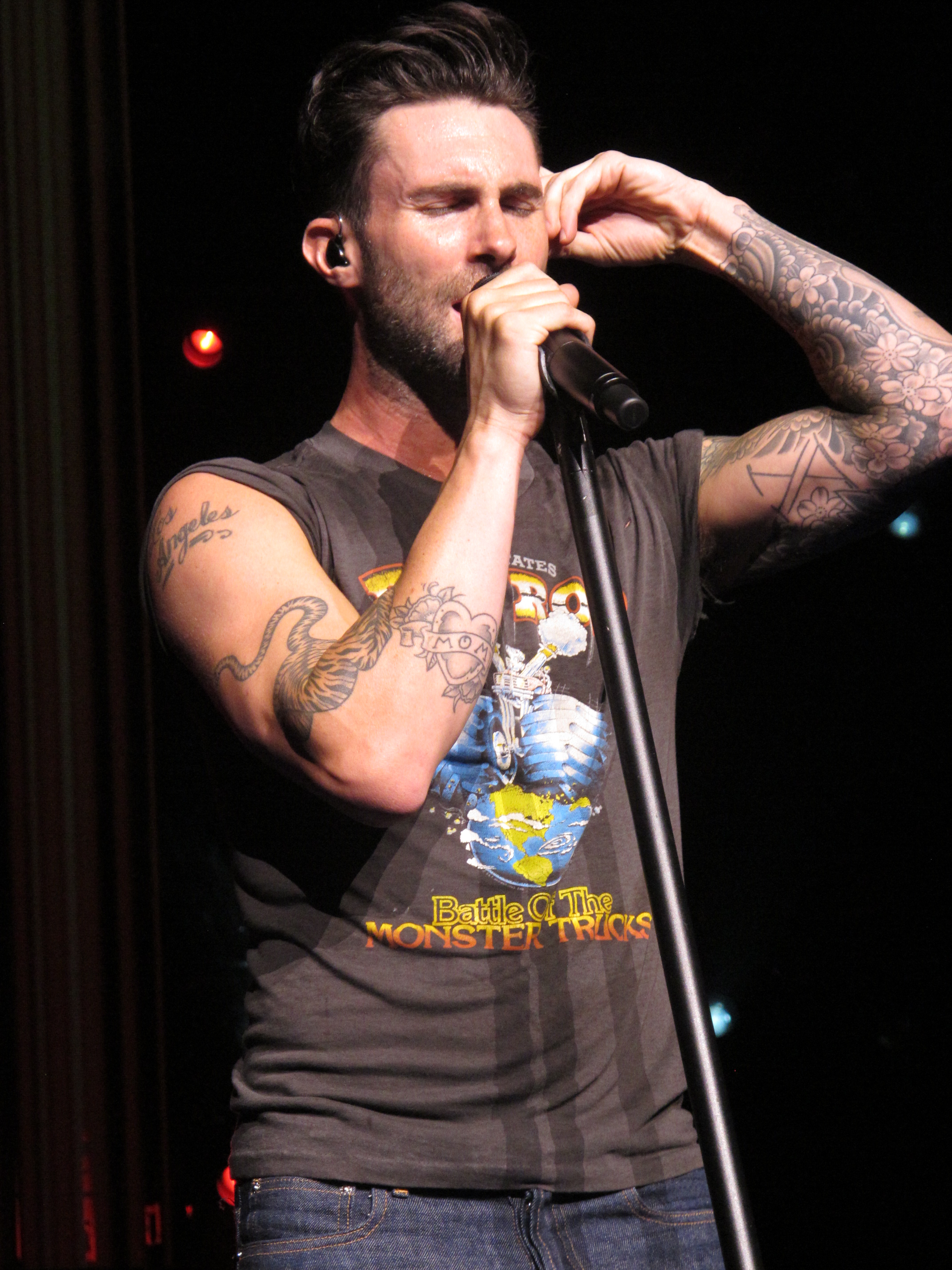
Adam Levine

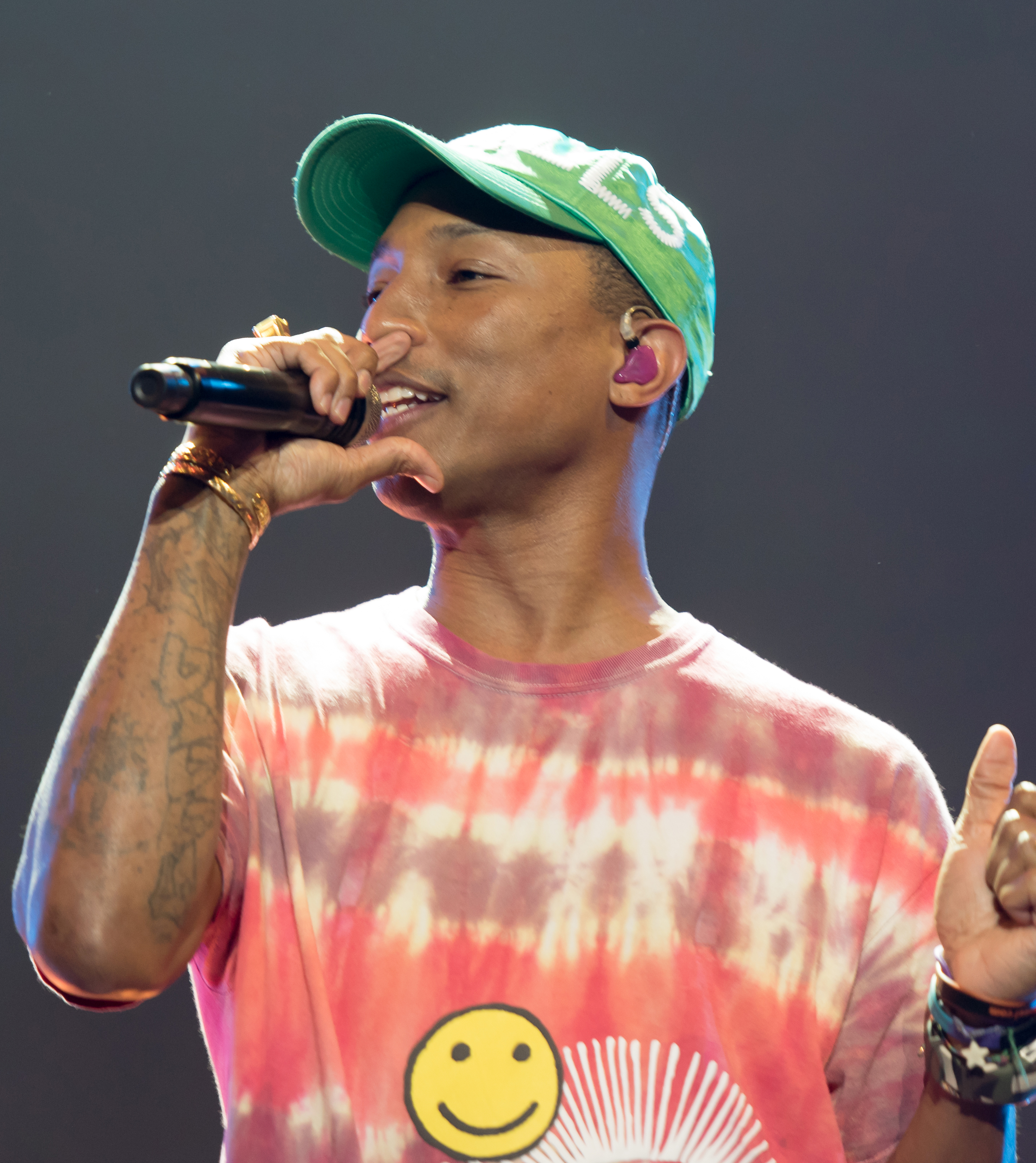
Pharrell Williams

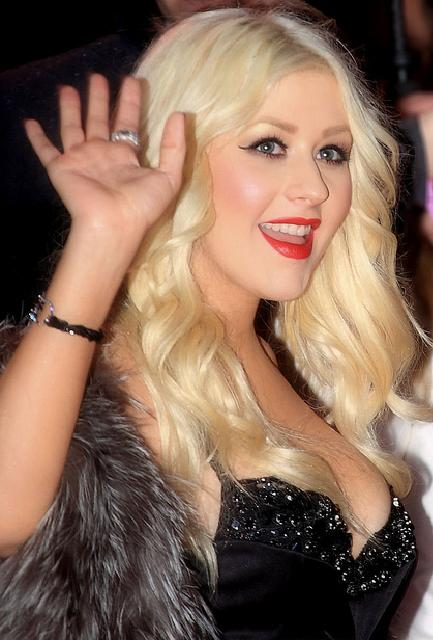
Christina Aguilera

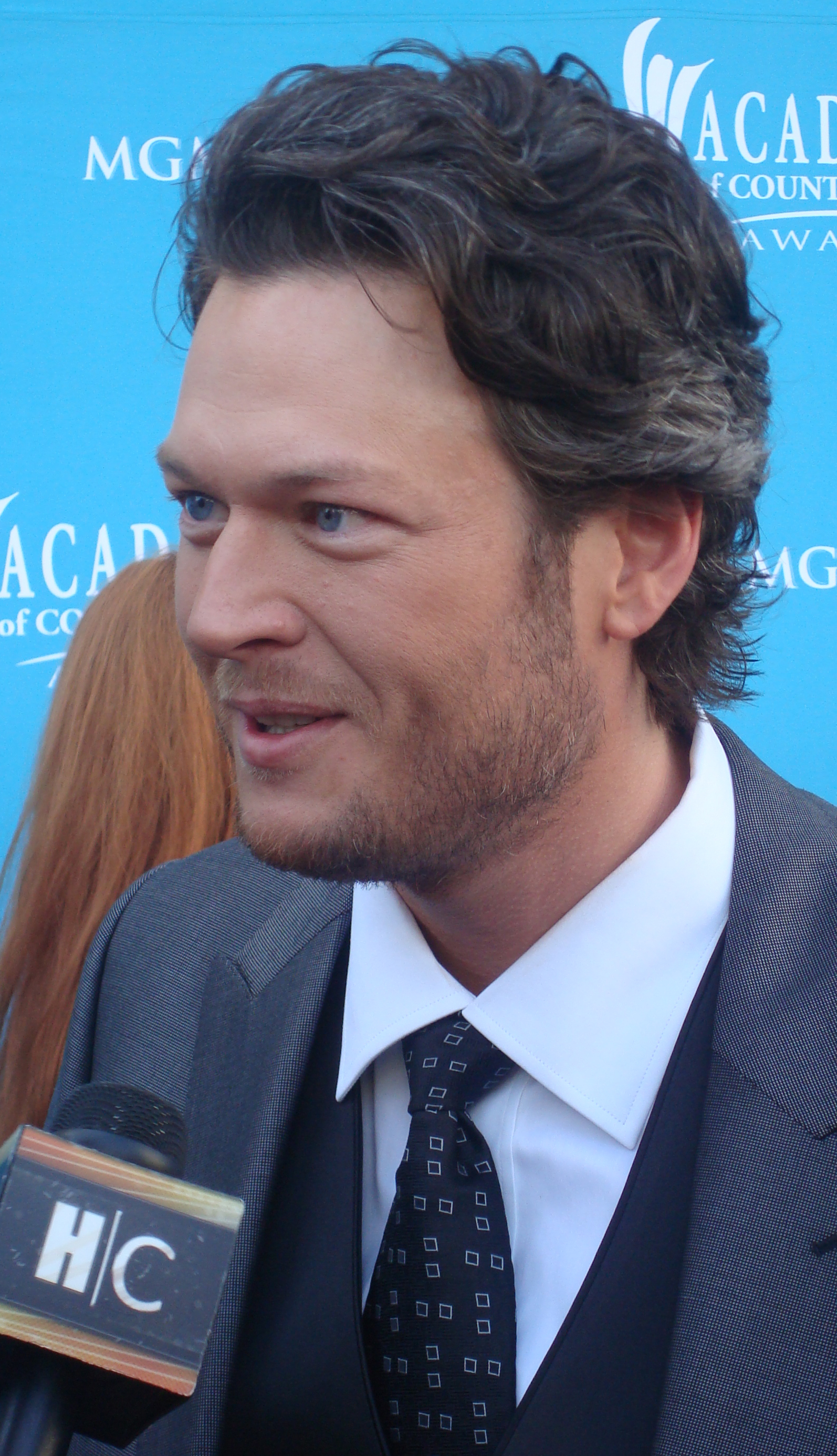
Blake Shelton

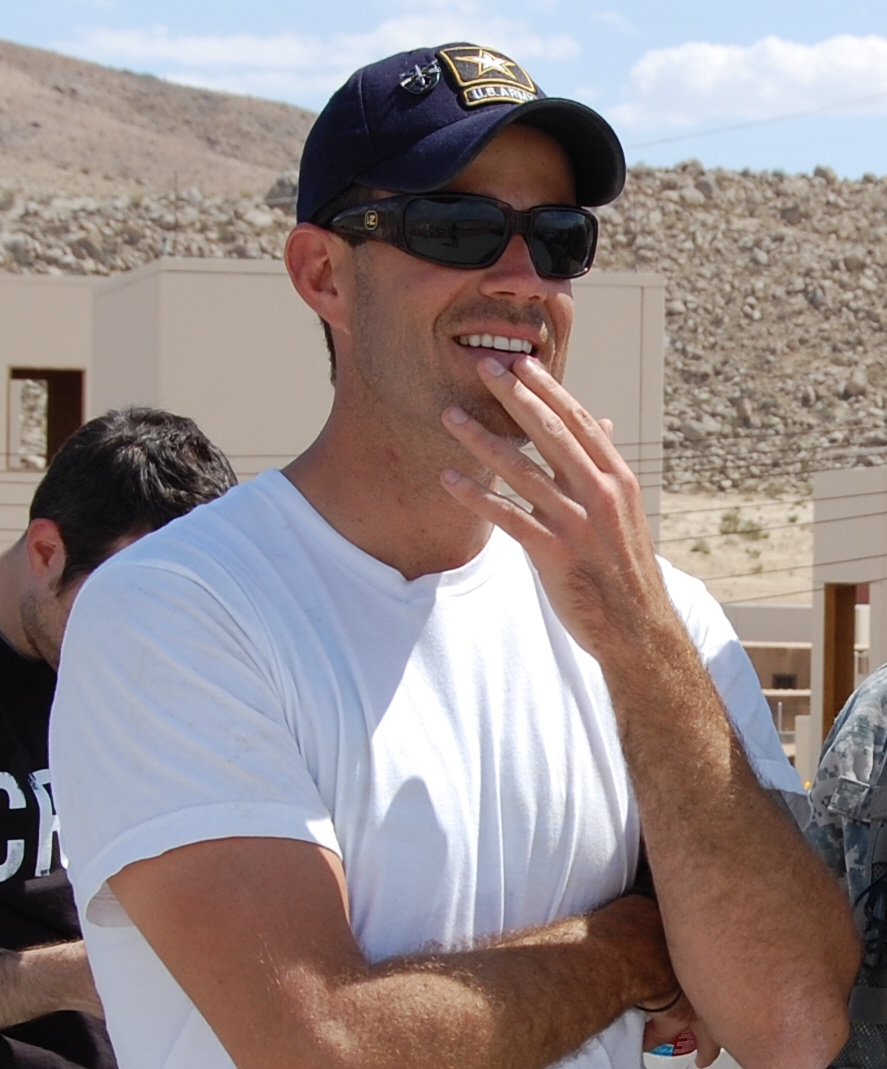
Carson Daly

== Auditions ==
Cities where the auditions were held

The open call auditions were held in the following locations.

| Date(s) | Venue | Location |
|---|---|---|
| June 13, 2015 | Cobo Center | Detroit, Michigan |
| June 20, 2015 | Chesapeake Energy Arena | Oklahoma City, Oklahoma |
| July 18–19, 2015 | Jacob K. Javits Convention Center | New York City, New York |
| July 25–26, 2015 | Los Angeles Convention Center | Los Angeles, California |

== Teams ==
Color key

- Winner
- Runner-up
- Third place
- Fourth place
- Eliminated in the Live Shows
- Eliminated in Live Playoffs
- Selected by another coach as their Coach Comeback
- Stolen in the Knockout rounds
- Eliminated in the Knockout rounds
- Stolen in the Battle rounds
- Eliminated in the Battle rounds

| Coaches | Top 48 artists | | | | | |
|---|---|---|---|---|---|---|
| Adam Levine | | | | | | |
| Adam Levine | Laith Al-Saadi | Shalyah Fearing | Owen Danoff | Caroline Burns | **Nate Butler** | Brian Nhira |
| Adam Levine | ~~Ryan Quinn~~ | Jessica Crosbie | Katherine Ho | ~~Katie Basden~~ | John Gilman | Lily Green |
| Adam Levine | Mike Schiavo | Matt Tedder | Natalie Yacovazzi | | | |
| Pharrell Williams | | | | | | |
| Pharrell Williams | Hannah Huston | **Daniel Passino** | Emily Keener | Lacy Mandigo | Moushumi Chitre | Caity Peters |
| Pharrell Williams | ~~Nick Hagelin~~ | ~~Shalyah Fearing~~ | Abby Celso | Malik Heard | ~~Brian Nhira~~ | ~~Maya Smith~~ |
| Pharrell Williams | ~~Jessica Crosbie~~ | Jonathan Bach | Jonathan Hutcherson | Joe Vivona | | |
| Christina Aguilera | | | | | | |
| Christina Aguilera | Alisan Porter | Bryan Bautista | **Nick Hagelin** | Támar Davis | Kata Hay | Ryan Quinn |
| Christina Aguilera | ~~Daniel Passino~~ | ~~Joe Maye~~ | Trey O'Dell | Maya Smith | ~~Lacy Mandigo~~ | ~~Shalyah Fearing~~ |
| Christina Aguilera | ~~Malik Heard~~ | Chelsea Gann | Ayanna Jahnee | Kristen Marie | | |
| Blake Shelton | | | | | | |
| Blake Shelton | Adam Wakefield | Mary Sarah | Paxton Ingram | Katie Basden | Joe Maye | **Justin Whisnant** |
| Blake Shelton | ~~Lacy Mandigo~~ | Angie Keilhauer | Brittany Kennell | Peyton Parker | ~~Trey O'Dell~~ | Gina Castanzo |
| Blake Shelton | Teresa Guidry | Jared Harder | Brittney Lawrence | | | |
Note: Italicized names are stolen artists (names struck through within former teams). Bolded names are artists who received the Coach Comeback and advanced to the Live Playoffs.

== Blind auditions ==
Color key

| ✔ | Coach hit his or her "I WANT YOU" button |
| | Artist defaulted to this coach's team |
| | Artist selected to join this coach's team |
| | Artist eliminated with no coach pressing his or her "I WANT YOU" button |

=== Episode 1 (Feb. 29) ===
| Order | Artist | Age | Hometown | Song | Coach's and artist's choices | | | |
| Order | Artist | Age | Hometown | Song | Adam | Pharrell | Christina | Blake |
|---|---|---|---|---|---|---|---|---|
| 1 | Paxton Ingram | 23 | Miami, Florida | "Dancing on My Own" | ✔ | ✔ | — | ✔ |
| 2 | Caity Peters | 21 | Long Beach, California | "Jealous" | ✔ | ✔ | ✔ | ✔ |
| 3 | Nick Hagelin | 28 | Atlanta, Georgia | "Lost Stars" | — | ✔ | ✔ | ✔ |
| 4 | Maddie Poppe | 17 | Clarksville, Iowa | "Dog Days Are Over" | — | — | — | — |
| 5 | Mary Sarah | 20 | Richmond, Texas | "Where the Boys Are" | ✔ | ✔ | ✔ | ✔ |
| 6 | Mike Schiavo | 21 | Colonia, New Jersey | "Talking Body" | ✔ (Note: Schiavo and Levine later performed a duet of the song "She Will Be Loved.") | ✔ | — | ✔ |
| 7 | Queen Sessi | 24 | Bronx, New York | "Show Me Love" | — | — | — | — |
| 8 | Bryan Bautista | 23 | Brooklyn, New York | "The Hills" | — | — | ✔ | ✔ |
| 9 | Abby Celso | 20 | Rochester, New York | "Should've Been Us" | ✔ | ✔ | — | — |
| 10 | John Gilman | 23 | Bayville, New Jersey | "Don't Be Cruel" | ✔ | — | — | — |
| 11 | Alisan Porter | 34 | Agoura Hills, California | "Blue Bayou" | ✔ | ✔ | ✔ | ✔ |

=== Episode 2 (March 1) ===
| Order | Artist | Age | Hometown | Song | Coach's and artist's choices | | | |
| Order | Artist | Age | Hometown | Song | Adam | Pharrell | Christina | Blake |
|---|---|---|---|---|---|---|---|---|
| 1 | Joe Vivona | 27 | West Caldwell, New Jersey | "Dreaming with a Broken Heart" | ✔ | ✔ | — | ✔ |
| 2 | Shalyah Fearing | 15 | Hudson, Florida | "What Is Love" | — | — | ✔ | — |
| 3 | Adam Wakefield | 33 | Hanover, New Hampshire | "Tennessee Whiskey" | ✔ | — | — | ✔ |
| 4 | Caroline Burns | 15 | Hollis, New Hampshire | "So Far Away" | ✔ | — | — | ✔ |
| 5 | Natalie Clark | 34 | Glasgow, Scotland | "All Right Now" | — | — | — | — |
| 6 | Emily Keener | 16 | Wakeman, Ohio | "Goodbye Yellow Brick Road" | ✔ | ✔ | ✔ | ✔ |
| 7 | Laith Al-Saadi | 38 | Ann Arbor, Michigan | "The Letter" | ✔ | — | — | ✔ |
| 8 | Angie Keilhauer | 24 | Marietta, Georgia / El Salvador | "I Hold On" | ✔ | ✔ | — | ✔ |
| 9 | Lacy Mandigo | 18 | Statesville, North Carolina | "Son of a Preacher Man" | — | — | ✔ | — |
| 10 | Jonathan Bach | 20 | Ann Arbor, Michigan | "Born This Way" | — | ✔ | — | — |
| 11 | Katherine Ho | 16 | Thousand Oaks, California | "Wildest Dreams" | ✔ | — | — | ✔ |
| 12 | Theron Early | 21 | Miami, Florida | "Amazed" | — | — | — | — |
| 13 | Kata Hay | 28 | Skiatook, Oklahoma | "Redneck Woman" | ✔ | ✔ | ✔ | — |

=== Episode 3 (March 7) ===
| Order | Artist | Age | Hometown | Song | Coach's and artist's choices | | | |
| Order | Artist | Age | Hometown | Song | Adam | Pharrell | Christina | Blake |
|---|---|---|---|---|---|---|---|---|
| 1 | Hannah Huston | 24 | Lincoln, Nebraska | "Unaware" | — | ✔ | ✔ | ✔ |
| 2 | Brian Nhira | 23 | Tulsa, Oklahoma | "Happy" | — | ✔ | — | ✔ |
| 3 | Aijia Grammer | 29 | Los Angeles, California | "Say Something" | — | — | — | — |
| 4 | Brittany Kennell | 27 | Montreal, Quebec, Canada / Nashville, Tennessee | "Strong Enough" | — | ✔ | — | ✔ |
| 5 | Natalie Yacovazzi | 28 | Chicago, Illinois | "Mr. Know It All" | ✔ | — | — (Note: Christina tried to press her button, but was not able to, since the song finished beforehand.) | — |
| 6 | Malik Heard | 19 | Dallas, Texas | "Chains" | — | ✔ | ✔ | — |
| 7 | Peyton Parker | 20 | Kennesaw, Georgia | "Dreams" | — | ✔ | ✔ | ✔ |
| 8 | Gina Castanzo | 18 | West Chester, Pennsylvania | "Cecilia and the Satellite" | — | — | — | ✔ |
| 9 | Trey O'Dell | 20 | Fayetteville, Arkansas | "Geronimo" | — | — | — | ✔ |
| 10 | Kristen Marie | 20 | Oklahoma City, Oklahoma | "Mad World" | — | — | ✔ | ✔ |
| 11 | Evan Taylor Jones | 25 | Orlando, Florida | "Homegrown" | — | — | — | — |
| 12 | Nate Butler | 19 | Shamong, New Jersey | "The Walk" | ✔ | ✔ | — | ✔ |
| 13 | Ryan Quinn | 25 | Westmoreland, New York | "Can't Find My Way Home" | ✔ | ✔ | ✔ | ✔ |

=== Episode 4 (March 8) ===
| Order | Artist | Age | Hometown | Song | Coach's and artist's choices | | | |
| Order | Artist | Age | Hometown | Song | Adam | Pharrell | Christina | Blake |
|---|---|---|---|---|---|---|---|---|
| 1 | Támar Davis | 35 | Houston, Texas | "Chain of Fools" | — | — | ✔ | ✔ |
| 2 | Jessica Crosbie | 21 | Atlanta, Georgia / Cornwall, England | "Viva la Vida" | ✔ | ✔ | ✔ | — |
| 3 | Justin Whisnant | 28 | Bearden, Oklahoma | "Ain't Worth the Whiskey" | ✔ | — | — | ✔ |
| 4 | Jackie Lipson | 25 | South Windsor, Connecticut | "Ex's & Oh's" | — | — | — | — |
| 5 | Daniel Passino | 21 | New Boston, Michigan | "Marvin Gaye" | — | — | ✔ | ✔ |
| 6 | Owen Danoff | 25 | Washington, D.C. / New York, New York | "Don't Think Twice, It's All Right" | ✔ | ✔ | ✔ | ✔ |
| 7 | Maya Smith | 31 | Los Angeles, California | "Do Right Woman, Do Right Man" | — | ✔ | ✔ | — |
| 8 | Nolan Neal | 35 | Nashville, Tennessee | "Drive" | — | — | — | — |
| 9 | Brittney Lawrence | 21 | Jacksonville, Florida | "Warrior" | — | — | ✔ | ✔ |
| 10 | Teresa Guidry | 21 | Rock Hill, South Carolina | "Girl Crush" | ✔ | — | — | ✔ |
| 11 | Chelsea Gann | 27 | Liberty Mounds, Oklahoma | "Wild Angels" | — | — | ✔ | — |
| 12 | Lily Green | 16 | Brooklyn, New York | "Songbird" | ✔ | — | — | — |
| 13 | Matt Tedder | 20 | Fort Worth, Texas / Nashville, Tennessee | "I'm Your Hoochie Coochie Man" | ✔ | — | — | — |
| 14 | Joe Maye | 24 | Baltimore, Maryland | "I Put a Spell on You"* (Note: Maye and Aguilera later performed a duet of the same song after Maye's blind audition.) | — | — | ✔ | ✔ |

=== Episode 5 (March 9) ===
This episode covered the Best of the Blind Auditions and a sneak peek of the Battle Rounds.

=== Episode 6 (March 14) ===
The sixth episode included the last of the Blind Auditions as well as the first Battles; all of the coaches performed "I Wish" prior to the beginning of the Battles.

| Order | Artist | Age | Hometown | Song | Coach's and artist's choices | | | |
| Order | Artist | Age | Hometown | Song | Adam | Pharrell | Christina | Blake |
|---|---|---|---|---|---|---|---|---|
| 1 | Jared Harder | 22 | Joplin, Missouri | "Merry Go 'Round" | — | — | — | ✔ |
| 2 | Moushumi | 22 | Edison, New Jersey | "Wicked Game" | ✔ | ✔ | ✔ | Team full |
| 3 | Jake Hendershot | 29 | Muncie, Indiana | "Unchain My Heart" | — | — | — | Team full |
| 4 | Jesse Bardwell | 22 | Bozeman, Montana | "Good Hearted Woman" | — | — | — | Team full |
| 5 | Selina Carrera | 19 | Culver City, California | "Valerie" | — | — | — | Team full |
| 6 | Katie Basden | 23 | Durham, North Carolina | "Midnight Rider" | ✔ | ✔ | ✔ | Team full |
| 7 | Jonathan Hutcherson | 16 | Wilmore, Kentucky | "You & I" | Team full | ✔ | — | Team full |
| 8 | Collin Taylor | 24 | Orange, Connecticut | "Hold On, We're Going Home" | Team full | Team full | — | Team full |
| 9 | Brianna Mazzola | 15 | Palo Alto, California | "1+1" | Team full | Team full | — | Team full |
| 10 | Chase Walker | 17 | Riverside, California | "She Talks to Angels" | Team full | Team full | — | Team full |
| 11 | Ayanna Jahneé | 20 | Nashville, Tennessee | "Skyfall" | Team full | Team full | ✔ | Team full |

== The Battles ==
The Battles (second half of episode six onwards to episode nine) consisted of two 2-hour episodes, one 1-hour and one special episodes each on March 14, 15, 21 and 22, 2016. Season ten's advisors included Tori Kelly for Team Adam, Sean 'Diddy' Combs for Team Pharrell, Patti LaBelle for Team Christina, and Gwen Stefani for Team Blake. Each coach had two steals for this round.

Color key:

| Artist won the Battle and advanced to the Knockouts |
| Artist lost the Battle, but was stolen by another coach and advanced to the Knockouts |
| Artist lost the Battle and was originally eliminated, but received the Coach Comeback and advanced straight to the Live Playoffs |
| Artist lost the Battle and was eliminated |

| Episode | Coach | Order | Winner | Song | Loser | 'Steal' result | | | |
| Episode | Coach | Order | Winner | Song | Loser | Adam | Pharrell | Christina | Blake |
|---|---|---|---|---|---|---|---|---|---|
| Episode 6 (Monday, March 14, 2016) | Adam Levine | 1 | Ryan Quinn | "Maybe I'm Amazed" | Katie Basden | —N/a | — | ✔ | ✔ |
| Episode 6 (Monday, March 14, 2016) | Blake Shelton | 2 | Paxton Ingram | "I Know What You Did Last Summer" | Brittney Lawrence | — | — | — | —N/a |
| Episode 6 (Monday, March 14, 2016) | Christina Aguilera | 3 | Bryan Bautista | "It's a Man's Man's Man's World" | Malik Heard | ✔ | ✔ | —N/a | ✔ |
| Episode 7 (Tuesday, March 15, 2016) | Christina Aguilera | 1 | Támar Davis | "Lady Marmalade" | Shalyah Fearing | — | ✔ | —N/a | — |
| Episode 7 (Tuesday, March 15, 2016) | Blake Shelton | 2 | Mary Sarah | "Louisiana Woman, Mississippi Man" | Justin Whisnant | — | Team full | — | —N/a |
| Episode 7 (Tuesday, March 15, 2016) | Pharrell Williams | 3 | Nick Hagelin | "Electric Feel" | Jessica Crosbie | ✔ | Team full | — | — |
| Episode 7 (Tuesday, March 15, 2016) | Christina Aguilera | 4 | Kata Hay | "I'm the Only One" | Chelsea Gann | — | Team full | —N/a | — |
| Episode 7 (Tuesday, March 15, 2016) | Adam Levine | 5 | Nate Butler | "Hollow" | Natalie Yacovazzi | —N/a | Team full | — | — |
| Episode 7 (Tuesday, March 15, 2016) | Pharrell Williams | 6 | Hannah Huston | "Elastic Heart" | Maya Smith | — | Team full | ✔ | ✔ |
| Episode 8 (Monday, March 21, 2016) | Blake Shelton | 1 | Adam Wakefield | "Can't You See" | Jared Harder | — | Team full | — | —N/a |
| Episode 8 (Monday, March 21, 2016) | Pharrell Williams | 2 | Emily Keener | "Explosions" | Jonathan Bach | — | Team full | — | — |
| Episode 8 (Monday, March 21, 2016) | Christina Aguilera | 3 | Daniel Passino | "Turning Tables" | Kristen Marie | — | Team full | —N/a | — |
| Episode 8 (Monday, March 21, 2016) | Pharrell Williams | 4 | Moushumi | "Photograph" | Jonathan Hutcherson | — | Team full | — | — |
| Episode 8 (Monday, March 21, 2016) | Adam Levine | 5 | Katherine Ho | "Lovefool" | Lily Green | —N/a | Team full | — | — |
| Episode 8 (Monday, March 21, 2016) | Blake Shelton | 6 | Angie Keilhauer | "Backseat of a Greyhound Bus" | Teresa Guidry | — | Team full | — | —N/a |
| Episode 8 (Monday, March 21, 2016) | Pharrell Williams | 7 | Abby Celso | "Sugar" | Brian Nhira | ✔ | Team full | ✔ | — |
| Episode 8 (Monday, March 21, 2016) | Adam Levine | 8 | Caroline Burns | "Like I'm Gonna Lose You" | Mike Schiavo | Team full | Team full | — | — |
| Episode 8 (Monday, March 21, 2016) | Christina Aguilera | 9 | Alisan Porter | "California Dreamin'" | Lacy Mandigo | Team full | Team full | —N/a | ✔ |
| Episode 9 (Tuesday, March 22, 2016) | Adam Levine | 1 | Laith Al-Saadi | "Honky Tonk Women" | Matt Tedder | Team full | Team full | — | Team full |
| Episode 9 (Tuesday, March 22, 2016) | Pharrell Williams | 2 | Caity Peters | "Honesty" | Joe Vivona | Team full | Team full | — | Team full |
| Episode 9 (Tuesday, March 22, 2016) | Blake Shelton | 3 | Peyton Parker | "Borderline" | Gina Castanzo | Team full | Team full | — | Team full |
| Episode 9 (Tuesday, March 22, 2016) | Christina Aguilera | 4 | Joe Maye | "I Knew You Were Waiting (For Me)" | Ayanna Jahnee | Team full | Team full | —N/a | Team full |
| Episode 9 (Tuesday, March 22, 2016) | Adam Levine | 5 | Owen Danoff | "Runaway" | John Gilman | Team full | Team full | — | Team full |
| Episode 9 (Tuesday, March 22, 2016) | Blake Shelton | 6 | Brittany Kennell | "The Chain" | Trey O'Dell | Team full | Team full | ✔ | Team full |

== The Knockouts ==
For the Knockouts, Miley Cyrus was assigned as a mentor for contestants in all four teams. The coaches can each steal one losing artist. The top 20 contestants, plus four receiving the Coach Comeback from either the Knockouts or the earlier Battles, will then move on to the "Live Shows."

Color key:

| Artist won the Knockout and advanced to the Live Playoffs |
| Artist lost the Knockout, but was stolen by another coach and advanced to the Live Playoffs |
| Artist lost the Knockout and was originally eliminated, but received the Coach Comeback and advanced to the Live Playoffs |
| Artist lost the Knockout and was eliminated |

| Episode | Coach | Order | Song | Artists | | Song | 'Steal' result | | | |
| Episode | Coach | Order | Song | Winner | Loser | Song | Adam | Pharrell | Christina | Blake |
|---|---|---|---|---|---|---|---|---|---|---|
| Episode 10 (Monday, March 28, 2016) | Blake Shelton | 1 | "Hometown Glory" | Paxton Ingram | Angie Keilhauer | "Take Your Time" | — | — | — | —N/a |
| Episode 10 (Monday, March 28, 2016) | Adam Levine | 2 | "She's Always a Woman" | Owen Danoff | Ryan Quinn | "Drops of Jupiter" | —N/a | — | ✔ | — |
| Episode 10 (Monday, March 28, 2016) | Pharrell Williams | 3 | "House of the Rising Sun" | Hannah Huston | Malik Heard | "Isn't She Lovely" | — | —N/a | Team full | — |
| Episode 10 (Monday, March 28, 2016) | Blake Shelton | 4 | "Gypsy" | Katie Basden | Lacy Mandigo | "Zombie" | ✔ | ✔ | Team full | —N/a |
| Episode 10 (Monday, March 28, 2016) | Christina Aguilera | 5 | "River" | Alisan Porter | Daniel Passino _{1} | "Ain't Too Proud to Beg" | — | Team full | Team full | — |
| Episode 10 (Monday, March 28, 2016) | Pharrell Williams | 6 | "Big Yellow Taxi" | Emily Keener | Shalyah Fearing | "A Broken Wing" | ✔ | Team full | Team full | — |
| Episode 11 (Tuesday, March 29, 2016) | Blake Shelton | 1 | "Bring It On Home to Me" | Adam Wakefield | Peyton Parker | "Travelin' Soldier" | Team full | Team full | Team full | —N/a |
| Episode 11 (Tuesday, March 29, 2016) | Pharrell Williams | 2 | "New Americana" | Moushumi | Nick Hagelin _{2} | "Lost Without U" | Team full | Team full | Team full | — |
| Episode 11 (Tuesday, March 29, 2016) | Christina Aguilera | 3 | "Lay Me Down" | Támar Davis | Maya Smith | "No One" | Team full | Team full | Team full | — |
| Episode 12 (Monday, April 4, 2016) | Adam Levine | 1 | "Grenade" | Brian Nhira | Nate Butler | "Let's Stay Together" | Team full | Team full | Team full | — |
| Episode 12 (Monday, April 4, 2016) | Blake Shelton | 2 | "You Ain't Woman Enough (To Take My Man)" | Mary Sarah | Brittany Kennell | "You're Still The One" | Team full | Team full | Team full | —N/a |
| Episode 12 (Monday, April 4, 2016) | Christina Aguilera | 3 | "Sorry" | Bryan Bautista | Trey O'Dell | "I Lived" | Team full | Team full | Team full | — |
| Episode 12 (Monday, April 4, 2016) | Pharrell Williams | 4 | "Leave Your Lover" | Caity Peters | Abby Celso | "Rich Girl" | Team full | Team full | Team full | — |
| Episode 12 (Monday, April 4, 2016) | Adam Levine | 5 | "In Your Eyes" | Laith Al-Saadi | Jessica Crosbie | "Wake Me Up" | Team full | Team full | Team full | — |
| Episode 12 (Monday, April 4, 2016) | Adam Levine | 6 | "Human" | Caroline Burns | Katherine Ho | "Realize" | Team full | Team full | Team full | — |
| Episode 12 (Monday, April 4, 2016) | Christina Aguilera | 7 | "Why Haven't I Heard from You" | Kata Hay | Joe Maye | "Earned It (Fifty Shades of Grey)" | Team full | Team full | Team full | ✔ |
| Episode 13 (Tuesday, April 5, 2016) | The thirteenth episode was a special one-hour episode titled "The Road to the Live Shows." The episode presented the "best moments of the season so far", including the blind auditions, the journey of the top 20 contestants and some unseen footage. | | | | | | | | | |

_{1} Daniel Passino is on Team Pharrell for the Live Shows
_{2} Nick Hagelin is on Team Christina for the Live Shows

== Live shows ==
The Live Shows are the final phase of the competition, consisting of seven weeks of shows beginning with the playoffs and a live finale.

Color key:

| Artist was saved by the Public's votes |
| Artist was saved by his/her coach or placed in the bottom two, or middle three |
| Artist was saved by the Instant Save |
| Artist's iTunes vote multiplied by 10 after his/her studio version of the song reached iTunes top 10 |
| Artist was eliminated |

=== Week 1: Live Playoffs (April 11, 12 & 13) ===
The Live Playoffs comprised episodes 14, 15, and 16. 24 artists perform for a public vote; the top two artists per each team advances via public vote, while the bottom four artists compete for the coaches' save in the results show. The Monday night broadcast featured Teams Blake and Christina, the Tuesday night broadcast featured Teams Adam and Pharrell, and the Wednesday night broadcast featured the results.

| Episode | Coach | Order | Artist | Song | Result |
|---|---|---|---|---|---|
| Episode 14 (Monday, April 11, 2016) | Blake Shelton | 1 | Paxton Ingram | "How Deep Is Your Love" | Blake's choice |
| Episode 14 (Monday, April 11, 2016) | Christina Aguilera | 2 | Ryan Quinn | "I'm Not the Only One" | Eliminated |
| Episode 14 (Monday, April 11, 2016) | Blake Shelton | 3 | Katie Basden | "Georgia Rain" | Eliminated |
| Episode 14 (Monday, April 11, 2016) | Christina Aguilera | 4 | Kata Hay | "(You Make Me Feel Like) A Natural Woman" | Eliminated |
| Episode 14 (Monday, April 11, 2016) | Christina Aguilera | 5 | Nick Hagelin | "Stay" | Public's vote |
| Episode 14 (Monday, April 11, 2016) | Blake Shelton | 6 | Joe Maye | "Long Train Runnin'" | Eliminated |
| Episode 14 (Monday, April 11, 2016) | Blake Shelton | 7 | Adam Wakefield | "Seven Spanish Angels" | Public's vote |
| Episode 14 (Monday, April 11, 2016) | Christina Aguilera | 8 | Támar Davis | "Rise Up" | Eliminated |
| Episode 14 (Monday, April 11, 2016) | Blake Shelton | 9 | Mary Sarah | "(I Never Promised You A) Rose Garden" | Public's vote |
| Episode 14 (Monday, April 11, 2016) | Christina Aguilera | 10 | Bryan Bautista | "Pillowtalk" | Christina's choice |
| Episode 14 (Monday, April 11, 2016) | Blake Shelton | 11 | Justin Whisnant | "Here's a Quarter (Call Someone Who Cares)" | Eliminated |
| Episode 14 (Monday, April 11, 2016) | Christina Aguilera | 12 | Alisan Porter | "Cry Baby" | Public's vote |
| Episode 15 (Tuesday, April 12, 2016) | Pharrell Williams | 1 | Daniel Passino | "When I Was Your Man" | Public's vote |
| Episode 15 (Tuesday, April 12, 2016) | Pharrell Williams | 2 | Emily Keener | "Still Crazy After All These Years" | Pharrell's choice |
| Episode 15 (Tuesday, April 12, 2016) | Adam Levine | 3 | Laith Al-Saadi | "With a Little Help from My Friends" | Public's vote |
| Episode 15 (Tuesday, April 12, 2016) | Pharrell Williams | 4 | Moushumi | "Love Yourself" | Eliminated |
| Episode 15 (Tuesday, April 12, 2016) | Pharrell Williams | 5 | Lacy Mandigo | "Love Is a Battlefield" | Eliminated |
| Episode 15 (Tuesday, April 12, 2016) | Adam Levine | 6 | Owen Danoff | "Hero" | Adam's choice |
| Episode 15 (Tuesday, April 12, 2016) | Adam Levine | 7 | Shalyah Fearing | "Listen" | Public's vote |
| Episode 15 (Tuesday, April 12, 2016) | Adam Levine | 8 | Nate Butler | "Sara Smile" | Eliminated |
| Episode 15 (Tuesday, April 12, 2016) | Pharrell Williams | 9 | Caity Peters | "I'll Be Waiting" | Eliminated |
| Episode 15 (Tuesday, April 12, 2016) | Adam Levine | 10 | Caroline Burns | "All I Want" | Eliminated |
| Episode 15 (Tuesday, April 12, 2016) | Adam Levine | 11 | Brian Nhira | "Alive" | Eliminated |
| Episode 15 (Tuesday, April 12, 2016) | Pharrell Williams | 12 | Hannah Huston | "Ain't No Way" | Public's vote |

Non-competition performances
| Order | Performer | Song |
|---|---|---|
| 16.1 | Team Pharrell (Hannah Huston, Emily Keener, Lacy Mandigo, Moushumi, Daniel Passino and Caity Peters) | "Don't You Worry Child" |
| 16.2 | Jordan Smith | "Stand in the Light" |
| 16.3 | Team Blake (Katie Basden, Paxton Ingram, Joe Maye, Mary Sarah, Adam Wakefield and Justin Whisnant) | "Hey Brother" |
| 16.4 | Team Christina (Bryan Bautista, Támar Davis, Nick Hagelin, Kata Hay, Alisan Porter and Ryan Quinn) | "Stars" |
| 16.5 | Team Adam (Laith Al-Saadi, Caroline Burns, Nate Butler, Owen Danoff, Shalyah Fearing and Brian Nhira) | "Your Song" |

=== Week 2: Top 12 (April 18 & 19) ===
From weeks two to five, two artists with the fewest votes compete for an Instant Save, with one leaving the competition each week until the semifinals. iTunes bonus multipliers were awarded to Adam Wakefield (#7) and Alisan Porter (#9).

| Episode | Coach | Order | Artist | Song | Result |
|---|---|---|---|---|---|
| Episode 17 (Monday, April 18, 2016) | Blake Shelton | 1 | Mary Sarah | "So Small" | Public's vote |
| Episode 17 (Monday, April 18, 2016) | Adam Levine | 2 | Laith Al-Saadi | "Born Under a Bad Sign" | Public's vote |
| Episode 17 (Monday, April 18, 2016) | Pharrell Williams | 3 | Daniel Passino | "Human Nature" | Public's vote |
| Episode 17 (Monday, April 18, 2016) | Pharrell Williams | 4 | Emily Keener | "Lilac Wine" | Bottom two |
| Episode 17 (Monday, April 18, 2016) | Christina Aguilera | 5 | Nick Hagelin | "Mine Would Be You" | Public's vote |
| Episode 17 (Monday, April 18, 2016) | Blake Shelton | 6 | Adam Wakefield | "Soulshine" | Public's vote |
| Episode 17 (Monday, April 18, 2016) | Christina Aguilera | 7 | Bryan Bautista | "Kiss from a Rose" | Public's vote |
| Episode 17 (Monday, April 18, 2016) | Adam Levine | 8 | Owen Danoff | "7 Years" | Bottom two |
| Episode 17 (Monday, April 18, 2016) | Christina Aguilera | 9 | Alisan Porter | "Stone Cold" | Public's vote |
| Episode 17 (Monday, April 18, 2016) | Blake Shelton | 10 | Paxton Ingram | "Hands to Myself" | Public's vote |
| Episode 17 (Monday, April 18, 2016) | Pharrell Williams | 11 | Hannah Huston | "Something's Got a Hold on Me" | Public's vote |
| Episode 17 (Monday, April 18, 2016) | Adam Levine | 12 | Shalyah Fearing | "Up to the Mountain" | Public's vote |
Episode 18 (Tuesday, April 19, 2016)
| Episode 18 (Tuesday, April 19, 2016) | Instant Save performances | | | | |
| Episode 18 (Tuesday, April 19, 2016) | Pharrell Williams | 1 | Emily Keener | "Blue Eyes Crying in the Rain" | Eliminated |
| Episode 18 (Tuesday, April 19, 2016) | Adam Levine | 2 | Owen Danoff | "Lego House" | Instant Save |

Non-competition performances
| Order | Performer | Song |
|---|---|---|
| 18.1 | Gwen Stefani | "Misery" |
| 18.2 | Blake Shelton and his team (Paxton Ingram, Mary Sarah and Adam Wakefield) | "I Love a Rainy Night" |
| 18.3 | Adam Levine and his team (Laith Al-Saadi, Owen Danoff, and Shalyah Fearing) | "If You Want Me to Stay" |

=== Week 3: Top 11 (April 25 & 26) ===
None of the artists reached the top 10 on iTunes, so no bonuses were awarded.

| Episode | Coach | Order | Artist | Song | Result |
|---|---|---|---|---|---|
| Episode 19 (Monday, April 25, 2016) | Adam Levine | 1 | Shalyah Fearing | "The Climb" | Public's vote |
| Episode 19 (Monday, April 25, 2016) | Pharrell Williams | 2 | Daniel Passino | "Time After Time" | Bottom two |
| Episode 19 (Monday, April 25, 2016) | Blake Shelton | 3 | Paxton Ingram | "Break Every Chain" | Public's vote |
| Episode 19 (Monday, April 25, 2016) | Adam Levine | 4 | Owen Danoff | "Fire and Rain" | Bottom two |
| Episode 19 (Monday, April 25, 2016) | Blake Shelton | 5 | Mary Sarah | "Johnny and June" | Public's vote |
| Episode 19 (Monday, April 25, 2016) | Christina Aguilera | 6 | Alisan Porter | "Stay With Me Baby" | Public's vote |
| Episode 19 (Monday, April 25, 2016) | Christina Aguilera | 7 | Bryan Bautista | "Just the Way You Are" | Public's vote |
| Episode 19 (Monday, April 25, 2016) | Blake Shelton | 8 | Adam Wakefield | "Lights" | Public's vote |
| Episode 19 (Monday, April 25, 2016) | Christina Aguilera | 9 | Nick Hagelin | "Your Body Is a Wonderland" | Public's vote |
| Episode 19 (Monday, April 25, 2016) | Pharrell Williams | 10 | Hannah Huston | "I Can't Make You Love Me" | Public's vote |
| Episode 19 (Monday, April 25, 2016) | Adam Levine | 11 | Laith Al-Saadi | "Make It Rain" | Public's vote |
Episode 20 (Tuesday, April 26, 2016)
| Episode 20 (Tuesday, April 26, 2016) | Instant Save performances | | | | |
| Episode 20 (Tuesday, April 26, 2016) | Pharrell Williams | 1 | Daniel Passino | "Jealous" | Instant Save |
| Episode 20 (Tuesday, April 26, 2016) | Adam Levine | 2 | Owen Danoff | "Burning House" | Eliminated |

Non-competition performances
| Order | Performer | Song |
|---|---|---|
| 20.1 | Thomas Rhett | "T-Shirt" |
| 20.2 | Pharrell Williams and his team (Hannah Huston and Daniel Passino) | "Let Love Rule" |
| 20.3 | Christina Aguilera and her team (Bryan Bautista, Nick Hagelin and Alisan Porter) | "Live and Let Die" |

=== Week 4: Top 10 (May 2 & 3) ===
iTunes bonus multiplier was awarded to Porter (#6).

| Episode | Coach | Order | Artist | Song | Result |
|---|---|---|---|---|---|
| Episode 21 (Monday, May 2, 2016) | Pharrell Williams | 1 | Daniel Passino | "I Don't Want to Miss a Thing" | Bottom two |
| Episode 21 (Monday, May 2, 2016) | Adam Levine | 2 | Shalyah Fearing | "My Kind of Love" | Public's vote |
| Episode 21 (Monday, May 2, 2016) | Christina Aguilera | 3 | Nick Hagelin | "I Can't Help It" | Bottom two |
| Episode 21 (Monday, May 2, 2016) | Pharrell Williams | 4 | Hannah Huston | "Rolling in the Deep" | Public's vote |
| Episode 21 (Monday, May 2, 2016) | Adam Levine | 5 | Laith Al-Saadi | "The Thrill Is Gone" | Public's vote |
| Episode 21 (Monday, May 2, 2016) | Blake Shelton | 6 | Paxton Ingram | "It's All Coming Back to Me Now" | Public's vote |
| Episode 21 (Monday, May 2, 2016) | Blake Shelton | 7 | Mary Sarah | "Stand By Your Man" | Public's vote |
| Episode 21 (Monday, May 2, 2016) | Christina Aguilera | 8 | Bryan Bautista | "Promise" | Public's vote |
| Episode 21 (Monday, May 2, 2016) | Christina Aguilera | 9 | Alisan Porter | "Let Him Fly" | Public's vote |
| Episode 21 (Monday, May 2, 2016) | Blake Shelton | 10 | Adam Wakefield | "I Got a Woman" | Public's vote |
Episode 22 (Tuesday, May 3, 2016)
| Episode 22 (Tuesday, May 3, 2016) | Instant Save performances | | | | |
| Episode 22 (Tuesday, May 3, 2016) | Christina Aguilera | 1 | Nick Hagelin | "Thinking Out Loud" | Instant Save |
| Episode 22 (Tuesday, May 3, 2016) | Pharrell Williams | 2 | Daniel Passino | "Uptown Funk" | Eliminated |

Non-competition performances
| Order | Performer | Song |
|---|---|---|
| 21.1 | Top 10 | "Home" |
| 22.1 | DNCE | "Toothbrush/Cake by the Ocean" |
| 22.2 | Sawyer Fredericks | "4 Pockets" |

=== Week 5: Top 9 (May 9 & 10) ===
iTunes bonus multipliers were awarded to Wakefield (#9) and Laith Al-Saadi (#10). This week's Instant Save was the second closest in the show's history, with Paxton and Nick tied for most of the voting window; Paxton was saved with a difference of nearly 100 votes.

| Episode | Coach | Order | Artist | Song | Result |
|---|---|---|---|---|---|
| Episode 23 (Monday, May 9, 2016) | Blake Shelton | 1 | Paxton Ingram | "I Wanna Dance with Somebody (Who Loves Me)" | Bottom two |
| Episode 23 (Monday, May 9, 2016) | Blake Shelton | 2 | Mary Sarah | "My Church" | Public's vote |
| Episode 23 (Monday, May 9, 2016) | Christina Aguilera | 3 | Nick Hagelin | "Hold On, We're Going Home" | Bottom two |
| Episode 23 (Monday, May 9, 2016) | Pharrell Williams | 4 | Hannah Huston | "Say You Love Me" | Public's vote |
| Episode 23 (Monday, May 9, 2016) | Adam Levine | 5 | Shalyah Fearing | "A Change Is Gonna Come" | Public's vote |
| Episode 23 (Monday, May 9, 2016) | Adam Levine | 6 | Laith Al-Saadi | "We've Got Tonight" | Public's vote |
| Episode 23 (Monday, May 9, 2016) | Blake Shelton | 7 | Adam Wakefield | "Love Has No Pride" | Public's vote |
| Episode 23 (Monday, May 9, 2016) | Christina Aguilera | 8 | Alisan Porter | "Cryin'" | Public's vote |
| Episode 23 (Monday, May 9, 2016) | Christina Aguilera | 9 | Bryan Bautista | "1+1" | Public's vote |
Episode 24 (Tuesday, May 10, 2016)
| Episode 24 (Tuesday, May 10, 2016) | Instant Save performances | | | | |
| Episode 24 (Tuesday, May 10, 2016) | Blake Shelton | 1 | Paxton Ingram | "How Will I Know" | Instant Save |
| Episode 24 (Tuesday, May 10, 2016) | Christina Aguilera | 2 | Nick Hagelin | "Change the World" | Eliminated |

Non-competition performances
| Order | Performer | Song |
|---|---|---|
| 23.1 | Florida Georgia Line | "H.O.L.Y." |
| 23.2 | Blake Shelton and Gwen Stefani | "Go Ahead and Break My Heart" |
| 24.1 | James Bay | "Let It Go" |
| 24.2 | Andy Samberg and Adam Levine | "I'm So Humble" |

=== Week 6: Semifinals (May 16 & 17) ===
Four artists were eliminated on the semifinals. During the results, the top three artists with the most votes were immediately advanced the finals, the bottom two artists with the fewest votes were eliminated immediately, and the middle three artists were eligible for the Instant Save. In addition to their individual songs, each artist performed a duet with another artist in the competition, though these duets were not available for purchase on iTunes. iTunes bonus multipliers were awarded to Wakefield (#2), Porter (#3), Hannah Huston (#5), Mary Sarah (#6), Bryan Bautista (#7) and Al-Saadi (#10). All four coaches had an artist advance to the finals for the first time ever since season 1 and season 2 (which was team-based rather than individual), thus becoming the first season in The Voice history to achieve this distinction organically. Pink served as a mentor for the semifinalists on all four teams.

| Episode | Coach | Order | Artist | Solo Song | Duet Song | Result |
|---|---|---|---|---|---|---|
| Episode 25 (Monday, May 16, 2016) | Adam Levine | 1 (10) | Shalyah Fearing | "And I Am Telling You I'm Not Going" | "Masterpiece" | Eliminated |
| Episode 25 (Monday, May 16, 2016) | Blake Shelton | 3 (10) | Paxton Ingram | "I'd Do Anything For Love (But I Won't Do That)" | "Masterpiece" | Eliminated |
| Episode 25 (Monday, May 16, 2016) | Adam Levine | 4 (7) | Laith Al-Saadi | "One and Only" | "Knock on Wood" | Middle three |
| Episode 25 (Monday, May 16, 2016) | Christina Aguilera | 6 (2) | Alisan Porter | "Desperado" | "Angel from Montgomery" | Public's vote |
| Episode 25 (Monday, May 16, 2016) | Blake Shelton | 8 (2) | Adam Wakefield | "I'm Sorry" | "Angel from Montgomery" | Public's vote |
| Episode 25 (Monday, May 16, 2016) | Christina Aguilera | 9 (5) | Bryan Bautista | "Hurt" | "Break Free" | Middle three |
| Episode 25 (Monday, May 16, 2016) | Blake Shelton | 11 (5) | Mary Sarah | "I Told You So" | "Break Free" | Middle three |
| Episode 25 (Monday, May 16, 2016) | Pharrell Williams | 12 (7) | Hannah Huston | "When a Man Loves a Woman" | "Knock on Wood" | Public's vote |
Episode 26 (Tuesday, May 17, 2016)
| Episode 26 (Tuesday, May 17, 2016) | Instant Save performances | | | | | |
| Episode 26 (Tuesday, May 17, 2016) | Blake Shelton | 1 | Mary Sarah | "Something in the Water" | | Eliminated |
| Episode 26 (Tuesday, May 17, 2016) | Christina Aguilera | 2 | Bryan Bautista | "Adorn" | | Eliminated |
| Episode 26 (Tuesday, May 17, 2016) | Adam Levine | 3 | Laith Al-Saadi | "All Along the Watchtower" | | Instant Save |

Non-competition performances
| Order | Performer | Song |
|---|---|---|
| 26.1 | Alicia Keys | "In Common" |
| 26.2 | OneRepublic | "Wherever I Go" |

=== Week 7: Finale (May 23 & 24) ===
The Top four performed on Monday, May 23, 2016, with the final results following on Tuesday, May 24, 2016. Finalists performed a solo song, a duet with their coach, and an original song. In a change from the previous seasons, iTunes bonus multipliers were extended to songs performed in the final performance show. iTunes bonus multipliers were awarded to Wakefield (#1 and #9), Huston (#3 and #7), Porter (#4 and #5) and Al-Saadi (#6). All iTunes votes received for the six weeks leading up to the finale were cumulatively added to online and app finale votes for each finalist.

| Coach | Artist | Order | Solo Song | Order | Duet Song (With coach) | Order | Original Song | Result |
|---|---|---|---|---|---|---|---|---|
| Adam Levine | Laith Al-Saadi | 1 | "White Room" | 5 | "Golden Slumbers/Carry That Weight/The End" | 9 | "Morning Light" | Fourth place |
| Christina Aguilera | Alisan Porter | 12 | "Somewhere" | 6 | "You've Got a Friend" | 2 | "Down That Road" | Winner |
| Blake Shelton | Adam Wakefield | 10 | "When I Call Your Name" | 3 | "The Conversation" | 7 | "Lonesome Broken and Blue" | Runner-up |
| Pharrell Williams | Hannah Huston | 4 | "Every Breath You Take" | 8 | "Brand New" | 11 | "I Call the Shots" | Third place |

Non-competition performances
| Order | Performer | Song |
|---|---|---|
| 28.1 | Little Big Town | "One of Those Days" |
| 28.2 | CeeLo Green and Hannah Huston | "Crazy" |
| 28.3 | Alisan Porter (with Kata Hay, Paxton Ingram and Ryan Quinn) | "Straight On" |
| 28.4 | Joe Walsh and Laith Al-Saadi | "Rocky Mountain Way" |
| 28.5 | Sia | "Cheap Thrills" |
| 28.6 | Alison Krauss and Adam Wakefield | "Willin'" |
| 28.7 | Hannah Huston (with Bryan Bautista, Brian Nhira and Caity Peters) | "When We Were Young" |
| 28.8 | Zayn | "Like I Would" |
| 28.9 | Blake Shelton | "She's Got a Way with Words" |
| 28.10 | Laith Al-Saadi (with Katie Basden and Shalyah Fearing)^{*} | "Georgia on My Mind" |
| 28.11 | Jennifer Nettles and Alisan Porter | "Unlove You" |
| 28.12 | Adam Wakefield (with Nick Hagelin, Mary Sarah and Justin Whisnant) | "Gimme Some Lovin'" |
| 28.13 | Ariana Grande and Christina Aguilera | "Into You / Dangerous Woman" |
| 28.14 | Alisan Porter (winner) | "Down That Road" |

- Originally, Owen Danoff was among the artists recruited by Al-Saadi for his performance prior to Danoff's absence.

== Elimination chart ==
=== Overall ===
Color key
Artist's info

- Team Adam
- Team Pharrell
- Team Christina
- Team Blake

Result details

- Winner
- Runner-up
- Third place
- Fourth place
- Saved by Instant Save (via Twitter)
- Artist was saved by the public
- Artist was saved by his/her coach
- Artist was eliminated

Live show results per week
| Artist | Week 1 Playoffs | Week 2 | Week 3 | Week 4 | Week 5 | Week 6 | Week 7 Finale |
|---|---|---|---|---|---|---|---|
| Alisan Porter | Safe | Safe | Safe | Safe | Safe | Safe | Winner |
| Adam Wakefield | Safe | Safe | Safe | Safe | Safe | Safe | Runner-up |
| Hannah Huston | Safe | Safe | Safe | Safe | Safe | Safe | 3rd place |
| Laith Al-Saadi | Safe | Safe | Safe | Safe | Safe | Safe | 4th place |
| Mary Sarah | Safe | Safe | Safe | Safe | Safe | Eliminated | Eliminated (Week 6) |
| Bryan Bautista | Safe | Safe | Safe | Safe | Safe | Eliminated | Eliminated (Week 6) |
| Shalyah Fearing | Safe | Safe | Safe | Safe | Safe | Eliminated | Eliminated (Week 6) |
| Paxton Ingram | Safe | Safe | Safe | Safe | Safe | Eliminated | Eliminated (Week 6) |
| Nick Hagelin | Safe | Safe | Safe | Safe | Eliminated | Eliminated (Week 5) | |
| Daniel Passino | Safe | Safe | Safe | Eliminated | Eliminated (Week 4) | | |
| Owen Danoff | Safe | Safe | Eliminated | Eliminated (Week 3) | | | |
| Emily Keener | Safe | Eliminated | Eliminated (Week 2) | | | | |
| Katie Basden | Eliminated | Eliminated (Week 1) | | | | | |
| Caroline Burns | Eliminated | Eliminated (Week 1) | | | | | |
| Nate Butler | Eliminated | Eliminated (Week 1) | | | | | |
| Támar Davis | Eliminated | Eliminated (Week 1) | | | | | |
| Kata Hay | Eliminated | Eliminated (Week 1) | | | | | |
| Lacy Mandigo | Eliminated | Eliminated (Week 1) | | | | | |
| Joe Maye | Eliminated | Eliminated (Week 1) | | | | | |
| Moushumi | Eliminated | Eliminated (Week 1) | | | | | |
| Brian Nhira | Eliminated | Eliminated (Week 1) | | | | | |
| Caity Peters | Eliminated | Eliminated (Week 1) | | | | | |
| Ryan Quinn | Eliminated | Eliminated (Week 1) | | | | | |
| Justin Whisnant | Eliminated | Eliminated (Week 1) | | | | | |

=== Team ===
Color key
Artist's info

- Team Adam
- Team Pharrell
- Team Christina
- Team Blake

Result details

- Winner
- Runner-up
- Third place
- Fourth Place
- Eliminated
- Artist Saved by Instant Save (via Twitter)
- Artist received one or more iTunes bonus that week
- Number of iTunes bonuses received
- Teams are in 3 artists
- No artists remaining on his/her team

| Artist | Week 1 Playoffs | Week 2 | Week 3 | Week 4 | Week 5 | Week 6 | Week 7 Finale |
|---|---|---|---|---|---|---|---|
| Laith Al-Saadi | Public's vote | Advanced | Advanced | Advanced | Advanced | Advanced | Fourth place |
| Shalyah Fearing | Public's vote | Advanced | Advanced | Advanced | Advanced | Eliminated | |
| Owen Danoff | Coach's Choice | Advanced | Eliminated | | | | |
| Caroline Burns | Eliminated | | | | | | |
| Nate Butler | Eliminated | | | | | | |
| Brian Nhira | Eliminated | | | | | | |
| Hannah Huston | Public's vote | Advanced | Advanced | Advanced | Advanced | Advanced | Third place |
| Daniel Passino | Public's vote | Advanced | Advanced | Eliminated | | | |
| Emily Keener | Coach's Choice | Eliminated | | | | | |
| Lacy Mandigo | Eliminated | | | | | | |
| Moushumi | Eliminated | | | | | | |
| Caity Peters | Eliminated | | | | | | |
| Alisan Porter | Public's vote | Advanced | Advanced | Advanced | Advanced | Advanced | Winner |
| Bryan Bautista | Coach's Choice | Advanced | Advanced | Advanced | Advanced | Eliminated | |
| Nick Hagelin | Public's vote | Advanced | Advanced | Advanced | Eliminated | | |
| Támar Davis | Eliminated | | | | | | |
| Kata Hay | Eliminated | | | | | | |
| Ryan Quinn | Eliminated | | | | | | |
| Adam Wakefield | Public's vote | Advanced | Advanced | Advanced | Advanced | Advanced | Runner-up |
| Mary Sarah | Public's vote | Advanced | Advanced | Advanced | Advanced | Eliminated | |
| Paxton Ingram | Coach's Choice | Advanced | Advanced | Advanced | Advanced | Eliminated | |
| Katie Basden | Eliminated | | | | | | |
| Joe Maye | Eliminated | | | | | | |
| Justin Whisnant | Eliminated | | | | | | |

| Rank | Coach | Top 12 | Top 11 | Top 10 | Top 9 | Top 8 | Top 6 | Top 4 |
|---|---|---|---|---|---|---|---|---|
| 1 | Christina Aguilera | 3 | 3 | 3 | 3 | 2 | 2 | 1 |
| 2 | Blake Shelton | 3 | 3 | 3 | 3 | 3 | 2 | 1 |
| 3 | Pharrell Williams | 3 | 2 | 2 | 1 | 1 | 1 | 1 |
| 4 | Adam Levine | 3 | 3 | 2 | 2 | 2 | 1 | 1 |

== Ratings ==
| Episode | | Original airdate | Production | Time slot (ET) | Viewers (in millions) | Adults (18–49) | | Source |
| Episode | | Original airdate | Production | Time slot (ET) | Viewers (in millions) | Rating | Share | Source |
|---|---|---|---|---|---|---|---|---|
| 1 | "The Blind Auditions Premiere, Part 1" | February 29, 2016 | 1001 | Monday 8:00 p.m. | 13.33 | 3.4 | 11 | |
| 2 | "The Blind Auditions Premiere, Part 2" | March 1, 2016 | 1002 | Tuesday 8:00 p.m. | 12.29 | 3.0 | 10 | |
| 3 | "The Blind Auditions, Part 3" | March 7, 2016 | 1003 | Monday 8:00 p.m. | 13.45 | 3.2 | 10 | |
| 4 | "The Blind Auditions, Part 4" | March 8, 2016 | 1004 | Tuesday 8:00 p.m. | 13.53 | 3.1 | 10 | |
| 5 | "Best of The Blind Auditions" | March 9, 2016 | 1005 | Wednesday 8:00 p.m. | 9.18 | 2.0 | 7 | |
| 6 | "The Blinds End and the Battles Begin" | March 14, 2016 | 1006 | Monday 8:00 p.m. | 12.47 | 3.0 | 10 | |
| 7 | "The Battles Premiere, Part 2" | March 15, 2016 | 1007 | Tuesday 8:00 p.m. | 11.19 | 2.7 | 9 | |
| 8 | "The Battles, Part 3" | March 21, 2016 | 1008 | Monday 8:00 p.m. | 11.22 | 2.8 | 9 | |
| 9 | "The Battles, Part 4" | March 22, 2016 | 1009 | Tuesday 8:00 p.m. | 10.76 | 2.5 | 9 | |
| 10 | "The Knockouts Premiere, Part 1" | March 28, 2016 | 1010 | Monday 8:00 p.m. | 11.38 | 2.8 | 9 | |
| 11 | "The Knockouts Premiere, Part 2" | March 29, 2016 | 1011 | Tuesday 8:00 p.m. | 11.10 | 2.4 | 8 | |
| 12 | "The Knockouts, Part 3" | April 4, 2016 | 1012 | Monday 8:00 p.m. | 10.43 | 2.5 | 8 | |
| 13 | "The Road to the Live Shows" | April 5, 2016 | 1013 | Tuesday 8:00 p.m. | 6.72 | 1.4 | 5 | |
| 14 | "The Live Playoffs, Night 1" | April 11, 2016 | 1014 | Monday 8:00 p.m. | 10.41 | 2.3 | 7 | |
| 15 | "The Live Playoffs, Night 2" | April 12, 2016 | 1015 | Tuesday 8:00 p.m. | 10.81 | 2.3 | 8 | |
| 16 | "The Live Playoffs, Results" | April 13, 2016 | 1016 | Wednesday 8:00 p.m. | 8.88 | 1.7 | 6 | |
| 17 | "Live Top 12 Performance" | April 18, 2016 | 1017 | Monday 8:00 p.m. | 10.07 | 2.2 | 7 | |
| 18 | "Live Top 12 Results" | April 19, 2016 | 1017 | Tuesday 8:00 p.m. | 9.79 | 1.8 | 7 | |
| 19 | "Live Top 11 Performance" | April 25, 2016 | 1019 | Monday 8:00 p.m. | 9.49 | 2.0 | 7 | |
| 20 | "Live Top 11 Results" | April 26, 2016 | 1020 | Tuesday 8:00 p.m. | 10.07 | 2.0 | 7 | |
| 21 | "Live Top 10 Performance" | May 2, 2016 | 1021 | Monday 8:00 p.m. | 9.97 | 2.1 | 7 | |
| 22 | "Live Top 10 Results" | May 3, 2016 | 1022 | Tuesday 8:00 p.m. | 8.60 | 1.6 | 6 | |
| 23 | "Live Top 9 Performance" | May 9, 2016 | 1023 | Monday 8:00 p.m. | 9.87 | 2.1 | 7 | |
| 24 | "Live Top 9 Results" | May 10, 2016 | 1024 | Tuesday 8:00 p.m. | 9.05 | 1.8 | 7 | |
| 25 | "Live Top 8 Semifinals Performance" | May 16, 2016 | 1025 | Monday 8:00 p.m. | 9.52 | 2.1 | 7 | |
| 26 | "Live Top 8 Semifinals Results" | May 17, 2016 | 1026 | Tuesday 8:00 p.m. | 9.05 | 1.8 | 6 | |
| 27 | "Live Finale Performance" | May 23, 2016 | 1027 | Monday 8:00 p.m. | 10.26 | 2.0 | 7 | |
| 28 | "Live Finale Results" | May 24, 2016 | 1028 | Tuesday 9:00 p.m. | 10.59 | 2.2 | 7 | |

== Controversy and criticism ==
The show faced controversy when Katherine Ho, a contestant on Team Adam, was the second contestant in the history of the show to make it to the third round of the competition and have all of her performances, including her Blind Audition, Battle, and Knockout round, montaged (not shown in full).

According to Matt Carter, "It's not often that we write an article on 'The Voice' that is about a contestant being triple-montaged, mostly because it is such a rare phenomenon, but here we are with it happening to Katherine Ho. When it a triple-montage does happen, it just makes it all the more frustrating since it eliminates the purpose of the show. We know that there is no guarantee that you are going to get airtime when you audition for the show, but we do think for the most part you should get a little more attention than Katherine Ho got over the course of the competition. Her Battle Round performance of Caroline Burns was not really shown, and this puts her in a similar camp with Rebekah Samarin back in season 7 of the show. They made it far enough on the show that they cannot audition again, and yet they don't really get a lot of publicity – it's pretty unfair.

Here's the most egregious thing about this performance tonight: We don't even know what Katherine sang! She just didn't get any attention at all."

== Performances by guests/coaches ==
| Episode | Show segment | Performer(s) | Title | Reaction | | Performance type |
| Episode | Show segment | Performer(s) | Title | Hot 100 | Hot digital | Performance type |
|---|---|---|---|---|---|---|
| 16 | Live Playoffs Results | Jordan Smith | "Stand In The Light" | —N/a | —N/a | live performance |
| 18 | Top 12 Results | Gwen Stefani | "Misery" | —N/a | —N/a | live performance |
| 20 | Top 11 Results | Thomas Rhett | "T-Shirt" | —N/a | —N/a | live performance |
| 22 | Top 10 Results | DNCE | "Toothbrush"/"Cake by the Ocean" | —N/a | —N/a | live performance |
| 22 | Top 10 Results | Sawyer Fredericks | "4 Pockets" | —N/a | —N/a | live performance |
| 23 | Top 9 Performances | Florida Georgia Line | "H.O.L.Y." | —N/a | —N/a | live performance |
| 23 | Top 9 Performances | Blake Shelton ft. Gwen Stefani | "Go Ahead and Break My Heart" | —N/a | —N/a | live performance |
| 24 | Top 9 Results | James Bay | "Let It Go" | —N/a | —N/a | live performance |
| 24 | Top 9 Results | Andy Samberg and Adam Levine | "I'm So Humble" | —N/a | —N/a | live performance |
| 26 | Top 8 Results | Alicia Keys | "In Common" | —N/a | —N/a | live performance |
| 26 | Top 8 Results | OneRepublic | "Wherever I Go" | —N/a | —N/a | live performance |
| 28 | Finale Results | Little Big Town | "One of Those Days" | —N/a | —N/a | live performance |
| 28 | Finale Results | CeeLo Green and Hannah Huston | "Crazy" | —N/a | —N/a | live performance |
| 28 | Finale Results | Joe Walsh and Laith Al-Saadi | "Rocky Mountain Way" | —N/a | —N/a | live performance |
| 28 | Finale Results | Sia | "Cheap Thrills" | —N/a | —N/a | live performance |
| 28 | Finale Results | Alison Krauss and Adam Wakefield | "Willin'" | —N/a | —N/a | live performance |
| 28 | Finale Results | Zayn | "Like I Would" | —N/a | —N/a | live performance |
| 28 | Finale Results | Blake Shelton | "She's Got a Way with Words" | —N/a | —N/a | live performance |
| 28 | Finale Results | Jennifer Nettles and Alisan Porter | "Unlove You" | —N/a | —N/a | live performance |
| 28 | Finale Results | Ariana Grande and Christina Aguilera | "Into You" / "Dangerous Woman" | —N/a | —N/a | live performance |

== Artists who appeared on previous shows or seasons ==
- Alisan Porter was the youngest person to win Star Search at the age of five, and is known for her role as Curly Sue in the 1991 movie of the same name.
- Mary Sarah won second place in the Teen Category of the 2010 International Songwriting Competition, for her self-penned song "New Crush."
- Támar Davis appeared on Star Search as a member of Girl's Tyme and later as a solo act, and also auditioned for season four of American Idol.
- Bryan Bautista, Caroline Burns, Joe Maye, and Natalie Yacovazzi all auditioned for the ninth season, but all of them failed to turn a chair.
- After failing to turn a chair this season, Maddie Poppe went on to win American Idol season 16.
- Jonathan Bach later appeared on eighteenth season of American Idol where he eliminated during Hollywood Week.
- Malik Heard appeared on twenty-first season of American Idol and made Top 26. He later went on Building the Band, where he became 1/4 of the boyband Soulidified (temporarily renamed ICONYX before changing their name back to Soulidified after the show). The group placed 3rd in the competition.
- After failing to turn a chair this season, Brianna Mazzola went on to appear on Building the Band, where she became 1/3 of the girl group 3Quency. The group went on to win the show.
