= Alisan Porter =

American singer, actress and dancer (born 1981)

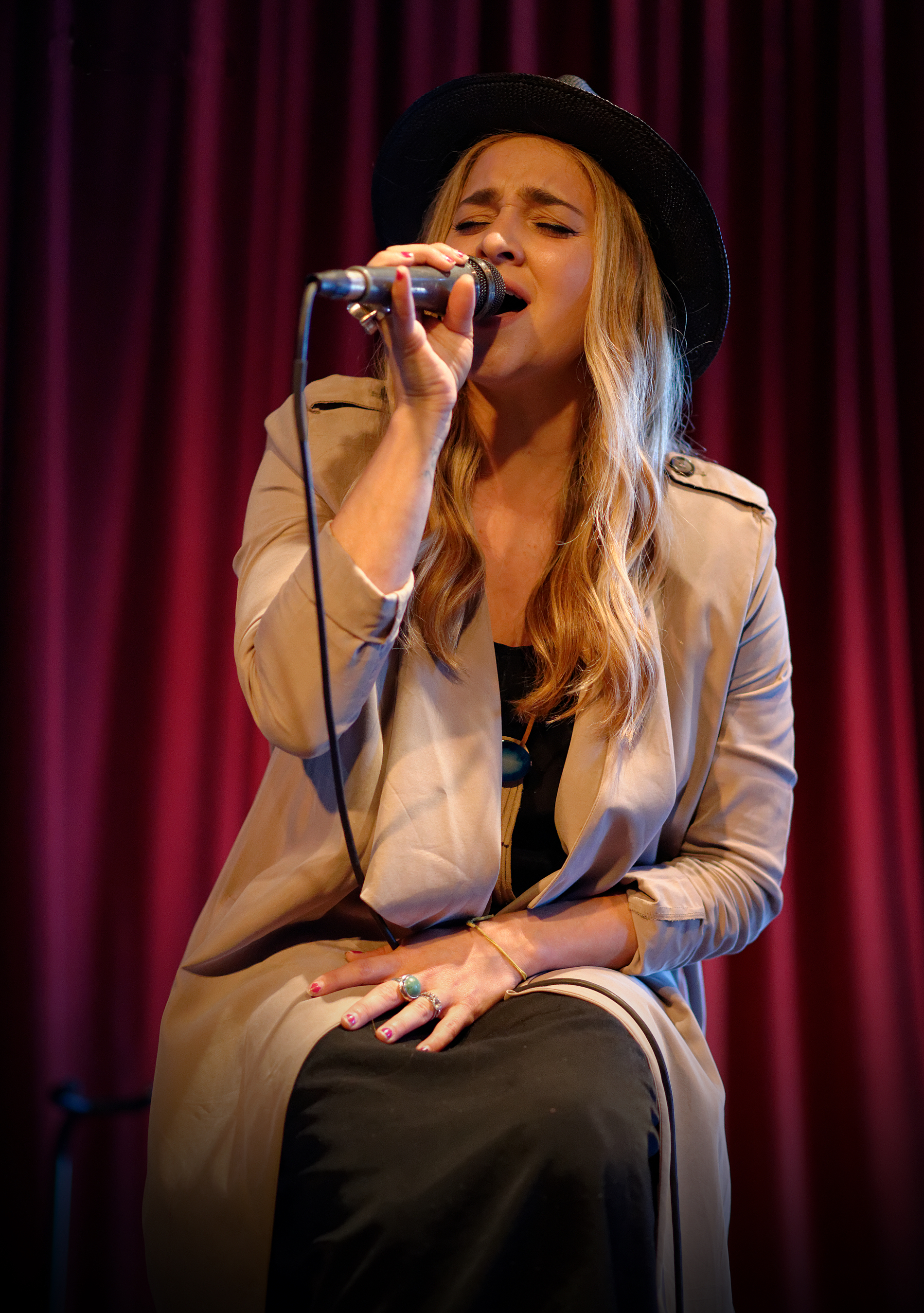
- Porter in 2015
- Born: June 20, 1981 (age 45); Worcester, Massachusetts, U.S.
- Education: Staples High School, Connecticut
- Occupations: Actress; singer
- Years active: 1987–present (actress); 2009–present (singer)
- Spouses: Brian Autenrieth (m. 2012; div. 2017) Justin de Vera (m. 2023)
- Children: 3
- Musical career
- Genres: Pop; rock; country
- Website: alisanporter.com

Alisan Leigh Porter (born June 20, 1981) is an American pop, rock & country singer, actress, and dancer. As a child, Porter made acting appearances in Parenthood, Stella and I Love You to Death. Her breakout role came in 1991, when she played the lead in the film Curly Sue opposite Jim Belushi.

As an adult, Porter pursued roles in musical theatre, including a run in The Ten Commandments: The Musical and as an original cast member of the Broadway revival of A Chorus Line. A solo album followed in 2009. In 2016 was a contestant on the tenth season of NBC's The Voice, being named the winner of the show as a part of Team Christina.

== Life and career ==
Born to Jewish parents in Worcester, Massachusetts, Porter is the great-granddaughter of prominent Worcester rabbi Joseph Klein. Her grandmother ran the Charlotte Klein Dance Center. Porter's father, Ric Porter, was co-founder, lead singer, and songwriter of the Worcester-based band Zonkaraz. Her mother, Laura Klein, also taught dance, coaching Diane and Elaine Klimaszewski, who appeared on Star Search in 1987 in the junior dance category before they became known as the Coors Light Twins. While in Los Angeles for the twins' appearance on Star Search, the show's producer heard Porter singing in the hotel lobby and booked her to appear on the next episode. Porter has been singing and performing since age three; at age five, she became the youngest Star Search participant ever to win the competition. That same year, she also appeared on Pee Wee's Playhouse as playhouse gang member Little Pumpkin (a nickname her parents called her) in Season 2.

Porter acted in several films as a child; she became known for playing the title role in the 1991 movie Curly Sue opposite Jim Belushi. On television, she played the youngest daughter of Lynn Redgrave on the short-lived ABC sitcom Chicken Soup in 1989. The following year, she was slated to be a new regular cast member on Perfect Strangers, but her character Tess Holland was dropped after only one episode, the reason for Porter being dropped was because ABC felt that adding a child to the main cast would've caused the show to not focus on main characters Larry Appleton and Balki Bartokomous, (Mark Linn-Baker and Bronson Pinchot) similar to what happened with Perfect Strangers' spin-off show Family Matters when Steve Urkel was added halfway through season one and the show was focused on Urkel and not the Winslows.

Porter continued acting at Staples High School in Westport, Connecticut, where she joined a theater group and participated in various shows. While a freshman, Porter portrayed Anita in West Side Story, and as a senior played the lead in Cinderella. After Porter won The Voice in 2016, her former high school drama teacher said she was not surprised by the result. "She blew everybody away" with her performance in West Side Story, and "really seemed to get the best out of everybody else. Her energy rubbed off on everybody. She inspired others."

When she was 18 years old, Porter moved to New York to audition for Broadway shows. She was cast as Urleen in the show Footloose. Following her move to Los Angeles, Porter starred as Miriam in The Ten Commandments: The Musical at the Kodak Theatre alongside Val Kilmer, Adam Lambert and Broadway star Lauren Kennedy. Variety rated her performance of the song "Light of a New Day" as "superb".

In 2003, the band The Raz was formed, with Porter as the vocalist and main songwriter. The Raz split up in 2004. In March 2005, she announced the birth of her new band, The Alisan Porter Project. During 2006, she performed in the revival of A Chorus Line as Bebe Benzenheimer at the Gerald Schoenfeld Theatre in New York City. Parts of her audition are featured in the film Every Little Step. On October 9, 2009, her independent debut album Alisan Porter was released.

Porter sang the National Anthem at the 2016 A Capitol Fourth special on July 3 at the U.S. Capitol West Lawn in Washington, D.C. The special was broadcast on PBS. She also sang the anthem prior to the nationally televised Sunday Night Football game in Oakland, CA on November 6, 2016.

In 2017, Porter, alongside Matt McAndrew, Mary Sarah, Chris Mann, Matthew Schuler, Michael Sanchez and Chloe Kohanski headlined the new Las Vegas show called The Voice: Neon Dreams.

=== The Voice (2016) ===
On February 29, 2016, she became a contestant on season 10 of The Voice and sang "Blue Bayou" for her blind audition performance. All four coaches – Christina Aguilera, Adam Levine, Blake Shelton, and Pharrell Williams – turned their chairs for her and she chose Aguilera as her coach. In the battle rounds, Porter was up against Lacy Mandigo with the song "California Dreamin'" by The Mamas & the Papas as a rock version. In the knockout rounds, Porter beat Daniel Passino. Porter went on to sing through the live shows, advancing via public vote every week up to the finals, where she performed her original song "Down That Road". On May 24, 2016, Porter was crowned the season 10 winner of The Voice. She also helped make The Voice US history as the first artist to win the show with a female coach, giving Aguilera her first win as a coach.

← Studio version reached the top 10 on iTunes.

Stage	Song	Original Artist	Date	Order	Result
Blind Audition	"Blue Bayou"	Roy Orbison	Feb. 29, 2016	1.11	All four chairs turned; joined Team Christina
Battles (Top 48)	"California Dreamin'" (vs. Lacy Mandigo)	The Mamas and The Papas	March 21, 2016	8.9	Saved by Christina
Knockouts (Top 32)	"River" (vs. Daniel Passino)	Joni Mitchell	March 28, 2016	10.5	Saved by Christina
Live Playoffs (Top 24)	"Cry Baby"	Janis Joplin	April 11, 2016	14.12	Saved by Public Vote
Live Top 12	"Stone Cold"	Demi Lovato	April 18, 2016	17.9	Saved by Public Vote
Live Top 11	"Stay with Me Baby"	Lorraine Ellison	April 25, 2016	19.6	Saved by Public Vote
Live Top 10	"Let Him Fly"	Patty Griffin	May 2, 2016	21.9	Saved by Public Vote
Live Top 9	"Cryin'"	Aerosmith	May 9, 2016	23.8	Saved by Public Vote
Live Top 8 (Semifinals)	"Desperado"	Eagles	May 16, 2016	25.4	Saved by Public Vote
Live Finale (Final 4)	"Down That Road" (original song)	Porter	May 23, 2016	26.2	Winner
Live Finale (Final 4)	"You've Got a Friend" (with Christina Aguilera)	Carole King	May 23, 2016	26.6	Winner
Live Finale (Final 4)	"Somewhere"	West Side Story	May 23, 2016	26.12	Winner

Non-competition performances:
Collaborator(s)	Song	Original artist
Bryan Bautista, Nick Hagelin, Tamar Davis, Kata Hay, and Ryan Quinn	"Stars"	Grace Potter and the Nocturnals
Christina Aguilera, Bryan Bautista, & Nick Hagelin	"Live and Let Die"	Paul McCartney & Wings
Adam Wakefield	"Angel from Montgomery"	Bonnie Raitt & John Prine
Paxton Ingram, Kata Hay and Ryan Quinn	"Straight On"	Heart
Jennifer Nettles	"Unlove You"	Jennifer Nettles

== Personal life ==
Porter has openly discussed her battles with alcoholism and drug addiction. She says she has been sober since October 28, 2007.

In December 2008, Porter became a contributing columnist for movmnt magazine. Porter created a closed Facebook page for mothers called Lil' Mamas and then, in 2012, a related blog website of the same name that she runs with her business partner, Celia Behar.

On March 10, 2012, Porter married Brian Autenrieth, a fruit exporter and former child soap opera actor, in California. The couple have two children: son Mason Blaise (b. July 17, 2012) and daughter Aria Sage Autenrieth (b. May 8, 2014). On December 18, 2017, Porter announced on Twitter that the couple had separated in March. She said, "In a sad and honest note Brian and I ended our relationship in March. We remain close friends and are committed to always doing our best for our amazing kids."

On October 20, 2021, Porter gave birth to her third child, daughter Shilo Bee with her childhood friend, professional dancer Justin de Vera. On April 16, 2023, Porter and de Vera married at Caesars Palace in Las Vegas.

== Filmography ==
=== Film ===
Year	Title	Role	Notes
1988	Homesick	Maggie	
1989	Parenthood	Taylor Buckman	
1990	Stella	Jenny Claire (age 8)	
1990	I Love You to Death	Carla Boca	
1991	Curly Sue	Curly Sue	
2003	Shrink Rap	Brandi	
2006	The Ten Commandments: The Musical	Miriam	
2008	Meet Dave	A Chorus Line Dancer	
2008	Every Little Step	Herself	

=== Television ===
Year	Title	Role	Notes
1987	Pee-wee's Playhouse	Li'l Punkin	season 2
1987	I'll Take Manhattan	Young Maxi	Miniseries
1987	Family Ties	Child	Episode: "Miracle in Columbus"
1987	A Beverly Hills Christmas	Herself	Television film
1989–90	Chicken Soup	Molly Peerce	12 episodes
1990	Perfect Strangers	Tess Holland	Episode: "New Kid on the Block"
1990	When You Remember Me	Kelly	Movie
1991	The Golden Girls	Melissa	Episode: "Beauty and the Beast"
2001	Undressed	Belinda	Season 4 episodes
2016	The Voice	Herself / Artist	Season 10 winner

== Discography ==
=== Albums ===
Title	Details	Peak chart positions
Title	Details	US Folk
Alisan Porter	Type: Debut album; Released: October 9, 2009	—
Who We Are	Type: Album; Released: November 24, 2014	20
Pink Cloud	Type: Album; Released: September 13, 2019	—
Porter	Released: September 18, 2026	

=== EP's ===
Title	Details	Peak chart positions
Title	Details	US Folk
I Come in Pieces	Released: 2017	—
The Ride	Released: June 21, 2024	

=== Releases from The Voice ===
==== Albums ====
Album	Details	Peak chart positions	
Album	Details	US	US Digital
The Complete Season 10 Collection (The Voice Performance)	Release date: May 24, 2016; Label: Republic Records; Formats: music download	27	

==== Singles ====
Year	Single	Peak positions					Sales
Year	Single	US	US Digital	US Country	US Country Digital	US Rock	Sales
2016	"Blue Bayou"	—	—	41	24	—	30,000+
2016	"California Dreamin'" (with Lacy Mandigo)	—	—	—	—	—	
2016	"River"	—	—	—	—	—	
2016	"Cry Baby"	—	—	—	—	—	
2016	"Stone Cold"	—	—	—	—	—	
2016	"Stay with Me Baby"	—	—	—	—	—	
2016	"Let Him Fly"	—	34	—	—	—	
2016	"Cryin'"	—	—	—	—	30	
2016	"Desperado"	—	24	—	—	—	
2016	"Somewhere"	—	21	—	—	—	65,000+
2016	"You've Got a Friend" (with Christina Aguilera)	—	—	—	—	—	25,000+
2016	"Down That Road"	100	20	—	—	—	62,000+
2017	"Deep Water"	—	—	—	—	—	
"—" denotes releases that did not chart

=== Other works ===
Porter co-wrote the following songs:

- Adam Lambert – For Your Entertainment (2009)
  - "Aftermath" (Adam Lambert, Alisan Porter, Ferras, Ely Rise)
- Scarlett Cherry – Labor of Love (2011)
  - Angel (Alisan Porter, Ely Rise, Scarlett Cherry, Lee Cherry, Guy Baruch)
  - Sleep Until You Dream (Alisan Porter, IIsey Juber, Jordan Lawhead, Scarlett Cherry, Lee Cherry)
  - Never Knew Love (Alisan Porter, Ely Rise, Scarlett Cherry, Lee Cherry)

Porter appears on the 2006 Revival Cast Recording of A Chorus Line, portraying Bebe Benzenheimer, whom she also portrayed on Broadway.

== Awards and nominations ==
Year	Association	Category	Nominated work	Result
1992	Young Artist Awards	Best Young Actress Guest Starring or Recurring Role in a TV Series	The Golden Girls	Nominated
1993	Young Artist Awards	Best Young Actress Starring in a Motion Picture	Curly Sue	Won

Awards and achievements
Preceded by Jordan Smith	The Voice (American); Winner; 2016 (Spring)	Succeeded by Sundance Head
Preceded by "Climb Ev'ry Mountain"	The Voice; Winner's song "Down That Road"; 2016 (Spring)	Succeeded by "Darlin' Don't Go"
