= Owen Danoff =

- Born: John Owen Danoff; November 3, 1989 (age 36); Washington, D.C., U.S.
- Genres: Pop, folk, rock
- Occupations: Singer, songwriter
- Instruments: Vocals, guitar, bass, hammer dulcimer
- Website: owendanoff.com

Owen Danoff (born November 3, 1989) is an American singer-songwriter from Washington, D.C. He was a contestant on season 10 of NBC's The Voice where he reached the top 11.

== Life and career ==
Owen Danoff was exposed to music from an early age. His father is Grammy Award winner Bill Danoff, a songwriter and original member of the Starland Vocal Band. As a child, he was immersed in his family's musical culture and can recall joining his father onstage at shows. At the age of 15, Danoff wrote and self-produced his first original song using an audio recorder given to him that same day. He attended Gonzaga College High School in Washington, D.C. After high school, Danoff studied at Berklee College of Music in Boston, graduating with a degree in film scoring.

Owen Danoff returned to the D.C. music scene after college, performing at venues such as the Birchmere, the Kennedy Center and the 9:30 Club. In 2012, he released an EP titled ‘Never Trust a Man’. Following the EP release, Danoff was an artist in residence at Strathmore's Institute for Artistic and Professional Development from 2012 to 2013. During that time, he ran a successful Kickstarter campaign to help fund his full-length debut album. He released ‘Twelve Stories’ in May 2014. The album is a collection of his original music and led Danoff to three Washington Area Music Awards (Wammies) wins. The awards were for best Pop/Rock Recording, Pop/Rock Instrumentalist, and Pop/Rock Vocalist. In 2014, he also released a single titled "Never Been Kissed".

In 2015, Danoff released a single titled "No Such Thing (As You and Me)". For this song, American Songwriter awarded him 1st place in their March/April 2015 lyric contest. After a successful stint on NBC's The Voice where he reached the top 11, Danoff released his latest single titled "Love on Your Side" on July 8, 2016. This song is also the title track on his latest EP, which was released on September 23, 2016. The ‘Love on Your Side’ EP was funded with the help of a successful PledgeMusic campaign, and consists of six original tracks. In addition to his own 2016 releases, Danoff was also credited as a co-songwriter on Nashville star Charles Esten's single "Already Gone Away".

== The Voice Season 10 ==
Owen Danoff was a contestant on season 10 of NBC's The Voice, where he finished in 11th place. He was one of the few performers that season to achieve a chair-turn by all four judges. He chose Adam Levine as his coach.

– Studio version of performance reached the top 10 on iTunes

Order	Air Date	Round	Song	Original Artist	Result
4.6	March 8, 2016	Blind Audition	"Don't Think Twice, It's All Right"	Bob Dylan	All Four Chairs; Joined Team Adam
9.5	March 22, 2016	Battle Rounds	"Runaway" (vs. John Gilman)	Del Shannon	Saved By Coach
10.2	March 28, 2016	Knockout Rounds	"She's Always a Woman" (vs. Ryan Quinn)	Billy Joel	Saved By Coach
15.6	April 12, 2016	Live Playoffs (Top 24)	"Hero" ^{1}	Family of the Year	Saved By Coach
17.8	April 18, 2016	Live Top 12	"7 Years" ^{2}	Lukas Graham	Bottom two
18.2	April 19, 2016	Live Top 12 Results	"Lego House" (vs. Emily Keener)	Ed Sheeran	Saved by Instant Save
19.4	April 25, 2016	Live Top 11	"Fire and Rain"	James Taylor	Bottom two
20.2	April 26, 2016	Live Top 11 Results	"Burning House" (vs. Daniel Passino)	Cam	Eliminated

- ^Note 1 The studio version of this performance reached No. 28 on iTunes.
- ^Note 2 The studio version of this performance reached No. 53 on iTunes.

== Discography ==
=== Studio albums ===
Title	Album details
Twelve Stories	Released: May 6, 2014; Self-released; Formats: CD, digital download

=== Extended plays ===
Title	Details
Never Trust A Man	Released: January 26, 2012; Self-released; Formats: CD, digital download
Love on Your Side	Released: September 23, 2016; Self-released; Formats: CD, digital download

=== Digital singles ===
Year	Song	Album
2014	"Never Been Kissed"	Non-album single
2015	"No Such Thing"	Non-album single
2016	"Love on Your Side"	Love on Your Side EP
