= Down That Road =

Down That Road may refer to:

- "Down That Road" (Shara Nelson song), 1993
- "Down That Road" (Alisan Porter song), 2016
