= Mary Sarah =

American singer-songwriter

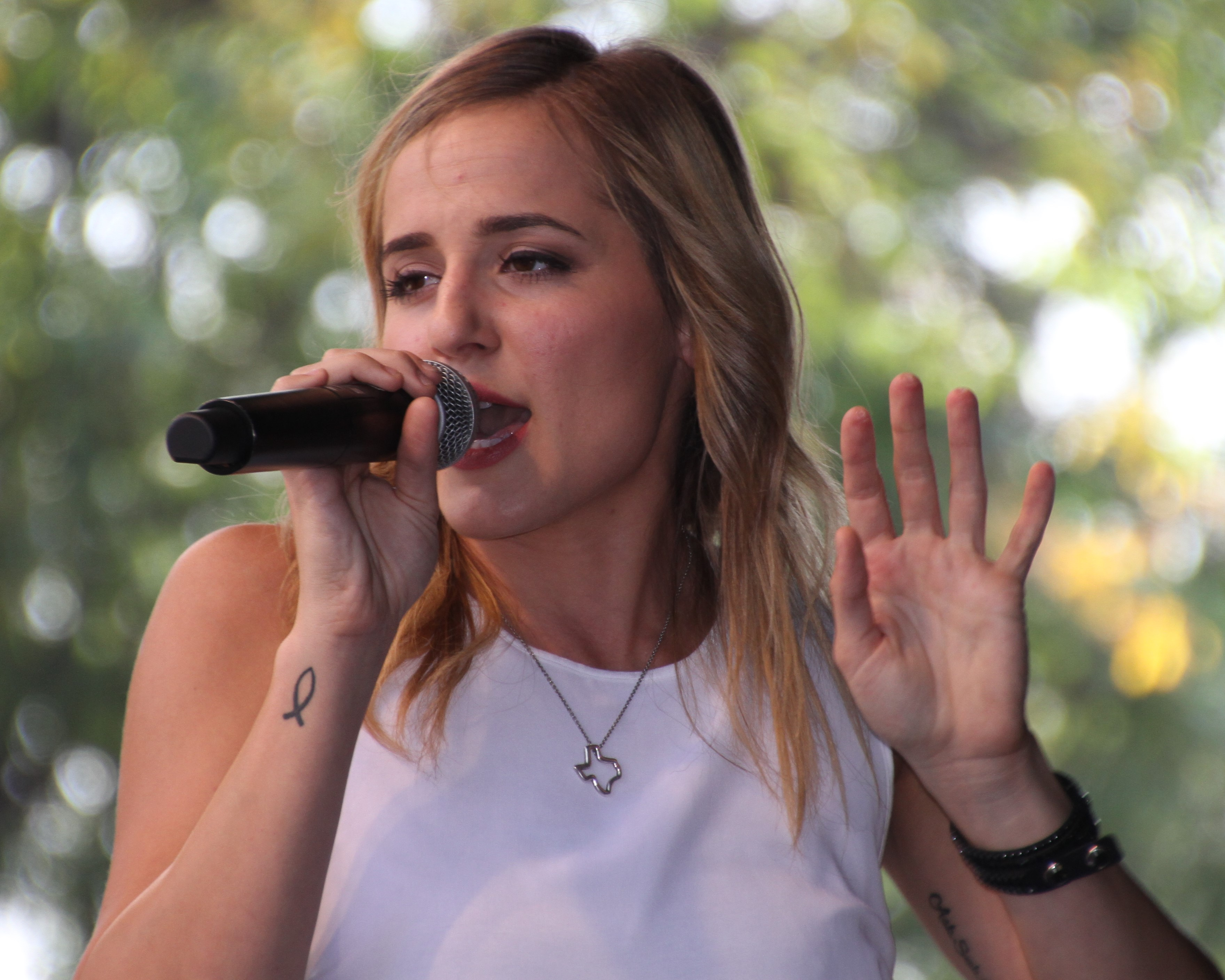
- Mary Sarah at the 2017 Minnesota State Fair

Background information
- Also known as: Mary Sarah
- Born: Mary Sarah Gross; Tulsa, Oklahoma, U.S.
- Genre: Country
- Occupations: Singer, songwriter
- Instruments: Vocals, guitar
- Years active: 2007–present
- Website: marysarah.com/

Mary Sarah Gross is an American country music singer and songwriter. She started her career with performances local to her region, before being picked up by Kidz Bop in 2007. After leaving them, she continued with local and regional performances before releasing Crazy Good in 2010. Her second album, Bridges, followed in 2014, and included duets with several high-profile country music stars. A third album, Dress Up This Town, followed a year later, and she has performed at the Grand Ole Opry and was featured on The Voice.

In 2024, Mary Sarah released the single “Baby Mama”, co-written by Jesse Lee, Blake Bollinger, and Nate Kenton. The song was distributed across digital streaming platforms and received positive critical attention for its empowering message and contemporary country sound. People magazine premiered the music video and highlighted the track as a tribute to mothers, describing it as “a way to thank my mom.”Goldberg, Brooke (June 14, 2024). "Mary Sarah Honors the Strength of Moms in 'Baby Mama' Music Video: 'A Way to Thank My Mom' (Exclusive)". People.

== Early years ==
Mary Sarah Gross was born in Tulsa, Oklahoma to Richard and Patricia Gross. She has a sister, a brother and a step-brother. Her brother was born prematurely, received a liver transplant and is Type 1 diabetic. For this reason, she supports the Juvenile Diabetes Research Foundation (JDRF). She is also the National Ambassador for Caiden's Hope, an organization that assists with non-medical expenses related to caring for an infant in neonatal intensive care.

== Singing career ==
Mary Sarah began performing in church at the age of 8, and began to appear on radio stations and at several regional Opry Theaters. She was signed to the Osbrink Talent Agency in Los Angeles at age 11, and in 2007, at the age of 12, toured as a featured lead vocalist and dancer in Kidz Bop for six months. At the age of 14, she left the agency and returned to Texas, where she performed in local and regional events.

In 2010 she released her first album, Crazy Good.

In January 2011, Mary Sarah was invited to meet The Oak Ridge Boys after Joe Bonsall saw a video of her performance of "Don't Stop Believing" at the Sugar Land (Texas) Idol competition. After visiting with them backstage before the show at the Galveston Grand Opera House, Joe and Duane Allen invited her onstage to sing "Where the Boys Are". She credits the support and love of The Oak Ridge Boys for helping her career move forward.

In 2011, she hosted a four-part series for the 2011 season of "OPRY on the Square – Country Now and Then" at the Sugar Land, TX, town square. In December 2011, the Houston Texans held a vote-in contest to see who would sing the National Anthem for their annual Home for the Holidays game. Mary Sarah was the winner over 7 other finalists. In April 2014, Mary Sarah appeared on the "Opry Country Classics" with Lynn Anderson and The Oakridge Boys, honoring the late Ray Price

On July 8, 2014, Mary Sarah released her second album, Bridges. Included on the album is a rendition of "Where the Boys Are" with Neil Sedaka. The Oak Ridge Boys also appear on the album singing "Dream On" with her. Several major country stars also join Mary in duet. On July 29, 2014, Mary Sarah appeared on Mike Huckabee's show on Fox News to promote her new album. The Governor played bass in accompaniment as they performed "The Fightin' Side of Me".

On May 31, 2016, Mary Sarah made her Grand Ole Opry debut. Mary Sarah has appeared a total of 5 times since that date.

On October 31, 2017, Deadline Hollywood announced that Mary Sarah was selected to be a lead performer in The Voice: Neon Dreams.

=== The Voice (2016) ===
On February 29, 2016, Mary Sarah auditioned on season 10 of The Voice with "Where the Boys Are". All four coaches turned their chairs for her, and she chose Blake Shelton as her coach. She defeated Justin Whisnant in the battles, and defeated Brittany Kennell in the knockouts. She placed in the middle three in the semifinals and was then eliminated in the Instant Save performances, placing her in the Top Six. She lost a "twitter save" to Laith Al Saadi, the bearded blues guitarist/rocker from Ann Arbor Michigan in a sing off, exiting the show in the 5th position.

– Studio version of performance reached the top 10 on iTunes

Order	Air Date	Round	Song	Original Artist	Result
1.5	February 29	Blind Audition	"Where the Boys Are"	Connie Francis	All Four Chairs; Joined Team Blake
7.2	March 15	Battle Rounds	"Louisiana Woman, Mississippi Man" (vs. Justin Whisnant)	Conway Twitty feat. Loretta Lynn	Saved By Coach
12.2	April 4	Knockout Rounds	"You Ain't Woman Enough (To Take My Man)" (vs. Brittany Kennell)	Loretta Lynn	Saved By Coach
14.9	April 11	Live Playoffs (Top 24)	"(I Never Promised You A) Rose Garden"	Lynn Anderson	Saved By Public Vote
17.1	April 18	Live Top 12	"So Small"	Carrie Underwood	Saved By Public Vote
19.5	April 25	Live Top 11	"Johnny and June"	Heidi Newfield	Saved By Public Vote
21.7	May 2	Live Top 10	"Stand By Your Man"	Tammy Wynette	Saved By Public Vote
23.2	May 9	Live Top 9	"My Church"	Maren Morris	Saved By Public Vote
25.7	May 16	Live Semifinals (Top 8)	"I Told You So"	Randy Travis	Middle 3
26.1	May 17	Semifinals Instant Save	"Something in the Water"	Carrie Underwood	Eliminated

Non-Competition Performances:
Order	Collaborator(s)	Song	Original Artist
16.3	Katie Basden; Paxton Ingram; Joe Maye; Adam Wakefield; Justin Whisnant	"Hey Brother"	Avicii
18.2	Blake Shelton, Paxton Ingram, and Adam Wakefield	"I Love a Rainy Night"	Eddie Rabbitt
25.2	Bryan Bautista	"Break Free"	Ariana Grande
28.12	Adam Wakefield; Nick Hagelin; Justin Whisnant	"Gimme Some Lovin'"	Spencer Davis Group

== Discography ==
=== Albums ===
Title	Album details	Peak chart positions	Sales
Title	Album details	US Heatseeker	Sales
Crazy Good	Release date: April 25, 2010; Label: AGR Television Records; Formats: CD, music download		
Bridges	Release date: July 8, 2014; Label: Cleopatra; Formats: CD, music download	28	US: 2,400
Dress up This Town	Release date: August 9, 2015; Label: Cleopatra; Formats: CD, music download		

=== Singles ===
Year	Single	Peak positions
Year	Single	US Country
2016	"Stand by Your Man"	36
2016	"My Church"	35
2016	"I Told You So"	29
