= Laith Al-Saadi =

American musician

- Born: October 5, 1977 (age 49); Ann Arbor, Michigan, U.S.
- Genres: Blues; blues rock; rock
- Occupations: Musician; songwriter
- Instruments: Vocals; guitar
- Years active: 1992–present
- Website: laithalsaadi.com

Laith Al-Saadi (born October 5, 1977) is an American musician from Ann Arbor, Michigan.

Al-Saadi gained nationwide recognition after he won a spot in the 2016 finale of the musical competition series The Voice.

== Early life and education ==
Laith Al-Saadi first learned to sing with the Boys' Choir of Ann Arbor when he was four years old, and then started playing the guitar at age 13. His father is from Baqubah, Iraq and his mother is from Beverly Shores, Indiana. As a student of Ann Arbor's Community High School, he played in the school's jazz band.

Al-Saadi attended the University of Michigan and received a degree in jazz guitar and bass.

== Career ==
=== Long Time Coming, In the Round, and Real (1992–2014) ===
In 1992, Al-Saadi joined a local blues band called Blue Vinyl. The group was successful enough to tour the Netherlands, and landed gigs opening for Buddy Guy, Son Seals, Luther Allison, and Taj Mahal. In 2005, Al-Saadi released his first solo album, Long Time Coming. In 2006, Al-Saadi was named "King of the Blues" for the Northern United States by Guitar Center, "making him one of top four blues guitarists in the country". In 2008, Al-Saadi released In the Round. 2013 saw the release of Real, a live-in-the-studio set with Al-Saadi backed by a band including Jimmy Vivino on rhythm guitar, Leland Sklar on bass, Jim Keltner on drums, and Tom Scott on sax.

=== The Voice and Don't You Give Up On Me (2015–present) ===
In March 2016, Al-Saadi was chosen to be a contestant on the musical competition series The Voice and gained nationwide recognition after he made it to the finale.

In May 2016, two of Al-Saadi's songs from the album The Complete Season 10 Collection (The Voice Performance) made it to Billboard's Hot Rock Songs chart; "Born Under a Bad Sign" at No. 50 and "We've Got Tonight" at No. 22.

– Studio version of performance reached the top 10 on iTunes

Stage	Song	Original Artist	Date	Order	Result
Blind Audition	"The Letter"	Joe Cocker	March 1, 2016	2.7	Adam Levine and Blake Shelton turned; Joined Team Adam
Battle Rounds (Top 48)	"Honky Tonk Women" (vs. Matt Tedder)	The Rolling Stones	March 22, 2016	9.1	Saved by Coach
Knockout Rounds (Top 32)	"In Your Eyes" (vs. Jessica Crosbie)	Peter Gabriel	April 4, 2016	12.5	Saved by Coach
Live Playoffs (Top 24)	"With a Little Help from My Friends"	The Beatles	April 12, 2016	15.3	Saved by Public Vote
Live Top 12	"Born Under a Bad Sign"	Albert King	April 18, 2016	17.2	Saved by Public Vote
Live Top 11	"Make It Rain"	Foy Vance	April 25, 2016	19.11	Saved by Public Vote
Live Top 10	"The Thrill Is Gone"	B. B. King	May 2, 2016	21.5	Saved by Public Vote
Live Top 9	"We've Got Tonight"	Bob Seger	May 9, 2016	23.6	Saved by Public Vote
Live Semi-finals (Top 8)	"One and Only"	Adele	May 16, 2016	25.4	Middle 3
Semi-finals Instant Save	"All Along the Watchtower"	Bob Dylan	May 17, 2016	26.3	Saved by Twitter Instant Save
Live Finals (Top 4)	"White Room"	Cream	May 23, 2016	27.1	4th place
Live Finals (Top 4)	"Golden Slumbers/Carry That Weight/The End" (with Adam Levine)	The Beatles	May 23, 2016	27.5	4th place
Live Finals (Top 4)	"Morning Light" (original song)	Laith Al-Saadi	May 23, 2016	27.9	4th place

Round	Episode / Order	Collaborators	Song	Original Artist	References
Live Playoffs Results	16.5	Caroline Burns, Nate Butler, Owen Danoff, Shalyah Fearing and Brian Nhira	"Your Song"	Elton John	
Live Top 1 Results	18.3	Owen Danoff and Shalyah Fearing	"If You Want Me to Stay"	Sly and the Family Stone	
Live Semi-finals (Top 8)	25.7	Hannah Huston	"Knock on Wood"	Eddie Floyd	
The Finale Results	28.4	Joe Walsh	"Rocky Mountain Way"	Joe Walsh	
The Finale Results	28.10	Katie Basden and Shalyah Fearing	"Georgia on My Mind"	Ray Charles	

In 2019, Al-Saadi played new acoustic solo shows. In 2020, Al-Saadi won the award for "Best Blues Instrumentalist" at the Detroit Music Awards. He released the album Don't You Give Up on Me in 2024.

== Discography ==
Studio albums

- Long Time Coming (2005)
- In the Round (2008)
- Real (2013)
- Don't You Give Up on Me (2024)
