= Chase Walker =

American singer, songwriter and guitarist

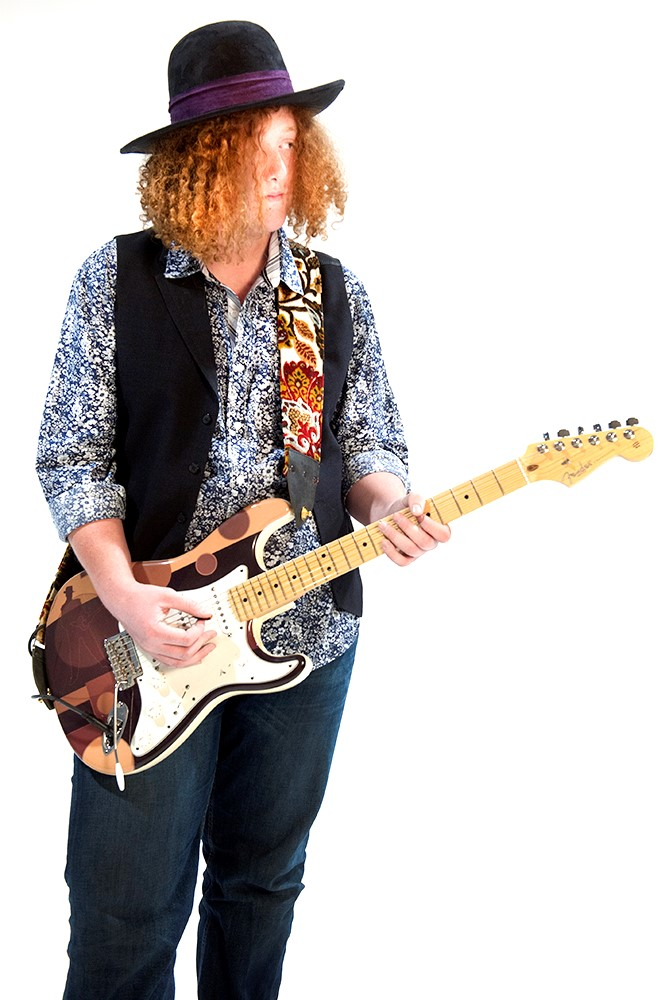

Background information
- Born: August 16, 1998 (age 27)
- Origin: Born in Riverside, California, United States; currently residing in Nashville, Tennessee
- Genres: Rock; Blues; Jazz
- Occupations: Singer and Songwriter; Guitarist
- Instruments: Guitar, drums and piano (occasional)
- Years active: 2010–present
- Website: chasewalkerband.com

Chase Walker (born August 16, 1998) is an American singer, songwriter and guitarist. He is the lead vocalist of his own California based outfit, the Chase Walker Band formed in 2012, Currently Chase Walker band has been touring with various rhythm sections. Chase currently attends Belmont University in Nashville where he is pursuing a dual major of Songwriting & Music Business.

== Musical career ==
Walker started playing blues with backtracks when he was 11. He was inspired by artists like Muddy Waters, Little Milton, Stevie Ray Vaughan and Albert Collins.

He participated in festivals, tours and clubs with his band in Vans Warped Tour, The International Blues Challenge, House of Blues, B. B. King’s Memphis, Ground Zero (blues club), Buddy Guy's Legends, El Rey Theatre, The Roxy and more, opening for such as Kenny Loggins, B. B. King, Coco Montoya, Eric Sardinas, Tab Benoit, American Idol contestant Casey Abrams, Walter Trout, Devon Allman and Cyril Neville.

== Awards and recognition ==
- 2023 Great American Song Contest Finalist in Rock Category for the song Move Ya
- 2018 Blues Rock Review The Future of Blues Rock – 10 Acts To Watch Under 30
- 2018 2nd Place in Lee Ritenour World Wide Six Strings Theory Guitar Contest
- 2016 Album "Not Quite legal" Nominated for IMA Blues Album of the Year.
- 2016 Album "Not Quite legal" ranked #2 album of 2016 by Blues Rock Review.
- 2016 The Voice Season 10
- 2014 Lee Ritenour Six Strings Theory Guitar Finalist
- 2013 & 2014 Van's Warped Tour Performer
- 2013 John Lennon Songwriting Contest Winner
- Best Debut Blue in Germany – Wasser Prawda Magazine
- Song Good Day for the Blues charted #47 in the Hit-Tracks 100
- best young blues/rock band in this country – Kevin Lyman (Founder of the Van's Warped Tour)
- Member of Exclusive Brotherhood of the Guitar
- American Blues Scene Magazine – Top 10 Under 18 Artist you need to Know

== Discography ==
=== Albums & Singles Released ===
- Album - Sounds of an Old Soul, 2024
- Single - Move Ya, 2024
- Single - Bones, 2023
- Single - No Good, 2023
- Single - Your Books, 2021
- Album - Live at the Woodshed, 2018
- Single - Honey Jar, 2018
- Single - Don't Do It, 2017
- Album - Not Quite Legal, 2016
- Single - Living on Thin Ice, 2015
- Album - Unleashed, 2014
- Single - Blues Deluxe, 2014
- Single - Good Day for The Blues, 2014

== Past band members ==
- Matt Fyke (Drums) 2012–2016
- Randon Davitt (Bass, Vocals) 2012–2016
- Peter Kastaris (Drums, Vocals) 2017
- Greggory Garner Jr (Bass) 2017
- Yates McKendree (Keyboard/Organ) 2017
