= Katherine Ho =

Chinese American singer

- Born: 1999 (age 26–27); Thousand Oaks, California
- Education: University of Southern California
- Occupations: Singer, student

Katherine Ho (Chinese: 何光玥; pinyin: Hé Guāngyùe) is a singer known for her performance of Coldplay's Yellow in Mandarin Chinese for the 2018 film, Crazy Rich Asians. The song has reached No. 1 on Spotify Viral 50 Global chart. Previously, she appeared on season 10 of The Voice.

== Early life ==
Ho was born on July 13, 1999. At age 5, she started taking piano lessons. At age 9, she started singing.

== Education ==
In 2015, Ho attended Grammy Camp. In 2015, 2016 and 2017, she attended A Cappella Academy. Katherine graduated from Westlake High School, Thousand Oaks, California in 2017. As of 2018, Ho attended the University of Southern California in Los Angeles. She is majoring in biology with a minor in songwriting.

== Career ==
In September 2014, Ho performed at the 626 Night Market in Santa Anita Racetrack venue in Arcadia, California. In 2017 and 2018, she hosted and performed at Luna New Year Celebration at Santa Monica Place. Although still a college student, she became notable for recording the song Coldplay's Yellow in Mandarin, as one of the songs on the soundtrack of the 2018 film Crazy Rich Asians.

On August 30, 2019, Ho released her debut single Bellyaches. She also sang the song "Endless Sky" from the 2021 movie Wish Dragon.
