= Daniel Passino =

American singer and songwriter (born 1995)

- Born: Daniel Alan Passino; January 30, 1995 (age 31); Garden City, Michigan, U.S.
- Genres: Pop, R&B
- Instrument: Vocals

Daniel Alan Passino (born January 30, 1995) is an American singer and songwriter. He became an artist on Season 10 of NBC's The Voice, March 8, 2016 at age 21. In The Top 10, he was eliminated.

== Life and career ==
Passino was born and raised in New Boston, Michigan, a suburb of Detroit. He moved to Ann Arbor, Michigan in 2012 to attend the University of Michigan for Vocal Performance and Communications. At the University of Michigan, he joined The University of Michigan Men's Glee Club and their subset a capella group The Friars. On August 3, 2016, he released his debut single titled "Tell Me".. He now crushes sales at Yelp Inc. Passino is also a two time winner of the lauded Vagrant Golf Tournament, held annually in Michigan.

== The Voice ==
On March 8, 2016 Passino auditioned for Season 10 of The Voice and turned the chairs of Christina Aguilera and Blake Shelton. Passino chose Christina Aguilera as his coach. On March 21 (Episode 8), he won his battle against Kristen Marie. On March 28 (Episode 10), he lost in the knockout rounds against Alisan Porter. On April 12 (Episode 15), he advanced to the live playoffs as a coach comeback on Team Pharrell.

Round	Date	Song	Original Artist	Order	Notes
Blind Audition	Tuesday, March 8	"Marvin Gaye"	Charlie Puth	4.5	Christina and Blake turned Joined Team Christina
Battle Rounds	Monday, March 21	"Turning Tables" (vs. Kristen Marie)	Adele	8.3	Saved By Coach
Knockout Round	Monday, March 28	"Ain't Too Proud to Beg" (vs. Alisan Porter)	The Temptations	10.5	Defeated, but was chosen as the Coach Comeback Artist for Team Pharrell
Live Playoffs	Monday, April 11	"When I Was Your Man"	Bruno Mars	15.1	Saved by Public Vote
Top 12	Monday, April 18	"Human Nature"	Michael Jackson	17.3	Saved by Public Vote
Top 11	Monday, April 25	"Time After Time"	Cyndi Lauper	19.2	Bottom 2. Saved by Instant Save (via Twitter)
Top 11	Tuesday, April 26	"Jealous"	Nick Jonas	20.1	Bottom 2. Saved by Instant Save (via Twitter)
Top 10	Monday, May 2	"I Don't Want to Miss a Thing"	Aerosmith	21.1	Eliminated
Top 10	Tuesday, May 3	"Uptown Funk"	Mark Ronson / Bruno Mars	22.2	Eliminated

Non Competition Performances:
Collaborator(s)	Song	Original Artist
Team Pharrell Ladies	"Don't You Worry Child"	Swedish House Mafia
Pharrell Williams and Hannah Huston	"Let Love Rule"	Lenny Kravitz

=== Singles ===
Year	Single
2016	"Marvin Gaye"
2016	"Turning Tables" (vs. Kristen Marie)
2016	"Ain't Too Proud to Beg"
2016	"When I Was Your Man"
2016	"Human Nature"
2016	"Time After Time"
2016	"Jealous"
2016	"I Don't Want to Miss a Thing"
2016	"Uptown Funk"
