= Támar Davis =

American singer

- Born: Ashley Támar Davis
- Origin: Houston, Texas, U.S.
- Genres: R&B, funk, pop
- Occupation: Singer
- Years active: 1990–1993 (group); 1998–present (solo)
- Label: Universal Records
- Formerly of: Girl's Tyme
- Website: tamardavis.com

Ashley Támar Davis (known professionally as Támar Davis and sometimes simply Támar) is an American singer. She began her career as member of the girl group Girl's Tyme, appearing on Star Search before departing ahead of their transition into Destiny's Child. A longtime protégé of Prince, she toured with him during the promotion of 3121 (2006), and collaborated on the duet "Beautiful, Loved and Blessed", which earned her a nomination for Best R&B Performance by a Duo or Group with Vocals at the 49th Annual Grammy Awards. In 2016, she competed on season 10 of The Voice and later performed with Kanye West's Sunday Service Choir.

Beyond music, Davis starred in Tyler Perry's stage plays Madea's Big Happy Family (2010) and A Madea Christmas (2011). Her career has also extended behind the scenes, working as a music supervisor on multiple television productions, including That Damn Michael Che, and the Netflix documentary Ladies First: A Story of Women in Hip-Hop.

== The Voice ==
Támar auditioned for season 10 of the American series The Voice.

Stage	Song	Original Artist	Date	Order	Result
Blind Audition	"Chain of Fools"	Aretha Franklin	March 8, 2016	4.1	Christina Aguilera and Blake Shelton turned Joined Team Christina
Battle Rounds	"Lady Marmalade" (vs. Shalyah Fearing)	Labelle	March 15, 2016	7.1	Saved by Coach
Knockout Rounds	"Lay Me Down" (vs. Maya Smith)	Sam Smith	March 29, 2016	11.3	Saved by Coach
Live Playoffs (Top 24)	"Rise Up"	Andra Day	April 11, 2016	14.8	Eliminated

== Discography ==
- Milk & Honey (2006) (limited US & Japan release only)
- My Name Is Tamar (2011)
- I Am the Storm (2016)
- My Name Is Ashley (2021)
