= Kata Hay =

American country music performer (born 1987)

- Born: Kata Huddleston; Skiatook, Oklahoma, U.S.
- Genre: Country
- Occupations: Singer, songwriter
- Instruments: Vocals, guitar, piano, mandolin, bass
- Years active: 1989–present

Kata Hay (born January 19, 1987) is an American country music performer, best known for competing on the 2016 season of The Voice.

== Early life ==
Hay was born in Skiatook, Oklahoma in 1987.

== Singing career ==
Hay began singing at the age of two after being inspired by a friend who she watched sing while competing in a beauty pageant, motivating her to enter a similar competition. After her father agreed to pay the $50 nomination fee, Hay performed the Hank Williams song, "Hey, Good Lookin'" and won the pageant which allowed her to compete in the finals held in Georgia. Hay went onto perform at other local events and talent shows.

Organizers of one of the talent shows sent videos of the competitors to Ed McMahon's Star Search, which led to Hay being invited to appear on the show. After her performance on Star Search received two perfect scores, defeating challenger Anna Nardona and winning the grand prize for the Under 12's category, becoming the youngest person to win.

Hay then became a hall of fame inductee of the Oklahoma Opry, and won five international yodeling championships. Hay was also the sole recipient of the Grant Leftwich Legacy Award issued by the Rodeo Opry.

At the age of 10, Hay appeared in the 1988 independent film Oklahoma Faded Love in which she sang the Patsy Cline version of "Crazy" as she played a younger version of the lead character.

Additionally, Hay has also appeared in several television commercials, Willie George Ministries short films and has done radio voice overs for Tulsa radio station KVOO-FM.

When Hay was 13, she began to experiment with the Western swing subgenre of country music. In 2000, she attended the Patsy Montana music festival in Arkansas. After entering the Patsy National National Yodeling Championship at the event, Hay was named champion. Montana's biographer, Jane Frost, said of Hay that day: "She stepped up to the microphone... and smiled like the pixie we knew as Patsy; as Kata strummed her guitar and sang "I Want to Be a Cowboy's Sweetheart", we knew the music, the life and the career... of Patsy Montana would live on."

Hay then traveled the United States and was billed as a featured artist at Fan Fair 2000, held in Nashville during June, 2000.

=== Recording ===
Hay has recorded three albums.

“Cowboys, Guitars and a Lil Bit of Swing" made it to No. 1 on the Western Music Charts. Two of Hay's original songs from the album made it into the Top 5 singles chart.

After touring Australia in 2004 and 2005, Hay was hired to perform in Fiddler's Feast Dinner Theater in Pigeon Forge in Tennessee which is where she met her former husband Robbie Helton. Hay and Helton decided to leave the theater after one year to concentrate on their own original music, and formed the band Kata & The Blaze.

After writing material, Kata & The Blaze released their debut album, Reckless in 2007, which was followed by an EP called Remember That Summer in 2009. During this period, Hay and Helton also founded the bluegrass rock band The Grassabillies which also spawned an album called Here Come The Grassabillies released in 2009.

During this period, Hay and Helton became the featured house band entertainers at Dolly Parton's Dixie Stampede in 2008.

In 2011, Hay began performing the popular Hatfield & McCoy dinner show in Pigeon Forge, performing several shows each night.

Hay was named the Dolly Parton Mountain Soul Vocal Champion in 2013 for her version of Parton's "I Will Always Love You", before she toured the United Kingdom in 2014.

=== Online Success ===
After Hay began her own YouTube channel in late 2008, she used it to perform the Taylor Swift song "Hey Stephen".

Swift later revealed Hay's version was one of her four favourite versions of the song, and posted it onto her website which caused a swell in the number of subscribers to Hay's YouTube channel, prompting Hay and Helton to both quit working at the Dixie Stampede to attempt to make a living playing their own music.

In August 2010, Hay submitted her version of Lisa Lavie’s song "Angel" after Lavie hosted an "Angel Cover Contest" on her own YouTube channel. Lavie selected Hay's cover as one of the best Top 3 versions, for which Hay won a video camera as a prize.

The same month Hay also won the chance to co-write a song with Kina Grannis, along with three other YouTube users.

=== Popular culture ===
Hay's song "Western Way" from "Cowboys, Guitars and a Lil' Bit of Swing" is heard during the opening scenes of the 2009 romantic comedy Coyote County Loser starring Nikki Boyer.

In October 2010, Hay was selected to be a part of the regular pre-show entertainment on both Jimmy Kimmel Live! and The Tonight Show with Jay Leno.

Hay also appeared on Let's Make a Deal with Wayne Brady in 2011.

In January 2011, Hay was announced as a finalist in the international search for a performer to sing the Shake Weight jingle, placing 3rd in the competition.

=== The Voice ===
After four previous attempts to compete but failing to pass the initial audition stages, Hay was invited to audition again for American television program The Voice. As a result, Hay finally made it to the "blind auditions" on the 10th season of the show.

Her blind audition went to air on March 1, 2016. Near the conclusion of her performance of the Gretchen Wilson song "Redneck Woman", three of the four coaches turned their chairs, Christina Aguilera, Adam Levine and Pharrell Williams. Country singer Blake Shelton was the only coach not to turn. Hay revealed that she had previously performed with Shelton as a young child.

Hay selected Aguilera to be her coach after admitting Aguilera was her first "girl crush" which prompted a light-hearted moment where the two women briefly kissed. Hay progressed through the competition to the Top 20 after defeating Chelsea Gann in the battle rounds and Joe Maye in the knockout rounds.

Hay was ultimately eliminated on April 11, 2016 during Week 1 of the live playoffs, after performing the Aretha Franklin song "(You Make Me Feel Like) A Natural Woman".

== Present ==
Hay is continuing to perform, record music and tour, and is expected to perform at several shows in Australia in September and October 2017.

== Personal life ==
Hay was previously married to musician Robbie Helton, whom she married at the age of 18.

== Legal issues ==
Hay was sentenced to 6 months in jail after being charged with sexual contact with a minor in June 2022.

In December 2025, Hay was arrested and charged with vehicular homicide.

== Discography ==
=== Albums ===
Title	Details
High in the Saddle	Release date: 2003, Dec 30, 2005 (iTunes); Label: Independent; Formats: CD, music download
Cowboys, Guitars, and a Lil Bit of Swing	Release date: Nov 1, 2004; Label: Independent; Formats: CD, music download
