= Emily Keener =

American musician

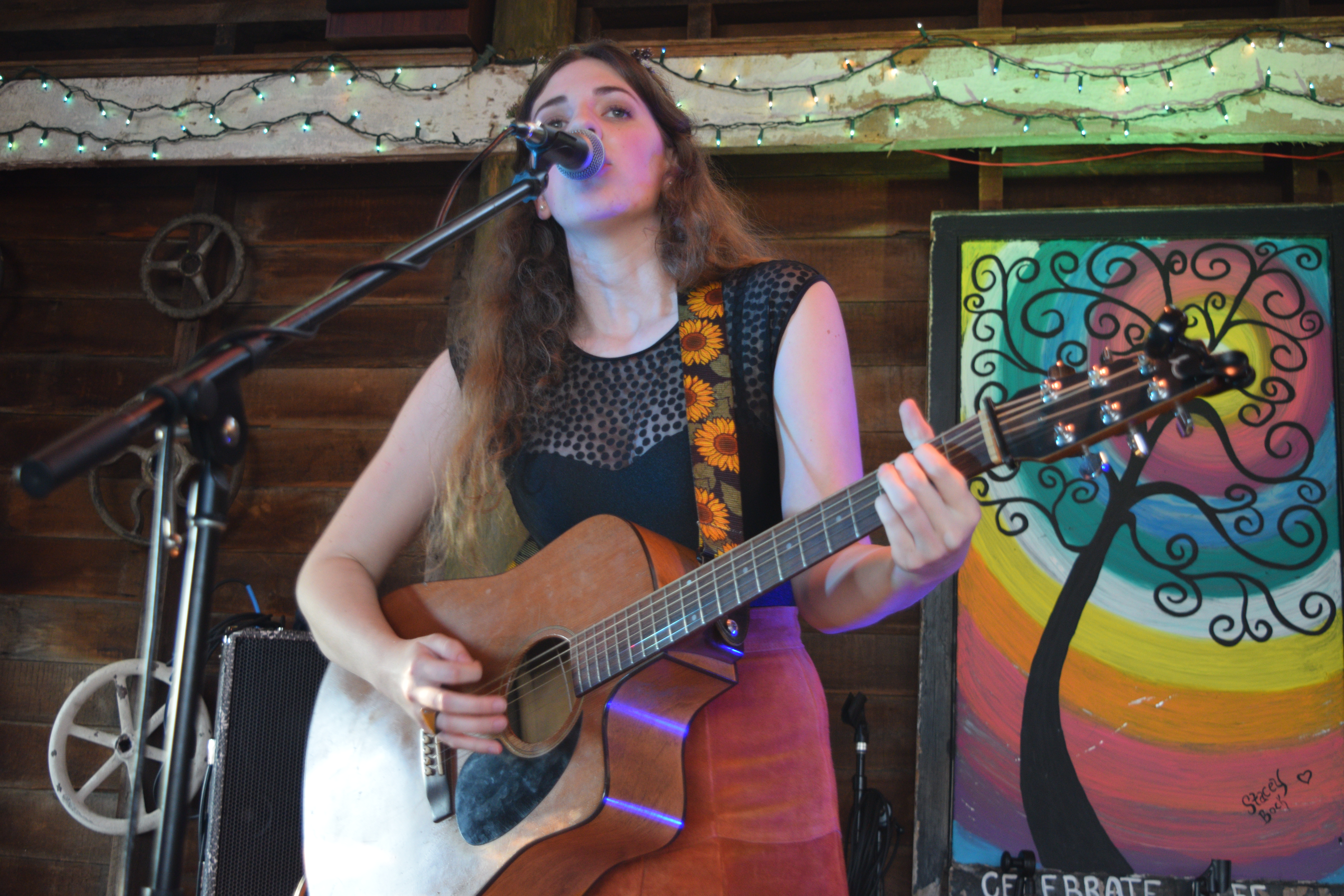
- Emily Keener performing at Bock's Juke Joint in Amherst, Ohio during the 7th annual Bocktoberfest

Background information
- Born: Emily Keener; November 23, 1998 (age 27); Cleveland, Ohio, U.S.
- Genres: Folk; folk rock; indie pop
- Occupations: Singer, songwriter
- Instruments: Vocals, guitar, piano, harp

Emily Christine Keener (born November 23, 1998) is an American singer and songwriter. She started performing solo shows when she was 12. She became a contestant on season 10 of NBC's The Voice, in 2016 at the age of 16. She advanced to the Top 12 before being eliminated.

== Life and career ==
Keener was born in Cleveland, Ohio and later moved to Avon Lake, Ohio in 2004, and finally moved to a 37-acre farm in Wakeman, Ohio in 2007, at eight years old. Keener taught herself to play guitar when she was around the age of ten. At eleven, she was writing songs, and by age twelve she was playing at area wineries and restaurants. Her father has greatly influenced her preferences for music, exposing her to a variety of styles and genres. Keener has stated that she struggles with depression, and that writing music provides an outlet for her to cope.

In 2013, Keener released an album, A Book of New Beginnings, through iTunes. On June 11, 2016, Keener released a single titled "Elevator" through Bandcamp., which was later included on her album Breakfast, released November 18, 2016.

On May 22, 2020, Keener independently released her second album, I Do Not Have To Be Good.

== The Voice ==
Keener auditioned for season 10 of The Voice, and turned the chairs of all four coaches. She chose Pharrell Williams as her coach. She won her battle against Jonathan Bach, which aired on March 21, 2016 with the song "Explosions." Her knockout against Shalyah Fearing aired on March 28, 2016; she won her knockout and advanced to the Live Playoffs. Williams used his coach save in the Playoffs to advance Keener to the Top 12, where she was eliminated.

| Stage | Date | Order | Song | Result |
|---|---|---|---|---|
| Blind Audition | Tuesday March 1, 2016 | 2.6 | "Goodbye Yellow Brick Road" | All four coaches turned Joined Team Pharrell |
| Battle Rounds | Monday March 21, 2016 | 8.2 | "Explosions" (vs. Jonathan Bach) | Saved by Coach |
| Knockout Rounds | Monday March 28, 2016 | 10.6 | "Big Yellow Taxi" (vs. Shalyah Fearing) | Saved by Coach |
| Live Playoffs | Tuesday April 12, 2016 | 15.2 | "Still Crazy After All These Years" | Saved by Coach |
| Top 12 | Monday April 18, 2016 | 17.4 | "Lilac Wine" | Eliminated |
| Top 12 | Tuesday April 19, 2016 | 18.1 | "Blue Eyes Crying in the Rain" | Eliminated |
