= Curly Sue =

1991 film by John Hughes

- Theatrical release poster
- Directed by: John Hughes
- Written by: John Hughes
- Produced by: John Hughes
- Starring: James Belushi; Kelly Lynch; Alisan Porter
- Cinematography: Jeffrey L. Kimball
- Edited by: Peck Prior; Harvey Rosenstock
- Music by: Georges Delerue
- Production company: Hughes Entertainment
- Distributed by: Warner Bros. Pictures
- Release date: October 25, 1991
- Running time: 102 minutes
- Country: United States
- Language: English
- Budget: $25 million
- Box office: $33.7 million

Curly Sue is a 1991 American comedy drama film written, produced, and directed by John Hughes, in his final directing role for a film before his death in 2009, and starring James Belushi, Kelly Lynch and Alisan Porter with Steve Carell in his film debut. It tells the story of a homeless con artist and his young orphan companion who gain shelter with a rich divorce lawyer. The film was released by Warner Bros. Pictures on October 25, 1991 and received generally negative reviews from critics while grossing $33.7 million against a $25 million budget.

== Plot ==
Bill Dancer and his young companion 7-year-old Curly Sue, an orphaned girl who Bill took in as a baby, are homeless folks with hearts of gold. Their scams are aimed not at turning a profit but at getting enough to eat. One night, while they are sleeping at a shelter, Sue's tin ring, which was left to her by her late mother, is stolen and pawned by a drifter.

After moving from Detroit to Chicago, the duo succeed in conning a rich divorce lawyer named Grey Ellison into believing she backed her Mercedes into Bill. When Grey accidentally collides with Bill for real the following night, she insists on putting the two up for the night over the objections of her snotty boyfriend Walker McCormick. After a confrontation exposing the con, Bill admits the truth and tells Grey it's time for him and Sue to move on. Thinking Bill has been abusing Sue by using her in his cons, Grey demands that the girl stay with her, but Bill will not leave Sue. Grey lets them stay when she understands the precarious position the homeless pair are in.

Walker, out of spite, turns them in, and Sue is taken away by child protective services, while Bill is arrested because he never had custody of the child. While in jail, he encounters the drifter who stole Sue's ring and forces him to reveal what he did with it. Grey arrives to get Bill out of jail and has also gotten Sue out of state care.

After learning that the drifter took the ring to a pawn shop and sold it, Bill buys it back. Sue and Grey return to their apartment and discover the ring, which Sue takes as a sign that Bill has decided the time has come for them to part. However, the ring is accompanied by a note saying Bill is in the living room.

Grey and Bill legally adopt Sue and are subsequently married. The film ends with them dropping Sue off on her first day of school.

== Cast ==
- Alisan Porter as Curly Sue
- James Belushi as Bill Dancer
- Kelly Lynch as Grey Ellison
- John Getz as Walker McCormick
- Fred Thompson as Bernard Oxbar
- Branscombe Richmond as Albert
- Gail Boggs as Anise Hall
- Viveka Davis as Trina
- Barbara Tarbuck as Mrs. Arnold
- Cameron Thor as Maître d'
- Edie McClurg as Secretary
- Steve Carell as Tesio (credited as Steven Carell; in his film acting debut)
- Burke Byrnes as Dr. Maxwell
- John Ashton as Mr. Frank Arnold (uncredited)
- Ralph Foody as Drifter

== Production ==
Lead actress Kelly Lynch agreed to do the film as she saw it as a kind of "throwback to one of those Depression-era movies that you'd see Jean Harlow in: A rich lady ends up taking in this little orphan." According to Lynch, at the time she signed on to the project, it was initially intended to co-star Alec Baldwin (whom had worked with Hughes on She's Having a Baby) and Kevin Spacey in the parts later played by James Belushi and John Getz, respectively. Though she loved working with Hughes, calling his vision "very precise" but also organic, she claimed that he and Belushi did not get along. "I kind of felt like a mom dealing with two 12-year-old boys," she said. "What I thought would be this cute, sweet little movie experience ended up going on for something like five months, and so much money was spent. It was insane."

== Release ==
The film debuted at No. 2 at the box office with a gross of $4,974,958 on 1,634 screens. The following weekend it increased its weekend gross by seven percent to $5.3 million from the same number of screens and remained in second place. In its third weekend it continued on the same number of screens and managed to move into first place, taking more in its third week than in its first or second. Its final gross in the U.S. and Canada was $33,691,313.

=== Home media ===
Warner Home Video released it on VHS and Laserdisc in 1992 and later on DVD on June 1, 2004, with commentary and an introduction by Porter on special features.

== Reception ==
The film received mostly negative reviews from critics. On Rotten Tomatoes, Curly Sue holds a 13% rating based on 15 reviews, with an average rating of 3.7/10. Audiences surveyed by CinemaScore gave the film a grade of "B+" on scale of A+ to F.

Leonard Maltin gave it one and a half stars out of four in his Movie Guide, and called it "A John Hughes formula movie where the formula doesn't work".

Halliwell's Film Guide calls it "Gruesomely sentimental and manipulative".

Nigel Andrews of the Financial Times declared, "John Hughes here graduates from the most successful comedy in film history to scripting and directing a large piece of non-biodegradable tosh."

Roger Ebert gave the film three out of four stars, complimenting "the quiet humor and the warmth of the actors." He said the movie is "not great and it's not deep, but it sure does have a heart." On At the Movies, Ebert's colleague Gene Siskel disagreed sharply, saying he was "floored" that Ebert both gave the film a good review and compared it favorably to Planes, Trains and Automobiles. Siskel called Curly Sue "unctuous" and said there was "no chemistry whatsoever" between Belushi and Lynch, and gave the film a "thumbs down."
