= Wakeman, Ohio =

- Village
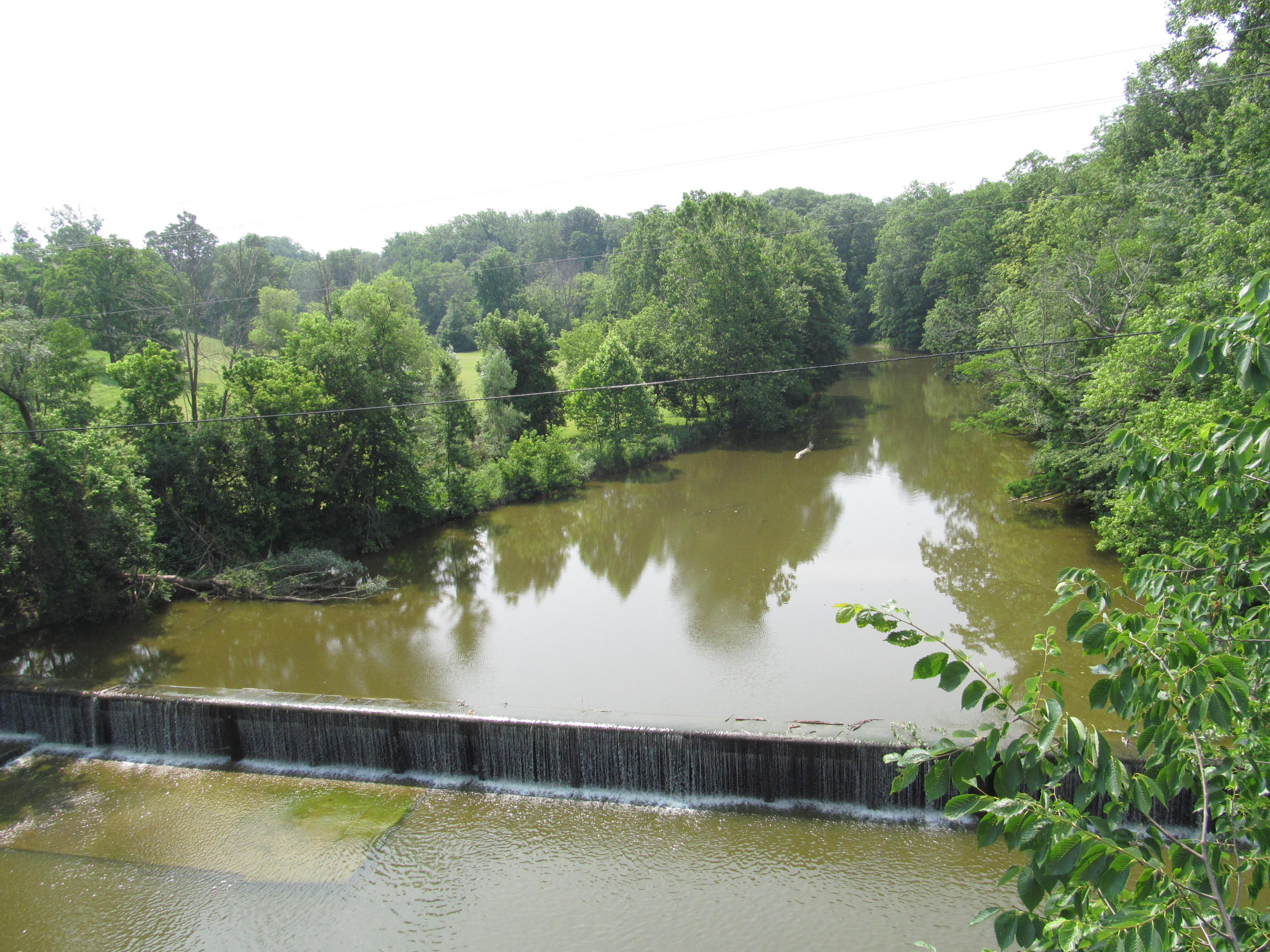
- Dam on the Vermilion River

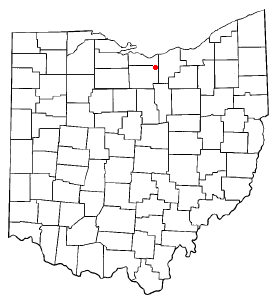
- Location of Wakeman, Ohio

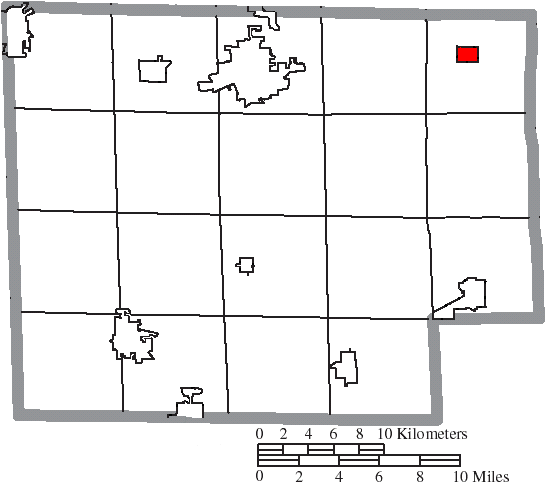
- Location of Wakeman in Huron County
- Coordinates: 41°15′05″N 82°24′10″W
- Country: United States
- State: Ohio
- County: Huron

Area
  - Total: 0.85 sq mi (2.19 km^{2})
  - Land: 0.83 sq mi (2.14 km^{2})
  - Water: 0.023 sq mi (0.06 km^{2})
- Elevation: 863 ft (263 m)

Population (2020)
  - Total: 990
  - Density: 1,200.6/sq mi (463.55/km^{2})
- Time zone: UTC-5 (Eastern (EST))
  - Summer (DST): UTC-4 (EDT)
- ZIP code: 44889
- Area code: 440
- FIPS code: 39-80458
- GNIS feature ID: 2400081
- Website: https://www.wakemanohio.com/

Wakeman is a village in Huron County, Ohio, United States, along the Vermilion River. Its namesake was Jesup Wakeman, an early settler of Fairfield County, Connecticut, who was involved in western land speculation between 1800 and 1840. The population was 990 at the 2020 census.

== Geography ==
According to the United States Census Bureau, the village has a total area of 0.85 square miles (2.20 km^{2}), of which 0.83 square miles (2.15 km^{2}) is land and 0.02 square miles (0.05 km^{2}) is water. The surface of Wakeman and the surrounding township is generally rolling. The soil is sandy and loamy with more clay content in some portions of the land.

== History ==
According to Underground Railroad historian Wilbur H. Siebert, "Leverett B. Hill, of Wakeman, Ohio, assisted 103 [freedom seekers] on their way to Canada during the year 1852."

Rev. Dr. Charles C. Creegan was born in Ohio and was ordained in 1874. He was pastor of a congregational church in Wakeman, Ohio for five years. He went on to do missionary work and served as president of Fargo College.

A type of sandstone identified as Wakeman Buff or spider web sandstone was once quarried in Wakeman. A quarry operated by the Cleveland Stone Company in northern Wakeman between 1877 and circa late 1910s or early 1920s was also known for quarrying Berea Sandstone.

After Garrett Morgan sold his traffic signal patent in 1923, he used the proceeds to purchase over a hundred acres of farmland near Wakeman where he established an all black Wakeman Country Club.

During the 1930s and 1940s, Wakeman was home to the semi-pro baseball team, the Wakeman Red Caps. They played at Wakeman Field. The team grew out of the Wakeman Baseball Club which had been established in 1889.

== Demographics ==
Historical population
Census	Pop.	Note	%±
1930	452		—
1940	522		15.5%
1950	620		18.8%
1960	728		17.4%
1970	822		12.9%
1980	906		10.2%
1990	948		4.6%
2000	951		0.3%
2010	1,047		10.1%
2020	990		−5.4%
U.S. Decennial Census

=== 2010 census ===
As of the census of 2010, there were 1,047 people, 402 households, and 288 families living in the village. The population density was 1,261.4 inhabitants per square mile (487.0/km^{2}). There were 441 housing units at an average density of 531.3 per square mile (205.1/km^{2}). The racial makeup of the village was 99.0% White, 0.2% African American, 0.1% Native American, 0.1% from other races, and 0.6% from two or more races. Hispanic or Latino of any race were 1.2% of the population.

There were 402 households, of which 38.3% had children under the age of 18 living with them, 54.0% were married couples living together, 12.4% had a female householder with no husband present, 5.2% had a male householder with no wife present, and 28.4% were non-families. 21.9% of all households were made up of individuals, and 9.2% had someone living alone who was 65 years of age or older. The average household size was 2.60 and the average family size was 3.03.

The median age in the village was 36.7 years. 28.7% of residents were under the age of 18; 5.6% were between the ages of 18 and 24; 28% were from 25 to 44; 26.5% were from 45 to 64; and 11.3% were 65 years of age or older. The gender makeup of the village was 48.0% male and 52.0% female.

=== 2000 census ===
As of the census of 2000, there were 951 people, 359 households, and 268 families living in the village. The population density was 1,195.9 inhabitants per square mile (461.7/km^{2}). There were 374 housing units at an average density of 470.3 per square mile (181.6/km^{2}). The racial makeup of the village was 99.05% White, 0.32% from other races, and 0.63% from two or more races. Hispanic or Latino of any race were 0.95% of the population.

There were 359 households, out of which 39.6% had children under the age of 18 living with them, 60.7% were married couples living together, 10.6% had a female householder with no husband present, and 25.1% were non-families. 20.3% of all households were made up of individuals, and 9.7% had someone living alone who was 65 years of age or older. The average household size was 2.65 and the average family size was 3.08.

In the village, the population was spread out, with 28.1% under the age of 18, 7.9% from 18 to 24, 30.0% from 25 to 44, 23.3% from 45 to 64, and 10.7% who were 65 years of age or older. The median age was 36 years. For every 100 females there were 97.7 males. For every 100 females age 18 and over, there were 90.5 males.

The median income for a household in the village was $50,125, and the median income for a family was $55,500. Males had a median income of $36,458 versus $24,028 for females. The per capita income for the village was $18,559. About 1.1% of families and 3.2% of the population were below the poverty line, including 0.8% of those under age 18 and 5.8% of those age 65 or over.

== Education ==
Public education for Wakeman is administered by Western Reserve Local School District.

Wakeman is served by a branch of the Huron County Community Library.

== Notable people ==
- Andrew Chafin, relief pitcher for the Texas Rangers (baseball) and other teams throughout his career.
- Leander Clark, Iowa politician
- Emily Keener, singer/songwriter, participant on NBC's The Voice
- DeWitt C. Wilson, Wisconsin politician
- Chad Fairchild, umpire
- Link Wasem, Wakeman Red Caps baseball player
