= Down That Road (Alisan Porter song) =

Single by Alisan Porter
- Released: May 23, 2016
- Recorded: Universal Music Group
- Genre: Country, Soft rock
- Length: 3:10
- Songwriters: Alisan Porter; Ilsey Juber; Ely Rise
- Producer: Christina Aguilera

Alisan Porter singles chronology
"Down That Road" (2016)	"Deep Water" (2017)

"Down That Road" is a song by American pop, country & rock singer Alisan Porter. It was Porter's coronation single following her victory on the tenth season of the singing competition The Voice.

== Chart performance ==
"Down That Road" debuted at number 100 on US Billboard Hot 100 chart for the second week beginning on June 11, 2016.

== Formats and track listings ==
- Digital download
1. "Down That Road (The Voice Performance)"– 3:52

== Charts ==
Chart (2016)	Peak position
US Hot 100	100

== Release history ==
Country	Date	Format	Label	Ref.
United States	23 May 2016	Digital download	Republic Records	
