= Births in 2000 =

The following is a list of notable births in 2000.

== January–April ==
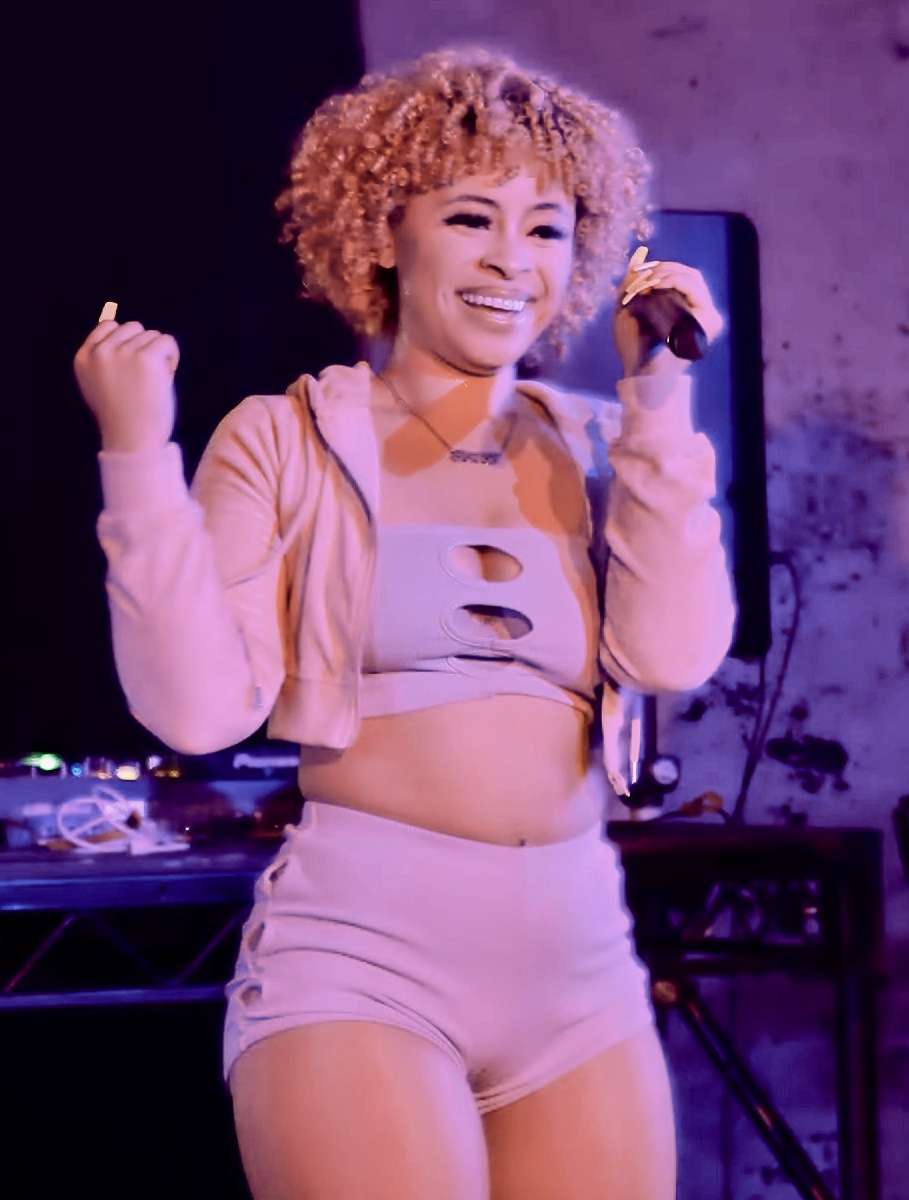
Ice Spice

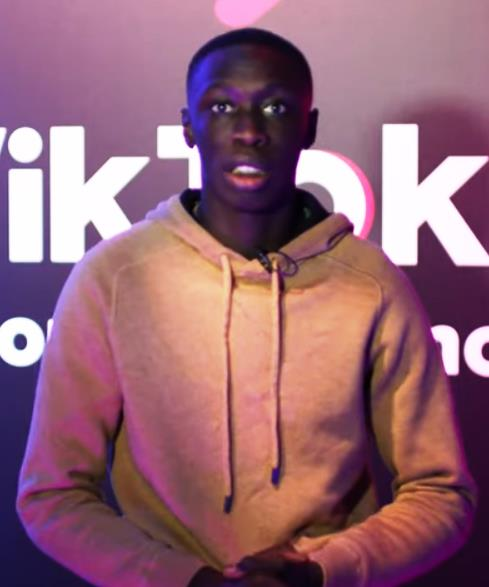
Khaby Lame

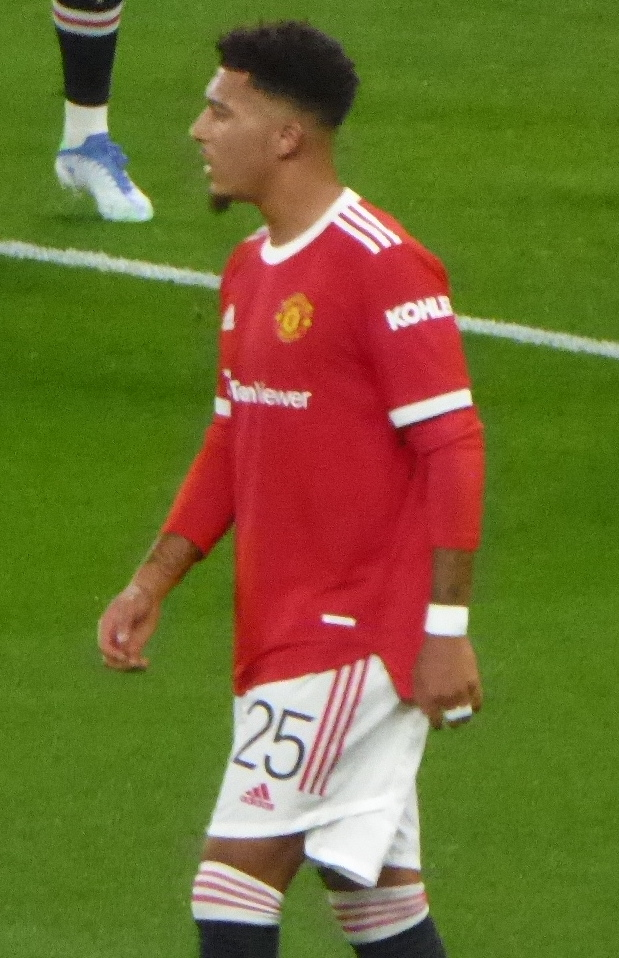
Jadon Sancho

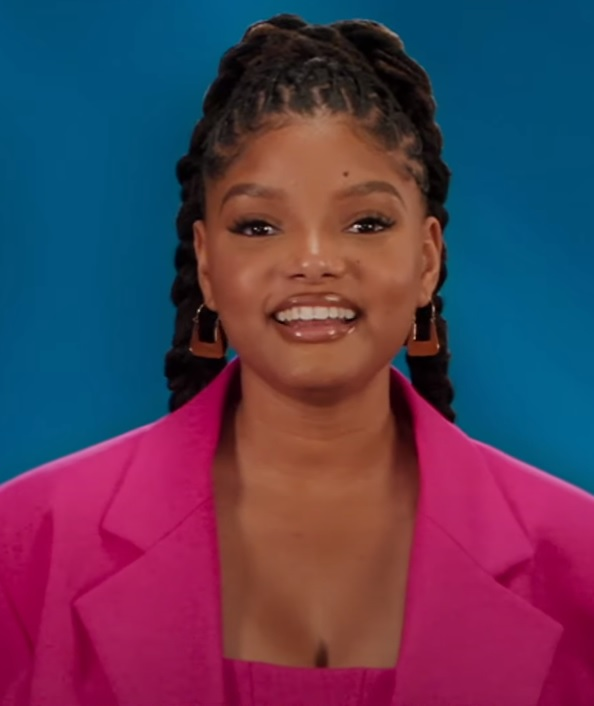
Halle Bailey

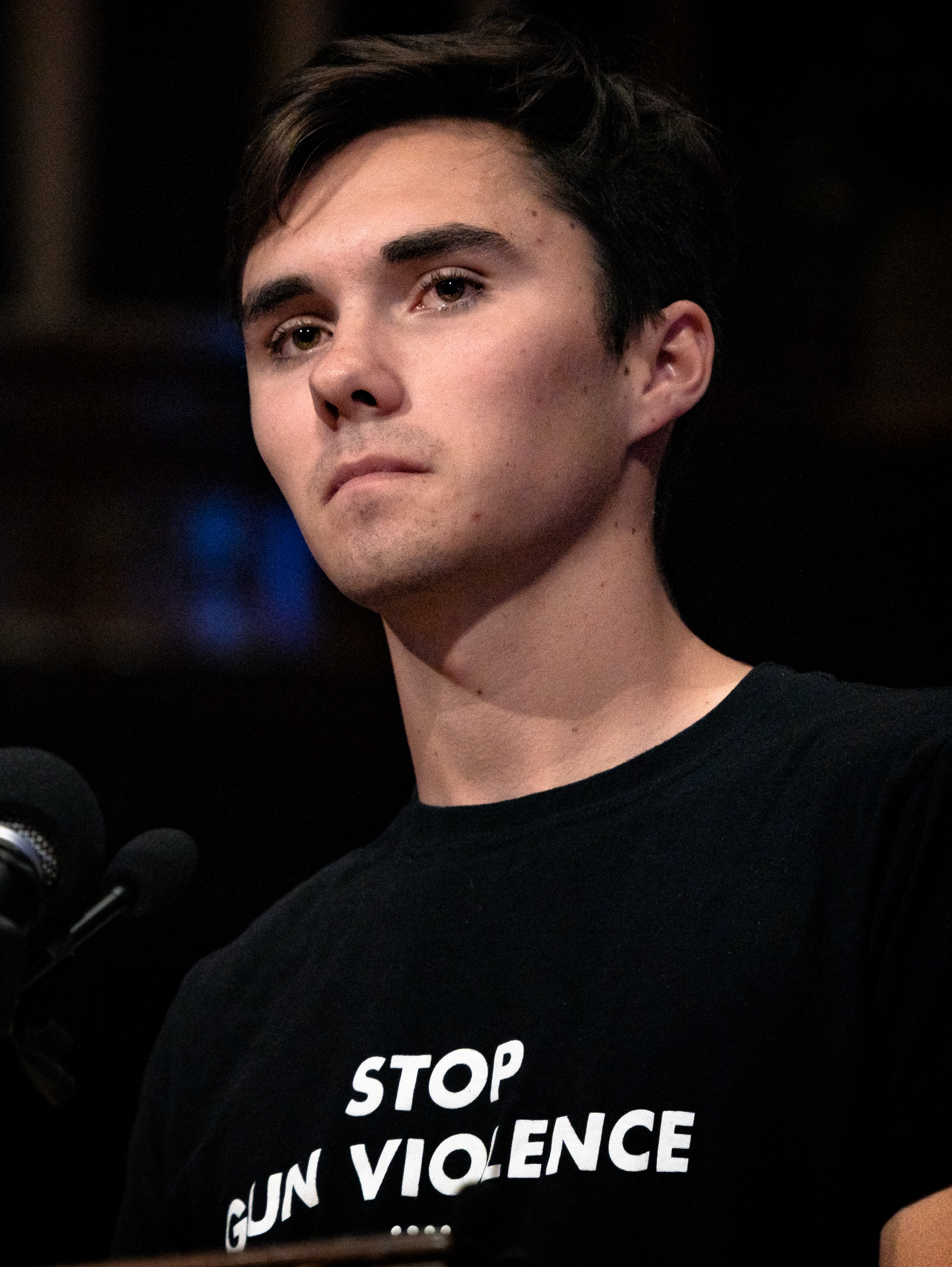
David Hogg

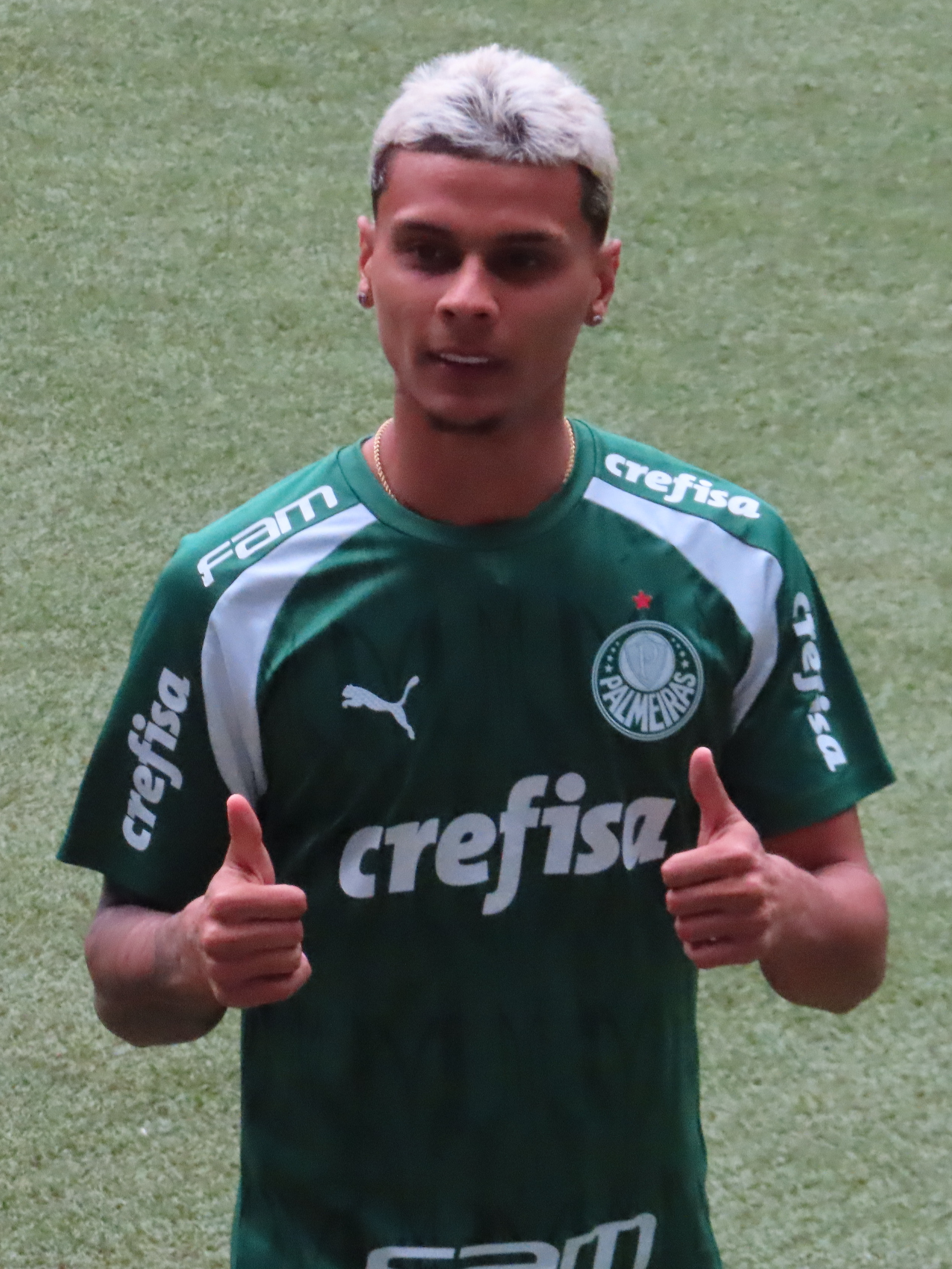
Richard Ríos

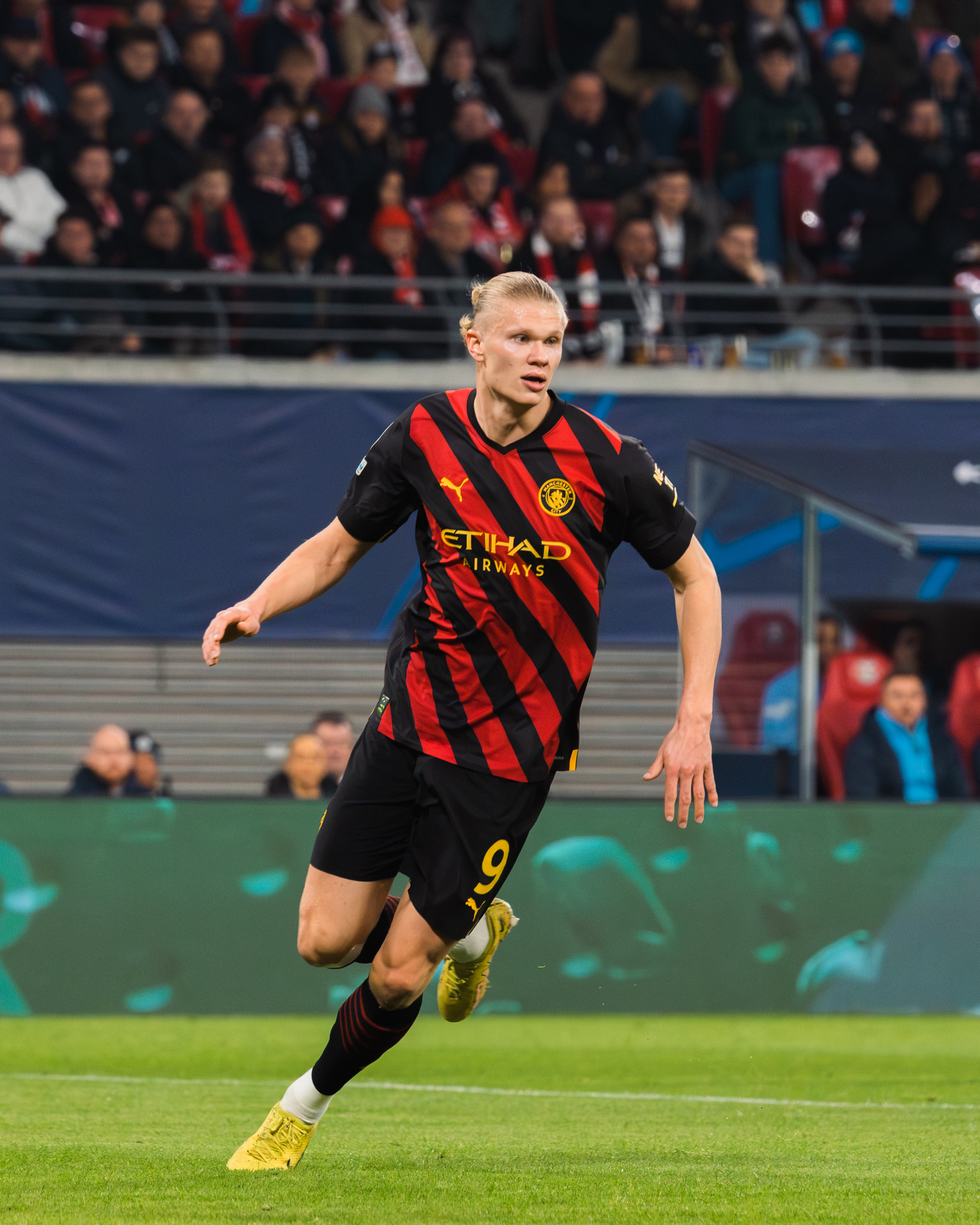
Erling Haaland

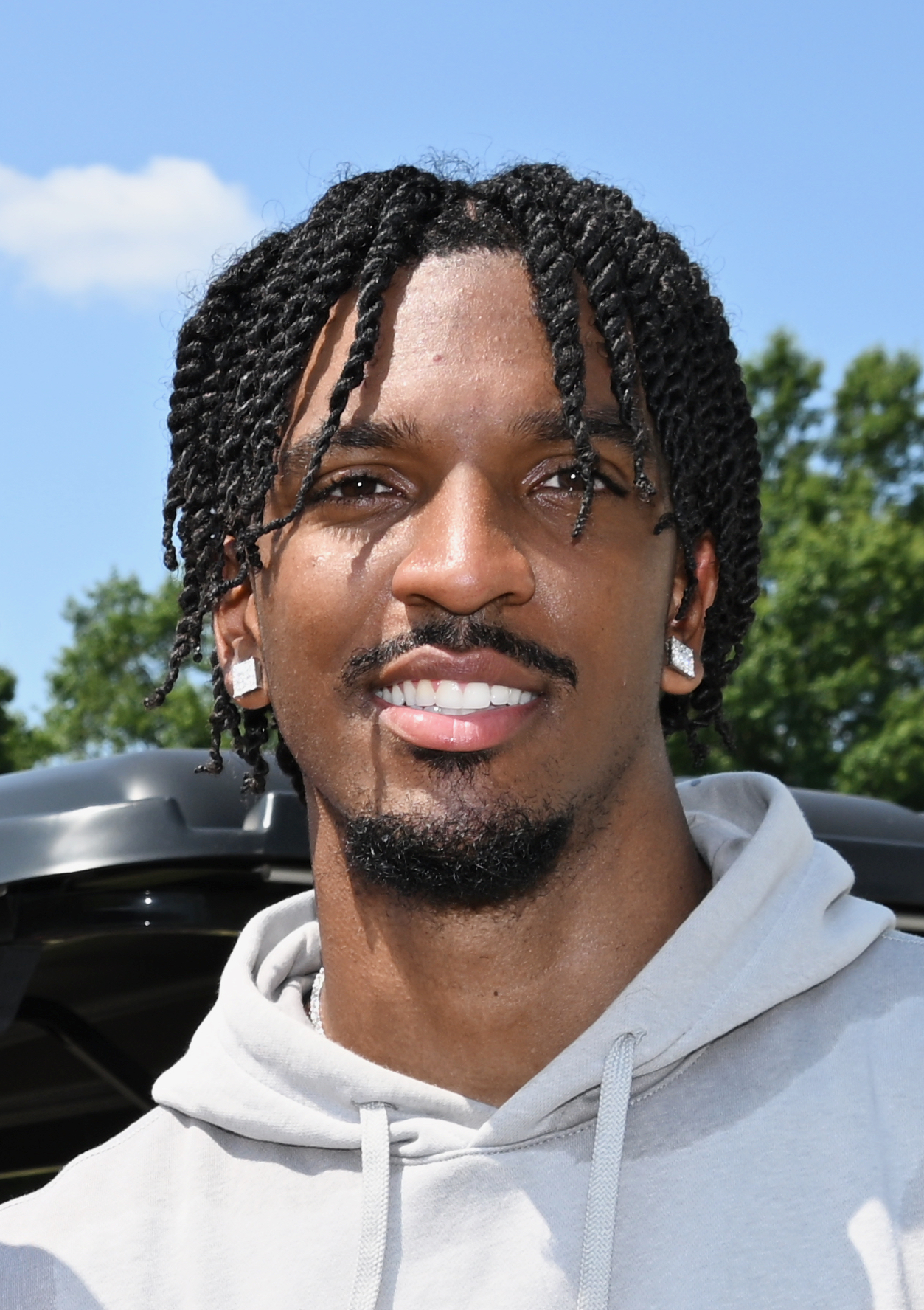
Jayden Daniels

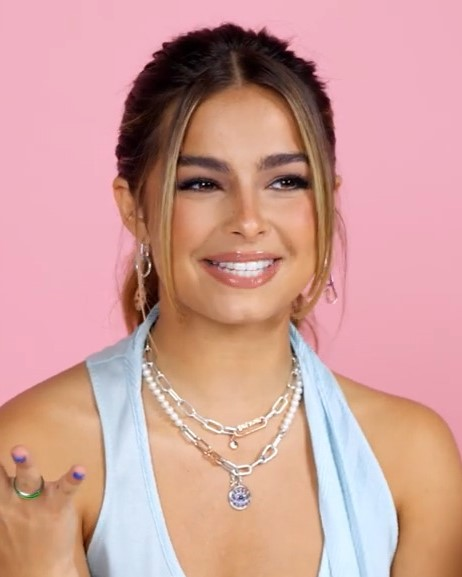
Addison Rae

- January 1
- Ice Spice, American rapper
- Odetari, American rapper, singer, songwriter, and record producer
- Wennely Quezada, American singer (3Quency)
- January 8 – Noah Cyrus, American singer and actress
- January 10 – Reneé Rapp, American actress and singer
- January 18 – Jenna Butler (soccer), American professional soccer player
- January 20 – Selemon Barega, Ethiopian long-distance runner
- January 27 – Bailey Zimmerman, Multi-platinum american country singer and songwriter
- January 28 – Helen J. Shen, American actress and singer
- January 30 – Benee, New Zealand singer
- February 4 – Gigi Perez, American singer-songwriter
- February 5 – Jordan Nagai, American retired child voice actor of Russell in Up
- February 10
- Yara Shahidi, American actress, model and producer
- Jonathan Mergui, Israeli singer, actor and dancer
- February 19 – Chavoso da USP, Brazilian professor, lecturer and YouTuber
- February 22 – Connor Storrie, American actor
- February 23 – Femke Broeders-Bol, Dutch hurdler and sprinter
- February 26 – Alexa Ilacad, Filipina actress and singer
- March 9 – Khaby Lame, Senegalese-Italian social media personality
- March 14 – Chrisean Rock, American rapper and reality television personality
- March 21
- Jace Norman, American actor
- Tommy Richman, – American singer and rapper
- March 25 – Jadon Sancho, English footballer
- March 27 – Halle Bailey, American singer and actress
- March 31 – Ruby Cruz, American actress
- April 5 – Rhea Raj, Indian-American singer-songwriter
- April 12
- David Hogg, American gun control activist
- Manuel Turizo, Colombian singer and songwriter
- April 23 – Chloe Kim, American snowboarder

== May–August ==
- May 1 – Rema, Nigerian musician and songwriter
- May 2 – Tom Dean, British swimmer
- May 28 – Phil Foden, English footballer
- May 29 – Adam Zdrójkowski, Polish actor and television presenter
- May 30 – Jared S. Gilmore, American actor and streamer
- May 31 – Gable Steveson, American wrestler
- June 2 – Richard Ríos, Colombian footballer
- June 3 – Beabadoobee, Filipino-British singer and songwriter
- June 6 - Lauren Ingram, Argentine actress
- June 17 – Odessa A'zion, American actress
- July 6 – Zion Williamson, American basketball player
- July 9 – Mxmtoon, American singer-songwriter and YouTuber
- July 12 – Vinícius Júnior, Brazilian footballer
- July 21 – Erling Haaland, Norwegian footballer
- July 25 – Meg Donnelly, American actress
- August 6 – Adam Zadražil, Czech professional footballer
- August 17
- Lil Pump, American rapper
- Thomas Headon, British-born Australian singer-songwriter
- August 24 – Brianna Mazzola, American singer and actress (3Quency)

== September–December ==
- September 3 – Ashley Boettcher, American actress
- September 11 – Mark Nawaqanitawase, Australian rugby union and rugby league player
- September 17 – Jared Penning, American football player
- September 18 – Alex Warren, American singer, songwriter, youtuber, and influencer
- September 28 – Frankie Jonas, American singer and actor
- October 5 – Addison Rae, American social media personality and singer
- October 9 – Harrison Burton, American race car driver
- October 11 – Adin Ross, American online streamer
- October 13 – Anastasia Kingsnorth, British YouTuber
- October 30 – Jeffery Xiong, American chess prodigy
- October 31 – Willow Smith, American singer and actress
- November 2 – Alphonso Davies, Canadian soccer player
- November 5 – Yuval Raphael, Israeli singer
- November 10 – Mackenzie Foy, American actress and model
- November 21 – Isabel May, American actress
- November 22
- Auliʻi Cravalho, American actress and singer
- Baby Ariel, American social media personality
- November 30 – Jane Paknia, American musician
- December 18 – Jayden Daniels, American football player
- December 22 – Joshua Bassett, American actor and singer

== See also ==
Category:2000 births
