= Afterglow (EP) =

EP by Midnight 'Til Morning
- Released: October 8, 2025
- Studio: Recliner
- Genre: Pop rock
- Length: 19:50
- Label: Chugg Music

Alternative cover
- Afterglow (Unplugged) edition cover

Singles from Afterglow
- 1. "Bye" Released: August 20, 2025; 2. "Navy Eyes" Released: September 10, 2025; 3. "Heart on Fire" Released: October 9, 2025

Afterglow is the debut extended play (EP) by Australian-American pop-rock band Midnight 'Til Morning, released on October 8, 2025, through Chugg Music. Written and recorded in the months following the band's formation on the Netflix reality competition series Building the Band, the 7-track project blends hook-heavy contemporary pop with acoustic warmth and alternative rock edges.

== Background and recording ==
Following their appearance on Building the Band—where members Shane Appell, Zach Newbould, Conor Smith, and Mason Watts banded together—the group signed with Chugg Music. Moving quickly from the show's production wrap, the quartet convened in Sydney, Australia, spending two to three months writing and recording original material to transition away from being perceived solely as a reality television act. The project features production and co-writing contributions from prominent pop creators, including JT Daly and Amy Allen.

== Release and promotion ==
The EP was preceded by several promotional tracks and singles, including "Bye" and "Ghost of Us". To support the release, the band rolled out a series of live acoustic session recordings filmed at Château Wah Wah Studio in Sydney in collaboration with production crew Mude. On November 21, 2025, an Afterglow Deluxe edition was released, bundling the original 7 studio tracks alongside 5 acoustic renditions under the subtitle Afterglow (Unplugged). The release coincided with international touring supporting the band's debut campaign.

== Critical reception ==
Afterglow received generally positive reviews from music critics upon release, who praised it for defying expectations typically placed on television-formed groups. Reviewers highlighted its organic instrumentation, earnest songwriting, and cohesive blend of upbeat pop anthems with more introspective, guitar-driven cuts like "Ghost of Us" and "Navy Eyes".

== Track listing ==
All tracks are produced by Midnight Til Morning and associated collaborators. The tracks are all co-written by Midnight 'Til Morning, Benson Boone, Amy Allen, Scott Harris and Elie Rizk.

Afterglow track listing
No.	Title	Length
1.	"Bye"	2:18
2.	"Heart on Fire"	3:14
3.	"17"	2:51
4.	"Welcome to LA"	2:03
5.	"Navy Eyes"	2:46
6.	"Edge of Amazing"	3:22
7.	"Ghost of Us"	3:16
Total length:		19:50

Afterglow (Unplugged) track listing
No.	Title	Length
1.	"Ghost of Us (Acoustic)"	2:39
2.	"17 (Acoustic)"	2:47
3.	"Welcome to LA (Acoustic)"	2:21
4.	"Navy Eyes (Acoustic)"	2:48
5.	"Bye (Acoustic)"	2:23
Total length:		12:58

== Release history ==
Afterglow release history
Region	Date	Format(s)	Edition(s)	Label	Ref.
Various	October 8, 2025	Digital download; streaming	Standard	Chugg Music	
Various	November 21, 2025	Digital download; streaming	Unplugged	Chugg Music	

== Charts ==
Chart performance for Afterglow
Chart (2025)	Peak position
Australian Albums (ARIA)	16
