= Town of a Million Dreams =

Studio album by Casey Barnes
- Released: 17 April 2020
- Genre: Country
- Length: 33:02
- Label: Chugg Music
- Producers: MSquared (Michael Delozrenzis and Michael Paynter)

Casey Barnes chronology
The Good Life (2018)	Town of a Million Dreams (2020)	Light It Up (2022)

Town of a Million Dreams is the seventh studio album by Australian country singer Casey Barnes and was released on 17 April 2020 through Chugg Music. It was the first Barnes album released on the label, after signing with them in 2019. Town of a Million Dreams peaked at number 16 on the ARIA Albums Chart.

The album contained the singles "Sparks Fly", which speak eight consecutive weeks at number one on The Music Network Country Radio Charts and "We're Good Together", which spent five weeks atop the same chart.

At the 2020 ARIA Music Awards, the album was nominated for Best Country Album.

At the Country Music Awards of Australia of 2021, the album was nominated for Contemporary Country Album of the Year and Album of the Year.

== Track listing ==
1. "A Little More" – 3:19
2. "We're Good Together" – 2:59
3. "No Other You" – 3:33
4. "Sparks Fly" – 2:58
5. "Fine Wine" – 3:02
6. "All I Need" – 3:37
7. "Bright Lights" – 4:00
8. "Heartbreaker" – 2:54
9. "The Lucky Ones" – 3:04
10. "City Girls" – 3:36

== Charts ==
=== Weekly charts ===
Weekly chart performance for Town of a Million Dreams
Chart (2020)	Peak position
Australian Albums (ARIA)	16
Australian Country Albums (ARIA)	2

=== Year-end charts ===
Year-end chart performance for Town of a Million Dreams
Chart (2020)	Position
Australian Country Albums (ARIA)	90
