= Light It Up (Casey Barnes album) =

Studio album by Casey Barnes
- Released: 25 February 2022
- Genre: Country
- Length: 33:25
- Label: Chugg Music
- Producers: MSquared (Michael Delozrenzis and Michael Paynter)

Casey Barnes chronology
Town of a Million Dreams (2020)	Light It Up (2022)	Mayday (2024)

Light It Up is the eighth studio album by Australian country singer Casey Barnes, released on 25 February 2022 through Chugg Music. The album was announced on 10 November 2021 alongside a national tour that commenced on the album's day of release. It peaked at number 17 on the ARIA Albums Chart.

The album was preceded by the lead single "Come Turn Me On", which spent five weeks at number one on The Music Network CountryTown Hot50 chart and was the most played song on Australian country radio in 2021.

At the 2022 ARIA Music Awards, the album won the ARIA Award for Best Country Album.

At the Country Music Awards of Australia of 2023, the album won Album of the Year and Top Selling Australian Country Album of the Year.

At the AIR Awards of 2023, the album was nominated for Best Independent Country Album or EP.

== Reception ==
Zanda Wilson from The Music called the album "incredibly polished" and "undoubtedly one of Casey Barnes' most complete albums to date".

== Track listing ==
All songs written by Casey, MSquared, Kaci Brown and Sam Gray.

1. "Get to Know Ya" – 3:26
2. "Kiss Me Like You Mean It" – 3:07
3. "Small Town" – 3:42
4. "Come Turn Me On" – 3:05
5. "Light It Up" – 2:51
6. "Up in Flames" – 3:34
7. "God Took His Time on You" – 3:36
8. "Love Fool" – 3:32
9. "This Ain't the Encore" – 3:15
10. "Gone Gone Gone" – 3:17

== Charts ==
=== Weekly charts ===
Weekly chart performance for Light It Up
Chart (2022)	Peak position
Australian Albums (ARIA)	17
Australian Country Albums (ARIA)	2

=== Year-end charts ===
Year-end chart performance for Light It Up
Chart (2022)	Position
Australian Country Albums (ARIA)	20
