= Mayday (Casey Barnes album) =

Studio album by Casey Barnes
- Released: 31 May 2024
- Genre: Country
- Length: 30:28
- Labels: Casey Barnes, Chugg Music

Casey Barnes chronology
Light It Up (2022)	Mayday (2024)	Made for This (2026)

Mayday is the ninth studio album by Australian country singer Casey Barnes, released on 31 May 2024 through Chugg Music. The album peaked at number 11 on the ARIA Charts.

The album was preceded by the singles "Summer Nights", "Boys Like Me", "Never Give Up On a Good Time", "Miracles" and "Mayday".

At the 2024 ARIA Music Awards, the album was nominated for ARIA Award for Best Country Album.

At the Country Music Awards of Australia of 2025, the album won Contemporary Country Album of the Year and was nominated for Album of the Year.

== Track listing ==
1. "Mayday" - 2:25
2. "Summer Nights" - 2:52
3. "Boys Like Me" - 3:32
4. "Ain't No Better Buddy Than a Beer" - 2:46
5. "Never Give Up On a Good Time" - 3:18
6. "Everything We Need" - 3:02
7. "Country Folk" - 2:53
8. "Miracles" - 3:04
9. "She's Mine" - 3:36
10. "Back in Time" - 3:03

== Charts ==
Weekly chart performance for Mayday
Chart (2024)	Peak position
Australian Albums (ARIA)	11
Australian Country Albums (ARIA)	2

=== Year-end charts ===
Year-end chart performance for Mayday
Chart (2024)	Position
Australian Country Albums (ARIA)	56
