= Michael Chugg =

Australian tour promoter

Michael Chugg AM
- Born: Michael Glenn Chugg; 15 June 1947 (age 79); Launceston, Tasmania, Australia
- Occupations: Tour promoter, entrepreneur
- Years active: 1964–present
- Spouses: Liselotte Reisner (m. 1970; div. 1983) Lisa Slattery (m. 1987; div. 1993)
- Partner: Chutimon Yensai
- Children: 3
- Parent(s): Victor Chugg, Lorna (née Hancock) Chugg
- Website: chuggentertainment.com/www.chuggmusic.com

Michael Glenn Chugg AM (born 15 June 1947) is an Australian entrepreneur, businessman and concert tour promoter. As a promoter and manager he was a founder of Frontier Touring Company (1979–99) and Michael Chugg Entertainment (2000–present). In June 1998, he was appointed a Member of the Order of Australia. In 2010, he co-authored his autobiography, Hey, You in the Black T-Shirt: The Real Story of Touring the World's Biggest Acts, with journalist Iain Shedden. At the ARIA Music Awards of 2019 Chugg received the ARIA Industry Icon Award.

== Early life and education ==
Michael Glenn Chugg was born on 15 June 1947 in Launceston to Victor and Lorna (née Hancock) Chugg, the eldest of four children. His grandmother, Ella Chugg, was his "best friend". He credits his great-grandfather with his idiosyncratic use of profanity "the first thing he did was taught me to swear. And it's always been a major part of my delivery of things".

He attended Glen Dhu Primary School in South Launceston and then Queechy High School in Norwood.

== Career ==
=== 1964–1979: Launceston to Melbourne ===
Chugg's career as a promoter began on 16 March 1964, when at 16 he organised a dance at the Trades Hall in Launceston for the local cycling club. About 300 people turned up for a profit of £80. He was an amateur cyclist, he volunteered to be a track announcer and then became a sports broadcaster for horse races, trotting, greyhounds and football.

His career as a Tasmanian radio announcer ended after he called a live Melbourne greyhound race: the lead dog was ahead by five lengths as he commentated, "Well, I'll be fucked, it's fallen over". Chugg started "running dances all over Tasmania ... I was just a working class kid". He became the band manager of local artists, The Chevrons, and arranged performances of visiting mainland acts, including Bobby and Laurie and The Easybeats.

Chugg moved to Melbourne in 1967 where he worked for the Australian Musicians Booking Organisation (AMBO), run by Gary Spry, Jeff Joseph and Darryl Sambell. At AMBO he met a 16-yr old, Michael Gudinski, whom Chugg described as "this young guy there with red hair and a big nose who was booking all these new bands", they became friends, business associates and sometime rivals. In the late 1960s Gudinski, together with Michael Browning, set up the Consolidated Rock Agency, Chugg started working for them.

In 1970, Chugg married Liselotte 'Lilo' Reisner, later that year Consolidated Rock opened a Sydney office and Chugg moved there to run it with Phil Walker. In June 1971 Consolidated Rock organised a concert at the Sydney Town Hall featuring Billy Thorpe & the Aztecs and Daddy Cool. Whilst well attended the organisers were criticised by attendees and, in particular, a music newspaper, Go-Set. As a result, Consolidated Rock launched a rival magazine, The Daily Planet, however its high running costs resulted in the closure of the magazine and Consolidated Rock.

Chugg and fellow agent Roger Davies then opened a new agency, Sunrise, in Sydney in late 1971. Their clients included Sherbet. It became a national company when it joined with Phillip Jacobsen's Melbourne-based, Let It Be agency, which handled Daddy Cool and Spectrum. When Davies left in 1975, to continue his career in the United States, Chugg was invited to join Gudinski's Premier Artists agency. At the same time, Chugg was managing acts and working as a freelance tour coordinator with Paul Dainty Corporation. He also spent time overseas, including the United Kingdom, managing Richard Clapton, and Kevin Borich.

In 1978 or 79, [Borich] took me to the Lyceum in London to see a new band – The Police. I was blown away, and back in Australia, I suggested we tour all these new U.K. acts that Dainty didn't want to know. At the same time, Gudinski came back from the U.K. He had signed the publishing of 90 percent of the punk explosion and we decided to start a touring company. We borrowed Ian Copeland's name, Frontier, and The Frontier Touring Company was born. Our first two tours were Ian's flagship acts – Squeeze and The Police.

— Michael Chugg

=== 1979–1999: Frontier Touring Company ===
Frontier Touring Company was founded in 1979 by nine people: Chugg, Gudinski, Jacobsen, Ray Evans, Sam Righi, Frank Stivala, Glenn Wheatley, Steve White and Robbie Williams. Wheatley and White left the company shortly after to concentrate on promoting their clients, Little River Band, in the US, with the remaining partners buying out their shares. In October 1980 Chugg and Gudinski were involved in an attempt to revive a national Battle of the Sounds competition, which had last run in 1972. The 1980 winner, Little Heroes, was one of three bands representing Victoria with three others from New South Wales, and three more from Queensland – other states were not represented.

Whilst arranging and promoting national tours for Squeeze, The Police, The Cure and Gary Numan, Chugg also took on the management of Jimmy and the Boys, The Church and The Sunnyboys. In January 1983 Chugg, with other concert promoters, staged the first Narara Music Festival, which was attended by over 30,000 people and grossed over $1.5 million.

In 1999, Chugg left Frontier Touring Company after 20 years with the organisation, and founded Michael Chugg Entertainment (MCE) the following year. He later recalled:

I think the last couple of years, the company was losing focus on what was going on. I felt we weren't keeping up with technology. Also, I felt we weren't doing enough with young acts and building a client base like we had done back in the early '80s with acts like The Police, Bon Jovi, Bob Dylan, Bryan Adams, and we weren't really getting on top of the new breed of acts. I was getting frustrated with that and thought I'd like to give it a try on my own.

— Michael Chugg

=== 2000–present: Chugg Entertainment and Chugg Music ===
In 2000, Chugg was co-producer of the opening and closing ceremonies of the Paralympic Games in Sydney and he was awarded 'International Promoter of the Year' by Pollstar. Initially MCE had backing from the Packer family's Consolidated Press Entertainment (CPE), but according to Stuart Coupe this was terminated because of CPE's unwillingness to back tours which Chugg was promoting, notably CPE's refusal to back Bob Dylan's 2001 tour, although Chugg and Dainty, then-CPE chairman, give differing accounts of their disagreements.

Long Way to the Top was an Australian Broadcasting Corporation (ABC) six-part TV documentary on the history of Australian rock and roll from 1956 to the modern era. "Episode 3: Billy Killed the Fish", was broadcast on 29 August 2001, and featured interviews with Chugg, Thorpe and Lobby Loyde. They described their Sunbury festival experiences and the development of pub rock in Australia. According to Chugg, an Aztec performance at Sydney's Bondi Lifesaver club in 1974 was so continuously loud as to kill a full tank of tropical fish in an upstairs area – hence the episode title.

During August 2002, promoters Chugg and Kevin Jacobsen, with Thorpe as co-producer, organised a related concert tour, Long Way to the Top, which featured many of the artists from the TV series. Performances at two Sydney concerts in September were recorded, broadcast on ABC-TV and subsequently released on DVD in December.

From late 2002 to early 2003, MCE promoted Australia and New Zealand tours by Santana and Red Hot Chili Peppers, both of which made substantial financial losses for the company.

In December 2004, Chugg together with Daryl Herbert and Glenn Wheatley purchased a 50% share of the company running the East Coast Blues & Roots Music Festival, an annual music festival held over the Easter long weekend at Byron Bay.

In 2006, Chugg Entertainment, in conjunction with Backrow Productions, expanded into musical theatre producing the musical, Priscilla, Queen of the Desert, which debuted at the Lyric Theatre, Sydney in October that year. That year also saw Chugg Entertainment partner with the organisers of the Laneway Festival expanding the event to Sydney. The Laneway Festival has subsequently expanded to include events in Brisbane (2007), Adelaide (2008), Perth (2009), Auckland (2010), Singapore (2011) and Detroit (2013).

In September 2012, Chugg Entertainment entered into a partnership with the promoters of the Homebake musical festival, held at the Domain every December. The 2013 event however was cancelled following poor ticket sales after the festival was forced to relocate to the steps of the Sydney Opera House.

In 2012, he launched Chugg Music, his own record label, signing Australian bands, The Griswolds, Deep Sea Arcade, Sheppard, Major Leagues, Casey Barnes, Lime Cordiale and New Zealand outfit Avalanche City. On 25 February 2014 Chugg expanded the label into the US.

== Philanthropy and other activities ==
As of 2002, Michael Chugg had raised more than $20 million (AUS) for various charities.

Chugg was a co-organiser of WaveAid, held on 29 January 2005, to support victims of the 2004 Boxing Day tsunami. John Watson of Eleven Music recalled "Mark Pope, convinced us that we needed [Chugg's] help ... we were all very hesitant because Michael was really from a different generation and, let's face it, he had a reputation. Within hours [he] had sorted the SCG as the venue by means that do not bear repeating here and we all realised we'd completely underestimated him. It would never have happened without [him]. He'd be the first to admit he's no saint but the amount he's done for charity over the years is truly staggering".

In November 2005, Chugg was the patron of Amplified, a presentation for industry leaders and fans of Tasmanian musicians.

Live Earth's Sydney concert on 7 July 2007 was promoted by MCE, with Chugg also a presenter – it was billed as a "climate change awareness" concert.

In 2009, Chugg and Gudinski, were the co-organizers of Sound Relief, a multi-venue rock music concert held simultaneously in Melbourne and Sydney to raise funds for those affected by the February 2009 Victorian bushfires. The event raised over $8 million (AUS) for Red Cross Victorian Bushfire Appeal and The Premier's Disaster Relief Fund Appeal in Queensland.

In August 2023, Gordi was appointed as one of eight members of the newly-formed Music Australia Council, a division of Creative Australia (formerly Australia Council for the Arts).

== Personal life ==
In 1970, Chugg married Liselotte "Lilo" Reisner, from a German immigrant family. Chugg's first child was born in 1977. Chugg and Liselotte divorced in 1983.

In 1987, he married Lisa Slattery and in 1988 his daughter was born. His second son was born in 1991. In 1993 Michael divorced Lisa. In 2002 while visiting the US, Chugg had a heart attack.

As of March 2008, his partner was Chutimon Yensai, whom he met in Thailand. Chugg was a chain-smoker and was noted for uttering profanities in on-stage rants, including yelling at incoming patrons with "hey, you in the black t-shirt, stop fucking running!" In 2010 he co-authored his autobiography, Hey, You in the Black T-Shirt: The Real Story of Touring the World's Biggest Acts, with journalist, Iain Shedden.

In March 2014, on the 50th anniversary of his start as a promoter, Denis Handlin (CEO of Sony Music Australia) opined "Chuggy is noisy, wild, cantankerous, the oldest teenager I know and very often a nightmare to deal with. But somehow we all love him because he lives and sweats the business with 100 per cent persistence and passion".

== Awards and honours ==
In 1993, Michael Chugg was named Australia's 'Father of the Year'. He received the award on the same day that he filed for divorce from his second wife.

He was voted International Promoter of the Year by Performance Magazine readers (1997), and by Pollstar (2000, 2009, and 2010).

On 8 June 1998, he was appointed a Member of the Order of Australia with a citation "for service to music and the performing arts, particularly in relation to the promotion of Australian artists and to fundraising for youth and children's charities". In 2005 he received the 'Ted Albert Award for Outstanding Services to Australian Music' at the APRA Awards.

At the 2007, Country Music Association Awards Chugg was announced as was the winner of the 'Jo Walker Meador International Award' – recognising outstanding achievement by an individual in advocating and supporting Country Music's marketing development in territories outside the US.

In 2008, he received an Arthur Award for 'Outstanding Contribution to Live Music' at the 20th International Live Music Conference.

In 2011, he received "The Immortal" award (a lifetime achievement award for outstanding contributions to popular culture) at the 2nd Annual Rolling Stone Awards in Sydney. In 2013 he was nominated for the Ernst & Young Entrepreneur of the Year 2013.

At the ARIA Music Awards of 2019 Chugg received the ARIA Industry Icon Award.

Year	Award	Category	About	Result
1998	Queen's Birthday Honours	Member of the Order of Australia	Michael Chugg	awarded
2005	APRA Awards (Australia)	Ted Albert Award for Outstanding Services to Australian Music	Michael Chugg	awarded
2007	Country Music Association Awards	Jo Walker Meador International Award	Michael Chugg	awarded
2008	International Live Music Conference	Arthur Award	Michael Chugg	awarded
2011	Rolling Stone Australia Awards	The Immortal Award (a lifetime achievement award for outstanding contributions to popular culture)	Michael Chugg	awarded
2013	Ernst & Young	Ernst & Young Southern Region Entrepreneur of the Year	Michael Chugg	Nominated
2019	ARIA Music Awards	Icon Awards	Michael Chugg	awarded

== Bibliography ==
- Chugg, Michael; Shedden, Iain (2010). Hey, You in the Black T-Shirt: The Real Story of Touring the World's Biggest Acts. Sydney, NSW: Pan Macmillan. ISBN 978-1-4050-4022-8.
