= Egoism (band) =

Australian musical group

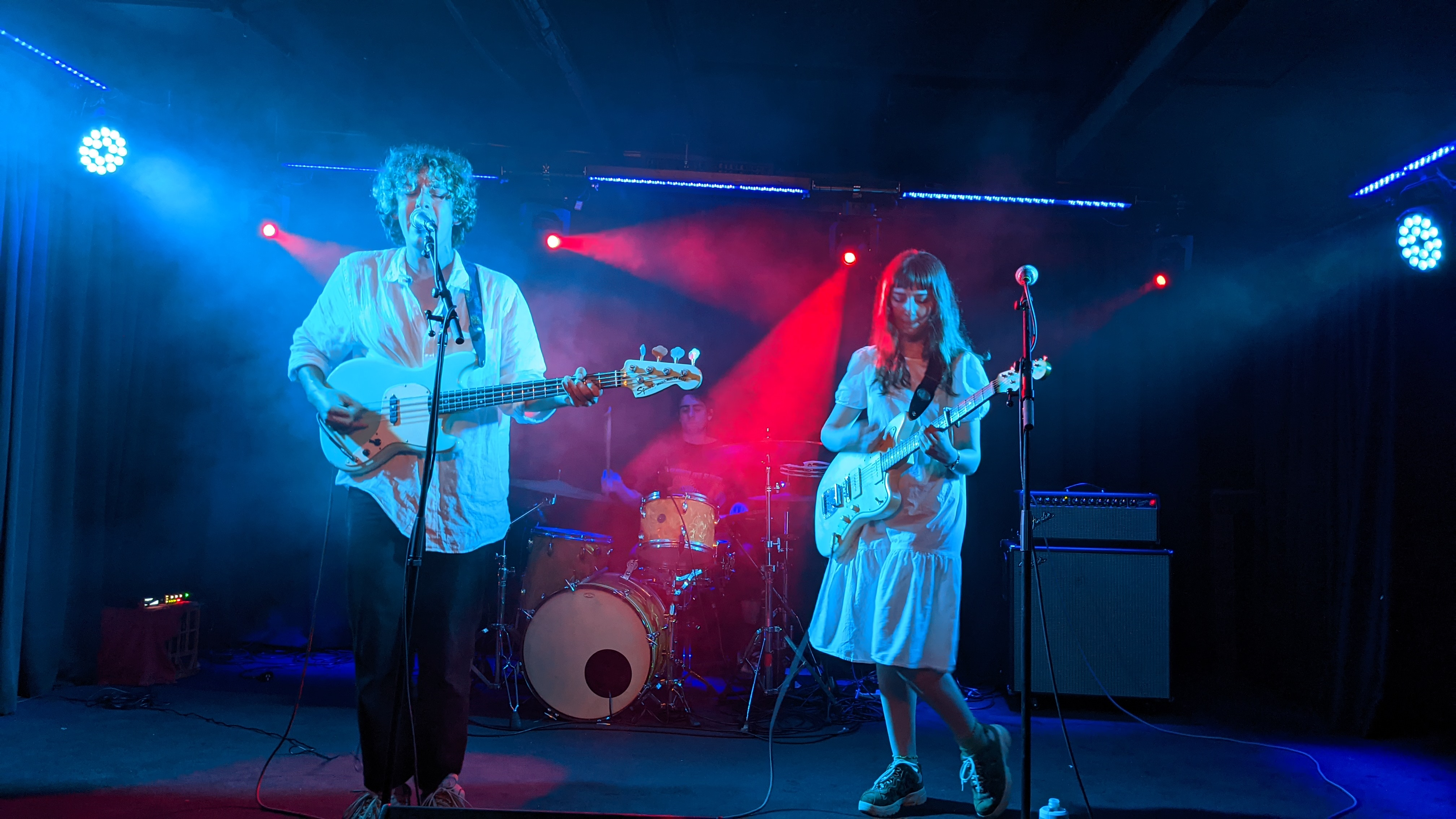
- Egoism performing live at Mary's Underground in Sydney, February 2021

Background information
- Origin: Sydney, Australia
- Genres: Dream pop, indie rock, shoegaze (early)
- Years active: 2015–present
- Members: Scout Eastment; Olive Rush; Adam Holmes
- Past members: Lauren McAuliffe; Dylan Scott; Pat McCarthy; Lucy Howroyd

Egoism (typeset as EGOISM) is an Australian pop band from Sydney, New South Wales. The band was formed in 2015, and currently consists of co-lead vocalists Scout Eastment (bass) and Olive Rush (guitar) with drummer Adam Holmes.

The band released their debut album, And Go Nowhere, in May 2025, which peaked at #9 on the Australian Artist Album Chart upon release. The band has also released three EPs − 2017's It's Wearing Off, 2020's On Our Minds and 2025's (Trust Me) − as well as several stand-alone singles.

== History ==
Before the formation of Egoism, Rush and Eastment were close friends. In 2015, Eastment and Rush began writing and playing music together. The band initially formed as a four-piece under the name Ego, releasing three singles: "Moon", "Better" and "Crowd". They supported bands such as Last Dinosaurs, Flyying Colours and Phantastic Ferniture in 2016. 2016 also saw the band officially change their name to Egoism and release their first single under the new name, "Reason".

Their debut EP was a three-track release entitled It's Wearing Off. The group have largely disowned the EP in recent years, and it has subsequently been removed from streaming services. In an interview with Pilerats, Eastment explained the band's complicated relationship with the release:

I think when you're doing something as a young person, a lot of people try to help with the best intentions and be like "oh, don't do it like that, do it like this," and you don't really know how to avoid that. A lot of those decisions got pushed into that EP and when I listen to it now, all I can hear are those mistakes."

After the departure of two band members, Egoism were turned into a duo. Their first single as a two-piece, "Sorry", was released in September 2018. This was followed with two new singles in 2019: "Enemies" in March, and "What Are We Doing?" in August.

The band undertook a national tour with Pinkish Blu in early 2020, coinciding with the release of a new single entitled "You You". In June 2020, the band were announced as one of 16 recipients of triple j Unearthed's Level Up Grants, created by the station to "support independent local artists who had been impacted by the COVID-19 pandemic". In September 2020, the band announced their second EP On Our Minds with the release of a new single, "Here's the Thing". They released a final single from the EP, "Happy", before its official release on 6 November 2020.

The band followed up on the EP with a single, "Lonely But Not Alone", in mid-2021. In 2022, the band released two new singles: "For Ages" and "2016–2018". The following year, longtime session/touring drummer Adam Holmes (also of Life's Ill) was inducted as a full-time member of the band.

In 2022, Egoism partook in two major support tour slots, supporting Upsahl at the Oxford Art Factory on 4 November 2022, as well as supporting Last Dinosaurs on their 2022 Australian tour across Melbourne, Sydney and Brisbane. The band followed up those shows with festival appearances at Lost Paradise 2022, Port Kembla Festival 2023 and Vivid Live 2023. Egoism also curated and headlined a mini-festival, titled "Cough It Up", on 22 December 2023, at Marrickville Bowling and Recreation Club, for Cystic Fibrosis Community Care, in support of their drummer Adam Holmes, who lives with Cystic Fibrosis. In 2024, the band supported The Rions on their Happiness In Places tour for shows Wollongong, Dee Why and Sydney. They then supported Teenage Dads on their 2025 Majorfomo tour in March 2025, simultaneously undertaking their own headlining tour dubbed the 2008 Honda Civic Tour.

Following the release of their debut album And Go Nowhere on 30 May 2025, the band went on tour across Adelaide, Sydney, Brisbane and Melbourne. The band also supported Half Alive on the Australian leg of their Persona world tour in June 2025. Egoism played their first overseas shows in September 2025, playing shows in South East Asia. In October 2025, the band shared a four-track acoustic EP entitled (Trust Me), which presented four stripped-back renditions of songs from And Go Nowhere.

== Discography ==
=== Studio albums ===
List of albums, with release date and label shown
Title	Details	Peak chart positions
Title	Details	AUS
And Go Nowhere	Released: 30 May 2025; Label: Egoism (IMP145CD)	— (Note: And Go Nowhere did not enter the ARIA Top 100 Chart, but peaked at number 9 on the Australian Artists Album Chart.)

=== EPs ===
List of EPs, with selected details
Title	Details
It's Wearing Off	Released: 2017; Label: Egoism
On Our Minds	Released: November 2020; Label: Egoism
(Trust Me)	Released: October 2025; Label: Egoism
