= Majordomo (album) =

Studio album by Teenage Dads
- Released: 23 August 2024
- Studio: El Rancho, Byron Bay
- Genre: Indie pop
- Length: 40:59
- Label: Chugg
- Producer: Chris Collins

Teenage Dads chronology
Midnight Driving (2023)	Majordomo (2024)	My Memento (2025)

Singles from Majordomo
- 1. "Speedracer" Released: 1 June 2023; 2. "I Like It" Released: 30 August 2023; 3. "Tale of a Man" Released: 29 November 2023; 4. "Weaponz" Released: 28 March 2024; 5. "Boyfriend" Released: 10 July 2024; 6. "Boarding Pass" Released: 23 August 2024

Majordomo is the second studio album by Australian indie pop band Teenage Dads, released on 23 August 2024 via Chugg. It is a follow-up to their ARIA Award-winning 2023 EP Midnight Driving, and is currently preceded by five singles including "Speedracer" and "I Like It". The band embarked on an Australian tour from August to support the album.

== Composition ==
Upon the album's announcement, Teenage Dads wrote in a press release that, aligning with the definition of a majordomo– one who makes arrangements and takes control for another– the band wanted to "explore themes of control: how sometimes you might be the majordomo seizing the day, and others you are falling from the sky in a box, unable to do anything."

== Release and promotion ==
On 1 June 2023, Teenage Dads released the lead single "Speedracer", alongside the announcement of a 30-date tour across Australia. According to Rolling Stone Australia, the song contains a more composed array of "funky basslines and vibrant synths", in contrast to their singles from the year prior, like "Teddy". The album's second single, "I Like It", followed in August, featuring "catchy riffs and jangly guitars". In November, "Tale of a Man" was issued with a fairy tale-style music video. Two more singles, "Weaponz" and "Boyfriend", were released before the album's title, artwork and release date was announced on 10 July 2024. Supporting the album, Teenage Dads will embark on the Majordomo Australia and New Zealand tour from August.

== Reception ==
Professional ratings
Review scores
Source	Rating
The AU Review	4.5/5 stars
Rolling Stone Australia	3.5/5 stars

Pace Proctor from The AU Review said "Drawing from a potent mix of influences, creativity, and impeccable songcraft, Teenage Dads deliver an album that is as adventurous as it is polished. Their playful, exploratory spirit is evident in every track, proving that what came before was certainly no fluke."

== Track listing ==
All lyrics are written by Jordan Finlay.

Majordomo track listing
No.	Title	Length
1.	"Boarding Pass"	3:37
2.	"Time to Go"	3:23
3.	"Speedracer"	2:58
4.	"I Like It"	3:00
5.	"Spiders"	2:52
6.	"Moon"	3:21
7.	"Weaponz"	2:29
8.	"Live Until You Die"	3:31
9.	"Boyfriend"	3:57
10.	"The Commander"	2:53
11.	"Tale of a Man"	2:46
12.	"What It Feels Like"	2:30
13.	"A Day in the Life of a No Good Pirate"	4:29
Total length:		40:59

== Personnel ==
- Teenage Dads – writing (all tracks)
- Jordan Finlay – lyrics (all tracks), album artwork
- Chris Collins – producer, mixing; writing (tracks 3, 4, 7, 9–11)
- George Georgiadis – mastering

== Charts ==
=== Weekly charts ===
Weekly chart performance for Majordomo
Chart (2024)	Peak position
Australian Albums (ARIA)	2

=== Year-end charts ===
2024 year-end chart performance for Majordomo
Chart (2024)	Position
Australian Artist Albums (ARIA)	47
