= God Took His Time on You =

2021 single by Casey Barnes

Single by Casey Barnes

from the album Light It Up
- Released: 13 August 2021
- Length: 3:36
- Label: Chugg Music
- Songwriter(s): Casey Barnes, Kaci Brown, Samuel Gray
- Producer(s): MSquared

Casey Barnes singles chronology
"Come Turn Me On" (2021)	"God Took His Time on You" (2021)	"Gone Gone Gone" (2021)

"God Took His Time on You" is a song by Australian country singer Casey Barnes. It was released on 13 August 2021 as the second single from Barnes' seventh studio album, Light It Up. It was certified gold in December 2023.

== Awards ==
At the AIR Awards of 2022, the song was nominated for Independent Song of the Year.

At the Queensland Music Awards of 2022, the song won Country Song of the Year.

At the APRA Music Awards of 2023, the song won Most Performed Country Work.

== Critical reception ==
Tyler Jenke from Rolling Stone Australia said "'God Took His Time on You' has all the hallmarks of a classic country ballad, complete with masterful production, introspective lyrics, and the sort of chorus that feels destined to wash over live crowds before too long."

== Certifications ==
Certifications for "God Took His Time on You"
Region	Certification	Certified units/sales
Australia (ARIA)	Gold	35,000^{‡}
^{‡} Sales+streaming figures based on certification alone.
