= My Memento =

2025 EP by Teenage Dads

EP by Teenage Dads
- Released: 22 August 2025
- Length: 13:40
- Label: Chugg
- Producers: Chris Collins; Teenage Dads

Teenage Dads chronology
Majordomo (2024)	My Memento (2025)

Singles from My Memento
- 1. "Stay Between Us" Released: 8 August 2025

My Memento is the fifth extended play by Australian indie rock group Teenage Dads, announced on 8 August 2025, alongside its lead single. It is scheduled for release on 22 August 2025 through Chugg.

The group told Rolling Stone Australia, the EP "serves as an extension" to their 2024 album Majordomo, while via a press release, they said, "While 3/4 songs were 'hidden' on Majordomo they all come from the same time and carry great memories. So, to us the EP feels like a 'souvenir of our album'. We intended to keep the songs hidden on the vinyl but that changed when we saw our fans enjoying them."

The group will tour Europe in September 2025 to support the release.

== Singles ==
"Stay Between Us" was released on 8 August 2025. Sarah Space from Melodic Mag said "The track is noticeably more mellow and subdued than the majority of their discography, which surprised many listeners, myself included. However, this new avenue proved to be delightful." Space also said "Lyrically, the track is a delightful love song, emphasising that love doesn't need to be extravagant to be genuine and meaningful."

== Track listing ==
All tracks are written by Angus Christie, Jordan Finlay, Vincent Kinna, and Connor McLaughlin.

My Memento track listing
No.	Title	Length
1.	"Stay Between Us"	3:28
2.	"Fire Fire"	3:21
3.	"Tidal Wave"	3:20
4.	"Little Bird"	3:29
Total length:		13:40

== Personnel ==
Credits adapted from Tidal.

=== Teenage Dads ===
- Angus Christie – bass (all tracks); production, mixing, engineering (track 1)
- Jordan Finlay – vocals, keyboards (all tracks); production, mixing, engineering (1)
- Vincent Kinna – drums (all tracks); production, mixing, engineering (1)
- Connor McLaughlin – guitar (all tracks); production, mixing, engineering (1)

=== Additional contributors ===
- George Georgiadis – mastering
- Chris Collins – production, mixing, engineering (2–4)
