= Midnight Driving =

2023 EP by Teenage Dads

EP by Teenage Dads
- Released: 3 March 2023
- Length: 21:17
- Label: Chugg

Teenage Dads chronology
Club Echo (2021)	Midnight Driving (2023)	Majordomo (2024)

Singles from Midnight Driving
- 1. "Exit Sign" Released: 1 April 2022; 2. "Teddy" Released: 29 July 2022; 3. "Hey, Diego!" Released: 10 November 2022; 4. "Midnight Driving" Released: 24 February 2023

Midnight Driving is the fourth extended play by Australian indie rock group Teenage Dads, released on 3 March 2023 through Chugg. It peaked at number 28 on the ARIA Charts, and won the Michael Gudinski Breakthrough Artist Award for the band at the ARIA Awards of 2023.

About the release, the group said: "The EP is about perspective, how things look from one point of view, and how they can change over time from another outlook. The songs feel like diary entries, documented internally, like conversations you have with yourself when you go Midnight Driving. A constant, internal form of therapy almost."

The album was nominated for Best Record at the Rolling Stone Australia Awards.

== Reception ==
Conor Lochrie from Rolling Stone Australia wrote that "With driving guitar lines, maturing lyrics, and infectious hooks made for summer cruises, the five-track collection should cement Teenage Dads' growing popularity in Australia."

Ellie Robinson from NME remarked that "On Midnight Driving they balance melodies with smokiness and wit. Nowhere is that clearer than the EP's middle third, where the buoyant and anthemic 'Teddy' is contrasted by the soaring and silky '3am'."

Mark Griffin from Future Mag Music said "Midnight Driving is as fun and energetic as anything Teenage Dads have put out to date, but also has surprising depth. It feels like it may well come to be seen as an inflection point." Also saying "Midnight Driving has the relaxed confidence of band that has found their stride and is enjoying the ride."

== Track listing ==
All lyrics are written by Jordan Finlay; all music is composed by Finlay, except where noted

Midnight Driving track listing
No.	Title	Length
1.	"Midnight Driving"	3:43
2.	"Hey, Diego!" (Finlay, Vincent Kinna, Angus Christie, Connor McLaughlin)	3:14
3.	"Teddy"	2:59
4.	"3am"	3:45
5.	"Exit Sign" (Finlay, Kinna, Christie, McLaughlin)	3:31
6.	"Goodbye, Goodbye Again"	4:01
Total length:		21:17

== Charts ==
Chart performance for Midnight Driving
Chart (2023)	Peak position
Australian Albums (ARIA)	28
