= Made for This =

Studio album by Casey Barnes
- Released: 7 August 2026
- Genre: Country
- Length: 32:52
- Label: Community
- Producers: MSquared; Liam Quinn; Andy Skibb; Mitch Thompson

Casey Barnes chronology
Mayday (2024)	Made for This (2026)

Made for This is the tenth studio album by the Australian country singer Casey Barnes, released on 7 August 2026 via Community Music. The album was preceded by the singles "Buy That Girl a Beer", "Rough Around the Edges", "Made for This" and "Time to Burn".

== Background and release ==
In May 2025, Barnes released the standalone single "Buy That Girl a Beer", marking his first new music since 2024's Mayday.

His second release of the year, "Rough Around the Edges", was described by Megan Hopkins of Countrytown as signalling "a new sonic chapter for Barnes", along with "Buy That Girl a Beer", with the releases reflecting "a deliberate lean into punchier, anthemic storytelling".

In September 2025, Barnes and Chugg Music announced the amicable conclusion of their six-year partnership, marking the beginning of a new independent era for the musician. Barnes stated: "The time feels right for a fresh start, and I'm excited to see what new opportunities lie ahead as we continue to build on the amazing momentum both here in Australia and internationally. I can't wait to share the next chapter of this journey."

In February 2026, Barnes released "Made for This", the third single and title track from his ninth studio album of the same name. The country rock track was described by Megan Hopkins of Countrytown as "a gritty, defiant anthem about resilience and self-belief". The song was also selected as the theme song for Nine Network's coverage of the 2026 National Rugby League season, airing at the opening of each televised match.

The album was announced on 18 May 2026, shortly following the release of Barnes' collaboration "Time to Burn" with Pete Murray.

== Track listing ==
Made for This track listing
No.	Title	Writer(s)	Producer(s)	Length
1.	"Made for This"	Casey Barnes; Michael DeLorenzis; Michael Paynter; Andy Skibb; Jimmy Thow	MSquared	2:53
2.	"She Does"	Barnes; Jordan Dozzi; Kyle Sturrock	Skibb	3:25
3.	"Time to Burn" (with Pete Murray)	Barnes; DeLorenzis; Pete Murray; Paynter	MSquared	3:09
4.	"Rough Around the Edges"	Barnes; DeLorenzis; Dozzi; Paynter	MSquared	3:01
5.	"Still in the Fight"	Barnes; DeLorenzis; Mark Duckworth; Paynter	MSquared	3:46
6.	"Tiptoe"	Barnes; DeLorenzis; Paynter	MSquared	3:23
7.	"The Woman That You Are"	Barnes; Hayley Warner	Mitch Thompson	3:22
8.	"Round Here"	Barnes; DeLorenzis; Paynter	MSquared	3:21
9.	"Buy That Girl a Beer"	Barnes; Skibb; Thow	Skibb	3:08
10.	"A Different Song"	Barnes; Danielle Blakey; Morgan Evans	MSquared; Liam Quinn	3:24
Total length:				32:52

== Personnel ==
Credits are adapted from Tidal.

- Casey Barnes – vocals (all tracks), background vocals (track 1)
- Liam Quinn – mastering (1–3, 5–8)
- Michael Paynter – mixing (1, 2, 7); background vocals, bass, guitar, keyboard (1)
- Michael DeLorenzis – mixing (1, 2, 7); bass, drums, guitar (1)
- Pete Murray – vocals (3)

== Charts ==
Chart performance for Made for This
Chart (2026)	Peak position
Australian Albums (ARIA)	6
Australian Country Albums (ARIA)	1
