= Building the Band =

Netflix reality television series

- Promotional poster
- Presented by: AJ McLean
- Judges: Nicole Scherzinger; Liam Payne; Kelly Rowland
- Country of origin: United States
- Original language: English
- No. of seasons: 1
- No. of episodes: 10

Production
- Executive producers: Simon Crossley; Clara Elliot; Alison Holloway; Cat Lawson; Katrina Morrison
- Running time: 53–54 minutes
- Production company: Remarkable Entertainment

Original release
- Network: Netflix
- Release: July 9 – July 23, 2025

Building the Band is an American reality television singing competition that aired on Netflix in July 2025. The program format sees 44 artists form six groups through a selection process, which leads to eliminations until one group is selected as the winner and earning a $500,000 prize. Many reviewers said that the best thing about the show was the posthumous appearances of Liam Payne. The series was won by 3Quency.

== Format ==
In the first round, all artists sang a solo performance to the rest of the contestants while in pods, unable to see one another. Each artist was able to send 10 "likes" to performers who they wanted to see in a band alongside them. Artists who received fewer than five likes, or had only been liked by performers who had been eliminated or had formed a band without them, were eliminated. At the end of the round, six bands formed, each containing three to five members, who met for the first time during subsequent performances. These then competed in showcases, with each eliminating a band; last band standing won $500,000.

== History ==
Cat Lawson and Simon Crossley got the idea for Building the Band by the lack of bands on the Billboard Hot 100. Netflix announced Building the Band in May 2024 and that Banijay UK subdivision Remarkable Entertainment would produce it; executive production was handed by Lawson, Crossley, Alison Holloway, Clara Elliot, and Katrina Morrison. The show's host and judges, AJ McLean, Liam Payne, Kelly Rowland, and Nicole Scherzinger, were announced in August; the four had previously been members of the Backstreet Boys, One Direction, Destiny's Child, and the Pussycat Dolls.

Production took place during summer 2024, with the final performances taped in August. Payne died in October 2024; the show marked his final public appearance and was topped and tailed with tributes to him. His appearances, which a Netflix press release said were released with permission from his family, included him dispensing advice to bands and comparing their formation with that of One Direction. Episodes were broadcast in batches between July 9 and July 23, 2025; the latter date also marked his band's 15th anniversary. The fourth and seventh episodes ended with five out of six bands formed and with three out of five bands through to the third showcase respectively.

Shortly before the final, the show's 3Quency, SZN4, Soulidified, and Midnight 'Til Morning performed at Netflix Summer Break, a promotional vehicle for participants of other Netflix shows. The series was won by 3Quency, who performed Chloe's "Have Mercy" and Mariah Carey's "Always Be My Baby" in the final. The runners-up were SZN4, who performed Rag'n'Bone Man's "Human" and The Weeknd's "Blinding Lights" in the final, and Soulidified, who came third after performing NSYNC's "Bye Bye Bye".

Multiple reviewers said that Payne was the best thing about the show, although The i Paper questioned the show's existence given his death and The Daily Telegraph described it as an "insincere" blend of The X Factor, The Circle, and Love Is Blind. More positive reviews came from The Guardian and The Standard. The show's cancellation was announced in June 2026, by which time 3Quency, SZN4, Soulidified, and Midnight 'Til Morning had all released music and toured.

== Contestants ==
Fifty contestants were billed, although only 44 were broadcast. 3Quency's members included Brianna Mazzola, who had voiced Velvet in Trolls Band Together and appeared on Club Mickey Mouse, and Briana Gilyard, who left after the others opted to become a three-piece. Chance Perez, Karlee Tanaka, and Erica Padilla had previously been on Boy Band, Dream Academy, and Eurovision Song Contest feeder show Eurovision - Australia Decides respectively; the first had won his series as part of In Real Life and voiced Javi Garcia in Power Rangers Dino Fury and Power Rangers Cosmic Fury. Padilla had also been on Australian Idol. Other contestants included Zach Newbould, who had been on The Voice; Conor Smith, who had been on the Australian version; Elise Kristine, who had been on American Idol; and Malik Heard, who had been on The Voice and American Idol. Soulidified were known as ICONYX during the tenth episode.

Finalists
Band	Contestant	Age	Origin
3Quency	Brianna Mazzola	24	Philadelphia
3Quency	Nori Royale	24	Atlanta
3Quency	Wennely Quezada	25	Kansas City, Kansas
SZN4	Aaliyah Rose	22	Orem, Utah
SZN4	Cameron Goode	22	Blue Island, Illinois
SZN4	Donzell Taggart	25	Little Rock, Arkansas
SZN4	Katie Roeder	24	Malden, Massachusetts
ICONYX	Bradley Rittmann	23	Boston
ICONYX	Landon Boyce	21	Santa Clara, Utah
ICONYX	Malik Heard	28	Dallas
ICONYX	Shade Jenifer	27	Clinton, Maryland
Midnight 'Til Morning	Conor Smith	22	San Remo, New South Wales
Midnight 'Til Morning	Mason Watts	25	Toowoomba
Midnight 'Til Morning	Shane Appell	22	Putnam Valley, New York
Midnight 'Til Morning	Zach Newbould	21	Boston
Sweet Seduction	Alison Ogden	24	Grasonville, Maryland
Sweet Seduction	Elise Kristine	21	Issaquah, Washington
Sweet Seduction	Haley Gosserand	21	Kansas City, Missouri
Siren Society	Autumn Bryant	21	Bowie, Maryland
Siren Society	Erica Padilla	24	Melbourne
Siren Society	Jenna Davenport	19	Las Vegas
Siren Society	Noriella Gjieli	24	New York, New York

Other contestants
Contestant	Age	Origin
Alexandra Starr	29	Long Beach, New York
Briana Gilyard	23	Summit, New Jersey
Cece Keating	21	Brooklyn via Texas
Chance Perez	27	Seal Beach, California
Christian Kirk	28	Nashville, Tennessee
Eric Tyler	25	Orangeburg, South Carolina
Ethan Pugh	26	Marysville, Ohio
Gabriella Lora	25	New York, New York
Hannah Alexandra	23	Miami
Jenna Marquis	21	Simi Valley, California
Jermarcus Riggins	27	Fort Lauderdale, Florida
Joey McGrew	22	Waller, Texas
Karlee Tanaka	21	Honolulu
Kevin Chung	29	Atlanta
Mandy Rosebish	24	Mechanicsville, Virginia
Max Wright	21	Nevada City, California
Maya Patel	25	Crystal Lake, Illinois
Nico May	21	Milwaukee
Peter Carboni	30	Boston
Pillow Prince	26	Chicago
Thomas Berberian Gonzaga	21	Goiana
Vibi Borghesi	27	Ontario

== Episodes ==
No.	Title	Original release date
1	"The Pinky Promise"	July 9, 2025
2	"Locked In"	July 9, 2025
3	"The Magic Number"	July 9, 2025
4	"I Always Get What I Want"	July 9, 2025
5	"The First Look"	July 16, 2025
6	"Breaking the Band"	July 16, 2025
7	"The Showcase"	July 16, 2025
8	"The Big Stage"	July 23, 2025
9	"The Pressure is On"	July 23, 2025
10	"The Finals"	July 23, 2025
