= Soulidified =

American group

Background information
- Origin: Los Angeles, U.S.
- Genres: Pop; soul; R&B
- Years active: 2024–present
- Label: Atlantic
- Members: Shade Jenifer; Malik Heard; Bradley Rittmann; Landon Boyce
- Website: soulidifiedworld.com

Soulidified, briefly known as Iconyx, is an American boy band that formed on the Netflix series Building the Band. After forming throughout the process of the series, they placed third in the competition. Soulidified is composed of Shade Jenifer, Malik Heard, Bradley Rittmann, and Landon Boyce.

The group is managed by Johnny Wright, who previously managed boy bands New Kids on the Block, Backstreet Boys, and *NSYNC.

== History ==
=== 2024–2025: Building the Band ===
In 2024, Landon Boyce, Malik Heard, Shade Jenifer and Bradley Rittmann all individually auditioned for a place in a band on the Netflix competition series Building the Band. The series featured 50 contestants competing to become members of bands and involved contestants "liking" who they would like to connect with. By episode 3, the four had bonded and formed a band.

The group individually rehearsed for a performance of "Finesse" by Bruno Mars; their performance of the song marked the first time the members were meeting. After coming up with the name Soulidified, they progressed through the competition; they sang Usher's "U Remind Me" for their first performance after the booths, with their performances including Miguel's "Sure Thing", Tevin Campbell's "Can We Talk", SZA's "Saturn" and NSYNC's Bye Bye Bye. They reprised their "U Remind Me" performance for Netflix Summer Break, a promotional vehicle for participants of other Netflix shows broadcast seven episodes in. Other bands from Building the Band also performed.

Building the Band performances and results
Round	Song choice				Results
Round	Landon Boyce	Malik Heard	Shade Jenifer	Bradley Rittmann	Results
Auditions	"Toxic"	"Versace on the Floor"	"Let Me Love You"	"So Sick"	Safe
Performance 1	"Finesse"				Safe
Performance 2	"U Remind Me"				Safe
Performance 3	"Sure Thing"				Safe
Performance 4	"Can We Talk"				Safe
Semi-final	"Saturn"				Bottom two
Final (Note: Performed as ICONYX)	"Bye Bye Bye"				3rd place

=== 2025–present: One & Only and North American tour ===
On August 19, 2025, the band released their first single "One & Only" and a second song, "What's Your Name" in 2026.

The band's first tour in North America began with 3Quency on October 30, 2025, in Lake Buena Vista, FL and ended on November 28, 2025, in Las Vegas.

== Artistry ==
Soulidified have cited groups such as Boyz II Men, NSYNC, and the Backstreet Boys as their influences, as well as solo artists like Michael Jackson, Usher, Beyonce, and Adele.

== Discography ==
=== Promotional singles ===
List of promotional singles, showing year released
Title	Year	Album
"Sure Thing"	2025	Non-album promotional singles
"Can We Talk"	2025	Non-album promotional singles
"One & Only"	2025	Non-album promotional singles
"Mistletoe"	2025	Non-album promotional singles
"What's Your Name"	2026	Non-album promotional singles
"Man Ain't Me"	2026	
