= Midnight 'Til Morning =

American-Australian group

Midnight Til Morning
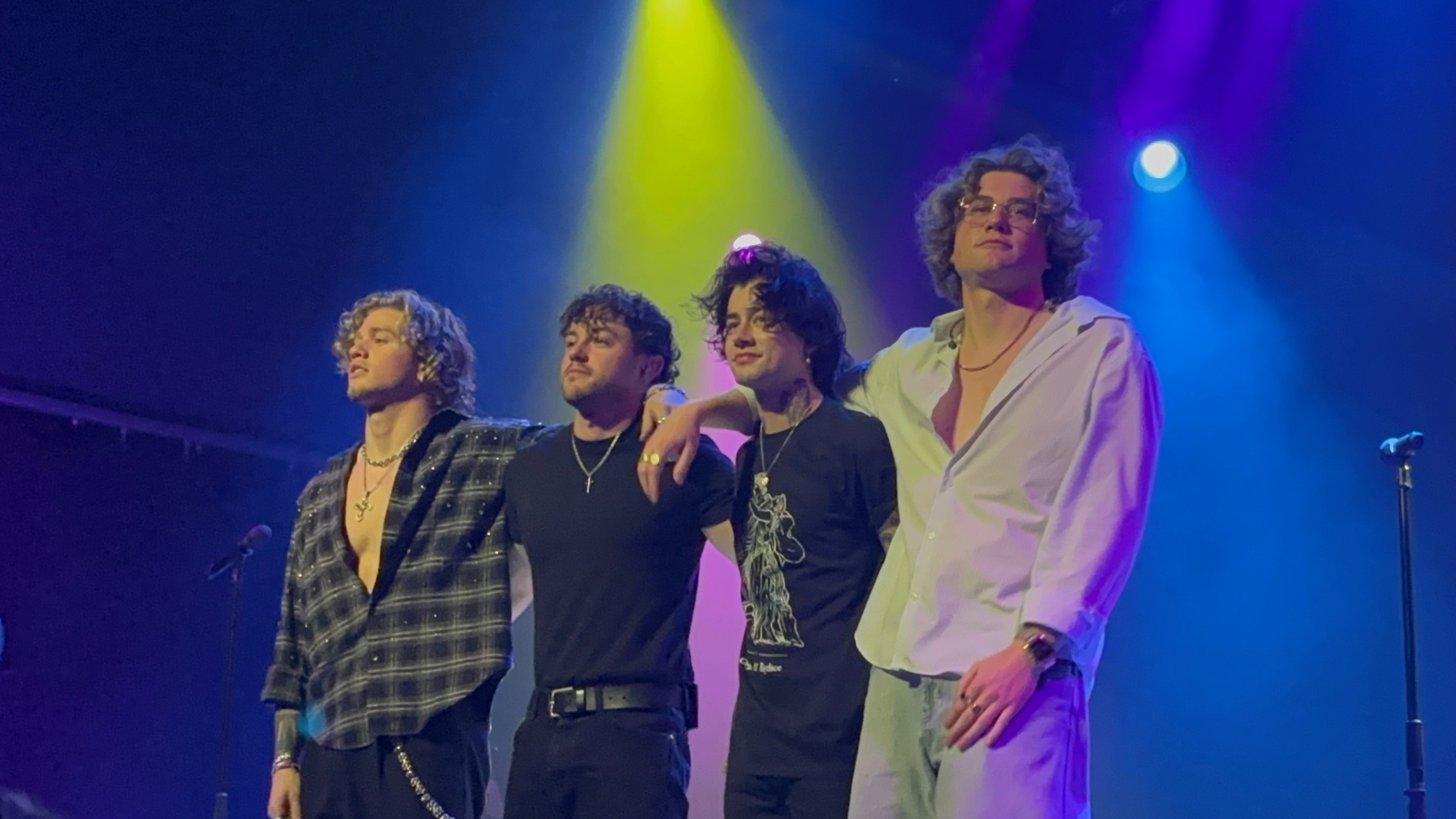
- Left to right: Shane Appell, Zach Newbould, Conor Smith, and Mason Watts

Background information
- Origin: Sydney, Australia
- Genres: Pop; pop rock
- Years active: 2024–present
- Label: Chugg Music
- Members: Shane Appell; Zach Newbould; Conor Smith; Mason Watts
- Website: midnighttilmorningofficial.com

Midnight Til Morning, often shortened to MTM, is an American–Australian pop rock boy band that formed on the Netflix series Building the Band. After forming themselves throughout the process of the series, they placed fourth in the competition. Midnight Til Morning are composed of Shane Appell, Zach Newbould, Conor Smith, and Mason Watts.

== History ==
=== 2024–2025: Building the Band ===
In 2024 Shane Appell, Zach Newbould, Conor Smith, and Mason Watts individually auditioned for a place in a band on the Netflix competition series Building the Band. The series featured 50 contestants competing to become members of bands and involved contestants "liking" artists with which they would like to connect. By episode 4, the four had bonded and formed a band.

The group individually rehearsed for a performance of "Higher Power" by Coldplay; their performance of the song marked the first time the members met. Coming up with the name Midnight Til Morning, they progressed through the competition. They sang Billie Eilish's "Ocean Eyes" for their first performance after the sound booth performances. During competition they also sang the Goo Goo Dolls' "Iris", Hoobastank's "The Reason", and Post Malone's "Circles". They reprised their "Ocean Eyes" performance for Netflix Summer Break, a promotional vehicle for participants of other Netflix shows which was broadcast after seven episodes. Other bands from Building the Band performed.

Building the Band performances and results
Round	Song choice				Results
Round	Shane Appell	Zach Newbould	Conor Smith	Mason Watts	Results
Auditions	"Lose Control"	"Beautiful Things"	"Drivers License"	"Breakeven"	Safe
Performance 1	"Higher Power"				Safe
Performance 2	"Ocean Eyes"				Safe
Performance 3	"Iris"				Bottom two
Performance 4	"The Reason"				Bottom two
Semi-final	"Circles"				Eliminated

=== 2025–present: Chugg Music, Afterglow and tour ===
After Building the Band, Midnight Til Morning signed with Chugg Music. On August 5, 2025, the band released their first single "Bye" and a second song, "Ghost of Us". On September 10, 2025, MTM released two more songs, "Navy Eyes" and "Welcome to LA". In October they released the single "Heart on Fire". Their EP, "Afterglow" was released on October 8, 2025, with an acoustic version, "Afterglow (Unplugged)" following on November 21, 2025.

The band's first tour in North America and Australia began on October 9 in Orlando, Florida and ended on November 23, 2025 in Melbourne, Australia. MTM embarked on a four-month world tour in January 2026, beginning in the UK and Europe, followed by Asia, Latin America, and a second USA tour.

A second UK and Europe tour, originally scheduled to May and June 2026, was postponed to October 2026. The 15 show tour started in Glasgow, Scotland on October 7 and ended in Frankfurt, Germany on November 1.

In the summer of 2026, Midnight Til Morning performed in two major music festivals: BST Hyde Park in London on June 28 and Summer Sonic Festival in Tokyo on August 15, 2026.

MTM released seven songs between August and November 2026.

== Discography ==
=== Extended plays ===
List of EPs, with selected details and chart positions
Title	EP details	Peak chart positions
Title	EP details	AUS
Afterglow	Released: October 8, 2025; Label: Chugg Music; Formats: CD, digital download, LP	16

=== Singles ===
List of singles, showing year released
Title	Year	Album
"Bye"	2025	Afterglow (EP)
"Navy Eyes"	2025	Afterglow (EP)
"Heart on Fire"	2025	Afterglow (EP)
"Math"	2026	Non-album single
"Easy"	2026	Non-album single
"Gracie"	2026	Non-album single
"Walk Away"	2026	Non-album single
"Anything"	2026	Non-album single
"Bittersweet"	2026	Non-album single
"365"	2026	Non-album single
"Lose Your Head"	2026	Non-album single

=== Promotional singles ===
List of promotional singles, showing year released
Title	Year	Album
"Ocean Eyes"	2025	Non-album promotional singles
"Ghost of Us"	2025	Afterglow
"Circles"	2025	Non-album promotional singles
