= Rosaneves =

Coordinates: 19°44′40″S 44°05′23″W

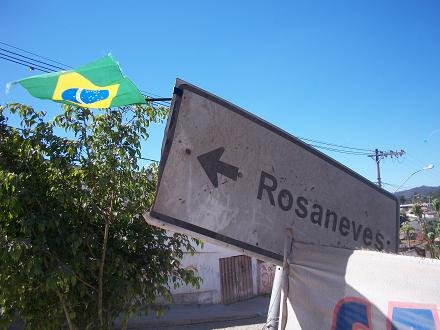
Rosaneves's Roadsign with Flag of Brazil.

Rosaneves is a neighbourhood of the Ribeirão das Neves town, metropolitan region of Belo Horizonte, Minas Gerais state, Brazil. Its streets were baptized with plant names, in Portuguese (with exception of Jardineiras Street): Acácias Street, Alfazema Street, Alva-Bonina Street, Anis Street, Antúrios Street, Arálias Street, Azaleia Street, Begônias Street, Buganville Street, Cabreúvas Street, Calêndulas Street, Camélias Street, Caneleiras Street, Capuchinhos Street, Carmesim Street, Cássia Imperial Street, Cravina Street, Cravos Street, Dálias Street, Dama da Noite Street, Flor-de-Lis Street, Flor de seda Street, Genciana Street, Hortências Street, Ipê Street, Jacarandás Street, Jasmim Street, Jatobá Street, Madressilva Avenue (the main street), Magnólias Street, Malva Street, Manacás Street, Mimo de Vênus Street, Oliveiras Street, Orquídeas Street, Palmeiras Street, Papoulas Street, Perpétuas Street, Petúnias Street, Primaveras Street, Tinhorões Street, Trombetas Street, Tulipas Street, Urze Street, Violetas Street and Vitória-Régia Street.
