= Siren Society =

Los Angeles-based girl group

- Origin: Los Angeles, U.S. Melbourne, Australia
- Genres: Pop; R&B; dance-pop
- Years active: 2024–2026
- Label: Today Is Vintage
- Past members: Jenna Dave; Noriella Gjielli; Erica Padilla; Autumn Stallia

Siren Society was an American-Australian girl group that formed on the Netflix series Building the Band in 2024. After forming themselves throughout the process of the series, they placed sixth in the competition. They were composed of Jenna Dave, Noriella Gjielli, Erica Padilla and Autumn Stallia. Following the series, they signed with Today Is Vintage and have released singles including "If It Was Me" and "Don't Cool Me Down". They announced their disbandment in 2026, wanting to focus on solo endeavours.

== History ==
In 2024, Jenna Dave, Noriella Gjielli, Erica Padilla and Autumn Stallia all individually auditioned for a place in a band on the Netflix competition series Building the Band. Padilla is from Australia and of Filipino descent, having competed in Eurovision – Australia Decides in 2022, as well as Australian Idol in 2023. She also worked as a restaurant singer and had amassed a following on TikTok from her singing videos. Dave originates from Nevada, Gjielli from New York and of Albanian descent and Stallia from Maryland. The series featured 50 contestants competing to become members of bands and involved contestants "liking" who they would like to connect with. The four girls connected with each other and agreed to form a four-piece girl group together, later named Siren Society.

The group individually rehearsed for a performance of "Want to Want Me" by Jason Derulo; their performance of the song marked the first time the members were meeting. They sang for their first performance after the booths "Love Yourself" by Justin Bieber. They also performed "Don't Cha" by the Pussycat Dolls, before being eliminated from the competition.

Building the Band performances and results
Round	Song choice			
Round	Jenna Dave	Noriella Gjielli	Erica Padilla	Autumn Stallia
Auditions	"Too Little Too Late"	"The Door"	"Motivation"	"Best Part"
Performance 1	"Want to Want Me"			
Performance 2	"Love Yourself"			
Performance 3	"Don't Cha"			

In August 2025, it was announced that Siren Society had signed with Today Is Vintage. That same month, they released their debut single, "If It Was Me". It was followed up by "Stand", their second single, weeks later. After its release, Siren Society announced their first set of shows, with stops in New York and Los Angeles. In November 2025, they released a self-titled extended play (EP).

== Discography ==
=== Extended plays ===
Title	Details
Siren Society	Released: November 7, 2025; Label: Independent; Format: Digital download, streaming

=== Singles ===
List of singles, showing year released
Title	Year	Album
"If It Was Me"	2025	Siren Society
"Stand"	2025	Siren Society
"Don't Cool Me Down"	2025	Siren Society

=== Promotional singles ===
List of promotional singles, showing year released
Title	Year	Album
"Love Yourself"	2025	Non-album promotional single
