= Ribeirão das Neves =

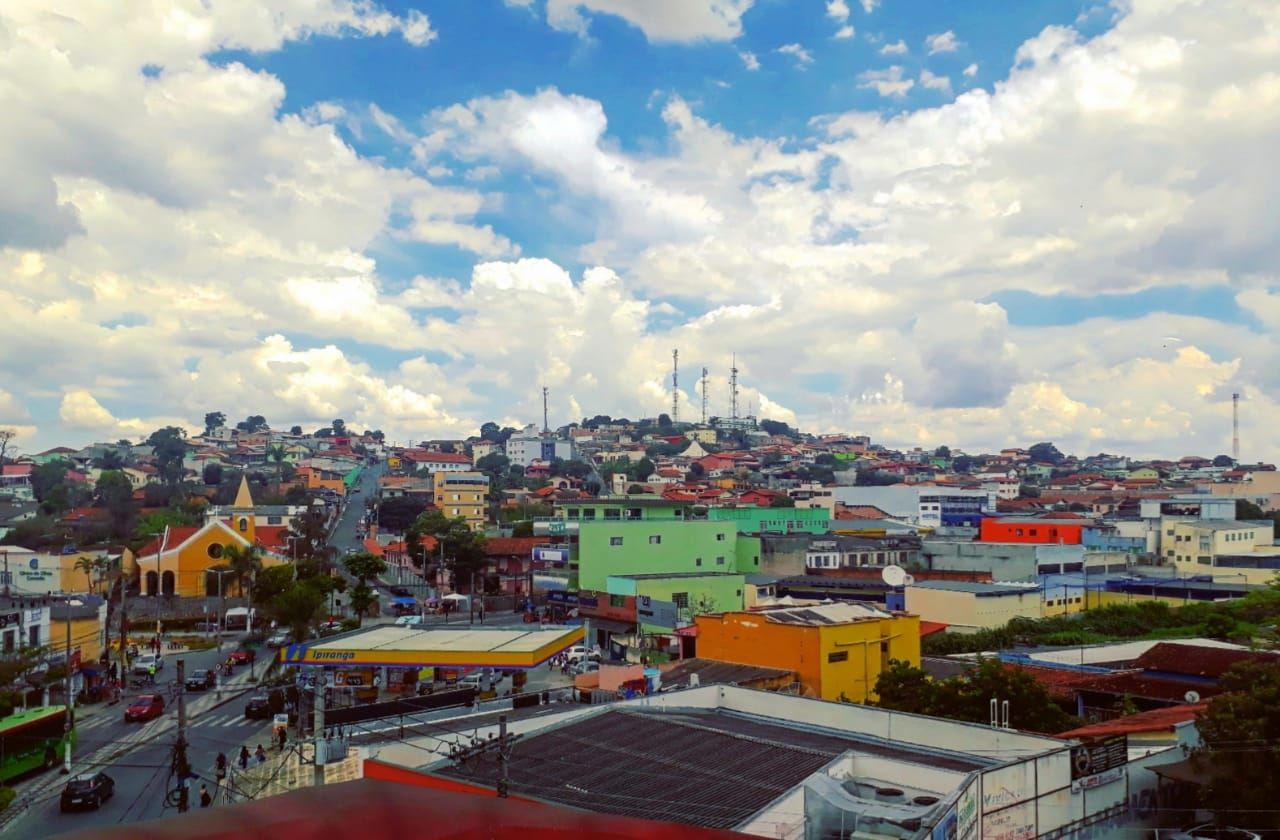
- Center of Ribeirão das Neves

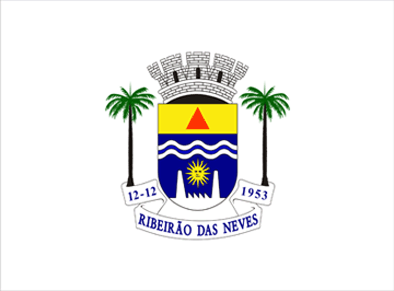
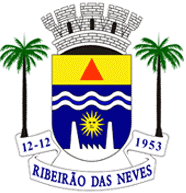
- Flag Coat of arms
- Nickname: Neves
- Location in the state of Minas Gerais and Brazil

- Location in Brazil
- Coordinates: 19°46′1″S 44°5′13″W
- Country: Brazil

Government

Area
  - Total: 155.454 km^{2} (60.021 sq mi)
  - Land: 155.454 km^{2} (60.021 sq mi)
- Elevation: 857 m (2,812 ft)

Population (2022 Brazilian census)
  - Total: 329,794
  - Estimate (2025): 346,971
  - Density: 2.195/km^{2} (5.69/sq mi)
- Time zone: UTC−3 (BRT)
- CEP postal code: 33805-000
- Website: ribeiraodasneves.mg.gov.br

Ribeirão das Neves (lit. Snowy Creek) is a Brazilian municipality located in the state of Minas Gerais. The city belongs to the mesoregion Metropolitana de Belo Horizonte and to the microregion of Belo Horizonte. Most residents commute to Belo Horizonte. The city's population in 2025 was 346,971.

== History ==
Previously called Matas de Bento Pires, its first documents date back to the 18th century, when it was called "Matas de Bento Pires". In 1745, Jacintho Vieira da Costa, then field master, obtained the rights to the lands of Matas de Bento Pires and built a chapel dedicated to Our Lady of the Snows. Due to this, Matas de Bento Pires became Fazenda das Neves and later Engenho das Neves, in 1946.

== Geography ==
Ribeirão das Neves is located on the northwest of Belo Horizonte. Federal Highway 135 passes through it. Its average elevation is 857 meters (2,812 ft) above sea level.

=== Climate ===
Ribeirão das Neves has a Tropical Savanna Climate (Aw). It receives the most precipitation in December, with 265.5 mm (10.45 in) of average rainfall; and the least precipitation in July, with 5 mm (0.20 in) of average rainfall.

Climate data for Ribeirão das Neves
Month	Jan	Feb	Mar	Apr	May	Jun	Jul	Aug	Sep	Oct	Nov	Dec	Year
Mean daily maximum °C (°F)	28 (82)	29 (84)	28 (82)	27 (81)	25 (77)	25 (77)	25 (77)	26 (79)	27 (81)	28 (82)	27 (81)	27 (81)	27 (80)
Daily mean °C (°F)	23 (73)	24 (75)	23 (73)	22 (72)	20 (68)	19 (66)	18 (64)	20 (68)	22 (72)	23 (73)	23 (73)	23 (73)	22 (71)
Mean daily minimum °C (°F)	19 (66)	20 (68)	19 (66)	18 (64)	15 (59)	13 (55)	13 (55)	14 (57)	16 (61)	18 (64)	19 (66)	19 (66)	17 (62)
Average rainfall mm (inches)	227.0 (8.94)	246.5 (9.70)	125.9 (4.96)	46.1 (1.81)	18.6 (0.73)	10.1 (0.40)	5.0 (0.20)	9.5 (0.37)	34.3 (1.35)	84.0 (3.31)	179.0 (7.05)	265.5 (10.45)	1,251.5 (49.27)
Average rainy days (≥ 1 mm)	18.7	13.0	13.9	6.4	3.2	1.6	0.9	1.6	5.2	10.7	17.3	21.1	113.6
Mean daily daylight hours	13.2	12.7	12.2	11.6	11.2	11.0	11.1	11.5	12.0	12.6	13.1	13.3	12.1
Source: Weatherspark.com

== Notable people ==
- Henfil (1944–1988), cartoonist
- Laura Sabino (born 1999), politician and YouTuber
- Wilson Piazza, footballer

== See also ==
- List of municipalities in Minas Gerais
- Rosaneves
