= Chavoso da USP =

Brazilian speaker and YouTuber

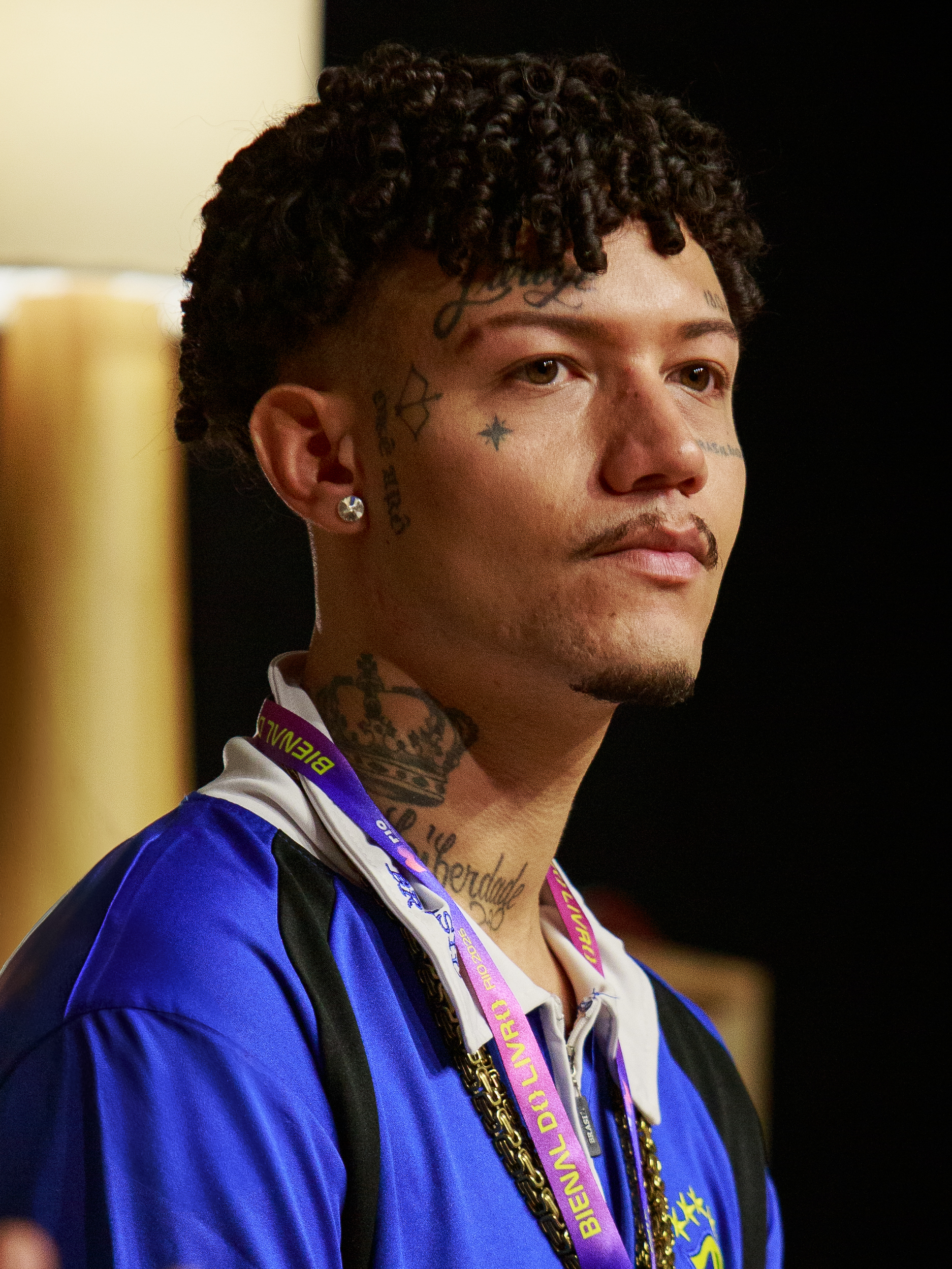
- Chavoso da USP in 2025
- Born: Thiago Torres Moura Santos; February 19, 2000 (age 26); São Paulo, Brazil
- Education: University of São Paulo
- Occupations: Internet personality; YouTuber; Lecturer

Thiago Torres Moura Santos (born in São Paulo on 19 February 2000), better known as Chavoso da USP (lit. 'Cool guy from USP'), is a professor, lecturer, and YouTuber. A graduate in Social Sciences from the University of São Paulo, he became popular through a Facebook post recounting his university experience. His content focuses primarily on educational, political, and social issues.

== Biography ==
Thiago was born in Jardim Vista Alegre and grew up in Jardim Elisa Maria, two favelas in Brasilândia, a district in the northern zone of São Paulo. He enrolled at the University of São Paulo in the Social Sciences course in 2018. A year after enrolling, he became popular with a Facebook post reporting what he claimed were racial and socioeconomic injustices present at the university. The post quickly went viral. It was then that he created his YouTube channel, Chavoso da USP.

Thiago is the son of migrants from the Northeast of Brazil; his mother is from Pernambuco and his father from Piauí.

In 2023, he joined the Boteco Comunista project, alongside other content creators such as Dimitra Vulcana and Laura Sabino, which focused on discussing contemporary and controversial topics from a Marxist and revolutionary perspective. The program was structured as a series of debates and interviews. Guests included influential figures from the Brazilian political scene, such as politicians Glauber Braga and Talíria Petrone, as well as the drag queen, artist, and educator Rita von Hunty.

=== Appearance on the Civil Police's list of suspects ===
On 22 December 2022, a G1 news portal article revealed that Thiago had been included in a Civil Police suspect album in an investigation into a rape in the city of São Paulo. The photo had been in this album at least since October of that year. In a statement, the Police said that they "used the digital influencer’s photo due to his physical resemblance to the wanted man".

=== Complaint of police violence ===
On 28 May 2023, Thiago reported being a victim of police violence during an encounter with a friend who was with him at a Virada Cultural show in São Paulo. The influencer also reported that his friend was tortured by law enforcement officers and forced to eat the marijuana cigarette he was carrying. The police also allegedly tried to force him to delete a video he had taken of the encounter at the beginning of the events, and threatened him with arrest.

=== Speech on the reconstruction of Casa Marighella ===
On 10 December 2024, Thiago Torres participated in the launch event for the fundraising campaign to renovate the Casa Marighella and Clara Chaf, located in Salvador, Bahia. The initiative was promoted by popular movements and independent publishers, gathered at the Galpão Cultural Elza Soares, in São Paulo. The event was attended by several personalities from the Brazilian political and cultural scene, such as rappers KL Jay (from Racionais MC1s), Rashid, Don L and other communicators such as Laura Sabino, Paulo Galo, Renato Freitas, among others, speeches were made in defense of the memory and historical importance of the guerrilla fighter Carlos Marighella.

=== Conviction for slander and libel ===
Thiago was convicted in February 2025 for slander and libel after publishing criticisms on social media against the former mayor of Guarulhos, Gustavo Henric Costa (PSD).

The process began after Thiago criticized the former mayor's decision to shut down Proguaru, a company responsible for public services in the city, where his mother worked as a cleaner.

The sentence was handed down by Judge Patrícia Padilha, of the 3rd Criminal Court of the Guarulhos District Court (3ª Vara Criminal do Fórum da Comarca de Guarulhos). The decision mandated community service, payment of R$15,000 in damages, a fine of R$3,000, and the payment of legal fees.

=== Instagram account deleted ===
In November 2025, Thiago Torres' main account, was deactivated by Meta, the company that owns Instagram, causing widespread repercussions on social media and in the press. The profile had over one million followers and was used to publish content about racism, education, criticism of capitalism, and political debates. Meta only stated that the account "did not follow community standards," without detailing which posts or rules had been violated, and did not offer the possibility of direct appeal on the platform.

After his official profile was suspended, Torres created a backup profile, which was also deactivated by Meta a few days later.
