= Frontier Touring =

Concert promoter

- Type: Tour promoter
- Industry: Music and entertainment
- Founded: November 1979
- Founder: Michael Gudinski; Philip Jacobsen; Michael Chugg
- Headquarters: Melbourne, Australia
- Area served: Australia, New Zealand
- Website: www.frontiertouring.com

The Frontier Touring Company Pty Ltd, trading as Frontier Touring and also often known as Frontier, is one of Australia and New Zealand's largest concert promoters. The company was formed in November 1979 by Michael Gudinski as one of the first Mushroom Group ventures, with eight music industry partners. The company's first tour was in 1980 and in the decades since has toured over five hundred acts. In 2013 according to Pollstar, the industry's trade publication, the company was listed as No. 1 Australasian Concert Promoter and at No. 20, internationally.

== History ==
The company originated after Michael Chugg, a freelance tour co-ordinator with Paul Dainty, visited the United Kingdom, when he was taken by Kevin Borich to see a performance of the Police in London. Upon return to Australia, Chugg was unable to convince Dainty to back a local national tour by the Police, which led to Chugg forming a partnership with Michael Gudinski, his former boss at Consolidated Rock Agency.

The Frontier Touring Company was founded in November 1979 by Gudinski, together with Chugg, Phil Jacobsen – a "financial expert and artist manager", Ray Evans, Sam Righi "operations manager of Harbour Booking Agency", Frank Stivala "operations manager of Premier Artists", Glenn Wheatley, Robbie Williams and Steve Wright. When Wheatley and Wright wanted to concentrate on promoting Little River Band in the United States, the other partners bought out their share. In the mid-1980s Williams left the company after falling out with Righi. Gudinski was the face of the Frontier Touring Company, due to his profile with his other business ventures; whilst Chugg was the company's general manager, and Jacobsen was the financial director.

The first tour arranged by Frontier was the UK Squeeze in January 1980, which was followed a month later by The Police, the latter of which remain on Frontier's roster until this day. The next year Frontier arranged Gary Numan's first Australian tour and a second tour by The Police. In October 1980, Chugg justified the promotion of overseas artists by his company when describing how "[i]t's given work to local bands who play the support spots, and also to rock-'n'-roll service industries who have become incredibly proficient in the last couple of years". In August 1981 Glenn A. Baker of Billboard described how the company was "building fringe acts and bringing them up slowly".

In 1999, after twenty-five years with the company, Chugg left Frontier and formed his own entertainment company the following year. Soon after Chugg's departure Jacobsen also decided to leave Frontier although he continued as a financial consultant to the company. In December 2002, Righi resigned as manager of the Frontier Touring Company and as a director of the Harbour Agency.

In 2008 according to Pollstar, the industry's trade publication, the Frontier Trading Company was listed as No. 1 Australasian Concert Promoter and at No. 15, internationally. Main event for Frontier Touring in 2009 was helping stage Australia's Sound Relief event. In 2010, Frontier Touring celebrated its 500th tour with Tom Jones. Frontier Touring also were responsible for the first show in a renewed Hanging Rock in Victoria's Macedon Ranges, the company has an exclusive license at the site until 2018.

In 2011, Frontier released a comprehensive poster book, Every Poster Tells a Story: 30 Years of the Frontier Touring Co. to commemorate the 30 years in operation. In 2013, they were ranked the 16th biggest music promotions company in the world, based on ticket sales, In March 2014, Frontier's Australian tour of The Rolling Stones was postponed due to the sudden death of Mick Jagger's partner.
