= Casey Barnes =

Australian singer-songwriter (born 1978)

- Born: 3 September 1978 (age 48); Tasmania, Australia
- Genres: Country rock; acoustic; pop rock
- Occupations: Singer; songwriter
- Instruments: Vocals; guitar; drums
- Years active: 2004–present
- Labels: Community Music, Chugg Music (former)
- Website: www.caseybarnes.com.au

Casey Barnes is an Australian country rock singer-songwriter from Tasmania, Australia, who is best known as a contestant on the seventh season of Australian Idol in 2009. Barnes won the ARIA Award for Best Country Album in 2022.

Barnes has played alongside Bryan Adams, Diesel, Mariah Carey and Lady A.

== Early life ==
Barnes was born in Tasmania and spent the early years of his life there before moving to the Gold Coast as a teenager. Along with music, he developed a passion for Australian rules football in his younger years and played in the 1999 QAFL reserves premiership winning team for the Southport Sharks alongside future AFL superstar Nick Riewoldt. He decided to quit football in his early twenties to focus on music and began performing in local venues around the Gold Coast in the early 2000s. Two of his cousins, Lachie Weller and Maverick Weller, are professional footballers who played for the Gold Coast Suns.

== Music career ==
=== 2004–2008: Say What You Feel and Casey Barnes ===
In 2004, Barnes, who had been performing around the country for a few years, recorded his first album, titled Say What You Feel.

Barnes was selected to open for Bryan Adams on his 2005 tour for A Day On the Green. Following his set, the demand for his independently released album at the merchandising tent was overwhelming, with over 200 copies selling out.

In April 2006, Barnes released "What The Hell Are You Waiting for?", the lead single from his self-titled album, Casey Barnes, which was released in August 2007. The album featured "honest, passionate music with a rock/pop edge".

In November 2007, Barnes released a duet with Connor Maclean, titled "How Good It Would Be", through Sony BMG. The song was featured on Maclean's Christmas album with all proceeds of the single and album going towards Westmead's Children's Hospital.

In 2008, Australian DJ-producer Marco Demark released a version of Elton John's "Tiny Dancer" featuring Barnes. The track peaked at number 66 in Australia.

=== 2009: Australian Idol ===
In 2009, Barnes entered the seventh series of Australian Idol. He auditioned at the Brisbane auditions and made it to the semi-finals before being eliminated but received a wildcard into the top 12. In the live shows, he performed "(Baby I've Got You) On My Mind" and "I'm Not Over" but was eliminated after week two in September, placing eleventh.

=== 2010–2015: Red Lion Motel, Jet Trails and Flesh & Bone ===
In May 2010, Barnes re-released his 2008 EP, Red Lion Motel. and lead single "I Promise".

In January 2011, Barnes released "Never Break You" which became an anthem after the devastating Queensland floods and Cyclone Yasi. The song became his first to enter the ARIA top 50. Barnes donated all proceeds to the Premier's Disaster Relief Appeal.

In September 2012, Barnes released Jet Trails which he wrote in Nashville with Rick Price and promoted the album with shows in New York, Nashville and Los Angeles. He also performed around Australia, including the main stage of the Caloundra Music Festival.

In June 2014, Barnes released a second EP titled Flesh & Bone which was produced by Price and mixed by Grammy Award winner Jason Leaning. The EP saw the release of four singles, "Valentine", "Flesh and Bone", "Waiting on the Day" and "Hard Times". The tracks received radio airplay nationwide. The track "Waiting on the Day" touched on the sensitive subject of the loss of a child. Drawing on personal experience Barnes said "'Waiting on the Day' is a tribute to every parent who has endured the loss of a child whether that be before or after birth and the strength to face life again. This song is also for our baby Grace who we lost two years ago and will forever be in our hearts".

Later in 2014, Barnes reached the finals of two prestigious US based competitions; International Songwriting Competition and Unsigned Only.

=== 2016–2018: Live as One and The Good Life ===
In July 2016, it was confirmed that Barnes had signed with Social Family Records. Barnes said, "I couldn't be more thrilled to be signing on with Social Family Records…one of the most exciting labels in the country with a strong roster of artists and their finger well and truly on the pulse with where the music industry is headed. With a brand new album coming out the timing couldn't be more perfect and I can't wait for everyone to hear what I think is my best release yet."

Barnes' fourth studio album, Live as One was released in August 2016. The album included song written with Rick Price, Michael Paynter and Michael Delorenzis. Three songs featuring his wife, Michelle Barnes. The album's title track had a video featuring well-known Australians along with national and international sporting identities holding up #LiveAsOne signs. The album's second single "Just like Magic" was released in December 2016 peaked at No. 1 on the Top 40 Country Tracks Chart and the Australian Country Radio Charts.

In June 2017, Barnes released "The Way We Ride" which became a radio favourite and peaked at No. 1 position on the Top 40 Country Tracks for 4 weeks. This song also saw Barnes nominated for his first Golden Guitar Award for Best New Talent. "Keep Me Coming Back" was released in August 2017 and also peaked at No. 1 on the Australian Top 40 Country Tracks. Barnes supported the track with the "Keep Me Coming Back Tour". In February 2018, Barnes released "Ain't Coming Home", the third single from his fourth studio album The Good Life, which was released in March 2018.

In 2017, Barnes was a finalist for Australian Male Artist of the Year and won the Media Impact Award at the Planet Country Music for a New Generation Awards.

In 2018, Barnes won Australian Male Artist of the Year at the Planet Country Music for a New Generation Awards.

=== 2019–2023: Town of a Million Dreams and Light It Up ===
In August 2019 Barnes confirmed he had signed with Chugg Music. Barnes' first album with the label was Town of a Million Dreams which peaked at number 16 on the ARIA Charts.

In February 2022, Barnes released Light It Up which won him his first ARIA Music Award and Country Music Award.

In December 2023, Barnes' "Never Give Up On a Good Time" was used on CBS' New Year's Eve broadcast.

=== 2024: Mayday ===
In April 2024, Barnes announced his eighth album Mayday, preceded by the singles "Summer Nights", "Miracles", "Never Give Up on a Good Time", "Boys Like Me" and "Mayday". It was released on 31 May 2024.

=== 2025—2026: Departure from Chugg Music, Made for This ===
In May 2025, Barnes released "Buy That Girl a Beer", which marked his first new music since 2024's Mayday.

His second release of 2025 was "Rough Around the Edges", which Megan Hopkins of Countrytown described as "a new sonic chapter for Barnes. Alongside his recent single Buy That Girl a Beer, it signals a deliberate lean into punchier, anthemic storytelling."

In September 2025, Barnes and record label Chugg Music announced they had amicably terminated their six-year partnership, signalling the beginning of a new independent period for the musician. He shared the news with the following statement: "The time feels right for a fresh start, and I'm excited to see what new opportunities lie ahead as we continue to build on the amazing momentum both here in Australia and internationally. I can't wait to share the next chapter of this journey."

In February 2026, Barnes released the third single and title track of his then unannounced ninth studio album, Made for This. The country-rock track, described by Megan Hopkins of Countrytown as "a gritty, defiant anthem about resilience and self-belief", was selected as the theme song for Nine Network's 2026 NRL season broadcast, being played at the beginning of each televised game.

"Made for This" also marked Barnes' first release via Community Music, the music distribution and artist services arm of leading Australian independent music company UNIFIED Music Group.

On 8 May 2026, Barnes released "Time to Burn", his first collaboration with Australian artist Pete Murray. Shortly thereafter, Barnes formally announced that his ninth studio album would be titled Made for This, and that it would be released on 7 August 2026. Subsequently, he announced the Made for This Tour, with performances taking place across Queensland, Victoria, New South Wales and Tasmania, from August to September 2026.

== Discography ==
Casey Barnes discography
- Studio albums: 10
- Extended plays: 2

=== Studio albums ===
Title	Details	Peak positions
Title	Details	AUS
Say What You Feel	Released: 2004; Label: Fantastic Ideas (FICB001); Format: CD	—
What the Hell Are You Waiting For?	Released: 2005; Label: Casey Barnes Music (CDB002); Format: CD, Digital download	—
Casey Barnes	Released: 2007; Label: Casey Barnes Music; Format: CD, digital download	—
Jet Trails	Released: 21 September 2012; Label: Casey Barnes Music; Format: CD, Digital download	—
Live as One	Released: 26 August 2016; Label: Social Family; Format: Digital download	97
The Good Life	Released: 9 March 2018; Label: Casey Barnes (CBS1801); Format: Digital download	—
Town of a Million Dreams	Released: 17 April 2020; Label: Chugg Music (CHG021); Format: Digital download, CD, streaming	16
Light It Up	Released: 25 February 2022; Label: Chugg Music (CHG029); Format: Digital download, CD, streaming, LP	17
Mayday	Released: 31 May 2024; Label: Chugg Music (CHG035); Format: Digital download, CD, streaming, LP	11
Made for This	Released: 7 August 2026; Label: Community Music (CM239); Format: CD, LP, digital download, streaming	6

=== Extended plays ===
Title	Details
Red Lion Motel	Released: 2008; Label: Casey Barnes; Format: CD, digital download
Flesh & Bone	Released: June 2014; Label: Casey Barnes; Format: CD, digital download

=== Charted or certified singles ===
Year	Title	Peak positions	Certification	Album
Year	Title	AUS	Certification	Album
2008	"Tiny Dancer" (Marco Demark featuring Casey Barnes)	66		Non-album single
2011	"Never Break You"	47		Jet Trails
2021	"God Took His Time on You"	—	ARIA: Gold	Light It Up

== Awards and nominations ==
=== AIR Awards ===
The Australian Independent Record Awards (known colloquially as the AIR Awards) is an annual awards night to recognise, promote and celebrate the success of Australia's Independent Music sector.

Year	Nominee / work	Award	Result	Ref.
2021	Town of a Million Dreams	Best Independent Country Album or EP	Nominated	
2022	"God Took His Time on You"	Independent Song of the Year	Nominated	
2023	Light It Up	Best Independent Country Album or EP	Nominated	

=== APRA Awards ===
The APRA Awards are several award ceremonies run in Australia by the Australasian Performing Right Association (APRA) to recognise composing and song writing skills, sales and airplay performance by its members annually.

Year	Nominee / work	Award	Result	Ref.
2021	"A Little More"	Most Performed Country Work	Nominated	
2022	"Come Turn Me On"	Most Performed Country Work of the Year	Nominated	
2023	"God Took His Time on You"	Most Performed Country Work of the Year	Won	
2024	"Summer Nights"	Most Performed Country Work of the Year	Won	
2025	"Mayday"	Most Performed Country Work of the Year	Nominated	
2026	"Buy That Girl a Beer"	Most Performed Country Work of the Year	Nominated	

=== ARIA Music Awards ===
The ARIA Music Awards is an annual awards ceremony that recognises excellence, innovation, and achievement across all genres of Australian music.

Year	Nominee / work	Award	Result	Ref.
2020	Town of a Million Dreams	Best Country Album	Nominated	
2022	Light It Up	Best Country Album	Won	
2024	Mayday	Best Country Album	Nominated	

=== Country Music Awards of Australia ===
The Country Music Awards of Australia is an annual awards night held in January during the Tamworth Country Music Festival. Celebrating recording excellence in the Australian country music industry. They commenced in 1973.

Year	Nominee / work	Award	Result	Ref.
2018	Casey Barnes	Best New Talent	Nominated	
2020	Casey Barnes ("A Little More")	Best New Talent	Nominated	
2021	Town of a Million Dreams	Album of the Year	Nominated	
2021	Town of a Million Dreams	Contemporary Country Album of the Year	Nominated	
2021	Casey Barnes	Male Artist of the Year	Nominated	
2021	"No Other You" (with Missy Lancaste)	Vocal Collaboration of the Year	Nominated	
2022	"God Took His Time On You"	Single of the Year	Nominated	
2022	Casey Barnes	Male Artist of the Year	Nominated	
2023	"Get to Know Ya"	Single of the Year	Nominated	
2023	"Get to Know Ya"	Song of the Year	Nominated	
2023	Casey Barnes	Male Artist of the Year	Nominated	
2023	Light It Up	Contemporary Country Album of the Year	Nominated	
2023	Light It Up	Album of the Year	Won	
2023	Light It Up	Top Selling Album of the Year	Won	
2024	"Summer Nights"	Single of the Year	Nominated	
2024	"Boys Like Me"	Song of the Year	Nominated	
2024	Casey Barnes	Male Artist of the Year	Nominated	
2025	Mayday	Album of the Year	Nominated	
2025	Mayday	Contemporary Country Album of the Year	Won	
2025	Male Artist of the Year	Casey Barnes	Nominated	
2027	"Time to Burn" (with Pete Murray)	Vocal Collaboration of the Year	Pending	

=== Gold Coast Music Awards ===
The Gold Coast Music Awards are an annual awards ceremony that recognises musicians from the Gold Coast area.

Year	Nominee / work	Award	Result	Ref.
2015		People's Choice	Won	
2020	Casey Barnes	Artist of the year	Won	
2021	Casey Barnes	Artist of the year	Won	
2022	Casey Barnes	Artist of the year	Won	
2022	Casey Barnes	Hall of Fame	inducted	

=== Queensland Music Awards ===
The Queensland Music Awards (previously known as Q Song Awards) are annual awards celebrating Queensland, Australia's brightest emerging artists and established legends. They commenced in 2006.

Year	Nominee / work	Award	Result (wins only)	Ref.
2022	"God Took His Time on You"	Country Song of the Year	Won	
