= Laura Sabino =

Brazilian YouTuber and politician

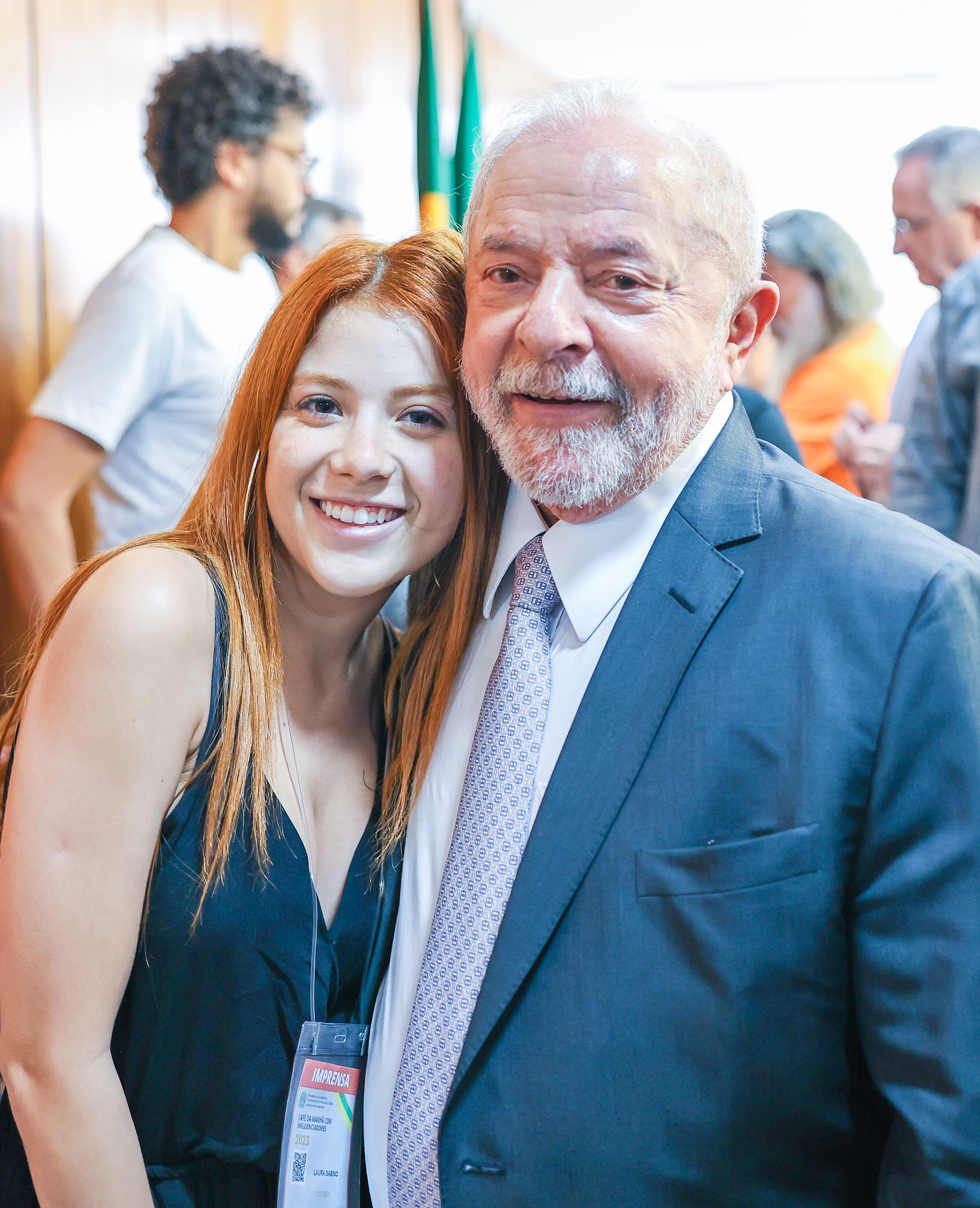
- Sabino with Lula da Silva in February 2023
- Born: 1999 (age 26–27); Ribeirão das Neves, Brazil
- Education: Federal University of Minas Gerais
- Occupations: Politician, YouTuber

Laura Sabino (born 1999 in Ribeirão das Neves) is a Brazilian historian, political commentator, YouTuber, columnist, and lecturer. Before establishing herself as a digital communicator, she was involved in urban and rural social movements, participating in solidarity kitchens, political education initiatives in occupations and rural settlements, and projects supporting women affected by gender-based violence. Sabino began publishing educational content on social media when discussions of politics and history remained relatively uncommon on Brazilian platforms. She later gained a large online audience and has been described by Brazilian media as one of the leading figures in left-wing political education on social media. In 2022, she opened Luiz Inácio Lula da Silva's presidential pre-campaign event in 2022.

== Personal life ==
Laura Sabino was born Ribeirão das Neves, in the Metropolitan Region of Belo Horizonte, raised on the outskirts of the city she became involved in community organizing from an early age. During her youth, she participated in initiatives supporting women affected by gender-based violence coordinated solidarity kitchens,and organized political education activities in urban occupations and rural settlements. She also helped establish Cursinho Popular de Neves, a community-based educational project that provided preparation for Brazil's National High School Examination (ENEM), tutoring, psychological support, and a community library.

Sabino was also active in Ocupa Curumim,a grassroots movement that campaigned for the restoration of a public space in Ribeirão das Neves for cultural, educational, and sports activities. Following negotiations with local authoritiess, the movement contributed to the site's revitalization. During her childhood,she,she accompanied her father in educational activities carried out through the National Program for Education in Agrarian Reform (PRONERA), an experience she has cited as influential in shaping her political outlook.

Sabino earned a degree in History from the Federal University of Minas Gerais (UFMG).

Her family has longstanding ties to rural social movements.She is the great-granddaughter of Aristides Sabino, who was involved in agrarian struggles and the daughter of educator Heli Sabino de Oliveira, a professor at the Federal University of Minas Gerais (UFMG).

In 2022, Sabino lost five family members in a car accident on the GO-139 highway in Piracanjuba, Goiás. A photo of her with the politician Lula has been used as the basis for manipulated images circulated as fake news. Sabino has previously worked as a children's party entertainer.

== Political activity ==
In 2016, she participated in the wave of occupations of secondary schools.

She is a Marxist and an activist of the MST (Landless Workers' Movement), whose cap she wears as her trademark. She is considered one of the most prominent YouTubers associated with left-wing political education. In this capacity, she was chosen to open the launching event of the pre-candidacy of Luiz Inácio Lula da Silva, the candidate for the Workers' Party in the 2022 presidential elections. The event took place on May 9, 2022, at the Expominas in Gameleira, in the western region of Belo Horizonte.

Sabino began her political activity on social media in 2019, aiming to provide accessible knowledge to the poor and marginalized population. By May 2022, Sabino had 116,000 subscribers on YouTube, 138,000 followers on Twitter, and 123,000 on Instagram. She also participated on TikTok. Due to her presence on social media, she faced backlash and attacks from the far-right on these platforms.

In July 2022, following the public exposure of a video featuring a 14-year-old transgender girl filmed in a women's restroom, which was posted by Nikolas Ferreira, then a city councilor in Belo Horizonte from the Liberal Party, Sabino challenged the councilor to a Muay Thai fight, labeling him as a coward.

Sabino identifies herself as a supporter of the ideas of Antonio Gramsci, advocating for the importance of political education to break the ideological dominance of the ruling classes. She also argues that society is currently witnessing the failure of capitalism and that social democracy is not sufficient to solve social problems.

== See also ==
- Pink tide
- Youth in Brazil
