= Brianna Mazzola =

- Born: August 24, 2000 (age 26); Philadelphia, Pennsylvania, US
- Occupation: Musician
- Years active: 2010s-present
- Label: Hitco

Brianna Mazzola (born August 24, 2000) is an American musician. She has been a member of The Mickey Mouse Club and 3Quency.

== Biography ==
Mazzola was born in Philadelphia and is of Italian descent. She performed at the Apollo Theater aged 12 and moved to Los Angeles a year later. She also appeared in the short films Lived and Welcome to the Special People's Club in the early 2010s. She then appeared in the films Another Assembly (2014), The Greys (2015), and Sable (2017).

Mazzola was announced for the cast of the variety show The Mickey Mouse Club in September 2017. At the time, she cited inspiration from female musicians with powerful voices such as Beyoncé, Rihanna, and Jessie J. After finishing with the show, she signed to a recording contract with Hitco. During that contract, she began applying makeup in the shape of an audio wave. She has stated that she was inspired to do so as a homage to superheroes and the Marvel Cinematic Universe, having been asked what her unique selling point was. The label dropped her in 2020.

Mazzola provided background vocals for "G", a 2023 song from Avenged Sevenfold's album Life Is But a Dream.... Later that year, she provided the voice for Velvet in the animated film Trolls Band Together. She sung a cover version of "Sweet Dreams (Are Made of This)" by Eurythmics for the film and performed two tracks on its soundtrack, the Andrew Rannells duets "Watch Me Work" and "Mount Rageous".

Mazzola filmed episodes of Netflix's reality TV series Building the Band in September 2024. On the programme, she formed the band 3Quency with Nori Royale and Wennely Quezada, the latter of whom had also auditioned for Mickey Mouse Club. The band took their name from 'three' and 'frequency', a reference to Mazzola's makeup. The band won the series in July 2025 and subsequently released the singles "Top Down", "Once I Was a Good Girl", "Clique", "This Christmas", and "Telephone". In a December 2025 interview with Sweety High, Mazzola stated that a lot of her "foundation was the Philadelphia International sound in Motown" and that she was inspired by what she described as "powerhouse" vocalists such as Aretha Franklin, Beyoncé, Michael Jackson, Whitney Houston, Mariah Carey, Brandy Norwood, and Jazmine Sullivan.

== Filmography ==
- Lived (short, 2011)
- Welcome to the Special People's Club (short, 2014)
- Another Assembly (Carly, 2014)
- The Greys (Katie, 2015)
- The Voice (sixth episode of season 10, 2016)
- Sable (Karen, 2017)
- The Mickey Mouse Club (2017-8)
- Trolls Band Together (Velvet, 2023)
- Building the Band (2025)

== Discography ==
=== Singles ===
==== As lead artist ====
- "Love Game" (2019)
- "I Know a Guy" (2023)
- "I Wanna Love You But IDK How" (2023)
- "Sweet Dreams (Are Made of This)" (2024)
- "Pick Ur Poison" (2024)

==== As featured artist ====
- "Good to You" (Global Wellness Day, Brianna Mazzola, 2023)

=== Other appearances ===
- "G" (Avenged Sevenfold, background vocals, Life Is But a Dream..., 2023)
- "Watch Me Work" (Andrew Rannells, Brianna Mazzola, Trolls Band Together, 2023)
- "Mount Rageous" (Andrew Rannells, Brianna Mazzola, Trolls Band Together, 2023)
