= 3Quency =

American girl group

- Origin: Los Angeles, U.S.
- Genres: Pop; R&B
- Years active: 2024–present
- Labels: RECORDS; Columbia; Sony Music
- Members: Brianna Mazzola; Nori Moore; Wennely Quezada
- Website: 3quencyofficial.com

3Quency is an American girl group that formed on the Netflix series Building the Band. After forming themselves throughout the process of the series, they went on to win. 3Quency is composed of Brianna Mazzola, Nori Moore, and Wennely Quezada.

== History ==
Building the Band performances and results
Round	Brianna Mazzola	Song choice	Wennely Quezada
Round	Brianna Mazzola	Nori Royale	Wennely Quezada
Auditions	"River"	"Greedy"	"Water"
Performance 1	"Levitating"		
Performance 2	"Kill Bill"		
Performance 3	"Made for Me"		
Performance 4	"Bad Guy"		
Semi-final	"Have You Ever?"		
Final	"Have Mercy"		
Final	"Always Be My Baby"		

Among the contestants to audition for the 2024 series Building the Band were Brianna Mazzola, who was from Philadelphia; Wennely Quezada, who was of Dominican descent; and Nori Moore, who performs under the name Nori Royale and was midway through a gap year at the time. Mazzola and Quezada had previously spent a month working on an audition together in their mid-teens. The pair initially connected with two other contestants, Moore and Bri Gilyard, before dismissing Gilyard, as they wanted to form a trio in the vein of Destiny's Child and TLC.

The group individually rehearsed for a performance of "Levitating" by Dua Lipa; their performance of the song marked the first time the members met. The band took their name from a portmanteau of 'three' and 'frequency', a reference to Mazzola's makeup incorporating an audio wave. They then performed SZA's "Kill Bill", Muni Long's "Made for Me", Billie Eilish's "Bad Guy", and Brandy Norwood's "Have You Ever?" on the programme.

3Quency reprised their "Made for Me" performance for Netflix Summer Break, a promotional vehicle for participants of other Netflix shows broadcast seven episodes in. Long and three other bands from Building the Band also performed. After performing Chloe Bailey's "Have Mercy" and Mariah Carey's "Always Be My Baby" in the final, they were voted as the winning group of Building the Band by the judging panel and won the show's $500,000 prize.

The band announced that they had signed record deals with Sony Music and Columbia Records in August 2025 and released their debut single the following month: "Top Down," a contemporary R&B song produced by TBHits. The band subsequently toured with Soulidified, another group formed on Building the Band. In November, they released the singles "Once I Was A Good Girl" and "Clique"; the former was a song about heartbreak co-written by Raye and Steve Mac. They also released a take on Donny Hathaway's "This Christmas" around that time and their track "Telephone" in March. In June, they released a video for the single "Girls Talk", announced that their planned EP had bloated into an album of the same name, and that they would be postponing their tour on quality grounds.

== Discography ==
=== Studio albums ===
Title	Details
Girls Talk	Released: TBA 2027; Formats: Digital download, streaming, CD

=== Extended Plays ===
List of extended play albums, with release details
Title	Details
Telephone	Released: 13 February 2026; Label: RECORDS Label, LLC, Columbia Records; Formats: Digital download, streaming

=== Singles ===
List of singles, showing year released
Title	Year	Album
"Top Down"	2025	Telephone
"Once I Was A Good Girl"	2025	Telephone
"Clique"	2025	Telephone
"Telephone"	2026	Telephone
"Girls Talk"	2026	Girls Talk
"Leave 'Em Alone"	2026	Girls Talk

=== Promotional singles ===
List of promotional singles, showing year released
Title	Year	Album
"Kill Bill"	2025	Non-album promotional singles
"Bad Guy"	2025	Non-album promotional singles
"Have You Ever?"	2025	Non-album promotional singles
"Always Be My Baby"	2025	Non-album promotional singles
"This Christmas"	2025	Non-album promotional singles
