= Teenage Dads =

Australian indie rock band from Victoria

- Origin: Mornington Peninsula, Victoria, Australia
- Genres: Indie rock; psychedelic pop
- Years active: 2015–present
- Label: Chugg
- Members: Jordan Finlay; Connor McLaughlin; Vincent Kinna; Angus Christie
- Past members: Reece Pellow
- Website: teenagedadsofficial.com

Teenage Dads are an Australian indie rock band formed in the Mornington Peninsula, Victoria in 2015. The group consists of Jordan Finlay (vocals, guitar, keyboards), Connor McLaughlin (guitar), Vincent Kinna (drums) and Angus Christie (bass guitar). Since 2021, they have been signed to Chugg.

The band has released two studio albums, Potpourri Lake (2018) and Majordomo (2024), and four EPs, most recently Midnight Driving (2023), which debuted at number 28 on the ARIA Charts. At the 2023 ARIA Awards, Teenage Dads won the Michael Gudinski Breakthrough Artist Award.

== History ==
Teenage Dads was formed by self-taught musicians Jordan Finlay and Connor McLaughlin in Mount Eliza, Victoria in 2015, with Angus Christie and Vincent Kinna joining the band later. Meeting in their final years of high school, they played their first show in 2017.

In September 2017, they released their five-track debut EP Wett Weather. Their debut studio album, Potpourri Lake, was released on 26 October 2018. It is described by the band as "mixed bag of sorts", with it "not sticking to genre clichés". "Sunburnt", the third single from the album, was the first from the band to receive airplay on Triple J. In May 2019, the band released their second EP, Red.

The band signed with Chugg Music in April 2021. Three singles were released in anticipation for the band's third EP – "Thank You for the Honey, Honey" (September 2020) and "Cheerleader" (July 2021) – "Piano Girl" was released alongside the full record, Club Echo, in November. They cited the Strokes and Phoenix as influences for the record, which thematically "centres around the last five years of our lives as a band".

In 2022, the band distributed three singles promoting their upcoming project. "Exit Sign" was released in April, described by Ellie Robinson of NME as featuring "bright, jangly lead guitars and clicky drums with heartfelt, warmly sung vocal runs and a soulful, buzzing bassline". "Teddy" and "Hey, Diego!" followed in August and November respectively. In February 2023, the band announced the forthcoming release of Midnight Driving. Upon release, the band said: "The EP is about perspective. How things look from one point of view, and how they can change over time from another outlook. The songs feel like diary entries, documented internally, like conversations you have with yourself when you go midnight driving. A constant, internal form of therapy almost."

In August 2024, the band released their second studio album, Majordomo. It was supported by five singles including "Speedracer" and "I Like It".

In August 2025, the group released "Stay Between Us" ahead of EP My Memento.

== Band members ==
Current members

- Jordan Finlay – lead vocals, keyboards, rhythm guitar
- Vincent Kinna – drums, backing vocals
- Connor McLaughlin – lead guitar, backing vocals
- Angus Christie – bass guitar, backing vocals

Former members

- Reece Pellow – lead guitar

== Discography ==
=== Studio albums ===
List of studio albums, with details shown
Title	Details	Peak chart positions
Title	Details	AUS
Potpourri Lake	Released: 26 October 2018; Label: Teenage Dads; Formats: CD, digital	—
Majordomo	Released: 23 August 2024; Label: Chugg (CHUGG038); Formats: CD, LP, digital	2

=== Extended plays ===
List of EPs, with details shown
Title	Details	Peak chart positions
Title	Details	AUS
Wett Weather	Released: 11 September 2017; Label: Teenage Dads; Formats: Digital download, streaming	—
Red	Released: 15 May 2019; Label: Teenage Dads; Formats: Digital download, streaming	—
Club Echo	Released: 5 November 2021; Label: Chugg (CHUGG030); Formats: LP, digital download, streaming	—
Midnight Driving	Released: 3 March 2023; Label: Chugg (CHUGG033); Formats: CD, LP, digital download, streaming	28
My Memento	Released: 22 August 2025; Label: Chugg (tba}; Formats: CD, LP, digital download, streaming	TBA

=== Singles ===
List of singles, with release year and album shown
Title	Year	Album
"Devil's Jam"	2018	Potpourri Lake
"Fool"	2018	Potpourri Lake
"Sunburnt"	2018	Potpourri Lake
"Message in the Sand"	2019	Red
"Parking Ticket"	2019	Red
"Vile Crocodile"	2019	Non-album singles
"Pocket Money"	2019	Non-album singles
"Adrenaline Rush"	2020	Non-album singles
"Thank You for the Honey, Honey"	2020	Club Echo
"Cheerleader"	2021	Club Echo
"Piano Girl"	2021	Club Echo
"Exit Sign"	2022	Midnight Driving
"Teddy"	2022	Midnight Driving
"Hey, Diego!"	2022	Midnight Driving
"Video Killed the Radio Star" (Like a Version)	2023	Non-album single
"Midnight Driving"	2023	Midnight Driving
"Speedracer"	2023	Majordomo
"I Like It"	2023	Majordomo
"Tale of a Man"	2023	Majordomo
"Weaponz"	2024	Majordomo
"Boyfriend"	2024	Majordomo
"Boarding Pass"	2024	Majordomo
"Stay Between Us"	2025	My Memento
"Alone Again for Christmas"	2025	Non-album single
"Find a Way"	2026	

== Tours ==
- Ready Teddy Go! Tour, 2022
- Exit Sign Tour, 2022
- Midnight Driving Tour, 2023
- Australia & New Zealand tour, 2023
- Majordomo Australia & New Zealand Tour, 2024

== Awards and nominations ==
=== ARIA Music Awards ===
The ARIA Music Awards is an annual award ceremony event celebrating the Australian music industry.

Year	Nominee / work	Award	Result	Ref.
2023	Midnight Driving	Michael Gudinski Breakthrough Artist	Won	

=== J Awards ===
The J Awards are an annual series of Australian music awards that were established by the Australian Broadcasting Corporation's youth-focused radio station Triple J. They commenced in 2005.

Year	Nominee / work	Award	Result	Ref.
2024	Teenage Dads	Australian Album of the Year	Nominated	

=== Rolling Stone Australia Awards ===
The Rolling Stone Australia Awards are awarded annually by the Australian edition of Rolling Stone magazine for outstanding contributions to popular culture in the previous year.

Year	Nominee / work	Award	Result	Ref.
2022	Teenage Dads	Best New Artist	Nominated	
2024	Midnight Driving	Best Record	Nominated	
