= Alison Holloway =

English journalist and producer (born 1961)

Alison Holloway (born 2 February 1961) is an English journalist and producer, now living in the United States. She was the original presenter of Sky Television's Sky World News Tonight and is now a network television entertainment show producer based in the US.

== Early career ==
Born in London, she grew up Battersea, and attended the nearby Italia Conti Academy of Theatre Arts.

She co-presented ITV's Olympic Games coverage in 1988, and moved to Sky at the launch of Sky News in 1989. She helped launch the Southeast edition of Meridian Tonight in 1993. She also hosted the current affairs show Newsline, as well as numerous news, game, and quiz shows, and was correspondent for the 1994 Whitbread Round the World Yacht Race and ITV's Rugby World Cup, and London-based correspondent for the American programmes Hard Copy (Paramount Television) and A Current Affair (Fox).

== Personal life ==
At the age of 21 she married Alistair Watson, son of actor Jack Watson, in 1982 at Bristol Register Office. She met Jim Davidson in December 1986. Davidson married her in Bristol on 19 February 1987. They divorced on 31 August 1988.

At the age of 28 she married again. She married for a fourth time in April 1996.
