= Tour promoter =

People responsible for organizing live concerts

Tour promoters (also known as concert promoters or talent buyers) are the individuals or companies responsible for organizing a live concert tour or special event performance. The tour promoter makes an offer of engagement to a particular artist, usually through the artist's agent or music manager. The promoter and agent then negotiate the live performance contract. The majority of live performance contracts are drawn up using the American Federation of Musicians (AFM) standard contract format known as the AFM Performance Agreement.

== Services ==
Included among the tour promoter's various job responsibilities are: (1) obtaining venue, concert hall, theater, nightclub or arena bookings; (2) pricing the event or tour; and (3) providing air, sea or land transportation (optional). However the promoter must have upfront cash and or sponsorship financing to pay for advertising the tours of the artists. Such advertising costs, usually referred to as a Media or Promotional Kit, commonly include television and radio advertisements, posters, newspaper and magazine adverts, online marketing and so on.

== Promoter compensation ==
There are no figures available concerning how much an average concert promoter makes annually. Like most music industry professions, compensation depends on the level of success possessed by the artist the promoter works with, location, and what a given market will bear. The promoter assumes all the financial risk in putting on a show, so compensation also depends on how successful the promoter is at negotiating with vendors and creating sold-out shows. Additionally, in-depth knowledge of their operating market and audience characteristics are critical success factors for any tour promoter.

== Industry overview ==
The rise of large corporation mega-promoters over the past ten years has made it much more difficult for aspiring tour promoters to break into the industry. Live Nation (previously known as Clear Channel Entertainment) is the number one concert promoter in the world according to figures released by Pollstar Magazine in 2006. The Beverly Hills, California-based corporation accounted for about $1.3 billion in concert box-office sales during 2005, according to Billboard magazine's tracking. Anschutz Entertainment Group (AEG Live) was ranked second with $417 million, followed by House of Blues (HOB Entertainment) at number three with $245 million. On July 5, 2006, Live Nation purchased HOB Entertainment for $350 million, further expanding their market share in the live-music business.

While average ticket prices jumped to roughly $57 in 2005, the number of tickets sold for the 100 biggest tours dipped 3.5%, to 36.3 million. Some fans have complained to government officials, particularly after they found tickets to the same concerts or sporting events available – sometimes at many times the face value – on secondary sellers like Stubhub.com and TicketsNow minutes after the public sale began. After hearing from some would-be ticket buyers, the Missouri attorney general announced the state was suing three ticket resellers on charges they violated state consumer protection laws. That same day, the Arkansas attorney general said he was seeking documents from five resellers. And the attorney general's office in Pennsylvania is also looking into the ticket sale business after receiving several hundred complaints over the recent sale of tickets for a Hannah Montana concert in Pittsburgh.

=== Live Nation and Ticketmaster ===
On December 21, 2007, Live Nation announced it would acquire the software and services to ramp up its ticket-selling operation, potentially positioning the company to compete directly with its longtime contractor, Ticketmaster.

Live Nation, the largest concert promoter, and Ticketmaster Entertainment, the No. 1 ticket seller, announced merger on February 10, 2009. Then on January 25, 2010, the U.S. Department of Justice approved the merger with terms that include that Ticketmaster sell Paciolan, its ticketing and software services unit, to Comcast's sports and entertainment firm or "another buyer suitable to the department."

Ticketmaster must also license its software to Anschutz Entertainment Group (AEG), the company's largest customer. With a copy of the Ticketmaster software, AEG will be able to market an attractive ticketing system to venues, according to the DOJ; under the settlement terms, both companies will be able to compete head-to-head with Ticketmaster.

=== College concert market ===
Colleges can provide "dedicated fans, an excellent testing ground, eager workers, [and] loyal fans." The college market provides a network of new potential fans that artists, labels, agents, and managers could focus on for promotion. The major record labels have departments dedicated to college promotion and hire students as representatives for all the artists on these labels. Sony Music Entertainment has a college marketing department, which promotes records released by Sony and by their independent label affiliates. Other music marketing companies such as Cornerstone Promotion focus on college marketing. Cornerstone Promotion hires representatives from colleges all around the country to implement small scale marketing campaigns on their campuses. Artists began breaking into the college market in the 1990s. Billboard Magazine published articles dating back to the early-mid nineties urging artists and agents to take advantage of the college market. Artists such as Dave Matthews Band and R.E.M. played college shows to increase their presence in the college market in the nineties. Billboard Magazine has emphasized the extent to which college concerts can help an artist in multiple articles.

== Education ==
There are numerous degree programs and academic courses focusing on concert promotion and venue management. Some of these are full degree programs, while others are certificates offered for post-graduate studies. For example, New York University offers a Certificate in Meeting, Conference, and Event Management, and a Certificate in Sports Marketing.

== See also ==
- Music industry
- Music management
- Impresario
- Live Nation
- Ticketmaster
- Promoter (entertainment)
