= Chugg Entertainment =

Australia and New Zealand concert promoter

- Trade name: Chugg Entertainment
- Company type: Tour promoter
- Industry: Music & Entertainment
- Founded: 2000
- Founder: Michael Chugg
- Headquarters: Melbourne, Australia
- Area served: Australia & New Zealand
- Website: www.chuggentertainment.com

Chugg Entertainment (formerly Michael Chugg Entertainment) is an Australia and New Zealand concert promoters and has toured major international acts to Australia including Dolly Parton, Coldplay, Radiohead, Elton John, Pearl Jam, Robbie Williams and Florence + The Machine.

The company was founded in 2000 by Michael Chugg following his departure of Frontier Touring Company. In 2004, Matthew Lazarus-Hall joined Chugg Entertainment and became a partner in the business. In 2005, the company re-launched as Chugg Entertainment.

In 2012, Chugg Entertainment launches Chugg Music, the management and label arm of the business. In 2014, Chugg expanded the label into USA.

Chugg Music artists include:

- Andrew Lambrou (via City Pop Records)
- Avalanche City
- Casey Barnes
- JXN (via City Pop Records)
- Lime Cordiale
- Mason Watts (via City Pop Records)
- Mia Rodriguez (via City Pop Records)
- Midnight 'Til Morning
- Sheppard
- Teenage Dads
