= Wé Ani =

Singer songwriter

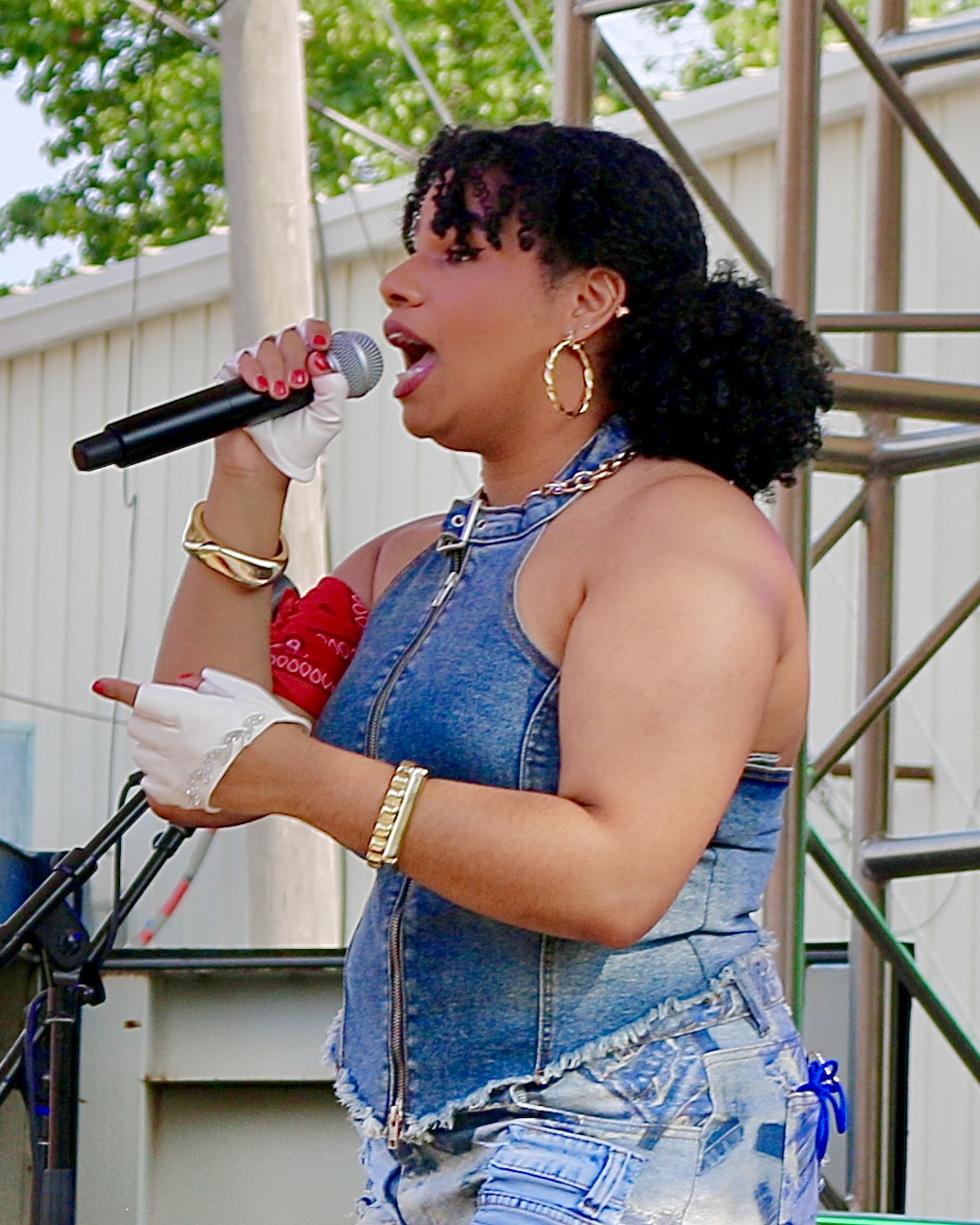
- Wé Ani performs at the 2025 19/Idol/BMG CMA Fest Takeover in Nashville, TN.

Background information
- Born: Wé McDonald; January 23, 1999 (age 27); Harlem, New York, United States
- Genres: Dance; pop; R&B
- Occupations: singer, songwriter, musician
- Instruments: vocalist, congas, bass, guitar, piano
- Years active: 2012-present
- Labels: AHM Records, Del Oro Music
- Website: weanimusic.com

Wé McDonald (born January 13, 1999), known professionally as Wé Ani, is an American singer and songwriter. She finished in third place in the 11th season on NBC's talent singing competition The Voice on Team Alicia Keys. Her first single, "Dance The Night Away", debuted on the Billboard Dance Club Songs chart at #50 on July 7, 2018, and reached its peak at #33 on July 28, 2018. It spent a total of seven weeks on the chart. "Dance The Night Away," written by Ani, Robert Eibach and David Longoria, featured remixes by producer Robert Eibach, ChudaBeats, HuDanz, DJ Chris Z and hi5. Her second single "Confession" peaked on the Billboard Club Songs chart on September 28, 2019. She finished in fifth place in the 21st season on ABC's talent singing competition American Idol. She is currently working on her debut album in Los Angeles, California.

== Early life ==
Wé Ani was born on January 23, 1999, in Harlem and was raised between there and New Jersey. She now uses Wé Ani as her name, saying that "Ani" is Swahili for "diligence".

== Career ==
=== 2016: The Voice ===
Ani appeared on season 11 of NBC's The Voice, in the fall of 2016. She got a four chair turn during the auditions, and chose to be part of Alicia Keys's team on the show.

– Studio version of performance reached the top 10 on iTunes

Stage	Song	Original Artist	Date	Order	Result
Blind Audition	"Feeling Good"	Nina Simone	September 20, 2016	2.4	All four chairs turned Joined Team Alica
Battle Rounds (Top 48)	"Maybe" (vs. Lauren Diaz)	The Chantels	October 10, 2016	7.6	Saved by Coach
Knockout Rounds (Top 32)	"No More Drama" (vs. Courtnie Ramirez)	Mary J. Blige	October 26, 2016	11.5	Saved by Coach
Live Playoffs (Top 24)	"Home"	Stephanie Mills	November 7, 2016	15.3	Saved by Public Vote
Live Top 12	"Take Me to Church"	Hozier	November 14, 2016	16.7	Saved by Public Vote
Live Top 11	"Love on the Brain"	Rihanna	November 21, 2016	18.11	Saved by Public Vote
Live Top 10	"God Bless the Child"	Billie Holiday	November 28, 2016	20.7	Saved by Public Vote
Live Semi-finals (Top 8)	"Scars to Your Beautiful"	Alessia Cara	December 5, 2016	22.6	Saved by Public Vote
Live Finals (Top 4)	"Don't Rain on My Parade"	Barbra Streisand	December 12, 2015	26.12	3rd place
Live Finals (Top 4)	"Ave Maria" (with Alicia Keys)	Traditional	December 12, 2015	26.6	3rd place
Live Finals (Top 4)	"Wishes"	Wé McDonald (original)	December 12, 2015	26.3	3rd place

Non Competition Performances:
Order	Collaborators	Song	Original Artist
19.2	Alicia Keys and Christian Cuevas	"People Get Ready"	The Impressions
21.1	Dolly Parton, Jennifer Nettles, Austin Allsup, Ali Caldwell, Christian Cuevas, Brendan Fletcher, Josh Gallagher, Aaron Gibson, Billy Gilman, Courtney Harrell, and Sundance Head	"Circle of Love"	Dolly Parton
25.1	Stevie Wonder, Ariana Grande, Austin Allsup, Ali Caldwell, Christian Cuevas, Brendan Fletcher, Josh Gallagher, Aaron Gibson, Billy Gilman, Courtney Harrell, Sundance Head, Sa'Rayah, Darby Walker	"Faith"	Stevie Wonder and Ariana Grande
25.3	John Legend	"Love Me Now"	John Legend
25.9	Aaron Gibson, Brendan Fletcher, and Darby Walker	"Love Lockdown"	Kanye West

=== 2023: American Idol ===
Ani appeared on season 21 of ABC's American Idol, in the spring of 2023. She placed fifth overall in the competition.

Episode	Theme	Song Choice	Original Artist	Order Number	Result
Audition	Auditioner's Choice	"Anyone"	Demi Lovato	N/A	Advanced
Hollywood Round, Part 1	Contestant's Choice	"Good For"	Herself	N/A	Advanced
Hollywood Round, Part 2	Group Performance	"Hit 'Em Up Style (Oops!)" (with PJAE)	Blu Cantrell	N/A	Advanced
Showstopper round/Top 55	Contestant's Choice	"Ain't No Way"	Aretha Franklin	N/A	Advanced
Top 26	Contestant's Choice	"Midnight Sky"	Miley Cyrus	N/A	Safe
Top 20	Contestant's Choice	"Skyfall"	Adele	20	Safe
Top 20	Contestant's Choice	"This is Me"	The Greatest Showman	1	Safe
Top 12	Contestant's Choice	"Something's Got a Hold on Me"	Etta James	8	Safe
Top 10	Judges' Choice (Luke Bryan)	"I Have Nothing"	Whitney Houston	3	Safe
Top 7	Alanis Morissette & Ed Sheeran song	"Uninvited"	Alanis Morissette	10	Safe
Top 7	Alanis Morissette & Ed Sheeran song	"Perfect" (with Warren Peay)	Ed Sheeran	5	Safe
Top 5	Disney	"Into the Unknown"	Frozen	1	Eliminated
Top 5	Disney	"The Climb"	Hannah Montana: The Movie	6	Eliminated

Non-competition performances:
Episode	Collaborator(s)	Song	Original Artist
Top 5	Top 5 with Sara Bareilles	"When You Wish Upon a Star"	Pinocchio
Finale	Top 12 with Pitbull & Lil Jon	"Give Me Everything"	Pitbull
Finale	Top 12 with Lionel Richie	"Sail On"	Commodores
Finale	Jazmine Sullivan	"Bust Your Windows"	Jazmine Sullivan

== Discography ==
Singles

- "Dance The Night Away" (2018)
- "Confession" (2019)

Disgusted Song House · 2023

Feeling Good The Complete Season 11 Collection (The Voice Performance) · 2016

The Standard The Standard · 2024 Good For? Frantic · 2023 To the Moon Frantic · 2023 Flowers Frantic · 2023

175 Lbs 175 Lbs · 2023 White Chocolate White Chocolate · 2021

Give Good Burger Back Good Burger 2 (Original Motion Picture Soundtrack) · 2023 Take Me to Church The Complete Season 11 Collection (The Voice Performance) · 2016

No More Drama The Complete Season 11 Collection (The Voice Performance) · 2016

Villain Outta Me Frantic · 2023

Maybe The Complete Season 11 Collection (The Voice Performance) · 2016

Won't Take Me Alive Won't Take Me Alive · 2023 Love Overtime Love Overtime · 2019 Broken Wings Broken Wings · 2019 Feel Good Good Burger 2 (Original Motion Picture Soundtrack) · 2023

If I Didn't Love You If I Didn't Love You · 2019

Don’t Rain On My Parade The Complete Season 11 Collection (The Voice Performance) · 2016

MR. MONTGOMERY MR. MONTGOMERY · 2022 Love on the Brain The Complete Season 11 Collection (The Voice Performance) · 2016

Wishes The Complete Season 11 Collection (The Voice Performance) · 2016

To Sir With Love To Sir With Love · 2020

Scars to Your Beautiful The Complete Season 11 Collection (The Voice Performance) · 2016

Ave Maria The Complete Season 11 Collection (The Voice Performance) · 2016

God Bless The Child The Complete Season 11 Collection (The Voice Performance) · 2016 'Zat You, Santa Claus? Trois Dame Christmas · 2019

Home The Complete Season 11 Collection (The Voice Performance) · 2016 When Christmas Comes to Town Trois Dame Christmas · 2019 This Christmas Trois Dame Christmas · 2019

Hardwood Hardwood · 2024

Head Up High Head Up High · 2018

== Reception ==
Dance The Night Away debuted on the Billboard Dance Club Songs chart at #50 on July 7, 2018, and reached its peak at #33 on July 28, 2018. As of September 1, 2018, it was #28 on the Starfleet Music Dance Songs chart. Ani's second single "Confession" was released in the summer of 2019 and debuted at #40 on the Billboard Dance Club Songs chart and peaked at #14 on September 28 where it stayed for two weeks. This is her highest Billboard charting song to date. This information is about a completely different singer named Ani, not We Ani.
