= The Voice (American TV series) season 11 =

The Voice
- Season 11
- Promotional poster featuring Levine, Shelton, Cyrus, and Keys
- Hosted by: Carson Daly
- Coaches: Adam Levine; Miley Cyrus; Alicia Keys; Blake Shelton
- No. of contestants: 48 artists
- Winner: Sundance Head
- Winning coach: Blake Shelton
- Runner-up: Billy Gilman
- No. of episodes: 26

Release
- Original network: NBC
- Original release: September 19 – December 13, 2016

Season chronology
- ← Previous; Season 10 Next → Season 12

The eleventh season of the American reality talent show The Voice premiered on September 19, 2016, on NBC. A 30-minute preview episode aired following NBC's broadcast of the closing ceremony of the 2016 Summer Olympics on August 21, 2016. Adam Levine and Blake Shelton both returned for their eleventh season as coaches. Alicia Keys and Miley Cyrus joined the panel replacing Pharrell Williams and Christina Aguilera making it the first season with two female coaches. Carson Daly returned as the show's host.

Sundance Head was named the winner of the season, marking Blake Shelton's record-extending fifth win as a coach.

== Coaches and hosts ==
Coaches and Host of The Voice Season 11

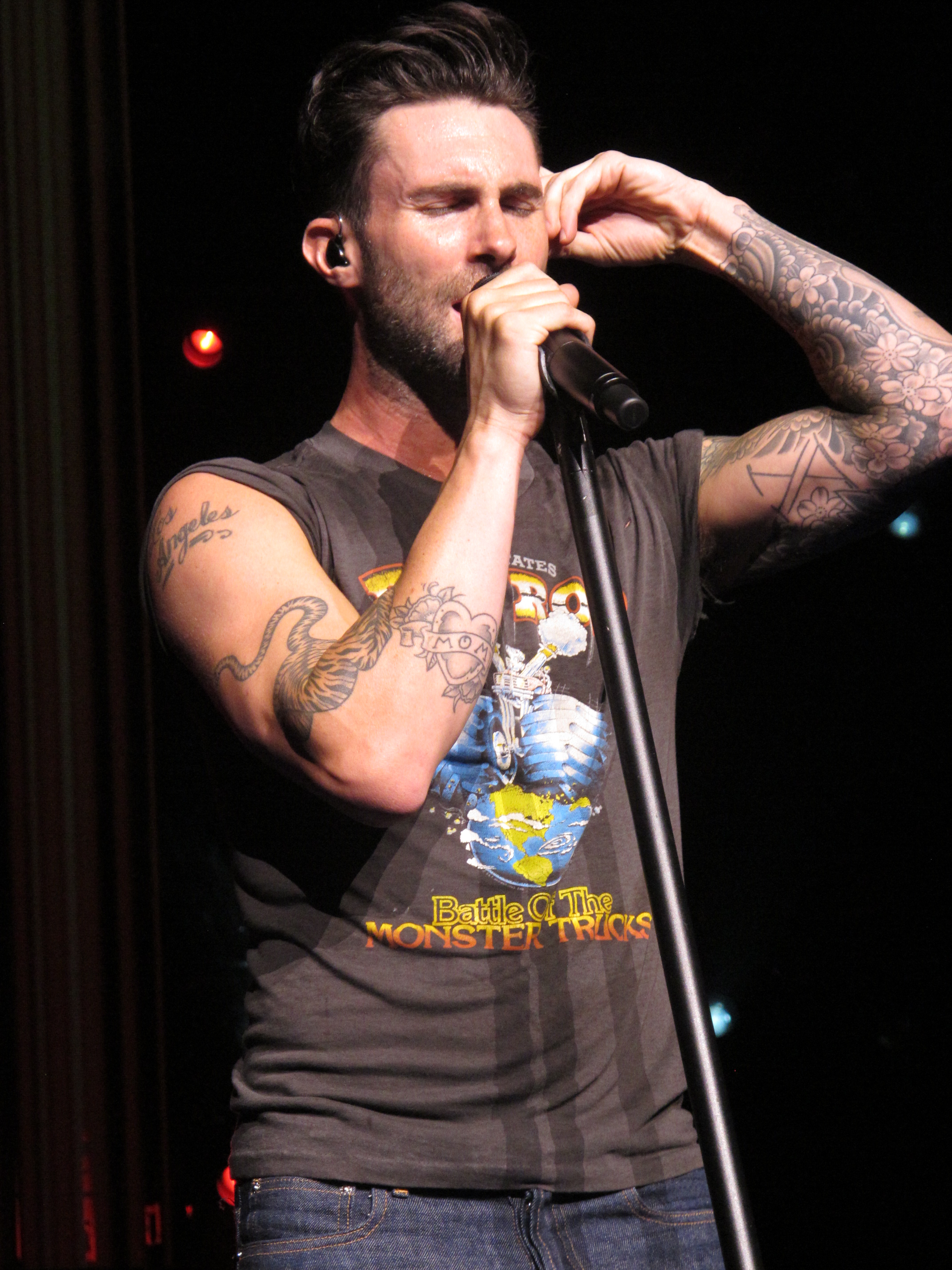
Adam Levine

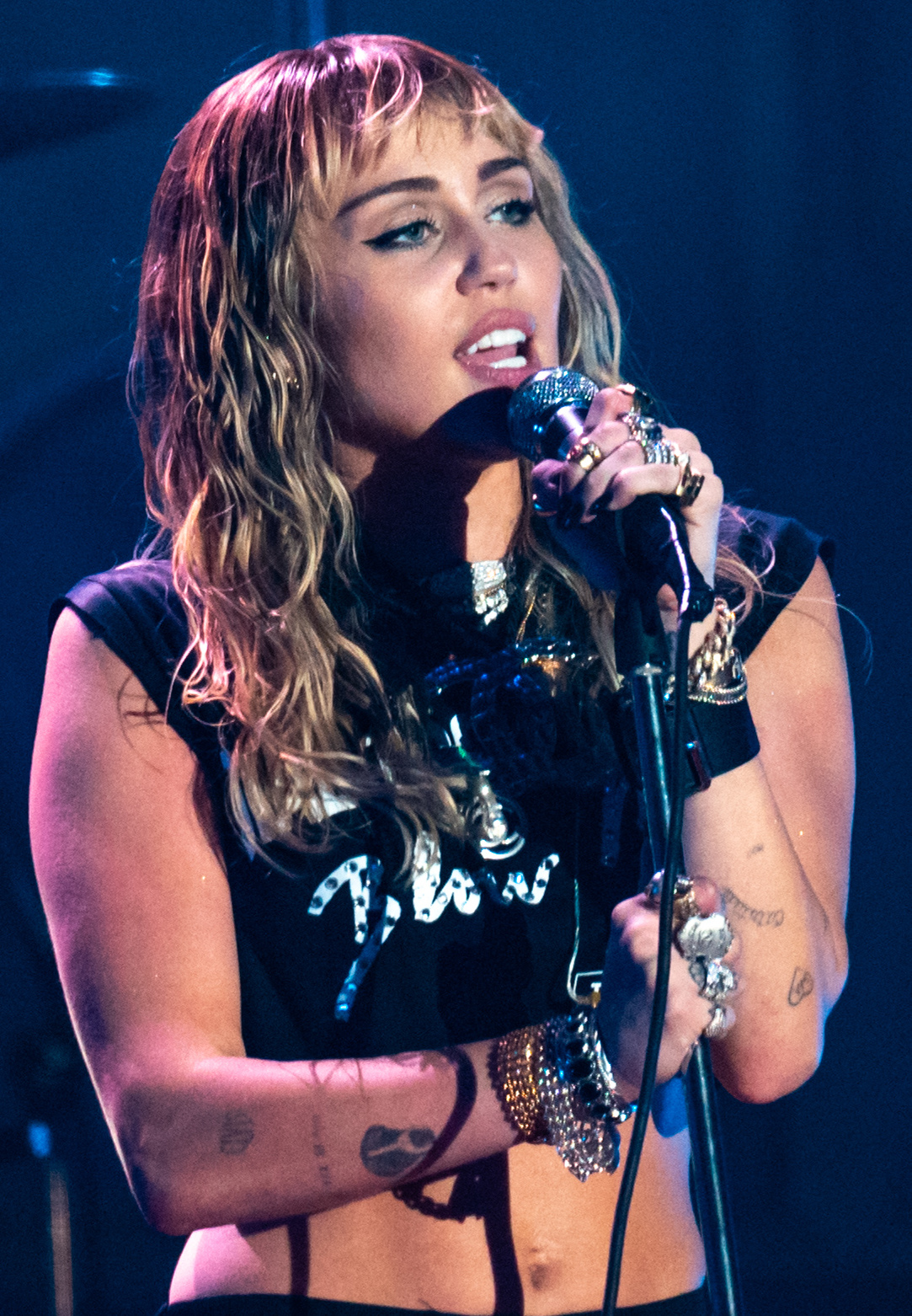
Miley Cyrus

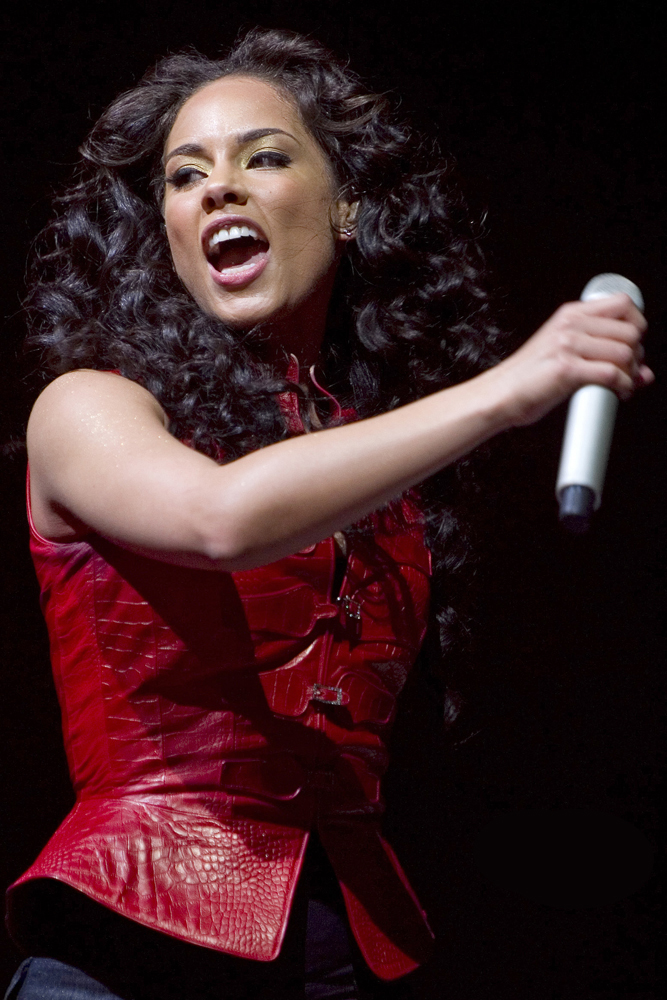
Alicia Keys

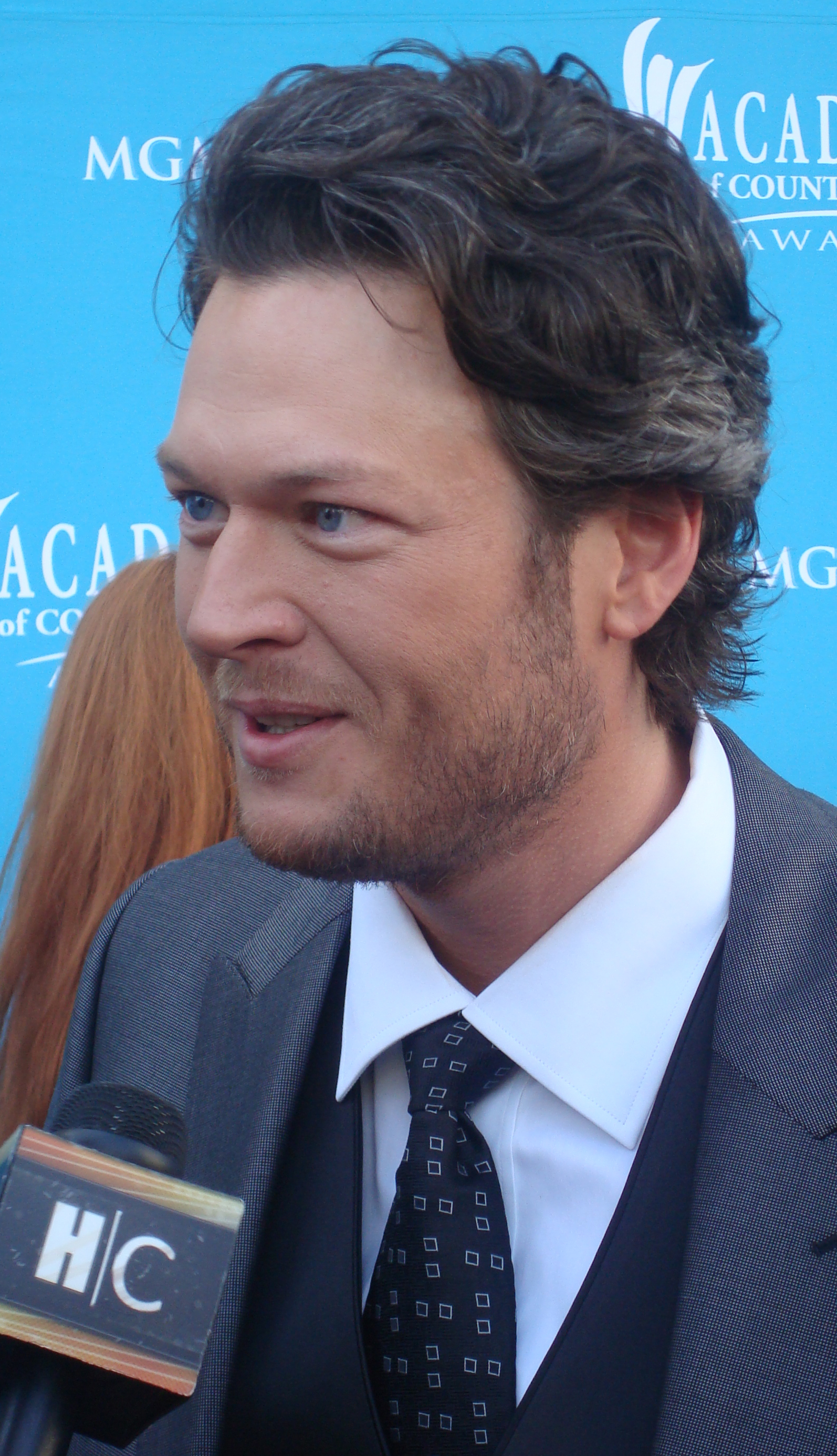
Blake Shelton

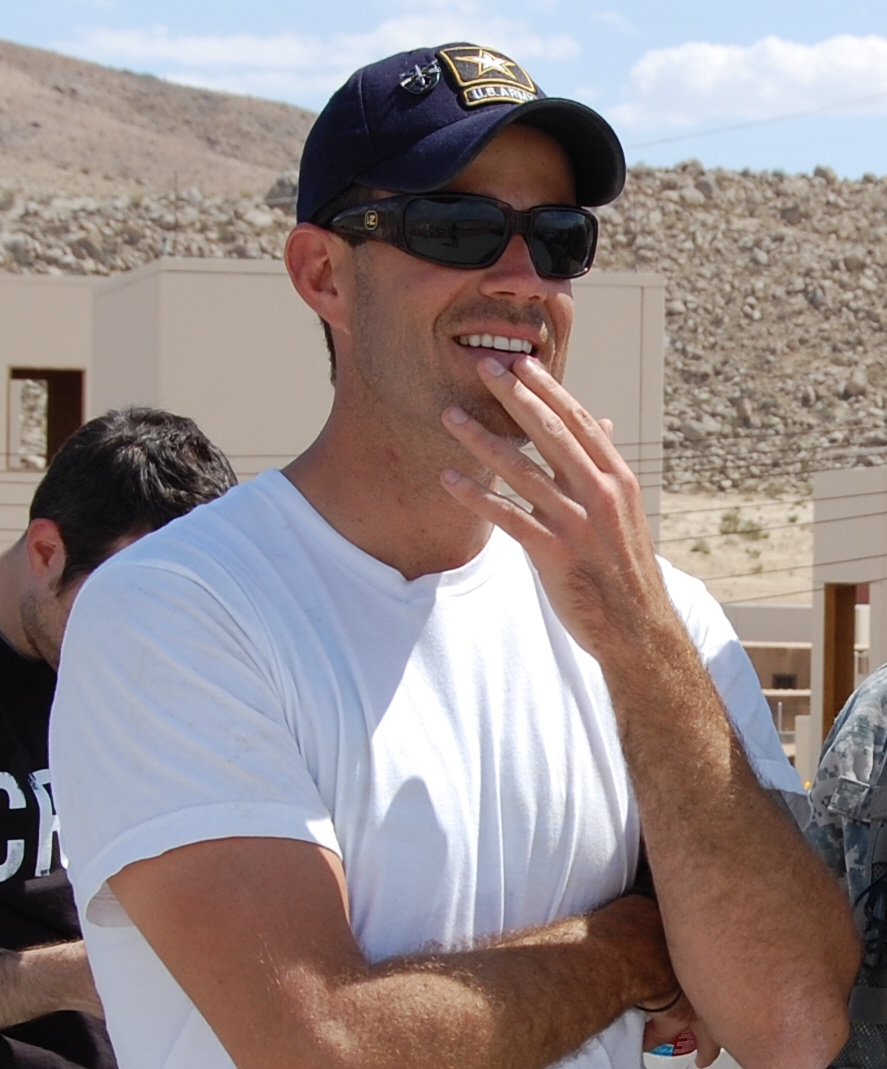
Carson Daly

There were two changes to the coaching panel from season ten. Coaches Adam Levine and Blake Shelton are joined by Alicia Keys and Miley Cyrus, who respectively replaced Pharrell Williams and Christina Aguilera, thus making it the first season to have two female coaches. Carson Daly returned for his 11th season as host. This is Alicia Keys's second appearance on the show after being the advisor for Team Pharrell in the Battle rehearsals in season 7. This is also Miley Cyrus's second appearance on the show after being the key advisor for the Knockout rehearsals in season 10, making her the youngest ever coach in any of the national versions of The Voice franchise worldwide at that time at the age of 23 (until coach Tini Stoessel of La Voz... Argentina in 2018, aged 21).

The mentors for the Battle Rounds this season were: Sammy Hagar for Team Adam, Bette Midler for Team Blake, Charlie Puth for Team Alicia, and Joan Jett for Team Miley. Tim McGraw and Faith Hill served as key advisors for all four teams.

== Teams ==
Color key

- Winner
- Runner-up
- Third place
- Fourth place
- Eliminated in the Live Shows
- Eliminated in Live Playoffs
- Stolen in the Knockout rounds
- Eliminated in the Knockout rounds
- Stolen in the Battle rounds
- Eliminated in the Battle rounds

Coaches	Top 48 artists				
Adam Levine					
Adam Levine	Billy Gilman	Josh Gallagher	Brendan Fletcher	Riley Elmore	Simone Gundy
Adam Levine	~~Jason Warrior~~	Dave Moisan	Nolan Neal	Ponciano Seoane	~~Bindi Liebowitz~~
Adam Levine	Natasha Bure	Andrew DeMuro	Elia Esparza	JSOUL	Johnny Rez
Miley Cyrus					
Miley Cyrus	Ali Caldwell	Aaron Gibson	Darby Walker	Belle Jewel	Sophia Urista
Miley Cyrus	~~Josh Halverson~~	Josette Diaz	Lauren Diaz	Maye Thomas	~~Sa'Rayah~~
Miley Cyrus	~~Karlee Metzger~~	~~Courtnie Ramirez~~	Charity Bowden	Khaliya Kimberlie	Lane Mack
Alicia Keys					
Alicia Keys	Wé McDonald	Christian Cuevas	Sa'Rayah	Josh Halverson	Kylie Rothfield
Alicia Keys	~~Belle Jewel~~	Courtnie Ramirez	Michael Sanchez	Whitney & Shannon	~~Josh Halverson~~
Alicia Keys	~~Dave Moisan~~	~~Lauren Diaz~~	~~Jason Warrior~~	Halle Tomlinson	Gabriel Violett
Blake Shelton					
Blake Shelton	Sundance Head	Austin Allsup	Courtney Harrell	Dana Harper	Jason Warrior
Blake Shelton	~~Josh Gallagher~~	Gabe Broussard	Bindi Liebowitz	Karlee Metzger	Christian Fermin
Blake Shelton	Preston James	Tarra Layne	Blaine Long	Dan Shafer	Ethan Tucker
Note: Italicized names are stolen artists (names struck through within former teams).

== Blind auditions ==
Color key

✔	Coach pressed "I WANT YOU" button
	Artist defaulted to this coach's team
	Artist selected to join this coach's team
	Artist eliminated with no coach pressing "I WANT YOU" button

=== Episode 1 (Sept. 19) ===
The coaches performed "Dream On" at the start of the show, as a tribute to former contestant Christina Grimmie who was killed on June 10, 2016, after the finals of the previous season.

Order	Artist	Age	Hometown	Song	Coach's and artist's choices			
Order	Artist	Age	Hometown	Song	Adam	Miley	Alicia	Blake
1	Jason Warrior	21	Chicago, Illinois	"Living for the City"	✔	—	✔	—
2	Dave Moisan	33	Louisville, Kentucky	"Sex and Candy"	✔	✔	✔	✔
3	Courtnie Ramirez	17	Bryan, Texas	"Mamma Knows Best"	—	✔	✔	—
4	Sundance Head	37	Porter, Texas	"I've Been Loving You Too Long"	✔	—	—	✔
5	Maggie Renfroe	16	Macon, Georgia	"Lost Boy"	—	—	—	—
6	Ali Caldwell	28	Brooklyn, New York	"Dangerous Woman"	✔	✔	✔	✔
7	Riley Elmore	16	West Dundee, Illinois	"The Way You Look Tonight" (Note: Elmore and Levine later performed a duet of the same song after Elmore's blind audition.)	✔	—	—	✔
8	Dana Harper	25	Dallas, Texas	"Jealous"	✔	—	✔	✔
9	Gabe Broussard	15	Lafayette, Louisiana	"Lonely Night In Georgia"	—	✔	—	✔
10	Chris Cron	34	Orange County, California	"Never Tear Us Apart"	—	—	—	—
11	Christian Cuevas	20	Orlando, Florida	"How Am I Supposed to Live Without You"	✔	—	✔	✔

=== Episode 2 (Sept. 20) ===
Order	Artist	Age	Hometown	Song	Coach's and artist's choices			
Order	Artist	Age	Hometown	Song	Adam	Miley	Alicia	Blake
1	Sa'Rayah (Tytiana Nelson)	28	Chicago, Illinois	"Drown in My Own Tears"	—	✔	✔	—
2	Ethan Tucker	26	Olympia, Washington	"Roxanne"	✔	—	—	✔
3	Katie Colosimo	22	Nashville, Tennessee	"Stone Cold"	—	—	—	—
4	Wé McDonald	17	Paterson, New Jersey	"Feeling Good"	✔	✔	✔	✔
5	Andrew DeMuro	25	Chicago, Illinois	"Vienna"	✔	—	—	✔
6	Billy Gilman	28	Richmond, Rhode Island	"When We Were Young"	✔	✔	✔	✔
7	Nathalie Vincent	18	Bridgeport, Connecticut	"Hold Back the River"	—	—	—	—
8	Sophia Urista	31	New York, New York	"Come Together"	—	✔	✔	—
9	Brendan Fletcher	26	Brooklyn, New York	"Jolene"	✔	✔	✔	—
10	Dan Shafer	56	Mount Juliet, Tennessee	"Marry Me"	—	—	—	✔
11	Lauren Diaz	24	Apple Valley, California	"If I Ain't Got You"	—	✔	✔	✔

=== Episode 3 (Sept. 26) ===
Order	Artist	Age	Hometown	Song	Coach's and artist's choices			
Order	Artist	Age	Hometown	Song	Adam	Miley	Alicia	Blake
1	Bindi Liebowitz	23	Plainfield, New Jersey	"Bust Your Windows"	✔	—	—	✔
2	Zack Hicks	24	Hope, Arkansas	"At This Moment"	—	—	—	—
3	Elia Esparza	23	El Paso, Texas	"Como La Flor"	✔	✔	—	✔
4	Lane Mack	30	Lafayette, Louisiana	"Every Day I Have the Blues"	—	✔	—	—
5	Karlee Metzger	22	Marquette, Michigan	"Samson"	—	✔	—	✔
6	Josh Halverson	31	Denton, Texas	"Forever Young"	—	✔	✔	✔

=== Episode 4 (Sept. 27) ===
Order	Artist	Age	Hometown	Song	Coach's and artist's choices			
Order	Artist	Age	Hometown	Song	Adam	Miley	Alicia	Blake
1	Aaron Gibson	25	Atlanta, Georgia	"Losing My Religion"	—	✔	✔	✔
2	Simone Gundy	26	Arlington, Texas	"I (Who Have Nothing)"	✔	✔	—	—
3	Samantha Landrum	22	Laurel, Mississippi	"Man! I Feel Like a Woman!"	—	—	—	—
4	Josh Gallagher	25	Cresson, Pennsylvania	"Stay a Little Longer"	—	—	✔	✔
5	Gabriel Violett	28	New York, New York	"Treat You Better"	—	—	✔	✔
6	Michael Sanchez	25	San Diego, California	"Use Me"	—	—	✔	—
7	Darby Walker	17	Burbank, California	"Stand by Me"	—	✔ (Note: Walker and Cyrus first performed a duet of the song "Jolene." Afterwards, she and Keys performed a duet of the song "No One.")	✔	✔
8	Austin Allsup	32	Fort Worth, Texas	"Wild Horses"	—	—	—	✔
9	Christian Fermin	20	Buena Park, California	"Brother"	—	—	—	✔
10	Preston James	16	Cheatham, Tennessee	"Nobody to Blame"	—	—	—	✔
11	Khaliya Kimberlie	16	Mescalero, New Mexico	"Dibs"	—	✔	—	✔
12	Cooper Van Bascom	22	Winston-Salem, North Carolina	"I'm Gonna Be (500 Miles)"	—	—	—	—
13	Halle Tomlinson	18	Boulder, Colorado	"New York State of Mind"	✔	—	✔	—
14	Nolan Neal	35	Nashville, Tennessee	"Tiny Dancer"	✔	✔	✔	✔

=== Episode 5 (Oct. 3) ===
Order	Artist	Age	Hometown	Song	Coach's and artist's choices			
Order	Artist	Age	Hometown	Song	Adam	Miley	Alicia	Blake
1	Whitney & Shannon (Whitney Sim and Shannon Bates)	25/23	Austin, Texas	"Landslide"	✔	✔	✔	✔
2	Johnny Rez	25	Miami, Florida	"Iris"	✔	—	—	✔
3	Maye Thomas	27	Broken Arrow, Oklahoma	"Roses"	✔	✔	—	—
4	Johnny Hayes	28	Mobile, Alabama	"Traveller"	—	—	—	—
5	Courtney Harrell	36	Los Angeles, California	"Let It Go"	—	—	✔	✔
6	Tarra Layne	30	Pittsburgh, Pennsylvania	"Black Velvet"	—	—	—	✔
7	Charity Bowden	17	Hope Hull, Alabama	"Girl Crush"	—	✔	✔	—
8	JSoul (Jonathan Guilfoyle)	26	Virginia Beach, Virginia	"Stay With Me"	✔	—	—	—
9	Belle Jewel	18	Brooklyn, New York	"Don't You (Forget About Me)"	—	—	✔	—
10	Kylie Rothfield	23	Danville, California	"Wherever I Go"	—	—	✔	✔
11	Natasha Bure	17	Los Angeles, California	"Can't Help Falling in Love"	✔	—	Team full	—
12	Blaine Long	40	Chandler, Arizona	"Have a Little Faith in Me"	✔	✔	Team full	✔
13	Nicholas Ray	32	Chicago, Illinois	"I've Got the Music in Me"	—	—	Team full	Team full
14	Ponciano Seoane	25	San Antonio, Texas	"Home"	✔	✔	Team full	Team full
15	Stori	28	Newark, New Jersey	"Killing Me Softly With His Song"	Team full	—	Team full	Team full
16	James Paek	30	Buena Park, California	"If It Hadn't Been For Love"	Team full	—	Team full	Team full
17	Sophia Joelle	16	Zionsville, Indiana	"Elastic Heart"	Team full	—	Team full	Team full
18	Josette Diaz	17	Cresskill, New Jersey	"Love Yourself"	Team full	✔	Team full	Team full

=== Episode 6 (Oct. 4) ===
This episode covered the Best of the Blind Auditions and a sneak peek of the next stage of competition, the Battle Rounds.

== The Battles ==
The Battles round started with episode 7 and ended with episode 10 (broadcast on October 10, 11, 17, 18, 2016). Season eleven's advisors include: Sammy Hagar for Team Adam, Joan Jett for Team Miley, Charlie Puth for Team Alicia, and Bette Midler for Team Blake. As like previous seasons, each coaches can steal two losing artists from another coach.

Color Key:

Artist won the Battle and advanced to the Knockouts
Artist lost the Battle but was stolen by another coach and advanced to the Knockouts
Artist lost the Battle and was eliminated

Episode	Coach	Order	Winner	Song	Loser	'Steal' result			
Episode	Coach	Order	Winner	Song	Loser	Adam	Miley	Alicia	Blake
Episode 7 (Monday, Oct 10, 2016)	Alicia Keys	1	Christian Cuevas	"Hello"	Jason Warrior	✔	—	—N/a	—
Episode 7 (Monday, Oct 10, 2016)	Adam Levine	2	Riley Elmore	"Cry Me a River"	Natasha Bure	—N/a	—	—	—
Episode 7 (Monday, Oct 10, 2016)	Miley Cyrus	3	Ali Caldwell	"Hit or Miss"	Courtnie Ramirez	—	—N/a	✔	✔
Episode 7 (Monday, Oct 10, 2016)	Blake Shelton	4	Sundance Head	"Feel Like Makin' Love"	Dan Shafer	—	—	—	—N/a
Episode 7 (Monday, Oct 10, 2016)	Adam Levine	5	Billy Gilman	"Man in the Mirror"	Andrew DeMuro	—N/a	—	—	—
Episode 7 (Monday, Oct 10, 2016)	Alicia Keys	6	Wé McDonald	"Maybe"	Lauren Diaz	✔	✔	—N/a	—
Episode 8 (Tuesday, Oct 11, 2016)	Miley Cyrus	1	Sophia Urista	"Money"	Lane Mack	—	—N/a	—	—
Episode 8 (Tuesday, Oct 11, 2016)	Blake Shelton	2	Courtney Harrell	"Gravity"	Ethan Tucker	—	—	—	—N/a
Episode 8 (Tuesday, Oct 11, 2016)	Adam Levine	3	Ponciano Seoane	"Tenerife Sea"	Elia Esparza	—N/a	—	—	—
Episode 8 (Tuesday, Oct 11, 2016)	Miley Cyrus	4	Josette Diaz	"She's Got You"	Charity Bowden	—	—N/a	—	—
Episode 8 (Tuesday, Oct 11, 2016)	Miley Cyrus	5	Maye Thomas	"For What It's Worth"	Khaliya Kimberlie	—	—N/a	—	—
Episode 8 (Tuesday, Oct 11, 2016)	Alicia Keys	6	Michael Sanchez	"Valerie"	Dave Moisan	✔	—	—N/a	—
Episode 9 (Monday, Oct 17, 2016)	Adam Levine	1	Nolan Neal	"Sledgehammer"	Johnny Rez	Team full	—	—	—
Episode 9 (Monday, Oct 17, 2016)	Miley Cyrus	2	Darby Walker	"Brand New Key"	Karlee Metzger	Team full	—N/a	—	✔
Episode 9 (Monday, Oct 17, 2016)	Blake Shelton	3	Josh Gallagher	"Stranger in My House"	Blaine Long	Team full	—	—	—N/a
Episode 9 (Monday, Oct 17, 2016)	Blake Shelton	4	Dana Harper	"Alive"	Tarra Layne	Team full	—	—	—N/a
Episode 9 (Monday, Oct 17, 2016)	Alicia Keys	5	Belle Jewel	"Bennie and the Jets"	Halle Tomlinson	Team full	—	—N/a	—
Episode 9 (Monday, Oct 17, 2016)	Adam Levine	6	Simone Gundy	"You're All I Need to Get By"	JSoul	Team full	—	—	—
Episode 9 (Monday, Oct 17, 2016)	Alicia Keys	7	Kylie Rothfield	"The House of the Rising Sun"	Josh Halverson	Team full	✔	—N/a	—
Episode 9 (Monday, Oct 17, 2016)	Blake Shelton	8	Gabe Broussard	"The Reason"	Christian Fermin	Team full	Team full	—	—N/a
Episode 9 (Monday, Oct 17, 2016)	Miley Cyrus	9	Aaron Gibson	"I'll Take Care of You"	Sa'Rayah	Team full	Team full	✔	✔
Episode 10 (Tuesday, Oct 18, 2016)	Blake Shelton	1	Austin Allsup	"Bad Moon Rising"	Preston James	Team full	Team full	Team full	—N/a
Episode 10 (Tuesday, Oct 18, 2016)	Alicia Keys	2	Whitney & Shannon	"More Than Words"	Gabriel Violett	Team full	Team full	Team full	—
Episode 10 (Tuesday, Oct 18, 2016)	Adam Levine	3	Brendan Fletcher	"Home"	Bindi Liebowitz	Team full	Team full	Team full	✔

== The Knockouts ==
For the Knockouts, Tim McGraw and Faith Hill were assigned as partner husband-and-wife duo mentors together for contestants in all four teams. Like previous Knockouts, each coaches can each steal one losing artist. The top 20 artists will then move on to the "Live Shows".

Color Key:

Artist won the Knockout and advanced to the Live Playoffs
Artist lost the Knockout but was stolen by another coach and advanced to the Live Playoffs
Artist lost the Knockout and was eliminated

Episode	Coach	Order	Song	Artists		Song	'Steal' result			
Episode	Coach	Order	Song	Winner	Loser	Song	Adam	Miley	Alicia	Blake
Episode 11 (Monday, Oct 24, 2016)	Blake Shelton	1	"The Climb"	Sundance Head	Josh Gallagher	"My Maria"	✔	—	—	—N/a
Episode 11 (Monday, Oct 24, 2016)	Alicia Keys	2	"Hound Dog"	Kylie Rothfield	Whitney & Shannon	"I Won't Give Up"	Team full	—	—N/a	—
Episode 11 (Monday, Oct 24, 2016)	Miley Cyrus	3	"No Ordinary Love"	Ali Caldwell	Lauren Diaz	"Rise Up"	Team full	—N/a	—	—
Episode 11 (Monday, Oct 24, 2016)	Adam Levine	4	"Midnight Train to Georgia"	Simone Gundy	Dave Moisan	"Like I Can"	Team full	—	—	—
Episode 11 (Monday, Oct 24, 2016)	Alicia Keys	5	"No More Drama"	Wé McDonald	Courtnie Ramirez	"If I Were a Boy"	Team full	—	—N/a	—
Episode 11 (Monday, Oct 24, 2016)	Adam Levine	6	"Haven't Met You Yet"	Riley Elmore	Jason Warrior	"I Want You"	Team full	—	—	✔
Episode 12 (Tuesday, Oct 25, 2016)	Blake Shelton	1	"River Deep – Mountain High"	Courtney Harrell	Bindi Liebowitz	"Son of a Preacher Man"	Team full	—	—	Team full
Episode 12 (Tuesday, Oct 25, 2016)	Adam Levine	2	"Fight Song"	Billy Gilman	Ponciano Seoane	"I See Fire"	Team full	—	—	Team full
Episode 12 (Tuesday, Oct 25, 2016)	Alicia Keys	3	"Superstar"	Christian Cuevas	Belle Jewel	"Don't Dream It's Over"	Team full	✔	—N/a	Team full
Episode 13 (Monday, Oct 31, 2016) (Halloween)	Blake Shelton	1	"Breakdown"	Austin Allsup	Gabe Broussard	"It Will Rain"	Team full	Team full	—	Team full
Episode 13 (Monday, Oct 31, 2016) (Halloween)	Miley Cyrus	2	"Shake It Out"	Darby Walker	Maye Thomas	"Closer"	Team full	Team full	—	Team full
Episode 13 (Monday, Oct 31, 2016) (Halloween)	Adam Levine	3	"Soulshine"	Brendan Fletcher	Nolan Neal	"Love is Your Name"	Team full	Team full	—	Team full
Episode 13 (Monday, Oct 31, 2016) (Halloween)	Alicia Keys	4	"Ain't Nobody"	Sa'Rayah	Michael Sanchez	"Just the Two of Us"	Team full	Team full	—N/a	Team full
Episode 13 (Monday, Oct 31, 2016) (Halloween)	Blake Shelton	5	"You Give Me Something"	Dana Harper	Karlee Metzger	"Invincible"	Team full	Team full	—	Team full
Episode 13 (Monday, Oct 31, 2016) (Halloween)	Miley Cyrus	6	"I Can't Stand the Rain"	Sophia Urista	Josette Diaz	"Eternal Flame"	Team full	Team full	—	Team full
Episode 13 (Monday, Oct 31, 2016) (Halloween)	Miley Cyrus	7	"Die a Happy Man"	Aaron Gibson	Josh Halverson	"Whiskey and You"	Team full	Team full	✔	Team full
Episode 14 (Tuesday, Nov 1, 2016)	The fourteenth episode was a special one-hour episode titled "The Road to the Live Shows." The episode showed the best moments of the season so far, including the blind auditions, the journey of the top 20 contestants and some unseen footage.									

== Live shows ==
Color Key:

Artist was saved by the Public's votes
Artist was saved by his/her coach or placed in the bottom two, bottom three, or middle three
Artist was saved by the Instant Save
Artist's iTunes vote multiplied by 5 (except The Finals) after his/her studio version of the song reached iTunes top 10
Artist was eliminated

=== Week 1: Live Playoffs (Nov. 7) ===
For the first time in The Voice history, playoff results were voted on in real-time, exclusively through Twitter and The Voice app. All 20 artists sang live and eight were eliminated by the end of the night. The Live Playoffs all aired in one episode due to coverage of the 2016 Presidential Election the next day.

With the eliminations of Josh Halverson and Kylie Rothfield, they pitted each other in the Battles.

Episode	Coach	Order	Artist	Song	Result
Episode 15 (Monday, Nov. 7, 2016)	Alicia Keys	1	Christian Cuevas	"Yesterday"	Public's vote
Episode 15 (Monday, Nov. 7, 2016)	Alicia Keys	2	Kylie Rothfield	"(I Can't Get No) Satisfaction"	Eliminated
Episode 15 (Monday, Nov. 7, 2016)	Alicia Keys	3	Wé McDonald	"Home"	Public's vote
Episode 15 (Monday, Nov. 7, 2016)	Alicia Keys	4	Josh Halverson	"Cupid"	Eliminated
Episode 15 (Monday, Nov. 7, 2016)	Alicia Keys	5	Sa'Rayah	"I'd Rather Go Blind"	Alicia's choice
Episode 15 (Monday, Nov. 7, 2016)	Blake Shelton	6	Dana Harper	"Maneater"	Eliminated
Episode 15 (Monday, Nov. 7, 2016)	Blake Shelton	7	Austin Allsup	"I Ain't Living Long Like This"	Public's vote
Episode 15 (Monday, Nov. 7, 2016)	Blake Shelton	8	Jason Warrior	"One Dance"	Eliminated
Episode 15 (Monday, Nov. 7, 2016)	Blake Shelton	9	Sundance Head	"Blue Ain't Your Color"	Public's vote
Episode 15 (Monday, Nov. 7, 2016)	Blake Shelton	10	Courtney Harrell	"It Must Have Been Love"	Blake's choice
Episode 15 (Monday, Nov. 7, 2016)	Miley Cyrus	11	Sophia Urista	"Da Ya Think I'm Sexy?"	Eliminated
Episode 15 (Monday, Nov. 7, 2016)	Miley Cyrus	12	Darby Walker	"Those Were the Days"	Miley's choice
Episode 15 (Monday, Nov. 7, 2016)	Miley Cyrus	13	Aaron Gibson	"Round Here"	Public's vote
Episode 15 (Monday, Nov. 7, 2016)	Miley Cyrus	14	Belle Jewel	"Runaway"	Eliminated
Episode 15 (Monday, Nov. 7, 2016)	Miley Cyrus	15	Ali Caldwell	"Times Have Changed"	Public's vote
Episode 15 (Monday, Nov. 7, 2016)	Adam Levine	16	Brendan Fletcher	"To Love Somebody"	Adam's choice
Episode 15 (Monday, Nov. 7, 2016)	Adam Levine	17	Simone Gundy	"Diamonds"	Eliminated
Episode 15 (Monday, Nov. 7, 2016)	Adam Levine	18	Josh Gallagher	"Colder Weather"	Public's vote
Episode 15 (Monday, Nov. 7, 2016)	Adam Levine	19	Riley Elmore	"Luck Be a Lady"	Eliminated
Episode 15 (Monday, Nov. 7, 2016)	Adam Levine	20	Billy Gilman	"Crying"	Public's vote

=== Week 2: Top 12 (Nov. 14 & 15) ===
The Top 12 performed on Monday, November 14, 2016, with the results following on Tuesday, November 15, 2016. For the live shows this week, Garth Brooks was assigned as a mentor for final 12 contestants in all four teams. For this week, the bottom two artists compete for the Instant Save and one artist was eliminated. None of the artists reached the top 10 on iTunes, so no bonuses were awarded.

Episode	Coach	Order	Artist	Song	Result
Episode 16 (Monday, Nov. 14, 2016)	Blake Shelton	1	Sundance Head	"My Church"	Public's vote
Episode 16 (Monday, Nov. 14, 2016)	Miley Cyrus	2	Darby Walker	"Ruby Tuesday"	Public's vote
Episode 16 (Monday, Nov. 14, 2016)	Alicia Keys	3	Christian Cuevas	"The Scientist"	Public's vote
Episode 16 (Monday, Nov. 14, 2016)	Alicia Keys	4	Sa'Rayah	"Livin' on a Prayer"	Bottom two
Episode 16 (Monday, Nov. 14, 2016)	Adam Levine	5	Billy Gilman	"The Show Must Go On"	Public's vote
Episode 16 (Monday, Nov. 14, 2016)	Blake Shelton	6	Austin Allsup	"Do Right Woman, Do Right Man"	Public's vote
Episode 16 (Monday, Nov. 14, 2016)	Alicia Keys	7	Wé McDonald	"Take Me to Church"	Public's vote
Episode 16 (Monday, Nov. 14, 2016)	Miley Cyrus	8	Aaron Gibson	"Hollywood Forever Cemetery Sings"	Bottom two
Episode 16 (Monday, Nov. 14, 2016)	Blake Shelton	9	Courtney Harrell	"I Don't Want to Miss a Thing"	Public's vote
Episode 16 (Monday, Nov. 14, 2016)	Adam Levine	10	Josh Gallagher	"Why"	Public's vote
Episode 16 (Monday, Nov. 14, 2016)	Miley Cyrus	11	Ali Caldwell	"Did I Ever Love You"	Public's vote
Episode 16 (Monday, Nov. 14, 2016)	Adam Levine	12	Brendan Fletcher	"Whipping Post"	Public's vote
Episode 17 (Tuesday, Nov. 15, 2016)
Episode 17 (Tuesday, Nov. 15, 2016)	Instant Save performances				
Episode 17 (Tuesday, Nov. 15, 2016)	Alicia Keys	1	Sa'Rayah	"Rock Steady"	Eliminated
Episode 17 (Tuesday, Nov. 15, 2016)	Miley Cyrus	2	Aaron Gibson	"Lego House"	Instant Save

Non-competition performances
Order	Performer	Song
17.1	Adam Levine and his team (Brendan Fletcher, Josh Gallagher, and Billy Gilman)	"For What It's Worth"
17.2	Alicia Keys (with Adam Levine on Guitar)	"Blended Family (What You Do for Love)"/"Holy War"
17.3	Miley Cyrus and her team (Ali Caldwell, Aaron Gibson, and Darby Walker)	"There'll Always Be Music"

=== Week 3: Top 11 (Nov. 21 & 22) ===
The Top 11 performed on Monday, November 21, 2016, with the results following on Tuesday, November 22, 2016. iTunes bonus multiplier was awarded to Sundance Head (#9).

Episode	Coach	Order	Artist	Song	Result
Episode 18 (Monday, Nov. 21, 2016)	Miley Cyrus	1	Ali Caldwell	"9 to 5"	Public's vote
Episode 18 (Monday, Nov. 21, 2016)	Blake Shelton	2	Sundance Head	"No One"	Public's vote
Episode 18 (Monday, Nov. 21, 2016)	Miley Cyrus	3	Aaron Gibson	"Hurt"	Bottom two
Episode 18 (Monday, Nov. 21, 2016)	Blake Shelton	4	Courtney Harrell	"What I Did for Love"	Public's vote
Episode 18 (Monday, Nov. 21, 2016)	Adam Levine	5	Josh Gallagher	"Drunk on Your Love"	Public's vote
Episode 18 (Monday, Nov. 21, 2016)	Adam Levine	6	Billy Gilman	"All I Ask"	Public's vote
Episode 18 (Monday, Nov. 21, 2016)	Alicia Keys	7	Christian Cuevas	"Rosanna"	Public's vote
Episode 18 (Monday, Nov. 21, 2016)	Blake Shelton	8	Austin Allsup	"Turn the Page"	Public's vote
Episode 18 (Monday, Nov. 21, 2016)	Miley Cyrus	9	Darby Walker	"You Don't Own Me"	Bottom two
Episode 18 (Monday, Nov. 21, 2016)	Adam Levine	10	Brendan Fletcher	"The River"	Public's vote
Episode 18 (Monday, Nov. 21, 2016)	Alicia Keys	11	Wé McDonald	"Love on the Brain"	Public's vote
Episode 19 (Tuesday, Nov. 22. 2016)
Episode 19 (Tuesday, Nov. 22. 2016)	Instant Save performances				
Episode 19 (Tuesday, Nov. 22. 2016)	Miley Cyrus	1	Darby Walker	"Your Song"	Eliminated
Episode 19 (Tuesday, Nov. 22. 2016)	Miley Cyrus	2	Aaron Gibson	"Budapest"	Instant Save

Non-competition performances
Order	Performer	Song
19.1	Blake Shelton and his team (Austin Allsup, Courtney Harrell and Sundance Head)	"The Heart of Rock & Roll"
19.2	Alicia Keys and her team (Christian Cuevas and Wé McDonald)	"People Get Ready"
19.3	Jordan Smith	"O Holy Night"

=== Week 4: Top 10 (Nov. 28 & 29) ===
The Top 10 performed on Monday, November 28, 2016, with the results following on Tuesday, November 29, 2016. This week featured a double elimination and a bottom three Instant Save. iTunes bonus multipliers were awarded to Sundance Head (#1), Brendan Fletcher (#2), Billy Gilman (#4), Christian Cuevas (#6) and Wé McDonald (#9). For the first time since the inclusion of the Instant Save in season 5, a contestant was saved three consecutive weeks.

Episode	Coach	Order	Artist	Song	Result
Episode 20 (Monday, Nov. 28, 2016)	Adam Levine	1	Billy Gilman	"Anyway"	Public's vote
Episode 20 (Monday, Nov. 28, 2016)	Blake Shelton	2	Courtney Harrell	"If I Could Turn Back Time"	Bottom three
Episode 20 (Monday, Nov. 28, 2016)	Adam Levine	3	Josh Gallagher	"Real Good Man"	Public's vote
Episode 20 (Monday, Nov. 28, 2016)	Miley Cyrus	4	Aaron Gibson	"Rocket Man"	Bottom three
Episode 20 (Monday, Nov. 28, 2016)	Alicia Keys	5	Christian Cuevas	"Million Reasons"	Public's vote
Episode 20 (Monday, Nov. 28, 2016)	Blake Shelton	6	Austin Allsup	"Missing You"	Bottom three
Episode 20 (Monday, Nov. 28, 2016)	Alicia Keys	7	Wé McDonald	"God Bless the Child"	Public's vote
Episode 20 (Monday, Nov. 28, 2016)	Adam Levine	8	Brendan Fletcher	"True Colors"	Public's vote
Episode 20 (Monday, Nov. 28, 2016)	Blake Shelton	9	Sundance Head	"Me and Jesus"	Public's vote
Episode 20 (Monday, Nov. 28, 2016)	Miley Cyrus	10	Ali Caldwell	"Without You"	Public's vote
Episode 21 (Tuesday, Nov. 29, 2016)
Episode 21 (Tuesday, Nov. 29, 2016)	Instant Save performances				
Episode 21 (Tuesday, Nov. 29, 2016)	Blake Shelton	1	Austin Allsup	"Tennessee Whiskey"	Eliminated
Episode 21 (Tuesday, Nov. 29, 2016)	Blake Shelton	2	Courtney Harrell	"Bless the Broken Road"	Eliminated
Episode 21 (Tuesday, Nov. 29, 2016)	Miley Cyrus	3	Aaron Gibson	"Don't Think Twice, It's All Right"	Instant Save

Non-competition performances
Order	Performer	Song
20.1	Maroon 5	"Don't Wanna Know"
21.1	Dolly Parton, Jennifer Nettles, and the Top 10 finalists (Austin Allsup, Ali Caldwell, Christian Cuevas, Brendan Fletcher, Josh Gallagher, Aaron Gibson, Billy Gilman, Courtney Harrell, Sundance Head, Wé McDonald)	"Circle of Love"
21.2	Dolly Parton, Miley Cyrus, and Pentatonix	"Jolene"

=== Week 5: Semifinals (Dec. 5 & 6) ===
The Top eight performed on Monday, December 5, 2016, with the results following on Tuesday, December 6, 2016. This week, the three artists with the most votes made it straight to the finals, the two artists with the fewest votes were immediately eliminated and the middle three contended for the remaining spot in the finals via Instant Save. In addition to their individual songs, each artist performed a duet with another artist in the competition, though these duets were not available for purchase on iTunes. iTunes bonus multipliers were awarded to Gilman (#1), Head (#2), Josh Gallagher (#3) and Cuevas (#4).

With the eliminations of Ali Caldwell and Aaron Gibson, Miley Cyrus no longer has any artists remaining on her team. With the advancement of McDonald to the finale, Alicia Keys becomes the second new coach to successfully get an artist on her team to the finale on her first attempt as a coach, the first being Usher, who coached Michelle Chamuel all the way to the finale of the 4th season.

Episode	Coach	Order	Artist	Solo Song	Duet Song	Result
Episode 22 (Monday, Dec. 5, 2016)	Alicia Keys	1 (8)	Christian Cuevas	"To Worship You I Live (Away)"	"Unsteady"	Middle three
Episode 22 (Monday, Dec. 5, 2016)	Miley Cyrus	3 (10)	Ali Caldwell	"I Will Always Love You"	"It's Only Love"	Middle three
Episode 22 (Monday, Dec. 5, 2016)	Adam Levine	4 (10)	Brendan Fletcher	"Angel"	"It's Only Love"	Eliminated
Episode 22 (Monday, Dec. 5, 2016)	Alicia Keys	6 (2)	Wé McDonald	"Scars to Your Beautiful"	"FourFiveSeconds"	Public's vote
Episode 22 (Monday, Dec. 5, 2016)	Miley Cyrus	7 (2)	Aaron Gibson	"(Everything I Do) I Do It for You"	"FourFiveSeconds"	Eliminated
Episode 22 (Monday, Dec. 5, 2016)	Adam Levine	9 (5)	Josh Gallagher	"Danny's Song"	"Feelin' Alright?"	Middle three
Episode 22 (Monday, Dec. 5, 2016)	Blake Shelton	11 (5)	Sundance Head	"Love Can Build a Bridge"	"Feelin' Alright?"	Public's vote
Episode 22 (Monday, Dec. 5, 2016)	Adam Levine	12 (8)	Billy Gilman	"I Surrender"	"Unsteady"	Public's vote
Episode 23 (Tuesday, Dec. 6, 2016)
Episode 23 (Tuesday, Dec. 6, 2016)	Instant Save performances					
Episode 23 (Tuesday, Dec. 6, 2016)	Alicia Keys	1	Christian Cuevas	"I Can't Make You Love Me"		Eliminated
Episode 23 (Tuesday, Dec. 6, 2016)	Miley Cyrus	2	Ali Caldwell	"Sledgehammer"		Eliminated
Episode 23 (Tuesday, Dec. 6, 2016)	Adam Levine	3	Josh Gallagher	"I Drive Your Truck"		Instant Save

Non-competition performances
Order	Performer	Song
23.1	OneRepublic	"Let's Hurt Tonight"
23.2	Hannah Huston	"I Alone Have Loved You"
23.3	Blake Shelton	"A Guy with a Girl"

=== Week 6: Finale (Dec. 12 & 13) ===
The Top four performed on Monday, December 12, 2016, with the final results following on Tuesday, December 13, 2016. Finalists performed a solo cover song, a duet with their coach, and an original song. iTunes bonus multipliers were awarded to Head (#1, #2, and #7), Gilman (#3 and #4), Gallagher (#6), and McDonald (#10). All iTunes votes received for the five weeks leading up to the finale were cumulatively added to online and app finale votes for each finalist. This also marks the first that a pairing (during the Knockouts) stands until the finale (Josh G. and Sundance).

Coach	Artist	Order	Solo Song	Order	Duet Song (With coach)	Order	Original Song	Result
Adam Levine	Billy Gilman	1	"My Way"	5	"Bye Bye Love"	11	"Because of Me"	Runner-up
Adam Levine	Josh Gallagher	9	"Jack & Diane"	7	"Smooth"	2	"Pick Any Small Town"	Fourth place
Alicia Keys	Wé McDonald	12	"Don't Rain on My Parade"	3	"Ave Maria"	6	"Wishes"	Third place
Blake Shelton	Sundance Head	10	"At Last"	8	"Treat Her Right"	4	"Darlin' Don't Go"	Winner

Non-competition performances
Order	Performer	Song
25.1	Stevie Wonder and Ariana Grande with The Voice Final 12	"Faith"
25.2	Josh Gallagher (with Austin Allsup and Brendan Fletcher)	"My Kinda Party"
25.3	John Legend and Wé McDonald	"Love Me Now"
25.4	Sting	"I Can't Stop Thinking About You"
25.5	Billy Gilman (with Christian Cuevas, Ali Caldwell, Courtney Harrell and Sa'Rayah)	"Proud Mary"
25.6	Cam and Josh Gallagher	"Burning House"
25.7	The Weeknd	"Starboy"
25.8	Kiss and Sundance Head	"Detroit Rock City" and "Rock and Roll All Nite"
25.9	Wé McDonald (with Aaron Gibson, Darby Walker and Brendan Fletcher)	"Love Lockdown"
25.10	Kelly Clarkson and Billy Gilman	"It's Quiet Uptown"
25.11	Sundance Head (with Courtney Harrell and Austin Allsup)	"Ain't Worth the Whiskey"
25.12	Bruno Mars	"24K Magic"
25.13	Sundance Head (winner)	"Darlin' Don't Go"

== Elimination chart ==
=== Overall ===
Color Key
Artist's info

- Team Adam
- Team Miley
- Team Alicia
- Team Blake

Result details

- Winner
- Runner-up
- Third place
- Fourth place
- Saved by Instant Save (via Twitter)
- Artist was saved by the public
- Artist was saved by his/her coach
- Artist was eliminated

Live show results per week
Artist	Week 1 Playoffs	Week 2	Week 3	Week 4	Week 5	Week 6 Finale
Sundance Head	Safe	Safe	Safe	Safe	Safe	Winner
Billy Gilman	Safe	Safe	Safe	Safe	Safe	Runner-up
Wé McDonald	Safe	Safe	Safe	Safe	Safe	3rd place
Josh Gallagher	Safe	Safe	Safe	Safe	Safe	4th place
Ali Caldwell	Safe	Safe	Safe	Safe	Eliminated	Eliminated (Week 5)
Christian Cuevas	Safe	Safe	Safe	Safe	Eliminated	Eliminated (Week 5)
Brendan Fletcher	Safe	Safe	Safe	Safe	Eliminated	Eliminated (Week 5)
Aaron Gibson	Safe	Safe	Safe	Safe	Eliminated	Eliminated (Week 5)
Austin Allsup	Safe	Safe	Safe	Eliminated	Eliminated (Week 4)	
Courtney Harrell	Safe	Safe	Safe	Eliminated	Eliminated (Week 4)	
Darby Walker	Safe	Safe	Eliminated	Eliminated (Week 3)		
Sa'Rayah	Safe	Eliminated	Eliminated (Week 2)			
Belle Jewel	Eliminated	Eliminated (Week 1)				
Dana Harper	Eliminated	Eliminated (Week 1)				
Jason Warrior	Eliminated	Eliminated (Week 1)				
Josh Halverson	Eliminated	Eliminated (Week 1)				
Kylie Rothfield	Eliminated	Eliminated (Week 1)				
Riley Elmore	Eliminated	Eliminated (Week 1)				
Simone Gundy	Eliminated	Eliminated (Week 1)				
Sophia Urista	Eliminated	Eliminated (Week 1)				

=== Team ===
Color Key
Artist's info

- Team Adam
- Team Miley
- Team Alicia
- Team Blake

Result details

- Winner
- Runner-up
- Third place
- Fourth Place
- Eliminated
- Artist Saved by Instant Save (via Twitter)
- Artist received one or more iTunes bonus that week
- Number of iTunes bonuses received
- Teams are in 3 artists
- No artists remaining on his/her team

Artist	Week 1 Playoffs	Week 2	Week 3	Week 4	Week 5	Week 6 Finale
Billy Gilman	Public's choice	Advanced	Advanced	Advanced	Advanced	Runner-up
Josh Gallagher	Public's choice	Advanced	Advanced	Advanced	Advanced	Fourth place
Brendan Fletcher	Coach's Choice	Advanced	Advanced	Advanced	Eliminated	
Riley Elmore	Eliminated					
Simone Gundy	Eliminated					
Ali Caldwell	Public's choice	Advanced	Advanced	Advanced	Eliminated	
Aaron Gibson	Public's choice	Advanced	Advanced	Advanced	Eliminated	
Darby Walker	Coach's Choice	Advanced	Eliminated			
Belle Jewel	Eliminated					
Sophia Urista	Eliminated					
Wé McDonald	Public's choice	Advanced	Advanced	Advanced	Advanced	Third place
Christian Cuevas	Public's choice	Advanced	Advanced	Advanced	Eliminated	
Sa'Rayah	Coach's Choice	Eliminated				
Josh Halverson	Eliminated					
Kylie Rothfield	Eliminated					
Sundance Head	Public's choice	Advanced	Advanced	Advanced	Advanced	Winner
Austin Allsup	Public's choice	Advanced	Advanced	Eliminated		
Courtney Harrell	Coach's Choice	Advanced	Advanced	Eliminated		
Dana Harper	Eliminated					
Jason Warrior	Eliminated					

Rank	Coach	Top 12	Top 11	Top 10	Top 8	Top 6	Top 4
1	Blake Shelton	3	3	3	1	1	1
2	Adam Levine	3	3	3	3	2	2
3	Alicia Keys	3	2	2	2	2	1
4	Miley Cyrus	3	3	2	2	1	0

== Artists who appeared on other shows or seasons ==
- Darby Walker appeared as herself in nine episodes of the television sitcom Girl Meets World.
- Sundance Head was on the sixth season of American Idol and was eliminated during Top 16 Week.
- Lauren Diaz appeared on the second season of America's Most Talented Kid.
- Nolan Neal auditioned for the tenth season of The Voice but did not score a chair turn. He later competed in the 15th season of America's Got Talent, and was eliminated in the quarterfinals.
- Elia Esparza later on auditioned for the sixth season of La Voz México joining Team Laura Pausini, and also appeared on the sixteenth season of American Idol and eliminated at the end of Hollywood Week.
- Preston James also auditioned on the sixteenth season of American Idol and got cut at Hollywood week.
- Jason Warrior later appeared on the first season of The Four: Battle For Stardom and was eliminated in Week 5 and made it to the Top 24 on the 19th season of American Idol.
- Ali Caldwell later appeared on the second season of The Four: Battle for Stardom and was eliminated in Week 7.
- Chris Cron had major success with his band Mêlée with the song "Built To Last" in the late-2000s.
- Kylie Rothfield would later appear on the second season of Songland.
- Natasha Bure is the daughter of the actress of Full House and Fuller House, Candace Cameron Bure.
- Wé McDonald appeared on the twenty-first season of American Idol and made the Top 5.

== Ratings ==
Episode		Original airdate	Production	Time slot (ET)	Viewers (in millions)	Adults (18–49)		Source
Episode		Original airdate	Production	Time slot (ET)	Viewers (in millions)	Rating	Share	Source
1	"The Blind Auditions Preview"	August 21, 2016	1101	Sunday 10:30 p.m.	10.34	2.7	10	
2	"The Blind Auditions Premiere, Part 1"	September 19, 2016	1102	Monday 8:00 p.m.	12.10	3.3	11	
3	"The Blind Auditions Premiere, Part 2"	September 20, 2016	1103	Tuesday 8:00 p.m.	12.29	3.4	12	
4	"The Blind Auditions, Part 3"	September 26, 2016	1104	Monday 8:00 p.m.	11.72	3.2	10	
5	"The Blind Auditions, Part 4"	September 27, 2016	1105	Tuesday 8:00 p.m.	12.09	3.3	11	
6	"The Blind Auditions, Part 5"	October 3, 2016	1106	Monday 8:00 p.m.	11.78	3.0	10	
7	"The Best of the Blind Auditions"	October 4, 2016	1107	Tuesday 8:00 p.m.	7.93	2.0	8	
8	"The Battles Premiere, Part 1"	October 10, 2016	1108	Monday 8:00 p.m.	11.37	2.9	9	
9	"The Battles Premiere, Part 2"	October 11, 2016	1109	Tuesday 8:00 p.m.	10.88	2.6	9	
10	"The Battles, Part 3"	October 17, 2016	1110	Monday 8:00 p.m.	11.38	2.7	9	
11	"The Battles, Part 4"	October 18, 2016	1111	Tuesday 8:00 p.m.	10.58	2.5	8	
12	"The Knockouts Premiere, Part 1"	October 24, 2016	1112	Monday 8:00 p.m.	11.17	2.7	9	
13	"The Knockouts Premiere, Part 2"	October 25, 2016	1113	Tuesday 8:00 p.m.	9.41	2.1	7	
14	"The Knockouts, Part 3"	October 31, 2016	1114	Monday 8:00 p.m.	9.48	2.0	8	
15	"The Road to the Live Shows"	November 1, 2016	1115	Tuesday 8:00 p.m.	6.86	1.5	5	
16	"The Live Playoffs"	November 7, 2016	1116	Monday 8:00 p.m.	9.97	2.3	7	
17	"Live Top 12 Performance"	November 14, 2016	1117	Monday 8:00 p.m.	10.03	2.3	7	
18	"Live Top 12 Results"	November 15, 2016	1118	Tuesday 8:00 p.m.	9.75	2.1	7	
19	"Live Top 11 Performance"	November 21, 2016	1119	Monday 8:00 p.m.	9.64	2.1	7	
20	"Live Top 11 Results"	November 22, 2016	1120	Tuesday 8:00 p.m.	9.48	1.8	6	
21	"Live Top 10 Performance"	November 28, 2016	1121	Monday 8:00 p.m.	9.81	2.1	7	
22	"Live Top 10 Results"	November 29, 2016	1122	Tuesday 8:00 p.m.	10.64	1.9	7	
23	"Live Top 8 Semi-finals Performance"	December 5, 2016	1123	Monday 8:00 p.m.	10.08	2.1	7	
24	"Live Top 8 Semi-finals Results"	December 6, 2016	1124	Tuesday 8:00 p.m.	10.16	1.9	7	
25	"Live Finale Performance"	December 12, 2016	1125	Monday 8:00 p.m.	11.23	2.2	7	
26	"Live Finale Results"	December 13, 2016	1126	Tuesday 9:00 p.m.	12.14	2.5	9	
