= Iam Tongi =

American singer

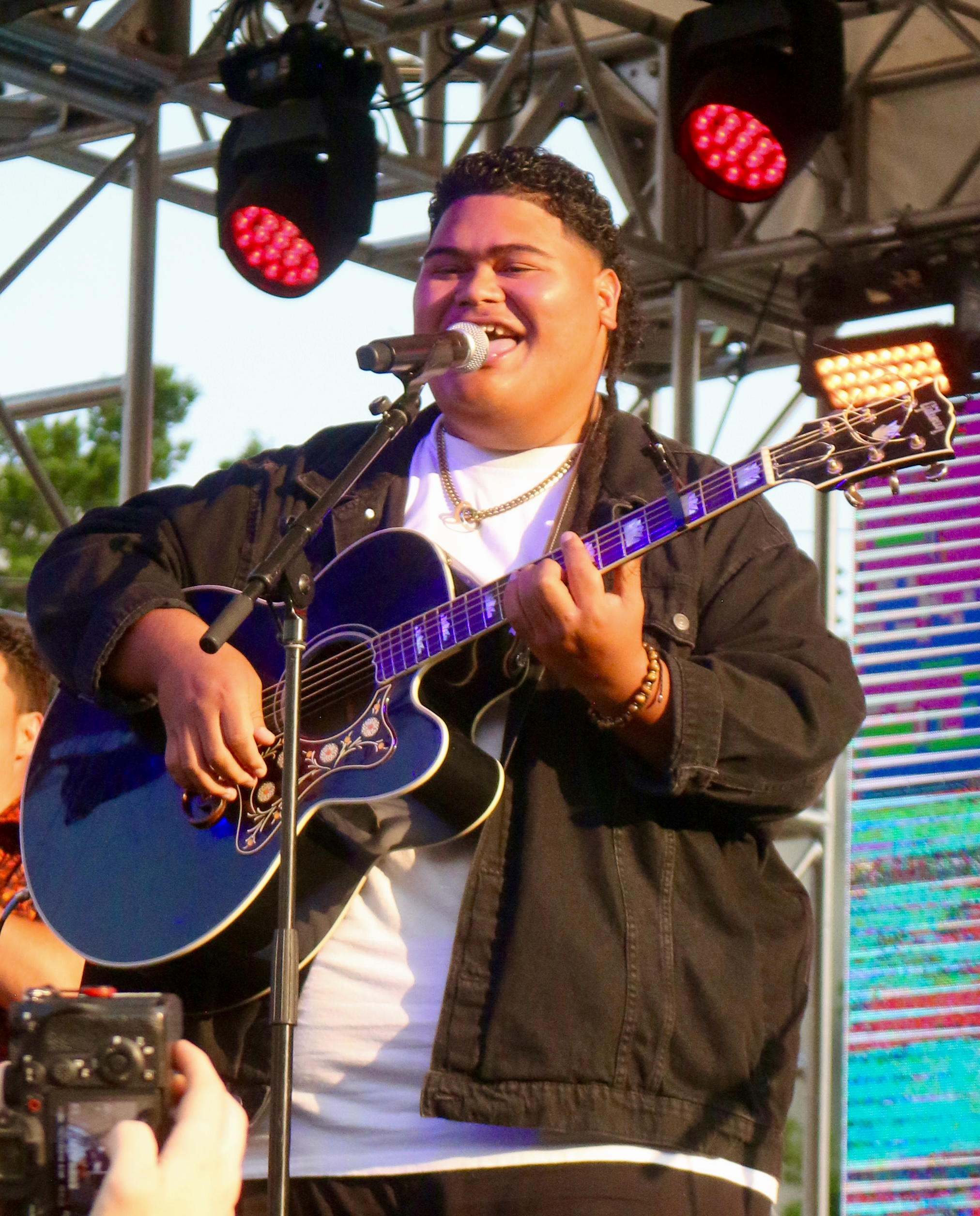
- Tongi performs at the 2025 19/Idol/BMG CMA Fest Takeover in Nashville, TN.

Background information
- Born: William Guy Tongi; September 1, 2004 (age 21); Kahuku, Hawaii, U.S.
- Genres: Reggae
- Occupation: Singer
- Instruments: Vocals; acoustic guitar; ukulele
- Years active: 2020–present
- Website: iamtongiofficial.com

William "Iam" Guy Tongi (born September 1, 2004) is an American singer who won season 21 of American Idol. He is the first person from Hawaii, the first Pacific Islander, and the first non-country genre singer in three years, to win the competition. He is also the first winner to have been born after the show's premiere on June 11, 2002.

== Early life and education ==
Tongi is originally from Kahuku, Hawaii, on the island of Oahu. His family relocated to Federal Way, Washington in the summer of 2019, where he attended Federal Way High School. He then later transferred and graduated from Decatur High School. He is of Samoan, Tongan, and Irish descent. Tongi is a member of The Church of Jesus Christ of Latter-day Saints.

The youngest of five children, Tongi learned to play the ukulele in fifth grade. When he was 13, his father gifted him a guitar that he had bought with his holiday paycheck. Tongi used the guitar in nearly all of his performances on American Idol.

== American Idol ==
=== Audition ===
Tongi auditioned for Season 20 of American Idol, but failed to get past the initial screening. Without telling him, his mother signed him up for the Season 21 auditions. Tongi was reluctant to audition again, however he was able to appear in front of judges Lionel Richie, Katy Perry, and Luke Bryan.

During the audition, Tongi talked about having to move to Washington because he was "priced out of paradise". When asked about his father, Tongi became teary-eyed, explaining that Rodney, his dad, had died a few months before the audition, and that Rodney was the one who got him into music. Tongi had not originally planned to talk about his dad because he did not want his journey to be seen as a sob story.

Tongi's audition, a rendition of James Blunt's song "Monsters", which he dedicated to his father, earned him a standing ovation from all three judges and a unanimous vote to the next round. The audition video quickly went viral, drawing 112,000 Instagram followers in the two days after Tongi's performance. Tongi's audition also became Idol's most-watched audition video on the show's YouTube channel, generating over 16 million views in three months.

=== Hollywood Week ===
During Hollywood Week on American Idol Tongi's guitar broke and he lost his voice. When he appeared before the judges, he started crying, explaining that he had promised his dad he would use the guitar on every performance. Tongi later said he felt like it was a way of his dad telling him he could do it on his own, and he appeared in later rounds without his guitar.

=== Duet with James Blunt ===
During American Idol's season finale, Tongi teamed up with James Blunt to deliver an emotionally charged duet of Blunt's song "Monsters", the same song Tongi had used for his audition. The performance left both the judges and audience in tears. Tongi himself broke down part way through the song but eventually regained his composure and finished. He told Rolling Stone,

"My dad always told me that I'm gonna make it one day and that he probably wouldn't be around to see me be successful. When I was on stage, I was crying because I was thinking about when he said that to me. He was hoping this for me since the beginning."

Blunt said of the performance,

"I sang on American Idol with Iam Tongi, and actually he broke down in tears, and then you suddenly realize the desperation of that moment because poor him, his father had died. And really living that. And the poignancy in the next line is, ‘I’ll leave a light on, I’ll be the last one, and I’ll leave a light on / There’d be no darkness in your heart.’ [and] it’s a real moment where you can imagine the death of your closest relative, and it’s a really amazing moment to live it. In many ways, I think I am, and I really lived it on a stage together."

=== Controversy ===
Tongi's win left Idol fans divided, with some praising him while others criticized the show, saying he won on sympathy alone. Runner-up Megan Danielle defended Tongi, saying, "Iam was deserving and he's so humble and so talented." Tongi meanwhile said he approached the announcement of the winner with an open mind: "I didn't expect to make it this far. No matter [who won], I was going to be happy."

=== Legacy ===
Tongi's song choices during the competition included a remake of Hawaiian reggae group Kolohe Kai's song "Cool Down", which he performed during the finale. Hawaii recording artists and producers alike praised Tongi for bringing island music to a national stage. Roman De Peralta, Kolohe Kai's frontman, said:

"[The American Idol audience is] a demographic that we don't really get to share our culture, our island vibes with. I feel like [Tongi's song choices] really paved a beautiful way for us as artists to be in front of people we really never got to."

Native Hawaiian recording artist Kimie Miner added:

"We don't see a lot of people like us being marketed in mainstream music. So, what Iam was able to do by being on [American Idol] and having this platform is he showed everybody that there's a big desire for the kind of music we have here. It showed the world how AAPI artists are equally competitive in this music industry while we're still being true to our culture, representing our island life, heritage, and 'ohana."

Tongi said he was grateful to be able to showcase the genre to Idol viewers:

"I wanted to represent the islands, and represent where I'm from, people in Hawaii... I just wanted to put island music on the map because island music is so beautiful, but a lot of people don't really know about it, only islanders."

Tongi also said he hopes his journey encourages other Polynesians to pursue careers in music:

"A lot of Polynesians are way better than me and they’re just too scared to do stuff like this. It’s just the Polynesian way: you don’t want to embarrass yourself. There’s a lot of pride in our culture. We don’t want to look dumb or anything, so we just tried to just stick to our own lane.”

== Career ==
Before appearing on American Idol, Tongi released a single, "Dreams", which he wrote for his sister's wedding in 2020. Other pre-Idol singles included a cover of ABBA's "The Winner Takes It All" and another original single, "Gone".

A few days prior to Idol's season finale, Tongi released the single "I'll Be Seeing You". The song reached No. 3 on Billboard's Digital Song Sales and No. 1 on Rock Digital Song Sales, from 11,000 downloads.

Tongi credits Hawaii-born singer Jack Johnson for mentoring him and helping him navigate the music industry. He also credits his family with keeping him grounded in the face of fame. Tongi says the biggest lesson he has learned since winning the competition is to "Be yourself. Don’t let people push you or try to mold you into another person."

In a May 2025 interview with People, Tongi revealed that he had managed to lose weight while working with a personal trainer. "We have a workout session maybe around 11, come back [home], and we go to an ice bath or sauna... or whatever it is. And then we come back, shower and go on a walk. And I've lost 115 lbs. It feels amazing. I feel great."

=== Post-Idol highlights ===
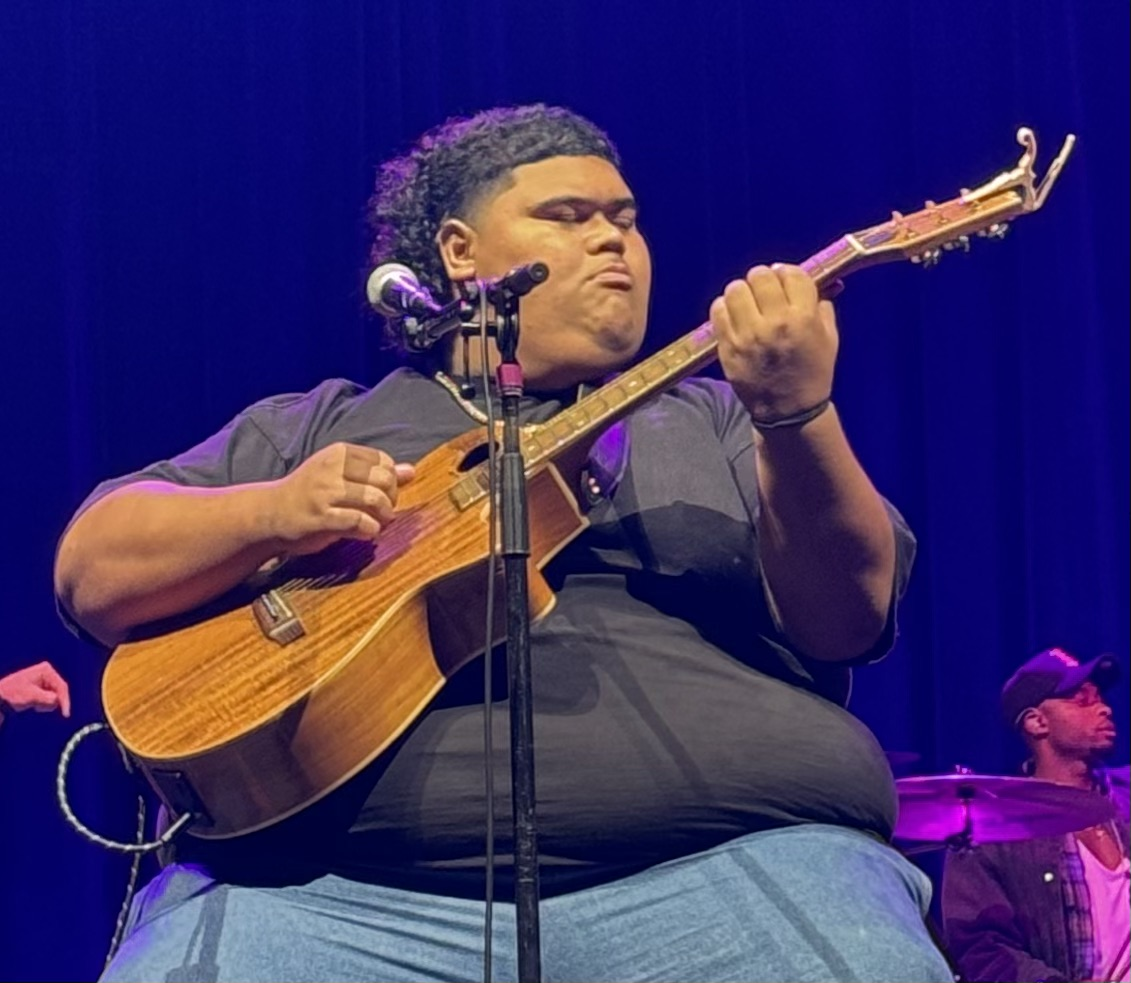
Iam Tongi at a rehearsal.

Shortly after winning Idol, Tongi embarked on a tour that saw him reunite with fellow contestant Oliver Steele, who finished in the Top 8 and with whom Tongi formed a special bond during the competition. During the tour, while both Tongi and Steele were on Oahu, a local guitar maker gifted the duo custom made, matching ukuleles to symbolize their friendship.

On July 1, 2023, at a concert at the Turtle Bay Resort, Tongi surprised the audience by inviting Roman De Peralta from Kolohe Kai to join him on stage to perform "Cool Down", the same song he showcased on Idol. The concert was their first time performing the song together. De Peralta said afterward, "He's coming home after an epic win, and I texted him, are you going to jam 'Cool Down' tomorrow? And he said yeah, and I said, ‘Can I join?’ and he was really stoked. I am honored to be here."

On July 10, 2023, Tongi sang the national anthem at the 2023 Home Run Derby, but forgot to remove the baseball cap he was wearing before he sang. Tongi apologized on social media, attributing the faux pas to being nervous performing in front of such a large crowd.

On August 12, 2023, Tongi released an Instagram video honoring the victims of the 2023 Maui wildfires. Encouraging his fans to donate, and expressing his love and support for the people of Maui, he sang a cover of Israel Kamakawiwo'ole's "Starting All Over Again".

On August 25, 2023, Tongi released a studio version of his duet with James Blunt of Blunt's song "Monsters". Tongi wrote on social media, "From covering it on TikTok 3 years ago to singing it in my audition on @americanidol, to performing it at the Idol finale with @jamesblunt , “Monsters” means so much to me."

On September 22, 2023, Tongi released another original single, "Why Kiki?" followed by his first holiday EP, "An Iam Tongi Christmas", which included his versions of "White Christmas", "The Christmas Song", and "Mele Kalikimaka".

In 2025, Tongi recorded a new version of the song "Hawaiian Roller Coaster Ride" for the live action film Lilo & Stitch. Tongi released the song on May 9 and returned to the Idol stage on May 12 to perform the song.

== Discography ==
=== Singles ===
List of singles, with selected chart positions
Title	Year	Peak chart positions					Sales
Title	Year	US Digital	US Rock	US Rock Digital	US World	NZ Hot	Sales
"I'll Be Seeing You"	2023	3	19	1	—	—	US: 11,000
"The Winner Takes It All"	2023	—	—	19	—	—	US: 2,000
"Why Kiki?"	2023	—	—	—	1	—	
"Hawaiian Roller Coaster Ride" (with the Kamehameha Schools Children's Chorus)	2025	—	—	—	1	37	
"—" denotes releases that did not chart
