= American Idol season 21 =

American Idol
- Season 21
- Promotional poster
- Hosted by: Ryan Seacrest
- Judges: Luke Bryan; Katy Perry; Lionel Richie
- Winner: Iam Tongi
- Runner-up: Megan Danielle
- Finals venue: Red Studios Hollywood
- No. of episodes: 20

Release
- Original network: ABC
- Original release: February 19 – May 21, 2023

Season chronology
- ← Previous; Season 20 Next → Season 22

The twenty-first season of American Idol premiered on February 19, 2023, on the ABC television network. Ryan Seacrest returned as host; Luke Bryan, Katy Perry, and Lionel Richie returned as judges.

Iam Tongi won the season on May 21, 2023, while Megan Danielle was the runner-up, and Colin Stough finished in third place.

== Auditions ==
The Idol Across America virtual auditions program returned from the previous two seasons. Remote auditions took place from August 3 to September 14, 2022, as well as a number of open-call auditions, and from these, the producers selected the contestants who were then invited to audition in front of the judges.

The "platinum ticket" also returned from last season. During the audition round, a total of three platinum tickets were awarded, and they gave the recipients the opportunity to advance directly to the second round of Hollywood week as well as choose their partners for that week's duet challenge before the remaining contestants were paired. During the American Music Awards, three contestants advancing to Hollywood week also were given the opportunity to win a fourth platinum ticket. The platinum ticket recipients were Cam Amen, Kaylin Hedges, Elijah McCormick, and Tyson Venegas.

American Idol (season 21) – auditions
City	Filming date(s)	Filming venue
Las Vegas, Nevada	September 26–29, 2022	Waldorf Astoria Las Vegas
New Orleans, Louisiana	October 10–13, 2022	Four Seasons Hotel New Orleans
Nashville, Tennessee	November 10–13, 2022	Kimpton Aertson Hotel

== Hollywood week ==
Hollywood week was filmed December 4–7, 2022, at the Los Angeles Theatre in Los Angeles. There were some changes to the format this season. Instead of having the contestants choose a specific genre, the contestants instead had to choose one area of performance to work on: confidence, songwriting, and stage presence. Contestants were again mentored by American Idol alumni: Clay Aiken and David Archuleta (confidence), Phillip Phillips and Catie Turner (songwriting), and Justin Guarini and Jordin Sparks (stage presence). Those who impressed the judges advanced to the next round. The contestants performed duets and got to pick their duet partners, but Platinum Ticket winners got to pick first, and they could even pick from each other. They were given twelve hours to rehearse, which included consultation with a vocal coach, a stage rehearsal, and advice from one of the judges. Judges could advance either, neither, or both of the contestants to the Showstopper round.

== Showstopper round ==
The Showstopper round featured the top 55 contestants performing for the judges and a live audience at the Los Angeles Theatre. This round was aired on April 9 and April 10, but only 35 contestants were aired. The judges then narrowed the number of contestants down to 26. The following is a list of the contestants who reached the top 26 and the song they performed. Contestants are listed in the order they performed.

Showstopper round (April 9 & 10)
Contestant	Song
Kaeyra	"River"
Warren Peay	"Whipping Post"
Nutsa	"Proud Mary"
Michael Williams	"Angels like You"
PJAE	"I Want You"
Malik Heard	"Can We Talk"
Wé Ani	"Ain't No Way"
Zachariah Smith	"Don't Stop Me Now"
Tyson Venegas	"Cuz I Love You"
Haven Madison	"Bird Set Free"
Lucy Love	"Flying Without Wings"
Paige Anne (Note: Paige Anne was originally eliminated, but was invited back after contestant Beckett Rex withdrew from the competition.)	"California Dreamin'"
Megan Danielle	"Always Remember Us This Way"
Marybeth Byrd	"Flat on the Floor"
Oliver Steele	"Everybody Wants to Rule the World"
Emma Busse	"Chasing Pavements"
Elijah McCormick	"Believe for It"
Elise Kristine	"Feeling Good"
Olivia Soli	"All by Myself"
Dawson Wayne	"Flying"
Mariah Faith	"I Ain't Living Long Like This"
Hannah Nicolaisen	"I Don't Want to Be"
Nailyah Serenity	"Superstar"
Matt Wilson	"Forever"
Colin Stough	"Cold"
Iam Tongi	"The Sound of Silence"

== Top 26 (April 16 & 17) ==
The top 26 contestants were split into two groups of thirteen and performed one solo each at the Aulani resort in Kapolei, Hawaii. The first group aired on April 16, and the second group on April 17. Allen Stone served as a guest mentor for the first group, and Noah Cyrus for the second group. Three contestants from each group were eliminated based on the public vote, and the rest advanced to the top 20. Contestants are listed in the order they performed.

Color key:

This contestant was saved by America's vote.
This contestant was eliminated.

Group 1 (April 16)
Contestant	Song	Result
Elise Kristine	"Holding Out for a Hero"	Eliminated
Oliver Steele	"Better Together"	Safe
Matt Wilson	"Speechless"	Safe
Kaeyra	"Don't Let Go (Love)"	Safe
PJAE	"Golden"	Eliminated
Zachariah Smith	"Lucille"	Safe
Mariah Faith	"You Should Probably Leave"	Safe
Emma Busse	"Lay Me Down"	Eliminated
Warren Peay	"Set Fire to the Rain"	Safe
Nailyah Serenity	"Lovin' You"	Safe
Haven Madison	"The Middle"	Safe
Lucy Love	"What's Love Got to Do with It"	Safe
Iam Tongi	"Don't Let Go"	Safe

Group 2 (April 17)
Contestant	Song	Result
Elijah McCormick	"Good Vibes"	Eliminated
Paige Anne	"Wrecking Ball"	Safe
Marybeth Byrd	"Heart Like a Truck"	Safe
Wé Ani	"Edge of Midnight (Midnight Sky Remix)"	Safe
Michael Williams	"Tuesdays"	Safe
Dawson Wayne	"Copycat"	Eliminated
Hannah Nicolaisen	"Glitter in the Air"	Safe
Megan Danielle	"The Chain"	Safe
Malik Heard	"Ain't It Fun"	Eliminated
Olivia Soli	"Emotions"	Safe
Colin Stough	"Midnight Train to Memphis"	Safe
Tyson Venegas	"It Will Rain"	Safe
Nutsa	"Paris (Ooh La La)"	Safe

Non-competition performance (April 16)
Performer	Song
Allen Stone	"Is This Love"

Non-competition performance (April 17)
Performer	Song
Noah Cyrus	"Everybody Needs Someone"

== Top 20 (April 23 & 24) ==
The top 20 performances aired on Sunday, April 23, followed by the live results show on Monday, April 24.

Color key:

This contestant was chosen by the public to advance.
This contestant was not chosen by the public, and had to perform again for the judges.
This contestant was not chosen by the public, but was chosen by the judges as a Wild Card pick.
This contestant was eliminated.

Contestants are listed in the order they performed.

Top 20 (April 23)
Contestant	Song	Result
Zachariah Smith	"I Want to Know What Love Is"	Safe
Matt Wilson	"Say You Won't Let Go"	Wild Card
Nailyah Serenity	"Baby Love"	Wild Card
Warren Peay	"Up There Down Here"	Safe
Kaeyra	"Bruises"	Wild Card
Mariah Faith	"Cry to Me"	Wild Card
Iam Tongi	"The Winner Takes It All"	Safe
Haven Madison	"Mean Girls"	Safe
Oliver Steele	"Too Soon"	Safe
Lucy Love	"Boulders"	Wild Card
Hannah Nicolaisen	"Somebody to Love"	Wild Card
Olivia Soli	"I Surrender"	Wild Card
Marybeth Byrd	"People Pleaser"	Safe
Michael Williams	"Lose You to Love Me"	Wild Card
Paige Anne	"Say Something"	Wild Card
Nutsa	"Un-Break My Heart"	Wild Card
Tyson Venegas	"180"	Safe
Megan Danielle	"Holy Water"	Safe
Colin Stough	"Pretty Heart"	Safe
Wé Ani	"Skyfall"	Safe

Top 20 (April 24)
Contestant	Song	Result
Wé Ani	"This Is Me"	Safe
Michael Williams	"Golden Hour"	Eliminated
Hannah Nicolaisen	"Royals"	Eliminated
Warren Peay	"It's Not My Time"	Safe
Mariah Faith	"If It Hadn't Been for Love"	Eliminated
Haven Madison	"15"	Safe
Nailyah Serenity	"Alive"	Eliminated
Paige Anne	"I Am Here"	Eliminated
Matt Wilson	"For Tonight"	Eliminated
Tyson Venegas	"Don't Let the Sun Go Down on Me"	Safe
Colin Stough	"Dancing on My Own"	Safe
Marybeth Byrd	"Cover Me Up"	Safe
Kaeyra	"If I Were Your Woman"	Eliminated
Oliver Steele	"You're Still the One"	Safe
Olivia Soli	"God Is a Woman"	Eliminated
Iam Tongi	"Stuck on You"	Safe
Zachariah Smith	"Hold the Line"	Safe
Lucy Love	"Radioactive"	Saved by the judges
Megan Danielle	"Thank God I Do"	Safe
Nutsa	"And I Am Telling You I'm Not Going"	Saved by the judges

Non-competition performances
Performers	Song
Smokey Robinson	"I Second That Emotion" "If We Don't Have Each Other"
Noah Thompson & HunterGirl	"One Day Tonight"

== Finals ==
Color key:

This contestant was saved by America's vote.
This contestant was saved by the judges.
This contestant was eliminated.
This contestant won American Idol.
This contestant was the runner-up.
This contestant finished in third place.

=== Top 12 – Rock and Roll Hall of Fame (April 30) ===
Adam Lambert served as a guest mentor this week. Each contestant performed one song from inductees of the Rock and Roll Hall of Fame. Contestants are listed in the order they performed.

Top 12 (April 30)
Contestant	Song	Result
Tyson Venegas	"For Once in My Life"	Safe
Warren Peay	"The House of the Rising Sun"	Safe
Haven Madison	"Livin' on a Prayer"	Safe
Lucy Love	"All Night Long (All Night)"	Eliminated
Oliver Steele	"Georgia on My Mind"	Safe
Colin Stough	"Midnight Rider"	Safe
Marybeth Byrd	"Dancing Queen"	Safe
Wé Ani	"Something's Got a Hold on Me"	Safe
Nutsa	"The Show Must Go On"	Eliminated
Megan Danielle	"Angel from Montgomery"	Safe
Zachariah Smith	"Don't Bring Me Down"	Safe
Iam Tongi	"Bring It On Home to Me"	Safe

Non-competition performance
Performer	Song
Adam Lambert	"I Can't Stand the Rain"

=== Top 10 – Judges' song contest (May 1) ===
The judges chose songs for each of the contestants to perform. Katy Perry had the most song choices selected by the contestants, and was able to save one contestant from elimination. Contestants are listed in the order they performed.

Top 10 (May 1)
Contestant	Song	Selected by	Result
Zachariah Smith	"Wanted Dead or Alive"	Lionel Richie	Safe
Haven Madison	"The Only Exception"	Katy Perry	Safe
Wé Ani	"I Have Nothing"	Luke Bryan	Safe
Oliver Steele	"High and Dry"	Katy Perry	Saved by Katy Perry
Warren Peay	"Colder Weather"	Lionel Richie	Safe
Iam Tongi	"What a Wonderful World"	Luke Bryan	Safe
Marybeth Byrd	"Wasted on You"	Lionel Richie	Eliminated
Tyson Venegas	"Someone You Loved"	Katy Perry	Eliminated
Megan Danielle	"Go Rest High on That Mountain"	Luke Bryan	Safe
Colin Stough	"It's Been Awhile"	Katy Perry	Safe

Non-competition performance
Performer	Song
Chayce Beckham	"Till The Day I Die"

=== Top 8 – Alanis Morissette & Ed Sheeran (May 7) ===
Alanis Morissette served as a guest mentor this week, and also served as a guest judge along with Ed Sheeran. Each contestant performed two songs: one solo from the Alanis Morissette discography and one song from the Ed Sheeran discography performed as a duet with a fellow contestant. Contestants are listed in the order they performed.

Top 8 (May 7)
Contestant	Order	Song	Result
Warren Peay	1	"All I Really Want"	Eliminated
Zachariah Smith	2	"Ironic"	Safe
Haven Madison	4	"You Learn"	Eliminated
Colin Stough	6	"Hand in My Pocket"	Safe
Megan Danielle	8	"Head over Feet"	Safe
Iam Tongi	9	"Guardian"	Safe
Wé Ani	10	"Uninvited"	Safe
Oliver Steele	12	"You Oughta Know"	Eliminated
Oliver Steele & Iam Tongi	3	"Photograph"	
Wé Ani & Warren Peay	5	"Perfect"	
Haven Madison & Zachariah Smith	7	"Thinking Out Loud"	
Megan Danielle & Colin Stough	11	"Dive"	

Non-competition performances
Performer	Song
Alanis Morissette	"Thank U"
Ed Sheeran	"Eyes Closed"

=== Top 5 – Disney (May 14) ===
Sofia Carson served as a guest mentor this week. Each contestant performed two songs from Disney films. Contestants are listed in the order they performed.

Top 5 – Disney (May 14)
Contestant	Order	Song	Disney film	Result
Wé Ani	1	"Into the Unknown"	Frozen II	Eliminated
Wé Ani	6	"The Climb"	Hannah Montana: The Movie	Eliminated
Zachariah Smith	2	"I Just Can't Wait to Be King"	The Lion King	Eliminated
Zachariah Smith	7	"Life Is a Highway"	Cars	Eliminated
Colin Stough	3	"Real Gone"	Cars	Safe
Colin Stough	8	"Nobody Knows"	Pete's Dragon	Safe
Megan Danielle	4	"You Can't Stop the Girl"	Maleficent: Mistress of Evil	Safe
Megan Danielle	9	"Carried Me with You"	Onward	Safe
Iam Tongi	5	"Lava"	Lava	Safe
Iam Tongi	10	"Father and Son"	Guardians of the Galaxy Vol. 2	Safe

Non-competition performances
Performers	Song
Top 5 with Sara Bareilles	"When You Wish Upon a Star" (from Pinocchio)
Halle Bailey	"Part of Your World" (from The Little Mermaid)

=== Top 3 – Finale (May 21) ===
Each contestant performed two songs – one from the Keith Urban discography and one dedicated to their hometowns – before the contestant who had the fewest votes up to that point was eliminated, thereby finishing in third place. The remaining two contestants performed one last song as voting continued. Contestants are listed in the order they performed.

Finale (May 21)
Contestant	Order	Song	Result
Megan Danielle	1	"God Whispered Your Name"	Runner-up
Megan Danielle	4	"Faithfully"	Runner-up
Megan Danielle	7	"Dream Girl"	Runner-up
Iam Tongi	2	"Making Memories of Us"	Winner
Iam Tongi	5	"Cool Down"	Winner
Iam Tongi	8	"I'll Be Seeing You"	Winner
Colin Stough	3	"Stupid Boy"	Third place
Colin Stough	6	"Either Way"	Third place

Non-competition performances
Performers	Song
Pitbull & Lil Jon	"Jumpin"
Top 12 with Pitbull & Lil Jon	"Give Me Everything"
Lucy Love with TLC	"No Scrubs" "Creep" "Waterfalls"
Zachariah Smith with Kevin Cronin	"Take It on the Run"
Oliver Steele with Jelly Roll & Lainey Wilson	"Save Me" "Need A Favor"
Kylie Minogue	"Padam Padam"
Nutsa with Kylie Minogue	"Can't Get You Out of My Head"
Top 12 with Lionel Richie	"Sail On"
Keith Urban	"Wild Hearts"
Iam Tongi with James Blunt	"Monsters"
Ellie Goulding	"Miracle"
Tyson Venegas with Ellie Goulding	"Burn"
Lauren Daigle	"These Are the Days"
Megan Danielle with Lauren Daigle	"Thank God I Do"
Luke Bryan	"But I Got a Beer in My Hand"
Colin Stough with Luke Bryan	"Slow Hand"
Wé Ani with Jazmine Sullivan	"Bust Your Windows"
Marybeth Byrd & Warren Peay with Lainey Wilson	"Heart Like a Truck"
Haven Madison with Katy Perry	"I Still Need You" "By the Grace of God"
Iam Tongi & Megan Danielle with Ruben Studdard & Clay Aiken	"The Impossible Dream (The Quest)"
Iam Tongi	"Don't Let Go"

== Elimination chart ==
Color key:

Winner
Runner-up
Third place
Did not perform
Saved by the public
Saved by the judges
Eliminated

American Idol (season 21) - Eliminations
Contestant	Pl.	Top 26		Top 20	Top 12	Top 10	Top 8	Top 5	Finale
Contestant	Pl.	4/16	4/17	4/23	4/30	5/1	5/7	5/14	5/21
Iam Tongi	1	Safe	N/A	Safe	Safe	Safe	Safe	Safe	Winner
Megan Danielle	2	N/A	Safe	Safe	Safe	Safe	Safe	Safe	Runner-up
Colin Stough	3	N/A	Safe	Safe	Safe	Safe	Safe	Safe	Third place
Wé Ani	4	N/A	Safe	Safe	Safe	Safe	Safe	Eliminated	
Zachariah Smith	4	Safe	N/A	Safe	Safe	Safe	Safe	Eliminated	
Haven Madison	6	Safe	N/A	Safe	Safe	Safe	Eliminated		
Warren Peay	6	Safe	N/A	Safe	Safe	Safe	Eliminated		
Oliver Steele	6	Safe	N/A	Safe	Safe	Saved	Eliminated		
Marybeth Byrd	9	N/A	Safe	Safe	Safe	Eliminated			
Tyson Venegas	9	N/A	Safe	Safe	Safe	Eliminated			
Lucy Love	11	Safe	N/A	Saved	Eliminated				
Nutsa	11	N/A	Safe	Saved	Eliminated				
Paige Anne		N/A	Safe	Eliminated					
Mariah Faith		Safe	N/A	Eliminated					
Hannah Nicolaisen		N/A	Safe	Eliminated					
Kaeyra		Safe	N/A	Eliminated					
Nailyah Serenity		Safe	N/A	Eliminated					
Olivia Soli		N/A	Safe	Eliminated					
Michael Williams		N/A	Safe	Eliminated					
Matt Wilson		Safe	N/A	Eliminated					
Malik Heard		N/A	Eliminated						
Elijah McCormick		N/A	Eliminated						
Dawson Wayne		N/A	Eliminated						
Emma Busse		Eliminated							
Elise Kristine		Eliminated							
PJAE		Eliminated							

== Ratings ==
Viewership and ratings per episode of American Idol season 21
No.	Title	Air date	Timeslot (ET)	Rating/share (18–49)	Viewers (millions)	DVR (18–49)	DVR viewers (millions)	Total (18–49)	Total viewers (millions)
1	"Auditions, Part 1"	February 19, 2023	Sunday 8:00 p.m.	0.6/6	5.27	0.2	1.63	0.8	6.90
2	"Auditions, Part 2"	February 26, 2023	Sunday 8:00 p.m.	0.7/7	5.25	—N/a	1.35	—N/a	6.60
3	"Auditions, Part 3"	March 5, 2023	Sunday 8:00 p.m.	0.7/6	5.62	0.2	1.38	0.9	7.00
4	"Auditions, Part 3A"	March 13, 2023	Monday 12:15 a.m.	0.6/11	3.34	—N/a	—N/a	—N/a	—N/a
5	"Auditions, Part 4"	March 19, 2023	Sunday 8:00 p.m.	0.6/5	4.88	—N/a	—N/a	—N/a	—N/a
6	"Auditions, Part 5"	March 26, 2023	Sunday 8:00 p.m.	0.7/6	5.25	—N/a	—N/a	—N/a	—N/a
7	"Hollywood Week Part #1"	April 2, 2023	Sunday 8:00 p.m.	0.7/6	5.06	—N/a	—N/a	—N/a	—N/a
8	"Hollywood Week Part #2"	April 3, 2023	Monday 8:00 p.m.	0.5/5	4.42	—N/a	—N/a	—N/a	—N/a
9	"Showstopper/Final Judgment Part #1"	April 9, 2023	Sunday 8:00 p.m.	0.5/5	4.58	—N/a	—N/a	—N/a	—N/a
10	"Showstopper/Final Judgment Part #2"	April 10, 2023	Monday 8:00 p.m.	0.6/5	4.46	—N/a	—N/a	—N/a	—N/a
11	"Top 26 at Disney's Aulani Resort in Hawaii Part #1"	April 16, 2023	Sunday 8:00 p.m.	0.6/6	5.35	—N/a	—N/a	—N/a	—N/a
12	"Top 26 at Disney's Aulani Resort in Hawaii Part #2"	April 17, 2023	Monday 8:00 p.m.	0.5/5	4.36	—N/a	—N/a	—N/a	—N/a
13	"Top 20"	April 23, 2023	Sunday 8:00 p.m.	0.7/7	5.37	—N/a	—N/a	—N/a	—N/a
14	"Top 12 Reveal!"	April 24, 2023	Monday 8:00 p.m.	0.6/5	4.90	—N/a	—N/a	—N/a	—N/a
15	"Rock and Roll Hall of Fame Night"	April 30, 2023	Sunday 8:00 p.m.	0.7/7	5.92	0.4	1.58	1.1	7.50
16	"Judge's Song Contest"	May 1, 2023	Monday 8:00 p.m.	0.6/5	5.41	—N/a	—N/a	—N/a	—N/a
17	"Top 8: Alanis Morissette/Ed Sheeran"	May 7, 2023	Sunday 8:00 p.m.	0.8/7	6.12	0.3	1.58	1.1	7.70
18	"Disney Night"	May 14, 2023	Sunday 8:00 p.m.	0.9/10	6.33	0.3	1.57	1.2	7.90
19	"Journey to the Finale"	May 15, 2023	Monday 9:00 p.m.	0.3/3	2.70	—N/a	—N/a	—N/a	—N/a
20	"Season Finale"	May 21, 2023	Sunday 8:00 p.m.	0.8/8	6.62	0.2	1.09	1.1	7.71 (Note: Live+7 ratings were unavailable, so Live+3 ratings have been used instead.)
