= Ali Caldwell =

American singer (born 1988)

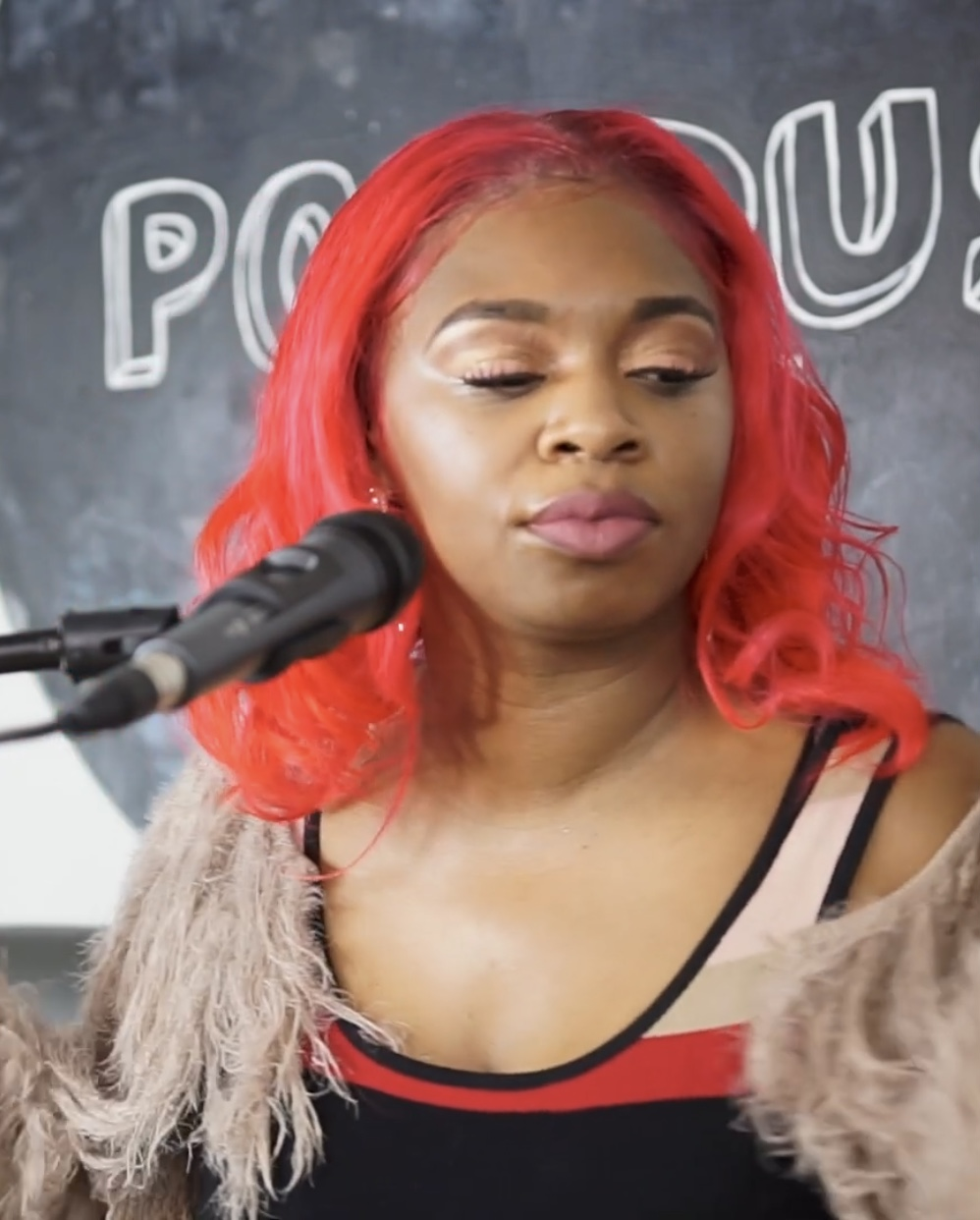
- Caldwell in 2019

Background information
- Born: Ali Caldwell; June 28, 1988 (age 38); Woodbridge, New Jersey, United States
- Genres: R&B, soul, pop
- Occupation: Singer-songwriter
- Instrument: Vocals
- Years active: 2007–present
- Label: 2MaroMusic™
- Formerly of: Xhale
- Website: alicaldwellmusic.com

Ali Caldwell (born June 28, 1988) is an American singer from Woodbridge, New Jersey. She began her career as a member of Xhale, a three-person R&B group. In 2016, Caldwell auditioned for Season 11 of the US edition of The Voice and competed as part of Team Miley Cyrus, finishing as a semi-finalist for the season.

== Early life ==
Ali Caldwell was born on June 28, 1988, in Woodbridge, New Jersey. She began singing at an early age, falling in love with music through the recordings of Brandy, Celine Dion and Faith Evans among many others. After high school, Ali skipped college to join Xhale, a three-person R&B group. Xhale opened for Boyz II Men on tour and performed for Patti LaBelle at her tribute concert. After meeting with several record labels, the group was unable to land a deal and eventually disbanded in 2010.

== Career ==
Caldwell later moved to New York City to continue her career. She performed regularly at NYC venues, including Drom, Milk River, and the Village Underground. Caldwell says one of the major moments of her young career came when director/comedian Tyler Perry attended one of her shows and posted about her performance on Facebook; "One of my favorite spots in NYC, the Village Underground. Ron Grant's open mic night. Listen to this girl. She's amazing!!! Her name is Ali Caldwell. So much fun."

In 2014, Caldwell had the opportunity to tour in Russia, performing 40+ shows that year. Caldwell later provided supporting vocals for Christina Aguilera during her record-breaking concert at Mawazine, one of the largest music festivals in the world which takes place in Morocco. To date, Caldwell has also headlined five multi-city tours in Europe.

As an independent artist, Caldwell released her 2015 EP entitled Heart of Ballads via 2MaroMusic™/ 2MaroMedia Inc., an imprint she co-owns with her manager Omar "O2" White.

In 2016, Caldwell auditioned for season 11 of the US edition of The Voice. She received a four-chair turn during her blind audition where she performed "Dangerous Woman" by Ariana Grande. Caldwell chose Miley Cyrus as her coach for the competition. She was widely considered a front-runner to win the competition throughout the season. In a broadcast on November 14, 2017, Caldwell delivered a moving performance of the late Leonard Cohen's "Did I Ever Love You" to rave reviews.

Caldwell finished the season in presumed fifth place, getting controversially eliminated after stunning renditions of Dolly Parton’s "I Will Always Love You" and Rihanna's "Sledgehammer". The former subsequently peaked at No. 6 on the Nielsen SoundScan R&B Genre Chart and No. 20 on the Billboard R&B/Hip-Hop Digital Song Sales chart.

Caldwell released the single "To Be Loved" on January 12, 2018, her first commercial release after her time on The Voice. Her debut studio album entitled 88 was released in early 2020 via 2MaroMusic™/ 2MaroMedia Inc.

In the summer of 2018, Caldwell was a contestant on season 2 of the reality television competition show The Four: Battle for Stardom. She lasted until the penultimate episode where fellow artist Whitney Reign took her "seat". This outcome, decided by the show's panel of judges, caused much controversy among viewers, as many of them believed that Caldwell deserved to advance over Reign after Caldwell's rendition of Mariah Carey's "My All".

== Discography ==
- "Heartbeat / CounterClockwise" (maxi-single) (2014)
- Heart of Ballads (EP) (2015)
- "To Be Loved" (single) (2018)
- 88 (studio album) (2020)
- "Trouble Town" (single) (2021)
