= Darlin' Don't Go =

Single by Sundance Head

from the album Soul Country
- Released: December 12, 2016
- Genre: Country soul
- Length: 3:30
- Label: Republic
- Songwriter(s): Sundance Head
- Producer(s): Blake Shelton

Sundance Head singles chronology
| "Darlin' Don't Go" (2016) | "How I Want to Be" (2017) |

"Darlin' Don't Go" is a song by the American country blues singer Sundance Head, recorded for his album Soul Country in 2015. It was later re-recorded and released as his winning single from The Voice, the popular singing competition. The song is written solely by Head.

== Charts ==
| Chart (2016) | Peak position |
|---|---|
| US Billboard Hot 100 | 67 |
| US Hot Country Songs (Billboard) | 4 |

== Release history ==
| Country | Date | Format | Label |
|---|---|---|---|
| United States | December 13, 2016 | Digital download | Republic |
