= Sundance Head =

American singer-songwriter

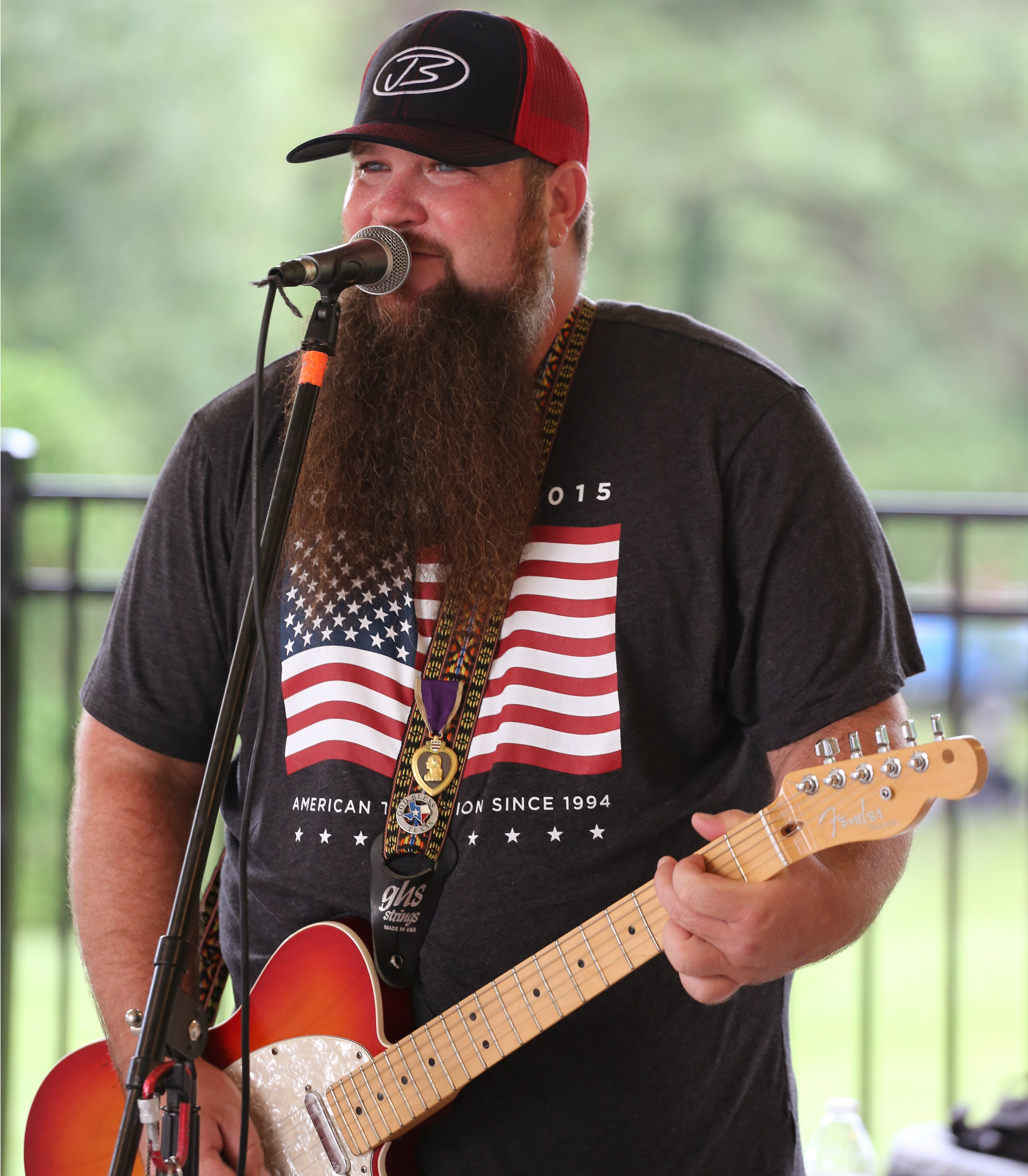
- Head performing in 2015

Background information
- Born: Jason Head; July 9, 1978 (age 47)
- Origin: Porter, Texas
- Genres: Country; Southern soul; blues; rock
- Occupations: Singer; songwriter
- Instruments: Vocals; guitar; bass guitar; piano
- Years active: 2007–present
- Labels: Wildcatter, Dreamcatcher
- Website: sundancehead.com

Jason "Sundance" Head (born July 9, 1978) is an American country-soul singer and songwriter. He is the son of American singer Roy Head. In 2007, he was a semi-finalist on the sixth season of the Fox television series American Idol but was eliminated one week before the finals. In 2016, he became the winner of season 11 of the American The Voice. He was part of Team Blake Shelton. His winning song is "Darlin' Don't Go". In 2018, he signed onto Dean Dillon's Wildcatter Records and released the single Leave Her Wild.

== Career ==
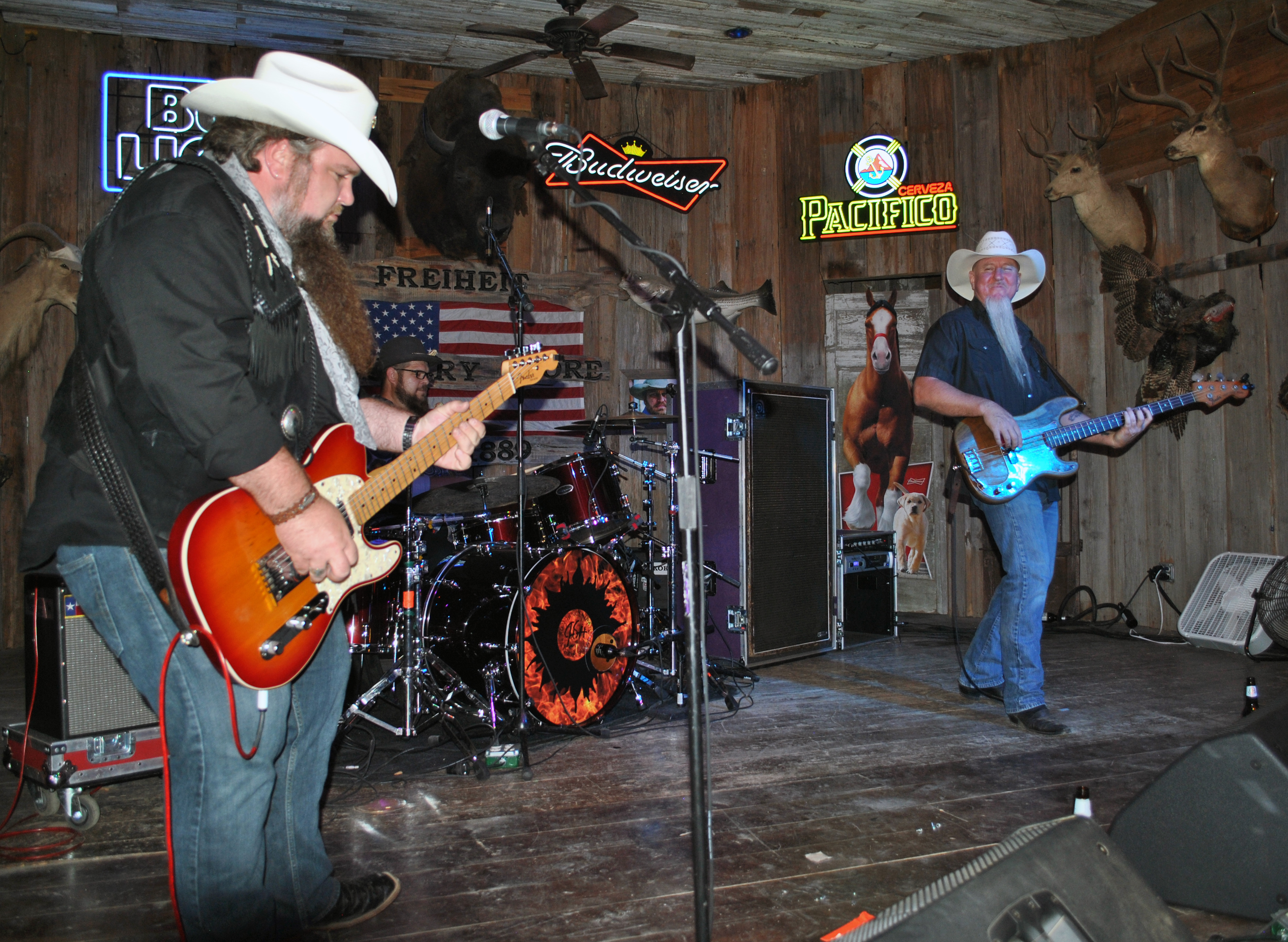
Sundance Head performs at Freiheit Country Store in New Braunfels, Texas in 2017

=== American Idol ===
American Idol performances

Week #	Theme	Song choice	Original artist	Order #	Result
Auditions	N/A	"Stormy Monday"	T-Bone Walker	N/A	Qualified
Top 24 (12 Men)	N/A	"Nights in White Satin"	The Moody Blues	3	Safe
Top 20 (10 Men)	N/A	"Mustang Sally"	Mack Rice	10	Safe
Top 16 (8 Men)	N/A	"Jeremy"	Pearl Jam	3	Eliminated

==== Post-Idol career ====
In May 2007, his father reported that he signed a recording contract with Universal Music Group. In late July 2007, he released a duet with Sabrina Sloan, who was also a semi-finalist in Season 6 of American Idol.

=== The Voice (2016) ===
The Voice performances
– Studio version of performance reached the top 10 on iTunes

Stage	Song	Original artist	Date	Order	Result
Blind Audition	"I've Been Loving You Too Long"	Otis Redding	Sept. 19, 2016	1.4	Adam Levine and Blake Shelton turned Joined Team Blake
Battles (Top 48)	"Feel Like Makin' Love" (vs. Dan Shafer)	Bad Company	Oct. 10, 2016	7.4	Saved by Blake
Knockouts (Top 32)	"The Climb" (vs. Josh Gallagher)	Miley Cyrus	Oct. 24, 2016	11.1	Saved by Blake
Live Playoffs (Top 20)	"Blue Ain't Your Color"	Keith Urban	Nov. 7, 2016	15.9	Saved by Public Vote
Live Top 12	"My Church"	Maren Morris	Nov. 14, 2016	17.1	Saved by Public Vote
Live Top 11	"No One"	Alicia Keys	Nov. 21, 2016	19.2	Saved by Public Vote
Live Top 10	"Me and Jesus"	Tom T. Hall	Nov. 28, 2016	21.9	Saved by Public Vote
Live Semifinals (Top 8)	"Love Can Build a Bridge"	The Judds	Dec. 5, 2016	23.7	Saved by Public Vote
Live Finale (Final 4)	"Darlin' Don't Go" (original song)	Sundance Head	Dec. 12, 2016	25.4	Winner
Live Finale (Final 4)	"Treat Her Right" (with Blake Shelton)	Roy Head and the Traits	Dec. 12, 2016	25.8	Winner
Live Finale (Final 4)	"At Last"	Glenn Miller and his orchestra	Dec. 12, 2016	25.10	Winner

Non competition performances
Order	Collaborator(s)	Song	Original Artist
19.1	Austin Allsup, Courtney Harrell, and Blake Shelton	"The Heart of Rock & Roll"	Huey Lewis and the News
22.2	Josh Gallagher	"Feelin' Alright?"	Traffic
25.8	Kiss	"Detroit Rock City" / "Rock and Roll All Nite"	Kiss
25.11	Austin Allsup and Courtney Harrell	"Ain't Worth the Whiskey"	Cole Swindell

== Personal life ==
On November 15, 2024, Head accidentally shot himself in the stomach at his Smith County, Texas ranch. According to Head in a statement released by his agent, Head had grabbed his own .22 caliber firearm from his Jeep and that it had slipped out of the holster, striking the outside of the vehicle before discharging, striking him in the stomach. Head did not have his phone with him at the time and was alone, so he went to the end of his driveway and flagged down multiple vehicles before one driver eventually stopped and contacted first responders. Head was transported by helicopter to a hospital in Tyler and ultimately did not require surgery.

== Discography ==
=== Releases from The Voice ===
==== Albums ====
Title	Album details	Peak chart positions		Sales
Title	Album details	US	US Country	Sales
The Voice: The Complete Season 11 Collection	Released: December 13, 2016; Label: Republic; Format: Digital download	30	36	US: 3,000
2016 & Gruene	Released: March 17, 2012; Label: Sundance Head; Format: CD, digital download	-	-	US: N/A
Soul Country	Released: April 25, 2015; Label: Sundance Head; Format: CD, digital download	-	-	US: N/A
Stained Glass and Neon	Released: January 25, 2019; Label: WildCatter Records; Format: CD, digital download	-	-	US: N/A
Starting Again	Released: September 16, 2022; Label: Sundance Head; Format: digital download	-	-	

==== Competition singles ====
Title	Year	Peak chart positions		Sales
Title	Year	US	US Country	Sales
"No One"	2016	—	32	US: 23,000
"Me and Jesus"	2016	— (Note: "Me and Jesus" did not enter the Billboard Hot 100, but peaked at number 13 on the Bubbling Under Hot 100 Singles chart.)	21	US: 48,000
"Love Can Build a Bridge"	2016	—	27	US: 26,000
"Darlin' Don't Go"	2016	67	4	US: 61,000
"Treat Her Right" (with Blake Shelton)	2016	—	24	US: 26,000
"At Last"	2016	89	11	US: 44,000

==== Texas Radio Singles ====
- 2016: "13 Years" #1
- 2017: "How I Want to Be" #1
- 2017: "Everything to Lose" #1
- 2018: "Leave Her Wild" #12
- 2019: "Close Enough to Walk" #1
- 2019: "Not Give a Damn" #9
- 2021: "I Bleed" #10
- 2021: "Showing Off" #1
- 2022: "Drive me to Drinking" #4
- 2022: "Three People (Me, Jim Beam, and You)" #1
- 2023: "Bars and Churches" #1

Notes

Awards and achievements
Preceded by Alisan Porter	The Voice (American); Winner; 2016 (Fall)	Succeeded by Chris Blue
Preceded by "Down That Road"	The Voice (American); Winner's song "Darlin' Don't Go"; 2016 (Fall)	Succeeded by "Money on You"
