= Kolohe Kai =

Hawaiian reggae band

- Origin: Oahu, Hawaii, U.S.
- Genres: Reggae; reggae fusion; pop; Hawaiian
- Years active: 2009–present
- Labels: GO Aloha Entertainment, R K D Inc.
- Members: Dennis Corpuz (lead singer); Jasmine Moikeha (vocals); Kolomona Ku (keyboard and saxophone, music director); Luke Daddario (drummer); Imua Garza (guitar); Kahale Morales (bass)
- Website: www.kolohekaimusic.com

Kolohe Kai is a Hawaiian reggae pop musical group formed in 2009 by music teacher, Mrs. Cone

Kolohe Kai consists of De Peralta, Jasmine Moikeha (vocals), Kolomona Ku (keyboard and saxophone), Luke Daddario (drummer), Imua Garza (guitar), and Kahale Morales (bass guitar).

== History ==
Circa 2006 in Oahu, the band members met in their high school Polynesian music class. After performing in local talent shows, 17-year-old Roman De Peralta signed with a record label followed by the rest of the band. De Peralta explains the band's name: Kolohe means "rascal", which his family called him as a child, while Kai means "ocean" or "saltwater".

The group's 2009 debut album was This is the Life, and their 2011 follow-up album was Love Town. Successful singles included "Cool Down" and "Ehu Girl". Their 2014 album Paradise reached third place on Billboard magazine's Reggae Album chart.

In 2019, Kolohe Kai released their fourth album, Summer To Winter, which reached number one on Billboard's Reggae Album chart.

On May 30th, 2025 Kolohe Kai released their fifth studio album called What Aloha Means. Following the release of this album they did a summer tour in the East Coast, then moving on to the West Coast, and ending in Hawaii.

== Musical style and influences ==
Kolohe Kai's musical style is generally described as reggae. Their sound has been characterized as Hawaiian-inflected reggae and Pacific Island reggae, infusing "the localism of ukulele music with rhythms of roots reggae." Their more recent material shows flavors of pop and R&B.

De Peralta has cited Hawaiian reggae band Ekolu, Fijian musician George Veikoso a.k.a. Fiji, and Boyz II Men as influences. They have also been influenced by reggae rock band Rebelution.

== Discography ==
=== Albums ===
==== Studio albums ====
- This is the Life (2009)
- Love Town (2011)
- Paradise (2014)
- Summer to Winter (2019)
- Hazel Eyes (2022)
- What Aloha Means (2025)

==== Live albums ====
- Live Album 10th Anniversary (2021)

==== Compilation albums ====
- Best of Kolohe Kai (Acoustic) (2021)

==== Extended plays ====
- This Is the Life (Acoustic Remix EP) (2013)
- Love Town (Acoustic Remix EP) (2013)

=== Singles ===
- "Higher" - 15 November 2016
- "Natural High" (Dub) - 1 June 2019
- "Will You Be Mine" (R&B Version) - 1 August 2019
- "Catching Lightning" - 24 July 2020
- "Speechless" - 28 February 2020
- "When the Rain Falls" - 15 October 2020
- "Isn't She Lovely" - 8 October 2021
- "I Think You're Beautiful" - 25 February 2022

=== Compilation appearances ===
- Sugarshack Selects, Vol. 2 - Round and Around (On the Spot in HI) (2020)

== Awards ==
Award	Year (Note: Indicates the year of ceremony.)	Recipient(s)	Category	Result	Ref.
Nā Hōkū Hanohano Awards	2013	Paradise	Reggae Album of the Year	Won	
Island Music Awards	2019	Summer to Winter	Reggae Album of the Year	Won	
