= The Four (franchise) =

Television music competition

- Created by: Armoza Formats
- Original work: The Four: Battle for Stardom (USA)
- Years: 2018–2020

Films and television
- Television series: The Four (see international versions)

Miscellaneous
- Genre: Music competition
- First aired: 4 January 2018; 8 years ago
- Distributor: Armoza Formats (owned by ITV Entertainment)

Official website
- Armoza Formats

The Four is a television music competition franchise created by British-Israeli production and distribution company, Armoza Formats. It first broadcast in the United States on Fox in January 2018.

== Format ==
The Four is a singing competition that differs among similar talent competitions, in that there are no stage auditions. The artists, also known as the challengers, are held in the holding room before singing in front of a live studio audience and the judges. The panel of people in the music industry ultimately decides the best challengers that compete against "The Four". The members consist of vocalists of varying genres, and they must win challenges against new artists to keep their seat and remain as a member of "The Four". At the end of the contest, the last singer standing among "The Four" wins the competition.

=== Rounds ===
There are two distinct rounds in The Four. In the performances round, new challengers must earn their seat by performing in front of a live studio audience, the panel of judges and "The Four". After the performance, the judges then vote and make a "Yes" or "No" decision, signifying the challenger's fate in the competition. If a challenger receives a unanimous "Yes" votes from the panel, they advance to the next round of the competition. A red ring given to the challenger signifies a "No", ending their time in the competition. Artists who advance to the challenge round can compete against a member of "The Four" for their seat. In a sing-off style battle, the challenger and "The Four" member sing against each other for their seat. After the challenge, the studio audience then votes to decide which of the two should remain in the competition. The winner locks their seat for the rest of the night and cannot be challenged again until the next episode.

== The Four around the world ==
Franchise that is currently airing
Franchise that is not currently airing, but is slated to return in the future
Franchise that has ended
Franchise that is in development
Franchise whose status is unknown

Country/Region	Local title	Network	Host(s)	Judges	Winners
Brazil	The Four Brasil	RecordTV	Xuxa Meneghel	Aline Wirley; João Marcello Bôscoli; Paulo Miklos; Leo Chaves	Season 1, 2019: Ivan Lima; Season 2, 2020: Alma Thomas
Greece; Cyprus	The Final Four	ANT1	Zeta Makripoulia	Eleni Foureira; Michalis Hatzigiannis; Michalis Kouinelis	Season 1, 2019: Sakis Karathanasis
Israel (original format)	The Four	Channel 13	Ester Rada	Dikla; Gilad Kahana; Marina Maximilian; Muki	Season 1, 2018: Sarit Avitan
Kazakhstan	Topjarǵan	Khabar	Madina Sadvakasova	Roza Rymbayeva; Renat Gaisin (1); Baller; Dastan Orazbekov (2)	Season 1, 2018: Akmaral Mamai; Season 2, 2019–20: Madi Syzdykov
Lithuania	Finalo ketvertas	LNK	Mantas Stonkus; Rolandas Mackevičius	Egidijus Dragūnas; Martynas Tyla; Vidas Bareikis	Season 1, 2019: Indrė Juodeikienė
Peru	Los cuatro finalistas	Latina Televisión	Cristian Rivero	Chyno Miranda; Deyvis Orosco; Eva Ayllón; Pedro Suárez-Vértiz	Season 1, 2018: Javier Arias; Season 2, 2018: José Gaona
Poland	The Four. Bitwa o sławę	Polsat	Natalia Szroeder	Natalia Nykiel; Kuba Badach; Igor Herbut	Season 1, 2020: Magdalena Krzemień
Romania	The Four – Cei 4	Antena 1	Macanache	Carla's Dreams; Antonia; Feli; Cheloo	Season 1, 2018: Vlad Musta
Russia	Успех	STS	Vera Brezhneva	Philipp Kirkorov; Nyusha; Slava KPSS	Season 1, 2017: Iv Nabiev
United States	The Four: Battle for Stardom	Fox	Fergie	Charlie Walk (1); Meghan Trainor (1–2); Sean Combs (1–2); DJ Khaled (1–2)	Season 1, Winter 2018: Evvie McKinney; Season 2, Summer 2018: James Graham

== See also ==
- List of reality television show franchises
- List of television show franchises
