= The Sandon School =

Location
- Molrams Lane; Chelmsford, Essex, CM3 7AQ; England; 51°42′57″N 0°30′59″E

Information
- Type: Academy
- Motto: "Vincit Qui Se Vincit" (He who conquers themself, conquers) and "Aiming Higher Together"
- Established: 1955
- Department for Education URN: 137240 Tables
- Ofsted: Reports
- Headteacher: Jon Pead
- Gender: Coeducational
- Age: 11 to 18
- Enrolment: 1218
- Houses: Blake; Glennie; Thompson; Russel
- Website: sandon.essex.sch.uk

The Sandon School is an 11-18 mixed comprehensive academy school of approximately 1250 students. It serves a rural area on the outskirts of Chelmsford, Essex, England, and previously specialised in Maths and Computing.

== History ==
The Sandon School opened in 1955 and became an academy in 2011.

The school has also had multiple sex offenders over time, with the latest conviction in March 2024 where a teacher who worked at the school from September 2020 to November 2020 was found guilty of possession of extreme pornography.

In March 2024 an Ofsted inspection found it to be a Requires Improvement school with a notable criticism being a lack of support for students with special educational needs and disabilities (SEND).

The school has a 25-hour teaching week. Jo Wincott, headmaster since 2004, retired in the summer of 2018. He has been succeeded by Andrew Weaver (2018–Present)

== Notable former pupils ==
- Bon Harris and Douglas McCarthy of Nitzer Ebb
- James Graham, singer and member of the boyband Stereo Kicks

== House System ==
The school also has a house system, in which the students take part in events and in-school activities in order to earn 'House points' for their houses.

House motto: "Many Branches, One Root"

The 4 houses conceive of:

- Blake
- Glennie
- Thompson
- Russel
