= The Final Four (TV series) =

- Genre: Talent show
- Created by: Elwin Vitztelly de Groot; Armoza Formats
- Presented by: Zeta Makripoulia
- Judges: Michalis Hatzigiannis; Eleni Foureira; Michalis Kouinelis
- Country of origin: Greece
- Original language: Greek
- No. of seasons: 1
- No. of episodes: 10

Production
- Production locations: Spata, Attica

Original release
- Network: ANT1
- Release: October 6 – December 8, 2019

The Final Four is a Greek television talent show based on an Israeli format The Four. It began airing on ANT1 on October 6, 2019.

== Production ==
The Final Four was often mentioned in January–February 2019 by the media as the new reality show on the Greek television. Even though no broadcaster had officially announced the show, ANT1 was the possible channel that would host the show. On June 13, 2019, it was announced with a trailer that ANT1 bought the rights for the show.

"The Final Four" has been featured in USA, Brazil, Peru, Russia, Lithuania, Romania, Kazakhstan and Israel, recording record-breaking recordings on TV shows, and is expected to be shown in Spain.

=== Auditions ===
The producer auditions of the first season started on July 4, 2019, and ended on September 4, 2019.

Summary of producer auditions
Location	Date(s)	Venue
(Greece) Athens	July 4, 2019	ANT1 MediaLab
(Greece) Athens	July 18, 2019	ANT1 MediaLab
(Greece) Athens	July 29, 2019	ANT1 MediaLab
(Greece) Athens	September 4, 2019	ANT1 MediaLab
(Greece) Thessaloniki	July 23, 2019	Holiday Inn Thessaloniki
(Cyprus) Nicosia	August 30, 2019	Cleopatra Hotel

== Format ==
Beginning with the final, "The Final Four" counts backwards for the winner. Four determined and competitive contestants are preparing to fight to defend and keep their place in the biggest musical battle. Opposite them will find many talented contestants who will try singing to ... detract from them and take their place in the stage of "The Final Four".

Every episode is a step closer to victory, and every week there is an overturn. Who makes it one of "The Final Four", to the win, and eventually win a contract with a big record company and also €50,000?

== Judges and host ==
Several artists were rumored to be part of the judging panel once ANT1 announced the show. Michalis Hatzigiannis was the first to be rumored as he is one of the biggest singers in both Cyprus and Greece. On the running were also Eleonora Zouganeli and George Levendis. After being a judge in third season on So You Think You Can Dance, Eleni Foureira was in the running for the judging panel. On September 9, 2019, ANT1 announced that Michalis Hatzigiannis, Eleni Foureira, Michalis Kouinelis and Nikos Moraitis will be the four judges of the show. After one Week, ANT1 announced that Moraitis will not be a judge and so will be only three judges.

After hosting the first two seasons of The Voice of Greece, Giorgos Liagkas was rumored to be the host of the show. A few days later, Zeta Makripoulia was unofficially confirmed to be the host of the show and on July 25, 2019, the broadcaster revealed that Makripoulia will be hosting the show.

== The Four ==
Key

- Winner
- Runner-up
- Third place

The Four
Episode	Group	Members			
Episode	Group	Seat 1	Seat 2	Seat 3	Seat 4
1	Original Four	Ksenia Dania	Manos Kokolakis	Maria Zouka	Sakis Karathanasis
1	2nd Four	Ksenia Dania	Manos Kokolakis	Giannis Lafis	Sakis Karathanasis
2	3rd Four	Barbara Argyrou	Manos Kokolakis	Giannis Lafis	Sakis Karathanasis
3	4th Four	Emmanouela Zambetaki	Manos Kokolakis	Giannis Lafis	Sakis Karathanasis
4	5th Four	Emmanouela Zambetaki	Manos Kokolakis	Giannis Lafis	Sakis Karathanasis
5	6th Four	Emmanouela Zambetaki	Aldion Zekio	Panagiotis Mpraikidis	Marianthi Papalamprou
6	7th Four	Emmanouela Zambetaki	Aldion Zekio	Giorgos Stefanou	Faidon Farid
7	8th Four	Emmanouela Zambetaki	Aldion Zekio	Panagiotis Rentetakos	Despoina Zikou
8	9th Four	Emmanouela Zambetaki	Aldion Zekio	Giorgos Paschalias	Despoina Zikou
9	Final Four	Emmanouela Zambetaki	Manos Kokolakis	Sakis Karathanasis	Barbara Argyrou
10	Final Four	Emmanouela Zambetaki	Manos Kokolakis	Sakis Karathanasis	Barbara Argyrou

== Artists ==
Key
– Artist started as "Original Four".
– Artist secured a spot and has remained in "The Four".
– Artist received "Yes" from the judges but lost in the duel.
– Artist received "No" from the judges.

All artists
Sakis Karathanasis	Ksenia Dania	Manos Kokolakis	Maria Zouka	Giannis Lafis
Barbara Argyrou	Emmanouela Zambetaki	Marianthi Papalamprou	Aldion Zekio	Panagiotis Mpraikidis
Faidon Farid	Giorgos Stefanou	Panagiotis Rentetakos	Despoina Zikou	Giorgos Paschalias
Evi Koulkouvini	Aggela Sidiropoulou	Pavlos Papasavas	Antonis Vlachos	Petros Gialamas
Nikos Georgakos	Peggy Ohilebo	Marianah Grindr	Tasos Vermis	Pedro Santana
Haris Mos	Orestis Ntokas	Kiana	Christina Koliandri	Spiros Xenidis
Leo Germanos	Alisia Kalafata	Mikaela Iakovou	Karolina Anastasiou	Nikos Ntalakas
Kostas Laggousis	Nikos Tsetinis	Stefany Loca	Ifigeneia Gontikaki	Stelia Gourloni
Andry Lagiou	Thekla Georgiou	Chara Sourla	Konstantinos Fileris	Alex Mits
Giannis Fakinos	Aileen	Tonia Konstantinou	Nadja Iarajouli	Andreas Archontakis
