= Michalis Hatzigiannis videography =

Greek Cypriot singer-songwriter Michalis Hatzigiannis has released two video albums and appeared in fifty-nine music videos, one film, one television program.

== Music videos ==
=== As lead artist ===
| "To Soma Pou Zitas" | 1999 | | dimitris sotas | |
| "Yparchoun Chrysopsara Edo?" | 1999 | | nikos soulis | |
| "Mono Sta Oneira" | 2000 | | Giannis Thomopoulos | |
| "Paraxeni giorti" | 2000 | | Maria Skoka | |
| "I Titli Tou Telous (Sleepy Hollow Mix)" | 2000 | | Vaggelis Kalaitzis | |
| "Ena Pedi Pou Perpataei Me Ta Heria" | 2001 | | Maria Skoka | |
| "Mono Gia 'Keini Mi Mou Les (Theatro Vrahon Melina Merkouri Live)" | 2001 | | Vaggelis Kalaitzis | |
| "Eisai Edo" | 2002 | | Christos Nikoleris; N-Orasis | |
| "Kapnos (Live)" | 2002 | | Christos Nikoleris; N-Orasis | |
| "Choris Anapnoi" | 2002 | | Christos Nikoleris; N-Orasis | |
| "To S' Agapo" | 2002 | | | |
| "Monos Mou" | 2003 | | Thanos Gomozias | |
| "Party" | 2003 | | Maria Skoka | None |
| "Gia Sena" | 2004 | | Christos Nikoleris; N-Orasis | |
| "Pou Einai I Agapi" | 2004 | | Kostas Kapetanidis | |
| "Afta Pou Tha 'Lega Se Sena" | 2005 | | Kostas Kapetanidis | |
| "Oneiro Zo" | 2005 | | Giorgos Gavalos | |
| "De Fevgo" | 2006 | | Manolis Tzirakis | |
| "Den Echo Chrono (Live)" | 2006 | | Giorgos Gavalos | |
| "Ola I Tipota" | 2006 | | Manolis Tzirakis | |
| "Na Eisai Ekei" | 2006 | | Giorgos Gavalos | |
| "Heria Psila" | 2007 | | Giorgos Gavalos | |
| "An Den Koitazo Esena" | 2007 | | Alekos Kyrarinis | |
| "Pio Poli" | 2007 | | Spiros Mavrokefalos | |
| "O Paradisos (Den Ftiahtike Gia Mas)" | 2007 | Despina Olympiou | | Alexandros Grammatopoulos |
| "Krata Me" | 2008 | | Giorgos Gavalos | |
| "Etsi Se Thelo" | 2008 | | Konstantinos Rigos | |
| "Emeis Oi Dio San Ena" | 2008 | | Konstantinos Rigos | |
| "Ola Tha Pane Kala" | 2008 | | White Room | |
| "Anapoda" | 2009 | | White Room | |
| "Par' Ta Ola Dika Sou" | 2009 | | Konstantinos Rigos | |
| "Anna" | 2009 | | White Room | |
| "Sti Leoforo Tis Agapis" | 2010 | | Maria Skoka | |
| "O Tilefonitis" | 2010 | | | |
| "Everyone Dance" | 2010 | | Katja Kuhl | |
| "To Kalokairi Mou" | 2010 | | White Room | |
| "To Kalitero Psema" | 2010 | | White Room | |
| "Mia Apo Ta Idia" | 2011 | | Alexandros Grammatopoulos | |
| "S' Agapo" | 2011 | | Simos Manganis | |
| "Aksizo" | 2011 | Ioulia Kallimani | | |
| "Tharros I Alitheia" | 2011 | | White Room; Konstantinos Rigos | |
| "Plai Plai" | 2012 | | Dimitri Platanias; Yiannis Papadakos | |
| "Treis Zoes" | 2012 | | Dimitri Platanias; Yiannis Papadakos | |
| "Se Enan Toicho" | 2012 | Midenistis | | John Mitropoulos |
| "I Agapi Dinamonei" | 2012 | 2013 | | Yiannis Papadakos |
| "Kati Dinato" | | 2013 | George Ant | |
| "Mesa Sou Vriskomai" | 2014 | | Giorgos Dedes | |
| "Poios Eimai Ego" | 2014 | | Sherif Francis | |
| "Tha Hatho Prin Figo" | 2015 | | Yannis Dimolitsas | |
| "Koita Me" | 2017 | | Yiannis Papadakos | |
| "Se Poion Na Po To S' Agapo" | 2017 | Dimitra Galani | | Michalis Papanikolaou |

=== As featured artist ===
| Title | Year | Other performer(s) | Director(s) | Ref. |
|---|---|---|---|---|
| "Love Love Love" | 2012 | Melina Mammas | Yiannis Papadakos | |

=== Guest appearances ===
| Title | Year | Performer(s) | Director(s) | Ref. |
|---|---|---|---|---|
| "Mia Glikia Melodia" | 2006 | Natasa Theodoridou | Manolis Tzirakis | |

== Video albums ==
| Title | Album details | Certifications | Ref. |
|---|---|---|---|
| "Live" | Released: March 2006; Label: Mercury; Formats: 2CDs, digital download, DVD | GRE: 3× Platinum | |
| "Zontana Sto Likavitto 2007–08" | Released: 4 December 2007; Label: M2; Formats: CD + DVD, digital download | GRE: 2xPlatinum | |

== Soundtrack contributions ==
| Title | Year | Song(s) | Director(s) | Notes |
|---|---|---|---|---|
| "R20" | 2004 | "Oti Ki An Po" | Panagiotis Kravvas; Lakis Lazopoulos | |
| "Mia Melissa Ton Avgousto" | 2007 | "Na Eisai Ekei" | Thodoris Atheridis | |
| "Ola Tha Pane Kala" | 2009 | "Ola Tha Pane Kala" | Giannis Xanthopoulos | |
| "Loafing and Camouflage: Sirens at Land" | 2011 | "Aksizo" | Nikos Perakis | Performed with Ioulia Kallimani |
| "Tsarli" | 2019 | "I Kaliteri Mou Fili" | Thanasis Tsaltabasis | |

== Film ==
| Film | Year | Director | Character | Description | Ref. |
|---|---|---|---|---|---|
| Ola Tha Pane Kala | 2009 | Giannis Xanthopoulos | Actor | Cameo appearance | |

== Television ==
| Television show | Year | Character | Description | Ref. |
|---|---|---|---|---|
| The Final Four | 2019 | Himself | Judge | |
