= The Four Brasil =

Brazilian reality TV music competition

- Genre: Talent show
- Created by: Elwin Vitztelly de Groot; Armoza Formats
- Based on: The Four
- Directed by: Marcelo Amiky
- Presented by: Xuxa Meneghel
- Judges: Aline Wirley; João Marcello Bôscoli; Leo Chaves; Paulo Miklos
- Country of origin: Brazil
- Original language: Portuguese
- No. of seasons: 2
- No. of episodes: 16

Production
- Camera setup: Multiple-camera
- Running time: 105 minutes
- Production company: Endemol Shine

Original release
- Network: RecordTV
- Release: 6 February 2019 – 29 April 2020

Related
- The Four (franchise)

The Four Brasil is a Brazilian reality television music competition based on an Israeli format called The Final Four. It is hosted by Xuxa Meneghel and originally judged by Aline Wirley, João Marcello Bôscoli and Leo Chaves, with Paulo Miklos replacing Leo on the panel in season two. The series premiered Wednesday, 6 February 2019 at 10:30 p.m. (BRT / AMT) on RecordTV. The winner is awarded a R$300.000 cash prize.

== Series overview ==
Season	First aired	Last aired	Winner	Runner-up	Other finalists
1	6 February 2019	27 March 2019	Ivan Lima	Vivian Lemos	Leo Mahuad
1	6 February 2019	27 March 2019	Ivan Lima	Vivian Lemos	Nega
2	8 March 2020	29 April 2020	Alma Thomas	Lucas Degasperi	Sabrina Meirels
2	8 March 2020	29 April 2020	Alma Thomas	Lucas Degasperi	Ana Clemesha

== Season synopses ==
Winners and runners-up are indicated in gold and silver, respectively.

=== Season 1 (2019) ===
The first season of The Four Brasil premiered on 6 February 2019, and concluded on 27 March 2019. After eight episodes, Ivan Lima was announced as the winner of the season, with Vivian Lemos as the runner-up. The final group of "The Four" also included Leo Mahuad and Nega.

The Four
Episode	Group	Members			
Episode	Group	Seat 1	Seat 2	Seat 3	Seat 4
1	Original Four	Stanya	Manso	Bruna Oliver	Erik Moraes
1	2nd Four	Rully	Manso	Arthur Olliver	Erik Moraes
2	3rd Four	Rully	Manso	Victor Filgueira	Leo Mahuad
3	4th Four	Nega	Manso	Kacá Novais	Leo Mahuad
4	5th Four	Nega	Santaella	Tay Rodriguez	Leo Mahuad
5	6th Four	Nega	Santaella	Ivan Lima	Leo Mahuad
6	Final Four	Nega	Vivian Lemos	Ivan Lima	Leo Mahuad
7	Final Four	Nega	Vivian Lemos	Ivan Lima	Leo Mahuad
8	Final Four	Nega	Vivian Lemos	Ivan Lima	Leo Mahuad

=== Season 2 (2020) ===
The second season of The Four Brasil premiered on 8 March 2020, and concluded on 29 April 2020. After eight episodes, Alma Thomas was announced as the winner of the season, with Lucas Degasperi as the runner-up. The final group of "The Four" also included Sabrina Meirels and Ana Clemesha.

The Four
Episode	Group	Members			
Episode	Group	Seat 1	Seat 2	Seat 3	Seat 4
1	Original Four	Jezrrel	Gaby Littré	João Terra	Alma Thomas
1	2nd Four	Jezrrel	Marina Araújo	Victor Mota	Alma Thomas
2	3rd Four	Jezrrel	John Bianchi	Victor Mota	Alma Thomas
3	4th Four	Jezrrel	Fabiola Fisher	Thais Kiwi	Alma Thomas
4	5th Four	Jezrrel	Flavia Gabê	Thais Kiwi	Alma Thomas
5	6th Four	Jezrrel	Romero Ribeiro	Thais Kiwi	Alma Thomas
6	7th Four	Ana Clemesha	Renan de Lucca	Thais Kiwi	Alma Thomas
7	8th Four	Ana Clemesha	Graziela Medori	Thais Kiwi	Alma Thomas
8	Final Four	Ana Clemesha	Lucas Degasperi	Sabrina Meirels	Alma Thomas

== Ratings and reception ==
=== Brazilian ratings ===
All numbers are in points and provided by Kantar Ibope Media.

Season	Timeslot (BRT)	Premiered		Ended		TV season	SP viewers (in points)	Source
Season	Timeslot (BRT)	Date	Viewers (in points)	Date	Viewers (in points)	TV season	SP viewers (in points)	Source
1	Wednesday 10:30 p.m.^{1}	6 February 2019	7.4	27 March 2019	6.2	2018–19	6.70	
2	Wednesday 10:30 p.m.^{1}	8 March 2020	6.4	29 April 2020	3.7	2019–20	4.19	

- ^Note 1: The first two episodes of season 2 aired on Sunday at 6:00 p.m.
- Each point represents a specific number of households in São Paulo.
  - 2019: 73.015 households.
  - 2020: 74.987 households.
