= Sharaya J =

American rapper

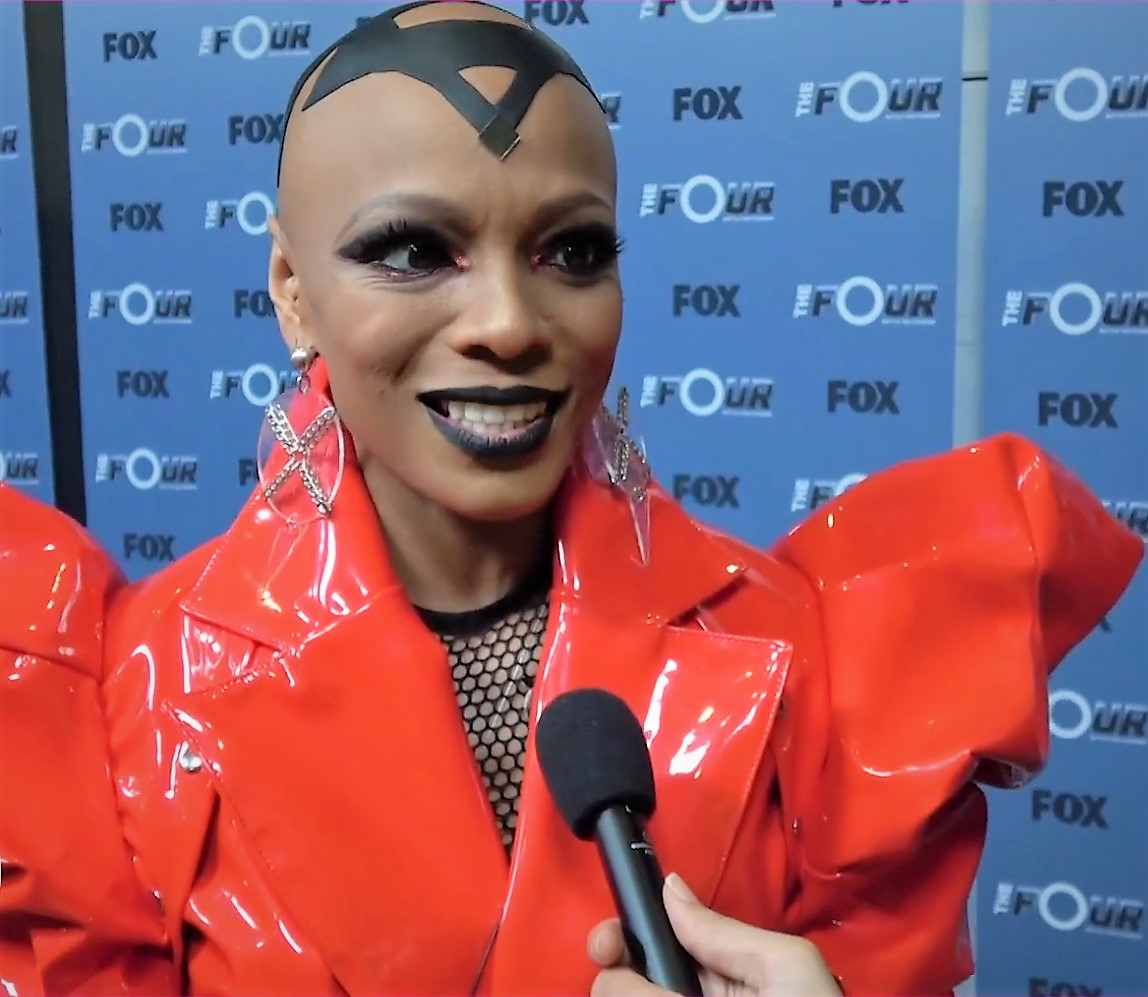
- Sharaya J interviewed by Dulce Osuna in 2018

Background information
- Born: Sharaya Howell; January 17, 1984 (age 42)
- Origin: Honolulu, Hawaii, U.S.
- Genres: East Coast hip hop, R&B
- Occupations: Rapper; choreographer
- Years active: 2001–present
- Label: Goldmind
- Website: SharayaJ.com

Sharaya Howell (born January 17, 1984), known professionally as Sharaya J, is an American rapper and choreographer. She is known for her singles "BANJI" and "Smash Up the Place," as well as for being signed to Missy Elliott's label The Goldmind Inc. Prior to her work as a musician, she worked as a hip-hop choreographer and urban screenplay writer. On April 17, 2017, she released her debut mixtape, Dope Product.

== Early life and career beginnings ==
Born to a working mother and a father who served as one-fifth of hip-hop group Double XX Posse, Howell began her career as a hip-hop choreographer. She was featured as a dancer in French singer Mylène Farmer's 2006 tour, Avant que l'ombre... à Bercy. Her work caught the attention of high-profile musicians Diddy, Ciara, Alicia Keys, Jay-Z, The-Dream, Rihanna, and earned her cameo spots on each artists' music videos (Alicia Keys' "Teenage Love Affair", The-Dream's "Shawty Is a 10"). She later went on to work with other top choreographers, Laurieann Gibson, Tanisha Scott, Fatima Robinson, Hi-Hat, and Jamaica Craft (formerly one-third of The Goldmind's act So Def).

Howell also served as a dancer for Step Up 2: The Streets and Step Up 3D. In addition, she worked as a screenplay writer and executive producer for the short, The Real T.

== Music career ==
In January 2010, Howell signed to Missy Elliott's label The Goldmind Inc. and was introduced by Elliott at the New York venue Crash Mansion. Later that year, she released the Souldiggaz–produced "Green Light", featuring vocals by Elliott, and became part of Elliott's sold-out European tour. On March 2, 2013, her single "BANJI" was released. The song features additional vocals by Missy Elliott and production by DJ Jayhood. A promotional music video for the single was released via her official YouTube channel two days following its official release.

On September 11, 2013, Howell was featured as magazine VIBE Vixen's "rapper to watch." The magazine also officially premiered Howell’s new music video, "Smash Up the Place"/"Snatch Yo Wigs," directed by Missy Elliott. In March 2014, Howell, alongside mentor Missy Elliott, were confirmed to be features on Faith Evans' sixth studio album, Incomparable, on a record titled "I Deserve It". In June 2014, she previewed her forthcoming single "Shut It Down" via a T by Alexander Wang campaign, featuring production by Aaron "Dboy" Monroe and Missy Elliott, and cameo appearances by Behati Prinsloo, Derek Blasberg and Chris Kattan, who reprised his role as the former Saturday Night Live character, Mango.

On September 29, 2014, VIBE Vixen premiered the visual to Howell’s single "Takin' It No More", which in turn samples mentor Missy Elliott's Aaliyah-dedicated single, "Take Away".

In 2016, Howell split terms with The Goldmind, and launched her own production company, Banji Entertainment LLC. Under the Brooklyn-based imprint, Howell released "Big".

In July 2018, Howell joined music competition program The Four: Battle for Stardom, where she attained the title for longest seat holder and runner-up of season 2. Prior to filming, she battled stage 2 breast cancer, which was mentioned on the program's finale.

In late 2018, Howell co-wrote and is a featured artist on "Strip", a song on Little Mix's fifth studio album, LM5.

== Discography ==
=== Mixtapes ===
| Title | Mixtape details |
|---|---|
| Dope Product | Released: 2017; Label: Self-released; Formats: Streaming |

=== Singles ===
==== As lead artist ====
| Title | Year | Peak chart positions | | Album |
| Title | Year | US | US R&B | Album |
|---|---|---|---|---|
| "BANJI" (featuring Missy Elliott) | 2013 | — | — | Non-album singles |
| "Smash Up the Place" | 2013 | — | — | Non-album singles |
| "Takin' It No More" | 2014 | — | — | Non-album singles |
| "Shut It Down" | 2014 | — | — | Non-album singles |
| "Big" | 2016 | — | — | Dope Product |
| "New Wave" | 2017 | — | — | Dope Product |
| "Go Sis" | 2018 | — | — | The Four Performances |
| "Say Less (Be Quiet)" | 2018 | — | — | The Four Performances |
| "Stir Fry" | 2018 | — | — | The Four Performances |
| "Mama Said Knock You Out" | 2018 | — | — | The Four Performances |
| "Go Raya" | 2018 | — | — | The Four Performances |
| "I Don't F**k With You" | 2018 | — | — | The Four Performances |
| "Juicy" | 2018 | — | — | The Four Performances |
| "Banji Trip" | 2019 | — | — | Non-album singles |
| "NuNu" | 2020 | — | — | Non-album singles |
| "Wrong Time Wrong Place" (with Shi XI) | 2021 | — | — | Non-album singles |

==== As featured artist ====
| Title | Year | Peak chart positions | | Album |
| Title | Year | US | US R&B | Album |
|---|---|---|---|---|
| "I Deserve It" (Faith Evans featuring Missy Elliott & Sharaya J) | 2014 | — | 19 | Incomparable |
| "Dance" (feat. Candice Boyd, Kate Stewart, Sharaya J) | 2020 | — | — | An Invitation to the Cookout |

=== Guest appearances ===
List of non-single guest appearances, with other performing artists, showing year released and album name
| Title | Year | Other artist(s) | Album |
|---|---|---|---|
| "Strip" | 2018 | Little Mix | LM5 |

== Awards and nominations ==
| Year | Award | Category | Nominated work | Result |
|---|---|---|---|---|
| 2018 | Talent Recap Fan Choice Awards | Breakout Talent Show Star | The Four: Battle For Stardom | Nominated |
