= Stereo Kicks =

English-Irish boy band

- Origin: London, England
- Genres: Pop, R&B
- Years active: 2014–2015
- Label: James Grant Music
- Past members: Barclay Beales; Chris Leonard; Tom Mann; James Graham; Reece Bibby; Jake Sims; Casey Johnson; Charlie Jones

Stereo Kicks were an English-Irish boy band who were formed in 2014 as part of the eleventh series of The X Factor; they were the twelfth contestant eliminated. Stereo Kicks consisted of: James Graham, Jake Sims, Chris Leonard, Charlie Jones, Casey Johnson, Barclay Beales, Reece Bibby, and Tom Mann. Their debut single "Love Me So" was released on 21 June 2015 and charted at number 31 on the UK Singles Chart. However, just a month later, having been together under a year, they announced they were disbanding due to their failure to land a record deal.

== History ==
=== 2014: Formation and The X Factor ===
All eight members of Stereo Kicks originally auditioned as soloists for series 11 of The X Factor in front of judges Simon Cowell, Louis Walsh, Cheryl Fernandez-Versini and Mel B, but were all rejected at the bootcamp stage. They were formed by the judges because they felt they were rejects that they could work with. The group first sang together at bootcamp within hours of being put together; they performed a cover of the Snow Patrol song "Run". They received a standing ovation from all four judges with Cowell saying that they were one of the best boybands they had ever had on the show. As a result, they got through straight to the judges' houses stage, mentored by Walsh. At that stage they sang Justin Timberlake's "Mirrors" and later got sent to the live shows. The fans suggested names through the ITV website; they received over 46,000 entries. Stereo Kicks' reception has been very favourable with Cowell saying they were "one of the best [groups] ever [to feature on the show]" and the public comparing them to be "as good as One Direction" and their performance of "Run" reached 1 million views on The X Factor's YouTube channel a week after its upload on 28 September. Initially called the "New Boy Band", they later held a poll on the website to determine a new name and "Stereo Kicks" was chosen.

Stereo Kicks performed Katy Perry's "Roar" in the first week of the live shows. They landed in the sing-off during week two with Chloe Jasmine, but were saved when Walsh, Mel B and Cowell opted to send Jasmine home. Later that same night, during The Xtra Factor, Sarah-Jane Crawford asked Walsh about them. He said, live on television, that he "never wanted eight boys in the band", claimed that Cowell was the one who had put them together, and generally insinuated that he wanted to cut several members from the band. During several interviews between the week 2 results and the week 3 performance, Stereo Kicks mentioned how disappointed they were that their mentor did not seem to want them, and there were rumours that the band would be split up during the week 3 live performances. These rumours turned out to be false, and Cowell made Walsh apologise to the band after their week 3 performance. Cowell also jokingly offered Stereo Kicks the opportunity to be mentored by him instead of Walsh.

They were in the sing-off again in week 4 against Lola Saunders. With Walsh and Mel B opting to save them, the result went to deadlock and Saunders was eliminated as the contestant with fewest public votes. With the eliminations of Blonde Electra and Overload Generation in week 1 and Only The Young in week 7, Stereo Kicks became Walsh's last remaining act in the competition. In the quarter-final, they were in the bottom two with Lauren Platt. The result went to deadlock, and Stereo Kicks were eliminated. Following their elimination, Walsh told Digital Spy on 3 December that he had believed they would last "two more weeks" in the competition. He stated that he would not be able to manage the group following The X Factor even if he had wanted to, since all the X Factor contestants had already signed to a management company, James Grant Management, prior to the live shows.

==== Performances during the show ====
The X Factor performances and results (2014)
Stage	Song	Theme	Result
Six-chair challenge (bootcamp)	"Run"	Free choice	Through to judges' houses
Judges' houses	"Mirrors"	Free choice	Through to live shows
Live week 1	"Roar"	Number ones	Safe (11th)
Live week 2	"The Boys of Summer"	80's night	Bottom three (12th)
Live week 2	"I'll Stand by You"	Free choice	Safe (3/4 majority vote)
Live week 3	"Let It Be" / "Hey Jude"	Saturday night at the movies	Safe (6th)
Live week 4	"Everybody (Backstreet's Back)"	Fright Night (Halloween)	Bottom two (9th)
Live week 4	"Perfect"	Free choice	Safe (Deadlock)
Live week 5	"You Are Not Alone"	Michael Jackson vs. Queen	Safe (4th)
Live week 6	"Mack the Knife"	Big band	Safe (5th)
Live week 7	"Don't Let the Sun Go Down on Me"	Whitney Houston vs. Elton John	Safe (4th)
Quarter-Final	"Just the Way You Are"	Song chosen by Tulisa	Bottom two (5th)
Quarter-Final	"Run"	Song chosen by the public	Bottom two (5th)
Quarter-Final	"I Won't Give Up"	Free choice	Eliminated (fifth place)

=== 2015: Debut single and split ===
On 20 April 2015, Stereo Kicks announced their debut single "Love Me So". Written by Mann and released on 21 June 2015, it charted at number 31 on the UK Singles Chart and was the number-one physical single the same week. The single also charted in Ireland where it entered and peaked at number 80 on the IRMA Charts.

On 18 July 2015, after just eleven months together, the band announced via their Facebook page that, having failed to land a major record deal, they would be disbanding. Their final performance together saw them headlining Thorpe Park's Island Beats event the following week.

== Members ==
=== Barclay Beales ===
Barclay Beales (born 27 August 1995) is from Devon. He auditioned for the tenth series of The X Factor in 2013 and got eliminated in the Bootcamp stage by Louis Walsh. He used to yodel. He came back for series 11, performing Chris Isaak's "Wicked Game" in his Room Audition and Robbie Williams's "Angels" at the Arena.

=== Chris Leonard ===
Chris Leonard (born 3 September 1995) is from County Meath, Ireland. He also auditioned for the tenth series of The X Factor and got eliminated in the Bootcamp stage by Gary Barlow, but as part of the boyband Out of the Blue; because they forgot their lyrics. He came back for series 11, but as a soloist. None of his auditions were broadcast.

=== Tom Mann ===
Tom Mann (born 3 November 1993) is a football coach from Southampton. Like Beales, he also auditioned for the series 10 of The X Factor but was eliminated in the bootcamp stage by Louis Walsh. Mann came back for series 11. He sang an original song at the arena that he wrote the day after Walsh eliminated him, but Simon Cowell stopped him (then getting a good reaction by the audience) and said: "I think if you were ugly you never would have got that reaction", Walsh himself and Cheryl told Cowell to give him a second chance and then Mann performed an acoustic version of the Backstreet Boys' "I Want It That Way" and got three yeses. He was the oldest member of the group. Mann has since worked as a songwriter and producer for other artists.

=== James Graham ===
James Graham (born 12 October 1996) is from Essex. He performed James Morrison's "You Give Me Something" in his Room Audition, getting a very good reaction from the judges, and Bonnie Raitt's "I Can't Make You Love Me" at the Arena; Mel B said that his performance was "soulful and sexy.” He won the second season of The Four: Battle for Stardom and was awarded a recording contract with Republic Records.

=== Reece Bibby ===
Reece Bibby (born 13 August 1998) is from Accrington. He auditioned at the Room with an acoustic rendition of Disclosure's "Latch" and wowed the judges. He went on to become a member of the band New Hope Club, who are signed to Steady Records/Hollywood Records and have had international success.

=== Jake Sims ===
Jake Sims (born 26 November 1994) is from Bristol. He sang Stevie Wonder's "Superstition" in his Room Audition, with his little sister present, and Arctic Monkeys' "When the Sun Goes Down" at the Arena.

=== Casey Johnson ===
Casey Johnson (born 1 May 1995) is from London. He performed Olly Murs' "Please Don't Let Me Go" in his room audition In May 2016, Johnson joined the band Union J, but later left in April 2017. He also starred in the E4 series, Stage School.

=== Charlie Jones ===
Charlie Jones (born 20 December 1999) is from Kent. He sang One Direction's "Little Things" in his Room Audition, and the Spice Girls' "Wannabe" at the Arena, stunning the judges and the audience. He is also well known for his viral song on YouTube, "Belieber for Life". He was the youngest member of the band. He became a member of the 5-piece band Over Atlantic, who were active from 2016 to 2018.

== Discography ==
Singles

Year	Title	Peak chart positions	
Year	Title	UK	IRE
2015	"Love Me So"	31	80
