= The Four: Battle for Stardom season 1 =

The Four: Battle for Stardom
- Season 1
- Hosted by: Fergie
- Coaches: Charlie Walk^{1}; Sean Combs; Meghan Trainor; DJ Khaled
- Winner: Evvie McKinney
- Runner-up: Candice Boyd

Release
- Original network: FOX
- Original release: January 4 – February 8, 2018

Season chronology
- Next → Season 2

The first season of The Four: Battle for Stardom premiered on Fox on January 4, 2018. Fergie hosted the show, while Sean Combs, DJ Khaled, Meghan Trainor and Charlie Walk were judges. Prior to the season finale, Walk withdrew from the show following sexual assault allegations against him.

On February 8, 2018, the winner was announced as 20-year-old Evvie McKinney from Memphis, Tennessee, who was signed to Republic Records and named iHeartRadio's "On the Verge" artist.

The first season also propelled the future entertainment careers of Vincint Cannady, Zhavia Ward and Tim Johnson Jr.

== The Four ==
Key:

– Challenger against "The Four" won and secured a seat as a new member.
– Member of "The Four" did not perform.
– Member of "The Four" won the challenge and secured their seat.
– Member of "The Four" lost the challenge and was eliminated.
– Challenger lost their challenge, and was originally eliminated, but received a second chance via #TheFourComeback.
– Comeback Artist lost their opportunity to challenge one of "The Four" when another comeback artist defeated them.
– Not in the competition.
– Final member of “The Four”
* – Original member of "The Four"

Artists	Episodes							
Artists	1	2	3	4	5		Finale	
Artists	1	2	3	4	Part 1^{1}	Part 2	Part 1	Part 2
Evvie McKinney					WIN	N/A	SAFE	WINNER
Candice Boyd		WIN	OUT		SAVE	WIN	SAFE	RUNNER -UP
Vincint Cannady					WIN	N/A	OUT	
Zhavia Ward	WIN	IN	SAFE	OUT	SAVE	WIN	OUT	
Tim Johnson Jr.			WIN	IN	IN	OUT		
Nick Harrison				WIN	IN	OUT		
Ash Minor*	IN	OUT			SAVE	LOSE		
Saeed Renaud	WIN	OUT			SAVE	LOSE		
Kendyle Paige				WIN	OUT			
Jason Warrior		WIN	SAFE	SAFE	OUT			
Rell Jerv			WIN	OUT				
Cheyenne Elliot		WIN	OUT					
Lex Lu*	SAFE	OUT						
Blair Perkins*	OUT							
Elanese Lansen	OUT							

1. On January 29, a few days before episode 5, it was announced that via The hashtag #TheFourComeback, Zhavia, Ash Minor, Candice Boyd, and Saeed Renaud received the most tweets and retweets, and would get another opportunity to earn a seat. During Part 1, they were officially brought back onto the show

== Challenge Episodes ==
Key:

– Artist secured a spot and has remained in "The Four".
– Artist won their challenge, but was eventually eliminated from the competition.
– Artist was eliminated from the competition.
– Artist lost their challenge, and was originally eliminated, but received a second chance via #TheFourComeback.

=== Week 1 (January 4) ===
- Group performance: "Can't Stop the Feeling!"

Starting lineup of The Four
Artist	Age	Hometown	Starting seat
Lex Lu	32	Los Angeles, California	Put in seat 1
Ash Minor	23	Ipswich, Australia	Put in seat 2
Elanese Lansen	22	Boca Raton, Florida	Put in seat 3
Blair Perkins	25	Los Angeles, California	Put in seat 4

Artist performances on the first episode
Order	Artist	Age	Hometown	Song	Judges' verdict	Walk	Trainor	Combs	Khaled
1	Tyler Griffin	24	North Bergen, New Jersey	"Talk Dirty"	Eliminated				
2	Zhavia	16	Los Angeles, California	"Location"	Advanced				
3	Anthony Hall	28	Delray Beach, Florida	"Feel It Still"	Eliminated				
4	Illakriss	21	Dallas, Texas	"Let's Groove"	Advanced				
5	Valentina Cytrynowicz	19	Los Angeles, California	"Green Light"	Eliminated				
6	Saeed Renaud	37	Brooklyn, New York	"Run to You"	Advanced				

Challenge performances on the first episode
Order	Artist	Song	Challenge result
2.1	Elanese Lansen	"Échame la Culpa"	Eliminated
2.2	Zhavia	"Unforgettable"	Put in seat 3
4.1	Lex Lu	"Wild Thoughts"	Safe
4.2	Illakriss	"Special Delivery"	Eliminated
6.1	Blair Perkins	"Stay with Me"	Eliminated
6.2	Saeed Renaud	"Love Me Again"	Put in seat 4

=== Week 2 (January 11) ===
- Group performance: "Free Your Mind"

Artist performances on the second episode
Order	Artist	Age	Hometown	Song	Judges' verdict	Walk	Trainor	Combs	Khaled
1	Candice Boyd	27	Rancho Cucamonga, California	"I'm Goin' Down"	Advanced				
2	Stevie Brock	27	North Hollywood, California	"Sugar"	Eliminated				
3	Cheyenne Elliott	23	New York City, New York	"Wings"	Advanced				
4	Cocoa Sarai	28	Brooklyn, New York	"Jealous"	Eliminated				
5	Kayla Ember	18	St. Petersburg, Florida	"Bad at Love"	Eliminated				
6	Jason Warrior	22	Chicago, Illinois	"Love Me Now"	Advanced				

Challenge performances on the second episode
Order	Artist	Song	Challenge result
1.1	Ash Minor	"Adorn"	Eliminated
1.2	Candice Boyd	"Dangerous Woman"	Put in seat 2
3.1	Lex Lu	"Bad and Boujee"	Eliminated
3.1	Cheyenne Elliott	"Too Good at Goodbyes"	Put in seat 1
6.1	Saeed Renaud	"Superstition"	Eliminated
6.2	Jason Warrior	"Radioactive"	Put in seat 4

=== Week 3 (January 18) ===
Note: This is the first time that all four members have been challenged.

- Group performance: "Bang Bang"

Artist performances on the third episode
Order	Artist	Age	Hometown	Song	Judges' verdict	Walk	Trainor	Combs	Khaled
1	Rell Jerv	24	Wilmington, Delaware	"Pools" (Original Song)	Advanced				
2	Sean Cavaliere	18	Los Angeles, California	"Stitches"	Eliminated				
3	Jefferson Clay	23	Austin, Texas	"Better Man"	Advanced				
4	Nicole Boggs	30	Nashville, Tennessee	"Like I'm Gonna Lose You"	Advanced				
5	Tim Johnson Jr.	18	Philadelphia, Pennsylvania	"Let's Stay Together"	Advanced				

Challenge performances on the third episode
Order	Artist	Song	Challenge result
1.1	Cheyenne Elliot	"Wrecking Ball"	Eliminated
1.2	Rell Jerv	"I Own It" (Original Song)	Put in seat 1
3.1	Jason Warrior	"Love on the Brain"	Safe
3.2	Jefferson Clay	"Ignition"	Eliminated
4.1	Zhavia	"Killing Me Softly with His Song"	Safe
4.2	Nicole Boggs	"Praying"	Eliminated
5.1	Candice Boyd	"Here"	Eliminated
5.2	Tim Johnson Jr.	"All I Want"	Put in seat 2

=== Week 4 (January 25) ===
- Group performance: "Finesse"

Artist performances on the fourth episode
Order	Artist	Age	Hometown	Song	Judges' verdict	Walk	Trainor	Combs	Khaled
1	Nicolina	22	Orlando, Florida	"Don't Let Me Down"	Eliminated				
2	RaVaughn	30	Carson, California	"Sorry Not Sorry"	Advanced				
3	Edi Callier	22	Covington, Georgia	"Jealous"	Eliminated				
4	Nick Harrison	28	Sherman Oaks, California	"Bad Boy For Life"	Advanced				
5	Josh Wyper	30	Vancouver, Canada	"Tennessee Whiskey"	Eliminated				
6	Kendyle Paige	20	Circleville, New York	"Me, Myself & I"	Advanced				

Challenge performances on the fourth episode
Order	Artist	Song	Challenge result
2.1	Jason Warrior	"Titanium"	Safe
2.2	RaVaughn	"Have You Ever?"	Eliminated
4.1	Rell Jerv	"Feeling Alright" (Original Song)	Eliminated
4.2	Nick Harrison	"Survival of the Fittest"	Put in seat 1
6.1	Zhavia	"Diamonds"	Eliminated
6.2	Kendyle Paige	"PILLOWTALK"	Put in seat 3

=== Week 5 (February 1) ===
This week featured two distinct parts. The first part was the same format as the previous weeks. However, in the second part, four previously eliminated artists received an opportunity to earn a chance to challenge a member of "The Four" another time.

- Group performance: "I Gotta Feeling" (With Fergie)

==== Part 1: New Artist Challenges ====
Artist performances on the fifth episode
Order	Artist	Age	Hometown	Song	Judges' verdict	Walk	Trainor	Combs	Khaled
1	Vincint Cannady	26	Philadelphia, Pennsylvania	"Magic"	Advanced				
2	Evvie McKinney	20	Memphis, Tennessee	"Rise Up"	Advanced				

Challenge performances on the fifth episode
Order	Artist	Song	Challenge result
1.1	Jason Warrior	"Ordinary People"	Eliminated
1.2	Vincint Cannady	"Sittin' Up In My Room"	Put in seat 4
2.1	Kendyle Paige	"Stay"	Eliminated
2.2	Evvie McKinney	"I Never Loved a Man the Way I Love You"	Put In Seat 3

==== Part 2: Comeback Artist Performances ====
Throughout the run of the season, viewers voted for their favorite eliminated members of "The Four" on Twitter using the hashtag #TheFourComeback and another hashtag with the artist's first name. On January 29, FOX posted a video on the show's YouTube channel, which announced that Ash Minor, Candice Boyd, Saeed Renaud, and Zhavia had been the top four vote-getters and would be returning to the competition.

In Part 2, the four comeback artists were put into two pairs. Each pair had to battle for the judges' unanimous vote to move on. Once the judges picked which of the two comeback artists would move on, each winner challenged one of the remaining members of "The Four."

Comeback Artist Battle Results
Order	Artist	Song	Result
3.1	Saeed Renaud	"All My Life"	Eliminated
3.2	Candice Boyd	"Love"	Advanced
4.1	Ash Minor	"When I Was Your Man"	Eliminated
4.2	Zhavia	"Bodak Yellow"	Advanced

Comeback Artist Challenge Performance Results
Order	Artist	Song	Result
5.1	Nick Harrison	"All The Way Up"	Eliminated
5.2	Candice Boyd	"Ex-Factor	Put in Seat 1
6.1	Tim Johnson Jr.	"Earned It (Fifty Shades of Grey)"	Eliminated
6.2	Zhavia	"Say Something"	Put in Seat 2

== Finale ==
=== Week 6 (February 8) ===
- Group performance: "The Edge of Glory"

==== Part 1: Head-to-Head Battles ====
In Part 1, the finalists each performed two songs. For the first song, each finalist performed in hopes of winning over the audience. After performing, the audience voted on their favorite performance, and the finalist with the most votes earned the power to choose who they wanted to battle against in the head-to-head challenge. For their second song, each selected pair went head-to-head. The judges picked a winner from each pair to move on to the final battle.

Selection Power Performances
Order	Artist	Song	Result	Opponent
1	Candice Boyd	"Don't Speak"	Did not receive	Vincint
2	Evvie McKinney	"Proud Mary"	Selected Zhavia	Zhavia
3	Vincint Cannady	"Creep"	Did not receive	Candice
4	Zhavia	"One Dance"	Did not receive	Evvie

Second Battle Results
Order	Artist	Song	Result
3.1	Zhavia	"Man Down"	Eliminated
3.2	Evvie Mckinney	"Ain't No Sunshine"	Advanced
4.1	Vincint Cinnady	"Locked Out of Heaven"	Eliminated
4.2	Candice Boyd	"I Have Nothing"	Advanced

Non-Competition Performances
Order	Artist	Song
6.1	French Montana	"Unforgettable" & "Famous"

==== Part 2: The Final Battle ====
For the final battle, the two finalists performed once more for the votes of the judges. The winner of this battle would be crowned the winner of The Four.

Final Head-to-head Performance Results
Order	Artist	Song	Result
9	Evvie McKinney	"Glory"	Winner
10	Candice Boyd	"Stay"	Runner-Up

== Artists who appeared on previous shows ==
- Jason Warrior was on the eleventh season of The Voice and reached the live playoffs, but was eliminated. He later appeared on the nineteenth season of American Idol, where he made the Top 24.
- Ash Minor from Brisbane, Australia, made the top 12 on X Factor Australia in 2012 under his real name (Adil Memon).
- Elanese Lansen was a contestant on the American version of The X Factor in 2013. There is no footage of her performances, but there is an interview package on YouTube entitled "Yes, I Made It!"
- Blair Perkins previously auditioned for the twelfth season of American Idol and made it to Hollywood Week.

== Famous Relations ==
- Evvie McKinney is the younger sister of Gedeon McKinney, who finished in the top 16 of the fifth season of American Idol.
- Cheyenne Elliott is the granddaughter of Dionne Warwick, who later competed on The Masked Singer as the Mouse, being eliminated in the second round.

== Ratings ==
Episode		Original airdate	Time slot (ET)	Viewers (in millions)	Adults (18–49)		Source
Episode		Original airdate	Time slot (ET)	Viewers (in millions)	Rating	Share	Source
1	"Week One"	January 4, 2018	Thursday 8:00 p.m.	3.75	1.2	4	
2	"Week Two"	January 11, 2018	Thursday 8:00 p.m.	3.29	1.1	4	
3	"Week Three"	January 18, 2018	Thursday 8:00 p.m.	3.47	1.1	4	
4	"Week Four"	January 25, 2018	Thursday 8:00 p.m.	3.69	1.2	5	
5	"Week Five"	February 1, 2018	Thursday 8:00 p.m.	3.76	1.3	5	
6	"Week Six"	February 8, 2018	Thursday 8:00 p.m.	4.03	1.3	5	
