= The Four Brasil season 2 =

The Four Brasil
- Season 2
- Hosted by: Xuxa Meneghel
- Coaches: Aline Wirley; João Marcello Bôscoli; Paulo Miklos
- Winner: Alma Thomas
- Runner-up: Lucas Degasperi

Release
- Original network: RecordTV
- Original release: March 8 – April 29, 2020

Season chronology
- ← Previous; Season 1

The second season of The Four Brasil, hosted by Xuxa Meneghel and judged by Aline Wirley, João Marcello Bôscoli and new judge Paulo Miklos, premiered on Sunday, March 8, 2020, at 6:00 p.m. / 5:00 p.m. (BRT / AMT) on RecordTV. The season was previously slated to premiere on Friday, February 14, 2020, at 10:30 p.m. Starting on week 3, the show moved back to the first season's timeslot on Wednesdays at 10:30 p.m. due to low ratings.

This season was originally scheduled to last for 10 weeks. However, on March 17, 2020, RecordTV suspended taping for all of their shows due to the coronavirus pandemic in Brazil. As a result, the four contestants remaining at the end of the last recorded episode (week 8 episode) automatically became the Final Four of the season.

On April 29, 2020, a live segment was hosted by Xuxa Meneghel, featuring the judges and a group performance by the contestants from their homes, to open the vote for the winner.

Alma Thomas, who remained undefeated throughout the entirety of the season, won the competition with 50.58% of the public vote over Lucas Degasperi (26.69%), Sabrina Meirels (14.20%) and Ana Clemesha (8.53%), who came in second, third and fourth place respectively.

== The Four ==
Key
– Challenger against The Four won and secured a seat as a new member.
– Member of The Four did not perform.
– Member of The Four won the challenge and secured a seat.
– Member of The Four lost the challenge and was eliminated.
– Artist was not in the competition.
– Final member of The Four.

Artists	Episodes								
Artists	1	2	3	4	5	6	7	8	
Artists	1	2	3	4	5	6	7	Part 1	Part 2
Alma Thomas	SAFE	IN	SAFE	SAFE	SAFE	SAFE	IN	SAFE	WINNER
Lucas Degasperi								WIN	RUNNER-UP
Sabrina Meirels								WIN	THIRD
Ana Clemesha						WIN	SAFE	SAFE	FOURTH
Thais Kiwi			WIN	IN	SAFE	SAFE	SAFE	OUT	
Graziela Medori							WIN	OUT	
Renan de Lucca						WIN	OUT		
Jezrrel	IN	SAFE	SAFE	IN	IN	OUT			
Romero Ribeiro					WIN	OUT			
Flavia Gabê				WIN	OUT				
Fabiola Fisher			WIN	OUT					
Victor Mota	WIN	WIN	OUT						
John Bianchi		SAFE	OUT						
Marina Araújo	WIN	OUT							
Gaby Littré	OUT								
João Terra	OUT								

== Challenge episodes ==
Key
– Artist secured a spot and has remained in The Four.
– Artist won the challenge but was eventually eliminated.
– Artist was eliminated.

=== Week 1 (Mar. 08) ===
Starting lineup of The Four
Order	Artist	Song	Starting seat
1	Jezrrel	"Um Sonhador"	Put in seat 1
2	Gaby Littré	"At Last"	Put in seat 2
3	João Terra	"Ain't No Sunshine"	Put in seat 3
4	Alma Thomas	"Can't Take My Eyes Off You"	Put in seat 4

Artist performances on the first episode
Order	Artist	Song	Judges' verdict
1	Lígia Auter	"Não Vou Ficar"	Eliminated
2	Chris Carvalho	"Triste, Louca Ou Má"	Advanced
3	Ayrton Bak	"Something's Got a Hold on Me"	Eliminated
4	Marina Araújo	"Time After Time"	Advanced
5	Victor Mota	"Wicked Game"	Advanced

Challenge performances on the first episode
Order	Artist	Song	Challenge result
2.1	Alma Thomas	"Don't Let the Sun Go Down on Me"	Safe
2.2	Chris Carvalho	"Espumas Ao Vento"	Eliminated
4.1	Gaby Littré	"Meu Talismã"	Eliminated
4.2	Marina Araújo	"Bad Romance"	Put in seat 2
5.1	João Terra	"Unchain My Heart"	Eliminated
5.2	Victor Mota	"Wake Me Up"	Put in seat 3

=== Week 2 (Mar. 15) ===
- Group performance: "Born to Be Wild" / "Born This Way"

Artist performances on the second episode
Order	Artist	Song	Judges' verdict
1	Rafael de Lazare	"Superstition"	Advanced
2	Mya Machado	"Amor Perfeito"	Eliminated
3	Bel Spalla	"Roxanne"	Advanced
4	John Bianchi	"Lost Stars"	Advanced

Challenge performances on the second episode
Order	Artist	Song	Challenge result
1.1	Jezrrel	"Uptown Funk"	Safe
1.2	Rafael de Lazare	"Caso Sério"	Eliminated
3.1	Victor Mota	"Sinônimos"	Safe
3.2	Bel Spalla	"Je veux"	Eliminated
4.1	Marina Araújo	"Send My Love"	Eliminated
4.2	John Bianchi	"Flashdance... What a Feeling"	Put in seat 2

=== Week 3 (Mar. 25) ===
- Group performance: "Eye of the Tiger"

Artist performances on the third episode
Order	Artist	Song	Judges' verdict
1	Fabiola Fisher	"Because You Loved Me"	Advanced
2	Val Andrade	"Ain't No Mountain High Enough"	Advanced
3	Thais Kiwi	"Mercedes Benz"	Advanced
4	Léo Nilo	"Every Breath You Take"	Advanced

Challenge performances on the third episode
Order	Artist	Song	Challenge result
1.1	John Bianchi	"Locked Out of Heaven"	Eliminated
1.2	Fabiola Fisher	"Man! I Feel Like a Woman!"	Put in seat 2
2.1	Alma Thomas	"Você Me Vira a Cabeça"	Safe
2.2	Val Andrade	"Suspicious Minds"	Eliminated
3.1	Victor Mota	"A Thousand Years"	Eliminated
3.2	Thais Kiwi	"Let It Be"	Put in seat 3
4.1	Jezrrel	"Sugar"	Safe
4.2	Léo Nilo	"Livin' on a Prayer"	Eliminated

=== Week 4 (Apr. 01) ===
- Group performance: "Under Pressure"

Artist performances on the fourth episode
Order	Artist	Song	Judges' verdict
1	Ísis	"Million Reasons"	Eliminated
2	Flavia Gabê	"Que Sorte a Nossa"	Advanced
3	Jay Horsth	"Blowin' in the Wind"	Eliminated
4	Tita Garcia	"Nós"	Eliminated
5	Igor Godoi	"Thinking Out Loud"	Advanced

Challenge performances on the fourth episode
Order	Artist	Song	Challenge result
2.1	Fabiola Fisher	"Wrecking Ball"	Eliminated
2.2	Flavia Gabê	"Disk Me"	Put in seat 2
5.1	Alma Thomas	"Sangrando"	Safe
5.2	Igor Godoi	"Use Somebody"	Eliminated

=== Week 5 (Apr. 08) ===
- Group performance: "Apenas Mais Uma de Amor" / "Love of My Life"

Artist performances on the fifth episode
Order	Artist	Song	Judges' verdict
1	Romero Ribeiro	"Meu Ébano"	Advanced
2	Suelly Singer	"I Have Nothing"	Advanced
3	Guto Sant'anna	"Back for Good"	Eliminated
4	Rafa Moura	"Podres Poderes"	Advanced

Challenge performances on the fifth episode
Order	Artist	Song	Challenge result
1.1	Flavia Gabê	"A Boba Fui Eu"	Eliminated
1.2	Romero Ribeiro	"Verdade"	Put in seat 2
2.1	Thais Kiwi	"Bésame Mucho"	Safe
2.2	Suelly Singer	"Un-Break My Heart"	Eliminated
4.1	Alma Thomas	"País Tropical"	Safe
4.2	Rafa Moura	"Tempos Modernos"	Eliminated

=== Week 6 (Apr. 15) ===
- Group performance: "Você Não Serve Pra Mim"

Artist performances on the sixth episode
Order	Artist	Song	Judges' verdict
1	Renan de Lucca	"Billionaire"	Advanced
2	Isa Pimenta	"Na Sua Estante"	Advanced
3	Ana Clemesha	"Someone You Loved"	Advanced
4	Pollyana Papel	"What a Wonderful World"	Advanced

Challenge performances on the sixth episode
Order	Artist	Song	Challenge result
1.1	Romero Ribeiro	"Temporal"	Eliminated
1.2	Renan de Lucca	"Love Yourself"	Put in seat 2
2.1	Thais Kiwi	"Vem Quente que Eu Estou Fervendo"	Safe
2.2	Isa Pimenta	"You Oughta Know"	Eliminated
3.1	Jezrrel	"When a Man Loves a Woman"	Eliminated
3.2	Ana Clemesha	"When I Was Your Man"	Put in seat 1
4.1	Alma Thomas	"(You Make Me Feel Like)..."	Safe
4.2	Pollyana Papel	"I Say a Little Prayer"	Eliminated

=== Week 7 (Apr. 22) ===
- Group performance: "The Way You Make Me Feel"

Artist performances on the seventh episode
Order	Artist	Song	Judges' verdict
1	Pri Brenner	"A Whole New World"	Advanced
2	Marine Lima	"Vou Te Levar"	Eliminated
3	Vitor Moresco	"Back at One"	Eliminated
4	Graziela Medori	"Deixa Eu Dizer"	Advanced
5	Thais Moreira	"Grenade"	Advanced

Challenge performances on the seventh episode
Order	Artist	Song	Challenge result
1.1	Ana Clemesha	"Ain't No Other Man"	Safe
1.2	Pri Brenner	"Just the Way You Are"	Eliminated
4.1	Renan de Lucca	"Feeling Good"	Eliminated
4.2	Graziela Medori	"Expresso 2222"	Put in seat 2
5.1	Thais Kiwi	"Velha Roupa Colorida"	Safe
5.2	Thais Moreira	"Fim de Tarde"	Eliminated

=== Week 8 (Apr. 29) ===
- Group performance: "Girl on Fire" (online only)

Artist performances on the eighth episode
Order	Artist	Song	Judges' verdict
1	Beatriz Procópio	"Por Enquanto"	Advanced
2	Lucas Degasperi	"Dancing in the Dark"	Advanced
3	Rodrigo Oliveira	"I'm Not the Only One"	Advanced
4	Sabrina Meirels	"Trem das Onze"	Advanced

Challenge performances on the eighth episode
Order	Artist	Song	Challenge result
1.1	Ana Clemesha	"I Want to Know What Love Is"	Safe
1.2	Beatriz Procópio	"Chega"	Eliminated
2.1	Graziela Medori	"Fera Ferida" / "Força Estranha"	Eliminated
2.2	Lucas Degasperi	"Rocket Man"	Put in seat 2
3.1	Alma Thomas	"Empire State of Mind (Part II)"	Safe
3.2	Rodrigo Oliveira	"Save Me"	Eliminated
4.1	Thais Kiwi	"Light My Fire"	Eliminated
4.2	Sabrina Meirels	"Jorge Maravilha"	Put in seat 3

== Finale ==
=== Week 8 (Apr. 29) ===
Final Four group performance
Order	Artist	Song	Result
1	Alma Thomas	"A Cura" / "É Preciso Saber Viver"	Winner
2	Ana Clemesha	"A Cura" / "É Preciso Saber Viver"	Fourth place
3	Lucas Degasperi	"A Cura" / "É Preciso Saber Viver"	Runner-up
4	Sabrina Meirels	"A Cura" / "É Preciso Saber Viver"	Third place

Following the announcement that Thomas had won, she performed "Balada do Louco". (online only)

== Ratings and reception ==
=== Brazilian ratings ===
All numbers are in points and provided by Kantar Ibope Media.

Episode	Title	Air date	Timeslot (BRT)	SP viewers (in points)	Source
1	Week 1	March 8, 2020	Sunday 6:00 p.m.	6.4	
2	Week 2	March 15, 2020	Sunday 6:00 p.m.	5.0	
3	Week 3	March 25, 2020	Wednesday 10:30 p.m.	4.3	
4	Week 4	April 1, 2020	Wednesday 10:30 p.m.	4.0	
5	Week 5	April 8, 2020	Wednesday 10:30 p.m.	3.9	
6	Week 6	April 15, 2020	Wednesday 10:30 p.m.	3.1	
7	Week 7	April 22, 2020	Wednesday 10:30 p.m.	3.1	
8	Winner announced	April 29, 2020	Wednesday 10:30 p.m.	3.7	

- In 2020, each point represents 260.558 households in 15 market cities in Brazil (74.987 households in São Paulo).
