= Love Me So =

Single by Stereo Kicks
- Released: 21 June 2015
- Recorded: 2015
- Genre: Pop
- Length: 3:29
- Label: James Grant Music
- Songwriter: Tom Mann

"Love Me So" is the only single by English-Irish boy band Stereo Kicks. It was written by band member Tom Mann and was released in the United Kingdom on 21 June 2015 through James Grant Music.

On 27 June, the song debuted at number 31 on the UK Singles Chart after selling 15,755 copies, though it was the week's number-one physical single. Just two weeks later, however, Stereo Kicks announced their break-up.

== Music video ==
The official lyric video was uploaded on 20 April 2015, and the official music video was released on 6 May. On 21 May, Stereo Kicks released an acoustic rap version of the song on Vevo and YouTube.

== Track listing ==
Digital download

1. "Love Me So" - 3:29

== Charts ==
Chart (2015)	Peak position
Ireland (IRMA)	80
Scotland Singles (OCC)	19
UK Singles (OCC)	31

== Release history ==
Region	Date	Format	Label
United Kingdom	21 June 2015	Digital download	James Grant Music
