= The Four: Battle for Stardom season 2 =

The Four: Battle for Stardom
- Season 2
- Hosted by: Fergie
- Coaches: Sean Combs; Meghan Trainor; DJ Khaled
- Winner: James Graham
- Runner-up: Sharaya J

Release
- Original network: Fox
- Original release: June 7 – August 2, 2018

Season chronology
- ← Previous; Season 1

The second and final season of The Four: Battle for Stardom premiered on Fox on June 7, 2018. Fergie hosted the show, while Sean Combs, DJ Khaled and Meghan Trainor were judges. On August 2, 2018, the winner was announced as James Graham from Chelmsford, United Kingdom.

Fox ultimately canceled The Four without any announcement following the rating's popularity of its rival program, The Masked Singer.

== The Four ==
Key:

– Challenger against "The Four" won and secured a seat as a new member.
– Member of "The Four" did not perform.
– Member of "The Four" won the challenge and secured their seat.
– Member of "The Four" lost the challenge and was eliminated.
– Challenger to "The Four" lost their challenge and was eliminated.
– An eliminated artist who was chosen to return to the competition via #TheFourComeback earned a chance to challenge "The Four"
– Artist was chosen to return to the show, but lost their opportunity to challenge one of "The Four" when another comeback artist defeated them.
– Not in the competition.
– Final member of “The Four”
* – Original member of "The Four"

Artists	Episodes									
Artists	1	2	3	4	5	6	7		Finale	
Artists	1	2	3	4	5	6	Part 1	Part 2	Part 1	Part 2
James Graham*	SAFE	IN	SAFE	SAFE	SAFE	OUT	SAVE	WIN	SAFE	WINNER
Sharaya J*	IN	SAFE	SAFE	SAFE	SAFE	SAFE	N/A	SAFE	SAFE	RUNNER-UP
Leah Jenea						WIN	N/A	SAFE	OUT	
Whitney Reign		WIN	SAFE	OUT			SAVE	WIN	OUT	
Ali Caldwell				WIN	SAFE	SAFE	N/A	OUT		
JeRonelle McGhee						WIN	N/A	OUT		
Dylan Jacob					OUT		SAVE	OUT		
Carvena Jones*	OUT						SAVE	OUT		
Jesse Kramer		WIN	SAFE	SAFE	OUT		LOSE			
Ebon Lurks			OUT				LOSE			
Lil Bri			OUT				LOSE			
Stephanie Zelaya*	SAFE	OUT					LOSE			
Noah Barlass					WIN	OUT				
Majeste Pearson	WIN	OUT								

== Challenge Episodes ==
Key:

– Artist secured a spot and has remained in "The Four".
– Artist won their challenge, but was eventually eliminated from the competition.
– Artist was eliminated from the competition.
– Artist lost their challenge, and was originally eliminated, but received a second chance via #TheFourComeback.

=== Week 1 (June 7) ===
Before the competition began, each original member of The Four performed a solo song.

Starting lineup of The Four
Artist	Age	Hometown	Song	Starting seat
Carvena Jones	22	Jackson, Mississippi	"Fine China"	Put in seat 1
James Graham	21	Chelmsford, Essex, England	"I Can't Make You Love Me"	Put in seat 2
Stephanie Zelaya	26	Guatemala City, Guatemala	"Chantaje"	Put in seat 3
Sharaya J	34	Atlanta, Georgia	"Banji Certified"	Put in seat 4

Note : Sharaya J & James Graham Were also the final two.

Artist performances on the first episode
Order	Artist	Age	Hometown	Song	Judges' verdict	Trainor	Combs	Khaled
1	Chris Vanny	24	Orlando, Florida	"Maria Maria"/ "Wild Thoughts"	Eliminated			
2	Majeste Pearson	21	Tulsa, Oklahoma	"Someone Like You"	Advanced			
3	Christina Castle	21	Sydney, Australia	"Side to Side"	Eliminated			
4	Quinton Ellis	17	Conway, Arkansas	"U Got It Bad"	Advanced			
5	Rebecca Black	20	Anaheim, California	"Bye Bye Bye"	Advanced			

Challenge performances on the first episode
Order	Artist	Song	Challenge result
2.1	Carvena Jones	"Love Don't Live Here Anymore"	Eliminated
2.2	Majeste Pearson	"Chandelier"	Put in Seat 1
4.1	Stephanie Zelaya	"Mi Gente"	Safe
4.2	Quinton Ellis	"So Sick"	Eliminated
5.1	James Graham	"A Song for You"	Safe
5.2	Rebecca Black	"Torn"	Eliminated

=== Week 2 (June 14) ===
- Group performance: "All the Stars"

Artist performances on the second episode
Order	Artist	Age	Hometown	Song	Judges' verdict	Trainor	Combs	Khaled
1	Whitney Reign	25	Chicago, Illinois	"Issues"	Advanced			
2	De'Stani Bryant	16	Odessa, Texas	"So Gone"	Eliminated			
3	Stelle Amor	25	Nashville, Tennessee	"Mad World"	Eliminated			
4	James Farrow	25	Minneapolis, Minnesota	"Lean Back"	Advanced			
5	Skylar Dayne	21	Hialeah, Florida	"Wolves"	Eliminated			
6	Jesse Kramer	21	Nashville, Tennessee	"Hallelujah"	Advanced			

Challenge performances on the second episode
Order	Artist	Song	Challenge result
1.1	Stephanie Zelaya	"On The Floor"	Eliminated
1.2	Whitney Reign	"It's a Man's Man's Man's World"	Put in seat 3
4.1	Sharaya J	"Plain Jane"	Safe
4.2	James Farrow	"Panda"	Eliminated
6.1	Majeste Pearson	"Stone Cold"	Eliminated
6.2	Jesse Kramer	"All Along The Watchtower"	Put in seat 1

=== Week 3 (June 21) ===
- Group performance: "Believer"

Note: This is the first time that all four members have been challenged this season and this is the first time on The Four that all four members have defended their seats.

Artist performances on the third episode
Order	Artist	Age	Hometown	Song	Judges' verdict	Trainor	Combs	Khaled
1	Ebon Lurks	22	Tulsa, Oklahoma	"Photograph"	Advanced			
2	Elijah Connor	28	Detroit, Michigan	"Love"	Eliminated			
3	Matt Bloyd	25	Modesto, California	"How Will I Know"	Advanced			
4	Lil Bri	17	Houston, Texas	"Hate It Or Love It"	Advanced			
5	Christian Gonzalez	16	Miami, Florida	"Bailando"	Advanced			

Challenge performances on the third episode
Order	Artist	Song	Challenge result
1.1	Jesse Kramer	"You Are So Beautiful"	Safe
1.2	Ebon Lurks	"Mine"	Eliminated
3.1	Whitney Reign	"(You Make Me Feel Like) A Natural Woman"	Safe
3.2	Matt Bloyd	"Tennessee Whiskey"	Eliminated
4.1	Sharaya J	"Stir Fry"	Safe
4.2	Lil Bri	"Crush On You"	Eliminated
5.1	James Graham	"Lately"	Safe
5.2	Christian Gonzalez	"Hold On We're Going Home"	Eliminated

=== Week 4 (June 28) ===
- Group performance: "The Way I Are" (with Timbaland)

Artist performances on the fourth episode
Order	Artist	Age	Hometown	Song	Judges' verdict	Trainor	Combs	Khaled
1	Felix Thompson	24	Monroe, Georgia	"Can We Talk"	Advanced			
2	Alma Lake	21	Medellín, Colombia	"Ex's and Oh's"	Eliminated			
3	Ali Caldwell	29	Woodbridge, New Jersey	"Tell Me Something Good"	Advanced			
4	Dion Rene	28	Banes, Cuba	"Hero"	Advanced			
5	Brennan Villines	30	Memphis, Tennessee	"I'm Gonna Be (500 Miles)"	Advanced			

Challenge performances on the fourth episode
Order	Artist	Song	Challenge result
1.1	Jesse Kramer	"Hold On, I'm Comin'"	Safe
1.2	Felix Thompson	"That's What I Like"	Eliminated
3.1	Whitney Reign	"If You Don't Know Me By Now"	Eliminated
3.2	Ali Caldwell	"Set Fire To The Rain"	Put in seat 3
4.1	James Graham	"Human Nature"	Safe
4.2	Dion Rene	"Flor Pálida"	Eliminated
5.1	Sharaya J	"Go Raya (Original Song)"	Safe
5.2	Brennan Villines	"Let It Go"	Eliminated

=== Week 5 (July 12) ===
- Group performance: "Can't Feel My Face"

Artist performances on the fourth episode
Order	Artist	Age	Hometown	Song	Judges' verdict	Trainor	Combs	Khaled
1	Dylan Jacob	16	Las Vegas, Nevada	"Flava In Ya Ear"	Advanced			
2	Jade Milan	20	Baltimore, Maryland	"Grenade"	Eliminated			
3	Ronnie Smith Jr.	25	Miami, Florida	"U Don't Have To Call"	Advanced			
4	Noah Barlass	26	Welch, Oklahoma	"The Middle"	Advanced			
5	Kateri Bluford	23	Milwaukee, Wisconsin	"I'm Getting Ready"	Advanced			

Challenge performances on the fourth episode
Order	Artist	Song	Challenge result
1.1	Sharaya J	"She's a Bitch"	Safe
1.2	Dylan Jacob	"Dat Cheese" (Original Song)	Eliminated
3.1	James Graham	"On Bended Knee"	Safe
3.2	Ronnie Smith Jr.	"Let Me Love You"	Eliminated
4.1	Jesse Kramer	Nothing Compares 2 U	Eliminated
4.2	Noah Barlass	"Who You Are"	Put in Seat 1
5.1	Ali Caldwell	"Somebody Loves You Baby (You Know Who It Is)"	Safe
5.2	Kateri Bluford	"Because You Loved Me"	Eliminated

=== Week 6 (July 19) ===
- Group performance: "24K Magic

Artist performances on the fourth episode
Order	Artist	Age	Hometown	Song	Judges' verdict	Trainor	Combs	Khaled
1	JeRonelle McGhee	24	Omaha, Nebraska	"Too Close"	Advanced			
2	Mackenzie Johnson	25	Bucks County, Pennsylvania	"Love Yourself"	Eliminated			
3	Leah Jenea	17	Newark, New Jersey	"Best Part"	Advanced			
4	AJ Reynolds	25	Lee, New Hampshire	"Cheeks" (Original Song)	Advanced			
5	Anthony Gargiula	19	Orlando, Florida	"In My Blood"	Advanced			

Challenge performances on the fourth episode
Order	Artist	Song	Challenge result
1.1	Noah Barlass	"Chains"	Eliminated
1.2	JeRonelle McGhee	"This Woman's Work"	Put in seat 1
3.1	James Graham	"Want to Want Me"	Eliminated
3.2	Leah Jenea	"Call Out My Name"	Put in seat 2
4.1	Sharaya J	"I Don't Fuck with You"	Safe
4.2	AJ Reynolds	"King" (Original Song)	Eliminated
5.1	Ali Caldwell	"No More Drama"	Safe
5.2	Anthony Gargiula	"I'm Not the Only One"	Eliminated

== Comeback Performances ==
=== Week 7 (July 26) ===
Similar to last season, America voted on which of the eliminated contestants they wanted to return to the competition by tweeting the hashtag #TheFourComeback and the hashtag of the contestant's name. However, this season, people who challenged The Four and lost were also eligible in addition to previous members. On July 23, @TheFourOnFox (via Instagram) posted pictures which announced that Carvena Jones, Dylan Jacob, Ebon Lurks, James Graham, Jesse Kramer, Lil Bri, Stephanie Zelaya, and Whitney Reign were the top eight vote-getters, and will be returning to the competition.

==== Part 1: Head-To-Head Battles ====
- Group Performance: "I Want You Back" (featuring Evvie McKinney and Zhavia)

During the first part of the competition, the comeback artists split into pairs and performed for the favor of the audience. The audience selected one from each pair to immediately challenge one of the members of "The Four"

Head-to-Head Battle Results
Order	Artist	Song	Challenge result
1.1	Whitney Reign	"Mamma Knows Best"	Advanced
1.2	Stephanie Zelaya	"Bailamos"	Eliminated
3.1	Lil Bri	"All I Do is Win (No Matter What")	Eliminated
3.2	Dylan Jacob	"A Milli"	Advanced
5.1	Carvena Jones	"I Will Always Love You"	Advanced
5.2	Ebon Lurks	"Congratulations"	Eliminated
7.1	Jesse Kramer	"Come Together"	Eliminated
7.2	James Graham	"Writing's on the Wall"	Advanced

==== Part 2: Comeback Artist Challenge Performances ====
After winning their Head-to-Head battles, the four comeback artists each immediately challenged a member of "The Four" for an opportunity to claim a seat. This time, the judges decided who would advance to the finale instead of the audience.

Challenge Performance Results
Order	Artist	Song	Challenge result
2.1	Ali Caldwell	"My All"	Eliminated
2.2	Whitney Reign	"Don't Let Go (Love)"	Put in seat 3
4.1	Sharaya J	"Mama Said Knock You Out"	Safe
4.2	Dylan Jacob	"Quiet Storm"	Eliminated
6.1	Leah Jenea	"Focus"	Safe
6.2	Carvena Jones	"Feeling Good"	Eliminated
8.1	JeRonelle McGhee	"All of Me"	Eliminated
8.2	James Graham	"Without You"	Put in seat 1

== Finale ==
=== Week 8 (August 2) ===
- Group performance: "Hard"

==== Part 1: Head-to-Head Battles ====
In Part 1, the finalists each performed two songs. For the first song, each finalist performed in hopes of winning over the audience. After performing, the audience voted on their favorite performance, and the finalist with the most votes earned the power to choose who they wanted to battle against in the head-to-head challenge. For their second song, each selected pair went head-to-head. The judges picked a winner from each pair to move on to the final battle.

Selection Power Performances
Order	Artist	Song	Result	Opponent
1	Whitney Reign	"Lady Marmalade"	Did not receive	Sharaya
2	Leah Jenea	"True Colors"	Did not receive	James
3	Sharaya J	"Juicy"	Selected Whitney	Whitney
4	James Graham	"Rock with You"	Did not receive	Leah

Head-to-Head Performances
Order	Artist	Song	Result
5	Whitney Reign	"Million Reasons"	Eliminated
6	Sharaya J	"Cops Shot the Kid"	Advanced
7	Leah Jenea	"Golden"	Eliminated
8	James Graham	"Hello	Advanced

Non-Competition Performances
Order	Artist	Song
8.1	Evvie McKinney	"How Do You Feel"

==== Part 2: The Final Battle ====
For the final battle, the two finalists performed once more for the votes of the judges. The winner of this battle would be crowned the winner of The Four.

Final Head-to-head Performance Results
Order	Artist	Song	Result
9	Sharaya J	"Say Less" (Original Song)	Runner-Up
10	James Graham	"Fix You"	Winner

== Artists who appeared on previous shows ==
- James Graham was a member of the band Stereo Kicks which finished fifth on The X Factor during the eleventh season in 2014.
- Carvena Jones auditioned for the ninth season of American Idol but was cut in Hollywood week.
- Chris Vanny appeared on the second season of La Banda under the name Christian Castro. He was one of the five winners who were put together to form the winning band, MIX5.
- Christina Castle competed on the third season of The X Factor Australia under her real name, Christina Parie. She finished in sixth place.
- Skylar Dayne turned no chairs on the sixth season of The Voice and auditioned contestant on Idol Kids Puerto Rico, but was cut in the semi-finals.
- Ali Caldwell was a contestant on the eleventh season of The Voice on Team Miley Cyrus finishing in 5th place.
- Lil Bri appeared on the fourth season of Lifetime's The Rap Game finishing in second place.

== Ratings ==
Episode		Original airdate	Time slot (ET)	Viewers (in millions)	Adults (18–49)		Source
Episode		Original airdate	Time slot (ET)	Viewers (in millions)	Rating	Share	Source
1	"Week One"	June 7, 2018	Thursday 8:00 p.m.	2.43	0.7	3	
2	"Week Two"	June 14, 2018	Thursday 8:00 p.m.	2.19	0.7	3	
3	"Week Three"	June 21, 2018	Thursday 8:00 p.m.	2.38	0.7	3	
4	"Week Four"	June 28, 2018	Thursday 8:00 p.m.	2.58	0.8	4	
5	"Week Five"	July 12, 2018	Thursday 8:00 p.m.	2.81	0.8	4	
6	"Week Six"	July 19, 2018	Thursday 8:00 p.m.	2.86	0.9	5	
7	"Comeback Week"	July 26, 2018	Thursday 8:00 p.m.	3.12	0.9	5	
8	"The Finale"	August 2, 2018	Thursday 8:00 p.m.	3.40	1.0	5	
