= James Graham (singer) =

British singer from Chelmsford in Essex (born 1996)

- Born: 12 October 1996 (age 30); Chelmsford, Essex, England
- Occupation: Singer
- Instrument: Vocals
- Years active: 2014–present
- Label: Republic

James Graham (born 12 October 1996) is a British singer from Chelmsford in Essex. In 2018, Graham participated and emerged as the winner of the second season of the Fox’s The Four: Battle for Stardom.

== Career ==
=== 2014–15: The X Factor and Stereo Kicks ===
In 2014, he appeared on The X Factor on the eleventh series. He performed James Morrison's "You Give Me Something" in his Room Audition, getting a very good reaction from the judges, and Bonnie Raitt's "I Can't Make You Love Me" at the Arena; Mel B said that his performance was "soulful and sexy”. He was eventually placed in Stereo Kicks, an English-Irish boy band made up of eliminated auditionees from The X Factor audition process. Stereo Kicks consisted of James Graham in addition to contestants Jake Sims, Chris Leonard, Charlie Jones, Casey Johnson, Barclay Beales, Reece Bibby, and Tom Mann. The group finished fifth that season.

Their debut single "Love Me So" was released on 21 June 2015 and charted at number 31 on the UK Singles Chart. Just a month later, however, having been together under a year, they announced they were disbanding due to their failure to land a record deal.

=== 2018: The Four: Battle for Stardom ===
In 2018, Graham took part in The Four: Battle for Stardom in its second season. He is the winner of season 2 of the show.

== Awards and nominations ==
Year	Award	Category	Nominated work	Result
2018	Talent Recap Fan Choice Awards	Favorite Talent Show Winner	The Four: Battle For Stardom	Nominated
