= The Four Brasil season 1 =

The Four Brasil
- Season 1
- Hosted by: Xuxa Meneghel
- Coaches: Aline Wirley; João Marcello Bôscoli; Leo Chaves
- Winner: Ivan Lima
- Runner-up: Vivian Lemos

Release
- Original network: RecordTV
- Original release: February 6 – March 27, 2019

Season chronology
- Next → Season 2

The first season of The Four Brasil, hosted by Xuxa Meneghel and judged by Aline Wirley, João Marcello Bôscoli and Leo Chaves, premiered Wednesday, February 6, 2019, at 10:30 p.m. (BRT / AMT) on RecordTV. The winner is awarded a R$300.000 cash prize.

== The Four ==
Key
– Challenger against The Four won and secured a seat as a new member.
– Member of The Four did not perform.
– Member of The Four won the challenge and secured a seat.
– Member of The Four lost the challenge and was eliminated.
– Challenger to The Four lost the challenge and was eliminated.
– Artist was chosen to return and earned a chance to challenge The Four.
– Artist was chosen to return but lost the chance to challenge The Four.
– Artist was not in the competition.
– Final member of The Four.

Artists	Episodes									
Artists	1	2	3	4	5	6	7		8	
Artists	1	2	3	4	5	6	Part 1	Part 2	Part 1	Part 2
Ivan Lima					WIN	IN	N/A	SAFE	WIN	WINNER
Vivian Lemos						WIN	N/A	SAFE	WIN	RUNNER-UP
Leo Mahuad		WIN	SAFE	SAFE	SAFE	SAFE	N/A	SAFE	OUT	
Nega			WIN	IN	SAFE	SAFE	N/A	SAFE	OUT	
Erik Moraes	SAFE	OUT					SAVE	OUT		
Manso	IN	SAFE	SAFE	OUT			SAVE	OUT		
Rully	WIN	IN	OUT				SAVE	OUT		
Stanya	OUT						SAVE	OUT		
Arthur Olliver	WIN	OUT					LOSE			
Santaella				WIN	IN	OUT	LOSE			
Tay Rodriguez				WIN	OUT		LOSE			
Victor Filgueira		WIN	OUT				LOSE			
Kacá Novais			WIN	OUT						
Bruna Oliver	OUT									

== Challenge episodes ==
Key
– Artist secured a spot and has remained in The Four.
– Artist won the challenge but was eventually eliminated.
– Artist was eliminated.

=== Week 1 (Feb. 06) ===
- Group performance: "I Want It All" / "We Will Rock You"

Starting lineup of The Four
Order	Artist	Song	Starting seat
1	Stanya	"Sweet Dreams"	Put in seat 1
2	Manso	"She Will Be Loved"	Put in seat 2
3	Bruna Oliver	"Pesadão"	Put in seat 3
4	Erik Moraes	"Human"	Put in seat 4

Artist performances on the first episode
Order	Artist	Song	Judges' verdict
1	Kenia	"Human Nature"	Eliminated
2	Arthur Olliver	"Fallin'"	Advanced
3	Marcel Gorski	"Rolling in the Deep"	Eliminated
4	Rully	"Shallow"	Advanced
5	Rita Gutt	"Xodó"	Eliminated
6	Danny Queiroz	"Ride"	Advanced

Challenge performances on the first episode
Order	Artist	Song	Challenge result
2.1	Bruna Oliver	"Can't Feel My Face"	Eliminated
2.2	Arthur Olliver	"I Got You (I Feel Good)"	Put in seat 3
4.1	Stanya	"Rise Up"	Eliminated
4.2	Rully	"Simply the Best"	Put in seat 1
6.1	Erik Moraes	"Billie Jean"	Safe
6.2	Danny Queiroz	"Crazy"	Eliminated

=== Week 2 (Feb. 13) ===
- Group performance: "Vem Quente Que Eu Estou Fervendo"

Artist performances on the second episode
Order	Artist	Song	Judges' verdict
1	Camila Brandão	"Malandragem"	Eliminated
2	Quinara	"Stone Cold"	Advanced
3	Victor Filgueira	"Feeling Good"	Advanced
4	Tupi	"Quase Sem Querer"	Eliminated
5	Leo Mahuad	"When Love Comes to Town"	Advanced

Challenge performances on the second episode
Order	Artist	Song	Challenge result
2.1	Manso	"Isn't She Lovely"	Safe
2.2	Quinara	"Listen"	Eliminated
3.1	Arthur Olliver	"Chandelier"	Eliminated
3.2	Victor Filgueira	"I Put a Spell on You"	Put in seat 3
5.1	Erik Moraes	"Dream On"	Eliminated
5.2	Leo Mahuad	"Castle on the Hill"	Put in seat 4

=== Week 3 (Feb. 20) ===
- Group performance: "Rumour Has It / Someone like You"

Artist performances on the third episode
Order	Artist	Song	Judges' verdict
1	Simone Schuster	"No Roots"	Advanced
2	Kacá Novais	"Sangue Latino"	Advanced
3	Ju Romano	"Mercy"	Advanced
4	Nega	"O Mundo É Um Moinho"	Advanced

Challenge performances on the third episode
Order	Artist	Song	Challenge result
1.1	Leo Mahuad	"I Heard It Through the Grapevine"	Safe
1.2	Simone Schuster	"Uptown Funk"	Eliminated
2.1	Victor Filgueira	"Negro Gato"	Eliminated
2.2	Kacá Novais	"Sá Marina"	Put in seat 3
3.1	Manso	"Bang"	Safe
3.2	Ju Romano	"Bang Bang"	Eliminated
4.1	Rully	"Radioactive"	Eliminated
4.2	Nega	"Dona de Mim"	Put in seat 1

=== Week 4 (Feb. 27) ===
- Group performance: "Get Lucky" / "Ainda É Cedo"

Artist performances on the fourth episode
Order	Artist	Song	Judges' verdict
1	Camila Toledo	"Chain of Fools"	Eliminated
2	João Gomiero	"Hoochie Coochie Man"	Advanced
3	Tay Rodriguez	"Tempo Perdido"	Advanced
4	Santaella	"Don't Wanna Fight"	Advanced

Challenge performances on the fourth episode
Order	Artist	Song	Challenge result
2.1	Leo Mahuad	"Hold Back the River"	Safe
2.2	João Gomiero	"No Good"	Eliminated
3.1	Kacá Novais	"Medo Bobo"	Eliminated
3.2	Tay Rodriguez	"Believe"	Put in seat 3
4.1	Manso	"Laranja"	Eliminated
4.2	Santaella	"Earned It"	Put in seat 2

=== Week 5 (Mar. 06) ===
- Group performance: "It's My Life"

Artist performances on the fifth episode
Order	Artist	Song	Judges' verdict
1	Ivan Lima	"Wasting Love"	Advanced
2	Daniela Firme	"Piece of My Heart"	Eliminated
3	Mariana Suzzuke	"Não Vou Ficar"	Advanced
4	Ton Cremon	"Cryin'"	Advanced

Challenge performances on the fifth episode
Order	Artist	Song	Challenge result
1.1	Tay Rodriguez	"Price Tag"	Eliminated
1.2	Ivan Lima	"Still Loving You"	Put in seat 3
3.1	Nega	"Alô, Alô Marciano"	Safe
3.2	Mariana Suzzuke	"Run to You"	Eliminated
4.1	Leo Mahuad	"Treat You Better"	Safe
4.2	Ton Cremon	"Sweet Child o' Mine"	Eliminated

=== Week 6 (Mar. 13) ===
- Group performance: "Runnin' (Lose It All)"

Artist performances on the sixth episode
Order	Artist	Song	Judges' verdict
1	Patrícia Toledo	"Girl on Fire"	Eliminated
2	Nano Vianna	"What's Up?"	Advanced
3	Israel Paulo	"Primavera"	Eliminated
4	Carol Fincatti	"You're Still the One"	Advanced
5	Vivian Lemos	"Love on the Brain"	Advanced

Challenge performances on the sixth episode
Order	Artist	Song	Challenge result
2.1	Leo Mahuad	"Proud Mary"	Safe
2.2	Nano Vianna	"Não Deixe o Samba Morrer"	Eliminated
4.1	Nega	"Canto das Três Raças"	Safe
4.2	Carol Fincatti	"You and I"	Eliminated
5.1	Santaella	"If I Ain't Got You"	Eliminated
5.2	Vivian Lemos	"(You Make Me Feel Like)..."	Put in seat 2

== Comeback episode ==
=== Week 7 (Mar. 20) ===
- Group performance: "Stronger (What Doesn't Kill You)"

==== Part 1: Head-to-Head Battle ====
The comeback artists are split into pairs for their first performances. The audience selected one from each pair to immediately challenge one of the members of "The Four".

Order	Artist	Song	Challenge result
1.1	Victor Filgueira	"Crazy in Love"	Eliminated
1.2	Rully	"Umbrella"	Advanced
3.1	Arthur Olliver	"The Way You Make Me Feel"	Eliminated
3.2	Erik Moraes	"Always"	Advanced
5.1	Stanya	"Killing Me Softly with His Song"	Advanced
5.2	Tay Rodriguez	"Try"	Eliminated
7.1	Santaella	"Me de Motivos"	Eliminated
7.2	Manso	"Tente Outra Vez"	Advanced

==== Part 2: Comeback Challenge ====
After winning their Head-to-Head battles, the four comeback artists each immediately challenged a member of "The Four" for an opportunity to claim a seat.

Order	Artist	Song	Challenge result
2.1	Rully	"Como Nossos Pais"	Eliminated
2.2	Nega	"Envolvidão"	Safe
4.1	Erik Moraes	"Volta pra Mim"	Eliminated
4.2	Leo Mahuad	"O Tempo Não Para"	Safe
6.1	Stanya	"Ginga"	Eliminated
6.2	Vivian Lemos	"Hello"	Safe
8.1	Manso	"Iris"	Eliminated
8.2	Ivan Lima	"Bohemian Rhapsody"	Safe

== Finale ==
=== Week 8 (Mar. 27) ===
- Group performance: "This Is Me"
- Musical guest: Ludmilla ("Clichê" / "Cheguei")

==== Part 1: Head-to-Head Battle ====
Each finalist performed two songs. For the first song, each finalist performed in hopes of winning over the audience. After performing, the audience voted for their favorite performance, and the finalist with the most votes earned the power to choose who they wanted to battle against in the head-to-head challenge. For the second song, each selected pair went head-to-head. The public picked a winner from each pair to move on to the final battle.

Selection Power performances
Order	Artist	Song	Result
1	Nega	"Jack Soul Brasileiro"	Did not receive
2	Vivian Lemos	"Nada Mais"	Did not receive
3	Ivan Lima	"The Show Must Go On"	Selected Leo
4	Leo Mahuad	"Mercy"	Did not receive

Head-to-Head performances
Order	Artist	Song	Result
5	Leo Mahuad	"I Just Wanna Make Love to You"	Eliminated
6	Ivan Lima	"Hallelujah"	Advanced
7	Nega	"Canta Brasil"	Eliminated
8	Vivian Lemos	"Earth Song"	Advanced

==== Part 2: The Final Two Battle ====
For the final battle, the two finalists performed once more for the votes from the Brazilian public. The winner of this battle would be crowned the winner of The Four Brasil.

The Final Two performances
Order	Artist	Song	Result
9	Vivian Lemos	"Love Hurts"	Runner-up
10	Ivan Lima	"Stairway to Heaven"	Winner

Following the announcement that Lima had won, he performed "Angels".

== Ratings and reception ==
=== Brazilian ratings ===
All numbers are in points and provided by Kantar Ibope Media.

Episode	Title	Air date	Timeslot (BRT)	SP viewers (in points)	Source
1	Week 1	February 6, 2019	Wednesday 10:30 p.m.	7.4	
2	Week 2	February 13, 2019	Wednesday 10:30 p.m.	6.9	
3	Week 3	February 20, 2019	Wednesday 10:30 p.m.	6.5	
4	Week 4	February 27, 2019	Wednesday 10:30 p.m.	6.6	
5	Week 5	March 6, 2019	Wednesday 10:30 p.m.	6.4	
6	Week 6	March 13, 2019	Wednesday 10:30 p.m.	6.7	
7	Week 7	March 20, 2019	Wednesday 10:30 p.m.	6.9	
8	Winner announced	March 27, 2019	Wednesday 10:30 p.m.	6.2	

- In 2019, each point represents 254.892 households in 15 market cities in Brazil (73.015 households in São Paulo).
