= Charlie Walk =

American music executive and entrepreneur (born 1968)

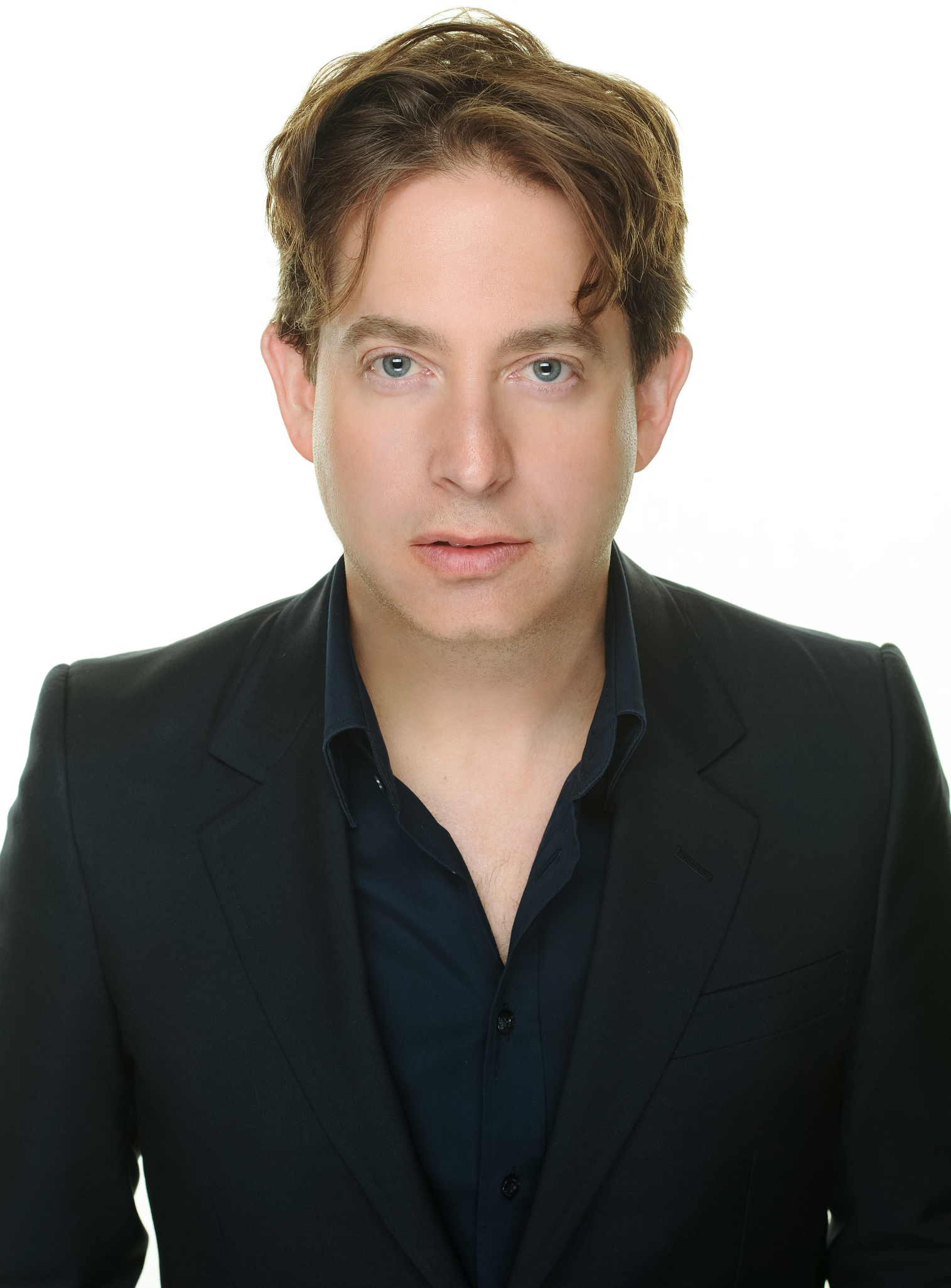
- Walk in 2014
- Born: September 2, 1968 (age 58)
- Education: Boston University
- Spouse: Lauran Walk
- Website: www.musicmastery.com

Charlie Walk (born September 2, 1968) is an American music executive and entrepreneur. He was the president of Republic Records from 2016–2018, and the president of Epic Records from 2005–2008. In 2018, he appeared as a judge on the Fox reality series The Four: Battle for Stardom.

== Early life and education ==
Walk listened to Boston's WRKO on his portable radio as a child and said he first wanted to work in the music industry when he was eight years old.

He attended Boston University Questrom School of Business. He graduated in 1990 with a Bachelor of Science degree in business administration.

== Career ==
=== Columbia Records ===
Walk began his career as a college rep for Sony Music, then CBS Records, while a student at BU. He was hired as a marketing and promotion manager for Columbia Records in1990. He worked out of the CBS Northeast distribution office in Winchester, Massachusetts. Among other early projects, he promoted the debut album by New Kids on the Block.

During his time at Columbia he became vice president for promotion at the label. He was profiled in The New York Times in 1988. At Columbia he worked with Destiny's Child and Beyoncé Knowles, Will Smith, Maxwell, John Legend, Mariah Carey, The Fugees, Lauryn Hill, Wyclef Jean, John Mayer, Bruce Springsteen, and Aerosmith.

He was named executive vice president, promotion, in 2000 from the position of senior vice president of pop promotion. In 2004, he was promoted to executive vice president of creative marketing and promotion at Columbia where he was in charge of developing non-traditional marketing strategies.

=== Epic Records ===
In December 2005, Walk became president of Epic Records. Jessica Simpson moved from Columbia to Epic to follow Walk. He also worked with the label’s established artists, including RedOne.

He also created a partnership with ABC to integrate Epic artists with their programming, which enabled viewers to purchase songs they heard on ABC television shows. He led the campaigns that broke new artists including The Script, Sean Kingston, The Fray, Sara Bareilles and Natasha Bedingfield. He was let go from the label in December 2008.

=== JWALK ===
In February 2009, Walk started his own entertainment company CWE Media to create content for Endemol, with a talent management and strategic branding divisions. Walk was executive producing the television content developed by the company. The company was functioning until 2011.

Later in 2009, Walk co-founded RJW Collective, later known as JWALK. The company's clients include the retailer Lacoste and the television broadcaster ABC.

=== Republic Records ===
In 2013 Walk joined Republic Records as its executive vice president. His position involves overseeing the marketing, PR and promotion teams for the label. On July 2, 2014, Walk produced a one-off revival episode of Total Request Live on MTV entitled "Total Ariana Live". He has also helped bring in John Varvatos Records.

In 2014, Walk led Enrique Iglesias' "Bailando" single campaign, which crossed the song over from Latin radio to Top 40 radio. The song has a blend of English and Spanish lyrics, and became the highest charting bilingual single since "The Macarena" in 1996. Walk spearheaded Taylor Swift’s "Shake It Off" campaign which led Swift to become the first artist to have a single debut at number one on the pop music radio charts. Additionally, Walk led the promotion for Lorde's quadruple platinum single "Royals". The Wall Street Journal wrote that Walk "is working on creating partnerships with radio stations, concert venues and music publications or blogs that will circulate her music without catapulting it into the mainstream. Instead of sending her music to KIIS, a famous top-40 Los Angeles radio station, they've turned to San Francisco's Live105 and Chicago's Q101, alternative stations." Walk also signed Hailee Steinfeld to Republic.

In February 2016, Walk was named president of the Republic Group, a newly formed grouping under the Universal Music Group, where he was charged with developing strategic partnerships with sister labels in addition to his role in charge of promotions and artist development. In 2016 Walk co-founded Guess Music, after approaching Paul Marciano to discuss his expanding their partnership into a full-fledged label. He also signed DNCE.

== Aspen Artists ==
In 2023, Walk launched Aspen Artists, a media platform for marketing, branding and promoting music artists. Their offices are located in New York City and Mexico City

== Allegations of sexual misconduct ==
Walk was accused of sexual misconduct on January 29, 2018. He denied the allegation. On January 31, Republic placed him on leave, pending an investigation. He resigned from his position as a judge on The Four: Battle for Stardom on February 1. In a statement, he said: "Out of respect for the contestants, my fellow judges and everyone involved with the show, I have made the decision not to attend the finale of The Four. I do not want my presence to be a distraction. Needless to say this is very upsetting."

In March 2018, following an internal review, Universal and Walk agreed to "mutually part ways."

In March 2021, Walk filed a lawsuit seeking $60 million in damages from Marc Kasowitz, the attorney who negotiated his Universal exit deal. The suit stated that rather than defending Walk against "facially incredible claims," Kasowitz and his law firm "passively cooperated with UMG, leaving Mr. Walk defenseless." The suit was dismissed in January 2022 by New York Supreme Court Justice Andrew Borrok.

== Personal life ==
Walk and Lauran Miller were married in 1997. They have four children.

Preceded by Polly Anthony	Chairman & Chief Executive Officer of Epic Records; 2005–2008	Succeeded by Amanda Ghost
