= The Four: Battle for Stardom =

- Also known as: The Four
- Genre: Reality television
- Created by: Elwin Vitztelly de Groot; Armoza Formats
- Directed by: Phil Heyes
- Presented by: Fergie
- Judges: Sean Combs; DJ Khaled; Meghan Trainor; Charlie Walk
- Country of origin: United States
- Original language: English
- No. of seasons: 2
- No. of episodes: 14

Production
- Executive producers: David George; Adam Sher; David Eilenberg; Becca Walker; David Friedman; Carlos King; Avi Armoza; Nehama Cohen; Moshiko Cohen; Elwin Vitztelly de Groot
- Producer: Sean Combs
- Production companies: ITV Entertainment; Armoza Formats; Revolt Studios

Original release
- Network: Fox
- Release: January 4 – August 2, 2018

The Four: Battle for Stardom, also known as The Four, is an American reality television music competition series broadcast on Fox. Premiering on January 4, 2018, the show was eventually renewed for a second season which aired on June 7, 2018. The winner, determined by a studio audience and panelists, is awarded a recording contract with Republic Records, a division of Universal Music Group, and named iHeartRadio's "On the Verge" artist. The winners of the first two seasons are Evvie McKinney and James Graham.

The show's panelists originally included Sean Combs, DJ Khaled, Meghan Trainor, and Charlie Walk. However, Walk withdrew from the series prior to the season one finale following sexual assault allegations against him. Subsequent episodes starred the other three panelists.

== Format ==
Based on an Israeli format of the same title, The Four is a singing competition that differs among similar talent competitions, in that there are no stage auditions. The artists, also known as the challengers, are held in the holding room before singing in front of a live studio audience and the judges. The panel of people in the music industry ultimately decides the best challengers that compete against "The Four". Their decision must be unanimous. The members consist of vocalists of varying genres, and they must win challenges against new artists to keep their seat and remain as a member of "The Four". At the end of six weeks, the last singer standing among "The Four" wins the competition.

There are two distinct rounds in The Four. In the performances round, new challengers must earn their seat by performing in front of a live studio audience, the panel of judges and "The Four". After the performance, the judges then vote and make a "Yes" or "No" decision, signifying the challenger's fate in the competition. If a challenger receives a unanimous four blue rings on stage (four "Yes" votes from the panel), they advance to the next round of the competition. A red ring given to the challenger signifies a "No", ending his or her time in the competition. Artists who advance to the challenge round can compete against a member of "The Four" for their seat. In a sing-off style battle, the challenger and "The Four" member sing against each other for their seat. After the challenge, the studio audience then votes to decide which of the two should remain in the competition. The winner locks his or her seat for the rest of the night and cannot be challenged again until the next episode.

== Series overview ==
| Season | First aired | Last aired | Winner | Runner-up | Other finalists | | Presenter | Panelists | | | |
|---|---|---|---|---|---|---|---|---|---|---|---|
| 1 | January 4, 2018 | February 8, 2018 | Evvie McKinney | Candice Boyd | Vincint | Zhavia | Fergie | Charlie Walk^{1} | Sean Combs | Meghan Trainor | DJ Khaled |
| 2 | June 7, 2018 | August 2, 2018 | James Graham | Sharaya J | Leah Jenea | Whitney Reign | Fergie | N/A | Sean Combs | Meghan Trainor | DJ Khaled |

Notes

1. Walk withdrew from the show following episode 5.

== Season synopsis ==
Winners and runners-up are indicated in gold and silver, respectively.

=== Season 1 ===
The first season of The Four premiered on January 4, 2018, and concluded on February 8, 2018. After six episodes, Evvie McKinney was announced as the winner of the season, with Candice Boyd as the runner-up. The final group of "The Four" also included Vincint Cannady and Zhavia Ward.

The Four
| Episode | Group | Members | | | |
| Episode | Group | Seat 1 | Seat 2 | Seat 3 | Seat 4 |
| 1 | Original Four | Lex Lu | Ash Minor | Elanese Lansen | Blair Perkins |
| 1 | 2nd Four | Lex Lu | Ash Minor | Zhavia Ward | Saeed Renaud |
| 2 | 3rd Four | Cheyenne Elliot | Candice Boyd | Zhavia Ward | Jason Warrior |
| 3 | 4th Four | Rell Jerv | Tim Johnson Jr. | Zhavia Ward | Jason Warrior |
| 4 | 5th Four | Nick Harrison | Tim Johnson Jr. | Kendyle Paige | Jason Warrior |
| 5.1 | 6th Four | Nick Harrison | Tim Johnson Jr. | Evvie McKinney | Vincint Cannady |
| 5.2 | Final Four | Candice Boyd | Zhavia Ward | Evvie McKinney | Vincint Cannady |
| 6 | Final Four | Candice Boyd | Zhavia Ward | Evvie McKinney | Vincint Cannady |

=== Season 2 ===
The second and final season of The Four premiered on June 7, 2018, and concluded on August 2, 2018. The first members of "The Four" were announced on May 9, 2018. They included Carvena Jones, James Graham, Sharaya J, and Stephanie Zelaya. Following eight episodes, James Graham was announced as the winner of the season, with Sharaya J as the runner-up. Leah Jenea and Whitney Reign were finalists. Runner-up Sharaya J. remained undefeated throughout the entirety of the season.

The Four
| Episode | Group | Members | | | |
| Episode | Group | Seat 1 | Seat 2 | Seat 3 | Seat 4 |
| 1 | Original Four | Carvena Jones | James Graham | Stephanie Zelaya | Sharaya J. |
| 1 | 2nd Four | Majeste Pearson | James Graham | Stephanie Zelaya | Sharaya J. |
| 2 | 3rd Four | Jesse Kramer | James Graham | Whitney Reign | Sharaya J. |
| 3 | 4th Four | Jesse Kramer | James Graham | Whitney Reign | Sharaya J. |
| 4 | 5th Four | Jesse Kramer | James Graham | Ali Caldwell | Sharaya J. |
| 5 | 6th Four | Noah Barlass | James Graham | Ali Caldwell | Sharaya J. |
| 6 | 7th Four | JeRonelle McGhee | Leah Jenea | Ali Caldwell | Sharaya J. |
| 7 | Final Four | James Graham | Leah Jenea | Whitney Reign | Sharaya J. |
| 8 | Final Four | James Graham | Leah Jenea | Whitney Reign | Sharaya J. |

== Reception ==
=== Awards and nominations ===
| Year | Award | Category | Nominee | Result | Ref. |
|---|---|---|---|---|---|
| 2018 | Teen Choice Awards | Choice TV Series: Reality | The Four: Battle for Stardom | Nominated | |
| 2018 | Teen Choice Awards | Choice TV Personality | DJ Khaled | Nominated | |
| 2018 | Teen Choice Awards | Choice TV Personality | Meghan Trainor | Nominated | |
| 2018 | National Film & Television Awards | Best Talent Show | The Four: Battle for Stardom | Won | |
| 2018 | National Film & Television Awards | Best Reality TV Show | The Four: Battle for Stardom | Nominated | |
| 2018 | National Film & Television Awards | Best Entertainment Show | The Four: Battle for Stardom | Nominated | |
| 2018 | National Film & Television Awards | Best Reality TV Judge | DJ Khaled | Nominated | |
| 2018 | National Film & Television Awards | Best Reality TV Judge | Sean Combs | Nominated | |
| 2019 | 32nd Kids' Choice Awards | Favorite TV Judges | Sean Combs, DJ Khaled, Meghan Trainor | Nominated | |

=== Ratings ===
The first season of The Four was Fox's most watched and highest-rated new unscripted series in nearly four years.

| Season | Timeslot (ET) | # Ep. | Premiered | | Ended | | TV season | Season ranking | Viewers (in millions) |
| Season | Timeslot (ET) | # Ep. | Date | Premiere viewers (in millions) | Date | Finale viewers (in millions) | TV season | Season ranking | Viewers (in millions) |
|---|---|---|---|---|---|---|---|---|---|
| 1 | Thursday; 8:00 PM | 6 | January 4, 2018 | 3.75 | February 8, 2018 | 4.03 | 2017–18 | 117 | 4.19 |
| 2 | Thursday; 8:00 PM | 8 | June 7, 2018 | 2.43 | August 2, 2018 | 3.40 | 2017–18 | —N/a | 2.72 |
