= Square Shells =

EP by Kurt Vile
- Released: May 24, 2010
- Recorded: "Between Then and Now" at The Big House and Adam Granduciel's joint.
- Genre: Lo-fi, Indie rock, Folk rock
- Language: English
- Label: Matador Records

Kurt Vile chronology
| Childish Prodigy (2009) | Square Shells (2010) | Smoke Ring for My Halo (2011) |

Square Shells is a limited edition EP by American indie rock musician Kurt Vile, released on May 24, 2010 on Matador Records. Regarding the release, Vile stated: "[The EP is] a collection of some home recordings and some studio recordings. I put the songs together, see what they need, maybe add some more here, maybe songs from back in the day. [..] No different from Constant Hitmaker or God Is Saying This to You.... It's just a compilation. Psychedelic, kind of mellow."

The EP was available as a free download during its first twenty-four hours of release.

== Background and recording ==
Regarding the track, "Losing Momentum (for Jim Jarmusch)", which references filmmaker Jim Jarmusch in its title, Kurt Vile noted: "I have an early EP my buddy Richie put out, called The Hunchback EP, and there's a song called "Losing It" on there. The record is 45 RPM, but it doesn't say it on there, so people were playing it at 33, and tons of people were coming up to me [saying], like, "Dude, you should listen to that at 33." So I did. And the instrumental "Losing It" is "Losing Momentum"… it's the same song, just recorded from 33, and it sounded really slow. It sounded like it belonged in a film. Right away, I was like, "Man, this belongs in a movie. This belongs in a Jim Jarmusch movie." Eventually he's gonna see it, and then he'll have to hear it, and then he did hear it. [...] He curated an All Tomorrow's Parties, and he was like, "I heard that, Kurt. Thank you. But I want you to know that's not why I invited you to this." He's a fan, so that's awesome. That's the same reason you cover "The Monkey" by Dim Stars, which is Thurston Moore and Richard Hell. You know that eventually they'll hear it. It's a way of reaching out to them."

== Reception ==
Professional ratings
Review scores
| Source | Rating |
|---|---|
| Consequence of Sound | 4/5 stars |
| Pitchfork | 7.6/10 |

Pitchfork's David Bevan gave the EP a positive review, stating: "With seven beautifully sequenced songs in 27 minutes, it's more substantial than your traditional stopgap, with more to explore. [...] It's a satisfying EP that leaves open the question of where Vile's music might go next. Will he work more in the folk lane and away from FM radio licks? Will he go it alone or will the Violators be at his side?" Writing for Consequence of Sound, Adam Kivel wrote: "Whether the next LP will bring back the heavier, fuller side of Vile’s sound is yet to be seen. But, a disc like this, even as an EP, makes you wish he could keep making them this way for a while."

== Track listing ==
All tracks written by Kurt Vile except where noted.

1. "Ocean City"
2. "Invisibility: Nonexistent"
3. "Losing Momentum (for Jim Jarmusch)"
4. "I Wanted Everything"
5. "I Know I Got Religion"
6. "The Finder" (Vile/Adam Granduciel)
7. "Hey, Now I'm Movin"

== Personnel ==
=== Musicians ===
- Kurt Vile – vocals, guitar, Korgs (6)
- Adam Granduciel – baritone guitar (3), Yamahas (6), additional overdubs (2 and 7)
- Michael Johnson – drums (2)

=== Recording personnel ===
- Kurt Vile – recording (3 and 6)
- Adam Granduciel – recording (3 and 6), mixing (2 and 7)
- David Park – recording (2)

=== Artwork ===
- Matt Horseshit – shell art
- Sore Eros – power plant sunrise
