= Wakin on a Pretty Daze =

Studio album by Kurt Vile
- Released: April 9, 2013
- Recorded: February 2012 & May–November 2012
- Studio: New York City, California and Philadelphia
- Genre: Indie rock; psychedelic rock
- Length: 69:03
- Label: Matador
- Producer: John Agnello, Kurt Vile & the Violators

Kurt Vile chronology
So Outta Reach (2011)	Wakin on a Pretty Daze (2013)	It's a Big World Out There (And I Am Scared) (2013)

Alternate cover
- Deluxe Daze (Post Haze) cover art

Wakin on a Pretty Daze is the fifth studio album by American indie rock musician Kurt Vile, released on April 9, 2013, on Matador Records. Produced by both John Agnello and Kurt Vile & the Violators, the album is the first not to feature contributions from long-time collaborator and former bandmate Adam Granduciel.

Regarding the album's thematic and lyrical content, Vile stated, "It's just about my life, without thinking too much about it. I feel comfortable with the lyrics. I think myself and my bandmates, my close bandmates, Rob Laakso and Jesse Trbovich, they're right there with me. We all live it." The album reached number forty-seven on the Billboard 200 and forty-one on the UK Albums Chart.

A deluxe edition of the album, entitled Wakin on a Pretty Daze: Deluxe Daze (Post Haze), was released on November 13, 2013. The re-release included a new EP, It's a Big World Out There (And I Am Scared), and new artwork by Steve Powers.

== Background and recording ==
In 2011, Kurt Vile's fourth studio album, Smoke Ring for My Halo, was met with critical acclaim and its release significantly expanded his fan base. Reflecting on the extensive touring schedule which accompanied the album, Vile noted, "Things were going good and people were coming to our shows, which is nice, but it's also draining. And I have a family, so there are all kinds of psychological things weighing you down. So it's not like a cushy lifestyle — there's struggle and urgency in there in its own right. Ultimately you want some kind of struggle." Vile began writing tracks for his fifth studio album whilst on tour, practicing them during soundchecks: "The record was written all over the place, on tour," Vile elaborated "I was playing more gigs and more soundchecks and I was creating these sort of more epic tunes."

Following the album's release longtime collaborator and guitarist Adam Granduciel departed from The Violators to focus on his own musical project, The War on Drugs, with sometime studio collaborator Rob Laakso joining in his place. Vile stated, "My newest steady bandmate [is] Rob Laakso, I’ve known him longer than I’ve known other members of my band. He joined the band right after Smoke Ring came out. He’s like a wiz-kid with synthesizers and engineering in general and guitar. He can sync things up with sequences and all that kind of stuff that I like, but am too ADD to figure it out." At the close of the tour, drummer Mike Zanghi quietly departed from the band.

Vile and the remaining Violators, Laakso and Jesse Trbovich, entered the studio with producer John Agnello, who had previously produced Smoke Ring for My Halo. Using three studio drummers – including Warpaint's Stella Mozgawa, Vince Nudo of Priestess and former Violator, Michael Johnson – the band worked on songs with longer, more experimental arrangements, with Vile initially comparing the album to Fleetwood Mac's 1979 album, Tusk, stating "It's so many hours of sessions. It's totally our Tusk, but no cheese. Just rock."

Vile noted that The Violators involvement with the recording process was more prominent than on previous releases, noting, "One day I’d like to make a record that is credited to ‘Kurt Vile and the Violators’, but so far in my career all my albums have felt like solo albums that we then take on tour with the band, but [...] on this one I think everyone contributed a bit more."

== Writing and composition ==
Wakin on a Pretty Daze features songs with longer tracks lengths than on previous releases, with Vile noting, "It was just the next logical step from making succinct pop songs. What do you do after that? You make pop songs that are longer and more epic, that push the envelope. Imagine your favourite song, or something that you play over and over in the car, except that you don't have to start it over as much."

Regarding his musical influences on Wakin on a Pretty Daze, Vile stated, "I was listening to some really disparate stuff while writing it, like there was this one Gary Numan song, "Are Friends Electric?", and some other weird early-80s stuff, that I think worked its way in there."

Vile was also influenced by music critic Barney Hoskyns' 2005 book, Hotel California: Singer-Songwriters & Cocaine Cowboys In The L.A. Canyons, stating: "You know, just getting deep into that world of artists that I like, I find exciting, but this was like the first time [I had read something] that was about the whole scene. You see the whole thing grow. It's tailor-made for my mind. [...] Influence is all osmosis, but that book influenced me a gigantic way, and it also influenced me in a subconscious way. I mean, obviously, it influenced me enough to want to go to California and work with [lap-steel guitarist] Farmer Dave."

== Title ==
Regarding the album's title, which is a pun on the album's first track, "Wakin on a Pretty Day", Vile noted, "It's probably the most simple title that I ever had. It's like the simplest pun ever. It rolls off the tongue, but also it's the kind of thing, once you have the record, you'll understand. The first song on the record is called "Wakin on a Pretty Day," which is like the tone setter. It's not just an album you name after one of the songs, that you just morph it a little bit. The whole general thing is one long daze, and that's waking up."

== Artwork ==
The album's cover photograph features a mural by Philadelphia-based street artist Steve Powers, with Vile noting, "Everybody who rides the 'EL' [elevated train line] sees it. It's so colourful. It's so cool to have my own mural, let alone [one] by a great artist." The mural features images and words based on the album's eleven tracks. The mural is located on the side of W.M. Mulherin's Sons restaurant on Front Street in the Fishtown neighborhood of Philadelphia.

In the Violators band photograph, which appears on the back cover, Vile is wearing a T-shirt featuring record label, Richie Records, which had previously released the band's The Hunchback EP (2009). Vile also holds a red apple, alluding to the tracks, "Red Apples" and "Runner Ups", from God Is Saying This to You... (2009) and Smoke Ring for My Halo (2011), respectively. The graffiti which reads "th' violators" on the back cover was by Vile himself: "I made sure that it says 'The Violators' on the back of the cover art, I did the graffiti for that myself."

== Reception ==
Professional ratings
Aggregate scores
Source	Rating
AnyDecentMusic?	8.0/10
Metacritic	82/100
Review scores
Source	Rating
AllMusic	5/5 stars
Entertainment Weekly	B+
The Guardian	4/5 stars
Mojo	4/5 stars
NME	8/10
The Observer	4/5 stars
Pitchfork	8.5/10
Q	4/5 stars
Rolling Stone	3/5 stars
Spin	9/10

Wakin on a Pretty Daze received critical acclaim upon its release. At Metacritic, which assigns a normalized rating out of 100 to reviews from mainstream critics, the album has received an average score of 82, based on 32 reviews. Pitchfork's Jayson Greene gave the album a "Best New Music" designation, writing "Wakin on a Pretty Daze is Vile's most spacious, becalmed record yet, and it contains some of his best-ever brand of cosmic stand-up [...] [The album] feels like the culmination of Vile's quest to get away from people, noises, civilization and find somewhere to sit and whistle his own tune." In another positive review, AllMusic's Fred Thomas wrote: "It becomes clear that Kurt Vile isn't aiming to ape or even update the canon of classic guitar-based songwriters, but is very much his generation's chapter of the evolution of rock. Easily his most focused and accessible work, Pretty Daze is the strongest so far in a chain of releases that seem to suggest there are even greater heights to be reached." NME's Hazel Sheffield wrote, "[On] Wakin On A Pretty Daze, [Vile] turns his attention to writing proper songs. The album is bookended by two monster tracks that each hover around the 10-minute mark. Neither track loses direction." Russell Warfield, of Drowned in Sound described Wakin on a Pretty Daze as: "one of those rare examples of an artist’s uninhibited self-indulgence resulting in an LP which plays firmly to their strengths. Undoubtedly, it’s an album which moves away from the tighter verse-chorus structures of breakthrough, Smoke Ring for My Halo, but one which takes the dive into looser structure with the best of faith."

Nick Catucci of Rolling Stone, on the other hand, gave the album a mixed review. Referring to the album track, "Air Bud", he wrote, "A guitar-obsessed longhair who got his start self-distributing his music, Vile has let the outside in – even if a basketball-playing dog from an old DVD still proves to be his best inspiration." Similarly, PopMatters's Robin Smith stated, "This isn’t his clearest work, nor is it his most pretty, but it’s easy to identify him as he looks inward, to see the songwriter who wants to make five different types of music. [...] It’s not that he couldn’t care less. It’s just hard to know how, sometimes."

=== Accolades ===
On May 28, 2013, Spin listed the track, "KV Crimes", at number twelve on their "The 40 Best Songs of 2013 So Far" list, stating: "A shaggy-dog exploration of a riff that could've howled or seared or gotten increasingly heavier as Vile declares, "I think I'm ready to claim what's mine." But instead, it wanders around and around lost in a mood until he starts a verse with "crestfallennnnnnnn," like he might fall asleep before the end of the song, and you realize this whole claiming-what's-mine business is, well, not exactly what it's all cracked up to be."

Stereogum's ranked Wakin on a Pretty Daze at number thirteen on their "The 50 Best Albums of 2013" list, stating: "Vile has grown more and more confident with his gifts since we first met him a few years ago, and here, he's achieved a meandering, zoned-out, thoughtful nirvana state." NME listed the album at number thirty-seven on its "50 Best Albums Of 2013", writing: "This album, bookended by two monstrous tracks ("Wakin’ On A Pretty Day" and "Goldtone") that hovered around the 10-minute mark, distilled his ability to take a single, simple musical idea and stretch it into hypnotic mega-jams." Despite initially giving the album a mixed review, Rolling Stone ranked the album at number thirty-eight on their "50 Best Albums of 2013" list, stating: "The fifth LP from the resplendently mellow Vile is a beautiful sinkhole of meditative guitar mysticism."

Album Critics' lists
Publication	Rank	List
Consequence of Sound	5	Top 50 Albums of 2013
Drowned in Sound	52	DiS Albums of the Year
Magnet	16	MAGNET's Top 25 Albums of 2013
NME	37	NME's 50 Best Albums Of 2013
Pitchfork	13	Top 50 Albums of 2013
Q	36	Q's 50 Albums of the Year
Rolling Stone	38	50 Best Albums of 2013
Slant Magazine	13	The 25 Best Albums of 2013
Spin	10	SPIN's 50 Best Albums of 2013
Still in Rock	9	20 Best Albums of 2013
Stereogum	13	The 50 Best Albums of 2013
Time Out	31	50 Best Albums of 2013
Uncut	8	Uncut's Top 50 Albums of 2013

"KV Crimes"
Publication	Rank	List
Spin	12	The 40 Best Songs of 2013 So Far

== Track listing ==
All tracks are written by Kurt Vile.

No.	Title	Length
1.	"Wakin on a Pretty Day"	9:31
2.	"KV Crimes"	3:57
3.	"Was All Talk"	7:42
4.	"Girl Called Alex"	6:20
5.	"Never Run Away"	3:25
6.	"Pure Pain"	5:09
7.	"Too Hard"	8:04
8.	"Shame Chamber"	4:47
9.	"Snowflakes Are Dancing"	3:23
10.	"Air Bud"	6:30
11.	"Goldtone"	10:26

== Personnel ==
=== Kurt Vile & the Violators ===
- Kurt Vile – vocals, acoustic and electric guitars, lead guitar (1, 4), electric slide guitar (8, 11), synths (1, 3, 10), organ (4, 11), wurlitzer (8, 10), keyboards (3), tambourine (4), percussion (9), vibes (11)
- Jesse Trbovich – electric guitar (1, 2, 3, 4, 9), lead guitar (7), arpeggio guitar (4), slide guitar (11), saxophone (4)
- Rob Laakso – bass guitar (1, 2, 3, 6, 7, 10, 11), electric 12-string guitar (1), EBow guitar (3), fuzz and swell guitars (4), ambient guitars (7), lead electric guitar (8), baritone guitar (8, 11), tremolo fuzz guitars (10), tap guitar outro (11), ARP 2600 (1), additional drums (1), percussion (2), drum machine (6, 10), sequencer (3, 10), electronics (3)

=== Additional musicians ===
- Stella Mozgawa – drums (1, 3, 4, 5, 8, 11), waltz drums (6), percussion (5, 8), cowbell (8)
- Vince Nudo – drums (2, 10)
- Michael Johnson – drums (9), medieval drums (6), synth (9), Korg MS-10 (1)
- Farmer Dave Scher – lap steel guitar (4, 6, 7, 11), melodica (3, 9, 11), wurlitzer (4, 6)
- Jennifer Herrema – backing vocals (7)
- Emily Kokal – backing vocals (11)
- Jeremy Earl – percussion (11)
- Dan Park – percussion (3)
- Alan Pavlica – white noise (4)
- Mary Lattimore – harp (6)

=== Recording ===
- John Agnello – producer, engineer, mixing
- Kurt Vile & the Violators – producer
- Rob Laakso – producer and engineer (2, 10)
- Ted Young – assistant engineer and additional engineering, mixing (10)
- Matt Boynston – mixing (8), additional recording (2, 10)
- Bryce Gonzales – assistant engineer
- Jonathan Low – assistant engineer
- Greg Calbi – mastering
- Steve Fallone – mastering assistant

=== Artwork ===
- Steve Powers – mural art
- Adam Wallacavage – front cover and additional wall photographs
- Shawn Brackbill – band photographs and additional psychedelic images
- Mandy Lamb – recording studio photographs
- Nick Kulp – layout

== Charts ==
Chart performance for Wakin on a Pretty Daze
Chart (2013)	Peak position
Belgian Albums (Ultratop Flanders)	23
Belgian Albums (Ultratop Wallonia)	81
Danish Albums (Hitlisten)	33
Dutch Albums (Album Top 100)	53
Finnish Albums (Suomen virallinen lista)	40
Irish Albums (IRMA)	33
Norwegian Albums (VG-lista)	21
Swedish Albums (Sverigetopplistan)	25
Swiss Albums (Schweizer Hitparade)	64
UK Albums (OCC)	41
US Billboard 200	47
US Independent Albums (Billboard)	8
US Top Alternative Albums (Billboard)	8
US Top Rock Albums (Billboard)	13
