= Philadelphia's Been Good to Me =

Studio album by Kurt Vile
- Released: May 29, 2026
- Studios: OKV Central (Philadelphia); Mant; Ronnie Jonesound (Athens); Easley McCain (Memphis); Tarquin (Connecticut)
- Length: 64:35
- Label: Verve Forecast
- Producers: Matthew Jugenheimer; Adam Langellotti; Kurt Vile; The Violators

Kurt Vile chronology
Back to Moon Beach (2023)	Philadelphia's Been Good to Me (2026)

Singles from Philadelphia's Been Good to Me
- 1. "Chance to Bleed" Released: April 7, 2026; 2. "Zoom 97" Released: May 5, 2026

Philadelphia's Been Good to Me (stylised in sentence case) is the tenth studio album by the American indie rock musician Kurt Vile, released on May 29, 2026, on Verve Forecast Records. The album is Vile's first to be recorded and released after the death of his longtime collaborator and bandmate Rob Laakso.

The album's release was preceded by the singles "Zoom 97" and "Chance to Bleed".

The album cover features a previously unseen photograph by William Eggleston.

== Background and recording ==
The album was largely recorded in Vile's home studio, OKV Central, located in Mount Airy, Philadelphia. He describes the album as his "bringing it all back home to Philly' record", and that he treated the recording process like it was his last album.

== Track listing ==
All tracks are written by Kurt Vile. Track listing and credits are adapted from the album's liner notes and Spotify.

Philadelphia's Been Good to Me track listing
No.	Title	Producer(s)	Length
1.	"Zoom 97"	Kurt Vile; Adam Langellotti; Matthew Jugenheimer	4:54
2.	"99 BPM"	Vile; Langellotti; Jugenheimer	4:45
3.	"Rock o' Stone"	Vile; The Violators; Rob Schnapf^{[a]}	5:35
4.	"You Don't Know Cuz It's My Life"	Vile; The Violators; Schnapf^{[a]}	5:38
5.	"Chance to Bleed"	Kurt Vile and the Violators; Schnapf^{[a]}	4:56
6.	"Philly's Been Good to Me"	Vile; Langellotti; Jugenheimer; Schnapf^{[a]}	5:51
7.	"99th Song"	Vile; The Violators; Schnapf^{[a]}	10:11
8.	"Red Room Dub"	Vile	3:16
9.	"Holiday OKV"	Vile; Langellotti; Jugenheimer	4:33
10.	"Every Time I Look at You"	Vile; The Violators	5:02
11.	"Piano for Sarah"	Vile	2:35
12.	"Avalanches of Snow"	Vile; Langellotti; Jugenheimer	7:19
Total length:			64:35

=== Note ===
- ^{^[a]} indicates an additional producer
- Tracks 4, 6, 7, and 10 are stylised in sentence case.

== Personnel ==
Credits are adapted from the album's liner notes.

=== Kurt Vile and the Violators ===
- Kurt Vile – vocals (tracks 1–7, 9, 10, 12), engineering (1–4, 6, 8, 11), mixing assistance (1–4, 12), synthesizers (1, 4, 6, 8, 9, 12), electric guitar (1, 4, 8, 9, 11), Gold Tone mandolin guitar (1), lead electric guitar (2–7, 10, 12), acoustic guitar (2, 3, 6, 10), keyboards (4, 7, 12), 12-string electric guitar (4), additional mixing (8), lead guitar (9), piano (11), trumpet (12), art direction
- Jesse Trbovich – backing vocals (1), electric rhythm guitar (2–4, 7, 10), space arpeggio guitar (6), electric guitar (8, 9, 12)
- Kyle Spence – drums (3–5, 7, 8, 10), engineering (3, 5)
- Adam Langellotti – bass (all tracks), engineering (1–4, 9–12), mixing (1–4, 12), engineering assistance (8), drums (9, 12), electronics (12)
- Matthew Jugenheimer – engineering (1–4, 6, 9–11), mixing assistance (1–4, 12), Wurlitzer (1, 5), keyboards (2), piano (3), electric piano (4, 7, 10), percussion (4, 10), organ (6), engineering assistance (8), hi-hat (9); bell percussion, claps (12)

=== Additional contributors ===
- Jessica Thompson – mastering
- Mikel Patrick Avery – percussion (1, 6), drums (1)
- Rob Schnapf – engineering (2–4, 6, 10), additional mixing (2, 12), additional recording (3), shaker (4), mixing (5–7, 9–11), additional mixing assistance (8)
- Matt Schuessler – engineering (2, 3, 6, 7, 10)
- Sarah Jones – drums (2, 6, 11)
- Farmer Dave Scher – lap steel (3, 7), space piano (6), synthesizer (7)
- Francie Medosch – backing vocals (3, 12)
- Jon Cox – backing vocals (3, 12)
- Matt Qualls – engineering (4, 5, 7, 10)
- Doug Easley – engineering assistance (4, 5, 7, 10)
- Zoe Duran – engineering assistance (4, 5, 7, 10)
- Brian Rosemeyer – engineering (5, 7, 9)
- Greg Cartwright – lead electric guitar, vocals (5)
- Natalie Hoffmann – background vocals (5)
- Ethan Buckler – additional vocals (5)
- Eliann Tulve – background vocals (7)
- Rob Laakso – bass, keyboards (8)
- Greg Giorgio – engineering (8)
- Peter Katis – mixing (8)
- Steve Gunn – electric guitar (9)
- William Eggleston – cover photograph
- Perry Shall – front cover design
- D. Norsen – album design
- Jacob Speis – additional design

== Charts ==
Chart performance for Philadelphia's Been Good to Me
Chart (2026)	Peak position
Belgian Albums (Ultratop Flanders)	46
Belgian Albums (Ultratop Wallonia)	118
Croatian International Albums (HDU)	29
French Physical Albums (SNEP)	62
French Rock & Metal Albums (SNEP)	9
Scottish Albums (Official Charts)	16
UK Albums Sales (OCC)	17
UK Americana Albums (Official Charts)	5
US Top Album Sales (Billboard)	27
