= Loading Zones =

Single by Kurt Vile

from the album Bottle It In
- Released: August 16, 2018
- Length: 3:23
- Label: Matador
- Songwriter: Kurt Vile
- Producers: Kurt Vile, The Violators, Peter Katis

Kurt Vile singles chronology
"I'm an Outlaw" (2016)	"Loading Zones" (2018)	"Bassackwards" (2018)

Music video
- "Loading Zones" on YouTube

"Loading Zones" is a song by American indie rock musician Kurt Vile, released as the first single from his 2018 album Bottle It In. Though the song's title refers to Vile's bragging about his skill at parking in restricted areas without receiving a parking ticket, it is more generally an ode to his hometown of Lansdowne, Pennsylvania.

== Background and writing ==
Kurt Vile wrote the song during the recording sessions for B'lieve I'm Goin Down..., but would not record it until more than two years later. He wrote the song as an ode to his hometown. The lines "Sure they knighted me yesterday" and "by mayoral decree" refer to his being given the key to the city.

Vile said that the song's various metaphors are very loose and "not too scientific".

== Critical reception ==
The song was acclaimed by Rolling Stone for its "layered guitar gorgeousness" that sounds like "a meld of languid gothic-folk fingerpicking, watery strumming and some weirdly soulful talkboxy wah-wah jive that suggests Joe Walsh by way of Future". Pitchfork expressed approval for the optimistic and easily identifiable lyrics, as well as the "low-key psychedelic riffage."

== Promotion ==
Vile promoted the release of the song by mailing fans envelopes marked "Violators" that contained fake parking tickets. Some were also placed on car windshields.

== Music video ==
The music video was released on August 16, 2018, and features Vile driving around Philadelphia, where he was raised, eluding the meter maids in comedic fashion. The meter maids were played by American actor Kevin Corrigan and Pissed Jeans frontman Matt Korvette, and the video was directed by Drew Saracco.

== Personnel ==
- Kurt Vile - lead and backing vocals, electric and acoustic guitars, harmonica

The Violators

- Rob Laakso - bass, Farfisa synthesizer, backing vocal
- Kyle Spence - drums
- Jesse Trbovich - electric guitar

Additional musicians

- Joe Kennedy - backing vocal
- Eric D. Johnson - backing vocal
- Margaret Yen - backing vocal
- Farrah Katina - backing vocal
- Robert Robinson - backing vocal

== Charts ==
Chart (2018)	Peak position
Belgium (Ultratip Bubbling Under Flanders)	28
US Adult Alternative Airplay (Billboard)	4
