= Arm's Length (song) =

2025 single by Sam Fender

Single by Sam Fender

from the album People Watching
- Released: 24 January 2025
- Genre: Pop
- Length: 3:59
- Label: Polydor
- Songwriter: Sam Fender
- Producers: Sam Fender; Adam Granduciel; Markus Dravs; Joe Atkinson; Dean Thompson

Sam Fender singles chronology
"Wild Long Lie" (2024)	"Arm's Length" (2025)	"Remember My Name" (2025)

Music video
- "People Watching" on YouTube

"Arm's Length" is a song by English singer-songwriter Sam Fender. It was released on 24 January 2025 as the third single from his third studio album, People Watching, and was written by Fender and produced by him alongside Adam Granduciel, Markus Dravs, Joe Atkinson, and Dean Thompson.

== Background ==
According to Fender, the song “originally came from one of those magic moments where you’re just messing around, and a song literally falls out of the sky. It’s about being avoidant and flighty. But also, just a simple pop song, which I love”. He later revealed that the track was almost cut from the album, explaining that his friend and bandmate Brooke Bentham convinced him to keep it.

== Charts ==
Weekly chart performance for "Arm's Length"
Chart (2025)	Peak position
Ireland (IRMA)	46
Netherlands Airplay (MegaCharts)	30
New Zealand Hot Singles (RMNZ)	25
UK Singles (Official Charts)	14

== Certifications ==
Certifications for "Arm's Length"
Region	Certification	Certified units/sales
United Kingdom (BPI)	Gold	400,000^{‡}
^{‡} Sales+streaming figures based on certification alone.
