= Lotta Sea Lice =

Studio album by Courtney Barnett and Kurt Vile
- Released: October 13, 2017
- Recorded: January 4, 2016 – March 8, 2017
- Studios: Newmarket (North Melbourne, Victoria, Australia)
- Genre: Alternative rock
- Length: 44:33
- Labels: Matador, Marathon Artists, Milk!

Courtney Barnett chronology
| Sometimes I Sit and Think, and Sometimes I Just Sit (2015) | Lotta Sea Lice (2017) | Tell Me How You Really Feel (2018) |

Kurt Vile chronology
| B'lieve I'm Goin Down... (2015) | Lotta Sea Lice (2017) | Bottle It In (2018) |

Singles from Lotta Sea Lice
- 1. "Over Everything" Released: August 30, 2017

Lotta Sea Lice is a collaborative studio album between Courtney Barnett and Kurt Vile, released on October 13, 2017, on Matador, Marathon Artists and Milk! Records. The album has received positive critical reviews.

== Recording ==
Barnett and Vile announced that they had jammed together and decided to go on a mutual tour on June 7, 2017. They announced the release date and lead single "Over Everything" on August 30.

== Reception ==
Professional ratings
Aggregate scores
| Source | Rating |
|---|---|
| AnyDecentMusic? | 7.6/10 |
| Metacritic | 79/100 |
Review scores
| Source | Rating |
| AllMusic | 3/5 stars |
| The A.V. Club | B |
| Entertainment Weekly | A− |
| The Guardian | 4/5 stars |
| The Irish Times | 4/5 stars |
| Mojo | 4/5 stars |
| Pitchfork | 7.6/10 |
| Rolling Stone | 3.5/5 stars |
| The Times | 4/5 stars |
| Uncut | 8/10 |

The album received three out of five stars from AllMusic's Stephen Thomas Erlewine, who praised some of the performance and fun of the album but concluded, "As they're both charismatic singers with a way with an elliptical melody, it's pleasant enough, but by the time its 45 minutes wrap up, Lotta Sea Lice feels like a party where the hosts are having a much better time than their guests."

=== Year-end lists ===
| Publication | List | Rank | Ref. |
|---|---|---|---|
| BBC Radio 6 Music | Albums of the Year 2017 | 6 | |
| Drowned in Sound | Favourite Albums of 2017 | 86 | |
| Flood | Best Albums of 2017 | 9 | |
| Fopp | Best Albums of 2017 | 3 | |
| Mojo | Top 50 Albums of 2017 | 16 | |
| Noisey | 100 Best Albums of 2017 | 29 | |
| Paste | 50 Best Albums of 2017 | 5 | |
| Piccadilly Records | Top 100 Albums of 2017 | 28 | |
| Rolling Stone | 50 Best Albums of 2017 | 15 | |
| Rough Trade | Albums of the year 2017 | 35 | |
| Uncut | 75 Best Albums of 2017 | 8 | |
| Uproxx | Best Albums of 2017 | 19 | |

== Track listing ==
| No. | Title | Writer(s) | Length |
|---|---|---|---|
| 1. | "Over Everything" | Kurt Vile | 6:20 |
| 2. | "Let It Go" | Courtney Barnett | 4:34 |
| 3. | "Fear Is Like A Forest" | Jen Cloher | 4:48 |
| 4. | "Outta The Woodwork" | Barnett | 6:21 |
| 5. | "Continental Breakfast" | Vile | 4:54 |
| 6. | "On Script" | Barnett | 4:00 |
| 7. | "Blue Cheese" | Vile | 4:38 |
| 8. | "Peepin’ Tom" | Vile | 4:15 |
| 9. | "Untogether" | Tanya Donelly | 4:51 |
| Total length: | | | 44:41 |

== Personnel ==
- Courtney Barnett – vocals, guitars, piano
- Kurt Vile – vocals, guitars
- Mick Harvey – guitars, keyboards
- Rob Laakso – bass guitar, bass VI, baritone guitar, keyboards
- Alex Landragin – guitars
- Jade McInally – backing vocals
- Stella Mozgawa – drums
- Dave Mudie – drums, backing vocals
- Jess Ribeiro – guitars, backing vocals
- Bones Sloane – bass guitar, backing vocals
- Mick Turner – guitars
- Jim White – drums

Technical

- Callum Barter – mixing, engineering
- Greg Calbi – mastering

== Tour dates ==
The duo assembled a backing band called The Sea Lice composed of Janet Weiss, Stella Mozgawa, Rob Laakso, and Katie Harkin. Jen Cloher was the opening act for all dates, starting on October 11, 2017, at the House of Blues in San Diego, California, and ending the following November 11 at the Moody Theater in Austin, Texas for the Austin City Limits television program. For every ticket sale, one dollar was donated to the American Civil Liberties Union.

== Charts ==
| Chart (2017) | Peak position |
|---|---|
| Australian Albums (ARIA) | 5 |
| Belgian Albums (Ultratop Flanders) | 26 |
| Belgian Albums (Ultratop Wallonia) | 89 |
| Canadian Albums (Billboard) | 92 |
| Dutch Albums (Album Top 100) | 27 |
| French Albums (SNEP) | 89 |
| German Albums (Offizielle Top 100) | 75 |
| Irish Albums (IRMA) | 36 |
| New Zealand Albums (RMNZ) | 12 |
| Portuguese Albums (AFP) | 39 |
| Scottish Albums (Official Charts) | 8 |
| Spanish Albums (Promusicae) | 69 |
| Swiss Albums (Schweizer Hitparade) | 35 |
| UK Albums (Official Charts) | 11 |
| US Billboard 200 | 51 |
| US Top Alternative Albums (Billboard) | 10 |
| US Top Rock Albums (Billboard) | 10 |
| US Independent Albums (Billboard) | 4 |
