= Smoke Ring for My Halo =

Studio album by Kurt Vile
- Released: March 8, 2011
- Recorded: March 2010 – May 2010
- Genre: Indie rock; lo-fi
- Length: 45:48
- Label: Matador
- Producer: John Agnello; Kurt Vile & the Violators

Kurt Vile chronology
Square Shells (2010)	Smoke Ring for My Halo (2011)	So Outta Reach (2011)

Professional ratings
Aggregate scores
Source	Rating
AnyDecentMusic?	7.5/10
Metacritic	82/100
Review scores
Source	Rating
AllMusic	4/5 stars
The A.V. Club	B+
The Boston Phoenix	3/4 stars
Mojo	4/5 stars
NME	8/10
Pitchfork	8.4/10
Q	4/5 stars
Rolling Stone	4/5 stars
Spin	9/10
Uncut	4/5 stars

Smoke Ring for My Halo is the fourth studio album by American indie rock musician Kurt Vile, released on March 8, 2011, on Matador. A deluxe edition was released in November 2011, including the subsequent EP, So Outta Reach (2011). The album was produced by John Agnello, Kurt Vile and his backing band, the Violators. Regarding the album's lyrical content, Vile stated: "It’s just me and those thoughts you have late at night when nobody is around. It is more a feeling than a statement – a general wandering feeling. It’s kind of a wandering record."

The album was released to critical acclaim upon its release, with Mojo placing the album at No. 12 on its "Top 50 albums of 2011" list, while Uncut placed the album at number 14 and Pitchfork placed the album at number 16.

== Background and recording ==
Following the release of Childish Prodigy (2009), Vile and his backing band, the Violators, embarked upon an extensive tour, with Vile stating, "There has been a lot of touring and more growing – more than people might know." The tour was the first to feature the full Violators line-up, with Vile noting, "[It was the] first time the full band could come along. We had kind of a shitty rental van and it was the first time we were all together for that long. At points it was like Lord of the Flies, everyone ready to eat each other up, and then we're suddenly like best friends again. And we still are best friends."

The band subsequently entered the studio with producer John Agnello. Comparing Smoke Ring for Halo's sessions to his previous studio album, Vile stated, "With Childish Prodigy, I had made a whole record not knowing where I was going – it was me in my studio, somewhere between lo-fi and, maybe not super, hi-fi. [...] I wanted to have a concept of this album being a statement as a whole, as opposed a little bit from here and a little bit from there. It shows a kind of introspective folk side more, while still being into rock. It doesn't capture my whole sound, but it captures part of my sound and is more concise as a record."

During the album's initial recording sessions, Vile attempted to record "kind of trance-like, Appalachian folk-style songs [...] and at the time it was too rushed, and I still hadn't nailed it. I attempted to get these tunes down, but they aren't ready yet." The final two songs to be recorded for the album were "Society Is My Friend and "Puppet to the Man", with Vile stating: "Matador did say, 'It's great, but there aren't any rockers on it.' So I [went] back in and recorded a couple rockers, which I'm glad I did. "Society Is My Friend" and "Puppet to the Man" – I recorded them at the end."

Reflecting upon the album in 2013, Vile stated, "I proved myself with Smoke Ring. It was me maturing. I made a good pop record. And all the songs were me, but that was like a growing record. Growing in a lot of ways. But it didn't feel exactly me. I wasn't entirely comfortable or experienced with the scenario, and I feel that [subsequent album, Wakin on a Pretty Daze] is just 100% my voice all the time."

As of January 2012 UK sales stand at 14,000 copies according to The Guardian.

== Writing and composition ==
Much of the album's material was written on an acoustic guitar, with Vile stating, "I bought a new Martin guitar at the time and I was using at home to get ready to record and it came out real acoustic."

Regarding the religious connotations of the album's second track, "Jesus Fever", Vile stated, "My family was religious – I am not particularly practicing religion myself but I was definitely exposed to it. They were super-religious but not like over-the-top to the point it turns negative. But, it is also kind of a gospel thing – back to old music. The Rolling Stones and Spacemen 3 tap into that religious thing really well, as it is kind of a blues-gospel thing. So, it is a combination of coming from a religious family and that musical lineage."

"Ghost Town" was previously released as "Sad Ghost," a B-side on the single release of "In My Time." The song "Runners-up" contains some of the same lyrics as the song "Red Apples" from the album, God Is Saying This to You... (2009).

== Accolades ==
Critics' lists
Publication	Country	Accolade	Rank
NME	UK	50 Best Albums of 2011	5
Mojo	UK	Albums of the Year	12
Paste	US	Paste's Top 50 Albums of 2011	44
Pitchfork	US	The Top 50 Albums of 2011	16
PopMatters	US	The 75 Best Albums of 2011	11
Q	UK	Q's 50 Best Albums of 2011	16
Rolling Stone	US	Rolling Stone Best Albums 2011	39
Spin	US	SPIN's 50 Best Albums of 2011	4
Stereogum	US	Stereogum's Top 50 Albums of 2011	34
Uncut	UK	Uncut's Top 50 Albums of 2011	14
gogoyoko	ICL	gogoyoko albums of the year 2011	1

== Track listing ==
All tracks are written by Kurt Vile, except where noted.

No.	Title	Length
1.	"Baby's Arms"	3:56
2.	"Jesus Fever"	3:46
3.	"Puppet to the Man" (Vile/Granduciel)	3:52
4.	"On Tour"	5:26
5.	"Society Is My Friend"	5:39
6.	"Runner Ups"	4:00
7.	"In My Time"	3:47
8.	"Peeping Tomboy"	4:24
9.	"Smoke Ring for My Halo"	4:35
10.	"Ghost Town"	6:23
11.	"(shell blues)" (hidden track)	1:01

=== So Outta Reach EP ===
A deluxe edition of the album was released including the subsequent EP, So Outta Reach.

1. "The Creature"
2. "It's Alright"
3. "Life's a Beach"
4. "Laughing Stock"
5. "Downbound Train" (Bruce Springsteen cover)
6. "(so outta reach)"

== Personnel ==
=== Kurt Vile and the Violators ===
- Kurt Vile – vocals, guitars, sequencer (1), synths (2 and 5), piano (2 and 9), Korg (3 and 10), Mellotron (4), Farfisa (7)
- Adam Granduciel – electric guitar (3, 5 and 9), lead acoustic guitar (6), tremolo guitar (10), bass guitar (3), Mellotron (4), percussion (7)
- Jesse Trbovich – bass guitar (2 and 9), slide guitar (3), electric guitar (6), vibrato guitar (9), feedback guitar (10)
- Mike Zanghi – drums (3 4, 5, 6, 7 and 10), percussion (1, 3, 6 and 9)

=== Additional musicians ===
- Mike Polizze – bass guitar (1, 4 and 10)
- Lea Cho – ambient keys (1), piano (4), keyboards (10)
- Mary Lattimore – harp (4 and 10)
- Rob Laakso – Arp 2600 (1)
- Meg Baird – backing vocals (1)
- Michael Johnson – drums (2)
- John Agnello – vibro slaps (6)

=== Recording personnel ===
- John Agnello – producer, recording engineer, mixing, overdubs (2 and 7)
- Kurt Vile & the Violators – producer
- Jeff Zeigler – recording engineer (2 and 7)
- Ted Young – assistant engineer
- Jonathan Low – assistant engineer
- Matt Boynton – mixing (3)
- Rob Laakso – mixing (3)
- Greg Calbi – mastering

=== Artwork ===
- Shawn Brackbill – band photographs
- Michael Ast – dumpster photograph

== Charts ==
Chart performance for Smoke Ring for My Halo
Chart (2011)	Peak position
US Billboard 200	154
US Independent Albums (Billboard)	8
US Top Alternative Albums (Billboard)	24
US Top Rock Albums (Billboard)	38
