= He's Alright =

Single by Kurt Vile

from the album Childish Prodigy
- B-side: "Farfisas in Falltime" & "Take Your Time"
- Released: September 8, 2009
- Genre: Indie rock
- Label: Matador Records
- Songwriter: Kurt Vile
- Producers: Kurt Vile, Jeff Zeigler, Adam Granduciel

Kurt Vile singles chronology
"He's Alright" (2009)	"Pretty Pimpin" (2015)

"He's Alright" is a limited-edition vinyl single by American indie rock musician Kurt Vile, released on September 8, 2009, on Matador Records. The song appears on Vile's third studio album, Childish Prodigy (2009), as a hidden track.

The b-side, "Farfisas in Falltime", is an ambient instrumental recorded by Violators bandmate and frequent collaborator Adam Granduciel, while "Take Your Time" is an acoustic track recorded with Childish Prodigy producer Jeff Zeigler.

The song appears in the season two finale of HBO's comedy series, Eastbound and Down. Regarding its appearance, Vile noted, "That was really awesome. It was in this cool, emotional part at the end of the season, and I got so lucky to have my song on there, because the song is kind of emotional too."

== Track listing ==
Side A

1. "He's Alright"

Side B

1. "Farfisas in Falltime"
2. "Take Your Time"

== Personnel ==
=== Musicians ===
- Kurt Vile - vocals, guitar
- Jesse Trbovich - vibrato guitars ("He's Alright")

=== Recording personnel ===
- Jeff Zeigler - recording ("He's Alright" and "Take Your Time")
- Adam Granduciel - recording ("Farfisas in Falltime")
