= Remember My Name =

Remember My Name may refer to:

- Remember My Name (film), a 1978 American dramatic thriller
- Remember My Name, a 2015 album by Lil Durk, or the title song
- "Remember My Name", a song by Chris Brown, from the album Fortune
- "Remember My Name", a song by Mitski, from the album Be the Cowboy
- "Remember My Name" (Sam Fender song), from the album People Watching
