= Easington Colliery Band =

English brass band

Easington Colliery Band is a British brass band founded in 1915 and based in the village of Easington Colliery, County Durham, England. It was the band of Easington's colliery until the mine's closure in 1993. The band plays in the Championship section, and was North of England champion in 2024, representing the region at the National Brass Band Championships of Great Britain.

The band is sponsored by entrepreneur Michael Watt.

== Collaborations ==
In 2017, the band joined Eurythmics co-founder Dave Stewart on stage for his 65th anniversary concert at the Sunderland Empire.

In 2022 they accompanied the band LYR, including Poet Laureate Simon Armitage and singer-songwriter Richard Walters, in a project entitled 'Firm as a Rock', sponsored by Durham Festival of Brass and debuted in Durham Cathedral. They teamed up again with LYR for 'Firm as a Rock', presented in 2025 at Durham Miners' Hall.

In 2023, the band played on Newcastle-upon-Tyne singer-songwriter Sam Fender's song "Remember My Name", the fourth single released from his Mercury Prize-winning 2025 album People Watching. This was followed by the band accompanying Fender on stage at concerts in London Stadium and St James' Park, Newcastle, playing to a total of 230,000 people. They reunited with Fender in 2026 to play on his cover of the Rolling Stones' You Can't Always Get What You Want, used for that year's John Lewis Christmas advert.
