= The Hunchback (EP) =

EP by Kurt Vile & the Violators
- Released: April 13, 2009 (original release); January 22, 2013 (re-release)
- Recorded: Adam Granduciel's home, Philadelphia, 2008; Uniform Recording, Philadelphia; Underhouse Studios
- Genre: Lo-fi, Indie rock
- Language: English
- Label: Richie Records
- Producer: Adam Granduciel

Kurt Vile & the Violators chronology
God Is Saying This to You... (2009)	The Hunchback (2009)	Childish Prodigy (2009)

The Hunchback EP is an EP by American indie rock band Kurt Vile & the Violators, released on April 13, 2009 on Richie Records, and subsequently re-released on January 22, 2013. Produced and recorded by guitarist Adam Granduciel, the EP preceded the release of Vile's third studio album, Childish Prodigy (2009), and is the first to be credited to both Vile and his backing band.

== Background and recording ==
The EP's title track, "The Hunchback", subsequently appeared on Vile's third studio album, Childish Prodigy (2009), with Vile noting: "The one on the EP is a jammier version, and it's more what ended up being the live version - it all shows that music is ever-changing. It's only a snapshot, you know what I mean? People might think that there's only one version in the world, but really it's always changing over time."

The track, "Losing It", reappears on Vile's 2010 EP, Square Shells, in a different state.

== Release ==
After its initial limited run, the EP was subsequently re-released with six live bonus tracks, recorded at the Earl, in Atlanta, on August 7, 2011. A concert Pitchfork described as "the final show featuring the classic lineup of the Violators."

A press release upon the EP's reissue described the release as "Kurt’s first big step into big rock, originally released in 2009 & sold out quickly over the course of a few trips across the USA. Full-on electric & an essential piece of the puzzle [...] Fans of Kurt Vile’s previous work cried into their pillows and accused him of selling out the bedroom rock scene, while the initiated few knew he’d been doing it for years… plugging in with a full-on rock band called The Violators and gigging in all corners of Philly."

== Track listing ==
1. "The Hunchback"
2. "Damn You"
3. "Losing It"
4. "Hunchy's Back"
5. "Good Lookin Out"
6. "Slick Licks"

2013 reissue live bonus tracks

1. "On Tour" (live)
2. "Jesus Fever" (live)
3. "Freeway" (live)
4. "The Hunchback" (live)
5. "Freak Train" (live, featuring Bradford Cox)
6. "Peeping Tomboy" (live)

== Personnel ==
=== Kurt Vile & the Violators ===
- Kurt Vile - vocals, lead electric guitar, filter guitars, harmonica, sampler
- Adam Granduciel - baritone guitars, bass guitar, Casio
- Jesse Trbovich - rodeo guitar, slide guitar, fuzz guitar
- Mike Zanghi - drums, percussion

=== Recording personnel ===
- Adam Granduciel - recording, mixing
- Jeff Zeigler - recording (5), vocal overdub recording (1), additional mixing
- Dave Parks - vocal recording (5)
