= People Watching (album) =

Studio album by Sam Fender
- Released: 21 February 2025
- Recorded: January 2022 – October 2024
- Genres: Heartland rock; pop
- Length: 48:32
- Label: Polydor
- Producers: Adam Granduciel; Markus Dravs; Sam Fender; Dean Thompson; Joe Atkinson

Sam Fender chronology
Seventeen Going Under (2021)	People Watching (2025)

Singles from People Watching
- 1. "People Watching" Released: 15 November 2024; 2. "Wild Long Lie" Released: 2 December 2024; 3. "Arm's Length" Released: 24 January 2025; 4. "Remember My Name" Released: 14 February 2025; 5. "Little Bit Closer" Released: 21 February 2025; 6. "Rein Me In" Released: 20 June 2025

Singles from People Watching (Deluxe Edition)
- 1. "Me and the Dog" Released: 2 December 2024; 2. "Tyrants" Released: 25 April 2025; 3. "Talk to You" Released: 17 October 2025; 4. "I'm Always on Stage" Released: 21 November 2025

People Watching is the third studio album by English musician Sam Fender, released on 21 February 2025 through Polydor Records. It was co-produced by Adam Granduciel, Markus Dravs, and Fender himself, with additional production from his bandmates, Dean Thompson and Joe Atkinson.

People Watching is a heartland rock and pop album. According to Fender, it explores "colourful stories and observations of everyday characters living their everyday, but often extraordinary, lives." It was supported by the release of six singles, and was met with widespread acclaim from critics. Commercially, it debuted at the top of the UK Albums Chart, and reached the top ten in Austria, Belgium, the Netherlands, Germany, Ireland, and Switzerland. People Watching won the 2025 Mercury Prize.

The album's deluxe edition featuring eight additional tracks, including collaborations with Olivia Dean and Elton John, was released on 5 December, 2025.

== Background and recording ==
On 9 April 2023, Fender was filmed making an impromptu live performance at Newcastle's Prohibition Bar of a song which he announced would be on his forthcoming album, later named as "Remember My Name". On 3 August 2024, he premiered two more songs of the upcoming album during a show at Plymouth Pavilions: "People Watching" and "Nostalgia's Lie". On 13 November 2024, Fender announced his third album "People Watching" ahead of the release of the title track on 15 November 2024.

During the album's recording process, Fender worked with Adam Granduciel, the frontman, founder and producer of the indie rock band The War on Drugs. Regarding working with Fender, Granduciel noted: "I fell in love with him. He’s a savant. Sam and the boys came out in March [2024] for about five weeks. We worked on some stuff they’d already started, then we worked on some more stuff from the ground up. It was awesome. I'd never met Sam, but we’d communicated once or twice. I have this picture above the sink in my kitchen, that I took of the boys. Sam, Joe [Atkinson], Dean [Thompson] and Drew, just hanging out in my studio. They inspire each other. It’s like my band: everyone can just sit there for fifteen hours and just hang. You don’t have a wildcard, everyone’s easy and loose, and musical, and good-hearted. It was a blast working together."

The album's penultimate track, "Something Heavy", features additional vocals from Craig Finn, the frontman of the indie rock band The Hold Steady, with Fender subsequently appearing on Finn's sixth solo album, Always Been, which was released the following month in April 2025. Fender provided backing vocals on the track "Postcards", with both albums being produced by Adam Granduciel concurrently in 2024. The final track and fourth single, "Remember My Name", features Easington Colliery Band, a traditional British brass band from County Durham.

== Artwork ==
The album's artwork features a photograph by the late Tish Murtha, a social documentary photographer who documented marginalised communities and working-class life in Newcastle upon Tyne.

== Commercial performance ==
People Watching debuted atop the UK Albums Chart on 28 February 2025, becoming Fender's third consecutive number one album. It earned Fender the biggest opening week of his career, moving 107,100 chart units in its first seven days of release, the biggest opening week for a British solo artist since Harry Styles's Harry's House (2022). With 43,000 first-week vinyl sales, the album also became the fastest-selling vinyl album by a British act in the 21st century.

== Critical reception ==
People Watching ratings
Aggregate scores
Source	Rating
AnyDecentMusic?	8.1/10
Metacritic	85/100
Review scores
Source	Rating
AllMusic	4/5 stars
Clash	8/10
DIY	5/5 stars
The Guardian	5/5 stars
The Independent	3/5 stars
The Line of Best Fit	7/10
Mojo	4/5 stars
NME	4/5 stars
The Observer	5/5 stars
Pitchfork	6.5/10
Rolling Stone	4/5 stars
The Times	4/5 stars

Upon its release, People Watching received widespread acclaim from critics. On review aggregator Metacritic, the album holds a score of 85 out of 100 based on sixteen critics' reviews, indicating "universal acclaim". In a five-star review in The Observer, Lisa Wright praised the album's honesty, calling it "a lonely document of fame, and of a man clinging on to the community his talents have propelled him away from. And where his previous album revealed Fender to be a songwriter of depth, People Watching explores life’s ugliness and finds excellence." Roisin Kelly, writing for The Sunday Times' 2025 year-end list, also praised its frankness: "In a world where extravagant production, multiple costume changes and dramatic stage stunts often dominate conversation and win social media clout, Fender brings us back to a time where it’s relatability that shines through...this third album is richer in vulnerability and personal struggle." Alexis Petridis of The Guardian, also awarding the album five stars, commended Fender's songwriting: "strong on melodies...handy with a roaring, emotive, arena-friendly chorus, and exceptionally gifted with words".

Critics praised the album's social realist storytelling; Roy Wilkinson of Mojo deemed it "a poignant portrait of post-industrial Britain – one that's meditative rather than defeated", while Sarah Jamieson of DIY, in a rave review, noted it as being "unafraid of delving into both the personal and political - and, at times, where the two very much intertwine... an album that burrows under the skin of current society and refuses to dress up its stark reality." Patrick Gill of PopMatters said, "Fender is surprisingly mature for his age. It took the Killers six records to achieve this level of command", and gave the album a nine out of ten rating. For his 2025 year-end list in The Telegraph, Neil McCormick praised Fender as "almost a lone voice of youthful political protest in the modern chart landscape."

=== Year-end lists ===
Select year-end rankings for People Watching
Publication/critic	List	Rank	Ref.
BBC Radio 6	Albums of the Year	N/A	
Billboard	The 50 Best Albums of 2025	28	
Clash	Albums of the Year	19	
DIY	2025 Albums of the Year	7	
Los Angeles Times	The 25 Best Albums of 2025	13	
NME	The 25 Best Albums of 2025	20	
OOR	The 50 Best Albums of 2025	16	
The Skinny	The Skinny's Albums of 2025	14	
The Sunday Times	The 25 Best Albums of 2025	4	
The Telegraph	The 10 Best Albums of 2025	7	
Us Weekly	The Best Albums of 2025	N/A	

== Accolades ==
On 10 September 2025, People Watching was announced as one of 12 nominees for the 2025 Mercury Prize. It was later announced as the winner on 16 October 2025. Fender later donated the entirety of his £25,000 Mercury Prize winnings to the Music Venue Trust, which works to preserve the UK's grassroots music venues. It was nominated for the Brit Award for British Album of the Year at the 2026 Brit Awards.

== Track listing ==
All tracks are written by Sam Fender, except the remix of "Rein Me In" featuring Olivia Dean, which is written by Fender, Dean, and Max Wolfgang.

People Watching track listing
No.	Title	Producer(s)	Length
1.	"People Watching"	Fender; Adam Granduciel; Joe Atkinson^{[a]}; Dean Thompson^{[a]}	5:04
2.	"Nostalgia's Lie"	Fender; Markus Dravs; Atkinson^{[a]}; Thompson^{[a]}; Granduciel^{[a]}	4:11
3.	"Chin Up"	Fender; Granduciel; Atkinson^{[a]}; Thompson^{[a]}	3:24
4.	"Wild Long Lie"	Fender; Granduciel; Atkinson; Thompson; Granduciel^{[a]}	6:04
5.	"Arm's Length"	Fender; Granduciel; Dravs; Atkinson^{[a]}; Thompson^{[a]}	3:59
6.	"Crumbling Empire"	Fender; Granduciel; Atkinson^{[a]}; Thompson^{[a]}	5:08
7.	"Little Bit Closer"	Fender; Dravs; Atkinson^{[a]}; Thompson^{[a]}	3:55
8.	"Rein Me In"	Fender; Dravs; Atkinson^{[a]}; Thompson^{[a]}; Granduciel^{[a]}	5:40
9.	"TV Dinner"	Fender; Granduciel; Atkinson^{[a]}; Thompson^{[a]}	4:31
10.	"Something Heavy"	Fender; Dravs; Atkinson^{[a]}; Thompson^{[a]}; Granduciel^{[a]}	3:36
11.	"Remember My Name"	Fender; Dravs	3:02
Total length:			48:32

People Watching (Deluxe Edition) track listing
No.	Title	Producer(s)	Length
12.	"I'm Always on Stage"		4:03
13.	"Talk to You" (with Elton John)	Fender; Dravs; Atkinson^{[a]}; Thompson^{[a]}	5:17
14.	"Fortuna's Wheel"		1:42
15.	"Rein Me In" (with Olivia Dean)	Fender; Dravs; Atkinson^{[a]}; Thompson^{[a]}; Granduciel^{[a]}	5:39
16.	"Me and the Dog"		4:14
17.	"Tyrants"	Fender; Granduciel; Atkinson^{[a]}; Thompson^{[a]}	3:15
18.	"The Treadmill"		3:22
19.	"Empty Spaces"		4:54
Total length:			80:55

=== Note ===
- ^{^[a]} signifies an additional producer.

== Personnel ==
=== Musicians ===
- Sam Fender – vocals (all tracks), piano (tracks 1, 4, 6, 8–10); glockenspiel, guitar, keyboards, string arrangement (1); electric guitar (2–10), acoustic guitar (2–8, 10), organ (2, 9), harmonica (5)
- Drew Michael – drums, percussion (tracks 1–10)
- Adam Granduciel – synthesizer (tracks 1, 4), acoustic guitar (2, 6), Wurlitzer electric piano (4), keyboards (5, 6), sequencer (9)
- Joe Atkinson – synthesizer (track 1), keyboards (4–6, 8, 9)
- Mark Webb – trumpet (tracks 1, 9, 11)
- Brooke Bentham – background vocals (track 1), vocals (10)
- Dean Thompson – background vocals, guitar (track 1); mandolin (10)
- Rosie Danvers – conductor, piano, string arrangement (track 1)
- Jon Natchez – baritone saxophone (track 1)
- Tom Ungerer – bass (tracks 1–10)
- Johnny Davis – saxophone (track 1)
- Wired Strings – strings (track 1)
- Johnny "Bluehat" Davis – saxophone (tracks 4, 8)
- Craig Finn – vocals (track 10)
- Easington Colliery Brass Band – brass accompaniment (track 11)

=== Technical ===
- Greg Calbi – mastering
- Steve Fallone – mastering
- Craig Silvey – mixing
- Dani Bennett Spragg – mixing
- Dean Thompson – engineering (tracks 1–10)
- Joe Atkinson – engineering (tracks 1–10)
- Austin Asvanonda – engineering (tracks 1–6, 8–10)
- Iain Berryman – engineering (tracks 2, 4, 5, 7, 8, 10, 11)
- Oli Jacobs – engineering (tracks 2, 4, 5, 7, 8, 10)
- Brett Cox – engineering (track 11)
- David Kohn – recording, engineering assistance (tracks 1–6, 8–10)
- Claude Vause – recording, engineering assistance (tracks 2, 4–8, 10)
- Tom Coath – recording, engineering assistance (tracks 2, 4–8, 10)
- Adam Forster – recording, engineering assistance (track 11)

== Charts ==
=== Weekly charts ===
Weekly chart performance for People Watching
Chart (2025)	Peak position
Australian Albums (ARIA)	17
Austrian Albums (Ö3 Austria)	9
Belgian Albums (Ultratop Flanders)	2
Belgian Albums (Ultratop Wallonia)	21
Dutch Albums (Album Top 100)	2
French Albums (SNEP)	129
French Rock & Metal Albums (SNEP)	10
German Albums (Offizielle Top 100)	4
Greek Albums (IFPI)	96
Irish Albums (Official Charts)	2
Italian Albums (FIMI)	51
New Zealand Albums (RMNZ)	12
Scottish Albums (Official Charts)	1
Spanish Albums (PROMUSICAE)	80
Swedish Albums (Sverigetopplistan)	58
Swiss Albums (Schweizer Hitparade)	7
UK Albums (Official Charts)	1
US Americana/Folk Albums (Billboard)	21
US Top Album Sales (Billboard)	16
US Top Current Album Sales (Billboard)	13

=== Year-end charts ===
Year-end chart performance for People Watching
Chart (2025)	Position
Belgian Albums (Ultratop Flanders)	86
UK Albums (OCC)	10

== Certifications ==
Certifications for People Watching
Region	Certification	Certified units/sales
Belgium (BRMA)	Gold	10,000^{‡}
New Zealand (RMNZ)	Platinum	15,000^{‡}
United Kingdom (BPI)	Platinum	300,000^{‡}
^{‡} Sales+streaming figures based on certification alone.

== Release history ==
Release dates and formats of People Watching
Region	Release Date	Format	Edition	Label
Various	21 February 2025	Digital download; streaming; cassette; CD; vinyl LP	Standard	Polydor
Various	5 December 2025	Digital download; streaming; CD; vinyl LP	Deluxe Edition	Polydor
