= It's a Big World Out There (And I Am Scared) =

EP by Kurt Vile and the Violators

EP by Kurt Vile and the Violators
- Released: November 13, 2013
- Genre: Indie rock
- Length: 29:26
- Label: Matador
- Producer: Kurt Vile & the Violators, Rob Laakso & John Agnello

Kurt Vile and the Violators chronology
Wakin on a Pretty Daze (2013)	It's a Big World Out There (And I Am Scared) (2013)	b'lieve I'm goin down... (2015)

It's a Big World Out There (And I Am Scared) is an EP by American indie rock band Kurt Vile and the Violators, released on November 19, 2013, on Matador Records. The EP is the second to be credited to both Vile and his backing band, and is included on the deluxe edition of Vile's fifth studio album, Wakin on a Pretty Daze: Deluxe Daze (Post Haze).

Regarding the release, Vile noted: "It's more of like a psychedelic journey that's a companion piece to the style of [Wakin on a Pretty Daze], than an EP that just stands on its own."

== Background and recording ==
It's a Big World Out There (And I Am Scared) was mostly recorded during the same sessions as Kurt Vile's fifth studio album, Wakin on a Pretty Daze, and includes variations on the tracks, "Never Run Away", "Snowflakes Are Dancing" and "Air Bud".

Regarding the track, "Feel My Pain", Vile noted, "[The song is a] stripped-down, ominous folk number, exceptionally meticulous in its finger-picked arrangement, [it] has since become a favorite of mine for all its rawness." He later elaborated: "I always loved ["Feel My Pain"]. And we tried to put that on [Wakin on a Pretty Daze], and we added all these tracks to it, making it more in that epic fashion. But something was lost to me, it seemed like more of a ghostly, stripped-down folk affair. So that was something of substance that I put on [the EP]."

== Track listing ==
No.	Title	Length
1.	"Never Run Away (string synth)"	3:24
2.	"NRA Reprise"	1:33
3.	"Feel My Pain"	6:19
4.	"Snowflakes Extended"	5:41
5.	"Wedding Budz"	4:14
6.	"The Ghost of Freddie Roach"	6:22
7.	"(reprise reprise)"	1:53
Total length:		29:26

== Personnel ==
=== Kurt Vile and the Violators ===
- Kurt Vile – vocals, guitars, synth (1), ARP Odyssey (2), percussion (4), Yamaha CS-50 (5), slide guitar (6), keyboards (6)
- Rob Laakso – bass guitar (1, 3, 5), synth programming (2), linn drums (3), percussion (3), drum machine (5)
- Jesse Trbovich – electric guitar (4)

=== Additional musicians ===
- Vince Nudo – drums (2)
- Stella Mozgawa – drums and percussion (1)
- Michael Johnson – drums and synth (4)
- Farmer Dave Scher – melodica (4)
- John Agnello – drum machine and percussion (6)

=== Artwork ===
- Steve Powers – cover art
- Adam Wallacavage – cover photograph

=== Recording ===
- Kurt Vile – producer
- Rob Laakso – producer (1, 2, 3, 5, 7), overdubbing (1), recording (2, 7), mixing (1, 2, 3, 5, 7), engineer (5)
- John Agnello – producer (4, 6), initial drum and acoustic guitar recording (1), recording (3), engineer and mixing (6)
- The Violators – producer (4)
- Ted Young – assistant engineer
- Bryce Gonzales – assistant engineer
- Jonathan Low – assistant engineer
- Greg Calbi – mastering
- Steve Fallone – mastering assistant
