= Kurt Vile =

American musician (born 1980)

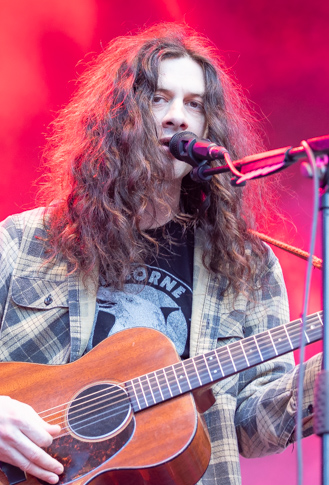
- Vile performing at Piknik i Parken in 2019

Background information
- Born: Kurt Samuel Vile; January 3, 1980 (age 46); Lansdowne, Pennsylvania, United States
- Origin: Philadelphia, Pennsylvania, US
- Genres: Indie rock; folk rock; lo-fi; psychedelic rock
- Occupations: Singer-songwriter; musician
- Instruments: Vocals; guitar; trumpet; banjo; keyboards; harmonica
- Years active: 2003–present
- Labels: Verve; Matador; Gulcher; Mexican Summer; Three Lobed Recordings
- Formerly of: Kurt Vile & the Violators; The War on Drugs

Kurt Samuel Vile (born January 3, 1980) is an American singer, songwriter, multi-instrumentalist, and record producer. He is known for his solo work, music released under the name "Kurt Vile and the Violators", and as the former lead guitarist of rock band the War on Drugs. Both in the studio and during live performances, Vile is accompanied by his backing band, the Violators, which currently includes Jesse Trbovich (guitar, saxophone), Kyle Spence (drums) and Adam Langellotti (bass, keyboards).

Influenced by Pavement, John Prine, Neil Young, Tom Petty, Dinosaur Jr., Bruce Springsteen and John Fahey, Vile began his musical career creating lo-fi home recordings with frequent collaborator Adam Granduciel in Philadelphia, with whom he has participated in early work by the War on Drugs as well as various solo projects. Focusing on his solo career, Vile released two albums, Constant Hitmaker (2008) and God Is Saying This to You... (2009), compiling various home recordings dating back to 2003. Vile signed to Matador Records in 2009, and released his third album, Childish Prodigy, that same year. The album was his first recorded in a studio and with the full participation of the Violators.

In 2011, Vile released his fourth studio album, Smoke Ring for My Halo, which significantly increased his exposure. His fifth studio album, Wakin on a Pretty Daze, was released in 2013, with Rob Laakso replacing Granduciel in his backing band. In 2015, Vile released his sixth studio album, B'lieve I'm Goin Down.... The lead single from the album, "Pretty Pimpin", was Vile's best performing song to date, topping the Billboard Adult Alternative Songs chart in March 2016. His 2017 release, Lotta Sea Lice, is a collaboration with Australian singer and guitarist Courtney Barnett. In 2018, he released his eighth studio album, Bottle It In, followed by a country-influenced EP, Speed, Sound, Lonely KV, in 2020.

Vile's ninth studio album, (watch my moves) (2022), was recorded mostly at a Vile's home studio during COVID-19 lockdowns. In May 2023, his longtime Violators bandmate and recording partner Rob Laakso died from cholangiocarcinoma. That same year, he released the 52-minute-long EP, Back to Moon Beach. Vile's tenth album, Philadelphia's Been Good to Me, was released on May 29, 2026.

== Biography ==
=== 1994–2002: Early life and musical beginnings ===
Vile grew up in Lansdowne, Pennsylvania, a suburb of Philadelphia, and is the third oldest of ten children born to Charles and Donna Vile. Although his surname is occasionally assumed to be a pseudonym and a pun on German composer Kurt Weill, it is his real birth name and the similarity to Weill's name is a coincidence.

At the age of fourteen, Kurt Vile was given a banjo by his father, with Vile noting, "I kind of wished [it] was a guitar. So I'd kind of just play it like a guitar anyway. I was really into writing pretty primitive tunes, and really into recording. I pretty much knew I was going to do music [with my life] then." Vile began writing songs on the banjo, describing his first self-penned track as: "a joke song. It was a good instrumental; I knew all these chords, but then I was quoting a cartoon as the lyrics on top of it. I had seen this cartoon about Superman and Lex Luthor; it was like the back history of why Lex Luthor hated Superman. They used to be friends, and then some giant stone of kryptonite fell and it made Lex Luthor's hair fall out, and he was like, 'You made all my hair fall out!' It was a really stupid cartoon, but that was my song, 'You Made All My Hair Fall Out'."

Three years later, Vile created his first "mass-produced" tape at the age of seventeen. Influenced by Pavement, Beck, Smog and the record label Drag City, Vile noted, "I really thought I could be on Drag City. I really wanted that. I heard these people that made good music but it was still pretty raw, and had this real cult quality."

While working on his home recordings, Vile worked as a forklift driver, from 2000 to 2002. Regarding this time in his life, Vile noted "It was a really fast-paced job, unloading trucks. Though music was my passion, I had a long way to go then and a lot to learn. I got depressed so many times by my blue-collar life, and self-conscious about the fact that I didn't go to college. I was always working super low-end jobs, being the complete opposite of what I wanted to be. But I just fell into it, and I was also sorta shy. It was definitely a pretty rough time."

=== 2003–2008: The War on Drugs and Constant Hitmaker ===
In 2003, after staying in Boston for two years, Vile moved back to Philadelphia, and began collaborating with musician and songwriter Adam Granduciel. The duo subsequently formed the indie rock band The War on Drugs in 2005. Regarding his friendship with Granduciel, Vile noted, "We're essentially best friends. He was backing me up in my band when he started working on his own music, so I thought I'd return the favor." Granduciel and Vile released their debut studio album, Wagonwheel Blues, in 2008 and embarked on a tour in support of its release.

At this time, Vile's debut solo album, Constant Hitmaker (2008), was released on Gulcher Records. Vile subsequently decided to leave The War on Drugs to concentrate on his solo career. The album was compiled from various home recordings and one studio recording of the song "Freeway". In 2009, Vile noted, "The War On Drugs got put out on a bigger label first, so, in the blogosphere, some claim that The War on Drugs was my first, main band. But that's just the way it looks. I've made more music than Adam has, and have been doing my Kurt Vile thing for a little bit longer. And Constant Hitmaker came out around that same time. Right when that [War on Drugs] record came out, I went to Europe with them, and also opened as Kurt Vile. That was right when I decided I wanted to concentrate on doing my own thing." Despite Vile's departure, Granduciel remained a member of his backing band, The Violators, with Granduciel noting, "There was never, despite what lazy journalists have assumed, any sort of falling out, or resentment."

=== 2009–2010: God Is Saying This to You... and Childish Prodigy ===
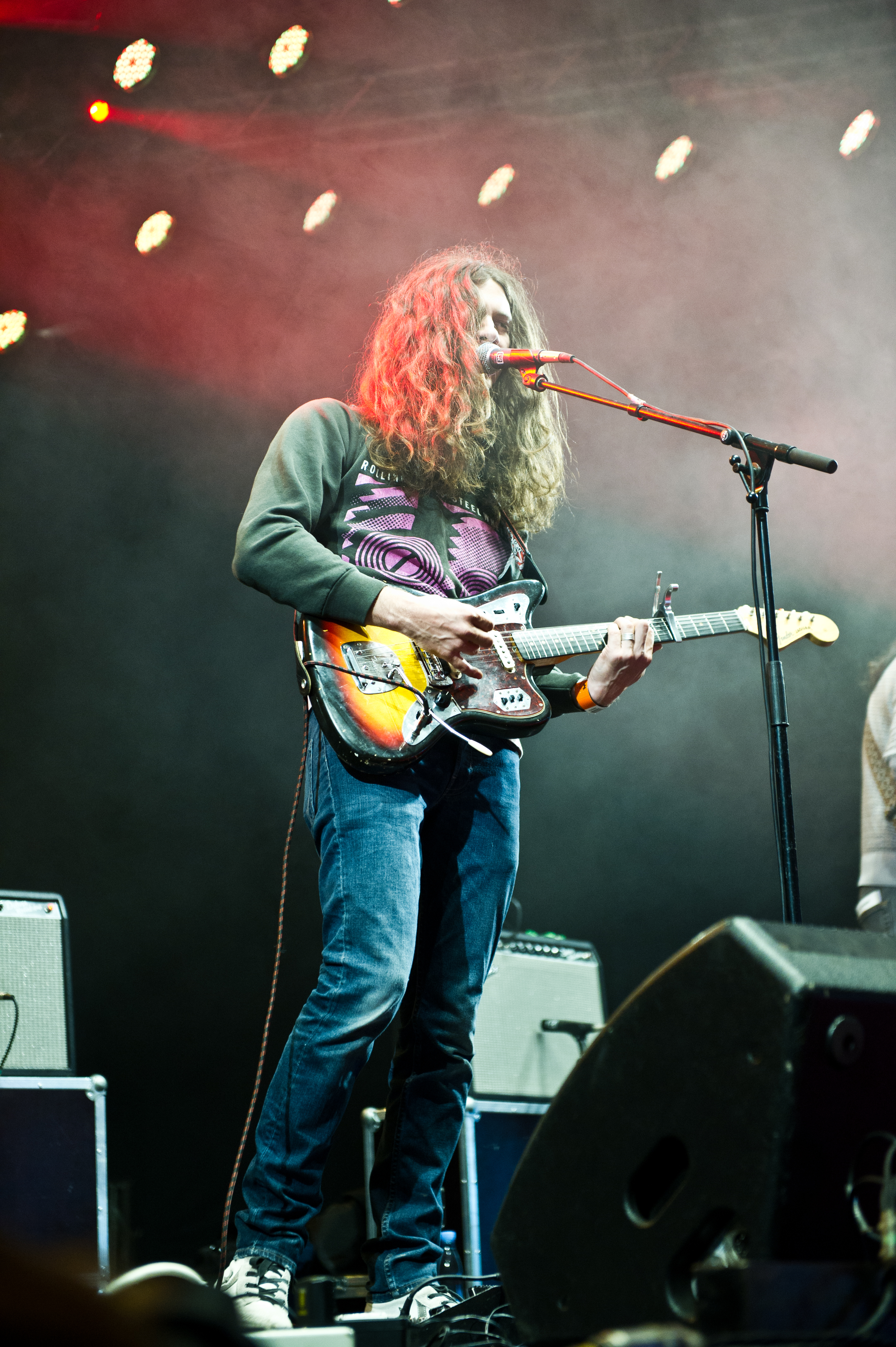
Vile performing at Roskilde Festival, 2011

In April 2009, Mexican Summer released God Is Saying This to You...; a collection of Vile's home recordings dating back to 2003 on vinyl only. Upon its release, Vile had already recorded a studio album, Childish Prodigy, which Vile described as "definitely not as lo-fi" as his previous releases. After shipping the record to various labels, Vile signed with Matador Records in May 2009. Vile noted, "It's a perfect fit. They were my number one choice. I don't really consider my music indie rock or think that Matador cater only to indie rock, but I still feel I can relate most to Matador, more than any other label. Not to mention the fact that they are way on top of their shit."

Recorded with backing band The Violators, Childish Prodigy was released on October 6, 2009, and increased Vile's exposure significantly. Support slots with Dinosaur Jr, Thurston Moore and Fucked Up followed the album's release. Regarding his new position, Vile stated, "Obviously there's more touring, more press and more hype which I won't say is not deserved. There's like a faction of people, too, who like to talk shit, which is kind of new. When I was more independent, there were people who got really excited and there still are but once I got more press people started to comment on blogs. People like to talk shit. [...] It's like climbing a ladder. I like to climb it really slowly. I could probably get really professional right away, but I like to take baby steps and find my own way."

=== 2011–2012: Smoke Ring for My Halo ===
Vile released his fourth studio album, Smoke Ring for My Halo, in 2011. The album peaked at No. 154 on the Billboard Top 200 and placed highly on many end-of-year lists, and in 2013 was named at number 475 in NME's '500 Greatest Albums of All Time'. Later in 2011, Vile released a companion EP, So Outta Reach, and appeared on his former band The War on Drugs' second studio album, Slave Ambient. Shortly after the release of Smoke Ring for My Halo, longtime Violators guitarist Adam Granduciel departed from the band to fully focus on The War on Drugs, with Vile noting, "Adam, he plays in The War on Drugs, his record came out a little after mine did, so at first he toured, and now he's obviously busy with that and now he's working on his new record."

=== 2013–2014: Wakin on a Pretty Daze ===
Wakin on a Pretty Daze was released on April 9, 2013. Regarding the current line-up of his backing band, Vile noted, "I'm playing with Jesse [Trbovich] and Rob [Laakso]. [...] Rob Laakso is the newest member and Jesse has been a member forever. They're steady members. Our drummer is no longer with us, but other than that, different friends played drums on the record and we're doing rehearsals with that right now. But other than that, the Violators are me, Jesse, and Rob and we'll see how it evolves." Priestess drummer Vince Nudo subsequently joined the band on drums and percussion, after performing on two of Wakin on a Pretty Daze's tracks.

Steve Gunn joined the band as an "auxiliary Violator", during the band's May 2013 tour dates, with Vile noting, "It's impossible to just talk about Steve. He's too good! He's so good; just listen to him. What can I even say about him that touches that? I just want to listen to him."

On September 24, 2013, Vile announced the release of a new EP, It's a Big World Out There (And I Am Scared), and a deluxe edition of Wakin on a Pretty Daze.

=== 2015–2017: B'lieve I'm Goin Down... ===
On March 6, 2015, Vile announced that he was working on his sixth studio album, with recording taking place across different locations in the United States. B'lieve I'm Goin Down... was released September 25, 2015, on Matador Records. Vile has described it as "All over the place. Everything you can imagine I've done... That's where I'm at now, that I can sort of tap into every world and make it cohesive." Still in Rock ranked this LP as the 2nd best of 2015.

Vile is featured on the song "Let Me Get There" by the band Hope Sandoval & The Warm Inventions released in 2016.

Vile sings lead vocals on The Sadies song "It's Easy (Like Walking)" on their 2017 album Northern Passages.

=== 2017–2019: Lotta Sea Lice and Bottle It In ===
In 2017, Vile and Courtney Barnett recorded the collaborative album Lotta Sea Lice, released on October 13. The lead single "Over Everything" was released on August 30, 2017, accompanied by the music video directed by Danny Cohen.

In 2018, Vile announced his seventh solo studio album, Bottle It In, released on October 12, 2018.

=== 2020–2023: (watch my moves), Laakso's death and Back to Moon Beach ===
Vile produced and appeared on Sweep It Into Space, the twelfth album by Dinosaur Jr. which was released on April 23, 2021. On April 20, Verve Records announced that they had signed Vile after 11 years with Matador. Vile cited the Velvet Underground as an inspiration for his signing. On April 15, 2022, Verve Records released (watch my moves), Vile's ninth studio album. The album was mostly recorded during COVID-19 lockdowns at Vile's new home studio, OKV Central. Upon the album's release, Adam Langellotti, who had previously helped Vile build his home studio, joined the Violators on bass guitar and keyboards.

On May 4, 2023, Vile's longtime Violators bandmate and recording partner Rob Laakso died from cholangiocarcinoma, a rare and aggressive form of cancer of the bile duct. In a lengthy tribute post, Vile described Laakso as a "Musical genius. Recording whizz. Best husband and father," noting that "Rob and I worked close together on the albums B’lieve and Bottle (him co-producing many of the tracks alongside me, engineering often, playing many different instruments, slaying with ease.) But Wakin' was his first full-time Violator record and you can see the shift to epic proportions from Smoke Ring to it. I’ve clocked in so many hours on the road and in front of amps with him but so have the Violators, Jesse first and Kyle later."

On November 17, 2023, Vile released a 52-minute-long EP, Back to Moon Beach, which was mostly recorded from September 2019 to May 2023. Upon the EP's release, Vile noted: "[My manager] called this an EP by only my standards, haha (cuz the long length) but really if I got around to it again, I wouldn’t say anything, ya know, just put it out and just see what happens. The first six tracks are brand new to the world and blend so sweet together and span from September 2019 to May 2023. If we wanna get technical, let’s call those songs the EP and the last three songs the extended compilation (but they blend so smooth too, right?!) because, well, life in the studio is an extended compilation."

=== 2023–present: Philadelphia's Been Good to Me ===
In June 2025, Vile released a five-track EP, Classic Love, which centred around the song, "Classic Love", by the singer-songwriter Luke Roberts. Regarding the title track, Vile stated: "We always knew [the song] was just extra special. It’s so great. Great enough that I built a whole EP around it." Vile and Roberts became friends after connecting on MySpace many years prior, with Violators drummer Kyle Spence drumming for both acts, and Roberts supporting Vile on his tour for B'lieve I'm Goin Down.... The EP was recorded at Spence’s studio in Athens, Georgia and at a studio operated in Philadelphia by Violators bassist Adam Langellotti.

Vile's tenth studio album, Philadelphia's Been Good to Me, was released on May 29, 2026. Recorded between 2023 and 2026, the album has been described as "a love letter to the city he never left", with Vile stating: "This is my ‘bringing it all back home to Philly’ record. I’m treating it like my last record. I put everything into it."

== Personal life ==
Vile is married to Suzanne Lang, a teacher, and has two daughters. He cites songwriters Randy Newman, Bob Dylan, Neil Young, and Bruce Springsteen as influences in his lyrics and music. During a 2022 episode of Rolling Stone's Music Now podcast, Vile stated that he stopped drinking alcohol sometime "around the tour for Bottle It In" (in late 2018 or early 2019), but noted that he still occasionally consumes cannabis.

== The Violators ==
Current members

- Jesse Trbovich – guitars, bass guitar, saxophone, keyboards (2006–present)
- Kyle Spence – drums, percussion (2013–present)
- Adam Langellotti – bass guitar, keyboards (2022–present)
- Matthew Jugenheimer – keyboards (2024–present)

Former members

- Rob Laakso – guitars, bass guitar, keyboards, various instruments (2011–2021, died 2023)
- Vince Nudo – drums (2013)
- Mike Zanghi – drums, percussion (2007–2012)
- Adam Granduciel – guitars, various instruments (2003–2011)
- "Cousin" Dan Bower – drums, percussion (2003)
- Jay Ganas – bass guitar (2003)
- Michael Johnson – drums (2003–2006)

Former touring musicians

- Robert Robinson – percussion, guitar, effects (2003–2004)
- Steve Gunn – additional live guitars (2013)

== Discography ==
=== Solo ===
==== Studio albums ====
List of studio albums, with selected chart positions and sales
Year	Album	Peak positions										Sales
Year	Album	US	AUS	BEL (FL)	BEL (WA)	DEN	NED	NOR	SWE	SWI	UK	Sales
2008	Constant Hitmaker	—	—	—	—	—	—	—	—	—	—	
2009	God Is Saying This to You...	—	—	—	—	—	—	—	—	—	—	
2009	Childish Prodigy	—	—	—	—	—	—	—	—	—	—	
2011	Smoke Ring for My Halo	154	—	—	—	—	—	—	—	—	—	UK: 14,000
2013	Wakin on a Pretty Daze	47	—	23	81	33	53	21	25	64	41	US: 62,000
2015	B'lieve I'm Goin Down...	40	27	8	44	—	15	18	26	45	25	
2017	Lotta Sea Lice (with Courtney Barnett)	51	5	26	89	—	27	—	—	35	11	
2018	Bottle It In	79	66	10	81	—	26	—	34	50	24	
2022	Watch My Moves	185	100	15	90	—	39	—	—	26	33	
2026	Philadelphia's Been Good to Me	—	—	46	118	—	—	—	—	—	—	
"—" denotes a recording that did not chart or was not released in that territory.

==== EPs ====
- 2003: Ten Songs
- 2003: Rarities & Rejects EP
- 2003: Fingers-Cut, Megamachine! / Kurt Vile split
- 2004: Kurt Vile & Family Vol. 1
- 2004: 9 Home Recordings
- 2005: Trial & Error EP
- 2006: Accidents
- 2007: Kurt Vile / Beat Jams split
- 2008: Overnite KV!!!
- 2009: Fall Demons
- 2009: The Hunchback EP
- 2010: Square Shells
- 2011: So Outta Reach
- 2013: It's a Big World Out There (And I Am Scared)
- 2013: Jamaica Plain (with Sore Eros)
- 2015: Parallelogram (with Steve Gunn)
- 2016: Spotify Sessions
- 2020: Speed, Sound, Lonely KV
- 2023: Back to Moon Beach
- 2025: Classic Love (ep)

==== Singles ====
List of singles, with selected chart positions and certifications, showing year released and album name
Title	Year	Peak positions					Certifications	Album
Title	Year	US AAA	US Alt	US Rock Air.	BEL (FL)	MEX Air.	Certifications	Album
"Freeway"	2008	—	—	—	—	—		Constant Hitmaker
"He's Alright"	2009	—	—	—	—	—		Childish Prodigy
"In My Time"	2010	—	—	—	—	—		Smoke Ring for My Halo
"Never Run Away"	2013	—	—	—	—	—		Wakin on a Pretty Daze
"Pretty Pimpin"	2015	1	33	33	95	44	MC: Gold; RIAA: Gold	B'lieve I'm Goin Down...
"Life Like This"	2015	—	—	—	—	—		B'lieve I'm Goin Down...
"I'm an Outlaw"	2016	—	—	—	—	—		B'lieve I'm Goin Down...
"Over Everything" (with Courtney Barnett)	2017	—	—	—	—	32		Lotta Sea Lice
"Continental Breakfast" (with Courtney Barnett)	2017	—	—	—	97	—		Lotta Sea Lice
"Loading Zones"	2018	4	—	—	78	—		Bottle It In
"Bassackwards"	2018	—	—	—	—	—		Bottle It In
"One Trick Ponies"	2018	—	—	—	69	—		Bottle It In
"How Lucky" (with John Prine)	2020	17	—	—	—	—		Speed, Sound, Lonely EP
"Run Run Run"	2021	—	—	—	—	—		I'll Be Your Mirror: A Tribute to The Velvet Underground & Nico
"Like Exploding Stones"	2022	33	—	—	—	—		Watch My Moves
"Chance to Bleed"	2026	28	—	—	—	—		Philadelphia's Been Good To Me
"—" denotes a recording that did not chart or was not released in that territory.

=== The War on Drugs ===
==== Studio albums ====
- Wagonwheel Blues (2008)
- Slave Ambient (2011)

==== EPs ====
- Barrel of Batteries (2007)

=== Dinosaur Jr. ===
- Sweep It Into Space (2021)
