= Back to Moon Beach =

EP by Kurt Vile
- Released: November 17, 2023
- Recorded: 2019
- Studio: Panoramic House (Marin County, California); OKV Central (Philadelphia, Pennsylvania)
- Length: 52:06
- Label: Verve Forecast
- Producer: Rob Laakso; Adam Langellotti; Cate Le Bon; Rob Schnapf; Kyle Spence; Jesse Trbovich; Kurt Vile

Kurt Vile chronology
Watch My Moves (2022)	Back to Moon Beach (2023)	Philadelphia's Been Good to Me (2026)

Back to Moon Beach is an EP by American indie rock musician Kurt Vile, released on November 17, 2023, through Verve Forecast Records. Although it has the duration of a full-length album, it was marketed as an EP, with Vile's label Verve calling it an "EP by no one's definition but Kurt Vile's".

== Background and recording ==
Most of the recordings were made in 2019 at the Panoramic House studio in Marin County, California, and marked the last contributions from Violators member Rob Laakso, who died from cancer in early 2023. The EP contains covers of "Must Be Santa" and Wilco's 1995 song "Passenger Side", and a re-recording of Vile's 2022 track "Cool Water".

== Critical reception ==
Professional ratings
Review scores
Source	Rating
AllMusic	3.5/5 stars
The Arts Desk	3/5 stars
Exclaim!	7/10
Far Out	3.5/5 stars
Pitchfork	7.5/10
Under the Radar	6/10 stars

Daniel Bromfield of Pitchfork observed that the EP "consists largely of gold-hued guitar jams with simple chord progressions and generous runtimes" and concluded that it is "hard to tell if Moon Beach is meant as a continuation of Vile's past work or the start of something new, but that uncertainty is also what makes it feel so exciting". Elle Palmer of Far Out wrote that while the EP "sounds warm and familiar, particularly to pre-existing fans, Vile does keep that one toe firmly pointed towards the future" and he has "earned the right of self-indulgence" for its length "under the guise of an EP". Exclaim!' Myles Tiessen remarked that "these diamonds glow brighter than you could have ever imagined", although found it to be "tremendously long, offering remixes of old material and recapitulating many typical Vile motifs".

AllMusic's Fred Thomas stated that the tracks on the first third "all stroll by at similar relaxed tempos with the kind of minimal effort in regard to structural complexity and vocal performance that Vile has made his calling card", and felt that its highlights achieve "the same levels of quality as his fully considered albums". Ellie Roberts of The Arts Desk wrote, "familiar but intimate, Vile's drawled vocals are illuminated by the stories that his lyrics tell, and the subdued tempo of the EP is punctuated with moments of alt-rock bliss", summarizing that it is an "enjoyable listen" with a "calm energy".

== Track listing ==
All tracks are written by Kurt Vile, except where noted.

Back to Moon Beach track listing
No.	Title	Length
1.	"Another Good Year for the Roses"	5:34
2.	"Touched Somethin (Caught a Virus)"	6:31
3.	"Back to Moon Beach"	8:15
4.	"Like a Wounded Bird Trying to Fly"	5:29
5.	"Blues Come for Some"	5:09
6.	"Tom Petty's Gone (But Tell Him I Asked for Him)"	8:15
7.	"Must Be Santa" (Bill Fredericks, Hal Moore)	5:12
8.	"Passenger Side" (Jeff Tweedy)	3:10
9.	"Cool Water" (single mix)	4:31
Total length:		52:06

Deluxe 2LP bonus track
No.	Title	Length
10.	"Constant Repeat" (Charlotte Aitchison, Noonie Bao, Linus Wiklund)

Notes

- Track titles are stylized in sentence case, parenthesized text is stylized in all lowercase.

== Personnel ==
Musicians

- Kurt Vile – vocals (all tracks), piano (1, 2, 5, 7, 9), electric guitar (1, 3, 4, 6, 7); baritone guitar, bells (1); acoustic guitar (2, 4, 6, 8, 9), keyboards (3), bass (4, 5), synthesizer programming (6), trumpet (7)
- Rob Laakso – bass (tracks 1, 3, 6, 9), electric guitar (1, 2, 9), synthesizer programming (1), lap steel guitar (2)
- Adam Langellotti – drums (tracks 1, 8), synthesizer programming (4, 6), bass (4, 8), electric guitar (6); percussion, Rhodes (8)
- Stella Mozgawa – drums (tracks 1–4, 6), percussion (1)
- Chris Cohen – electric guitar (tracks 1, 6); bass, organ (2)
- Dave Scher – lap steel guitar (tracks 1, 3); keyboards, lap steel guitar, melodica (3)
- Mikel Patrick Avery – percussion (tracks 1, 3, 6), whistle (6)
- Gia Margaret – vocals (track 1)
- Cate Le Bon – piano (tracks 3, 6)
- Awilda Vile – background vocals (track 7)
- Delphine Vile – background vocals (track 7)
- Kyle Spence – drums (track 9)
- Jesse Trbovich – electric guitar (track 9)

Technical

- Kurt Vile – production (all tracks), mixing (tracks 1, 3, 4, 6)
- Adam Langellotti – production, mixing (tracks 1, 3, 4, 6, 8); engineering (tracks 1, 3–6, 8)
- Cate Le Bon – production, engineering (tracks 1, 3, 6)
- Rob Schnapf – production (tracks 5, 9), mixing (2, 5, 9)
- Jesse Trbovich – production (track 9)
- Kyle Spence – production (track 9)
- Rob Laakso – production (track 9)
- Jessica Thompson – mastering
- Ted Young – mixing, engineering (track 7)
- Matt Schuessler – engineering (tracks 1–4, 6, 9)
- Gabe Wax – engineering (tracks 1–3, 6)
- Aidan Finn – engineering assistance (tracks 1, 3, 4, 6)
- Gabriel Giammarco – engineering assistance (tracks 1, 3, 4, 6)

== Charts ==
Chart performance for Back to Moon Beach
Chart (2023)	Peak position
UK Album Downloads (OCC)	77
