= Childish Prodigy =

Studio album by Kurt Vile
- Released: October 6, 2009
- Recorded: 2009
- Genres: Indie rock, lo-fi
- Length: 49:34
- Label: Matador Records
- Producers: Jeff Zeigler, Kurt Vile, Adam Granduciel

Kurt Vile chronology
The Hunchback EP (2009)	Childish Prodigy (2009)	Square Shells (2010)

Singles from Shields
- 1. "He's Alright" Released: October 6, 2009

Professional ratings
Aggregate scores
Source	Rating
Metacritic	71/100
Review scores
Source	Rating
Allmusic	4/5 stars
The A.V. Club	B+
Drowned in Sound	(7/10)
NME	(8/10)
The Phoenix	3/4 stars
Pitchfork (website)''Pitchfork''	6.3/10
Q Magazine	3/5 stars
Tiny Mix Tapes	4/5 stars
Uncut	4/5 stars
Under the Radar	(7/10)

Childish Prodigy is the third studio album by American indie rock musician Kurt Vile, released on October 6, 2009, on Matador Records. Upon the album's release, Vile stated, "I tell people it's my masterpiece. It's pretty epic. I put a lot of money into it. It cost in the thousands."

Produced by Vile, Jeff Zeigler and bandmate Adam Granduciel, Childish Prodigy was Vile's first album to be released on Matador Records, and was preceded by the EP, The Hunchback (2009), and the single, "He's Alright".

== Background and recording ==
Kurt Vile's previous two albums, Constant Hitmaker (2008) and God Is Saying This to You... (2009), were primarily composed of lo-fi home recordings, recorded over five years from 2003 to 2008. Childish Prodigy, however, marked Vile's first attempt at crafting a cohesive, studio-based album. Vile noted, "It was more involved than anything I had done and it was the first time I worked on something as a whole actual album, as a single piece. The other ones were compiled."

Vile recorded the album with producer Jeff Zeigler, prior to signing to Matador Records, and noted, "The time I went into the studio with Jeff [Zeigler], I knew he was into more far-out stuff and kind of crazy gear. It was also more laid back. I didn't have a label knocking on the door to get it done or anything like that, and so we got to know each other and our styles."

Despite being predominately a studio-based album, Childish Prodigy features two home recordings, "Blackberry Song" and "Overnite Religion" recorded with bandmate and frequent collaborator Adam Granduciel.

== Writing and composition ==
Regarding the album's overall aesthetic, and the increased involvement of backing band The Violators, Vile noted, "It's way more of a full-band-style arrangement, and I think at times it gets a little darker. I think it's gonna be more of a fall kind of feel, with some pretty psychedelic rock numbers that are pretty catchy, then just some good rock songs. [...] There's definitely a lot more electricity, a lot more rock. [...] It's pretty raw, though, and there's two home recordings on it. I actually said in one interview that it's my Loveless, but I only said that in comparison to my more stripped-down home recordings. It's all relatively simple, even if there are a lot more tracks on each song."

== Track listing ==
All tracks written by Kurt Vile and arranged by the Violators except where noted.

No.	Title	Length
1.	"Hunchback"	4:50
2.	"Dead Alive"	3:47
3.	"Overnite Religion"	5:15
4.	"Freak Train"	7:18
5.	"Blackberry Song"	3:26
6.	"Monkey" (Dim Stars)	3:44
7.	"Heart Attack"	3:09
8.	"Amplifier"	4:01
9.	"Inside Looking Out"	6:39
10.	"He's Alright" (hidden track)	4:35
11.	"Goodbye Freaks" (hidden track)	2:55

== Personnel ==
=== Kurt Vile & the Violators ===
- Kurt Vile – vocals, guitars, resonator guitar (1 and 6), 12-string guitar (3 and 7), space guitar (3), piano (1, 5, 6, 7 and 8), drum machine (4), Korgs (4), banjo (7), electronics (8), trumpet (8), sampler (9), synth (9), harmonica (9)
- Adam Granduciel – electric guitars (9), baritone guitar (1 and 6), fuzz guitar (4), ambient 12-string guitar (8), tremolo guitar (9), string synth (3), sampler (5), electronics (8), drums (8), percussion (8), lap percussion (5)
- Jesse Trbovich – fuzz guitar (1 and 6), baritone guitar (9), saxophone (4), vibrato guitars (10)
- Mike Zanghi – drums and percussion (1 and 6)

Honorary Alumni:

- "Cousin" Dan Bower – drums (4), snare drum (3), percussion (3)
- Michael Johnson – Korg MS-10 (4), caveman drums (9)

=== Additional musicians ===
- Jeff Zeigler – Korg Mono/Poly (4)
- Mikele Edwards – backing vocals (8)

=== Recording personnel ===
- Jeff Zeigler – producer (1, 2, 4, 6, 7, 8 and 9), recording, mixing
- Kurt Vile – producer, recording (3 and 5)
- Adam Granduciel – producer (1, 3, 4, 5, 6, 8 and 9), recording (3 and 5)
- Jesse Trbovich – producer (1, 4, 6 and 9)
- Mike Zanghi – producer (1 and 6)
- Michael Johnson – producer (9)
- Tom Cason – additional recording and mixing (3 and 5)
- Alan Douches – mastering

=== Artwork ===
- Boyd Shropshire – art design, art direction
- Greg Kletsel – art design, art direction
- Kurt Vile – art direction
- Kellie Jo Tinney – live Violator pictures
- Robert Robinson – forest and organ photograph
- Tiffany Yoon – Mike Zanghi photograph
