= Pretty Pimpin =

Single by Kurt Vile

from the album B'lieve I'm Goin Down...
- Released: July 21, 2015
- Length: 4:58
- Label: Matador
- Songwriter(s): Kurt Vile
- Producer(s): Kurt Vile; Rob Schnapf

Kurt Vile singles chronology
| "He's Alright" (2009) | "Pretty Pimpin" (2015) | "I'm an Outlaw" (2016) |

Music video
- "Pretty Pimpin" on YouTube

"Pretty Pimpin" is a song written and performed by American indie rock musician Kurt Vile. The song was released as a single on July 21, 2015, and received a positive reception from music critics.

"Pretty Pimpin" peaked at number 1 on the Billboard Adult Alternative Songs chart, becoming Vile's first chart-topper on a Billboard chart.

== Critical reception ==
"Pretty Pimpin" received favorable reviews from critics. Evan Minsker of Pitchfork awarded it Best New Track, and said that its overall aesthetic is entirely welcome. Kyle McGovern of Spin said that the song is the most engaging and jaunty-sounding single Vile has pushed to radio. Tom Hughes of The Guardian called it one of Vile's "loveliest songs yet, and a great summation of his ingenious-weirdo appeal". The song has also been highlighted as a standout track of its parent album by AllMusic and Consequence of Sound.

== Music video ==
The music video was released on July 21, 2015.

== Weekly charts ==
| Chart (2015–16) | Peak position |
|---|---|
| US Adult Alternative Songs (Billboard) | 1 |
| US Alternative Airplay (Billboard) | 33 |
| US Rock & Alternative Airplay (Billboard) | 33 |

== Certifications and sales ==
| Region | Certification | Certified units/sales |
|---|---|---|
| Canada (Music Canada) | Gold | 40,000^{‡} |
| New Zealand (RMNZ) | Gold | 15,000^{‡} |
| United States (RIAA) | Gold | 500,000^{‡} |
^{‡} Sales+streaming figures based on certification alone.

== See also ==
- List of Billboard number-one adult alternative singles of the 2010s
