= Bottle It In =

Studio album by Kurt Vile
- Released: October 12, 2018
- Studios: Tarquin (Bridgeport, Connecticut); Beer Hole (Los Angeles)
- Genre: Indie rock
- Length: 78:38
- Label: Matador
- Producers: Kurt Vile; Rob Schnapf; Shawn Everett; Peter Katis; Rob Laakso

Kurt Vile chronology
Lotta Sea Lice (2017)	Bottle It In (2018)	Watch My Moves (2022)

Singles from Bottle It In
- 1. "Loading Zones" Released: August 16, 2018; 2. "Bassackwards" Released: September 10, 2018

Bottle It In is the eighth studio album by American musician Kurt Vile, released on October 12, 2018, through Matador Records. It features contributions from Kim Gordon, Cass McCombs, Stella Mozgawa of Warpaint, and Mary Lattimore.

The album was preceded by the singles "Loading Zones" and "Bassackwards".

== Songs ==
"Hysteria" was written en route to a recording session. Both "Hysteria" and "Cold Was the Wind" reference Vile's fear of flying.

Vile started writing "Mutinies" as a teenager, expanding it and rewriting sections numerous times over the ensuing decades.

== Recording ==
The album was recorded with various producers in numerous studios and cities across the United States in between Vile's touring schedule. Vile recounted: "I'd go into the studio straight from tour for a day or so, sometimes by myself, sometimes with a band. Go on trips in between or combine different things, like tour into the studio, into meeting my family, into travelling across the country and back into the studio. Combining all things, not compartmentalising as much, keeping it all like everyday life."

== Critical reception ==
Professional ratings
Aggregate scores
Source	Rating
AnyDecentMusic?	7.4/10
Metacritic	78/100
Review scores
Source	Rating
AllMusic	3.5/5 stars
Consequence of Sound	B
The Guardian	4/5 stars
The Independent	4/5 stars
Mojo	4/5 stars
The Observer	4/5 stars
Pitchfork	7.0/10
Q	4/5 stars
Rolling Stone	4/5 stars
The Times	4/5 stars

According to review aggregator Metacritic, Bottle It In has received an average score of 78 out of 100 based on reviews from 24 critics, indicating "generally favorable reviews". Sam Sodomsky of Pitchfork deemed the highlight of the album to be second single "Bassackwards", which he called "10 minutes of warped, psychedelic folk-rock, like a long sigh in the face of existential dread". Sodomsky noted that the album has a loose structure with "more accessible tracks up front and a meditative, somewhat indulgent back-half", and summarized that the album feels like Vile is lost in an "in-between moment".

== Track listing ==
Bottle It In track listing
No.	Title	Length
1.	"Loading Zones"	3:23
2.	"Hysteria"	5:22
3.	"Yeah Bones"	4:44
4.	"Bassackwards"	9:46
5.	"One Trick Ponies"	5:20
6.	"Rollin with the Flow"	3:00
7.	"Check Baby"	7:53
8.	"Bottle It In"	10:40
9.	"Mutinies"	5:52
10.	"Come Again"	5:44
11.	"Cold Was the Wind"	4:50
12.	"Skinny Mini"	10:26
13.	"(Bottle Back)"	1:38
Total length:		78:38

All songs written by Kurt Vile; the exception is "Rollin' with the Flow", which was written by Jerry Hayes.

Notes

- "(Bottle Back)" is stylized in lowercase.

== Personnel ==
- Kurt Vile – lead and backing vocals, electric and acoustic guitars (except on tracks 8, 10, and 13), keyboards (except on tracks 1 and 4), harmonica (tracks 1 and 5), tambourine (tracks 2, 9, and 12), banjo (track 10)

The Violators

- Rob Laakso – bass, synthesizer (track 1), backing vocal (track 1), drum machine (tracks 2 and 9), drums (track 2), electric and acoustic guitars (tracks 2, 3, 6, 8, and 13), strings (track 6), sequencer (track 7), percussion (track 12)
- Kyle Spence – drums (tracks 1, 3, and 6), percussion (track 3)
- Jesse Trbovich – electric guitar (tracks 1, 3, 6, 8, and 10)

Additional musicians

- Joe Kennedy – keyboards (tracks 3, 4, 6, and 7), electric guitar (track 9), backing vocal (track 1)
- Mary Lattimore – harp (tracks 4, 6, and 8)
- Bobby Gruska – drums (tracks 4 and 9), percussion (track 9)
- Stella Mozgawa – drums (tracks 5, 8, and 11), percussion (track 5), backing vocal (track 5), bass (track 8), synthesizer (track 8)
- Vince Nudo – drums (track 7), percussion (track 7)
- Kyle Crane – drums (track 10)
- Farmer Dave Scher – backing vocal (track 5), keyboards (track 9), lap steel guitar (track 10)
- Kim Gordon – acoustic guitar feedback (track 9)
- Eric D. Johnson – backing vocal (track 1)
- Margaret Yen – backing vocal (track 1)
- Farrah Katina – backing vocal (track 1)
- Robert Robinson – backing vocals (tracks 1 and 3)
- Deb Warfield – backing vocal (track 6)
- Cass McCombs – backing vocal (track 8)
- Jess Wolfe – backing vocal (track 10)
- Holly Laessig – backing vocal (track 10)
- Hetty Marriot-Brittan – backing vocal (track 11)

Production

- Tracks 1, 3, and 6 produced by Kurt Vile, the Violators, and Peter Katis; mixed by Peter Katis
- Tracks 2, 7, and 10 produced by Kurt Vile, Rob Laasko, and Peter Katis; mixed by Peter Katis
- Track 4 produced by Kurt Vile and Shawn Everett; mixed by Shawn Everett
- Tracks 5, 8, and 11 produced and mixed by Rob Schnapf
- Tracks 9 and 12 produced by Kurt Vile, Rob Laasko, and Shawn Everett; mixed by Shawn Everett
- Track 13 produced by Kurt Vile; mixed by Rob Schnapf

== Charts ==
=== Weekly charts ===
Weekly chart performance of Bottle It In
Chart (2018)	Peak position
Australian Albums (ARIA)	66
Belgian Albums (Ultratop Flanders)	10
Belgian Albums (Ultratop Wallonia)	81
Dutch Albums (Album Top 100)	26
German Albums (Offizielle Top 100)	90
Irish Albums (IRMA)	54
Portuguese Albums (AFP)	20
Scottish Albums (Official Charts)	18
Spanish Albums (Promusicae)	60
Swedish Albums (Sverigetopplistan)	34
Swiss Albums (Schweizer Hitparade)	50
UK Albums (Official Charts)	24
US Billboard 200	79
US Top Rock Albums (Billboard)	11

=== Year-end charts ===
Year-end chart performance of Bottle It In
Chart (2018)	Position
Belgian Albums (Ultratop Flanders)	181
