= So Outta Reach =

EP by Kurt Vile
- Released: November 8, 2011
- Studio: Magic Shop, Headgear, Water Music, Miner Street
- Genre: Lo-fi, Indie rock
- Label: Matador
- Producer: John Agnello & Kurt Vile and the Violators

Kurt Vile chronology
Smoke Ring for My Halo (2011)	So Outta Reach (2011)	Wakin on a Pretty Daze (2013)

Professional ratings
Aggregate scores
Source	Rating
Metacritic	76/100
Review scores
Source	Rating
Pitchfork	(7.9)

So Outta Reach is an EP by American indie rock musician Kurt Vile, released on November 8, 2011 on Matador Records. Produced by both John Agnello and Kurt Vile & the Violators, the EP's tracks were initially recorded during sessions for Smoke Ring for My Halo (2011) and reworked in the summer of 2011.

Upon release, So Outta Reach peaked at 28 on the US Billboard Heatseekers Album Chart.

The EP was subsequently included on the deluxe version of Smoke Ring for My Halo.

== Background ==
Regarding the songs included on So Outta Reach, Kurt Vile stated: "There are a lot of songs on there that I wanted to fit on [Smoke Ring for My Halo], like "The Creature." I really wanted to get that one on the record."

== Artwork ==
The EP's cover art features a collage of photographs featuring Vile asleep at a party. Regarding the cover, Vile noted, "I went to a party with my wife, and her friend Greg Chow—he's the Asian guy giving the devil horns—took the pictures. I drank too much tequila early on in the party, and he took all these photos and posted them online. Truthfully, I was embarrassed by them at first because I'm self-conscious, but my manager found them and was like, 'That's your cover.' I just laughed. And then he sent it to Matador, and they loved it."

== Track listing ==
All tracks written by Kurt Vile except where noted.

1. "The Creature"
2. "It's Alright"
3. "Life's a Beach"
4. "Laughing Stock"
5. "Downbound Train" (Bruce Springsteen)
6. "(so outta reach)"

== Personnel ==
=== Kurt Vile & the Violators ===
- Kurt Vile – vocals, guitar, banjo, synth, optigan
- Adam Granduciel – guitar, sweet tones
- Jesse Trbovich – guitar, saxophone, synth
- Mike Zanghi – drums, percussion

=== Additional musicians ===
- Steve Shelley – drums (3)
- Mike Polizze – bass (3)
- Rob Laakso – bass (5)

=== Recording ===
- John Agnello – producer
- Kurt Vile & the Violators – producers
- Greg Calbi – mastering

=== Artwork ===
- Greg Chow – front cover photos and concept
- Shawn Brackbill – back cover photo
- Matt De Jong – design
