= Watch My Moves =

Studio album by Kurt Vile
- Released: April 15, 2022
- Genres: Rock; folk rock; Americana; indie rock
- Length: 73:44
- Label: Verve Forecast
- Producers: Kurt Vile; Rob Schnapf

Kurt Vile chronology
Bottle It In (2018)	Watch My Moves (2022)	Back to Moon Beach (2023)

Singles from Watch My Moves
- 1. "Like Exploding Stones" Released: February 16, 2022

Watch My Moves, stylized as (watch my moves), is the ninth studio album by American indie rock musician Kurt Vile, released on April 15, 2022, on Verve Forecast Records. Co-produced by Vile and Rob Schnapf, the album's initial recording sessions began in 2019, during the tour in support of Vile's previous album, Bottle It In (2018). The impact of the COVID-19 pandemic, however, resulted in Vile building a home recording studio, OKV Central, at which he, Schnapf and his backing band the Violators worked on the majority of the album's songs across lockdowns in 2020 and 2021.

Preceded by the singles "Like Exploding Stones", "Hey Like a Child" and "Mount Airy Hill (Way Gone)" the album was released to generally favorable reviews.

== Background and recording ==
Work on Watch My Moves began in 2019, with Vile feeling inspired by the full-band performances of his backing band the Violators during the tour in support of his eighth studio album, Bottle It In: "I was really into touring as a band and playing live and then because we're all together, somehow get into the studio wherever we are, in a Neil Young kind of way. You just go in there and play live." In the autumn of 2019, Vile recorded new material for the album with singer-songwriter and producer Cate Le Bon, with one of the tracks from these sessions, "Jesus on a Wire", ultimately appearing on the album.

In early 2020, prior to the onset of the COVID-19 pandemic, Vile was in the midst of recording and co-producing Dinosaur Jr's twelfth studio album, Sweep It Into Space, and had performed and recorded with John Prine for his Speed, Sound, Lonely KV EP. Vile and the Violators completed a six-day recording session with Rob Schnapf in California, with Vile planning to work on a studio album with The Sadies and embark on a solo European tour in the summer. Reflecting on this time, Vile remarked: "I remember I was so exhausted".

The COVID-19 lockdowns resulted in Vile putting his 2020 plans on hold. Throughout the year, he built a basement studio at his home in Mount Airy, Philadelphia, called OKV Central, and took his time writing and recording new material across 2020 and 2021: "If I didn't have some solid songs in my pocket I guess I would have been more stressed out during lockdown, but because I knew I had some solid things to fall back on I knew I could take my time and make this record." Over the next year-and-a-half, Vile balanced home life with his family alongside recording Watch My Moves with co-producer Schnapf and the Violators: "I thought about this record every single day obsessively since I've been making it. I would just wake up thinking about just wanting it to be amazing."

The album was recorded at Vile's home studio OKV Central, in Mount Airy, Philadelphia, with Vile playing alongside his backing band The Violators, as well as Rob Schnapf and James Stewart. It was self-produced by Vile in collaboration with Schnapf. Additional contributors to the album include Cate Le Bon, Chastity Belt, Stella Mozgawa, and Sarah Jones. The album also includes a cover of Bruce Springsteen's song "Wages of Sin".

== Critical reception ==
Professional ratings
Aggregate scores
Source	Rating
Metacritic	79/100
Review scores
Source	Rating
AllMusic	4/5 stars
DIY	3.5/5 stars
Exclaim!	8/10
NME	4/5 stars
Pitchfork	7.4/10
PopMatters	6/10
Rolling Stone	3.5/5 stars
Slant Magazine	2.5/5 stars

Watch My Moves received generally favorable reviews from critics; review aggregator Metacritic gave the album a weighted average score of 79/100, based on 15 critic reviews. The album was noted for its generally relaxed feeling. Writing for Rolling Stone, Simon Vozick-Levinson described the album as a "majestically mellow zone-out session", giving the album 3.5 starts out of 5. For Pitchfork, Sam Sodomsky wrote that the album "conjures images of dreaming and traveling without worrying where they lead" and that "Vile's singing leans toward the deadpan spoken word of late-career Lou Reed", rating the album 7.4 out of 10. Concluding the review for AllMusic, Fred Thomas claimed that "The sounds will be familiar (even comforting) to longtime fans, but there are so many unpredictable turns and head-scratching moments that Vile ends up taking his music somewhere new by approaching the same kind of songwriting he's been doing since he started from unlikely angles."

Writing for NME, Rhys Buchanan said of the album that "Vile isn't about to abandon the formula that's served him so well... It packs that wholesome, easy charm he's always held", giving the album 4 out of 5 stars. In a less positive review, Thomas Bedenbaugh of Slant Magazine gave the album 2.5 stars out of 5, arguing that while the album was a "competently written set of Americana-inflected folk rock", it was nevertheless "disappointing to see the artist play it so safe."

== Track listing ==
All tracks are written by Kurt Vile except "Wages of Sin", written by Bruce Springsteen.

Watch My Moves track listing
No.	Title	Producer(s)	Length
1.	"Goin on a Plane Today"	Vile; Rob Schnapf	2:29
2.	"Flyin (Like a Fast Train)"	Vile; Schnapf	4:46
3.	"Palace of OKV in Reverse"	Vile; Schnapf	2:53
4.	"Like Exploding Stones"	Vile; Schnapf; Jesse Trbovich; Kyle Spence; Rob Laakso	7:18
5.	"Mount Airy Hill (Way Gone)"	Vile; Schnapf; Trbovich; Spence; Laakso	5:32
6.	"Hey Like a Child"	Vile; Schnapf	5:46
7.	"Jesus on a Wire"	Vile; Cate Le Bon	5:15
8.	"Fo Sho"	Vile; Schnapf	4:52
9.	"Cool Water"	Vile; Schnapf; Trbovich; Spence; Laakso	5:05
10.	"Chazzy Don't Mind"	Vile; Schnapf	5:33
11.	"(Shiny Things)"	Vile	0:58
12.	"Say the Word"	Vile; Schnapf; Trbovich; Spence; Laakso	5:48
13.	"Wages of Sin"	Vile; Schnapf; Trbovich; Spence; Laakso	7:34
14.	"Kurt Runner"	Vile	3:16
15.	"Stuffed Leopard"	Vile; Schnapf	6:39
Total length:			73:44

== Personnel ==
Musicians

- Kurt Vile – vocals (1–10, 12, 13, 15), piano (tracks 1, 9, 10, 13), trumpet (1), acoustic guitar (2, 4, 9, 10, 12, 15), drum machine (2), electric guitar (2–4, 6, 9, 12, 13, 15), synth bass (3, 4, 11, 14), keyboards (5, 13), slide guitar (5), synthesizer programming (8, 12, 13)
- Rob Laakso – bass (2–5, 7–9, 12, 13), electric guitar (9), background vocals (12), acoustic guitar (13)
- Jesse Trbovich – bass (4, 6), keyboards (4), electric guitar (5, 9, 13), acoustic guitar (12, 13), harmonica (15)
- Kyle Spence – drums (3–5, 9, 12, 13), percussion (4)
- Matt Schuessler – bass (1), upright bass (15)
- James Stewart – tenor saxophone (1, 4)
- Sarah Jones – drums (2, 6, 8, 10, 15), percussion (2)
- Stella Mozgawa – drums, percussion (7)
- Chris Cohen – electric guitar (7), background vocals (15)
- Cate Le Bon – vocals, piano (7)
- Craig McQuiston – bass (10)
- Julia Shapiro – vocals, electric guitar (10)
- Lydia Lund – vocals, electric guitar (10)
- Annie Truscott – vocals, violin (10)
- Farmer Dave Scher – keyboards (12), lap steel guitar (15)
- Adam Langellotti – synthesizer programming (15)

Technical

- Greg Calbi – mastering
- Steve Fallone – mastering
- Rob Schnapf – mixing (1–10, 12, 13, 15)
- Ted Young – mixing (11, 14), engineering (1–5, 11, 12, 14)
- Matt Schuessler – engineering (1–10, 12, 13, 15)
- Adam Langellotti – engineering (1–5, 11, 12, 14)
- Gabe Wax – engineering (7)
- Kurt Vile – engineering (2, 3, 14)

Artwork

- Kurt Vile – art direction
- Geoff Gans – art direction, design, back cover
- Joey Lipstein – cover photo
- Robert Robinson – back cover

== Charts ==
Chart performance for Watch My Moves
Chart (2022)	Peak position
Australian Albums (ARIA)	100
Belgian Albums (Ultratop Flanders)	15
Belgian Albums (Ultratop Wallonia)	90
Dutch Albums (Album Top 100)	39
French Albums (SNEP)	144
German Albums (Offizielle Top 100)	38
Scottish Albums (Official Charts)	4
Swiss Albums (Schweizer Hitparade)	26
UK Albums (Official Charts)	33
US Billboard 200	185
US Top Alternative Albums (Billboard)	22
US Top Rock Albums (Billboard)	34
