= Constant Hitmaker =

Studio album by Kurt Vile
- Released: 2008
- Recorded: 2003–2007
- Genre: Indie rock, lo-fi
- Length: 41:16
- Label: Woodsist Records, Gulcher Records
- Producer: Kurt Vile, Adam Granduciel, Brian McTear

Kurt Vile chronology
Constant Hitmaker (2008)	God Is Saying This to You... (2009)

Professional ratings
Review scores
Source	Rating
Pitchfork	(7.2)

Constant Hitmaker is the debut studio album by American indie rock musician Kurt Vile, released in 2008 on Gulcher Records and Woodsist. Self-produced, and recorded between 2003 and 2007, the album is primarily composed of lo-fi home recordings that Vile had previously issued on CD-R.

Following the album's release, Vile stated that Constant Hitmaker is "like a best-of, sort of, but leaning toward the psychedelic pop stuff, kind of my later material."

== Background and recording ==
The majority of the album's tracks are home recordings, however, the album's opening track, "Freeway", was recorded at Miner Street studios with producer Brian McTear. Vile noted, "We were doing "Freeway" live — me and my buddy Adam at the time — and the live show was going good, and on that version we'd play along to the drum machine and blast guitars. [...] I'd done home recordings a lot and I was like, ‘I need to go in the studio.’" The song was recorded on July 6, 2006 by Vile, Granduciel and drummer "Cousin" Dan Bower, with Vile noting, "I remember I worked as much as possible to save up for the studio session."

According to Vile, '"Don’t Get Cute" I recorded when my wife was away. I was hanging with my friends and we stayed up all night to get it done, and then drove to see a show in New York the next night with no sleep. And "Slow Talkers" — I was definitely kind of out of my mind." The track, "Classic Rock in Spring", is influenced by the changing of the seasons, with Vile noting, "I wrote that song “Classic Rock In Spring” when spring started and I started feeling good again after winter. I feel like songs are written at particular times, and it definitely comes across as that certain way. In the winter, you can write some darker songs, but it does depend on what's going on at the time."

Regarding the album's lo-fi aesthetic, Vile noted, "[the album] has songs that maybe if you don't normally listen to that stuff, you'd think were a bit throwaway because of the recording quality." In March 2022, Vile reflected on the recording process of Constant Hitmaker: "I was working a day job, and I wasn't sure what was going to happen, and there's an urgency there that I kind of think is beautiful and is hard to touch again. But I feel like I have it again [on (watch my moves)] now I'm living a normal life."

== Release and reception ==
Regarding the album's initial release on Gulcher Records, Vile stated, "I’m glad he did it — he really got the record out there. I didn’t know what labels to send stuff to. I’d meet bands I liked and give it to them. Like Ariel Pink, and bands would like it but I could never get someone to put it out. So my friend Richie who drums in Clockcleaner hooked me up. [...] I was paranoid about the recordings because I’d had them so long. I’d fixate on one detail. Like maybe a bad note -‘Oh, that’s too messy.’ But it's gotten way more buzz than I could ever expect. It's all a learning process. I always knew this was what I wanted to do. I'm happy it's finally happening."

== Artwork ==
The album's front cover is inspired by the artwork to Bob Dylan's studio album, Street-Legal (1978), with Vile noting, "Street-Legal is like a cult classic. It's pretty cheesy at times but you learn to embrace it. The words just keep coming and coming and you're like "How the fuck did Dylan think up all these insane lyrics, and why are the back-up singers repeating every single line?" Then, before you know it, you're hooked 'cause there's always another whacked line you missed. Awesome album cover, better than Hassle. That's actually where I got the concept for the Constant Hitmaker photo."

In 2013, regarding his home-city Philadelphia's influence on the album's artwork, Vile noted, "If you look at the cover of my first album, Constant Hitmaker, that's what I think about when I think of Philly. Walking home from my job through the buildings – seeing urban decay and a wide open sky – because the neighbourhood where I live is not in the centre of the city."

== Track listing ==
No.	Title	Length
1.	"Freeway"	2:41
2.	"Breathin Out"	2:57
3.	"Space Forklift"	5:35
4.	"Slow Talkers"	3:00
5.	"Trumpets in Summer"	2:25
6.	"Don't Get Cute"	3:02
7.	"Intro in Z"	0:29
8.	"Take my Advice"	3:15
9.	"Deep Sea"	5:12
10.	"Black Hands"	1:43
11.	"American Folded"	1:28
12.	"Best Love"	3:22
13.	"Classic Rock in Spring/Freeway in Mind"	6:07

== Personnel ==
=== Musicians ===
- Kurt Vile – vocals, guitar, various instruments
- Adam Granduciel – electric guitar (1), organ (1), piano (9), bonus noise (5)
- Cousin Dan – drums (1)
- Sore Eros – ambient guitar (5)

=== Recording personnel ===
- Kurt Vile – producer, recording
- Adam Granduciel – co-producer (1, 5, 6 and 9)
- Brian McTear – producer (1)
- Bob Park – additional mixing (3 and 6)

=== Artwork ===
- Sarah McKay – photograph
