= Remember My Name (Sam Fender song) =

2025 single by Sam Fender

Single by Sam Fender

from the album People Watching
- Released: 14 February 2025
- Length: 3:02
- Label: Polydor
- Songwriter: Sam Fender
- Producers: Sam Fender; Markus Dravs

Sam Fender singles chronology
"Arm's Length" (2025)	"Remember My Name" (2025)	"Little Bit Closer" (2025)

Music video
- "Remember My Name" on YouTube

"Remember My Name" is a song by English singer-songwriter Sam Fender, featuring the Easington Colliery Band, a traditional British brass band. It was released on 14 February 2025 as the fourth single from his third studio album, People Watching, and the last single to be released before the album itself.

== Background and release ==
The song was first heard publicly on 9 April 2023 in an impromptu live performance at Newcastle's Prohibition Cabaret Bar, with Fender accompanying himself on the piano. A video of the performance, filmed by venue staff member Daniel Gaffey, was extensively shared on social media.

Recording of the single took place in April 2023 at the Old Church Studio near Morpeth, Northumberland, with Fender accompanied by the Easington Colliery Band, a local brass band. The brass band arrangement was by experienced arranger Sandy Smith, who also put Fender in contact with the band.

== Composition and lyrics ==
Fender wrote the song from the perspective of his late grandfather, about his grandmother's struggles with dementia.

== Music video ==
The band's music video features "I, Daniel Blake" star Dave Johns, along with Philippa Blake and the Easington Colliery Band.

== Live performance ==
Fender performed the song, with the Easington Colliery Band conducted by arranger Sandy Smith, during the encores of his London Stadium concert and at all three of his concerts at St James' Park, Newcastle-upon-Tyne in 2025.
