= B'lieve I'm Goin Down... =

Studio album by Kurt Vile
- Released: September 25, 2015
- Genres: Indie rock; folk rock; indie folk; psychedelic folk
- Length: 60:54
- Label: Matador
- Producers: Kurt Vile; Rob Laakso; Kyle Spence; Rob Schnapf; Jesse Trbovich; Peter Katis (mixed by)

Kurt Vile chronology
It's a Big World Out There (And I Am Scared) (2013)	B'lieve I'm Goin Down... (2015)	Lotta Sea Lice (2017)

Singles from B'lieve I'm Goin Down...
- 1. "Pretty Pimpin" Released: July 21, 2015; 2. "Life Like This" Released: September 10, 2015; 3. "I'm an Outlaw" Released: July 11, 2016

B'lieve I'm Goin Down... is the sixth studio album by American indie rock musician Kurt Vile, released on September 25, 2015, on Matador Records. A deluxe edition, B'lieve I'm Goin (Deep) Down..., featuring six additional tracks, was released on the same day.

Produced primarily by Vile and his bandmate Rob Laakso, the album was recorded in ten different recording studios, with sessions often taking place late at night.

== Critical reception ==
Professional ratings
Aggregate scores
Source	Rating
AnyDecentMusic?	7.7/10
Metacritic	83/100
Review scores
Source	Rating
AllMusic	4/5 stars
The A.V. Club	A−
The Guardian	4/5 stars
The Independent	4/5 stars
Mojo	4/5 stars
Pitchfork	8.4/10
Q	4/5 stars
Rolling Stone	3.5/5 stars
Spin	8/10
Uncut	8/10

B'lieve I'm Goin' Down... received widespread critical acclaim, gaining an aggregate of 83/100 on Metacritic, indicating universal acclaim and garnered a 'Best New Music' title and was rated 8.4/10 in a review by Pitchfork.

=== Accolades ===
Accolades for B'lieve I'm Goin Down...
Publication	Accolade	Rank
The A.V. Club	The 15 Best Albums of 2015	12
Flood Magazine	Flood's Best of 2015	4
NME	NME's Albums of the Year 2015	11
Pitchfork	The 50 Best Albums of 2015	23
Pitchfork	Readers' Top 50 Albums	17
Stereogum	The 50 Best Albums of 2015	48

== Track listing ==
B'lieve I'm Goin Down... track listing
No.	Title	Length
1.	"Pretty Pimpin"	4:58
2.	"I'm an Outlaw"	4:21
3.	"Dust Bunnies"	4:38
4.	"That's Life, Tho (Almost Hate to Say)"	6:26
5.	"Wheelhouse"	6:14
6.	"Life Like This"	4:04
7.	"All in a Daze Work"	4:59
8.	"Lost My Head There"	6:55
9.	"Stand Inside"	5:12
10.	"Bad Omens"	2:50
11.	"Kidding Around"	4:27
12.	"Wild Imagination"	5:50

Amazon and iTunes pre-order bonus tracks
No.	Title	Length
13.	"B'lieve I'm Goin Down"	5:12
14.	"Bad Omens (No Faders)"	5:17

Deluxe edition tracks
No.	Title	Length
13.	"B'lieve I'm Goin Down"	5:12
14.	"Less Talk (More Walkin Away)"	3:59
15.	"Nicotine Blues"	4:56
16.	"Bad Omens (No Faders)"	5:17
17.	"No Stranger to the Ball Bust"	9:30
18.	"Sax Omens (J Turbo)"	2:17

== Personnel ==
Adapted from AllMusic.

- Gary Burden – art direction, design
- Greg Calbi – mastering
- Henry Diltz – cover photo
- Steve Fallone – assistant
- Greg Giorgio – assistant
- Jenice Heo – art direction, design
- Tommy Joy – engineer
- Farrah Katina – photography
- Peter Katis – mixing
- Andy Kravitz – engineer
- Rob Laakso – bass, drums, engineer, guitar, acoustic guitar, electric guitar, mixing, percussion, photography, producer, strings, synthesizer
- Jenny Lee Lindberg – vocals, backing vocals
- Kevin Morbey – vocals, backing vocals
- Stella Mozgawa – drums, percussion, synthesizer, vibraphone, backing vocals
- Brian Rosemeyer – assistant, assistant engineer
- Colin Rothwell – assistant
- Genevieve Schatz – vocals, backing vocals
- Farmer Dave Scher – guitar, keyboards, backing vocals
- Rob Schnapf – engineer, mixing, producer
- Katherine Sheehan – photography
- Justin Smith – engineer
- Kyle Spence – drums, engineer, percussion, producer
- Creston Spiers – horn
- Jesse Trbovich – bass, electric guitar, photography
- Kurt Vile – banjo, engineer, farfisa organ, acoustic guitar, electric guitar, keyboards, mellotron, noise, photography, piano, primary artist, producer, resonator, strings, backing vocals, wurlitzer
- Paul Vile – vocals, backing vocals
- The Violators – producer
- Mike Zimmerman – layout

== Charts ==
=== Weekly charts ===
Weekly chart performance for B'lieve I'm Goin Down...
Chart (2015)	Peak position
Australian Albums (ARIA)	27
Belgian Albums (Ultratop Flanders)	8
Belgian Albums (Ultratop Wallonia)	44
Dutch Albums (Album Top 100)	15
French Albums (SNEP)	99
German Albums (Offizielle Top 100)	86
Irish Albums (IRMA)	35
New Zealand Albums (RMNZ)	26
Norwegian Albums (VG-lista)	18
Portuguese Albums (AFP)	24
Swedish Albums (Sverigetopplistan)	26
Swiss Albums (Schweizer Hitparade)	45
UK Albums (Official Charts)	25
US Billboard 200	40
US Top Album Sales (Billboard)	27
US Top Alternative Albums (Billboard)	8
US Americana/Folk Albums (Billboard)	2
US Independent Albums (Billboard)	6
US Top Rock Albums (Billboard)	10
US Indie Store Album Sales (Billboard)	4
US Vinyl Albums (Billboard)	3

=== Year-end charts ===
Year-end chart performance for B'lieve I'm Goin Down...
Chart (2015)	Position
Belgian Albums (Ultratop Flanders)	177
