= Rob Laakso =

American musician (1979–2023)

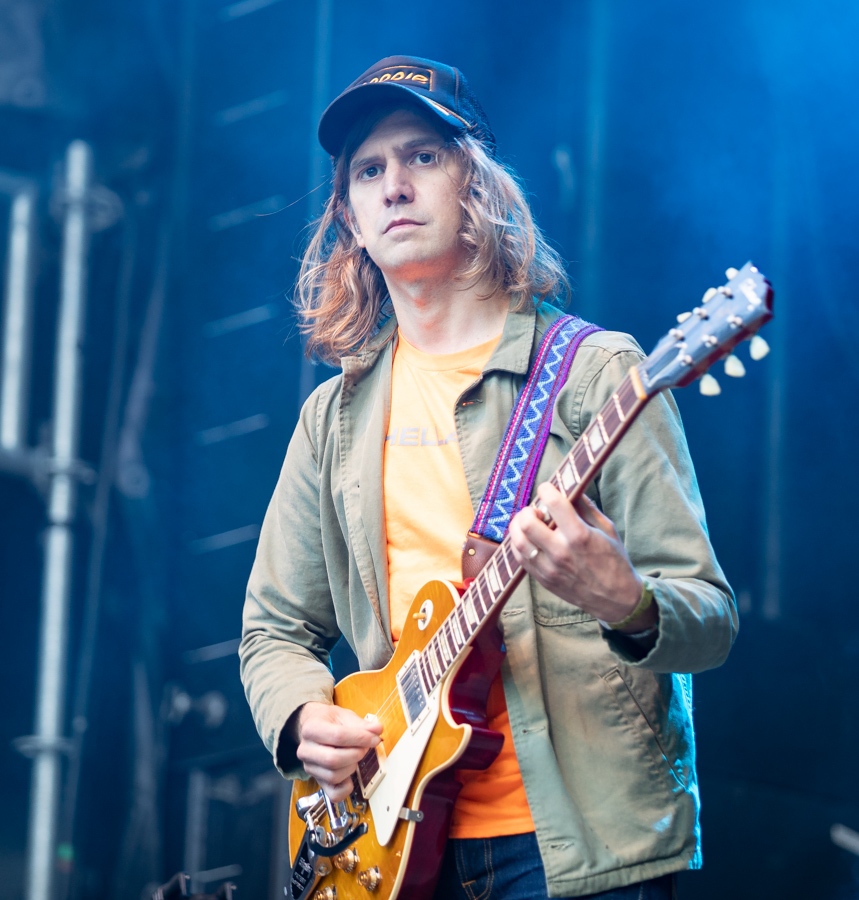
- Laakso performing in 2019

Background information
- Born: April 16, 1979; Massachusetts, U.S.
- Died: May 4, 2023 (aged 44)
- Genres: Indie rock, indie folk, lo-fi
- Occupation: Musician
- Instruments: Guitar, bass guitar, keyboards, synthesizers
- Label: Matador
- Formerly of: Kurt Vile & the Violators, Swirlies, Mice Parade, The Wicked Farleys, Diamond Nights
- Website: roblaakso.com

Rob Laakso (April 16, 1979 – May 4, 2023) was an American musician, record producer and engineer, best known as the recording partner of indie rock musician Kurt Vile and as a multi-instrumentalist in his backing band the Violators. Laakso also played in the shoegaze band Swirlies, among others. Born in Massachusetts in 1979, Laakso graduated from Emerson College.

After contributing to Vile's second and fourth studio albums, God Is Saying This to You... (2009) and Smoke Ring for My Halo (2011), Laakso became a full member of the Violators in 2011 after the departure of guitarist Adam Granduciel. After joining the band, Laakso contributed heavily to Vile's subsequent studio albums, Wakin on a Pretty Daze (2013), b'lieve I'm goin down... (2015), Bottle It In (2018) and (watch my moves) (2022).

Laakso died on May 4, 2023, at the age of 44, from cholangiocarcinoma, a fairly rare and aggressive form of cancer of the bile duct. He was married and had two children.

== Discography ==
With Kurt Vile

- God Is Saying This to You... (2009)
- Smoke Ring for My Halo (2011)
- So Outta Reach (2011)
- Wakin on a Pretty Daze (2013)
- It's a Big World Out There (And I Am Scared) (2013)
- b'lieve I'm goin down... (2015)
- Bottle It In (2018)
- (watch my moves) (2022)
- Back to Moon Beach (2023)

With Mice Parade

- Obrigado Saudade (2004)
- Mice Parade (2007)
- What It Means to Be Left-Handed (2010)

With Amazing Baby

- Rewild (2009)

Wth Diamond Nights

- Popsicle (2005)
- Once We Were Diamonds EP (2005)

With Swirlies

- Damon, Andy, Rob, Ron: The Yes Girls (2000)
- Cats of the Wild Volume 2 (2003)
- Swirlies' Magic Strop: Winsome Zamula's Hammer of Contumely (2005)

With The Wicked Farleys

- Sentinel and Enterprise (1998)
- Sustained Interest (1999)
- Make It It (2000)
