= God Is Saying This to You... =

Studio album by Kurt Vile
- Released: March 3, 2009
- Recorded: 2003–2008
- Genre: Indie rock, lo-fi
- Length: 27:58
- Label: Mexican Summer
- Producer: Kurt Vile

Kurt Vile chronology
Constant Hitmaker (2008)	God Is Saying This to You... (2009)	Childish Prodigy (2009)

Professional ratings
Review scores
Source	Rating
Pitchfork	7.6/10

God Is Saying This to You... is the second studio album by American lo-fi indie rock musician Kurt Vile, released in April 2009 on Mexican Summer records as a limited vinyl release. A repress of 2000 copies was released in 2010.

Similar to Vile's previous album, Constant Hitmaker (2008), the album is a compilation of home recordings recorded between 2003 and 2008. The album predominantly features material recorded prior to Constant Hitmaker, with Vile noting, "I put on really early songs, like from my first CD-R. I put them on there along with songs I had just recorded."

== Background and recording ==
Recorded between 2003 and 2008, God Is Saying This to You... is composed primarily of tracks previously self-released by Vile on CD-R. Regarding his former distribution method, Vile noted, "I was putting out CD-Rs as I went along and I wouldn’t always be recording. Just because I was putting out these CD-Rs didn’t mean it was all my new material. I’d just go through my best stuff. I feel like I’ve always done it where one song could be from two years ago, one is from right now, one is from five years ago, and I compile them in that way. Like a mixtape or something. I was always serious about it. It’s not much different now except that by the time of Constant Hitmaker (2008) — I found somebody to put that out — I just had all these recordings."

Lyrics from the song "Red Apples" subsequently appear on the track "Runners-Up" from Vile's 2011 album Smoke Ring for My Halo. Vile noted that the original track "was written when I only had a couple of lines I thought were good – my brother and I kind of jammed that song out together, to be honest. It was a sketch, but it just had a lot of vibe to it. This was before I had anything out yet, so it didn't matter what was where. I would switch lines out to see where they worked. I loved that stuff in The Fall; Mark E. Smith had all these recurring characters, like the Hip Priest, in his lyrics. He would come up different narrative concepts and recurring themes. You definitely hear bootlegs of Bob Dylan or Springsteen where, you know, you hear a variation of a lyric that ended up in another song. [...] "Beach On the Moon" intentionally uses lyrics from a bunch of my songs, which is why it's also called "(Recycled Lyrics)."

== Track listing ==
No.	Title	Length
1.	"God Is Saying This to You"	0:28
2.	"My Sympathy"	2:30
3.	"Red Apples"	4:17
4.	"Beach on the Moon (Recycled Lyrics)"	4:21
5.	"Can't Come"	1:32
6.	"Overnite KV"	1:17
7.	"Prom King"	1:47
8.	"My Best Friends (Don't Even Pass This)"	4:36
9.	"White Riffs"	0:48
10.	"Song for John in D"	3:37
11.	"Doctor Orgatron"	1:36
12.	"Frip Job"	1:09

== Personnel ==
Musicians

- Kurt Vile – vocals, guitar, various instruments
- Adam Granduciel – acoustic guitar (9)
- Jay Ganas – upright bass (10)
- Rob Laakso – guitar and drum machine (11)
- Luke Vile – mini bongos (3)

Recording personnel

- Kurt Vile – producer, recording
- Adam Granduciel – recording (8), additional mixing
- Dave Park – recording (10)
- Rob Laakso – producer (11)
- Jeff Zeigler – additional mixing

Artwork

- Sore Eros – Boston jam room photograph
