= Sore Eros =

American indie band

- Origin: Enfield, Connecticut, United States
- Genres: Psychedelic pop, lo-fi, experimental rock
- Years active: 2002–present
- Labels: Shdwply Records, Feeding Tube Records, Blackburn Recordings, Care in the Community, Night People
- Members: Robert Robinson; Adam Langellotti; Jeff Morkeski; Matt Jugenheimer
- Past members: Matt Brown, Andy Tomasello, Michael Centore
- Website: http://soreeros.bandcamp.com/

Sore Eros is an American indie band started by Robert Robinson around the early 2000s in Connecticut. It is branded as lo-fi pop music with psychedelic elements. In 2007 Robinson began collaborating with a long-lost friend, Adam Langellotti, which soon became their first official release, Second Chants. Sore Eros is now an equally collective effort incorporating Jeff Morkeski on lead guitar and Matt Jugenheimer on drums.

Sore Eros has been working on a new full-length album with Adam Granduciel of The War on Drugs producing. This project has been in the works for several years.

== Discography ==
- Second Chants (2009) Shdwply Records
- Know Touching (2010) Shdwply Records
- Taal Compass/Wide Open (2010) Blackburn Recordings
- Just Fuzz (2011) Blackburn Recordings
- Sickies Volume 1 (2011) Night People
- Sickies Volume 2 (2012) Feeding Tube Records
- 9" Lathe Cut Split w/ Kurt Vile (2012) Feeding Tube Records
- Kurt Vile/Sore Eros - Jamaica Plain 10" (2013) Care In The Community Records
- Say People (2015) LP/VHS Feeding Tube Records
- Sore Eros /self titled (2020) Double LP Feeding Tube Records
