= Adam Granduciel =

American singer-songwriter (born 1979)

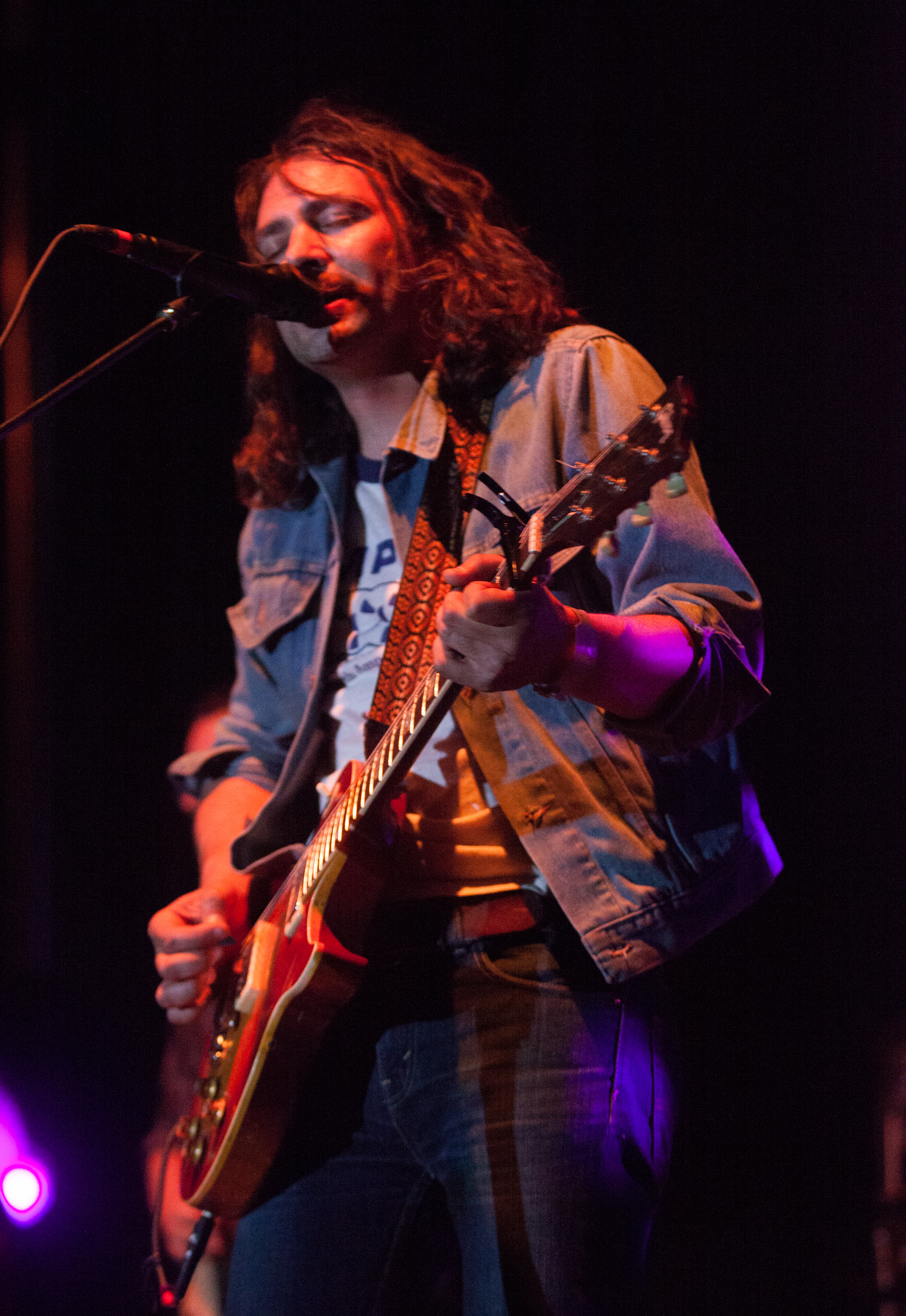
- Granduciel performing at Austin Psych Fest 2014

Background information
- Born: Adam Granofsky; February 15, 1979 (age 47); Dover, Massachusetts, U.S.
- Genres: Indie rock, heartland rock, Americana, shoegazing, neo-psychedelia, pop rock
- Instruments: Vocals, guitar, piano, bass guitar, harmonica keyboard, synthesizer
- Years active: 2003–present
- Labels: Secretly Canadian, Matador
- Partner: Krysten Ritter
- Website: www.thewarondrugs.net

Adam Granofsky (born February 15, 1979), better known under his stage name Adam Granduciel, is an American guitarist, singer, songwriter and record producer. He is the frontman and primary songwriter of the indie rock band the War on Drugs, with whom he has recorded five studio albums, and a former member of Kurt Vile's backing band the Violators.

In addition to his work with The War on Drugs and Kurt Vile & the Violators, Granduciel has made guest appearances on albums by The Killers, Beyoncé and Sharon Van Etten. As a record producer, he has produced albums for Sam Fender, Craig Finn and Purling Hiss, with Fender's 2025 single, "Rein Me In", which was co-produced by Granduciel, becoming the longest running number-one single in UK music history.

== Early life and education ==
Adam Granduciel was born in Dover, Massachusetts. His father Mark Granofsky is a first-generation American who was born to Russian-Jewish immigrants.

He attended the Roxbury Latin School where teacher Ken Conn made a French language pun which later inspired his stage name: replacing the "ofsky" in his surname with "du ciel", which means "of the sky" in French, with Granduciel translating to Big or Great of the Sky. He is a graduate of Dickinson College, where he studied painting and photography.

== Career ==
=== Production work ===
Granduciel produced and performed on the English singer-songwriter Sam Fender's third studio album, People Watching, with The War on Drugs set to support Fender on his UK stadium shows at London Stadium and Newcastle's St James' Park. Regarding working with Fender, Granduciel noted: "I fell in love with him. He’s a savant. Sam and the boys came out in March [2024] for about five weeks. We worked on some stuff they’d already started, then we worked on some more stuff from the ground up. It was awesome. I’d never met Sam, but we’d communicated once or twice. I have this picture above the sink in my kitchen, that I took of the boys. Sam, Joe [Atkinson], Dean [Thompson] and Drew, just hanging out in my studio. They inspire each other. It’s like my band: everyone can just sit there for fifteen hours and just hang. You don’t have a wildcard, everyone’s easy and loose, and musical, and good-hearted. It was a blast working together."

Granduciel produced the sixth solo studio album by The Hold Steady's Craig Finn, Always Been, which was released in 2025. The album features Granduciel's The War on Drugs bandmates appearing throughout the album.

== Personal life ==
Granduciel began a relationship with actress Krysten Ritter in August 2014. In February 2019, Ritter revealed that she and Granduciel were expecting their first child, who was born in 2019.

Granduciel is an avid golfer.

== Discography ==
=== The War on Drugs ===
Studio albums

- Wagonwheel Blues (2008)
- Slave Ambient (2011)
- Lost in the Dream (2014)
- A Deeper Understanding (2017)
- I Don't Live Here Anymore (2021)

EPs

- Barrel of Batteries (2007)
- Future Weather (2010)

=== Kurt Vile ===
Studio albums

- Constant Hitmaker (2008)
- God Is Saying This to You... (2009)
- Childish Prodigy (2009)
- Smoke Ring for My Halo (2011)

EPs

- The Hunchback EP (2009)
- Square Shells (2010)
- So Outta Reach (2011)

=== As producer ===
- Water on Mars — Purling Hiss (2013)
- People Watching — Sam Fender (2025)
- Always Been — Craig Finn (2025)

=== As guest performer ===
- Are We There — Sharon Van Etten (2014)
- Imploding the Mirage on "Blowback" — The Killers (2020)
- Cowboy Carter on "II Most Wanted" — Beyoncé (2024)
- "Old Tape" single - Lucius (2024)
