= Sam Fender discography =

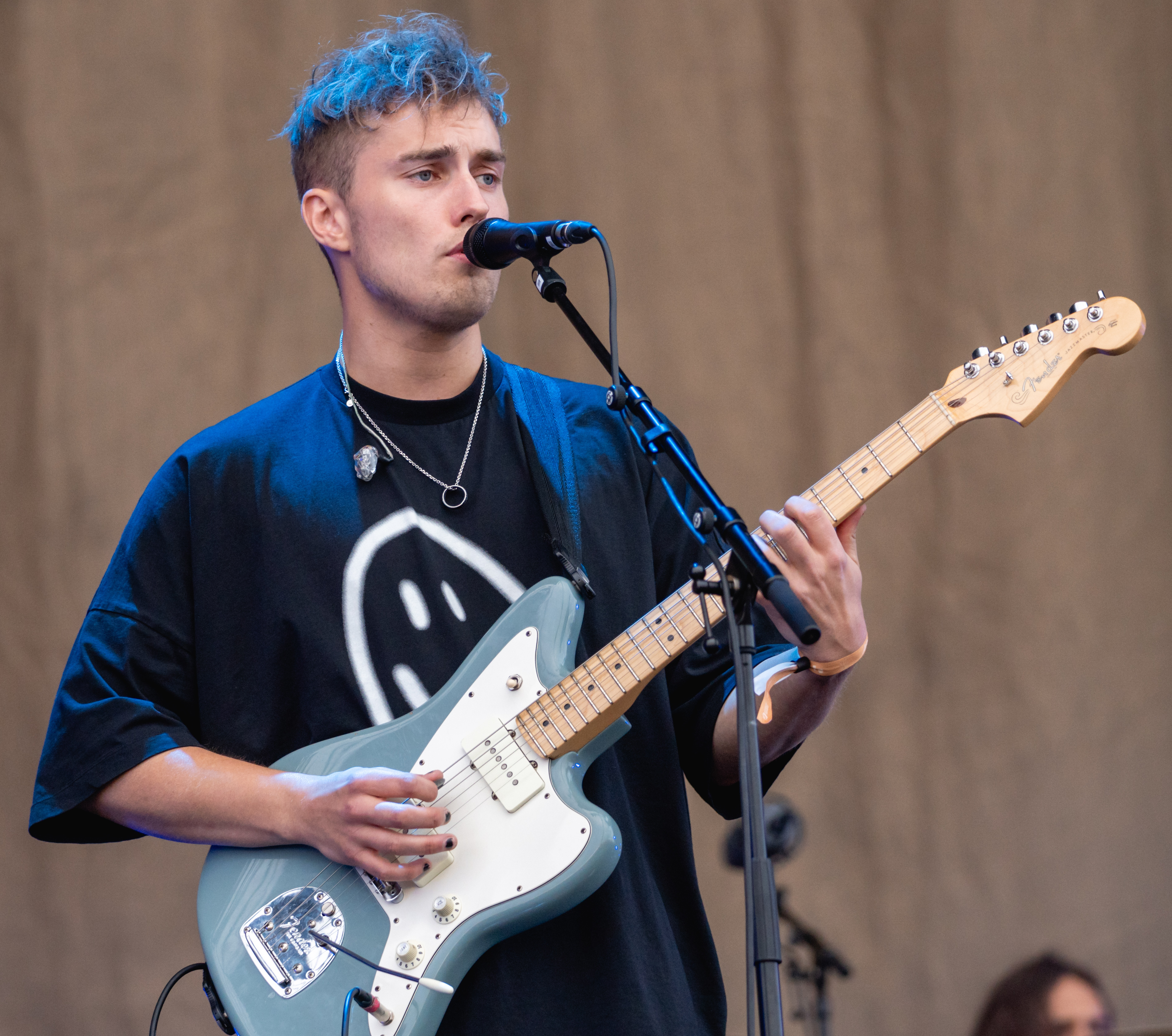
- Fender in August 2021
- Studio albums: 3
- EPs: 6
- Live albums: 1
- Singles: 34
- Music videos: 24
- Promotional singles: 4

The discography of English singer, songwriter, and musician Sam Fender consists of three studio albums, six EPs and one live album.

In 2017, Fender released a series of singles, including his debut single "Play God", which became his first entry on the UK Singles Chart and earned a platinum certification. That same year, he was named one of the BBC's Sound of 2018, alongside other emerging artists. In 2018 he issued his first EP, Dead Boys, featuring the singles "Leave Fast", "Dead Boys" and "That Sound".

Fender received the Brit Awards Critics’ Choice Award in 2019 and subsequently released his debut studio album, Hypersonic Missiles. The album debuted at number one on the UK Album Chart and generated the multi-platinum singles "Will We Talk?" and its title track.

His second studio album, Seventeen Going Under, was preceded by the title track, which became his first top-ten single in both the UK and Ireland. It ranked among the most successful songs of the year in the United Kingdom, finishing tenth on the year-end chart and receiving a 4× Platinum certification from the British Phonographic Industry. The album was released on October 2021 and topped the UK Album Chart. It also earned nominations for British Album of the Year at the 2022 Brit Awards and for the Mercury Prize.

In January 2024, Fender was featured on Noah Kahan's "Homesick", which reached the top ten in both the UK and Ireland and was certified Platinum in the UK. Later that year, he released "People Watching", the title track from his third studio album, which became another UK top-ten single and achieved Platinum status. The album followed in February 2025, debuting at number one with the biggest opening week for a British male solo artist since 2022 and the fastest-selling vinyl album by a British act in the 21st century. Its deluxe edition produced an additional top-ten single, "Rein Me In", a collaboration with Olivia Dean. People Watching went on to win the 2025 Mercury Prize.

== Albums ==
=== Studio albums ===
Title	Details	Peak chart positions										Sales	Certifications
Title	Details	UK	AUS	AUT	BEL (FL)	BEL (WA)	GER	IRE	NLD	SCO	SWI	Sales	Certifications
Hypersonic Missiles	Released: 13 September 2019; Label: Polydor; Formats: Digital download, streaming, CD, LP, cassette, MD	1	62	67	14	69	19	6	40	1	19	UK: 600,000 (Note: United Kingdom sales figures for Hypersonic Missiles as of November 2024.)	BPI: 2× Platinum
Seventeen Going Under	Released: 8 October 2021; Label: Polydor; Formats: Digital download, streaming, CD, LP, cassette, MD	1	46	56	16	87	6	4	27	1	5	UK: 377,819 (Note: United Kingdom sales figures for Seventeen Going Under as of November 2024.)	BPI: Platinum
People Watching	Released: 21 February 2025; Label: Polydor; Formats: Digital download, streaming, CD, LP, cassette, MD	1	17	9	2	21	4	2	2	1	7	UK: 224,260 (Note: United Kingdom sales figures for People Watching as of October 2025.)	BPI: Platinum; BRMA: Gold

=== Live albums ===
Title	Details	Peak chart positions		
Title	Details	UK	NL Vinyl	SCO
Live from Finsbury Park	Released: 9 December 2022; Label: Polydor; Format: LP	17	21	8

== Extended plays ==
Title	Details	Peak chart positions			Certifications
Title	Details	UK	NL Vinyl	SCO	Certifications
Dead Boys	Released: 20 November 2018; Label: Polydor; Formats: Digital download, streaming, cassette, LP	— (Note: "Dead Boys" did not enter the UK Albums Chart, but peaked at number 89 on the UK Album Sales Chart.)	—	—	BPI: Gold
Spotify Singles	Released: 31 October 2018; Label: Polydor; Formats: Streaming	—	—	—	
Live at Capitol Studios	Released: 20 December 2019; Label: Polydor; Formats: Streaming	—	—	—	
Deezer Sessions	Released: 21 January 2022; Label: Polydor; Formats: Streaming	—	—	—	
Apple Music Home Session: Sam Fender	Released: 28 January 2022; Label: Polydor; Formats: Streaming	— (Note: "Apple Music Home Session: Sam Fender" did not enter the UK Albums Chart, but peaked at number 88 on the UK Singles Sales Chart.)	—	—	
Me and the Dog	Released: 12 April 2025; Label: Polydor; Formats: CD, LP, digital download, streaming	14	16	2	
"—" denotes a recording that did not chart or was not released in that territory.

== Singles ==
=== As lead artist ===
Title	Year	Peak chart positions										Certifications	Album
Title	Year	UK	AUS	BEL (FL)	CAN	IRE	NLD	NZ	SWE	US	WW	Certifications	Album
"Play God"	2017	89	—	—	—	—	—	—	—	—	—	BPI: Platinum	Hypersonic Missiles
"Greasy Spoon"	2017	—	—	—	—	—	—	—	—	—	—		Non-album singles
"Millennial"	2017	—	—	—	—	—	—	—	—	—	—		Non-album singles
"Start Again"	2017	—	—	—	—	—	—	—	—	—	—		Non-album singles
"Friday Fighting"	2018	—	—	—	—	—	—	—	—	—	—		Non-album singles
"Leave Fast"	2018	—	—	—	—	—	—	—	—	—	—		Dead Boys / Hypersonic Missiles
"Dead Boys"	2018	—	—	—	—	—	—	—	—	—	—	BPI: Silver	Dead Boys / Hypersonic Missiles
"That Sound"	2018	— (Note: "That Sound" did not enter the UK Singles Chart, but peaked at number 87 on the UK Singles Sales Chart.)	—	— (Note: "That Sound" did not enter the Flanders Ultratop 50, but peaked at number three on the Ultratip chart.)	—	—	—	—	—	—	—	BPI: Silver	Dead Boys / Hypersonic Missiles
"Hypersonic Missiles"	2019	48	—	— (Note: "Hypersonic Missiles" did not enter the Flanders Ultratop 50, but peaked at number 13 on the Ultratip chart.)	—	—	—	—	—	—	—	BPI: 3× Platinum; RMNZ: Gold	Hypersonic Missiles
"Will We Talk?"	2019	43	—	— (Note: "Will We Talk?" did not enter the Flanders Ultratop 50, but peaked at number 22 on the Ultratip chart.)	—	96	— (Note: "Will We Talk?" did not enter the Netherlands' Single Top 100 but peaked on the Netherlands' Airplay Chart at number 43.)	—	—	—	—	BPI: 2× Platinum	Hypersonic Missiles
"The Borders"	2019	59	—	—	—	—	—	—	—	—	—	BPI: Platinum	Hypersonic Missiles
"Saturday"	2019	—	—	—	—	—	—	—	—	—	—	BPI: Gold	Hypersonic Missiles
"All Is on My Side"	2019	—	—	— (Note: "All Is on My Side" did not enter the Flanders Ultratop 50, but peaked at number 19 on the Ultratip chart.)	—	—	—	—	—	—	—	BPI: Silver	Non-album singles
"Hold Out"	2020	— (Note: "Hold Out" did not enter the UK Singles Chart, but peaked at number 100 on the UK Singles Downloads Chart.)	—	—	—	—	—	—	—	—	—		Non-album singles
"Winter Song"	2020	—	—	— (Note: "Winter Song" did not enter the Flanders Ultratop 50, but peaked at number 23 on the Ultratip chart.)	—	—	—	—	—	—	—		Non-album singles
"Seventeen Going Under"	2021	3	69	—	—	4	— (Note: "Seventeen Going Under" did not enter the Netherlands' Single Top 100 but peaked on the Netherlands' Single Tip Chart at number one.)	— (Note: "Seventeen Going Under" did not enter the NZ Top 40 Singles Chart, but peaked at number 13 on the NZ Hot Singles Chart.)	96	—	— (Note: "Seventeen Going Under" did not enter the Billboard Global 200, but peaked at number 161 on the Billboard Global Excl. US chart.)	BPI: 5× Platinum; RMNZ: Platinum	Seventeen Going Under
"Get You Down"	2021	48	—	—	—	—	—	—	—	—	—	BPI: Gold	Seventeen Going Under
"Spit of You"	2021	41	—	—	—	81	—	—	—	—	—	BPI: Platinum	Seventeen Going Under
"Long Way Off"	2021	— (Note: "Long Way Off" did not enter the UK Singles Chart, but peaked at number 82 on the UK Singles Sales Chart.)	—	—	—	—	—	—	—	—	—		Seventeen Going Under
"The Dying Light"	2021	—	—	—	—	—	—	—	—	—	—		Seventeen Going Under
"Getting Started"	2022	47	—	—	—	70	—	— (Note: "Getting Started" did not enter the NZ Top 40 Singles Chart, but peaked at number 38 on the NZ Hot Singles Chart.)	—	—	—	BPI: Platinum	Seventeen Going Under
"Alright"	2022	61	—	—	—	—	— (Note: "Alright" did not enter the Netherlands' Single Top 100 but peaked on the Dutch Tipparade Chart at number 24.)	—	—	—	—	BPI: Silver	Seventeen Going Under
"Wild Grey Ocean"	2022	71	—	—	—	91	— (Note: "Wild Grey Ocean" did not enter the Netherlands' Single Top 100 but peaked on the Dutch Tipparade Chart at number 23.)	—	—	—	—		Seventeen Going Under
"Homesick" (with Noah Kahan)	2024	5	57	—	64	4	— (Note: "Homesick" did not enter the Netherlands' Single Top 100 but peaked on the Netherlands' Single Tip Chart at number 16.)	— (Note: "Homesick" did not enter the NZ Top 40 Singles Chart, but peaked at number four on the NZ Hot Singles Chart.)	— (Note: "Homesick" did not enter the Swedish Singellista Chart, but peaked at number 19 on the Swedish Heatseeker Chart.)	— (Note: "Homesick" did not enter the Billboard Hot 100, but peaked at number 20 on the Bubbling Under Hot 100 chart.)	—	BPI: Platinum; ARIA: Platinum	Stick Season (Forever)
"People Watching"	2024	4	—	—	—	25	— (Note: "People Watching" did not enter the Netherlands' Single Top 100, but peaked at number 50 on the Netherlands' Airplay Top 50 Chart.)	— (Note: "People Watching" did not enter the NZ Top 40 Singles Chart, but peaked at number 24 on the NZ Hot Singles Chart.)	—	—	—	BPI: Platinum	People Watching
"Wild Long Lie"	2024	94	—	—	—	—	—	—	—	—	—		People Watching
"Arm's Length"	2025	14	—	—	—	46	— (Note: "Arm's Length" did not enter the Netherlands' Single Top 100, but peaked at number 30 on the Netherlands' Airplay Top 50 Chart.)	— (Note: "Arm's Length" did not enter the NZ Top 40 Singles Chart, but peaked at number 25 on the NZ Hot Singles Chart.)	—	—	—	BPI: Gold	People Watching
"Remember My Name"	2025	48	—	—	—	—	—	—	—	—	—		People Watching
"Little Bit Closer"	2025	24	—	—	—	70	—	— (Note: "Little Bit Closer" did not enter the NZ Top 40 Singles Chart, but peaked at number 16 on the NZ Hot Singles Chart.)	—	—	—	BPI: Silver	People Watching
"Tyrants"	2025	78	—	—	—	—	—	— (Note: "Tyrants" did not enter the NZ Top 40 Singles Chart, but peaked at number 34 on the NZ Hot Singles Chart.)	—	—	—		Me and the Dog / People Watching (Deluxe)
"Rein Me In" (solo or with Olivia Dean)	2025	1	1	37	35	1	3	1	25	45	32	BPI: 4× Platinum; ARIA: 2× Platinum; MC: Platinum; RIAA: Platinum; RMNZ: 4× Platinum	People Watching (Deluxe)
"Talk to You" (with Elton John)	2025	20	—	—	—	31	—	— (Note: "Talk to You" did not enter the NZ Top 40 Singles Chart, but peaked at number 13 on the NZ Hot Singles Chart.)	—	—	—		People Watching (Deluxe)
"I'm Always on Stage"	2025	—	—	—	—	—	—	— (Note: "I'm Always on Stage" did not enter the NZ Top 40 Singles Chart, but peaked at number 40 on the NZ Hot Singles Chart.)	—	—	—		People Watching (Deluxe)
"—" denotes a recording that did not chart or was not released in that territory.

=== As featured artist ===
Title	Year	Peak chart positions										Certifications	Album
Title	Year	UK	BEL (FL) Tip	CAN DL	EU	IRE	NL Tip	NZ Hot	SCO	US DL	US Rock	Certifications	Album
"Times Like These" (as part of Live Lounge Allstars)	2020	1	39	8	2	64	15	5	1	18	12	BPI: Silver	Non-album singles
"Going Home (Theme From Local Hero)" (as part of Mark Knopfler's Guitar Heroes)	2024	18	—	19	—	—	—	32	—	22	— (Note: "Going Home (Theme From Local Hero)" did not enter the US Hot Rock & Alternative Songs chart, but peaked at number one on the US Rock Digital Song Sales chart.)		Non-album singles
"—" denotes a recording that did not chart or was not released in that territory.

== Promotional singles ==
Title	Year	Peak chart positions		Album
Title	Year	UK	IRE	Album
"Back to Black" (BBC Radio 1 Live Session)	2020	—	—	Non-album promotional single
"Sad but True"	2021	—	—	The Metallica Blacklist
"Aye"	2021	—	—	Seventeen Going Under
"Howdon Aldi Death Queue"	2021	—	—	Non-album promotional singles
"You Can't Always Get What You Want"	2026	39	75	Non-album promotional singles

== Other charted and certified songs ==
Title	Year	Peak chart positions			Certifications	Album
Title	Year	UK	EST Air.	NZ Hot	Certifications	Album
"Poundshop Kardashians"	2018	—	*	—	BPI: Gold	Dead Boys
"Spice"	2018	—	*	—	BPI: Silver	Dead Boys
"You're Not the Only One"	2019	—	*	—	BPI: Silver	Hypersonic Missiles
"Call Me Lover"	2019	—	*	—	BPI: Silver	Hypersonic Missiles
"Angel in Lothian"	2021	—	—	—	BPI: Silver	Seventeen Going Under
"Nostalgia's Lie"	2025	— (Note: "Nostalgia's Lie" did not enter the UK Singles Chart, but peaked at number 61 on the UK Audio Streaming Chart.)	—	24		People Watching
"Chin Up"	2025	— (Note: "Chin Up" did not enter the UK Singles Chart, but peaked at number 57 on the UK Audio Streaming Chart.)	—	27		People Watching
"Crumbling Empire"	2025	— (Note: "Crumbling Empire" did not enter the UK Singles Chart, but peaked at number 81 on the UK Audio Streaming Chart.)	—	36		People Watching
"The Treadmill"	2025	— (Note: "The Treadmill" did not enter the UK Singles Chart, but peaked at number 82 on the UK Singles Downloads Chart.)	89	—		People Watching
"—" denotes a recording that did not chart or was not released in that territory. "*" denotes that the chart did not exist at that time.

== Guest appearances ==
Title	Year	Album
"Iris"	2024	Jackdaw
"The"	2025	Is This What We Want?

== Music videos ==
Title	Year	Director	Ref.
"Greasy Spoon"	2017	—N/a	
"Millennial"	2018	Jack Whitefield	
"Start Again"	2018	Jack Whitefield	
"Leave Fast"	2018	Jack Whitefield	
"Dead Boys"	2018	Vincent Haycock	
"That Sound"	2018	Tim Mattia	
"Poundshop Kardashians"	2018	—N/a	
"Spice"	2019	Jack Whitefield	
"Play God"	2019	Vincent Haycock	
"Hypersonic Missiles"	2019	Vincent Haycock	
"Will We Talk?"	2019	Vincent Haycock	
"The Borders"	2019	Thomas James	
"Saturday"	2019	James Slater	
"All Is on My Side"	2019	Jack Whitefield	
"Hold Out"	2020	Jack Whitefield	
"Seventeen Going Under"	2021	Brock Neal Roberts	
"Howdon Aldi Death Queue"	2021	Semera Khan	
"Spit of You"	2021	Philip Barantini	
"Get You Down"	2021	Hector Dockrill	
"Getting Started"	2022	Brock Neal Roberts	
"People Watching"	2025	Stuart A. McIntyre	
"Remember My Name"	2025	Hector Dockrill	
"Little Bit Closer"	2025	Philip Barantini	
"Rein Me In" (with Olivia Dean)	2025	Daniel Broadley	
