= People Watching Tour =

2024–25 concert tour by Sam Fender

- Tour by Sam Fender
- Promotional poster
- Location: Europe; North America; Oceania
- Associated album: People Watching
- Start date: 2 December 2024
- End date: 28 November 2025
- No. of shows: 52
- Supporting acts: Wunderhorse; CMAT; Olivia Dean; Young Jesus; The Pale White; Ernie; Hector Gannet; Holly Humberstone; Esha Tewari; Beddy Rays; Sycco; Day We Ran

Sam Fender concert chronology
- Seventeen Going Under Tour (2022); People Watching Tour (2024–2025); North America Tour (2027)

People Watching Tour was the third concert tour by English singer-songwriter Sam Fender, in support of his third studio album, People Watching (2025). It began on 2 December 2024, at the 3Arena in Dublin, Ireland, and concluded on 28 November 2025, at the Kings Park in Perth, Australia, comprising 56 shows across Europe, North America and Oceania. Wunderhorse, CMAT, Olivia Dean, Young Jesus, Holly Humberstone and others served as supporting acts.

== Background ==
On 15 October 2024, Fender launched a countdown clock on his website, teasing a major announcement. The following day, a portion of the tour poster, displaying only Fender's eyes, was revealed at major venues across the UK. On 18 October, the tour dates were announced, marking Fender's first UK tour since 2022 and including European dates in 2025. Due to high demand, tickets for the show were made available via a ballot for residents of Northeast England. Tickets went on sale on 25 October, with £1 from each ticket sold for the UK dates being donated to the Music Venue Trust, an organization that supported independent music venues. Fender also headlined BBC Radio 1's Big Weekend on 24 May 2025 at Sefton Park in Liverpool.

== Philanthropy ==
When announcing the tour, Fender revealed that £1 from every ticket sold for the UK dates would be donated to Music Venue Trust, in support of grassroots venues. The initiative raised over £100,000 which helped support 38 grassroots music venues across the UK. According to the Music Venue Trust, the funds provided urgent emergency assistance to 19 venues facing potential closure and over £50,000 in improvement grants to another 19 venues, enabling essential upgrades to facilities, equipment and infrastructure. On 19 April 2026, it was announced that a £25,000 donation from the tour proceeds had been made to AutismAble, a South Shields-based community interest company serving people with autism and learning difficulties. The contribution was matched by the charity Youth Music, totaling £50,000 for the "Future Collaborations" music outreach programme.

== Concert film ==
On 5 November 2025, Fender released the trailer for the concert film and announced its upcoming release in partnership with YouTube. The film, titled Sam Fender - Live at London Stadium, was released on 15 November 2025 and was recorded on 6 June 2025 during his performance at the venue. The concert film also features an appearance by Olivia Dean, who performed "Rein Me In" with Fender on that date.

== Set list ==
This set list was taken from the show in Dublin on 2 December 2024. It does not represent all shows throughout the tour.

1. "The Kitchen"
2. "Getting Started"
3. "The Borders"
4. "Wild Long Lie"
5. "All Is on My Side"
6. "Nostalgia's Lie"
7. "Arm's Length"
8. "Will We Talk?"
9. "People Watching"
10. "Spice"
11. "Howdon Aldi Death Queue"
12. "Get You Down"
13. "Spit of You"
14. "Seventeen Going Under"
  Encore
15. "Hypersonic Missiles"

== Tour dates ==
List of 2024 concerts, showing date, city, country and venue
Date (2024)	City	Country	Venue	Opening acts
2 December	Dublin	Ireland	3Arena	Wunderhorse
4 December	Leeds	England	First Direct Arena	Wunderhorse
6 December	Manchester	England	Co-op Live	Wunderhorse
7 December	Manchester	England	Co-op Live	Wunderhorse
10 December	London	England	The O_{2} Arena	Wunderhorse
12 December	London	England	The O_{2} Arena	Wunderhorse
13 December	Birmingham	England	Utilita Arena	Wunderhorse
16 December	Glasgow	Scotland	OVO Hydro	Wunderhorse

List of 2025 concerts, showing date, city, country and venue
Date (2025)	City	Country	Venue	Opening acts	Attendance
4 March	Paris	France	Olympia	CMAT	—N/a
5 March	Tilburg	Netherlands	013	CMAT	—N/a
8 March	Zurich	Switzerland	Halle 622	CMAT	—N/a
10 March	Cologne	Germany	Palladium	CMAT	—N/a
12 March	Munich	Germany	Zenith	CMAT	—N/a
13 March	Bergamo	Italy	ChorusLife Arena	CMAT	—N/a
16 March	Berlin	Germany	Uber Eats Music Hall	CMAT	—N/a
18 March	Amsterdam	Netherlands	AFAS Live	CMAT	—N/a
19 March	Brussels	Belgium	Forest National	CMAT	—N/a
5 April	Vancouver	Canada	Doug Mitchell Thunderbird Sports Centre	Young Jesus	—N/a
7 April	Seattle	United States	Paramount Theatre	Young Jesus	—N/a
9 April	Portland	United States	Roseland Theater	Young Jesus	—N/a
11 April	Oakland	United States	Fox Theater	Young Jesus	—N/a
21 April	Tempe	United States	Marquee Theater	Young Jesus	—N/a
23 April	Salt Lake City	United States	The Union Event Center	Young Jesus	—N/a
24 April	Denver	United States	The Fillmore	Young Jesus	—N/a
24 May (Note: The concert on 24 May 2025, at Sefton Park in Liverpool is part of BBC Radio 1's Big Weekend.)	Liverpool	England	Sefton Park	—N/a	—N/a
6 June	London	England	London Stadium	Olivia Dean; CMAT	82,500
12 June	Newcastle	England	St. James' Park	CMAT; The Pale White	—N/a
14 June	Newcastle	England	St. James' Park	Olivia Dean; CMAT; Ernie	—N/a
15 June	Newcastle	England	St. James' Park	Olivia Dean; CMAT; Hector Gannet	—N/a
21 June (Note: The concert on 21 June 2025, at Eichenring in Scheeßel is part of Hurricane Festival.)	Scheeßel	Germany	Eichenring	—N/a	—N/a
22 June (Note: The concert on 22 June 2025, at Take Off Park in Neuhausen ob Eck is part of Southside Festival.)	Neuhausen ob Eck	Germany	Take Off Park	—N/a	—N/a
3 July (Note: The concert on 3 July 2025, at Silverstone Circuit in Silverstone is part of The British Grand Prix.)	Silverstone	England	Silverstone Circuit	—N/a	—N/a
8 August (Note: The concert on 8 August 2025, at Valbyparken in Copenhagen is part of Sydforsolen Festival.)	Copenhagen	Denmark	Valbyparken	—N/a	—N/a
16 August	Manchester	England	Wythenshawe Park	Olivia Dean	—N/a
22 August	Edinburgh	Scotland	Royal Highland Showgrounds	Olivia Dean	—N/a
28 August	Belfast	Northern Ireland	Boucher Road Playing Fields	CMAT	—N/a
30 August (Note: The concert on 30 August 2025, at Stradbally Hall in Stradbally is part of Electric Picnic Festival.)	Stradbally	Ireland	Stradbally Hall	—N/a	—N/a
17 September	Boston	United States	Roadrunner	Young Jesus	—N/a
19 September	New York	United States	Terminal 5	Young Jesus	—N/a
21 September	Philadelphia	United States	The Fillmore	Young Jesus	—N/a
23 September	Washington, D.C.	United States	The Anthem	Young Jesus	—N/a
25 September	Chicago	United States	Aragon Ballroom	Young Jesus	—N/a
27 September (Note: The concert on 27 September 2025, at Forest Park in St. Louis is part of Evolution Music Festival.)	St. Louis	United States	Forest Park	—N/a	—N/a
28 September (Note: The concert on 28 September 2025, at The Park at Harlinsdale in Franklin is part of Pilgrimage Festival.)	Franklin	United States	The Park at Harlinsdale	—N/a	—N/a
1 October	Laval	Canada	Place Bell	Young Jesus	—N/a
3 October	Toronto	Canada	Coca-Cola Coliseum	Young Jesus	—N/a
14 November	Melbourne	Australia	Sidney Myer Music Bowl	Holly Humberstone; Beddy Rays; Day We Ran	—N/a
15 November	Melbourne	Australia	Sidney Myer Music Bowl	Holly Humberstone; Beddy Rays; Sycco	—N/a
19 November	Brisbane	Australia	Riverstage	Holly Humberstone; Sycco	—N/a
21 November	Sydney	Australia	The Showring, Entertainment Quarter	Holly Humberstone; Beddy Rays; Day We Ran	—N/a
25 November	Adelaide	Australia	Entertainment Centre Arena	Holly Humberstone; Esha Tewari	—N/a
28 November	Perth	Australia	Kings Park	Holly Humberstone; Esha Tewari	—N/a

== Cancelled shows ==
List of cancelled concerts, showing date, city, country, venue, and reason for cancellation
Date	City	Country	Venue	Reason
17 December 2024	Glasgow	Scotland	OVO Hydro	Vocal cord damage
20 December 2024	Newcastle	England	Utilta Arena	Vocal cord damage
11 February 2025	New York	United States	Webster Hall	Health issues
5 July 2025 (Note: The concert on 5 July 2025, at Werchter Festivalpark in Werchter is part of Rock Werchter Festival.)	Werchter	Belgium	Werchter Festivalpark	Vocal cord hemorrhage
6 July 2025 (Note: The concert on 6 July 2025, at Recreatiegebied Groene Heuvels in Ewijk is part of Down The Rabbit Hole Festival.)	Ewijk	Netherlands	Recreatiegebied Groene Heuvels	Vocal cord hemorrhage
11 July 2025 (Note: The concert on 11 July 2025, at Passeio Marítimo de Algés in Oeiras is part of NOS Alive Festival.)	Oeiras (Note: Billed as Lisbon on the singer's official website.)	Portugal	Passeio Marítimo de Algés	Vocal cord hemorrhage
15 July 2025 (Note: The concert on 15 July 2025, at Montreux Music & Convention Centre in Montreux is part of Montreux Jazz Festival.)	Montreux	Switzerland	Montreux Music & Convention Centre	Vocal cord hemorrhage
