= Dead Boys (EP) =

EP by Sam Fender
- Released: 20 November 2018
- Recorded: 2017–2018
- Genre: Rock; indie rock; heartland rock
- Length: 17:34
- Label: Polydor
- Producer: Bramwell Bronte

Sam Fender chronology
| Dead Boys (2018) | Hypersonic Missiles (2019) |

Singles from Dead Boys
- 1. "Leave Fast" Released: 14 June 2018; 2. "Dead Boys" Released: 14 August 2018; 3. "That Sound" Released: 22 October 2018

Dead Boys is the debut extended play by English musician, Sam Fender. The EP was released on 20 November 2018 through Polydor Records. The EP includes the singles "Leave Fast", "Dead Boys" and "That Sound" which were later included on Fender's debut studio album Hypersonic Missiles (2019).

== Background ==
Sam Fender grew up in North Shields in North Tyneside. He began listening to Bruce Springsteen's albums after his brother introduced him to the albums Darkness on the Edge of Town and Born to Run. At the age of 13 he began to write his own music inspired by Springsteen as well as Oasis and Joni Mitchell. He started to perform open mic nights with his brother where he would cover Jimi Hendrix songs as well as nineties indie rock songs. After he turned 18 he began performing paid gigs at restaurants.

At the age of 18, he was spotted performing by Ben Howard's manager who quickly took him on as a client. Following brief acting roles on the shows Vera and Wolfblood, Fender released his debut single "Play God" on 30 March 2017. It was Fender's first single to chart, reaching number 51 in Scotland and 89 on the UK Singles Chart. "Play God" was featured on the soundtrack for FIFA 19.

In 2018, Fender was placed on BBC's Sound of 2018 shortlist alongside Billie Eilish, Khalid, Lewis Capaldi and winner Sigrid. He released his single "Dead Boys" which was premiered as Annie Mac's Hottest Record in the World. Fender released his debut EP, Dead Boys, on 20 November 2018, featuring the album tracks "Dead Boys", "That Sound" and "Leave Fast". Alongside the EP's release, he embarked on a UK headline tour which included 3 nights at "Omeara" in London.

Talking about the EP, Rough Trade wrote, "Dead Boys deals explicitly with male suicide and mental health issues, and has caused outpourings of emotion among a growing band of followers", noted the "slower, plantive chords" of Leave Fast and "spiky riffing" on Poundshop Kardashians, and said that "That Sound wriggles and bangs through a melody that supports the big-hearted idea that music keeps Sam Fender on the straight and narrow."

In 2019, Fender won the Critics' Choice Award at the Brit Awards.

== Critical reception ==
Dominic Lee from The Courier, gave the EP a positive review, stating, "The Prelude opens with a beautiful arpeggio guitar segment overlayed with cascading strings and Sam’s distant vocals crying out in an almost hymn-like introduction before the guitar deepens in the transition to the title track. [...] Fender shows real lyrical talent on this track, resonating with issues that many men- and people in general- are often reluctant to talk about and bringing them to the forefront of his music."

== Track listing ==
All tracks are written by Sam Fender.

| No. | Title | Producer(s) | Length |
|---|---|---|---|
| 1. | "Dead Boys" (Prelude) | Bramwell Bronte | 2:00 |
| 2. | "Dead Boys" | Bronte | 3:21 |
| 3. | "Spice" | Bronte | 2:21 |
| 4. | "Poundshop Kardashians" | Bronte | 2:39 |
| 5. | "That Sound" | Bronte | 3:25 |
| 6. | "Leave Fast" | Bronte | 3:47 |

== Charts ==
| Chart (2018) | Peak position |
|---|---|
| UK Vinyl Albums (OCC) | 37 |

== Certifications ==
| Region | Certification | Certified units/sales |
|---|---|---|
| United Kingdom (BPI) | Gold | 100,000^{‡} |
^{‡} Sales+streaming figures based on certification alone.

== Release history ==
| Country | Release date | Format | Label |
|---|---|---|---|
| United Kingdom | 20 November 2018 | Digital download; streaming; cassette; LP | Polydor Universal |
