= Proper Massive Stadium Tour =

2027 concert tour by Sam Fender

- Tour by Sam Fender
- Promotional poster
- Location: United Kingdom
- Start date: 3 June 2027
- End date: 2 September 2027
- Legs: 1
- No. of shows: 12
- Supporting act: Wunderhorse
- Website: samfender.com

Sam Fender concert chronology
- North America Tour (2027); Proper Massive Stadium Tour (2027)

The Proper Massive Stadium Tour is the fifth upcoming concert tour by English singer-songwriter Sam Fender, in support of his upcoming fourth studio album. It will begin on 3 June 2027, in Newcastle, with shows across England, Wales, Ireland and Scotland. The tour will conclude in London on 2 September 2027, comprising 12 shows.

== Background and announcement ==
In October, Fender began teasing a stadium tour for 2027, with a countdown on his official website going live on 20 October 2026. On 19 October, he posted a video on social media featuring two members of his band competing to launch pyrotechnics at various stadiums and venues across the United Kingdom and Ireland. Inspired by The Lord of the Rings, the video followed an advertisement for "SF27" shown during Newcastle United's match against Aston Villa at St. James Park over the preceding weekend. The clip's caption read "The Beacons Are Lit!". On 21 October, at the end of the countdown, Fender announced the Proper Massive Stadium Tour.

== Criticism regarding ticket prices ==
Days after announcing the tour, Fender responded to criticism of ticket prices, stating that he was "not happy with these prices" and assuring fans that "they're getting changed". He subsequently announced that the front-standing category would be removed from the UK dates, with general admission standing tickets priced at £85 and seated tickets at £55, £75 and £95, excluding venue and ticketing fees. Fender also criticised the division of standing tickets into separate sections, while acknowledging rising production costs and additional ticketing fees.

== Philanthropy ==
As part of the tour's ticket sales, £1 from each ticket was allocated to Live Trust, an organisation that supports the grassroots music ecosystem in the United Kingdom.

== Tour dates ==
List of 2027 concerts, showing date, city, country and venue
Date (2027)	City	Country	Venue	Opening acts
3 June	Newcastle	England	St James' Park	Wunderhorse
5 June	Newcastle	England	St James' Park	Wunderhorse
10 June	Cardiff	Wales	Principality Stadium	Wunderhorse
12 June	Cardiff	Wales	Principality Stadium	Wunderhorse
18 June	London	England	Wembley Stadium	Wunderhorse
20 June	London	England	Wembley Stadium	Wunderhorse
1 July	Dublin	Ireland	Marlay Park	—N/a
8 July	Edinburgh	Scotland	Murrayfield Stadium	Wunderhorse
10 July	Edinburgh	Scotland	Murrayfield Stadium	Wunderhorse
15 July	Manchester	England	Etihad Stadium	Wunderhorse
17 July	Manchester	England	Etihad Stadium	Wunderhorse
2 September	London	England	Wembley Stadium	—N/a
