= Hypersonic Missiles (album) =

Studio album by Sam Fender
- Released: 13 September 2019
- Recorded: December 2017 – January 2019
- Genre: Indie rock; heartland rock; British rock; pop rock
- Length: 48:21
- Label: Polydor
- Producer: Bramwell Bronte; Rich Costey; Sam Fender

Sam Fender chronology
Dead Boys (2018)	Hypersonic Missiles (2019)	Seventeen Going Under (2021)

Singles from Hypersonic Missiles
- 1. "Play God" Released: 30 March 2017; 2. "Leave Fast" Released: 14 June 2018; 3. "Dead Boys" Released: 14 August 2018; 4. "That Sound" Released: 22 October 2018; 5. "Hypersonic Missiles" Released: 5 March 2019; 6. "Will We Talk?" Released: 2 July 2019; 7. "The Borders" Released: 2 September 2019; 8. "Saturday" Released: 11 November 2019

Hypersonic Missiles is the debut studio album by English musician Sam Fender, released on 13 September 2019 by Polydor Records. The album debuted at number one on the UK Albums Chart, number one on the Scottish Albums Chart, and number six on the Irish Albums Chart. It sold over 41,000 copies in the first week on the UK Albums Chart and was the 11th best selling vinyl album of 2019. As of October 2021, the album has sold over 230,000 copies.

The album was supported by eight singles, with previously released single, "Play God", serving as the album’s lead single. This was followed by the release of "Leave Fast", "Dead Boys" and "That Sound", all of which appeared on the Dead Boys extended play. "Hypersonic Missiles", "Will We Talk?" and "The Borders" were released as the album’s fifth, sixth, and seventh singles respectively, while “Saturday” was released as the final single from the album. Hypersonic Missiles was acclaimed by critics, with particular praise toward Fender's lyricism and stylistic influences.

== Background ==
On 6 March 2019, Fender released the title track of Hypersonic Missiles. The song was described by Fender himself as an "unorthodox love song." On 6 July, he announced the album alongside the release of the single "Will We Talk?". As well as this, he announced his biggest UK tour to date which completely sold out and included two nights at O2 Brixton Academy and four nights at O2 Academy Newcastle. Following the album's announcement, Fender performed the fastest selling date ever at the Mouth of the Tyne Festival as well as supporting Bob Dylan and Neil Young at Hyde Park, London.

Fender built his own studio in his hometown of North Shields to record the album with money from his record label. He worked with his long-time friend and producer Bramwell Bronte on the record despite the suggestion from his record label to work with a high brow producer, a fact that Fender has said he is proud of.

== Music and lyrics ==
Hypersonic Missiles drew heavy comparisons to Bruce Springsteen due to Fender's "lyricism and his vignettes of working-class struggle." The title track was described by Fender as being inspired by a "newly developed Russian missile that travels at something like nine times the speed of sound" as well as describing the song's protagonist as being a "tin foil hatter." The track "The Borders" was described by Fender as his favourite and most personal song on the album and describes the "story of two boys growing up together and then going their separate ways." NME described the track as "chest-punching". "The Borders" recounts events that Fender experienced from the age of 8 when he grew up partly in Scotland with his mother. The Guardian described the track's "hypnotic, motorik beats" as well as the drum machines on "You're Not the Only One" to the War on Drugs. Fender tackles his own entitlement on the track "White Privilege" and has said that his white privilege "has affected my success, definitely, white boy with a guitar, fucking great, original, here comes another one."

"Dead Boys" tackles the theme of male suicide and mental health issues and was written as a reaction to losing a friend to suicide. The track has been described as "stark" and "cathartic." The track "Play God" was described by Fender being "set in an alternate dystopian reality that shares similarities with our own world." "That Sound" was described as being "a celebration of music" and "a not-so-subtle middle finger to the naysayers that tend to rear their heads as soon as things start to work out for you, especially back home." Clash magazine described it as "crisp power pop, it soars towards the crunching chorus, a real ear-worm that stays stuck in your head for days."

"Saturday" was described by Fender at a gig at Electric Brixton in London as being about "hating your landlord." "Will We Talk?" was described as "a heady blast of high-octane, melody-packed, smash'n'grab rock'n'roll that launches from the traps at full pelt and doesn't relent until the guitars and a string-section subside three minutes later." The track is about one-night stands and is inspired by "The Cut" nightclub in Newcastle. "Call Me Lover" is about infidelity and was inspired by an affair with a married woman that Fender had at 19. He also described the track as one of the few "pop songs" on the album. "Leave Fast" was described by The Line of Best Fit as "an excellent study on provincial fear." The track stems from the fear of staying in your hometown forever. The track "Use" was described by Pitchfork as entering Nina Simone-inspired territory.

Hypersonic Missiles has been characterised as heartland rock indie rock, British rock, incorporating elements of Americana, post-punk, and pop rock.

== Critical reception ==
Professional ratings
Aggregate scores
Source	Rating
Metacritic	81/100
Review scores
Source	Rating
AllMusic	4/5 stars
Clash	8/10
The Guardian	4/5 stars
The Independent	4/5 stars
The Line of Best Fit	8.5/10
NME	4/5 stars
Pitchfork	6.1/10
The Skinny	4/5 stars
The Telegraph	4/5 stars
The Times	4/5 stars

Hypersonic Missiles received widespread acclaim from music critics. At Metacritic, which assigns a normalized rating out of 100 to reviews from mainstream publications, the album received an average score of 81 based on 11 reviews, indicating "universal acclaim". Alexis Petridis of The Guardian praised the album, calling it "perfectly imperfect rock". Jordan Basset of the NME after giving the album 4 out of 5, added that "the Geordie Springsteen's debut excels at documenting small-town frustration, which is why he means so much to so many people. This album isn't perfect, but he's a welcome antidote to polite chaps with guitars". AllMusic claimed "it reveals itself to be a fitting soundtrack to the weekend, addressing hopes and frustrations with a persistent intensity and rousing melodies that fall in line with the catharsis at hand." Will Hodgkinson of The Times called Hypersonic Missiles "a believable, passionate album". In a more mixed review, Pitchfork claimed that the album had a lack of focus and was full of "mostly formulaic arrangements".

=== Year-end lists ===
Publication	Accolade	Rank	Ref.
Clash	Top 20 Albums of 2019	13	
Gigwise	Top 51 Albums of 2019	14	
The Independent	Top 50 Albums of 2019	20	
NME	Top 50 Albums of 2019	38	

== Track listing ==
Adapted from Sam Fender's online store.

All tracks are written by Sam Fender.

No.	Title	Producer(s)	Length
1.	"Hypersonic Missiles"	Bramwell Bronte	3:57
2.	"The Borders"	Bronte	5:32
3.	"White Privilege"	Bronte	3:29
4.	"Dead Boys"	Bronte	3:23
5.	"You're Not the Only One"	Bronte	4:35
6.	"Play God"	Bronte	3:45
7.	"That Sound"	Bronte	3:25
8.	"Saturday"	Bronte; Rich Costey	3:01
9.	"Will We Talk?"	Bronte; Sam Fender; Costey	2:42
10.	"Two People"	Bronte	3:56
11.	"Call Me Lover"	Bronte; Costey; Fender	3:21
12.	"Leave Fast"	Bronte	3:44
13.	"Use" (live)		3:31
Total length:			48:21

Japan bonus tracks
No.	Title	Producer(s)	Length
14.	"Spice"	Bronte	2:23
15.	"Poundshop Kardashians"	Bronte	2:41
Total length:			53:57

== Personnel ==
Adapted from Discogs.

- Sam Fender – vocals, guitar, bass, piano, synth, production (tracks 9 and 11)
- Tom Ungerer – bass
- Drew Michael – drums
- Joe Atkinson – synthesizer, sound design
- Johnny 'Blue Hat' Davis – saxophone
- John Waugh – saxophone
- Ed Smith - drums (track 6)

Additional personnel

- Bramwell Bronte – production (all tracks), mixing (13)
- Rich Costey – production (8, 9 and 11), mixing (1–5, 7–11)
- Barny Barnicott – mixing (6 and 12)
- Dean Thompson – engineering
- Joe LaPorta – mastering (2, 5, 8 and 11)
- Robin Schmidt – mastering (1, 3–4, 6–7, 9 and 13)

== Charts ==
=== Weekly charts ===
Chart (2019)	Peak position
Australian Albums (ARIA)	62
Austrian Albums (Ö3 Austria)	67
Belgian Albums (Ultratop Flanders)	14
Belgian Albums (Ultratop Wallonia)	69
Dutch Albums (Album Top 100)	40
German Albums (Offizielle Top 100)	19
Irish Albums (IRMA)	6
Scottish Albums (Official Charts)	1
Swiss Albums (Schweizer Hitparade)	19
UK Albums (Official Charts)	1
US Heatseekers Albums (Billboard)	12
US Top Current Album Sales (Billboard)	90

=== Year-end charts ===
Chart (2019)	Position
UK Albums (OCC)	40

Chart (2020)	Position
UK Albums (OCC)	72

Chart (2022)	Position
UK Albums (OCC)	65

== Certifications ==
Region	Certification	Certified units/sales
United Kingdom (BPI)	2× Platinum	600,000^{‡}
^{‡} Sales+streaming figures based on certification alone.

== See also ==
- List of UK Albums Chart number ones of the 2010s
