= Wunderhorse =

English rock band

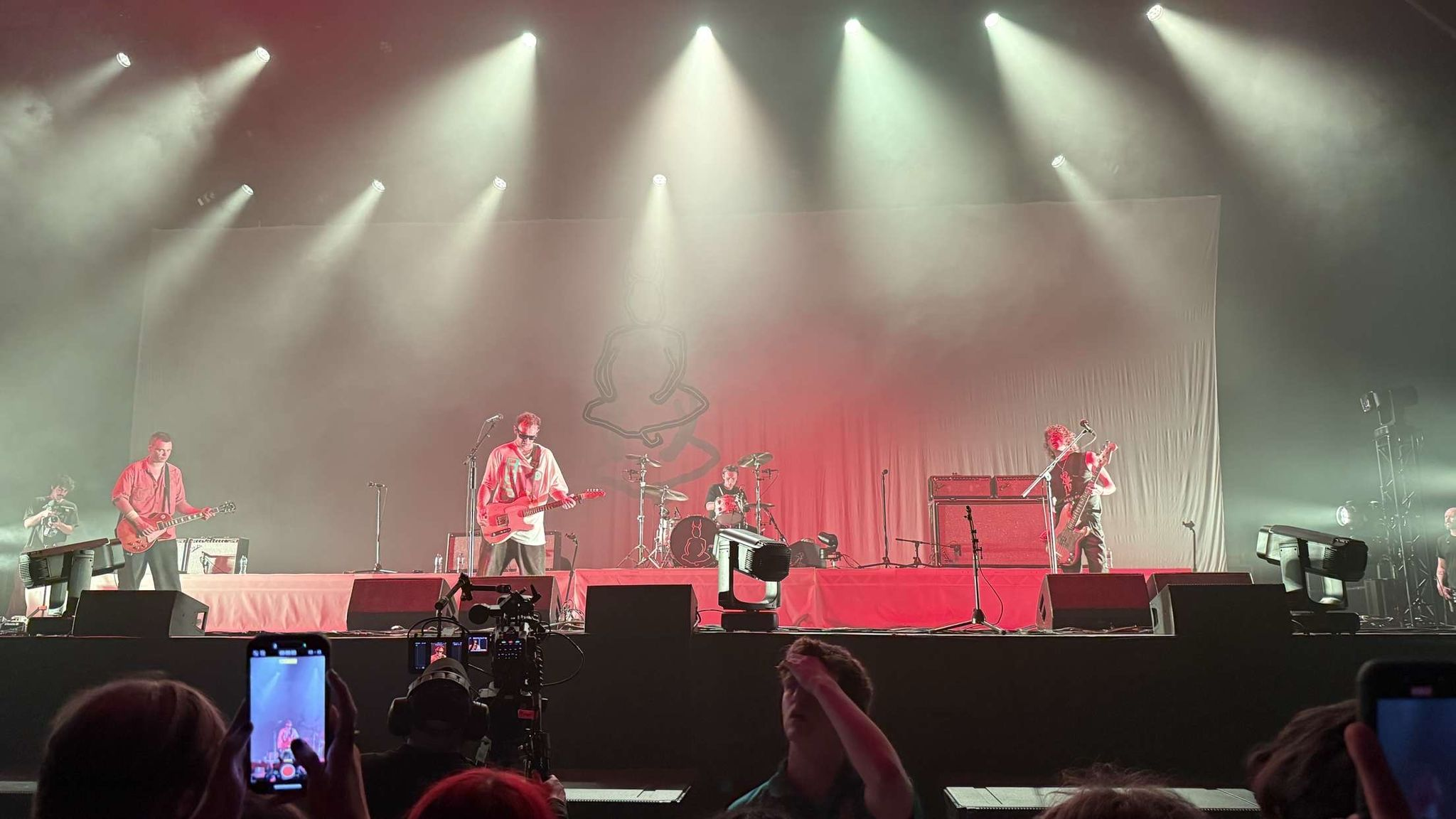
- Wunderhorse at Alexandra Palace 2025

Background information
- Origin: Newquay, Cornwall, England
- Genres: Alternative rock; indie rock; grunge; Americana
- Years active: 2020–present
- Label: Communion
- Spinoff of: Dead Pretties
- Members: Jacob Slater; Jamie Staples; Harry Fowler; Seb Byford
- Past members: Oscar Browne; Peter Woodin
- Website: wunderhorseband.com

Wunderhorse are a British rock band formed in 2020 by frontman and songwriter Jacob Slater. Initially a solo project, Wunderhorse became a full band in 2021, with Slater (vocals, guitar) being joined by Harry Fowler (guitar), Pete Woodin (bass) and Jamie Staples (drums). Woodin has since been replaced by Seb Byford. They have released two albums and toured internationally.

Wunderhorse were awarded Best Group at the Rolling Stone UK Awards in November 2025.

== History ==
Jacob Slater left home at age 17 and lived in London for five years. He was previously the frontman of punk trio Dead Pretties before the group's disbandment in 2017. After the Dead Pretties broke up, Slater moved to Newquay, Cornwall, where he found odd jobs as a labourer and worked as a surfing instructor while continuing to write music. During this time Slater also landed an acting role, playing drummer Paul Cook in Pistol, a six-part miniseries about the Sex Pistols directed by Danny Boyle.

Slater began Wunderhorse as a solo project during the COVID-19 pandemic. Asked about the band's name, Slater told Hero: "There's this old TV show from the 50s or 60s called Champion the Wonder Horse... I started using the name as a joke and it was one of those things that stuck". He later joined with drummer Jamie Staples, guitarist Harry Fowler (who is also the son of pop singer Kim Wilde), and bassist Peter Woodin to form the current band. Guitarist Oscar Browne recorded with the band but later left the group.

Wunderhorse's debut album Cub was released 7 October 2022 by Communion Music, It was written solely by Slater and produced by Kevin Jones and Peter Woodin.

Cub was named one of the best albums of 2022 by NME, Riot, and Far Out. Critics described the album as "a warming blues/garage/indie fire... an album best enjoyed in its entirety and at high volume", "some of the most well-crafted and interesting rock songs of this decade", "a brilliant catalogue of teenage life - ill-fated love, drugs, self-destruction, depression as well as youthful joy - all to a rousing soundtrack that harks back to the 1990s", and "melodic reflection from a man growing into himself".

In 2022, Wunderhorse toured as a supporting act for other bands, opening for Irish post-punk band Fontaines D.C., Pixies, Foals, and fellow UK singer-songwriters Sam Fender and Declan McKenna. In spring 2023, Wunderhorse toured the United States, with concert dates in several cities and played at Glastonbury Festival 2023 during the summer.

Wunderhorse released their second album, Midas, on 30 August 2024. It was produced by former Rolling Stones producer Craig Silvey and was preceded by the release of five singles: the title track "Midas", "Silver", "July", "Rain", and "Arizona". The album received critical acclaim from multiple publications, and charted at number 6 the following week on the UK Albums Chart.

In May 2025, bassist Pete Woodin left Wunderhorse and was replaced by Sun King singer Seb Byford, son of Saxon lead vocalist Biff Byford. The single "The Rope" was released on 2 June 2025, reaching Number 1 in the UK Official Singles Sales chart, Physical Singles chart, and Vinyl releases chart. Following the release of “The Rope” the band made major UK festival appearances at Glastonbury and Reading & Leeds Festivals and a successful appearance on Later..with Jools Holland.

In July 2026, the band undertook a short North American tour including dates in New York, Los Angeles & Washington D.C. They will play several major UK & Ireland concerts such as London’s All Points East with Twenty One Pilots and headline shows in Belfast, Cork and Sheffield.

== Influences and legacy ==
Wunderhorse have cited influences including Nirvana, PJ Harvey, the Pixies, Beatles, the Rolling Stones, Pearl Jam, the Replacements, Meat Puppets, Paul Kossoff, Fontaines D.C., Jimi Hendrix, Nick Drake, Slick Rick, Organized Konfusion, Big Thief, Adrianne Lenker, Townes Van Zandt, Miles Davis, Bob Dylan, Chet Baker, Van Morrison, the Stooges, Sorry, Wu-Lu, Happy Mondays, the Stone Roses, the Smiths, Joy Division, Leonard Cohen, Sun Kil Moon, Neil Young, Joni Mitchell, Elliott Smith and Morphine. Drummer Jamie Staples has cited his drum inspirations as John Bonham in Led Zeppelin and Dave Grohl in Nirvana.

Around 2024, a grunge revival scene took shape in the United Kingdom and Ireland, under the influence of Wunderhorse. Its most prominent acts were Bleech 9:3, Keo and Tooth. In a 2026 interview with Dazed, Adam Conway, vocalist of Keo, called the scene the "Wundersphere". The article's writer Rishi Shah noted it as, in part, a reaction against the dominance of the "indie poo" scene in Britain. Wunderhorse have been cited as an influence by Bleech 9:3 and Keo.

== Discography ==
Albums
Title	Date of Release	Label
Cub	October 7, 2022	Communion Music
Midas	August 30, 2024	Communion Music
