= Mouth of the Tyne Festival =

- Genre: Street Festival
- Date: July
- Frequency: Annual
- Locations: Tynemouth, Tyne and Wear, England
- Organiser: North Tyneside Council
- Website: http://mouthofthetynefestival.com

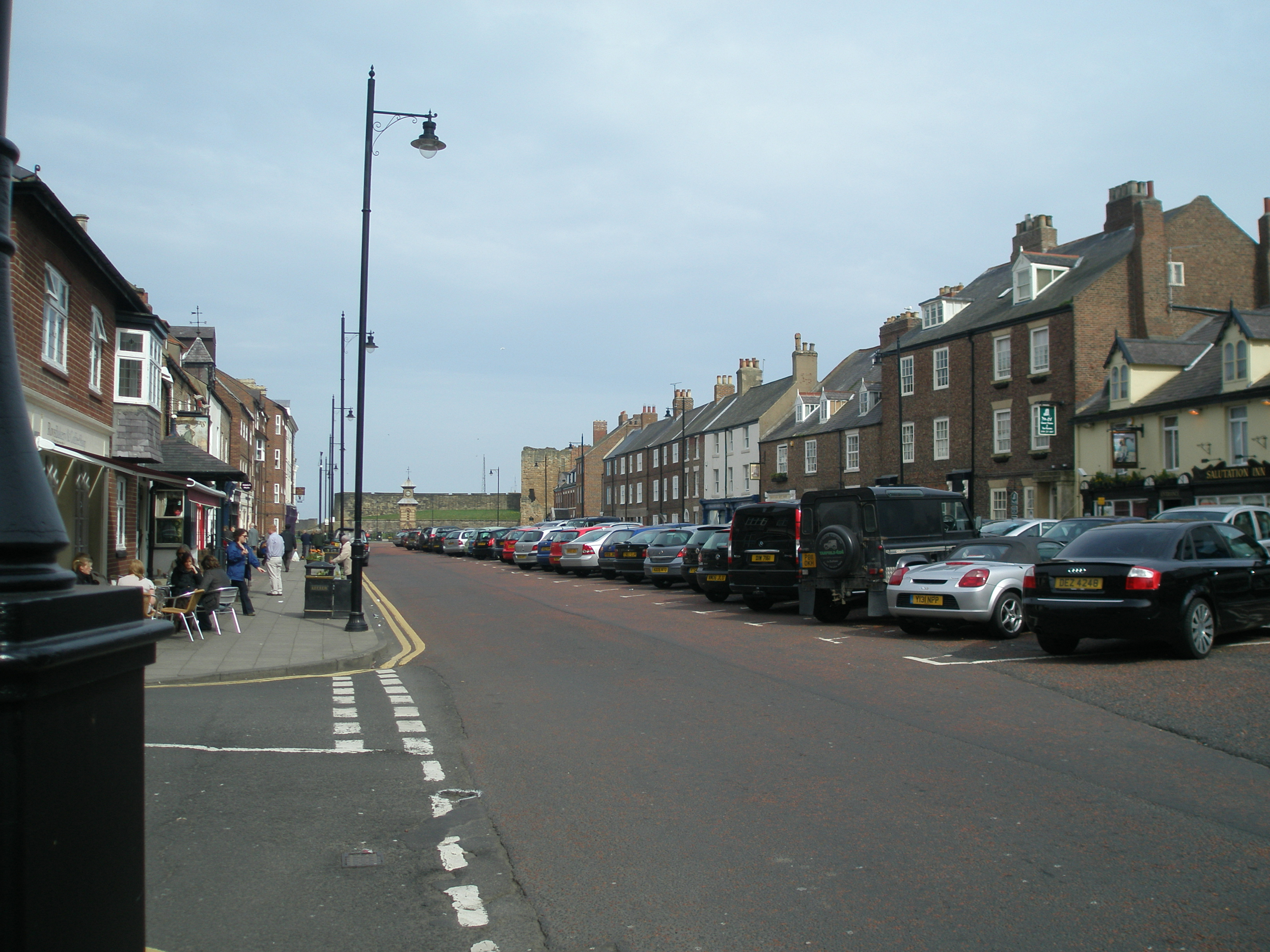
Tynemouth Front Street

Founded in 2005, the Mouth of the Tyne Festival is an annual weekend in July of live music and street theatre in the village of Tynemouth. It originally took place on both sides of the Tyne, before moving to Tynemouth. It consists of outdoor music concerts at Tynemouth Priory and Castle, performances and a pageant, with other activities at Tynemouth Station and the Playhouse Whitley Bay.

It is organised by North Tyneside Council.

== Notable acts ==
=== 2014 ===
- Nadine Shah
- Midlake
- John Cooper Clark
- Lawson
- Paul Weller

=== 2015 ===
- Paul Heaton & Jacqui Abbott
- Jack Savoretti
- The Specials
- Martha Reeves & The Vandellas

=== 2016 ===
- Bryan Ferry
- Nadine Shah
- Will Young
- Tunde Baiyewu
- James Bay
- Tom Smith
- Lulu
- Lemar

=== 2017 ===
- Laura Marling
- Elbow
- Tom Odell
- Billy Ocean

=== 2018 ===
- Paloma Faith
- James Arthur
- Gabrielle Aplin
- Paul Heaton & Jacqui Abbott
- Beverley Knight
- Collabro

=== 2019 ===
- Sam Fender
- Little Comets
- Rachel Chinouriri
- Jack Savoretti
- Rick Astley
- The Proclaimers
- Jack Lukeman
- Robert Vincent
- Nadine Shah
- Ruby Turner

=== 2023 ===
- Siouxsie
- Gabrielle
