= Sam Fender =

English singer-songwriter (born 1994)

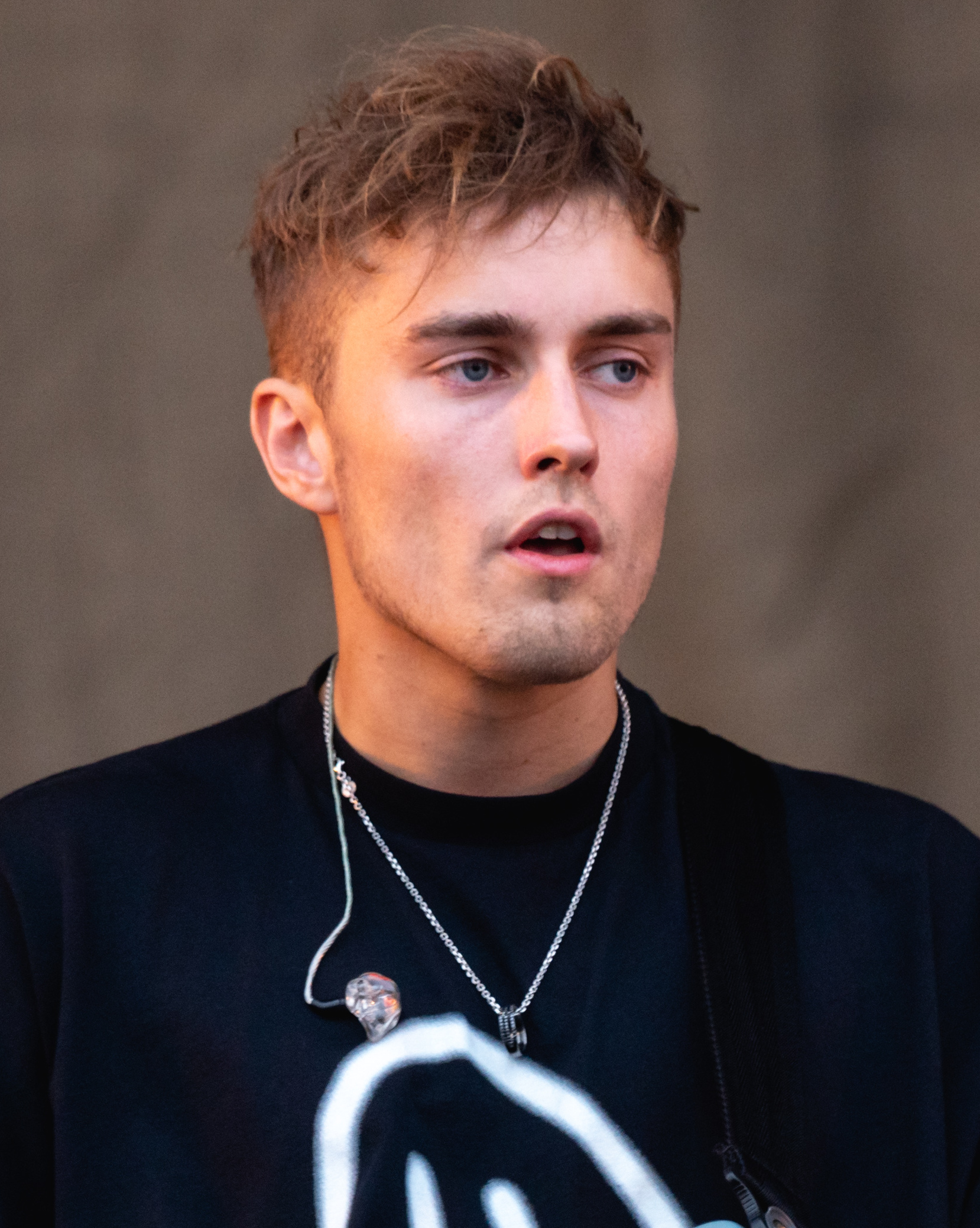
- Fender performing at Boardmasters, 2021
- Born: Samuel Thomas Fender; 25 April 1994 (age 32); North Shields, Tyne and Wear, England
- Occupations: Singer; songwriter; musician; model
- Years active: 2013–present
- Works: Discography
- Awards: Full list
- Musical career
- Genres: Rock; indie rock; pop rock; heartland rock
- Instruments: Vocals; guitar; piano
- Labels: Polydor; Interscope; Capitol
- Website: samfender.com

Samuel Thomas Fender (born 25 April 1994) is an English singer, songwriter, and musician. Born and raised in North Shields, Fender released several singles independently beginning in 2017. His sonic identity relies primarily on his traditional American musical upbringing, combined with a British rock sensibility. He is known for his high tenor voice and Geordie accent. Highly acclaimed for his songwriting style, Fender is the recipient of five Brit Awards, two Ivor Novello Awards and a Mercury Prize.

Fender first gained recognition after he was named on the BBC Sound of 2018 shortlist, before signing to Polydor Records, who released his debut EP Dead Boys. He subsequently won the Critics' Choice Award at the 2019 Brit Awards and released his debut album Hypersonic Missiles that same year, entering the UK Albums Chart at number one. His second album, Seventeen Going Under, was released in 2021 and also debuted at the summit of the UK Albums Chart, with its title track gaining immense critical and commercial success. Fender subsequently gained Mercury Prize and Brit Award nominations.

In 2022, 2025, and 2026, Fender won the Brit Award for British Rock/Alternative Act, becoming the most awarded performer in that category's history. His third studio album, People Watching, was released in February 2025 and received that year's Mercury Prize; it also debuted atop the UK Albums Chart, his third album to do so. The album's sixth single, "Rein Me In", a duet with English soul singer-songwriter Olivia Dean, became Fender's first UK number one single, received the 2026 Brit Award for Song of the Year, and is currently the longest running chart-topping single in British history, lasting an unprecedented 23 overall weeks at number one.

== Early life ==
Samuel Thomas Fender was born on 25 April 1994, in North Shields, England, to Shirley and Alan Fender. Shirley was a nurse, and Alan was an electrician, later becoming a music teacher. Fender has a brother, Liam, nine years his senior. Alan is also a singer-songwriter, guitarist, and pianist, whilst Liam plays the drums; both were musicians performing locally. A working class family, they lived in a terraced house in North Shields. Fender's great-great-grandmother was Irish.

Fender has described the first 10 years of his life as "comfortable" within a musical family. However, he had a tumultuous late childhood and adolescence. His mother left when he was eight years old, although he later reconnected with her when he, at age 17, was forced out of his father's house by his stepmother. Fender's mother was, at that time, living in the Scottish Borders; he partly grew up there through visiting her. Fender has spoken of his appreciation for Scotland, describing it as his "second home".

At age eight, Fender received his first guitar from his father. Fascinated by Jimmy Page, Jimi Hendrix and Slash, he became "proficient" on the guitar at age 10. Fender attended John Spence Community High School in Preston, Tyne and Wear. He was bullied for being overweight and unathletic as a child. When he was a teenager, he and his mother discovered the body of a woman they knew who died by suicide, which affected his formative years.

When Fender was 12, he met his friend Dean Thompson and continued to play the guitar alongside him. Over the following year, he performed for the first time in front of an audience at his brother's street performer nights, playing Hendrix covers, and accompanied by Thompson at the latter's uncle's birthday, covering songs by Kings of Leon. His ambition at this point was to become a professional musician; Fender recalled, "when I hit 13 it was the only thing I wanted from life." At age 14, Fender began writing songs. The same year, he learned to sing by listening to Jeff Buckley's Grace, an album his brother gave him. Fender's brother introduced him to Bruce Springsteen's Born to Run and Darkness on the Edge of Town albums at age 15, during which he also began playing at his brother's open mic nights and formed his first band. At the time, he and his mother were poor and living in a small, crumbling flat within a council estate on the outskirts of North Shields.

Fender attended sixth form at Whitley Bay High School. He found musically-minded friends at high school. He met Joe Atkinson, and they developed a friendship through their musical interests. Fender studied theatre and A Level in English language and literature at Whitley Bay High School; during this time, he began to spend most of his time in the music department, although he had not studied the subject academically. Fender performed with his band for the Year 13 students finishing their time. At age 16, Fender entered a Teenage Cancer Trust competition and won.

The environment Fender grew up in was "ravaged" by the omnipresence of drugs, especially spice. His friends were dealing marijuana, and later some switched to hard drugs such as cocaine. Social pressure had prompted him to smoke spice several times, but he stopped after finding the experience unsettling, while his friends became addicted for years, which Fender said "destroyed their lives". When he was 17, his mother had to end her 40-year career as a nurse due to fibromyalgia; he considered selling drugs to support her, but she talked him out of it. Fender idolised his father for his talent as a musician, and viewed him as a tough man who struggled to provide for his children in a region facing an endemic lack of opportunities.

Fender said he needed to become independent quickly. Whilst studying, Fender simultaneously held two jobs, working in a local restaurant and pub, and drank alcohol daily from 17 and a half to 18, to relieve the fatigue. He abandoned his A Levels to earn money to help his mother, who developed a mental illness in addition to her fibromyalgia. At the time, both had slipped below the poverty line. His father was then a guitarist playing in clubs around Newcastle upon Tyne, and their relationship improved due to their shared passion for music. Around 18 years old, Fender began performing paid gigs at restaurants. After high school, he held several jobs, teaching guitar and working in a call centre and a bar.

== Career ==
=== 2013–2018: Beginnings ===
At 18, Fender was spotted performing in Low Lights Tavern, the pub where he worked, by Ben Howard's manager, Owain Davies, who took him on as a client. Throughout 2013, he played a series of gigs across England supporting other artists, including Howard and Willy Mason. Fender was diagnosed with a potentially life-threatening illness when he was 20, shortly after which his father moved to France. He took two years out for health reasons. He revealed years later that he has a "compromised immune system". Fender has said that prior to this time he tried to write songs that he thought would be popular as he was "desperate to do well" to get himself and his mother out of their financial and living situation. However, Fender said that having a major health scare and facing the possibility of death changed his outlook on life. His recovery refocused his songwriting efforts, and he began writing songs for himself. It was out of this period that Fender wrote a number of the songs he went on to release.

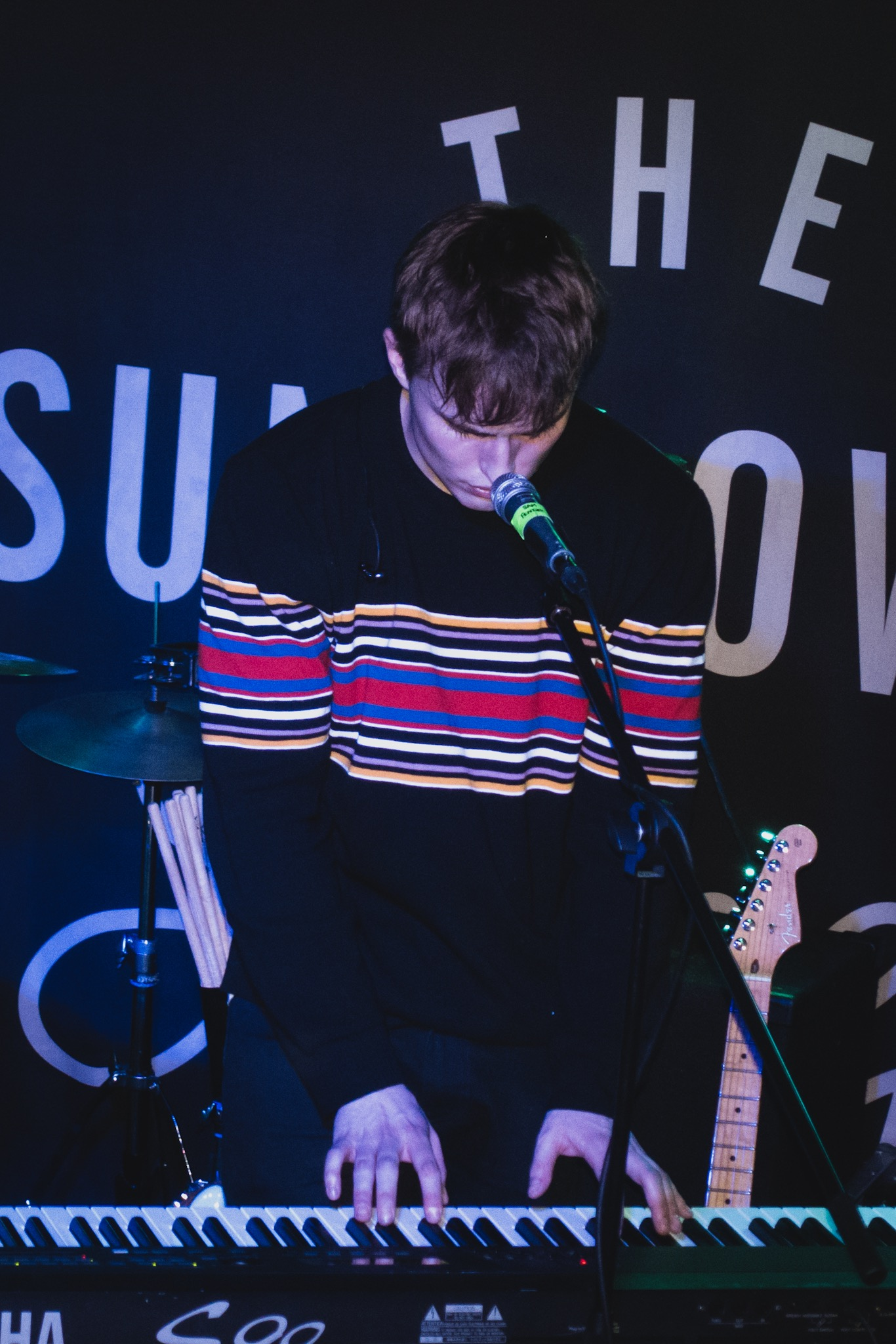
Fender performing in Birmingham in March 2018

In March 2017, Fender independently released his debut single, "Play God", which premiered on BBC Radio 1. In the summer of 2017, Fender played the first shows with his band, consisting of guitarist Thompson, guitarist and keyboardist Atkinson, bassist Tom Ungerer, and drummer Drew Micheal. Throughout this period Fender toured with support slots for acts such as Bear's Den, Declan McKenna, and Michael Kiwanuka. In 2017, he put out singles "Friday Fighting" and "Start Again", which sparked a first breakthrough. In November 2017, Fender was placed on BBC's Sound of 2018 shortlist, Won by Sigrid, the list was compiled by votes from 173 critics, festival bookers, and DJs. On 2 December 2017, he played a BBC Music Introducing session at Maida Vale Studios.

In June 2018, he signed with Polydor Records. The single "Dead Boys" was premiered as Annie Mac's Hottest Record in the World in October. The song deals with the subject of male suicide, and Fender wrote it as a reaction to losing close friends to suicide. In October 2018, Fender performed "Dead Boys" alongside "Leave Fast" on BBC's Later... with Jools Holland. "Dead Boys" was considered Fender's first breakthrough song, as it was the first to bring him mainstream attention.

The single "That Sound" was released on 22 October 2018. His debut EP, Dead Boys, followed the next month, on 20 November 2018. The EP also featured the songs "Spice" and "Poundshop Kardashians". Alongside the EP's release, he embarked on a headline tour, including three shows at the London's Omeara club and one at Newcastle University, and toured with Blossoms in December. He also went on a 13-date European and Australian tour. In December 2018, Fender was selected by Vevo to be a part of its Dscvr 2019 Artists to Watch series, and he was included in The Irish News' list of "Who are the ones to watch in music in 2019?".

=== 2019–2020: Hypersonic Missiles ===
In January 2019, the final band line-up was completed by saxophonist Johnny "Blue Hat" Davis, who had worked with The Who's Roger Daltrey and The Blues Brothers' Lou Marini. In anticipation of his debut album, Fender re-released "Play God" on 14 January 2019. The following month, Fender won the Critics' Choice Award at the 2019 Brit Awards. On 26 February, he performed "Play God" in his first Live Lounge alongside a cover of Ariana Grande's "Break Up with Your Girlfriend, I'm Bored". On 6 March, Fender released a single, "Hypersonic Missiles", the forthcoming album's title track, which he described as an "unorthodox love song". In March, he performed the song on his US television debut on Jimmy Kimmel Live! He embarked on his first North American tour in March, including shows in New York City and Los Angeles and at the South by Southwest festival in Texas.

In May, Fender performed at BBC Radio 1's Big Weekend in Middlesbrough. In early July, he announced the album alongside the release of the single "Will We Talk?". After extensive touring, including two shows at Shepherd's Bush Empire, Fender had to cancel several gigs, including Glastonbury Festival, after experiencing severe bleeding in his vocal cords. Nevertheless, after a month of rest, he recovered sufficiently to support Bob Dylan and Neil Young in Hyde Park and set a record for the fastest-selling show at the Mouth of the Tyne Festival, where he was the headliner. After Fender's performance of "Will We Talk?" on The Tonight Show Starring Jimmy Fallon in August 2019, Claire Shaffer of Rolling Stone wrote: "Fender is notably one of the few true singer-songwriters who's climbing the modern-day pop charts". After that, he performed at the Lollapalooza festival in Chicago and the Summer Sonic Festival in Osaka and Tokyo. The last single, "The Borders" was released two weeks prior to the album.

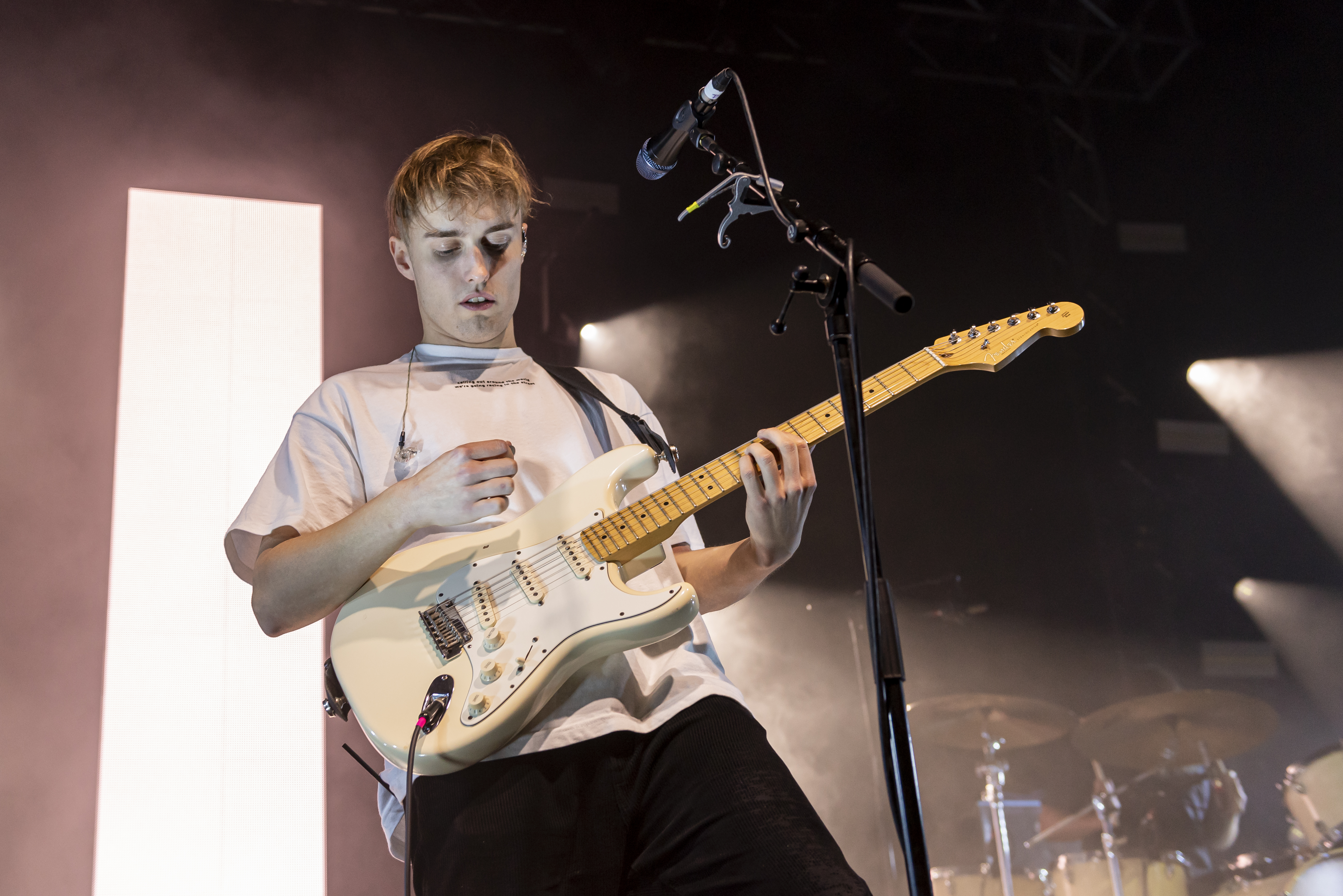
Fender and Drew Michael (right) performing at the O2 Academy Leeds, November 2019

Fender released his debut studio album, Hypersonic Missiles, on 13 September 2019. It topped the UK Albums Chart, outselling the rest of the top 5 combined at the mid-week mark, and sold 41,000 copies in its first week of release. The album debuted and peaked at number twelve on the Billboard Heatseekers Albums chart. On 21 September, Fender supported Liam Gallagher for a Radio X performance at the O2 Ritz in Manchester. He received the Official Charts Number 1 Award for the BBC's Match of the Day. Subsequently, he returned for a second North American tour spanning from 25 September to 20 October. On 21 October 2019, Fender appeared as the musical guest on Late Night with Seth Meyers. On 22 November, he began a headlining tour of 20 dates in the UK and Ireland, including two nights at the O2 Brixton Academy and four nights at the O2 Academy Newcastle. Fender set the record for the fastest sell-out of four nights at Newcastle's O2 Academy. On 10 December 2019, "All Is on My Side" was released being described as one of his oldest songs and a staple of his live set, which didn't make it on the album. Hypersonic Missiles was certified Gold by the British Phonographic Industry (BPI) for selling over 100,000 units in the UK, three months after the album release, on 13 December 2019. It was the "fastest-selling" and the eleventh best-selling vinyl album of 2019 in the UK.

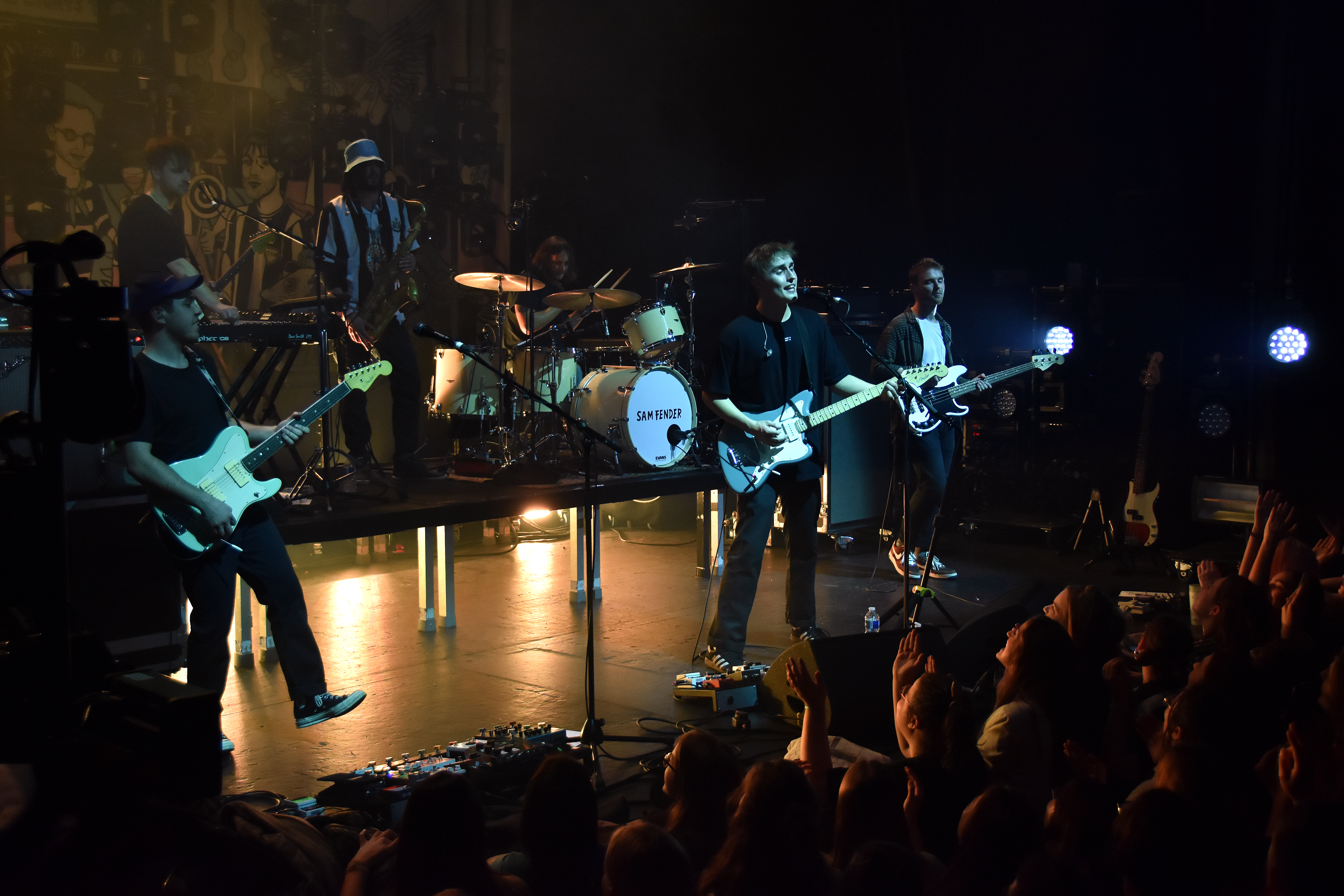
The band performing in Paris, 2020 (left to right) Dean Thompson, Joe Atkinson, Johnny "Blue Hat" Davis, Michael, Fender, and Tom Ungerer

Elton John personally invited Fender to perform at his annual AIDS Foundation Academy Awards Party after the 92nd Academy Awards in 2020. On 13 February 2020, the single "Hold Out" was released, which Fender said was to be the last release from the Hypersonic Missiles era. He wrote the song when he was 20. Fender was nominated for Best New Artist at the 2020 Brit Awards, won by Lewis Capaldi. In February 2020, he undertook a headlining tour across Europe to promote the album. Fender performed in the Live Lounge playing a cover of "Back To Black" by Amy Winehouse, which was later officially released. He was supposed to embark on a UK-headline tour in spring 2020, including performances at Leeds Arena, Utilita Arena Newcastle, and Cardiff International Arena, which would have marked his first-ever headlining arena shows. However, in March, Fender was forced to reschedule the tour due to the COVID-19 pandemic.

In August 2020, Fender was the first act to perform at the world's first socially distanced venue, at the Gosforth Park-based Virgin Money Unity Arena, in Newcastle. Opening the show with "Will We Talk?", he played three unreleased songs, including "The Kitchen" and "Seventeen Going Under". "Dead Boys" was nominated for the Ivor Novello Award for Best Song Musically and Lyrically. On 24 November 2020, Fender released the single "Winter Song", a cover of a 1970s track by Lindisfarne, which was premiered as Annie Mac's Hottest Record in the World. He performed the song with the Royal Northern Sinfonia at the Sage Gateshead Christmas Cracker event on 18 December.

=== 2021–2023: Seventeen Going Under ===
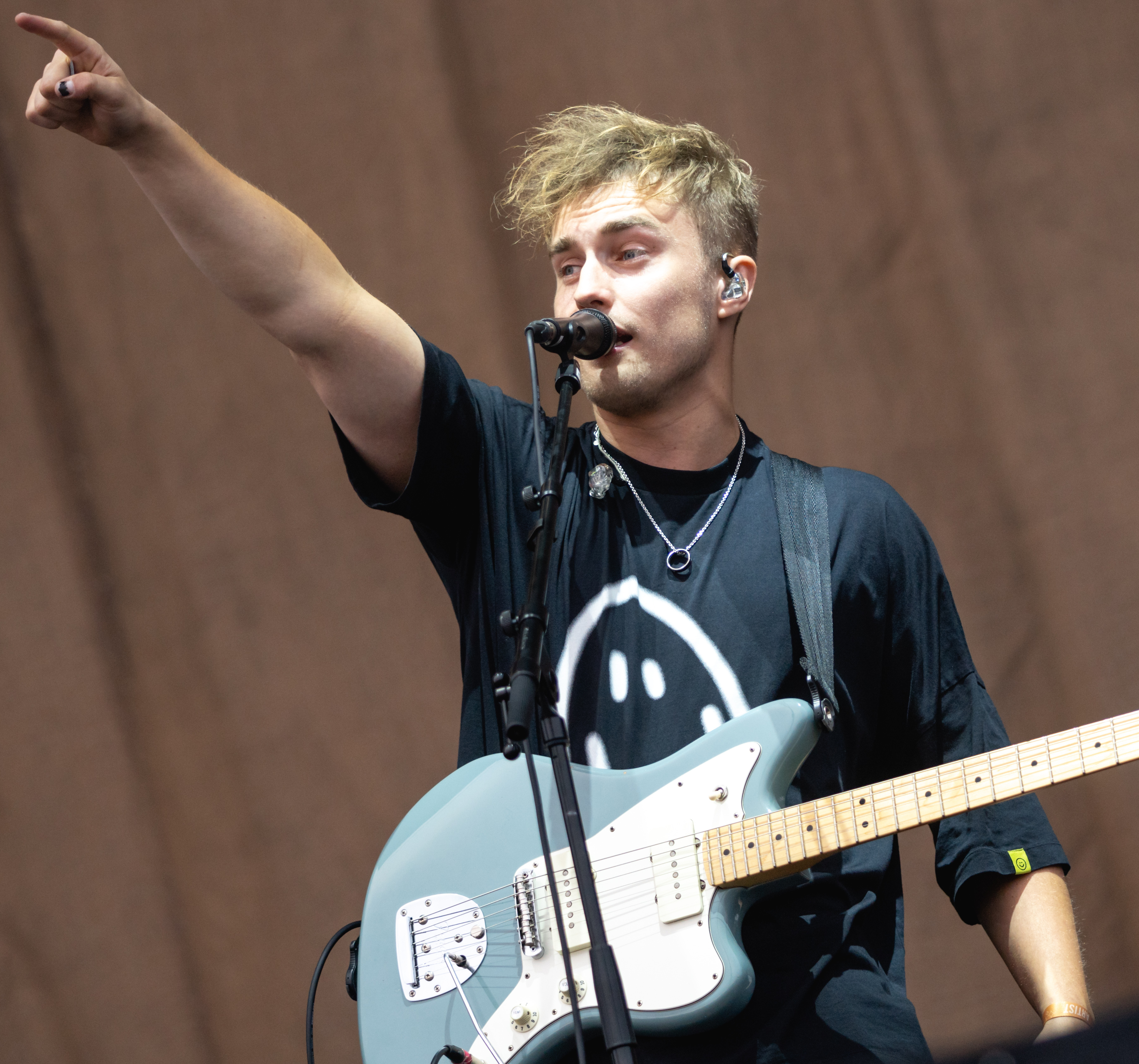
Fender in 2021.

On 7 July 2021, Fender released "Seventeen Going Under" as the lead single and title track of his second studio album. The song focuses on Fender at age 17 and his struggle to help his mother financially. Alongside this, Fender announced the album's track list and described it as "a coming of age story", "growing up", "a celebration of life after hardship, and ... surviving". The single debuted at number 44 on the UK Singles Chart. Fender followed the title track's release with the politically charged single "Aye", which he described as being "about the polarity between the left and the right wing". Fender embarked on a 13-date headline UK tour, which was initially scheduled for March and April 2020 but postponed due to the pandemic. On 8 September, he released the single "Get You Down". The single "Spit Of You", released on 27 September, chronicles Fender's relationship with his father, played by actor Stephen Graham in the music video directed by Philip Barantini. "Get You Down" was later featured on the FIFA 22 video game soundtrack.

Produced by Bramwell Bronte, Seventeen Going Under was released on 8 October 2021 through Polydor Records. The album debuted at number one on the UK Albums Chart, marking Fender's second time to debut at the top spot. Seventeen Going Under shifted 44,000 copies in its first week of release, 79% of which were physical sales, outselling the rest of the top 10 albums combined. The album marked Fender's highest first-week sales to date and the fifth-biggest opening week of 2021. It also topped the Official Vinyl Albums Chart, and was the best-seller album in its first week in the UK's independent record shops. It debuted at number one on the Scottish Albums Chart. Fender said that "as a record, I think this one is leagues ahead of Hypersonic Missiles, I'm more proud of this than anything I've ever done. It's probably the best thing I've done in my life." It received "universal acclaim", based on the cumulative reviews on the website Metacritic. Grant Moon of Guitar World called it "a masterclass in songwriting".

Fender presented a documentary on the life of Alan Hull, named Lindisfarne's Geordie Genius: The Alan Hull Story, which featured contributions from Sting, Elvis Costello, Mark Knopfler, Dave Stewart, and Peter Gabriel. It was broadcast by BBC Four on 26 November 2021. In December 2021, The New York Times wrote that Fender "is fast becoming one of Britain's biggest rock acts". Seventeen Going Under was the eleventh best-selling vinyl album of 2021 in the UK.

"Seventeen Going Under" peaked at number three on the UK Singles Chart in the week ending 13 January 2022, after 25 weeks on the chart. Fender received the Brit Award for British Rock/Alternative Act the following month at the 2022 Brit Awards. He dedicated the win (in part) to the North East Homeless centre. Fender embarked on a UK-headline arena tour to support Seventeen Going Under, which began on 20 March and included shows at Wembley Arena, OVO Hydro Arena, and also 3Arena in Dublin, Ireland. On 19 May, "Seventeen Going Under" earned Fender an Ivor Novello Award in the category of Best Song Musically and Lyrically. He supported The Killers on 5 and 6 June at Emirates Stadium. On 24 June, Fender performed on the Pyramid Stage at Glastonbury Festival 2022. He appeared as a special guest for The Rolling Stones at British Summer Time Hyde Park on 3 July 2022. Fender headlined a show to 45,000 people at Finsbury Park on 15 July 2022. It marked his largest headline show at this point.

On 2 September 2022, Fender announced his first headline stadium show for 2023. On 18 October, Fender secured his first Mercury Prize nomination with Seventeen Going Under. He unveiled "Wild Grey Ocean", a song previously unreleased from Seventeen Going Under, which would later be included in the album's reissue. In November 2022, the single "Seventeen Going Under" was certified double platinum by the BPI (1.2 million UK sales). Fender opened for Springsteen at two shows in Italy in May 2023. Fender headlined two shows on 9 and 10 June 2023 at Newcastle's St James' Park stadium, attended by 100,000 people in total. Both shows injected £15 million into the local economy.

=== 2024–present: People Watching ===
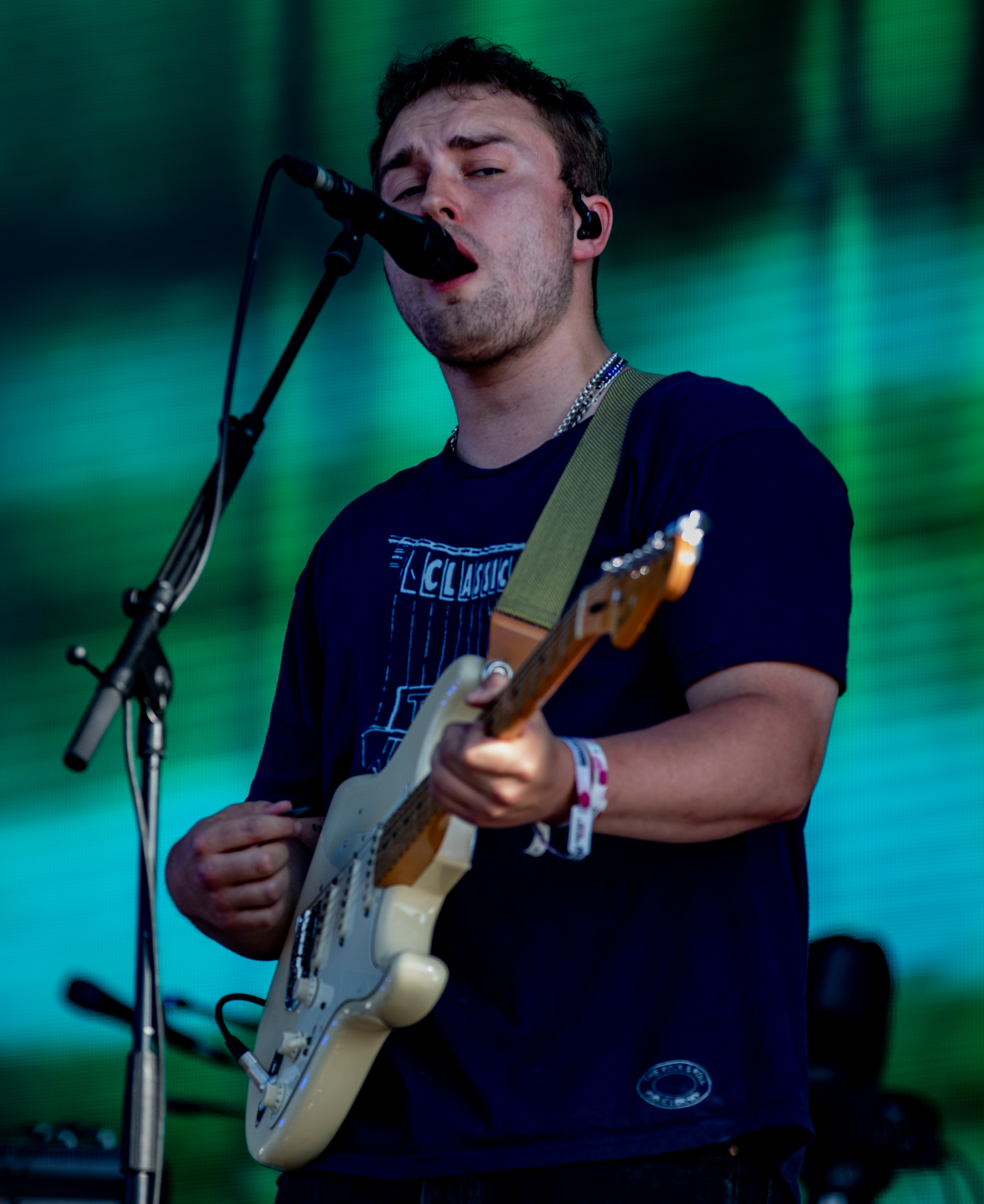
Fender performing at the Southside Festival in June 2025 as part of the People Watching Tour.

On 19 January 2024, Fender was featured on the song "Homesick" from Noah Kahan's album Stick Season. Fender played two unreleased songs, "People Watching" and "Nostalgia’s Lie", at an intimate show in Plymouth on 3 August 2024. The performance, which served as a warm-up for his upcoming Boardmasters headline set, marked the live debut of the tracks, both of which appeared on his third studio album, People Watching. In November 2024, Fender began teasing the release of "People Watching", sharing details about the single on social media. He revealed that the song was inspired by the death of someone who was like a "surrogate mother" to him. The single was released on 15 November 2024. He released a further single, "Wild Long Lie", on 2 December 2024, followed by "Arm's Length" on 24 January 2025. "Remember My Name", featuring Easington Colliery Band, was released on 14 February 2025 with an accompanying music video starring Dave Johns. In October the album won the 2025 Mercury Prize.

His third studio album People Watching, was released on 21 February 2025, to generally strong reviews. The album became his third to chart at number 1 on the UK Albums chart, with 107,100 units sold in the opening week, the biggest for a British artist since Harry Styles's 2022 album Harry's House. Nick Reilly of Rolling Stone gave the album four stars, stating that it proved why Fender is a "master storyteller". In another review, Brianna Corinne of Atwood Magazine opined that the album was a "brilliant ode to the North East" and an "instant classic". However, Pitchfork's Hannah Jocelyn gave the album a rating of 6.5, saying that Fender sometimes gets "lost in the wall of sound". He performed the lead single "People Watching", at the Brit Awards 2025, where he took home his second Brit Award for British Rock/Alternative Act.

On 18 October 2024, Fender announced his People Watching Tour, with dates across the UK and Europe. The tour kicked off in December 2024 in Ireland, followed by UK shows. Fender also performed across Europe in March 2025. Fender performed on Coachella's Mojave Stage in April 2025, with Adam Granduciel of The War on Drugs joining him as a special guest during the festival's second weekend. He also headlined BBC Radio 1's Big Weekend in May 2025.

In June 2025, Fender collaborated with English singer Olivia Dean on a new version of his track "Rein Me In". The song was performed live for the first time on June 6 at Fender's sold-out show at London Stadium, with Dean as a supporting act, and was also performed the following week at St. James' Park in Newcastle. Fender later released "Talk to You" on October 17, a collaboration with English musician and songwriter Elton John. Both singles were included on the deluxe edition of the album People Watching, released on 5 December 2025.

In November 2025, Fender released a concert film for the People Watching Tour in partnership with YouTube. The performance was recorded on 6 June at London Stadium.

In February 2026, "Rein Me In", Fender's duet with Olivia Dean, became his first UK number one single. It reached the position after 35 consecutive weeks in the UK Top 40; the longest single to do so. As of July 2026, the song had spent 23 weeks at number one on the chart, becoming the longest running number one by a British act, breaking a 32-year-long record previously held by Wet Wet Wet's "Love Is All Around", and also becoming the longest running number-one single of all time, surpassing the 73-year long record of 18 non-consecutive weeks set by Frankie Laine's "I Believe" in 1953. The duet won the award for Song of the Year at the Brit Awards 2026.

In May 2026, Fender received the Ivor Novello Award for Songwriter of the Year. In August, Fender appeared as a special guest in Olivia Dean's set at Lollapalooza in Chicago, where they performed "Rein Me In". In October, Fender began teasing a stadium tour for 2027, with a countdown on his official website going live on 20 October 2026. At the end of the countdown, Fender announced the Proper Massive Stadium Tour and the pre-order of his fourth studio album, both scheduled for 2027. Fender also announced his 2027 North American tour a few days later. In November 2026, Fender released a cover of the Rolling Stones' "You Can't Always Get What You Want" for the John Lewis Christmas advert. In November, it was announced that Fender would headline the Glastonbury Festival 2027 for the first time.

== Other endeavours ==
=== Acting ===
Fender made his acting debut in the pilot episode of the ITV drama series Vera, which aired in 2011. He also appeared in an episode of the fantasy series Wolfblood, which first aired on CBBC in 2012. About his brief acting career, Fender stated he favoured music due to the ability to have "more control over it". In 2021, he expressed interest in the possibility of pursuing acting roles in the future. Grace Almond of Rolling Stone wrote that the music videos of "Spit Of You" and "Get You Down", where he was the lead character, highlighted Fender's acting abilities.

=== Modelling ===
In 2018, Fender first appeared in UK fashion magazines such as F Word and The Last Magazine. In April 2019, he was chosen as a model to front the "Suit Your Self" tailoring campaign for Topman. In 2019, he was featured in a GQ magazine article. Fender made an appearance at the British GQ Men of the Year Awards 2019 at Tate Modern in London. In September 2020, he was hired as the "face" of an eighteen-month motorcycle-inspired clothing campaign for British brand Barbour International and retailer Scotts Menswear. In 2021, Fender created his signature clothing line in partnership with Barbour International and launched it in April of that year via Scotts Menswear. The promotion was accompanied by a short film called On the Record, which included an interview conducted at Newcastle's Vinyl Guruh record store. As part of his modelling work, Fender has promoted branded apparel such as, Acne Studios, Frame, Harrington jacket, Martine Rose, Nike, Rag & Bone, Reiss, Champion, Levi's, Umbro, Urban Outfitters, Converse, Dr. Martens, and Dunhill.

=== Philanthropy ===
On 1 April 2020, Fender performed for Isolation Nation Live on LADbible's Facebook page with an optional donation benefiting the British Red Cross's COVID-19 relief efforts. He participated in the Live Lounge Allstars charity single as part of a charity supergroup that recorded a rendition of "Times Like These" by Foo Fighters from their homes during the COVID-19 lockdowns, whose proceeds were donated to charities Children in Need, Comic Relief, and COVID-19 Solidarity Response Fund. The single premiered on 23 April 2020 alongside a music video. Fender released a cover of "Winter Song" by Alan Hull to raise money for The Big Issue newspaper, collaborating with the social enterprise People of the Streets. He said the issue of homelessness is significant to him as he has friends and relatives who have experienced it.

On 4 December 2020, Fender launched a petition to urge all UK councils to stop phone charges for helplines for vulnerable groups of people in the North East of England in need of emergency assistance. Fender said it was "scandalous" that four of the seven councils serving its local community charged them 40 pence per minute. The petition was part of a campaign established jointly with the North East Homeless centre. By 21 December 2020, the petition reached 16,500 signatures, and as a result, six councils, including Durham, Gateshead, Newcastle City, North Tyneside, Northumberland and South Tyneside, decided to drop phone charges for their helplines in favour of free-to-call numbers.

He contributed a cover of Metallica's "Sad but True" for the charity tribute album The Metallica Blacklist, released in September 2021. Half of the proceeds went to Metallica's All Within My Hands Foundation, the other half to the Teenage Cancer Trust, chosen by Fender. On 19 December 2021, he went to help out at the Newcastle West End Foodbank after being invited by The Big Issue. In March 2022, Rega Research released a limited edition turntable signed by Fender as part of the Record Store Day event, whose sale proceeds have been donated to War Child UK, which raised funds to help children in plight amid the Russian invasion of Ukraine. In the same month, Fender became the patron of the North East Homeless charity. On 24 May 2022, Fender performed at Newcastle City Hall to raise money for the North East Homeless centre through a ballot ticketing system. The event raised £133,725, thus enabling the centre building renovation.

When announcing his People Watching Tour, Fender revealed that £1 from every ticket sold for the UK dates would be donated to Music Venue Trust, in support of grassroots venues. The initiative raised over £100,000 which helped support 38 grassroots music venues across the UK. According to the Music Venue Trust, the funds provided urgent emergency assistance to 19 venues facing potential closure and over £50,000 in improvement grants to another 19 venues, enabling essential upgrades to facilities, equipment and infrastructure. Later, in 2025, following his Mercury Prize win for People Watching, Fender donated his entire £25,000 prize to the Music Venue Trust. The singer credited independent venues for shaping his early career, saying: “I wouldn’t be doing what I am doing today if it wasn’t for all the gigs I played around the North East, and beyond, when I was starting out. These venues are legendary, but they are struggling.”

On 19 April 2026, it was announced that Fender had donated £25,000 from his People Watching Tour to AutismAble, a South Shields-based community interest company serving people with autism and learning difficulties. Through a partnership with the charity Youth Music, the donation was matched, providing a total of £50,000 to the organization’s "Future Collaborations" music outreach programme.

When releasing the cover of "You Can't Always Get What You Want" for John Lewis' Christmas advert, Fender announced that he would donate 100% of the net profits from CD and vinyl sales of the single to the Teenage Cancer Trust.

== Personal life ==
Fender has attention deficit hyperactivity disorder, which he believes helped him focus on music. His immune system issues affected his touring. The Bristol and Birmingham shows scheduled for 5 and 6 December 2019 were postponed to January 2020 due to a "respiratory tract infection". Despite this, both shows were cancelled again in January 2020, as Fender accumulated chest infections, laryngitis, and tonsillitis. He supported the use of medical marijuana, which helped alleviate a friend's cancer symptoms.

On 12 September 2022, Fender announced he was cancelling the remaining dates of his US tour to focus on his mental health. He stated, "I've neglected myself for over a year now and haven't dealt with things that have deeply affected me."

In 2022, Fender entered the Sunday Times Rich List for the first time, ranking him 12th on the list of Young music millionaires in the UK, with wealth valued at £10 million (US$11.9 million).

Fender lives in north London.

In a 2025 interview with the Los Angeles Times, when asked whether dating had become harder since gaining fame, Fender said it was "a lot easier" because he was "not dating", later commenting, “it’s already out in some of the papers in the UK. I’m seeing somebody, and it’s great”. Media reports had previously suggested that he had been dating London-based actress Rosa Collier since 2022.

=== Political views ===
Fender holds left-wing views, but has said that the British Left had "alienated their grassroots supporters" by concentrating on identity politics, leaving the working class to "being picked up by the right". He felt that "the increasing polarisation of political discourse" is a problem that makes "debate and compromise all but impossible". Fender was also a supporter of Jeremy Corbyn, telling The Big Issue: "I loved Corbyn, quite frankly. I mean, he fucked up a lot of things. But I think his heart was in the right place and that's something that we've not seen for a long time. I just think he was done a massive disservice by the British press. And I think a lot of people who he would have potentially helped, were groomed to hate him."

In July 2020, he signed an open letter to the UK Minister for Women and Equalities, Liz Truss, calling for a ban on all forms of LGBT conversion therapy. In late 2021, Fender felt disillusioned by politicians and political parties, saying that his "only allegiance now is to 'people'". In November 2023, Fender signed an open letter calling for a ceasefire in Gaza. In August 2025, Fender brought out activists including Greta Thunberg at a concert in Denmark to voice support for Palestine.

In an interview with The Sunday Times in 2025, Fender commented that "white boys from nowhere towns" are increasingly drawn to figures like Andrew Tate because they feel "shamed" for privileges they do not recognise. He later clarified that his remarks were misunderstood, explaining that many young men, including his own nephews, encounter such influencers online while seeking role models, and emphasised that masculinity does not need to be drowned in misogyny.

In November 2025, Fender joined several other artists in contributing a silent track to the protest album Is This What We Want?, which calls on the British government not to legalise music theft for the benefit of AI companies.

== Artistry ==
=== Influences ===
Fender grew up in a family where his parents listened to soul, jazz, rock, and 1990s music through his brother. He cites Aretha Franklin, Donny Hathaway, Otis Redding, Joni Mitchell, Jeff Buckley, Adam Granduciel, and his father's favourite band, Steely Dan, as his early inspirations. His godfather was also a significant source of musical inspiration to him growing up; thus, visiting him, Fender would listen to songs by Mitchell and the Smiths. He also listened to 1960s rock and roll, the Spencer Davis Group, the Kinks, Joy Division, and Talking Heads growing up. Fender credited his initial interest and inspiration for songwriting to a teacher who encouraged him to enhance his writing as part of a two-year school work beginning at age 13.

Fender names Bruce Springsteen and his album Born to Run as a major influence. While dismissing comparisons between himself and Springsteen, Fender called Springsteen "a genius" and one of the greatest singer-songwriters of all time." On Fender's originality, The Irish Times' Niall Byrne stated that his work "has retained its own sense of identity and has avoided the pitfalls of regurgitation". Songs from the 1980s, such as "Fast Car" by Tracy Chapman and "Luka" by Suzanne Vega, as well as The Beatles, ABBA, and Kendrick Lamar use a writing style that Fender appreciates.

=== Voice and musical style ===
"Will We Talk?"
Sample of "Will We Talk?" from Hypersonic Missiles (2019)

"Spit Of You"
Sample of "Spit Of You" from Seventeen Going Under (2021)

Fender's music falls under the broad category of rock. He has been classified as an indie rock and British rock singer. His musical style incorporates the indie rock, heartland rock, pop rock, Americana, and post-punk genres. Fender's music nonetheless adheres to the sound of 1990s Britpop, manifested in the 2019 album Hypersonic Missiles. Classic jangle pop also defined his musical style and has been particularly recognisable on songs such as "The Borders" and the reverberant opening guitar riff of "Seventeen Going Under". "Play God" has been characterised as math rock with a dynamic groove, "Saturday" as rhythm and blues, and "That Sound" as power pop. The indie rock song "Will We Talk?", structured around abundant melodies, has been widely viewed, in essence, as rock and roll. "Last to Make It Home" has been described as an "acoustic-style ballad" with an Americana–folk rock chord structure. The motif of "Spit Of You" is based on three sequences of guitar arpeggios, a Fender's trademark that he plays on the 2021 album Seventeen Going Under alongside Thompson and Atkinson, creating "movement" to the main chord progression. "Howdon Aldi Death Queue" displays an occasional penchant for punk rock.

The Guardian's Alexis Petridis opined that the second album is rooted in contemporary times and closely connected with the early 1980s period of The Jam and The Specials. Max Winkler of the Hamburg Evening Newspaper wonders if Fender is "the future of rock'n'roll", whilst Neil McCormick of The Telegraph writes that through his music, he "continues his crusade to keep Britain safe for rock'n'roll". Financial Times critic Ludovic Hunter-Tilney felt a musical approach leaning towards "classic rock" and considered Fender to have established his "authentically British version" of heartland rock as Dire Straits had done in the 1980s. The Times critic Will Hodgkinson agreed, calling it "Fender's nostalgia set to a classic rock sound". He has been dubbed "The British heartland rocker" by WFPK's Kyle Meredith.

He is a multi-instrumentalist, playing guitar, bass, piano, synthesizer, Hammond organ, glockenspiel, harmonica, and mandolin. The characteristic features of Fender's music include the jangly guitar tone of Jazzmasters, solos, saxophone, and also horns and strings. MusicRadar has described the pulsating rhythmic sounds of Michael's drum beats as "huge" and explained that he displays "discipline and respect" for Fender's anthemic songs. (Note: In late 2021, Drew Michael was voted number two in a MusicRadar reader's poll for "The 10 best rock drummers in the world right now", and Fender was voted number two on their poll of "The 10 best songwriter guitarists in the world right now".) Michael's drumming style has been characterised by motorik beats.

Fender is known for his high tenor voice and strong Geordie accent (North East England). His manager said he was "totally struck by this incredible voice" when Fender, then 18, began singing under the encouragement of his boss at Low Lights Tavern. Moon described his voice as "earnest" with keening harmonies. Fender has stated that he tends to sing at the top of his vocal range when writing and performing, saying he is "always belting." Ellie Harrison of The Independent regarded Fender's voice as "big and sonorous" and expressing "moments of vulnerability". The Telegraph's James Hall wrote that his live vocals were "rich and vibrant" in the upper register, particularly on medium tempo songs like "Mantra". Petridis observed that in ascending pitch on the song "Aye", Fender's voice "takes on the keening quality" of John Lydon.

=== Songwriting ===
Fender told Billboard in 2019 that he was entering a phase of writing lyrics first due to his enjoyment of "just writing poetry or just writing freeform". Fender mostly writes songs on the piano and converts them to the guitar, continuing the creative development to find slight variations of chords on the latter. Byrne argued that Fender distinguished himself as "an artist interested in expressing lived emotion" when releasing his series of singles from 2017. Rolling Stone music columnist Tim Ingham observed a "near-complete decline of the solo singer-songwriter pop hit" over the previous decade in 2019 and described Fender as "a rarity in the modern music industry: a major label priority act ... who entirely writes all of his own material".

Triple J's Al Newstead wrote that Hypersonic Missiles "introduced him as a songwriter with skill, honesty, and a great love for anthemic rock". Newstead further said that Fender "embrace the voice-of-a-generation mantle thrust upon him" on the first two albums' politically charged songs but, by contrast, is more effective at addressing mental health-related topics and personal experiences. Moon deemed Fender's lyrics "powerful, poetic, personal" and his songwriting "descriptive", imbued with reality and details, exemplified in the lyrics of "The Dying Light", "This town is a world of waifs and strays, comedy giants, penniless heroes/Dead men at the bar, I drank with them all." Petridis felt he moved away from Springsteen's influence on the second album and noted a significant improvement in the lyrical department through an approach to songwriting that placed greater autobiographical emphasis with the addition of romantic, novelistic aspects.

The urban environment and local pubs' atmosphere often serve as a thematic framework for his songs. Songs provide the narrative of his personal experiences and those of his friends, ranging from "troubled childhoods", working class life in North Shields, to male suicides. His songs also addressed communication, romantic failures, and relationships—including "complicated" ones between fathers and sons. Some lyrics were about self-esteem and growing up in England, whilst others chronicled the country's political spectrum and the ensuing tensions. Others thematically refer to teenage life, friendship, mental health, poverty, "toxic masculinity", social media addiction, and "faceless" politicians. Seventeen Going Under was described as Fender "turning the mirror on himself; his adolescence and the trials and tribulations of growing up", with North Shields as "the ever-present backdrop".

In 2022, some of his lyrics are being used for English teaching to Year 9 pupils as part of the Key Stage 3 National Curriculum for England at Whitley Bay High School due to the quality of their writing and "certain messages" conveyed that "resonate with young people".

=== Equipment ===
Fender plays guitars of the same name. He began playing a Les Paul in his early days, and then the Fender brand offered to provide him with free equipment. He subsequently developed an interest in the sound of the Jazzmaster. He also uses a powder blue Stratocaster and a Takamine acoustic guitar; both are gifts from Elton John. Although his guitar was previously tuned to E♭ standard, he adjusted it to his belt voice and switched to C♯ standard. He recorded the second album tuned to C standard and Nashville tuning and used light gauge strings.

== Backing band members ==
Current

- Dean Thompson – guitar, backing vocals (2017–present)
- Tom Ungerer – bass guitar (2017–present)
- Joe Atkinson – keyboards, synthesisers, guitar, backing vocals (2017–present)
- Drew Michael – drums (2017–present)
- Johnny "Blue Hat" Davis – saxophone (2019–present)
- Mark Webb – trumpet (2021–present)
- Brooke Bentham – guitar, piano, backing vocals (2024–present)

== Discography ==
=== Studio albums ===
- Hypersonic Missiles (2019)
- Seventeen Going Under (2021)
- People Watching (2025)

=== Extended plays ===
- Dead Boys (2018)

== Filmography ==
=== Film ===
Year	Title	Role	Notes	Ref.
2025	Sam Fender - Live at London Stadium	Himself	Concert film	

=== Television ===
Year	Title	Role	Notes	Ref.
2011	Vera	Luke Armstrong	Episode: "Hidden Depths"	
2012	Wolfblood	Dean	Episode: "Maddy Cool!"	

== Tours ==
- Hypersonic Missiles Tour (2019)
- Seventeen Going Under Tour (2022)
- People Watching Tour (2024–2025)
- North America Tour (2027)
- Proper Massive Stadium Tour (2027)

== Awards and nominations ==
Award	Year	Recipient(s) and nominee(s)	Category	Result	Ref.
BBC Music Sound of...	2018	Himself	Sound of 2018	Longlisted	
Brit Awards	2019	Himself	Critics' Choice Award	Won	
Brit Awards	2020	Himself	Best New Artist	Nominated	
Brit Awards	2022	Himself	British Artist of the Year	Nominated	
Brit Awards	2022	Himself	Best Rock/Alternative Act	Won	
Brit Awards	2022	Seventeen Going Under	British Album of the Year	Nominated	
Brit Awards	2025	Himself	British Artist of the Year	Nominated	
Brit Awards	2025	Himself	Best Alternative/Rock Act	Won	
Brit Awards	2026	Himself	Best Alternative/Rock Act	Won	
Brit Awards	2026	Himself	British Artist of the Year	Nominated	
Brit Awards	2026	People Watching	British Album of the Year	Nominated	
Brit Awards	2026	"Rein Me In" (with Olivia Dean)	Song of the Year	Won	
Brit Billion Award	2025	Himself	—N/a	Won	
FanFair Alliance Award	2019	Himself (Shared with manager Owain Davies)	Outstanding Contribution to Live Music	Won	
Global Awards	2020	Himself	Best Indie Act	Nominated	
Global Awards	2022	Himself	Best Indie Act	Won	
Global Awards	2022	Himself	Best British Act	Nominated	
Global Awards	2023	Himself	Best Indie Act	Nominated	
Global Awards	2023	Himself	Best British Act	Nominated	
Global Awards	2023	Himself	Best Male	Nominated	
Ivor Novello Awards	2020	"Dead Boys"	Best Song Musically and Lyrically	Nominated	
Ivor Novello Awards	2022	"Seventeen Going Under"	Best Song Musically and Lyrically	Won	
Ivor Novello Awards	2026	Himself	Songwriter of the Year	Won	
Mercury Prize	2022	Seventeen Going Under	Album of the Year	Shortlisted	
Mercury Prize	2025	People Watching	Album of the Year	Won	
Music Producers Guild Awards	2026	People Watching	Album of the Year	Nominated	
NME Awards	2020	Himself	Best New Act in the World	Nominated	
NME Awards	2020	Himself	Best New British Act	Nominated	
NME Awards	2022	Seventeen Going Under	Best Album by a UK Artist	Won	
NME Awards	2022	Seventeen Going Under	Best Album in the World	Won	
NME Awards	2022	Himself	Best Solo Act from the UK	Nominated	
NME Awards	2022	Himself	Best Solo Act in the World	Nominated	
NME Awards	2022	"Seventeen Going Under"	Best Song by a UK Artist	Nominated	
NME Awards	2022	"Seventeen Going Under"	Best Song in the World	Nominated	
Northern Music Awards	2024	Himself	Artist of the Year	Nominated	
O_{2} Silver Clef Awards	2026	Himself	Best Live Act	Won	
Q Awards	2019	Himself	Q Breakthrough Act	Nominated	
Rolling Stone UK Awards	2022	"Seventeen Going Under"	Song of the Year Award	Won	
Rolling Stone UK Awards	2025	People Watching	The Album Award	Nominated	
Rolling Stone UK Awards	2025	Himself	The Artist Award	Nominated	
Rolling Stone UK Awards	2026	"Rein Me In" (with Olivia Dean)	The Song of the Year Award	Nominated	
Scottish Music Awards	2021	Himself	Best UK Award	Won	
South Bank Sky Arts Award	2022	Seventeen Going Under	Pop Award	Nominated	
UK Music Video Awards	2019	"Dead Boys"	Best Rock Video − UK	Won	
UK Music Video Awards	2020	"The Borders"	Best Rock Video − UK	Nominated	
UK Music Video Awards	2021	"Seventeen Going Under"	Best Rock Video − UK	Nominated	
UK Music Video Awards	2022	"Getting Started" (Director's Cut)	Best Rock Video − UK	Nominated	
UK Music Video Awards	2022	"Spit Of You"	Best Rock Video − UK	Won	
UK Music Video Awards	2022	"Get You Down"	Best Color Grading in a Video	Nominated	
UK Music Video Awards	2025	"Remember My Name"	Best Rock Video − UK	Nominated	
UK Music Video Awards	2025	"People Watching"	Best Rock Video − UK	Nominated	
UK Music Video Awards	2025	"People Watching"	Best Editing in a Video	Nominated	
