= Hold Out (Sam Fender song) =

Single by Sam Fender
- Released: 13 February 2020
- Recorded: 2019
- Length: 2:43
- Label: Polydor
- Songwriter(s): Sam Fender
- Producer(s): Bramwell Bronte

Sam Fender singles chronology
"All Is on My Side" (2019)	"Hold Out" (2020)	"Winter Song" (2020)

"Hold Out" is a song performed by English musician Sam Fender. The song was released as a digital download on 13 February 2020 by Polydor Records. The song was written by Sam Fender and produced by Bramwell Bronte.

== Background ==
Fender originally wrote the song when he was twenty. Talking about the song, he said: "It's about going out on the lash back home which was really just a form of escape." Fender explained that the lyrics address issues facing young people and partying and alcohol.

== Music video ==
A music video to accompany "Hold Out" was first released on YouTube on 13 February 2020. The music video was directed by Jack Whitefield.

== Personnel ==
Credits adapted from Tidal.

- Bramwell Bronte – producer, associated performer, engineer, programming, studio personnel
- Sam Fender – composer, lyricist, associated performer, bass, guitar, vocals
- Drew Michael – associated performer, drums
- Johnny 'Blue Hat' Davis – associated performer, saxophone
- Joseph Atkinson – associated performer, synthesizer
- Dean Thompson – engineer, studio personnel
- Rich Costey – mixer, studio personnel

== Charts ==
Chart (2020)	Peak position
Scotland (OCC)	95
UK Singles Downloads (OCC)	100

== Release history ==
Region	Date	Format	Label
United Kingdom	13 February 2020	Digital download; streaming	Polydor
