= People Watching (Sam Fender song) =

2024 single by Sam Fender

Single by Sam Fender

from the album People Watching
- B-side: "Me & the Dog"; "Tyrants"
- Released: 15 November 2024
- Genre: Heartland rock
- Length: 5:04; 4:02 (radio edit)
- Label: Polydor
- Songwriter: Sam Fender
- Producers: Sam Fender; Adam Granduciel; Joe Atkinson; Dean Thompson

Sam Fender singles chronology
"Homesick" (2024)	"People Watching" (2024)	"Wild Long Lie" (2024)

Music video
- "People Watching" on YouTube

"People Watching" is a song by English singer-songwriter Sam Fender. It was released on 15 November 2024 as the lead single from his third studio album of the same name. It was written as a tribute to his "late friend and mentor" Annie Orwin, who he described as being "like a surrogate mother" to him. He drew inspiration from his walks to and from her care home. Fender co-produced the song in Los Angeles with Adam Granduciel of the American rock band the War on Drugs.

The CD single features an exclusive bonus track, "Me & the Dog", while the 7-inch single includes another exclusive track, "Tyrants". The song peaked at number four on the Official UK Charts.

== Background and release ==
In 2024, Fender began hinting at the imminent release of his third studio album. During a warm-up gig in Plymouth on 3 August, the singer premiered the new tracks "People Watching" and "Nostalgia’s Lie" live for the first time and announced that both would be included on his upcoming album. On 7 October, the singer confirmed in a social media post that he had finished and mastered his new album. A day later, Fender released the live version of "People Watching" from Boardmasters on his YouTube channel. On 6 November, Fender shared new previews of the song through his social media, revealing parts of its lyrics. On 8 November, the singer announced that he would release his new single, "People Watching," on 15 November 2024.

== Composition and lyrics ==
"People Watching" is 5 minutes and 11 seconds long. Fender wrote the song and also participated in the production along with Adam Granduciel, member of the American band The War on Drugs. "People Watching" sees Fender reflect on the passers-by he observes on the street, feeling "envious at the glimmer of hope" in their lives. The song was described in a press release as "written for his late friend and mentor, Annie Orwin", and is based on Fender's "thoughts as he traveled to and from her palliative care home". Fender told BBC Radio 1 that the song was inspired by walks to and from the care home where Annie died.

"People Watching" has been described as a heartland rock song. The opening verse presents raw vulnerability, showing a moment of relief from loneliness and ego. In the second verse, Fender criticises the failings of the healthcare system, referring to it as understaffed and controlled by insensitive hands.

== Critical reception ==
"People Watching" received positive reviews from critics. Rhian Daly of NME gave the song a four-star review and said it was a "song whose lyrics you feel like you can walk through and one that seamlessly weaves together big picture concerns with personal experience". Cerys Millard of The Courier called the song one of Fender's best to date.

== Commercial performance ==
"People Watching" debuted at number four on the UK Singles Chart on 22 November 2024, becoming Fender's third top ten single following "Seventeen Going Under" and "Homesick". It also became the first alternative song by a British artist to debut inside the top four of the chart in over a decade. On 19 November 2024 the song topped the UK's Official Trending Chart. On 3 January 2025 the single went to no. 1 on the UK Official Singles Sales Chart.

== Music video ==
The music video for "People Watching" was released on 29 January 2025. It was directed by Stuart A. McIntyre and starred Irish actor Andrew Scott. The video features Scott as a drifter on a solitary journey. Waking up on a sidewalk, he hitchhikes, visits desolate diners, and navigates moments of isolation and fleeting companionship. Throughout the video, glimpses of his childhood appear, hinting at a past he is both escaping and longing for. In between scenes of self-destruction, he sketches an image that ultimately reveals a portrait of his mother.

Describing his involvement in the video, Scott called "People Watching" a "masterpiece" and a "true friend." He stated that working on it was a cathartic experience and expressed gratitude to Sam, the creative team behind the film, and his mother, whom he dedicated the performance to.

== Live performance ==
He performed the song during the Brit Awards 2025

== Track listing ==
- Edit
1. "People Watching" (Edit) – 4:02
- CD single
1. "People Watching" – 5:04
2. "Me & The Dog" – 4:13
- 7-inch
1. "People Watching" – 5:04
2. "Tyrants" – 3:15

== Charts ==
=== Weekly charts ===
Weekly chart performance for "People Watching"
Chart (2024–2025)	Peak position
Canada Mainstream Rock (Billboard Canada)	40
Canada Modern Rock (Billboard Canada)	4
Croatia International Airplay (Top lista)	20
Finland Airplay (Radiosoittolista)	94
Iceland (Tónlistinn)	40
Ireland (IRMA)	25
Japan Hot Overseas (Billboard Japan)	17
Lithuania Airplay (TopHit)	71
Netherlands Airplay (MegaCharts)	50
New Zealand Hot Singles (RMNZ)	24
Poland (Polish Airplay Top 100)	66
Poland Airplay (TopHit)	42
Portugal Airplay (AFP)	25
San Marino (SMRRTV Top 50)	28
UK Singles (OCC)	4
US Adult Alternative Airplay (Billboard)	11
US Alternative Airplay (Billboard)	26
US Rock & Alternative Airplay (Billboard)	38
Venezuela Anglo Airplay (Monitor Latino)	6

=== Monthly charts ===
Monthly chart performance for "People Watching"
Chart (2025)	Peak position
Lithuania Airplay (TopHit)	92

=== Year-end charts ===
Year-end chart performance for "People Watching"
Chart (2025)	Position
Canada Modern Rock (Billboard)	16
UK Singles (OCC)	50

== Certifications ==
Certifications for "People Watching"
Region	Certification	Certified units/sales
United Kingdom (BPI)	Platinum	600,000^{‡}
^{‡} Sales+streaming figures based on certification alone.
