= The Courier (Newcastle University newspaper) =

Student newspaper of Newcastle University's Students' Union

- Front page from 4 January 2019
- Type: Fortnightly student newspaper
- Format: Broadsheet
- Owner: Newcastle University Students' Union
- Editor: Trinity Eadie
- Deputy editor: TBC
- Founded: 1948
- Language: English
- Headquarters: Newcastle University Students Union, Newcastle University, Newcastle upon Tyne
- Circulation: 12,000
- Website: thecourieronline.co.uk

The Courier is the free student weekly newspaper of Newcastle University's Students' Union. It is entirely written and edited by student volunteers, except for the chief editor, which is a paid sabbatical officer position in the students union. Articles which are included in the 40-page print edition are also published online. The newspaper is divided into sections, including current affairs (news, campus comment, opinion, science); life and style (lifestyle, fashion and beauty, relationships, food and drink, travel); culture (film, tv, music, arts, gaming); sport and puzzles.

== History ==
Established in 1948 as King's Courier, while Newcastle University was still incorporated within Durham University as King's College, the first issue was published on 18 November 1948. Several of the paper's founders, including its first editor Stuart Shaw and business manager Allan Marsh, had previously helped to set up Palatinate, a newspaper for students at both the Newcastle and Durham divisions of the University, but poor sales in Newcastle prompted Palatinate to refocus as a Durham-only publication after just three issues.

The paper was initially published fortnightly but became a weekly paper in 1960, when the name was shortened to The Courier. The paper expanded through the 1990s and 2000s and is currently 40 pages long. In 2003 a separate culture magazine, Pulp, was launched, which later became a pull-out of the main paper and was reintegrated completely in 2009. Since then, new sections such as lifestyle, science, gaming and travel have been launched within the paper.

The Courier became a free publication in 2002, and after several short-lived websites, thecourieronline.co.uk launched in 2009, giving the paper a regular presence online.

Since 1975, the editor has been elected by a cross-campus ballot of students, with the role becoming a sabbatical position in 1992, making The Courier one of the only student newspapers with a full-time paid editor.

The current weekly readership is around 18,000, mostly students at the university. The newspaper is published on a Monday bi-weekly during term-time. The current editor-in-chief for the 26/27 academic year is Trinity Eadie.

== Awards ==
The Courier has won numerous awards including The Guardian's Student Newspaper of the Year award in 1994, 2012 and 2013. In 2008, The Courier design editor Kerry Hyndman came runner up in The Guardian's student media award for design for her work on the newspaper's entertainment pull-out, Pulp. As part of a redesign of the paper in 2009–2010 Pulp, which was originally independent of The Courier, was discontinued and replaced by a lifestyle section fully integrated into the main body of the paper.
