= Will We Talk? =

Single by Sam Fender

from the album Hypersonic Missiles
- Released: 2 July 2019
- Recorded: 2019
- Genre: Indie rock; rock and roll
- Length: 2:42
- Label: Polydor
- Songwriter: Sam Fender
- Producers: Sam Fender; Rich Costey; Bramwell Bronte

Sam Fender singles chronology
"Hypersonic Missiles" (2019)	"Will We Talk?" (2019)	"The Borders" (2019)

"Will We Talk?" is a song performed by English musician Sam Fender. The song was released as a digital download on 2 July 2019 by Polydor Records as the second single from his debut studio album Hypersonic Missiles. The song was written by Fender, who also produced the song along with Rich Costey and Bramwell Bronte. The song peaked at number 43 on the UK Singles Chart and number 11 on the Scottish Singles Chart. On physical editions of Hypersonic Missiles, the song is titled "Will We Talk in the Morning?".

== Background and composition ==
"Will We Talk?" depicts the tale of a one-night stand. Robin Murray of Clash magazine explained that the song is "a crisp new indie rock burner that rattles along with a rock 'n' roll spirit". Tom Skinner of NME described the song as "a heady blast of high-octane, melody-packed, smash'n'grab rock'n'roll that launches from the traps at full pelt and doesn't relent until the guitars and a string-section subside three minutes later."

== Music video ==
A music video to accompany the release of "Will We Talk?" was first released on YouTube on 29 August 2019.

== Track listing ==
Digital download
No.	Title	Length
1.	"Will We Talk?"	2:42

Digital download (Remix)
No.	Title	Length
1.	"Will We Talk?" (MK Remix)	3:30

Digital download (Live)
No.	Title	Length
1.	"Will We Talk?" (Live at Capitol Studios, solo)	2:55

== Charts ==
Chart (2019)	Peak position
Belgium (Ultratip Bubbling Under Flanders)	22
Belgium (Ultratip Bubbling Under Wallonia)	48
Mexico Airplay (Billboard)	18
Netherlands Airplay (MegaCharts)	43
Scotland Singles (OCC)	11
Switzerland Airplay (Schweizer Hitparade)	86
UK Singles (OCC)	43
US Adult Alternative Airplay (Billboard)	19

Chart (2022)	Peak position
Ireland (IRMA)	96

== Certifications ==
Certifications for Will We Talk?
Region	Certification	Certified units/sales
United Kingdom (BPI)	2× Platinum	1,200,000^{‡}
^{‡} Sales+streaming figures based on certification alone.

== Release history ==
Region	Date	Format	Label	Ref.
Various	2 July 2019	Digital download; streaming	Polydor	
Italy	5 July 2019	Radio airplay	Capitol	
