= That Sound (Sam Fender song) =

Single by Sam Fender

from the album Hypersonic Missiles
- Released: 22 October 2018
- Recorded: 2018
- Genre: Power pop; indie rock
- Length: 3:25
- Label: Polydor Records
- Songwriter: Sam Fender
- Producer: Bramwell Bronte

Sam Fender singles chronology
"Dead Boys" (2018)	"That Sound" (2018)	"Hypersonic Missiles" (2019)

"That Sound" is a song performed by English musician Sam Fender. The song was released as a digital download on 22 October 2018 by Polydor Records as the fourth single from his debut studio album Hypersonic Missiles. The song was written by Sam Fender and produced by Bramwell Bronte.

== Background ==
The song premiered on Radio 1's ‘Hottest Record in the World’ on 22 October 2018. Fender said the song was a celebration of music and a not-so-subtle middle finger to the naysayers that tend to rear their heads as soon as things start to work out for you, especially back home. He also said, "Music was always ever present when I was growing up, and it’s continued to be the most important and intrinsic part of me. It kept me from going off the rails as a kid and it gave me rare purpose and self-confidence that I couldn’t find from anything else. This song talks loosely about how susceptible you can become to negativity and jealousy, even when you’re at your happiest and most confident. It’s about finding strength to ignore it all, and keep doing your own thing."

== Critical reception ==
Robin Murray from Clash gave the song a positive review stating, "Crisp power pop, it soars towards the crunching chorus, a real ear-worm that stays stuck in your head for days."

== Music video ==
A music video to accompany the release of "That Sound" was first released onto YouTube on 15 November 2018.

== Track listing ==
Digital download
No.	Title	Length
1.	"That Sound"	3:25

== Charts ==
Chart (2019)	Peak position
Belgium (Ultratip Bubbling Under Flanders)	3
UK Singles Downloads (Official Charts)	87

== Certifications ==
Region	Certification	Certified units/sales
United Kingdom (BPI)	Silver	200,000^{‡}
^{‡} Sales+streaming figures based on certification alone.

== Release history ==
Region	Date	Format	Label
United Kingdom	22 October 2018	Digital download; streaming	Polydor Records
