= All Is on My Side =

Single by Sam Fender
- Released: 10 December 2019
- Recorded: 2017
- Length: 4:33
- Label: Polydor Records
- Songwriter: Sam Fender
- Producer: Bramwell Bronte

Sam Fender singles chronology
"The Borders" (2019)	"All Is on My Side" (2019)	"Hold Out" (2020)

"All Is on My Side" is a song performed by English musician Sam Fender. The song was released as a digital download on 10 December 2019. The song was written by Sam Fender and produced by Bramwell Bronte.

== Background ==
Fender performed the song during his live shows, but decided to release the song as a single after fans campaigned for the song's release. On his Twitter account, he said, "This is one of the oldest songs I have, it didn’t make the album. I’ve played it for 5 years and wrote it when I was a baby." He also said in a press release, "‘All Is On My Side’ is a real live favourite for me. It’s been a mainstay in the set for a couple of years now and it’s nice to release this as a bit of a thank you to all the fans at the end of the year."

== Music video ==
A music video to accompany the release of "All Is On My Side" was first released onto YouTube on 10 December 2019. The music video was directed by Jack Whitefield, when talking about the video, he said, "The film was shot entirely on 16mm and 8mm film stock then edited partially by hand using a 1979 Steenbeck editing table. This allowed me to choose specific scenes, remove them from the reel of film and deface them with scratches, tape, holes, and create hand made transitions between scenes."

== Charts ==
Chart (2020)	Peak position
Belgium (Ultratip Bubbling Under Flanders)	19
Belgium (Ultratip Bubbling Under Wallonia)	30

== Certifications ==
Region	Certification	Certified units/sales
United Kingdom (BPI)	Silver	200,000^{‡}
^{‡} Sales+streaming figures based on certification alone.

== Release history ==
Region	Date	Format	Label
United Kingdom	10 December 2019	Digital download; streaming	Polydor Records
