= The Borders (song) =

Single by Sam Fender

from the album Hypersonic Missiles
- Released: 2 September 2019
- Recorded: 2019
- Genre: Heartland rock; jangle pop
- Length: 5:32
- Label: Polydor
- Songwriter: Sam Fender
- Producer: Bramwell Bronte

Sam Fender singles chronology
"Will We Talk?" (2019)	"The Borders" (2019)	"All Is on My Side" (2019)

"The Borders" is a song performed by English musician Sam Fender. The song was released as a digital download on 2 September 2019 by Polydor Records as the seventh single from his debut studio album Hypersonic Missiles. The song peaked at number 59 on the UK Singles Chart. The song was written by Sam Fender and produced by Bramwell Bronte.

== Background ==
In a press release, "The Borders is Fender's personal favourite song from the new album Hypersonic Missiles. At once deeply personal, traumatic event, Sam tells a story of two boys growing up together and then going their separate ways, the release reads. Memories inferred but not directly addressed. It's a storming tune with a powerful story, as so many of Sam's songs are.”

== Music video ==
A music video directed by Thomas James was released for the song on 22 October 2019. The video mirrors the song's lyrics by following a friendship between two boys through time, cutting between their childhood and the present day.

== Track listing ==
Digital download
No.	Title	Length
1.	"The Borders"	5:32

== Charts ==
Chart (2019)	Peak position
UK Singles (Official Charts)	59

== Certifications ==
Region	Certification	Certified units/sales
United Kingdom (BPI)	Platinum	600,000^{‡}
^{‡} Sales+streaming figures based on certification alone.

== Release history ==
Region	Date	Format	Label
United Kingdom	1 September 2019	Digital download; streaming	Polydor
