= Hypersonic Missiles (song) =

Single by Sam Fender

from the album Hypersonic Missiles
- Released: 5 March 2019
- Recorded: 2019
- Genre: Heartland rock; indie rock
- Length: 3:57
- Label: Polydor Records
- Songwriter: Sam Fender
- Producer: Bramwell Bronte

Sam Fender singles chronology
| "That Sound" (2018) | "Hypersonic Missiles" (2019) | "Will We Talk?" (2019) |

"Hypersonic Missiles" is a song written and performed by English musician Sam Fender and produced by Bramwell Bronte. The song was released as a digital download on 5 March 2019 by Polydor Records as the fifth single from his debut studio album Hypersonic Missiles. It peaked at number 48 on the UK Singles Chart. "Hypersonic Missiles" was voted Hottest Record of the Year 2019 by BBC Radio 1 listeners.

== Background ==
In a press release, Fender explained the name of the song was "inspired by a newly developed Russian missile that travels at something like nine times the speed of sound." When describing "Hypersonic Missiles", he said it is "In many ways, an unorthodox love song". He further explained that

Its main focus is on the world around the narrator, who is a complete tin foil hatter. They are convinced the world is on its last legs; they know that it is rife with injustice but feel completely helpless and lacking the necessary intelligence to change it while remaining hopelessly addicted to the fruits of consumerism. Amongst all the chaos is love and celebration, there is this glimmer of hope that runs through the song, a little notion that no matter what happens, these two people are gonna have a fucking good time regardless of the tyrants that run their world, and regardless of the imminent doom from these 'Hypersonic Missiles'.

The lyrics referred to the "bombings in Gaza", the "rising tensions in global politics" and the "corporate machine".

== Music video ==
A music video to accompany the release of "Hypersonic Missiles" was first released onto YouTube on 4 April 2019.

== Track listing ==
Digital download
| No. | Title | Length |
|---|---|---|
| 1. | "Hypersonic Missiles" | 3:57 |

Digital download (Remix)
| No. | Title | Length |
|---|---|---|
| 1. | "Hypersonic Missiles" (Patrick Topping Shields Remix) | 3:58 |
| 2. | "Hypersonic Missiles" (Patrick Topping Extended Shields Remix) | 7:45 |

== Charts ==
| Chart (2019) | Peak position |
|---|---|
| Belgium (Ultratip Bubbling Under Flanders) | 13 |
| Belgium (Ultratip Bubbling Under Wallonia) | 37 |
| Billboard Mexico Ingles Airplay | 11 |
| Scotland Singles (Official Charts) | 16 |
| Switzerland Airplay (Schweizer Hitparade) | 92 |
| UK Singles (Official Charts) | 48 |
| US Adult Alternative Airplay (Billboard) | 15 |

== Certifications ==
| Region | Certification | Certified units/sales |
|---|---|---|
| New Zealand (RMNZ) | Gold | 15,000^{‡} |
| United Kingdom (BPI) | 3× Platinum | 1,800,000^{‡} |
^{‡} Sales+streaming figures based on certification alone.

== Release history ==
| Region | Date | Format | Label | Ref. |
|---|---|---|---|---|
| Various | 5 March 2019 | Digital download; streaming | Polydor | |
| Italy | 8 March 2019 | Radio airplay | Capitol | |
