= Play God (song) =

Single by Sam Fender

from the album Hypersonic Missiles
- Released: 30 March 2017; 23 January 2019 (re-release)
- Recorded: 2017
- Genre: Indie rock; math rock; alternative rock
- Length: 3:46
- Label: Polydor; UMG
- Songwriter: Sam Fender
- Producer: Bramwell Bronte

Sam Fender singles chronology
"Play God" (2017)	"Greasy Spoon" (2017)

Music video
- "Play God" on YouTube

"Play God" is the debut single by English singer and songwriter, Sam Fender. It was released on 30 March 2017 while a music video was released accompanying the single on 23 January 2019. The song has been used in the trailer for the 2021 Netflix superhero series Jupiter's Legacy and is part of the soundtrack for FIFA 19.

== Music video ==
When describing the music video, Fender told NME that "Play God" is "set in an alternate dystopian reality that shares similarities with our own world." Vincent Haycock, who directed the music video described the video as a "satirical interpretation of power".

== Critical reception ==
Harvey James, writing for The Last Magazine praised the song and Fender's singing saying that he has "total mastery over his voice was immediately and strikingly apparent." Clash called the song and the music video "provocative". Maxamillion Polo, writing for Ones to Watch praised the relevancy of the track in regards to modern neoliberalism. Polo wrote that "the track, which is equal parts Orwellian and a reaction to the landmark political decisions in both the UK and the US, is classic Brit-rock at its finest." Polo further complimented the instrumentation of "Play God" saying it is "driven by lush guitar melodies and Fender’s swirling mixture of questioning and positing, “Play God” draws the listener into his world defined by an increasingly uncertain future."

== Charts ==
Chart (2017–19)	Peak position
Scottish Singles Sales (Official Charts)	43
Switzerland Airplay (Schweizer Hitparade)	71
UK Singles (Official Charts)	89

== Certifications ==
Region	Certification	Certified units/sales
United Kingdom (BPI)	Gold	400,000^{‡}
^{‡} Sales+streaming figures based on certification alone.
