= Lucius (band) =

American band

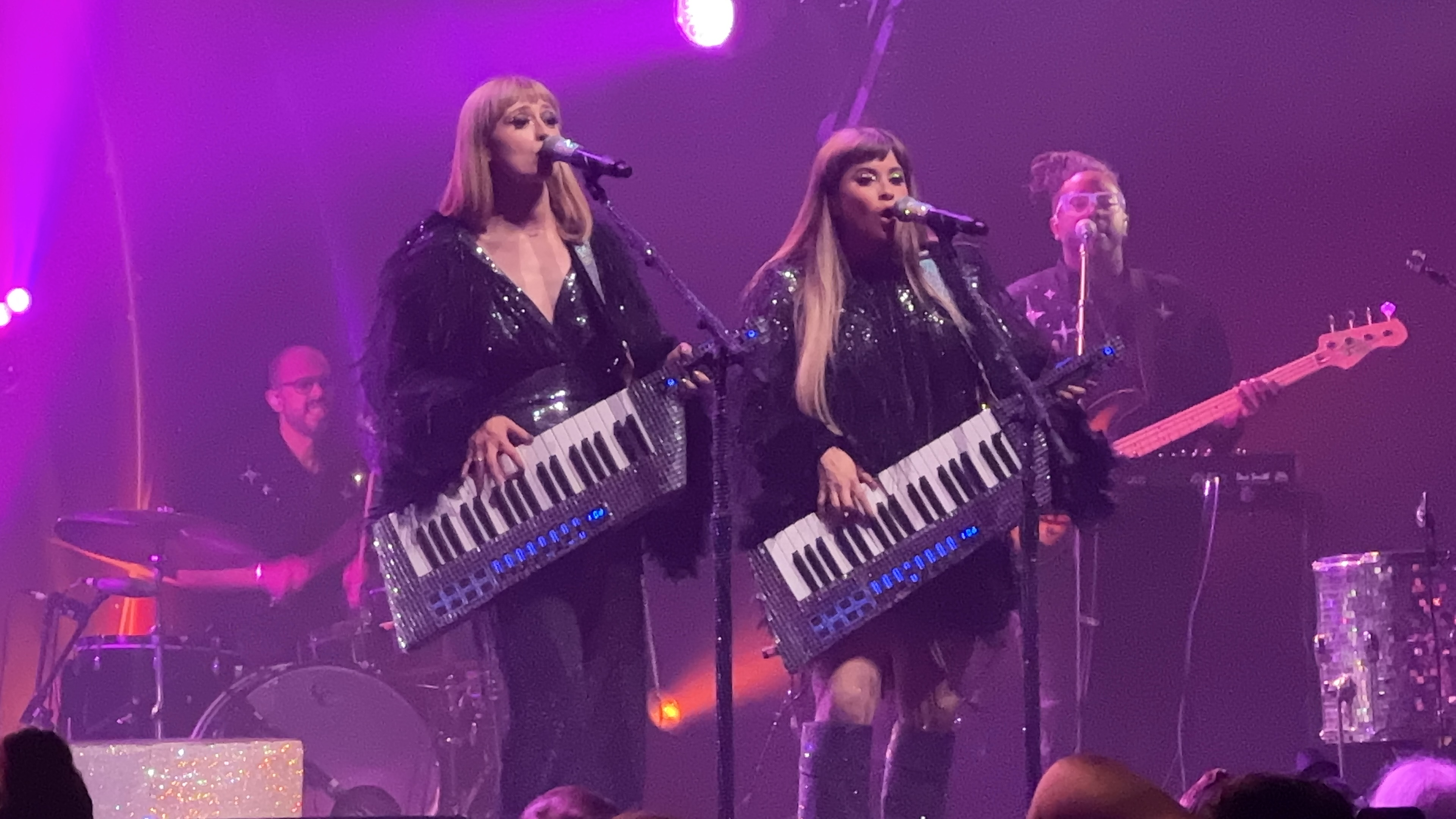
- Lucius in 2022

Background information
- Origin: Brooklyn, New York
- Genres: Indie pop; country pop
- Years active: 2007–present
- Labels: Mom + Pop Music; Dine Alone Records; Play It Again Sam
- Members: Jess Wolfe; Holly Laessig; Dan Molad; Peter Lalish
- Past members: Andrew Burri
- Website: ilovelucius.com

Lucius is an American four-piece indie pop band. The group was founded in 2007 by lead vocalists Jess Wolfe and Holly Laessig, joined by drummer Dan Molad, guitarist Peter Lalish, and, formerly, multi-instrumentalist Andrew Burri. Originating in Brooklyn, the band relocated to Los Angeles in 2015.

They have released four studio albums to date, including their most recent, Lucius, in May 2025. Their music has received critical acclaim from The New York Times, Rolling Stone, NPR and The Village Voice. Paste named them as one of the best live acts in 2015. Wolfe and Laessig have also contributed vocals for artists such as Roger Waters, Harry Styles, Jeff Tweedy, Jackson Browne, John Legend, Mavis Staples, John Prine, Sheryl Crow, Grace Potter, Goose, The War on Drugs, The Killers, Brandi Carlile, Lukas Nelson & Promise of the Real, Brandy Clark, and Joni Mitchell.

== History ==
=== Songs from the Bromley House and band formation (2005–2011) ===
Jess Wolfe and Holly Laessig first met in 2005 as students at the Berklee College of Music and began performing together. In 2007, they founded Lucius after moving to Ditmas Park, Brooklyn to pursue a musical career. The two lived in an old Victorian mansion which had a 60-year-old recording studio and vintage pianos inside.

In 2009, Wolfe and Laessig self-released Songs from the Bromley House, a biographical ode to the house and the experiences that they had in their Brooklyn home. During this period, they were joined by producer Doug Wamble. The band made a one-time pressing CD of the album and has not released the album since.

Shortly after the release of Songs from the Bromley House, Wolfe and Laessig connected with Dan Molad. By 2010, the three were collaborating on future Lucius music. During this period, Pete Lalish was introduced by Molad, and the two soon joined Lucius, making it a four-piece. About a year later, Molad met singer and guitarist Andy Burri who was invited to join the band. Following this, in 2011, most of the music the band had already made together was re-recorded and later released as their debut EP.

On July 9, 2020, Lucius announced they would be digitally re-releasing Songs from the Bromley House to raise funds for businesses affected by the COVID-19 virus. Wolfe told fans the news during an "Ask Me Anything" portion of their livestream series, Turning It Around: A Community Rebuilding Concert. The album, she said, would be up for purchase on the band's website for a limited time along with several other unique items created especially for the streaming series.

=== Lucius EP and Wildewoman (2011–2015) ===
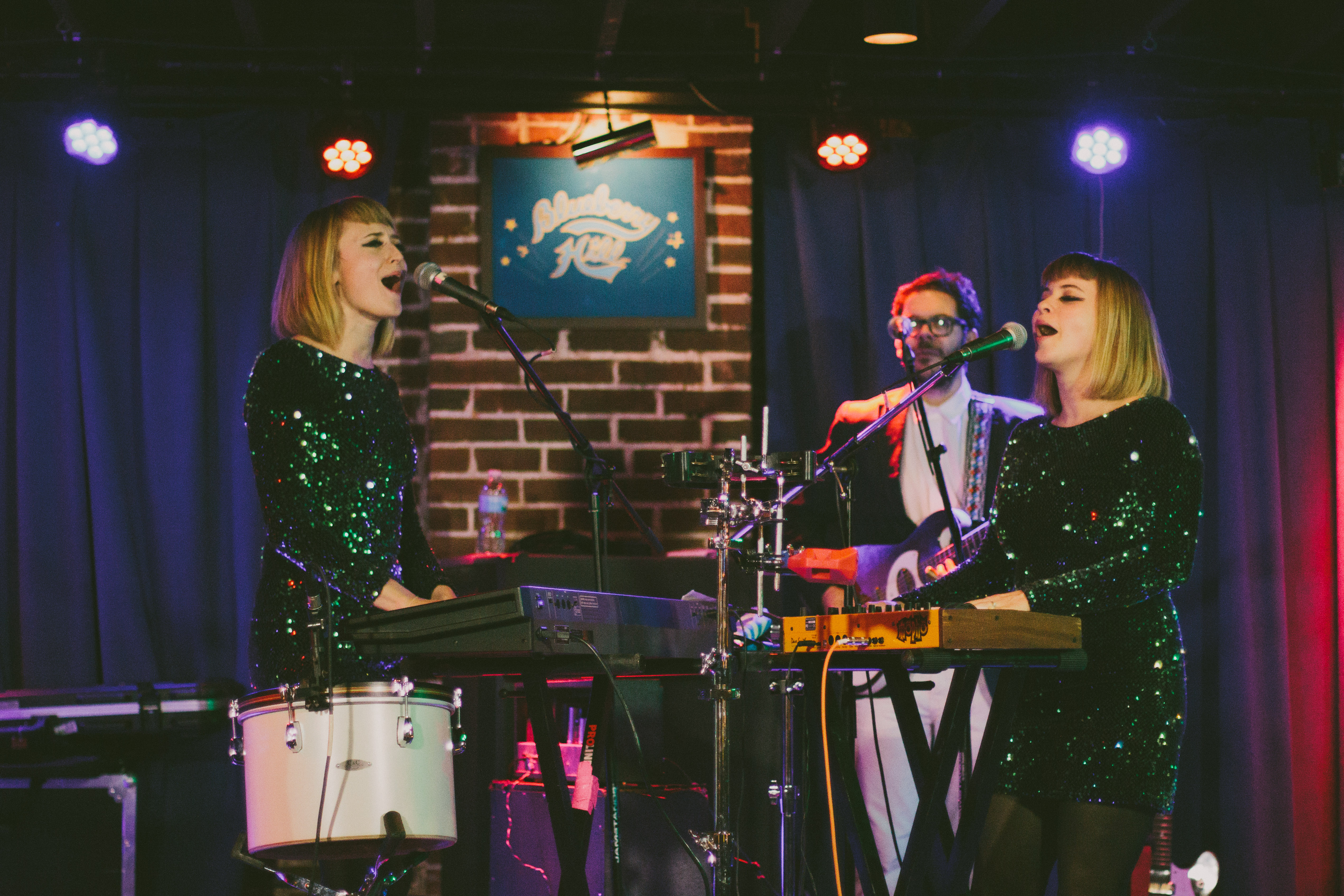
Lucius performing at Blueberry Hill in 2013

The quintet released a self-titled EP in February 2012. Lucius received several placements in TV shows including Grey's Anatomy and Catfish: The TV Show. The band did a Tiny Desk Concerts performance in January 2013 which is hailed by fans as one of their most iconic performances to this day. That same year, the Silver Sound Music Video Film Festival + Band Battle awarded the "Go Home" video as Best Animation. Their song "Until We Get There" gained significant popularity after its feature in season 2, episode 24 of the TV show New Girl.

The band toured the EP throughout the first half of 2013 while finishing the recording of Wildewoman–produced by band member Dan Molad. Mom + Pop Music released Wildewoman in North America on October 15, 2013. It received favorable reviews from Rolling Stone and Consequence of Sound. The album was released worldwide on March 31, 2014, via Play It Again Sam. The Guardian described it as "60s girl group-inspired songs doused in a tonic of baroque pop and saccharine folk." The record was praised for its eclectic mix of musical styles that ranged from retro pop to reflective folk.

The song "Until We Get There" was featured in the film If I Stay and was included on the 2014 soundtrack.

During their world tour between the fall of 2013 and the end of 2014, Lucius also played music festivals and opened for artists including Tegan and Sara, The Head and the Heart, Sara Bareilles, Andrew Bird, City and Colour, and Jack White.

The deluxe version of Wildewoman was released in October 2014. It features live recordings and covers, with one version of their song "How Loud Your Heart Gets" produced by Spoon's Jim Eno for Spotify. The band ended their world tour with a sold-out show at Terminal 5 in New York on December 6, 2014.

=== Good Grief (2016– early 2017) ===
The band's second album, Good Grief, was released on March 11, 2016. It was co-produced and engineered by Grammy-winning engineer Shawn Everett, and was mixed by Tom Elmhirst. Songs were inspired by the band's two years on the road with Wildewoman, and written in late 2015 when the band relocated from Brooklyn to Los Angeles. Departing from their previous sound, the album focused on "moody Eighties-synth melodies and raw lyrics about the hardships of marriage."

The deluxe edition of Good Grief features the band's cover of The Kinks' song "Strangers" which gained attention from a crowd-sourced video of the band performing in Petaluma, California in August 2014.

In July 2015, Wolfe and Laessig performed with Roger Waters and My Morning Jacket at the Newport Folk Festival.

The band has also performed tracks from Good Grief on The Ellen DeGeneres Show, The Late Show with Stephen Colbert, and Late Night with Seth Meyers. "Born Again Teen" and "Dusty Trails" were featured on the fifth episode of Cameron Crowe's show Roadies. In the final episode of the first season, Wolfe and Laessig performed the Lowell George song "Willin" with Jackson Browne. In September 2016, Andrew Burri departed from the band.

In September and October 2016, the band performed with Waters and his band for three shows in Mexico City and the Desert Trip Festival in Indio, California.

On November 25, 2016, the band released a two-song 10 inch vinyl record titled Pulling Teeth which contained two B-sides–"Pulling Teeth" and "The Punisher".

=== Nudes and Touring with Roger Waters (mid 2017–2021) ===
The band released their first compilation album, Nudes, in March 2018. The collection features acoustic versions of songs from the band's back catalogue, new songs, and a duet with Roger Waters.

Wolfe and Laessig joined Waters to sing backup vocals on the Us + Them Tour. The pair also sang a featured duet based on Clare Torrey's wordless vocals in The Great Gig in the Sky. The tour covered North America, New Zealand, Australia, Europe, South America, and Mexico. The world tour began in Kansas City in May 2017, and ended in Monterrey, Mexico in December 2018.

=== Second Nature (2022–2024) ===
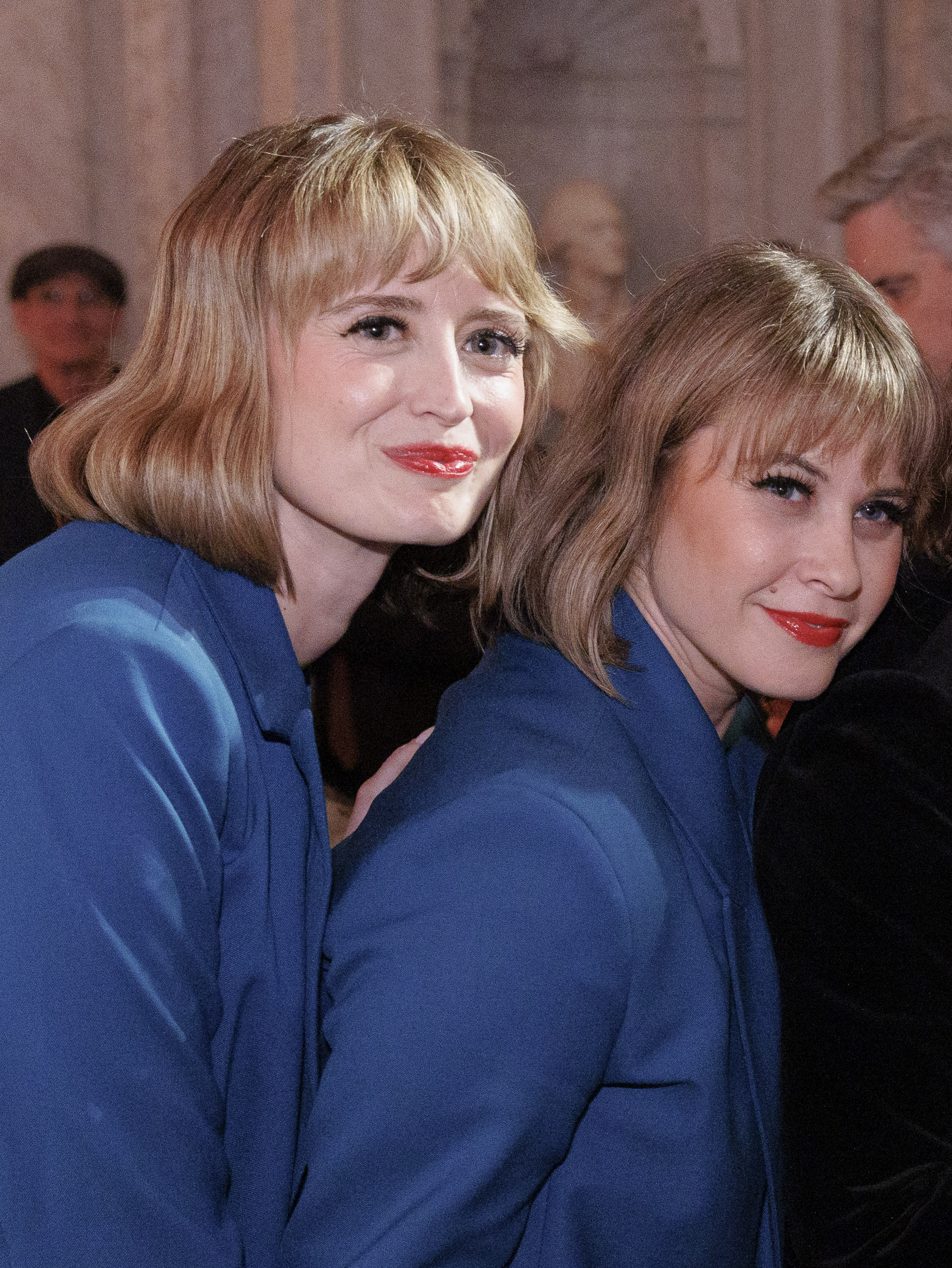
Holly Laessig and Jess Wolfe in 2023

After years of collaborations, Lucius returned to their own music with their fourth studio album, Second Nature, on April 8, 2022. Second Nature was produced by Dave Cobb and Brandi Carlile and released on the Mom + Pop Music label. The lead single "Next to Normal" was released simultaneously with the album announcement on January 11, 2022, followed by three other singles "White Lies", "Heartbursts", and "Dance Around It"–a dance song that features Sheryl Crow and Brandi Carlile.

In a press release, Lucius member Jess Wolfe stated that the album derived from the personal experiences of grief that she and the rest of the band experienced during the pandemic, further adding that the album's musical direction was intended for the band to "[dance their] way through the darkness".

Second Nature earned Lucius a nomination for Best Pop Record from The American Association of Independent Music.

On November 2, 2022, Lucius released "Muse" as a single.

Lucius toured Second Nature on their headlining North American tour throughout 2022 and 2023. They also toured with Shakey Graves throughout summer 2023 and supported Gregory Alan Isakov in the fall.

Lucius supported The War on Drugs and The National in Summer and Fall 2024. During the tour Lucius performed "I Don't Live Here Anymore" with The War on Drugs.

In 2024, Lucius contributed harmony vocals to several tracks on Grammy-winning producer T Bone Burnett’s album The Other Side, Burnett’s first solo release in nearly twenty years. Their vocals appear on “Waiting for You,” “The Pain of Love,” “The Race Is Won,” and “Little Darling,” complementing the album’s Americana-leaning production.

In 2024, as enough time had passed to avoid any conflict with their old label, Lucius re-recordedthe Wildewoman album with their new bandmates under the title Wildewoman (The New Recordings). Marcus Mumford, Devon Gilfillian, and frequent collaborator Brandi Carlile joined Lucius on the new versions.

=== Lucius (2025) ===
In February 2025 the band announced a new self-titled album Lucius, set to be released on May 2, 2025, alongside The Gold Rush Tour set to begin on May 6, 2025.

On February 6, 2025, Lucius released "Gold Rush" as the first single on the album. A second single, "Impressions" featuring Madison Cunningham, was released on March 4, 2025. A third single, "Do It All For You" was released on April 4, 2025.

== Collaborations ==
Outside Lucius, Wolfe and Laessig have been involved in many albums as guest vocalists.

- "Sonsick", "Bar", "Crueler Kind", "The Count", "Oh Darling" & "Daedalus (What We Have)" (San Fermin) – San Fermin (2013)
- "High As Hello", "Wait for Love", "Low Key", "Slow Love", "Nobody Dies Anymore", "I'll Sing It", "Where My Love" & "I'll Never Know" (Tweedy) – Sukierae (2014)
- "It's Time to Come Home", "Traces of Our Tears", "Stardust", "1000 Seasons", "Damaris", "Irrational Things", "Thought of Sound", "Song of Remembering", "Seven Years" & "The Future" (The Rentals) – Lost in Alphaville (2014)
- New Haven (Chadwick Stokes and Lucius) – The Horse Comanche (2015)
- "(What's So Funny 'Bout) Peace, Love, And Understanding" (Shovels & Rope) – Busted Jukebox, Volume 1 (2015)
- "Picture of a Man" (Dawes) – We're All Gonna Die (2016)
- "Penthouse Floor", "Love Me Now", "What You Do To Me" & "Surefire" (John Legend) – Darkness and Light (2016)
- "Déja Vu", "The Last Refugee", "Picture That", "Is This the Life We Really Want?", "The Most Beautiful Girl", "Smell the Roses", "Wait for Her" & "Part of Me Died" (Roger Waters) – Is This the Life We Really Want? (2017)
- "Defibrillation" (The Barr Brothers) – Queens of the Breakers (2017)
- "Lucky Penny" (JD McPherson) – Undivided Heart & Soul (2017)
- "I Remember Her" (Ingrid Michaelson) – Alter Egos EP (2017)
- "Pain" (The War On Drugs) – A Deeper Understanding (2017)
- "Set Me Down On A Cloud", "Die Alone", "Fool Me Once", "Carolina", "Forget About Georgia" (Lukas Nelson & Promise of the Real) – Lukas Nelson & Promise Of The Real (2017)
- "Come Again" (Kurt Vile) – Bottle It In (2018)
- "Mistakes We Should Have Made" (Dawes) – Passwords (2018)
- "Babe I Know", "Coolin' Out" (Nathaniel Rateliff & The Night Sweats) – Tearing At The Seams (2018)
- "Giving You Away" (Lukas Nelson & Promise of the Real) – Forget About Georgia EP (2018)
- "There's a Light" (Jonathan Wilson) – Rare Birds (2018)
- "Don't" (Sheryl Crow) – Threads (2019)
- "Shoulder Charge", "Football to the Path" (Jesca Hoop) – Stonechild (2019)
- "No Need to Argue" (Hannah Georgas) – No Need To Argue (2019)
- "Love is Love", "Back to Me", "Reposession", "Desire", "Please" (Grace Potter) – Daylight (2019)
- "Treat People with Kindness" (Harry Styles) – Fine Line (2019)
- "Straight to Hell", "Ordinary Man (feat. Elton John)", "Holy for Tonight" (Ozzy Osbourne) – Ordinary Man (2020)
- "My God (feat. Weyes Blood)", "Caution" (The Killers) - Imploding The Mirage (2020)
- "I Don't Live Here Anymore" (The War On Drugs) – I Don't Live Here Anymore (2021)
- "You and Me on the Rock" (Brandi Carlile) – In These Silent Days (2021)
- "Wasted All Night" (Cold War Kids) - New Age Norms 3 (2021)
- "The Getting By II" (The Killers) - Pressure Machine (Deluxe) (2022)
- "Howling" (SYML) (2022)
- "Everything Else But Rain" (Until The Ribbon Breaks) (2023)
- "Tell Her You Don't Love Her" (Brandy Clark) (2023)
- "Waiting for You", "The Pain of Love", "The Race Is Won", "Little Darling" (T Bone Burnett) – The Other Side (2024)
- "Come Back" (Ringo Starr) (2025)
- "Silver Spoons" (Portugal. the Man) (2025)

== Film and television ==
Lucius have composed music for multiple film and television projects. They scored the soundtrack for Jake and Amir's web series, Lonely and Horny, released on Vimeo on April 8, 2016. In January 2017, the band scored Zoe Lister-Jones' directorial debut Band Aid, which premiered at the Sundance Film Festival. Lucius also wrote and performed an original song called "What's the Use in Crying?" in David Byrne's film Contemporary Color (2016).

In May 2022, Lucius performed "Dance Around It" on The Late Show with Stephen Colbert alongside Sheryl Crow and Brandi Carlile.

In addition to their three 2023 Grammy nominations for Album of The Year (In These Silent Days), Record of the Year ("You and Me on the Rock"), and Best Americana Performance ("You and Me on the Rock"), Lucius joined Brandi Carlile on the Grammy stage for a performance of "Broken Horses".

In 2024, Lucius appeared in season 1 of the children's television show Yo Gabba Gabbaland. They performed the song Silly in the Rain in episode 8, Silly.

== Other ==
Lucius have released music as part of tribute projects. The band covered "When The Night Comes Falling From The Sky" for the compilation album Bob Dylan In the 80s: Volume One and "Uncle John's Band" for the Grateful Dead 2016 compilation album Day of the Dead. In November 2018, Lucius contributed to a 7" vinyl series called the Fug Yep Soundation, launched in memory of the late Richard Swift. The series aims to raise awareness for addiction and "bring community to those suffering" by donating to musician-focused organizations MusiCares and Music Support UK.

In 2021, samples from the song Madness were featured in an installation with visual and sound artist Samuel Stubblefield, to be released in 2022.

== Reception ==
Lucius has been lauded by The New York Times for their "luscious, luminous, lilting lullabies", praised by NPR for their "charisma and charm," and described by Rolling Stone as "the best band you may not have heard yet."

The Guardian featured Lucius as its New Band Of The Day on February 14, 2014, and described them as "the missing link between Arcade Fire and Haim... How can they fail? They won't." Economist and New York Times columnist Paul Krugman is a noted fan of the band and has featured their music in his blog.

The two frontwomen are also known for their synchronous style that exudes an "idiosyncratic visual persona" in their choice of dress, stage set up, and performance. The two even shared the same hairdresser, although they have switched to identical wigs.

In December 2018, Lucius' album Nudes was named by Rolling Stone as one of "11 Great Albums You Probably Didn't Hear in 2018."

In 2022, Billboard regarded Second Nature as "Full of lush production that's complemented by the chilling harmonies of Jess Wolfe and Holly Laessig". Variety proclaims that, with Second Nature, Lucius is "no longer 20 feet or even a couple yards from stardom, but re-claiming the spotlight for themselves."

== Current members ==
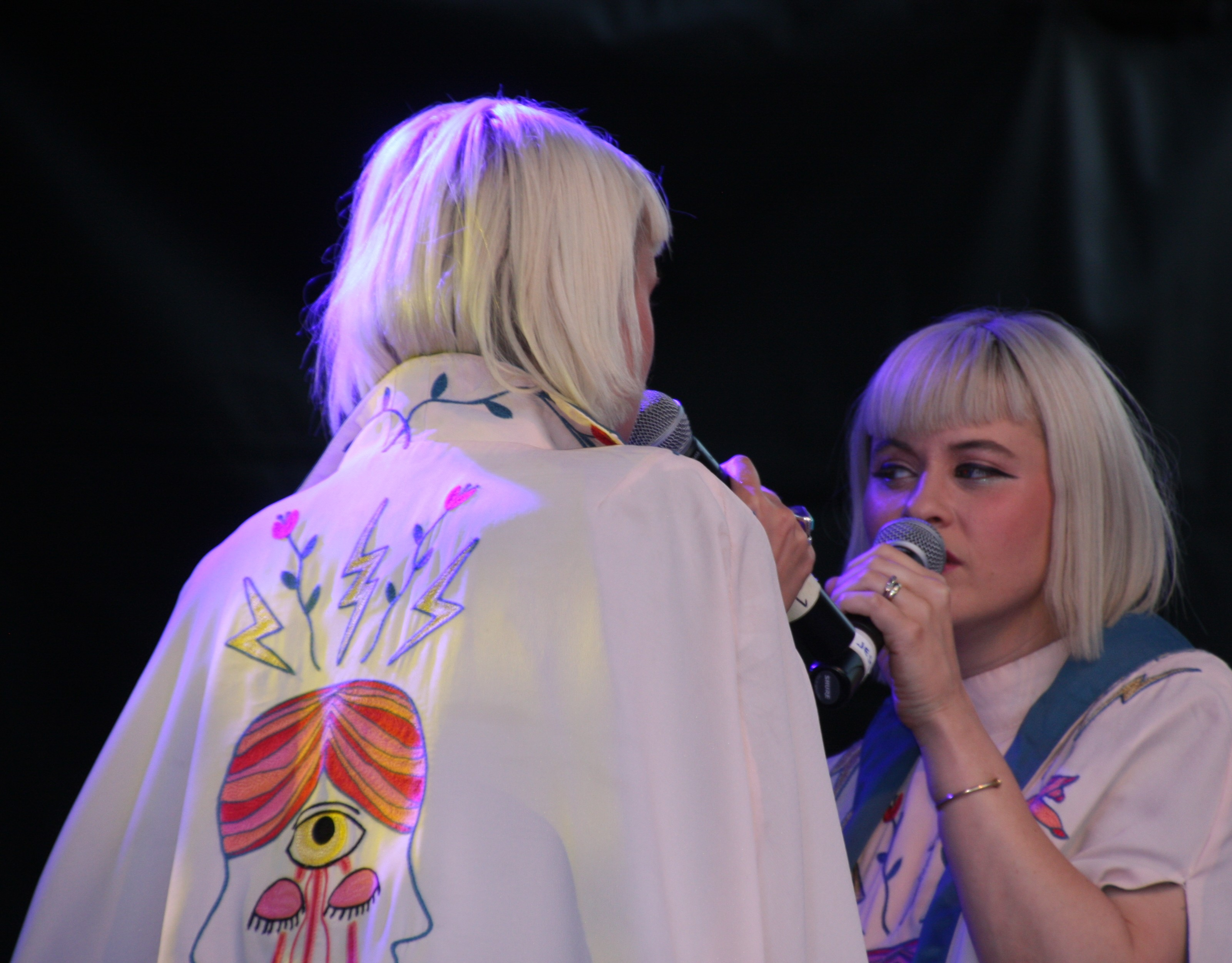
Jess Wolfe and Holly Laessig of Lucius performing in 2016

- Jess Wolfe – lead vocals, bass synth (2007–present)
- Holly Laessig – lead vocals, keyboard (2007–present)
- Dan Molad – drums, backing vocals, production (2010–present)
- Peter Lalish – guitar, backing vocals (2010–present)

Former touring members

- Andrew Burri – backing vocals, multi-instrumentalist (2011–2016)
- Josh Dion – drums
- Casey Foubert – guitar

Touring members

- Solomon Dorsey - bass, backing vocals
- Alex Pfender - guitar, keys, backing vocals
- Jacob Peters - guitar, backing vocals

== Discography ==
=== Albums ===
==== Studio albums ====
List of studio albums, with selected chart positions
Title	Details	Peak chart positions						
Title	Details	US	US Alt.	US Indie	US Rock	BEL (FL)	UK	UK Indie
Songs from the Bromley House	Released: November 13, 2009; Labels: Self-released	—	—	—	—	—	—	—
Wildewoman	Released: October 15, 2013; Labels: Mom + Pop, PIAS, Dine Alone	150	—	36	—	—	101	15
Good Grief	Released: March 11, 2016; Labels: Mom + Pop, PIAS, Dine Alone	92	13	6	15	161	—	31
Second Nature	Released: April 8, 2022; Label: Mom + Pop	— (Note: Second Nature did not enter the US Billboard 200, but peaked at number 28 on the US Top Album Sales Chart.)	—	—	—	—	— (Note: Second Nature did not enter the UK Albums Chart, but peaked at number 33 on the UK Record Store Chart.)	—
Lucius	Released: May 2, 2025; Labels: Fantasy	— (Note: Lucius did not enter the US Billboard 200, but peaked at number 48 on the US Top Album Sales Chart.)	—	—	—	—	—	—
"—" denotes a recording that did not chart or was not released in that territory.

==== Compilation albums ====
List of compilation albums, with selected chart positions
Title	Details	Peak chart positions	
Title	Details	US Sales	US Indie
Nudes	Released: March 2, 2018; Labels: Mom + Pop Music	76	12

=== EPs ===
Title	Release details
Lucius EP	Released: February 2012; Label: Wildewoman Music; Formats: Digital download, streaming

=== Singles ===
==== As lead artist ====
Single	Year	Peak chart positions						Album
Single	Year	US AAA	US Alt.	US Rock Air.	BEL (FL) Tip	SWI Air	UK Indie Break.	Album
"Hey Doreen"	2013	—	—	—	—	—	—	Wildewoman
"Tempest"	2013	—	—	—	—	—	—	Wildewoman
"Turn It Around"	2013	16	—	—	74	92	14	Wildewoman
"Don't Just Sit There"	2014	—	—	—	—	—	—	Wildewoman
"Born Again Teen"	2015	—	33	46	—	—	—	Good Grief
"Madness"	2016	—	—	—	—	—	—	Good Grief
"Something About You"	2016	—	—	—	—	—	—	Good Grief
"Dusty Trails"	2016	—	—	—	—	—	—	Good Grief
"What We Have (To Change)"	2016	—	—	—	—	—	—	Good Grief
"Pulling Teeth"	2016	—	—	—	—	—	—	Non-album single
"Million Dollar Secret"	2017	—	—	—	—	—	—	Nudes
"Until We Get There (Acoustic)"	2017	—	—	—	—	—	—	Nudes
"Neighbors"	2018	—	—	—	—	—	—	Nudes
"Right Down the Line"	2018	—	—	—	—	—	—	Nudes
"Eventually"	2018	—	—	—	—	—	—	Non-album single
"Next to Normal"	2022	5	—	39	—	—	—	Second Nature
"White Lies"	2022	—	—	—	—	—	—	Second Nature
"Dance Around It" (featuring Brandi Carlile and Sheryl Crow)	2022	31	—	—	—	—	—	Second Nature
"Stranger Danger"	2023	—	—	—	—	—	—	Lucius
"Old Tape" (featuring Adam Granduciel)	2024	12	—	—	—	—	—	Lucius
"Gold Rush"	2025	12	—	—	—	—	—	Lucius
"Impressions" (featuring Madison Cunningham)	2025	—	—	—	—	—	—	Lucius
"Joyride"	2025	—	—	—	—	—	—	Non-album single
"Thick as Thieves"	2025	—	—	—	—	—	—	Non-album single
"—" denotes a recording that did not chart or was not released in that territory.

==== As featured artist ====
Single	Year	Peak chart positions										Album
Single	Year	US AAA	US Alt.	US Rock	BEL (FL) Tip	CAN Rock	GER DL	ICE	NED Air	SWI Air	UK DL	Album
"Coolin' Out" (Nathaniel Rateliff featuring Lucius)	2018	—	—	—	13	—	—	—	—	—	—	Tearing at the Seams
"Back to Me" (Grace Potter featuring Lucius)	2020	28	—	—	—	—	—	—	—	—	—	Daylight
"Strangers" (Black Pumas featuring Lucius)	2021	—	—	—	—	—	—	—	—	—	—	Non-album single
"I Don't Live Here Anymore" (The War on Drugs featuring Lucius)	2021	1	16	43	—	38	77	39	24	79	95	I Don't Live Here Anymore
"Delicate Butterfly" (Jomoro featuring Lucius)	2021	—	—	—	—	—	—	—	—	—	—	Blue Marble Sky
"The Getting By II" (The Killers featuring Lucius)	2022	—	—	—	—	—	—	—	—	—	—	Pressure Machine
"You and Me on the Rock" (Brandi Carlile featuring Lucius)	2022	19	—	—	—	—	—	—	—	—	—	In These Silent Days
"—" denotes a recording that did not chart or was not released in that territory.
