= Lucius (album) =

Studio album by Lucius
- Released: May 2, 2025
- Studio: Altamira (Alhambra); Sounds Like a Fire (Pasadena)
- Length: 45:57
- Label: Wildewoman; Fantasy
- Producer: Dan Molad

Lucius chronology
Wildewoman (The New Recordings) (2024)	Lucius (2025)

Lucius is the fifth studio album by the American indie pop band Lucius. It was released on May 2, 2025, under the band's label Wildewoman Music and Fantasy Records. The album was produced by band member Dan Molad.

== Background ==
Lucius recorded the album in Los Angeles at the Altamira Sound studio and album producer Dan Molad's home studio Sounds Like a Fire. Of why the band decided to name the album eponymously, they said in a press release that the album's material was "raw and honest", further adding that "[the album] feels like coming home; something that resonates deeply in this moment of our lives. We are home in so many senses of the word; in the last couple of years we’ve started setting roots, finding life partners, building families, growing gardens. [...] We wrote songs about life and relationships. We recorded them in our home studios. We saw the beginnings and endings of life cycles while making this record, the beauty and fragility of the human experience. So it’s only fitting that this album is self-titled, it’s our story, who we are now and how we got here. Welcome to our living room."

The album features multiple collaborations, including with Madison Cunningham and Ethan Gruska on "Impressions", Dawes' Taylor Goldsmith on "Stranger Danger", and the War on Drugs' Adam Granduciel on "Old Tape".

== Promotion ==
The album's official lead single, "Gold Rush", was released on February 5, 2025, simultaneously with the album's announcement. Of the song, the band commented: "'Gold Rush' is that addictive sweetness to love. The roller coaster highs and lows. The sugary can’t get enough of you, can’t live with you feeling that keeps you coming back for more. It’s energy and grit: guitars wailing, heavy backbeat, dynamic vocals which flip from verse to chorus – mellow to strong – playing off the band and echoing the sentiment of the lyrics." The second single, "Impressions", was released on March 4, 2025. The band said about the creation process of the song: "We wrote 'Impressions' in Ethan Gruska’s home studio in Los Angeles. Together with [Madison Cunningham], we were exchanging ideas and feelings about the changes in our lives and how to reckon with them — the choice as to what to keep with you, and what to let go of, as we grow and evolve, and the questioning of yourself when you’re living a life you don’t recognize anymore." The third single, "Do It All for You", was released on April 4, 2025. The band self-described it as a "deeply romantic, in moments self-sacrificing, love letter about how far you would go and how much you would give for the person you love."

== Track listing ==
Lucius track listing
No.	Title	Writer(s)	Length
1.	"Final Days"	Jess Wolfe; Holly Laessig	4:42
2.	"Gold Rush"	Wolfe; Laessig; Dan Molad	4:15
3.	"Do It All for You"	Wolfe; Laessig; Molad	4:34
4.	"Mad Love"	Wolfe; Laessig; Molad; Peter Lalish	3:54
5.	"Stranger Danger"	Wolfe; Laessig; Molad	4:41
6.	"Hallways"	Wolfe; Laessig; Molad	3:47
7.	"Old Tape" (featuring Adam Granduciel)	Wolfe; Laessig; Molad; Oliver Hill	4:38
8.	"Impressions" (featuring Madison Cunningham)	Wolfe; Laessig; Madison Cunningham; Ethan Gruska	3:46
9.	"Borderline"	Wolfe; Laessig; Molad	3:46
10.	"Orange Blossoms"	Wolfe; Laessig	4:37
11.	"At the End of the Day"	Wolfe; Laessig; Molad	3:17
Total length:			45:57

== Personnel ==
Credits adapted from the album's liner notes.

=== Lucius ===
- Jess Wolfe – vocals (all tracks), Yamaha CS-50 (track 5)
- Holly Laessig – vocals (all tracks), Moog Matriarch (track 5), piano (6), Juno-106 (7)
- Dan Molad – production, engineering, mixing (all tracks); drums (tracks 1–3, 5–10), percussion (1–3, 5, 8, 9), Juno-106 (1, 3, 5–8), electric guitar (1, 5, 6, 8, 9), Moog Matriarch (1, 5, 7, 10), sampling (1, 6), vocals (3, 4, 7, 9, 10); Korg Poly Ensemble, tenor bass, Onde OM-1 (3); Mellotron (4, 6, 9), programming (5), acoustic guitar (7, 8, 10), bass (7, 9, 10), drum programming (7), Casio SK5 (10)
- Peter Lalish – acoustic guitars (tracks 1, 2, 4, 6, 7), electric guitars (1, 2, 5, 7–10), tenor bass (6), vocals (9), baritone guitars (10)

=== Additional musicians ===
- Robert Shelton – piano (tracks 1, 4, 10), Minimoog (2, 10), Hammond B3 (5), Korg Mono/Poly (9, 10); Korg Trident, Prophet-5 (10)
- Doug Stuart – bass (tracks 1, 4); electric bass, upright bass (3)
- Solomon Dorsey – bass (tracks 2, 5), electric bass (6); upright bass, fretless electric bass (8)
- Jacob Galenski – electric guitar, tambourine (track 2); acoustic guitars (9)
- Josh Mease – acoustic guitar (tracks 3, 5); bass, tenor bass (5)
- Luke Temple – electric guitar (3)
- Adrian Olsen – modular synthesizer (track 4)
- Taylor Goldsmith – piano, electric guitar (track 5)
- Adam Granduciel – electric guitar, vocals (track 7)
- Oliver Hill – piano, Prophet-6 (track 7)
- Madison Cunningham – electric guitar, vocals (track 8)
- Ethan Gruska – sampling (track 8)
- Alex Pfender – acoustic guitar (tracks 9, 10), vocals (10)
- Rob Moose – strings (track 10)
- Evan Smith – flutes (track 10)

=== Technical and visuals ===
- Robert Shelton – additional production, engineering
- Emily Lazar – mastering
- Alex Pfender – additional mixing, additional engineering (track 7); engineering assistance (3)
- Stella Hartmann – engineering assistance (track 3)
- Jack Davison – cover photo
- Dana Trippe – band photos
- Tika Buchanan – art direction, design
