= Second Nature (Lucius album) =

Studio album by Lucius
- Released: April 8, 2022
- Length: 38:04
- Label: Mom + Pop Music
- Producer: Dave Cobb; Brandi Carlile

Lucius chronology
Nudes (2018)	Second Nature (2022)	Wildewoman (The New Recordings) (2024)

Singles from Second Nature
- 1. "Next to Normal" Released: January 11, 2022; 2. "Dance Around It" Released: June 6, 2022

Second Nature is the fourth studio album by American indie pop band Lucius. It was released on April 8, 2022, by Mom + Pop Music. It is their first full-length studio album since Good Grief (2016). Second Nature was produced by Dave Cobb and Brandi Carlile.

== Background ==
Lucius' previous studio album Good Grief was released in March 2016, followed by a compilation album in 2018 titled Nudes which consisted of acoustic versions of previously released songs in addition to new material. The band initially worked on an album self-described by band member Holly Laessig as "super heady [and] super conceptual" before shelving it in favor of what would eventually become Second Nature.

Work for the album began shortly prior to lockdowns stemming from the COVID-19 pandemic with sessions beginning in Nashville, Tennessee that saw Lucius collaborate with outside writers for the first time such as Trent Dabbs and Lori McKenna. Sessions continued in Los Angeles virtually via Zoom before the band returned to Nashville for three weeks to complete the album at RCA Studios A.

On January 11, 2022, Lucius announced details about the album, revealing its title Second Nature and its release date of April 8, 2022 with production helmed by Dave Cobb and Brandi Carlile. In a press release, Lucius member Jess Wolfe stated that the album derived from the personal experiences of grief that she and the rest of the band experienced during the pandemic, further adding that the album's musical direction was intended for the band to "[dance their] way through the darkness".

== Singles ==
The album's lead single "Next to Normal" was released simultaneously with the album announcement on January 11, 2022. Three additional singles were released prior to the album's release: "White Lies", "Heartbursts", and "Dance Around It" on February 10, March 3, and March 17 of the same year, respectively.

== Critical reception ==
Professional ratings
Aggregate scores
Source	Rating
Metacritic	74/100
Review scores
Source	Rating
AllMusic	4/5 stars
American Songwriter	3/5 stars
DIY	3.5/4 stars
Pitchfork	6.7/10
Under the Radar	6.5/10 stars

Upon release, Second Nature received positive acclaim from critics. At Metacritic, which assigns a normalized rating out of 100 based on reviews from mainstream publications, the album has an average score of 74 based on seven reviews, indicating "generally favorable reviews".

== Track listing ==
No.	Title	Writer(s)	Length
1.	"Second Nature"	Holly Laessig; Jess Wolfe	3:31
2.	"Next to Normal"	Laessig; Wolfe; Trent Dabbs	3:11
3.	"24"	Laessig; Wolfe; Eli Teplin	4:15
4.	"Heartbursts"	Laessig; Wolfe; Teplin	3:56
5.	"Dance Around It" (featuring Brandi Carlile and Sheryl Crow)	Laessig; Wolfe; Jenn Decilveo	3:27
6.	"The Man I'll Never Find"	Laessig; Wolfe; Dabbs	4:02
7.	"Promises"	Laessig; Wolfe; Dabbs	3:59
8.	"LSD"	Laessig; Wolfe; Decilveo	3:40
9.	"Tears in Reverse"	Laessig; Wolfe; Dabbs; Lori McKenna	3:56
10.	"White Lies"	Laessig; Wolfe; Decilveo	4:07
Total length:			38:04

== Personnel ==
Credits for Second Nature adapted from Tidal.

=== Musicians ===
- Holly Laessig - composer, lyricist
- Jess Wolfe - composer, lyricist
- Brandi Carlile - additional vocals (5)
- Sheryl Crow - additional vocals (5)
- Jenn Decilveo - composer (5, 8, 10)
- Trent Dabbs - composer, lyricist (6–7, 9)
- Lori McKenna - composer, lyricist (9)

=== Technical ===
- Rob Kinelski - mixing (1–3, 6–8, 10)
- Dan Molad - mixing (4, 5, 9), engineering
- Randy Merrill - engineering, mastering
- Drew Long - engineering
- Greg Koller - engineering
- Brandon Bell - engineering
- Casey Cuayo - mixing engineering
- Eli Heister - mixing engineering
- Phillip Smith - assistant engineering
- Gabriel Cabezas - string engineering
- Rob Moose - string engineering
- Andrew Brightman - production manager
- Michael Goldstone - A&R
- Robert Beatty - artwork, design
- Holly Laessig - creative design
- Jon Conrad - creative design
- Jess Wolfe - creative director
- Sonia Gauvin - design
- Max Wanger - photography
