= Shawn Everett =

Canadian record producer

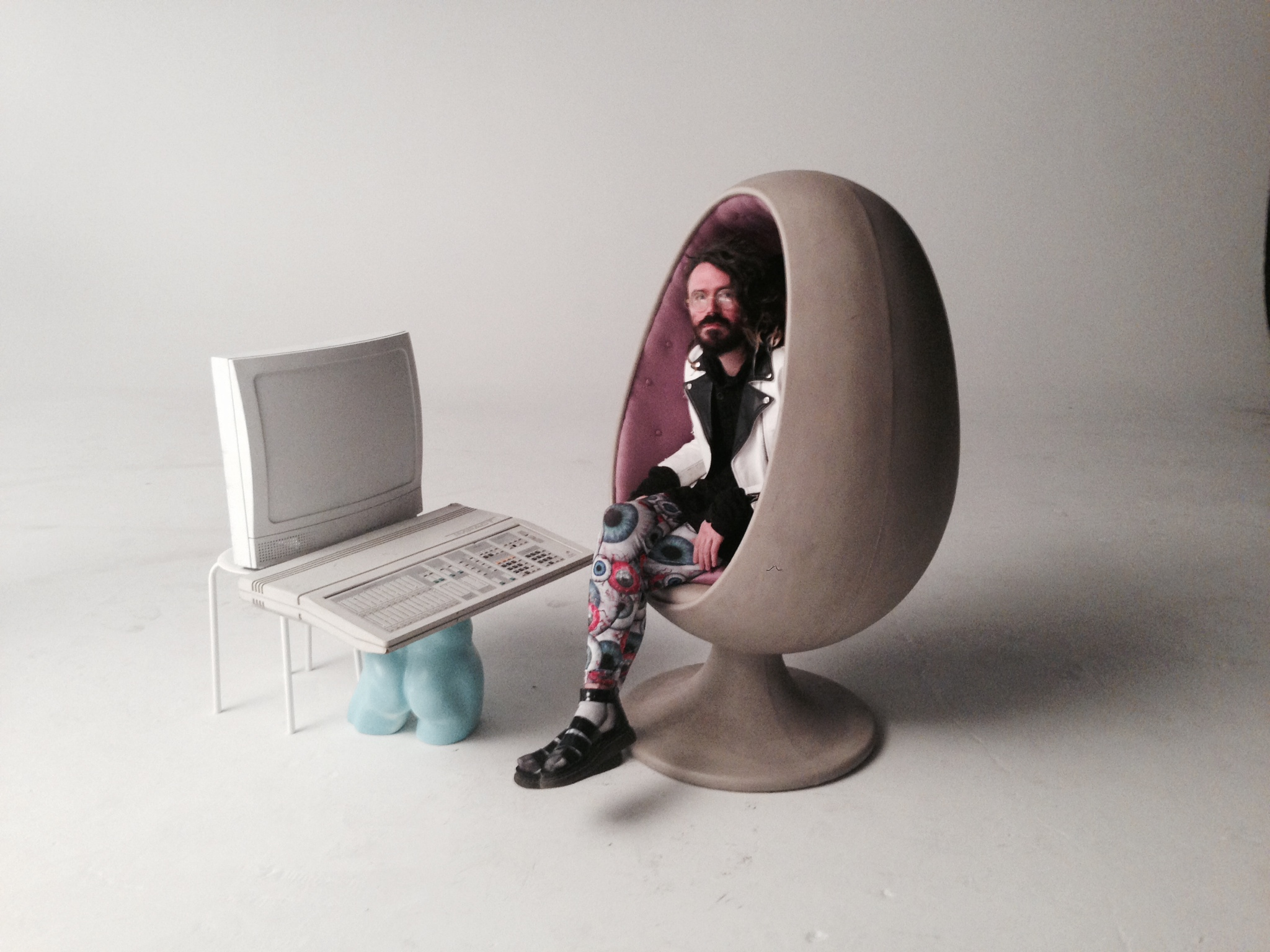
- Everett pictured on the set of Human Sadness

Background information
- Born: July 6, 1982 (age 44)
- Origin: Calgary, Alberta, Canada
- Genres: Rock, indie rock
- Occupations: Record producer, engineer
- Years active: 1996–present

Shawn Everett (born July 6, 1982) is a Canadian music engineer and producer best known for his work with Alabama Shakes, Kacey Musgraves, The War on Drugs, The Killers, and Julian Casablancas. Everett has won six Grammy Awards.

== Early life ==
Everett was born and raised in Bragg Creek, Alberta. After graduating high school, Everett was accepted as a Work-Study participant in the Audio program in Music & Sound at The Banff Centre. Everett relocated to Los Angeles in 2005 and began engineering for producer Tony Berg, former A&R Executive for Geffen Records and Virgin Music.

== Career ==
=== Julian Casablancas+The Voidz ===
Shawn served as the producer on Tyranny, the 2014 debut release from Julian Casablancas+The Voidz. He is featured in the "Can I VHS You?" video with the band and also appears in the video for "Human Sadness", which was directed by Warren Fu.

=== Recording approach ===
Everett has described treating engineering and mixing as part of a record's creative arrangement rather than only a technical stage. In a 2017 profile, he said he sometimes asks artists to "send me a picture of what you want the song to sound like" to guide his mixing decisions, and described using unconventional microphone setups — including a binaural head microphone inspired by Tchad Blake's work — and processing techniques such as running audio through a smartphone to shape a track's sound.

=== Awards and nominations ===
Shawn Everett has won six Grammy awards and five Juno awards.

In February 2016, Everett and mastering engineer Bob Ludwig won the "Best Engineered Album, Non-Classical" Grammy Award for their work on Sound & Color by Alabama Shakes. Everett won an additional Grammy for Best Alternative Music Album for Sound & Color.

In 2016 Everett won the Canadian Juno Awards for Recording Engineer of the Year for "Don't Wanna Fight", "Gimme All Your Love" from Sound & Color by Alabama Shakes.

In 2018 Everett was nominated for the "Best Engineered Album, Non-Classical" Grammy for his work on No Shape by Perfume Genius. He won a Grammy for "Best Rock Album" for his work on A Deeper Understanding by The War on Drugs.

In February 2018, Everett was nominated for Recording Engineer of the Year at the Canadian Juno awards for his work on A Deeper Understanding by The War on Drugs and No Shape by Perfume Genius.

In February 2019, Everett won Album of the Year and Best Country Album at the Grammys. Both awards were for his work mixing the album Golden Hour by Kacey Musgraves.

In March 2019, Everett won Recording Engineer of Year at the Canadian Juno awards for his work on Golden Hour by Kacey Musgraves.

In December 2020, Everett was nominated three times in the Best Engineered Album, Non-Classical category for his work on Devon Gilfillian's Black Hole Rainbow, Beck's Hyperspace, and Brittany Howard's Jaime. He was the second engineer to achieve a triple nomination in the category. The first was Ed Cherney whose work on Bonnie Raitt's "Longing in Their Hearts" won at the 1995 Grammys.

In March 2021, Everett won the "Best Engineered Album, Non-Classical" Grammy Award for his work on Hyperspace by Beck.

In November 2022, Everett was nominated for "Best Alternative Album" for his work on Cool It Down by Yeah Yeah Yeahs and "Album of the Year" for his work on 30 by Adele.

In March 2024, Everett won Producer of the Year and Recording Engineer at the Juno Awards for his work with Miley Cyrus and Brittany Howard.

In March 2026, Everett Recording Engineer at the Juno Awards.

== Credits ==
Year	Artist	Album	Credits
2006	Simon Dawes	Carnivore	engineer, mixing
2006	Pete Yorn	Nightcrawler	engineer, mixing
2006	Natalie Cole	Leavin’	engineer
2007	Jesca Hoop	Kismet	engineer, mixing
2007	Minnie Driver	Seastories	engineer, mixing
2008	Everlast	Love, War and the Ghost of Whitey Ford	engineer, mixing
2008	Kathy Griffin	For Your Consideration	editing
2008	Phantom Planet	Raise the Dead	engineer, mixing
2008	The Whispertown 2000	Swim	mixing
2009	Pete Yorn	Back & Fourth	assistant engineer, audio engineer
2009	Ohbijou	Beacons	engineer, mixing
2009	Farmer Dave Scher	Flash Forward to the Good Times	tech assistance
2009	Bruce Hornsby	Levitate	engineer, mixing
2009	Weezer	Raditude	engineer, producer
2009	Bob Dylan, P!nk, Jackson Browne, Randy Newman, Eddie Vedder	The People Speak	engineer, mixing
2009	Jakob Dylan, Dhani Harrison	War Child Presents Heroes, Vol. 1	engineer, mastering, mixing, producer
2009	thenewno2	You Are Here	engineer
2010	Weezer	Death to False Metal	engineer, mixing, producer
2010	Ozomatli	Fire Away	engineer, mixing
2010	Jesca Hoop	Hunting My Dress	artwork, engineer, mixing
2010	Weezer	Hurley	engineer, mixing, producer
1996	Weezer	Pinkerton (Deluxe edition bonus tracks only)	engineer, mixing
2010	Various artists	Raise Hope for Congo	engineer
2010	k.d. lang	Recollection	engineer
2010	The Like	Release Me	engineer, mixing
2010	Elizabeth & the Catapult	The Other Side of Zero	engineer, mixing, vocals
2010	Blake Mills	Break Mirrors	engineer, mixing
2011	John Gold	A Flower in Your Head	mixing
2011	Michael Giacchino	Cars 2 (Original Motion Picture Soundtrack)	engineer, producer
2011	Various artists	Muppets: The Green Album	engineer
2011	Charlie Winston	Running Still	drums, engineer, mixing, percussion, programming
2011	Medi	You Got Me (Moving)	engineer, mixing
2012	Various artists	Disney Pixar All Time Favorites	producer
2012	Greg Holden	I Don't Believe You	drum loop, engineer, mixing
2012	Haim, Billy Gibbons	Just Tell Me That You Want Me: A Tribute to Fleetwood Mac	engineer
2012	JJAMZ	Suicide Pact	additional production, engineer, mixing
2012	Sara Watkins	Sun Midnight Sun	engineer, mixing, mastering
2012	Jesca Hoop	The House That Jack Built	producer, engineer, mixing, mastering, contribution
2013	Har Mar Superstar	Bye Bye 17	additional production, mixing, mastering
2013	Papa	Tender Madness	mixing
2013	Lucius	Wildewoman	engineer, mixing
2014	Minnie Driver	Ask Me to Dance	mastering, mixing
2014	Weezer	Everything Will Be Alright in the End	additional production, engineer
2014	Leighton Meester	Heartstrings	engineer
2014	The Belle Brigade	Just Because	producer, arranger, engineer
2014	Nicholas Krgovich	On Sunset	engineer
2014	Julian Casablancas+The Voidz	Tyranny	producer, engineer, mixing
2015	Laila Biali	House of Many Rooms	mixing
2015	Alabama Shakes	Sound & Color	engineer, mixing
2015	Rey Pila	The Future Sugar	producer, mixing
2016	Pete Yorn	Arranging Time	mixing
2016	Har Mar Superstar	Best Summer Ever	engineer, mixing, instrumentation
2016	Holy Fuck	Congrats	engineer
2016	Local Natives	Sunlit Youth	engineer, mixing
2016	Lucius	Good Grief	producer
2016	The Darcys	Centerfold	producer, engineer
2016	Margaret Glaspy	Emotions and Math	mixing
2016	Big Smoke	Time is Golden	mixing
2016	The Growlers	City Club	producer, mixing, engineer
2016	Warpaint	Heads Up	mixing
2016	John Legend	Darkness and Light	engineer, mixing
2017	Perfume Genius	No Shape	engineer, mixing
2017	Benjamin Booker	Witness	mixing
2017	Broken Social Scene	Hug of Thunder	mixing
2017	Grizzly Bear	Painted Ruins	mixing
2017	The War on Drugs	A Deeper Understanding	engineering, mixing
2017	The Killers	Wonderful Wonderful	mixing
2017	Kesha	Rainbow	mixing
2017	Mike Gordon	OGOGO	engineering, mixing, producer
2018	The Voidz	Virtue	engineering, mixing, producer
2018	Hinds	I Don't Run	mixing
2018	King Tuff	The Other	mixing
2018	Okkervil River	In the Rainbow Rain	mixing
2018	Kacey Musgraves	Golden Hour	mixing
2018	Houndmouth	Golden Age	mixing, engineering, producer
2018	TT	LoveLaws	mixing
2018	Kurt Vile	Bottle It In	mixing, engineering, producer
2018	Jim James	Uniform Clarity	mixing, engineering, producer
2018	Emma Louise	Lilac Everything	mixing
2019	Jenny Lewis	On the Line	mixing, producer
2019	Foxygen	Seeing Other People	mixing, engineering
2019	Hozier	Wasteland, Baby!	mixing
2019	Local Natives	Violet Street	mixing, engineering, producer
2019	Vampire Weekend	Father of the Bride	mixing, engineering
2019	Clairo	Immunity	mixing
2019	Brittany Howard	Jaime	mixing, engineering, mastering
2019	Haim	"Summer Girl"	mixing
2019	Kim Gordon	No Home Record	producer
2019	Beck	Hyperspace	mixing
2019	Devon Gilfillian	Black Hole Rainbow	producer, mixing, engineering
2020	King Princess	"Ohio"	producer
2020	The Killers	Imploding the Mirage	producer, mixing, engineering, writing
2020	Chicano Batman	Invisible People	mixing
2020	Haim	Women in Music Pt. III	mixing
2020	Orville Peck	Show Pony	mixing
2020	King Princess	Pain	producer, mixing, engineering, writing
2020	Cold War Kids	New Age Norms 2	producer, mixing, engineering
2020	SZA	"Good Days"	mixing
2021	Iceage	Seek Shelter	mixing
2021	Lucy Dacus	Home Video	mixing
2021	The Killers	Pressure Machine	producer, mixing, engineering
2021	The War on Drugs	I Don't Live Here Anymore	producer, mixing, engineering
2021	Phoebe Bridgers	"Nothing Else Matters"	mixing
2021	Big Thief	"Little Things"	mixing, engineering, additional production
2021	Kacey Musgraves	Star-Crossed	mixing
2021	Big Thief	Dragon New Warm Mountain I Believe in You	mixing, engineering, additional production
2021	Adele	30	engineering, producer
2022	Belle and Sebastian	A Bit of Previous	engineering, producer, mixing
2022	Lykke Li	Eyeye	mixing
2022	Carly Rae Jepsen	"Western Wind"	mixing
2022	King Princess	Hold On Baby	mixing, producer
2022	Yeah Yeah Yeahs	Cool It Down	mixing
2022	Leon Bridges, Kevin Kaarl	"Summer Moon"	mixing
2022	Alvvays	Blue Rev	producer, recording, mixing, mastering
2022	SZA	SOS	mixing, mastering
2023	Ryan Beatty	Calico	mixing
2023	Anjimile	The King	producer, recording, mixing
2023	Corinne Bailey Rae	Black Rainbows	mixing
2023	Slowdive	Everything Is Alive	mixing
2023	Hozier	Unreal Unearth	mixing
2023	Miley Cyrus	"Used to Be Young"	producer, recording, mixing
2023	Miley Cyrus	Endless Summer Vacation	producer, recording, mixing
2023	The Killers	"Your Side of Town"	producer, recording
2023	Black Pumas	Chronicles of a Diamond	mixing
2023	Kesha	"The Drama"	writing
2024	Chelsea Wolfe	She Reaches Out to She Reaches Out to She	mixing
2024	Maggie Rogers	Don't Forget Me	mixing
2024	Kacey Musgraves	Deeper Well	mixing
2024	Brittany Howard	What Now	producer, recording, mixing, mastering
2024	Remi Wolf	Big Ideas	mixing
2024	Conan Gray	Found Heaven	producer, recording, mixing
2024	Fabiana Palladino	Fabiana Palladino	mixing
2024	Beyonce	Cowboy Carter	producer, additional mixing
2025	Miley Cyrus	Something Beautiful	executive producer, producer, recording, mixing, co-writer, mastering
2025	Bon Iver	SABLE, fABLE	mixing
2025	Tyler Childers	Snipe Hunter	mixing
2025	sombr	I Barely Know Her	mixing, mastering
2025	Tobias Jesso Jr	shine	mixing, mastering, drum production
2026	Royel Otis	"Sweet Hallelujah"	producer, recording, mixing, co-writer, mastering
2026	Brandon Flowers	Thrasher	producer, recording, mixing, mastering
2026	Alabama Shakes	I Must Be Dreaming	producer, recording, mixing
2026	Miley Cyrus	Bass Persuades	mixing
2026	U2	Carnaval De Luz	mixing
2026	Grimes	Psyopera	mixing
2026	Lisa (rapper)	Leave With Me	mixing
