= Invisible People (album) =

Studio album by Chicano Batman
- Released: May 1, 2020
- Length: 39:29
- Label: ATO
- Producer: Leon Michels

Chicano Batman chronology
Freedom Is Free (2017)	Invisible People (2020)

Invisible People is the fourth studio album by American band Chicano Batman. It was released on May 1, 2020, under ATO Records.

== Critical reception ==
Professional ratings
Aggregate scores
Source	Rating
Metacritic	68/100
Review scores
Source	Rating
AllMusic	3.5/5 stars
Pitchfork	7.4/10
Under the Radar	7/10

Invisible People received generally favorable reviews from music critics. At Metacritic, which assigns a weighted average rating out of 100 to reviews from mainstream publications, the album received an average score of 68, based on five reviews.

Critics noted that the album has a different sound than the band's earlier work. Allie Gregory from Exclaim! wrote that the band mixed their usual funk and soul style with a modern sound. She stated that the album relies less on nostalgia than their previous records.

Shawn Donohue from Glide Magazine discussed the production by Leon Michels and Shawn Everett. He said the album has a cleaner, "modern pop" sound. Donohue praised upbeat songs like "Color My Life" and "Blank Slate" but felt that other tracks, such as "Moment of Joy," lost the gritty feel of the band's past music due to the polished production. However, Exclaim! highlighted the single "Pink Elephant" as a strong example of the band keeping their R&B style.

== Track listing ==
Invisible People track listing
No.	Title	Length
1.	"Color My Life"	3:28
2.	"Blank Slate"	3:00
3.	"I Know It"	2:31
4.	"Invisible People"	3:47
5.	"Manuel's Story"	2:56
6.	"Moment of Joy"	3:37
7.	"Pink Elephant"	3:12
8.	"Polymetronomic Harmony"	3:17
9.	"The Way"	3:48
10.	"The Prophet"	3:01
11.	"Bella"	2:58
12.	"Wounds"	3:54

== Personnel ==
- Shawn Everett – engineer
- Leon Michels – producer

== Charts ==
Chart performance for Invisible People
Chart (2020)	Peak position
US Top Album Sales (Billboard)	54
US Heatseekers Albums (Billboard)	12
