= Darkness and Light (John Legend album) =

Studio album by John Legend
- Released: December 2, 2016
- Studio: East West Studio 2 in Los Angeles
- Genre: R&B
- Length: 45:50
- Label: GOOD; Columbia
- Producer: Blake Mills; John Legend; John Ryan

John Legend chronology
Love in the Future (2013)	Darkness and Light (2016)	A Legendary Christmas (2018)

Singles from Darkness and Light
- 1. "Love Me Now" Released: October 7, 2016; 2. "Penthouse Floor" Released: November 18, 2016; 3. "Surefire" Released: March 27, 2017

Darkness and Light is the sixth studio album by American singer, songwriter, and pianist John Legend. It was released on December 2, 2016, by Columbia Records, as well as his last album to be released with GOOD Music, following the end of his five-album contract with the label.

== Recording and production ==
Legend recorded the album at East West Studio 2 in Los Angeles. It was produced almost entirely by Blake Mills, who also played various instruments and co-produced most of the songs. Legend also collaborated with rapper Chance the Rapper, and vocalists Brittany Howard and Miguel.

== Singles ==
The album's lead single "Love Me Now" was released on October 7, 2016. On October 6, 2016, the music video was released for the single. On November 18, 2016, the album's second single "Penthouse Floor" featuring Chance the Rapper, was released. On November 25, 2016, the album's first promotional single "I Know Better", was released and on March 27, 2017, was announced that the album's third single is "Surefire".

== Commercial performance ==
In the United States, Darkness and Light debuted at number 14 on the Billboard 200, with 38,000 album-equivalent units, marking the sixth highest debut of the week. The album selling 26,000 copies in its first week. The album was also streamed 12.5 million times in the first week.

== Critical reception ==
Darkness and Light was met with generally positive reviews. At Metacritic, which assigns a normalized rating out of 100 to reviews from mainstream critics, the album received an average score of 76, based on 10 reviews.

Reviewing the album in The New York Times, Jon Pareles applauded its treatment of love as a multi-dimensional theme and "as something far more complex than a panacea and a fount of perpetual reassurance, with music to match". Writing for Vice, Robert Christgau cited the title track, "Marching Into the Dark", and "I Know Better" as highlights and said the lyric from the latter song ("My history has brought me to this place/This power and the color of my face") is "not an easy brag to bring off modestly, and the more I listen the more I appreciate the trick".

== Track listing ==
All tracks produced by Blake Mills, except where noted.

Standard edition
No.	Title	Writer(s)	Length
1.	"I Know Better"	John Stephens; Will Oldham	3:03
2.	"Penthouse Floor" (featuring Chance the Rapper and produced with Greg Kurstin)	Stephens; Chancellor Bennett	4:43
3.	"Darkness and Light" (featuring Brittany Howard and produced with John Ryan)	Stephens; Oldham	3:50
4.	"Overload" (featuring Miguel)	Stephens; Miguel Pimentel	3:20
5.	"Love Me Now" (produced with Ryan)	Stephens	3:30
6.	"What You Do to Me" (produced with Matt Sweeney and Michael Tucker)	Stephens; Julia Michaels; Justin Tranter	3:21
7.	"Surefire" (produced with Ludwig Göransson)	Stephens; Oldham; Michaels	4:03
8.	"Right by You" (For Luna)	Stephens; Ethan Gruska	4:16
9.	"Temporarily Painless" (produced with Ryan)	Stephens	3:55
10.	"How Can I Blame You" (produced with Sweeney)	Stephens; Francis White	3:56
11.	"Same Old Story"	Stephens; Tobias Jesso Jr.	3:32
12.	"Marching into the Dark"	Stephens; Jesso Jr.	4:21
Total length:			45:50

Deluxe edition and Target exclusive (bonus tracks)
No.	Title	Writer(s)	Length
13.	"Drawing Lines"	Stephens; Oldham	2:21
14.	"What You Do to Me" (piano demo; produced by John Legend)	Stephens; Michaels; Tranter	3:41
15.	"Love You Anyway" (produced with Sweeney and Tyler Johnson)	Stephens; Michaels; Tranter	3:36
Total length:			55:28

Notes

- "What You Do to Me", "Surefire", "Marching Into the Dark", and "Love You Anyway" features background vocals by Jessy Wilson.
- "What You Do to Me" and "Surefire" features background vocals by Holly Laessig and Jess Wolfe.
- "Temporarily Painless" and "How Can I Blame You" features background vocals by Z Berg.
- "Temporarily Painless" features background vocals by Perfume Genius.
- "Drawing Lines" features background vocals by Moses Sumney.

== Charts ==
=== Weekly charts ===
Chart (2016–17)	Peak position
Australian Albums (ARIA)	37
Belgian Albums (Ultratop Flanders)	75
Belgian Albums (Ultratop Wallonia)	167
Canadian Albums (Billboard)	29
Dutch Albums (Album Top 100)	21
French Albums (SNEP)	123
Irish Albums (IRMA)	61
Italian Albums (FIMI)	49
New Zealand Heatseekers Albums (RMNZ)	1
Scottish Albums (OCC)	50
Swiss Albums (Schweizer Hitparade)	32
UK Albums (OCC)	35
UK R&B Albums (OCC)	3
US Billboard 200	14
US Top R&B/Hip-Hop Albums (Billboard)	5

=== Year-end charts ===
Chart (2017)	Position
US Billboard 200	189
US Top R&B/Hip-Hop Albums (Billboard)	84

== Certifications ==
Region	Certification	Certified units/sales
Canada (Music Canada)	Gold	40,000^{‡}
^{‡} Sales+streaming figures based on certification alone.
