= Chicano Batman =

American psychedelic rock band

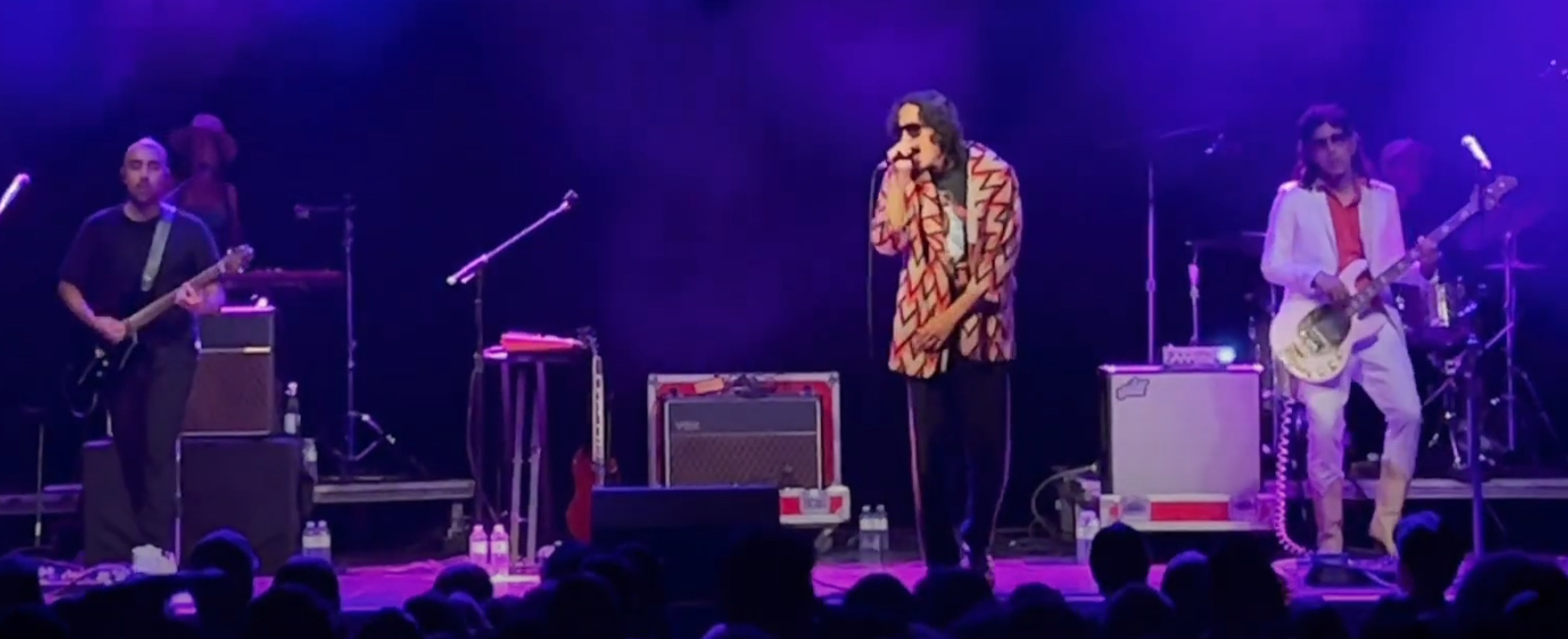
- Chicano Batman performing in 2022

Background information
- Origin: Los Angeles, California, US
- Genres: Psychedelic soul
- Years active: 2008–2024
- Labels: ATO
- Members: Eduardo Arenas; Carlos Arévalo; Bardo Martinez
- Website: chicanobatman.com

Chicano Batman was an American psychedelic rock band based in Los Angeles, California. Formed in 2008, the band was composed of Eduardo Arenas (bass, guitar, vocals), Carlos Arévalo (guitars, keyboards), and Bardo Martinez (lead vocals, keyboards, guitar). Currently, the band's drummer, Gabriel Villa, has not been active in the group since their last studio album, Invisible People. The group's sound draws from a mix of genres ranging from psychedelic soul, funk, indie/alternative, prog, and latin rock.

The band is currently on an indefinite hiatus.

== History ==
Chicano Batman was formed in 2008. NPR's Alt.Latino referred to the band's music as one of the show's and listeners' favorites of 2014. Chicano Batman provided support for select dates on the January–February leg of Jack White's Lazaretto Tour 2015. In April 2015, the band performed on Day 3 (April 12 & 19) for both weekends of the Coachella Valley Music and Arts Festival. In July 2015, Chicano Batman performed at Ruido Fest. As of 2017, the band has played at Bonnaroo (2016) and LouFest (2016), as well as both weekends of Coachella (2017), Sasquatch! Music Festival (2017), the Forecastle Festival (2017), FYF (2017), Beer X (2017), and Coachella (2022).

Chicano Batman made their late night television debut on Conan in 2017.

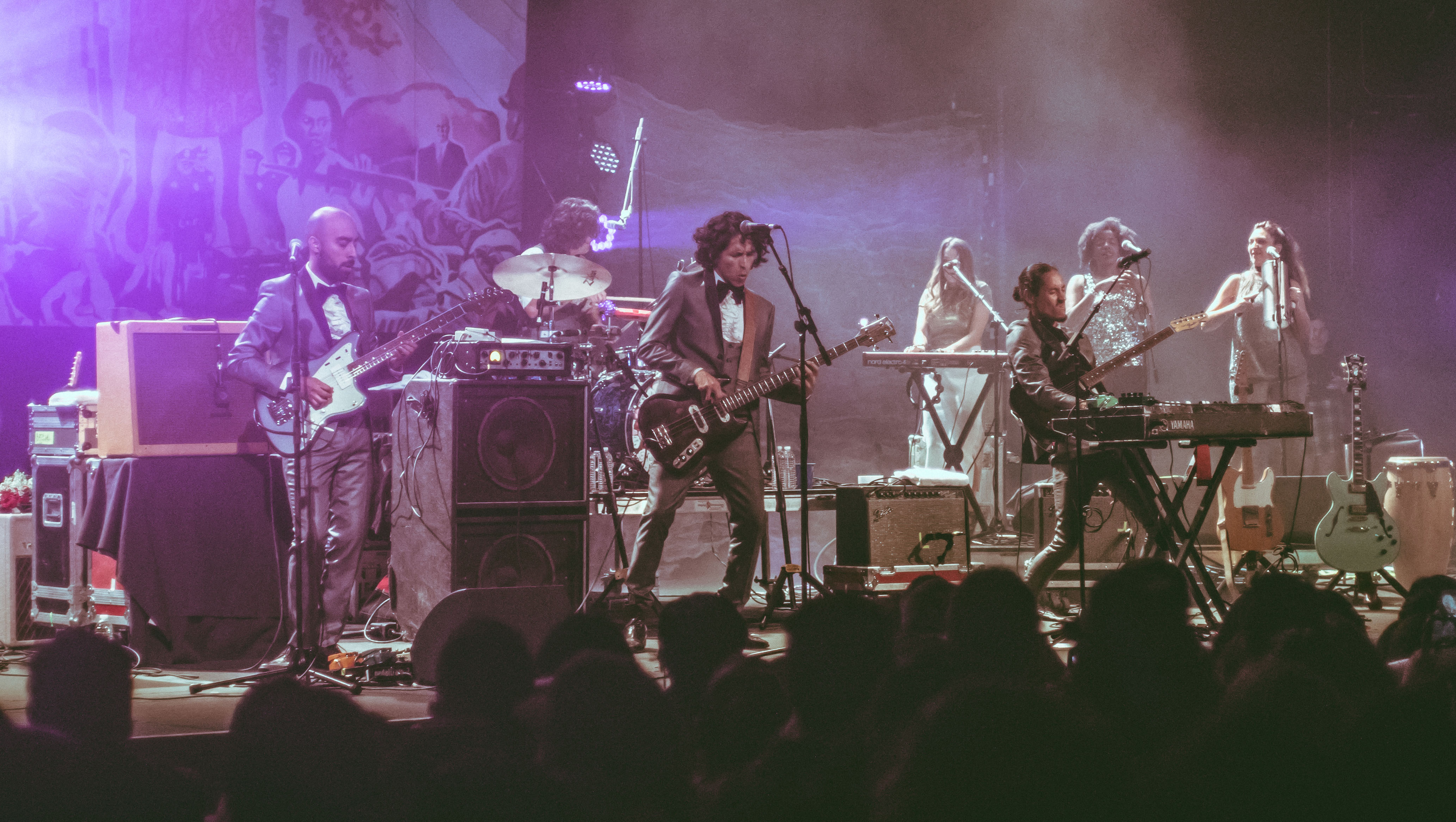
Chicano Batman performing in 2017

They star in a 2017 commercial for Johnnie Walker Scotch whisky, singing "This Land is Your Land".

Their music is played in the 2016 film Lowriders.

The band's follow-up to 2017's Freedom Is Free, titled Invisible People, arrived on May 1, 2020, via ATO Records. The new album was a collaboration with engineer Shawn Everett and producer Leon Michels. The announcement coincided with the release of "Color My Life".

In 2026, he is the guest star from the children's television in Yo Gabba Gabbaland in Season 2, and performed the song, We Can Help Each Other.

== Musical influences ==
In interviews, guitarist Carlos Arévalo notes band members' bonding over iconic Mexican rock band Cafe Tacvba, 1960s Brazilian artists Caetano Veloso and Tropicália music. The band's signature funky style can be attributed to their musical influences including the Beatles and Black soul musicians Curtis Mayfield and the Delfonics.

== Members ==
- Eduardo Arenas – bass guitar, guitar, vocals
- Carlos Arévalo – guitar, keyboard, synthesizer
- Bardo Martinez – lead vocals, keyboard, synthesizer, guitar
- Gabriel Villa – drums, percussion

== Discography ==
=== Albums ===
- Chicano Batman (2010)
- Cycles of Existential Rhyme (2014)
- Freedom Is Free (2017)
- Invisible People (2020)
- Notebook Fantasy (2024)

=== EPs ===
- Black Lipstick (2019)

=== Singles and EPs ===
- "Joven Navegante" (2012)
- "Magma" (2013)
- "Black Lipstick" (2015)
- "Please Don't Leave Me" (2016)
- This Land Is Your Land" (2017)
- "Háblame/Corazón de Roca" with Caloncho (2019)
