= Jess Wolfe =

American singer-songwriter

Jessica Wolfe
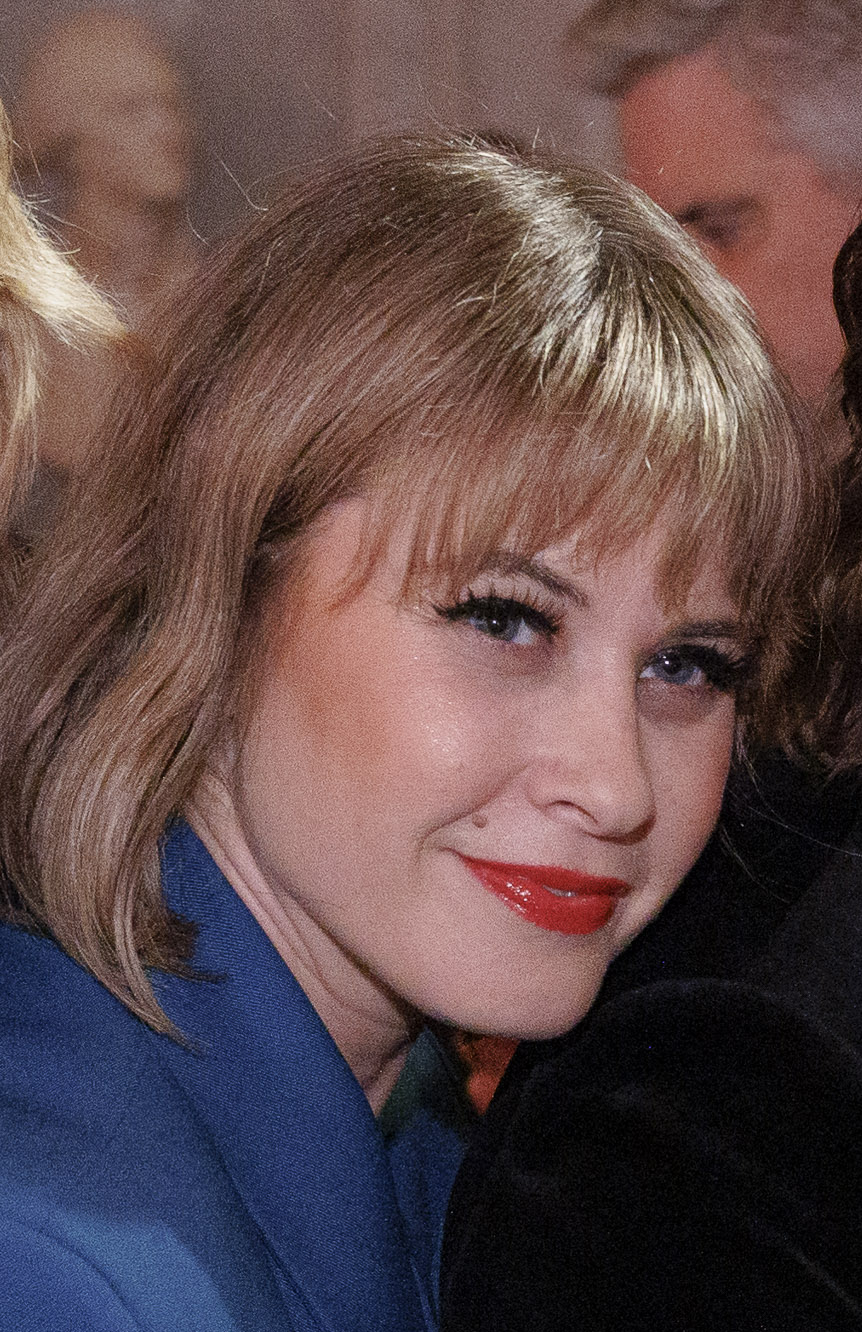
- Jess Wolfe in 2023

Background information
- Also known as: Jess Wolfe
- Born: Los Angeles, California, United States
- Origin: Los Angeles
- Genres: Indie pop
- Occupation(s): singer, songwriter, actress
- Instrument(s): vocals, bass synth
- Years active: 2005–present

Jessica Wolfe is an American singer, songwriter, bass synth player and actress from Los Angeles, California. She is a founding member along with Holly Laessig of the indie pop musical group Lucius.

== Life and early career ==
Jessica Wolfe was raised in Calabasas, California, and is a graduate of Calabasas High School. She studied at the Berklee College of Music, where she met future Lucius bandmate Holly Laessig. She graduated with the class of 2007, and subsequently moved to Brooklyn. She then toured with Roger Waters as a backup singer on his Us + Them Tour. Wolfe would also appear as a contestant on the ninth season of American Idol, with her audition airing but being eliminated in the Hollywood rounds thereafter.

== Music career ==
Wolfe and musical partner Holly Laessig founded Lucius upon moving to Brooklyn. The band has since released two EPs, four albums, and have collaborated on numerous songs with other musical artists.

== Personal life ==
Wolfe was previously married to Lucius's drummer, Dan Molad, but they divorced ahead of the Second Nature album tour.

== Discography ==
with Lucius

- Songs From The Bromley House (2009)
- Wildewoman (2013)
- Good Grief (2016)
- Nudes (2018)
- Second Nature (2022)
- Lucius (self-titled) (2025)

with Brandi Carlile

- In These Silent Days (2021)

== Awards and nominations ==
Award / Organization	Year	Category	Nominated work	Result
Grammy Awards	2023	Grammy Award for Album of the Year	In These Silent Days - Brandi Carlile	Nominated
Grammy Awards	2023	Grammy Award for Record of the Year	You and Me on the Rock - Brandi Carlile ft. Lucius	Nominated
Grammy Awards	2023	Grammy Award for Best Americana Performance	You and Me on the Rock - Brandi Carlile ft. Lucius	Nominated
