= Love Me Now (John Legend song) =

Single by John Legend

from the album Darkness and Light
- Released: October 7, 2016
- Recorded: 2016
- Genre: Soul; dancehall; pop
- Length: 3:30
- Label: GOOD; Columbia
- Songwriters: John Stephens; Blake Mills; John Ryan
- Producers: Mills; Ryan

John Legend singles chronology
"Summer Nights" (2016)	"Love Me Now" (2016)	"Penthouse Floor" (2016)

Music video
- "Love Me Now" on YouTube

"Love Me Now" is a song by American singer John Legend. It serves as the lead single from his fifth studio album Darkness and Light, and was released on October 7, 2016, by GOOD Music and Columbia Records. The song was produced by Blake Mills and John Ryan.

== Music video ==
On October 6, 2016, Legend uploaded the music video for "Love Me Now" on his YouTube and Vevo account. The music video is directed by Nabil Elderkin and depicts couples from various cultures expressing their love to each other. It also features Legend with his wife Chrissy Teigen and daughter Luna Simone Stephens.

== Live performances ==
In October 2016, Legend performed the song at The Ellen DeGeneres Show and The X Factor (UK). He also performed the song at the American Music Awards of 2016 and the season 11 finale of The Voice with contestant Wé McDonald.

== Commercial performance ==
"Love Me Now" debuted at number 55 on the Billboard Hot 100 chart dated October 19, 2016. Its debut was driven mostly by digital download sales, with 35,000 copies sold in its first week.

== Charts ==
=== Weekly charts ===
Chart (2016–2017)	Peak position
Australia (ARIA)	25
Austria (Ö3 Austria Top 40)	39
Belgium (Ultratop 50 Flanders)	19
Belgium Urban (Ultratop Flanders)	4
Belgium (Ultratop 50 Wallonia)	13
Canada Hot 100 (Billboard)	18
Canada AC (Billboard)	46
Canada Hot AC (Billboard)	48
Czech Republic Singles Digital (ČNS IFPI)	30
France (SNEP)	56
Germany (GfK)	28
Hungary (Rádiós Top 40)	26
Hungary (Single Top 40)	35
Ireland (IRMA)	17
Italy (FIMI)	36
Lebanon (Lebanese Top 20)	16
Netherlands (Dutch Top 40)	10
Netherlands (Single Top 100)	13
New Zealand (Recorded Music NZ)	21
Portugal (AFP)	13
Scottish Singles Sales (Official Charts)	9
Serbia (Radiomonitor)	3
Slovakia Airplay (ČNS IFPI)	96
Slovakia Singles Digital (ČNS IFPI)	33
Slovenia (SloTop50)	50
Sweden (Sverigetopplistan)	55
Switzerland (Schweizer Hitparade)	14
UK Singles (Official Charts)	17
UK Hip Hop/R&B (Official Charts)	3
US Billboard Hot 100	23
US Adult Contemporary (Billboard)	16
US Adult Pop Airplay (Billboard)	13
US Adult R&B Songs (Billboard)	9
US Dance Club Songs (Billboard)	20
US Hot R&B/Hip-Hop Songs (Billboard)	10
US Pop Airplay (Billboard)	19
US Rhythmic Airplay (Billboard)	20

=== Year-end charts ===
Chart (2017)	Position
Belgium (Ultratop Wallonia)	64
Canada (Canadian Hot 100)	77
Netherlands (Dutch Top 40)	58
Portugal (AFP)	87
Switzerland (Schweizer Hitparade)	86
US Adult Contemporary (Billboard)	48
US Adult Top 40 (Billboard)	44
US Hot R&B/Hip-Hop Songs (Billboard)	57

== Certifications ==
Region	Certification	Certified units/sales
Australia (ARIA)	3× Platinum	210,000^{‡}
Belgium (BRMA)	Gold	10,000^{‡}
Canada (Music Canada)	3× Platinum	240,000^{‡}
Denmark (IFPI Danmark)	Gold	45,000^{‡}
France (SNEP)	Gold	66,666^{‡}
Germany (BVMI)	Gold	200,000^{‡}
Italy (FIMI)	Platinum	50,000^{‡}
Mexico (AMPROFON)	Gold	30,000^{‡}
Netherlands (NVPI)	2× Platinum	80,000^{‡}
New Zealand (RMNZ)	2× Platinum	60,000^{‡}
Sweden (GLF)	Gold	20,000^{‡}
Switzerland (IFPI Switzerland)	Gold	15,000^{‡}
United Kingdom (BPI)	Platinum	600,000^{‡}
United States (RIAA)	2× Platinum	2,000,000^{‡}
^{‡} Sales+streaming figures based on certification alone.

== Release history ==
Region	Date	Format	Label	Ref.
United States	October 7, 2016	Digital download; streaming	Columbia	
