= Good Grief (Lucius album) =

Studio album by Lucius
- Released: March 11, 2016
- Genre: Indie pop
- Length: 44:46
- Labels: PIAS, Mom + Pop, Dine Alone
- Producers: Lucius, Shawn Everett, and Bob Ezrin

Lucius chronology
| Wildewoman (2013) | Good Grief (2016) | Second Nature (2022) |

Good Grief is the third studio album by Brooklyn indie pop band Lucius. Released on PIAS Recordings, Mom + Pop Music and Dine Alone Records, their second album peaked at number 92 on the Billboard 200 chart. In 2020, Lucius released an expanded edition with bonus and demos tracks including covers of Ian & Sylvia's "You Were on My Mind", David Bowie's "Let's Dance", and The Kinks's "Strangers".

== Critical reception ==
The album received positive reviews from critics; according to Metacritic, it received a score of 70 out of 100, based on 16 reviews.

Professional ratings
Aggregate scores
| Source | Rating |
|---|---|
| Metacritic | 70/100 |
Review scores
| Source | Rating |
| AllMusic | 3.5/5 stars |
| Consequence of Sound | B+ |
| Paste | (8.2/10) |

=== Accolades ===
| Publication | Accolade | Year | Rank |
|---|---|---|---|
| Paste | The 50 Best Albums of 2016 | 2016 | 22 |

== Track listing ==
All songs were written by Holly Laessig and Jess Wolfe, except as noted.

| No. | Title | Length |
|---|---|---|
| 1. | "Madness" | 4:07 |
| 2. | "Something About You" | 3:40 |
| 3. | "What We Have (To Change)" | 4:28 |
| 4. | "My Heart Got Caught on Your Sleeve" | 4:35 |
| 5. | "Almost Makes Me Wish For Rain" | 4:37 |
| 6. | "Gone Insane" | 4:18 |
| 7. | "Truce" | 3:26 |
| 8. | "Almighty Gosh" | 3:36 |
| 9. | "Born Again Teen" | 3:54 |
| 10. | "Better Look Back" | 3:43 |
| 11. | "Dusty Trails" | 4:24 |
| Total length: | | 44:46 |

2020 Expanded Edition:

| No. | Title | Writer(s) | Length |
|---|---|---|---|
| 12. | "Strangers" | Dave Davies | 3:14 |
| 13. | "You Were on My Mind" | Sylvia Fricker | 2:19 |
| 14. | "My Heart Got Caught on Your Sleeve (Demo)" | | 4:26 |
| 15. | "Dusty Trails (Demo)" | | 4:31 |
| 16. | "Better Look Back (Demo)" | | 4:20 |
| 17. | "Let's Dance" | David Bowie | 3:34 |
| Total length: | | | 1:07:10 |

== Personnel ==
Lucius

- Jess Wolfe – lead vocals
- Holly Laessig – lead vocals
- Dan Molad – drums
- Peter Lalish – guitar
- Andrew Burri – guitar

Additional musicians

- Rob Moose – strings

Production

- Lucius – production
- Shawn Everett – production, engineering
- Bob Ezrin – production
- Dan Molad – additional production, additional engineering
- Brandon Bost – additional engineering
- Tom Elmhirst – mixing
- Joe Visciano – mixing, mix assistant
- Bob Ludwig – mastering

== Chart performance ==
| Chart (2016) | Peak position |
|---|---|
| Belgian Albums (Ultratop Flanders) | 161 |
| US Billboard 200 | 92 |
| US Digital Albums (Billboard) | 25 |
| US Top Rock Albums (Billboard) | 15 |
| US Top Alternative Albums (Billboard) | 13 |
| US Indie Store Album Sales (Billboard) | 8 |
| US Independent Albums (Billboard) | 6 |
