= JD McPherson =

American rock musician (born 1977)

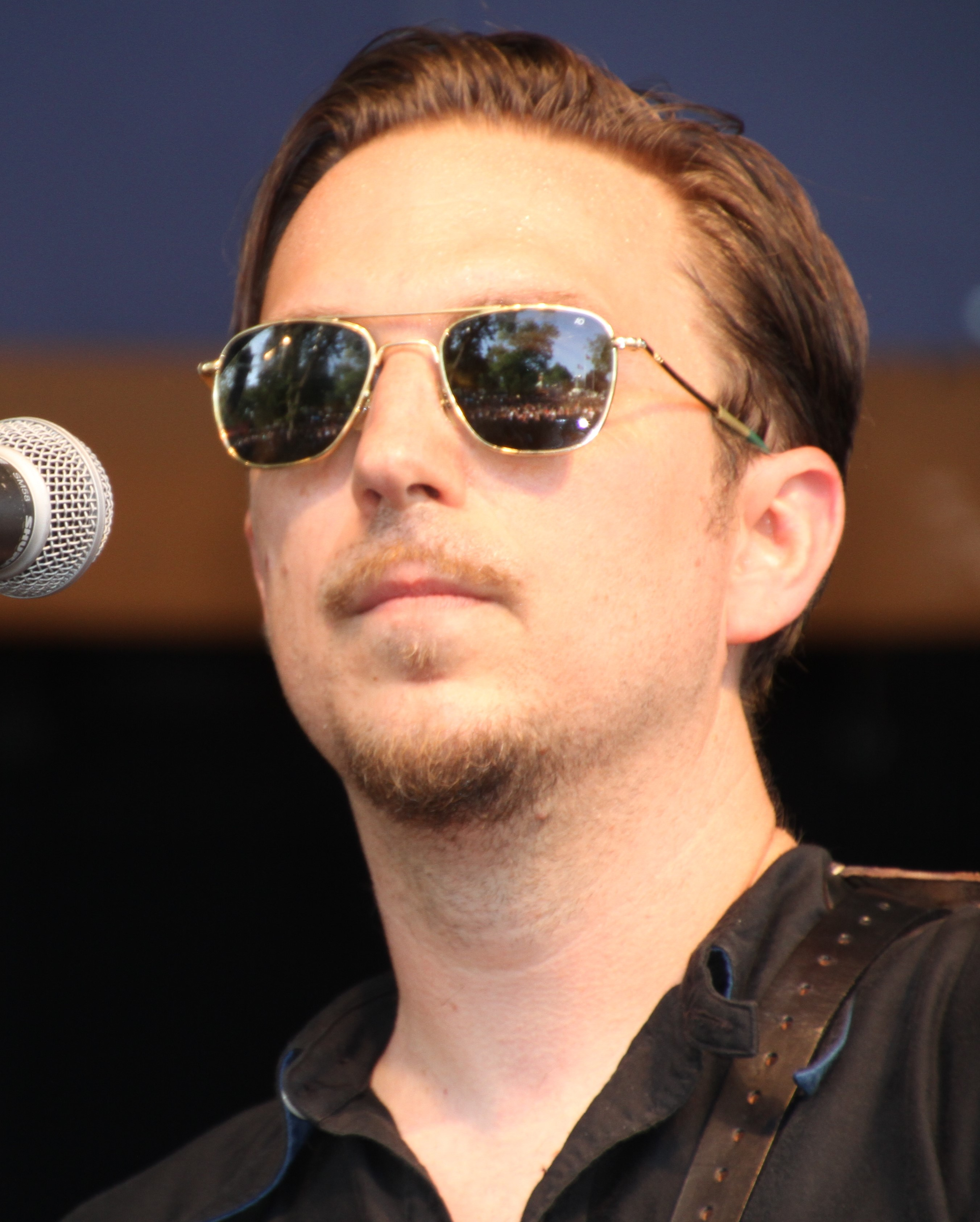
- McPherson in 2017

Background information
- Born: Jonathan David McPherson; April 14, 1977 (age 49); Tulsa, Oklahoma, U.S.
- Origin: Broken Arrow, Oklahoma, U.S.
- Genres: Rock and roll; R&B; rockabilly
- Instruments: Guitar; vocals
- Labels: Hi-STYLE; Rounder
- Members: JD McPherson (vocals, guitar); Doug Corcoran (saxophone, guitar, keys); Alex Hall (drums)
- Past members: Jimmy Sutton (upright bass); Jason Smay (drums); Ray Jacildo (keys)
- Website: jdmcpherson.com

Jonathan David "JD" McPherson (born April 14, 1977) is an American singer-songwriter and guitarist from Broken Arrow, Oklahoma. He is known for a retro sound rooted in the rock and roll, rockabilly, and rhythm and blues music of the 1950s. Among influences such as Little Richard and Fats Domino, McPherson also draws inspiration from artists as diverse as the Wu-Tang Clan, Pixies, and Led Zeppelin.

== Biography ==
McPherson was born as the youngest child in his family in rural southeastern Oklahoma, growing up on the family's cattle ranch near the town of Talihina. His father was a farmer and ex-army, while his mother was a church minister. He took up the guitar at age 13. In high school, he played in a number of local punk rock bands and began writing his own songs. He has stated that he has always been in a band of some sort since he was 16 years old.

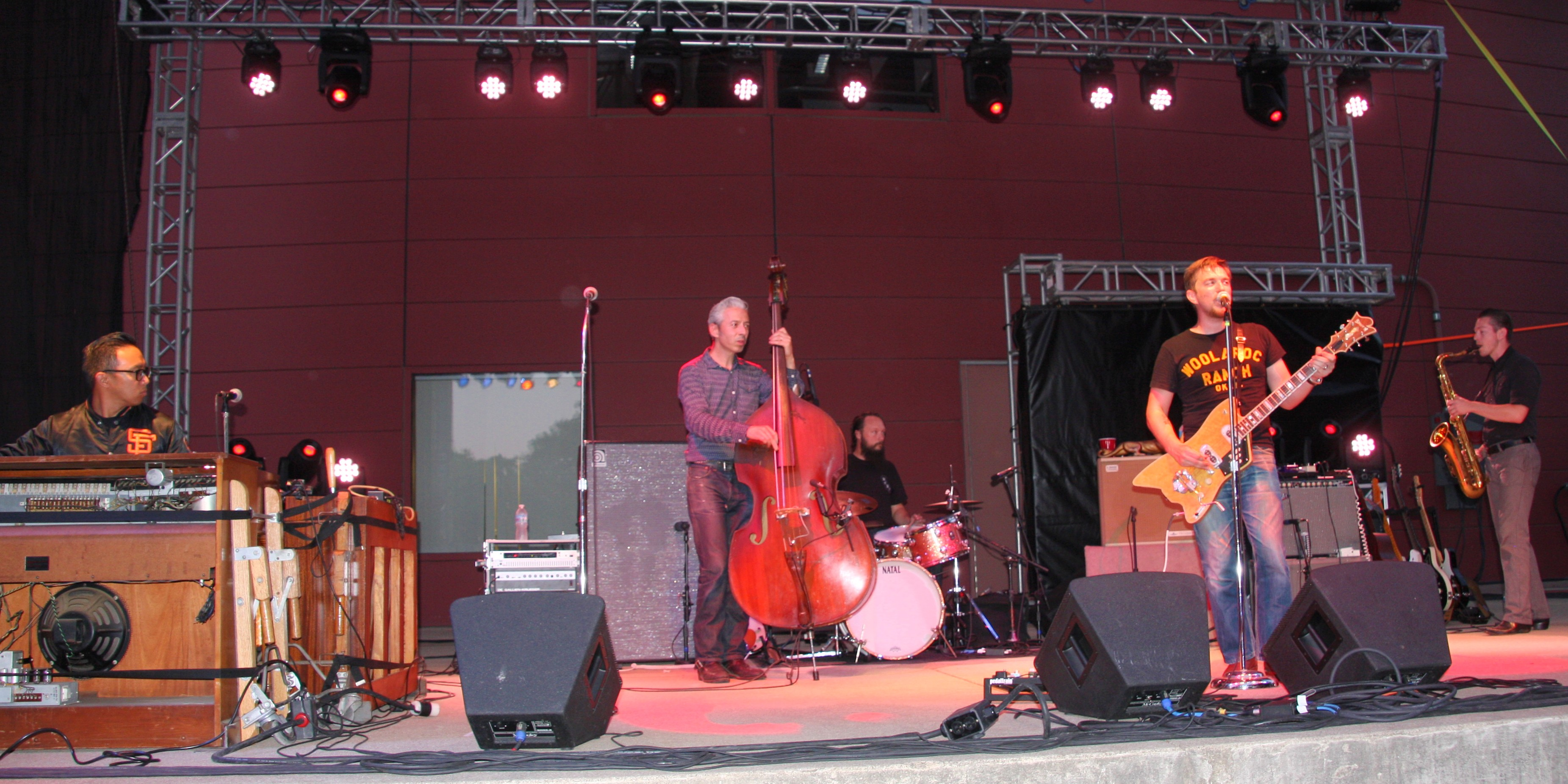
JD McPherson and band in 2016

Of his youth growing up in a quiet rural area, he said that this allowed him to involve himself in the pursuit of music:

But where I actually grew up was just completely removed from anything resembling a town or a city. It was an hour away from the nearest supermarket. What that granted me was a lot of isolation and when you are bored you tend to work really hard on your interests. I was granted a lot of opportunity to play the guitar, listen to music and read about music. So it probably would have been a different story if I grew up in a town somewhere.

During this time, McPherson also developed a strong interest in 1950s rock and roll after being exposed to the music of Buddy Holly. This went on to shape his song writing and sound for bands he was in such as The Poison Okies and The Starkweather Boys.

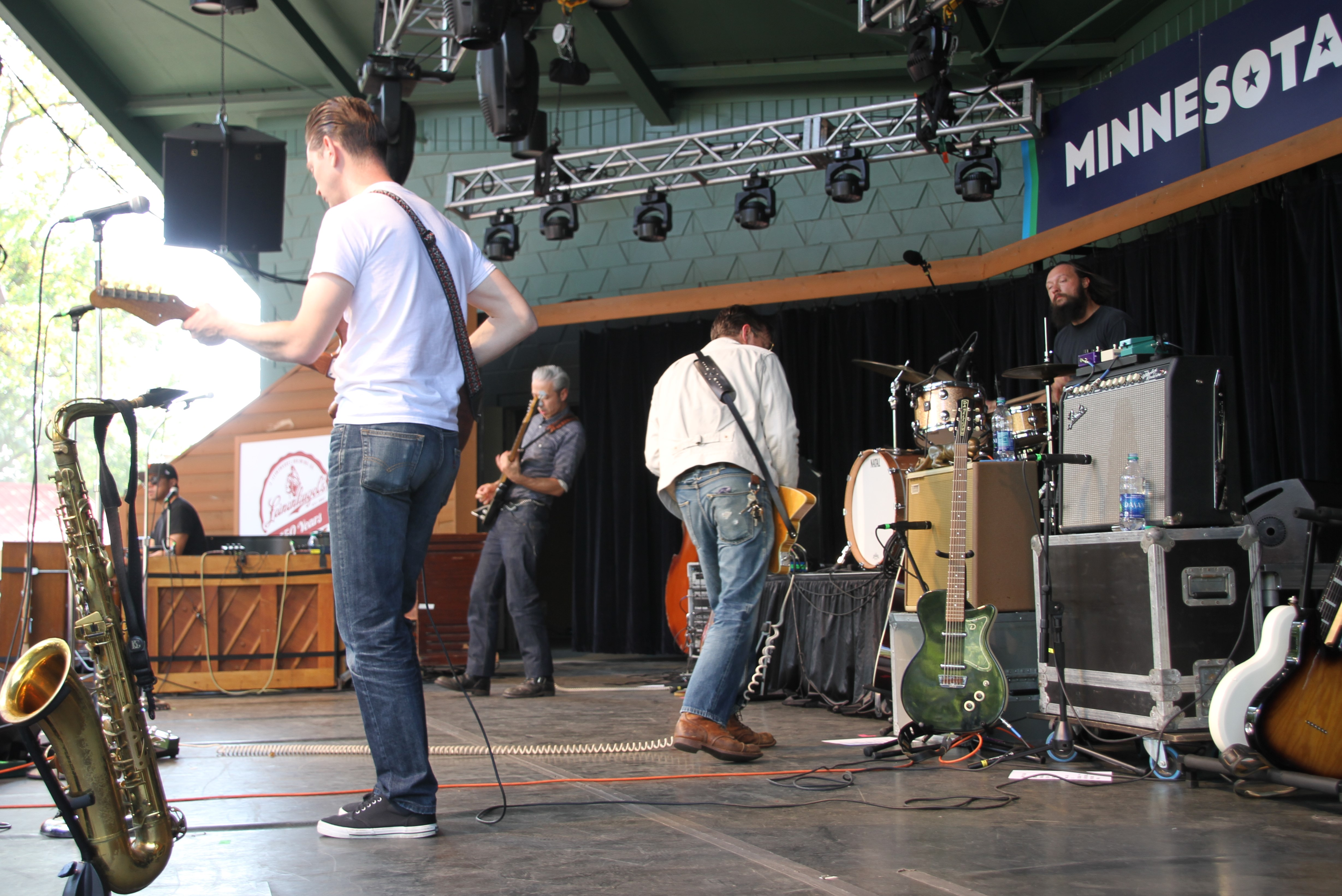
The band at the Minnesota State Fair

He studied visual arts in college, earning a Master of Fine Arts from the University of Tulsa, and later worked as an art and technology teacher. McPherson taught middle school art for four years before embarking on a music career, later remarking that he loved teaching but did not enjoy the bureaucratic aspects of the job. As McPherson stated, "It feels like another life now... It taught me that I'm a terrible employee. I actually really enjoyed the teaching part of it, but wallowing in the mire of administrivia is not a thing I'm very good at."

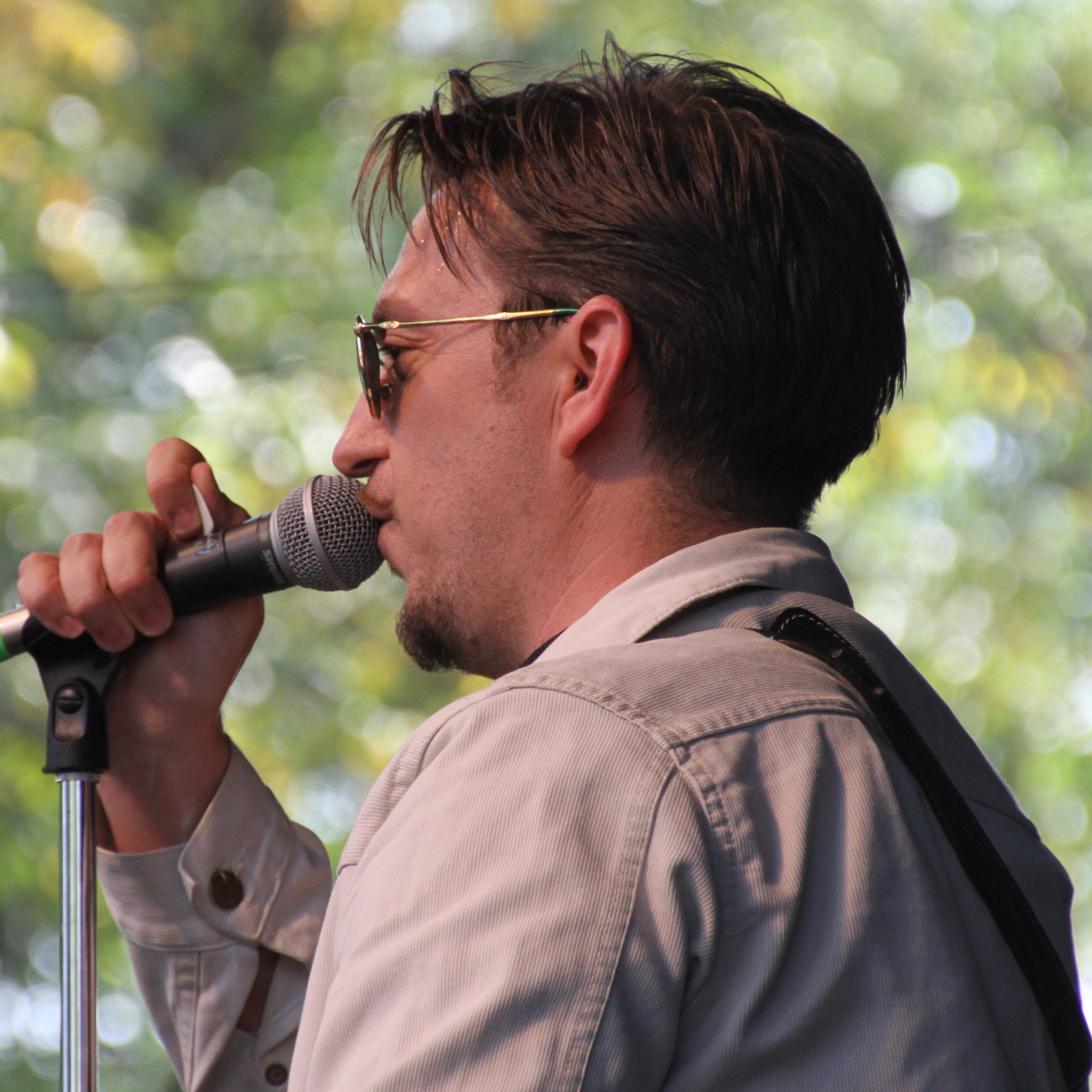
McPherson in 2017

After deciding to pursue music more seriously, McPherson sent a demo to Jimmy Sutton of the small independent record label Hi-STYLE Records, which specialized in roots music. Sutton agreed to produce McPherson's debut album, a process that ultimately led to 2010's Signs and Signifiers. After its wider release through Rounder Records, Rolling Stone gave Signs and Signifiers a 3½ star (out of 5) review in November 2012 and labelled McPherson an "Artist to Watch."

In 2015, McPherson produced the album You're Dreaming by The Cactus Blossoms. The band played the acoustic stage at the Glastonbury Festival 2015 on Friday June 26, before continuing their European tour in the Netherlands.

In October 2015, JD McPherson and band appeared (in animated form) as musical guests performing a new and original song "Crazy Horse" for the DreamWorks animated TV series, The Mr. Peabody & Sherman Show on Netflix.

In June 2022, McPherson joined Robert Plant and Alison Krauss on their Raise the Roof tour, serving as both lead guitarist and opening act.

In 2025 he worked with Jessica Simpson on her new album, Nashville Canyon.

McPherson provided the score for the 2025 FX/Disney+ drama series The Lowdown.

== Discography ==
=== Albums ===
Title	Details	Peak chart positions		
Title	Details	US Rock	US	US Heat
Signs and Signifiers	Release date: April 17, 2012; Label: Rounder	47	161	1
Let the Good Times Roll	Release date: February 10, 2015; Label: Rounder	17	142	1
Undivided Heart & Soul	Release date: October 6, 2017; Label: New West	19	130	—
Socks	Release date: November 2, 2018; Label: New West	—	—	5
Nite Owls	Release date: September 27, 2024; Label: New West	—	—	

==== Signs & Signifiers ====
McPherson's debut album, Signs and Signifiers, was released in 2010 on Hi-STYLE Records. The album was given a major-label release by Rounder Records on April 17, 2012, debuting at number one on the Billboard Heatseekers Albums chart and number 161 on the Billboard 200 the week of June 2, 2012. It also reached number 47 on the Billboard Rock Albums chart.

The single "Your Love (All That I'm Missing)", from the album Signs and Signifiers, was released by Rounder/Hi-STYLE in the UK on June 18, 2012.

No.	Title	Writer(s)	Length
1.	"North Side Gal"	JD McPherson	2:31
2.	"Country Boy"	Big Tiny Kennedy	2:44
3.	"Fire Bug"	JD McPherson	2:18
4.	"Signs & Signifiers"	McPherson / Sutton	4:46
5.	"Wolf Teeth"	McPherson / Sutton	2:57
6.	"Scratching Circles"	McPherson / Sutton	2:10
7.	"A Gentle Awakening"	McPherson / Sutton	3:26
8.	"Dimes For Nickels"	JD McPherson	2:43
9.	"B.G.M.O.S.R.N.R."	McPherson / Sutton	2:59
10.	"I Can't Complain"	McPherson / Sutton	2:37
11.	"Your Love (All That I'm Missing)"	Joseph Simeone (of The Bellfuries)	3:01
12.	"Scandalous"	JD McPherson	2:28
Total length:			34:34

==== Let the Good Times Roll ====
McPherson's second album, Let the Good Times Roll, was released on February 10, 2015.

No.	Title	Writer(s)	Length
1.	"Let the Good Times Roll"	JD McPherson	3:04
2.	"Bossy"	JD McPherson	3:18
3.	"It's All Over But the Shouting"	JD McPherson / Mark Neill	3:03
4.	"Bridgebuilder"	Dan Auerbach / JD McPherson	3:57
5.	"It Shook Me Up"	JD McPherson	2:25
6.	"Head Over Heels"	JD McPherson	3:18
7.	"Shy Boy"	JD McPherson	2:55
8.	"You Must Have Met Little Caroline?"	JD McPherson	3:36
9.	"Precious"	McPherson / Sutton	4:53
10.	"Mother of Lies"	JD McPherson	3:37
11.	"Everybody's Talking ‘Bout the All-American"	JD McPherson	2:11
Total length:			36:17

==== Undivided Heart and Soul ====
JD McPherson's third album, Undivided Heart and Soul, was released on October 6, 2017. The song "Under the Spell of City Lights" is featured in the soundtrack of MLB The Show 18.

No.	Title	Writer(s)	Length
1.	"Desperate Love"	JD McPherson / Doug Corcoran / Jason Smay / Ray Jacildo / Parker Millsap / Jimmy Sutton	2:56
2.	"Crying’s Just a Thing You Do"	McPherson / Corcoran / Sutton / Jacildo / Smay / Butch Walker	3:15
3.	"Lucky Penny"	McPherson / Jacildo / Smay / Corcoran / Jeffrey Randall Bowman / Sutton	3:34
4.	"Hunting for Sugar"	McPherson / Corcoran / Sutton / Jacildo / Smay	4:15
5.	"On the Lips"	JD McPherson	3:41
6.	"Undivided Heart & Soul"	JD McPherson	3:18
7.	"Bloodhound Rock"	JD McPherson	4:21
8.	"Style (Is A Losing Game)"	JD McPherson	3:47
9.	"Jubilee"	McPherson / Corcoran / Sutton / Jacildo / Smay	4:41
10.	"Under the Spell of City Lights"	McPherson / Aaron Lee Tasjan / Jacildo / Adam Molad / Sutton / Corcoran / Smay	3:27
11.	"Let's Get Out of Here While We’re Young"	JD McPherson / Corcoran / Molad / Sutton / Jacildo / Mandy McPherson / Smay / unknown writer	3:07
Total length:			40:22

==== Socks ====
JD McPherson's fourth album, Socks, a Christmas album, was released on November 2, 2018. In Matt Collar's AllMusic review, he asserted that the album is "a jubilantly rockin' production, rife with humor and the Oklahoma-born singer's knack for old-school '50s R&B."

No.	Title	Writer(s)	Length
1.	"All the Gifts I Need"	JD McPherson & Trent Dabbs	2:44
2.	"Bad Kid"	JD McPherson	3:14
3.	"Hey Skinny Santa!"	JD McPherson & Doug Corcoran	2:54
4.	"Socks"	JD McPherson	3:34
5.	"Every Single Christmas"	JD McPherson & Nicole Atkins	2:28
6.	"Ugly Sweater Blues"	JD McPherson	2:57
7.	"Holly, Carol, Candy & Joy"	JD McPherson & Raynier Jacob Jacildo	3:25
8.	"Santa's Got a Mean Machine"	JD McPherson & Jason Smay	2:35
9.	"What's That Sound?"	JD McPherson & Raynier Jacob Jacildo	2:33
10.	"Claus vs. Claus (feat. Lucie Silvas)"	JD McPherson & Lucie Silvas	3:40
11.	"Twinkle (Little Christmas Lights)"	JD McPherson	2:04
Total length:			29:58

==== Nite Owls ====
JD McPherson's fifth album, Nite Owls, was released on September 27, 2024.

No.	Title	Writer(s)	Length
1.	"Sunshine Getaway"	JD McPherson	2:54
2.	"I Can’t Go Anywhere with You (feat. Bloodshot Bill)"	JD McPherson	2:50
3.	"Just Like Summer"	JD McPherson	3:43
4.	"Nite Owls"	JD McPherson	3:12
5.	"Shining Like Gold"	JD McPherson	3:58
6.	"The Rock and Roll Girls"	JD McPherson	3:12
7.	"Baby Blues"	JD McPherson	2:46
8.	"The Phantom Lover of New Rochelle"	JD McPherson	2:56
9.	"Don’t Travel Through the Night Alone"	JD McPherson	4:15
10.	"That’s What a Love Song Does to You"	JD McPherson	2:07
Total length:			31:53

=== Singles and EPs ===
Title	Details	Peak chart positions		
Title	Details	US Rock	US	US Heat
North Side Gal	Release date: 2010; Label: Witchcraft International			
Your Love (All That I'm Missing)	Release date: 2012; Label: Decca Records			
Dimes For Nickels	Release date: 2012; Label: Decca Records			
North Side Gal / Abigail Blue	Release date: 2012; Label: Hi-STYLE Records			
Twinkle (Little Christmas Lights)	Release date: Dec 11, 2012; Label: New Rounder			
Fire Bug / A Gentle Awakening	Release date: 2013; Label: Rounder Records			
I Wish You Would / Steal Away	Release date: Sep 16, 2014; Label: Vee-Jay Records			
The Warm Covers EP	Release date: Oct 14, 2014; Label: New Rounder			
Bossy / Rome Wasn't Built In A Day	Release date: Nov 10, 2014; Label: Rounder Records			
A Little Respect	Release date: Jan 26, 2017; Label: Amazon Music			
Lucky Penny	Release date: August 8, 2017; Label: New West Records			

==== The Warm Covers EP ====
The Warm Covers EP, an EP consisting of four song covers, was released on the 14th of October, 2014.

No.	Title	Writer(s)	Original artist	Length
1.	"I Wish You Would"	Billy Boy Arnold	Billy Boy Arnold	2:45
2.	"Steal Away"	Jimmy Hughes	Jimmy Hughes	3:08
3.	"Rome Wasn't Built In a Day"	Nick Lowe	Nick Lowe	3:00
4.	"Why Lady Why"	Richard Edward Scott & Teddy Gentry	Alabama	3:01
Total length:				11:54

==== The Warm Covers EP, Vol. 2 ====
The Warm Covers EP, Vol. 2, an EP consisting of five song covers, was released in 2022.

No.	Title	Writer(s)	Original artist	Length
1.	"Just Around The Corner"			2:56
2.	"Lust For Life / Sixteen"			3:28
3.	"Let's Rock"			2:28
4.	"Manta Ray"			2:20
5.	"It's Raining"			2:39
Total length:				13:51

=== Music videos ===
Year	Video	Director
2012	"North Side Gal"	JD McPherson
2012	"Fire Bug"	JD McPherson
2012	"A Gentle Awakening"	JD McPherson
2012	"Scratching Circles"	JD McPherson
2015	"Head Over Heels"	JD McPherson
2015	"Let the Good Times Roll"	JD McPherson
2015	"It's All Over But the Shouting"	JD McPherson
2017	"Lucky Penny"	George Salisbury
2017	"Style (Is a Losing Game)"	Sean Dejecacion
2018	"On the Lips"	George Salisbury

== Awards ==
- Independent Music Awards 2012: Signs & Signifiers – Best Rock/Hard Rock Album
