= Undivided Heart & Soul =

Studio album by JD McPherson
- Released: October 6, 2017
- Length: 40:15
- Label: New West

JD McPherson chronology
| Let the Good Times Roll (2015) | Undivided Heart & Soul (2017) | Socks (2018) |

Professional ratings
Aggregate scores
| Source | Rating |
|---|---|
| Metacritic | 77/100 |
Review scores
| Source | Rating |
| AllMusic | 4/5 stars |
| American Songwriter | 4/5 stars |
| The Austin Chronicle | 4/5 stars |
| Paste | 8.1/10 |
| PopMatters | 8/10 |

Undivided Heart & Soul is the third studio album by American singer-songwriter JD McPherson. It was released on October 6, 2017, through New West Records.

== Accolades ==
| Publication | Accolade | Rank | Ref. |
|---|---|---|---|
| American Songwriter | Top 25 Albums of 2017 | 5 | |
| Rolling Stone | Top 40 Country Albums of 2017 | 33 | |

== Track listing ==
| No. | Title | Length |
|---|---|---|
| 1. | "Desperate Love" | 2:56 |
| 2. | "Crying's Just a Thing You Do" | 3:14 |
| 3. | "Lucky Penny" | 3:34 |
| 4. | "Hunting for Sugar" | 4:15 |
| 5. | "On the Lips" | 3:40 |
| 6. | "Undivided Heart & Soul" | 3:18 |
| 7. | "Bloodhound Rock" | 4:20 |
| 8. | "Style (Is a Losing Game)" | 3:46 |
| 9. | "Jubilee" | 4:40 |
| 10. | "Under the Spell of City Lights" | 3:26 |
| 11. | "Let's Get out of Here While We're Young" | 3:06 |

== Charts ==
| Chart | Peak position |
|---|---|
| US Billboard 200 | 130 |
| US Americana/Folk Albums (Billboard) | 3 |
| US Independent Albums (Billboard) | 4 |
| US Top Rock Albums (Billboard) | 19 |
