= Wildewoman =

Studio album by Lucius
- Released: October 15, 2013
- Genre: Indie pop
- Length: 43:50
- Labels: PIAS, Mom + Pop, Dine Alone
- Producer: Lucius

Lucius chronology
Songs From The Bromley House (2009)	Wildewoman (2013)	Good Grief (2016)

Wildewoman is the second studio album by Brooklyn indie pop band Lucius. It was released on PIAS Recordings, Mom + Pop Music and Dine Alone Records to mostly positive reviews, drawing numerous comparisons to the girl groups of the 1960s. Reviewers also praised the album's eclectic mix of musical styles, as well as the vocal performances of lead singers Jess Wolfe and Holly Laessig. The album peaked at number 150 on the Billboard 200 chart.

== Packaging and title ==
The album's cover artwork is a 1964 painting by Belgian pop artist Evelyne Axell, titled Ice Cream. In selecting the image, Wolfe and Laessig drew inspiration from other iconic, provocative album covers including Sticky Fingers and Nevermind. Laessig said "At the time, [Axell] was making a statement that was incredibly bold, and we think our show is bold, we’re strong women. There's nothing shy about the way that we sound and the way we put ourselves out there. It's a strong image. And if you’re looking at fifteen record covers on iTunes, what's going to stick out to you?"

The album title was taken from the song of the same name and was intended to evoke "free-spirited women". It is pronounced analogously to "wildebeest".

In 2024, as enough time had passed to avoid any conflict with their old label, Lucius re-recorded the entire album with their new bandmates under the title Wildewoman (The New Recordings). They added "(The New Recording)" to all the song titles. Lucius used a different cover image from Evelyne Axell, a 1966 piece titled "Le mur du son." Marcus Mumford sang on the new recording of "Go Home," as did Devon Gilfillian on "Tempest." Frequent collaborator Brandi Carlile joined Lucius on one of two versions of the previously unreleased track "Housewarming."

== Reception ==
Professional ratings
Review scores
Source	Rating
AllMusic	3.5/5 stars
Consequence of Sound	C+
Paste	(9/10)
Rolling Stone	3.5/5 stars

=== Critical ===
Wildewoman received generally positive reviews from critics, many of whom praised the vocal performances and girl group-inspired sound. In a review for Paste, Hilary Saunders wrote that the album was successful in "reintroducing retro girl-group swag to the 21st century at a time when it's most needed" and went on to call it "one of the most complete indie pop LPs this year". James Christopher Monger of AllMusic praised the album's fusion of styles and the "commanding performances" of Wolfe and Laessig, while Will Hermes' review for Rolling Stone described the album's sound as "fresh" and "thrilling". Writing for Consequence of Sound, Tony Hardy gave the album a more reserved assessment but noted that the band "spins some intriguing sounds".

Wildewoman also appeared on a number of year-end best album lists, including those compiled by Bob Boilen of NPR's All Songs Considered and the music staff at Amazon.com.

=== Commercial ===
The album debuted at No. 150 on the Billboard 200 album chart, with 3,000 copies sold in its first week. The album has sold 46,000 copies in the US as of March 2016.

== Track listing ==
All songs written by Holly Laessig and Jess Wolfe unless otherwise noted.

1. "Wildewoman" – 4:11
2. "Turn It Around" – 3:28
3. "Go Home" – 3:19
4. "Hey, Doreen" – 4:41
5. "Tempest" – 4:09 (Laessig/Molad/Wolfe)
6. "Nothing Ordinary" – 3:01
7. "Two of Us on the Run" – 4:35
8. "Until We Get There" – 3:28 (Laessig/Molad/Wolfe)
9. "Don't Just Sit There" – 3:51
10. "Monsters" – 3:29
11. "How Loud Your Heart Gets" – 5:38

The 2024 "The New Recordings" album had these tracks.

1. "Wildewoman (The New Recording)" – 4:12
2. "Turn It Around (The New Recording)" – 3:29
3. "Go Home (feat. Marcus Mumford) (The New Recording)" – 3:18
4. "Hey, Doreen (The New Recording)" – 4:37
5. "Tempest (feat. Devon Gilfillian) (The New Recording)" – 4:11 (Laessig/Molad/Wolfe)
6. "Nothing Ordinary (The New Recording)" – 3:10
7. "Two of Us on the Run (The New Recording)" – 4:35
8. "Until We Get There (The New Recording)" – 3:31 (Laessig/Molad/Wolfe)
9. "Don't Just Sit There (The New Recording)" – 3:49
10. "Monsters (The New Recording)" – 3:29
11. "Housewarming (The New Recording)" – 4:10
12. "How Loud Your Heart Gets (The New Recording)" – 5:24
13. "Genevieve (The New Recording)" – 3:48
14. "Housewarming (feat. Brandi Carlile) (The New Recording)" – 4:10

== Personnel ==
Lucius

- Jess Wolfe – Lead vocals
- Holly Laessig – Lead vocals
- Dan Molad – Drums
- Peter Lalish – Guitar
- Andrew Burri – Guitar

Additional musicians

- Alan Hampton – Bass
- Adam Christgau – Percussion
- Gabriel Duncan – Guitar, Vocals
- Jessica Martins – Backing vocals
- Blake Mills – Guitar
- Leital Molad – Backing vocals
- Shelley Molad – Backing vocals
- Chris Morrissey – Bass
- Michaela Neller – Backing vocals
- Sydney Price – Backing vocals
- Rich Hinman – Guitar
- Heather Robb – Backing vocals
- Eric Robertson – Tenor guitar

Production

- Lucius – production, engineering
- Tony Berg – additional production
- Steve Wall – additional production, engineering
- Shawn Everett – engineering, mixing
- Jacob Goldman – engineering
- David Kahne – mixing
- Bob Ludwig – mastering

== Chart performance ==
Chart (2013)	Peak position
US Billboard 200	150
US Top Heatseekers (Billboard)	5
US Independent Albums (Billboard)	36
