= Devon Gilfillian =

American soul singer

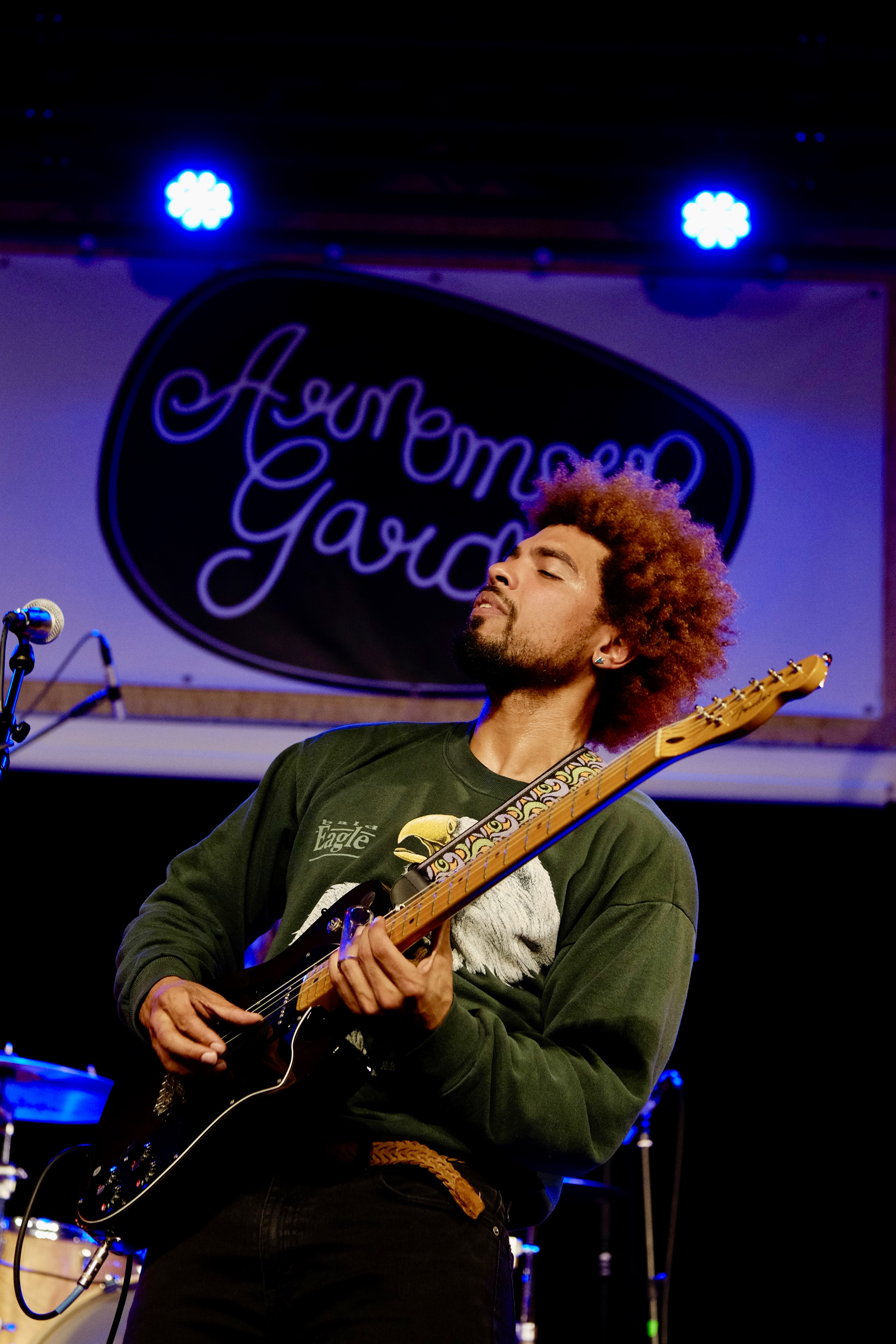

Background information
- Born: Morton, PA
- Genres: Soul, gospel blues
- Occupation: Singer-songwriter
- Instruments: Vocals, guitar
- Years active: 2013–present
- Labels: Fantasy Records, Capitol
- Website: devongilfillian.com

Devon Gilfillian is an American soul singer-songwriter based in Nashville, Tennessee.

== Early life ==
Gilfillian is originally from Morton, Pennsylvania. He began playing guitar at age 14, and while still in high school played in a band called Black Sheep. He attended West Chester University, where he graduated with a degree in psychology, and also played in cover bands including Hot Spoon Gilly. Growing up, his father, Nelson Gilfillian, was a singer and percussionist in a local band.

== Career ==
After moving to Nashville in 2013 and serving with AmeriCorps rebuilding homes for low-income homeowners, Gilfillian joined a local blues cover band. In 2016, he released his debut self-titled EP, of gospel-inspired blues-rock.

His major label debut album Black Hole Rainbow was released on January 10, 2020, on Capitol Records. It was nominated for a 2021 Grammy Award for Best Engineered Album, Non-Classical. The album features production from Shawn Everett, and co-writing from Jamie Lidell. Three of the album's singles reached the Billboard Adult Alternative Songs chart: "Unchained" peaked at number 7, "Get Out and Get It" peaked at number 12, and "The Good Life" peaked at number 5.

On October 22, 2020, Gilfillian released a track-by-track cover of Marvin Gaye's 1971 album What's Going On with 100% of the profits donated to Tennessee's Equity Alliance Fund.

On April 7, 2023, Gilfillian released his second full-length studio album Love You Anyway via Fantasy Records. Produced by Jeremy Lutito (Joy Oladokun, NEEDTOBREATHE), the album includes the single “All I Really Wanna Do” which peaked at No. 6 on Billboard's Adult Alternative Songs chart.

Gilfillian was featured on a cover of Sam Cooke's "Having a Party" on the 2024 charity Christmas album A Philly Special Christmas Party by The Philly Specials.

== Performances ==
Gilfillian performed at Newport Folk Festival and Montreal Jazz Fest, and at the 2018 NFL draft in Dallas. On March 7, 2020, he made his national television debut on CBS This Morning, performing the track "The Good Life". He opened for Brothers Osborne on their 2019 tour, and Grace Potter on her 2020 US tour. He has also opened for Mavis Staples, Gladys Knight, and Michael McDonald. He performed a cover of Marvin Gaye's "Mercy Mercy Me (The Ecology)" on The Late Show with Stephen Colbert on October 23, 2020, and performed "The Good Life" on Jimmy Kimmel Live in December 2020.

In April 2023, he headlined his national Love You Anyway Tour.

== Discography ==
=== Albums ===
Title	Album details
Black Hole Rainbow	Released: January 10, 2020; Formats: CD, LP, digital download, streaming; Label: Capitol Records
What's Going On	Released: October 22, 2020; Formats: LP, streaming; Label: Capitol Records
Love You Anyway	Released: April 7, 2023; Formats: CD, LP, digital download, streaming; Label: Fantasy Records
Time Will Tell	Released: June 26, 2026; Formats: CD, LP, digital download, streaming; Label: Fantasy Records

=== EP ===
Title	Album details
Devon Gilfillian	Released: May 23, 2016; Formats: CD, digital download, streaming; Label: Self released

=== Singles ===
Title	Year	Peak chart positions	Album
Title	Year	US AAA	Album
"Here and Now"	2017	—	Devon Gilfillian
"Troublemaker"	2018	—	Non-album singles
"High"	2018	—	Non-album singles
"Truth" (feat. Tate Tucker)	2018	—	Non-album singles
"Winter Wonderland"	2018	—	Non-album singles
"Feels Good"	2019	—	Non-album singles
"Get Out and Get It"	2019	12	Black Hole Rainbow
"Unchained"	2019	7	Black Hole Rainbow
"The Good Life"	2020	5	Black Hole Rainbow
"Freedom" (with Illiterate Light)	2020	8	Non-album single
"All I Really Wanna Do"	2023	6	Love You Anyway
"Love You Anyway"	2023	25	Love You Anyway
"Hold On (Hourglass)"	2026	40	Time Will Tell
"IRL"	2026	—	Time Will Tell
"Black Dog Rabbit Hole"	2026	8	Time Will Tell
"—" denotes a recording that did not chart or was not released in that territory.
