= Live Drugs Again =

2024 live album by the War on Drugs

Live album by The War on Drugs
- Released: September 13, 2024
- Recorded: February 2022–December 2023
- Length: 72:30
- Label: Super High Quality
- Producer: The War on Drugs

The War on Drugs chronology
I Don't Live Here Anymore (2021)	Live Drugs Again (2024)

Live Drugs Again is a live album by The War on Drugs, released on September 13, 2024, by Super High Quality Records.

== Background and recording ==
The album features live recordings from over 30 concerts of the band's tour from February 2022 to December 2023 across the United States, UK, Europe, and Australia. According to frontman Adam Granduciel, the album "chronicles the evolution of these songs from the studio to stages all over the world; documenting our continued growth as a live band." Whereas its predecessor, Live Drugs, focused on the band's albums Lost in the Dream and A Deeper Understanding, Live Drugs draws most heavily from the band's album I Don't Live Here Anymore. The songs were assembled from several performances, with the recording of "Under the Pressure" being constructed from six different performances.

== Release ==
The album was officially announced on September 4, 2024, with a live edit of "Burning" simultaneously released as the lead single. At the same time, a limited edition double-LP vinyl version, 666 copies of which were pressed onto transparent blue vinyl, was made available for pre-order.

The album was released digitally on September 13, 2024, through Super High Quality Records. One day earlier, the band began their co-headlining Zen Diagram tour with the National, with support from Lucius, in Gilford, New Hampshire, concluding on October 12 in Monterrey, Mexico.

=== Encore Edition ===
On November 18, 2024, the band released Live Drugs Again (Encore Edition) with two additional tracks, "Nothing to Find" and "Occasional Rain". The Encore Edition was issued on CD on December 13, 2024, and on cassette on January 10, 2025, in partnership with Transgressive Records and Canvasback for certain territories. A standard edition of the Live Drugs Again vinyl was also released out January 10.

== Critical reception ==
Professional ratings
Aggregate scores
Source	Rating
Metacritic	81/100
Review scores
Source	Rating
Classic Rock	6/10
Mojo	4/5 stars
Pitchfork	7.9/10
Record Collector	4/5 stars
Uncut	8/10

At Metacritic, which assigns a normalized rating out of 100 to reviews from mainstream publications, Live Drugs Again received an average score of 81 based on 5 reviews, indicating "universal acclaim".

Pitchfork rated the album 7.9 out of 10, calling it a "celebration of the band as a symbiotic unit and an impressive distillation of its cosmic Americana sound" and saying it proved the band's "force as a symbiotic unit" "more than Live Drugs, and maybe more than any of their studio albums". Uproxx critic Steven Hyden called the album "epic rock 'n' roll that manages to top even the titanic Live Drugs, if only because The War On Drugs are that much better as a live band." Uncut wrote, "The singer-guitarist somehow manages to deliver passages of remarkable intimacy within this sonic immensity, as if the sounds were an externalisation of the ravaged psyche he first exposed on the 2014 modern-day landmark Lost in the Dream." Mojo wrote that "Live, the band's urgency and spaciousness transform their fondness for cavernous arena rhythms and antiquated synths from clever re-appropriations into something that teases transcendence."

== Track listing ==
All tracks are written by Adam Granduciel, excepted where noted.

Standard edition
No.	Title	Writer(s)	Length
1.	"Harmonia's Dream (Live...Again)"	Granduciel; Robbie Bennett	9:57
2.	"Burning (Live...Again)"		5:10
3.	"Old Skin (Live...Again)"		5:11
4.	"Come to the City (Live...Again)"	Granduciel; David Hartley	6:57
5.	"I Don't Wanna Wait (Live...Again)"	Granduciel; Anthony LaMarca	5:02
6.	"Pain (Live...Again)"		5:50
7.	"Slow Ghost (Live...Again)"	Granduciel; Hartley	3:19
8.	"In Chains (Live...Again)"		7:55
9.	"Living Proof (Live...Again)"		4:55
10.	"Under the Pressure (Live...Again)"		10:51
11.	"I Don't Live Here Anymore (Live...Again)"	Granduciel; Robbie Bennett	7:23

Encore Edition track listing
No.	Title	Writer(s)	Length
1.	"Harmonia's Dream (Live...Again)"	Granduciel; Robbie Bennett	9:57
2.	"Burning (Live...Again)"		5:10
3.	"Old Skin (Live...Again)"		5:11
4.	"Come to the City (Live...Again)"	Granduciel; David Hartley	6:57
5.	"I Don't Wanna Wait (Live...Again)"	Granduciel; Anthony LaMarca	5:02
6.	"Pain (Live...Again)"		5:50
7.	"Nothing to Find (Live...Again)"		5:31
8.	"Slow Ghost (Live...Again)"	Granduciel; Hartley	3:19
9.	"In Chains (Live...Again)"		7:55
10.	"Living Proof (Live...Again)"		4:55
11.	"Under the Pressure (Live...Again)"		10:51
12.	"I Don't Live Here Anymore (Live...Again)"	Granduciel; Robbie Bennett	7:08
13.	"Occasional Rain (Live...Again)"		5:03

== Personnel ==
The War on Drugs

- Adam Granduciel
- David Hartley
- Robbie Bennett
- Charlie Hall
- Jon Natchez
- Anthony LaMarca
- Eliza Hardy Jones

Technical

- The War on Drugs – production
- Austin Asvanonda – mixing
- Adam Granduciel – mixing
- Greg Calbi – mastering

Artwork

- Dominic East – photography
- Rob Carmichael (SEEN) – design

== Charts ==
Chart performance
Chart (2024)	Peak position
UK Album Downloads (Official Charts)	17
UK Independent Albums (Official Charts)	27
UK Physical Albums (Official Charts)	90

Chart performance
Chart (2025)	Peak position
UK Physical Albums (Official Charts)	80
