= Slave Ambient =

2011 studio album by the War on Drugs

Studio album by The War on Drugs
- Released: August 16, 2011
- Recorded: 2008–2011
- Genres: Indie rock; indie folk; neo-psychedelia; shoegazing
- Length: 46:52
- Label: Secretly Canadian
- Producers: Jeff Zeigler; Adam Granduciel; John Congleton

The War on Drugs chronology
Future Weather (2010)	Slave Ambient (2011)	Lost in the Dream (2014)

Singles from Slave Ambient
- 1. "Baby Missiles" Released: September 12, 2011; 2. "Come to the City" Released: December 5, 2011; 3. "Best Night" Released: March 12, 2012

Slave Ambient is the second studio album by American indie rock band The War on Drugs, released on August 16, 2011, on Secretly Canadian. Recorded over three years, Slave Ambient is the final release to feature contributions from founding guitarist Kurt Vile and drummer Mike Zanghi, and the only album to feature drummer Steven Urgo.

The album was preceded by the EP Future Weather in 2010.

== Background and recording ==
Regarding his recording contributions to Slave Ambient former guitarist Kurt Vile stated, "I was stoked to play on those songs ["Best Night" and "It's Your Destiny"], but I was more involved in the early days. Obviously the first record I was very involved in."

== Artwork ==
Slave Ambient's artwork features photography by founding member Adam Granduciel. Its cover photograph was taken in Zaragoza, Spain, in July 2009, whilst on tour with the band, while its interior photographs were taken when on tour as a member of Kurt Vile & the Violators in October 2009, in Livingston, Montana. The abstract shapes on the covers of both Slave Ambient and Future Weather EP are results of happy accidents with a not-fully-functioning made-in-China Holga camera.

== Reception ==
Professional ratings
Aggregate scores
Source	Rating
AnyDecentMusic?	7.9/10
Metacritic	82/100
Review scores
Source	Rating
AllMusic	3.5/5 stars
The A.V. Club	A−
The Guardian	4/5 stars
The Irish Times	4/5 stars
Mojo	4/5 stars
NME	7/10
The Observer	3/5 stars
Pitchfork	8.3/10
Spin	7/10
Uncut	5/5 stars

Upon release, Slave Ambient received positive reviews from music critics. At Metacritic, which assigns a normalized rating out of 100 to reviews from mainstream critics, the album received an average of 82, based on 31 reviews, which indicates "universal acclaim".

Stuart Berman of Pitchfork gave the album a positive review, writing "The really amazing thing about the album is how anthemic and affirming it feels despite the near total absence of proper sing-along choruses." The album also received a "Best New Music" designation from the site. The A.V. Club's Steven Hyden also gave the album a positive review, writing "With Adam Granduciel’s Dylan-esque drawl and a small orchestra of shimmering, vaguely noodly guitars as the group’s sonic trademarks, The War On Drugs is an unabashed trad-rock outfit. But Slave Ambient doesn’t recall the past so much as a bright, unexpected future, where bands like this inexplicably are still dreaming in new, refreshingly outsized ways." BBC's Lou Thomas called the songs on the album "memorable," concluding his review with "Slave Ambient as a whole may be more confused than your average reality show star at a Mensa meeting, but it’s full of decent songs with a lot of heart."

In a more mixed review, Slant Magazine's Matthew Cole wrote "Too often, ambient passages like 'The Animator' and 'City Reprise' sound too obviously like interludes intended to fill space between real songs, rather than finished compositions in their own right." However, Cole concluded his review with: "...War on Drugs is a well-studied rock crew with an honest experimental streak, unfazed by the fact that relatively few of their potential fans will count Nebraska and Daydream Nation among their favorite records. But with a little more time to perfect their style, the War on Drugs would be well-positioned to win converts for both camps, and also their own." In another mixed review, Now's Richard Trapunski wrote: "It’s easy to get lost in the pleasant, euphoric drone, but at 47 minutes the album is more of a marathon than a sprint." Spin gave the album a score of 7/10, writing, "Main man Adam Granduciel gets plenty of Dylan comparisons, but Slave Ambient feels like a more back-alley Byrds filtered through a gauzier Spacemen 3 lens."

=== Accolades ===
Slave Ambient has appeared on several end-of-year lists. Paste ranked the album #37 on its list of the best 50 albums of 2011, writing "Even with the departure of Kurt Vile [...] their post-Vile songs have kept them steady, and, as proven by the almost defiantly solid Slave Ambient, they can be memorable and engaging all by themselves." Uncut placed Slave Ambient at number 10 on its list, while Mojo ranked the album #21 on its end-of-year list. Pitchfork ranked the album #39 on its list of the Top 50 Albums of 2011.

== Track listing ==
All songs written by Adam Granduciel, except where noted.

No.	Title	Music	Length
1.	"Best Night"		5:30
2.	"Brothers"	Adam Granduciel, Dave Hartley, Mike Zanghi, Robbie Bennett	4:29
3.	"I Was There"		3:49
4.	"Your Love Is Calling My Name"		6:01
5.	"The Animator"		2:16
6.	"Come to the City"	Adam Granduciel, Dave Hartley	4:31
7.	"Come for It"		0:28
8.	"It's Your Destiny"	Adam Granduciel, Robbie Bennett	4:49
9.	"City Reprise #12"		3:05
10.	"Baby Missiles"		3:33
11.	"Original Slave"		3:11
12.	"Black Water Falls"		5:10
Total length:			46:52

== Personnel ==
The following people contributed to Slave Ambient:

=== The War on Drugs ===
- Adam Granduciel – lead vocals, electric guitars (1–4, 8–9, 12), acoustic guitars (1), animator guitars (1), harmonica (1, 3–4, 6, 10–11), Siel OR400 (4–5, 8–9), samplers (1, 4, 6, 8), organ (5–6, 12), harmonizer (2, 4, 9), tapes (4, 6–7), cassettes (5, 9, 11), ARP Omni (4, 8), bass guitar (3), keyboards (10), Tom Thumb piano (1), Farfisa (4), Korg Mono/Poly (5), Eventide (5), Moogerfooger (5), Voyager (6), synthesizer (7), percussion (8), drum machine (9), filters (10), dubs (11), drums (12)
- Dave Hartley – bass guitar (1–2, 6, 8, 10, 12), electric guitar (8, 10), Nashville guitar (2), twelve-string guitar (6, 12), Voyager (2), Roland Juno-60 (3), drums (6), electric autoharp (10)
- Robbie Bennett – piano (1–2, 8), acoustic guitar (2), ARP Omni II (12), percussion (8)
- Mike Zanghi – drums (2, 6, 10, 12), percussion (2, 6, 10, 12), Hayman (4), Mu-Tron Bi-Phase (10)

=== Additional musicians ===
- Kurt Vile – electric guitar (1, 8)
- Steven Urgo – drums (1)
- Jeff Zeigler – drum programming (4), harmonizers (4), patch bay (4–5), SPX90 (5)
- Michael Johnson – Eventide (4), modular Moog treatments (4), hamonizer settings (5), drums (6)
- Jeff Ryan – drums (3)
- Chad Stockslager – upright piano (3)
- Jesse Trbovich – saxophone (5)
- Kim Roney – piano (12)
- John Ashley – Voyager (12)

=== Recording ===
- Adam Granduciel – production, recording
- Jeff Zeigler – production, recording
- John Ashley – recording
- Michael Johnson – additional engineering
- John Congleton – additional engineering
- Dave Hartley – additional engineering
- Brian McTear – mixing (track 10)

=== Artwork ===
- Adam Granduciel – photography
- Daniel Murphy – design

== Charts ==
Chart performance for Slave Ambient
Chart (2011–2024)	Peak position
Belgian Albums (Ultratop Flanders)	180
Belgian Albums (Ultratop Wallonia)	159
US Independent Albums (Billboard)	27
US Heatseekers Albums (Billboard)	4
