= Live Drugs =

2020 live album by the War on Drugs

Live album by The War on Drugs
- Released: November 20, 2020
- Recorded: 2014–2019
- Venue: Various tour dates
- Label: Super High Quality

The War on Drugs chronology
A Deeper Understanding (2017)	Live Drugs (2020)	I Don't Live Here Anymore (2021)

Live Drugs is a live album by American rock band The War on Drugs, released on November 20, 2020, by Super High Quality Records, the imprint founded by bandleader Adam Granduciel. The set compiles performances captured between 2014 and 2019 and was sequenced to mirror a typical 70-minute concert set by the band.

== Background and recording ==
The band assembled Live Drugs from more than 40 hard drives of soundboard recordings spanning multiple tours. The goal was to document live arrangements that evolved on stage across the 2014–2019 period. Granduciel curated the material with longtime confidant Dominic East, who is credited as co-producer. The track selection includes the Warren Zevon cover "Accidentally Like a Martyr" and an early live version of "Strangest Thing". The running order was designed to replicate the flow of a full show.

== Release and promotion ==
Live Drugs was announced on October 6, 2020, alongside the release of the lead track "Pain (Live)". The band also launched Season 1 of the Super High Quality Podcast, a four-part series discussing the live recordings and decisions behind the album.

== Composition ==
The album functions as a concert document rather than a single-show recording. It draws from tours supporting Lost in the Dream and A Deeper Understanding, and includes long-running set pieces such as the transition from "Under the Pressure" into "In Reverse".

== Critical reception ==
Live Drugs received positive notices from critics. Pitchfork writer Steven Arroyo scored the set 7.8 out of 10, noting the sequencing captured the band's metamorphosis and praising the clean mix that highlighted the expanded lineup's low-end power. The Fire Note's Brian Q. Newcomb called the release a gift during a year without concerts and highlighted the organic energy and extended jams that distinguish the performances from their studio counterparts.

== Track listing ==
All tracks are written by The War on Drugs, except where noted

No.	Title	Writer(s)	Length
1.	"An Ocean Between the Waves (Live)"		7:30
2.	"Pain (Live)"		5:16
3.	"Strangest Thing (Live)"		7:13
4.	"Red Eyes (Live)"		5:49
5.	"Thinking of a Place (Live)"		10:36
6.	"Buenos Aires Beach (Live)"		5:09
7.	"Accidentally Like a Martyr (Live)"	Warren Zevon	4:27
8.	"Eyes to the Wind (Live)"		9:13
9.	"Under the Pressure (Live)"		11:58
10.	"In Reverse (Live)"		7:37

== Personnel ==
Adapted from the band and mastering engineer pages.

Production

- Dominic East – co-producer
- Greg Calbi – mastering

== Charts ==
Chart (2020)	Peak position
UK Albums (OCC)	80
UK Independent Albums (OCC)	12
UK Vinyl Albums (OCC)	12
UK Scottish Albums (OCC)	41

== Release history ==
Region	Date	Label
Worldwide	November 20, 2020	Super High Quality
