= Future Weather =

2010 EP by the War on Drugs

EP by The War on Drugs
- Released: October 26, 2010
- Genre: Indie rock, shoegazing
- Length: 28:06
- Label: Secretly Canadian
- Producer: Adam Granduciel

The War on Drugs chronology
Wagonwheel Blues (2008)	Future Weather (2010)	Slave Ambient (2011)

Future Weather is an EP by American indie rock band The War on Drugs, released on October 26, 2010 on Secretly Canadian. Released on both twelve-inch vinyl and as a digital download, the EP precedes the band's second studio album, Slave Ambient, which feature tracks from this release in a re-recorded state.

In early 2011, former member Kurt Vile praised the track, "Brothers", stating, "Adam Granduciel's one of my best friends, so it strikes a chord."

== Track listing ==
All songs written by Adam Granduciel.

1. "Come to the City #14" – 0:54
2. "Baby Missiles" – 3:29
3. "Comin' Through" – 3:21
4. "A Pile of Tires" – 3:51
5. "Comin' Around" – 0:55
6. "Brothers" – 5:13
7. "Missiles Reprise" – 2:19
8. "The History of Plastic" – 8:04

== Personnel ==
=== The War on Drugs ===
- Adam Granduciel – vocals, harmonica, acoustic and electric guitars, cassettes, synthesizers
- Dave Hartley – bass guitar, autoharp (2), Stratocaster (2), traps (6)
- Mike Zanghi – drums, percussion, Roland MC-202, bells, bowls, bi-phase treatments

=== Recording personnel ===
- Adam Granduciel – recording; mixing (1, 4–8)
- Jeff Zeigler – recording
- John Congleton – recording
- Brian McTear – mixing (2, 3)
- Johnny Low – mixing (2, 3)
- Paul Gold – mastering

=== Artwork ===
- Adam Granduciel – photography
- Daniel Murphy – layout
