= The War on Drugs (band) =

American rock band

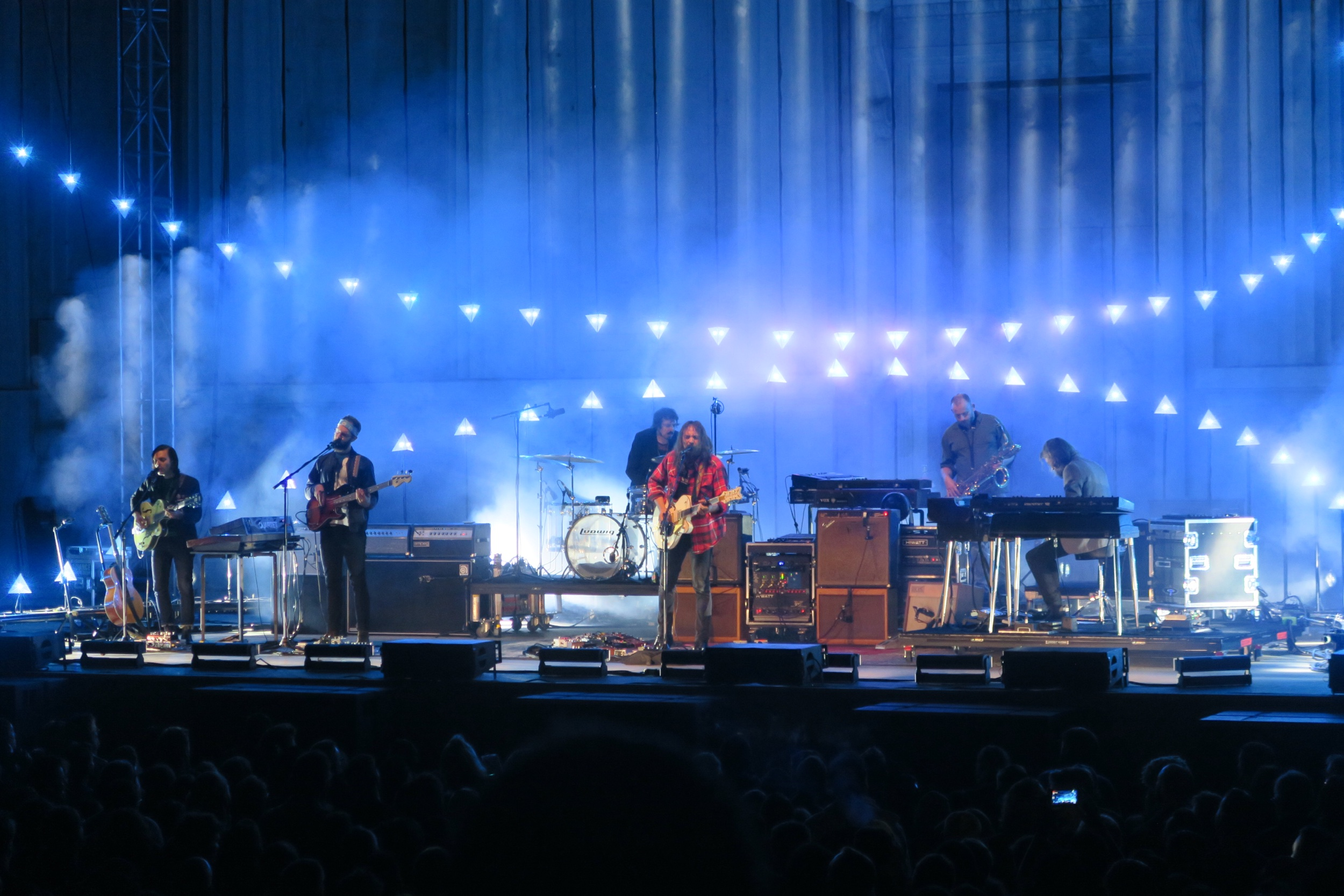
- The group performing at the Hearst Greek Theatre in Berkeley, California, 2017

Background information
- Origin: Philadelphia, Pennsylvania, U.S.
- Genres: Indie rock; heartland rock; neo-psychedelia; Americana
- Years active: 2005–present
- Labels: Secretly Canadian; Atlantic
- Members: Adam Granduciel; David Hartley; Robbie Bennett; Charlie Hall; Jon Natchez; Anthony LaMarca; Eliza Hardy Jones
- Past members: Kurt Vile; Kyle Lloyd; Mike Zanghi; Steven Urgo; Patrick Berkery
- Website: thewarondrugs.net

The War on Drugs is an American rock band from Philadelphia which was formed in 2005. The band consists of Adam Granduciel (vocals, guitar), David Hartley (bass guitar), Robbie Bennett (keyboards), Charlie Hall (drums), Jon Natchez (saxophone, keyboards), Anthony LaMarca (guitar), and Eliza Hardy Jones (percussion, keyboards).

Founded by close collaborators Granduciel and Kurt Vile, The War on Drugs released their debut studio album, Wagonwheel Blues, in 2008. Vile departed shortly after its release to focus on his solo career, with Granduciel serving as the band's sole constant member thereafter. The band's second studio album Slave Ambient was released in 2011 to favorable reviews and a lengthy tour. The band's third album, Lost in the Dream, was released in 2014 following extensive touring and a period of loneliness and clinical depression for primary songwriter Granduciel. The album was released to widespread critical acclaim and increased exposure.

Previous collaborator Hall joined the band as its full-time drummer during the recording process, with saxophonist Natchez and additional guitarist LaMarca accompanying the band for its world tour. Signing to Atlantic Records, the six-piece band released their fourth album, A Deeper Understanding, in 2017, which won the Grammy Award for Best Rock Album at the 60th Annual Grammy Awards. The band released their fifth album, I Don't Live Here Anymore, in 2021.

== History ==
=== Beginnings and Wagonwheel Blues (2003–2008) ===
In 2003, frontman Adam Granduciel moved from Oakland, California, to Philadelphia, where he met Kurt Vile, who had also recently moved back to Philadelphia after living in Boston for two years. The duo began writing, recording and performing music together. Vile remembered, "Adam was the first dude I met when I moved back to Philadelphia in 2003. We saw eye-to-eye on a lot of things. I was obsessed with Bob Dylan at the time, and we totally geeked-out on that. We started playing together in the early days and he would be in my band, the Violators. Then, eventually I played in The War On Drugs."

Granduciel and Vile began playing together as The War on Drugs in 2005. Regarding the band's name, Granduciel said, "My friend Julian and I came up with it a few years ago over a couple bottles of red wine and a few typewriters when we were living in Oakland. We were writing a lot back then, working on a dictionary, and it just came out and we were like 'hey, good band name' so eventually when I moved to Philadelphia and got a band together I used it. It was either that or The Rigatoni Danzas. I think we made the right choice. I always felt though that it was the kind of name I could record all sorts of different music under without any sort of predictability inherent in the name." While Vile and Granduciel formed the backbone of the band, they had a number of accompanists early in the group's career, before finally settling on a lineup adding Charlie Hall as a drummer and organist, Kyle Lloyd as a drummer, and Dave Hartley on bass. The group gave away its Barrel of Batteries EP for free early in 2008. Their debut LP for Secretly Canadian, Wagonwheel Blues, was released in 2008.

After the album's release and then a European tour, Vile departed from the band to focus on his solo career, saying, "I only went on the first European tour when their album came out, and then I basically left the band. I knew if I stuck with that, it would be all my time and my goal was to have my own musical career." Mike Zanghi, also a member of Kurt & the Violators, joined the band at the time with Vile. Vile said, "Mike was my drummer first and then when The War on Drugs' first record came out I thought I was lending Mike to Adam for the European tour but... he just played with them all the time so I kind of had to like, while they were touring a lot, figure out my own thing."

=== Slave Ambient (2008–2012) ===
The lineup had several changes and by the end of 2008, Kurt Vile, Charlie Hall, and Kyle Lloyd all had exited the group. At the time Granduciel and Hartley were joined by drummer Mike Zanghi, whom Granduciel played with in Kurt Vile's backing band, the Violators. After recording much of the band's forthcoming studio album, Slave Ambient, Zanghi quit the band in 2010. Drummer Steven Urgo joined the band, with keyboardist Robbie Bennett being added at about the same time. Regarding Zanghi's exit, Granduciel said, "I loved Mike. But you have things like friendship, and he's down to tour and he's a great guy."

In 2012, Patrick Berkery replaced Urgo as the band's drummer.

=== Lost in the Dream (2013–2015) ===
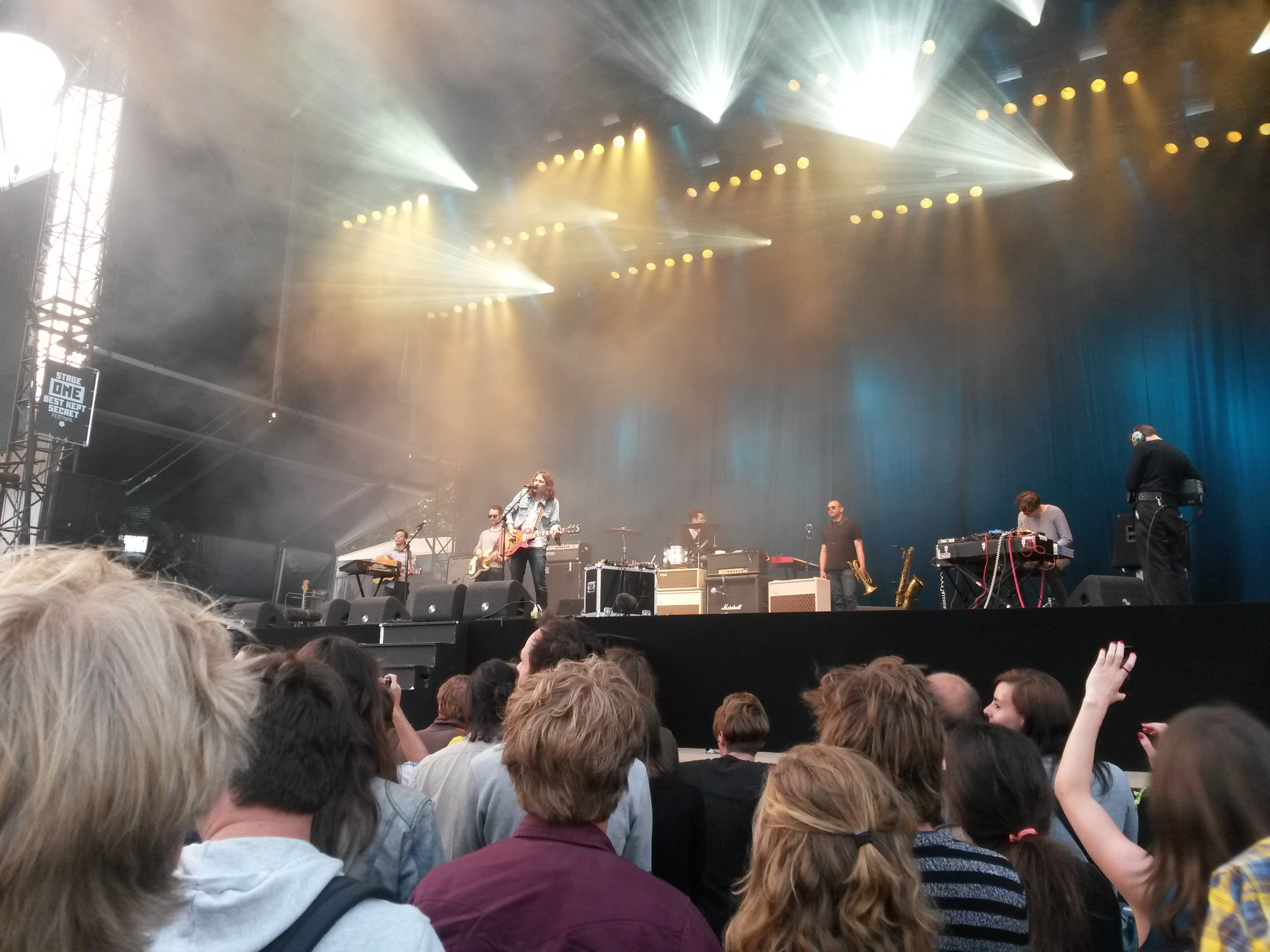
The War on Drugs at the Best Kept Secret festival in Hilvarenbeek, The Netherlands, 2014

On December 4, 2013, the band announced the upcoming release of its third studio album, Lost in the Dream (March 18, 2014). The band streamed the album in its entirety on NPR's First Listen site for a week before its release. Award-winning alt-country rocker Ryan Adams said on Twitter that Lost in the Dream was a perfect album.

Lost in the Dream was featured as the Vinyl Me, Please record of the month in August 2014. The pressing was a limited edition pressing on mint green colored vinyl.

=== A Deeper Understanding (2015–2021) ===
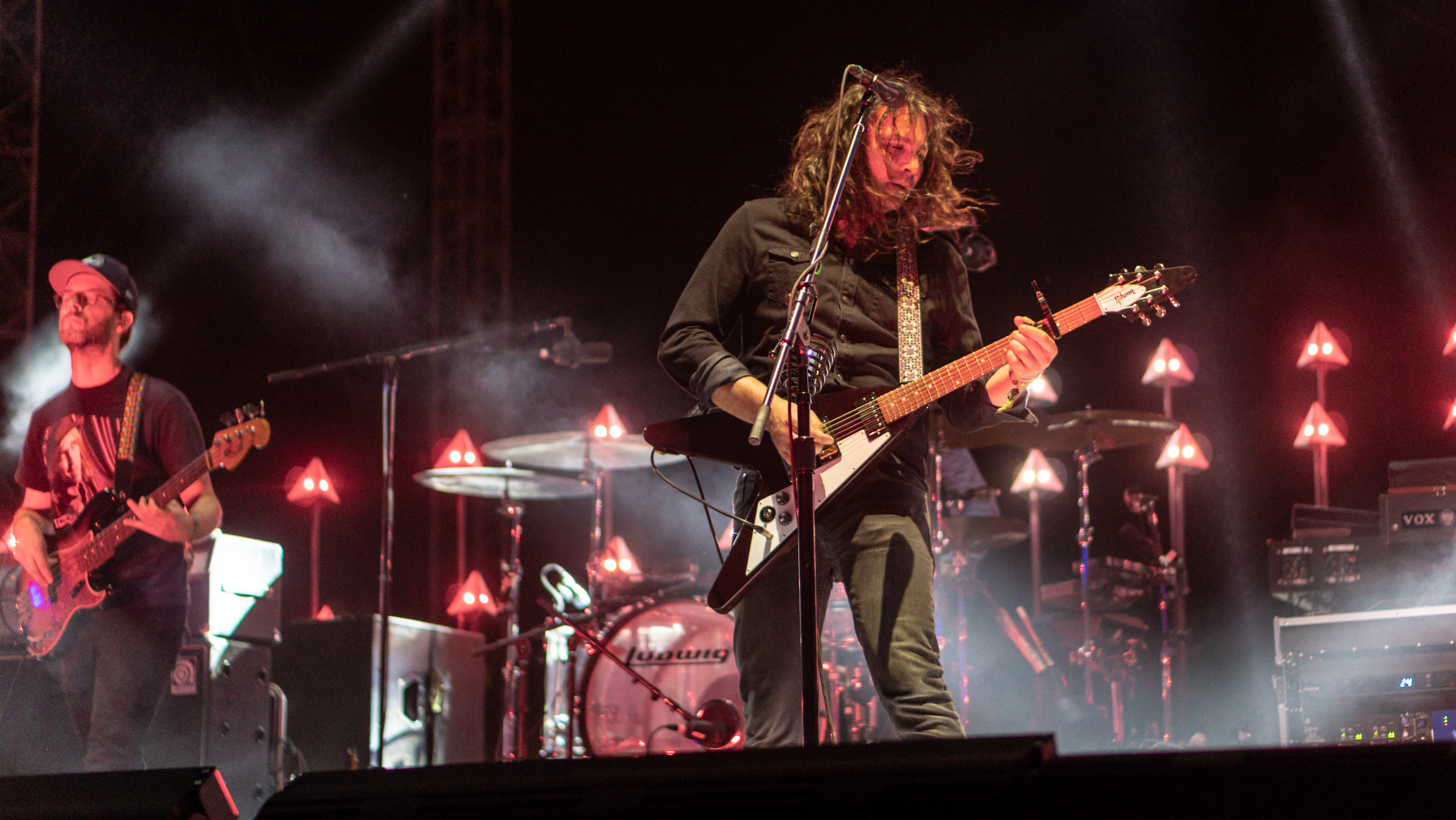
The band performing at Coachella in April 2018

In June 2015, The War on Drugs signed with Atlantic Records for a two-album deal.

On Record Store Day, April 22, 2017, The War on Drugs released their new single "Thinking of a Place". The single was produced by frontman Granduciel and Shawn Everett. April 28, 2017, The War on Drugs announced a fall 2017 tour in North America and Europe and that a new album was imminent. On June 1, 2017, a new song, "Holding On", was released, and it was announced that the album would be titled A Deeper Understanding and was released on August 25, 2017. "Holding On" was also used on the official soundtrack of EA Sports' FIFA 18. The 2017 tour began in September, opening in the band's hometown, Philadelphia, and it concluded in November in Sweden.

A Deeper Understanding was nominated for the International Album of the Year award at the 2018 UK Americana Awards. At the 60th Annual Grammy Awards, on January 28, 2018, A Deeper Understanding won the Grammy for Best Rock Album. On October 6, 2020, The War on Drugs announced a live album titled Live Drugs, which was released on November 20, 2020.

=== I Don't Live Here Anymore (2021–present) ===
The band released their fifth studio album, I Don't Live Here Anymore, on October 29, 2021. Along with the announcement of the album, they released a single and accompanying music video for the album's lead track, "Living Proof", with a 2022 tour announcement. The album was released to widespread critical acclaim, placing highly on several end-of-year lists. For the album's accompanying tour, keyboardist Eliza Hardy Jones, who previously played with bass guitarist Dave Hartley in his solo project, Nightlands, joined the band.

Throughout 2024, Granduciel produced the third studio album by the English singer–songwriter Sam Fender, People Watching (2025), and the sixth solo studio album by The Hold Steady's Craig Finn, Always Been (2025). Always Been featured Granduciel and The War on Drugs appearing as Finn's backing band throughout. Finn, former bandmate Kurt Vile, and Joe Walsh would join The War on Drugs to perform for their regular fundraiser "Drugcember" concerts at the end of 2025. "Lucy", a previously unreleased track from the band, made its live debut during Drugcember 2025.

In an interview published in April 2026, Granduciel had confirmed the band's upcoming sixth studio album was nearly finished. "Who's That" a new single, was teased by the band on September 8, 2026; and was made available on music streaming platforms at midnight the following day.

== Musical style ==
The band has been described as indie rock, heartland rock and neo-psychedelia, as well as Americana. Not only do they draw inspiration from artists like Bruce Springsteen, Talk Talk, and Granduciel's "favorite modern day band", Wilco, but they have inspired their own wave of guitar-forward, synth-layered indie rockers, sounding like the band Dire Straits.

== Side projects and collaborations ==
=== Kurt Vile & the Violators ===
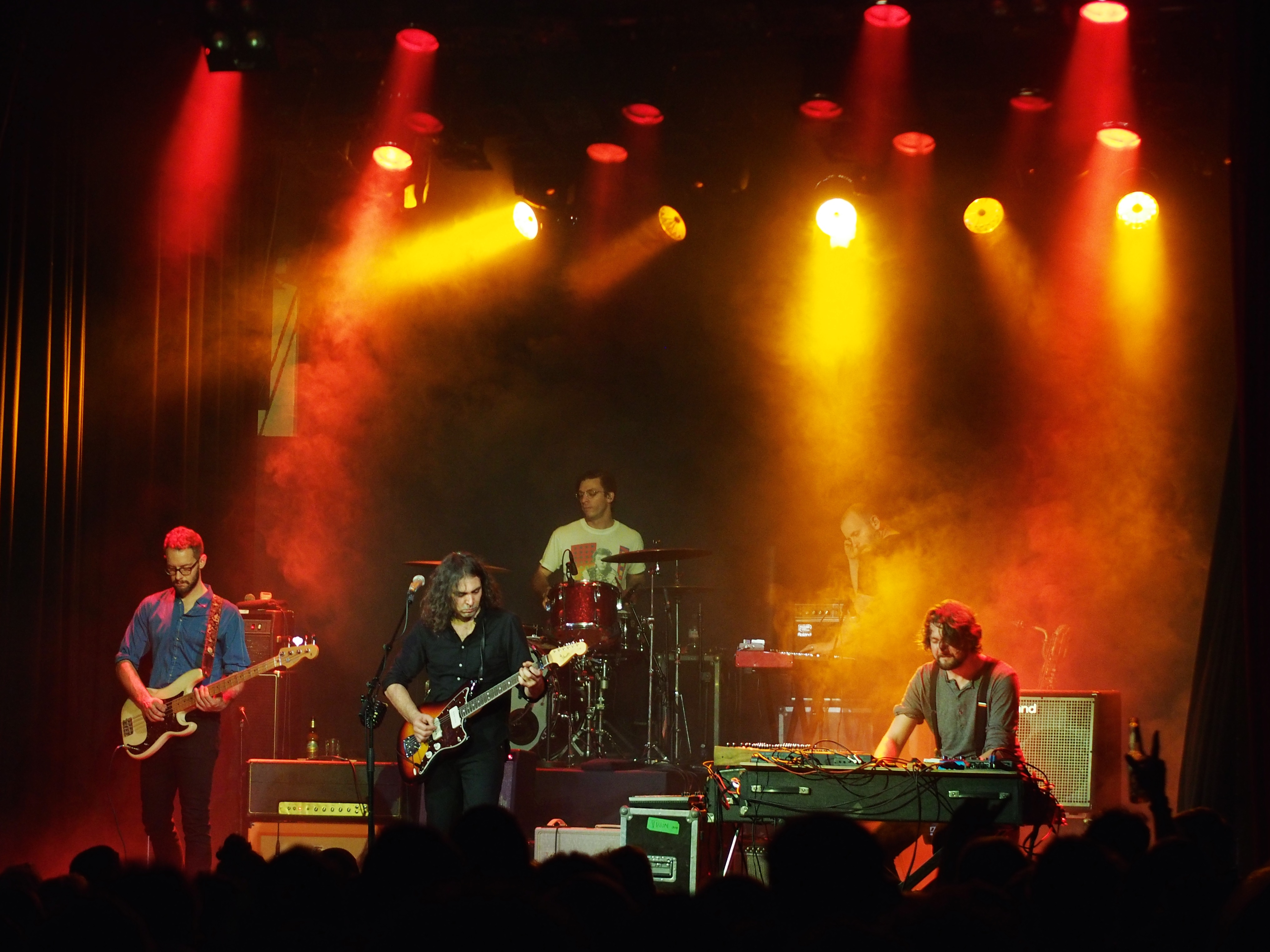
The War on Drugs performing at the Kaufleuten Club in Zurich, Switzerland, 2014

Granduciel and Zanghi are both former members of founding guitarist Vile's backing band The Violators, with Granduciel saying, "There was never, despite what lazy journalists have assumed, any sort of falling out, or resentment" after Vile left The War on Drugs. In 2011, Vile said, "When my record came out, I assumed Adam would want to focus on The War on Drugs but he came with us in The Violators when we toured the States. The Violators became a unit, and although the cast does rotate, we've developed an even tighter unity and sound. Adam is an incredible guitar player these days and there is a certain feeling [between us] that nobody else can tap into. We don't really have to tell each other what to play, it just happens."

=== Sharon Van Etten ===
Both Hartley and Granduciel contributed to singer-songwriter Sharon Van Etten's fourth studio album, Are We There (2014). Hartley performs bass guitar on the entire album, with Granduciel contributing guitar to the songs "Our Love" and "Every Time the Sun Comes Up".

=== Sore Eros ===
Granduciel produced Sore Eros's self-titled 2020 album.

=== Day of the Dead ===
In 2016, The War on Drugs contributed a cover of "Touch of Grey" for a Grateful Dead tribute album called Day of the Dead. The album was curated by The National's twin brothers, Aaron Dessner and Bryce Dessner. Granduciel had been curious about the Grateful Dead and other jam bands beginning when he attended a Phish concert.

=== Beyoncé ===
In 2024, Granduciel appeared on Beyoncé's eighth studio album, Cowboy Carter, performing electric guitar on the track, "II Most Wanted". The track was produced by The War on Drugs' producer Shawn Everett and featured Miley Cyrus dueting with Beyoncé.

=== Lucius ===
Lucius was the guest band on the title track from The War On Drugs' 2021 album I Don't Live Here Anymore, and Granduciel contributed vocals and guitar to the 2024 Lucius single "Old Tape".

=== Craig Finn ===
Granduciel produced the sixth solo studio album by The Hold Steady's Craig Finn, Always Been, released on April 4, 2025. The album features Granduciel and The War on Drugs appearing throughout as Finn's backing band.

== Members ==
Current members

- Adam Granduciel – lead vocals, lead guitar, harmonica, keyboards, sampler (2005–present)
- David Hartley – bass, rhythm guitar, backing vocals (2005–present)
- Robbie Bennett – keyboards, piano, rhythm guitar (2010–present)
- Charlie Hall – drums (2013–present), organ (2008)
- Jon Natchez – saxophone, keyboards (2014–present)
- Anthony LaMarca – rhythm guitar, keyboards, backing vocals (2014–present)
- Eliza Hardy Jones – keyboards, acoustic guitar, percussion, backing vocals (2021–present)

Former members

- Kurt Vile – rhythm guitar, keyboards, backing vocals (2005–2009)
- Kyle Lloyd – drums (2008)
- Mike Zanghi – drums, percussion, sampler (2008–2010)
- Steven Urgo – drums, percussion, sampler (2010–2012)
- Patrick Berkery – drums, percussion (2012–2013)

== Discography ==
=== Albums ===
==== Studio albums ====
List of studio albums, with selected chart positions, sales and certifications shown
Title	Details	Peak chart positions										Sales	Certifications
Title	Details	US	AUS	BEL (FL)	BEL (WA)	CAN	DEN	NLD	SWE	SWI	UK	Sales	Certifications
Wagonwheel Blues	Release: June 19, 2008; Label: Secretly Canadian	—	—	—	—	—	—	—	—	—	—		
Slave Ambient	Release: August 16, 2011; Label: Secretly Canadian	— (Note: Slave Ambient did not enter the US Billboard 200, but peaked at number 4 on the US Heatseekers Albums Chart.)	—	180	159	—	—	— (Note: Slave Ambient did not enter the Dutch Album Top 100, but peaked at number 24 on the Dutch Alternative Albums chart.)	—	—	127		
Lost in the Dream	Release: March 18, 2014; Label: Secretly Canadian	26	28	3	69	—	19	18	26	66	18	US: 350,675	BPI: Gold
A Deeper Understanding	Release: August 25, 2017; Label: Atlantic	10	5	1	9	8	10	2	6	11	3	US: 213,032	BEA: Gold; BPI: Silver; NVPI: Gold
I Don't Live Here Anymore	Release: October 29, 2021; Label: Atlantic	22	21	3	5	33	5	3	16	6	6		
"—" denotes a recording that did not chart or was not released in that territory.

==== Live albums ====
List of live albums, with selected chart positions
Title	Details	Peak chart positions									
Title	Details	US	US Indie	US Rock	BEL (FL)	BEL (WA)	GER	NLD	SCO	UK	UK Indie
Future Blues: The War On Drugs Live 2005 - 2011	Release: 2011	—	—	—	—	—	—	—	—	—	—
Live Drugs	Release: November 20, 2020; Label: Super High Quality	— (Note: "Live Drugs" did not enter the Billboard 200, but peaked at number 31 on the Billboard Top Album Sales Chart.)	41	35	6	73	74	17	41	— (Note: Live Drugs did not enter the UK Albums Chart, but peaked at number 39 on the UK Album Downloads Chart.)	12
Live Drugs Again	Release: September 13, 2024	—	—	—	64	—	—	—	—	—	—
"—" denotes a recording that did not chart or was not released in that territory.

=== EPs ===
Title	Details
Barrel of Batteries	Release: March 4, 2008; Label: Secretly Canadian
Future Weather	Release: October 26, 2010; Label: Secretly Canadian

=== Singles ===
Title	Year	Peak chart positions										Certifications	Album
Title	Year	US Rock	BEL (FL)	BEL (WA)	CAN Rock	GER DL	ICE	MEX Air.	NLD	SWI Air.	UK	Certifications	Album
"Taking the Farm"	2008	—	—	—	—	—	—	—	—	—	—		Wagonwheel Blues
"Baby Missiles"	2011	—	—	—	—	—	—	—	—	—	—		Slave Ambient
"Come to the City"	2011	—	—	—	—	—	—	—	—	—	— (Note: "Come to the City" did not enter the UK Singles Chart, but peaked at number 73 on the UK Physical Singles Chart.)		Slave Ambient
"Best Night"	2012	—	—	—	—	—	—	—	—	—	—		Slave Ambient
"Red Eyes"	2013	—	37	— (Note: "Red Eyes" did not enter the Wallonia Ultratop 50, but peaked at number 41 on the Ultratip chart.)	—	—	—	48	— (Note: "Red Eyes" did not enter the Netherlands' Single Top 100 but peaked on the Netherlands' Single Tip Chart at number 1.)	—	—	BPI: Silver; RIAA: Gold	Lost in the Dream
"Under the Pressure"	2014	— (Note: "Under the Pressure" did not enter the Hot Rock Songs chart, but peaked at number 19 on the Adult Alternative Songs chart.)	— (Note: "Under the Pressure" did not enter the Flanders Ultratop 50, but peaked at number 2 on the Ultratip chart.)	—	—	—	—	—	—	—	—		Lost in the Dream
"Burning"	2014	—	— (Note: "Burning" did not enter the Flanders Ultratop 50, but peaked at number 6 on the Ultratip chart.)	—	—	—	—	—	—	—	—		Lost in the Dream
"Eyes to the Wind"	2014	—	—	—	—	—	—	—	—	—	—		Lost in the Dream
"An Ocean in Between the Waves"	2015	—	—	—	—	—	—	—	—	—	—		Lost in the Dream
"Thinking of a Place"	2017	—	37	—	—	—	—	23	—	—	— (Note: "Thinking of a Place" did not enter the UK Singles Chart, but peaked at number 10 on the UK Physical Singles Chart.)		A Deeper Understanding
"Holding On"	2017	— (Note: "Holding On" did not enter the Hot Rock Songs chart, but peaked at number 34 on the Rock Airplay chart.)	— (Note: "Holding On" did not enter the Flanders Ultratop 50, but peaked at number 10 on the Ultratip chart.)	— (Note: "Holding On" did not enter the Wallonia Ultratop 50, but peaked at number 35 on the Ultratip chart.)	44	—	—	—	—	90	—		A Deeper Understanding
"Strangest Thing"	2017	—	— (Note: "Strangest Thing" did not enter the Flanders Ultratop 50, but peaked at number 14 on the Ultratip chart.)	—	—	—	—	—	—	—	—		A Deeper Understanding
"Pain"	2017	49	— (Note: "Pain" did not enter the Flanders Ultratop 50, but peaked at number 24 on the Ultratip chart.)	—	46	—	18	—	—	—	—		A Deeper Understanding
"Up All Night"	2017	—	—	—	—	—	—	—	—	—	—		A Deeper Understanding
"Nothing to Find"	2018	—	— (Note: "Nothing to Find" did not enter the Flanders Ultratop 50, but peaked at number 9 on the Ultratip chart.)	— (Note: "Nothing to Find" did not enter the Wallonia Ultratop 50, but charted as an "extra tip" on the Ultratip chart.)	—	—	—	—	—	—	—		A Deeper Understanding
"Living Proof"	2021	—	—	—	—	—	—	—	—	—	—		I Don't Live Here Anymore
"I Don't Live Here Anymore" (featuring Lucius)	2021	43	—	—	38	77	39	—	— (Note: "I Don't Live Here Anymore" did not enter the Netherlands' Single Top 100 but peaked on the Netherlands' Airplay Chart at number 24.)	79	— (Note: "I Don't Live Here Anymore" did not enter the UK Singles Chart, but peaked at number 95 on the UK Singles Downloads Chart.)		I Don't Live Here Anymore
"Change"	2021	— (Note: "Change" did not enter the Hot Rock Songs chart, but peaked at number 30 on the Adult Alternative Songs chart.)	—	—	—	—	—	—	—	—	—		I Don't Live Here Anymore
"Who's That"	2026	—	48	—	—	—	—	*	— (Note: "Who's That" did not enter the Netherlands' Single Top 100 but peaked on the Netherlands' Airplay Chart at number 24.)	—	—		TBA
"—" denotes a recording that did not chart or was not released in that territory. "*" denotes that the chart did not exist at that time.

=== Other charted songs ===
Title	Year	Peak chart positions		Album
Title	Year	BEL (FL)	BEL (WA)	Album
"In Chains"	2018	— (Note: "In Chains" did not enter the Flanders Ultratop 50, but charted as an "extra tip" on the Ultratip chart.)	— (Note: "In Chains" did not enter the Wallonia Ultratop 50, but charted as an "extra tip" on the Ultratip chart.)	A Deeper Understanding
"Pain (Live)"	2020	— (Note: "Pain (Live)" did not enter the Flanders Ultratop 50, but charted as an "extra tip" on the Ultratip chart.)	—	Live Drugs
"—" denotes a recording that did not chart or was not released in that territory.

== Awards and nominations ==
=== Grammy Awards ===
Year	Nominee / work	Award	Result	Ref.
2018	A Deeper Understanding	Best Rock Album	Won	
2023	"Harmonia's Dream"	Best Rock Song	Nominated	

=== Sweden GAFFA Awards ===
Delivered since 2010, the GAFFA Awards (Swedish: GAFFA Priset) are a Swedish award that rewards popular music awarded by the magazine of the same name.

Year	Nominee / work	Award	Result	Ref.
2018	The War on Drugs	Best Foreign Band	Nominated	
