= Anthony LaMarca =

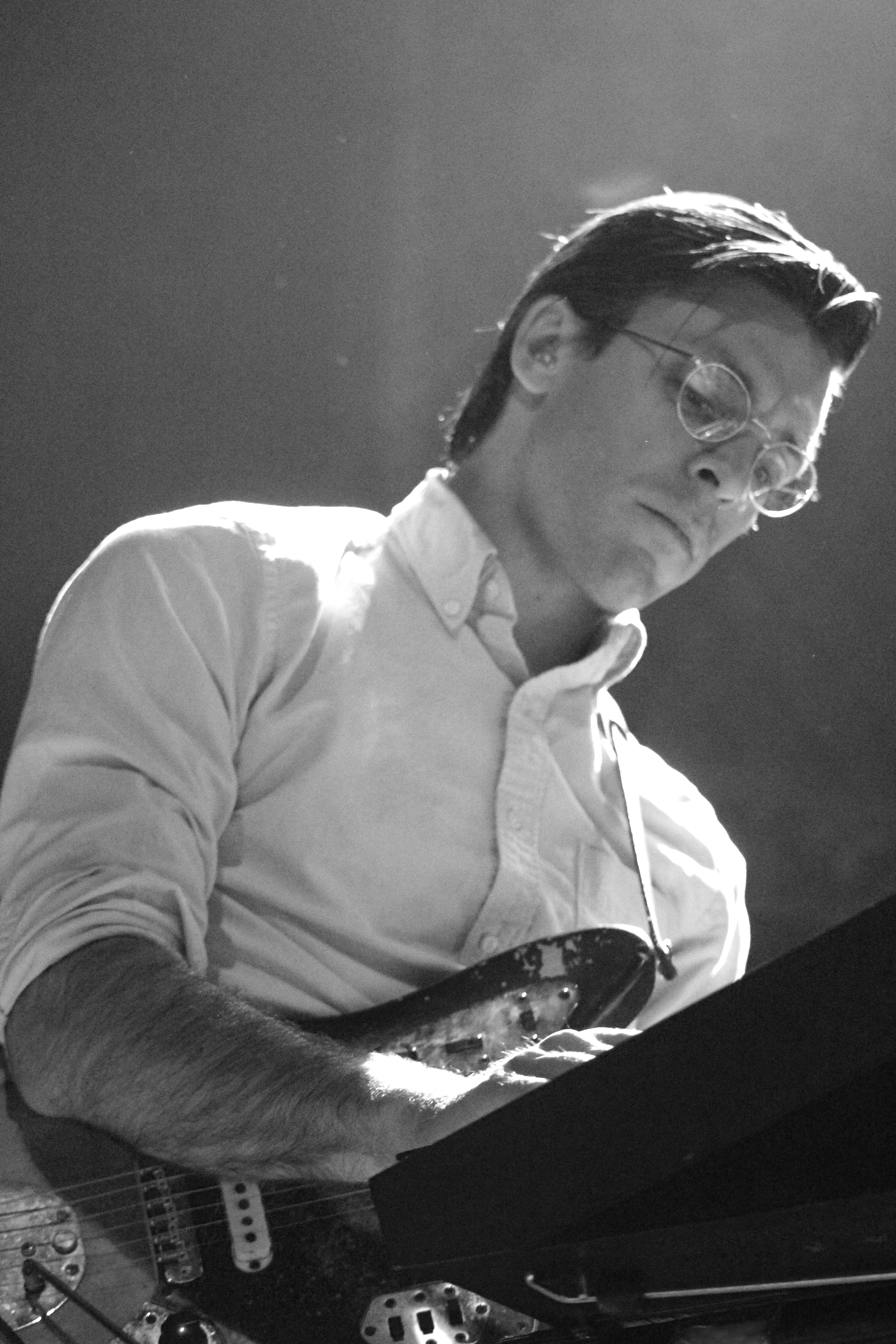
- LaMarca performing with the War on Drugs in 2014

Background information
- Occupations: Singer-songwriter, multi-instrumentalist
- Instruments: Guitar, vocals, drums, keyboards
- Years active: 2009–present
- Labels: Primary Records
- Website: primaryrecords.org

Anthony LaMarca is a drummer, guitarist, singer-songwriter, multi-instrumentalist, and co-founder of Primary Records. He is currently a member of the War on Drugs, having joined the band on its tour in support of its third studio album, Lost in the Dream (2014), then contributing to their follow-up, A Deeper Understanding (2017), and I Don't Live Here Anymore (2021).

Native to Youngstown, Ohio, LaMarca took part in the local music scene. Promptly upon graduating from The New School for Jazz and Contemporary Music in 2009, LaMarca joined St. Vincent as drummer and toured extensively in support of her Actor release. Annie Clark (of St. Vincent) is quoted saying: "Anthony LaMarca is [a] boy wonder, boy genius. He graduated from college and then the next day he went on tour with me, forever. He's just a delight. He's so funny. He came in and tried out and he's just like, everything about what he did was meticulous. Like, he had a very good sounding snare and he brought it. Everything about it—about him—you could tell there was care and thought put into everything he did." His style has also been referred to as a "laid-back Levon Helm-style pocket to rigid Kraftwerkian tick-tock[…]."

He worked with Dean & Britta's project of scoring songs "to accompany Warhol's silent film portraits he shot from 1964 to 1966 at his New York City studio The Factory."

LaMarca co-founded Primary Records with his friend Oren Kessler in 2011 in Brooklyn, New York. On the label is LaMarca's band The Building: a group spawned from his Youngstown roots, including his brother Angelo, wife Megan, and other long time collaborators. LaMarca stated that The Building is "getting ready to release their record The Swooshy Businessman. While this album is not available online, LaMarca began recording and releasing music exclusively recorded at Peppermint Productions. First, Reconciliation (Peppermint Records, 2017), then Petra (Peppermint Records, Concord Records, 2019), Indianola Pizza Dough (Peppermint Records, 2021), and Aspiration (Peppermint Records, 2024).

LaMarca has toured supporting St. Vincent, The Building, Gym Deer, Pony of Good Tidings, Dean Wareham, Dean & Britta, Spoon, and JBM.
