= Barrel of Batteries =

EP by The War on Drugs
- Released: March 4, 2008
- Genre: Indie rock, pop
- Length: 14:50
- Language: English
- Label: Secretly Canadian

The War on Drugs chronology
Barrel of Batteries (2008)	Wagonwheel Blues (2008)

Barrel of Batteries is the first EP released by American indie rock band The War on Drugs, released on March 4, 2008, on Secretly Canadian. The release featured five demos that the band was particularly drawn to. Upon its release, the band gave downloads of the EP away for free for a limited time.

The EP was recorded on lead singer Adam Granduciel's digital 8-track. His vocals have been described as "a modern Bruce Springsteen that had inherited Bob Dylan's vocal cadences as guitarist Kurt Vile sprinkled twinkling guitar around the edge."

== Track listing ==
All tracks are written by Adam Granduciel.

No.	Title	Length
1.	"Set Yr Sights"	0:49
2.	"Arms Like Boulders"	5:27
3.	"Pushing Corn"	4:03
4.	"Toxic City #26"	0:19
5.	"Buenos Aires Beach"	3:29
6.	"Sweet Thing Reprise"	0:43
