= I Don't Live Here Anymore =

2021 studio album by the War on Drugs

Studio album by The War on Drugs
- Released: October 29, 2021
- Recorded: 2018–2021
- Studios: Outlier Inn (Woodridge, New York); Studio G (Brooklyn); Electric Lady (Manhattan); Electro-Vox, Sound City, Sunset Sound, EastWest (Hollywood)
- Length: 52:16
- Label: Atlantic
- Producers: Adam Granduciel; Shawn Everett

The War on Drugs chronology
| A Deeper Understanding (2017) | I Don't Live Here Anymore (2021) | Live Drugs Again (2024) |

Singles from I Don't Live Here Anymore
- 1. "Living Proof" Released: July 19, 2021; 2. "I Don't Live Here Anymore" Released: September 15, 2021; 3. "Change" Released: October 26, 2021

I Don't Live Here Anymore is the fifth studio album by American indie rock band The War on Drugs. It was released on October 29, 2021, through Atlantic Records. The album received widespread acclaim, with one of its songs, "Harmonia's Dream", receiving a nomination for Best Rock Song at the 65th Annual Grammy Awards.

== Recording ==
I Don't Live Here Anymore was recorded at seven different studios over the course of three years. The album was co-produced by frontman Adam Granduciel and engineer Shawn Everett. Granduciel moved to Los Angeles at the end of 2014, but spent most of 2018 living in New York City. In March 2018, while still on tour in support of the band's fourth album A Deeper Understanding (2017), Granduciel began work on the album at Outlier Inn studio in Upstate New York. He spent a week there demoing songs with bassist Dave Hartley and multi-instrumentalist Anthony LaMarca. In between touring, Granduciel also spent time writing and recording at Studio G in Brooklyn. At the end of 2018, the band spent a week recording at Electric Lady Studios in downtown Manhattan. Granduciel spent 2019 in Los Angeles, and recorded with band at Electro-Vox Recording Studios in May 2019. Granduciel and Everett separated in March 2020 as a result of the COVID-19 pandemic. They reunited in October 2020 at Sound City Studios, where they recorded for three weeks. Recording also took place at Sunset Sound Recorders and EastWest Studios.

The songs on I Don't Live Here Anymore were all reimagined, rewritten and/or remixed multiple times over the course of the album's three-year recording process. Once the album was given a "final" mixing and was mastered by Greg Calbi, Granduciel decided to change the mixes of several songs. After a month of revision, Atlantic Records pushed back its release date. One day, Granduciel arranged a final session with Everett to complete the album. They spent twelve hours in Everett's studio remixing several tracks, and then remastered those songs themselves.

== Release ==
The band announced the album on July 19, 2021, simultaneously releasing the single "Living Proof" with an accompanying video directed by Emmett Malloy. The album's title track, which features Lucius, was released on September 15, 2021, also with a video directed by Malloy. "Change" was released on October 26, 2021. I Don't Live Here Anymore was released on October 29, 2021, through Atlantic Records. It follows their Grammy Award-winning album A Deeper Understanding and is the second record of a two-album deal with Atlantic. A deluxe version of the album, featuring the tracks "Oceans of Darkness" and "Slow Ghost", was released in September 2022.

== Critical reception ==
Professional ratings
Aggregate scores
| Source | Rating |
|---|---|
| AnyDecentMusic? | 8.0/10 |
| Metacritic | 85/100 |
Review scores
| Source | Rating |
| AllMusic | 4/5 stars |
| Classic Rock | 7/10 |
| DIY | 3.5/5 stars |
| Exclaim! | 8/10 |
| Mojo | 4/5 stars |
| NME | 5/5 stars |
| The Observer | 4/5 stars |
| Pitchfork | 8.4/10 |
| Rolling Stone | 3.5/5 stars |
| Uncut | 8/10 |

I Don't Live Here Anymore received acclaim from music critics. At Metacritic, which assigns a normalized rating out of 100 to reviews from mainstream critics, the album received an average score of 85, based on 25 reviews, indicating "universal acclaim". Aggregator AnyDecentMusic? gave it 8.0 out of 10, based on their assessment of the critical consensus. Rhys Buchanan of NME gave the album 5 out of 5 stars, writing, "There's magic everywhere you look on this triumph of an album." Mark Beaumont of Classic Rock wrote that the album is "at its most immersive when they strip the moodscapes back to piano, glacial atmospherics and cracked emotion on 'Living Proof', 'Rings Around My Father's Eyes' and the rousing 'Old Skin', allowing a little fragility to tint their mist blue." Writing for Beats Per Minute, John Amen concluded, "There’s something ungraspable about their music: referential yet original, derivative yet prototypical, memorable yet oddly irretrievable. Ponderous yet transcendent. A listener is invited to encounter the assorted boundaries of their own preferences, biases, identity – to let those hard lines dissolve." Sharon O'Connell of Uncut wrote, "The War On Drugs have fine-tuned their hybrid of American drivetime classicism and kosmische on I Don't Live Here Anymore and buffed it to a warm sheen."

=== Year-end lists ===
I Don't Live Here Anymore on year-end lists
| Publication | List | Rank | Ref. |
|---|---|---|---|
| Billboard | The 50 Best Albums of 2021 | 40 | |
| Entertainment Weekly | The 10 best albums of 2021 | 2 | |
| The Guardian | The 50 best albums of 2021 | 34 | |
| Mojo | The 75 Best Albums of 2021 | 17 | |
| NME | The 50 best albums of 2021 | 12 | |
| Paste | The 50 Best Albums of 2021 | 20 | |
| Pitchfork | The 50 Best Albums of 2021 | 34 | |
| Spin | The 30 Best Albums of 2021 | 13 | |
| Stereogum | The 50 Best Albums of 2021 | 1 | |
| Uncut | The Top 75 Albums of the Year | 8 | |

== Track listing ==
All lyrics are written by Adam Granduciel; all music is composed by Adam Granduciel, except where noted.

| No. | Title | Music | Length |
|---|---|---|---|
| 1. | "Living Proof" | | 4:53 |
| 2. | "Harmonia's Dream" | Adam Granduciel; Robbie Bennett | 6:26 |
| 3. | "Change" | Granduciel; Anthony LaMarca; Dave Hartley | 6:04 |
| 4. | "I Don't Wanna Wait" | Granduciel; LaMarca; Hartley | 5:13 |
| 5. | "Victim" | | 6:00 |
| 6. | "I Don't Live Here Anymore" (featuring Lucius) | Granduciel; Bennett | 5:27 |
| 7. | "Old Skin" | | 4:52 |
| 8. | "Wasted" | | 4:10 |
| 9. | "Rings Around My Father's Eyes" | | 4:17 |
| 10. | "Occasional Rain" | | 4:54 |
| Total length: | | | 52:16 |

Deluxe edition bonus tracks
| No. | Title | Length |
|---|---|---|
| 11. | "Oceans of Darkness" | 3:35 |
| 12. | "Slow Ghost" | 3:10 |
| Total length: | | 59:01 |

== Personnel ==
The War on Drugs

- Adam Granduciel – vocals (all tracks), acoustic guitar (1–3, 7–10), lead electric guitar (1, 4–6), piano (1, 4, 6), Juno-106 (1, 4, 5), celesta (1, 8), electric guitar (2, 3, 7–10), synth guitar (2), bass (2, 6), Juno-60 (2, 5, 7, 8), Hammond organ (2, 3, 9), percussion (2, 4, 8), Wurlitzer (4, 5, 10), Kurzweil (4, 6), Prophet-6 (4), MPC (5), 808 drum programming (5), Korg K2 (6), Walter Becker's old bass (7), felt piano (7), harmonica (7), ARP Quartet (8), Mellotron (9, 10), lead guitar [outro] (10), production, art direction
- Dave Hartley – bass (1, 2, 4–6, 8–10), VP-330 (2, 5), Rickenbacker bass (3), electric guitar (4), OP-1 (9), cover and gatefold photography
- Robbie Bennett – piano (1, 2, 5, 8–10), Prophet 12 (2), Akai AX60 (2), Oberheim OB-X (4), New Jersey electric guitar (6), Juno 60 (6), Eventide piano (7), ARP Solina (9)
- Charlie Hall – drums (5, 7), percussion (5–7), prepared piano (8)
- Anthony LaMarca – drums (1, 3, 4, 9), Hammond organ (1), percussion (3, 4, 9, 10), electric vibes (4), electric guitar (4), pedal steel guitar (9), acoustic guitar (10)
- Jon Natchez – Prophet-6 (1), baritone saxophone (2, 4, 5, 8), Hammond organ (4), Wurlitzer (9)

Additional musicians

- Michael Bloch – Mellotron (1), nylon AMS dub guitar (2), Ursa Major Telecaster (3), electric guitar (4), electric swamp guitar (5), lead electric guitar (9), lead electric raindrop guitar (10)
- James Elkington – lead electric guitar (2), lead acoustic guitar (2)
- Patrick Berkery – drums (2, 8, 10), percussion (2, 8, 10)
- Lee Pardini – grand piano (3, 7), piano (8)
- Christopher Bear – drums (5), percussion (5)
- Matt Lowell – background vocals (5)
- Lucius – vocals (6)
- Eric Slick – drums (6), percussion (6)
- Sam KS – drums (6), percussion (6)
- Daniel Clarke – Hammond organ (7), organ (8)

Technical

- Shawn Everett – production, mixing, recording
- Greg Calbi – mastering
- Ivan Wayman – additional engineering
- Nick Krill – additional engineering
- Quarantine Cowboys – additional engineering
- Steve Fallone – mastering assistance

Artwork and design

- Rob Carmichael (SEEN) – art direction, design
- Dominic East – art direction
- Daniel Topete – additional studio photography
- Dustin Condren – additional studio photography

== Charts ==
=== Weekly charts ===
Weekly chart performance for I Don't Live Here Anymore
| Chart (2021) | Peak position |
|---|---|
| Australian Albums (ARIA) | 21 |
| Austrian Albums (Ö3 Austria) | 15 |
| Belgian Albums (Ultratop Flanders) | 3 |
| Belgian Albums (Ultratop Wallonia) | 5 |
| Canadian Albums (Billboard) | 33 |
| Danish Albums (Hitlisten) | 5 |
| Dutch Albums (Album Top 100) | 3 |
| Finnish Albums (Suomen virallinen lista) | 16 |
| French Albums (SNEP) | 109 |
| German Albums (Offizielle Top 100) | 15 |
| Greek Albums (IFPI) | 3 |
| Hungarian Albums (MAHASZ) | 7 |
| Irish Albums (Official Charts) | 4 |
| New Zealand Albums (RMNZ) | 27 |
| Norwegian Albums (VG-lista) | 3 |
| Portuguese Albums (AFP) | 10 |
| Scottish Albums (Official Charts) | 4 |
| Swedish Albums (Sverigetopplistan) | 16 |
| Swiss Albums (Schweizer Hitparade) | 6 |
| UK Albums (Official Charts) | 6 |
| US Billboard 200 | 22 |
| US Top Alternative Albums (Billboard) | 2 |
| US Top Rock Albums (Billboard) | 3 |

=== Year-end charts ===
2021 year-end chart performance for I Don't Live Here Anymore
| Chart (2021) | Position |
|---|---|
| Belgian Albums (Ultratop Flanders) | 44 |
| Dutch Albums (Album Top 100) | 99 |

2022 year-end chart performance for I Don't Live Here Anymore
| Chart (2022) | Position |
|---|---|
| Belgian Albums (Ultratop Flanders) | 67 |
