= Minimoog Voyager =

Monophonic analogue synthesizer

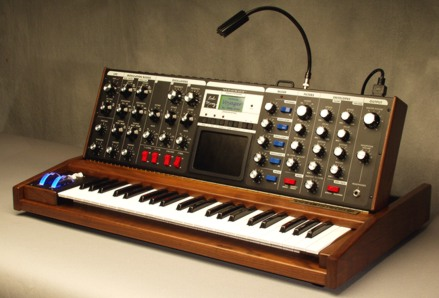
- Manufacturer: Moog Music
- Dates: 1997(Minimoog Voyager Electric Blue edition), 2002 – 2015
- Price: US$2995 – US$4995

Technical specifications
- Polyphony: Monophonic
- Timbrality: Monotimbral
- Oscillator: 3 VCOs
- LFO: independent LFO
- Synthesis type: Analog Subtractive
- Filter: dual lowpass or highpass/lowpass with cutoff, resonance, spacing ADSR envelope generator, keyboard tracking
- Attenuator: ADSR envelope generator
- Aftertouch expression: yes
- Velocity expression: yes
- Storage memory: 128 presets expandable to 896
- Effects: 2 modulation busses

Input/output
- Keyboard: 44-note with velocity and aftertouch sensitivity
- Left-hand control: pitch bend and mod wheels
- External control: MIDI, 14 CV/Gate inputs

The Minimoog Voyager or Voyager is a monophonic analog synthesizer, designed by Robert Moog and released in 2002 by Moog Music. The Voyager was modeled after the classic Minimoog synthesizer that was popular in the 1970s, and is meant to be a successor to that instrument.

== History ==
In an interview in 1998, Moog Music (then Big Briar) founder Robert (Bob) Moog announced that he planned to release an updated version of the Minimoog. The new synthesizer promised to have modern features, yet continue to be authentic to the original sound quality. The development process took several years, with a non-working concept model first shown to the public at the 2000 NAMM Show and garnering significant interest. The company offered a new synthesizer to the customer who came up with a name for the project. The Minimoog Voyager was officially released in 2002, and over its product lifetime shipped well over 14,000 units, slightly surpassing the sales figures of the original Minimoog.

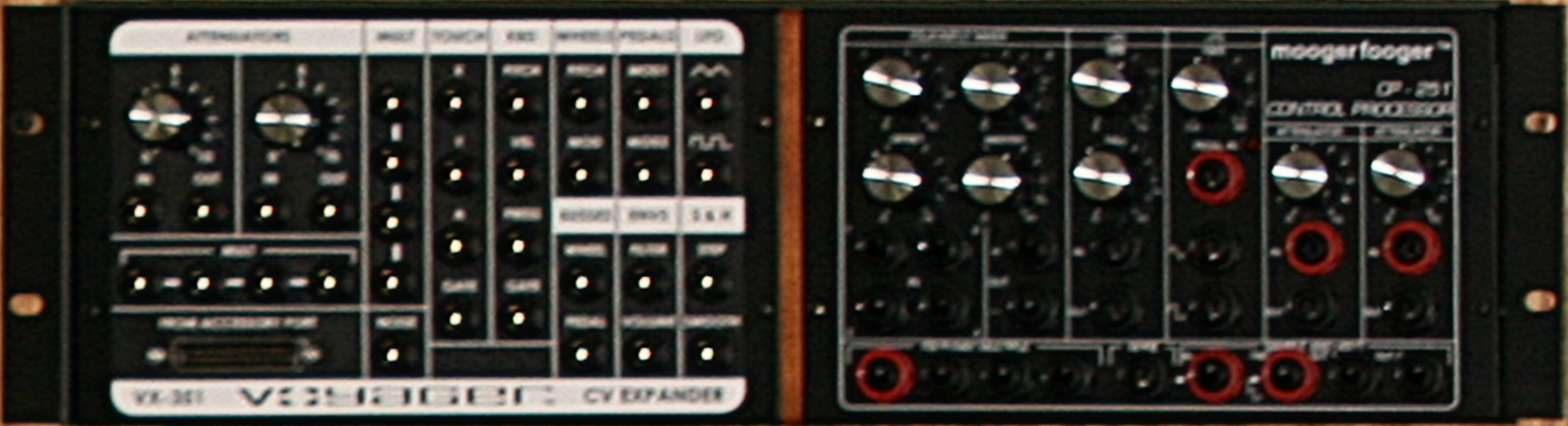
VX-351 CV Expander and CP-251 Control Processor

Late in the summer of 2002, Moog Music began shipping the new Voyagers. Over its product lifespan from 2002 to 2015, many variants were shipped, with a variety of cosmetic options including backlit front panels and wheels, custom cabinet woods and finishes, and custom-colored switches and other hardware (see below).

Occasionally a new system software release is made available, which can be downloaded from Moog Music's website and sent to the Voyager via MIDI. Recent software versions allow complex internal patching of control voltages, a very powerful and convenient feature for the user. Also available is the VX-351 Voyager Expander, an external box that is wired to the Voyager featuring 25 control-voltage outputs for physical CV patching.

Recent versions of the Voyager software expand the original 128-patch memory to 896 patches by implementing seven selectable banks, A to G, with 128 patches each. The current model (2007) has most of the patches pre-programmed in groups corresponding to earlier software releases.

In September 2015, Moog Music announced that after 13 years of production and over 14,000 units sold, sales of the Voyager would be discontinued.

== Models ==
The first 600 units could be preordered at the price of US$3495 and featured Bob Moog's autograph. The standard edition continued to sell for US$2995. Apart from the signature and price, the models were identical. Wood finish on the models was offered in walnut, cherry or maple.

For 2004, Moog Music released a limited 50th Anniversary Edition Voyager. The wood cabinet was painted black and the control panel was backlit using electroluminescent technology. 2005 marked the end of production of these units, while Moog Music continued to sell a backlit model called the Electric Blue that featured an iridescent blue cabinet finish. Both of these models had the same features as the non-backlit models but sold for US$3295. From 2006 they offered a customizable version of the Electric Blue named the Select Series, in which the customer could choose between mahogany, electric blue, traditional ash, white wash, maple, black, cherry, and walnut cabinets with red, blue, white, orange, green, or purple backlighting. Their retail price was the same as that of the Electric Blue model.

In 2005, Moog Music released the Voyager Rack Mount Edition (RME), a synthesizer based on the Voyager. The RME was designed to occupy 5 spaces in a 19-inch rack. The model had all of the features of other Voyagers except the touch panel control and keyboard. The RME was designed to be controlled via MIDI. Up to 16 RME Voyagers could be combined to achieve polyphony.

In 2008, Moog Music released the Minimoog Voyager Old School. (Voyager OS). The Voyager OS had enhanced modulation busses with more sources on the panel to compensate for the lack of software and an operating system. The Voyager OS also did not have a touch pad or MIDI inputs and outputs. Unlike other Voyagers, it featured a keyboard pitch CV out and keyboard gate CV out, without the aid of the VX-351. The Voyager OS's pitch bender was set to +/- 7 semitones, and could be modified by an internal jumper. The OS was sold with one wood panelling option, "traditional ash". However, a few limited edition models were housed in white wash cabinets. The Voyager Old School was discontinued in 2009.

In 2010, for the 40th anniversary of the Minimoog Model D, Moog Music released the Minimoog Voyager XL model. It was an expanded Voyager that included, in addition to the original Voyager features, a five octave 61-note keyboard, a ribbon controller, an additional Six Waveform LFO with positive and negative outputs, a Lag Processor, two Attenuators with Offset Control, a four by one Mixer also with Offset Control, and most notably, a patch bay on the far left of the instrument—providing a similar modular functionality to the VX-series products.

In 2012 to commemorate the 10th anniversary of the Voyager, Moog made a limited run of 31 units that were dipped in 24-karat gold, finished in Black Piano Lacquered Wood with Japanese Awabi Pearl inlayed sides and translucent rotary knobs. One was given away and the others were distributed for sale worldwide. The 10th Anniversary Gold Minimoog Voyager is one of the rarest synthesizers. Its Manufacturers Suggested Retail Price was $15,000.
