= The Dove & The Wolf =

American pop duo

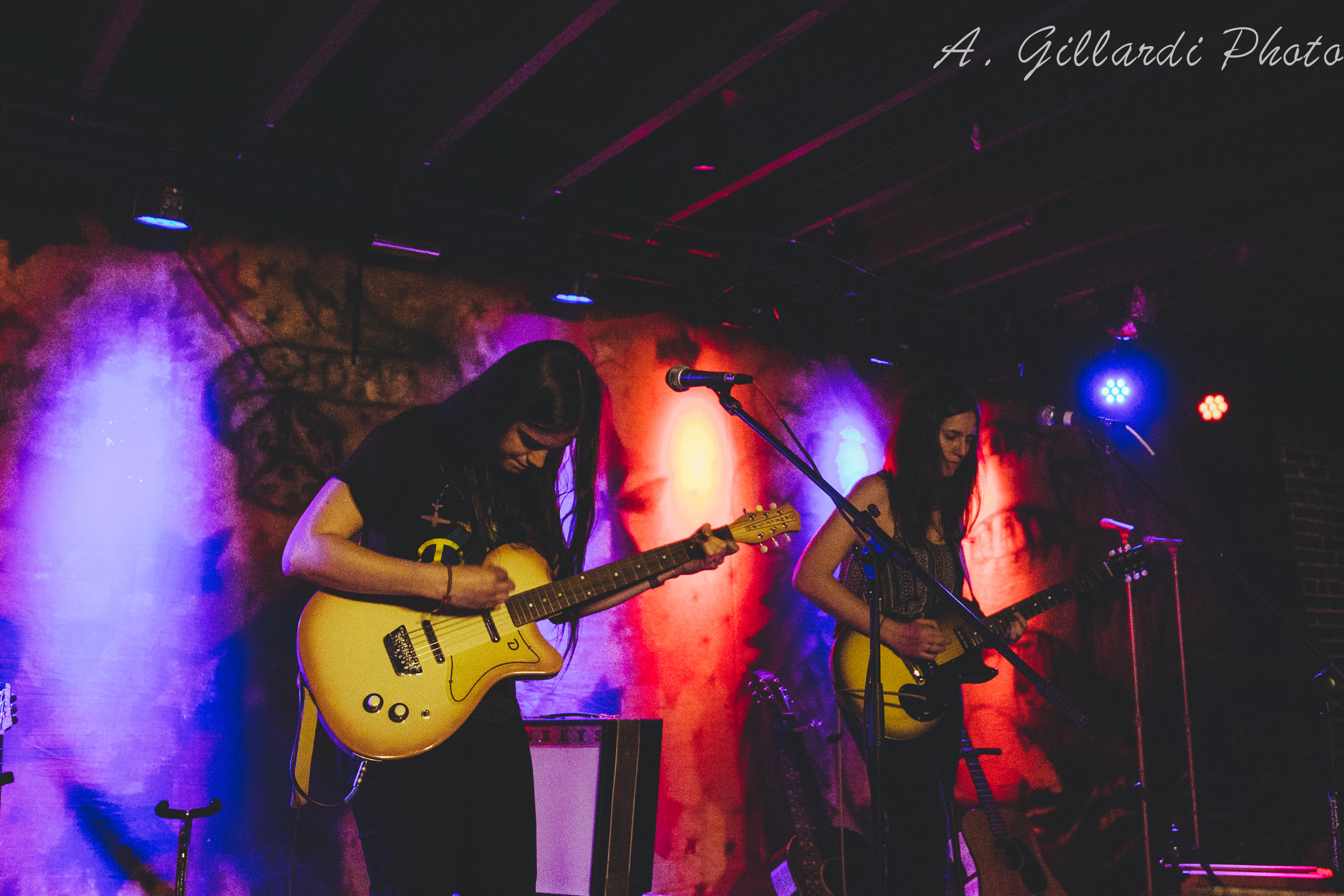

Background information
- Origin: Paris, France
- Genres: Folk pop, indie pop
- Years active: 2012–present
- Labels: Fat Possum Records
- Members: Paloma Gil; Louise Hayat-Camard
- Website: www.thedoveandthewolf.com

The Dove & The Wolf are an American folk pop duo from Paris, France, now based in Philadelphia, Pennsylvania.

== History ==
The duo began in 2012, releasing a self-titled EP. Two years later, the duo moved to Philadelphia and released a second EP titled The Words You Said. In 2017, The Dove & The Wolf signed to Fat Possum Records and released their third EP titled I Don't Know What To Feel. The duo released their first full-length album, Conversations, in 2019.

== Band members ==
- Paloma Gil
- Louise Hayat-Camard

== Discography ==
Studio albums

- Conversations (2019)

EPs

- EP (2012)
- The Words You Said (2014)
- I Don't Know What To Feel (2017)
