= A Deeper Understanding =

2017 studio album by the War on Drugs

Studio album by The War on Drugs
- Released: August 25, 2017
- Genres: Heartland rock; synth-pop; Americana; psychedelic rock
- Length: 66:13
- Label: Atlantic
- Producer: Adam Granduciel

The War on Drugs chronology
Lost in the Dream (2014)	A Deeper Understanding (2017)	I Don't Live Here Anymore (2021)

Singles from A Deeper Understanding
- 1. "Thinking of a Place" Released: April 22, 2017; 2. "Holding On" Released: June 1, 2017; 3. "Strangest Thing" Released: July 18, 2017; 4. "Pain" Released: August 3, 2017; 5. "Up All Night" Released: August 15, 2017

A Deeper Understanding is the fourth studio album by American indie rock band The War on Drugs. It was released on August 25, 2017, through Atlantic Records. The album was mixed by engineer Shawn Everett. The album won Best Rock Album at the 60th Annual Grammy Awards.

== Reception ==
Professional ratings
Aggregate scores
Source	Rating
AnyDecentMusic?	7.6/10
Metacritic	81/100
Review scores
Source	Rating
AllMusic	4/5 stars
The A.V. Club	A−
The Guardian	4/5 stars
The Independent	3/5 stars
NME	4/5 stars
The Observer	4/5 stars
Pitchfork	8.7/10
Q	4/5 stars
Rolling Stone	4/5 stars
Uncut	8/10

A Deeper Understanding received acclaim from music critics. At Metacritic, which assigns a normalized rating out of 100 to reviews from mainstream critics, the album received an average score of 81, based on 33 reviews, indicating universal acclaim. According to Marcy Donelson of AllMusic, A Deeper Understanding "reclaims and explores the distinctive soundscapes, vastness, and haunted psyche of Lost in the Dream, and that in itself is significant." On the same site, in a readers' poll by users it was ranked as the #1 album of 2017. Mark Richardson of Pitchfork noted similarities with mid-'80s rock, stating it is "also a fascinating study in influence; it’s hard to think of a band with more obvious touchstones that also sounds so original." Michael Bonner of Uncut Magazine described it as "some of the richest, most compelling and least lonely-sounding music of Granduciel’s career".

In a less enthusiastic review for Slant Magazine, Josh Goller noted "the album's lyrics, however, can’t match this same level of musical precision, and Granduciel too often repeats the same vague sentiments using threadbare imagery." The album's title was influenced by Kate Bush's song with the same name.

It was nominated for International Album of the Year at the 2018 UK Americana Awards.

At the 60th Annual Grammy Awards, A Deeper Understanding won the Grammy Award for Best Rock Album.

=== Accolades ===
Publication	Accolade	Rank	Ref.
Drowned in Sound	Favourite Albums of 2017	96	
Exclaim!	Top 20 Pop & Rock Albums of 2017	9	
The Independent	The 30 Best Albums of 2017	29	
NME	NME's Albums of the Year 2017	39	
Pitchfork	The 50 Best Albums of 2017	11	
RIOT Mag	RIOT's Albums Of The Year 2017	9	
Stereogum	The 50 Best Albums of 2017	6	
Uncut	75 Best Albums of 2017	2	
Vinyl Me, Please	The 30 Best Albums of 2017	12	

== Track listing ==
All words by Adam Granduciel. All music by Granduciel, except where noted.

No.	Title	Music	Length
1.	"Up All Night"		6:23
2.	"Pain"		5:30
3.	"Holding On"	Granduciel; Robbie Bennett	5:50
4.	"Strangest Thing"		6:40
5.	"Knocked Down"		4:00
6.	"Nothing to Find"		6:10
7.	"Thinking of a Place"		11:10
8.	"In Chains"		7:20
9.	"Clean Living"		6:28
10.	"You Don't Have to Go"		6:42
Total length:			66:13

== Personnel ==
The War on Drugs

- Robbie Bennett – Prophet 12 (tracks 1, 7), piano (2–4, 8, 10), celeste (3, 9), backing vocals (4), Hammond Organ (9), Rhodes (9), Baldwin Organ (10)
- Adam Granduciel – vocals (all tracks), LinnDrum (1), samplers (1), Yamaha CS-5 (1), piano (1, 2, 4, 5, 7–9), electric guitars (1, 3, 5, 8–10), Wurlitzer (1, 4, 5, 7, 10), Mellotron (1, 5), Hammond Organ (1, 6), E70 Organ (2), Nashville guitars (2), acoustic guitars (2–4, 6–10), lead electric guitars (2, 4, 6, 7), vibes (2, 5, 7), celeste (2, 7), Juno 106 (2, 7), synthesizers (3, 6), bass guitar (4), Korg Trident (4), harmonica (4, 6–10), percussion (4, 8), Arp Solina (4, 8, 9), Prophet 5 (4, 9, 10), PolyKorg (5), drums (6, 8), Vox Jaguar (7), Roland Juno-60 (7–9), organ (8), tape loops (8), Vox Organ (9)
- Charlie Hall – drums (1, 2, 7, 8), percussion (1, 2, 7, 10), backing vocals (4), electric guitar (4), vibes (8)
- Dave Hartley – bass guitar (1–4, 6, 8), glockenspiel (3), acoustic guitar (4), backing vocals (4), fretless bass (5, 7, 10), Höfner bass (9)
- Anthony LaMarca – electric guitar (2, 4, 8, 9), slide guitar (3), backing vocals (4), drums (5), acoustic guitar (7)
- Jon Natchez – baritone saxophone (1, 2, 8–10)

Additional musicians

- Patrick Berkery – drums (3, 9), percussion (3, 8, 9)
- Michael Bloch – electric rhythm guitar (3, 7), electric guitar (6, 9)
- Meg Duffy – slide guitar (3, 9)
- Max Hart – Prophet 6 (3), Oberheim Expander (3), pedal steel (7)
- Otto Hauser – drums, percussion (10)
- Darren Jessee – drums, percussion (4)
- Michael Johnson – Arp Odyssey (1, 10)
- Josh Kauffman – amplified voice (8), electric guitar (8, 10)
- Parker Kindred – percussion (9)
- Sterling Laws – drums, percussion (6)
- Lucius (Jess Wolfe and Holly Laessig) – backing vocals (2)
- Carter Tanton – acoustic guitar (5)
- The Dove & The Wolf (Louise Hayat & Paloma Gil) – backing vocals (7, 10)

Technical

- Adam Granduciel – production, recording
- Shawn Everett – recording, mixing
- Nick Krill, Daniel Schlett, Nicolas Vernhes, Gabe Cox Wax and Jeff Zeigler – additional recording
- Greg Calbi – mastering at Sterling Sound Studios

Artwork and design

- Adam Granduciel – art direction
- Rob Carmichael – art direction, design
- Shawn Brackbill – center booklet photograph
- Dusdin Condren – photography

== Charts ==
=== Weekly charts ===
Chart (2017)	Peak position
Australian Albums (ARIA)	5
Austrian Albums (Ö3 Austria)	13
Belgian Albums (Ultratop Flanders)	1
Belgian Albums (Ultratop Wallonia)	9
Canadian Albums (Billboard)	8
Czech Albums (ČNS IFPI)	36
Danish Albums (Hitlisten)	10
Dutch Albums (Album Top 100)	2
Finnish Albums (Suomen virallinen lista)	9
French Albums (SNEP)	50
German Albums (Offizielle Top 100)	12
Irish Albums (IRMA)	4
Italian Albums (FIMI)	85
New Zealand Albums (RMNZ)	6
Norwegian Albums (VG-lista)	6
Portuguese Albums (AFP)	5
Scottish Albums (Official Charts)	2
Spanish Albums (PROMUSICAE)	9
Swedish Albums (Sverigetopplistan)	6
Swiss Albums (Schweizer Hitparade)	11
UK Albums (Official Charts)	3
US Billboard 200	10
US Top Alternative Albums (Billboard)	2
US Top Rock Albums (Billboard)	2

=== Year-end charts ===
Chart (2017)	Position
Belgian Albums (Ultratop Flanders)	10
Dutch Albums (MegaCharts)	50
US Top Rock Albums (Billboard)	76

Chart (2018)	Position
Belgian Albums (Ultratop Flanders)	22

Chart (2019)	Position
Belgian Albums (Ultratop Flanders)	102

Chart (2020)	Position
Belgian Albums (Ultratop Flanders)	182

== Certifications ==
Region	Certification	Certified units/sales
Belgium (BRMA)	Gold	10,000^{‡}
Netherlands (NVPI)	Gold	20,000^{‡}
United Kingdom (BPI)	Silver	60,000^{‡}
^{‡} Sales+streaming figures based on certification alone.
