= Wagonwheel Blues =

2008 studio album by the War on Drugs

Studio album by the War on Drugs
- Released: June 19, 2008
- Genre: Indie rock; rock; Americana
- Length: 43:03
- Label: Secretly Canadian
- Producer: Adam Granduciel; Kurt Vile; Jeff Zeigler

The War on Drugs chronology
Barrel of Batteries (2008)	Wagonwheel Blues (2008)	Future Weather (2010)

Singles from Wagonwheel Blues
- 1. "Taking the Farm" Released: September 29, 2008

Wagonwheel Blues is the debut album by American indie rock band the War on Drugs, released on June 19, 2008, on Secretly Canadian. Primarily a collaboration between founding members Adam Granduciel and Kurt Vile, it is the only studio album to feature contributions from drummer Kyle Lloyd.

== Background and recording ==
Upon the album's release, vocalist and guitarist Adam Granduciel noted that the album's songs "each have their own little time frame spanning over the last six-to-seven years." Granduciel elaborated, "There are sounds on these songs from over eight years of home recording; bits and pieces here and there, dumped from cassettes, MiniDiscs, samplers, rough mixes run through amps and sampled, but most importantly all the performances are fresh and invigorating."

== Critical reception ==
Professional ratings
Review scores
Source	Rating
AllMusic	3.5/5 stars
Drowned in Sound	8/10
The Fly	4/5 stars
The Line of Best Fit	8/10
Pitchfork	7.8/10
Tiny Mix Tapes	3.5/5 stars

The album received generally positive reviews.

== Track listing ==
All tracks are written by Adam Granduciel, except where noted.

No.	Title	Music	Length
1.	"Arms Like Boulders"		5:20
2.	"Taking the Farm"	Granduciel, Vile	4:00
3.	"Coast Reprise"	Granduciel, Vile	3:15
4.	"Buenos Aires Beach"		3:23
5.	"There Is No Urgency"		6:19
6.	"A Needle in Your Eye #16"		4:54
7.	"Reverse the Charges"		3:20
8.	"Show Me the Coast"	Granduciel, Vile	10:03
9.	"Barrel of Batteries"		2:29
Total length:			43:03

== Personnel ==
Per the album liner notes:

=== The War on Drugs ===
- Adam Granduciel – vocals, electric and acoustic guitars, harmonica, drums, organs, samplers, Rhodes, MS16, piano
- Kurt Vile – electric and acoustic 12-string guitars, lead Jazzmaster, vocals, OB-8, Wurlitzer, trumpet, piano
- David Hartley – electric bass (1, 2)
- Kyle Lloyd – drums and percussion (1, 5)

=== Additional musicians ===
- Paul Cobb – left and right drums (2)
- Ryan Cobb – sweep guitar (2)

=== Recording personnel ===
- Adam Granduciel – producer; recording and mixing (3, 4, 7, 9)
- Kurt Vile – producer
- Jeff Zeigler – producer; recording and mixing (6, 8)
- Ryan Cobb – recording (1, 2, 5); mixing (1)
- Paul Cobb – recording (1, 2, 5); mixing (1)
- Brian McTear – mixing (2, 5)
- Michael Johnson – additional engineering
- Kyle Lloyd – additional engineering
- John Martin – amplifier preparation

=== Artwork ===
- Adam Granduciel – SX-70 photos
- Daniel Murphy – art direction, layout
