= Lost in the Dream =

2014 studio album by the War on Drugs

Studio album by The War on Drugs
- Released: March 18, 2014
- Recorded: August 2012–November 2013
- Studios: Uniform Recording, Philadelphia; Echo Mountain, Asheville; Fidelitorium, Kernersville; Rare Book Room, Brooklyn; Miner Street, Philadelphia; Water Music, Hoboken; Public Hi-Fi, Austin; University of the Arts, Philadelphia; Adam Granduciel's house, Philadelphia
- Genres: Indie rock; Americana; psychedelic rock; heartland rock
- Length: 60:31
- Label: Secretly Canadian
- Producer: Adam Granduciel

The War on Drugs chronology
Slave Ambient (2011)	Lost in the Dream (2014)	A Deeper Understanding (2017)

Singles from Lost in the Dream
- 1. "Red Eyes" Released: December 4, 2013; 2. "Under the Pressure" Released: May 26, 2014; 3. "Burning" Released: August 11, 2014; 4. "Eyes to the Wind" Released: December 8, 2014; 5. "An Ocean in Between the Waves" Released: March 9, 2015

Lost in the Dream is the third studio album by American indie rock band The War on Drugs, released on March 18, 2014, through Secretly Canadian. The recording session, which took place over a two-year period, was characterized by numerous rewrites. The album's lyrical themes were influenced by the loneliness and depression Granduciel faced after he finished touring. Musically, the record was inspired by 1980s rock, as well as Americana, with influences coming from Bruce Springsteen, Spacemen 3 and Neil Young & Crazy Horse.

The album debuted at number 26 on the Billboard 200 and received universal acclaim from critics upon its release, appearing on and topping numerous end-of-year lists of the best albums. Five promotional radio singles were released: "Red Eyes", "Under the Pressure", "Burning", "Eyes to the Wind", and "An Ocean in Between the Waves".

== Background ==
After The War on Drugs' second album Slave Ambient was released to much critical acclaim, primary songwriter Adam Granduciel spent much of 2011 touring. After the tour was finished, Granduciel had a hard time adjusting to everyday life, later recounting that such feelings "started to spiral into emotional distress and physical manifestations of depression and paranoia." This depression and paranoia served as an inspiration to the lyrical theme of Lost in the Dream.

== Production ==
=== Recording ===
Recording on the album began in the summer of 2012 and took place over a two-year period in Philadelphia, New York City, North Carolina, and New Jersey. Granduciel wrote all the songs on the album. The album's recording was characterized by Granduciel's anxiety and second-guessing, with Granduciel remarking "I started going off the rails a little bit in my own head, getting a little too sucked in."

Songs on the album went through several versions. Granduciel scrapped the original demo for "An Ocean in Between the Waves" two weeks before the album was supposed to be turned in to the record company after spending a year writing the song, saying that "it wasn't the vibe of the song that I was searching for." "Suffering" went through several variations before Granduciel decided to go back to the original demo.

=== Music ===
The music on Lost in the Dream is inspired by 1980s rock, as well as Americana and Krautrock. Artists who have been cited as influences on the album's overall sound include Bruce Springsteen, Tom Petty, Bob Dylan, the Waterboys, Spacemen 3, Spiritualized, Talk Talk and Orchestral Manoeuvres in the Dark. The album's sound is characterized by synthesizers, keyboards, horns and "ambient guitars". Whereas the previous albums by The War on Drugs contained several instrumental tracks, Lost in the Dream only has one instrumental track, "The Haunting Idle".

Critics have compared the song "Burning" to Springsteen's "Dancing in the Dark" and Rod Stewart's "Young Turks". Fleetwood Mac's influence was noted on "An Ocean in Between the Waves", while Pitchfork compared "Disappearing" to Tears for Fears' "Pale Shelter".

"Under the Pressure" is based on Adam Granduciel and how he split with his girlfriend and was feeling alone and depressed after being back in the city.

== Artwork ==
The album cover features an image of Adam Granduciel standing in front of a window in his home. Granduciel commented on how the album's artwork was a reflection of his involvement in the recording process, saying "This wasn't a band record. This was a solo record. I knew that. They've all [The War on Drugs' albums] been solo records."

== Release ==
The album was announced on December 4, 2013. That same day, the first single from the album, "Red Eyes" was released. The band debuted the tracks "Under the Pressure", "Eyes to the Wind", and "Burning" during the band's December 2013 tour of Australia. On March 5, 2014, a music video for "Red Eyes" was released. The album was streamed in its entirety on March 10, 2014, on The Guardian's website. On August 20, 2014, a music video for "Under the Pressure" was released.

As of August 2017 the album has sold more than 255,000 copies (including streaming equivalents), according to Nielsen; some 114,000 of those sales were physical.

== Critical reception ==
Professional ratings
Aggregate scores
Source	Rating
AnyDecentMusic?	8.4/10
Metacritic	86/100
Review scores
Source	Rating
AllMusic	5/5 stars
The A.V. Club	A−
The Guardian	4/5 stars
The Independent	4/5 stars
The Irish Times	5/5 stars
NME	9/10
Pitchfork	8.8/10
Q	4/5 stars
Rolling Stone	3/5 stars
Spin	9/10

Lost in the Dream received acclaim from contemporary music critics. On Metacritic, it holds a score of 86 out of 100 based on 40 reviews, indicating "universal acclaim". Pitchfork's Stuart Berman gave Lost in the Dream a "Best New Music" designation and remarked that the album is "loaded with songs whose greatness is revealed slowly, where the simplest, most understated chord change can blow a track wide open and elevate it from simply pretty to absolutely devastating." AllMusic's Fred Thomas called Lost in the Dream "the War on Drugs' Daydream Nation or Disintegration" and wrote of the album: "It's a near flawless collection of dreamy vibes, shifting moods, and movement, and stands easily as Granduciel's finest hour so far." Dan Caffrey of Consequence of Sound felt that over repeated plays of the album, one gradually realizes "that Granduciel is discovering the problems of his life, not figuring them out or even reflecting on them. This all makes for an album that truly sounds like it's coming to life." Ross Horton of musicOMH called Lost in the Dream "a tender, inviting, consoling, comforting record that you'll play again and again (stoned or not)" and "perfect in every way".

While stating that Lost in the Dream fails to consistently live up to its peak moments, Greg Kot of the Chicago Tribune nonetheless concluded that Granduciel "is on to something with this more band-focused release, and that new dynamic deserves an even deeper exploration next time." In a mixed assessment, Mike Powell of Rolling Stone felt that "seven-minutes-plus songs like 'In Reverse' and 'An Ocean in Between the Waves' have enough locomotion to go twice as long, while slower tracks like 'Suffering' are deadwood in search of a spark." In an otherwise positive review, Mike Walmsley of The 405 criticized the second half of the album, writing "Unfortunately, as they pass the Midwest on their road trip, the Mustang appears to have run out of gas." In 2019, Happy Mag placed Lost In The Dream at no.7 on their list of "The 25 best psychedelic rock albums of the 2010s", stating that it is "a shining example of starting a record with guns blazing." For the album's tenth anniversary in 2024, Dash Lewis – who had toured with the band White Laces as the opening act for The War on Drugs in 2014 – wrote for Paste that, "A decade after release, the album still feels singular in the War on Drug's discography... Since Lost in the Dream they've become a kind of institution, the Last Great American Rock Band."

=== Accolades ===
Based on 139 year-end top ten lists compiled by Metacritic, Lost in the Dream was the most critically acclaimed album of 2014, appearing on 54 lists and being named first on 13 of them. Paste named Lost in the Dream as their album of the year, writing "from all the muck and malaise that midlife produces, something beautiful and permanent has been revealed—an enduring contribution to the canon." Consequence named it their album of the year, writing "In tune with Granduciel’s way of evoking synchronicity, there’s a cosmic truth to Lost in the Dream triumphing this year. For one, Granduciel is personally seizing the crown off the head of his musical soulmate, Kurt Vile ... and, for Secretly Canadian ... it’s a poignant landmark following the year it lost its godfather, Jason Molina." Other publications that named Lost in the Dream as album of the year included Uncut, Q and Under the Radar. The album was ranked #2 on Mojo's, American Songwriter's, musicOMH's, Stereogum's and The Guardian's best albums of the year list for 2014. The album was ranked the 103rd greatest indie rock album of all time by Melophobe in 2023.

== Track listing ==
All tracks are written by Adam Granduciel, except "Disappearing" by Granduciel and Michael Johnson.

No.	Title	Length
1.	"Under the Pressure"	8:52
2.	"Red Eyes"	4:58
3.	"Suffering"	6:02
4.	"An Ocean in Between the Waves"	7:10
5.	"Disappearing"	6:50
6.	"Eyes to the Wind"	5:55
7.	"The Haunting Idle"	3:08
8.	"Burning"	5:46
9.	"Lost in the Dream"	4:10
10.	"In Reverse"	7:40
Total length:		60:31

== Personnel ==
The following people contributed to Lost in the Dream:

=== Musicians ===
The War on Drugs

- Adam Granduciel – vocals (1–6, 8–10), electric guitar (1–4, 6–10), piano (1, 3, 5, 9–10), synthesizer (1, 3–5, 8–10), MS16 Dubs (1), acoustic guitar (2, 4, 6, 8–10), Mitch Easter's Hagstrom 12 strings (2), ARP string synthesizer (2), Black Box guitar (3), Wurlitzer (3), Fender Rhodes (3), Flux guitars (4), organ (4, 8), electric Firebird guitars (5), slide guitar (5), Space Wurlitzer (5), drums (5, 8), Linn Drum (5), harmonica (5–6, 8–9), Space Rhodes (6), ARP Omni II (6), Oberheim (7), percussion (8–10), Fun Machine (9), Publison (10)
- Dave Hartley – bass (1, 3–4, 6, 8–10), fretless bass (2), percussion (2), Mutron II Bass (5)
- Charlie Hall – drums (1, 6, 10), percussion (1, 10)
- Jon Natchez – baritone saxophone (1–2, 6)
- Robbie Bennett – upright piano (2, 6), organ (2), Mutron Rhodes (4), Flux Wurlitzer (5), grand piano (6), ARP String Synthesizer (6), piano (8, 10), Wurlitzer (9)

Additional musicians

- Michael Johnson – ARP 2600 (1, 5), Eventide Cascades (7)
- Pat Berkery – drums (2–3)
- Ricky Ray Jackson – pedal steel guitar (3, 6)
- Joseph Shabason – saxophone (3, 6)
- Nicolas Vernhes – organ (3), tambourine (10)
- Jon Ashley – drums (tracks 4, 9)
- David Fishkin – saxophone (4)
- Jeff Ziegler – pitch transposer (5), additional drum programming (5)
- Mike Sobel – lap steel guitar (6)
- Paul Sukeena – black Strat (7)
- Mike Sneeringer – inadvertent drums (8)
- Gabe Wax – tape flangin' (8)
- Carter Tanton – Leslie guitar (9)

=== Production personnel ===
Per the album liner notes:

- Adam Granduciel – producer, arranger, additional engineering, mixing, art direction, photography
- Jeff Zeigler – additional production, most engineering, pre-mixing, mixing (4, 5, 7)
- Nicolas Vernhes – mixing, additional engineering
- Gabe Wax – assistant mix engineer
- Jon Low – additional engineering
- Brad Bell – additional engineering
- Michael Johnson – additional engineering
- Jon Ashley – assistant engineer
- Sean Kelly – assistant engineer
- Ted Richardson – assistant engineer
- Matt Schimelfenig – assistant engineer
- Greg Calbi – mastering
- Steve Fallone – additional mastering engineer
- Dustin Condren – cover photo, photography
- Daniel Murphy – design, layout

== Charts ==
=== Weekly charts ===
Chart (2014)	Peak position
Australian Albums (ARIA)	28
Belgian Albums (Ultratop Flanders)	3
Belgian Albums (Ultratop Wallonia)	69
Finnish Albums (Suomen virallinen lista)	37
Danish Albums (Hitlisten)	19
Dutch Albums (Album Top 100)	18
Norwegian Albums (VG-lista)	9
Swedish Albums (Sverigetopplistan)	26
Swiss Albums (Schweizer Hitparade)	66
UK Albums (Official Charts)	18
UK Independent Albums (Official Charts)	4
US Billboard 200	26
US Top Alternative Albums (Billboard)	6
US Top Rock Albums (Billboard)	7

=== Year-end charts ===
Chart (2014)	Position
Belgian Albums (Ultratop Flanders)	18
Dutch Albums (Album Top 100)	80

Chart (2015)	Position
Dutch Albums (Album Top 100)	58

Chart (2019)	Position
Belgian Albums (Ultratop Flanders)	168

== Certifications ==
Region	Certification	Certified units/sales
New Zealand (RMNZ)	Gold	7,500^{‡}
United Kingdom (BPI)	Gold	100,000^{‡}
^{‡} Sales+streaming figures based on certification alone.
